= Terry Stotts =

American basketball coach (born 1957)

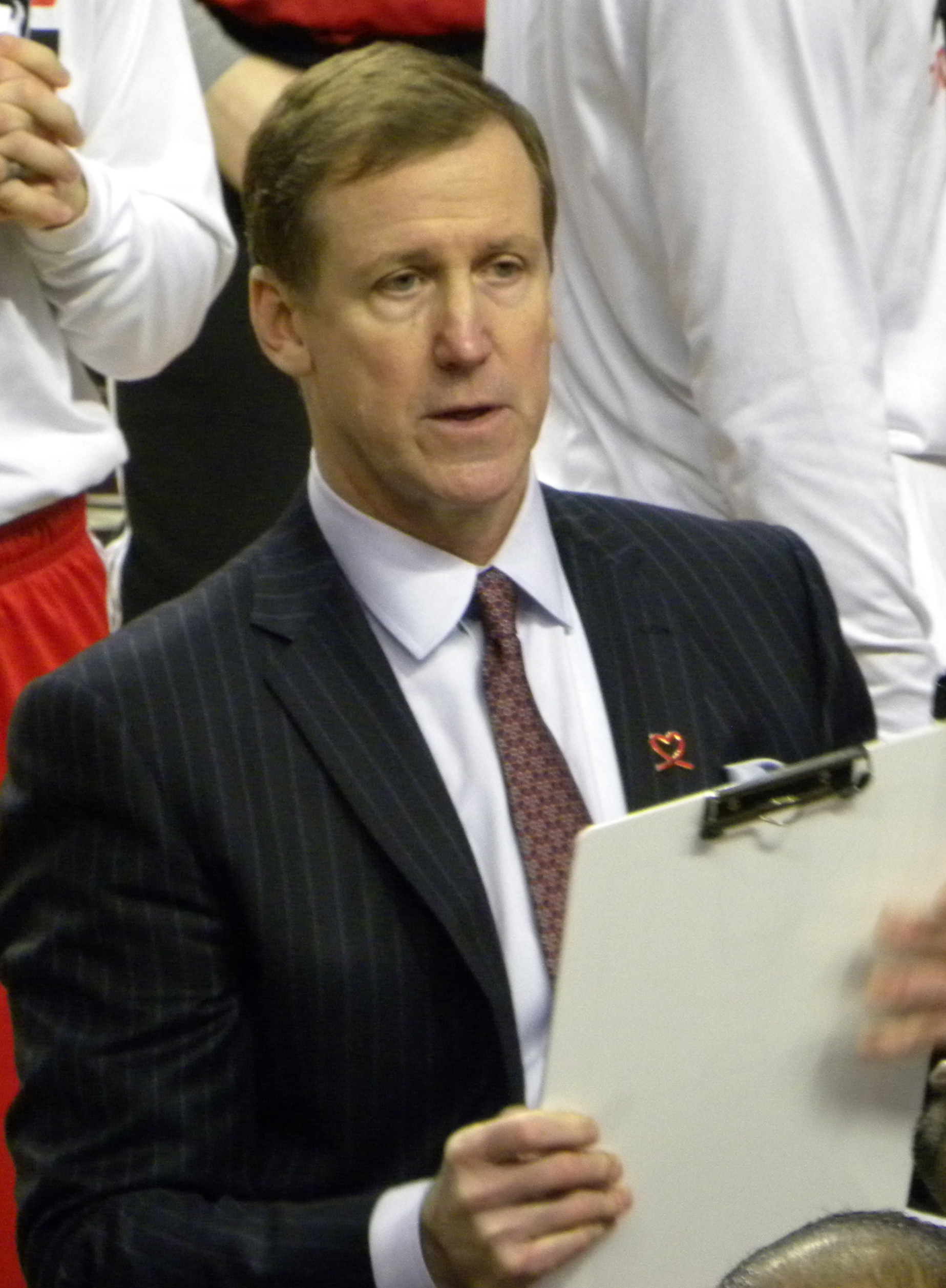
- Stotts in 2015

Personal information
- Born: November 25, 1957 (age 68) Cedar Falls, Iowa, U.S.
- Listed height: 6 ft 8 in (2.03 m)
- Listed weight: 220 lb (100 kg)

Career information
- High school: Bloomington North (Bloomington, Indiana)
- College: Oklahoma (1976–1980)
- NBA draft: 1980: 2nd round, 38th overall pick
- Drafted by: Houston Rockets
- Playing career: 1980–1989
- Position: Forward
- Coaching career: 1990–present

Career history

Playing
- 1980: Squibb Cantù
- 1980–1983: Montana Golden Nuggets
- 1983–1984: CB Estudiantes
- 1985–1987: Étoile de Voiron
- 1988–1989: Chorale Roanne
- 1989–1990: Sceaux Basket

Career highlights
- As player: CBA All-Defensive First Team (1983); All-Big Eight (1980); 2× Academic All-American (1979, 1980); As assistant coach: NBA champion (2011)
- Stats at Basketball Reference

Terry Linn Stotts (born November 25, 1957) is an American professional basketball coach and former player. He previously served as head coach of the Portland Trail Blazers of the NBA from 2012 to 2021 and as an assistant coach for the Milwaukee Bucks and Golden State Warriors.

After playing as a forward in Europe and the Continental Basketball Association (CBA), where he was coached by George Karl, Stotts became a part of Karl's coaching staff on multiple teams in the CBA and NBA. He later worked as a head coach for the Atlanta Hawks and Milwaukee Bucks, before helping the Dallas Mavericks win the 2011 NBA championship as an assistant coach.

== Early life and college career ==
Born in Cedar Falls, Iowa, Stotts grew up in Illinois, Wisconsin, Guam, and Indiana and graduated from Bloomington High School North in Bloomington, Indiana in 1976. Stotts was a member of the 1976 Indiana All-Star Team.

Stotts was a starter in all his four seasons with the University of Oklahoma Sooners basketball team and was an Academic All-American selection in his junior and senior seasons and an All-Big Eight Conference selection in his senior season. He graduated from Oklahoma in 1980 with a B.S. in zoology and a Master in Business Administration from Oklahoma in 1988 on a postgraduate scholarship from the NCAA.

== Playing career ==
After averaging 16.9 points per game as a senior at Oklahoma, Stotts was a second-round selection of the Houston Rockets in the 1980 NBA draft, but he could not find a place on the team. He began his professional playing career in Italy before joining George Karl's Continental Basketball Association (CBA) team, the Montana Golden Nuggets, in the early 1980s. He played for the team for three seasons. Stotts was selected to the CBA All-Defensive First Team in 1983. He then returned to Europe for several seasons, playing in Spain (CB Estudiantes) and France.

== Coaching career ==
=== Early career with George Karl and the CBA ===
After retiring as a player, Stotts joined Karl's coaching staff as an assistant with the CBA's Albany Patroons in 1990–91. During his first year, he helped lead the Patroons to an all-time CBA-best 50–6 record. Stotts then coached the CBA's Fort Wayne Fury for one season before rejoining Karl as part of his staff on the Seattle SuperSonics in the NBA. He then moved with Karl to the Milwaukee Bucks in 1998.

=== Atlanta Hawks ===
In 2002, Stotts decided to part ways with Karl and joined the Atlanta Hawks as an assistant coach. He was promoted to head coach 27 games into the season after Lon Kruger was fired. Stotts led the Hawks to a 24–31 record before he was let go, and returned to the assistant coaching ranks with the Golden State Warriors.

=== Milwaukee Bucks ===
In 2005, Stotts became the head coach of the Milwaukee Bucks. He guided them to the playoffs in his first season, but was fired towards the end of his second season on March 14, 2007.

=== Dallas Mavericks ===
Stotts was hired as an assistant coach for the Dallas Mavericks shortly after Rick Carlisle was hired as head coach in September 2008. He was credited for coordinating the Mavericks' offense that was one of the most efficient in the league in 2010–11, when they won the NBA title.

=== Portland Trail Blazers ===
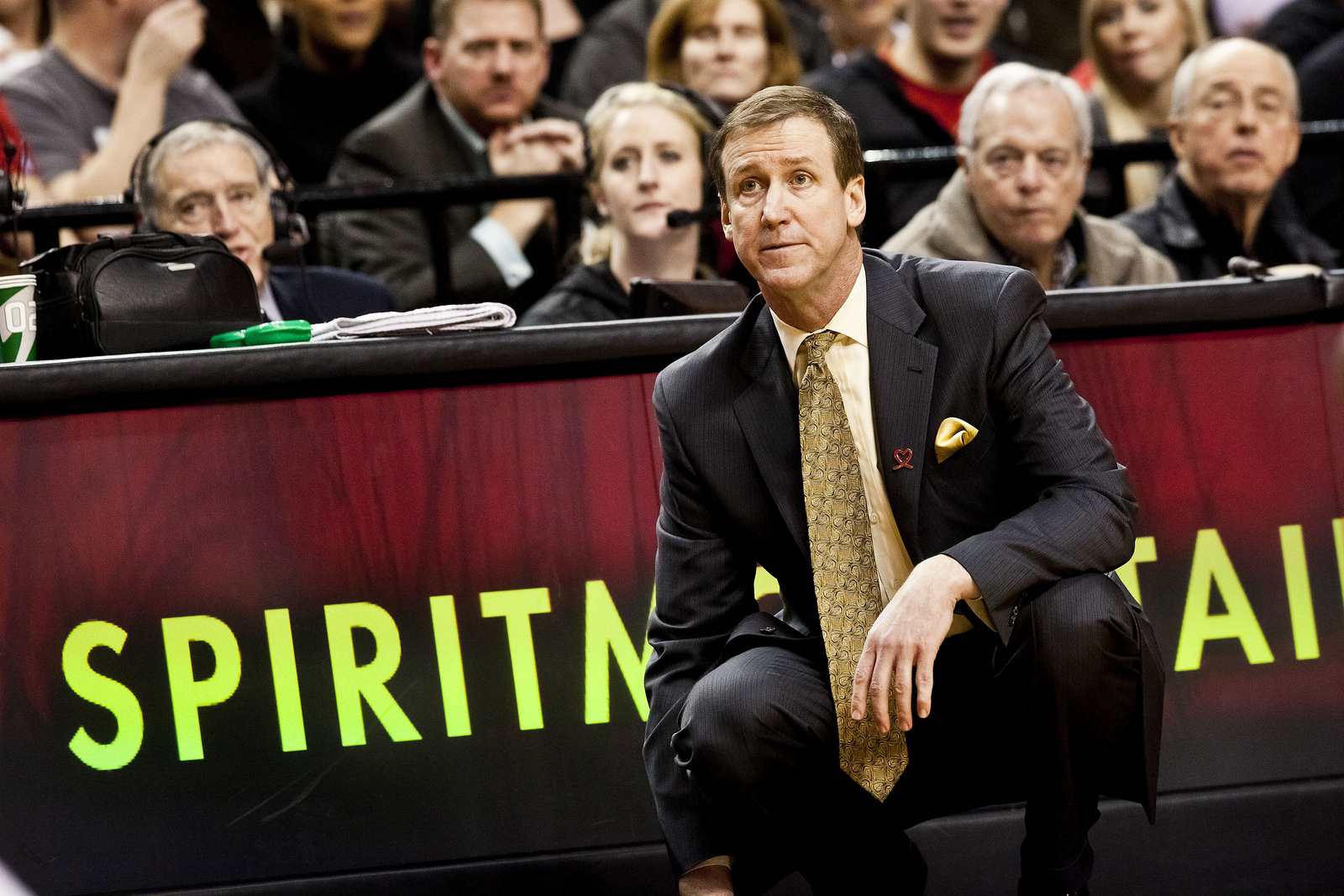
Terry Stotts in action as coach of the Portland Trail Blazers, 2015

The Portland Trail Blazers hired Stotts as their head coach on August 7, 2012. The Blazers went 33–49 in Stotts's first year, losing their final 13 games to drop out of the playoff race.

In Stotts's second season, he coached the team to an overall record of 54–28. They beat the Houston Rockets in the first round of the NBA playoffs with a buzzer-beating three-point shot by Damian Lillard to advance to the second round, but fell to the eventual NBA champion San Antonio Spurs in the second round, ultimately losing in five games.

In Stotts's third season, he led the team to an overall record of 51–31. After sustaining key injuries, they fell to the Memphis Grizzlies in the first round of the NBA playoffs, 4–1.

Despite losing four of his starters including star forward LaMarcus Aldridge, in the off-season, Stotts's fourth season saw him lead the Trail Blazers to the second round, after defeating the Los Angeles Clippers in the first. In the second round, Portland played the top-seeded Golden State Warriors to a competitive five-game series, but eventually lost 4–1. On May 16, 2016, Stotts agreed to a contract extension with the Trail Blazers.

In the 2018–19 season, Stotts led the Trail Blazers to a 53–29 regular-season record and their deepest playoff run in almost 20 years. Portland defeated the Oklahoma City Thunder 4–1 and Denver Nuggets 4–3 in the first two rounds, but got swept by the two-time defending NBA champion Golden State Warriors in the Conference finals.

On June 4, 2021, after falling to the Denver Nuggets in six games for their fourth first-round exit in five years, Stotts and the Blazers mutually agreed to part ways. He left the club with the second-most wins in franchise history with 402.

=== Golden State Warriors ===
On June 28, 2023, Stotts was hired by the Milwaukee Bucks as an assistant coach. On October 19, one day before the final game of the Bucks’ preseason, he resigned.

On September 27, 2024, Stotts was hired by the Golden State Warriors as an assistant coach alongside former NBA player Jerry Stackhouse. On May 14, 2026, it was reported that Stotts would be leaving the Warriors.

== Head coaching record ==
Legend
Regular season	G	Games coached	W	Games won	L	Games lost	W–L %	Win–loss %
Playoffs	PG	Playoff games	PW	Playoff wins	PL	Playoff losses	PW–L %	Playoff win–loss %

Team	Year	G	W	L	W–L%	Finish	PG	PW	PL	PW–L%	Result
Atlanta	2002–03	55	24	31	.436	5th in Central	—	—	—	—	Missed playoffs
Atlanta	2003–04	82	28	54	.341	7th in Central	—	—	—	—	Missed playoffs
Milwaukee	2005–06	82	40	42	.488	5th in Central	5	1	4	.200	Lost in First round
Milwaukee	2006–07	64	23	41	.359	(fired)	—	—	—	—	—
Portland	2012–13	82	33	49	.402	4th in Northwest	—	—	—	—	Missed playoffs
Portland	2013–14	82	54	28	.659	2nd in Northwest	11	5	6	.455	Lost in Conference semifinals
Portland	2014–15	82	51	31	.622	1st in Northwest	5	1	4	.200	Lost in First round
Portland	2015–16	82	44	38	.537	2nd in Northwest	11	5	6	.455	Lost in Conference semifinals
Portland	2016–17	82	41	41	.500	3rd in Northwest	4	0	4	.000	Lost in First round
Portland	2017–18	82	49	33	.598	1st in Northwest	4	0	4	.000	Lost in First round
Portland	2018–19	82	53	29	.646	2nd in Northwest	16	8	8	.500	Lost in Conference finals
Portland	2019–20	74	35	39	.473	4th in Northwest	5	1	4	.200	Lost in First round
Portland	2020–21	72	42	30	.583	3rd in Northwest	6	2	4	.333	Lost in First round
Career		1,003	517	486	.515		67	23	44	.343	

== Personal life ==
Stotts and his wife Jan lived in Lake Oswego, Oregon, while he was with the Blazers. Outside of coaching, he enjoys cycling, traveling and golf.
