= 2020–21 San Antonio Spurs season =

- Head coach: Gregg Popovich
- President: Gregg Popovich; Brent Barry (vice)
- General manager: Brian Wright
- Owners: Peter Holt
- Arena: AT&T Center

Results
- Record: 33–39 (.458)
- Place: Division: 3rd (Southwest); Conference: 10th (Western)
- Playoff finish: Did not qualify
- Stats at Basketball Reference

Local media
- Television: Bally Sports Southwest, KENS, KMYS
- Radio: 1200 WOAI

The 2020–21 San Antonio Spurs season was the 54th season of the franchise, its 45th in the National Basketball Association (NBA), and its 48th in the San Antonio area. After a one-year absence from postseason play, the Spurs finished as the number ten seed with a 33–39 record, qualifying for the Page–McIntyre system tournament to determine the final two teams that advance to the main playoff bracket in the elimination bracket. The Spurs were defeated in the elimination round by the Memphis Grizzlies 96–100, ending their season. It was the first time in franchise history that the Spurs failed to reach the playoffs in consecutive seasons.

== Draft ==
Round	Pick	Player	Position	Nationality	School/Club
1	11	Devin Vassell	SG	United States	Florida State
2	41	Tre Jones	PG	United States	Duke

== Roster ==
2020–21 San Antonio Spurs roster
Players

Pos.	No.	Player	Height	Weight	DOB	From
F	31	Keita Bates-Diop (TW)	6 ft 8 in (2.03 m)	229 lb (104 kg)	1996-01-23	Ohio State
G/F	10	DeMar DeRozan	6 ft 7 in (2.01 m)	220 lb (100 kg)	1989-08-07	USC
F/C	7	Gorgui Dieng	6 ft 10 in (2.08 m)	252 lb (114 kg)	1990-01-18	Louisville
F/C	14	Drew Eubanks	6 ft 10 in (2.08 m)	245 lb (111 kg)	1997-02-01	Oregon State
F	22	Rudy Gay	6 ft 9 in (2.06 m)	250 lb (113 kg)	1986-08-17	Connecticut
G/F	55	DaQuan Jeffries	6 ft 5 in (1.96 m)	230 lb (104 kg)	1997-08-30	Tulsa
G/F	3	Keldon Johnson	6 ft 6 in (1.98 m)	205 lb (93 kg)	1999-10-11	Kentucky
G	33	Tre Jones	6 ft 1 in (1.85 m)	185 lb (84 kg)	2000-01-08	Duke
F	41	Trey Lyles (injured)	6 ft 9 in (2.06 m)	234 lb (106 kg)	1995-11-05	Kentucky
G	8	Patty Mills	6 ft 1 in (1.85 m)	180 lb (82 kg)	1988-08-11	Saint Mary's
G	5	Dejounte Murray	6 ft 4 in (1.93 m)	180 lb (82 kg)	1996-09-19	Washington
C	25	Jakob Pöltl	7 ft 1 in (2.16 m)	245 lb (111 kg)	1995-10-15	Utah
F	19	Luka Šamanić (injured)	6 ft 11 in (2.11 m)	227 lb (103 kg)	2000-01-09	Croatia
G/F	24	Devin Vassell	6 ft 7 in (2.01 m)	200 lb (91 kg)	2000-08-23	Florida State
G	1	Lonnie Walker	6 ft 4 in (1.93 m)	204 lb (93 kg)	1998-12-14	Miami (FL)
G	15	Quinndary Weatherspoon (TW)	6 ft 3 in (1.91 m)	205 lb (93 kg)	1996-09-10	Mississippi State
G	4	Derrick White (injured)	6 ft 4 in (1.93 m)	190 lb (86 kg)	1994-07-02	Colorado

Coaches
Head coach
- Gregg Popovich
Assistant(s)
- Chip Engelland
- Becky Hammon
- Will Hardy
- Mitch Johnson
- Darius Songaila

Legend
- (DP) Unsigned draft pick
- (FA) Free agent
- (S) Suspended
- (GL) On assignment to G League affiliate
- (TW) Two-way affiliate player
- Injured

Roster
Updated: December 5, 2024

== Standings ==
=== Division ===
Southwest Division	W	L	PCT	GB	Home	Road	Div	GP
y – Dallas Mavericks	42	30	.583	–	21‍–‍15	21‍–‍15	7–5	72
x – Memphis Grizzlies	38	34	.528	4.0	18‍–‍18	20‍–‍16	6–6	72
pi – San Antonio Spurs	33	39	.458	9.0	14‍–‍22	19‍–‍17	6–6	72
New Orleans Pelicans	31	41	.431	11.0	18‍–‍18	13‍–‍23	6–6	72
Houston Rockets	17	55	.236	25.0	9‍–‍27	8‍–‍28	5–7	72

=== Conference ===
Western Conference
#	Team	W	L	PCT	GB	GP
1	z – Utah Jazz *	52	20	.722	–	72
2	y – Phoenix Suns *	51	21	.708	1.0	72
3	x – Denver Nuggets	47	25	.653	5.0	72
4	x – Los Angeles Clippers	47	25	.653	5.0	72
5	y – Dallas Mavericks *	42	30	.583	10.0	72
6	x – Portland Trail Blazers	42	30	.583	10.0	72
7	x – Los Angeles Lakers	42	30	.583	10.0	72
8	pi – Golden State Warriors	39	33	.542	13.0	72
9	x – Memphis Grizzlies	38	34	.528	14.0	72
10	pi – San Antonio Spurs	33	39	.458	19.0	72
11	New Orleans Pelicans	31	41	.431	21.0	72
12	Sacramento Kings	31	41	.431	21.0	72
13	Minnesota Timberwolves	23	49	.319	29.0	72
14	Oklahoma City Thunder	22	50	.306	30.0	72
15	Houston Rockets	17	55	.236	35.0	72

== Game log ==
=== Preseason ===
2020 preseason game log
Total: 0–3 (Home: 0–1; Road: 0–2)
Preseason: 0–3 (home: 0–1; road: 0–2)

Game	Date	Team	Score	High points	High rebounds	High assists	Location Attendance	Record
1	December 12	Oklahoma City	L 108–121	Patty Mills (24)	Jakob Pöltl (9)	Jakob Pöltl (10)	AT&T Center	0–1
2	December 15	@ Houston	L 98–112	Lonnie Walker (17)	Trey Lyles (9)	Dejounte Murray (7)	Toyota Center	0–2
3	December 17	@ Houston	L 106–128	DeMar DeRozan (21)	Dejounte Murray (10)	Dejounte Murray (4)	Toyota Center	0–3

2020–21 season schedule

=== Regular season ===
2020–21 game log
Total: 33–39 (Home: 14–22; Road: 19–17)
December: 2–2 (home: 1–1; road: 1–1)

Game	Date	Team	Score	High points	High rebounds	High assists	Location Attendance	Record
1	December 23	@ Memphis	W 131–119	DeMar DeRozan (28)	DeMar DeRozan (9)	DeRozan, Murray (9)	FedExForum; 0	1–0
2	December 26	Toronto	W 119–114	DeMar DeRozan (27)	Dejounte Murray (10)	Dejounte Murray (10)	AT&T Center; 0	2–0
3	December 27	@ New Orleans	L 95–98	Rudy Gay (22)	Keldon Johnson (11)	DeMar DeRozan (9)	Smoothie King Center; 0	2–1
4	December 30	L. A. Lakers	L 107–121	Dejounte Murray (29)	Murray, Pöltl (7)	Dejounte Murray (7)	AT&T Center; 0	2–2

January: 9–7 (home: 4–5; road: 5–2)

Game	Date	Team	Score	High points	High rebounds	High assists	Location Attendance	Record
5	January 1	L. A. Lakers	L 103–109	Keldon Johnson (26)	Keldon Johnson (10)	DeMar DeRozan (9)	AT&T Center; 0	2–3
6	January 3	Utah	L 109–130	Keldon Johnson (22)	Trey Lyles (9)	Dejounte Murray (5)	AT&T Center; 0	2–4
7	January 5	@ L. A. Clippers	W 116–113	Patty Mills (27)	Keldon Johnson (11)	DeMar DeRozan (6)	Staples Center; 0	3–4
8	January 7	@ L. A. Lakers	W 118–109	LaMarcus Aldridge (28)	Dejounte Murray (8)	DeMar DeRozan (8)	Staples Center; 0	4–4
9	January 9	@ Minnesota	W 125–122 (OT)	DeMar DeRozan (38)	Dejounte Murray (14)	DeMar DeRozan (5)	Target Center; 0	5–4
10	January 10	@ Minnesota	L 88–96	Lonnie Walker IV (25)	Trey Lyles (7)	Dejounte Murray (5)	Target Center; 0	5–5
11	January 12	@ Oklahoma City	W 112–102	Lonnie Walker IV (24)	LaMarcus Aldridge (10)	Dejounte Murray (7)	Chesapeake Energy Arena; 0	6–5
12	January 14	Houston	L 105–109	Keldon Johnson (29)	Dejounte Murray (8)	DeRozan, Murray (7)	AT&T Center; 0	6–6
13	January 16	Houston	W 103–91	DeMar DeRozan (24)	Dejounte Murray (10)	DeMar DeRozan (4)	AT&T Center; 0	7–6
14	January 18	@ Portland	W 125–104	LaMarcus Aldridge (22)	Dejounte Murray (9)	DeRozan, Murray (11)	Moda Center; 0	8–6
15	January 20	@ Golden State	L 99–121	Dejounte Murray (22)	Keldon Johnson (8)	Johnson, DeRozan, Murray, Mills, Gay (3)	Chase Center; 0	8–7
16	January 22	Dallas	L 117–122	DeMar DeRozan (26)	Keldon Johnson (14)	DeMar DeRozan (6)	AT&T Center; 0	8–8
17	January 24	Washington	W 121–101	Patty Mills (21)	Dejounte Murray (11)	Dejounte Murray (10)	AT&T Center; 0	9–8
–	January 25	@ New Orleans	Postponed (COVID-19) (Makeup date: April 24)					
18	January 27	Boston	W 110–106	DeMar DeRozan (21)	Dejounte Murray (11)	DeMar DeRozan (7)	AT&T Center; 0	10–8
19	January 29	Denver	W 119–109	DeMar DeRozan (30)	Keldon Johnson (9)	DeMar DeRozan (10)	AT&T Center; 0	11–8
20	January 30	Memphis	L 112–129	Derrick White (18)	Jakob Pöltl (7)	Dejounte Murray (7)	AT&T Center; 0	11–9

February: 6–3 (home: 4–2; road: 2–1)

Game	Date	Team	Score	High points	High rebounds	High assists	Location Attendance	Record
21	February 1	Memphis	L 102–133	Keldon Johnson (25)	Keldon Johnson (10)	DeMar DeRozan (6)	AT&T Center; 0	11–10
22	February 3	Minnesota	W 111–108	DeMar DeRozan (30)	Dejounte Murray (11)	Derrick White (8)	AT&T Center; 0	12–10
23	February 6	@ Houston	W 111–106	DeMar DeRozan (30)	Jakob Pöltl (11)	DeMar DeRozan (7)	AT&T Center; 0	13–10
24	February 8	Golden State	W 105–100	Dejounte Murray (27)	Jakob Pöltl (11)	DeMar DeRozan (10)	AT&T Center; 0	14–10
25	February 9	Golden State	L 91–114	Rudy Gay (17)	Gay, Johnson, Vassell (6)	DeRozan, Johnson (6)	AT&T Center; 0	14–11
26	February 12	@ Atlanta	W 125–114	DeMar DeRozan (23)	Jakob Pöltl (12)	DeMar DeRozan (8)	State Farm Arena; 1,451	15–11
27	February 14	@ Charlotte	W 122–110	Dejounte Murray (26)	Dejounte Murray (12)	DeMar DeRozan (9)	Spectrum Center; 0	16–11
—	February 16	@ Detroit	Postponed (COVID-19) (Makeup date: March 15)					
—	February 17	@ Cleveland	Postponed (COVID-19) (Makeup date: March 19)					
—	February 20	@ New York	Postponed (COVID-19) (Makeup date: May 13)					
—	February 22	@ Indiana	Postponed (COVID-19) (Makeup date: April 19)					
28	February 24	@ Oklahoma City	L 99–102	Dejounte Murray (27)	Dejounte Murray (9)	Murray, Pöltl (9)	Chesapeake Energy Arena; 0	16–12
29	February 27	New Orleans	W 117–114	DeMar DeRozan (32)	Jakob Pöltl (11)	DeMar DeRozan (11)	AT&T Center; 0	17–12

March: 7–9 (home: 4–6; road: 3–3)

Game	Date	Team	Score	High points	High rebounds	High assists	Location Attendance	Record
30	March 1	Brooklyn	L 113–124	DeMar DeRozan (22)	Jakob Pöltl (12)	DeMar DeRozan (11)	AT&T Center; 0	17–13
31	March 2	New York	W 119–93	Trey Lyles (18)	Jakob Pöltl (8)	DeMar DeRozan (11)	AT&T Center; 0	18–13
32	March 4	Oklahoma City	L 102–107	DeMar DeRozan (20)	Trey Lyles (10)	Dejounte Murray (10)	AT&T Center; 1,000	18–14
33	March 10	@ Dallas	L 104–115	DeMar DeRozan (30)	Rudy Gay (9)	DeMar DeRozan (11)	American Airlines Center; 3,813	18–15
34	March 12	Orlando	W 104–77	Rudy Gay (19)	Jakob Pöltl (9)	Murray, Pöltl (6)	AT&T Center; 3,241	19–15
35	March 14	@ Philadelphia	L 99–134	Eubanks, White (17)	Dejounte Murray (6)	Derrick White (4)	Wells Fargo Center; 3,071	19–16
36	March 15	@ Detroit	W 109–99	Dejounte Murray (19)	Jakob Pöltl (12)	Dejounte Murray (6)	Little Caesars Arena; 0	20–16
37	March 17	@ Chicago	W 106–99	Jakob Pöltl (20)	Jakob Pöltl (16)	Derrick White (5)	United Center; 0	21–16
38	March 19	@ Cleveland	W 116–110	Keldon Johnson (23)	Keldon Johnson (21)	DeMar DeRozan (7)	Rocket Mortgage FieldHouse; 0	22–16
39	March 20	@ Milwaukee	L 113–120	Lonnie Walker IV (31)	Keldon Johnson (8)	DeMar DeRozan (13)	Fiserv Forum; 3,280	22–17
40	March 22	Charlotte	L 97–100	DeMar DeRozan (28)	Jakob Pöltl (11)	DeMar DeRozan (5)	AT&T Center; 3,222	22–18
41	March 24	L. A. Clippers	L 101–134	DeMar DeRozan (19)	Drew Eubanks (8)	Dejounte Murray (5)	AT&T Center; 3,224	22–19
42	March 25	L. A. Clippers	L 85–98	DeMar DeRozan (23)	Johnson, Pöltl (8)	Dejounte Murray (7)	AT&T Center; 3,225	22–20
43	March 27	Chicago	W 120–104	Jakob Pöltl (20)	Jakob Pöltl (9)	DeRozan, White (7)	AT&T Center; 3,334	23–20
44	March 29	Sacramento	L 115–123	Dejounte Murray (23)	Jakob Pöltl (11)	Dejounte Murray (8)	AT&T Center; 2,876	23–21
45	March 31	Sacramento	W 120–106	DeMar DeRozan (26)	Jakob Pöltl (14)	DeMar DeRozan (7)	AT&T Center; 2,802	24–21

April: 7–10 (home: 1–4; road: 6–6)

Game	Date	Team	Score	High points	High rebounds	High assists	Location Attendance	Record
46	April 1	Atlanta	L 129–134	DeMar DeRozan (36)	Jakob Pöltl (10)	DeMar DeRozan (9)	AT&T Center; 2,949	24–22
47	April 3	Indiana	L 133–139	DeMar DeRozan (25)	Jakob Pöltl (13)	DeMar DeRozan (6)	AT&T Center; 3,276	24–23
48	April 5	Cleveland	L 101–125	DeMar DeRozan (20)	Keldon Johnson (10)	Derrick White (8)	AT&T Center; 2,482	24–24
49	April 7	@ Denver	L 96–106	Murray, White (18)	Rudy Gay (8)	Dejounte Murray (6)	Ball Arena; 3,715	24–25
50	April 9	@ Denver	L 119–121	Derrick White (25)	Jakob Pöltl (10)	DeMar DeRozan (12)	Ball Arena; 3,750	24–26
51	April 11	@ Dallas	W 119–117	DeMar DeRozan (33)	Jakob Pöltl (8)	DeMar DeRozan (8)	American Airlines Center; 4,054	25–26
52	April 12	@ Orlando	W 120–97	DeMar DeRozan (19)	Keldon Johnson (11)	DeRozan, Murray (6)	Amway Center; 3,107	26–26
53	April 14	@ Toronto	L 112–117	Derrick White (25)	Jakob Pöltl (10)	DeMar DeRozan (11)	Amalie Arena; 1,184	26–27
54	April 16	Portland	L 106–107	DeMar DeRozan (26)	Johnson, Murray (13)	DeRozan, Murray (10)	AT&T Center; 4,303	26–28
55	April 17	@ Phoenix	W 111–85	Rudy Gay (19)	Drew Eubanks (13)	Derrick White (6)	Phoenix Suns Arena; 5,078	27–28
56	April 19	@ Indiana	W 104–94	Derrick White (25)	Drew Eubanks (13)	Dejounte Murray (7)	Bankers Life Fieldhouse; 0	28–28
57	April 21	Miami	L 87–107	DeMar DeRozan (15)	Jakob Poeltl (9)	Derrick White (7)	AT&T Center; 4,229	28–29
58	April 22	@ Detroit	W 106–91	Derrick White (26)	Jakob Poeltl (11)	Derrick White (8)	Little Caesars Arena; 3,334	29–29
59	April 24	@ New Orleans	W 110–108	DeMar DeRozan (32)	Keldon Johnson (9)	DeMar DeRozan (8)	Smoothie King Center; 3,700	30–29
60	April 26	@ Washington	W 146–143	DeMar DeRozan (37)	Dejounte Murray (17)	DeMar DeRozan (10)	Capital One Arena; 2,133	31–29
61	April 28	@ Miami	L 111–116	Dejounte Murray (22)	Dejounte Murray (10)	Dejounte Murray (11)	American Airlines Arena; Limited seating	31–30
62	April 30	@ Boston	L 140–143 (OT)	DeMar DeRozan (30)	Jakob Pöltl (10)	DeMar DeRozan (14)	TD Garden; 2,298	31–31

May: 2–8 (home: 1–3; road: 1–5)

Game	Date	Team	Score	High points	High rebounds	High assists	Location Attendance	Record
63	May 2	Philadelphia	L 111–113 (OT)	Lonnie Walker IV (23)	Rudy Gay (10)	Keldon Johnson (5)	AT&T Center; 3,978	31–32
64	May 3	@ Utah	L 99–110	DeMar DeRozan (22)	Rudy Gay (7)	DeMar DeRozan (6)	Vivint Arena; 6,506	31–33
65	May 5	@ Utah	L 94–126	Luka Šamanić (15)	Drew Eubanks (9)	Lonnie Walker IV (5)	Vivint Arena; 6,506	31–34
66	May 7	@ Sacramento	W 113–104	DeMar DeRozan (25)	Jakob Pöltl (10)	Dejounte Murray (7)	Golden 1 Center; 0	32–34
67	May 8	@ Portland	L 102–124	DeMar DeRozan (20)	Lonnie Walker IV (8)	Dejounte Murray (5)	Moda Center; 1,939	32–35
68	May 10	Milwaukee	W 146–125	DeMar DeRozan (23)	Jakob Pöltl (10)	Dejounte Murray (9)	AT&T Center; 3,992	33–35
69	May 12	@ Brooklyn	L 116–128	DeMar DeRozan (21)	Dejounte Murray (11)	DeRozan, Murray (5)	Barclays Center; 1,773	33–36
70	May 13	@ New York	L 98–102	DeMar DeRozan (27)	Murray, Pöltl (9)	Dejounte Murray (7)	Madison Square Garden; 1,981	33–37
71	May 15	Phoenix	L 103–140	Dieng, Johnson (18)	Drew Eubanks (11)	Jones, Mills, Walker IV (5)	AT&T Center; 4,848	33–38
72	May 16	Phoenix	L 121–123	DeMar DeRozan (23)	Jakob Poeltl (10)	Tre Jones (7)	AT&T Center; 4,738	33–39

2020–21 season schedule

=== Play-in ===
2021 play-in game log
Total: 0–1 (Home: 0–0; Road: 0–1)
Play-in: 0–1 (home: 0–0; road: 0–1)

Game	Date	Team	Score	High points	High rebounds	High assists	Location Attendance	Record
1	May 19	@ Memphis	L 96–100	DeRozan, Gay (20)	Dejounte Murray (13)	Dejounte Murray (11)	FedExForum; 7,019	0–1

== Player statistics ==
Legend
GP	Games played	GS	Games started	MPG	Minutes per game
FG%	Field-goal percentage	3P%	3-point field-goal percentage	FT%	Free-throw percentage
RPG	Rebounds per game	APG	Assists per game	SPG	Steals per game
BPG	Blocks per game	PPG	Points per game

=== Regular season ===
San Antonio Spurs statistics
Player	GP	GS	MPG	FG%	3P%	FT%	RPG	APG	SPG	BPG	PPG
Keldon Johnson	69	67	28.5	.479	.331	.740	6.0	1.8	.6	.3	12.8
Jakob Pöltl	69	51	26.7	.616		.508	7.9	1.9	.7	1.8	8.6
Patty Mills	68	1	24.8	.412	.375	.910	1.7	2.4	.6	.0	10.8
Dejounte Murray	67	67	31.9	.453	.317	.791	7.1	5.4	1.5	.1	15.7
Rudy Gay	63	1	21.6	.420	.381	.804	4.8	1.4	.7	.6	11.4
Devin Vassell	62	7	17.0	.406	.347	.843	2.8	.9	.7	.3	5.5
DeMar DeRozan	61	61	33.7	.495	.257	.880	4.2	6.9	.9	.2	21.6
Lonnie Walker IV	60	38	25.4	.420	.355	.814	2.6	1.7	.5	.3	11.2
Drew Eubanks	54	3	14.0	.566	1.000	.726	4.5	.8	.3	.9	5.8
Tre Jones	37	1	7.3	.474	.600	.895	.6	1.1	.2	.0	2.5
Derrick White	36	32	29.6	.411	.346	.851	3.0	3.5	.7	1.0	15.4
Luka Šamanić	33	4	9.3	.448	.279	.552	2.1	.5	.2	.2	3.7
Keita Bates-Diop	30	0	8.2	.448	.294	.667	1.6	.4	.4	.2	2.6
Trey Lyles	23	9	15.6	.478	.350	.652	3.7	.6	.3	.0	5.0
LaMarcus Aldridge^{†}	21	18	25.9	.464	.360	.838	4.5	1.7	.4	.9	13.7
Quinndary Weatherspoon	20	0	6.1	.457	.167	.813	.6	.4	.4	.1	2.3
Gorgui Dieng^{†}	16	0	11.3	.527	.318	.833	2.6	1.2	.6	.1	5.3
Cameron Reynolds^{†}	3	0	2.0	.500			.0	.0	.0	.0	.7

- ^{†} Denotes player spent time with another team in the season. Stats reflect time with the Spurs only.

== Transactions ==
=== Trades ===
March 26, 2021	To San Antonio Spurs Marquese Chriss; Cash considerations	To Golden State Warriors Draft rights to Cady Lalanne (2015, Pick 55)

=== Free agency ===
==== Re-signed ====
Player	Signed
Drew Eubanks	November 24, 2020
Jakob Pöltl	November 24, 2020

==== Additions ====
Player	Signed	Former team
Cameron Reynolds	November 21, 2020	Milwaukee Bucks
Cameron Reynolds	March 26, 2021	Austin Spurs (G League)
Keita Bates-Diop	November 29, 2020	Denver Nuggets
Kylor Kelley	December 10, 2020	Oregon State (Undrafted in 2020)
Khyri Thomas	December 14, 2020	Atlanta Hawks
London Perrantes	December 20, 2020	Capital City Go-Go (G League)
Gorgui Dieng	March 29, 2021	Memphis Grizzlies
DaQuan Jeffries	May 17, 2021	Houston Rockets

==== Subtractions ====
Player	Reason left	New team
Chimezie Metu	Waived	Sacramento Kings
Kylor Kelley	Waived	Austin Spurs (G League)
Khyri Thomas	Waived	Austin Spurs (G League)
Cameron Reynolds	Waived	Austin Spurs (G League)
Tyler Zeller	Waived	—N/a
London Perrantes	Waived	Austin Spurs (G League)
LaMarcus Aldridge	Waived / Buyout	Brooklyn Nets
Marquese Chriss	Waived	Portland Trail Blazers
