= 2020–21 Memphis Grizzlies season =

- Head coach: Taylor Jenkins
- General manager: Jason Wexler
- Owner: Robert Pera
- Arena: FedExForum

Results
- Record: 38–34 (.528)
- Place: Division: 2nd (Southwest); Conference: 9th (Western)
- Playoff finish: First round (lost to Jazz 1–4)
- Stats at Basketball Reference

Local media
- Television: Bally Sports South/Bally Sports Southeast (Note: Formerly Fox Sports South and Fox Sports Southeast until March 31, 2021.)
- Radio: WMFS-FM

The 2020–21 Memphis Grizzlies season was the 26th season of the franchise in the National Basketball Association (NBA) and 20th in Memphis. The Grizzlies qualified for the playoffs for the first time since the 2016–17 season following a victory over the Golden State Warriors in the play-in tournament. However, they lost to the Utah Jazz in five games.

== Draft ==
Round	Pick	Player	Position	Nationality	College/Club
2	40	Robert Woodard II	SF	United States	Mississippi State

Guard Desmond Bane was acquired from the Boston Celtics for two future second-round picks, after they had selected him at #30 overall. He would make the All-Rookie Second Team, having averaged 9.2 points per game on 43.2% shooting from three, the latter of which led all rookies.

They would also trade the rights to Robert Woodard II to Sacramento for #35 overall pick Xavier Tillman, who had played with Jaren Jackson Jr. at Michigan State.

== Roster ==
2020–21 Memphis Grizzlies roster
Players

Pos.	No.	Player	Height	Weight	DOB	From
G	3	Grayson Allen	6 ft 4 in (1.93 m)	198 lb (90 kg)	1995-10-08	Duke
G/F	1	Kyle Anderson	6 ft 9 in (2.06 m)	230 lb (104 kg)	1993-09-20	UCLA
G	22	Desmond Bane	6 ft 5 in (1.96 m)	215 lb (98 kg)	1998-06-25	TCU
G/F	24	Dillon Brooks	6 ft 7 in (2.01 m)	225 lb (102 kg)	1996-01-22	Oregon
F	15	Brandon Clarke	6 ft 8 in (2.03 m)	215 lb (98 kg)	1996-09-19	Gonzaga
G	10	Tim Frazier	6 ft 0 in (1.83 m)	170 lb (77 kg)	1990-11-01	Penn State
F/C	13	Jaren Jackson (injured)	6 ft 11 in (2.11 m)	242 lb (110 kg)	1999-09-15	Michigan State
G	21	Tyus Jones	6 ft 0 in (1.83 m)	196 lb (89 kg)	1996-05-10	Duke
G	46	John Konchar	6 ft 5 in (1.96 m)	210 lb (95 kg)	1996-03-22	Purdue Fort Wayne
F	30	Sean McDermott (TW)	6 ft 6 in (1.98 m)	195 lb (88 kg)	1996-11-03	Butler
G	0	De'Anthony Melton	6 ft 2 in (1.88 m)	200 lb (91 kg)	1998-05-28	USC
G	12	Ja Morant	6 ft 3 in (1.91 m)	174 lb (79 kg)	1999-08-10	Murray State
F/C	4	Jontay Porter (injured)	6 ft 11 in (2.11 m)	240 lb (109 kg)	1999-11-15	Missouri
F/C	35	Killian Tillie (TW)	6 ft 9 in (2.06 m)	220 lb (100 kg)	1998-03-05	Gonzaga
F	2	Xavier Tillman	6 ft 8 in (2.03 m)	245 lb (111 kg)	1999-01-12	Michigan State
C	17	Jonas Valančiūnas	6 ft 11 in (2.11 m)	265 lb (120 kg)	1992-05-06	Lithuania
G/F	7	Justise Winslow (injured)	6 ft 6 in (1.98 m)	222 lb (101 kg)	1996-03-26	Duke

Coaches
Head coach
- Taylor Jenkins
Assistant(s)
- Blake Ahearn
- Brad Jones
- David McClure
- Scoonie Penn
- Vitaly Potapenko
- Darko Rajaković
- Sonia Raman

Legend
- (DP) Unsigned draft pick
- (FA) Free agent
- (S) Suspended
- (GL) On assignment to G League affiliate
- (TW) Two-way affiliate player
- Injured

Roster
Updated: April 24, 2021

== Standings ==
=== Division ===
Southwest Division	W	L	PCT	GB	Home	Road	Div	GP
y – Dallas Mavericks	42	30	.583	–	21‍–‍15	21‍–‍15	7–5	72
x – Memphis Grizzlies	38	34	.528	4.0	18‍–‍18	20‍–‍16	6–6	72
pi – San Antonio Spurs	33	39	.458	9.0	14‍–‍22	19‍–‍17	6–6	72
New Orleans Pelicans	31	41	.431	11.0	18‍–‍18	13‍–‍23	6–6	72
Houston Rockets	17	55	.236	25.0	9‍–‍27	8‍–‍28	5–7	72

=== Conference ===
Western Conference
#	Team	W	L	PCT	GB	GP
1	z – Utah Jazz *	52	20	.722	–	72
2	y – Phoenix Suns *	51	21	.708	1.0	72
3	x – Denver Nuggets	47	25	.653	5.0	72
4	x – Los Angeles Clippers	47	25	.653	5.0	72
5	y – Dallas Mavericks *	42	30	.583	10.0	72
6	x – Portland Trail Blazers	42	30	.583	10.0	72
7	x – Los Angeles Lakers	42	30	.583	10.0	72
8	pi – Golden State Warriors	39	33	.542	13.0	72
9	x – Memphis Grizzlies	38	34	.528	14.0	72
10	pi – San Antonio Spurs	33	39	.458	19.0	72
11	New Orleans Pelicans	31	41	.431	21.0	72
12	Sacramento Kings	31	41	.431	21.0	72
13	Minnesota Timberwolves	23	49	.319	29.0	72
14	Oklahoma City Thunder	22	50	.306	30.0	72
15	Houston Rockets	17	55	.236	35.0	72

Notes

- z – Clinched home court advantage for the entire playoffs
- c – Clinched home court advantage for the conference playoffs
- y – Clinched division title
- x – Clinched playoff spot
- pb – Clinched play-in spot
- o – Eliminated from playoff contention
- * – Division leader

== Game log ==
=== Preseason ===
2020 preseason game log
Total: 3-1; home: 1–1; road: 2–0)
Preseason: 3–1 (home: 1–1; road: 2–0)

Game	Date	Team	Score	High points	High rebounds	High assists	Location Attendance	Record
1	December 12	@ Minnesota	W 107–105	Ja Morant (20)	Jonas Valančiūnas (9)	Ja Morant (11)	Target Center; 0	1–0
2	December 14	@ Minnesota	W 123–104	Jonas Valančiūnas (22)	Kyle Anderson (8)	Ja Morant (7)	Target Center; 0	2–0
3	December 17	Atlanta	W 128–106	Dillon Brooks (24)	Jonas Valančiūnas (13)	Ja Morant (13)	FedEx Forum; 0	3–0
4	December 19	Atlanta	L 116–117	Ja Morant (15)	Jonas Valančiūnas (9)	Ja Morant (8)	FedEx Forum; 0	3–1

2020–21 season schedule

=== Regular season ===
2020–21 game log
Total: 38–34; (home: 18–16; road: 19–17
December: 1–3 (home: 0–2; road: 1–1)

Game	Date	Team	Score	High points	High rebounds	High assists	Location Attendance	Record
1	December 23	San Antonio	L 119–131	Ja Morant (44)	Jonas Valančiūnas (13)	Ja Morant (9)	FedEx Forum; 0	0–1
2	December 26	Atlanta	L 112–122	Ja Morant (28)	Kyle Anderson (14)	Ja Morant (7)	FedEx Forum; 0	0–2
3	December 28	@ Brooklyn	W 116–111	Kyle Anderson (28)	Jonas Valančiūnas (14)	Dillon Brooks (4)	Barclays Center; 0	1–2
4	December 30	@ Boston	L 107–126	Jonas Valančiūnas (20)	Jonas Valančiūnas (11)	Kyle Anderson (9)	TD Garden; 0	1–3

January: 7–3 (home: 3–3; road: 4–0)

Game	Date	Team	Score	High points	High rebounds	High assists	Location Attendance	Record
5	January 1	@ Charlotte	W 108–93	Dillon Brooks (21)	Tyus Jones (12)	Kyle Anderson (11)	Spectrum Center; 0	2–3
6	January 3	L.A. Lakers	L 94–108	Kyle Anderson (18)	Jonas Valančiūnas (10)	Dillon Brooks (5)	FedEx Forum; 0	2–4
7	January 5	L.A. Lakers	L 92–94	Brooks, Dieng, Valančiūnas (13)	Jonas Valančiūnas (11)	Tyus Jones (8)	FedEx Forum; 0	2–5
8	January 7	Cleveland	L 90–94	Jonas Valančiūnas (17)	Jonas Valančiūnas (10)	Tyus Jones (6)	FedEx Forum; 0	2–6
9	January 8	Brooklyn	W 115–110	Dillon Brooks (24)	Brandon Clarke (8)	Tyus Jones (10)	FedEx Forum; 0	3–6
10	January 11	@ Cleveland	W 101–91	Dillon Brooks (21)	Brooks, Valančiūnas (7)	Kyle Anderson (9)	Rocket Mortgage FieldHouse; 0	4–6
11	January 13	@ Minnesota	W 118–107	Jonas Valančiūnas (24)	Jonas Valančiūnas (16)	Tyus Jones (7)	Target Center; 0	5–6
–	January 15	@ Minnesota	Postponed (COVID-19) (Makeup date: May 5)					
12	January 16	Philadelphia	W 106–104	Ja Morant (17)	Brandon Clarke (11)	Ja Morant (6)	FedEx Forum; 0	6–6
13	January 18	Phoenix	W 108–104	Clarke, Morant (17)	Kyle Anderson (8)	Ja Morant (10)	FedEx Forum; 0	7–6
–	January 20	@ Portland	Postponed (COVID-19) (Makeup date: April 23)					
–	January 22	@ Portland	Postponed (COVID-19) (Makeup date: April 25)					
–	January 24	Sacramento	Postponed (COVID-19) (Makeup date: May 13)					
–	January 25	Sacramento	Postponed (COVID-19) (Makeup date: May 14)					
–	January 27	Chicago	Postponed (COVID-19) (Makeup date: April 12)					
14	January 30	@ San Antonio	W 129–112	De'Anthony Melton (20)	Dieng, Konchar (7)	Ja Morant (11)	AT&T Center; 0	8–6

February: 7–9 (home: 4–5; road: 3–4)

Game	Date	Team	Score	High points	High rebounds	High assists	Location Attendance	Record
15	February 1	@ San Antonio	W 133–102	Gorgui Dieng (19)	Dieng, Tillman (9)	Tyus Jones (14)	AT&T Center; 0	9–6
16	February 2	@ Indiana	L 116–134	Dillon Brooks (25)	Dieng, Konchar (6)	De'Anthony Melton (6)	Bankers Life Fieldhouse; 0	9–7
17	February 4	Houston	L 105–113	Desmond Bane (16)	Xavier Tillman (10)	Tyus Jones (8)	FedEx Forum; 0	9–8
18	February 6	@ New Orleans	L 109–118	Jonas Valančiūnas (23)	Xavier Tillman (8)	Ja Morant (9)	Smoothie King Center; 1,440	9–9
19	February 8	Toronto	L 113–128	Jonas Valančiūnas (27)	Jonas Valančiūnas (20)	Ja Morant (9)	FedEx Forum; 1,844	9–10
20	February 10	Charlotte	W 130–114	Kyle Anderson (27)	Jonas Valančiūnas (15)	Ja Morant (11)	FedEx Forum; 1,830	10–10
21	February 12	@ L. A. Lakers	L 105–115	Grayson Allen (23)	Jonas Valančiūnas (8)	Ja Morant (10)	Staples Center; 0	10–11
22	February 14	@ Sacramento	W 124–110	Jonas Valančiūnas (25)	Jonas Valančiūnas (13)	Ja Morant (10)	Golden 1 Center; 0	11–11
23	February 16	New Orleans	L 113–144	Ja Morant (28)	Ja Morant (7)	Ja Morant (8)	FedEx Forum; 1,982	11–12
24	February 17	Oklahoma City	W 122–113	Allen, Valančiūnas (22)	Jonas Valančiūnas (12)	Ja Morant (12)	FedEx Forum; 0	12–12
25	February 19	Detroit	W 109–95	Ja Morant (29)	Jonas Valančiūnas (15)	Grayson Allen (6)	FedEx Forum; 1,795	13–12
26	February 20	Phoenix	L 97–128	Gorgui Dieng (15)	Jonas Valančiūnas (12)	Ja Morant (5)	FedEx Forum; 1,994	13–13
27	February 22	@ Dallas	L 91–102	Ja Morant (22)	Jonas Valančiūnas (15)	Ja Morant (9)	American Airlines Center; 2,099	13–14
28	February 25	L. A. Clippers	W 122–94	Tyus Jones (20)	Jonas Valančiūnas (15)	Ja Morant (7)	FedEx Forum; 1,896	14–14
29	February 26	L. A. Clippers	L 99–119	Jonas Valančiūnas (22)	Jonas Valančiūnas (11)	Ja Morant (5)	FedEx Forum; 2,039	14–15
30	February 28	@ Houston	W 133–84	Justise Winslow (20)	Brandon Clarke (12)	Ja Morant (7)	Toyota Center; 3,284	15–15

March: 7–8 (home: 4–4; road: 3–4)

Game	Date	Team	Score	High points	High rebounds	High assists	Location Attendance	Record
31	March 2	@ Washington	W 125–111	Ja Morant (35)	Jonas Valančiūnas (16)	Ja Morant (10)	Capital One Arena; 0	16–15
32	March 4	Milwaukee	L 111–112	Ja Morant (35)	Jonas Valančiūnas (12)	Dillon Brooks (7)	FedEx Forum; 1,961	16–16
33	March 10	Washington	W 127–112	Jonas Valančiūnas (29)	Jonas Valančiūnas (20)	Ja Morant (10)	FedEx Forum; 1,912	17–16
34	March 12	Denver	L 102–103	Brooks, Clarke (20)	Jonas Valančiūnas (11)	Ja Morant (9)	FedEx Forum; 2,160	17–17
35	March 14	@ Oklahoma City	L 122–128	Ja Morant (22)	Jonas Valančiūnas (14)	Ja Morant (7)	Chesapeake Energy Arena; 0	17–18
36	March 15	@ Phoenix	L 99–122	Jonas Valančiūnas (24)	Jonas Valančiūnas (17)	Ja Morant (4)	Phoenix Suns Arena; 3,188	17–19
37	March 17	Miami	W 89–85	Anderson, Melton, Morant (13)	Jonas Valančiūnas (12)	Melton, Morant (6)	FedEx Forum; 2,217	18–19
38	March 19	Golden State	L 103–116	Allen, Morant (14)	Jonas Valančiūnas (16)	Tyus Jones (7)	FedEx Forum; 2,716	18–20
39	March 20	Golden State	W 111–103	Brooks, Valančiūnas (19)	Jonas Valančiūnas (15)	Ja Morant (8)	FedEx Forum; 0	19–20
40	March 22	Boston	W 132–126 (OT)	Ja Morant (29)	Jonas Valančiūnas (19)	Ja Morant (9)	FedExForum; 2,319	20–20
41	March 24	@ Oklahoma City	W 116–107	Dillon Brooks (25)	Jonas Valančiūnas (15)	Ja Morant (7)	Chesapeake Energy Arena; 0	21–20
42	March 26	@ Utah	L 114–117	Ja Morant (32)	Jonas Valančiūnas (18)	Ja Morant (11)	Vivint Arena; 5,546	21–21
43	March 27	@ Utah	L 110–126	Kyle Anderson (16)	Jonas Valančiūnas (11)	Anderson, Morant (4)	Vivint Arena; 5,546	21–22
44	March 29	@ Houston	W 120–110	Jonas Valančiūnas (30)	Jonas Valančiūnas (15)	Ja Morant (8)	Toyota Center; 3,319	22–22
45	March 31	Utah	L 107–111	Ja Morant (36)	Jonas Valančiūnas (14)	Ja Morant (7)	FedEx Forum; 2,314	22–23

April: 10–7 (home: 3–2; road: 7–5)

Game	Date	Team	Score	High points	High rebounds	High assists	Location Attendance	Record
46	April 2	Minnesota	W 120–108	Jonas Valančiūnas (19)	Jonas Valančiūnas (11)	Anderson, Morant (7)	FedEx Forum; 2,987	23–23
47	April 4	@ Philadelphia	W 116–100	Dillon Brooks (17)	Jonas Valančiūnas (12)	Ja Morant (10)	Wells Fargo Center; 4,094	24–23
48	April 6	@ Miami	W 124–112	Dillon Brooks (28)	Jonas Valančiūnas (10)	Anderson, Konchar (6)	American Airlines Arena; Limited seating	25–23
49	April 7	@ Atlanta	W 131–113	Grayson Allen (30)	Jonas Valančiūnas (11)	Ja Morant (7)	State Farm Arena; 2,774	26–23
50	April 9	@ New York	L 129–133 (OT)	Dillon Brooks (23)	Jonas Valančiūnas (14)	Ja Morant (6)	Madison Square Garden; 1,912	26–24
51	April 11	Indiana	L 125–132	Jonas Valančiūnas (34)	Jonas Valančiūnas (22)	Ja Morant (6)	FedEx Forum; 2,341	26–25
52	April 12	Chicago	W 101–90	Jonas Valančiūnas (26)	Jonas Valančiūnas (14)	Ja Morant (10)	FedEx Forum; 2,194	27–25
53	April 14	Dallas	L 113–114	Grayson Allen (23)	Jonas Valančiūnas (16)	Bane, Jones, Morant (5)	FedEx Forum; 2,141	27–26
54	April 16	@ Chicago	W 126–115	Dillon Brooks (32)	Kyle Anderson (11)	Anderson, Jones (7)	United Center; 0	28–26
55	April 17	@ Milwaukee	W 128–115	Grayson Allen (26)	Anderson, Valančiūnas (8)	Kyle Anderson (8)	Fiserv Forum; 3,280	29–26
56	April 19	@ Denver	L 137–139 (2OT)	Ja Morant (36)	Xavier Tillman (14)	Ja Morant (12)	Ball Arena; 4,005	29–27
57	April 21	@ L. A. Clippers	L 105–117	Ja Morant (22)	Xavier Tillman (12)	Ja Morant (4)	Staples Center; 1,782	29–28
58	April 23	@ Portland	W 130–128	Ja Morant (33)	Kyle Anderson (8)	Ja Morant (13)	Moda Center; 0	30–28
59	April 25	@ Portland	W 120–113	Ja Morant (28)	Jonas Valančiūnas (10)	Desmond Bane (4)	Moda Center; 0	31–28
60	April 26	@ Denver	L 96–120	Ja Morant (27)	Anderson, Jackson Jr. (7)	Ja Morant (6)	Ball Arena; 3,823	31–29
61	April 28	Portland	L 109–130	Jonas Valančiūnas (19)	Brandon Clarke (10)	Ja Morant (8)	FedEx Forum; 3,427	31–30
62	April 30	Orlando	W 92–75	Dillon Brooks (20)	Jonas Valančiūnas (15)	Ja Morant (6)	FedEx Forum; 2,850	32–30

May : 6–4 (home: 4–1; road: 2–3)

Game	Date	Team	Score	High points	High rebounds	High assists	Location Attendance	Record
63	May 1	@ Orlando	L 111–112	Dillon Brooks (23)	Jonas Valančiūnas (16)	Ja Morant (7)	Amway Center; 3,924	32–31
64	May 3	New York	L 104–118	Dillon Brooks (25)	Jonas Valančiūnas (16)	Kyle Anderson (7)	FedExForum; 2,789	32–32
65	May 5	@ Minnesota	W 139–135	Ja Morant (37)	Brandon Clarke (10)	Ja Morant (10)	Target Center; 1,436	33–32
66	May 6	@ Detroit	L 97–111	Ja Morant (20)	Jonas Valančiūnas (16)	Anderson, Morant (5)	Little Caesars Arena; 750	33–33
67	May 8	@ Toronto	W 109–99	Jaren Jackson Jr. (20)	Jonas Valančiūnas (21)	Ja Morant (6)	Amalie Arena; Limited seating	34–33
68	May 10	New Orleans	W 115–110	Dillon Brooks (23)	Jonas Valančiūnas (11)	Ja Morant (12)	FedExForum; 2,507	35–33
69	May 11	Dallas	W 133–104	Ja Morant (24)	Brandon Clarke (9)	Ja Morant (8)	FedExForum; 2,684	36–33
70	May 13	Sacramento	W 116–110	Dillon Brooks (31)	Jonas Valančiūnas (13)	Kyle Anderson (9)	FedExForum; 2,876	37–33
71	May 14	Sacramento	W 107–106	Justise Winslow (25)	Justise Winslow (11)	Justise Winslow (13)	FedExForum; 3,502	38–33
72	May 16	@ Golden State	L 101–113	Jonas Valančiūnas (29)	Jonas Valančiūnas (16)	Ja Morant (9)	Chase Center; 4,416	38–34

2020–21 season schedule

=== Play-in ===
2021 play-in game log
Total: 2–0 (home: 1–0; road: 1–0)
Play-in: 2–0 (home: 1–0; road: 1–0)

Game	Date	Team	Score	High points	High rebounds	High assists	Location Attendance	Record
1	May 19	San Antonio	W 100–96	Dillon Brooks (24)	Jonas Valančiūnas (23)	Ja Morant (6)	FedExForum; 7,019	1–0
2	May 21	@ Golden State	W 117–112 (OT)	Ja Morant (35)	Jonas Valančiūnas (12)	Anderson, Morant (6)	Chase Center; 7,505	2–0

=== Playoffs ===
2021 playoff game log
Total: 1–4 (home: 0–2; road: 1–2)
First round: 1–4 (home: 0–2; road: 1–2)

Game	Date	Team	Score	High points	High rebounds	High assists	Location Attendance	Series
1	May 23	@ Utah	W 112–109	Dillon Brooks (31)	Jonas Valančiūnas (12)	Ja Morant (4)	Vivint Arena; 13,750	1–0
2	May 26	@ Utah	L 129–141	Ja Morant (47)	Anderson, Valančiūnas (6)	Ja Morant (7)	Vivint Arena; 14,200	1–1
3	May 29	Utah	L 111–121	Ja Morant (28)	Anderson, Valančiūnas (13)	Ja Morant (7)	FedExForum; 12,185	1–2
4	May 31	Utah	L 113–120	Ja Morant (23)	Jonas Valančiūnas (12)	Ja Morant (12)	FedExForum; 12,185	1–3
5	June 2	@ Utah	L 110–126	Brooks, Morant (27)	Jackson Jr., Morant (7)	Ja Morant (11)	Vivint Arena; 14,250	1–4

2021 playoff schedule

== Player statistics ==
=== Regular season ===
Player	POS	GP	GS	MP	REB	AST	STL	BLK	PTS	MPG	RPG	APG	SPG	BPG	PPG
Tyus Jones	PG	70	9	1,222	140	259	64	6	442	17.5	2.0	3.7	.9	.1	6.3
Kyle Anderson	PF	69	69	1,887	396	250	84	57	854	27.3	5.7	3.6	1.2	.8	12.4
Desmond Bane	SG	68	17	1,519	210	118	41	16	625	22.3	3.1	1.7	.6	.2	9.2
Dillon Brooks	SF	67	67	1,997	196	157	78	26	1,151	29.8	2.9	2.3	1.2	.4	17.2
Ja Morant	PG	63	63	2,053	252	465	57	13	1,204	32.6	4.0	7.4	.9	.2	19.1
Jonas Valančiūnas	C	62	61	1,755	776	112	35	57	1,058	28.3	12.5	1.8	.6	.9	17.1
Brandon Clarke	PF	59	16	1,415	328	95	60	51	610	24.0	5.6	1.6	1.0	.9	10.3
Xavier Tillman	PF	59	12	1,085	256	75	44	33	390	18.4	4.3	1.3	.7	.6	6.6
De'Anthony Melton	PG	52	1	1,045	161	132	60	31	472	20.1	3.1	2.5	1.2	.6	9.1
Grayson Allen	SG	50	38	1,259	160	108	46	8	532	25.2	3.2	2.2	.9	.2	10.6
John Konchar	SG	43	0	575	128	47	30	9	184	13.4	3.0	1.1	.7	.2	4.3
Justise Winslow	SF	26	1	507	118	50	15	12	178	19.5	4.5	1.9	.6	.5	6.8
Gorgui Dieng^{†}	C	22	1	371	98	29	17	14	173	16.9	4.5	1.3	.8	.6	7.9
Frank Ntilikina^{†}	C	18	1	182	24	8	5	8	57	10.1	1.3	.4	.3	.4	3.2
Sean McDermott	SF	18	0	158	19	4	2	3	39	8.8	1.1	.2	.1	.2	2.2
Jaren Jackson Jr.	C	11	4	258	62	12	12	18	158	23.5	5.6	1.1	1.1	1.6	14.4
Jontay Porter	PF	11	0	54	14	1	3	1	22	4.9	1.3	.1	.3	.1	2.0
Tim Frazier	PG	5	0	62	8	16	2	1	8	12.4	1.6	3.2	.4	.2	1.6

- ^{†} Denotes player spent time with another team in the season. Stats reflect time with the Grizzlies only.

=== Playoffs ===
Player	POS	GP	GS	MP	REB	AST	STL	BLK	PTS	MPG	RPG	APG	SPG	BPG	PPG
Ja Morant	PG	5	5	203	24	41	2	0	151	40.6	4.8	8.2	.4	.0	30.2
Dillon Brooks	SF	5	5	175	21	11	7	2	129	35.0	4.2	2.2	1.4	.4	25.8
Jonas Valančiūnas	C	5	5	166	49	13	3	3	75	33.2	9.8	2.6	.6	.6	15.0
Kyle Anderson	PF	5	5	142	25	16	14	0	42	28.4	5.0	3.2	2.8	.0	8.4
Jaren Jackson Jr.	C	5	5	137	28	5	5	6	68	27.4	5.6	1.0	1.0	1.2	13.6
Grayson Allen	SG	5	0	116	13	1	2	1	32	23.2	2.6	.2	.4	.2	6.4
Desmond Bane	SG	5	0	99	17	10	4	2	28	19.8	3.4	2.0	.8	.4	5.6
De'Anthony Melton	PG	5	0	83	16	5	1	4	31	16.6	3.2	1.0	.2	.8	6.2
Tyus Jones	PG	5	0	47	7	6	1	0	15	9.4	1.4	1.2	.2	.0	3.0
Xavier Tillman	PF	3	0	18	3	1	1	0	2	6.0	1.0	.3	.3	.0	.7
Brandon Clarke	PF	2	0	9	1	0	0	1	2	4.5	.5	.0	.0	.5	1.0
John Konchar	SG	1	0	3	1	0	0	1	0	3.0	1.0	.0	.0	1.0	.0
Justise Winslow	SF	1	0	3	1	1	0	0	0	3.0	1.0	1.0	.0	.0	.0

== Transactions ==
=== Trades ===
November 19, 2020	To Memphis Grizzlies Draft rights to Xavier Tillman (No. 35)	To Sacramento Kings Draft rights to Robert Woodard II (No. 40); 2022 second-round pick
November 20, 2020	To Memphis Grizzlies Mario Hezonja (from Portland); Draft rights to Desmond Bane (No. 30) (from Boston)	To Boston Celtics 2023 second-round pick (from Memphis); 2025 second-round pick (from Memphis)
November 20, 2020	To Portland Trail Blazers Enes Kanter (from Boston); Cash considerations (from Memphis)	

=== Free agency ===
==== Additions ====
Player	Signed	Former team
Jahlil Tripp	Exhibit 10 contract	Pacific Tigers
Sean McDermott	Two-way contract	Butler Bulldogs
Killian Tillie	Two-way contract	Gonzaga Bulldogs
Ahmad Caver	Exhibit 10 contract	Old Dominion Monarchs
Zhaire Smith	Exhibit 10 contract	Detroit Pistons
Bennie Boatwright	Exhibit 10 contract	Memphis Hustle
Christian Vital	Exhibit 10 contract	(Germany) BG Göttingen
Shaq Buchanan	Exhibit 10 contract	Memphis Hustle
Tim Frazier	Two 10-day contracts / Rest-of-season contract	Detroit Pistons
Jontay Porter	2-year contract	Missouri Tigers

==== Subtractions ====
Player	Reason left	New Team
Mario Hezonja	Waived	(Greece) Panathinaikos B.C. / (Russia) BC UNICS
Marko Gudurić	Waived	(Turkey) Fenerbahçe
Jahlil Tripp	Waived	Memphis Hustle
Zhaire Smith	Waived	Memphis Hustle
Christian Vital	Waived	Memphis Hustle
Bennie Boatwright	Waived	Memphis Hustle
Shaq Buchanan	Waived	Memphis Hustle
Ahmad Caver	Waived	Memphis Hustle
Gorgui Dieng	Waived	San Antonio Spurs

== Awards and records ==
Player	Award	Date awarded	Ref.
Desmond Bane	NBA All-Rookie Second Team	June 17, 2021	
