= 2020–21 Portland Trail Blazers season =

NBA professional basketball team season

- Head coach: Terry Stotts
- General manager: Neil Olshey
- Owners: Jody Allen
- Arena: Moda Center

Results
- Record: 42–30 (.583)
- Place: Division: 3rd (Northwest); Conference: 6th (Western)
- Playoff finish: First round (lost to Nuggets 2–4)
- Stats at Basketball Reference

Local media
- Television: NBC Sports Northwest
- Radio: KPOJ, Portland Trail Blazers Radio

The 2020–21 Portland Trail Blazers season was the franchise's 51st season in the National Basketball Association (NBA). The Trail Blazers entered the season following a playoff defeat from the Los Angeles Lakers in the first round of the play-in tournament. After the Toronto Raptors and Houston Rockets failed to qualify for the postseason for the first time since the 2012–13 and 2011–12 season respectively, the Trail Blazers held the longest active playoff streak in the NBA qualifying every year since the 2013–14 season. In the first round, the Trail Blazers faced the Denver Nuggets, where they lost in six games.

Following the playoff exit, the Trail Blazers and head coach Terry Stotts mutually agreed to part ways after nine years. Until 2026, this was Portland's last playoff appearance.

== Draft picks ==
Round	Pick	Player	Position	Nationality	School / club team
1	16	Isaiah Stewart	PF/C	United States	Washington
2	46	C. J. Elleby	SG	United States	Washington State

== Roster ==
2020–21 Portland Trail Blazers roster
Players

Pos.	No.	Player	Height	Weight	DOB	From
F	00	Carmelo Anthony	6 ft 8 in (2.03 m)	238 lb (108 kg)	1984-05-29	Syracuse
G	21	Keljin Blevins (TW)	6 ft 4 in (1.93 m)	200 lb (91 kg)	1995-11-24	Montana State
C	33	Zach Collins	7 ft 0 in (2.13 m)	250 lb (113 kg)	1997-11-19	Gonzaga
F	23	Robert Covington	6 ft 7 in (2.01 m)	209 lb (95 kg)	1990-12-14	Tennessee State
G	16	C. J. Elleby	6 ft 6 in (1.98 m)	200 lb (91 kg)	2000-06-16	Washington State
C	4	Harry Giles	6 ft 11 in (2.11 m)	240 lb (109 kg)	1998-04-22	Duke
F	2	Rondae Hollis-Jefferson	6 ft 7 in (2.01 m)	217 lb (98 kg)	1995-01-03	Arizona
G/F	5	Derrick Jones	6 ft 5 in (1.96 m)	210 lb (95 kg)	1997-02-15	UNLV
F	11	Enes Kanter	6 ft 11 in (2.11 m)	250 lb (113 kg)	1992-05-20	Turkey
F	18	T. J. Leaf (TW)	6 ft 10 in (2.08 m)	222 lb (101 kg)	1997-04-30	UCLA
G	0	Damian Lillard	6 ft 2 in (1.88 m)	195 lb (88 kg)	1990-07-15	Weber State
G/F	9	Nassir Little	6 ft 5 in (1.96 m)	220 lb (100 kg)	2000-02-11	North Carolina
G	3	CJ McCollum	6 ft 3 in (1.91 m)	190 lb (86 kg)	1991-09-19	Lehigh
C	27	Jusuf Nurkić	7 ft 0 in (2.13 m)	290 lb (132 kg)	1994-08-23	Bosnia and Herzegovina
G	24	Norman Powell	6 ft 3 in (1.91 m)	215 lb (98 kg)	1993-05-25	UCLA
G	1	Anfernee Simons	6 ft 3 in (1.91 m)	181 lb (82 kg)	1999-06-08	IMG Academy (FL)

Coaches
Head coach
- Terry Stotts
Assistant(s)
- John McCullough
- Jim Moran
- Dale Osbourne
- Jannero Pargo
- Nate Tibbetts (Associate HC)

Legend
- (DP) Unsigned draft pick
- (FA) Free agent
- (S) Suspended
- (GL) On assignment to G League
- (TW) Two-way affiliate player
- Injured

Roster
Updated: April 28, 2021

== Standings ==
=== Division ===
Northwest Division	W	L	PCT	GB	Home	Road	Div	GP
z – Utah Jazz	52	20	.722	–	31‍–‍5	21‍–‍15	7–5	72
x – Denver Nuggets	47	25	.653	5.0	25‍–‍11	22‍–‍14	9–3	72
x – Portland Trail Blazers	42	30	.583	10.0	20‍–‍16	22‍–‍14	6–6	72
Minnesota Timberwolves	23	49	.319	29.0	13‍–‍23	10‍–‍26	5–7	72
Oklahoma City Thunder	22	50	.306	30.0	10‍–‍26	12‍–‍24	3–9	72

=== Conference ===
Western Conference
#	Team	W	L	PCT	GB	GP
1	z – Utah Jazz *	52	20	.722	–	72
2	y – Phoenix Suns *	51	21	.708	1.0	72
3	x – Denver Nuggets	47	25	.653	5.0	72
4	x – Los Angeles Clippers	47	25	.653	5.0	72
5	y – Dallas Mavericks *	42	30	.583	10.0	72
6	x – Portland Trail Blazers	42	30	.583	10.0	72
7	x – Los Angeles Lakers	42	30	.583	10.0	72
8	pi – Golden State Warriors	39	33	.542	13.0	72
9	x – Memphis Grizzlies	38	34	.528	14.0	72
10	pi – San Antonio Spurs	33	39	.458	19.0	72
11	New Orleans Pelicans	31	41	.431	21.0	72
12	Sacramento Kings	31	41	.431	21.0	72
13	Minnesota Timberwolves	23	49	.319	29.0	72
14	Oklahoma City Thunder	22	50	.306	30.0	72
15	Houston Rockets	17	55	.236	35.0	72

Notes

- z – Clinched home court advantage for the entire playoffs
- c – Clinched home court advantage for the conference playoffs
- y – Clinched division title
- x – Clinched playoff spot
- pb – Clinched play-in spot
- o – Eliminated from playoff contention
- * – Division leader

== Game log ==
=== Preseason ===
2020 preseason game log
Total: 1–3 (home: 1–1; road: 0–2)
Preseason: 1–3 (home: 1–1; road: 0–2)

Game	Date	Team	Score	High points	High rebounds	High assists	Location Attendance	Record
1	December 11	Sacramento	W 127–102	Carmelo Anthony (21)	Harry Giles (14)	Lillard, McColllum (5)	Moda Center; 0	1–0
2	December 13	Sacramento	L 101–126	Harry Giles (19)	Harry Giles (13)	Rodney Hood (4)	Moda Center; 0	1–1
3	December 16	@ Denver	L 95–126	Robert Covington (15)	Jusuf Nurkic (8)	Damian Lillard (4)	Ball Arena; 0	1–2
4	December 18	@ Denver	L 96–129	CJ McCollum (26)	Enes Kanter (9)	Jusuf Nurkic (4)	Ball Arena; 0	1–3

2020–21 season schedule

=== Regular season ===
2020–21 game log
Total: 42–30 (home: 20–16; road: 22–14)
December: 2–2 (home: 1–1; road: 1–1)

Game	Date	Team	Score	High points	High rebounds	High assists	Location Attendance	Record
1	December 23	Utah	L 100–120	CJ McCollum (23)	Enes Kanter (8)	Damian Lillard (7)	Moda Center; 0	0–1
2	December 26	Houston	W 128–126 (OT)	CJ McCollum (44)	Jusuf Nurkic (11)	Damian Lillard (9)	Moda Center; 0	1–1
3	December 28	@ L. A. Lakers	W 115–107	Damian Lillard (31)	Enes Kanter (14)	CJ McCollum (11)	Staples Center; 0	2–1
4	December 30	@ L. A. Clippers	L 105–128	CJ McCollum (25)	Enes Kanter (10)	Damian Lillard (4)	Staples Center; 0	2–2

January: 8–6 (home: 4–4; road: 4–2)

Game	Date	Team	Score	High points	High rebounds	High assists	Location Attendance	Record
5	January 1	@ Golden State	W 123–98	Damian Lillard (34)	Robert Covington (11)	Damian Lillard (8)	Chase Center; 0	3–2
6	January 3	@ Golden State	L 122–137	Damian Lillard (32)	Enes Kanter (12)	CJ McCollum (5)	Chase Center; 0	3–3
7	January 5	Chicago	L 108–111	CJ McCollum (26)	Jusuf Nurkic (11)	Damian Lillard (9)	Moda Center; 0	3–4
8	January 7	Minnesota	W 135–117	Damian Lillard (39)	Kanter, Lillard, Nurkic (7)	Damian Lillard (7)	Moda Center; 0	4–4
9	January 9	@ Sacramento	W 125–99	CJ McCollum (37)	Enes Kanter (15)	Damian Lillard (6)	Golden 1 Center; 0	5–4
10	January 11	Toronto	W 112–111	CJ McCollum (30)	Robert Covington (8)	Lillard, McCollum (5)	Moda Center; 0	6–4
11	January 13	@ Sacramento	W 132–126	Damian Lillard (40)	Jusuf Nurkic (13)	Damian Lillard (13)	Golden 1 Center; 0	7–4
12	January 14	Indiana	L 87–111	Lillard, McCollum (22)	Enes Kanter (9)	Lillard, McCollum (4)	Moda Center; 0	7–5
13	January 16	Atlanta	W 112–106	Damian Lillard (36)	Enes Kanter (15)	Damian Lillard (7)	Moda Center; 0	8–5
14	January 18	San Antonio	L 104–125	Damian Lillard (35)	Enes Kanter (8)	Damian Lillard (6)	Moda Center; 0	8–6
–	January 20	Memphis	Postponed (COVID-19) (Makeup date: April 23)					
–	January 22	Memphis	Postponed (COVID-19) (Makeup date: April 25)					
15	January 24	New York	W 116–113	Damian Lillard (39)	Kanter, Giles (8)	Damian Lillard (8)	Moda Center; 0	9–6
16	January 25	Oklahoma City	L 122–125	Lillard, Simons (26)	Enes Kanter (22)	Damian Lillard (10)	Moda Center; 0	9–7
17	January 28	@ Houston	L 101–104	Damian Lillard (30)	Enes Kanter (13)	Damian Lillard (9)	Toyota Center; 3,154	9–8
18	January 30	@ Chicago	W 123–122	Damian Lillard (44)	Enes Kanter (11)	Damian Lillard (9)	United Center; 0	10–8

February: 8–6 (home: 3–1; road: 5–5)

Game	Date	Team	Score	High points	High rebounds	High assists	Location Attendance	Record
19	February 1	@ Milwaukee	L 106–134	Nassir Little (30)	Enes Kanter (11)	Damian Lillard (7)	Fiserv Forum; 0	10–9
20	February 2	@ Washington	W 132–121	Damian Lillard (32)	Enes Kanter (15)	Damian Lillard (8)	Capital One Arena; 0	11–9
21	February 4	@ Philadelphia	W 121–105	Gary Trent Jr. (24)	Enes Kanter (18)	Carmelo Anthony (5)	Wells Fargo Center; 0	12–9
22	February 6	@ New York	L 99–110	Damian Lillard (29)	Enes Kanter (11)	Damian Lillard (9)	Madison Square Garden; 0	12–10
23	February 9	Orlando	W 106–97	Damian Lillard (36)	Robert Covington (11)	Gary Trent Jr. (6)	Moda Center; 0	13–10
24	February 11	Philadelphia	W 118–114	Damian Lillard (30)	Enes Kanter (14)	Damian Lillard (7)	Moda Center; 0	14–10
25	February 12	Cleveland	W 129–110	Gary Trent Jr. (26)	Enes Kanter (13)	Damian Lillard (9)	Moda Center; 0	15–10
26	February 14	@ Dallas	W 121–118	Damian Lillard (34)	Enes Kanter (8)	Damian Lillard (11)	American Airlines Center; 2,211	16–10
27	February 16	@ Oklahoma City	W 115–104	Damian Lillard (31)	Enes Kanter (21)	Damian Lillard (10)	Chesapeake Energy Arena; 0	17–10
28	February 17	@ New Orleans	W 126–124	Damian Lillard (43)	Robert Covington (8)	Damian Lillard (16)	Smoothie King Center; 1,940	18–10
29	February 20	Washington	L 111–118	Damian Lillard (35)	Enes Kanter (13)	Damian Lillard (12)	Moda Center; 0	18–11
30	February 22	@ Phoenix	L 100–132	Damian Lillard (24)	Enes Kanter (15)	Damian Lillard (7)	Phoenix Suns Arena; 3,213	18–12
31	February 23	@ Denver	L 106–111	Damian Lillard (25)	Enes Kanter (14)	Damian Lillard (13)	Ball Arena; 0	18–13
32	February 26	@ L. A. Lakers	L 93–102	Damian Lillard (35)	Enes Kanter (17)	Damian Lillard (7)	Staples Center; 0	18–14

March: 11–4 (home: 6–3; road: 5–1)

Game	Date	Team	Score	High points	High rebounds	High assists	Location Attendance	Record
33	March 1	Charlotte	W 123–111	Carmelo Anthony (29)	Enes Kanter (11)	Damian Lillard (10)	Moda Center; 0	19–14
34	March 3	Golden State	W 108–106	Anthony, Lillard (22)	Enes Kanter (14)	Damian Lillard (6)	Moda Center; 0	20–14
35	March 4	Sacramento	W 123–119	Damian Lillard (44)	Enes Kanter (21)	Damian Lillard (7)	Moda Center; 0	21–14
All-Star Break
36	March 11	Phoenix	L 121–127	Damian Lillard (30)	Enes Kanter (11)	Damian Lillard (8)	Moda Center; 0	21–15
37	March 13	@ Minnesota	W 125–121	Carmelo Anthony (26)	Enes Kanter (11)	Damian Lillard (10)	Target Center; 0	22–15
38	March 14	@ Minnesota	L 112–114	Damian Lillard (38)	Enes Kanter (11)	Anthony, Covington (5)	Target Center; 0	22–16
39	March 16	New Orleans	W 125–124	Damian Lillard (50)	Damian Lillard (6)	Damian Lillard (10)	Moda Center; 0	23–16
40	March 18	New Orleans	W 101–93	Damian Lillard (36)	Enes Kanter (13)	Anthony, McCollum, Trent (2)	Moda Center; 0	24–16
41	March 19	Dallas	W 125–119	CJ McCollum (32)	Enes Kanter (9)	Damian Lillard (6)	Moda Center; 0	25–16
42	March 21	Dallas	L 92–132	Damian Lillard (19)	Covington, Kanter (6)	Damian Lillard (4)	Moda Center; 0	25–17
43	March 23	Brooklyn	L 112–116	Damian Lillard (22)	Enes Kanter (19)	Damian Lillard (9)	Moda Center; 0	25–18
44	March 25	@ Miami	W 125–122	CJ McCollum (35)	Enes Kanter (16)	Damian Lillard (9)	American Airlines Arena; 2,000	26–18
45	March 26	@ Orlando	W 112–105	McCollum, Powell (22)	Enes Kanter (15)	CJ McCollum (7)	Amway Center; 3,827	27–18
46	March 28	@ Toronto	W 122–117	CJ McCollum (23)	Robert Covington (12)	Damian Lillard (11)	Amalie Arena; 2,021	28–18
47	March 31	@ Detroit	W 124–101	Damian Lillard (33)	Enes Kanter (8)	Damian Lillard (10)	Little Caesars Arena; 0	29–18

April: 6–10 (home: 2–7; road: 4–3)

Game	Date	Team	Score	High points	High rebounds	High assists	Location Attendance	Record
48	April 2	Milwaukee	L 109–127	Damian Lillard (32)	Jusuf Nurkic (11)	CJ McCollum (7)	Moda Center; 0	29–19
49	April 3	Oklahoma City	W 133–85	CJ McCollum (20)	Enes Kanter (17)	Damian Lillard (6)	Moda Center; 0	30–19
50	April 6	@ L. A. Clippers	L 116–133	Norman Powell (32)	Enes Kanter (15)	Lillard, McCollum (6)	Staples Center; 0	30–20
51	April 8	@ Utah	L 103–122	Damian Lillard (23)	Enes Kanter (7)	Damian Lillard (6)	Vivint Arena; 5,546	30–21
52	April 10	Detroit	W 118–103	Damian Lillard (27)	Enes Kanter (30)	Damian Lillard (10)	Moda Center; 0	31–21
53	April 11	Miami	L 98–107	McCollum, Powell (17)	Jusuf Nurkic (9)	Covington, Nurkic (4)	Moda Center; 0	31–22
54	April 13	Boston	L 115–116	Damian Lillard (28)	Enes Kanter (10)	Damian Lillard (10)	Moda Center; 0	31–23
55	April 16	@ San Antonio	W 107–106	CJ McCollum (29)	Enes Kanter (13)	CJ McCollum (6)	AT&T Center; 4,303	32–23
56	April 18	@ Charlotte	L 101–109	Carmelo Anthony (24)	Covington, Kanter (7)	CJ McCollum (6)	Spectrum Center; 3,880	32–24
57	April 20	L. A. Clippers	L 112–113	CJ McCollum (28)	Nassir Little (10)	CJ McCollum (5)	Moda Center; 0	32–25
58	April 21	Denver	L 105–106	Damian Lillard (22)	CJ McCollum (9)	Jusuf Nurkic (6)	Moda Center; 0	32–26
59	April 23	Memphis	L 128–130	Damian Lillard (26)	Jusuf Nurkic (17)	CJ McCollum (7)	Moda Center; 0	32–27
60	April 25	Memphis	L 113–120	CJ McCollum (27)	Jusuf Nurkic (19)	Lillard, Nurkic (5)	Moda Center; 0	32–28
61	April 27	@ Indiana	W 133–112	Anfernee Simons (27)	Enes Kanter (14)	Damian Lillard (6)	Bankers Life Fieldhouse; 0	33–28
62	April 28	@ Memphis	W 130–109	CJ McCollum (26)	Jusuf Nurkic (9)	CJ McCollum (6)	FedEx Forum; 3,427	34–28
63	April 30	@ Brooklyn	W 128–109	Damian Lillard (32)	Jusuf Nurkic (11)	Damian Lillard (9)	Barclays Center; 1,773	35–28

May: 7–2 (home: 4–0; road: 3–2)

Game	Date	Team	Score	High points	High rebounds	High assists	Location Attendance	Record
64	May 2	@ Boston	W 129–119	CJ McCollum (33)	Jusuf Nurkic (11)	Damian Lillard (13)	TD Garden; 2,298	36–28
65	May 3	@ Atlanta	L 114–123	Damian Lillard (33)	Jusuf Nurkic (10)	Lillard, McCollum (8)	State Farm Arena; 3,091	36–29
66	May 5	@ Cleveland	W 141–105	Damian Lillard (32)	Enes Kanter (13)	Damian Lillard (9)	Rocket Mortgage FieldHouse; 4,148	37–29
67	May 7	L. A. Lakers	W 106–101	Damian Lillard (38)	Jusuf Nurkic (13)	Damian Lillard (7)	Moda Center; 1,939	38–29
68	May 8	San Antonio	W 124–102	Damian Lillard (30)	Robert Covington (11)	Damian Lillard (8)	Moda Center; 1,939	39–29
69	May 10	Houston	W 140–129	Damian Lillard (34)	Enes Kanter (10)	CJ McCollum (7)	Moda Center; 1,939	40–29
70	May 12	@ Utah	W 105–98	Damian Lillard (30)	Jusuf Nurkic (15)	Lillard, Nurkic (6)	Vivint Arena; 6,506	41–29
71	May 13	@ Phoenix	L 117–118	Damian Lillard (41)	Kanter, Nurkic (8)	CJ McCollum (6)	Phoenix Suns Arena; 8,359	41–30
72	May 16	Denver	W 132–116	CJ McCollum (24)	Enes Kanter (15)	Damian Lillard (10)	Moda Center; 1,939	42–30

2020–21 season schedule

=== Playoffs ===
2021 playoff game log
Total: 2–4 (home: 1–2; road: 1–2)
First round: 2–4 (home: 1–2; road: 1–2)

Game	Date	Team	Score	High points	High rebounds	High assists	Location Attendance	Series
1	May 22	@ Denver	W 123–109	Damian Lillard (34)	Jusuf Nurkić (12)	Damian Lillard (13)	Ball Arena; 7,732	1–0
2	May 24	@ Denver	L 109–128	Damian Lillard (42)	Jusuf Nurkić (13)	Damian Lillard (10)	Ball Arena; 7,727	1–1
3	May 27	Denver	L 115–120	Damian Lillard (37)	Jusuf Nurkić (13)	Jusuf Nurkić (6)	Moda Center; 8,050	1–2
4	May 29	Denver	W 115–95	Norman Powell (29)	Robert Covington (9)	Damian Lillard (10)	Moda Center; 8,050	2–2
5	June 1	@ Denver	L 140–147 (2OT)	Damian Lillard (55)	Covington, Nurkić (11)	Damian Lillard (10)	Ball Arena; 10,463	2–3
6	June 3	Denver	L 115–126	Damian Lillard (28)	Robert Covington (10)	Damian Lillard (13)	Moda Center; 10,022	2–4

2021 playoff schedule

== Player statistics ==
Legend
GP	Games played	GS	Games started	MPG	Minutes per game
FG%	Field-goal percentage	3P%	3-point field-goal percentage	FT%	Free-throw percentage
RPG	Rebounds per game	APG	Assists per game	SPG	Steals per game
BPG	Blocks per game	PPG	Points per game

=== Regular season ===
Portland Trail Blazers statistics
Player	GP	GS	MPG	FG%	3P%	FT%	RPG	APG	SPG	BPG	PPG
Enes Kanter Freedom	72	35	24.4	.604	.250	.774	11.0	1.2	.5	.7	11.2
Robert Covington	70	70	32.0	.401	.379	.806	6.7	1.7	1.4	1.2	8.5
Carmelo Anthony	69	3	24.5	.421	.409	.890	3.1	1.5	.7	.6	13.4
Damian Lillard	67	67	35.8	.451	.391	.928	4.2	7.5	.9	.3	28.8
Anfernee Simons	64	0	17.3	.419	.426	.807	2.2	1.4	.3	.1	7.8
Derrick Jones Jr.	58	43	22.7	.484	.316	.648	3.5	.8	.6	.9	6.8
Nassir Little	48	2	13.3	.467	.350	.800	2.7	.5	.1	.3	4.6
CJ McCollum	47	47	34.0	.458	.402	.812	3.9	4.7	.9	.4	23.1
Gary Trent Jr.^{†}	41	23	30.8	.414	.397	.773	2.2	1.4	.9	.1	15.0
Rodney Hood^{†}	38	5	19.1	.363	.298	.750	1.9	1.2	.5	.1	4.7
Harry Giles III	38	0	9.2	.433	.348	.593	3.5	.8	.2	.3	2.8
Jusuf Nurkić	37	37	23.8	.514	.400	.619	9.0	3.4	1.0	1.1	11.5
C. J. Elleby	30	0	6.4	.379	.206	.733	1.1	.3	.2	.1	2.3
Norman Powell^{†}	27	27	34.4	.443	.361	.880	3.3	1.9	1.3	.4	17.0
Keljin Blevins	17	0	4.4	.250	.250		.6	.2	.1	.0	.7
Rondae Hollis-Jefferson	11	1	9.7	.500	.000	.563	2.4	1.2	.2	.4	2.5
T. J. Leaf	7	0	5.0	.500		1.000	.7	.1	.3	.1	1.7

=== Playoffs ===
Portland Trail Blazers statistics
Player	GP	GS	MPG	FG%	3P%	FT%	RPG	APG	SPG	BPG	PPG
Damian Lillard	6	6	41.3	.463	.449	.940	4.3	10.2	1.0	.7	34.3
CJ McCollum	6	6	40.0	.439	.333	.769	6.0	4.3	.3	.7	20.7
Robert Covington	6	6	38.0	.500	.500	.900	7.8	1.2	1.5	1.0	9.3
Norman Powell	6	6	36.0	.500	.385	.889	2.2	2.0	.8	1.0	17.0
Jusuf Nurkić	6	6	28.8	.545	.200	.720	10.3	2.7	.5	1.2	13.2
Carmelo Anthony	6	0	23.8	.417	.378	.909	3.2	1.5	.3	.2	12.3
Anfernee Simons	6	0	17.8	.560	.611		2.7	.8	.3	.2	6.5
Enes Kanter Freedom	5	0	11.2	.500		1.000	2.6	.0	.0	.4	2.0
Rondae Hollis-Jefferson	5	0	7.2	.800		.667	1.6	.0	.2	.2	2.0
Nassir Little	3	0	3.0	.250	.250	.500	.3	.0	.0	.3	1.7
T. J. Leaf	3	0	2.3	.750			1.0	.0	.0	.0	2.0
Derrick Jones Jr.	2	0	5.0	.400	.000		.0	.0	.5	.0	2.0
C. J. Elleby	2	0	4.0	.000			1.5	.5	.0	.0	.0
Keljin Blevins	2	0	2.0	.500	.000		.0	.0	.0	.0	1.0
Harry Giles III	1	0	4.0	.000			3.0	.0	.0	.0	.0

- ^{†} Denotes player spent time with another team in the season. Stats reflect time with the Trail Blazers only.

== Transactions ==
=== Trades ===
November 20, 2020	To Portland Trail Blazers Enes Kanter	To Boston Celtics Future MEM draft consideration
November 20, 2020	To Memphis Grizzlies Mario Hezonja; Desmond Bane	
November 22, 2020	To Portland Trail Blazers Robert Covington	To Houston Rockets Trevor Ariza; 2020 first-round pick 2021 protected first-round pick
March 25, 2021	To Portland Trail Blazers Norman Powell	To Toronto Raptors Gary Trent Jr. Rodney Hood

=== Free agency ===
==== Re-signed ====
Player	Signed
Rodney Hood	November 22, 2020
Carmelo Anthony	November 22, 2020

==== Additions ====
Player	Signed	Former team
Derrick Jones Jr.	November 22, 2020	Miami Heat
Harry Giles	November 22, 2020	Sacramento Kings
Rondae Hollis-Jefferson		Toronto Raptors
T. J. Leaf		Indiana Pacers

==== Subtractions ====
Player	Reason left	New team
Jaylen Adams	Free agency	Milwaukee Bucks
Hassan Whiteside	Free agency	Sacramento Kings
Wenyen Gabriel	Free agency	New Orleans Pelicans
Jaylen Hoard	Free agency	Oklahoma City Thunder
Moses Brown	Free agency	Oklahoma City Thunder
Caleb Swanigan	Free agency	N/A
