= 2020–21 Indiana Pacers season =

NBA professional basketball team season

- Head coach: Nate Bjorkgren
- President: Kevin Pritchard
- General manager: Chad Buchanan
- Owners: Herbert Simon
- Arena: Bankers Life Fieldhouse

Results
- Record: 34–38 (.472)
- Place: Division: 2nd (Central); Conference: 9th (Eastern)
- Playoff finish: Did not qualify
- Stats at Basketball Reference

Local media
- Television: Bally Sports Indiana (Note: Formerly Fox Sports Indiana until March 31, 2021)
- Radio: 1070 The Fan

The 2020–21 Indiana Pacers season was Indiana's 54th season as a franchise and 45th season in the National Basketball Association (NBA). The Pacers replaced Nate McMillan, with former Toronto Raptors assistant coach Nate Bjorkgren. During the season, the team acquired Caris LeVert in exchange for Victor Oladipo.

The Pacers missed the playoffs for the first time since 2015 following a loss to the Washington Wizards in the play-in tournament, ending a six-year playoff streak. Due to this, with multiple other factors, Bjorkgren was fired.

== NBA draft ==
Round	Pick	Player	Position	Nationality	College/Club
2	54	Cassius Stanley	SG	United States	Duke

Entering the 2020 NBA draft, the Pacers only held one second-round pick. Their own first-round selection was traded as an incentive to acquire Malcolm Brogdon from the Milwaukee Bucks via sign and trade.

== Roster ==
2020–21 Indiana Pacers roster
Players

Pos.	No.	Player	Height	Weight	DOB	From
C	88	Goga Bitadze	6 ft 11 in (2.11 m)	250 lb (113 kg)	1999-07-20	Georgia
C	37	Amida Brimah (TW)	6 ft 10 in (2.08 m)	230 lb (104 kg)	1994-02-11	Connecticut
G/F	12	Oshae Brissett	6 ft 7 in (2.01 m)	210 lb (95 kg)	1998-06-20	Syracuse
G	7	Malcolm Brogdon	6 ft 5 in (1.96 m)	229 lb (104 kg)	1992-12-11	Virginia
G	3	Aaron Holiday	6 ft 0 in (1.83 m)	185 lb (84 kg)	1996-09-30	UCLA
G/F	8	Justin Holiday	6 ft 6 in (1.98 m)	180 lb (82 kg)	1989-04-05	Washington
G/F	26	Jeremy Lamb	6 ft 5 in (1.96 m)	180 lb (82 kg)	1992-05-30	Connecticut
G	22	Caris LeVert	6 ft 6 in (1.98 m)	205 lb (93 kg)	1994-08-25	Michigan
F	21	Kelan Martin	6 ft 5 in (1.96 m)	230 lb (104 kg)	1995-08-03	Butler
G	9	T. J. McConnell	6 ft 1 in (1.85 m)	190 lb (86 kg)	1992-03-25	Arizona
F	20	Doug McDermott	6 ft 7 in (2.01 m)	225 lb (102 kg)	1992-01-03	Creighton
F/C	11	Domantas Sabonis	6 ft 11 in (2.11 m)	240 lb (109 kg)	1996-05-03	Gonzaga
F	14	JaKarr Sampson	6 ft 7 in (2.01 m)	214 lb (97 kg)	1993-02-20	St. John's
G	2	Cassius Stanley (TW)	6 ft 5 in (1.96 m)	190 lb (86 kg)	1999-08-18	Duke
G	5	Edmond Sumner	6 ft 4 in (1.93 m)	196 lb (89 kg)	1995-12-31	Xavier
F/C	33	Myles Turner (injured)	6 ft 11 in (2.11 m)	250 lb (113 kg)	1996-03-24	Texas
F	1	T. J. Warren (injured)	6 ft 8 in (2.03 m)	220 lb (100 kg)	1993-09-05	NC State

Coaches
Head coach
- Nate Bjorkgren
Assistant(s)
- Kaleb Canales
- Greg Foster
- Tyler Marsh

Legend
- (DP) Unsigned draft pick
- (FA) Free agent
- (S) Suspended
- (GL) On assignment to G League affiliate
- (TW) Two-way affiliate player
- Injured

Roster
Updated: April 23, 2021

== Standings ==
=== Division ===
Central Division	W	L	PCT	GB	Home	Road	Div	GP
y – Milwaukee Bucks	46	26	.639	–	26‍–‍10	20‍–‍16	11–1	72
pi – Indiana Pacers	34	38	.472	12.0	13‍–‍23	21‍–‍15	7–5	72
Chicago Bulls	31	41	.431	15.0	15‍–‍21	16‍–‍20	7–5	72
Cleveland Cavaliers	22	50	.306	24.0	13‍–‍23	9‍–‍27	4–8	72
Detroit Pistons	20	52	.278	26.0	13‍–‍23	7‍–‍29	1–11	72

=== Conference ===
Eastern Conference
#	Team	W	L	PCT	GB	GP
1	c − Philadelphia 76ers *	49	23	.681	–	72
2	x – Brooklyn Nets	48	24	.667	1.0	72
3	y – Milwaukee Bucks *	46	26	.639	3.0	72
4	x – New York Knicks	41	31	.569	8.0	72
5	y – Atlanta Hawks *	41	31	.569	8.0	72
6	x – Miami Heat	40	32	.556	9.0	72
7	x – Boston Celtics	36	36	.500	13.0	72
8	x – Washington Wizards	34	38	.472	15.0	72
9	pi – Indiana Pacers	34	38	.472	15.0	72
10	pi – Charlotte Hornets	33	39	.458	16.0	72
11	Chicago Bulls	31	41	.431	18.0	72
12	Toronto Raptors	27	45	.375	22.0	72
13	Cleveland Cavaliers	22	50	.306	27.0	72
14	Orlando Magic	21	51	.292	28.0	72
15	Detroit Pistons	20	52	.278	29.0	72

Notes

- z – Clinched home-court advantage for the entire playoffs
- c – Clinched home-court advantage for the conference playoffs
- y – Clinched division title
- x – Clinched playoff spot
- * – Division leader

== Game log ==
=== Preseason ===
2020 preseason game log
Total: 0–0 (Home: 0–0; Road: 0–0)
Preseason: 0–0 (home: 0–0; road: 0–0)

Game	Date	Team	Score	High points	High rebounds	High assists	Location Attendance	Record

2020–21 season schedule

=== Regular season ===
2020–21 game log
Total: 34–38 (Home: 13–23; Road: 21–15)
December: 4–1 (home: 3–1; road: 1–0)

Game	Date	Team	Score	High points	High rebounds	High assists	Location Attendance	Record
1	December 23	New York	W 121–107	Domantas Sabonis (32)	Domantas Sabonis (13)	Malcolm Brogdon (8)	Bankers Life Fieldhouse; 0	1–0
2	December 26	@ Chicago	W 125–106	T. J. Warren (23)	Domantas Sabonis (10)	Domantas Sabonis (11)	United Center; 0	2–0
3	December 27	Boston	W 108–107	Malcolm Brogdon (25)	Domantas Sabonis (10)	T. J. McConnell (7)	Bankers Life Fieldhouse; 0	3–0
4	December 29	Boston	L 111–116	Victor Oladipo (24)	Domantas Sabonis (11)	Domantas Sabonis (8)	Bankers Life Fieldhouse; 0	3–1
5	December 31	Cleveland	W 119–99	Domantas Sabonis (25)	Domantas Sabonis (11)	Victor Oladipo (8)	Bankers Life Fieldhouse; 0	4–1

January: 7–8 (home: 3–5; road: 4–3)

Game	Date	Team	Score	High points	High rebounds	High assists	Location Attendance	Record
6	January 2	New York	L 102–106	Malcolm Brogdon (33)	Domantas Sabonis (13)	Malcolm Brogdon (7)	Bankers Life Fieldhouse; 0	4–2
7	January 4	@ New Orleans	W 118–116	Victor Oladipo (25)	Domantas Sabonis (11)	Malcolm Brogdon (11)	Smoothie King Center; 0	5–2
8	January 6	Houston	W 114–107	Malcolm Brogdon (35)	Domantas Sabonis (12)	Malcolm Brogdon (7)	Bankers Life Fieldhouse; 0	6–2
9	January 9	Phoenix	L 117–125	Domantas Sabonis (25)	Domantas Sabonis (22)	Malcolm Brogdon (9)	Bankers Life Fieldhouse; 0	6–3
10	January 11	@ Sacramento	L 122–127	Domantas Sabonis (28)	Domantas Sabonis (11)	Malcolm Brogdon (9)	Golden 1 Center; 0	6–4
11	January 12	@ Golden State	W 104–95	Myles Turner (22)	Domantas Sabonis (14)	Aaron Holiday (12)	Chase Center; 0	7–4
12	January 14	@ Portland	W 111–87	Malcolm Brogdon (25)	Domantas Sabonis (15)	T. J. McConnell (8)	Moda Center; 0	8–4
–	January 16	@ Phoenix	Postponed (COVID-19) (Makeup date: March 13)					
13	January 17	@ L.A. Clippers	L 96–129	Doug McDermott (23)	Domantas Sabonis (14)	Malcolm Brogdon (8)	Staples Center; 0	8–5
14	January 20	Dallas	L 112–124	Malcolm Brogdon (26)	Domantas Sabonis (10)	T. J. McConnell (6)	Bankers Life Fieldhouse; 0	8–6
15	January 22	Orlando	W 120–118	Malcolm Brogdon (23)	Domantas Sabonis (11)	Domantas Sabonis (9)	Bankers Life Fieldhouse; 0	9–6
16	January 24	Toronto	L 102–107	Myles Turner (25)	Domantas Sabonis (19)	T. J. McConnell (7)	Bankers Life Fieldhouse; 0	9–7
17	January 25	Toronto	W 129–114	Malcolm Brogdon (36)	Myles Turner (9)	Brogdon, McConnell (9)	Bankers Life Fieldhouse; 0	10–7
18	January 27	@ Charlotte	W 116–106	Doug McDermott (28)	Domantas Sabonis (11)	Domantas Sabonis (10)	Spectrum Center; 0	11–7
19	January 29	@ Charlotte	L 105–108	Domantas Sabonis (22)	Domantas Sabonis (11)	Malcolm Brogdon (8)	Spectrum Center; 0	11–8
20	January 31	Philadelphia	L 110–119	Malcolm Brogdon (25)	Domantas Sabonis (8)	T. J. McConnell (8)	Bankers Life Fieldhouse; 0	11–9

February: 4–8 (home: 1–4; road: 3–4)

Game	Date	Team	Score	High points	High rebounds	High assists	Location Attendance	Record
21	February 2	Memphis	W 134–116	Domantas Sabonis (32)	Domantas Sabonis (13)	Brogdon, McConnell (8)	Bankers Life Fieldhouse; 0	12–9
22	February 3	@ Milwaukee	L 110–130	Domantas Sabonis (33)	Domantas Sabonis (12)	T. J. McConnell (12)	Fiserv Forum; 0	12–10
23	February 5	New Orleans	L 113–114	Justin Holiday (22)	J. Holiday, Lamb, McDermott, Sabonis, Turner (6)	T. J. McConnell (15)	Bankers Life Fieldhouse; 0	12–11
24	February 7	Utah	L 95–103	Domantas Sabonis (20)	Domantas Sabonis (9)	Malcolm Brogdon (7)	Bankers Life Fieldhouse; 0	12–12
25	February 10	@ Brooklyn	L 94–104	Domantas Sabonis (18)	Domantas Sabonis (9)	Malcolm Brogdon (6)	Barclays Center; 0	12–13
26	February 11	@ Detroit	W 111–95	Domantas Sabonis (26)	Malcolm Brogdon (9)	Domantas Sabonis (8)	Little Caesars Arena; 0	13–13
27	February 13	@ Atlanta	W 125–113	Doug McDermott (26)	Domantas Sabonis (13)	T. J. McConnell (12)	State Farm Arena; 1,393	14–13
28	February 15	Chicago	L 112–120 (OT)	Domantas Sabonis (25)	Malcolm Brogdon (15)	Domantas Sabonis (5)	Bankers Life Fieldhouse; 0	14–14
29	February 17	@ Minnesota	W 134–128	Domantas Sabonis (36)	Domantas Sabonis (17)	Domantas Sabonis (10)	Target Center; 0	15–14
–	February 20	@ Houston	Postponed (winter storm) (Makeup date: April 14)					
–	February 22	San Antonio	Postponed (COVID-19) (Makeup date: April 19)					
30	February 24	Golden State	L 107–111	Malcolm Brogdon (24)	Domantas Sabonis (16)	T. J. McConnell (6)	Bankers Life Fieldhouse; 0	15–15
31	February 26	@ Boston	L 112–118	Domantas Sabonis (24)	Myles Turner (10)	Domantas Sabonis (9)	TD Garden; 0	15–16
32	February 27	@ New York	L 107–110	Doug McDermott (20)	Domantas Sabonis (7)	T. J. McConnell (12)	Madison Square Garden; 1,981	15–17

March: 6–8 (home: 1–3; road: 5–5)

Game	Date	Team	Score	High points	High rebounds	High assists	Location Attendance	Record
33	March 1	@ Philadelphia	L 114–130	Malcolm Brogdon (20)	Domantas Sabonis (9)	Domantas Sabonis (7)	Wells Fargo Center; 0	15–18
34	March 3	@ Cleveland	W 114–111	Malcolm Brogdon (29)	Domantas Sabonis (5)	T. J. McConnell (13)	Rocket Mortgage FieldHouse; 2,720	16–18
35	March 4	Denver	L 103–113	Myles Turner (22)	Myles Turner (12)	Domantas Sabonis (10)	Bankers Life Fieldhouse; 0	16–19
36	March 12	@ L.A. Lakers	L 100–105	Malcolm Brogdon (29)	Domantas Sabonis (14)	Domantas Sabonis (8)	Staples Center; 0	16–20
37	March 13	@ Phoenix	W 122–111	Malcolm Brogdon (25)	Domantas Sabonis (13)	Domantas Sabonis (10)	Phoenix Suns Arena; 3,166	17–20
38	March 15	@ Denver	L 106–121	Malcolm Brogdon (24)	Sabonis, Turner (9)	Domantas Sabonis (10)	Ball Arena; 0	17–21
39	March 17	Brooklyn	L 115–124	Malcolm Brogdon (24)	Domantas Sabonis (11)	Domantas Sabonis (11)	Bankers Life Fieldhouse; 0	17–22
40	March 19	@ Miami	W 137–110	Malcolm Brogdon (27)	Domantas Sabonis (15)	T. J. McConnell (15)	American Airlines Arena; 0	18–22
41	March 21	@ Miami	W 109–106	Domantas Sabonis (17)	Domantas Sabonis (11)	Malcolm Brogdon (10)	American Airlines Arena; 0	19–22
42	March 22	@ Milwaukee	L 113–140	Domantas Sabonis (22)	Domantas Sabonis (9)	T. J. McConnell (7)	Fiserv Forum; 3,280	19–23
43	March 24	Detroit	W 116–111	Caris LeVert (28)	Domantas Sabonis (11)	T. J. McConnell (5)	Bankers Life Fieldhouse; 0	20–23
44	March 26	@ Dallas	W 109–94	Brogdon, Sabonis (22)	Domantas Sabonis (15)	Domantas Sabonis (5)	American Airlines Center; 4,132	21–23
45	March 29	@ Washington	L 124–132	Domantas Sabonis (35)	Domantas Sabonis (11)	T. J. McConnell (9)	Capital One Arena; 0	21–24
46	March 31	Miami	L 87–92	Myles Turner (15)	Domantas Sabonis (14)	Caris LeVert (6)	Bankers Life Fieldhouse; 0	21–25

April: 8–8 (home: 3–6; road: 5–2)

Game	Date	Team	Score	High points	High rebounds	High assists	Location Attendance	Record
47	April 2	Charlotte	L 97–114	Caris LeVert (16)	Domantas Sabonis (10)	T. J. McConnell (7)	Bankers Life Fieldhouse; 0	21–26
48	April 3	@ San Antonio	W 139–133	Caris LeVert (26)	Bitadze, Turner (7)	Caris LeVert (9)	AT&T Center; 3,276	22–26
49	April 6	Chicago	L 97–113	Caris LeVert (10)	Lamb, LeVert (6)	Goga Bitadze (6)	Bankers Life Fieldhouse; 0	22–27
50	April 7	Minnesota	W 141–137	Aaron Holiday (22)	Kelan Martin (6)	T. J. McConnell (15)	Bankers Life Fieldhouse; 0	23–27
51	April 9	@ Orlando	W 111–106	Aaron Holiday (20)	Domantas Sabonis (15)	T. J. McConnell (9)	Amway Center; 3,777	24–27
52	April 11	@ Memphis	W 132–125	Caris LeVert (34)	Malcolm Brogdon (29)	Domantas Sabonis (18)	FedEx Forum; 0	25–27
53	April 13	L.A. Clippers	L 115–126	Malcolm Brogdon (29)	Caris LeVert (26)	Domantas Sabonis (20)	Bankers Life Fieldhouse; 0	25–28
54	April 14	@ Houston	W 132–124	Caris LeVert (27)	Malcolm Brogdon (14)	Malcolm Brogdon (9)	Toyota Center; 3,293	26–28
55	April 16	@ Utah	L 111–119	Caris LeVert (24)	Domantas Sabonis (15)	T. J. McConnell (8)	Vivint Arena; 5,546	26–29
56	April 18	@ Atlanta	L 117–129	Malcolm Brogdon (29)	Domantas Sabonis (14)	Malcolm Brogdon (8)	State Farm Arena; 0	26–30
57	April 19	San Antonio	L 94–109	Brogdon, LeVert (18)	Goga Bitadze (9)	Edmond Sumner (6)	Bankers Life Fieldhouse; 0	26–31
58	April 21	Oklahoma City	W 122–116	Malcolm Brogdon (29)	Malcolm Brogdon (15)	T. J. McConnell (8)	Bankers Life Fieldhouse; 0	27–31
59	April 24	Detroit	W 115–109	Malcolm Brogdon (26)	Oshae Brissett (11)	T. J. McConnell (13)	Bankers Life Fieldhouse; 0	28–31
60	April 25	@ Orlando	W 131–112	Malcolm Brogdon (24)	Brissett, Brogdon (8)	Malcolm Brogdon (9)	Amway Center; 3,519	29–31
61	April 27	Portland	L 112–133	Brissett, Brogdon (18)	Oshae Brissett (10)	T. J. McConnell (6)	Bankers Life Fieldhouse; 0	29–32
62	April 29	Brooklyn	L 113–130	Caris LeVert (36)	Oshae Brissett (9)	LeVert, McConnell (5)	Bankers Life Fieldhouse; 0	29–33

May: 5–5 (home: 2–4; road: 3–1)

Game	Date	Team	Score	High points	High rebounds	High assists	Location Attendance	Record
63	May 1	@ Oklahoma City	W 152–95	Doug McDermott (31)	Domantas Sabonis (19)	Domantas Sabonis (14)	Chesapeake Energy Arena; 0	30–33
64	May 3	@ Washington	L 141–154	Caris LeVert (33)	Domantas Sabonis (32)	Justin Holiday (15)	Capital One Arena; 0	30–34
65	May 5	Sacramento	L 93–104	Caris LeVert (14)	Domantas Sabonis (10)	Domantas Sabonis (13)	Bankers Life Fieldhouse; 0	30–35
66	May 6	Atlanta	W 133–126	Domantas Sabonis (30)	Brissett, Sabonis (8)	Caris LeVert (12)	Bankers Life Fieldhouse; 0	31–35
67	May 8	Washington	L 132–133	Caris LeVert (35)	Caris LeVert (14)	Domantas Sabonis (13)	Bankers Life Fieldhouse; 0	31–36
68	May 11	@ Cleveland	W 111–102	Kelan Martin (25)	Domantas Sabonis (20)	Caris LeVert (10)	Rocket Mortgage FieldHouse; 4,148	32–36
69	May 12	Philadelphia	W 103–94	Caris LeVert (24)	Domantas Sabonis (13)	Domantas Sabonis (15)	Bankers Life Fieldhouse; 0	33–36
70	May 14	Milwaukee	L 133–142	Justin Holiday (26)	Kelan Martin (9)	Domantas Sabonis (14)	Bankers Life Fieldhouse; 0	33–37
71	May 15	L.A. Lakers	L 115–122	Caris LeVert (28)	Goga Bitadze (7)	Caris LeVert (12)	Bankers Life Fieldhouse; 0	33–38
72	May 16	@ Toronto	W 125–113	Oshae Brissett (31)	Domantas Sabonis (16)	T. J. McConnell (17)	Amalie Arena; 0	34–38

2020–21 season schedule

=== Play-in ===
2021 play-in game log
Total: 1–1 (Home: 1–0; Road: 0–1)
Play-in: 1–1 (home: 1–0; road: 0–1)

Game	Date	Team	Score	High points	High rebounds	High assists	Location Attendance	Record
1	May 19	Charlotte	W 144–117	Oshae Brissett (23)	Domantas Sabonis (21)	Domantas Sabonis (9)	Bankers Life Fieldhouse; 0	1–0
2	May 21	@ Washington	L 115–142	Malcolm Brogdon (24)	Domantas Sabonis (11)	Domantas Sabonis (10)	Capital One Arena; 0	1–1

== Player statistics ==
=== Regular season ===
Player	POS	GP	GS	MP	REB	AST	STL	BLK	PTS	MPG	RPG	APG	SPG	BPG	PPG
Justin Holiday	SG	72	52	2,183	256	119	74	41	756	30.3	3.6	1.7	1.0	.6	10.5
T. J. McConnell	PG	69	3	1,796	256	456	128	23	596	26.0	3.7	6.6	1.9	.3	8.6
Doug McDermott	PF	66	29	1,619	221	85	20	6	899	24.5	3.3	1.3	.3	.1	13.6
Aaron Holiday	PG	66	8	1,176	89	123	46	13	475	17.8	1.3	1.9	.7	.2	7.2
Domantas Sabonis	PF	62	62	2,231	742	415	76	33	1,260	36.0	12.0	6.7	1.2	.5	20.3
Malcolm Brogdon	PG	56	56	1,930	294	329	49	15	1,186	34.5	5.3	5.9	.9	.3	21.2
Edmond Sumner	SG	53	24	861	94	49	33	10	399	16.2	1.8	.9	.6	.2	7.5
Myles Turner	C	47	47	1,455	306	48	40	159	592	31.0	6.5	1.0	.9	3.4	12.6
Goga Bitadze	C	45	3	561	150	37	9	60	231	12.5	3.3	.8	.2	1.3	5.1
Jeremy Lamb	SG	36	8	765	131	53	34	23	363	21.3	3.6	1.5	.9	.6	10.1
Caris LeVert^{†}	SG	35	35	1,152	162	173	53	24	726	32.9	4.6	4.9	1.5	.7	20.7
Kelan Martin	SF	35	0	322	78	17	10	10	157	9.2	2.2	.5	.3	.3	4.5
JaKarr Sampson	PF	29	4	316	77	4	2	14	134	10.9	2.7	.1	.1	.5	4.6
Cassius Stanley	SG	24	0	93	20	1	1	2	36	3.9	.8	.0	.0	.1	1.5
Oshae Brissett	SF	21	16	519	115	18	19	20	229	24.7	5.5	.9	.9	1.0	10.9
Victor Oladipo^{†}	SG	9	9	300	51	38	15	2	180	33.3	5.7	4.2	1.7	.2	20.0
Brian Bowen	SF	6	0	15	3	0	0	0	3	2.5	.5	.0	.0	.0	.5
Amida Brimah	C	5	0	29	8	1	0	5	13	5.8	1.6	.2	.0	1.0	2.6
T. J. Warren	SF	4	4	117	14	5	2	0	62	29.3	3.5	1.3	.5	.0	15.5
Jalen Lecque	PG	4	0	12	5	2	0	0	5	3.0	1.3	.5	.0	.0	1.3

- ^{†} Denotes player spent time with another team in the season. Stats reflect time with the Pacers only.

== Transactions ==
=== Trades ===
November 25, 2020	To Indiana Pacers Jalen Lecque	To Oklahoma City Thunder T. J. Leaf; 2027 second-round pick
January 13, 2021 (Four-team trade)	To Indiana Pacers Caris LeVert (from Brooklyn); 2023 second-round pick (from Houston) (Jalen Pickett); 2024 second-round pick (from Cleveland) (Tristen Newton)	To Brooklyn Nets James Harden (from Houston)
January 13, 2021 (Four-team trade)	To Houston Rockets Victor Oladipo (from Indiana); Dante Exum (from Cleveland); Rodions Kurucs (from Brooklyn); 2022 first-round pick (from Brooklyn via Milwaukee) (MarJon Beauchamp); 2022 first-round pick (from Brooklyn) (Tari Eason); 2024 first-round pick (from Brooklyn) (Reed Sheppard); 2026 first-round pick (from Brooklyn)	To Cleveland Cavaliers Jarrett Allen (from Brooklyn); Taurean Prince (from Brooklyn); Draft rights to Sasha Vezenkov (from Brooklyn) (2017, Pick 57)

=== Free agents ===
==== Additions ====
Player	Date Signed	Contract	Former Team	Ref.
Rayshaun Hammonds	November 19, 2020 (Note: Hammonds signed a second Exhibit 10 contract on November 29.)	Exhibit 10 contract	Georgia	
Amida Brimah	November 29, 2020 (Note: Brimah was officially waived by the team on December 18. However, he re-signed with the Pacers to a two-way contract on April 23.)	Exhibit 10 contract	Austin Spurs	
Kelan Martin	November 29, 2020	2 year, $3.1 million contract	Minnesota Timberwolves	
Devin Robinson	December 18, 2020	Exhibit 10 contract	Raptors 905	
Josh Gray	December 18, 2020	Exhibit 10 contract	Oklahoma City Thunder (Note: Gray played with the New Orleans Pelicans through the 2019–20 season, and was officially traded to the Oklahoma City Thunder on November 24, 2020, but waived later in December 1.)	
Oshae Brissett	April 1, 2021 (Note: Brissett signed a second 10-day contract on April 11, and eventually signed a 2 year, $2.4 million contract with the Pacers on April 21.)	10-day contract	Fort Wayne Mad Ants	

==== Subtractions ====
Player	Reason Left	Date Left	New Team	Ref.
Rayshaun Hammonds	Waived	December 18, 2020	Fort Wayne Mad Ants	
Devin Robinson	Waived	December 19, 2020	Fort Wayne Mad Ants	
Josh Gray	Waived	December 19, 2020	Fort Wayne Mad Ants	
Naz Mitrou-Long	Waived	December 19, 2020	Fort Wayne Mad Ants	
Jalen Lecque	Waived	March 25, 2021	Wisconsin Herd	
Brian Bowen	Waived	April 23, 2021	Minnesota Timberwolves	
