= 2020–21 Denver Nuggets season =

NBA professional basketball team season

- Head coach: Michael Malone
- President: Tim Connelly
- General manager: Calvin Booth
- Owners: Ann Walton Kroenke
- Arena: Ball Arena

Results
- Record: 47–25 (.653)
- Place: Division: 2nd (Northwest); Conference: 3rd (Western)
- Playoff finish: Conference semifinals (lost to Suns 0–4)
- Stats at Basketball Reference

Local media
- Television: Altitude Sports and Entertainment
- Radio: KKSE

The 2020–21 Denver Nuggets season was the 45th season of the franchise in the National Basketball Association (NBA), and the franchise's 54th season of existence overall.

On May 3, the Nuggets officially clinched a playoff spot for the third consecutive season. In the First Round, the Nuggets defeated the Portland Trail Blazers in six games, before getting swept in the conference semi-Finals by the eventual Western Conference champion Phoenix Suns.

Nikola Jokić was voted league MVP for the regular season, thereby becoming the first player in franchise history to win the award.

Jamal Murray was setting career-highs in points and FG% until tearing the ACL in his left knee in April. Following surgery on April 21st, he missed the entire 2021–22 season and would not return until October 2022.

Michael Porter Jr. broke out with more playing time in his second year removed from his second back surgery. He scored 19.0 points per game in an increased 31.3 minutes a night, shooting 44.5% from three.

A March 2021 trade for Magic forward Aaron Gordon in return for long-time Nugget Gary Harris completed the core of Jokić, Murray, Porter Jr., and Gordon that eventually won the NBA Finals in 2023.

== Draft ==
Round	Pick	Player	Position	Nationality	School / club team
1	22	Zeke Nnaji	PF/C	United States	Arizona

== Roster ==
2020–21 Denver Nuggets roster
Players

Pos.	No.	Player	Height	Weight	DOB	From
G	5	Will Barton	6 ft 6 in (1.98 m)	181 lb (82 kg)	1991-01-06	Memphis
F/C	10	Bol Bol	7 ft 2 in (2.18 m)	220 lb (100 kg)	1999-11-16	Oregon
G	7	Facundo Campazzo	5 ft 10 in (1.78 m)	195 lb (88 kg)	1991-03-23	Argentina
F	31	Vlatko Čančar	6 ft 8 in (2.03 m)	236 lb (107 kg)	1997-04-10	Slovenia
G	35	PJ Dozier	6 ft 6 in (1.98 m)	205 lb (93 kg)	1996-10-25	South Carolina
F	50	Aaron Gordon	6 ft 9 in (2.06 m)	235 lb (107 kg)	1995-09-16	Arizona
F	0	JaMychal Green	6 ft 8 in (2.03 m)	227 lb (103 kg)	1990-06-21	Alabama
G	3	Shaquille Harrison (TW)	6 ft 7 in (2.01 m)	190 lb (86 kg)	1993-10-06	Tulsa
G	00	Markus Howard (TW)	5 ft 10 in (1.78 m)	175 lb (79 kg)	1999-03-03	Marquette
C	15	Nikola Jokić	7 ft 0 in (2.13 m)	284 lb (129 kg)	1995-02-19	Serbia
C	34	JaVale McGee	7 ft 0 in (2.13 m)	270 lb (122 kg)	1988-01-19	Nevada
F	4	Paul Millsap	6 ft 8 in (2.03 m)	257 lb (117 kg)	1985-02-10	Louisiana Tech
G	11	Monté Morris	6 ft 2 in (1.88 m)	183 lb (83 kg)	1995-06-27	Iowa State
G	27	Jamal Murray	6 ft 3 in (1.91 m)	215 lb (98 kg)	1997-02-23	Kentucky
F/C	22	Zeke Nnaji	6 ft 11 in (2.11 m)	240 lb (109 kg)	2001-01-09	Arizona
F	1	Michael Porter	6 ft 10 in (2.08 m)	218 lb (99 kg)	1998-06-29	Missouri
G	25	Austin Rivers	6 ft 4 in (1.93 m)	200 lb (91 kg)	1992-08-01	Duke

Coaches
Head coach
- Michael Malone
Assistant(s)
- David Adelman
- John Beckett
- Ryan Bowen
- Jordi Fernández
- Charles Klask
- Ognjen Stojaković
- Wes Unseld Jr. (associate HC)
- Elvis Valcarcel

Legend
- (DP) Unsigned draft pick
- (FA) Free agent
- (S) Suspended
- (GL) On assignment to G League
- (TW) Two-way affiliate player
- Injured

Roster
Updated: April 30, 2021

== Standings ==
=== Division ===
Northwest Division	W	L	PCT	GB	Home	Road	Div	GP
z – Utah Jazz	52	20	.722	–	31‍–‍5	21‍–‍15	7–5	72
x – Denver Nuggets	47	25	.653	5.0	25‍–‍11	22‍–‍14	9–3	72
x – Portland Trail Blazers	42	30	.583	10.0	20‍–‍16	22‍–‍14	6–6	72
Minnesota Timberwolves	23	49	.319	29.0	13‍–‍23	10‍–‍26	5–7	72
Oklahoma City Thunder	22	50	.306	30.0	10‍–‍26	12‍–‍24	3–9	72

=== Conference ===
Western Conference
#	Team	W	L	PCT	GB	GP
1	z – Utah Jazz *	52	20	.722	–	72
2	y – Phoenix Suns *	51	21	.708	1.0	72
3	x – Denver Nuggets	47	25	.653	5.0	72
4	x – Los Angeles Clippers	47	25	.653	5.0	72
5	y – Dallas Mavericks *	42	30	.583	10.0	72
6	x – Portland Trail Blazers	42	30	.583	10.0	72
7	x – Los Angeles Lakers	42	30	.583	10.0	72
8	pi – Golden State Warriors	39	33	.542	13.0	72
9	x – Memphis Grizzlies	38	34	.528	14.0	72
10	pi – San Antonio Spurs	33	39	.458	19.0	72
11	New Orleans Pelicans	31	41	.431	21.0	72
12	Sacramento Kings	31	41	.431	21.0	72
13	Minnesota Timberwolves	23	49	.319	29.0	72
14	Oklahoma City Thunder	22	50	.306	30.0	72
15	Houston Rockets	17	55	.236	35.0	72

Notes

- z – Clinched home court advantage for the entire playoffs
- c – Clinched home court advantage for the conference playoffs
- y – Clinched division title
- x – Clinched playoff spot
- pb – Clinched play-in spot
- o – Eliminated from playoff contention
- * – Division leader

== Game log ==
=== Preseason ===
2020 preseason game log
Total: 2–1 (home: 2–0; road: 0–1)
Preseason: 2–1 (home: 2–0; road: 0–1)

Game	Date	Team	Score	High points	High rebounds	High assists	Location Attendance	Record
1	December 12	@ Golden State	L 105–107	Nikola Jokić (26)	Nikola Jokić (10)	Nikola Jokić (5)	Chase Center; 0	0–1
2	December 16	Portland	W 126–95	Nikola Jokić (16)	Nikola Jokić (11)	Nikola Jokić (8)	Ball Arena; 0	1–1
3	December 18	Portland	W 129–96	Paul Millsap (24)	Michael Porter Jr. (9)	Nikola Jokić (6)	Ball Arena; 0	2–1

2020–21 preseason schedule

=== Regular season ===
2020–21 game log
Total: 47–25 (home: 25–11; road: 22–14)
December: 1–3 (home: 1–2; road: 0–1)

Game	Date	Team	Score	High points	High rebounds	High assists	Location Attendance	Record
1	December 23	Sacramento	L 122–124 (OT)	Nikola Jokić (29)	Nikola Jokić (15)	Nikola Jokić (14)	Ball Arena; 0	0–1
2	December 25	L. A. Clippers	L 108–121	Nikola Jokić (24)	Nikola Jokić (9)	Nikola Jokić (10)	Ball Arena; 0	0–2
3	December 28	Houston	W 124–111	Jamal Murray (21)	Nikola Jokić (12)	Nikola Jokić (18)	Ball Arena; 0	1–2
4	December 29	@ Sacramento	L 115–125	Michael Porter Jr. (30)	Nikola Jokić (11)	Nikola Jokić (12)	Golden 1 Center; 0	1–3

January: 11–5 (home: 4–3; road: 7–2)

Game	Date	Team	Score	High points	High rebounds	High assists	Location Attendance	Record
5	January 1	Phoenix	L 103–106	Jamal Murray (31)	Nikola Jokić (9)	Nikola Jokić (11)	Ball Arena; 0	1–4
6	January 3	@ Minnesota	W 124–109	Jamal Murray (36)	Nikola Jokić (12)	Nikola Jokić (12)	Target Center; 0	2–4
7	January 5	Minnesota	W 123–116	Nikola Jokić (35)	Nikola Jokić (15)	Nikola Jokić (6)	Ball Arena; 0	3–4
8	January 7	Dallas	L 117–124 (OT)	Nikola Jokić (38)	Nikola Jokić (11)	Jamal Murray (9)	Ball Arena; 0	3–5
9	January 9	@ Philadelphia	W 115–103	Gary Harris (21)	Nikola Jokić (9)	Nikola Jokić (12)	Wells Fargo Center; 0	4–5
10	January 10	@ New York	W 114–89	Nikola Jokić (22)	Nikola Jokić (10)	Nikola Jokić (5)	Madison Square Garden; 0	5–5
11	January 12	@ Brooklyn	L 116–122	Nikola Jokić (23)	Nikola Jokić (8)	Nikola Jokić (11)	Barclays Center; 0	5–6
12	January 14	Golden State	W 114–104	Nikola Jokić (23)	Nikola Jokić (14)	Nikola Jokić (10)	Ball Arena; 0	6–6
13	January 17	Utah	L 105–109	Nikola Jokić (35)	Nikola Jokić (14)	Nikola Jokić (9)	Ball Arena; 0	6–7
14	January 19	Oklahoma City	W 119–101	Nikola Jokić (27)	Jokić & Millsap (12)	Barton & Jokić (6)	Ball Arena; 0	7–7
15	January 22	@ Phoenix	W 130–126 (OT)	Nikola Jokić (31)	Nikola Jokić (10)	Jamal Murray (9)	Mortgage Matchup Center; 0	8–7
16	January 23	@ Phoenix	W 120–112 (2OT)	Nikola Jokić (29)	Nikola Jokić (22)	Nikola Jokić (6)	Mortgage Matchup Center; 0	9–7
17	January 25	@ Dallas	W 117–113	Michael Porter Jr. (30)	Nikola Jokić (10)	Monté Morris (6)	American Airlines Center; 0	10–7
18	January 27	@ Miami	W 109–82	Nikola Jokić (21)	Nikola Jokić (11)	Gary Harris (7)	American Airlines Arena; 0	11–7
19	January 29	@ San Antonio	L 109–119	Nikola Jokić (35)	Nikola Jokić (10)	Jamal Murray (7)	AT&T Center; 0	11–8
20	January 31	Utah	W 128–117	Nikola Jokić (47)	Nikola Jokić (11)	Will Barton (6)	Ball Arena; 0	12–8

February: 6–7 (home: 4–2; road: 2–5)

Game	Date	Team	Score	High points	High rebounds	High assists	Location Attendance	Record
—	February 1	Detroit	Postponed (makeup date April 6)					
21	February 4	@ L. A. Lakers	L 93–114	Jamal Murray (20)	Jokić & Millsap (10)	Nikola Jokić (6)	Staples Center; 0	12–9
22	February 6	@ Sacramento	L 114–119	Nikola Jokić (50)	R. J. Hampton (10)	Nikola Jokić (12)	Golden 1 Center; 0	12–10
23	February 8	Milwaukee	L 112–125	Nikola Jokić (35)	Nikola Jokić (12)	Nikola Jokić (6)	Ball Arena; 0	12–11
24	February 10	Cleveland	W 133–95	Paul Millsap (22)	Jokić & Green (6)	Nikola Jokić (12)	Ball Arena; 0	13–11
25	February 12	Oklahoma City	W 97–95	Jokić, Murray (22)	Nikola Jokić (13)	Nikola Jokić (9)	Ball Arena; 0	14–11
26	February 14	L. A. Lakers	W 122–105	Jamal Murray (25)	Nikola Jokić (16)	Nikola Jokić (10)	Ball Arena; 0	15–11
27	February 16	@ Boston	L 99–122	Nikola Jokic (43)	Michael Porter Jr. (7)	Facundo Campazzo (8)	TD Garden; 0	15–12
28	February 17	@ Washington	L 128–130	Jamal Murray (35)	JaMychal Green (10)	Nikola Jokic (9)	Capital One Arena; 0	15–13
—	February 19	@ Charlotte	Postponed (makeup date May 11)					
29	February 19	@ Cleveland	W 120–103	Jamal Murray (50)	Nikola Jokic (12)	Nikola Jokic (10)	Rocket Mortgage FieldHouse; 2,720	16–13
30	February 21	@ Atlanta	L 115–123	Jamal Murray (30)	Nikola Jokic (10)	Nikola Jokic (6)	State Farm Arena; 1,362	16–14
31	February 23	Portland	W 111–106	Nikola Jokic (41)	Michael Porter Jr (10)	Jamal Murray (8)	Ball Arena; 0	17–14
32	February 25	Washington	L 110–112	Jamal Murray (34)	Nikola Jokic (11)	Nikola Jokic (7)	Ball Arena; 0	17–15
33	February 27	@ Oklahoma City	W 126–96	Jamal Murray (26)	Nikola Jokic (11)	Nikola Jokic (13)	Chesapeake Energy Arena; 0	18–15

March: 11–3 (home: 5–2; road: 6–1)

Game	Date	Team	Score	High points	High rebounds	High assists	Location Attendance	Record
34	March 1	@ Chicago	W 118–112	Nikola Jokic (39)	Michael Porter Jr (15)	Nikola Jokic (9)	United Center; 0	19–15
35	March 2	@ Milwaukee	W 128–97	Nikola Jokic (37)	Nikola Jokic (10)	Nikola Jokic (11)	Fiserv Forum; 1,800	20–15
36	March 4	@ Indiana	W 113–103	Michael Porter Jr. (24)	Nikola Jokic (12)	Jokic & Dozier (8)	Bankers Life Fieldhouse; 0	21–15
All-Star Break
37	March 12	@ Memphis	W 103–102	Nikola Jokic (28)	Nikola Jokic (15)	Nikola Jokic (7)	FedExForum; 2,160	22–15
38	March 13	Dallas	L 103–116	Nikola Jokic (26)	Nikola Jokic (9)	Nikola Jokic (11)	Ball Arena; 0	22–16
39	March 15	Indiana	W 121–106	Nikola Jokic (32)	Nikola Jokic (14)	Jamal Murray (8)	Ball Arena; 0	23–16
40	March 17	Charlotte	W 129–104	Michael Porter Jr. (28)	Michael Porter Jr. (13)	Jokic & Campazzo (10)	Ball Arena; 0	24–16
41	March 19	Chicago	W 131–127 (OT)	Jokic & Murray (34)	Nikola Jokic (15)	Nikola Jokic (9)	Ball Arena; 0	25–16
42	March 21	New Orleans	L 108–113	Nikola Jokic (29)	Nikola Jokic (10)	Nikola Jokic (10)	Ball Arena; 0	25–17
43	March 23	@ Orlando	W 110–99	Nikola Jokic (28)	Nikola Jokic (15)	Nikola Jokic (10)	Amway Center; 3,485	26–17
44	March 24	@ Toronto	L 111–135	Jokic, Murray (20)	Nikola Jokic (10)	Paul Millsap (6)	Amalie Arena; 1,578	26–18
45	March 26	@ New Orleans	W 113–108	Nikola Jokic (37)	Paul Millsap (7)	Jamal Murray (11)	Smoothie King Center; 3,700	27–18
46	March 28	Atlanta	W 126–102	JaMychal Green (20)	Jokic, Porter Jr. (10)	Nikola Jokic (8)	Ball Arena; 0	28–18
47	March 30	Philadelphia	W 104–95	Jamal Murray (30)	Michael Porter Jr. (12)	Will Barton (6)	Ball Arena; 3,574	29–18

April: 13–3 (home: 10–1; road: 3–2)

Game	Date	Team	Score	High points	High rebounds	High assists	Location Attendance	Record
48	April 1	@ L. A. Clippers	W 101–94	Jamal Murray (23)	Jamal Murray (8)	Nikola Jokic (7)	Staples Center; 0	30–18
49	April 4	Orlando	W 119–109	Aaron Gordon (24)	Michael Porter Jr. (12)	Nikola Jokic (16)	Ball Arena; 3,927	31–18
50	April 6	Detroit	W 134–119	Nikola Jokic (27)	Nikola Jokic (8)	Nikola Jokic (11)	Ball Arena; 3,556	32–18
51	April 7	San Antonio	W 106–96	Nikola Jokic (25)	Michael Porter Jr. (10)	Nikola Jokic (10)	Ball Arena; 3,715	33–18
52	April 9	San Antonio	W 121–119	Nikola Jokic (26)	Nikola Jokic (13)	Nikola Jokic (14)	Ball Arena; 3,750	34–18
53	April 11	Boston	L 87–105	Michael Porter Jr. (22)	Michael Porter Jr. (11)	Nikola Jokic (11)	Ball Arena; 4,032	34–19
54	April 12	@ Golden State	L 107–116	Nikola Jokic (27)	Nikola Jokic (12)	Nikola Jokic (8)	Chase Center; 0	34–20
55	April 14	Miami	W 123–106	Michael Porter Jr. (25)	Jokic & Porter Jr. (10)	Nikola Jokic (11)	Ball Arena; 4,017	35–20
56	April 16	@ Houston	W 128–99	Nikola Jokic (29)	Nikola Jokic (16)	Nikola Jokic (7)	Toyota Center; 3,342	36–20
57	April 19	Memphis	W 139–137 (2OT)	Nikola Jokic (47)	Nikola Jokic (15)	Nikola Jokic (8)	Ball Arena; 4,005	37–20
58	April 21	@ Portland	W 106–105	Nikola Jokic (25)	Nikola Jokic (9)	Nikola Jokic (5)	Moda Center; 0	38–20
59	April 23	@ Golden State	L 97–118	Michael Porter Jr. (26)	Paul Millsap (7)	Nikola Jokic (6)	Chase Center; 1,935	38–21
60	April 24	Houston	W 129–116	Michael Porter Jr. (39)	Nikola Jokic (8)	Facundo Campazzo (13)	Ball Arena; 4,035	39–21
61	April 26	Memphis	W 120–96	Michael Porter Jr. (31)	Nikola Jokic (15)	Facundo Campazzo (7)	Ball Arena; 3,823	40–21
62	April 28	New Orleans	W 114–112	Nikola Jokic (32)	Michael Porter Jr. (8)	Facundo Campazzo (10)	Ball Arena; 4,022	41–21
63	April 29	Toronto	W 121–111	Michael Porter Jr. (23)	Nikola Jokic (11)	Campazzo & Gordon (4)	Ball Arena; 4,025	42–21

May: 5–4 (home: 1–1; road: 4–3)

Game	Date	Team	Score	High points	High rebounds	High assists	Location Attendance	Record
64	May 1	@ L. A. Clippers	W 110–104	Nikola Jokic (30)	Nikola Jokic (14)	Nikola Jokic (7)	Staples Center; 2,818	43–21
65	May 3	@ L. A. Lakers	L 89–93	Nikola Jokic (32)	Nikola Jokic (9)	Facundo Campazzo (8)	Staples Center; 2,454	43–22
66	May 5	New York	W 113–97	Nikola Jokic (32)	Nikola Jokic (12)	Nikola Jokic (6)	Ball Arena; 4,038	44–22
67	May 7	@ Utah	L 120–127	Michael Porter Jr. (31)	Nikola Jokic (9)	Nikola Jokic (13)	Vivint Arena; 6,506	44–23
68	May 8	Brooklyn	L 119–125	Nikola Jokic (29)	Nikola Jokic (7)	Nikola Jokic (6)	Ball Arena; 4,044	44–24
69	May 11	@ Charlotte	W 117–112	Jokic & Porter Jr. (30)	Nikola Jokic (11)	Campazzo & Jokic (6)	Spectrum Center; 3,997	45–24
70	May 13	@ Minnesota	W 114–103	Nikola Jokic (31)	Nikola Jokic (14)	Facundo Campazzo (9)	Target Center; 1,638	46–24
71	May 14	@ Detroit	W 104–91	Howard & Jokic (20)	Nikola Jokic (15)	Nikola Jokic (11)	Little Caesars Arena; 750	47–24
72	May 16	@ Portland	L 116–132	Markus Howard (23)	JaVale McGee (8)	Monté Morris (4)	Moda Center; 1,939	47–25

2020–21 season schedule

=== Playoffs ===
2021 playoff game log
Total: 4–6 (home: 2–3; road: 2–3)
First round: 4–2 (home: 2–1; road: 2–1)

Game	Date	Team	Score	High points	High rebounds	High assists	Location Attendance	Series
1	May 22	Portland	L 109–123	Nikola Jokić (34)	Nikola Jokić (16)	Campazzo, Morris (5)	Ball Arena; 7,732	0–1
2	May 24	Portland	W 128–109	Nikola Jokić (38)	Nikola Jokić (8)	Monté Morris (7)	Ball Arena; 7,727	1–1
3	May 27	@ Portland	W 120–115	Nikola Jokić (36)	Nikola Jokić (11)	Facundo Campazzo (8)	Moda Center; 8,050	2–1
4	May 29	@ Portland	L 95–115	Nikola Jokić (16)	Nikola Jokić (9)	Facundo Campazzo (7)	Moda Center; 8,050	2–2
5	June 1	Portland	W 147–140 (2OT)	Nikola Jokić (38)	Michael Porter Jr. (12)	Nikola Jokić (9)	Ball Arena; 10,463	3–2
6	June 3	@ Portland	W 126–115	Nikola Jokić (36)	JaMychal Green (9)	Monté Morris (9)	Moda Center; 10,022	4–2

Conference semifinals: 0–4 (home: 0–2; road: 0–2)

Game	Date	Team	Score	High points	High rebounds	High assists	Location Attendance	Series
1	June 7	@ Phoenix	L 105–122	Nikola Jokić (22)	JaMychal Green (11)	Campazzo, Morris (6)	Phoenix Suns Arena; 16,219	0–1
2	June 9	@ Phoenix	L 98–123	Nikola Jokić (24)	Nikola Jokić (13)	Nikola Jokić (6)	Phoenix Suns Arena; 16,529	0–2
3	June 11	Phoenix	L 102–116	Nikola Jokić (32)	Nikola Jokić (20)	Nikola Jokić (10)	Ball Arena; 18,277	0–3
4	June 13	Phoenix	L 118–125	Will Barton (25)	Nikola Jokić (11)	Monté Morris (6)	Ball Arena; 18,290	0–4

2021 playoff schedule

== Player statistics ==
Legend
GP	Games played	GS	Games started	MPG	Minutes per game
FG%	Field-goal percentage	3P%	3-point field-goal percentage	FT%	Free-throw percentage
RPG	Rebounds per game	APG	Assists per game	SPG	Steals per game
BPG	Blocks per game	PPG	Points per game

=== Regular season ===
Denver Nuggets statistics
Player	GP	GS	MPG	FG%	3P%	FT%	RPG	APG	SPG	BPG	PPG
Will Barton	56	52	31.0	.426	.381	.785	4.0	3.2	.9	.4	12.7
Bol Bol	32	2	5.0	.431	.375	.667	.8	.2	.1	.3	2.2
Facundo Campazzo	65	19	21.9	.381	.352	.879	2.1	3.6	1.2	.2	6.1
Vlatko Čančar	41	1	6.9	.458	.273	.769	1.2	.3	.3	.0	2.1
Gary Clark	2	0	2.0	.000	.000	.000	.5	.0	.0	.0	.0
PJ Dozier	50	6	21.8	.417	.315	.636	3.6	1.8	.6	.4	7.7
Aaron Gordon	25	25	25.9	.500	.266	.705	4.7	2.2	.7	.6	10.2
JaMychal Green	58	5	19.3	.463	.399	.807	4.8	.9	.4	.4	8.1
R. J. Hampton	25	0	9.3	.417	.278	.750	2.0	.6	.2	.1	2.6
Gary Harris	19	19	30.6	.442	.320	.733	2.5	1.7	.9	.2	9.7
Shaquille Harrison	17	0	16.3	.345	.214	.813	2.3	.9	.9	.3	3.3
Isaiah Hartenstein	30	0	9.1	.513	.000	.611	2.8	.5	.4	.7	3.5
Markus Howard	37	1	5.5	.377	.277	.778	.6	.5	.1	.0	2.8
Nikola Jokić	72	72	34.6	.566	.388	.868	10.8	8.3	1.3	.7	26.4
JaVale McGee	13	1	13.5	.478	.000	.667	5.3	.5	.2	1.1	5.5
Paul Millsap	56	36	20.8	.476	.343	.724	4.7	1.8	.9	.6	9.0
Monté Morris	47	13	25.5	.481	.381	.795	2.0	3.2	.7	.3	10.2
Jamal Murray	48	48	35.5	.477	.408	.869	4.0	4.8	1.3	.3	21.2
Zeke Nnaji	42	1	9.5	.481	.407	.800	1.5	.2	.2	.1	3.2
Michael Porter	61	54	31.3	.542	.445	.791	7.3	1.1	.7	.9	19.0
Austin Rivers	15	5	26.9	.418	.375	.706	2.3	2.6	1.2	.1	8.7
Greg Whittington	4	0	3.0	.000	.000	.000	.0	.0	.0	.0	.0

=== Playoffs ===
Denver Nuggets statistics
Player	GP	GS	MPG	FG%	3P%	FT%	RPG	APG	SPG	BPG	PPG
Will Barton	3	1	27.7	.442	.333	1.000	4.3	2.7	.7	.3	16.3
Bol Bol	3	0	2.0	.000	.000	.000	.3	.7	.0	.0	.0
Facundo Campazzo	10	9	27.0	.392	.396	.842	3.0	4.1	1.4	.4	9.3
Vlatko Čančar	5	0	4.2	1.000	1.000	.800	.6	.2	.2	.2	2.2
Aaron Gordon	10	10	29.9	.434	.391	.640	5.4	2.0	.5	.3	11.1
JaMychal Green	10	0	19.0	.444	.300	.889	5.2	1.1	.2	.2	5.4
Shaquille Harrison	9	0	4.4	.750	1.000	.667	.9	.3	.3	.3	1.0
Markus Howard	9	0	12.4	.405	.423	.500	.8	.4	.0	.1	4.7
Nikola Jokić	10	10	34.5	.509	.377	.836	11.6	5.0	.6	.9	29.8
JaVale McGee	4	0	8.5	.300	.000	.333	3.0	.8	.3	1.3	2.0
Paul Millsap	9	0	12.1	.440	.261	.615	3.9	1.7	.3	.7	6.4
Monté Morris	10	1	28.6	.431	.400	.724	2.4	5.5	1.0	.2	13.7
Zeke Nnaji	5	0	3.6	.500	.429	.500	.4	.4	.2	.0	2.4
Michael Porter	10	10	33.2	.474	.397	.810	6.2	1.3	1.1	.3	17.4
Austin Rivers	10	9	30.5	.435	.413	.813	1.7	2.1	.2	.3	9.2

== Transactions ==
=== Overview ===
Players Added

Via draft

- Zeke Nnaji

Via free agency

- Greg Whittington
- Isaiah Hartenstein
- Markus Howard
- Facundo Campazzo
- JaMychal Green
- Shaquille Harrison
- Austin Rivers

Via trade

- R. J. Hampton
- JaVale McGee
- Aaron Gordon
- Gary Clark
Players Lost

Via free agency

- Jerami Grant
- Torrey Craig
- Noah Vonleh
- Mason Plumlee
- Troy Daniels
- Tyler Cook

Via trade

- Gary Harris
- R. J. Hampton
- Isaiah Hartenstein

Waived

- Keita Bates-Diop
- Greg Whittington
- Gary Clark

=== Trades ===
November 22, 2020
To Denver Nuggets

Cash considerations

To Detroit Pistons

Jerami Grant (Sign and trade)
Rights to Nikola Radičević (2015 #57)

November 24, 2020
Four-team trade
To Denver Nuggets

Rights to R. J. Hampton (#24) (from Milwaukee)

To Milwaukee Bucks

Jrue Holiday (from New Orleans)
Draft rights to Sam Merrill (#60) (from New Orleans)

To New Orleans Pelicans

Steven Adams (from Oklahoma City)
Eric Bledsoe (from Milwaukee)
2024 MIL first-round pick swap
2025 MIL first-round pick
2026 MIL first-round pick swap
2027 MIL first-round pick

To Oklahoma City Thunder

George Hill (from Milwaukee)
Zylan Cheatham (from New Orleans) (Sign and trade)
Josh Gray (from New Orleans) (Sign and trade)
Darius Miller (from New Orleans)
Kenrich Williams (from New Orleans) (Sign and trade)
2023 DEN protected first-round pick
2023 WAS second-round pick (from New Orleans)
2024 NO second-round pick

March 25, 2021
To Denver Nuggets

Aaron Gordon
Gary Clark

To Orlando Magic

Gary Harris
R. J. Hampton
2025 first-round pick

March 25, 2021
To Denver Nuggets

JaVale McGee

To Cleveland Cavaliers

Isaiah Hartenstein
2023 protected second-round pick
2027 second-round pick

=== Free agency ===
==== Re-signed ====
Player	Signed
Bol Bol	November 24, 2020 (Converted from two-way contract)
Paul Millsap	December 3, 2020
Monté Morris	December 9, 2020

==== Additions ====
Player	Signed	Former team
Greg Whittington	November 24, 2020; Two-way contract	(Turkey) Galatasaray
Isaiah Hartenstein	November 30, 2020	Houston Rockets
Markus Howard	November 30, 2020; Two-way contract	Marquette
Facundo Campazzo	November 30, 2020	(Spain) Real Madrid
JaMychal Green	November 30, 2020	Los Angeles Clippers
Shaquille Harrison	April 9, 2021; Two-way contract	Utah Jazz
Austin Rivers	April 20, 2021; 10-day contract April 30, 2021	New York Knicks

==== Subtractions ====
Date	Player	Reason	New team
November 22, 2020	Jerami Grant	Free Agency (sign and trade)	Detroit Pistons
November 22, 2020	Keita Bates-Diop	Waived	San Antonio Spurs
November 26, 2020	Torrey Craig	Free Agency	Milwaukee Bucks
November 27, 2020	Noah Vonleh	Free Agency	Chicago Bulls
December 1, 2020	Mason Plumlee	Free Agency	Detroit Pistons
December 3, 2020	Troy Daniels	Free Agency	(Italy) Olimpia Milano
December 3, 2020	Tyler Cook	Free Agency	Minnesota Timberwolves
April 9, 2021	Greg Whittington	Waived	(Russia) Lokomotiv Kuban
April 9, 2021	Gary Clark	Waived	Philadelphia 76ers
