= 2020–21 Los Angeles Lakers season =

American professional basketball season

- Head coach: Frank Vogel
- President: Jeanie Buss
- General manager: Rob Pelinka
- Owners: Jerry Buss family trust (primary owner being Jeanie Buss as of March 27, 2017)
- Arena: Staples Center

Results
- Record: 42–30 (.583)
- Place: Division: 3rd (Pacific); Conference: 7th (Western)
- Playoff finish: First round (Lost to Suns 2–4)
- Stats at Basketball Reference

Local media
- Television: Spectrum SportsNet
- Radio: ESPN LA 710 (English); 1020 Radio AM (Spanish)

The 2020–21 Los Angeles Lakers season was the franchise's 74th season, its 73rd season in the National Basketball Association (NBA), its 61st season in Los Angeles, and their 22nd season playing home games at Staples Center. The Lakers were coached by Frank Vogel in his second year as head coach. The Lakers played their home games at Staples Center as members of the Western Conference's Pacific Division. The Lakers entered the season as the defending Pacific Division, Western Conference, and NBA champions.

On November 10, 2020, the NBA announced that the 2020–21 season would begin on December 22, 2020, following the delayed finish to the 2019–20 season due to the ongoing COVID-19 pandemic. Each team was to play a shortened 72-game schedule. A week later, the NBA announced the format for the season which would include a play-in tournament to determine the seventh and eighth seeds in each conference. The second half of the schedule would not be announced until a later date to allow for the makeup of any games postponed due to COVID-19 issues.

The season began just 72 days after the completion of the 2020 finals, giving the Lakers and the Miami Heat the shortest off-season in league history. In February 2021, the Lakers had the second best record in the West at 21–7, two games behind the Utah Jazz, when Anthony Davis suffered a strained calf that sidelined him for 30 games. One game after Davis was injured, Dennis Schröder missed a span of four games, in which the Lakers were winless, due to the league's health and safety protocols. LeBron James missed 26 of the team's final 30 games with a sprained ankle. After Davis returned from his nine-week absence, the Lakers were 35–23, going 14–16 without him, including 6–10 with James out as well. Schröder also missed seven games in the final weeks of the season, again due to health and safety protocols.

In an injury-laden season, the Lakers finished with a 42–30 record (roughly the equivalent of 48–34), the same as the No. 5 Mavericks and No. 6 Trail Blazers; they fell to 7th place due to tiebreakers, resulting in the Lakers having to face the No. 8 Warriors in the play-in tournament, whom they defeated to secure the No. 7 seed in the playoffs. This was the first time in James's career that he did not have home court advantage in the first round of the playoffs. Against the second-seeded Phoenix Suns in the opening round, they were up 2–1 when Davis suffered a strained groin in Game 4. The Lakers were eliminated in six games, the first time in James's career that his team exited in the first round of the playoffs and the first defending NBA champion that was eliminated in the first round of the playoffs since the 2014–15 San Antonio Spurs.

== Previous season ==
The Lakers finished the 2019–20 season 52–19 to finish in 1st place in the Pacific Division and the Western Conference. In the playoffs, they defeated the Portland Trail Blazers, Houston Rockets, and Denver Nuggets each in five games to advance to the NBA Finals for the first time since 2010. There they defeated the Miami Heat (LeBron's former team) in six games to earn the franchise's 17th NBA championship.

== Offseason ==
=== Draft ===
Round	Pick	Player	Position	Nationality	School / club team
1	28	Jaden McDaniels	SF	United States	Washington (Fr.)

- This was a traded pick with the Oklahoma City Thunder that sent Danny Green and the draft rights to Jaden McDaniels to the Thunder in return for Dennis Schröder.
- Before the start of the 2020 NBA draft period, the Lakers' first-round selection was held stuck as the 29th pick of the draft with their record being the second-best of all NBA teams behind the Milwaukee Bucks the prior season at 49–14 before the NBA suspended their season on March 12, 2020. However, the Lakers did resume their season in the 2020 NBA Bubble, eventually winning their 17th championship there against the Miami Heat, leaving them a chance to move their first-round pick up or down for the 2020 draft. In the bubble, the Toronto Raptors ended up finishing with a better overall record than the Lakers, moving their first-round pick to the 28th selection instead, though still finishing as the best Western Conference team that season. The Lakers only held one first-round selection for this draft, as they traded their second-round pick to the Orlando Magic for the draft rights to Talen Horton-Tucker in last season's draft.

== Preseason ==
=== Game log ===
2020 preseason game log
Total: (home: 2–0; road: 2–0)
Preseason: 4–0 (home: 2–0; road: 2–0)

Game	Date	Team	Score	High points	High rebounds	High assists	Location Attendance	Record
1	December 11	L.A. Clippers	W 87–81	Talen Horton-Tucker (19)	Montrezl Harrell (12)	Kyle Kuzma (5)	Staples Center; 0	1–0
2	December 13	L.A. Clippers	W 131–106	Talen Horton-Tucker (33)	Montrezl Harrell (11)	Quinn Cook (7)	Staples Center; 0	2–0
3	December 16	@ Phoenix	W 112–107	Kyle Kuzma (23)	Marc Gasol (8)	Quinn Cook (4)	Mortgage Matchup Center; 0	3–0
4	December 18	@ Phoenix	W 114–113	Anthony Davis (35)	LeBron James (8)	Gasol, James (4)	Mortgage Matchup Center; 0	4–0

2020–21 season schedule

== Regular season ==
=== Standings ===
==== Division ====
Pacific Division	W	L	PCT	GB	Home	Road	Div	GP
y – Phoenix Suns	51	21	.708	–	27‍–‍9	24‍–‍12	7–5	72
x – Los Angeles Clippers	47	25	.653	4.0	26‍–‍10	21‍–‍15	9–3	72
x – Los Angeles Lakers	42	30	.583	9.0	21‍–‍15	21‍–‍15	4–8	72
pi – Golden State Warriors	39	33	.542	12.0	25‍–‍11	14‍–‍22	5–7	72
Sacramento Kings	31	41	.431	20.0	16‍–‍20	15‍–‍21	5–7	72

==== Conference ====
Western Conference
#	Team	W	L	PCT	GB	GP
1	z – Utah Jazz *	52	20	.722	–	72
2	y – Phoenix Suns *	51	21	.708	1.0	72
3	x – Denver Nuggets	47	25	.653	5.0	72
4	x – Los Angeles Clippers	47	25	.653	5.0	72
5	y – Dallas Mavericks *	42	30	.583	10.0	72
6	x – Portland Trail Blazers	42	30	.583	10.0	72
7	x – Los Angeles Lakers	42	30	.583	10.0	72
8	pi – Golden State Warriors	39	33	.542	13.0	72
9	x – Memphis Grizzlies	38	34	.528	14.0	72
10	pi – San Antonio Spurs	33	39	.458	19.0	72
11	New Orleans Pelicans	31	41	.431	21.0	72
12	Sacramento Kings	31	41	.431	21.0	72
13	Minnesota Timberwolves	23	49	.319	29.0	72
14	Oklahoma City Thunder	22	50	.306	30.0	72
15	Houston Rockets	17	55	.236	35.0	72

Notes

- z – Clinched home court advantage for the entire playoffs
- c – Clinched home court advantage for the conference playoffs
- y – Clinched division title
- x – Clinched playoff spot
- pi – Clinched play-in spot
- o – Eliminated from playoff contention
- * – Division leader

=== Game log ===
2020–21 game log
Total: 42–30 (home: 21–15; road: 21–15)
December: 3–2 (home: 2–2; road: 1–0)

Game	Date	Team	Score	High points	High rebounds	High assists	Location Attendance	Record
1	December 22	L. A. Clippers	L 109–116	LeBron James (22)	Dennis Schröder (12)	Dennis Schröder (8)	Staples Center; 0	0–1
2	December 25	Dallas	W 138–115	Anthony Davis (28)	Marc Gasol (9)	LeBron James (10)	Staples Center; 0	1–1
3	December 27	Minnesota	W 127–91	Kyle Kuzma (20)	LeBron James (9)	Marc Gasol (8)	Staples Center; 0	2–1
4	December 28	Portland	L 107–115	LeBron James (29)	Anthony Davis (10)	LeBron James (6)	Staples Center; 0	2–2
5	December 30	@ San Antonio	W 121–107	LeBron James (26)	Montrezl Harrell (9)	LeBron James (8)	AT&T Center; 0	3–2

January : 11–4 (home: 2–2; road: 9–2)

Game	Date	Team	Score	High points	High rebounds	High assists	Location Attendance	Record
6	January 1	@ San Antonio	W 109–103	Anthony Davis (34)	Davis, James, Harrell (11)	LeBron James (10)	AT&T Center; 0	4–2
7	January 3	@ Memphis	W 108–94	LeBron James (22)	LeBron James (13)	LeBron James (8)	FedEx Forum; 0	5–2
8	January 5	@ Memphis	W 94–92	Davis, James (26)	LeBron James (11)	LeBron James (7)	FedEx Forum; 0	6–2
9	January 7	San Antonio	L 109–118	LeBron James (27)	Davis, Kuzma (10)	LeBron James (12)	Staples Center; 0	6–3
10	January 8	Chicago	W 117–115	LeBron James (28)	Montrezl Harrell (14)	LeBron James (7)	Staples Center; 0	7–3
11	January 10	@ Houston	W 120–102	Anthony Davis (27)	Montrezl Harrell (8)	James, Schröder (7)	Toyota Center; 0	8–3
12	January 12	@ Houston	W 117–100	LeBron James (26)	Kyle Kuzma (11)	Gasol, James (5)	Toyota Center; 0	9–3
13	January 13	@ Oklahoma City	W 128–99	LeBron James (26)	Davis, Morris (7)	LeBron James (7)	Chesapeake Energy Arena; 0	10–3
14	January 15	New Orleans	W 112–95	LeBron James (21)	Kyle Kuzma (13)	LeBron James (11)	Staples Center; 0	11–3
15	January 18	Golden State	L 113–115	Dennis Schröder (25)	Anthony Davis (17)	Anthony Davis (7)	Staples Center; 0	11–4
16	January 21	@ Milwaukee	W 113–106	LeBron James (34)	Anthony Davis (9)	LeBron James (8)	Fiserv Forum; 0	12–4
17	January 23	@ Chicago	W 101–90	Anthony Davis (37)	LeBron James (11)	LeBron James (6)	United Center; 0	13–4
18	January 25	@ Cleveland	W 115–108	LeBron James (46)	Anthony Davis (10)	LeBron James (6)	Rocket Mortgage FieldHouse; 2,000	14–4
19	January 27	@ Philadelphia	L 106–107	LeBron James (36)	Anthony Davis (8)	LeBron James (7)	Wells Fargo Center; 0	14–5
20	January 28	@ Detroit	L 92–107	James, Kuzma (22)	Kyle Kuzma (10)	LeBron James (10)	Little Caesars Arena; 0	14–6
21	January 30	@ Boston	W 96–95	Anthony Davis (27)	Anthony Davis (14)	James, Schröder (7)	TD Garden; 0	15–6

February: 9–5 (home: 7–3; road: 2–2)

Game	Date	Team	Score	High points	High rebounds	High assists	Location Attendance	Record
22	February 1	@ Atlanta	W 107–99	Anthony Davis (25)	LeBron James (7)	LeBron James (9)	State Farm Arena; 1,341	16–6
23	February 4	Denver	W 114–93	LeBron James (27)	LeBron James (10)	LeBron James (10)	Staples Center; 0	17–6
24	February 6	Detroit	W 135–129 (2OT)	LeBron James (33)	Montrezl Harrell (8)	LeBron James (11)	Staples Center; 0	18–6
25	February 8	Oklahoma City	W 119–112 (OT)	LeBron James (28)	LeBron James (14)	LeBron James (12)	Staples Center; 0	19–6
26	February 10	Oklahoma City	W 114–113 (OT)	LeBron James (25)	Kyle Kuzma (9)	LeBron James (7)	Staples Center; 0	20–6
27	February 12	Memphis	W 115–105	Anthony Davis (35)	Kyle Kuzma (10)	LeBron James (8)	Staples Center; 0	21–6
28	February 14	@ Denver	L 105–122	LeBron James (22)	LeBron James (10)	LeBron James (9)	Ball Arena; 0	21–7
29	February 16	@ Minnesota	W 112–104	LeBron James (30)	LeBron James (13)	LeBron James (7)	Target Center; 0	22–7
30	February 18	Brooklyn	L 98–109	LeBron James (32)	Kyle Kuzma (10)	LeBron James (7)	Staples Center; 0	22–8
31	February 20	Miami	L 94–96	Kyle Kuzma (23)	Montrezl Harrell (10)	LeBron James (9)	Staples Center; 0	22–9
32	February 22	Washington	L 124–127 (OT)	LeBron James (31)	Kyle Kuzma (11)	LeBron James (13)	Staples Center; 0	22–10
33	February 24	@ Utah	L 89–114	LeBron James (19)	Markieff Morris (9)	Talen Horton-Tucker (5)	Vivint Arena; 4,912	22–11
34	February 26	Portland	W 102–93	LeBron James (28)	James, Kuzma (11)	LeBron James (7)	Staples Center; 0	23–11
35	February 28	Golden State	W 117–91	LeBron James (19)	Kyle Kuzma (11)	Dennis Schröder (6)	Staples Center; 0	24–11

March: 6–7 (home: 5–4; road: 1–3)

Game	Date	Team	Score	High points	High rebounds	High assists	Location Attendance	Record
36	March 2	Phoenix	L 104–114	LeBron James (38)	Caruso, Morris (6)	James, Schröder (6)	Staples Center; 0	24–12
37	March 3	@ Sacramento	L 120–123	Dennis Schröder (28)	Kyle Kuzma (13)	Dennis Schröder (9)	Golden 1 Center; 0	24–13
38	March 12	Indiana	W 105–100	Kyle Kuzma (24)	Kyle Kuzma (13)	LeBron James (10)	Staples Center; 0	25–13
39	March 15	@ Golden State	W 128–97	Montrezl Harrell (27)	LeBron James (10)	LeBron James (11)	Chase Center; 0	26–13
40	March 16	Minnesota	W 137–121	Harrell, James (25)	LeBron James (12)	LeBron James (12)	Staples Center; 0	27–13
41	March 18	Charlotte	W 116–105	LeBron James (37)	Montrezl Harrell (11)	Dennis Schröder (7)	Staples Center; 0	28–13
42	March 20	Atlanta	L 94–99	Montrezl Harrell (23)	Montrezl Harrell (11)	Horton-Tucker, James, Schröder (4)	Staples Center; 0	28–14
43	March 21	@ Phoenix	L 94–111	Montrezl Harrell (23)	Montrezl Harrell (10)	Kyle Kuzma (6)	Phoenix Suns Arena; 3,190	28–15
44	March 23	@ New Orleans	L 111–128	Montrezl Harrell (18)	Kyle Kuzma (10)	Kuzma, Schröder (7)	Smoothie King Center; 3,700	28–16
45	March 25	Philadelphia	L 101–109	Kyle Kuzma (25)	Kyle Kuzma (9)	Dennis Schröder (11)	Staples Center; 0	28–17
46	March 26	Cleveland	W 100–86	Montrezl Harrell (24)	Montrezl Harrell (10)	Kuzma, Schröder (7)	Staples Center; 0	29–17
47	March 28	Orlando	W 96–93	Dennis Schröder (24)	Harrell, Kuzma, Morris (11)	Dennis Schröder (6)	Staples Center; 0	30–17
48	March 31	Milwaukee	L 97–112	Montrezl Harrell (19)	Kyle Kuzma (7)	Dennis Schröder (8)	Staples Center; 0	30–18

April: 6–9 (home: 1–3; road: 5–6)

Game	Date	Team	Score	High points	High rebounds	High assists	Location Attendance	Record
49	April 2	@ Sacramento	W 115–94	Kyle Kuzma (30)	Caldwell-Pope, Harrell (10)	Dennis Schröder (8)	Golden 1 Center; 0	31–18
50	April 4	@ L. A. Clippers	L 86–104	Montrezl Harrell (19)	Kyle Kuzma (7)	Dennis Schröder (7)	Staples Center; 0	31–19
51	April 6	@ Toronto	W 110–101	Talen Horton-Tucker (17)	Gasol, Morris (9)	Dennis Schröder (9)	Amalie Arena; N/A (Note: Attendance not reported.)	32–19
52	April 8	@ Miami	L 104–110	Kentavious Caldwell-Pope (28)	Andre Drummond (12)	Dennis Schröder (14)	American Airlines Arena; N/A	32–20
53	April 10	@ Brooklyn	W 126–101	Andre Drummond (20)	Andre Drummond (11)	Talen Horton-Tucker (11)	Barclays Center; 1,773	33–20
54	April 12	@ New York	L 96–111	Dennis Schröder (21)	Andre Drummond (10)	Dennis Schröder (6)	Madison Square Garden; 1,981	33–21
55	April 13	@ Charlotte	W 101–93	Kyle Kuzma (24)	Andre Drummond (12)	Caruso, Schröder (6)	Spectrum Center; 3,676	34–21
56	April 15	Boston	L 113–121	Talen Horton-Tucker (19)	Montrezl Harrell (8)	Dennis Schröder (8)	Staples Center; 1,915	34–22
57	April 17	Utah	W 127–115 (OT)	Andre Drummond (27)	Markieff Morris (12)	Dennis Schröder (8)	Staples Center; 1,710	35–22
58	April 19	Utah	L 97–111	Talen Horton-Tucker (24)	Andre Drummond (8)	Dennis Schröder (6)	Staples Center; 1,709	35–23
59	April 22	@ Dallas	L 110–115	Kentavious Caldwell-Pope (29)	Andre Drummond (19)	Dennis Schröder (13)	American Airlines Center; 4,443	35–24
60	April 24	@ Dallas	L 93–108	Ben McLemore (20)	Andre Drummond (12)	Dennis Schröder (10)	American Airlines Center; 4,561	35–25
61	April 26	@ Orlando	W 114–103	Dennis Schröder (21)	Andre Drummond (11)	Dennis Schröder (10)	Amway Center; 4,099	36–25
62	April 28	@ Washington	L 107–116	Anthony Davis (26)	Andre Drummond (11)	Kuzma, Schröder (8)	Capital One Arena; 2,133	36–26
63	April 30	Sacramento	L 106–110	Anthony Davis (22)	Anthony Davis (11)	James, Schröder (7)	Staples Center; 2,691	36–27

May: 6–3 (home: 4–1; road: 2–2)

Game	Date	Team	Score	High points	High rebounds	High assists	Location Attendance	Record
64	May 2	Toronto	L 114–121	Kyle Kuzma (24)	Andre Drummond (11)	Davis, Horton-Tucker (7)	Staples Center; 2,053	36–28
65	May 3	Denver	W 93–89	Anthony Davis (25)	Caldwell-Pope, Davis, Gasol (7)	Caruso, Horton-Tucker, Morris (3)	Staples Center; 2,454	37–28
66	May 6	@ L. A. Clippers	L 94–118	Kyle Kuzma (25)	Drummond, Harrell (6)	Alex Caruso (7)	Staples Center; 3,275	37–29
67	May 7	@ Portland	L 101–106	Anthony Davis (36)	Anthony Davis (12)	Caldwell-Pope, Davis (5)	Moda Center; 1,939	37–30
68	May 9	Phoenix	W 123–110	Anthony Davis (42)	Anthony Davis (12)	Alex Caruso (8)	Staples Center; 3,144	38–30
69	May 11	New York	W 101–99 (OT)	Kyle Kuzma (23)	Andre Drummond (18)	Talen Horton-Tucker (10)	Staples Center; 3,550	39–30
70	May 12	Houston	W 124–122	Talen Horton-Tucker (23)	Drummond, Kuzma (10)	Talen Horton-Tucker (10)	Staples Center; 4,087	40–30
71	May 15	@ Indiana	W 122–115	Anthony Davis (28)	Andre Drummond (15)	LeBron James (8)	Bankers Life Fieldhouse; 0	41–30
72	May 16	@ New Orleans	W 110–98	LeBron James (25)	Andre Drummond (13)	Caldwell-Pope, James (6)	Smoothie King Center; 3,700	42–30

2020–21 season schedule

== Player stats ==
Legend
GP	Games played	GS	Games started	MPG	Minutes per game
FG%	Field-goal percentage	3P%	3-point field-goal percentage	FT%	Free-throw percentage
RPG	Rebounds per game	APG	Assists per game	SPG	Steals per game
BPG	Blocks per game	PPG	Points per game

=== Regular season statistics ===
Player	GP	GS	MPG	FG%	3P%	FT%	RPG	APG	SPG	BPG	PPG
LeBron James	45	45	33.4	.513	.365	.698	7.7	7.8	1.1	0.6	25.0
Anthony Davis	36	36	32.3	.491	.260	.738	7.9	3.1	1.3	1.6	21.8
Dennis Schröder	61	61	32.1	.437	.335	.848	3.5	5.8	1.1	0.2	15.4
Kyle Kuzma	68	32	28.7	.443	.361	.691	6.1	1.9	0.5	0.6	12.9
Kentavious Caldwell-Pope	67	67	28.4	.431	.410	.866	2.7	1.9	0.9	0.4	9.7
Andre Drummond*	21	21	24.8	.531	.000	.605	10.2	1.4	1.1	1.0	11.9
Montrezl Harrell	69	1	22.9	.622	.000	.707	6.2	1.1	0.7	0.7	13.5
Alex Caruso	58	6	21.0	.436	.401	.645	2.9	2.8	1.1	0.3	6.4
Talen Horton-Tucker	65	4	20.1	.458	.282	.775	2.6	2.8	1.0	0.3	9.0
Markieff Morris	61	27	19.7	.405	.311	.720	4.4	1.2	0.4	0.3	6.7
Wesley Matthews	58	10	19.5	.353	.335	.854	1.6	0.9	0.7	0.3	4.8
Marc Gasol	52	42	19.1	.454	.410	.720	4.1	2.1	0.5	1.1	5.0
Ben McLemore*	21	1	17.5	.390	.368	.762	1.6	0.5	0.1	0.3	8.0
Damian Jones^	8	6	14.0	.941	.000	.917	3.3	0.1	0.1	0.9	5.4
Jared Dudley	12	0	6.8	.222	.333	.000	1.8	0.4	0.1	0.0	3.1
Alfonzo McKinnie	39	0	6.6	.516	.410	.556	0.8	0.2	0.2	0.0	3.1
Devontae Cacok	20	1	4.9	.586	.000	.455	1.6	0.1	0.3	0.2	2.0
Quinn Cook*	16	0	3.9	.462	.385	.800	0.3	0.3	0.1	0.1	2.1
Kostas Antetokounmpo	15	0	3.7	.300	.000	.462	1.3	0.1	0.1	0.3	0.8

*Total with the Lakers only

== Play-in ==
2021 play-in game log
Total: 1–0 (home: 1–0)
Play-in: 1–0 (home: 1–0; road: 0–0)

Game	Date	Team	Score	High points	High rebounds	High assists	Location Attendance	Record
1	May 19	Golden State	W 103–100	Anthony Davis (25)	Anthony Davis (12)	LeBron James (10)	Staples Center; 6,022	1–0

== Playoffs ==
=== Game log ===
2021 playoff game log
Total: 2–4 (home: 1-2; road: 1–2)
First round: 2–4 (home: 1–2; road: 1–2)

Game	Date	Team	Score	High points	High rebounds	High assists	Location Attendance	Series
1	May 23	@ Phoenix	L 90–99	LeBron James (18)	Andre Drummond (9)	LeBron James (10)	Phoenix Suns Arena; 11,824	0–1
2	May 25	@ Phoenix	W 109–102	Anthony Davis (34)	Andre Drummond (12)	LeBron James (9)	Phoenix Suns Arena; 11,919	1–1
3	May 27	Phoenix	W 109–95	Anthony Davis (34)	Davis, Drummond (11)	LeBron James (9)	Staples Center; 7,825	2–1
4	May 30	Phoenix	L 92–100	LeBron James (25)	LeBron James (12)	LeBron James (6)	Staples Center; 8,025	2–2
5	June 1	@ Phoenix	L 85–115	LeBron James (24)	Andre Drummond (13)	LeBron James (7)	Phoenix Suns Arena; 16,163	2–3
6	June 3	Phoenix	L 100–113	LeBron James (29)	LeBron James (9)	Gasol, James (7)	Staples Center; 8,550	2–4

2021 playoff schedule

== Roster ==
2020–21 Los Angeles Lakers roster
Players

Pos.	No.	Player	Height	Weight	DOB	From
F	37	Kostas Antetokounmpo (TW)	6 ft 10 in (2.08 m)	200 lb (91 kg)	1997-11-20	Dayton
F	12	Devontae Cacok (TW)	6 ft 8 in (2.03 m)	240 lb (109 kg)	1996-10-08	UNC Wilmington
G	1	Kentavious Caldwell-Pope	6 ft 5 in (1.96 m)	204 lb (93 kg)	1993-02-18	Georgia
G	4	Alex Caruso	6 ft 4 in (1.93 m)	186 lb (84 kg)	1994-02-28	Texas A&M
F/C	3	Anthony Davis	6 ft 10 in (2.08 m)	253 lb (115 kg)	1993-03-11	Kentucky
C	2	Andre Drummond	6 ft 10 in (2.08 m)	279 lb (127 kg)	1993-08-10	Connecticut
F	10	Jared Dudley	6 ft 6 in (1.98 m)	237 lb (108 kg)	1985-07-10	Boston College
C	14	Marc Gasol	6 ft 11 in (2.11 m)	255 lb (116 kg)	1985-01-29	Spain
F/C	15	Montrezl Harrell	6 ft 7 in (2.01 m)	240 lb (109 kg)	1994-01-26	Louisville
G	5	Talen Horton-Tucker	6 ft 4 in (1.93 m)	234 lb (106 kg)	2000-11-25	Iowa State
F	23	LeBron James	6 ft 9 in (2.06 m)	250 lb (113 kg)	1984-12-30	St. Vincent-St. Mary HS (OH)
F	0	Kyle Kuzma	6 ft 10 in (2.08 m)	221 lb (100 kg)	1995-07-24	Utah
G	9	Wesley Matthews	6 ft 4 in (1.93 m)	220 lb (100 kg)	1986-10-14	Marquette
G	28	Alfonzo McKinnie	6 ft 7 in (2.01 m)	215 lb (98 kg)	1992-09-17	Green Bay
G	7	Ben McLemore	6 ft 3 in (1.91 m)	195 lb (88 kg)	1993-02-11	Kansas
F	88	Markieff Morris	6 ft 10 in (2.08 m)	245 lb (111 kg)	1989-09-02	Kansas
G	17	Dennis Schröder	6 ft 1 in (1.85 m)	172 lb (78 kg)	1993-09-15	Germany

Coaches
Head coach
- Frank Vogel
Assistant(s)
- Quinton Crawford
- Phil Handy
- Lionel Hollins
- Jason Kidd
- Mike Penberthy
- Miles Simon

Legend
- (DP) Unsigned draft pick
- (FA) Free agent
- (S) Suspended
- (GL) On assignment to G League affiliate
- (TW) Two-way affiliate player
- (L) On leave from the team
- Injured

Roster
Updated: April 7, 2021

== Transactions ==
=== Overview ===
Players Added

Via draft Via trade Via free agency

Players Lost

Via free agency Via retirement Waived

=== Trades ===
November 18, 2020	To Los Angeles Lakers Dennis Schröder	To Oklahoma City Thunder Danny Green; Draft rights to Jaden McDaniels (#28)
November 23, 2020	To Los Angeles Lakers Alfonzo McKinnie; Jordan Bell	To Cleveland Cavaliers JaVale McGee; 2026 LAL second-round pick

=== Free agency ===
==== Re-signed ====
Date	Player	Contract terms	Ref.
November 22	Kentavious Caldwell-Pope	3 year $40 million deal	
November 23	Markieff Morris	1 year $1.4 million deal	
November 26	Kostas Antetokounmpo	Two-way contract	
December 1	Jared Dudley	1 year $2.6 million deal	
December 2	LeBron James	2 year $85 million deal	
December 3	Anthony Davis	5 year $190 million deal	
December 4	Quinn Cook	1 year $1.7 million deal	
December 20	Kyle Kuzma	3 year $40 million deal	

==== Additions ====
Date	Player	Contract terms	Former team	Ref.
November 22	Montrezl Harrell	2 year $19 million deal	Los Angeles Clippers	
November 22	Wesley Matthews	1 year $3.6 million deal	Milwaukee Bucks	
November 24	Marc Gasol	2 year $5.3 million deal	Toronto Raptors	
March 28	Andre Drummond	1 year $794,536 deal	Cleveland Cavaliers	
April 6	Ben McLemore	1 year $455,000 deal	Houston Rockets	

==== Subtractions ====
Date	Player	Reason	New team	Ref.
November 21	Dwight Howard	1 year $2.6 million deal	Philadelphia 76ers	
November 23	Avery Bradley	2 year $11.6 million deal	Miami Heat	
November 23	Rajon Rondo	2 year $15 million deal	Atlanta Hawks	
February 22	Quinn Cook	Waived	Cleveland Cavaliers	
