= Alfonzo McKinnie =

American basketball player (born 1992)

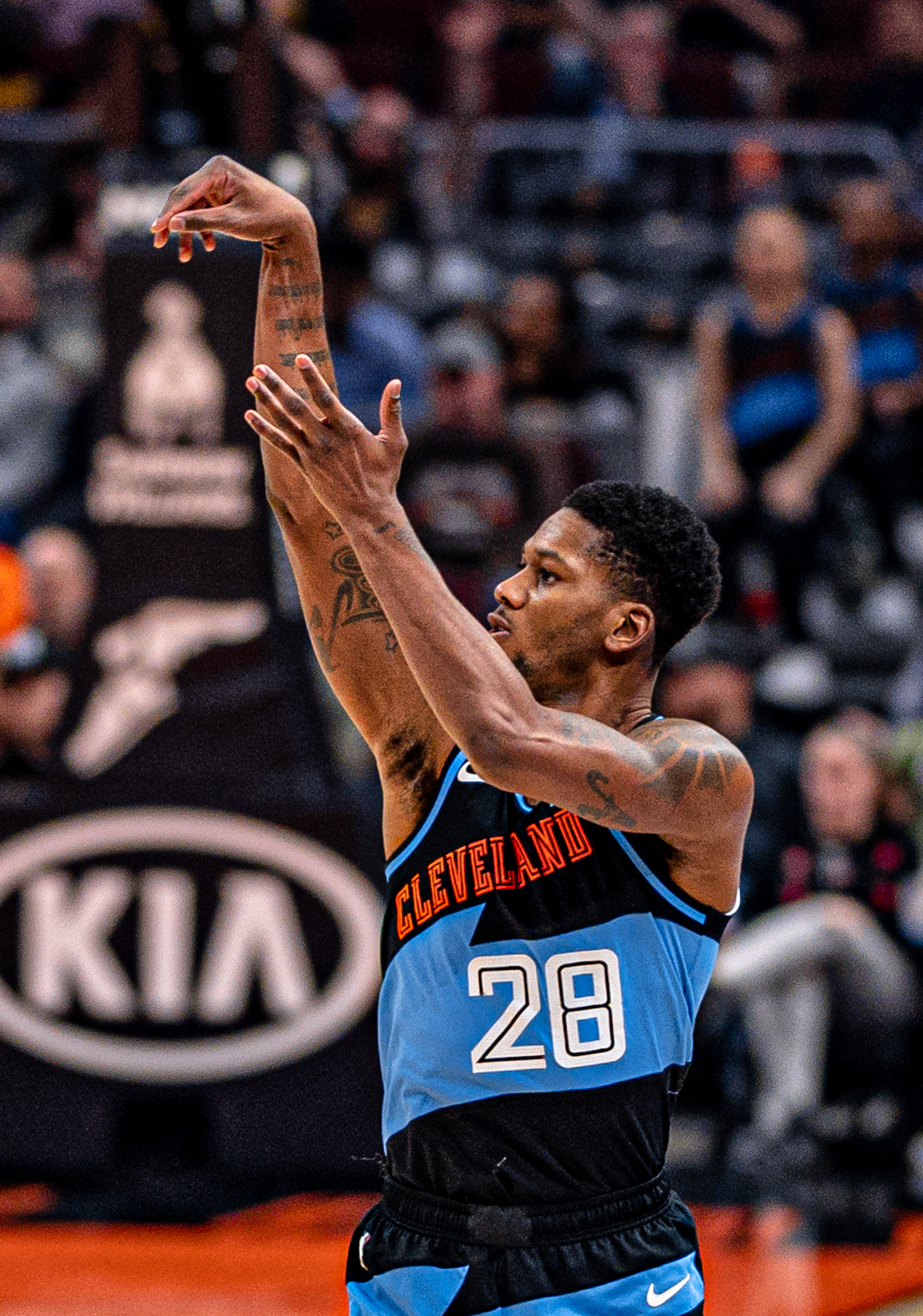
- McKinnie with the Cleveland Cavaliers in 2019

Dorados de Chihuahua
- Position: Small forward
- League: LNBP

Personal information
- Born: September 17, 1992 (age 34) Chicago, Illinois, U.S.
- Listed height: 6 ft 7 in (2.01 m)
- Listed weight: 215 lb (98 kg)

Career information
- High school: Curie (Chicago, Illinois); Marshall (Chicago, Illinois)
- College: Eastern Illinois (2010–2012); Green Bay (2013–2015)
- NBA draft: 2015: undrafted
- Playing career: 2015–present

Career history
- 2015–2016: East Side Pirates
- 2016: Rayos de Hermosillo
- 2016–2017: Windy City Bulls
- 2017–2018: Toronto Raptors
- 2017–2018: →Raptors 905
- 2018–2019: Golden State Warriors
- 2019–2020: Cleveland Cavaliers
- 2020–2021: Los Angeles Lakers
- 2021: Mexico City Capitanes
- 2021–2022: Chicago Bulls
- 2022–2023: Mexico City Capitanes
- 2023–2024: Dinamo Sassari
- 2024: Busan KCC Egis
- 2026–present: Dorados de Chihuahua
- Stats at NBA.com
- Stats at Basketball Reference
Medals
Men's 3x3 basketball
Representing the United States
World Cup
| Silver medal – second place | 2016 China | Team |

Alfonzo McKinnie (born September 17, 1992) is an American professional basketball player for Dorados de Chihuahua of the Liga Nacional de Baloncesto Profesional (LNBP). He played college basketball for the Eastern Illinois Panthers and the Green Bay Phoenix.

== Early life ==
McKinnie grew up on Chicago's West Side. Growing up just in East Garfield Park only about 15 minutes from the United Center, he describes himself as an enthusiastic supporter of the Chicago Bulls in youth. McKinnie played his first two years of high school basketball at Chicago's Curie Metropolitan High School. He played his final high school season as a starter at Marshall Metropolitan High School, during which he earned All-Red West Conference honors averaging 11.2 points and 8.5 rebounds per game.

== College career ==
McKinnie was not a big scorer and lightly recruited during his one year at Marshall HS. He got a chance to play at Eastern Illinois. As a sophomore he averaged 10.2 points and 7.0 rebounds per game. After his second year, he transferred to Wisconsin-Green Bay, where he tore his meniscus at the end of his redshirt season. Later, he tore his meniscus again and had it removed. He finished his college career averaging 7.1 points and 5.1 rebounds in 96 games.

== Professional career ==
=== East Side Pirates (2015–2016) ===
After going undrafted in the 2015 NBA draft, McKinnie started his career with the East Side Pirates in Luxembourg's semi-professional second division, where he became the go-to scorer, averaging 26 points per game.

=== Rayos de Hermosillo (2016) ===
On May 21, 2016, he signed with the Mexican team Rayos de Hermosillo. An old friend, former North Dakota forward Emmanuel Little, suggested he join the CIBACOPA. McKinnie became a strong player on the squad. He helped lead the Rayos to the regular-season title and the final series before falling four games to two against the Náuticos de Mazatlán.

=== Windy City Bulls (2016–2017) ===
In September 2016, McKinnie paid 175 dollars for a tryout with the Windy City Bulls of the NBA G League. On October 30, 2016, he made Bulls’ G-League roster. He played well for the Bulls in 2016.

=== Toronto Raptors (2017–2018) ===
On July 9, 2017, McKinnie signed with the Toronto Raptors. He made his NBA debut on October 19, 2017, playing in a single minute in their 117–100 win over the Chicago Bulls. During his rookie season, he received multiple assignments to Raptors 905, Toronto's NBA G League affiliate. On July 17, 2018, the Raptors waived McKinnie.

=== Golden State Warriors (2018–2019) ===
McKinnie signed with the Golden State Warriors for the 2018–19 season. He ultimately earned a spot on the team's opening night roster. He recorded his career first double-double (19 points, 10 rebounds, both career highs) in 27 minutes off the bench on October 29 against the Chicago Bulls. McKinnie averaged 4.7 points a game for the season while playing 72 games. The Warriors advanced to the 2019 NBA Finals, where they lost to the Toronto Raptors in six games. On October 18, 2019, the Warriors waived McKinnie.

=== Cleveland Cavaliers (2019–2020) ===
On October 21, 2019, the Cleveland Cavaliers claimed McKinnie off waivers. On January 6, 2020, he was waived by the Cavaliers. On January 9, the Cavaliers signed him to a 10-day contract. On January 23, McKinnie was re-signed to a second 10-day contract. On February 8, 2020, the Cleveland Cavaliers announced that they had signed McKinnie to a multi-year contract.

=== Los Angeles Lakers (2020–2021) ===
On November 22, 2020, McKinnie, along with Jordan Bell, was traded to the Lakers in exchange for JaVale McGee. On August 4, 2021, he was waived by the Lakers.

=== Mexico City Capitanes (2021) ===
On October 25, 2021, McKinnie signed with the Mexico City Capitanes of the NBA G League. In 10 games, he averaged 24.1 points, 9.8 rebounds and 1.5 assists.

=== Chicago Bulls (2021–2022) ===
On December 10, 2021, McKinnie signed a 10-day contract with his hometown team, the Chicago Bulls, due to numerous players on the team testing positive for COVID-19. On December 20, he signed a second 10-day contract. McKinnie described the move to the Chicago Bulls as "the biggest dream coming true". On December 26, McKinnie was signed for the rest of the season. On February 19, 2022, he was waived.

=== Return to Mexico City (2022–2023) ===
On November 4, 2022, McKinnie was named to the opening night roster for the Mexico City Capitanes.

=== Dinamo Banco di Sardegna Sassari (2023–2024) ===
On September 21, 2023, McKinnie signed with Dinamo Banco di Sardegna Sassari of the Lega Basket Serie A.

=== Busan KCC Egis (2024) ===
In June 2024, McKinnie joined to Busan KCC Egis for 2024 Basketball Champions League Asia.

On July 29, 2024, McKinnie signed with the Kobe Storks of the B.League. On August 23, 2024, his contract was terminated due to medical examination.

== Career statistics ==
Legend
| GP | Games played | GS | Games started | MPG | Minutes per game |
| FG% | Field goal percentage | 3P% | 3-point field goal percentage | FT% | Free throw percentage |
| RPG | Rebounds per game | APG | Assists per game | SPG | Steals per game |
| BPG | Blocks per game | PPG | Points per game | **Bold** | Career high |

=== NBA ===
==== Regular season ====
| Year | Team | GP | GS | MPG | FG% | 3P% | FT% | RPG | APG | SPG | BPG | PPG |
|---|---|---|---|---|---|---|---|---|---|---|---|---|
| 2017–18 | Toronto | 14 | 0 | 3.8 | **.533** | .333 | .667 | .5 | .1 | .1 | .1 | 1.5 |
| 2018–19 | Golden State | **72** | **5** | 13.9 | .487 | .356 | .563 | **3.4** | **.4** | .3 | **.2** | **4.7** |
| 2019–20 | Cleveland | 40 | 1 | **14.8** | .427 | .215 | **.710** | 2.8 | **.4** | **.6** | **.2** | 4.6 |
| 2020–21 | L.A. Lakers | 39 | 0 | 6.6 | .516 | **.410** | .556 | 1.4 | .2 | .2 | .0 | 3.1 |
| 2021–22 | Chicago | 17 | 3 | 12.1 | .393 | .333 | .250 | 1.9 | .3 | .1 | .2 | 3.5 |
| Career | | 182 | 9 | 11.6 | .467 | .326 | .583 | 2.5 | .3 | .3 | .1 | 4.0 |

==== Playoffs ====
| Year | Team | GP | GS | MPG | FG% | 3P% | FT% | RPG | APG | SPG | BPG | PPG |
|---|---|---|---|---|---|---|---|---|---|---|---|---|
| 2019 | Golden State | **22** | **1** | **10.7** | **.441** | **.313** | **.400** | **2.3** | **.2** | **.1** | .0 | **3.0** |
| 2021 | L.A. Lakers | 2 | 0 | 6.0 | .000 | .000 | — | .5 | .0 | .0 | .0 | .0 |
| Career | | 24 | 1 | 10.3 | .419 | .294 | .400 | 2.1 | .2 | .1 | .0 | 2.8 |

=== College ===
| Year | Team | GP | GS | MPG | FG% | 3P% | FT% | RPG | APG | SPG | BPG | PPG |
|---|---|---|---|---|---|---|---|---|---|---|---|---|
| 2010–11 | Eastern Illinois | 25 | 5 | 11.8 | .545 | – | .531 | 3.6 | .2 | .5 | .2 | 3.6 |
| 2011–12 | Eastern Illinois | 29 | **28** | **23.8** | **.567** | – | .722 | **7.0** | **.4** | **.6** | **.8** | **10.2** |
| 2013–14 | Green Bay | 9 | 0 | 12.8 | .429 | **.462** | **.833** | 2.8 | .2 | .3 | .4 | 4.6 |
| 2014–15 | Green Bay | **33** | 20 | 21.6 | .453 | .328 | .508 | 5.3 | .2 | .5 | .5 | 8.0 |
| Career | | 96 | 53 | 18.9 | .506 | .351 | .622 | 5.2 | .2 | .5 | .5 | 7.2 |

== Personal life ==
He is the son of Elisa Bryant and Alfonzo McKinnie Sr. In 2018, during his first stop in Chicago with the Warriors, he signed papers to buy his mother a house, and introduced his parents at the Warriors team dinner after he helped Golden State blow out the Bulls.

He was previously engaged to Johanna Leia.
