= Damian Jones (basketball) =

American basketball player (born 1995)

- Jones with Real Madrid in 2026

No. 30 – Real Madrid
- Position: Center
- League: Liga ACB; EuroLeague

Personal information
- Born: June 30, 1995 (age 31) Baton Rouge, Louisiana, U.S.
- Listed height: 6 ft 11 in (2.11 m)
- Listed weight: 245 lb (111 kg)

Career information
- High school: Scotlandville Magnet (Baton Rouge, Louisiana)
- College: Vanderbilt (2013–2016)
- NBA draft: 2016: 1st round, 30th overall pick
- Drafted by: Golden State Warriors
- Playing career: 2016–present

Career history
- 2016–2019: Golden State Warriors
- 2016–2018: →Santa Cruz Warriors
- 2019–2020: Atlanta Hawks
- 2020–2021: Phoenix Suns
- 2021: Los Angeles Lakers
- 2021–2022: Sacramento Kings
- 2022–2023: Los Angeles Lakers
- 2023: Utah Jazz
- 2023–2024: Cleveland Cavaliers
- 2024–2026: Zhejiang Golden Bulls
- 2026: Vaqueros de Bayamón
- 2026–present: Real Madrid

Career highlights
- 2× NBA champion (2017, 2018); EuroLeague SuperCup champion (2026); BSN champion (2026); 2× First-team All-SEC (2015, 2016)
- Stats at NBA.com
- Stats at Basketball Reference

Damian William Jones (born June 30, 1995) is an American professional basketball player for Real Madrid of the Liga ACB and the EuroLeague. He played college basketball for the Vanderbilt Commodores and was selected in the first round of the 2016 NBA draft by the Golden State Warriors with the 30th overall pick. Jones is a two-time NBA champion, having won both with Golden State in 2017 and 2018.

== High school career ==
Jones attended Scotlandville Magnet High School in Baton Rouge, Louisiana where he averaged 15.4 points, 8.0 rebounds, 4.0 blocks, and 2.0 assists as a senior. Jones was rated by Rivals.com as a four-star recruit and committed to Vanderbilt University.

== College career ==
In three seasons at Vanderbilt, Jones averaged 13.3 points, 6.4 rebounds, 1.69 blocks and 27.2 minutes in 99 games, garnering first-team All-SEC honors as both a sophomore and junior. He hit 56.6 percent from the field during his collegiate career, the third-best mark in Vanderbilt history, while finishing second on the school's all-time blocks list (167). As a junior in 2015–16, Jones averaged 13.9 points, 6.9 rebounds and 1.64 blocks in 33 games, helping Vanderbilt to their first NCAA Tournament berth since 2011–12.

On April 14, 2016, Jones declared for the NBA draft, forgoing his final year of college eligibility.

== Professional career ==
=== Golden State Warriors (2016–2019) ===
While working out with the Orlando Magic in the lead up to the draft, Jones suffered a torn pectoral muscle in his right arm, which required surgery. Despite this, Jones was selected by the Golden State Warriors with the 30th overall pick in the 2016 NBA draft. He signed with the Warriors on July 13, and made his NBA debut on December 10 against the Memphis Grizzlies. On February 1, 2017, in his first game for the Warriors at Oracle Arena, Jones scored his first career NBA points in a 126–111 victory over the Charlotte Hornets. He appeared in 10 regular-season games and four playoff games during the 2016–17 season. The Warriors won the 2017 NBA Finals after defeating the Cleveland Cavaliers in five games. The Warriors finished the playoffs with a 16–1 record, the best postseason winning percentage in NBA history.

The 2017–18 season saw Jones appear in 15 regular-season games and four playoff games, as the Warriors returned to the NBA Finals, where they won their second straight championship over the Cavaliers in a four-game sweep. During his first two seasons, Jones received multiple assignments to the Santa Cruz Warriors, Golden State's G League affiliate.

Jones became the starting center for the Warriors in 2018–19, starting in 22 of the Warriors' first 24 games. On December 1, 2018, he suffered a torn left pectoral muscle in a 111–102 loss to the Detroit Pistons. He initially was ruled out for the season after undergoing surgery to repair the muscle. Jones returned to action during the Western Conference Finals. The Warriors went on to reach the 2019 NBA Finals, where they lost to the Toronto Raptors in six games.

=== Atlanta Hawks (2019–2020) ===
On July 8, 2019, Jones and with a 2026 second-round pick were traded to the Atlanta Hawks in exchange for Omari Spellman.

=== Phoenix Suns (2020–2021) ===
On November 30, 2020, Jones signed a two-year deal with the Phoenix Suns. In 14 games, he averaged 1.6 points and 1.3 rebounds per game.

On February 23, 2021, Jones was waived by the Suns.

=== Los Angeles Lakers (2021) ===
On February 26, 2021, Jones signed a 10-day contract with the Los Angeles Lakers. On March 11, the Lakers signed him to another 10-day contract.

=== Sacramento Kings (2021–2022) ===
On April 7, 2021, Jones signed a 10-day contract with the Sacramento Kings. He signed a second one 10 days later. On April 28, Jones signed a multi-year deal with the Kings after appearing in six games, including two starts.

=== Return to the Lakers (2022–2023) ===
On July 1, 2022, Jones signed a two-year deal with the Los Angeles Lakers.

=== Utah Jazz (2023) ===
On February 9, 2023, Jones was traded to the Utah Jazz in a three-team trade involving the Minnesota Timberwolves. He made his Jazz debut on February 15, recording seven points, two rebounds and two blocks in a 117–111 loss to the Memphis Grizzlies.

On June 20, 2023, Jones exercised his $2.59 million player option to return to the Jazz for the 2023–24 season.

=== Cleveland Cavaliers (2023–2024) ===
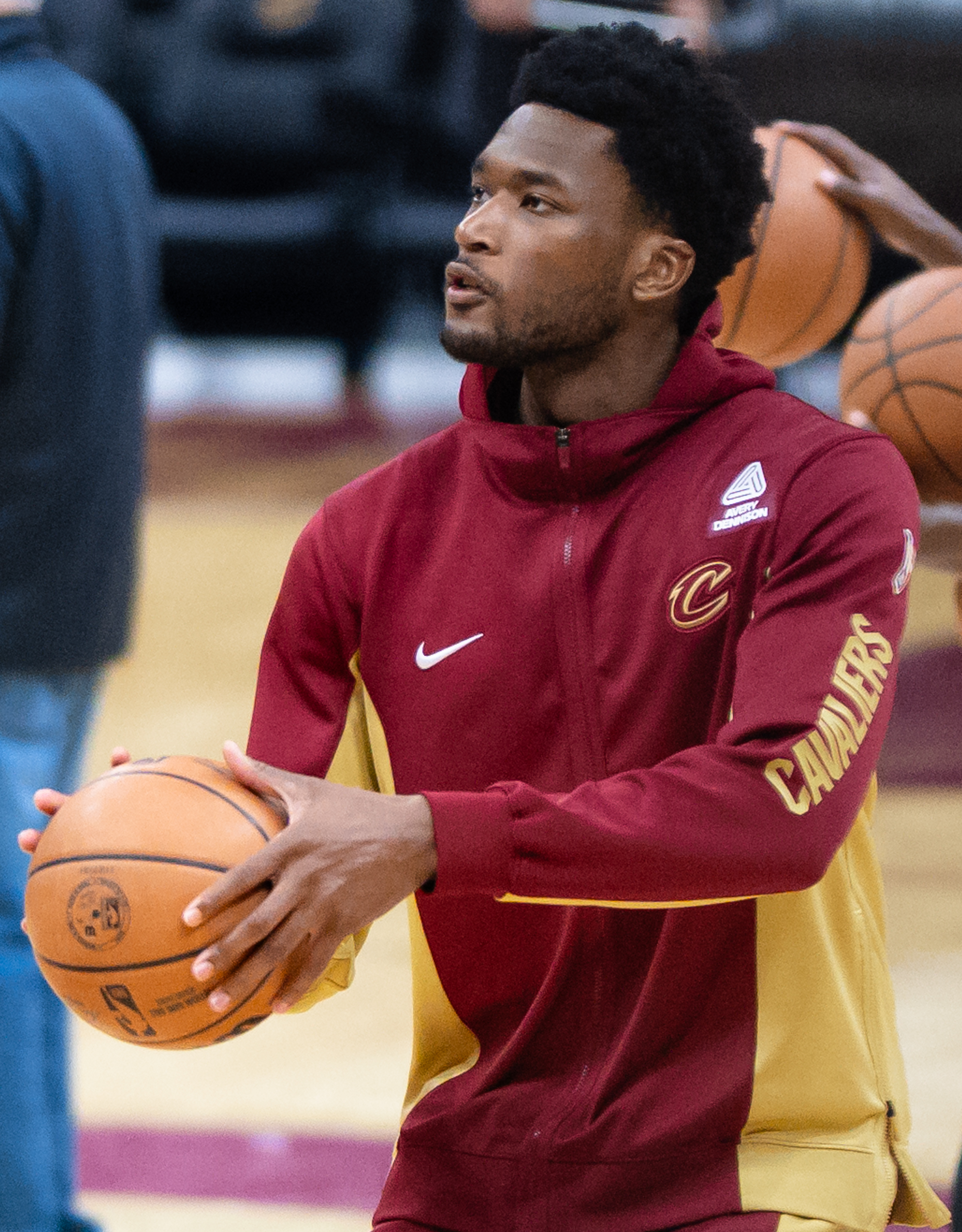
Jones with the Cleveland Cavaliers in 2023

On July 8, 2023, Jones was traded to the Cleveland Cavaliers.

=== Zhejiang Golden Bulls (2024–2026) ===
On August 2, 2024, Jones signed with the Zhejiang Golden Bulls of the Chinese Basketball Association.

=== Vaqueros de Bayamón (2026) ===
On June 7, 2026, Jones joined the reigning champions Vaqueros de Bayamón of the BSN, joining Jae Crowder as the third import. On June 9, Jones made his debut with the team scoring 11 points, three rebounds, and two blocks in 18 minutes. The team won by a landslide 105-63 against the Capitanes de Arecibo.

In Game 1 of the 2026 BSN Finals against the Santeros de Aguada, Jones recorded a double-double with 20 points, 15 rebounds, and one block, helping lead Bayamón to a 91–75 victory. On August 23, 2026, Jones helped the Vaqueros de Bayamón capture their second consecutive BSN championship, defeating the Santeros de Aguada in seven games in the 2026 BSN Finals.

=== Real Madrid (2026–present) ===
On August 28, 2026, Jones signed a one–year contract with Real Madrid of the Spanish Liga ACB and the EuroLeague.

== Career statistics ==
Legend
GP	Games played	GS	Games started	MPG	Minutes per game
FG%	Field goal percentage	3P%	3-point field goal percentage	FT%	Free throw percentage
RPG	Rebounds per game	APG	Assists per game	SPG	Steals per game
BPG	Blocks per game	PPG	Points per game	**Bold**	Career high
†	Won an NBA championship

=== NBA ===
==== Regular season ====
Year	Team	GP	GS	MPG	FG%	3P%	FT%	RPG	APG	SPG	BPG	PPG
2016–17†	Golden State	10	0	8.5	.500	—	.300	2.3	.0	.1	.4	1.9
2017–18†	Golden State	15	0	5.9	.500	—	.600	.9	.1	.1	.2	1.7
2018–19	Golden State	24	22	17.1	.716	—	.649	3.1	1.2	**.5**	**1.0**	5.4
2019–20	Atlanta	55	**27**	16.1	.680	.222	.738	3.7	.6	**.5**	.7	5.6
2020–21	Phoenix	14	0	6.7	.500	.000	.545	1.3	.3	.1	.4	1.6
2020–21	L.A. Lakers	8	6	14.0	**.941**	—	**.917**	3.3	.1	.1	.9	5.4
2020–21	Sacramento	17	4	**20.0**	.657	.250	.714	**4.5**	**1.4**	**.5**	**1.0**	6.9
2021–22	Sacramento	**56**	15	18.2	.658	.345	.718	4.4	1.2	**.5**	.8	**8.1**
2022–23	L.A. Lakers	22	1	8.0	.541	.000	.750	2.5	.2	.1	.5	2.5
2022–23	Utah	19	0	15.8	.714	**.714**	.778	3.5	.6	.3	.5	4.6
2023–24	Cleveland	39	0	6.9	.597	.214	.857	1.6	.4	.2	.3	2.7
Career		279	75	13.5	.656	.351	.715	3.1	.7	.3	.7	4.9

==== Playoffs ====
Year	Team	GP	GS	MPG	FG%	3P%	FT%	RPG	APG	SPG	BPG	PPG
2017†	Golden State	**4**	0	**5.2**	.429	—	.500	**1.5**	.0	**.5**	.3	**1.8**
2018†	Golden State	**4**	0	2.7	.500	—	**.667**	.8	.0	.0	.0	1.0
2019	Golden State	**4**	**1**	2.0	**1.000**	—	.500	.5	.0	.0	.0	.8
2024	Cleveland	2	0	4.6	—	—	—	1.0	**1.0**	.0	**.5**	.0
Career		14	1	3.5	.500	—	.571	.9	.1	.1	.1	1.0

=== College ===
Year	Team	GP	GS	MPG	FG%	3P%	FT%	RPG	APG	SPG	BPG	PPG
2013–14	Vanderbilt	31	28	25.7	.543	—	.545	5.7	.2	.3	1.4	11.3
2014–15	Vanderbilt	**35**	**34**	**29.1**	.562	**.200**	**.599**	6.5	.7	**.6**	**2.0**	**14.5**
2015–16	Vanderbilt	33	33	26.2	**.590**	.000	.536	**6.9**	**1.2**	.2	1.6	13.9
Career		99	95	27.1	.566	.125	.565	6.4	.7	.4	1.7	13.3

== Personal life ==
His parents are David and Dana Jones. He has two brothers: Darian and Darryl. Jones majored in engineering science.
