= Marcus Derrickson =

American basketball player (born 1996)

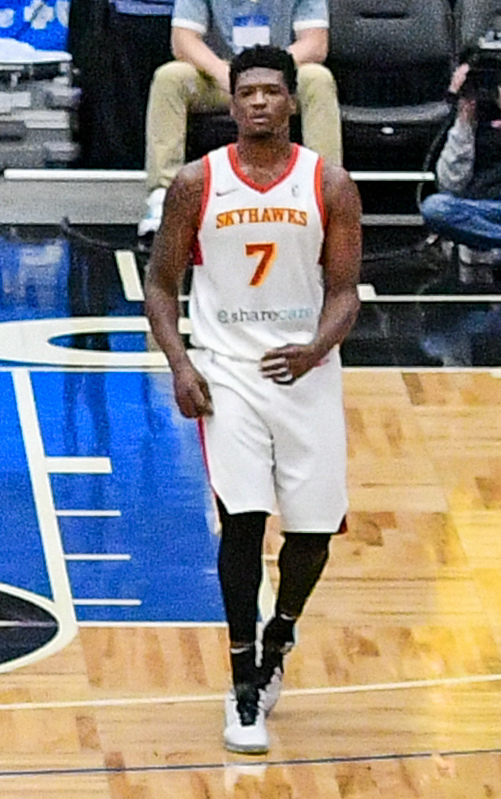

Free agent
- Position: Power forward

Personal information
- Born: February 1, 1996 (age 30) Washington, D.C., U.S.
- Listed height: 6 ft 7 in (2.01 m)
- Listed weight: 250 lb (113 kg)

Career information
- High school: Paul VI Catholic (Fairfax, Virginia); Brewster Academy (Wolfeboro, New Hampshire)
- College: Georgetown (2015–2018)
- NBA draft: 2018: undrafted
- Playing career: 2018–present

Career history
- 2018–2019: Golden State Warriors
- 2018–2019: →Santa Cruz Warriors
- 2019–2020: College Park Skyhawks
- 2020: Busan KT Sonicboom
- 2022: Maine Celtics
- 2022: Seoul Samsung Thunders
- 2024–2025: Seoul Samsung Thunders

Career highlights
- Second-team All-Big East (2018)
- Stats at NBA.com
- Stats at Basketball Reference

Marcus Rashad Derrickson (born February 1, 1996) is an American professional basketball player who last played for the Seoul Samsung Thunders of the Korean Basketball League (KBL). He played college basketball for Georgetown.

== High school career ==
Derrickson played three years of high school basketball for Paul VI Catholic High School in Virginia, leading the Panthers to two Washington Catholic Athletic Conference titles. As a junior, he averaged 11.8 points per game and was named to the All-Met Team. Derrickson transferred to Brewster Academy in New Hampshire for his final high school year. He was the No. 81 overall prospect in his class according to Rivals.com and committed to Georgetown in October 2013.

== College career ==
As a freshman at Georgetown, Derrickson posted 7.1 points and 4.5 rebounds per game. Derrickson averaged 8.3 points and 4.4 rebounds per game was a sophomore. As a junior, he was named to the Second Team All-Big East. On January 20, 2018, Derrickson scored a career-high 27 points in a win over St. John's in double overtime. In the final game of the season, a loss to Villanova, Derrickson sat out due to an injured right ankle. Derrickson averaged 15.9 points and 8.1 rebounds per game, second on the team in both categories to Jessie Govan, and was the top three-point shooter, making 46.5 percent of his attempts. After his junior season, Derrickson signed with an agent and entered the NBA draft, thus forgoing his senior season at Georgetown.

== Professional career ==
=== Golden State Warriors (2018–2019) ===
After going undrafted in the 2018 NBA draft, Derrickson signed with the Golden State Warriors for NBA Summer League play. Derrickson signed a training camp contract with the Warriors on September 20, 2018. On October 13, the Warriors converted the deal to a two-way contract with their NBA G League affiliate, the Santa Cruz Warriors. In his G League debut, Derrickson contributed 20 points on 7-of-10 shooting, three rebounds and three assists as the Warriors defeated the Northern Arizona Suns 118–108. Derrickson made his NBA debut on November 10, 2018, recording 2 points and 1 rebound, in 6 minutes, in a 116–100 win against the Brooklyn Nets. The Warriors made it to the 2019 NBA Finals, but were defeated in 6 games by the Toronto Raptors.

=== College Park Skyhawks (2019–2020) ===
On August 23, 2019, Derrickson signed an Exhibit 10 contract with the Atlanta Hawks. On October 18, 2019, the Hawks waived Derrickson. He was then added to the roster of the Hawks’ G League affiliate, the College Park Skyhawks. Despite averaging 13.1 points, 5.3 rebounds and 1.8 assists over 27.8 minutes per contest, Derrickson was waived on March 4, 2020.

=== Busan KT Sonicboom (2020) ===
On June 26, 2020, Derrickson signed with the Busan KT Sonicboom of the Korean Basketball League (KBL). On November 24, he was replaced by Cliff Alexander.

On December 11, 2021, Derrickson signed with the Goyang Orion Orions of the Korean Basketball League, replacing Miroslav Raduljica. However, he couldn't play for the team due to doping.

=== Maine Celtics (2022) ===
On March 8, 2022, Derrickson was acquired by the Maine Celtics from the available player pool.

=== Seoul Samsung Thunders (2022) ===
On August 11, 2022, Derrickson signed with the Seoul Samsung Thunders of the Korean Basketball League. On December 14, he was temporarily replaced by Jonathan Arledge due to injury. In January 2023, he left the team.

=== Second stint with the Seoul Samsung Thunders (2024–2025) ===
On July 1, 2024, Derrickson rejoined the Seoul Samsung Thunders of the Korean Basketball League. On February 26, 2025, he was replaced by Glenn Robinson III.

== Career statistics ==
Legend
GP	Games played	GS	Games started	MPG	Minutes per game
FG%	Field goal percentage	3P%	3-point field goal percentage	FT%	Free throw percentage
RPG	Rebounds per game	APG	Assists per game	SPG	Steals per game
BPG	Blocks per game	PPG	Points per game	**Bold**	Career high

=== NBA ===
==== Regular season ====
Year	Team	GP	GS	MPG	FG%	3P%	FT%	RPG	APG	SPG	BPG	PPG
2018–19	Golden State	11	0	6.1	.485	.500	.800	1.2	.1	.0	.1	4.2
Career		11	0	6.1	.485	.500	.800	1.2	.1	.0	.1	4.2

=== College ===
Year	Team	GP	GS	MPG	FG%	3P%	FT%	RPG	APG	SPG	BPG	PPG
2015–16	Georgetown	**32**	27	21.6	.407	.376	**.869**	4.5	1.1	.4	.6	7.1
2016–17	Georgetown	28	17	23.8	.432	.344	.828	4.4	1.4	.4	.6	8.3
2017–18	Georgetown	29	**29**	**32.0**	**.505**	**.465**	.863	**8.1**	**1.6**	**.7**	**.7**	**15.9**
Career		89	73	25.7	.459	.397	.856	5.6	1.4	.5	.6	10.3
