= 2018–19 Golden State Warriors season =

NBA professional basketball team season

- Conference champions
- Division champions
- Head coach: Steve Kerr
- General manager: Bob Myers
- Owners: Joe Lacob; Peter Guber
- Arena: Oracle Arena

Results
- Record: 57–25 (.695)
- Place: Division: 1st (Pacific); Conference: 1st (Western)
- Playoff finish: NBA Finals (lost to Raptors 2–4)
- Stats at Basketball Reference

Local media
- Television: NBC Sports Bay Area
- Radio: 95.7 The Game

The 2018–19 Golden State Warriors season was the 73rd season of the franchise in the National Basketball Association (NBA), and its 57th in the San Francisco Bay Area. The Warriors entered the season as the two-time defending NBA champions, having won back-to-back NBA championships. The Warriors attempted their first "three-peat" in franchise history, but were defeated by the Toronto Raptors in the 2019 NBA Finals. This was the Warriors' final season at Oracle Arena in Oakland, before moving to the new Chase Center in San Francisco, beginning with the 2019–20 NBA season. The Warriors won the Pacific Division title and Western Conference Championship for the fifth consecutive season. They finished with the best record in the Western Conference, with a record of 57–25. Golden State made the playoffs for the seventh consecutive season, a new franchise record. The previous record was six, in the team's first six years of existence between 1947 and 1952. Golden State recorded 50 wins for the sixth consecutive season, a franchise record. In the postseason, the Warriors defeated the Los Angeles Clippers 4–2 in the first round, the Houston Rockets 4–2 in the Western Conference Semi-finals, and swept the Portland Trail Blazers 4–0 in the Western Conference finals. The Warriors' run ended in the NBA Finals, where they lost 4–2 to the Toronto Raptors. Golden State made their fifth consecutive Finals appearance and are the second team in NBA history to achieve this feat after the Boston Celtics made ten straight between 1957–1966. (Note: The Celtics advanced 10 straight times, winning nine, including eight consecutive.) The Warriors playoff run was riddled with injuries, with DeMarcus Cousins (quadriceps tear in the first round), Stephen Curry (dislocated finger in the semi-finals), Kevin Durant (calf strain in the semi-finals, ruptured achilles in the finals), Andre Iguodala (calf strain in the Western Conference finals), Klay Thompson (hamstring strain and a torn ACL in the finals), and Kevon Looney (fractured collar bone in the finals) all missing a combined total of 26 games.

Thompson broke the NBA record for three-pointers made in a game with 14, surpassing the 13 made by teammate Curry in the 2016–17 season. Curry broke the NBA record for most three-pointers made in the playoffs with 470. The record was held by Ray Allen, who had 385. This season Curry also moved into third on the all-time career three-point scoring list with 2,483; only Allen and Reggie Miller having made more three-pointers during the regular season in NBA history. Curry, Durant, and Thompson were all named to the All-Star Game. Durant was named MVP of the game, the fourth time a Warrior player has won the award and first since 1967. Curry and Durant were named to the All-NBA Team. Green and Thompson were named to All-Defensive Team, it was Green's fifth consecutive selection which tied Nate Thurmond for the most selections in franchise history. With the addition of free agent DeMarcus Cousins in the off-season, the Warriors had five All-Stars on their roster that were named to the 2018 All-Star Game. This is the sixth time in NBA history a team has had five All-Stars from the previous season, and the first since the Boston Celtics in 1976. From November 15 to 21, the Warriors lost four games in a row for the first time since the 2012–13 season, and for the first time under the tenure of Steve Kerr.

Following the season, Durant signed with the Brooklyn Nets as a free agent, Iguodala was traded to the Memphis Grizzlies, Cousins signed with the Los Angeles Lakers as a free agent, and Shaun Livingston retired.

== Draft ==
| Round | Pick | Player | Position | Nationality | School / club team |
|---|---|---|---|---|---|
| 1 | 28 | Jacob Evans | SG | United States | Cincinnati (Jr.) |

== Roster ==
2018–19 Golden State Warriors roster
Players

| Pos. | No. | Player | Height | Weight | DOB | From |
|---|---|---|---|---|---|---|
| F | 2 | Jordan Bell | 6 ft 9 in (2.06 m) | 224 lb (102 kg) | 1995–01–07 | Oregon |
| C | 12 | Andrew Bogut | 7 ft 0 in (2.13 m) | 260 lb (118 kg) | 1984–11–28 | Utah |
| G | 4 | Quinn Cook | 6 ft 2 in (1.88 m) | 179 lb (81 kg) | 1993–03–23 | Duke |
| C | 0 | DeMarcus Cousins | 6 ft 11 in (2.11 m) | 270 lb (122 kg) | 1990–08–13 | Kentucky |
| G | 30 | Stephen Curry | 6 ft 3 in (1.91 m) | 190 lb (86 kg) | 1988–03–14 | Davidson |
| F | 32 | Marcus Derrickson (TW) | 6 ft 7 in (2.01 m) | 249 lb (113 kg) | 1996–02–01 | Georgetown |
| F | 35 | Kevin Durant | 6 ft 9 in (2.06 m) | 240 lb (109 kg) | 1988–09–29 | Texas |
| G | 10 | Jacob Evans | 6 ft 6 in (1.98 m) | 210 lb (95 kg) | 1997–06–18 | Cincinnati |
| F | 23 | Draymond Green | 6 ft 7 in (2.01 m) | 230 lb (104 kg) | 1990–03–04 | Michigan State |
| G/F | 9 | Andre Iguodala | 6 ft 6 in (1.98 m) | 215 lb (98 kg) | 1984–01–28 | Arizona |
| F | 21 | Jonas Jerebko | 6 ft 10 in (2.08 m) | 231 lb (105 kg) | 1987–03–02 | Sweden |
| C | 15 | Damian Jones | 7 ft 0 in (2.13 m) | 245 lb (111 kg) | 1995–06–30 | Vanderbilt |
| G | 1 | Damion Lee (TW) | 6 ft 6 in (1.98 m) | 210 lb (95 kg) | 1992–10–21 | Louisville |
| G | 34 | Shaun Livingston | 6 ft 7 in (2.01 m) | 192 lb (87 kg) | 1985–09–11 | Peoria HS (IL) |
| F/C | 5 | Kevon Looney | 6 ft 9 in (2.06 m) | 220 lb (100 kg) | 1996–02–06 | UCLA |
| F | 28 | Alfonzo McKinnie | 6 ft 8 in (2.03 m) | 215 lb (98 kg) | 1992–09–17 | Green Bay |
| G | 11 | Klay Thompson | 6 ft 7 in (2.01 m) | 215 lb (98 kg) | 1990–02–08 | Washington State |

Coaches
Head coach
- Steve Kerr
Assistant(s)
- Mike Brown
- Bruce Fraser
- Ron Adams
- Jarron Collins
- Chris DeMarco (assistant coach &
  director of player development)
- Willie Green (player development)

Legend
- (DP) Unsigned draft pick
- (FA) Free agent
- (S) Suspended
- (GL) On assignment to G League affiliate
- (TW) Two-way affiliate player
- Injured

Roster

== Records ==
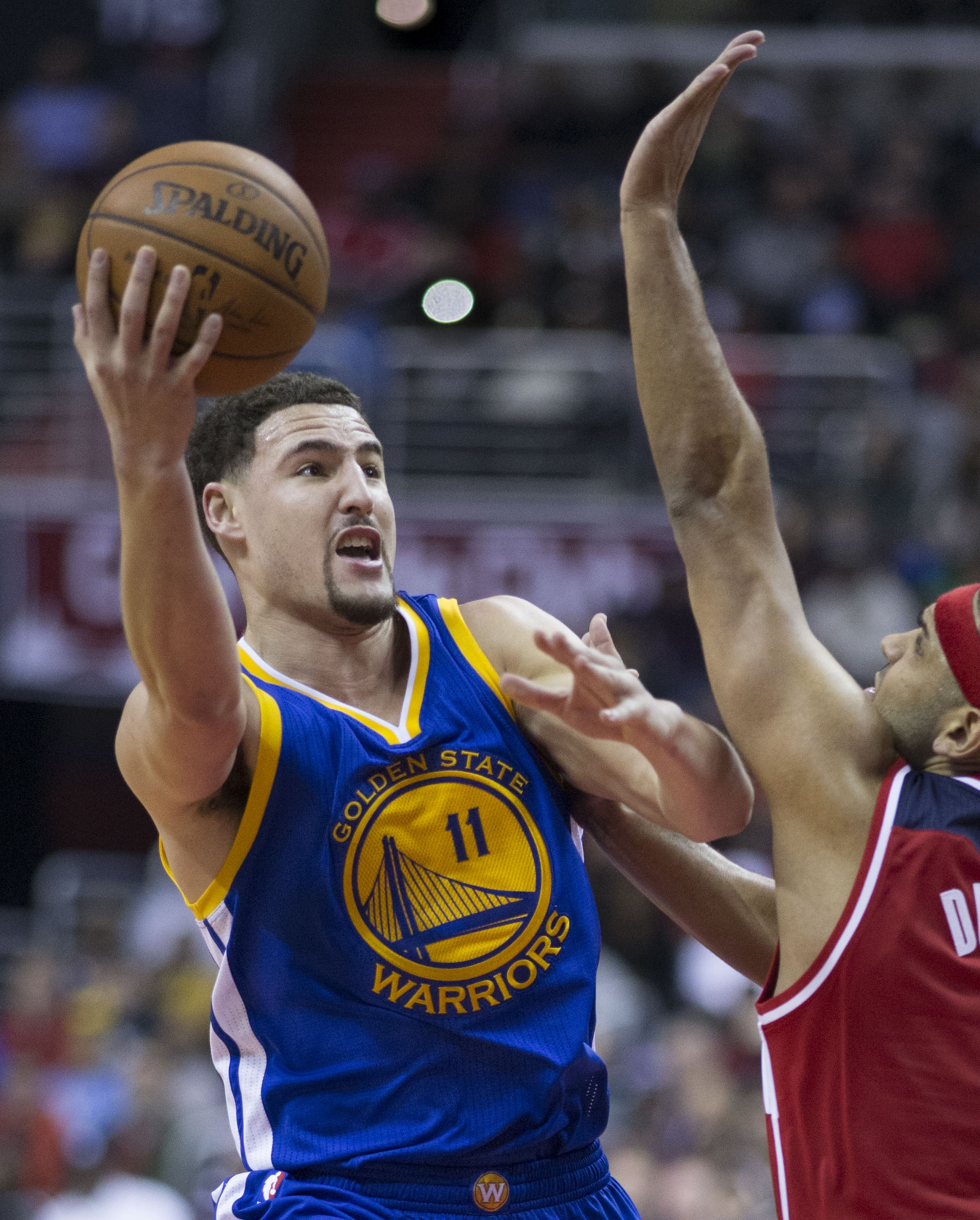
Klay Thompson set an NBA record for most three-pointers made in a game with fourteen.

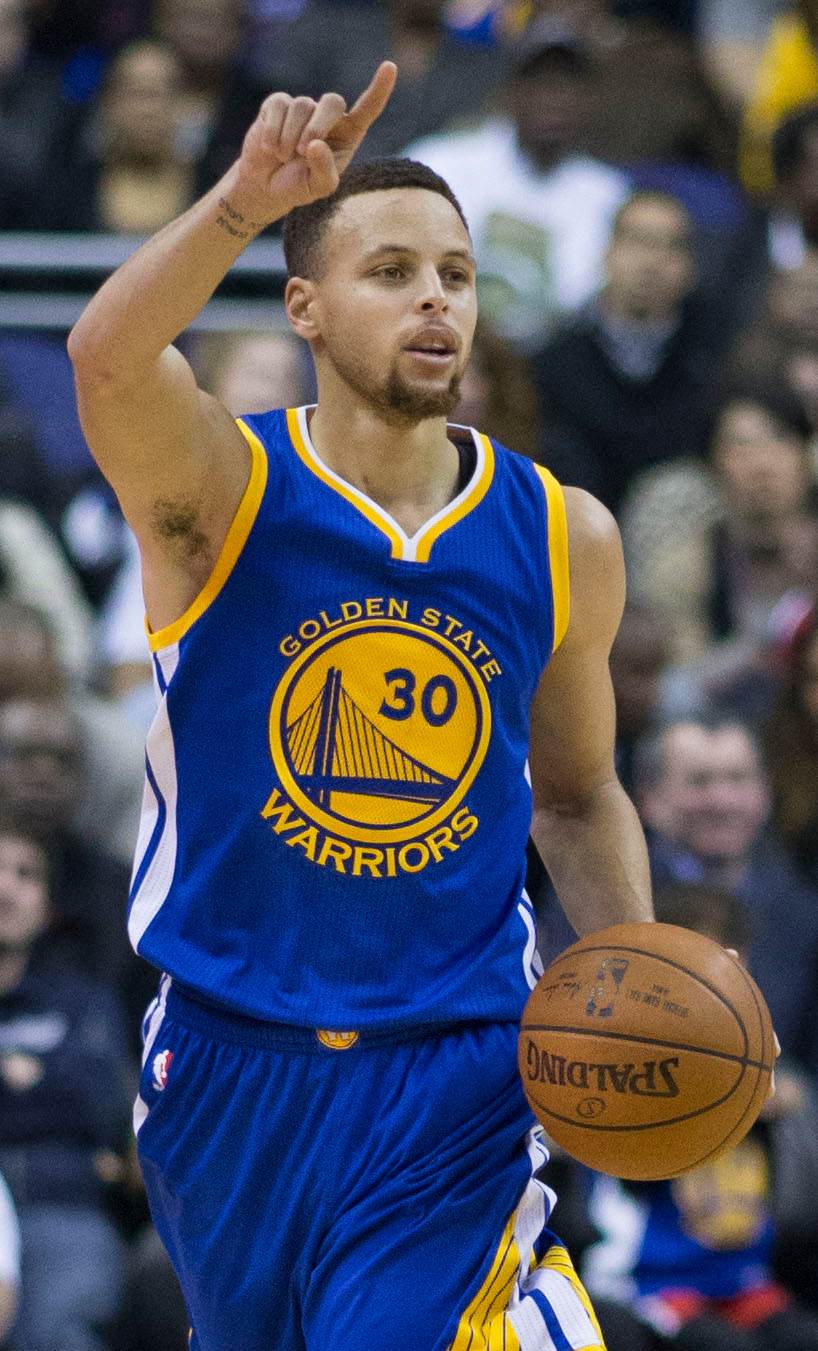
Stephen Curry set the all-time NBA record for most three-pointers made in the playoffs with 470.

=== NBA records ===
As of June 13, 2019

=== Individual ===
==== Regular season ====
- Most three-pointers made in game: 14 (Klay Thompson, vs Chicago Bulls on October 29, 2018
- Most games with 10+ three-pointers in a season: 6, (Stephen Curry, up to and including game against Minnesota Timberwolves on March 29, 2019. He's made 10+ 15 times in his career)
- Most three-pointers made in a half: 10, (Klay Thompson, tied with Chandler Parsons)
- Most three-pointers made without missing: 10, (Klay Thompson, 10 of 10 3FG vs Los Angeles Lakers on January 21, 2019)
- Most consecutive games with at least five three-pointers: 7, (Stephen Curry, first seven games of the season)
- Most games with 11+ three-pointers: 13, (Stephen Curry, up to and including game against Minnesota Timberwolves on March 29, 2019)
- Most two-pointers made in the first four games of the season: 22, (Stephen Curry, broke his own record of 21 in the 2015–16 season)

==== Postseason ====
- Most three-pointers made in the playoffs: 470 (Stephen Curry, surpassed Ray Allen's 385 for the NBA record)
- Most points in a four-game playoff series: 146 (Stephen Curry against Portland Trail Blazers in the Western Conference finals. Previous record of 145 was held by Shaquille O'Neal)
- Most three-pointers made in a four-game playoff series: 26 (Stephen Curry against Portland Trail Blazers in the Western Conference finals. He broke his own record of 22)
- Most consecutive playoff games with a made three-pointer: 112 - ongoing streak (Stephen Curry, has made a three-pointer in every playoff game he's played in)
- Most consecutive playoff games with a made three-pointer at home: 58 - ongoing streak (Stephen Curry)
- Most consecutive playoff games with a made three-pointer on the road: 54 - ongoing streak (Stephen Curry)
- Most points scored in a first half in a playoff game: 38, (Kevin Durant, tied with Charles Barkley)
- First teammates to both have a triple-double in the same postseason game: Draymond Green and Stephen Curry (against Portland Trail Blazers in Game 4)

=== Team ===
==== Regular season ====
- Most points scored in a first quarter: 51, (vs the Denver Nuggets on January 15, 2019)
- Most three-pointers made in a half: 17, (17 of 27 3FG vs Chicago Bulls on October 29, 2018)
- Most combined three-pointers made in a game: 43, (vs New Orleans Pelicans on January 16, 2019. Warriors made 24, Pelicans made 19)

==== Postseason ====
- Most consecutive playoff series with a road win: 23 (surpassed the Miami Heat who had 19. The Warriors have won a game on the road in every series since they played the Denver Nuggets in the first round of the 2012–13 season.)
- Longest unanswered run in an NBA Finals game: 20 (vs Toronto Raptors on June 2, 2019, Game 2 of the 2019 NBA Finals. The Warriors went on a 20–0 run. The streak started at 4.1 seconds left in the 2nd quarter until 6:58 left in the 3rd quarter.)

=== Franchise records ===
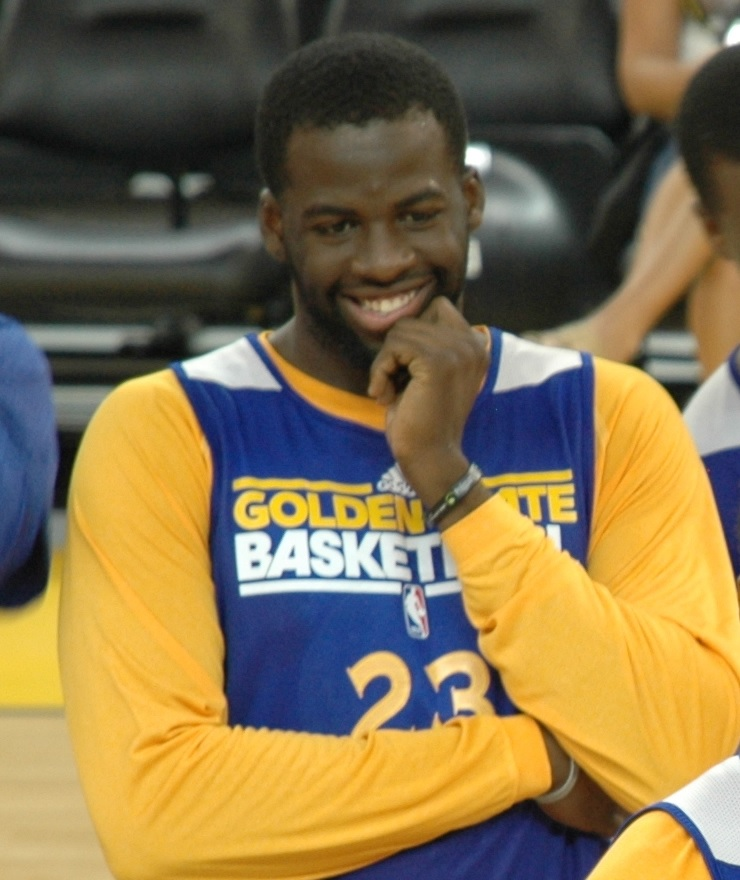
Draymond Green has the most triple-doubles in franchise history, with 22 in the regular season and 10 in the postseason.

=== Individual ===
==== Regular season ====
- Most three-pointers made: 2,483 (Stephen Curry, he's currently third on the all-time career 3-point scoring list)

==== Postseason ====
- Most triple-doubles in the postseason: 10 (Draymond Green. Green is tied fourth all-time for most triple doubles in the playoffs)
- Most playoff games played: 123 (Klay Thompson, missed his first ever playoff game in the NBA Finals, Game 3)

=== Team ===
==== Regular season ====
- Most three-pointers in a game: 24 (twice this season, vs Chicago Bulls on October 29, 2018, and vs New Orleans Pelicans on January 16, 2019
- Most points in a half: 92, vs Chicago Bulls on October 29, 2018. 92 is the second most points in a first half in NBA history, behind the Phoenix Suns 107 in 1990. 92 is the fifth most points in any half in NBA history, again behind the Suns 107
- Most three-pointers in a quarter: 10, (10 of 14 3FG vs the Denver Nuggets on January 15, 2019)
- Most three-pointers made in a season: 1,078
- Most consecutive 50+ win seasons: Six (The Warriors had only reached 50 wins four times in the previous five decades, in 1971–72, 1975–76, 1991–92, and 1993–94)

==== Postseason ====
- Most consecutive NBA Finals appearances: Five (Only the Boston Celtics have appeared in more consecutively in NBA history. They appeared in ten straight between 1957 and 1966)
- Most consecutive Western Conference finals appearances: Five (only the Los Angeles Lakers have appeared in more consecutive Finals, with eight between 1982 and 1989)
- Most consecutive playoff series wins: Nine (longest streak since the Miami Heat won eleven in a row)
- Most consecutive playoff appearances: Seven (The previous record was six, in the team's first six years of existence between 1947 and 1952)

== Standings ==
=== Division ===
| Pacific Division | W | L | PCT | GB | Home | Road | Div | GP |
|---|---|---|---|---|---|---|---|---|
| c – Golden State Warriors | 57 | 25 | .695 | – | 30‍–‍11 | 27‍–‍14 | 13–3 | 82 |
| x – Los Angeles Clippers | 48 | 34 | .585 | 9.0 | 26‍–‍15 | 22‍–‍19 | 11–5 | 82 |
| Sacramento Kings | 39 | 43 | .476 | 18.0 | 24‍–‍17 | 15‍–‍26 | 4–12 | 82 |
| Los Angeles Lakers | 37 | 45 | .451 | 20.0 | 22‍–‍19 | 15‍–‍26 | 9–7 | 82 |
| Phoenix Suns | 19 | 63 | .232 | 38.0 | 12‍–‍29 | 7‍–‍34 | 3–13 | 82 |

=== Conference ===
Western Conference
| # | Team | W | L | PCT | GB | GP |
|---|---|---|---|---|---|---|
| 1 | c – Golden State Warriors * | 57 | 25 | .695 | – | 82 |
| 2 | y – Denver Nuggets * | 54 | 28 | .659 | 3.0 | 82 |
| 3 | x – Portland Trail Blazers | 53 | 29 | .646 | 4.0 | 82 |
| 4 | y – Houston Rockets * | 53 | 29 | .646 | 4.0 | 82 |
| 5 | x – Utah Jazz | 50 | 32 | .610 | 7.0 | 82 |
| 6 | x – Oklahoma City Thunder | 49 | 33 | .598 | 8.0 | 82 |
| 7 | x – San Antonio Spurs | 48 | 34 | .585 | 9.0 | 82 |
| 8 | x – Los Angeles Clippers | 48 | 34 | .585 | 9.0 | 82 |
| 9 | Sacramento Kings | 39 | 43 | .476 | 18.0 | 82 |
| 10 | Los Angeles Lakers | 37 | 45 | .451 | 20.0 | 82 |
| 11 | Minnesota Timberwolves | 36 | 46 | .439 | 21.0 | 82 |
| 12 | Memphis Grizzlies | 33 | 49 | .402 | 24.0 | 82 |
| 13 | New Orleans Pelicans | 33 | 49 | .402 | 24.0 | 82 |
| 14 | Dallas Mavericks | 33 | 49 | .402 | 24.0 | 82 |
| 15 | Phoenix Suns | 19 | 63 | .232 | 38.0 | 82 |

== Game log ==
=== Preseason ===
2018 preseason game log
Total: 1–4 (home: 1–3; road: 0–1)
Preseason: 1–4 (home: 1–3; road: 0–1)

| Game | Date | Team | Score | High points | High rebounds | High assists | Location Attendance | Record |
|---|---|---|---|---|---|---|---|---|
| 1 | September 29 | Minnesota | L 110–114 | Curry (21) | Bell (7) | Green (8) | Oracle Arena; 19,596 | 0–1 |
| 2 | October 5 | Sacramento | W 122–94 | Thompson (30) | Derrickson (7) | Durant (7) | KeyArena; 17,074 | 1–1 |
| 3 | October 8 | Phoenix | L 109–117 | Curry (23) | Jones (8) | Jones, Durant (5) | Oracle Arena; 19,596 | 1–2 |
| 4 | October 10 | @ LA Lakers | L 113–123 | Curry (23) | Durant (12) | Curry (5) | T-Mobile Arena; 1,763 | 1–3 |
| 5 | October 12 | LA Lakers | L 105–119 | Thompson (21) | McKinnie (7) | Green (5) | SAP Center; 18,523 | 1–4 |

2018–19 season schedule

=== Regular season ===
2018–19 game log
Total: 57–25 (home: 30–11; road: 27–14)
October: 8–1 (home: 4–0; road: 4–1)

| Game | Date | Team | Score | High points | High rebounds | High assists | Location Attendance | Record |
|---|---|---|---|---|---|---|---|---|
| 1 | October 16 | Oklahoma City | W 108–100 | Stephen Curry (32) | Draymond Green (13) | Stephen Curry (9) | Oracle Arena; 19,596 | 1–0 |
| 2 | October 19 | @ Utah | W 124–123 | Kevin Durant (38) | Durant, Green (9) | Stephen Curry (8) | Vivint Smart Home Arena; 18,306 | 2–0 |
| 3 | October 21 | @ Denver | L 98–100 | Stephen Curry (30) | Kevin Durant (11) | Kevin Durant (7) | Pepsi Center; 19,520 | 2–1 |
| 4 | October 22 | Phoenix | W 123–103 | Stephen Curry (29) | Alfonzo McKinnie (7) | Curry, Green (8) | Oracle Arena; 19,596 | 3–1 |
| 5 | October 24 | Washington | W 144–122 | Stephen Curry (51) | Kevin Durant (8) | Draymond Green (12) | Oracle Arena; 19,596 | 4–1 |
| 6 | October 26 | @ New York | W 128–100 | Kevin Durant (41) | Kevin Durant (9) | Draymond Green (6) | Madison Square Garden; 19,812 | 5–1 |
| 7 | October 28 | @ Brooklyn | W 120–114 | Stephen Curry (35) | Kevin Durant (8) | Draymond Green (13) | Barclays Center; 17,732 | 6–1 |
| 8 | October 29 | @ Chicago | W 149–124 | Klay Thompson (52) | Alfonzo McKinnie (10) | Draymond Green (11) | United Center; 21,076 | 7–1 |
| 9 | October 31 | New Orleans | W 131–121 | Stephen Curry (37) | Draymond Green (14) | Stephen Curry (9) | Oracle Arena; 19,596 | 8–1 |

November : 7–7 (home: 7–2; road: 0–5)

| Game | Date | Team | Score | High points | High rebounds | High assists | Location Attendance | Record |
|---|---|---|---|---|---|---|---|---|
| 10 | November 2 | Minnesota | W 116–99 | Kevin Durant (33) | Kevin Durant (13) | Draymond Green (11) | Oracle Arena; 19,596 | 9–1 |
| 11 | November 5 | Memphis | W 117–101 | Klay Thompson (27) | Kevon Looney (9) | Stephen Curry (7) | Oracle Arena; 19,596 | 10–1 |
| 12 | November 8 | Milwaukee | L 111–134 | Klay Thompson (24) | Durant, Looney, Bell, McKinnie (5) | Kevin Durant (9) | Oracle Arena; 19,596 | 10–2 |
| 13 | November 10 | Brooklyn | W 116–100 | Kevin Durant (28) | Jordan Bell (8) | Kevin Durant (11) | Oracle Arena; 19,596 | 11–2 |
| 14 | November 12 | @ L.A. Clippers | L 116–121 (OT) | Kevin Durant (33) | Draymond Green (14) | Kevin Durant (10) | Staples Center; 19,068 | 11–3 |
| 15 | November 13 | Atlanta | W 110–103 | Kevin Durant (29) | Jonas Jerebko (13) | Quinn Cook (6) | Oracle Arena; 19,596 | 12–3 |
| 16 | November 15 | @ Houston | L 86–107 | Kevin Durant (20) | Andre Iguodala (6) | Draymond Green (5) | Toyota Center; 18,055 | 12–4 |
| 17 | November 17 | @ Dallas | L 109–112 | Kevin Durant (32) | Jonas Jerebko (10) | Jerebko, Thompson, Livingston, Iguodala (4) | American Airlines Center; 20,260 | 12–5 |
| 18 | November 18 | @ San Antonio | L 92–104 | Kevin Durant (26) | Durant, Jerebko (10) | Kevin Durant (6) | AT&T Center; 18,354 | 12–6 |
| 19 | November 21 | Oklahoma City | L 95–123 | Thompson, Durant (27) | Kevin Durant (14) | Quinn Cook (6) | Oracle Arena; 19,596 | 12–7 |
| 20 | November 23 | Portland | W 125–97 | Kevin Durant (32) | Durant, Bell (8) | Kevin Durant (7) | Oracle Arena; 19,596 | 13–7 |
| 21 | November 24 | Sacramento | W 117–116 | Kevin Durant (44) | Kevin Durant (13) | Kevin Durant (7) | Oracle Arena; 19,596 | 14–7 |
| 22 | November 26 | Orlando | W 116–110 | Kevin Durant (49) | Durant, Looney, Cook (6) | Kevin Durant (9) | Oracle Arena; 19,596 | 15–7 |
| 23 | November 29 | @ Toronto | L 128–131 (OT) | Kevin Durant (51) | Kevin Durant (11) | Shaun Livingston (7) | Scotiabank Arena; 19,800 | 15–8 |

December : 10–5 (home: 4–3; road: 6–2)

| Game | Date | Team | Score | High points | High rebounds | High assists | Location Attendance | Record |
|---|---|---|---|---|---|---|---|---|
| 24 | December 1 | @ Detroit | L 102–111 | Kevin Durant (28) | Klay Thompson (8) | Kevin Durant (7) | Little Caesars Arena; 20,332 | 15–9 |
| 25 | December 3 | @ Atlanta | W 128–111 | Stephen Curry (30) | Klay Thompson (9) | Kevin Durant (8) | State Farm Arena; 16,631 | 16–9 |
| 26 | December 5 | @ Cleveland | W 129–105 | Stephen Curry (30) | Kevin Durant (10) | Kevin Durant (9) | Quicken Loans Arena; 19,432 | 17–9 |
| 27 | December 7 | @ Milwaukee | W 105–95 | Thompson, Curry (20) | Durant, Iguodala (8) | Stephen Curry (8) | Fiserv Forum; 17,852 | 18–9 |
| 28 | December 10 | Minnesota | W 116–108 | Stephen Curry (38) | Draymond Green (10) | Draymond Green (7) | Oracle Arena; 19,596 | 19–9 |
| 29 | December 12 | Toronto | L 93–113 | Kevin Durant (30) | Durant, Bell (7) | Draymond Green (7) | Oracle Arena; 19,596 | 19–10 |
| 30 | December 14 | @ Sacramento | W 130–125 | Stephen Curry (35) | Draymond Green (14) | Draymond Green (10) | Golden 1 Center; 17,583 | 20–10 |
| 31 | December 17 | Memphis | W 110–93 | Kevin Durant (23) | Curry, Green (7) | Durant, Green (5) | Oracle Arena; 19,596 | 21–10 |
| 32 | December 19 | @ Utah | L 103–108 | Stephen Curry (32) | Draymond Green (12) | Shaun Livingston (5) | Vivint Smart Home Arena; 18,306 | 21–11 |
| 33 | December 22 | Dallas | W 120–116 | Kevin Durant (29) | Kevin Durant (12) | Kevin Durant (8) | Oracle Arena; 19,596 | 22–11 |
| 34 | December 23 | L.A. Clippers | W 129–127 | Stephen Curry (42) | Kevin Durant (12) | Kevin Durant (6) | Oracle Arena; 19,596 | 23–11 |
| 35 | December 25 | L.A. Lakers | L 101–127 | Andre Iguodala (23) | Kevin Durant (7) | Kevin Durant (7) | Oracle Arena; 19,596 | 23–12 |
| 36 | December 27 | Portland | L 109–110 (OT) | Stephen Curry (29) | Draymond Green (11) | Kevin Durant (10) | Oracle Arena; 19,596 | 23–13 |
| 37 | December 29 | @ Portland | W 115–105 | Klay Thompson (32) | Draymond Green (9) | Stephen Curry (8) | Moda Center; 19,797 | 24–13 |
| 38 | December 31 | @ Phoenix | W 132–109 | Stephen Curry (34) | Stephen Curry (9) | Draymond Green (7) | Talking Stick Resort Arena; 16,906 | 25–13 |

January : 11–2 (home: 3–2; road: 8–0)

| Game | Date | Team | Score | High points | High rebounds | High assists | Location Attendance | Record |
|---|---|---|---|---|---|---|---|---|
| 39 | January 3 | Houston | L 134–135 (OT) | Stephen Curry (35) | Draymond Green (11) | Draymond Green (8) | Oracle Arena; 19,596 | 25–14 |
| 40 | January 5 | @ Sacramento | W 127–123 | Stephen Curry (42) | Jonas Jerebko (8) | Kevin Durant (9) | Golden 1 Center; 17,583 | 26–14 |
| 41 | January 8 | New York | W 122–95 | Klay Thompson (43) | Draymond Green (11) | Stephen Curry (14) | Oracle Arena; 19,596 | 27–14 |
| 42 | January 11 | Chicago | W 146–109 | Klay Thompson (30) | Green, Looney (7) | Stephen Curry (8) | Oracle Arena; 19,596 | 28–14 |
| 43 | January 13 | @ Dallas | W 119–114 | Stephen Curry (48) | Jonas Jerebko (8) | Andre Iguodala (6) | American Airlines Center; 20,340 | 29–14 |
| 44 | January 15 | @ Denver | W 142–111 | Curry, Thompson (31) | Kevon Looney (12) | Draymond Green (13) | Pepsi Center; 19,896 | 30–14 |
| 45 | January 16 | New Orleans | W 147–140 | Stephen Curry (41) | Kevin Durant (15) | Draymond Green (14) | Oracle Arena; 19,596 | 31–14 |
| 46 | January 18 | @ L.A. Clippers | W 112–94 | Stephen Curry (28) | Draymond Green (8) | Draymond Green (9) | Staples Center; 19,068 | 32–14 |
| 47 | January 21 | @ L.A. Lakers | W 130–111 | Klay Thompson (44) | DeMarcus Cousins (9) | Stephen Curry (12) | Staples Center; 18,997 | 33–14 |
| 48 | January 24 | @ Washington | W 126–118 | Stephen Curry (38) | Draymond Green (15) | Draymond Green (7) | Capital One Arena; 20,409 | 34–14 |
| 49 | January 26 | @ Boston | W 115–111 | Kevin Durant (33) | Draymond Green (11) | Draymond Green (8) | TD Garden; 18,624 | 35–14 |
| 50 | January 28 | @ Indiana | W 132–100 | Stephen Curry (26) | Cousins, Curry, Iguodala, Cook (6) | Kevin Durant (7) | Bankers Life Fieldhouse; 17,923 | 36–14 |
| 51 | January 31 | Philadelphia | L 104–113 | Stephen Curry (41) | Draymond Green (8) | Draymond Green (10) | Oracle Arena; 19,596 | 36–15 |

February : 7–4 (home: 5–1; road: 2–3)

| Game | Date | Team | Score | High points | High rebounds | High assists | Location Attendance | Record |
|---|---|---|---|---|---|---|---|---|
| 52 | February 2 | L.A. Lakers | W 115–101 | Klay Thompson (28) | DeMarcus Cousins (10) | Kevin Durant (11) | Oracle Arena; 19,596 | 37–15 |
| 53 | February 6 | San Antonio | W 141–102 | Klay Thompson (26) | Kevin Durant (8) | Kevin Durant (9) | Oracle Arena; 19,596 | 38–15 |
| 54 | February 8 | @ Phoenix | W 117–107 | Klay Thompson (25) | Kevin Durant (8) | Stephen Curry (7) | Talking Stick Resort Arena; 17,081 | 39–15 |
| 55 | February 10 | Miami | W 120–118 | Kevin Durant (39) | Draymond Green (7) | Draymond Green (14) | Oracle Arena; 19,596 | 40–15 |
| 56 | February 12 | Utah | W 115–108 | Kevin Durant (28) | DeMarcus Cousins (10) | Kevin Durant (7) | Oracle Arena; 19,596 | 41–15 |
| 57 | February 13 | @ Portland | L 107–129 | Durant, Curry (32) | Jordan Bell (9) | Klay Thompson (8) | Moda Center; 19,549 | 41–16 |
All-Star Break
| 58 | February 21 | Sacramento | W 125–123 | Stephen Curry (36) | DeMarcus Cousins (10) | Demarcus Cousins (14) | Oracle Arena; 19,596 | 42–16 |
| 59 | February 23 | Houston | L 112–118 | Kevin Durant (29) | Demarcus Cousins (14) | Stephen Curry (7) | Oracle Arena; 19,596 | 42–17 |
| 60 | February 25 | @ Charlotte | W 121–110 | Klay Thompson (26) | Demarcus Cousins (11) | Demarcus Cousins (10) | Spectrum Center; 19,419 | 43–17 |
| 61 | February 27 | @ Miami | L 125–126 | Klay Thompson (36) | Curry, Bell, Looney (7) | Kevin Durant (5) | American Airlines Arena; 19,647 | 43–18 |
| 62 | February 28 | @ Orlando | L 96–103 | Stephen Curry (33) | Demarcus Cousins (11) | Stephen Curry (6) | Amway Center; 18,846 | 43–19 |

March : 9–5 (home: 4–3; road: 5–2)

| Game | Date | Team | Score | High points | High rebounds | High assists | Location Attendance | Record |
|---|---|---|---|---|---|---|---|---|
| 63 | March 2 | @ Philadelphia | W 120–117 | Kevin Durant (34) | Draymond Green (9) | Draymond Green (10) | Wells Fargo Center; 20,624 | 44–19 |
| 64 | March 5 | Boston | L 95–128 | Stephen Curry (23) | Demarcus Cousins (9) | Draymond Green (5) | Oracle Arena; 19,596 | 44–20 |
| 65 | March 8 | Denver | W 122–105 | Klay Thompson (39) | Draymond Green (10) | Durant, Cousins (6) | Oracle Arena; 19,596 | 45–20 |
| 66 | March 10 | Phoenix | L 111–115 | Klay Thompson (28) | Draymond Green (11) | Green, Curry (8) | Oracle Arena; 19,596 | 45–21 |
| 67 | March 13 | @ Houston | W 106–104 | Klay Thompson (30) | Demarcus Cousins (8) | Demarcus Cousins (7) | Toyota Center; 18,122 | 46–21 |
| 68 | March 16 | @ Oklahoma City | W 110–88 | Stephen Curry (33) | Thompson, Green, Cousins (8) | Green, Cousins (6) | Chesapeake Energy Arena; 18,203 | 47–21 |
| 69 | March 18 | @ San Antonio | L 105–111 | Stephen Curry (25) | Bogut, Curry (7) | Stephen Curry (8) | AT&T Center; 18,354 | 47–22 |
| 70 | March 19 | @ Minnesota | W 117–107 | Stephen Curry (36) | Draymond Green (10) | Green, Durant (9) | Target Center; 17,964 | 48–22 |
| 71 | March 21 | Indiana | W 112–89 | Klay Thompson (18) | Demarcus Cousins (11) | Stephen Curry (7) | Oracle Arena; 19,596 | 49–22 |
| 72 | March 23 | Dallas | L 91–126 | Kevin Durant (25) | Cousins, Cook (6) | Quinn Cook (7) | Oracle Arena; 19,596 | 49–23 |
| 73 | March 24 | Detroit | W 121–114 | Stephen Curry (26) | Stephen Curry (9) | Kevin Durant (11) | Oracle Arena; 19,596 | 50–23 |
| 74 | March 27 | @ Memphis | W 118–103 | Stephen Curry (28) | Stephen Curry (10) | Stephen Curry (7) | FedExForum; 17,794 | 51–23 |
| 75 | March 29 | @ Minnesota | L 130–131 (OT) | Stephen Curry (37) | Kevin Durant (12) | Kevin Durant (7) | Target Center; 18,978 | 51–24 |
| 76 | March 31 | Charlotte | W 137–90 | Stephen Curry (25) | Andrew Bogut (8) | Green, Durant (9) | Oracle Arena; 19,596 | 52–24 |

April : 5–1 (home: 3–0; road: 2–1)

| Game | Date | Team | Score | High points | High rebounds | High assists | Location Attendance | Record |
|---|---|---|---|---|---|---|---|---|
| 77 | April 2 | Denver | W 116–102 | Demarcus Cousins (25) | Demarcus Cousins (12) | Draymond Green (9) | Oracle Arena; 19,596 | 53–24 |
| 78 | April 4 | @ L.A. Lakers | W 108–90 | Demarcus Cousins (21) | Cousins, Curry (10) | Kevin Durant (8) | Staples Center; 18,997 | 54–24 |
| 79 | April 5 | Cleveland | W 120–114 | Stephen Curry (40) | Draymond Green (8) | Kevin Durant (8) | Oracle Arena; 19,596 | 55–24 |
| 80 | April 7 | L.A. Clippers | W 131–104 | Stephen Curry (27) | Draymond Green (10) | Draymond Green (9) | Oracle Arena; 19,596 | 56–24 |
| 81 | April 9 | @ New Orleans | W 112–103 | Demarcus Cousins (21) | Demarcus Cousins (12) | Demarcus Cousins (6) | Smoothie King Center; 17,090 | 57–24 |
| 82 | April 10 | @ Memphis | L 117–132 | Kevin Durant (21) | Jordan Bell (8) | Kevin Durant (6) | FedExForum; 17,794 | 57–25 |

2018–19 season schedule

=== Playoffs ===
2019 playoff game log
Total: 14–8 (home: 6–5; road: 8–3)
First Round: 4–2 (home: 1–2; road: 3–0)

| Game | Date | Team | Score | High points | High rebounds | High assists | Location Attendance | Series |
|---|---|---|---|---|---|---|---|---|
| 1 | April 13 | L.A. Clippers | W 121–104 | Stephen Curry (38) | Stephen Curry (15) | Curry, Green (7) | Oracle Arena; 19,596 | 1–0 |
| 2 | April 15 | L.A. Clippers | L 131–135 | Stephen Curry (29) | Andrew Bogut (9) | Draymond Green (9) | Oracle Arena; 19,596 | 1–1 |
| 3 | April 18 | @ L.A. Clippers | W 132–105 | Kevin Durant (38) | Andrew Bogut (14) | Draymond Green (10) | Staples Center; 19,068 | 2–1 |
| 4 | April 21 | @ L.A. Clippers | W 113–105 | Kevin Durant (33) | Bogut, Curry (10) | Stephen Curry (7) | Staples Center; 19,068 | 3–1 |
| 5 | April 24 | L.A. Clippers | L 121–129 | Kevin Durant (45) | Green, Looney (7) | Andre Iguodala (8) | Oracle Arena; 19,596 | 3–2 |
| 6 | April 26 | @ L.A. Clippers | W 129–110 | Kevin Durant (50) | Draymond Green (14) | Draymond Green (10) | Staples Center; 19,068 | 4–2 |

Conference Semifinals: 4–2 (home: 3–0; road: 1–2)

| Game | Date | Team | Score | High points | High rebounds | High assists | Location Attendance | Series |
|---|---|---|---|---|---|---|---|---|
| 1 | April 28 | Houston | W 104–100 | Kevin Durant (35) | Draymond Green (9) | Draymond Green (9) | Oracle Arena; 19,596 | 1–0 |
| 2 | April 30 | Houston | W 115–109 | Kevin Durant (29) | Draymond Green (12) | Draymond Green (7) | Oracle Arena; 19,596 | 2–0 |
| 3 | May 4 | @ Houston | L 121–126 (OT) | Kevin Durant (46) | Draymond Green (11) | Draymond Green (10) | Toyota Center; 18,169 | 2–1 |
| 4 | May 6 | @ Houston | L 108–112 | Kevin Durant (34) | Draymond Green (10) | Stephen Curry (8) | Toyota Center; 18,169 | 2–2 |
| 5 | May 8 | Houston | W 104–99 | Klay Thompson (27) | Draymond Green (12) | Draymond Green (11) | Oracle Arena; 19,596 | 3–2 |
| 6 | May 10 | @ Houston | W 118–113 | Stephen Curry (33) | Draymond Green (10) | Draymond Green (7) | Toyota Center; 18,169 | 4–2 |

Conference Finals: 4–0 (home: 2–0; road: 2–0)

| Game | Date | Team | Score | High points | High rebounds | High assists | Location Attendance | Series |
|---|---|---|---|---|---|---|---|---|
| 1 | May 14 | Portland | W 116–94 | Stephen Curry (36) | Draymond Green (10) | Stephen Curry (7) | Oracle Arena; 19,596 | 1–0 |
| 2 | May 16 | Portland | W 114–111 | Stephen Curry (37) | Draymond Green (10) | Stephen Curry (8) | Oracle Arena; 19,596 | 2–0 |
| 3 | May 18 | @ Portland | W 110–99 | Stephen Curry (36) | Draymond Green (13) | Draymond Green (12) | Moda Center; 20,214 | 3–0 |
| 4 | May 20 | @ Portland | W 119–117 (OT) | Stephen Curry (37) | Green, Looney (14) | Green, Curry (11) | Moda Center; 20,064 | 4–0 |

NBA Finals: 2–4 (home: 0–3; road: 2–1)

| Game | Date | Team | Score | High points | High rebounds | High assists | Location Attendance | Series |
|---|---|---|---|---|---|---|---|---|
| 1 | May 30 | @ Toronto | L 109–118 | Stephen Curry (34) | Draymond Green (10) | Draymond Green (10) | Scotiabank Arena; 19,983 | 0–1 |
| 2 | June 2 | @ Toronto | W 109–104 | Klay Thompson (25) | Cousins, Green (10) | Draymond Green (9) | Scotiabank Arena; 20,014 | 1–1 |
| 3 | June 5 | Toronto | L 109–123 | Stephen Curry (47) | Stephen Curry (8) | Stephen Curry (7) | Oracle Arena; 19,596 | 1–2 |
| 4 | June 7 | Toronto | L 92–105 | Klay Thompson (28) | Draymond Green (9) | Draymond Green (12) | Oracle Arena; 19,596 | 1–3 |
| 5 | June 10 | @ Toronto | W 106–105 | Stephen Curry (31) | Draymond Green (10) | Draymond Green (8) | Scotiabank Arena; 20,144 | 2–3 |
| 6 | June 13 | Toronto | L 110–114 | Klay Thompson (30) | Draymond Green (19) | Draymond Green (13) | Oracle Arena; 19,596 | 2–4 |

== Player statistics ==
=== Regular season ===
| Player | Pos. | GP | GS | MP | Reb. | Ast. | Stl. | Blk. | Pts. |
|---|---|---|---|---|---|---|---|---|---|
| Jordan Bell | C | 68 | 3 | 788 | 184 | 76 | 20 | 51 | 223 |
| Andrew Bogut^{≠} | C | 11 | 5 | 134 | 55 | 11 | 3 | 8 | 39 |
| Quinn Cook | PG | 74 | 10 | 1,059 | 157 | 116 | 20 | 3 | 509 |
| DeMarcus Cousins | C | 30 | 30 | 771 | 247 | 107 | 40 | 44 | 488 |
| Stephen Curry | PG | 69 | 69 | 2,331 | 369 | 361 | 92 | 25 | 1,881 |
| Marcus Derrickson | PF | 11 | 0 | 67 | 13 | 1 | 0 | 1 | 46 |
| Kevin Durant | SF | 78 | 78 | 2,702 | 497 | 457 | 58 | 84 | 2,027 |
| Jacob Evans | SG | 30 | 1 | 204 | 25 | 23 | 5 | 3 | 40 |
| Draymond Green | PF | 66 | 66 | 2,065 | 481 | 454 | 95 | 70 | 486 |
| Andre Iguodala | SF | 68 | 13 | 1,578 | 252 | 216 | 61 | 51 | 389 |
| Jonas Jerebko | PF | 73 | 6 | 1,218 | 288 | 96 | 27 | 18 | 459 |
| Damian Jones | C | 24 | 22 | 410 | 75 | 28 | 12 | 25 | 130 |
| Damion Lee | SG | 32 | 0 | 375 | 64 | 13 | 13 | 0 | 158 |
| Shaun Livingston | PG | 64 | 0 | 967 | 117 | 114 | 31 | 27 | 258 |
| Kevon Looney | C | 80 | 24 | 1,481 | 417 | 123 | 46 | 53 | 500 |
| Alfonzo McKinnie | SF | 72 | 5 | 1,003 | 247 | 31 | 18 | 15 | 337 |
| Klay Thompson | SG | 78 | 78 | 2,652 | 299 | 186 | 84 | 47 | 1,680 |

After all games.
^{‡}Waived during the season
^{†}Traded during the season
^{≠}Acquired during the season

=== Playoffs ===
| Player | Pos. | GP | GS | MP | Reb. | Ast. | Stl. | Blk. | Pts. |
|---|---|---|---|---|---|---|---|---|---|
| Jordan Bell | C | 15 | 2 | 106 | 19 | 11 | 4 | 7 | 41 |
| Andrew Bogut | C | 19 | 6 | 179 | 74 | 21 | 5 | 6 | 52 |
| Quinn Cook | PG | 17 | 0 | 193 | 18 | 12 | 3 | 1 | 71 |
| DeMarcus Cousins | C | 8 | 5 | 133 | 39 | 19 | 5 | 6 | 61 |
| Stephen Curry | PG | 22 | 22 | 846 | 132 | 126 | 24 | 4 | 620 |
| Kevin Durant | SF | 12 | 12 | 442 | 59 | 54 | 13 | 12 | 387 |
| Jacob Evans | SG | 7 | 0 | 18 | 1 | 1 | 0 | 0 | 5 |
| Draymond Green | PF | 22 | 22 | 851 | 223 | 187 | 32 | 33 | 292 |
| Andre Iguodala | SF | 21 | 15 | 629 | 91 | 83 | 24 | 23 | 206 |
| Jonas Jerebko | PF | 16 | 0 | 121 | 34 | 12 | 1 | 2 | 34 |
| Damian Jones | C | 4 | 1 | 8 | 2 | 0 | 0 | 0 | 3 |
| Shaun Livingston | PG | 22 | 2 | 322 | 31 | 31 | 10 | 4 | 89 |
| Kevon Looney | C | 21 | 1 | 432 | 94 | 20 | 12 | 11 | 149 |
| Alfonzo McKinnie | SF | 22 | 1 | 235 | 50 | 4 | 2 | 1 | 66 |
| Klay Thompson | SG | 21 | 21 | 818 | 86 | 44 | 28 | 15 | 435 |

== Transactions ==
=== Free agency ===
==== Re-signed ====
| Player | Signed |
|---|---|
| (United States) Kevin Durant | 2-year contract worth $61.5 million |
| (United States) Kevon Looney | 1-year contract worth $1.5 million |

==== Additions ====
| Player | Signed | Former team |
|---|---|---|
| (United States) DeMarcus Cousins | 1-year contract worth $5.3 million | New Orleans Pelicans |
| (Sweden) Jonas Jerebko | 1-year contract worth $1.5 million | Utah Jazz |
| (United States) Damion Lee | Two-way contract | Atlanta Hawks |
| (United States) Marcus Derrickson | Two-way contract | Georgetown Hoyas (Undrafted) |
| (United States) Alfonzo McKinnie | 2-year contract worth $2.7 million | Toronto Raptors |
| (Australia) Andrew Bogut | 1-year contract worth $486,892 | Sydney Kings (Australia) |

==== Subtractions ====
| Player | Reason left | New team |
|---|---|---|
| (Canada) Chris Boucher | Waived | Toronto Raptors |
| (United States) JaVale McGee | 1-year contract worth $2.4 million | Los Angeles Lakers |
| (Israel) Omri Casspi | 1-year contract worth $2.1 million | Memphis Grizzlies |
| (Georgia (country)) Zaza Pachulia | 1-year contract worth $2.4 million | Detroit Pistons |
| (United States) David West | NBA Retirement | |
| (United States) Nick Young | 1-year contract worth $1.6 million | Denver Nuggets |
| (United States) Patrick McCaw | 2-year contract worth $6 million | Cleveland Cavaliers |

== Awards ==
| Recipient | Award | Date awarded | Ref. |
|---|---|---|---|
| (United States) Stephen Curry | Western Conference Player of the Week | October 22–28 | |
| (United States) Stephen Curry | Western Conference Player of the Week | December 3–9 | |
| (United States) Steve Kerr | Western Conference Coach of the Month | January | |
