= Quinn Cook =

American basketball player (born 1993)

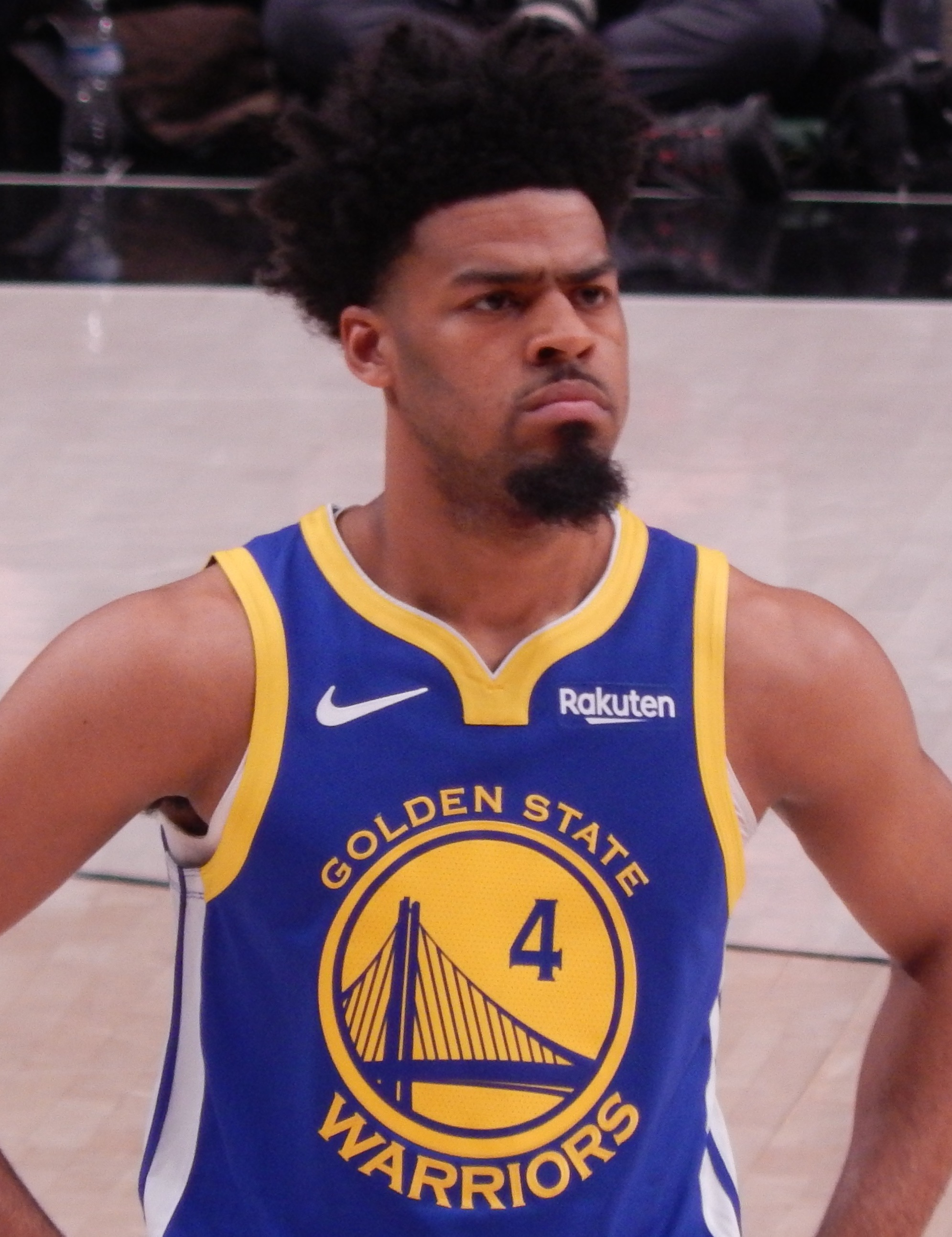
- Cook with the Golden State Warriors in 2019

Free agent
- Position: Point guard

Personal information
- Born: March 23, 1993 (age 33) Washington, D.C., U.S.
- Listed height: 6 ft 2 in (1.88 m)
- Listed weight: 180 lb (82 kg)

Career information
- High school: DeMatha Catholic (Hyattsville, Maryland); Oak Hill Academy (Mouth of Wilson, Virginia)
- College: Duke (2011–2015)
- NBA draft: 2015: undrafted
- Playing career: 2015–present

Career history
- 2015–2017: Canton Charge
- 2017: Dallas Mavericks
- 2017: New Orleans Pelicans
- 2017–2019: Golden State Warriors
- 2017–2018: →Santa Cruz Warriors
- 2019–2021: Los Angeles Lakers
- 2021: Cleveland Cavaliers
- 2021: Lokomotiv Kuban
- 2022: Stockton Kings
- 2022–2023: Zhejiang Lions
- 2024: Gigantes de Carolina
- 2024: Cangrejeros de Santurce
- 2024: Al-Ula
- 2025: Fujian Sturgeons

Career highlights
- 2× NBA champion (2018, 2020); 2× NBA D-League All-Star (2016, 2017); NBA D-League All-Star Game MVP (2017); 2× First-team All-NBA G League (2017, 2018); Third-team All-NBA D-League (2016); NBA D-League Rookie of the Year (2016); NBA D-League All-Rookie Team (2016); 50-40-90 Club (2017); NCAA champion (2015); Second-team All-American – SN (2015); Second-team All-ACC (2015); Third-team All-ACC (2013); McDonald's All-American (2011)
- Stats at NBA.com
- Stats at Basketball Reference
Medals
Men’s basketball
Representing United States
FIBA U17 World Championship
Gold medal – first place	2010 Germany
FIBA Americas U16 World Championship
Gold medal – first place	2009 Argentina

Quinn Alexander Cook (born March 23, 1993) is an American professional basketball player who last played for the Fujian Sturgeons of the Chinese Basketball Association (CBA). He played college basketball for the Duke Blue Devils and was one of the top-rated basketball recruits in the class of 2011. Cook won the 2015 NCAA national championship with Duke, and won two NBA championships, one with the Golden State Warriors in 2018 and one with the Los Angeles Lakers in 2020. He has also played for the Dallas Mavericks, New Orleans Pelicans, and Cleveland Cavaliers.

== High school career ==
Cook started his high school career at DeMatha Catholic High School in Hyattsville, Maryland. Cook played his freshman, sophomore, and junior, seasons at DeMatha. During Cook's career at DeMatha, the Stags had an 85–18 record and finished as the number one ranked team in the state of Maryland during Cook's junior season.

During the summer prior to his senior season, Cook announced that he would be transferring to Oak Hill Academy in Mouth of Wilson, Virginia.

Following his junior season, Cook was named the Washington Post All-Met Player of the Year, becoming the first junior in 30 years to receive the award and was the only junior to be named 2010 All-Met first team. Cook was also named to the Washington Post 2009 All-Met third team, the only sophomore to be listed among the ‘09 All-Met teams.

Cook was invited to play in the fifth annual Boost Mobile Elite 24 game prior to his senior season, joining future Duke teammates Austin Rivers, Alex Murphy, and Michael Gbinije in the game.

During Cook's senior season at Oak Hill Academy, he led the Warriors to a 31–4 record, averaging 19.1 points, 10.9 assists, and 2.5 steals. After the season, Cook was named a Second Team All-American by Maxpreps and played in the 2011 McDonald's All-American Game.

=== College recruitment ===
College recruiting
Name	Hometown	School	Height	Weight	Commit date
Quinn Cook; PG	Washington D.C.	Oak Hill Academy	6 ft 0 in (1.83 m)	180 lb (82 kg)	Nov 4, 2010
Quinn Cook; PG	Recruit ratings: Scout: Rivals: (96)				

Cook signed his letter of intent to play basketball at Duke University on November 4, 2010; his announcement was broadcast live on ESPNU. Cook chose Duke over Villanova, UCLA, and North Carolina. When asked why he decided to attend Duke, Cook stated, "The reason I chose Duke is because of Coach K."

Cook was ranked the #38 player by ESPNU, the #38 player by Rivals.com, and the #37 player by Scout.com coming out of high school.

Cook was a part of a five-player recruiting class for Duke in 2011, which also included Austin Rivers, Alex Murphy, Marshall Plumlee and Michael Gbinije. Duke's 2011 class was the second-best recruiting class in the entire country according to ESPNU.

== College career ==
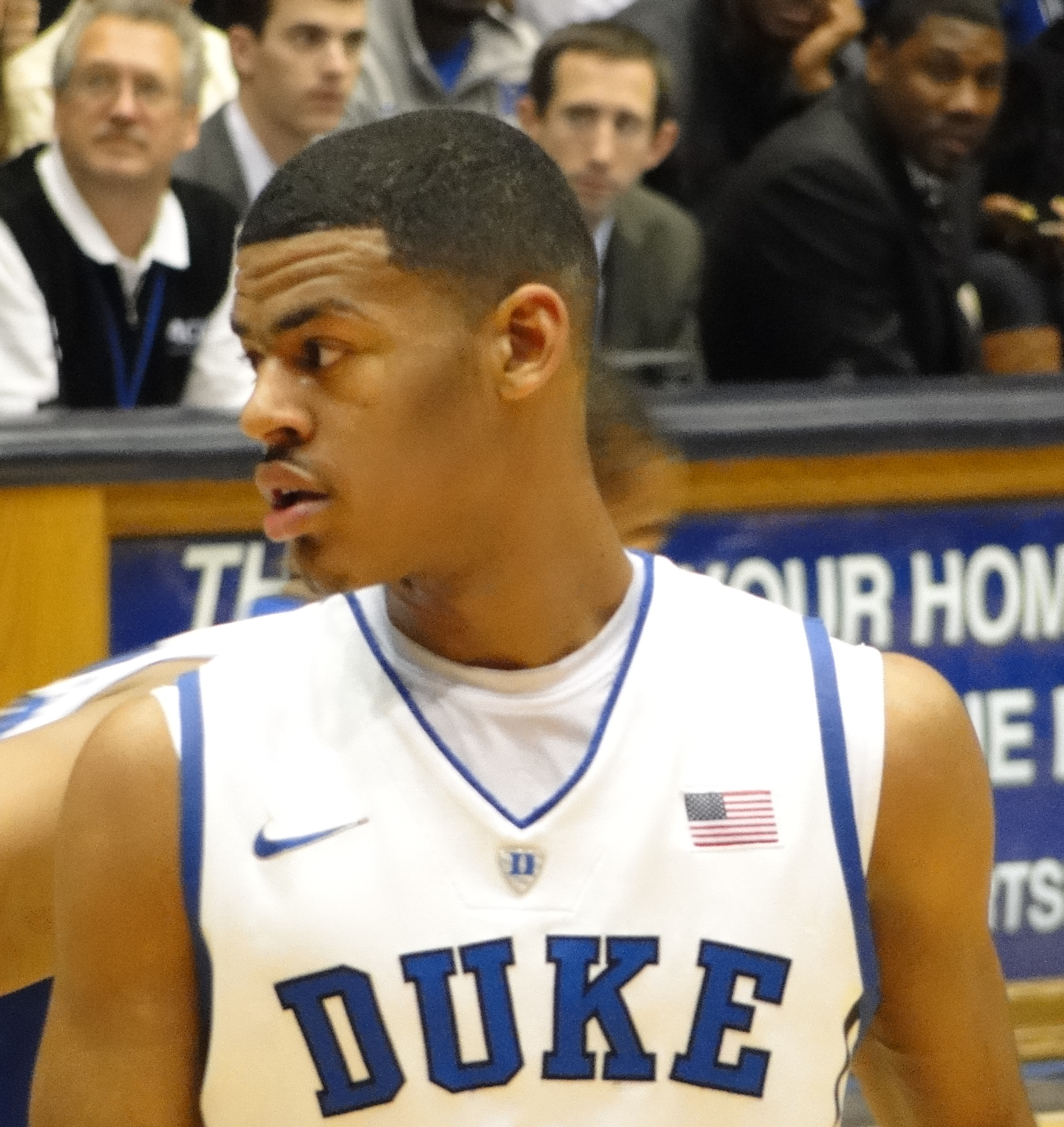
Cook in 2011

Although Duke traveled to China and Dubai during the summer prior to his freshman season, Cook was forced to sit out all four exhibition games due to a lingering knee injury that he suffered during the summer before his freshman year. Cook's debut with the Blue Devils was October 14, 2011, at Duke's annual Countdown to Craziness, he recorded seven points and two assists in his first game as a Blue Devil. Cook's career high during his freshman season was 14 points, which came against UNC Greensboro on December 19, 2011.

Cook was a member of the 2015 NCAA national champion Duke team, averaging 15.3 points and 2.6 assists per game.

== Professional career ==
=== Canton Charge (2015–2017) ===
After going undrafted in the 2015 NBA draft, Cook joined the Oklahoma City Thunder for the Orlando Summer League and the Cleveland Cavaliers for the Las Vegas Summer League.

In September 2015, Cook signed with the Cavaliers, but was waived on October 24 after appearing in six preseason games. Six days later, he was acquired by the Canton Charge of the NBA Development League as an affiliate player of the Cavaliers. On November 14, Cook made his professional debut in a 106–99 loss to the Maine Red Claws, recording 15 points, a rebound, an assist, and a steal in 36 minutes. On February 5, 2016, Cook was named in the East All-Star team for the 2016 NBA D-League All-Star Game as a replacement for the injured DeAndre Liggins. On April 11, Cook was named Rookie of the Year after averaging 19.6 points and 5.4 assists to go along with 3.9 rebounds in 43 games while shooting 47 percent from the field and connecting on a team-high 86 three-pointers. At the season's end, he was named to the All-NBA D-League Third Team and the All-Rookie Team.

In July 2016, Cook joined the NBA D-League Select Team for the 2016 NBA Summer League. On September 24, 2016, he signed with the New Orleans Pelicans, but was waived on October 22 after appearing in three preseason games. On November 1, Cook was reacquired by the Canton Charge. On February 18, 2017, he was named the MVP of the 2017 D-League All-Star Game at the Mercedes-Benz Superdome after recording an 18-point, 12-assist double-double.

=== Dallas Mavericks (2017) ===
On February 26, 2017, Cook signed a 10-day contract with the Dallas Mavericks. He made his NBA debut the following day, recording two points, two rebounds, and two assists in 17 minutes off the bench, in a 96–89 victory over the Miami Heat. On March 7, Cook had his best game as a Maverick, scoring 10 points in a 122–111 victory over the Los Angeles Lakers. He made five total appearances for the Mavericks, averaging 5.4 points, 0.6 rebounds, and 2.4 assists.

=== Return to Canton (2017) ===
On March 8, 2017, after his 10-day contract with the Mavericks expired, Cook returned to the Charge.

=== New Orleans Pelicans (2017) ===
On March 19, 2017, Cook signed a 10-day contract with the New Orleans Pelicans. He went on to sign a second 10-day contract on March 29, and a rest-of-season contract on April 8. That same day, Cook had a career-high 22 points with three assists and a rebound in a 101–123 loss to the Golden State Warriors. He made nine appearances for New Orleans, recording averages of 5.8 points, 0.4 rebounds, and 1.6 assists. On July 25, Cook was waived by the Pelicans.

=== Golden State Warriors (2017–2019) ===
Cook was signed by the Atlanta Hawks for training camp and was waived on October 13, 2017, as one of the team's final preseason roster cuts. He signed a two-way contract with the Golden State Warriors on October 17 and was recalled to the team on November 13. Cook got his first NBA start on December 6, against the Charlotte Hornets, and scored eight points with three assists and three rebounds in 22 minutes. On March 16, 2018, Cook scored a then career-high 25 points with three assists, three steals, and four rebounds in a 93–98 loss to the Sacramento Kings. The following night, he set another career-high 28 points in scoring along with four assists and four rebounds in a 124–109 victory over the Phoenix Suns. On March 29, Cook set another career-high 30 points in scoring along with three assists and four rebounds in a 116–107 loss to the Milwaukee Bucks. He continued to be a key factor for the Warriors with the recent injuries to Stephen Curry. As a result, the Warriors signed Cook to a two-year deal on April 8, to help ensure his eligibility to play in the postseason. Cook made 33 appearances (including 18 starts) for Golden State during the 2017–18 NBA season, recording averages of 9.5 points, 2.5 rebounds, and 2.7 assists. On April 14, Cook made his debut in NBA playoffs, coming off from bench with five points, two assists, four rebounds, and a block in a 113–92 victory over the San Antonio Spurs. The Warriors made the 2018 NBA Finals after defeating the Houston Rockets in seven games in the Western Conference Finals. The Warriors would go on to win the NBA Finals after defeating the Cleveland Cavaliers in four games.

On November 10, 2018, Cook had a season-high 27 points in a 116–100 victory over the Brooklyn Nets. He played in 74 games (including 10 starts) for the Warriors during the 2018–19 NBA season, recording averages of 6.9 points, 2.1 rebounds, and 1.6 assists. The Warriors made it to the 2019 NBA Finals, but were defeated in six games by the Toronto Raptors. On June 28, 2019, the Warriors extended Cook with a qualifying offer, making him a restricted free agent, but rescinded the qualifying offer five days later.

=== Los Angeles Lakers (2019–2021) ===
On July 6, 2019, Cook signed with the Los Angeles Lakers. He made 44 appearances (including one start) for Los Angeles during the 2019–20 NBA season, averaging 5.1 points, 1.2 rebounds, and 1.1 assists. Cook won his second NBA championship when the Lakers defeated the Miami Heat in six games in the 2020 NBA Finals.

On November 19, 2020, the Lakers waived Cook. On December 4, he re-signed with the Lakers. Cook made 16 total appearances for the Lakers in the 2020–21 season, logging averages of 2.1 points, 0.3 rebounds, and 0.3 assists. On February 24, 2021, Cook was waived again by Los Angeles.

=== Cleveland Cavaliers (2021) ===
On March 12, 2021, Cook signed a 10-day contract with the Cleveland Cavaliers, and signed another on March 22. Cook made seven appearances for the Cavaliers, recording averages of 6.1 points, 1.7 rebounds, and 1.9 assists.

=== Lokomotiv Kuban (2021) ===
On September 23, 2021, Cook signed with the Portland Trail Blazers, but was waived on October 16 after two preseason games.

On October 26, 2021, Cook signed with Lokomotiv Kuban of the VTB United League until the end of the 2021–22 season. On December 28, he parted ways with the team. Cook averaged 5.5 points, 2.7 assists and one rebound per game in six games.

=== Stockton Kings (2022) ===
On February 23, 2022, Cook was acquired off of waivers by the Stockton Kings.

=== Zhejiang Lions (2022–2023) ===
On September 21, 2022, Cook signed with the Sacramento Kings. He was waived on October 13.

On November 8, 2022, Cook signed with the Zhejiang Lions of the Chinese Basketball Association (CBA). On December 14, he scored a CBA career-high 54 points in just 29 minutes of action against the Shandong Heroes. Cook was released on January 11, 2023.

=== Gigantes de Carolina (2024) ===
On March 20, 2024, Cook signed with the Gigantes de Carolina of the Baloncesto Superior Nacional.

=== Cangrejeros de Santurce (2024) ===
On April 19, 2024, Cook was acquired by the Cangrejeros de Santurce of the Baloncesto Superior Nacional after being let go by Carolina. However, he left the team on May 3.

In June 2024, Cook signed with the Taiwan Mustangs of The Asian Tournament. He reunited with former Lakers teammates Dwight Howard and DeMarcus Cousins.

=== Al-Ula (2024) ===
On July 12, 2024, Cook signed with Al-Ula of the Saudi Basketball League (SBL).

=== Fujian Sturgeons (2025) ===
On March 4, 2025, Cook signed with the Fujian Sturgeons of the Chinese Basketball Association.

== Career statistics ==
Legend
GP	Games played	GS	Games started	MPG	Minutes per game
FG%	Field goal percentage	3P%	3-point field goal percentage	FT%	Free throw percentage
RPG	Rebounds per game	APG	Assists per game	SPG	Steals per game
BPG	Blocks per game	PPG	Points per game	**Bold**	Career high
†	Won an NBA championship

=== NBA ===
==== Regular season ====
Year	Team	GP	GS	MPG	FG%	3P%	FT%	RPG	APG	SPG	BPG	PPG
2016–17	Dallas	5	0	15.4	.440	.357	.000	.6	2.4	.2	.0	5.4
2016–17	New Orleans	9	0	12.3	**.537**	**.500**	.667	.4	1.6	.3	.0	5.8
2017–18†	Golden State	33	**18**	**22.4**	.484	.442	.880	**2.5**	**2.7**	**.4**	.0	**9.5**
2018–19	Golden State	**74**	10	14.3	.465	.405	.769	2.1	1.6	.3	.0	6.9
2019–20†	L.A. Lakers	44	1	11.5	.425	.365	.786	1.2	1.1	.3	.0	5.1
2020–21	L.A. Lakers	16	0	3.9	.462	.385	.800	.3	.3	.1	.1	2.1
2020–21	Cleveland	7	0	13.6	.405	.462	**1.000**	1.7	1.9	**.4**	.0	6.1
Career		188	29	14.1	.461	.408	.795	1.7	1.6	.3	.0	6.4

==== Playoffs ====
Year	Team	GP	GS	MPG	FG%	3P%	FT%	RPG	APG	SPG	BPG	PPG
2018†	Golden State	**17**	0	10.3	.448	.226	.824	**1.4**	.6	**.2**	**.1**	**4.8**
2019	Golden State	**17**	0	**11.4**	.400	.324	**1.000**	1.1	.7	**.2**	**.1**	4.2
2020†	L.A. Lakers	6	0	4.0	**.500**	**.500**	**1.000**	.2	**.8**	.0	.0	2.2
Career		40	0	9.8	.429	.290	.864	1.1	.7	.2	.1	4.1

=== College ===
Year	Team	GP	GS	MPG	FG%	3P%	FT%	RPG	APG	SPG	BPG	PPG
2011–12	Duke	33	4	11.7	.405	.250	.776	1.0	1.9	.4	**.1**	4.4
2012–13	Duke	36	34	33.6	.416	.393	.877	**3.8**	**5.3**	**1.4**	**.1**	11.7
2013–14	Duke	35	22	29.8	.432	.371	.827	2.2	4.4	1.3	.0	11.6
2014–15	Duke	**39**	**39**	**35.8**	**.453**	**.395**	**.891**	3.4	2.6	1.0	.0	**15.3**
Career		143	99	28.2	.432	.375	.853	2.7	3.6	1.1	.1	11.0

== National team career ==
Cook was named to the 2009–10 USA Basketball Men's Developmental National Team on May 28, 2009. He was a member of the 2009 USA U16 National Team that posted a 5–0 mark, captured the 2009 FIBA Americas U16 World Championship gold medal, and qualified the U.S. for the 2010 FIBA U17 World Championship. Cook started all five games and averaged 15.6 points, 3.6 rebounds, and a team-high 5.0 assists per game. He was also a member of the 2010 USA U17 World Championship Team that posted an 8–0 record and captured the gold medal. Cook started all eight games and averaged 7.5 points and 3.0 rebounds per game, while dishing out a tournament-leading 7.4 assists.

On January 16, 2011, Cook was named to the 2011 USA Basketball Junior National Select Team, which competed against a World Select Team in the annual Nike Hoop Summit. Cook had 12 points and three assists in 16 minutes, and Team USA went on to beat the World Select Team 92–80.

== Personal life ==
Cook's late father, Ted, was a noted entrepreneur. Both of Quinn Cook's parents attended Howard University.
