= Jordan Bell =

American basketball player (born 1995)

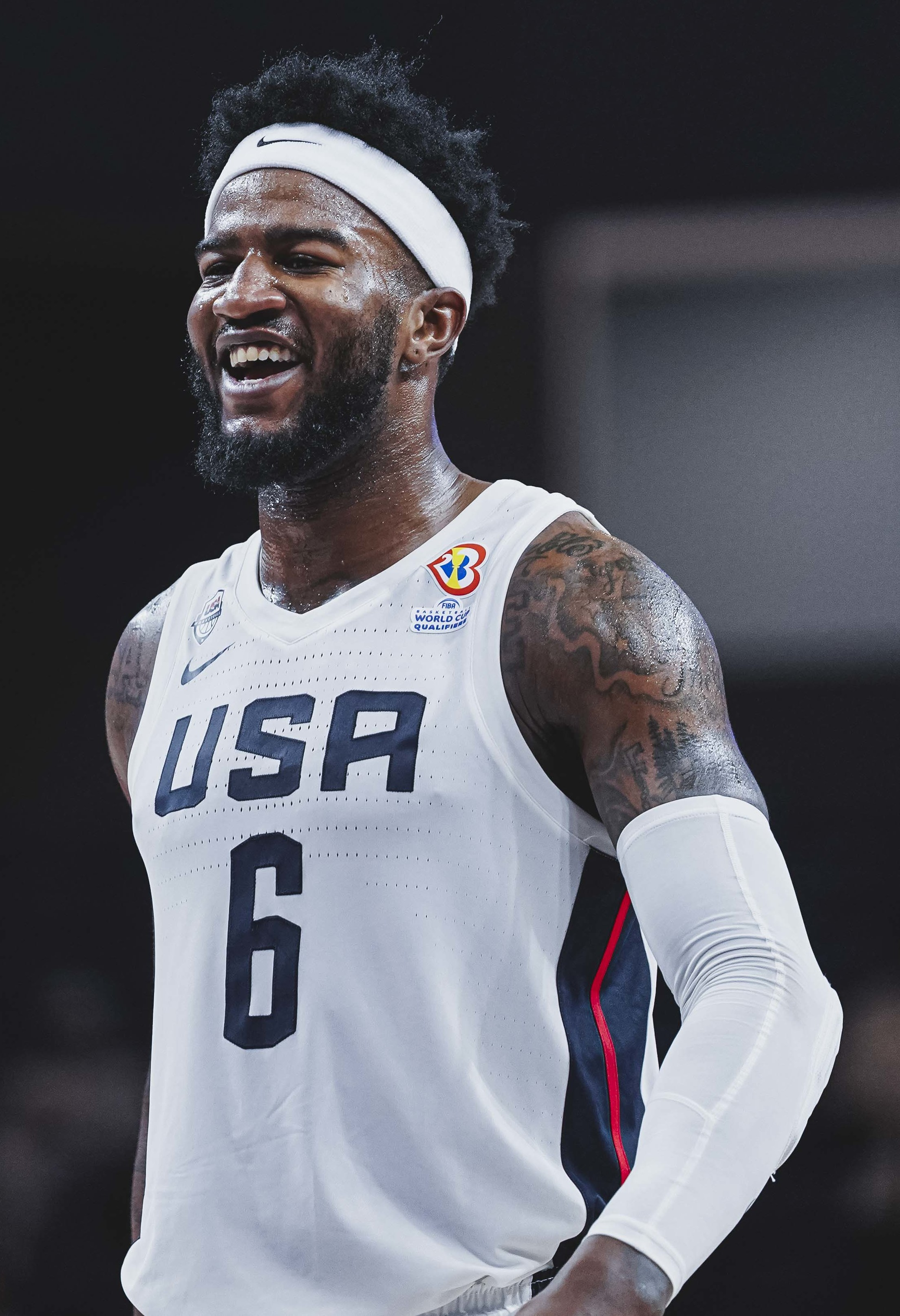
- Bell with the United States national team during the qualifiers for the 2023 FIBA Basketball World Cup

Free agent
- Position: Power forward / center

Personal information
- Born: January 7, 1995 (age 31) Los Angeles, California, U.S.
- Listed height: 6 ft 7 in (2.01 m)
- Listed weight: 216 lb (98 kg)

Career information
- High school: Long Beach Polytechnic (Long Beach, California)
- College: Oregon (2013–2017)
- NBA draft: 2017: 2nd round, 38th overall pick
- Drafted by: Chicago Bulls
- Playing career: 2017–present

Career history
- 2017–2019: Golden State Warriors
- 2018: →Santa Cruz Warriors
- 2019–2020: Minnesota Timberwolves
- 2020: Memphis Grizzlies
- 2021: Washington Wizards
- 2021: Erie BayHawks
- 2021: Golden State Warriors
- 2021–2022: Santa Cruz Warriors
- 2021–2022: Chicago Bulls
- 2022: Fort Wayne Mad Ants
- 2022–2023: Guangzhou Loong Lions
- 2023–2024: Indiana Mad Ants
- 2024: Guangdong Southern Tigers
- 2024: Leones de Ponce
- 2024–2025: Indiana Mad Ants
- 2026: Noblesville Boom

Career highlights
- NBA champion (2018); Second-team All-Pac-12 (2017); Pac-12 Defensive Player of the Year (2017)
- Stats at NBA.com
- Stats at Basketball Reference

Jordan Trennie Bell (born January 7, 1995) is an American professional basketball player who last played for the Noblesville Boom of the NBA G League. He played college basketball for the Oregon Ducks. As a junior in 2017, Bell earned second-team all-conference honors in the Pac-12, when he was also named the conference's Defensive Player of the Year. He was drafted in the second round of the 2017 NBA draft by the Chicago Bulls. Bell won his first championship in his rookie season when the Warriors defeated the Cleveland Cavaliers in 2018.

== High school career ==
Bell was born in Los Angeles, and attended Long Beach Polytechnic High School in Long Beach, California.

== College career ==
Bell committed to the University of Oregon to play college basketball.

Bell redshirted in 2013. As a redshirt freshman at Oregon, Bell averaged 5.1 points, 6.1 rebounds and 2.7 blocks per game. His 94 blocks were a school record for a season. As a redshirt sophomore, he averaged 7.0 points, 5.4 rebounds and 1.8 blocks per game. As a redshirt junior, Bell averaged 10.9 points, 8.8 rebounds and 2.3 blocks per game and helped lead Oregon to the Final Four.

== Professional career ==
=== Golden State Warriors (2017–2019) ===
On April 18, 2017, Bell declared for the 2017 NBA draft, and was picked with the 38th pick by the Chicago Bulls and later traded to the Golden State Warriors for $3.5 million in cash considerations.

Bell participated in the 2017 NBA Summer League.

On December 22, against the Los Angeles Lakers, Bell scored a career-high 20 points on 9-for-13 shooting to go with his career-high 10 rebounds in 25 minutes. On April 14, 2018, Bell made his debut in the NBA playoffs, coming off of the bench with three points and two rebounds in a 113–92 win over the San Antonio Spurs. The Warriors made it to the 2018 NBA Finals where they would sweep the Cleveland Cavaliers in four games.

Bell played in the 2018 NBA Summer League for the Warriors. On March 27, 2019, the Warriors suspended Bell for one game due to "conduct detrimental to the team". On May 16, 2019, Bell came off the bench and scored a playoff career-high 11 points to go with 3 rebounds, 2 steals, and an assist and a block apiece in a 114–111 win against the Portland Trail Blazers. On May 20, Bell made his first career playoff start in a series clinching win against the Blazers, contributing 7 points, 2 assists, and a steal. The Warriors reached the 2019 NBA Finals, but were defeated in 6 games by the Toronto Raptors.

=== Minnesota Timberwolves (2019–2020) ===
On June 28, 2019, the Warriors extended Bell a qualifying offer, making him a restricted free agent. On July 11, Bell signed with the Minnesota Timberwolves.

=== Memphis Grizzlies (2020) ===
On February 5, 2020, Bell and Robert Covington were traded from the Timberwolves to the Houston Rockets in a four-team, 12-player deal. The next day, he was traded to the Memphis Grizzlies for Bruno Caboclo and a 2023 second-round pick swap. On March 2, 2020, Bell was waived by the Memphis Grizzlies.

On March 11, 2020, the Capital City Go-Go of the NBA G League announced that they had added Bell off of waivers, but Bell had yet to have his on-court debut for that team by the time that the 2019–20 season was suspended due to the COVID-19 pandemic. The G League season was later cancelled.

On June 29, 2020, the Cleveland Cavaliers announced that they had signed Bell to a two-year deal. On November 22, 2020, Bell, along with Alfonzo McKinnie, was traded to his hometown team the Lakers in exchange for JaVale McGee; however, Bell was waived the following day.

=== Washington Wizards (2021) ===
On December 19, 2020, Bell signed with the Washington Wizards, but was waived the same day and subsequently added to the Erie BayHawks as a flex-affiliate player sent from the Capital City Go-Go on January 12, 2021.

However, before playing for Erie, Bell signed on January 23, 2021, a 10-day contract with the Wizards, but after three games, he was released on January 31.

=== Erie BayHawks (2021) ===
On February 2, 2021, the Erie BayHawks re-added Bell to their roster for the start of the G League season. He averaged 17.6 points, 9.3 rebounds and 3.3 assists per game in seven games for Erie.

=== Return to Washington (2021) ===
On April 14, 2021, Bell signed a second 10-day contract with the Wizards.

=== Return to Golden State (2021) ===
On May 13, 2021, Bell signed a two-way contract with the Golden State Warriors.

=== Santa Cruz Warriors (2021) ===
In August 2021, Bell joined the Atlanta Hawks for the 2021 NBA Summer League, scoring 6 points in 17 minutes on 3-of-4 shooting in his debut in a 85–83 loss against the Boston Celtics. On September 24, 2021, he re-signed with the Warriors, but was waived as one of the last cuts before the start of the regular season. In October 2021, Bell joined the Santa Cruz Warriors.

=== Chicago Bulls (2021–2022) ===
On December 30, 2021, Bell signed a 10-day contract with the Chicago Bulls, the team that originally drafted him, using the hardship exception that became available when the Bulls had multiple players in the NBA's health and safety protocols.

=== Return to Santa Cruz (2022) ===
On January 9, 2022, Bell was reacquired by the Santa Cruz Warriors.

=== Fort Wayne Mad Ants (2022) ===
On January 31, 2022, Bell was traded to the Fort Wayne Mad Ants.

=== Guangzhou Loong Lions (2022–2023) ===
On September 7, 2022, Bell was signed by the Guangzhou Loong Lions.

=== Indiana Mad Ants (2023–2024) ===
On September 28, 2023, Bell signed with the Indiana Pacers, but was waived two days later. On October 28, 2023, he joined the Indiana Mad Ants and on March 11, 2024, he was bought out to go abroad.

=== Guangdong Southern Tigers (2024) ===
On March 14, 2024, Bell signed with the Guangdong Southern Tigers of the Chinese Basketball Association.

=== Leones de Ponce (2024) ===
On May 16, 2024, Bell signed with the Leones de Ponce of the Baloncesto Superior Nacional.

=== Second stint with Mad Ants / Noblesville Boom (2024, 2026) ===
On November 13, 2024, Bell returned to the Indiana Mad Ants, but was let go five days later after sustaining a season-ending knee injury.

On March 19, 2026, Bell signed with the Noblesville Boom of the NBA G League.

== Career statistics ==
Legend
GP	Games played	GS	Games started	MPG	Minutes per game
FG%	Field goal percentage	3P%	3-point field goal percentage	FT%	Free throw percentage
RPG	Rebounds per game	APG	Assists per game	SPG	Steals per game
BPG	Blocks per game	PPG	Points per game	**Bold**	Career high
†	Won an NBA championship

=== NBA ===
==== Regular season ====
Year	Team	GP	GS	MPG	FG%	3P%	FT%	RPG	APG	SPG	BPG	PPG
2017–18	Golden State†	57	**13**	14.2	**.627**	.000	.682	3.6	1.8	.6	1.0	4.6
2018–19	Golden State	**68**	3	11.6	.516	.000	.610	2.7	1.1	.3	.8	3.3
2019–20	Minnesota	27	0	8.7	.533	.222	.568	2.9	.5	.1	.4	3.1
2019–20	Memphis	2	0	10.5	.429	**.667**	**1.000**	1.5	1.0	.5	.0	**5.0**
2020–21	Washington	5	1	13.4	.350	.000	—	3.8	1.0	.6	.6	2.8
2020–21	Golden State	1	0	**15.0**	.000	—	.500	**5.0**	**2.0**	.0	**2.0**	1.0
2021–22	Chicago	1	0	2.0	—	—	—	1.0	.0	**1.0**	.0	.0
Career		161	17	12.0	.552	.200	.636	3.1	1.2	.4	.8	3.7

==== Playoffs ====
Year	Team	GP	GS	MPG	FG%	3P%	FT%	RPG	APG	SPG	BPG	PPG
2018	Golden State†	**17**	0	**10.2**	.531	.000	.500	**2.8**	**.9**	**.4**	**.5**	2.4
2019	Golden State	15	**2**	7.1	**.548**	.000	**.700**	1.3	.7	.3	**.5**	**2.7**
Career		32	2	8.7	.540	.000	.583	2.1	.8	.3	.5	2.6

=== College ===
Year	Team	GP	GS	MPG	FG%	3P%	FT%	RPG	APG	SPG	BPG	PPG
2014–15	Oregon	35	20	23.7	.597	–	.524	6.1	1.3	.8	**2.7**	5.1
2015–16	Oregon	31	4	20.5	.576	.000	.519	5.3	1.2	1.1	1.7	6.8
2016–17	Oregon	**39**	**38**	**28.8**	**.636**	**.214**	**.701**	**8.8**	**1.8**	**1.3**	2.3	**10.9**
Career		105	62	24.7	.610	.188	.630	6.8	1.5	1.1	2.2	7.8
