= 2020–21 Orlando Magic season =

NBA professional basketball team season

- Head coach: Steve Clifford
- General manager: John Hammond
- Owners: RDV Sports, Inc.
- Arena: Amway Center

Results
- Record: 21–51 (.292)
- Place: Division: 5th (Southeast); Conference: 14th (Eastern)
- Playoff finish: Did not qualify
- Stats at Basketball Reference

Local media
- Television: Bally Sports Florida (Note: Formerly Fox Sports Florida until March 31, 2021.)
- Radio: 96.9 The Game

The 2020–21 Orlando Magic season was the 32nd season of the franchise in the National Basketball Association (NBA). As a result of the COVID-19 pandemic, the regular season for the league began on December 22, 2020, and featured a 72-game schedule rather than the typical 82-game schedule. The Magic missed the playoffs for the first time since the 2017–18 season. Following the season, head coach Steve Clifford and the Magic mutually agreed to part ways after three seasons with the team.

== Draft picks ==
Round	Pick	Player	Position	Nationality	School/club team
1	15	Cole Anthony	PG	USA	UNC

The Magic entered the draft with one first-round pick. Earlier that day, they traded their second-round pick to the Milwaukee Bucks in exchange for two future second-round picks.

== Roster ==
2020–21 Orlando Magic roster
Players

Pos.	No.	Player	Height	Weight	DOB	From
G	50	Cole Anthony	6 ft 2 in (1.88 m)	190 lb (86 kg)	2000-05-15	North Carolina
F	8	Dwayne Bacon	6 ft 6 in (1.98 m)	221 lb (100 kg)	1995-08-30	Florida State
C	5	Mo Bamba	7 ft 0 in (2.13 m)	231 lb (105 kg)	1998-05-12	Texas
F	17	Ignas Brazdeikis	6 ft 7 in (2.01 m)	221 lb (100 kg)	1999-01-08	Michigan
C	34	Wendell Carter	6 ft 10 in (2.08 m)	270 lb (122 kg)	1999-04-16	Duke
G	7	Michael Carter-Williams (injured)	6 ft 5 in (1.96 m)	190 lb (86 kg)	1991-10-10	Syracuse
F	11	James Ennis (injured)	6 ft 6 in (1.98 m)	215 lb (98 kg)	1990-07-01	Long Beach State
G	20	Markelle Fultz (injured)	6 ft 3 in (1.91 m)	209 lb (95 kg)	1998-05-29	Washington
G	13	R. J. Hampton	6 ft 4 in (1.93 m)	175 lb (79 kg)	2001-02-07	Little Elm HS (TX)
G	14	Gary Harris	6 ft 4 in (1.93 m)	210 lb (95 kg)	1994-09-14	Michigan State
F	1	Jonathan Isaac (injured)	6 ft 11 in (2.11 m)	230 lb (104 kg)	1997-10-03	Florida State
F	3	Chuma Okeke (injured)	6 ft 7 in (2.01 m)	229 lb (104 kg)	1998-08-18	Auburn
F	22	Otto Porter (injured)	6 ft 8 in (2.03 m)	198 lb (90 kg)	1993-06-03	Georgetown
G	25	Chasson Randle (TW)	6 ft 2 in (1.88 m)	185 lb (84 kg)	1993-02-05	Stanford
G/F	31	Terrence Ross	6 ft 7 in (2.01 m)	206 lb (93 kg)	1991-02-05	Washington
G	12	Sindarius Thornwell (TW)	6 ft 4 in (1.93 m)	215 lb (98 kg)	1994-11-15	South Carolina
F/C	21	Moritz Wagner	6 ft 11 in (2.11 m)	245 lb (111 kg)	1997-04-26	Michigan

Coaches
Head coach
- Steve Clifford
Assistant(s)
- Michael Batiste
- Tyrone Corbin
- Pat Delany
- Steve Hetzel
- Bruce Kreutzer
- Dylan Murphy

Legend
- (DP) Unsigned draft pick
- (FA) Free agent
- (S) Suspended
- (GL) On assignment to G League affiliate
- (TW) Two-way affiliate player
- Injured

Roster
Updated: May 12, 2021

== Standings ==
=== Division ===
Southeast Division	W	L	PCT	GB	Home	Road	Div	GP
y – Atlanta Hawks	41	31	.569	–	25‍–‍11	16‍–‍20	9–3	72
x – Miami Heat	40	32	.556	1.0	21‍–‍15	19‍–‍17	6–6	72
x – Washington Wizards	34	38	.472	7.0	19‍–‍17	15‍–‍21	3–9	72
pi – Charlotte Hornets	33	39	.458	8.0	18‍–‍19	15‍–‍20	8–4	72
Orlando Magic	21	51	.292	20.0	11‍–‍25	10‍–‍26	4–8	72

=== Conference ===
Eastern Conference
#	Team	W	L	PCT	GB	GP
1	c − Philadelphia 76ers *	49	23	.681	–	72
2	x – Brooklyn Nets	48	24	.667	1.0	72
3	y – Milwaukee Bucks *	46	26	.639	3.0	72
4	x – New York Knicks	41	31	.569	8.0	72
5	y – Atlanta Hawks *	41	31	.569	8.0	72
6	x – Miami Heat	40	32	.556	9.0	72
7	x – Boston Celtics	36	36	.500	13.0	72
8	x – Washington Wizards	34	38	.472	15.0	72
9	pi – Indiana Pacers	34	38	.472	15.0	72
10	pi – Charlotte Hornets	33	39	.458	16.0	72
11	Chicago Bulls	31	41	.431	18.0	72
12	Toronto Raptors	27	45	.375	22.0	72
13	Cleveland Cavaliers	22	50	.306	27.0	72
14	Orlando Magic	21	51	.292	28.0	72
15	Detroit Pistons	20	52	.278	29.0	72

Notes

- z – Clinched home court advantage for the entire playoffs
- c – Clinched home court advantage for the conference playoffs
- y – Clinched division title
- x – Clinched playoff spot
- pb – Clinched play-in spot
- o – Eliminated from playoff contention
- * – Division leader

== Game log ==
=== Preseason ===
2020 preseason game log
Total: 2–2 (Home: 1–1; Road: 1–1)
Preseason: 2–2 (home: 1–1; road: 1–1)

Game	Date	Team	Score	High points	High rebounds	High assists	Location Attendance	Record
1	December 11	@ Atlanta	W 116–112	Nikola Vučević (18)	Nikola Vučević (11)	Aaron Gordon (6)	State Farm Arena	1–0
2	December 13	@ Atlanta	L 107–116	Markelle Fultz (21)	Nikola Vučević (15)	Michael Carter-Williams (5)	State Farm Arena	1–1
3	December 17	Charlotte	L 115–123	Nikola Vučević (27)	Nikola Vučević (12)	Markelle Fultz (6)	Amway Center	1–2
4	December 19	Charlotte	W 120–117	Aaron Gordon (20)	Nikola Vučević (12)	Anthony, Fultz (4)	Amway Center	2–2

2020–21 pre-season schedule

=== Regular season ===
Games were held with a limited number of fans in attendance, if any at all due to varying COVID-19 guidelines from state to state.

2020–21 game log
Total: 21–51 (Home: 11–25; Road: 10–26)
December: 4–1 (home: 1–1; road: 3–0)

Game	Date	Team	Score	High points	High rebounds	High assists	Location Attendance	Record
1	December 23	Miami	W 113–107	Evan Fournier (25)	Nikola Vučević (11)	Cole Anthony (6)	Amway Center; 3,396	1–0
2	December 26	@ Washington	W 130–120	Terrence Ross (25)	Nikola Vučević (17)	Markelle Fultz (7)	Capital One Arena; Held without fans	2–0
3	December 27	@ Washington	W 120–113	Fultz, Ross (26)	Nikola Vučević (8)	Nikola Vučević (4)	Capital One Arena; Held without fans	3–0
4	December 29	@ Oklahoma City	W 118–107	Nikola Vučević (28)	Nikola Vučević (10)	Markelle Fultz (10)	Chesapeake Energy Arena; Held without fans	4–0
5	December 31	Philadelphia	L 92–116	Nikola Vučević (19)	Nikola Vučević (10)	Markelle Fultz (4)	Amway Center; 3,247	4–1

January: 4–12 (home: 3–5; road: 1–7)

Game	Date	Team	Score	High points	High rebounds	High assists	Location Attendance	Record
6	January 2	Oklahoma City	L 99–108	Nikola Vučević (30)	Nikola Vučević (13)	Markelle Fultz (8)	Amway Center; 3,339	4–2
7	January 4	Cleveland	W 103–83	Aaron Gordon (24)	Khem Birch (12)	Markelle Fultz (8)	Amway Center; 2,726	5–2
8	January 6	Cleveland	W 105–94	Terrence Ross (20)	Khem Birch (10)	Nikola Vučević (6)	Amway Center; 2,948	6–2
9	January 8	@ Houston	L 90–132	Nikola Vučević (22)	Nikola Vučević (12)	Jordan Bone (4)	Toyota Center; 3,039	6–3
10	January 9	@ Dallas	L 98–112	Nikola Vučević (30)	Nikola Vučević (15)	Aaron Gordon (5)	American Airlines Center; Held without fans	6–4
11	January 11	Milwaukee	L 99–121	Nikola Vučević (28)	Nikola Vučević (13)	Aaron Gordon (8)	Amway Center; 3,248	6–5
—	January 13	@ Boston	Postponed due to Boston not having enough players available. Makeup date: March 21.					
12	January 15	@ Boston	L 97–124	Aaron Gordon (17)	Khem Birch (12)	Nikola Vučević (4)	TD Garden; Held without fans	6–6
13	January 16	@ Brooklyn	L 115–122	Nikola Vučević (34)	Nikola Vučević (10)	Cole Anthony (8)	Barclays Center; Held without fans	6–7
14	January 18	@ New York	L 84–91	Nikola Vučević (24)	Aaron Gordon (17)	Aaron Gordon (9)	Madison Square Garden; Held without fans	6–8
15	January 20	@ Minnesota	W 97–96	Nikola Vučević (28)	Aaron Gordon (9)	Aaron Gordon (7)	Target Center; Held without fans	7–8
16	January 22	@ Indiana	L 118–120 (OT)	Evan Fournier (26)	Nikola Vučević (12)	Fournier, Gordon (9)	Bankers Life Fieldhouse; Held without fans	7–9
17	January 24	Charlotte	L 104–107	Nikola Vučević (22)	Nikola Vučević (13)	Anthony, Fournier (6)	Amway Center; 3,507	7–10
18	January 25	Charlotte	W 117–108	Nikola Vučević (28)	Nikola Vučević (12)	Gordon, Vučević (7)	Amway Center; 3,167	8–10
19	January 27	Sacramento	L 107–121	Nikola Vučević (26)	Khem Birch (14)	Cole Anthony (6)	Amway Center; 3,216	8–11
20	January 29	L. A. Clippers	L 90–116	Terrence Ross (24)	Clark, Gordon (7)	Cole Anthony (6)	Amway Center; 3,763	8–12
21	January 31	@ Toronto	L 102–115	Cole Anthony (16)	Nikola Vučević (14)	Cole Anthony (6)	Amalie Arena; Held without fans	8–13

February: 5–8 (home: 4–4; road: 1–4)

Game	Date	Team	Score	High points	High rebounds	High assists	Location Attendance	Record
22	February 2	Toronto	L 108–123	Fournier, Vučević (21)	Nikola Vučević (18)	Bone, Fournier, Vučević (4)	Amway Center; 3,211	8–14
23	February 5	Chicago	W 123–119	Nikola Vučević (43)	Nikola Vučević (19)	Cole Anthony (9)	Amway Center; 3,535	9–14
24	February 6	Chicago	L 92–118	Nikola Vučević (17)	Nikola Vučević (8)	Cole Anthony (5)	Amway Center; 3,880	9–15
25	February 9	@ Portland	L 97–106	Nikola Vučević (27)	Nikola Vučević (15)	Chuma Okeke (5)	Moda Center; Held without fans	9–16
26	February 11	@ Golden State	L 105–111	Nikola Vučević (25)	Nikola Vučević (13)	Okeke, Vučević (5)	Chase Center; Held without fans	9–17
27	February 12	@ Sacramento	W 123–112	Nikola Vučević (42)	Nikola Vučević (9)	Michael Carter-Williams (7)	Golden 1 Center; Held without fans	10–17
28	February 14	@ Phoenix	L 90–109	Michael Carter-Williams (23)	Mohamed Bamba (11)	Terrence Ross (5)	PHX Arena; 1,732	10–18
29	February 17	New York	W 107–89	Terrence Ross (30)	Nikola Vučević (16)	Michael Carter-Williams (7)	Amway Center; 4,249	11–18
30	February 19	Golden State	W 124–120	Nikola Vučević (30)	Nikola Vučević (16)	Nikola Vučević (10)	Amway Center; 4,287	12–18
31	February 21	Detroit	W 105–96	Nikola Vučević (37)	Nikola Vučević (12)	Evan Fournier (7)	Amway Center; 4,002	13–18
32	February 23	Detroit	L 93–105	Nikola Vučević (20)	Nikola Vučević (9)	Michael Carter-Williams (5)	Amway Center; 3,631	13–19
33	February 25	@ Brooklyn	L 92–129	Nikola Vučević (28)	Nikola Vučević (12)	Michael Carter-Williams (5)	Barclays Center; 327	13–20
34	February 27	Utah	L 109–124	Nikola Vučević (34)	Nikola Vučević (8)	Carter-Williams, Randle (7)	Amway Center; 4,242	13–21

March: 3–10 (home: 2–5; road: 1–5)

Game	Date	Team	Score	High points	High rebounds	High assists	Location Attendance	Record
35	March 1	Dallas	L 124–130	Nikola Vučević (29)	Nikola Vučević (15)	Nikola Vučević (8)	Amway Center; 3,766	13–22
36	March 3	Atlanta	L 112–115	Nikola Vučević (29)	Nikola Vučević (9)	Michael Carter-Williams (6)	Amway Center; 3,969	13–23
All-Star Break
37	March 11	@ Miami	L 103–111	Nikola Vučević (24)	Nikola Vučević (17)	Michael Carter-Williams (7)	American Airlines Arena; Held without fans	13–24
38	March 12	@ San Antonio	L 77–104	Nikola Vučević (26)	Nikola Vučević (9)	Bacon, Carter-Williams, Randle, Vučević (3)	AT&T Center; Held without fans	13–25
39	March 14	Miami	L 97–102	Nikola Vučević (38)	Nikola Vučević (10)	Michael Carter-Williams (7)	Amway Center; 3,264	13–26
40	March 18	@ New York	L 93–94	Evan Fournier (23)	Nikola Vučević (16)	Aaron Gordon (7)	Madison Square Garden; 1,531	13–27
41	March 19	Brooklyn	W 121–113	Aaron Gordon (38)	Nikola Vučević (14)	Nikola Vučević (8)	Amway Center; 3,665	14–27
42	March 21	@ Boston	L 96–112	Nikola Vučević (22)	Nikola Vučević (13)	Aaron Gordon (5)	TD Garden; Held without fans	14–28
43	March 23	Denver	L 99–110	Evan Fournier (31)	Al-Farouq Aminu (10)	Aminu, Fournier, Gordon (6)	Amway Center; 3,485	14–29
44	March 24	Phoenix	W 112–111	Nikola Vučević (27)	Nikola Vučević (14)	Nikola Vučević (4)	Amway Center; 3,891	15–29
45	March 26	Portland	L 105–112	Chuma Okeke (22)	Khem Birch (15)	Bacon, Carter-Williams (6)	Amway Center; 3,827	15–30
46	March 28	@ L. A. Lakers	L 93–96	Dwayne Bacon (26)	Bacon, Carter Jr. (8)	Bamba, Birch, Carter-Williams, Okeke, Randle (3)	Staples Center; Held without fans	15–31
47	March 30	@ L. A. Clippers	W 103–96	Chuma Okeke (18)	Mohamed Bamba (8)	Michael Carter-Williams (9)	Staples Center; Held without fans	16–31

April: 3–13 (home: 0–8; road: 3–5)

Game	Date	Team	Score	High points	High rebounds	High assists	Location Attendance	Record
48	April 1	@ New Orleans	W 115–110	Terrence Ross (19)	Wendell Carter Jr. (12)	Terrence Ross (5)	Smoothie King Center; 3,700	17–31
49	April 3	@ Utah	L 91–137	Wendell Carter Jr. (19)	Wendell Carter Jr. (12)	Okeke, Ross (3)	Vivint Arena; 5,546	17–32
50	April 4	@ Denver	L 109–119	Okeke, Ross (19)	Wendell Carter Jr. (9)	Ennis III, Okeke (5)	Ball Arena; 3,927	17–33
51	April 7	Washington	L 116–131	Terrence Ross (24)	Mohamed Bamba (8)	Cole Anthony (7)	Amway Center; 3,991	17–34
52	April 9	Indiana	L 106–111	Terrence Ross (24)	Anthony, Carter Jr. (9)	Chuma Okeke (7)	Amway Center; 3,777	17–35
53	April 11	Milwaukee	L 87–124	Mohamed Bamba (21)	Anthony, Carter Jr. (8)	Cole Anthony (5)	Amway Center; 3,316	17–36
54	April 12	San Antonio	L 97–120	R. J. Hampton (16)	Carter Jr., Hampton (8)	Wendell Carter Jr. (4)	Amway Center; 3,107	17–37
55	April 14	@ Chicago	W 115–106	James Ennis III (22)	Wendell Carter Jr. (12)	Gary Harris (6)	United Center; Held without fans	18–37
56	April 16	@ Toronto	L 102–113	Wendell Carter Jr. (20)	Wendell Carter Jr. (9)	Cole Anthony (5)	Amalie Arena; Attendance not reported	18–38
57	April 18	Houston	L 110–114	Dwayne Bacon (22)	Wendell Carter Jr. (10)	Cole Anthony (9)	Amway Center; 3,722	18–39
58	April 20	@ Atlanta	L 96–112	Anthony, Okeke (17)	Bamba, Carter Jr. (8)	Cole Anthony (8)	State Farm Arena; Attendance not reported	18–40
59	April 22	New Orleans	L 100–135	Cannady, Bamba (17)	Mohamed Bamba (12)	Chasson Randle (4)	Amway Center; 3,411	18–41
60	April 25	Indiana	L 112–131	Dwayne Bacon (20)	Wendell Carter Jr. (13)	Cole Anthony (7)	Amway Center; 3,519	18–42
61	April 26	L. A. Lakers	L 103–114	Chuma Okeke (18)	Wendell Carter Jr. (8)	Cole Anthony (7)	Amway Center; 4,099	18–43
62	April 28	@ Cleveland	W 109–104	Gary Harris (19)	James Ennis III (8)	Gary Harris (7)	Rocket Mortgage FieldHouse; 4,148	19–43
63	April 30	@ Memphis	L 75–92	Anthony, Bamba (15)	Bamba, Hall (11)	Gary Harris (4)	FedExForum; 2,850	19–44

May: 2–7 (home: 1–2; road: 1–5)

Game	Date	Team	Score	High points	High rebounds	High assists	Location Attendance	Record
64	May 1	Memphis	W 112–111	Cole Anthony (26)	Cole Anthony (8)	Cole Anthony (6)	Amway Center; 3,924	20–44
65	May 3	@ Detroit	W 119–112	Mohamed Bamba (22)	Mohamed Bamba (15)	R. J. Hampton (10)	Little Caesars Arena; 750	21–44
66	May 5	Boston	L 96–132	Bacon, Wagner (20)	Mohamed Bamba (15)	R. J. Hampton (5)	Amway Center; 4,249	21–45
67	May 7	@ Charlotte	L 112–122	Dwayne Bacon (26)	Mohamed Bamba (18)	Chasson Randle (4)	Spectrum Center; 3,751	21–46
68	May 9	Minnesota	L 96–128	R. J. Hampton (19)	Donta Hall (8)	Anthony, Brazdeikis, Hampton, Thornwell (3)	Amway Center; 4,086	21–47
69	May 11	@ Milwaukee	L 102–114	Cole Anthony (18)	Wendell Carter Jr. (14)	R. J. Hampton (5)	Fiserv Forum; 3,280	21–48
70	May 13	@ Atlanta	L 93–116	R. J. Hampton (15)	Wendell Carter Jr. (11)	Cole Anthony (6)	State Farm Arena; 2,910	21–49
71	May 14	@ Philadelphia	L 97–122	Ignas Brazdeikis (21)	R. J. Hampton (11)	R. J. Hampton (9)	Wells Fargo Center; 5,119	21–50
72	May 16	@ Philadelphia	L 117–128	Cole Anthony (37)	Donta Hall (10)	Bamba, Brazdeikis (4)	Wells Fargo Center; 5,119	21–51

2020–21 season schedule

== Player statistics ==
=== Regular season ===
Player	POS	GP	GS	MP	REB	AST	STL	BLK	PTS	MPG	RPG	APG	SPG	BPG	PPG
Dwayne Bacon	SG	72	50	1,853	224	93	45	5	788	25.7	3.1	1.3	.6	.1	10.9
Khem Birch^{†}	C	48	5	952	243	53	32	28	255	19.8	5.1	1.1	.7	.6	5.3
Cole Anthony	PG	47	34	1,273	221	192	30	18	605	27.1	4.7	4.1	.6	.4	12.9
Mo Bamba	C	46	5	725	265	35	14	58	367	15.8	5.8	.8	.3	1.3	8.0
Terrence Ross	SG	46	2	1,347	158	108	47	21	717	29.3	3.4	2.3	1.0	.5	15.6
Chuma Okeke	PF	45	19	1,133	181	101	48	22	349	25.2	4.0	2.2	1.1	.5	7.8
Nikola Vučević^{†}	C	44	44	1,500	517	167	42	28	1,080	34.1	11.8	3.8	1.0	.6	24.5
James Ennis III	SF	41	37	986	166	62	32	7	345	24.0	4.0	1.5	.8	.2	8.4
Chasson Randle	PG	41	5	837	82	74	22	5	266	20.4	2.0	1.8	.5	.1	6.5
Gary Clark^{†}	SF	35	11	637	112	30	12	7	119	18.2	3.2	.9	.3	.2	3.4
Michael Carter-Williams	SG	31	25	800	139	129	25	17	274	25.8	4.5	4.2	.8	.5	8.8
Evan Fournier^{†}	SF	26	26	787	75	95	27	9	511	30.3	2.9	3.7	1.0	.3	19.7
R. J. Hampton^{†}	SG	26	1	655	129	73	16	8	290	25.2	5.0	2.8	.6	.3	11.2
Aaron Gordon^{†}	PF	25	25	736	166	105	16	20	364	29.4	6.6	4.2	.6	.8	14.6
Wendell Carter Jr.^{†}	C	22	19	583	193	35	17	18	258	26.5	8.8	1.6	.8	.8	11.7
Gary Harris^{†}	SG	20	19	499	32	46	11	7	204	25.0	1.6	2.3	.6	.4	10.2
Al-Farouq Aminu^{†}	PF	17	14	367	91	29	17	9	93	21.6	5.4	1.7	1.0	.5	5.5
Jordan Bone	PG	14	0	196	24	18	2	0	56	14.0	1.7	1.3	.1	.0	4.0
Donta Hall	PF	13	0	179	62	11	5	10	73	13.8	4.8	.8	.4	.8	5.6
Moritz Wagner^{†}	C	11	10	286	54	12	4	9	121	26.0	4.9	1.1	.4	.8	11.0
Karim Mané	PG	10	0	88	14	4	0	2	11	8.8	1.4	.4	.0	.2	1.1
Markelle Fultz	PG	8	8	215	25	43	8	2	103	26.9	3.1	5.4	1.0	.3	12.9
Ignas Brazdeikis^{†}	SF	8	0	234	41	16	4	3	89	29.3	5.1	2.0	.5	.4	11.1
Devin Cannady	PG	8	0	74	5	1	5	1	34	9.3	.6	.1	.6	.1	4.3
Sindarius Thornwell^{†}	SG	7	0	144	13	17	8	1	24	20.6	1.9	2.4	1.1	.1	3.4
Robert Franks	PF	7	0	101	14	5	3	3	43	14.4	2.0	.7	.4	.4	6.1
Frank Mason III	PG	4	1	79	12	12	0	0	25	19.8	3.0	3.0	.0	.0	6.3
Otto Porter Jr.^{†}	PF	3	0	66	14	5	4	0	24	22.0	4.7	1.7	1.3	.0	8.0

- ^{†} Denotes player spent time with another team in the season. Stats reflect time with the Magic only.

== Awards and honors ==
Player	Award	Date awarded	Ref.
R. J. Hampton	Eastern Conference Rookie of the Month (May)	May 17, 2021	
Nikola Vučević	NBA All-Star reserve (2nd appearance)	February 23, 2021	
