= 2020–21 Washington Wizards season =

Season of National Basketball Association team the Washington Wizards

- Head coach: Scott Brooks
- General manager: Tommy Sheppard
- Owners: Ted Leonsis
- Arena: Capital One Arena

Results
- Record: 34–38 (.472)
- Place: Division: 3rd (Southeast); Conference: 8th (Eastern)
- Playoff finish: First round (lost to 76ers 1–4)
- Stats at Basketball Reference

Local media
- Television: NBC Sports Washington; NBC 4
- Radio: Federal News Radio; 106.7 The Fan

The 2020–21 Washington Wizards season was the 60th season of the franchise in the National Basketball Association (NBA) and 48th in the Washington, D.C. area.

This was the first season since 2009–10 without long-time point guard and former first-overall draft pick John Wall on the roster, as he was traded to the Houston Rockets for Russell Westbrook on December 2, 2020. The trade reunited Westbrook with Wizards head coach Scott Brooks, who was Westbrook's coach from 2008 to 2015, when he played for the Oklahoma City Thunder.

The Wizards qualified for the playoffs for the first time since the 2017–18 season following a victory over the Indiana Pacers in the Play-in Tournament. They lost to the top seeded Philadelphia 76ers in five games in the first round.

Following the season, Scott Brooks and the Wizards agreed to part ways after not being able to agree to a new contract. As of the 2025–26 season, this the last time Washington qualified for the postseason.

== Draft picks ==
Round	Pick	Player	Position	Nationality	Team
1	9	Deni Avdija	SF	Israel	(Israel) Maccabi Tel Aviv B.C.
2	37	Vít Krejčí	PG	Czech Republic	(Spain) Casademont Zaragoza

With their natural selection at #9, the Wizards drafted the Israeli forward Deni Avdija. It was the first time in NBA history an Israeli had been drafted in the Top 10. With the second-round pick they acquired from the Chicago Bulls in a trade last year, the Wizards drafted the Czech guard Vít Krejčí. Later that night, the team proposed to trade Krejčí to the Oklahoma City Thunder for the rights to their #53 pick, Cassius Winston, and a future second-round pick. The trade was finalized the next day, with the rights to Krejčí and Admiral Schofield going to the Thunder in exchange for Winston and the Thunder's second-round pick (via the Memphis Grizzlies) in the 2024 NBA draft.

== Roster ==
2020–21 Washington Wizards roster
Players

Pos.	No.	Player	Height	Weight	DOB	From
F	9	Deni Avdija	6 ft 9 in (2.06 m)	210 lb (95 kg)	2001-01-03	Israel
G	3	Bradley Beal	6 ft 3 in (1.91 m)	207 lb (94 kg)	1993-06-28	Florida
F	42	Dāvis Bertāns	6 ft 10 in (2.08 m)	225 lb (102 kg)	1992-11-12	Latvia
G	17	Isaac Bonga	6 ft 8 in (2.03 m)	180 lb (82 kg)	1999-11-08	Germany
F/C	13	Thomas Bryant	6 ft 10 in (2.08 m)	248 lb (112 kg)	1997-07-31	Indiana
C	21	Daniel Gafford	6 ft 11 in (2.11 m)	235 lb (107 kg)	1998-10-01	Arkansas
F	16	Anthony Gill	6 ft 7 in (2.01 m)	230 lb (104 kg)	1992-10-17	Virginia
F	8	Rui Hachimura	6 ft 8 in (2.03 m)	230 lb (104 kg)	1998-02-08	Gonzaga
G	–	Caleb Homesley	6 ft 6 in (1.98 m)	205 lb (93 kg)	1996-11-27	Liberty
G/F	1	Chandler Hutchison	6 ft 7 in (2.01 m)	210 lb (95 kg)	1996-04-26	Boise State
C	27	Alex Len	7 ft 0 in (2.13 m)	250 lb (113 kg)	1993-06-16	Maryland
C	15	Robin Lopez	7 ft 0 in (2.13 m)	281 lb (127 kg)	1988-04-01	Stanford
G	24	Garrison Mathews (TW)	6 ft 5 in (1.96 m)	215 lb (98 kg)	1996-10-24	Lipscomb
G	19	Raul Neto	6 ft 1 in (1.85 m)	180 lb (82 kg)	1992-05-19	Brazil
G	14	Ish Smith	6 ft 0 in (1.83 m)	175 lb (79 kg)	1988-07-05	Wake Forest
G	4	Russell Westbrook	6 ft 3 in (1.91 m)	200 lb (91 kg)	1988-11-12	UCLA
G	5	Cassius Winston (TW)	6 ft 1 in (1.85 m)	185 lb (84 kg)	1998-02-28	Michigan State

Coaches
Head coach
- Scott Brooks
Assistant(s)
- Tony Brown
- Jarell Christian
- Corey Gaines
- Mike Longabardi
- Robert Pack
- Mike Terpstra

Legend
- (DP) Unsigned draft pick
- (FA) Free agent
- (S) Suspended
- (GL) On assignment to G League
- (TW) Two-way affiliate player
- Injured

Roster
Updated: May 15, 2021

== Standings ==
=== Division ===
Southeast Division	W	L	PCT	GB	Home	Road	Div	GP
y – Atlanta Hawks	41	31	.569	–	25‍–‍11	16‍–‍20	9–3	72
x – Miami Heat	40	32	.556	1.0	21‍–‍15	19‍–‍17	6–6	72
x – Washington Wizards	34	38	.472	7.0	19‍–‍17	15‍–‍21	3–9	72
pi – Charlotte Hornets	33	39	.458	8.0	18‍–‍19	15‍–‍20	8–4	72
Orlando Magic	21	51	.292	20.0	11‍–‍25	10‍–‍26	4–8	72

=== Conference ===
Eastern Conference
#	Team	W	L	PCT	GB	GP
1	c − Philadelphia 76ers *	49	23	.681	–	72
2	x – Brooklyn Nets	48	24	.667	1.0	72
3	y – Milwaukee Bucks *	46	26	.639	3.0	72
4	x – New York Knicks	41	31	.569	8.0	72
5	y – Atlanta Hawks *	41	31	.569	8.0	72
6	x – Miami Heat	40	32	.556	9.0	72
7	x – Boston Celtics	36	36	.500	13.0	72
8	x – Washington Wizards	34	38	.472	15.0	72
9	pi – Indiana Pacers	34	38	.472	15.0	72
10	pi – Charlotte Hornets	33	39	.458	16.0	72
11	Chicago Bulls	31	41	.431	18.0	72
12	Toronto Raptors	27	45	.375	22.0	72
13	Cleveland Cavaliers	22	50	.306	27.0	72
14	Orlando Magic	21	51	.292	28.0	72
15	Detroit Pistons	20	52	.278	29.0	72

Notes

- z – Clinched home court advantage for the entire playoffs
- c – Clinched home court advantage for the conference playoffs
- y – Clinched division title
- x – Clinched playoff spot
- pb – Clinched play-in spot
- o – Eliminated from playoff contention
- * – Division leader

== Game log ==
=== Regular season ===
2020–21 game log
Total: 34–38 (home: 19–17; road: 15–21)
December: 0–5 (home: 0–4; road: 0–1)

Game	Date	Team	Score	High points	High rebounds	High assists	Location Attendance	Record
1	December 23	@ Philadelphia	107–113	Bradley Beal (31)	Russell Westbrook (11)	Russell Westbrook (15)	Wells Fargo Center (0)	0–1
2	December 26	Orlando	120–130	Bradley Beal (39)	Russell Westbrook (15)	Russell Westbrook (12)	Capital One Arena (0)	0–2
3	December 27	Orlando	113–120	Bradley Beal (29)	Deni Avdija (9)	Bradley Beal (7)	Capital One Arena (0)	0–3
4	December 29	Chicago	107–115	Bradley Beal (29)	Russell Westbrook (15)	Russell Westbrook (11)	Capital One Arena (0)	0–4
5	December 31	Chicago	130–133	Beal, Bryant (29)	Russell Westbrook (10)	Russell Westbrook (11)	Capital One Arena (0)	0–5

January: 4–7 (home: 2–2; road: 2–5)

Game	Date	Team	Score	High points	High rebounds	High assists	Location Attendance	Record
6	January 1	@ Minnesota	130–109	Bradley Beal (31)	Thomas Bryant (7)	Ish Smith (9)	Target Center (0)	1–5
7	January 3	@ Brooklyn	123–122	Bradley Beal (27)	Thomas Bryant (14)	Russell Westbrook (10)	Barclays Center (0)	2–5
8	January 6	@ Philadelphia	136–141	Bradley Beal (60)	Russell Westbrook (8)	Russell Westbrook (12)	Wells Fargo Center (0)	2–6
9	January 8	@ Boston	107–116	Bradley Beal (41)	Thomas Bryant (8)	Russell Westbrook (8)	TD Garden (0)	2–7
10	January 9	Miami	124–128	Garrison Mathews (22)	Moritz Wagner (7)	Ish Smith (7)	Capital One Arena (0)	2–8
11	January 11	Phoenix	128–107	Bradley Beal (34)	Robin Lopez (11)	Bradley Beal (9)	Capital One Arena (0)	3–8
	January 13	Utah	Postponed (COVID-19) (Makeup date: March 18)					
	January 15	@ Detroit	Postponed (COVID-19) (Makeup date: April 1)					
	January 17	Cleveland	Postponed (COVID-19) (Makeup date: April 25)					
	January 18	Cleveland	Postponed (COVID-19) (Makeup date: May 14)					
	January 20	@ Charlotte	Postponed (COVID-19) (Makeup date: February 7)					
	January 22	@ Milwaukee	Postponed (COVID-19) (Makeup date: May 5)					
12	January 24	@ San Antonio	101–121	Bradley Beal (31)	Russell Westbrook (8)	Russell Westbrook (6)	AT&T Center (0)	3–9
13	January 26	@ Houston	88–107	Bradley Beal (33)	Russell Westbrook (11)	Russell Westbrook (7)	Toyota Center (0)	3–10
14	January 27	@ New Orleans	106–124	Bradley Beal (47)	Jordan Bell (11)	Bradley Beal (6)	Smoothie King Center (0)	3–11
15	January 29	Atlanta	100–116	Beal, Westbrook (26)	Alex Len (9)	Russell Westbrook (4)	Capital One Arena (0)	3–12
16	January 31	Brooklyn	149–146	Russell Westbrook (41)	Russell Westbrook (10)	Russell Westbrook (8)	Capital One Arena (0)	4–12

February: 7–6 (home: 4–3; road: 3–3)

Game	Date	Team	Score	High points	High rebounds	High assists	Location Attendance	Record
17	February 2	Portland	121–132	Bradley Beal (37)	Russell Westbrook (12)	Russell Westbrook (10)	Capital One Arena (0)	4–13
18	February 3	@ Miami	103–100	Bradley Beal (32)	Rui Hachimura (9)	Ish Smith (6)	American Airlines Arena (0)	5–13
19	February 5	@ Miami	95–122	Alex Len (18)	Robin Lopez (7)	Ish Smith (5)	American Airlines Arena (0)	5–14
20	February 7	@ Charlotte	97–119	Bradley Beal (31)	Russell Westbrook (11)	Russell Westbrook (9)	Spectrum Center (0)	5–15
21	February 8	@ Chicago	105–101	Bradley Beal (35)	Avdija, Hachimura (10)	Beal, Smith (7)	United Center (0)	6–15
22	February 10	Toronto	115–137	Bradley Beal (24)	Avdija, Hachimura (7)	Russell Westbrook (7)	Capital One Arena (0)	6–16
23	February 12	New York	91–109	Russell Westbrook (23)	Russell Westbrook (9)	Russell Westbrook (10)	Capital One Arena (0)	6–17
24	February 14	Boston	104–91	Bradley Beal (35)	Deni Avdija (10)	Russell Westbrook (11)	Capital One Arena (0)	7–17
25	February 15	Houston	131–119	Bradley Beal (37)	Russell Westbrook (13)	Russell Westbrook (15)	Capital One Arena (0)	8–17
26	February 17	Denver	130–128	Dāvis Bertāns (35)	Russell Westbrook (13)	Russell Westbrook (12)	Capital One Arena (0)	9–17
27	February 20	@ Portland	118–111	Bradley Beal (37)	Russell Westbrook (11)	Russell Westbrook (13)	Moda Center (0)	10–17
28	February 22	@ L. A. Lakers	127–124 (OT)	Bradley Beal (37)	Russell Westbrook (14)	Russell Westbrook (9)	Staples Center (0)	11–17
29	February 23	@ L. A. Clippers	116–135	Bradley Beal (28)	Russell Westbrook (9)	Bradley Beal (10)	Staples Center (0)	11–18
30	February 25	@ Denver	112–110	Bradley Beal (33)	Russell Westbrook (10)	Russell Westbrook (10)	Ball Arena (0)	12–18
31	February 27	@ Minnesota	128–112	Bradley Beal (34)	Russell Westbrook (14)	Russell Westbrook (12)	Capital One Arena (0)	13–18
32	February 28	@ Boston	110–111	Bradley Beal (46)	Russell Westbrook (11)	Russell Westbrook (4)	TD Garden (0)	13–19

March: 4–9 (home: 4–6; road: 0–3)

Game	Date	Team	Score	High points	High rebounds	High assists	Location Attendance	Record
33	March 2	Memphis	111–125	Beal, Westbrook (23)	Avdija, Len (7)	Russell Westbrook (15)	Capital One Arena (0)	13–20
34	March 4	L. A. Clippers	119–117	Bradley Beal (33)	Russell Westbrook (9)	Russell Westbrook (11)	Capital One Arena (0)	14–20
35	March 10	@ Memphis	112–127	Bradley Beal (21)	Avdija, Hachimura, Lopez (6)	Russell Westbrook (10)	FedExForum (1,912)	14–21
36	March 12	Philadelphia	105–127	Russell Westbrook (25)	Avdija, Lopez, Westbrook (5)	Russell Westbrook (8)	Capital One Arena (0)	14–22
37	March 13	Milwaukee	119–125	Rui Hachimura (29)	Rui Hachimura (11)	Russell Westbrook (12)	Capital One Arena (0)	14–23
38	March 15	Milwaukee	122–133	Bradley Beal (37)	Rui Hachimura (7)	Russell Westbrook (17)	Capital One Arena (0)	14–24
39	March 17	Sacramento	119–121	Bradley Beal (29)	Russell Westbrook (14)	Russell Westbrook (10)	Capital One Arena (0)	14–25
40	March 18	Utah	131–122	Bradley Beal (43)	Russell Westbrook (15)	Russell Westbrook (13)	Capital One Arena (0)	15–25
41	March 21	@ Brooklyn	106–113	Russell Westbrook (29)	Russell Westbrook (13)	Russell Westbrook (13)	Barclays Center (0)	15–26
42	March 23	@ New York	113–131	Bradley Beal (22)	Rui Hachimura (7)	Russell Westbrook (12)	Madison Square Garden (1,589)	15–27
43	March 25	@ New York	102–106	Bradley Beal (26)	Russell Westbrook (18)	Beal, Westbrook (9)	Madison Square Garden (1,817)	15–28
44	March 27	Detroit	106–92	Russell Westbrook (19)	Russell Westbrook (19)	Russell Westbrook (10)	Capital One Arena (0)	16–28
45	March 29	Indiana	132–124	Russell Westbrook (35)	Russell Westbrook (14)	Russell Westbrook (21)	Capital One Arena (0)	17–28
46	March 30	Charlotte	104–114	Rui Hachimura (30)	Russell Westbrook (15)	Russell Westbrook (14)	Capital One Arena (0)	17–29

April: 12–5 (home: 6–2; road: 6–3)

Game	Date	Team	Score	High points	High rebounds	High assists	Location Attendance	Record
47	April 1	@ Detroit	91–120	Lopez, Westbrook (16)	Russell Westbrook (11)	Russell Westbrook (12)	Little Caesars Arena (750)	17–30
48	April 3	Dallas	87–109	Russell Westbrook (26)	Russell Westbrook (14)	Russell Westbrook (5)	Capital One Arena (0)	17–31
49	April 5	@ Toronto	101–103	Russell Westbrook (23)	Russell Westbrook (14)	Russell Westbrook (11)	Amalie Arena (1,620)	17–32
50	April 7	Orlando	116–113	Bradley Beal (26)	Russell Westbrook (14)	Russell Westbrook (15)	Amway Center (3,991)	18–32
51	April 9	@ Golden State	110–107	Bradley Beal (20)	Russell Westbrook (14)	Russell Westbrook (14)	Chase Center (0)	19–32
52	April 10	@ Phoenix	106–134	Raul Neto (24)	Russell Westbrook (11)	Russell Westbrook (14)	Phoenix Suns Arena (5,028)	19–33
53	April 12	@ Utah	125–121	Bradley Beal (34)	Russell Westbrook (14)	Russell Westbrook (14)	Vivint Arena (5,546)	20–33
54	April 14	@ Sacramento	123–111	Bradley Beal (31)	Russell Westbrook (15)	Russell Westbrook (11)	Golden 1 Center (0)	21–33
55	April 16	New Orleans	117–115 (OT)	Bradley Beal (30)	Russell Westbrook (15)	Russell Westbrook (9)	Capital One Arena (0)	22–33
56	April 17	Detroit	121–100	Bradley Beal (37)	Russell Westbrook (14)	Russell Westbrook (11)	Capital One Arena (0)	23–33
57	April 19	Oklahoma City	119–107	Bradley Beal (30)	Russell Westbrook (11)	Russell Westbrook (17)	Capital One Arena (0)	24–33
58	April 21	Golden State	118–114	Bradley Beal (29)	Russell Westbrook (20)	Russell Westbrook (10)	Capital One Arena (2,133)	25–33
59	April 22	@ Oklahoma City	129–109	Russell Westbrook (37)	Russell Westbrook (11)	Russell Westbrook (11)	Chesapeake Energy Arena (0)	26–33
60	April 25	Cleveland	119–110	Bradley Beal (33)	Beal, Gafford (6)	Russell Westbrook (11)	Capital One Arena (2,133)	27–33
61	April 26	San Antonio	143–146	Bradley Beal (45)	Russell Westbrook (13)	Russell Westbrook (14)	Capital One Arena (2,133)	27–34
62	April 28	L. A. Lakers	116–107	Bradley Beal (27)	Russell Westbrook (18)	Russell Westbrook (14)	Capital One Arena (2,133)	28–34
63	April 30	@ Cleveland	122–93	Bradley Beal (19)	Russell Westbrook (12)	Russell Westbrook (11)	Rocket Mortgage FieldHouse (4,148)	29–34

May: 5–4 (home: 3–0; road: 2–4)

Game	Date	Team	Score	High points	High rebounds	High assists	Location Attendance	Record
64	May 1	@ Dallas	124–125	Russell Westbrook (42)	Russell Westbrook (10)	Russell Westbrook (9)	American Airlines Center (4,351)	29–35
65	May 3	Indiana	154–141	Rui Hachimura (27)	Russell Westbrook (21)	Russell Westbrook (24)	Capital One Arena (2,133)	30–35
66	May 5	@ Milwaukee	134–135	Bradley Beal (42)	Russell Westbrook (12)	Russell Westbrook (17)	Fiserv Forum (3,280)	30–36
67	May 6	@ Toronto	131–129	Bradley Beal (28)	Russell Westbrook (17)	Russell Westbrook (17)	Amalie Arena (2,494)	31–36
68	May 8	@ Indiana	133–132 (OT)	Bradley Beal (50)	Russell Westbrook (19)	Russell Westbrook (15)	Bankers Life Fieldhouse (0)	32–36
69	May 10	@ Atlanta	124–125	Russell Westbrook (28)	Russell Westbrook (13)	Russell Westbrook (21)	State Farm Arena (3,054)	32–37
70	May 12	@ Atlanta	116–120	Russell Westbrook (34)	Alex Len (10)	Russell Westbrook (15)	State Farm Arena (3,120)	32–38
71	May 14	Cleveland	120–105	Russell Westbrook (21)	Russell Westbrook (12)	Russell Westbrook (17)	Capital One Arena (5,333)	33–38
72	May 16	Charlotte	115–110	Bradley Beal (25)	Russell Westbrook (15)	Russell Westbrook (10)	Capital One Arena (5,333)	34–38

2020–21 season schedule

=== Play-in ===
2021 play-in game log
Total: 1–1 (home: 1–0; road: 0–1)
Play-in: 1–1 (home: 1–0; road: 0–1)

Game	Date	Team	Score	High points	High rebounds	High assists	Location Attendance	Record
1	May 18	@ Boston	L 100–118	Bradley Beal (22)	Russell Westbrook (14)	Bradley Beal (6)	TD Garden (4,789)	0–1
2	May 20	Indiana	W 142–115	Bradley Beal (25)	Daniel Gafford (13)	Russell Westbrook (15)	Capital One Arena (0)	1–1

=== Playoffs ===
2021 playoff game log
Total: 1–4 (home: 1–1; road: 0–3)
First Round: 1–4 (home: 1–1; road: 0–3)

Game	Date	Team	Score	High points	High rebounds	High assists	Location Attendance	Series
1	May 23	@ Philadelphia	L 118–125	Bradley Beal (33)	Bradley Beal (10)	Russell Westbrook (14)	Wells Fargo Center (11,160)	0–1
2	May 26	@ Philadelphia	L 95–120	Bradley Beal (33)	Rui Hachimura (7)	Russell Westbrook (11)	Wells Fargo Center (11,160)	0–2
3	May 29	Philadelphia	L 103–132	Russell Westbrook (26)	Russell Westbrook (12)	Russell Westbrook (10)	Capital One Arena (10,665)	0–3
4	May 31	Philadelphia	W 122–114	Bradley Beal (27)	Russell Westbrook (21)	Russell Westbrook (14)	Capital One Arena (10,665)	1–3
5	June 2	@ Philadelphia	L 112–129	Bradley Beal (32)	Russell Westbrook (8)	Russell Westbrook (10)	Wells Fargo Center (15,523)	1–4

2021 playoff schedule

== Player statistics ==
Legend
GP	Games played	GS	Games started	MPG	Minutes per game
FG%	Field-goal percentage	3P%	3-point field-goal percentage	FT%	Free-throw percentage
RPG	Rebounds per game	APG	Assists per game	SPG	Steals per game
BPG	Blocks per game	PPG	Points per game

=== Regular season ===
Washington Wizards statistics
Player	GP	GS	MPG	FG%	3P%	FT%	RPG	APG	SPG	BPG	PPG
Robin Lopez	71	9	19.1	.633	.278	.723	3.8	.8	.2	.6	9.0
Russell Westbrook	65	65	36.4	.439	.315	.656	11.5	11.7	1.4	.4	22.2
Garrison Mathews	64	24	16.2	.409	.384	.884	1.4	.4	.5	.1	5.5
Raul Neto	64	22	21.9	.468	.390	.882	2.4	2.3	1.1	.1	8.7
Bradley Beal	60	60	35.8	.485	.349	.889	4.7	4.4	1.2	.4	31.3
Rui Hachimura	57	57	31.5	.478	.328	.770	5.5	1.4	.8	.1	13.8
Alex Len^{†}	57	40	15.8	.619	.263	.636	4.4	.8	.3	1.0	7.1
Dāvis Bertāns	57	7	25.7	.404	.395	.870	2.9	.9	.6	.2	11.5
Deni Avdija	54	32	23.3	.417	.315	.644	4.9	1.2	.6	.3	6.3
Ish Smith	44	1	21.0	.434	.367	.576	3.4	3.9	.7	.3	6.7
Isaac Bonga	40	8	10.8	.370	.277	.625	1.7	.6	.3	.2	2.0
Anthony Gill	26	4	8.4	.500	.292	.813	2.0	.4	.4	.2	3.1
Moritz Wagner^{†}	25	13	15.0	.508	.310	.788	2.9	1.3	.9	.3	7.1
Daniel Gafford^{†}	23	0	17.7	.681		.672	5.6	.5	.7	1.8	10.1
Cassius Winston	22	0	4.5	.424	.471	.833	.4	.5	.1	.0	1.9
Troy Brown Jr.^{†}	21	0	13.7	.371	.304	.667	2.9	.9	.1	.2	4.3
Chandler Hutchison^{†}	18	1	15.7	.400	.368	.826	3.2	.7	.6	.3	5.2
Jerome Robinson	17	6	17.9	.295	.262	.800	2.2	1.5	.7	.4	4.9
Thomas Bryant	10	10	27.1	.648	.429	.667	6.1	1.5	.4	.8	14.3
Jordan Bell^{†}	5	1	13.4	.350	.000		3.8	1.0	.6	.6	2.8
Anžejs Pasečņiks	1	0	6.0	.000	.000		1.0	1.0	.0	.0	.0

=== Playoffs ===
Washington Wizards statistics
Player	GP	GS	MPG	FG%	3P%	FT%	RPG	APG	SPG	BPG	PPG
Bradley Beal	5	5	39.0	.455	.219	.861	6.2	4.2	.8	.6	30.0
Russell Westbrook	5	5	37.2	.333	.250	.791	10.4	11.8	.4	.2	19.0
Rui Hachimura	5	5	34.6	.617	.600	.583	7.2	1.0	.4	.2	14.8
Raul Neto	5	3	22.4	.353	.267	.800	2.2	1.0	.4	.0	6.4
Alex Len	5	3	8.4	.571		.571	2.2	.4	.2	.0	4.0
Daniel Gafford	5	2	23.4	.846		.625	5.8	.6	1.0	2.0	11.8
Ish Smith	5	0	22.2	.372	.286		3.2	2.8	1.4	.4	6.8
Robin Lopez	5	0	14.6	.720		.250	1.8	.0	.0	.8	7.4
Dāvis Bertāns	4	2	26.5	.407	.348	1.000	2.8	.3	.3	.5	9.3
Anthony Gill	4	0	8.3	.000	.000		1.0	.0	.0	.0	.0
Isaac Bonga	4	0	2.5	.000	.000		.0	.0	.0	.3	.0
Garrison Mathews	3	0	5.7	.000	.000	.800	.7	.0	.0	.0	1.3
Chandler Hutchison	2	0	9.0	.400		1.000	1.5	.5	.0	.0	3.0
Cassius Winston	1	0	5.0	.333	.000		2.0	1.0	.0	.0	2.0

- ^{†} Denotes player spent time with another team in the season. Stats reflect time with the Wizards only.

== Transactions ==
=== Trades ===
November 19, 2020	To Washington Wizards: Draft rights to Cassius Winston (#53); Second-round pick in the 2024 NBA draft	To Oklahoma City Thunder: Draft rights to Vít Krejčí (#37); Admiral Schofield	
December 2, 2020	To Washington Wizards: Russell Westbrook	To Houston Rockets: John Wall; Protected first-round pick in the 2023 NBA draft	
March 25, 2021	To Washington Wizards: Daniel Gafford; Chandler Hutchison	To Chicago Bulls: Daniel Theis; Javonte Green; Troy Brown Jr.; Cash Considerations	To Boston Celtics: Moritz Wagner; Luke Kornet

=== Re-signed ===
Player	Date Signed	Contract	Ref.
Davis Bertans	November 20, 2020	5 years, $80M	
Garrison Mathews	November 22, 2020	Two-Way	

=== Additions ===
Player	Date Signed	Contract	Former Team	Ref.
Robin Lopez	November 20, 2020	1 year (MLE)	Milwaukee Bucks	
Anthony Gill	November 20, 2020	2 years	(Russia) Khimki	
Raul Neto	November 22, 2020	1 year	Philadelphia 76ers	
Alex Len	January 23, 2021	1 year	Toronto Raptors	
Jordan Bell	January 23, 2021; April 14, 2021 (Note: Bell was signed to two separate 10-Day contracts)	Hardship Exception, 10-Day Contract		
Caleb Homesley	May 15, 2021	Multi-year (unspecified)	Erie BayHawks	

=== Subtractions ===
Player	Date Left	Reason Left	New Team	Ref.
Johnathan Williams	September 6, 2020	RFA, no offer	(Turkey) Galatasaray	
Gary Payton II	November 21, 2020	UFA	Raptors 905	
Jarrod Uthoff	November 21, 2020	UFA	New Orleans Pelicans	
Shabazz Napier	November 21, 2020	UFA		
Ian Mahinmi	November 21, 2020	UFA		
Jerian Grant	November 21, 2020	UFA	Houston Rockets	
Anžejs Pasečņiks	January 18, 2021	Released		
Jordan Bell	January 31, 2021; April 24, 2021	10-Day Contract	Erie BayHawks; Golden State Warriors	
Jerome Robinson	April 8, 2021	Waived		
