= 2020–21 Toronto Raptors season =

NBA professional basketball team season

- Head coach: Nick Nurse
- President: Masai Ujiri
- General manager: Bobby Webster
- Owners: Maple Leaf Sports & Entertainment
- Arena: Amalie Arena

Results
- Record: 27–45 (.375)
- Place: Division: 5th (Atlantic); Conference: 12th (Eastern)
- Playoff finish: Did not qualify
- Stats at Basketball Reference

Local media
- Television: TSN; Sportsnet

The 2020–21 Toronto Raptors season was the 26th season of the franchise in the National Basketball Association (NBA). The 2019–20 Raptors finished the season with a 53–19 record (in a shortened season due to the COVID-19 pandemic), and lost in the Conference Semifinals to the Boston Celtics.

For the 2020–21 season, the Raptors played a shortened 72-game season, as the season start was delayed until December. The Raptors needed a temporary home arena as a result of travel restrictions placed by the Canadian government due to the COVID-19 pandemic. On November 20, the Raptors announced that they would be beginning the 2020–21 season at Amalie Arena in Tampa, Florida, (the home of the National Hockey League's Tampa Bay Lightning); they also considered the Bridgestone Arena in Nashville (home of the Nashville Predators), the KeyBank Center in Buffalo (home of the Buffalo Sabres), the T-Mobile Center in Kansas City, the Prudential Center in Newark (home of the New Jersey Devils), or the KFC Yum! Center in Louisville (home of the Louisville Cardinals). This would be the first season since 1995 (prior to the expansion of the Raptors and Vancouver Grizzlies) not to have NBA regular-season games played in Canada following the Raptors' announcement on February 11, 2021, that they will finish the 2020–21 season in Tampa, as a result of further border restrictions. It was also the first time since 2007 an NBA team has been temporarily displaced from their home city since the New Orleans Hornets were relocated to Oklahoma City due to the damage inflicted by Hurricane Katrina on stadiums in 2005. With a few exceptions, the Raptors played home games behind closed doors for the duration of the season. As with the Toronto Blue Jays (and unlike the Hornets) the Raptors did not change their geographical name on account of their temporary re-location.

The Raptors struggled with injuries throughout the season. On May 10, the Raptors were eliminated from playoff contention, ending their seven-year playoff streak and suffered their worst record since the 2011–12 season. This was the first season under Nurse where the Raptors missed the playoffs.

This was the final season as a Raptor for longtime point guard and six-time NBA All-Star Kyle Lowry, who signed with the Miami Heat in August 2021.

== Draft ==
Round	Pick	Player	Position	Nationality	College
1	29	Malachi Flynn	PG	USA	San Diego State
2	59	Jalen Harris	SG	USA	Nevada

The Raptors held one first-round pick and one second-round pick in the draft. Because the Raptors had the second-best record in the league, their selections were made at 29th in the first and second round, respectively. With the 29th pick, they selected Malachi Flynn. With the 59th pick, they selected Jalen Harris.

== Roster ==
2020–21 Toronto Raptors roster
Players

Pos.	No.	Player	Height	Weight	DOB	From
F	3	OG Anunoby	6 ft 7 in (2.01 m)	232 lb (105 kg)	1997-07-17	Indiana
C	46	Aron Baynes	6 ft 10 in (2.08 m)	260 lb (118 kg)	1986-12-09	Washington State
G/F	95	DeAndre' Bembry	6 ft 5 in (1.96 m)	210 lb (95 kg)	1994-07-04	Saint Joseph's
C	24	Khem Birch	6 ft 9 in (2.06 m)	233 lb (106 kg)	1992-09-28	UNLV
F	25	Chris Boucher	6 ft 10 in (2.08 m)	215 lb (98 kg)	1993-01-11	Oregon
G	8	Malachi Flynn	6 ft 1 in (1.85 m)	175 lb (79 kg)	1998-05-10	San Diego State
C	55	Freddie Gillespie	6 ft 9 in (2.06 m)	245 lb (111 kg)	1997-06-14	Baylor
G	2	Jalen Harris (TW)	6 ft 5 in (1.96 m)	195 lb (88 kg)	1998-09-14	Nevada
G/F	32	Rodney Hood	6 ft 8 in (2.03 m)	208 lb (94 kg)	1992-10-20	Duke
G/F	5	Stanley Johnson	6 ft 6 in (1.98 m)	242 lb (110 kg)	1996-05-29	Arizona
G	7	Kyle Lowry	6 ft 0 in (1.83 m)	196 lb (89 kg)	1986-03-25	Villanova
F	43	Pascal Siakam	6 ft 9 in (2.06 m)	230 lb (104 kg)	1994-04-02	New Mexico State
G	33	Gary Trent	6 ft 5 in (1.96 m)	209 lb (95 kg)	1999-01-18	Duke
G	23	Fred VanVleet	6 ft 1 in (1.85 m)	197 lb (89 kg)	1994-02-25	Wichita State
F	18	Yuta Watanabe	6 ft 9 in (2.06 m)	215 lb (98 kg)	1994-10-13	George Washington
G	1	Paul Watson	6 ft 6 in (1.98 m)	210 lb (95 kg)	1994-12-30	Fresno State

Coaches
Head coach
- Nick Nurse
Assistant(s)
- Jon Goodwillie
- Adrian Griffin
- Jama Mahlalela
- Jim Sann
- Sergio Scariolo

Legend
- (DP) Unsigned draft pick
- (FA) Free agent
- (S) Suspended
- (GL) On assignment to G League affiliate
- (TW) Two-way affiliate player
- Injured

Roster
Updated: May 16, 2021

== Standings ==
=== Division ===
Atlantic Division	W	L	PCT	GB	Home	Road	Div	GP
c − Philadelphia 76ers	49	23	.681	–	29‍–‍7	20‍–‍16	10–2	72
x – Brooklyn Nets	48	24	.667	1.0	28‍–‍8	20‍–‍16	8–4	72
x – New York Knicks	41	31	.569	8.0	25‍–‍11	16‍–‍20	4–8	72
x – Boston Celtics	36	36	.500	13.0	21‍–‍15	15‍–‍21	4–8	72
Toronto Raptors	27	45	.375	22.0	16‍–‍20	11‍–‍25	4–8	72

=== Conference ===
Eastern Conference
#	Team	W	L	PCT	GB	GP
1	c − Philadelphia 76ers *	49	23	.681	–	72
2	x – Brooklyn Nets	48	24	.667	1.0	72
3	y – Milwaukee Bucks *	46	26	.639	3.0	72
4	x – New York Knicks	41	31	.569	8.0	72
5	y – Atlanta Hawks *	41	31	.569	8.0	72
6	x – Miami Heat	40	32	.556	9.0	72
7	x – Boston Celtics	36	36	.500	13.0	72
8	x – Washington Wizards	34	38	.472	15.0	72
9	pi – Indiana Pacers	34	38	.472	15.0	72
10	pi – Charlotte Hornets	33	39	.458	16.0	72
11	Chicago Bulls	31	41	.431	18.0	72
12	Toronto Raptors	27	45	.375	22.0	72
13	Cleveland Cavaliers	22	50	.306	27.0	72
14	Orlando Magic	21	51	.292	28.0	72
15	Detroit Pistons	20	52	.278	29.0	72

Notes

- z – Clinched home court advantage for the entire playoffs
- c – Clinched home court advantage for the conference playoffs
- y – Clinched division title
- x – Clinched playoff spot
- pb – Clinched play-in spot
- o – Eliminated from playoff contention
- * – Division leader

== Game log ==
=== Preseason ===
2020 pre-season game log
Total: 2–1 (Home: 0–1; Road: 2–0)
Preseason: 2–1 (home: 0–1; road: 2–0)

Game	Date	Team	Score	High points	High rebounds	High assists	Location Attendance	Record
1	December 12	@ Charlotte	W 111–100	Matt Thomas (16)	Anunoby, Baynes (5)	Thomas, VanVleet (5)	Spectrum Center	1–0
2	December 14	@ Charlotte	W 112–109	Fred VanVleet (23)	Chris Boucher (8)	Fred VanVleet (4)	Spectrum Center	2–0
3	December 18	Miami	L 105–117	Kyle Lowry (25)	Pascal Siakam (9)	Fred VanVleet (7)	Amalie Arena	2–1

2020–21 season schedule

=== Regular season ===
2020–21 game log
Total: 27–45 (Home: 16–20; Road: 11–25)
December: 1–3 (home: 1–1; road: 0–2)

Game	Date	Team	Score	High points	High rebounds	High assists	Location Attendance	Record
1	December 23	New Orleans	L 99–113	Pascal Siakam (20)	Aron Baynes (9)	Kyle Lowry (10)	Amalie Arena; 3,800	0–1
2	December 26	@ San Antonio	L 114–119	Fred VanVleet (27)	Pascal Siakam (15)	Kyle Lowry (10)	AT&T Center; 0	0–2
3	December 29	@ Philadelphia	L 93–100	Kyle Lowry (24)	Johnson, Lowry (8)	Kyle Lowry (9)	Wells Fargo Center; 0	0–3
4	December 31	New York	W 100–83	Fred VanVleet (25)	Chris Boucher (9)	Fred VanVleet (7)	Amalie Arena; 3,449	1–3

January: 7–9 (home: 5–4; road: 2–5)

Game	Date	Team	Score	High points	High rebounds	High assists	Location Attendance	Record
5	January 2	@ New Orleans	L 116–120	Fred VanVleet (27)	Fred VanVleet (8)	Kyle Lowry (8)	Smoothie King Center; 750	1–4
6	January 4	Boston	L 114–126	Fred VanVleet (35)	Fred VanVleet (8)	Kyle Lowry (5)	Amalie Arena; 3,740	1–5
7	January 6	@ Phoenix	L 115–123	Pascal Siakam (32)	Lowry, Siakam (9)	Fred VanVleet (7)	Phoenix Suns Arena; 0	1–6
8	January 8	@ Sacramento	W 144–123	Fred VanVleet (34)	Chris Boucher (10)	Pascal Siakam (12)	Golden 1 Center; 0	2–6
9	January 10	@ Golden State	L 105–106	Pascal Siakam (25)	Pascal Siakam (11)	Kyle Lowry (6)	Chase Center; 0	2–7
10	January 11	@ Portland	L 111–112	Pascal Siakam (22)	Pascal Siakam (13)	Pascal Siakam (10)	Moda Center; 0	2–8
11	January 14	Charlotte	W 111–108	Chris Boucher (25)	Chris Boucher (10)	Kyle Lowry (12)	Amalie Arena; 0	3–8
12	January 16	Charlotte	W 116–113	Norman Powell (24)	Chris Boucher (9)	Fred VanVleet (10)	Amalie Arena; 0	4–8
13	January 18	Dallas	W 116–93	Kyle Lowry (23)	OG Anunoby (11)	Kyle Lowry (7)	Amalie Arena; 0	5–8
14	January 20	Miami	L 102–111	Fred VanVleet (24)	Kyle Lowry (10)	Fred VanVleet (9)	Amalie Arena; 0	5–9
15	January 22	Miami	W 101–81	Norman Powell (23)	Pascal Siakam (14)	Fred VanVleet (7)	Amalie Arena; 0	6–9
16	January 24	@ Indiana	W 107–102	OG Anunoby (30)	OG Anunoby (8)	Norman Powell (6)	Bankers Life Fieldhouse; 0	7–9
17	January 25	@ Indiana	L 114–129	Fred VanVleet (25)	Chris Boucher (9)	Johnson, Powell, VanVleet (6)	Bankers Life Fieldhouse; 0	7–10
18	January 27	Milwaukee	L 108–115	Norman Powell (26)	Pascal Siakam (9)	Fred VanVleet (10)	Amalie Arena; 0	7–11
19	January 29	Sacramento	L 124–126	Pascal Siakam (32)	Aron Baynes (10)	Lowry, VanVleet (6)	Amalie Arena; 0	7–12
20	January 31	Orlando	W 115–102	Pascal Siakam (30)	Aron Baynes (16)	Kyle Lowry (15)	Amalie Arena; 0	8–12

February: 9–5 (home: 2–2; road: 7–3)

Game	Date	Team	Score	High points	High rebounds	High assists	Location Attendance	Record
21	February 2	@ Orlando	W 123–108	Fred VanVleet (54)	Kyle Lowry (10)	Kyle Lowry (10)	Amway Center; 3,211	9–12
22	February 5	@ Brooklyn	W 123–117	Pascal Siakam (33)	Pascal Siakam (11)	Kyle Lowry (7)	Barclays Center; 0	10–12
23	February 6	@ Atlanta	L 121–132	Chris Boucher (29)	Chris Boucher (10)	Fred VanVleet (10)	State Farm Arena; 991	10–13
24	February 8	@ Memphis	W 128–113	Siakam, VanVleet (32)	Chris Boucher (10)	Fred VanVleet (9)	FedExForum; 1,844	11–13
25	February 10	@ Washington	W 137–115	Norman Powell (28)	Chris Boucher (15)	Fred VanVleet (7)	Capital One Arena; 0	12–13
26	February 11	@ Boston	L 106–120	Kyle Lowry (24)	Aron Baynes (8)	Fred VanVleet (11)	TD Garden; 0	12–14
27	February 14	Minnesota	L 112–116	Kyle Lowry (24)	Pascal Siakam (8)	Siakam, VanVleet (6)	Amalie Arena; 0	12–15
28	February 16	@ Milwaukee	W 124–113	Fred VanVleet (33)	Pascal Siakam (13)	Fred VanVleet (7)	Fiserv Forum; 250	13–15
29	February 18	@ Milwaukee	W 110–96	Norman Powell (29)	Anunoby, Boucher (7)	Fred VanVleet (8)	Fiserv Forum; 500	14–15
30	February 19	@ Minnesota	W 86–81	Norman Powell (31)	Baynes, Siakam (9)	Pascal Siakam (6)	Target Center; 0	15–15
31	February 21	Philadelphia	W 110–103	Siakam, VanVleet (23)	Pascal Siakam (7)	Fred VanVleet (9)	Amalie Arena; 0	16–15
32	February 23	Philadelphia	L 102–109	Norman Powell (24)	Fred VanVleet (8)	Fred VanVleet (8)	Amalie Arena; 0	16–16
33	February 24	@ Miami	L 108–116	Lowry, VanVleet (24)	Kyle Lowry (7)	Kyle Lowry (8)	American Airlines Arena; 0	16–17
34	February 26	Houston	W 122–111	Norman Powell (30)	Kyle Lowry (11)	Kyle Lowry (10)	Amalie Arena; 0	17–17
—	February 28	Chicago	Postponed due to COVID-19. Makeup date: April 8.					

March: 1–13 (home: 1–5; road: 0–8)

Game	Date	Team	Score	High points	High rebounds	High assists	Location Attendance	Record
—	March 2	Detroit	Postponed due to COVID-19. Makeup date: March 3.					
35	March 3	Detroit	L 105–129	Norman Powell (36)	Chris Boucher (8)	Kyle Lowry (6)	Amalie Arena; 0	17–18
36	March 4	@ Boston	L 125–132	Chris Boucher (30)	Aron Baynes (9)	Kyle Lowry (19)	TD Garden; 0	17–19
37	March 11	Atlanta	L 120–121	Norman Powell (33)	Aron Baynes (15)	Kyle Lowry (12)	Amalie Arena; 0	17–20
38	March 13	@ Charlotte	L 104–114	Kyle Lowry (19)	Henry Ellenson (9)	Kyle Lowry (8)	Spectrum Center; 2,861	17–21
39	March 14	@ Chicago	L 95–118	Norman Powell (32)	Baynes, Lowry (5)	Kyle Lowry (8)	United Center; 0	17–22
40	March 17	@ Detroit	L 112–116	Norman Powell (43)	Kyle Lowry (6)	Kyle Lowry (15)	Little Caesars Arena; 750	17–23
41	March 19	Utah	L 112–115	Pascal Siakam (27)	Fred VanVleet (6)	Siakam, VanVleet (9)	Amalie Arena; N/A (Note: Spectators were in attendance, but the exact number was not reported.)	17–24
42	March 21	@ Cleveland	L 105–116	Fred VanVleet (23)	Aron Baynes (9)	Fred VanVleet (7)	Rocket Mortgage FieldHouse; N/A	17–25
43	March 22	@ Houston	L 99–117	Fred VanVleet (27)	Boucher, Siakam (10)	Kyle Lowry (8)	Toyota Center; 2,965	17–26
44	March 24	Denver	W 135–111	Pascal Siakam (27)	Pascal Siakam (8)	Kyle Lowry (9)	Amalie Arena; 1,578	18–26
45	March 26	Phoenix	L 100–104	Pascal Siakam (26)	Pascal Siakam (11)	Lowry, Siakam (6)	Amalie Arena; N/A	18–27
46	March 28	Portland	L 117–122	Pascal Siakam (26)	Chris Boucher (11)	Fred VanVleet (8)	Amalie Arena; 2,021	18–28
47	March 29	@ Detroit	L 104–118	Fred VanVleet (22)	Pascal Siakam (6)	Siakam, Trent Jr. (5)	Little Caesars Arena; 750	18–29
48	March 31	@ Oklahoma City	L 103–113	Gary Trent Jr. (31)	OG Anunoby (11)	Fred VanVleet (7)	Chesapeake Energy Arena; 0	18–30

April: 8–7 (home: 7–4; road: 1–3)

Game	Date	Team	Score	High points	High rebounds	High assists	Location Attendance	Record
49	April 2	Golden State	W 130–77	Pascal Siakam (36)	Yuta Watanabe (8)	Flynn, Siakam (5)	Amalie Arena; 3,085	19–30
50	April 5	Washington	W 103–101	Pascal Siakam (22)	Aron Baynes (8)	DeAndre' Bembry (5)	Amalie Arena; 1,620	20–30
51	April 6	L. A. Lakers	L 101–110	Pascal Siakam (27)	Boucher, Flynn (8)	Malachi Flynn (4)	Amalie Arena; N/A	20–31
52	April 8	Chicago	L 113–122	Chris Boucher (38)	Chris Boucher (19)	Malachi Flynn (7)	Amalie Arena; N/A	20–32
53	April 10	@ Cleveland	W 135–115	Gary Trent Jr. (44)	Gary Trent Jr. (7)	Malachi Flynn (11)	Rocket Mortgage FieldHouse; 4,148	21–32
54	April 11	@ New York	L 96–102	Gary Trent Jr. (23)	Chris Boucher (12)	Chris Boucher (14)	Madison Square Garden; 1,833	21–33
55	April 13	Atlanta	L 103–108	Pascal Siakam (30)	Khem Birch (7)	Pascal Siakam (7)	Amalie Arena; 1,427	21–34
56	April 14	San Antonio	W 117–112	OG Anunoby (22)	Chris Boucher (12)	Malachi Flynn (7)	Amalie Arena; 1,184	22–34
57	April 16	Orlando	W 113–102	Paul Watson Jr. (30)	Boucher, Gillespie (7)	Malachi Flynn (8)	Amalie Arena; N/A	23–34
58	April 18	Oklahoma City	W 112–106	Chris Boucher (31)	Chris Boucher (11)	Flynn, Watson Jr. (5)	Amalie Arena; N/A	24–34
59	April 21	Brooklyn	W 114–103	Pascal Siakam (27)	Pascal Siakam (9)	Pascal Siakam (6)	Amalie Arena; N/A	25–34
60	April 24	@ New York	L 103–120	Anunoby, VanVleet (27)	Birch, Lowry, Siakam (7)	Fred VanVleet (11)	Madison Square Garden; 1,981	25–35
61	April 26	Cleveland	W 112–96	Pascal Siakam (25)	Khem Birch (6)	Kyle Lowry (10)	Amalie Arena; 1,626	26–35
62	April 27	Brooklyn	L 103–116	Kyle Lowry (24)	Khem Birch (14)	Anunoby, Lowry (6)	Amalie Arena; N/A	26–36
63	April 29	@ Denver	L 111–121	OG Anunoby (25)	Khem Birch (8)	Kyle Lowry (7)	Ball Arena; 4,025	26–37

May: 1–8 (home: 0–4; road: 1–4)

Game	Date	Team	Score	High points	High rebounds	High assists	Location Attendance	Record
64	May 1	@ Utah	L 102–106	Fred VanVleet (30)	Khem Birch (10)	Fred VanVleet (7)	Vivint Arena; 6,506	26–38
65	May 2	@ L. A. Lakers	W 121–114	Pascal Siakam (39)	Pascal Siakam (13)	Kyle Lowry (11)	Staples Center; 2,053	27–38
66	May 4	@ L. A. Clippers	L 100–105	Fred VanVleet (27)	Khem Birch (8)	Fred VanVleet (13)	Staples Center; 1,714	27–39
67	May 6	Washington	L 129–131 (OT)	Pascal Siakam (44)	Pascal Siakam (11)	Pascal Siakam (7)	Amalie Arena; 2,494	27–40
68	May 8	Memphis	L 99–109	Siakam, Trent Jr. (18)	Freddie Gillespie (8)	Birch, Harris, Siakam (4)	Amalie Arena; N/A	27–41
69	May 11	L. A. Clippers	L 96–115	Chris Boucher (16)	Boucher, Gillespie (7)	Flynn, Harris (4)	Amalie Arena; N/A	27–42
70	May 13	@ Chicago	L 102–114	Stanley Johnson (35)	Stanley Johnson (10)	Malachi Flynn (7)	United Center; 3,395	27–43
71	May 14	@ Dallas	L 110–114	Jalen Harris (31)	Stanley Johnson (10)	DeAndre' Bembry (6)	American Airlines Center; 4,493	27–44
72	May 16	Indiana	L 113–125	Malachi Flynn (27)	Khem Birch (14)	Stanley Johnson (7)	Amalie Arena; N/A	27–45

2020–21 season schedule

== Player statistics ==
=== Regular season ===
Player	POS	GP	GS	MP	REB	AST	STL	BLK	PTS	MPG	RPG	APG	SPG	BPG	PPG
Stanley Johnson	PF	61	13	1,006	153	89	52	18	267	16.5	2.5	1.5	.9	.3	4.4
Chris Boucher	C	60	14	1,453	404	63	35	111	818	24.2	6.7	1.1	.6	1.9	13.6
Pascal Siakam	PF	56	56	2,006	405	250	64	37	1,196	35.8	7.2	4.5	1.1	.7	21.4
Aron Baynes	C	53	31	980	273	47	17	23	324	18.5	5.2	.9	.3	.4	6.1
Fred VanVleet	SG	52	52	1,899	220	328	87	37	1,019	36.5	4.2	6.3	1.7	.7	19.6
DeAndre' Bembry	SF	51	12	972	146	107	53	18	293	19.1	2.9	2.1	1.0	.4	5.7
Yuta Watanabe	SF	50	4	723	159	40	26	19	218	14.5	3.2	.8	.5	.4	4.4
Malachi Flynn	PG	47	14	928	116	137	38	7	353	19.7	2.5	2.9	.8	.1	7.5
Kyle Lowry	PG	46	46	1,601	247	338	45	14	791	34.8	5.4	7.3	1.0	.3	17.2
OG Anunoby	SF	43	43	1,433	237	94	66	32	682	33.3	5.5	2.2	1.5	.7	15.9
Norman Powell^{†}	SG	42	31	1,277	126	77	47	8	823	30.4	3.0	1.8	1.1	.2	19.6
Terence Davis^{†}	SG	34	4	493	66	37	17	7	234	14.5	1.9	1.1	.5	.2	6.9
Paul Watson	SF	27	2	297	45	17	6	3	111	11.0	1.7	.6	.2	.1	4.1
Matt Thomas^{†}	SG	26	0	192	21	9	2	0	71	7.4	.8	.3	.1	.0	2.7
Freddie Gillespie	PF	20	2	392	97	9	13	20	111	19.6	4.9	.5	.7	1.0	5.6
Khem Birch^{†}	C	19	17	577	144	36	16	22	227	30.4	7.6	1.9	.8	1.2	11.9
Gary Trent Jr.^{†}	SG	17	15	540	61	22	19	4	275	31.8	3.6	1.3	1.1	.2	16.2
Rodney Hood^{†}	SF	17	0	216	30	6	4	3	66	12.7	1.8	.4	.2	.2	3.9
Jalen Harris	SG	13	2	172	18	17	8	0	96	13.2	1.4	1.3	.6	.0	7.4
Alex Len^{†}	C	7	2	76	11	3	1	6	16	10.9	1.6	.4	.1	.9	2.3
Patrick McCaw	SF	5	0	33	3	4	2	0	5	6.6	.6	.8	.4	.0	1.0
Henry Ellenson	PF	2	0	38	12	5	0	0	15	19.0	6.0	2.5	.0	.0	7.5

- ^{†} Denotes player spent time with another team in the season. Stats reflect time with the Raptors only.

== Transactions ==
=== Overview ===
Players Added

Via draft

- Malachi Flynn
- Jalen Harris

Via trade

- Gary Trent Jr.
- Rodney Hood

Via free agency

- Aron Baynes
- Alex Len
- DeAndre' Bembry
- Alize Johnson
- Henry Ellenson
- Yuta Watanabe
- Donta Hall
- Freddie Gillespie
- Khem Birch
Players Lost

Via free agency

- Serge Ibaka
- Marc Gasol
- Rondae Hollis-Jefferson
- Malcolm Miller
- Donta Hall

Via trade

- Norman Powell
- Terence Davis
- Matt Thomas

Waived

- Dewan Hernandez
- Alize Johnson
- Henry Ellenson
- Oshae Brissett
- Alex Len
- Patrick McCaw

=== Trades ===
March 25, 2021	To Toronto Raptors Gary Trent Jr. Rodney Hood	To Portland Trail Blazers Norman Powell
March 25, 2021	To Toronto Raptors 2021 second-round pick (via Memphis Grizzlies)	To Sacramento Kings Terence Davis
March 25, 2021	To Toronto Raptors 2021 second-round pick (via Golden State Warriors)	To Utah Jazz Matt Thomas

=== Free Agency ===
==== Re-signed ====
Date	Player	Contract terms	Ref.
November 24	Fred VanVleet	4 year $85 million	
November 25	Chris Boucher	2 year $13.5 million	
December 1	Oshae Brissett	2 year minimum deal	
December 20	Paul Watson	1 year minimum deal	

==== Additions ====
Date	Player	Contract terms	Former team	Ref.
November 24	Aron Baynes	2 year $14.3 million	Phoenix Suns	
November 29	DeAndre' Bembry	2 year $4 million	Atlanta Hawks	
November 29	Alex Len	1 year $2.3 million	Sacramento Kings	
December 1	Henry Ellenson	2 year minimum deal	Brooklyn Nets	
December 1	Alize Johnson	1 year (Exhibit 10)	Indiana Pacers	
December 20	Yuta Watanabe	Two-way contract	Memphis Grizzlies	
February 26	Donta Hall	10-day contract	NBA G League Ignite (G League)	
April 8	Freddie Gillespie	10-day contract	Memphis Hustle (G League)	
April 10	Khem Birch	Signed for rest of season	Orlando Magic	

==== Subtractions ====
Date	Player	Reason	New Team	Ref.
November 24	Marc Gasol	Unrestricted free agent	Los Angeles Lakers	
November 25	Serge Ibaka	Unrestricted free agent	Los Angeles Clippers	
December 3	Rondae Hollis-Jefferson	Unrestricted free agent	Minnesota Timberwolves	
December 18	Malcolm Miller	Unrestricted free agent	Utah Jazz	
November 26	Dewan Hernandez	Waived	Raptors 905 (G League)	
December 20	Oshae Brissett	Waived	Fort Wayne Mad Ants (G League)	
December 20	Alize Johnson	Waived	Brooklyn Nets	
December 20	Henry Ellenson	Waived		
January 19	Alex Len	Waived	Washington Wizards	
March 8	Donta Hall	10-day contract expired	Orlando Magic	
April 9	Patrick McCaw	Waived		

== See also ==
- Effect of Hurricane Katrina on the New Orleans Hornets, a previous event of an NBA team temporarily displaced, in this instance due to Hurricane Katrina
