= 2020–21 Atlanta Hawks season =

Season of National Basketball Association team the Atlanta Hawks

- Division champions
- Head coach: Lloyd Pierce (fired); Nate McMillan (interim)
- General manager: Travis Schlenk
- Owner: Tony Ressler
- Arena: State Farm Arena

Results
- Record: 41–31 (.569)
- Place: Division: 1st (Southeast); Conference: 5th (Eastern)
- Playoff finish: Conference finals (lost to Bucks 2–4)
- Stats at Basketball Reference

Local media
- Television: Bally Sports South; Bally Sports Southeast
- Radio: 92.9 FM "The Game"

The 2020–21 Atlanta Hawks season was the 72nd season of the franchise in the National Basketball Association (NBA) and the 53rd in Atlanta. On July 21, 2020, the team unveiled its new uniforms and logo, officially retiring the look that had been in place since the 2015–16 season. On March 1, 2021, head coach Lloyd Pierce was fired after a 14–20 start and replaced by Nate McMillan, who would serve out the remainder of the year as interim head coach. On May 12, the Hawks clinched their first playoff appearance since 2017, ending their four-year playoff drought. On May 15, The Hawks clinched their first Southeast Division title since 2014–15 when the Miami Heat lost to the Milwaukee Bucks.

The Hawks surprised many on their playoff run as they went on to defeat the fourth-seeded New York Knicks in five games in the first round. Then in a major upset, the Hawks defeated the top seeded Philadelphia 76ers in seven games in the Eastern Conference Semi-finals; two of their victories involved coming back from large deficits. They advanced to the Eastern Conference finals for the first time since 2015. However, their run would come to an end as they lost in six games to the eventual champion Milwaukee Bucks in the Eastern Conference finals, coached by former Hawks coach Mike Budenholzer, who had previously led them to the Eastern Conference finals in 2015. The team is similar to the 1977–78 Seattle SuperSonics, as both teams struggled early on, made a coaching change, got a better record to surge up the standings, and had an unexpectedly deep playoff run.

== Draft picks ==
Round	Pick	Player	Position	Nationality	School/Club team
1	6	Onyeka Okongwu	PF	United States	USC
2	50	Skylar Mays	PG	United States	LSU

The Hawks entered the draft with one first-round selection and one second-round selection, the latter of which was originally owned by the Miami Heat and acquired from the Sacramento Kings. They had traded their original second-round selection to the Philadelphia 76ers in 2015.

== Roster ==
2020–21 Atlanta Hawks roster
Players

Pos.	No.	Player	Height	Weight	DOB	From
G	13	Bogdan Bogdanović	6 ft 6 in (1.98 m)	220 lb (100 kg)	1992-08-18	Serbia
C	15	Clint Capela	6 ft 10 in (2.08 m)	240 lb (109 kg)	1994-05-18	Switzerland
F	20	John Collins	6 ft 9 in (2.06 m)	235 lb (107 kg)	1997-09-23	Wake Forest
G	32	Kris Dunn (injured)	6 ft 3 in (1.91 m)	205 lb (93 kg)	1994-03-18	Providence
F/C	24	Bruno Fernando	6 ft 9 in (2.06 m)	240 lb (109 kg)	1998-08-15	Maryland
F	8	Danilo Gallinari	6 ft 10 in (2.08 m)	233 lb (106 kg)	1988-08-08	Italy
G	0	Brandon Goodwin (injured)	6 ft 0 in (1.83 m)	180 lb (82 kg)	1995-10-02	Florida Gulf Coast
F	18	Solomon Hill	6 ft 6 in (1.98 m)	226 lb (103 kg)	1991-03-18	Arizona
G	3	Kevin Huerter	6 ft 7 in (2.01 m)	190 lb (86 kg)	1998-08-27	Maryland
G/F	12	De'Andre Hunter	6 ft 8 in (2.03 m)	225 lb (102 kg)	1997-12-02	Virginia
F/C	1	Nathan Knight (TW)	6 ft 10 in (2.08 m)	253 lb (115 kg)	1997-09-20	William & Mary
G	4	Skylar Mays (TW)	6 ft 4 in (1.93 m)	205 lb (93 kg)	1997-09-05	LSU
F/C	17	Onyeka Okongwu	6 ft 10 in (2.08 m)	235 lb (107 kg)	2000-12-11	USC
G/F	22	Cam Reddish (injured)	6 ft 8 in (2.03 m)	218 lb (99 kg)	1999-09-01	Duke
G	19	Tony Snell	6 ft 6 in (1.98 m)	213 lb (97 kg)	1991-11-10	New Mexico
G	6	Lou Williams	6 ft 1 in (1.85 m)	175 lb (79 kg)	1986-10-27	South Gwinnett HS (GA)
G	11	Trae Young	6 ft 1 in (1.85 m)	180 lb (82 kg)	1998-09-19	Oklahoma

Coaches
Head coach
- Nate McMillan
Assistant(s)
- Marlon Garnett
- Matt Hill
- Melvin Hunt
- Chris Jent

Legend
- (DP) Unsigned draft pick
- (FA) Free agent
- (S) Suspended
- (GL) On assignment to G League affiliate
- (TW) Two-way affiliate player
- Injured

Roster
Updated: March 25, 2021

== Standings ==
=== Division ===
Southeast Division	W	L	PCT	GB	Home	Road	Div	GP
y – Atlanta Hawks	41	31	.569	–	25‍–‍11	16‍–‍20	9–3	72
x – Miami Heat	40	32	.556	1.0	21‍–‍15	19‍–‍17	6–6	72
x – Washington Wizards	34	38	.472	7.0	19‍–‍17	15‍–‍21	3–9	72
pi – Charlotte Hornets	33	39	.458	8.0	18‍–‍19	15‍–‍20	8–4	72
Orlando Magic	21	51	.292	20.0	11‍–‍25	10‍–‍26	4–8	72

=== Conference ===
Eastern Conference
#	Team	W	L	PCT	GB	GP
1	c − Philadelphia 76ers *	49	23	.681	–	72
2	x – Brooklyn Nets	48	24	.667	1.0	72
3	y – Milwaukee Bucks *	46	26	.639	3.0	72
4	x – New York Knicks	41	31	.569	8.0	72
5	y – Atlanta Hawks *	41	31	.569	8.0	72
6	x – Miami Heat	40	32	.556	9.0	72
7	x – Boston Celtics	36	36	.500	13.0	72
8	x – Washington Wizards	34	38	.472	15.0	72
9	pi – Indiana Pacers	34	38	.472	15.0	72
10	pi – Charlotte Hornets	33	39	.458	16.0	72
11	Chicago Bulls	31	41	.431	18.0	72
12	Toronto Raptors	27	45	.375	22.0	72
13	Cleveland Cavaliers	22	50	.306	27.0	72
14	Orlando Magic	21	51	.292	28.0	72
15	Detroit Pistons	20	52	.278	29.0	72

Notes

- z – Clinched home court advantage for the entire playoffs
- c – Clinched home court advantage for the conference playoffs
- y – Clinched division title
- x – Clinched playoff spot
- pb – Clinched play-in spot
- o – Eliminated from playoff contention
- * – Division leader

== Game log ==
=== Preseason ===
2020 preseason game log
Total: 2–2 (home: 1-1; road: 1-1)
Preseason: 2–2 (home: 1–1; road: 1–1)

Game	Date	Team	Score	High points	High rebounds	High assists	Location Attendance	Record
1	December 11	Orlando	L 112–116	De'Andre Hunter (18)	Clint Capela (14)	Trae Young (6)	State Farm Arena	0–1
2	December 13	Orlando	W 116–107	Trae Young (21)	Clint Capela (12)	Trae Young (7)	State Farm Arena	1–1
3	December 17	@ Memphis	L 106–128	De'Andre Hunter (22)	Clint Capela (9)	Rajon Rondo (7)	FedExForum	1–2
4	December 19	@ Memphis	W 117–116	Danilo Gallinari (19)	Clint Capela (7)	Bogdan Bogdanović (7)	FedExForum	2–2

2020–21 season schedule

=== Regular season ===
2020–21 game log
Total: 41–31 (home: 25–11; road: 16–20)
December: 3–1 (home: 1–0; road: 2–1)

Game	Date	Team	Score	High points	High rebounds	High assists	Location Attendance	Record
1	December 23	@ Chicago	W 124–104	Trae Young (37)	Bogdanović, Fernando (7)	Trae Young (7)	United Center; 0	1–0
2	December 26	@ Memphis	W 122–112	Trae Young (36)	De'Andre Hunter (11)	Trae Young (9)	FedExForum; 0	2–0
3	December 28	Detroit	W 128–120	Trae Young (29)	Clint Capela (9)	Rajon Rondo (8)	State Farm Arena; 0	3–0
4	December 30	@ Brooklyn	L 141–145	Young, Collins (30)	Clint Capela (12)	Trae Young (11)	Barclays Center; 0	3–1

January: 7–8 (home: 4–4; road: 3–4)

Game	Date	Team	Score	High points	High rebounds	High assists	Location Attendance	Record
5	January 1	@ Brooklyn	W 114–96	De'Andre Hunter (23)	Clint Capela (11)	Trae Young (7)	Barclays Center; 0	4–1
6	January 2	Cleveland	L 91–96	De'Andre Hunter (17)	Clint Capela (16)	Trae Young (10)	State Farm Arena; 0	4–2
7	January 4	New York	L 108–113	Trae Young (31)	Clint Capela (12)	Trae Young (14)	State Farm Arena; 0	4–3
8	January 6	Charlotte	L 94–102	John Collins (23)	Clint Capela (19)	Kevin Huerter (6)	State Farm Arena; 0	4–4
9	January 9	@ Charlotte	L 105–113	Cam Reddish (21)	Clint Capela (13)	Trae Young (10)	Spectrum Center; 0	4–5
10	January 11	Philadelphia	W 112–94	Trae Young (26)	Clint Capela (11)	Trae Young (8)	State Farm Arena; 0	5–5
—	January 13	@ Phoenix	Postponed (COVID-19) (Makeup date: March 30)					
11	January 15	@ Utah	L 92–116	Cam Reddish (20)	Clint Capela (11)	Trae Young (7)	Vivint Smart Home Arena; 1,932	5–6
12	January 16	@ Portland	L 106–112	Clint Capela (25)	Clint Capela (15)	Trae Young (11)	Moda Center; 0	5–7
13	January 18	Minnesota	W 108–97	De'Andre Hunter (25)	Clint Capela (15)	Trae Young (13)	State Farm Arena; 0	6–7
14	January 20	Detroit	W 123–115 (OT)	Trae Young (38)	Clint Capela (26)	Trae Young (10)	State Farm Arena; 0	7–7
15	January 22	@ Minnesota	W 116–98	Trae Young (43)	Clint Capela (19)	Rajon Rondo (6)	Target Center; 0	8–7
16	January 24	@ Milwaukee	L 115–129	De'Andre Hunter (33)	John Collins (7)	Rajon Rondo (7)	Fiserv Forum; 0	8–8
17	January 26	L. A. Clippers	W 108–99	Trae Young (38)	Clint Capela (18)	Trae Young (5)	State Farm Arena; 1,180	9–8
18	January 27	Brooklyn	L 128–132 (OT)	Trae Young (28)	Clint Capela (11)	Trae Young (14)	State Farm Arena; 1,008	9–9
19	January 29	@ Washington	W 116–100	Trae Young (41)	Clint Capela (14)	Trae Young (5)	Capital One Arena; 0	10–9

February: 4–11 (home: 3–5; road: 1–6)

Game	Date	Team	Score	High points	High rebounds	High assists	Location Attendance	Record
20	February 1	L. A. Lakers	L 99–107	Trae Young (25)	Clint Capela (13)	Trae Young (16)	State Farm Arena; 1,341	10–10
21	February 3	Dallas	L 116–122	John Collins (35)	Clint Capela (13)	Kevin Huerter (10)	State Farm Arena; 1,259	10–11
22	February 4	Utah	L 91–112	Kevin Huerter (16)	Clint Capela (17)	Rajon Rondo (8)	State Farm Arena; 1,261	10–12
23	February 6	Toronto	W 132–121	Trae Young (28)	Clint Capela (16)	Trae Young (13)	State Farm Arena; 991	11–12
24	February 10	Dallas	L 117–118	John Collins (33)	Collins, Huerter (8)	Trae Young (15)	American Airlines Center; 1,000	11–13
25	February 12	San Antonio	L 114–125	Trae Young (25)	Clint Capela (11)	Kevin Huerter (4)	State Farm Arena; 1,451	11–14
26	February 13	Indiana	L 113–125	Clint Capela (24)	Clint Capela (10)	Trae Young (14)	State Farm Arena; 1,393	11–15
27	February 15	@ New York	L 112–123	Trae Young (23)	Clint Capela (18)	Trae Young (8)	Madison Square Garden; 0	11–16
28	February 17	@ Boston	W 122–114	Trae Young (40)	Clint Capela (13)	Trae Young (8)	TD Garden; 0	12–16
29	February 19	@ Boston	L 109–121	Trae Young (31)	Clint Capela (15)	Trae Young (11)	TD Garden; 0	12–17
30	February 21	Denver	W 123–115	Trae Young (35)	John Collins (11)	Trae Young (15)	State Farm Arena; 1,362	13–17
31	February 23	@ Cleveland	L 111–112	Trae Young (28)	Clint Capela (16)	Trae Young (12)	Rocket Mortgage FieldHouse; 2,720	13–18
32	February 24	Boston	W 127–112	Danilo Gallinari (38)	John Collins (11)	Trae Young (7)	State Farm Arena; 1,537	14–18
33	February 26	@ Oklahoma City	L 109–118	John Collins (25)	Clint Capela (21)	Trae Young (8)	Chesapeake Energy Arena; 0	14–19
34	February 28	@ Miami	L 99–109	John Collins (34)	Clint Capela (14)	Trae Young (9)	American Airlines Arena; Limited seating	14–20

March: 9–4 (home: 3–0; road: 6–4)

Game	Date	Team	Score	High points	High rebounds	High assists	Location Attendance	Record
35	March 2	@ Miami	W 94–80	Trae Young (18)	Clint Capela (17)	Trae Young (10)	American Airlines Arena; Limited seating	15–20
36	March 3	@ Orlando	W 115–112	Trae Young (32)	Collins, Gallinari (9)	Trae Young (8)	Amway Center; 3,969	16–20
37	March 11	@ Toronto	W 121–120	Trae Young (37)	Clint Capela (18)	Trae Young (7)	Amalie Arena; 0	17–20
38	March 13	Sacramento	W 121–106	Trae Young (28)	Clint Capela (14)	Trae Young (9)	State Farm Arena; 2,347	18–20
39	March 14	Cleveland	W 100–82	John Collins (22)	John Collins (13)	Trae Young (6)	State Farm Arena; 2,322	19–20
40	March 16	@ Houston	W 119–107	Danilo Gallinari (29)	John Collins (10)	Trae Young (14)	Toyota Center; 3,069	20–20
41	March 18	Oklahoma City	W 116–93	Young, Bogdanović (23)	Danilo Gallinari (9)	Trae Young (9)	State Farm Arena; 2,621	21–20
42	March 20	@ L. A. Lakers	W 99–94	John Collins (27)	Capela, Collins (16)	Trae Young (9)	Staples Center; 0	22–20
43	March 22	@ L. A. Clippers	L 110–119	Trae Young (28)	Clint Capela (14)	Trae Young (8)	Staples Center; 0	22–21
44	March 24	@ Sacramento	L 108–110	Trae Young (29)	Clint Capela (17)	Trae Young (9)	Golden 1 Center; 0	22–22
45	March 26	@ Golden State	W 124–108	Collins (38)	Clint Capela (15)	Trae Young (15)	Chase Center; 0	23–22
46	March 28	@ Denver	L 102–126	Trae Young (21)	Clint Capela (8)	Trae Young (7)	Ball Arena; 0	23–23
47	March 30	@ Phoenix	L 110–117	Bogdan Bogdanović (22)	Clint Capela (16)	Trae Young (13)	Phoenix Suns Arena; 3,173	23–24

April: 11–6 (home: 7–2; road: 4–4)

Game	Date	Team	Score	High points	High rebounds	High assists	Location Attendance	Record
48	April 1	@ San Antonio	W 134–129	Trae Young (30)	Clint Capela (17)	Trae Young (12)	AT&T Center; 2,949	24–24
49	April 2	@ New Orleans	W 126–103	Bogdan Bogdanović (26)	Clint Capela (10)	Bogdan Bogdanović (7)	Smoothie King Center; 3,700	25–24
50	April 4	Golden State	W 117–111	Clint Capela (24)	Clint Capela (18)	Bogdan Bogdanović (5)	State Farm Arena; 2,937	26–24
51	April 6	New Orleans	W 123–107	Trae Young (30)	Clint Capela (12)	Trae Young (12)	State Farm Arena; 2,816	27–24
52	April 7	Memphis	L 113–131	Bogdan Bogdanović (24)	Onyeka Okongwu (11)	Trae Young (11)	State Farm Arena; 2,774	27–25
53	April 9	Chicago	W 120–108	Trae Young (42)	Clint Capela (10)	Trae Young (9)	State Farm Arena; 996	28–25
54	April 11	@ Charlotte	W 105–101	Bogdan Bogdanović (32)	Clint Capela (15)	Brandon Goodwin (8)	Spectrum Center; 4,148	29–25
55	April 13	@ Toronto	W 108–103	Bogdan Bogdanović (23)	Clint Capela (21)	Lou Williams (5)	Amalie Arena; 1,427	30–25
56	April 15	Milwaukee	L 109–120	Bogdan Bogdanović (28)	Clint Capela (16)	Trae Young (9)	State Farm Arena; Limited seating	30–26
57	April 18	Indiana	W 129–117	Trae Young (34)	Clint Capela (24)	Trae Young (11)	State Farm Arena; Limited seating	31–26
58	April 20	Orlando	W 112–96	Trae Young (25)	Clint Capela (19)	Trae Young (7)	State Farm Arena; 2,219	32–26
59	April 21	@ New York	L 127–137	Clint Capela (25)	Clint Capela (22)	Trae Young (14)	Madison Square Garden; 1,981	32–27
60	April 23	Miami	W 118–103	Bogdan Bogdanović (21)	John Collins (8)	Bogdan Bogdanović (8)	State Farm Arena; 2,985	33–27
61	April 25	Milwaukee	W 111–104	Bogdan Bogdanović (32)	Clint Capela (14)	Lou Williams (6)	State Farm Arena; 3,010	34–27
62	April 26	@ Detroit	L 86–100	Bogdan Bogdanović (17)	Clint Capela (15)	Brandon Goodwin (7)	Little Caesars Arena; 750	34–28
63	April 28	@ Philadelphia	L 83–127	John Collins (21)	Capela, Williams (8)	Lou Williams (5)	Wells Fargo Center; 4,094	34–29
64	April 30	@ Philadelphia	L 104–126	Trae Young (32)	Clint Capela (15)	Trae Young (4)	Wells Fargo Center; 4,094	34–30

May: 7–1 (home: 7–0; road: 0–1)

Game	Date	Team	Score	High points	High rebounds	High assists	Location Attendance	Record
65	May 1	Chicago	W 108–97	Trae Young (33)	Clint Capela (11)	Trae Young (7)	State Farm Arena; 3,053	35–30
66	May 3	Portland	W 123–114	Danilo Gallinari (28)	Clint Capela (10)	Trae Young (11)	State Farm Arena; 3,091	36–30
67	May 5	Phoenix	W 135–103	Clint Capela (18)	Clint Capela (10)	Trae Young (12)	State Farm Arena; 3,205	37–30
68	May 6	@ Indiana	L 126–133	Trae Young (30)	Clint Capela (9)	Trae Young (10)	Bankers Life Fieldhouse; 0	37–31
69	May 10	Washington	W 125–124	Trae Young (36)	Clint Capela (22)	Trae Young (9)	State Farm Arena; 3,054	38–31
70	May 12	Washington	W 120–116	Trae Young (33)	Clint Capela (11)	Trae Young (9)	State Farm Arena; 3,120	39–31
71	May 13	Orlando	W 116–93	Bogdan Bogdanović (27)	Clint Capela (14)	Trae Young (7)	State Farm Arena; 2,910	40–31
72	May 16	Houston	W 124–95	Onyeka Okongwu (21)	Onyeka Okongwu (15)	Trae Young (9)	State Farm Arena; 3,045	41–31

2020–21 season schedule

=== Playoffs ===
2021 playoff game log
Total: 10–8 (home: 4–4; road: 6–4)
First Round: 4–1 (home: 2–0; road: 2–1)

Game	Date	Team	Score	High points	High rebounds	High assists	Location Attendance	Series
1	May 23	@ New York	W 107–105 (OT)	Trae Young (32)	Clint Capela (13)	Trae Young (10)	Madison Square Garden; 15,047	1–0
2	May 26	@ New York	L 92–101	Trae Young (30)	Clint Capela (12)	Trae Young (7)	Madison Square Garden; 16,254	1–1
3	May 28	New York	W 105–94	Trae Young (21)	Clint Capela (12)	Trae Young (14)	State Farm Arena; 15,743	2–1
4	May 30	New York	W 113–96	Trae Young (27)	Clint Capela (15)	Trae Young (9)	State Farm Arena; 16,548	3–1
5	June 2	@ New York	W 103–89	Trae Young (36)	Clint Capela (15)	Trae Young (9)	Madison Square Garden; 16,512	4–1

Conference semifinals: 4–3 (home: 1–2; road: 3–1)

Game	Date	Team	Score	High points	High rebounds	High assists	Location Attendance	Series
1	June 6	@ Philadelphia	W 128–124	Trae Young (35)	Clint Capela (10)	Trae Young (10)	Wells Fargo Center; 18,624	1–0
2	June 8	@ Philadelphia	L 102–118	Gallinari, Young (21)	John Collins (10)	Trae Young (11)	Wells Fargo Center; 18,624	1–1
3	June 11	Philadelphia	L 111–127	Trae Young (28)	Clint Capela (16)	Trae Young (8)	State Farm Arena; 16,432	1–2
4	June 14	Philadelphia	W 103–100	Trae Young (25)	Clint Capela (13)	Trae Young (18)	State Farm Arena; 16,502	2–2
5	June 16	@ Philadelphia	W 109–106	Trae Young (39)	John Collins (11)	Trae Young (7)	Wells Fargo Center; 18,624	3–2
6	June 18	Philadelphia	L 99–104	Trae Young (34)	Capela, Huerter (11)	Trae Young (12)	State Farm Arena; 16,610	3–3
7	June 20	@ Philadelphia	W 103–96	Kevin Huerter (27)	John Collins (16)	Trae Young (10)	Wells Fargo Center; 18,624	4–3

Conference finals: 2–4 (home: 1–2; road: 1–2)

Game	Date	Team	Score	High points	High rebounds	High assists	Location Attendance	Series
1	June 23	@ Milwaukee	W 116–113	Trae Young (48)	Clint Capela (19)	Trae Young (11)	Fiserv Forum; 16,310	1–0
2	June 25	@ Milwaukee	L 91–125	Trae Young (15)	Capela, Collins (8)	Bogdan Bogdanović (4)	Fiserv Forum; 16,422	1–1
3	June 27	Milwaukee	L 102–113	Trae Young (35)	Clint Capela (11)	Kevin Huerter (7)	State Farm Arena; 16,650	1–2
4	June 29	Milwaukee	W 110–88	Lou Williams (21)	Capela, Collins (7)	Lou Williams (8)	State Farm Arena; 16,478	2–2
5	July 1	@ Milwaukee	L 112–123	Bogdan Bogdanović (28)	Capela, Collins (8)	Kevin Huerter (7)	Fiserv Forum; 16,389	2–3
6	July 3	Milwaukee	L 107–118	Cam Reddish (21)	John Collins (11)	Trae Young (9)	State Farm Arena; 16,620	2–4

2021 playoff schedule

== Player statistics ==
Legend
GP	Games played	GS	Games started	MPG	Minutes per game
FG%	Field-goal percentage	3P%	3-point field-goal percentage	FT%	Free-throw percentage
RPG	Rebounds per game	APG	Assists per game	SPG	Steals per game
BPG	Blocks per game	PPG	Points per game

=== Regular season ===
Player	GP	GS	MPG	FG%	3P%	FT%	RPG	APG	SPG	BPG	PPG
Solomon Hill	71	16	21.3	.359	.321	.761	3.0	1.1	.7	.2	4.5
Kevin Huerter	69	49	30.8	.432	.363	.781	3.3	3.5	1.2	.3	11.9
Trae Young	63	63	33.7	.438	.343	.886	3.9	9.4	.8	.2	25.3
Clint Capela	63	63	30.1	.594		.573	14.3	.8	.7	2.0	15.2
John Collins	63	63	29.3	.556	.399	.833	7.4	1.2	.5	1.0	17.6
Danilo Gallinari	51	4	24.0	.434	.406	.925	4.1	1.5	.6	.2	13.3
Onyeka Okongwu	50	4	12.0	.644	.000	.632	3.3	.4	.5	.7	4.6
Tony Snell	47	23	21.1	.515	.569	1.000	2.4	1.3	.3	.2	5.3
Brandon Goodwin	47	5	13.2	.377	.311	.651	1.5	2.0	.4	.0	4.9
Bogdan Bogdanović	44	27	29.7	.473	.438	.909	3.6	3.3	1.1	.3	16.4
Nathan Knight	33	0	8.5	.370	.182	.800	2.2	.2	.3	.3	3.8
Skylar Mays	33	0	8.2	.449	.350	.880	1.1	.9	.4	.1	3.8
Bruno Fernando	33	0	6.8	.409	.000	.682	2.4	.3	.1	.1	1.5
Rajon Rondo^{†}	27	2	14.9	.400	.378	.500	2.0	3.5	.7	.1	3.9
Cam Reddish	26	21	28.8	.365	.262	.817	4.0	1.3	1.3	.3	11.2
Lou Williams^{†}	24	1	21.0	.389	.444	.870	2.1	3.4	.3	.1	10.0
De'Andre Hunter	23	19	29.5	.484	.326	.859	4.8	1.9	.8	.5	15.0
Kris Dunn	4	0	11.3	.083	.000	.750	1.5	.5	.5	.5	1.3

=== Playoffs ===
Player	GP	GS	MPG	FG%	3P%	FT%	RPG	APG	SPG	BPG	PPG
Bogdan Bogdanović	18	18	33.2	.390	.329	.706	4.2	2.9	1.6	.3	14.1
John Collins	18	18	32.0	.549	.357	.833	8.7	.9	.4	.6	13.9
Clint Capela	18	18	31.6	.603		.436	11.2	.9	.7	1.1	10.1
Kevin Huerter	18	10	31.0	.428	.347	.706	3.8	2.8	.8	.9	11.1
Lou Williams	18	2	15.4	.455	.433	.963	1.4	2.2	.7	.1	7.7
Danilo Gallinari	18	0	24.6	.425	.405	.942	3.9	.8	.3	.2	12.8
Onyeka Okongwu	18	0	9.2	.548	.000	.667	2.7	.1	.3	.7	2.7
Trae Young	16	16	37.7	.418	.313	.866	2.8	9.5	1.3	.0	28.8
Solomon Hill	14	3	10.4	.250	.167	.500	1.4	.2	.1	.1	1.2
Tony Snell	9	0	7.3	.125	.091		.6	.2	.2	.1	.6
Skylar Mays	7	0	2.4	.800			.3	.1	.3	.0	1.1
Nathan Knight	6	0	2.3	.286	.000	.000	1.0	.0	.0	.3	.7
Bruno Fernando	6	0	2.0	.667		1.000	.2	.0	.0	.0	1.0
De'Andre Hunter	5	5	30.4	.400	.375	.750	4.0	.6	.2	.6	10.8
Kris Dunn	5	0	6.6	.200	.000	1.000	1.0	1.0	.4	.4	1.2
Cam Reddish	4	0	23.0	.528	.643	.800	3.5	1.8	1.5	.5	12.8

- ^{†} Denotes player spent time with another team in the season. Stats reflect time with the Hawks only.

== Transactions ==
=== Trades ===
November
November 19	To Atlanta Hawks: Khyri Thomas; Tony Snell	To Detroit Pistons: Dewayne Dedmon
November 24	To Atlanta Hawks: Danilo Gallinari (Sign and trade); Cash Considerations	To Oklahoma City Thunder: 2025 ATL protected second-round pick (Note: 2025 second round draft pick to Oklahoma City. Atlanta's 2025 2nd round pick to Oklahoma City protected for selections 31-55 (if this pick falls within its protected range and is therefore not conveyed, then Atlanta's obligation to Oklahoma City will be extinguished) [Atlanta-Oklahoma City, 11/24/2020])

March
March 25	To Atlanta Hawks: Lou Williams; Cash Considerations; Two future second-round draft picks	To Los Angeles Clippers: Rajon Rondo

=== Free agents ===
==== Additions ====
Player	Signed	Former Team
Nathan Knight	Two-Way Contract (November 19)	William & Mary Tribe
Danilo Gallinari	3 Year, $61.5M (November 20)	Oklahoma City Thunder
Kris Dunn	2 Year, $10M (November 21)	Chicago Bulls
Rajon Rondo	2 Year, $15M (November 21)	Los Angeles Lakers
Solomon Hill	1 Year, $2.1M (November 23)	Miami Heat
Bogdan Bogdanović	4 Year, $72M (November 24)	Sacramento Kings

==== Subtractions ====
Player	Reason left	New team
Vince Carter	Retired (June 25)	N/A
Khyri Thomas	Waived (November 20)	
DeAndre' Bembry	Free Agent	Toronto Raptors
Charlie Brown Jr.	Free Agent	
Treveon Graham	Free Agent	
Damian Jones	Free Agent	Phoenix Suns
Skal Labissière	Free Agent	
Jeff Teague	Free Agent	Boston Celtics
