= Udoka Azubuike =

Nigerian-American basketball player (born 1999)

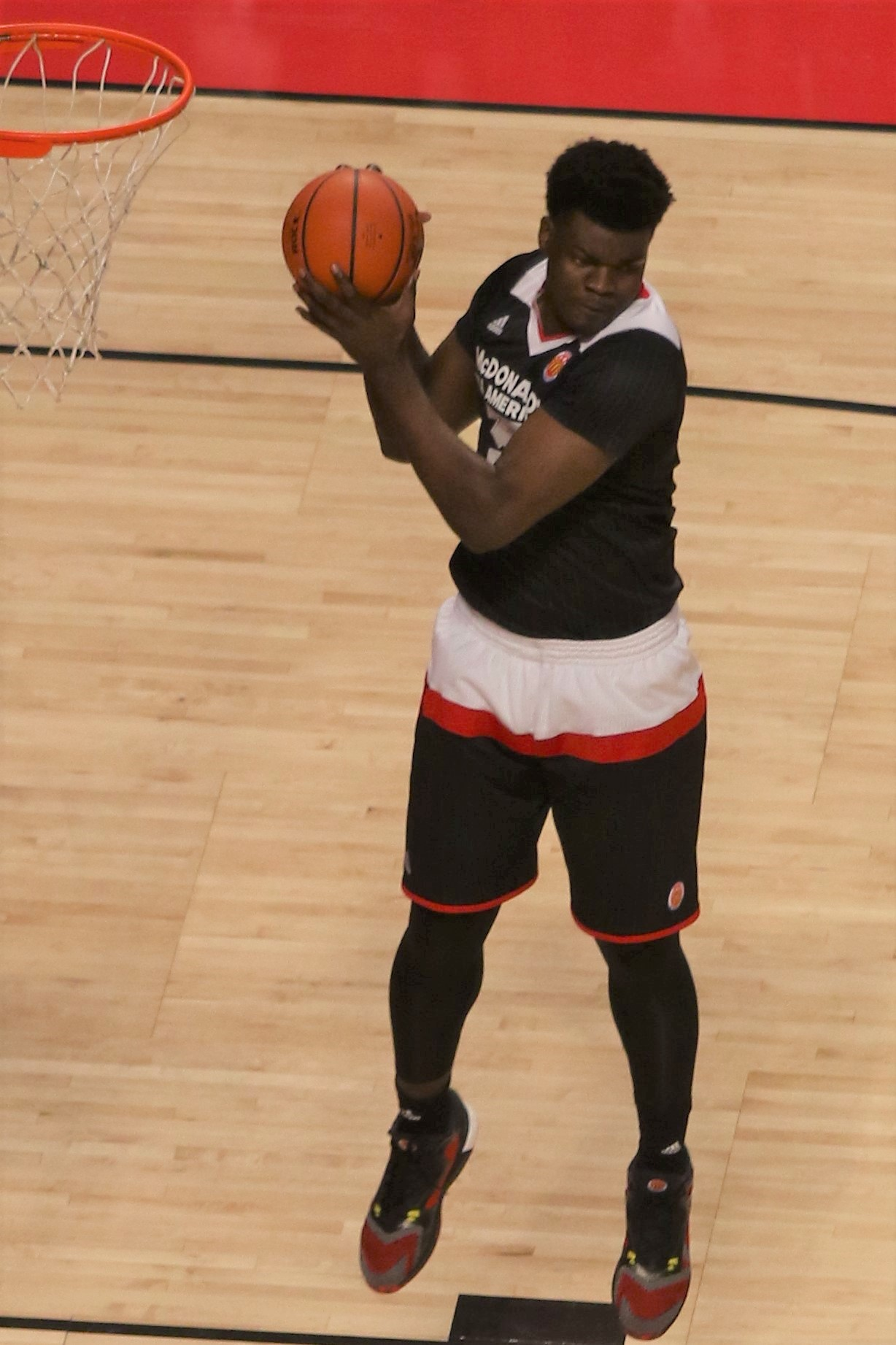
- Azubuike at the 2016 McDonald's All-American Game

No. 35 – Guangdong Southern Tigers
- Position: Center
- League: CBA

Personal information
- Born: September 17, 1999 (age 27) Lagos, Nigeria
- Listed height: 6 ft 11 in (2.11 m)
- Listed weight: 270 lb (122 kg)

Career information
- High school: Potter's House Christian Academy (Jacksonville, Florida)
- College: Kansas (2016–2020)
- NBA draft: 2020: 1st round, 27th overall pick
- Drafted by: Utah Jazz
- Playing career: 2020–present

Career history
- 2020–2023: Utah Jazz
- 2021–2022: →Salt Lake City Stars
- 2023–2024: Phoenix Suns
- 2024–2025: Budućnost
- 2025–2026: Ironi Ness Ziona
- 2026–present: Guangdong Southern Tigers

Career highlights
- Montenegrin Cup winner (2025); Consensus second-team All-American (2020); NABC Defensive Player of the Year (2020); Big 12 Player of the Year (2020); First-team All-Big 12 (2020); Third-team All-Big 12 (2018); McDonald's All-American (2016)
- Stats at NBA.com
- Stats at Basketball Reference

Udoka Timothy Azubuike (/juːˈdoʊkə ˌæzəˈbuːki/ yoo-DOH-kə AZ-ə-BOO-kee; born September 17, 1999) is a Nigerian-American professional basketball player for the Guangdong Southern Tigers of the Chinese Basketball Association (CBA). He played college basketball for the Kansas Jayhawks and was selected in the first round of the 2020 NBA draft by the Utah Jazz. Azubuike is a member of the Nigerian national team.

== Early life ==
Born in Lagos, Nigeria, Azubuike was the youngest of 5, with two older brothers and two older sisters. His father, Fabian, was a police officer, and his mother, Florence, was a middle school teacher. Azubuike lost his father to an undiagnosed disease at the age of 10. In 2012, he caught the attention of recruiters with Basketball Without Borders and was offered a scholarship to play basketball in the United States.

== High school career ==
Azubuike attended Potter's House Christian Academy in Jacksonville, Florida. His then assistant coach Harry Coxsome and his wife Donna took care of him and soon became his legal guardians. In his first high school game he was matched up against fellow future Kansas Jayhawk Joel Embiid. Azubuike was a four-year starter averaging 16.9 points and 9.7 rebounds per game his senior year.

Azubuike played Amateur Athletic Union (AAU) basketball for the Georgia Stars in the Nike Elite Youth Basketball League (EYBL). He was selected to play in the 2016 McDonald's All-American Boys Game, Jordan Brand Classic, and Nike Hoop Summit. He was also a member of the National Honor Society.

Azubuike was rated as a five-star recruit and considered a top-20 prospect in the 2016 high school class. Rivals.com ranked him as the 27th-best overall player while ESPN ranked him 22nd overall in the class of 2016. Azubuike received offers from many universities including Duke, Texas, Kentucky, and shortened his final list of colleges to Florida State, Kansas, and North Carolina. On January 28, 2016, he announced his choice to play college basketball at the University of Kansas.

== College career ==
=== Freshman year ===
In his freshman season he started in six of the 11 games he played in before tearing ligaments in his left wrist, which ended his season. Before the injury, he averaged 5.0 points, 4.4 rebounds, 1.6 blocks, and 62.9% field goal accuracy.

=== Sophomore year ===
For the 2017–18 season, Kansas' coach Bill Self recruited Kansas football player James Sosinski to defend Azubuike during practice. Udoka started every game of the regular season but missed the Big 12 Conference tournament after spraining his left MCL. He returned for the NCAA tournament until KU's loss to eventual champion Villanova in the Final Four. He averaged 13.0 points, 7.0 rebounds, 1.7 blocks, and led the nation with a 77% field goal percentage for the season. His field goal percentage broke the single-season record for Kansas and the Big 12 Conference. This high percentage was in part due to the majority of his field goals being slam dunks, which typically have a higher completion percentage than jump shots or layups. He had more dunks than any other college player going back to the 2009–2010 season. He was awarded All-Big 12 third team by the conference's coaches and second team by the AP.

On April 20, 2018, Azubuike announced his intention to enter the 2018 NBA draft. He did not initially hire an agent, which would allow him to return before the combine. Azubuike was one of a record-high 69 prospects invited to the NBA Draft Combine that year. On May 17, he measured out to be a near-7-foot-tall center (with shoes on) weighing in at 274 pounds (124 kg) and holding the second-longest wingspan at 7 feet 7 inches (2.31 m), behind only Mohamed Bamba. On May 30, 2018, he announced his intent to withdraw from the draft and return to Kansas for his junior season.

=== Junior year ===
Azubuike was selected as an honorable mention to the 2018–19 All-Big 12 preseason team. On December 4, 2018, he severely sprained his right ankle against Wofford and missed the following four games. On January 5, 2019, Azubuike injured his wrist during practice. An MRI revealed he tore a ligament in his right hand, and he underwent season-ending surgery on January 9, 2019.

Kansas won all nine games Azubuike played including against top-ten teams Tennessee and Michigan State. He finished the season averaging 13.4 points and 6.8 rebounds.

On April 22, 2019, Azubuike announced he would return to Kansas for his senior season. According to KU coach Bill Self, “We’re all very excited about Udoka making the decision not to enter the [NBA] draft. Unfortunately for him, injury is the reason as he still cannot participate (at) what would be the NBA combine or workouts for the NBA teams."

=== Senior year ===
Azubuike scored a career-high 29 points in a 90–84 overtime win over Dayton on November 27, 2019. On February 22, 2020, he scored 23 points and had a career-high 19 rebounds in a 64–61 win over top-ranked Baylor.

At the conclusion of the regular season, Azubuike was named the Big 12 Player of the Year and NABC Defensive Player of the Year. He averaged 13.7 points, 10.5 rebounds, and 2.6 blocks per game as a senior. Azubuike's career field goal percentage of 74.9% is an NCAA record.

== Professional career ==
=== Utah Jazz (2020–2023) ===
Azubuike was selected with the 27th pick in the first round of the 2020 NBA draft by the Utah Jazz. On November 24, 2020, the Jazz announced that they had signed Azubuike. Azubuike was assigned to the Jazz's NBA G League affiliate, the Salt Lake City Stars, for the start of the 2021 G League season, making his G League debut on February 10, 2021. He made his NBA playoff debut on June 14 in game 4 of the 2021 Western Conference Semifinals, recording a rebound in a minute and nine seconds of action in a 118–104 loss to the Los Angeles Clippers.

On March 25, 2022, Azubuike underwent right foot surgery and was ruled out for the rest of the 2021–22 season.

=== Phoenix Suns (2023–2024) ===
On August 8, 2023, Azubuike signed a two-way contract with the Phoenix Suns. He made his team debut on October 28 by putting up 2 points and 3 rebounds during 6 minutes of action in a 126–104 win over his former team, the Utah Jazz. On December 20, Azubuike recorded his first double-double with the Suns with 11 points and a season-high 11 rebounds in a 120–105 loss to the Sacramento Kings.

=== Budućnost VOLI (2024–2025) ===
On August 19, 2024, Azubuike signed with Budućnost VOLI of the Prva A Liga.

=== Ironi Ness Ziona (2025–2026) ===
In 2025, Azubuike joined Ironi Ness Ziona of the Israeli Ligat HaAl.

== National team career ==
Udoka was called up to play for the Nigerian national basketball team during the 2027 FIBA Basketball World Cup qualification games, during the August 27–30, 2026 qualifying window.

== Career statistics ==
Legend
GP	Games played	GS	Games started	MPG	Minutes per game
FG%	Field goal percentage	3P%	3-point field goal percentage	FT%	Free throw percentage
RPG	Rebounds per game	APG	Assists per game	SPG	Steals per game
BPG	Blocks per game	PPG	Points per game	**Bold**	Career high

=== NBA ===
==== Regular season ====
Year	Team	GP	GS	MPG	FG%	3P%	FT%	RPG	APG	SPG	BPG	PPG
2020–21	Utah	15	0	3.8	.444	—	**.800**	.9	.0	.1	.3	1.1
2021–22	Utah	17	**6**	**11.5**	.755	—	.545	**4.2**	.0	.1	**.6**	**4.7**
2022–23	Utah	**36**	4	10.0	**.819**	—	.350	3.3	**.3**	**.2**	.4	3.5
2023–24	Phoenix	16	0	7.1	.696	—	.231	2.0	.2	.1	.4	2.2
Career		84	10	8.6	.758	—	.444	2.8	.2	.1	.4	3.0

==== Playoffs ====
Year	Team	GP	GS	MPG	FG%	3P%	FT%	RPG	APG	SPG	BPG	PPG
2021	Utah	1	0	1.0	—	—	—	1.0	.0	.0	.0	.0
Career		1	0	1.0	—	—	—	1.0	.0	.0	.0	.0

=== College ===
*	Led NCAA Division I

Year	Team	GP	GS	MPG	FG%	3P%	FT%	RPG	APG	SPG	BPG	PPG
2016–17	Kansas	11	6	12.9	.629	–	.380	4.1	.2	.2	1.6	5.0
2017–18	Kansas	**36**	**34**	23.6	**.770***	–	.413	7.0	.7	**.6**	1.7	13.0
2018–19	Kansas	9	9	20.4	.705	–	.344	6.8	.6	.4	1.6	13.4
2019–20	Kansas	31	30	**27.7**	.748*	–	**.441**	**10.5**	**.9**	.5	**2.6**	**13.7**
Career		87	79	23.4	.746	–	.416	7.9	.7	.5	2.0	12.3
