= 2020–21 Utah Jazz season =

American professional basketball season

- Division champions
- Head coach: Quin Snyder
- General manager: Justin Zanik
- Owner: Ryan Smith
- Arena: Vivint Arena

Results
- Record: 52–20 (.722)
- Place: Division: 1st (Northwest); Conference: 1st (Western)
- Playoff finish: Conference semifinals (lost to Clippers 2–4)
- Stats at Basketball Reference

Local media
- Television: AT&T SportsNet Rocky Mountain
- Radio: 1280; 97.5 The Zone

The 2020–21 Utah Jazz season was the 47th season of the franchise in the National Basketball Association (NBA), and the 42nd season of the franchise in Salt Lake City.

The Utah Jazz clinched a playoff berth for the fifth straight year; they were the first team of the season to do so, following the Memphis Grizzlies' victory over the Portland Trail Blazers on April 25.

It was their first season finishing atop their conference since the 1997–98 season, and they had their highest win percentage since the 1998–99 season. Their 52–20 record approximately equals 59 wins in a full 82-game season. Additionally, despite the shortened season, it was their first season with 52 or more wins since the 2009–10 season.

In the first round, the Jazz defeated the Memphis Grizzlies in five games advancing to the conference semifinals where they faced the Los Angeles Clippers. The Jazz would lose in six games.

== Draft picks ==
Round	Pick	Player	Position	Nationality	College
1	27	Udoka Azubuike	C	Nigeria	Kansas
2	38	Saben Lee	PG	United States	Vanderbilt

== Roster ==
2020–21 Utah Jazz roster
Players

Pos.	No.	Player	Height	Weight	DOB	From
C	20	Udoka Azubuike	6 ft 11 in (2.11 m)	280 lb (127 kg)	1999-09-17	Kansas
F	44	Bojan Bogdanović	6 ft 8 in (2.03 m)	226 lb (103 kg)	1989-04-18	Croatia
F	5	Jarrell Brantley (TW)	6 ft 5 in (1.96 m)	250 lb (113 kg)	1996-06-07	College of Charleston
G	00	Jordan Clarkson	6 ft 4 in (1.93 m)	194 lb (88 kg)	1992-06-07	Missouri
G	10	Mike Conley	6 ft 1 in (1.85 m)	175 lb (79 kg)	1987-10-11	Ohio State
F/C	15	Derrick Favors	6 ft 9 in (2.06 m)	265 lb (120 kg)	1991-07-15	Georgia Tech
G	3	Trent Forrest (TW)	6 ft 4 in (1.93 m)	210 lb (95 kg)	1998-06-12	Florida State
C	27	Rudy Gobert	7 ft 1 in (2.16 m)	258 lb (117 kg)	1992-06-26	France
F	33	Elijah Hughes	6 ft 5 in (1.96 m)	215 lb (98 kg)	1998-03-10	Syracuse
F	77	Ersan Ilyasova	6 ft 9 in (2.06 m)	235 lb (107 kg)	1987-05-15	Turkey
G/F	2	Joe Ingles	6 ft 8 in (2.03 m)	220 lb (100 kg)	1987-10-02	Australia
G	45	Donovan Mitchell	6 ft 1 in (1.85 m)	215 lb (98 kg)	1996-09-07	Louisville
F	16	Juwan Morgan	6 ft 7 in (2.01 m)	232 lb (105 kg)	1997-04-17	Indiana
F	31	Georges Niang	6 ft 7 in (2.01 m)	230 lb (104 kg)	1993-06-17	Iowa State
F	23	Royce O'Neale	6 ft 4 in (1.93 m)	226 lb (103 kg)	1993-06-05	Baylor
G/F	81	Miye Oni	6 ft 5 in (1.96 m)	206 lb (93 kg)	1997-08-04	Yale
G	21	Matt Thomas	6 ft 4 in (1.93 m)	190 lb (86 kg)	1994-08-04	Iowa State

Coaches
Head coach
- Quin Snyder
Assistant(s)
- Bryan Bailey
- Dell Demps
- Alex Jensen
- Vince Legarza
- Sergi Oliva
- Lamar Skeeter

Legend
- (DP) Unsigned draft pick
- (FA) Free agent
- (S) Suspended
- (GL) On assignment to G League affiliate
- (TW) Two-way affiliate player
- Injured

Roster
Updated: March 25, 2021

== Standings ==
=== Division ===
Northwest Division	W	L	PCT	GB	Home	Road	Div	GP
z – Utah Jazz	52	20	.722	–	31‍–‍5	21‍–‍15	7–5	72
x – Denver Nuggets	47	25	.653	5.0	25‍–‍11	22‍–‍14	9–3	72
x – Portland Trail Blazers	42	30	.583	10.0	20‍–‍16	22‍–‍14	6–6	72
Minnesota Timberwolves	23	49	.319	29.0	13‍–‍23	10‍–‍26	5–7	72
Oklahoma City Thunder	22	50	.306	30.0	10‍–‍26	12‍–‍24	3–9	72

=== Conference ===
Western Conference
#	Team	W	L	PCT	GB	GP
1	z – Utah Jazz *	52	20	.722	–	72
2	y – Phoenix Suns *	51	21	.708	1.0	72
3	x – Denver Nuggets	47	25	.653	5.0	72
4	x – Los Angeles Clippers	47	25	.653	5.0	72
5	y – Dallas Mavericks *	42	30	.583	10.0	72
6	x – Portland Trail Blazers	42	30	.583	10.0	72
7	x – Los Angeles Lakers	42	30	.583	10.0	72
8	pi – Golden State Warriors	39	33	.542	13.0	72
9	x – Memphis Grizzlies	38	34	.528	14.0	72
10	pi – San Antonio Spurs	33	39	.458	19.0	72
11	New Orleans Pelicans	31	41	.431	21.0	72
12	Sacramento Kings	31	41	.431	21.0	72
13	Minnesota Timberwolves	23	49	.319	29.0	72
14	Oklahoma City Thunder	22	50	.306	30.0	72
15	Houston Rockets	17	55	.236	35.0	72

Notes

- z – Clinched home court advantage for the entire playoffs
- c – Clinched home court advantage for the conference playoffs
- y – Clinched division title
- x – Clinched playoff spot
- pi – Clinched play-in spot
- o – Eliminated from playoff contention
- * – Division leader

== Game log ==
=== Preseason ===
2020 preseason game log
Total: 3–0 (home: 2–0; road: 1–0)
Preseason: 3–0 (home: 2–0; road: 1–0)

Game	Date	Team	Score	High points	High rebounds	High assists	Location Attendance	Record
1	December 12	Phoenix	W 119–105	Jordan Clarkson (19)	Rudy Gobert (8)	Joe Ingles (7)	Vivint Arena; No In-Person Attendance	1–0
2	December 14	Phoenix	W 111–92	Bojan Bogdanović (18)	Rudy Gobert (20)	4 tied (3)	Vivint Arena; No In-Person Attendance	2–0
3	December 17	@ L. A. Clippers	W 125–105	Bogdanović, Clarkson (20)	Rudy Gobert (8)	Donovan Mitchell (8)	Staples Center; No In-Person Attendance	3–0

2020–21 preseason schedule

=== Regular season ===
2020–21 game log
Total: 52–20 (home: 31–5; road: 21–15)
December: 2–2 (home: 0–2; road: 2–0)

Game	Date	Team	Score	High points	High rebounds	High assists	Location Attendance	Record
1	December 23	@ Portland	W 120–100	Gobert, Mitchell (20)	Rudy Gobert (17)	Joe Ingles (7)	Moda Center; 0	1–0
2	December 26	Minnesota	L 111–116	Jordan Clarkson (23)	Rudy Gobert (17)	Donovan Mitchell (5)	Vivint Arena; 0	1–1
3	December 28	@ Oklahoma City	W 110–109	Bojan Bogdanović (23)	Conley Jr., Gobert (10)	Mike Conley Jr. (9)	Chesapeake Energy Arena; 0	2–1
4	December 31	Phoenix	L 95–106	Donovan Mitchell (23)	Rudy Gobert (14)	Conley Jr., Ingles (4)	Vivint Arena; 1,932	2–2

January: 13–3 (home: 8–0; road: 5–3)

Game	Date	Team	Score	High points	High rebounds	High assists	Location Attendance	Record
5	January 1	L. A. Clippers	W 106–100	Mike Conley Jr. (33)	Derrick Favors (11)	Conley Jr., Ingles (7)	Vivint Arena; 1,932	3–2
6	January 3	@ San Antonio	W 130–109	Bojan Bogdanović (28)	Rudy Gobert (16)	Donovan Mitchell (5)	AT&T Center; 0	4–2
7	January 5	@ Brooklyn	L 96–130	Donovan Mitchell (31)	Rudy Gobert (11)	Mike Conley Jr. (5)	Barclays Center; 0	4–3
8	January 6	@ New York	L 100–112	Jordan Clarkson (19)	Rudy Gobert (11)	Mike Conley Jr. (6)	Madison Square Garden; 0	4–4
9	January 8	@ Milwaukee	W 131–118	Donovan Mitchell (32)	Rudy Gobert (14)	Mike Conley Jr. (10)	Fiserv Forum; 0	5–4
10	January 10	@ Detroit	W 96–86	Donovan Mitchell (28)	Rudy Gobert (19)	Mike Conley Jr. (6)	Little Caesars Arena; 0	6–4
11	January 12	@ Cleveland	W 117–87	Donovan Mitchell (27)	Rudy Gobert (10)	Mike Conley Jr. (5)	Rocket Mortgage FieldHouse; 1,944	7–4
–	January 13	@ Washington	Postponed (COVID-19) (Makeup date: March 18)					
12	January 15	Atlanta	W 116–92	Donovan Mitchell (26)	Rudy Gobert (13)	Mike Conley Jr. (8)	Vivint Arena; 1,932	8–4
13	January 17	@ Denver	W 109–105	Jordan Clarkson (23)	Rudy Gobert (13)	Mike Conley Jr. (8)	Ball Arena; 0	9–4
14	January 19	New Orleans	W 118–102	Donovan Mitchell (28)	Rudy Gobert (18)	Mike Conley Jr. (10)	Vivint Arena; 1,932	10–4
15	January 21	New Orleans	W 129–118	Donovan Mitchell (36)	Rudy Gobert (11)	Joe Ingles (9)	Vivint Arena; 1,932	11–4
16	January 23	Golden State	W 127–108	Donovan Mitchell (23)	Rudy Gobert (14)	Bojan Bogdanović (8)	Vivint Arena; 1,932	12–4
17	January 26	New York	W 108–94	Royce O'Neale (20)	Rudy Gobert (19)	Joe Ingles (6)	Vivint Arena; 1,932	13–4
18	January 27	Dallas	W 116–104	Rudy Gobert (29)	Rudy Gobert (20)	Joe Ingles (8)	Vivint Arena; 1,932	14–4
19	January 29	Dallas	W 120–101	Bojan Bogdanović (32)	Rudy Gobert (12)	Mike Conley Jr. (9)	Vivint Arena; 1,932	15–4
20	January 31	@ Denver	L 117–128	Bojan Bogdanović (29)	Rudy Gobert (8)	Mike Conley Jr. (8)	Ball Arena; 0	15–5

February: 12–2 (home: 7–0; road: 5–2)

Game	Date	Team	Score	High points	High rebounds	High assists	Location Attendance	Record
21	February 2	Detroit	W 117–105	Donovan Mitchell (32)	Royce O'Neale (13)	Joe Ingles (6)	Vivint Arena; 3,902	16–5
22	February 4	@ Atlanta	W 112–91	Jordan Clarkson (23)	Rudy Gobert (12)	Donovan Mitchell (5)	State Farm Arena; 1,261	17–5
23	February 5	@ Charlotte	W 138–121	Bojan Bogdanović (31)	Rudy Gobert (15)	Joe Ingles (11)	Spectrum Center; 0	18–5
24	February 7	@ Indiana	W 103–95	Donovan Mitchell (27)	Rudy Gobert (16)	Donovan Mitchell (11)	Bankers Life Fieldhouse; 0	19–5
25	February 9	Boston	W 122–108	Donovan Mitchell (36)	Rudy Gobert (12)	Donovan Mitchell (9)	Vivint Arena; 3,902	20–5
26	February 12	Milwaukee	W 129–115	Gobert, Ingles (27)	Rudy Gobert (12)	Donovan Mitchell (8)	Vivint Arena; 3,902	21–5
27	February 13	Miami	W 112–94	Donovan Mitchell (26)	Rudy Gobert (12)	Joe Ingles (6)	Vivint Arena; 3,902	22–5
28	February 15	Philadelphia	W 134–123	Jordan Clarkson (40)	Rudy Gobert (9)	Mitchell, Ingles (5)	Vivint Arena; 3,902	23–5
29	February 17	@ L. A. Clippers	W 114–96	Donovan Mitchell (24)	Rudy Gobert (20)	Donovan Mitchell (7)	Staples Center; 0	24–5
30	February 19	@ L. A. Clippers	L 112–116	Donovan Mitchell (35)	Rudy Gobert (15)	Donovan Mitchell (5)	Staples Center; 0	24–6
31	February 22	Charlotte	W 132–110	Donovan Mitchell (23)	Rudy Gobert (12)	Donovan Mitchell (8)	Vivint Arena; 3,902	25–6
32	February 24	L. A. Lakers	W 114–89	Gobert, Clarkson (18)	Donovan Mitchell (10)	Mitchell, Conley Jr. (8)	Vivint Arena; 3,902	26–6
33	February 26	@ Miami	L 116–124	Donovan Mitchell (30)	Rudy Gobert (12)	Mike Conley Jr. (7)	American Airlines Arena; Limited seating	26–7
34	February 27	@ Orlando	W 124–109	Donovan Mitchell (31)	Rudy Gobert (16)	Joe Ingles (7)	Amway Center; 4,242	27–7

March: 9–4 (home: 5–0; road: 4–4)

Game	Date	Team	Score	High points	High rebounds	High assists	Location Attendance	Record
35	March 1	@ New Orleans	L 124–129	Bojan Bogdanović (30)	Rudy Gobert (9)	Mitchell, Conley Jr. (8)	Smoothie King Center; 2,700	27–8
36	March 3	@ Philadelphia	L 123–131	Donovan Mitchell (33)	Royce O'Neale (10)	Donovan Mitchell (6)	Wells Fargo Center; 0	27–9
37	March 12	Houston	W 114–99	Donovan Mitchell (28)	Rudy Gobert (11)	Donovan Mitchell (8)	Vivint Arena; 5,546	28–9
38	March 14	@ Golden State	L 119–131	Gobert, Mitchell (24)	Rudy Gobert (28)	Joe Ingles (7)	Chase Center; 0	28–10
39	March 16	@ Boston	W 117–109	Donovan Mitchell (21)	Rudy Gobert (12)	Mitchell, Conley Jr. (5)	TD Garden; 0	29–10
40	March 18	@ Washington	L 122–131	Donovan Mitchell (42)	Rudy Gobert (13)	Clarkson, Mitchell (6)	Capital One Arena; 0	29–11
41	March 19	@ Toronto	W 115–112	Donovan Mitchell (31)	Rudy Gobert (16)	Ingles, Mitchell (6)	Amalie Arena; Limited seating	30–11
42	March 22	@ Chicago	W 120–95	Donovan Mitchell (30)	Rudy Gobert (10)	Donovan Mitchell (6)	United Center; 0	31–11
43	March 24	Brooklyn	W 118–88	Donovan Mitchell (27)	Rudy Gobert (11)	Donovan Mitchell (7)	Vivint Arena; 5,546	32–11
44	March 26	Memphis	W 117–114	Donovan Mitchell (35)	Royce O'Neale (10)	Mike Conley Jr. (8)	Vivint Arena; 5,546	33–11
45	March 27	Memphis	W 126–110	Donovan Mitchell (35)	Rudy Gobert (14)	Mitchell, Ingles (7)	Vivint Arena; 5,546	34–11
46	March 29	Cleveland	W 114–75	Donovan Mitchell (19)	Rudy Gobert (17)	Bogdanovic, Conley Jr. (5)	Vivint Arena; 5,546	35–11
47	March 31	@ Memphis	W 111–107	Mike Conley Jr. (26)	Rudy Gobert (12)	Mike Conley Jr. (7)	FedExForum; 2,314	36–11

April: 9–7 (home: 6–2; road: 3–5)

Game	Date	Team	Score	High points	High rebounds	High assists	Location Attendance	Record
48	April 2	Chicago	W 113–106	Donovan Mitchell (26)	Rudy Gobert (13)	Mitchell, Conley Jr. (5)	Vivint Arena; 5,546	37–11
49	April 3	Orlando	W 137–91	Donovan Mitchell (22)	Favors, Gobert, Ingles (6)	Jordan Clarkson (9)	Vivint Arena; 5,546	38–11
50	April 5	@ Dallas	L 103–111	Mike Conley Jr. (28)	Rudy Gobert (15)	Mike Conley Jr. (7)	American Airlines Center; 4,261	38–12
51	April 7	@ Phoenix	L 113–117	Donovan Mitchell (41)	Rudy Gobert (15)	Mike Conley Jr. (10)	Phoenix Suns Arena; 5,110	38–13
52	April 8	Portland	W 122–103	Donovan Mitchell (37)	Rudy Gobert (20)	Joe Ingles (6)	Vivint Arena; 5,546	39–13
53	April 10	Sacramento	W 128–112	Donovan Mitchell (42)	Royce O'Neale (14)	Joe Ingles (6)	Vivint Arena; 5,546	40–13
54	April 12	Washington	L 121–125	Donovan Mitchell (42)	O'Neale, Gobert (12)	Ingles, Mitchell (6)	Vivint Arena; 5,546	40–14
55	April 13	Oklahoma City	W 106–96	Bojan Bogdanović (23)	Rudy Gobert (14)	Mike Conley Jr. (14)	Vivint Arena; 5,546	41–14
56	April 16	Indiana	W 119–111	Bojan Bogdanović (24)	Rudy Gobert (23)	Mike Conley Jr. (10)	Vivint Arena; 5,546	42–14
57	April 17	@ L. A. Lakers	L 115–127 (OT)	Jordan Clarkson (27)	Royce O'Neale (8)	Joe Ingles (14)	Staples Center; 1,710	42–15
58	April 19	@ L. A. Lakers	W 111–97	Jordan Clarkson (22)	Rudy Gobert (10)	Mike Conley Jr. (10)	Staples Center; 1,710	43–15
59	April 21	@ Houston	W 112–89	Jordan Clarkson (22)	Rudy Gobert (18)	Mike Conley Jr. (13)	Toyota Center; 3,253	44–15
60	April 24	Minnesota	L 96–101	Bojan Bogdanović (30)	Rudy Gobert (17)	Ingles, Conley Jr. (7)	Vivint Arena; 5,546	44–16
61	April 26	@ Minnesota	L 104–105	Mike Conley Jr. (26)	Royce O'Neale (10)	Derrick Favors (8)	Target Center; 1,638	44–17
62	April 28	@ Sacramento	W 154–105	Bojan Bogdanović (24)	Derrick Favors (11)	Joe Ingles (7)	Golden 1 Center; 0	45–17
63	April 30	@ Phoenix	L 100–121	Bojan Bogdanović (22)	Rudy Gobert (10)	Clarkson, Ingles (4)	Phoenix Suns Arena; 6,065	45–18

May: 7–2 (home: 5–1; road: 2–1)

Game	Date	Team	Score	High points	High rebounds	High assists	Location Attendance	Record
64	May 1	Toronto	W 106–102	Bojan Bogdanović (34)	Rudy Gobert (16)	Joe Ingles (9)	Vivint Arena; 6,506	46–18
65	May 3	San Antonio	W 110–99	Bojan Bogdanović (25)	Rudy Gobert (15)	Joe Ingles (9)	Vivint Arena; 6,506	47–18
66	May 5	San Antonio	W 126–94	Jordan Clarkson (30)	Rudy Gobert (8)	Joe Ingles (7)	Vivint Arena; 6,506	48–18
67	May 7	Denver	W 127–120	Bojan Bogdanović (48)	Rudy Gobert (9)	Joe Ingles (9)	Vivint Arena; 6,506	49–18
68	May 8	Houston	W 124–116	Georges Niang (24)	Rudy Gobert (14)	Joe Ingles (7)	Vivint Arena; 6,506	50–18
69	May 10	@ Golden State	L 116–119	Jordan Clarkson (41)	Rudy Gobert (15)	Joe Ingles (5)	Chase Center; 4,155	50–19
70	May 12	Portland	L 98–105	Jordan Clarkson (29)	Rudy Gobert (20)	Joe Ingles (4)	Vivint Arena; 6,506	50–20
71	May 14	@ Oklahoma City	W 109–93	Bojan Bogdanovic (22)	Rudy Gobert (18)	Joe Ingles (5)	Chesapeake Energy Arena; 0	51–20
72	May 16	@ Sacramento	W 121–99	Jordan Clarkson (33)	Rudy Gobert (16)	Mike Conley Jr. (9)	Golden 1 Center; 0	52–20

2020–21 season schedule

=== Playoffs ===
2021 playoff game log
Total: 6–5 (home: 4–2; road: 2–3)
First round: 4–1 (home: 2–1; road: 2–0)

Game	Date	Team	Score	High points	High rebounds	High assists	Location Attendance	Series
1	May 23	Memphis	L 109–112	Bojan Bogdanović (29)	Rudy Gobert (15)	Mike Conley Jr. (11)	Vivint Arena; 13,750	0–1
2	May 26	Memphis	W 141–129	Donovan Mitchell (25)	Rudy Gobert (13)	Mike Conley Jr. (15)	Vivint Arena; 14,200	1–1
3	May 29	@ Memphis	W 121–111	Donovan Mitchell (29)	Rudy Gobert (14)	Mike Conley Jr. (8)	FedExForum; 12,185	2–1
4	May 31	@ Memphis	W 120–113	Donovan Mitchell (30)	Royce O'Neale (9)	Donovan Mitchell (8)	FedExForum; 12,185	3–1
5	June 2	Memphis	W 126–110	Donovan Mitchell (30)	Rudy Gobert (15)	Donovan Mitchell (10)	Vivint Arena; 14,250	4–1

Conference semifinals: 2–4 (home: 2–1; road: 0–3)

Game	Date	Team	Score	High points	High rebounds	High assists	Location Attendance	Series
1	June 8	L. A. Clippers	W 112–109	Donovan Mitchell (45)	Rudy Gobert (12)	Joe Ingles (7)	Vivint Arena; 18,007	1–0
2	June 10	L. A. Clippers	W 117–111	Donovan Mitchell (37)	Rudy Gobert (20)	Ingles, Mitchell (4)	Vivint Arena; 18,007	2–0
3	June 12	@ L. A. Clippers	L 106–132	Donovan Mitchell (30)	Rudy Gobert (10)	Donovan Mitchell (4)	Staples Center; 8,185	2–1
4	June 14	@ L. A. Clippers	L 104–118	Donovan Mitchell (37)	Gobert, O'Neale (8)	Bogdanović, Mitchell (5)	Staples Center; 8,474	2–2
5	June 16	L. A. Clippers	L 111–119	Bojan Bogdanović (32)	Rudy Gobert (10)	Joe Ingles (6)	Vivint Arena; 18,007	2–3
6	June 18	@ L. A. Clippers	L 119–131	Donovan Mitchell (39)	Gobert, O'Neale (10)	Donovan Mitchell (9)	Staples Center; 17,105	2–4

2021 playoff schedule

== Player statistics ==
Legend
GP	Games played	GS	Games started	MPG	Minutes per game
FG%	Field-goal percentage	3P%	3-point field-goal percentage	FT%	Free-throw percentage
RPG	Rebounds per game	APG	Assists per game	SPG	Steals per game
BPG	Blocks per game	PPG	Points per game

=== Regular season ===
Player	GP	GS	MPG	FG%	3P%	FT%	RPG	APG	SPG	BPG	PPG
Bojan Bogdanović	72	72	30.8	.439	.390	.879	3.9	1.9	.6	.1	17.0
Georges Niang	72	10	16.0	.437	.425	.957	2.4	.8	.3	.1	6.9
Royce O'Neale	71	71	31.6	.444	.385	.848	6.8	2.5	.8	.5	7.0
Rudy Gobert	71	71	30.8	.675	.000	.623	13.5	1.3	.6	2.7	14.3
Jordan Clarkson	68	1	26.7	.425	.347	.896	4.0	2.5	.9	.1	18.4
Derrick Favors	68	0	15.3	.638	.000	.738	5.5	.6	.5	1.0	5.4
Joe Ingles	67	30	27.9	.489	.451	.844	3.6	4.7	.7	.2	12.1
Miye Oni	54	0	9.6	.354	.341	.833	1.6	.5	.2	.1	1.9
Donovan Mitchell	53	53	33.4	.438	.386	.845	4.4	5.2	1.0	.3	26.4
Mike Conley Jr.	51	51	29.4	.444	.412	.852	3.5	6.0	1.4	.2	16.2
Trent Forrest	30	0	10.1	.451	.192	1.000	1.5	1.5	.3	.1	2.9
Juwan Morgan	29	0	5.1	.467	.308	.429	1.0	.3	.1	.0	1.2
Jarrell Brantley	28	0	4.9	.481	.429	1.000	1.0	.5	.3	.1	2.3
Matt Thomas^{†}	19	0	7.1	.400	.256	.857	1.2	.5	.1	.0	3.6
Elijah Hughes	18	0	3.6	.333	.348	.750	.5	.3	.1	.1	1.7
Ersan İlyasova	17	1	8.7	.389	.439	1.000	1.7	.2	.6	.2	3.8
Shaquille Harrison^{†}	17	0	3.3	.300	.000	.833	.5	.5	.1	.0	1.0
Udoka Azubuike	15	0	3.8	.444		.800	.9	.0	.1	.3	1.1

=== Playoffs ===
Player	GP	GS	MPG	FG%	3P%	FT%	RPG	APG	SPG	BPG	PPG
Royce O'Neale	11	11	36.7	.506	.467	.833	7.3	2.1	1.1	.3	11.3
Bojan Bogdanović	11	11	35.5	.467	.461	.878	4.3	1.5	.9	.0	18.1
Rudy Gobert	11	11	34.2	.741	.000	.636	12.3	.8	.5	2.1	14.7
Joe Ingles	11	6	27.8	.494	.414	.769	3.1	3.5	.6	.0	10.2
Jordan Clarkson	11	0	27.1	.406	.351	.962	3.1	1.5	.6	.3	17.5
Derrick Favors	11	0	13.2	.696		.556	4.2	.3	.2	.9	3.4
Georges Niang	11	0	11.7	.282	.300	1.000	1.7	.7	.0	.1	3.2
Donovan Mitchell	10	10	34.6	.447	.435	.829	4.2	5.5	1.1	.2	32.3
Miye Oni	8	0	5.1	.000	.000		.4	.0	.1	.0	.0
Mike Conley Jr.	6	6	29.3	.426	.486	1.000	3.5	7.7	.2	.5	15.3
Trent Forrest	4	0	2.5	.500			.0	.0	.0	.0	1.0
Matt Thomas	3	0	2.3	.000			.3	.0	.0	.0	.0
Juwan Morgan	2	0	3.0				1.0	.5	.0	.0	.0
Jarrell Brantley	2	0	1.5	.000		.500	.5	.0	.0	.0	.5
Ersan İlyasova	1	0	3.0	.500	.000	1.000	.0	.0	.0	.0	4.0
Udoka Azubuike	1	0	1.0				1.0	.0	.0	.0	.0

- ^{†} Denotes player spent time with another team in the season. Stats reflect time with the Jazz only.

== Transactions ==
=== Trades ===
November 18, 2020	To Utah Jazz 2020 LAC first-round pick (#27); 2020 CHA second-round pick (#38)	To New York Knicks 2020 UTA first-round pick (#23); Draft rights to Ante Tomić (2008 #44)
November 19, 2020	To Utah Jazz Draft rights to Elijah Hughes (#39)	To New Orleans Pelicans 2022 UTA second-round pick cash considerations
November 22, 2020	To Utah Jazz cash considerations	To Detroit Pistons Tony Bradley; Draft rights to Saben Lee (#38)
November 23, 2020	To Utah Jazz cash considerations	To New York Knicks Ed Davis; 2023 UTA second-round pick 2024 second-round pick
November 27, 2020	To Utah Jazz cash considerations	To Cleveland Cavaliers Rayjon Tucker; 2027 UTA second-round pick
March 25, 2021	To Utah Jazz Matt Thomas	To Toronto Raptors 2021 UTA second-round pick (from GSW)

=== Free agency ===
==== Re-signed ====
Player	Signed
Jordan Clarkson	November 23, 2020
Jarrell Brantley	Two-way contract

==== Additions ====
Player	Signed	Former team
Derrick Favors	November 25, 2020	New Orleans Pelicans
Trent Forrest	Two-way contract	Florida State

== Awards ==
Recipient	Award	Date awarded	Ref.
Quin Snyder	Western Conference Coach of the Month (December/January)	February 1, 2021	
