= 2020–21 Dallas Mavericks season =

NBA professional basketball team season

- Division champions
- Head coach: Rick Carlisle
- President: Donnie Nelson
- General manager: Donnie Nelson
- Owner: Mark Cuban
- Arena: American Airlines Center

Results
- Record: 42–30 (.583)
- Place: Division: 1st (Southwest); Conference: 5th (Western)
- Playoff finish: First round (lost to Clippers 3–4)
- Stats at Basketball Reference

Local media
- Television: Bally Sports Southwest; KTXA
- Radio: KESN

The 2020–21 Dallas Mavericks season was the 41st season of the franchise in the National Basketball Association (NBA). The Mavericks clinched the Southwest division for the first time since the 2009-10 season following a 110–90 victory over the Cleveland Cavaliers on May 7, 2021. However, the Mavericks lost in the first round to the Los Angeles Clippers for the second consecutive season in seven games.

Following the season on June 17, 2021, long time head coach Rick Carlisle resigned from his position as head coach after 13 seasons and leading the team to a championship in 2011.

== Draft ==
Round	Pick	Player	Position	Nationality	School
1	18	Josh Green	SG	Australia	Arizona
2	31^{1}	Tyrell Terry	PG	United States	Stanford

^{1} The Mavericks acquired the second-round pick from the Golden State Warriors.

== Roster ==
2020–21 Dallas Mavericks roster
Players

Pos.	No.	Player	Height	Weight	DOB	From
F	2	Tyler Bey (TW)	6 ft 7 in (2.01 m)	215 lb (98 kg)	1998-02-10	Colorado
G	13	Jalen Brunson	6 ft 1 in (1.85 m)	190 lb (86 kg)	1996-08-31	Villanova
G	3	Trey Burke	6 ft 0 in (1.83 m)	185 lb (84 kg)	1992-11-12	Michigan
C	33	Willie Cauley-Stein	7 ft 0 in (2.13 m)	240 lb (109 kg)	1993-08-18	Kentucky
G/F	77	Luka Dončić	6 ft 7 in (2.01 m)	230 lb (104 kg)	1999-02-28	Slovenia
F	10	Dorian Finney-Smith	6 ft 7 in (2.01 m)	220 lb (100 kg)	1993-05-04	Florida
G	8	Josh Green	6 ft 5 in (1.96 m)	200 lb (91 kg)	2000-11-16	Arizona
G/F	11	Tim Hardaway	6 ft 5 in (1.96 m)	205 lb (93 kg)	1992-03-16	Michigan
G/F	14	Nate Hinton (TW)	6 ft 5 in (1.96 m)	210 lb (95 kg)	1999-06-08	Houston
F	42	Maxi Kleber	6 ft 10 in (2.08 m)	240 lb (109 kg)	1992-01-29	Germany
C	51	Boban Marjanović	7 ft 4 in (2.24 m)	290 lb (132 kg)	1988-08-15	Serbia
F	44	Nicolò Melli	6 ft 9 in (2.06 m)	236 lb (107 kg)	1991-01-26	Italy
F/C	6	Kristaps Porziņģis	7 ft 3 in (2.21 m)	240 lb (109 kg)	1995-08-02	Latvia
F/C	7	Dwight Powell	6 ft 10 in (2.08 m)	240 lb (109 kg)	1991-07-20	Stanford
G	17	JJ Redick	6 ft 3 in (1.91 m)	200 lb (91 kg)	1984-06-24	Duke
G	0	Josh Richardson	6 ft 5 in (1.96 m)	200 lb (91 kg)	1993-09-15	Tennessee
G	1	Tyrell Terry	6 ft 2 in (1.88 m)	160 lb (73 kg)	2000-09-28	Stanford

Coaches
Head coach
- Rick Carlisle
Assistant(s)
- Darrell Armstrong
- Jenny Boucek
- Zach Guthrie
- Jamahl Mosley
- Mike Weinar

Legend
- (DP) Unsigned draft pick
- (FA) Free agent
- (S) Suspended
- (GL) On assignment to G League affiliate
- (TW) Two-way affiliate player
- Injured

Roster
Updated: March 26, 2021

== Standings ==
=== Division ===
Southwest Division	W	L	PCT	GB	Home	Road	Div	GP
y – Dallas Mavericks	42	30	.583	–	21‍–‍15	21‍–‍15	7–5	72
x – Memphis Grizzlies	38	34	.528	4.0	18‍–‍18	20‍–‍16	6–6	72
pi – San Antonio Spurs	33	39	.458	9.0	14‍–‍22	19‍–‍17	6–6	72
New Orleans Pelicans	31	41	.431	11.0	18‍–‍18	13‍–‍23	6–6	72
Houston Rockets	17	55	.236	25.0	9‍–‍27	8‍–‍28	5–7	72

=== Conference ===
Western Conference
#	Team	W	L	PCT	GB	GP
1	z – Utah Jazz *	52	20	.722	–	72
2	y – Phoenix Suns *	51	21	.708	1.0	72
3	x – Denver Nuggets	47	25	.653	5.0	72
4	x – Los Angeles Clippers	47	25	.653	5.0	72
5	y – Dallas Mavericks *	42	30	.583	10.0	72
6	x – Portland Trail Blazers	42	30	.583	10.0	72
7	x – Los Angeles Lakers	42	30	.583	10.0	72
8	pi – Golden State Warriors	39	33	.542	13.0	72
9	x – Memphis Grizzlies	38	34	.528	14.0	72
10	pi – San Antonio Spurs	33	39	.458	19.0	72
11	New Orleans Pelicans	31	41	.431	21.0	72
12	Sacramento Kings	31	41	.431	21.0	72
13	Minnesota Timberwolves	23	49	.319	29.0	72
14	Oklahoma City Thunder	22	50	.306	30.0	72
15	Houston Rockets	17	55	.236	35.0	72

Notes

- z – Clinched home court advantage for the entire playoffs
- c – Clinched home court advantage for the conference playoffs
- y – Clinched division title
- x – Clinched playoff spot
- pb – Clinched play-in spot
- o – Eliminated from playoff contention
- * – Division leader

== Game log ==
=== Preseason ===
The preseason schedule was announced on November 27, 2020.

2020 preseason game log
Total: 2–1 (home: 0–1; road: 2–0)
Preseason: 2–1 (home: 0–1; road: 2–0)

Game	Date	Team	Score	High points	High rebounds	High assists	Location Attendance	Record
1	December 12	@ Milwaukee	W 112–102	Dončić, Kleber (13)	Nate Hinton (8)	three players (4)	Fiserv Forum; 0	1–0
2	December 14	@ Milwaukee	W 128–112	Luka Dončić (27)	Dorian Finney-Smith (11)	Burke, Dončić (4)	Fiserv Forum; 0	2–0
3	December 17	Minnesota	L 127–129	Luka Dončić (20)	Hardaway Jr., Powell (6)	Luka Dončić (7)	American Airlines Center; 0	2–1

2020–21 season schedule

=== Regular season ===
The schedule for the first half was announced on December 4, 2020. The second half was revealed on February 24, 2021.

2020–21 game log
Total: 42–30 (home: 21–15; road: 21–15)
December: 1–3 (home: 0–1; road: 1–2)

Game	Date	Team	Score	High points	High rebounds	High assists	Location Attendance	Record
1	December 23	@ Phoenix	L 102–106	Luka Dončić (32)	Dončić, Finney-Smith (8)	Luka Dončić (5)	Mortgage Matchup Center; 0	0–1
2	December 25	@ L. A. Lakers	L 115–138	Luka Dončić (27)	Maxi Kleber (5)	Luka Dončić (7)	Staples Center; 0	0–2
3	December 27	@ L. A. Clippers	W 124–73	Luka Dončić (24)	Luka Dončić (9)	Luka Dončić (8)	Staples Center; 0	1–2
4	December 30	Charlotte	L 99–118	Tim Hardaway Jr. (18)	three players (6)	Luka Dončić (5)	American Airlines Center; 0	1–3

January: 7–9 (home: 2–4; road: 5–5)

Game	Date	Team	Score	High points	High rebounds	High assists	Location Attendance	Record
5	January 1	Miami	W 93–83	Luka Dončić (27)	Luka Dončić (15)	Luka Dončić (7)	American Airlines Center; 0	2–3
6	January 3	@ Chicago	L 108–118	Jalen Brunson (31)	Finney-Smith, Marjanović (6)	Jalen Brunson (7)	United Center; 0	2–4
7	January 4	@ Houston	W 113–100	Luka Dončić (33)	Luka Dončić (16)	Luka Dončić (11)	Toyota Center; 0	3–4
8	January 7	@ Denver	W 124–117	Luka Dončić (38)	Cauley-Stein, Dončić (9)	Luka Dončić (13)	Ball Arena; 0	4–4
9	January 9	Orlando	W 112–98	Tim Hardaway Jr. (36)	Luka Dončić (11)	Luka Dončić (10)	American Airlines Center; 0	5–4
–	January 11	New Orleans	Postponed (COVID-19) (Makeup date: May 12) (Note: The game originally scheduled for January 11, was postponed due to the COVID-19 protocol.)					
10	January 13	@ Charlotte	W 104–93	Luka Dončić (34)	Willie Cauley-Stein (14)	Luka Dončić (9)	Spectrum Center; 0	6–4
11	January 15	@ Milwaukee	L 109–112	Luka Dončić (28)	Willie Cauley-Stein (11)	Luka Dončić (13)	Fiserv Forum; 0	6–5
12	January 17	Chicago	L 101–117	Luka Dončić (36)	Luka Dončić (16)	Luka Dončić (15)	American Airlines Center; 0	6–6
13	January 18	@ Toronto	L 93–116	Kristaps Porziņģis (23)	Kristaps Porziņģis (9)	Luka Dončić (9)	Amalie Arena; 0	6–7
14	January 20	@ Indiana	W 124–112	Kristaps Porziņģis (27)	Kristaps Porziņģis (13)	Luka Dončić (12)	Bankers Life Fieldhouse; 0	7–7
15	January 22	@ San Antonio	W 122–117	Luka Dončić (36)	Luka Dončić (9)	Luka Dončić (11)	AT&T Center; 0	8–7
16	January 23	Houston	L 108–133	Luka Dončić (26)	Boban Marjanović (12)	Luka Dončić (8)	American Airlines Center; 0	8–8
17	January 25	Denver	L 113–117	Luka Dončić (35)	Luka Dončić (11)	Luka Dončić (16)	American Airlines Center; 0	8–9
18	January 27	@ Utah	L 104–116	Luka Dončić (30)	James Johnson (7)	Luka Dončić (6)	Vivint Arena; 1,932	8–10
19	January 29	@ Utah	L 101–120	Luka Dončić (25)	Kristaps Porziņģis (9)	Luka Dončić (7)	Vivint Arena; 1,932	8–11
20	January 30	Phoenix	L 105–111	Luka Dončić (29)	Willie Cauley-Stein (9)	Luka Dončić (7)	American Airlines Center; 0	8–12

February: 8–4 (home: 6–3; road: 2–1)

Game	Date	Team	Score	High points	High rebounds	High assists	Location Attendance	Record
21	February 1	Phoenix	L 108–109	Luka Dončić (25)	Kristaps Porziņģis (10)	Luka Dončić (8)	American Airlines Center; 0	8–13
22	February 3	@ Atlanta	W 122–116	Luka Dončić (27)	Kristaps Porziņģis (11)	Luka Dončić (14)	State Farm Arena; 0	9–13
23	February 4	Golden State	L 116–147	Luka Dončić (27)	Maxi Kleber (7)	Luka Dončić (6)	American Airlines Center; 0	9–14
24	February 6	Golden State	W 134–132	Luka Dončić (42)	Kristaps Porziņģis (10)	Luka Dončić (11)	American Airlines Center; 0	10–14
25	February 8	Minnesota	W 127–122	Kristaps Porziņģis (27)	Kristaps Porziņģis (13)	Josh Richardson (8)	American Airlines Center; 1,000	11–14
26	February 10	Atlanta	W 118–117	Luka Dončić (28)	Luka Dončić (10)	Luka Dončić (10)	American Airlines Center; 1,000	12–14
27	February 12	New Orleans	W 143–130	Luka Dončić (46)	Luka Dončić (8)	Luka Dončić (12)	American Airlines Center; 1,514	13–14
28	February 14	Portland	L 118–121	Luka Dončić (44)	Kristaps Porziņģis (8)	Luka Dončić (9)	American Airlines Center; 2,211	13–15
–	February 17	Detroit	Postponed (winter storm) (Makeup date: April 21) (Note: The game originally scheduled for February 17, was postponed due to the February 2021 North American ice storm.)					
–	February 19	@ Houston	Postponed (winter storm) (Makeup date: April 7) (Note: The game originally scheduled for February 19, was postponed due to the February 2021 North American ice storm.)					
29	February 22	Memphis	W 102–92	Tim Hardaway Jr. (29)	Dorian Finney-Smith (9)	Luka Dončić (5)	American Airlines Center; 2,099	14–15
30	February 23	Boston	W 110–107	Luka Dončić (31)	Luka Dončić (10)	Luka Dončić (8)	American Airlines Center; 3,338	15–15
31	February 25	@ Philadelphia	L 97–111	Luka Dončić (19)	Boban Marjanović (12)	Luka Dončić (4)	Wells Fargo Center; 0	15–16
32	February 27	@ Brooklyn	W 115–98	Luka Dončić (27)	Dorian Finney-Smith (8)	Luka Dončić (7)	Barclays Center; 684	16–16

March: 9–5 (home: 3–2; road: 6–3)

Game	Date	Team	Score	High points	High rebounds	High assists	Location Attendance	Record
33	March 1	@ Orlando	W 130–124	Luka Dončić (33)	Dončić, Porziņģis (10)	Luka Dončić (9)	Amway Center; 3,766	17–16
34	March 3	Oklahoma City	W 87–78	Hardaway Jr., Porziņģis (9)	Kristaps Porziņģis (13)	Trey Burke (6)	American Airlines Center; 3,508	18–16
35	March 10	San Antonio	W 115–104	Kristaps Porziņģis (28)	Kristaps Porziņģis (14)	Luka Dončić (12)	American Airlines Center; 3,813	19–16
36	March 11	@ Oklahoma City	L 108–116	Josh Richardson (27)	Dorian Finney-Smith (8)	Josh Richardson (6)	Chesapeake Energy Arena; 0	19–17
37	March 13	@ Denver	W 116–103	Kristaps Porziņģis (25)	Dwight Powell (11)	Luka Dončić (12)	Ball Arena; 0	20–17
38	March 15	L. A. Clippers	L 99–109	Luka Dončić (25)	Luka Dončić (10)	Luka Dončić (16)	American Airlines Center; 3,945	20–18
39	March 17	L. A. Clippers	W 105–89	Luka Dončić (42)	Kristaps Porziņģis (13)	Luka Dončić (9)	American Airlines Center; 3,975	21–18
40	March 19	@ Portland	L 119–125	Luka Dončić (38)	Luka Dončić (9)	Luka Dončić (9)	Moda Center; 0	21–19
41	March 21	@ Portland	W 132–92	Luka Dončić (37)	Kristaps Porziņģis (8)	three players (4)	Moda Center; 0	22–19
42	March 24	@ Minnesota	W 128–108	Kristaps Porziņģis (29)	Jalen Brunson (11)	Jalen Brunson (5)	Target Center; 0	23–19
43	March 26	Indiana	L 94–109	Kristaps Porziņģis (31)	Kristaps Porziņģis (18)	Porziņģis, Richardson (3)	American Airlines Center; 4,132	23–20
44	March 27	New Orleans	L 103–112	Tim Hardaway Jr. (30)	Boban Marjanović (11)	three players (4)	Smoothie King Center; 3,700	23–21
45	March 29	@ Oklahoma City	W 127–106	Luka Dončić (25)	Kristaps Porziņģis (9)	Jalen Brunson (7)	Chesapeake Energy Arena; 0	24–21
46	March 31	@ Boston	W 113–108	Luka Dončić (36)	Dorian Finney-Smith (9)	Luka Dončić (5)	TD Garden; 2,298	25–21

April: 10–6 (home: 5–4; road: 5–2)

Game	Date	Team	Score	High points	High rebounds	High assists	Location Attendance	Record
47	April 2	@ New York	W 99–86	Luka Dončić (26)	Dorian Finney-Smith (9)	Luka Dončić (7)	Madison Square Garden; 1,981	26–21
48	April 3	@ Washington	W 109–87	Luka Dončić (26)	Boban Marjanović (12)	Luka Dončić (6)	Capital One Arena; 0	27–21
49	April 5	Utah	W 111–103	Luka Dončić (31)	Luka Dončić (9)	Luka Dončić (8)	American Airlines Center; 4,261	28–21
50	April 7	@ Houston	L 93–102	Dončić, Porziņģis (23)	Kristaps Porziņģis (12)	Luka Dončić (5)	Toyota Center; 3,399	28–22
51	April 8	Milwaukee	W 116–101	Luka Dončić (27)	Kristaps Porziņģis (17)	Luka Dončić (9)	American Airlines Center; 4,190	29–22
52	April 11	San Antonio	L 117–119	Kristaps Porziņģis (31)	Kristaps Porziņģis (15)	Luka Dončić (7)	American Airlines Center; 4,054	29–23
53	April 12	Philadelphia	L 95–113	Luka Dončić (32)	Dorian Finney-Smith (11)	Luka Dončić (4)	American Airlines Center; 4,016	29–24
54	April 14	@ Memphis	W 114–113	Luka Dončić (29)	Brunson, Kleber (8)	Brunson, Dončić (9)	FedExForum; 2,141	30–24
55	April 16	New York	L 109–117	Kristaps Porziņģis (23)	Kristaps Porziņģis (12)	Luka Dončić (19)	American Airlines Center; 4,246	30–25
56	April 18	Sacramento	L 107–121	Luka Dončić (30)	Luka Dončić (8)	Luka Dončić (4)	American Airlines Center; 4,193	30–26
57	April 21	Detroit	W 127–117	Luka Dončić (37)	Luka Dončić (10)	Luka Dončić (9)	American Airlines Center; 4,043	31–26
58	April 22	L. A. Lakers	W 115–110	Luka Dončić (30)	Luka Dončić (9)	Luka Dončić (8)	American Airlines Center; 4,443	32–26
59	April 24	L. A. Lakers	W 108–93	Dwight Powell (25)	Dwight Powell (10)	Luka Dončić (13)	American Airlines Center; 4,561	33–26
60	April 26	@ Sacramento	L 106–113	Luka Dončić (24)	three players (7)	Luka Dončić (8)	Golden 1 Center; 0	33–27
61	April 27	@ Golden State	W 133–103	Luka Dončić (39)	Finney-Smith, Powell (8)	Luka Dončić (8)	Chase Center; 3,613	34–27
62	April 29	@ Detroit	W 115–105	Tim Hardaway Jr. (42)	three players (7)	Jalen Brunson (4)	Little Caesars Arena; 750	35–27

May: 7–3 (home: 5–1; road: 2–2)

Game	Date	Team	Score	High points	High rebounds	High assists	Location Attendance	Record
63	May 1	Washington	W 125–124	Luka Dončić (31)	Cauley-Stein, Dončić (12)	Luka Dončić (20)	American Airlines Center; 4,351	36–27
64	May 2	Sacramento	L 99–111	Luka Dončić (30)	Marjanović, Powell (7)	Luka Dončić (6)	American Airlines Center; 4,268	36–28
65	May 4	@ Miami	W 127–113	Tim Hardaway Jr. (36)	Luka Dončić (12)	Luka Dončić (8)	American Airlines Arena; 0	37–28
66	May 6	Brooklyn	W 113–109	Luka Dončić (24)	Dončić, Powell (10)	Luka Dončić (8)	American Airlines Center; 4,602	38–28
67	May 7	Cleveland	W 110–90	Luka Dončić (24)	Luka Dončić (8)	Jalen Brunson (6)	American Airlines Center; 4,220	39–28
68	May 9	@ Cleveland	W 124–97	Tim Hardaway Jr. (25)	Dwight Powell (9)	Luka Dončić (5)	Rocket Mortgage FieldHouse; 4,148	40–28
69	May 11	@ Memphis	L 104–133	Tim Hardaway Jr. (19)	Willie Cauley-Stein (8)	Luka Dončić (5)	FedExForum; 2,684	40–29
70	May 12	New Orleans	W 125–107	Luka Dončić (33)	Dončić, Powell (8)	Luka Dončić (8)	American Airlines Center; 4,373	41–29
71	May 14	Toronto	W 114–110	Kristaps Porziņģis (21)	Dončić, Porziņģis (10)	Luka Dončić (11)	American Airlines Center; 4,493	42–29
72	May 16	@ Minnesota	L 121–136	Dončić, Porziņģis (18)	Dwight Powell (8)	Luka Dončić (2)	Target Center; 1,638	42–30

2020–21 season schedule

=== Postseason ===
2021 playoff game log
Total: 3–4 (home: 0–3; road: 3–1)
First round: 3–4 (home: 0–3; road: 3–1)

Game	Date	Team	Score	High points	High rebounds	High assists	Location Attendance	Series
1	May 22	@ L. A. Clippers	W 113–103	Luka Dončić (31)	Luka Dončić (10)	Luka Dončić (11)	Staples Center; 6,117	1–0
2	May 25	@ L. A. Clippers	W 127–121	Luka Dončić (39)	Luka Dončić (7)	Luka Dončić (7)	Staples Center; 6,885	2–0
3	May 28	L. A. Clippers	L 108–118	Luka Dončić (44)	Luka Dončić (9)	Luka Dončić (9)	American Airlines Center; 17,705	2–1
4	May 30	L. A. Clippers	L 81–106	Luka Dončić (19)	Dorian Finney-Smith (8)	Luka Dončić (6)	American Airlines Center; 17,761	2–2
5	June 2	@ L. A. Clippers	W 105–100	Luka Dončić (42)	Luka Dončić (8)	Luka Dončić (14)	Staples Center; 7,428	3–2
6	June 4	L. A. Clippers	L 97–104	Luka Dončić (29)	Boban Marjanović (9)	Luka Dončić (11)	American Airlines Center; 18,324	3–3
7	June 6	@ L. A. Clippers	L 111–126	Luka Dončić (46)	Kristaps Porziņģis (11)	Luka Dončić (14)	Staples Center; 7,342	3–4

2021 playoff schedule

== Player statistics ==
=== Regular season ===
Player	POS	GP	GS	MP	REB	AST	STL	BLK	PTS	MPG	RPG	APG	SPG	BPG	PPG
Tim Hardaway Jr.	SG	70	31	1,985	229	126	31	11	1,163	28.4	3.3	1.8	.4	.2	16.6
Jalen Brunson	PG	68	12	1,697	231	239	35	1	857	25.0	3.4	3.5	.5	.0	12.6
Luka Dončić	PG	66	66	2,262	527	567	64	36	1,830	34.3	8.0	8.6	1.0	.5	27.7
Trey Burke	PG	62	1	911	54	81	36	7	411	14.7	.9	1.3	.6	.1	6.6
Dorian Finney-Smith	PF	60	60	1,921	326	102	52	25	590	32.0	5.4	1.7	.9	.4	9.8
Josh Richardson	SG	59	56	1,790	195	153	61	24	715	30.3	3.3	2.6	1.0	.4	12.1
Dwight Powell	C	58	19	966	234	63	36	30	342	16.7	4.0	1.1	.6	.5	5.9
Willie Cauley-Stein	C	53	16	906	236	35	21	43	280	17.1	4.5	.7	.4	.8	5.3
Maxi Kleber	PF	50	40	1,341	260	68	24	35	353	26.8	5.2	1.4	.5	.7	7.1
Kristaps Porziņģis	C	43	43	1,327	381	68	20	58	865	30.9	8.9	1.6	.5	1.3	20.1
Josh Green	SG	39	5	445	78	28	16	3	101	11.4	2.0	.7	.4	.1	2.6
Boban Marjanović	C	33	3	271	128	10	2	6	156	8.2	3.9	.3	.1	.2	4.7
James Johnson^{†}	PF	29	1	504	86	50	24	23	166	17.4	3.0	1.7	.8	.8	5.7
Nicolò Melli^{†}	PF	23	4	325	65	19	5	2	91	14.1	2.8	.8	.2	.1	4.0
Wes Iwundu^{†}	SF	23	3	288	44	10	9	3	49	12.5	1.9	.4	.4	.1	2.1
Nate Hinton	SG	21	0	93	9	8	7	2	41	4.4	.4	.4	.3	.1	2.0
Tyler Bey	SF	18	0	71	19	3	0	1	18	3.9	1.1	.2	.0	.1	1.0
JJ Redick^{†}	SG	13	0	147	12	11	2	1	57	11.3	.9	.8	.2	.1	4.4
Tyrell Terry	PG	11	0	56	6	6	5	0	11	5.1	.5	.5	.5	.0	1.0

- ^{†} Denotes player spent time with another team in the season. Stats reflect time with the Mavericks only.

=== Playoffs ===
Player	POS	GP	GS	MP	REB	AST	STL	BLK	PTS	MPG	RPG	APG	SPG	BPG	PPG
Luka Dončić	PG	7	7	281	55	72	9	3	250	40.1	7.9	10.3	1.3	.4	35.7
Dorian Finney-Smith	PF	7	7	271	46	15	8	2	72	38.7	6.6	2.1	1.1	.3	10.3
Tim Hardaway Jr.	SG	7	7	262	23	10	3	0	119	37.4	3.3	1.4	.4	.0	17.0
Kristaps Porziņģis	C	7	7	233	38	9	9	5	92	33.3	5.4	1.3	1.3	.7	13.1
Maxi Kleber	PF	7	4	187	25	10	3	0	37	26.7	3.6	1.4	.4	.0	5.3
Jalen Brunson	PG	7	0	114	18	10	0	0	56	16.3	2.6	1.4	.0	.0	8.0
Josh Richardson	SG	7	0	94	11	5	2	0	34	13.4	1.6	.7	.3	.0	4.9
Dwight Powell	C	7	0	52	13	6	2	0	19	7.4	1.9	.9	.3	.0	2.7
Willie Cauley-Stein	C	6	0	63	16	3	2	4	15	10.5	2.7	.5	.3	.7	2.5
Boban Marjanović	C	4	3	83	32	4	0	1	47	20.8	8.0	1.0	.0	.3	11.8
Nicolò Melli	PF	3	0	19	6	0	1	0	0	6.3	2.0	.0	.3	.0	.0
Trey Burke	PG	2	0	17	1	1	0	0	1	8.5	.5	.5	.0	.0	.5
Josh Green	SG	1	0	4	0	0	0	0	0	4.0	.0	.0	.0	.0	.0

== Transactions ==
=== Trades ===
November 18, 2020	To Dallas Mavericks Josh Richardson; Draft rights to Tyler Bey	To Philadelphia 76ers Seth Curry
November 27, 2020	To Dallas Mavericks James Johnson	To Detroit Pistons Delon Wright
November 27, 2020	To Oklahoma City Thunder Justin Jackson
March 26, 2021	To Dallas Mavericks JJ Redick; Nicolò Melli	To New Orleans Pelicans James Johnson; Wes Iwundu; Second-round pick

=== Free agents ===
==== Subtractions ====
Player	Reason left	New team
J. J. Barea	Waived	(Spain) Estudiantes
Willie Cauley-Stein	Restructured contract	Dallas Mavericks
Antonius Cleveland	Free agent	Oklahoma City Thunder
Freddie Gillespie	Waived	Memphis Hustle
Michael Kidd-Gilchrist	Free agent	New York Knicks
Courtney Lee	Restructured contract/ Waived after training camp	
Devonte Patterson	Waived	
Josh Reaves	Free agent	Rio Grande Valley Vipers

== Awards ==
Player	Award	Date awarded
Luka Dončić	Player of the week	January 4–10
Luka Dončić	Player of the week	March 29 – April 4
Luka Dončić	Player of the week	April 19–25
Luka Dončić	All-Star	February 19, 2021
Luka Dončić	All-NBA First Team	June 15, 2021
