= Tyrell Terry =

American basketball player (born 2000)

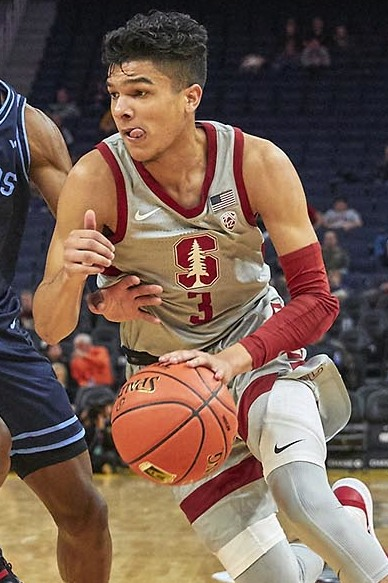
- Terry with Stanford in 2019

Personal information
- Born: September 28, 2000 (age 26) Valley City, North Dakota, U.S.
- Listed height: 6 ft 2 in (1.88 m)
- Listed weight: 160 lb (73 kg)

Career information
- High school: DeLaSalle (Minneapolis, Minnesota)
- College: Stanford (2019–2020)
- NBA draft: 2020: 2nd round, 31st overall pick
- Drafted by: Dallas Mavericks
- Playing career: 2020–2024
- Position: Point guard
- Number: 1, 3

Career history
- 2020–2021: Dallas Mavericks
- 2021: →Memphis Hustle
- 2021–2022: Memphis Grizzlies
- 2022: →Memphis Hustle
- 2024: Limoges CSP

Career highlights
- Pac-12 All-Freshman Team (2020)
- Stats at NBA.com
- Stats at Basketball Reference

Tyrell Nate Terry (born September 28, 2000) is an American professional basketball player. He played college basketball for the Stanford Cardinal.

Terry was selected 31st overall in the 2020 NBA draft by the Dallas Mavericks. He spent one season with the team before he was waived. Terry also played for the Memphis Grizzlies from December 2021 to July 2022. He retired prematurely from professional basketball in December 2022 due to anxiety issues before returning in 2024.

== Early life ==
Terry was born in Valley City, North Dakota, to Carrie Grise, and he moved with his mother to Minneapolis when he was five years old. He played basketball for DeLaSalle High School. As a freshman, he helped his team win the Class 3A state championship to become the first team in Minnesota to win five straight titles. He also led DeLaSalle to 3A state titles as a sophomore and senior. As a junior, Columbia Heights High School ended DeLaSalle's streak of state titles in the semi-finals. In his senior season, Terry was named a finalist for the Minnesota Mr. Basketball award. He scored 22 points in the 2019 title game.

== College career ==
On November 6, 2019, Terry made his debut for Stanford, recording 14 points, four rebounds and four assists in a 73–62 win over Montana. On November 21, he registered his first career double-double with 21 points and 10 rebounds in an 81–50 victory over William & Mary. In his next game, Terry had another double-double, posting 20 points and 11 rebounds in a 73–54 win over Oklahoma. On January 13, 2020, he was named Pac-12 Conference Freshman of the Week after averaging 16.5 points, 7.5 rebounds and 4.5 assists per game in wins over Washington and Washington State. On February 26, Terry scored a career-high 27 points with seven three-pointers to lead his team past Utah, 70–62. This performance, along with a 12-point effort to upset 21st-ranked Colorado, helped him earn Pac-12 Freshman of the Week honors on March 2. At the end of the regular season, Terry was named to the Pac-12 All-Freshman Team and All-Pac-12 honorable mention. As a freshman, he averaged 14.7 points, 4.5 rebounds, 3.2 assists and 1.4 steals per game. His shooting accuracy, with a 40.8 three-point percentage and team-high 89.1 free throw percentage, helped him gain attention as an NBA prospect. Following the season, Terry declared for the 2020 NBA draft. On July 31, Terry announced he was remaining in the draft.

== Professional career ==
=== Dallas Mavericks (2020–2021) ===
It was reported that Terry broke a record for a basketball IQ test administered by several NBA front offices during the 2020 offseason. He was selected in the second round of the 2020 NBA draft with the 31st pick by the Dallas Mavericks. He was signed on December 1, 2020. Terry would make his NBA debut on Christmas Day when the Mavericks faced off against the Los Angeles Lakers. Terry would only play for less than two minutes, substituting at the end of the 4th quarter for teammate Trey Burke and recorded 2 points and 1 assist in a 115 - 138 loss.

After playing 11 games from December 25, 2020 to January 29, 2021 and averaging 5.1 minutes and 1 point per game, Terry would not play for the Mavericks for the remainder of the season as he was assigned to the Memphis Hustle of the NBA G League. He made his debut for the Hustle on February 10, 2021 and recorded 19 points, 4 rebounds and 3 assists in a 111 - 119 loss to the Austin Spurs. Five days later on February 15th, Terry recorded a double-double of 17 points and 11 rebounds as the Hustle defeated the Salt Lake City Stars 104 - 96.

Although he averaged 14.7 points, 5.1 rebounds and 3.2 assists in 13 games, the Hustle finished the season 6 - 9 and missed the playoffs.

Terry would be waived by the Mavericks on October 15, 2021, six days before the Mavericks' season opener.

=== Memphis Grizzlies (2021–2022) ===
On December 25, 2021, Terry signed a 10-day contract with the Memphis Grizzlies, via the hardship exemption. The next day, he played his first game for the Grizzlies and recorded 2 points in 3 minutes as the Grizzlies defeated the Sacramento Kings 127 - 102.

On January 1, 2022, he was signed to a two-way contract and spent the remainder of the season in the G League. In 16 games, Terry averaged 12.1 points, 2.7 rebounds and 3.8 assists. However, the Hustle finished the season 15 - 19 (6 - 10 in the games that Terry played) and again missed the playoffs.

On July 2, Terry was waived by the Grizzlies.

On December 15, 2022, Terry announced his retirement from professional basketball, citing mental health reasons.

=== Limoges CSP (2024) ===
On August 3, 2024, Terry signed with Limoges CSP of the LNB Élite, marking his return to professional basketball. On October 10, Terry left the team after two games. He had 8 points, 1.5 rebounds and 1.5 assists per game.

== National team career ==
In 2018, Terry played for the United States national team at the Albert Schweitzer Tournament, a U18 tournament in Mannheim, Germany. In five games, he averaged 6.6 points, 2.6 assists and 1.8 steals per game and helped his team finish in seventh place in the tournament.

== Career statistics ==
Legend
GP	Games played	GS	Games started	MPG	Minutes per game
FG%	Field goal percentage	3P%	3-point field goal percentage	FT%	Free throw percentage
RPG	Rebounds per game	APG	Assists per game	SPG	Steals per game
BPG	Blocks per game	PPG	Points per game	**Bold**	Career high

=== NBA ===
==== Regular season ====
Year	Team	GP	GS	MPG	FG%	3P%	FT%	RPG	APG	SPG	BPG	PPG
2020–21	Dallas	**11**	0	**5.1**	.313	.000	**.333**	**.5**	**.5**	**.5**	.0	**1.0**
2021–22	Memphis	2	0	1.5	**1.000**	—	—	.0	.0	.0	.0	**1.0**
Career		13	0	4.5	.353	.000	.333	.5	.5	.4	.0	1.0

=== College ===
Year	Team	GP	GS	MPG	FG%	3P%	FT%	RPG	APG	SPG	BPG	PPG
2019–20	Stanford	31	31	32.6	.441	.408	.891	4.5	3.2	1.4	.1	14.6
