= 2020–21 Miami Heat season =

NBA professional basketball team season

- Head coach: Erik Spoelstra
- President: Pat Riley
- General manager: Andy Elisburg
- Owner: Micky Arison
- Arena: American Airlines Arena

Results
- Record: 40–32 (.556)
- Place: Division: 2nd (Southeast); Conference: 6th (Eastern)
- Playoff finish: First round (lost to Bucks 0–4)
- Stats at Basketball Reference

Local media
- Television: Bally Sports Sun (Note: Formerly Fox Sports Sun until March 31, 2021)
- Radio: 790 AM, "The Ticket"

The 2020–21 Miami Heat season was the 33rd season of the franchise in the National Basketball Association (NBA).

The Heat entered the season as both the defending Southeast Division and Eastern Conference champions. The season began just 72 days after the completion of the 2020 Finals, giving the Heat and the Los Angeles Lakers the shortest off-season in league history. With a win over the Boston Celtics 129–121, the Heat returned to the playoffs for the second straight year on May 11. They attempted to make back-to-back NBA Finals appearances for the first time since 2013 and 2014 but fell to the eventual champion Milwaukee Bucks in the first round in a four-game sweep in a rematch of last season's Conference semifinals in which the Heat won in five games. This is the first time that the Heat were swept in the playoffs since 2007, which was also in the first round against the Chicago Bulls. It was also the first time since 2014 that Andre Iguodala missed the NBA Finals. Iguodala would return to the Golden State Warriors the following season after two seasons with the Heat.

== Draft picks ==
Round	Pick	Player	Position	Nationality	School/club team
1	20	Precious Achiuwa	PF	Nigeria	Memphis

== Roster ==
2020–21 Miami Heat roster
Players

Pos.	No.	Player	Height	Weight	DOB	From
F	5	Precious Achiuwa	6 ft 8 in (2.03 m)	225 lb (102 kg)	1999-09-19	Memphis
F/C	13	Bam Adebayo	6 ft 10 in (2.08 m)	255 lb (116 kg)	1997-07-18	Kentucky
F	8	Trevor Ariza	6 ft 8 in (2.03 m)	215 lb (98 kg)	1985-06-30	UCLA
F	70	Nemanja Bjelica	6 ft 10 in (2.08 m)	234 lb (106 kg)	1988-05-09	Serbia
F	22	Jimmy Butler	6 ft 8 in (2.03 m)	230 lb (104 kg)	1989-09-14	Marquette
C	21	Dewayne Dedmon	7 ft 0 in (2.13 m)	245 lb (111 kg)	1989-08-12	USC
G	7	Goran Dragić	6 ft 3 in (1.91 m)	190 lb (86 kg)	1986-05-06	Slovenia
F	40	Udonis Haslem	6 ft 8 in (2.03 m)	235 lb (107 kg)	1980-06-09	Florida
G	14	Tyler Herro	6 ft 5 in (1.96 m)	195 lb (88 kg)	2000-01-20	Kentucky
G/F	28	Andre Iguodala	6 ft 6 in (1.98 m)	215 lb (98 kg)	1984-01-28	Arizona
G	25	Kendrick Nunn	6 ft 2 in (1.88 m)	190 lb (86 kg)	1995-08-03	Oakland
G/F	11	KZ Okpala	6 ft 9 in (2.06 m)	215 lb (98 kg)	1999-04-28	Stanford
G	4	Victor Oladipo	6 ft 4 in (1.93 m)	213 lb (97 kg)	1994-05-04	Indiana
G	55	Duncan Robinson	6 ft 7 in (2.01 m)	215 lb (98 kg)	1994-04-22	Michigan
G/F	31	Max Strus (TW)	6 ft 5 in (1.96 m)	215 lb (98 kg)	1996-03-28	DePaul
G	2	Gabe Vincent (TW)	6 ft 3 in (1.91 m)	200 lb (91 kg)	1996-06-14	UC Santa Barbara
C	77	Ömer Yurtseven	7 ft 0 in (2.13 m)	275 lb (125 kg)	1998-06-19	Georgetown

Coaches
Head coach
- Erik Spoelstra
Assistant(s)
- Malik Allen
- Caron Butler
- Octavio De La Grana
- Chris Quinn

Legend
- (DP) Unsigned draft pick
- (FA) Free agent
- (S) Suspended
- (GL) On assignment to G League affiliate
- (TW) Two-way affiliate player
- Injured

Roster
Updated: May 14, 2021

== Standings ==
=== Division ===
Southeast Division	W	L	PCT	GB	Home	Road	Div	GP
y – Atlanta Hawks	41	31	.569	–	25‍–‍11	16‍–‍20	9–3	72
x – Miami Heat	40	32	.556	1.0	21‍–‍15	19‍–‍17	6–6	72
x – Washington Wizards	34	38	.472	7.0	19‍–‍17	15‍–‍21	3–9	72
pi – Charlotte Hornets	33	39	.458	8.0	18‍–‍19	15‍–‍20	8–4	72
Orlando Magic	21	51	.292	20.0	11‍–‍25	10‍–‍26	4–8	72

=== Conference ===
Eastern Conference
#	Team	W	L	PCT	GB	GP
1	c − Philadelphia 76ers *	49	23	.681	–	72
2	x – Brooklyn Nets	48	24	.667	1.0	72
3	y – Milwaukee Bucks *	46	26	.639	3.0	72
4	x – New York Knicks	41	31	.569	8.0	72
5	y – Atlanta Hawks *	41	31	.569	8.0	72
6	x – Miami Heat	40	32	.556	9.0	72
7	x – Boston Celtics	36	36	.500	13.0	72
8	x – Washington Wizards	34	38	.472	15.0	72
9	pi – Indiana Pacers	34	38	.472	15.0	72
10	pi – Charlotte Hornets	33	39	.458	16.0	72
11	Chicago Bulls	31	41	.431	18.0	72
12	Toronto Raptors	27	45	.375	22.0	72
13	Cleveland Cavaliers	22	50	.306	27.0	72
14	Orlando Magic	21	51	.292	28.0	72
15	Detroit Pistons	20	52	.278	29.0	72

Notes

- z – Clinched home court advantage for the entire playoffs
- c – Clinched home court advantage for the conference playoffs
- y – Clinched division title
- x – Clinched playoff spot
- pb – Clinched play-in spot
- o – Eliminated from playoff contention
- * – Division leader

== Game log ==
=== Preseason ===
2020 preseason game log
Total: 1–1 (home: 0–1; road: 1–0)
Preseason: 1–1 (home: 0–1; road: 1–0)

Game	Date	Team	Score	High points	High rebounds	High assists	Location Attendance	Record
1	December 14	New Orleans	L 92–114	Tyler Herro (17)	Max Strus (8)	Bam Adebayo (8)	American Airlines Arena	0–1
2	December 18	@ Toronto	W 117–105	KZ Okpala (24)	Precious Achiuwa (15)	Goran Dragić (8)	Amalie Arena	1–1

2020–21 season schedule

=== Regular season ===
2020–21 game log
Total: 40–32 (home: 21–15; road: 19–17)
December: 2–2 (home: 2–1; road: 0–1)

Game	Date	Team	Score	High points	High rebounds	High assists	Location Attendance	Record
1	December 23	@ Orlando	L 107–113	Bam Adebayo (25)	Bam Adebayo (11)	Butler, Dragić (7)	Amway Center; 3,396	0–1
2	December 25	New Orleans	W 111–98	Duncan Robinson (23)	Andre Iguodala (7)	Goran Dragić (9)	American Airlines Arena; 0	1–1
3	December 29	Milwaukee	L 97–144	Tyler Herro (23)	Bam Adebayo (6)	Tyler Herro (7)	American Airlines Arena; Limited seating	1–2
4	December 30	Milwaukee	W 119–108	Goran Dragić (26)	Tyler Herro (15)	Bam Adebayo (10)	American Airlines Arena; Limited seating	2–2

January: 5–10 (home: 3–4; road: 2–6)

Game	Date	Team	Score	High points	High rebounds	High assists	Location Attendance	Record
5	January 1	@ Dallas	L 83–93	Bam Adebayo (19)	Bam Adebayo (11)	Goran Dragić (7)	American Airlines Center; 0	2–3
6	January 4	Oklahoma City	W 118–90	Bam Adebayo (20)	Tyler Herro (9)	Tyler Herro (8)	American Airlines Arena; Limited seating	3–3
7	January 6	Boston	L 105–107	Jimmy Butler (26)	Adebayo, Butler (8)	Bam Adebayo (10)	American Airlines Arena; Limited seating	3–4
8	January 9	@ Washington	W 128–124	Tyler Herro (31)	Bam Adebayo (16)	Jimmy Butler (9)	Capital One Arena; 0	4–4
–	January 10	@ Boston	Postponed (COVID-19) (Makeup date: May 11)					
9	January 12	@ Philadelphia	L 134–137	Tyler Herro (34)	Precious Achiuwa (13)	Andre Iguodala (7)	Wells Fargo Center; 0	4–5
10	January 14	@ Philadelphia	L 108–125	Duncan Robinson (22)	Precious Achiuwa (11)	Vincent, Iguodala (8)	Wells Fargo Center; 0	4–6
11	January 16	Detroit	L 100–120	Bam Adebayo (28)	Bam Adebayo (7)	Goran Dragić (7)	American Airlines Arena; Limited seating	4–7
12	January 18	Detroit	W 113–107	Bam Adebayo (28)	Bam Adebayo (11)	Bam Adebayo (5)	American Airlines Arena; Limited seating	5–7
13	January 20	@ Toronto	W 111–102	Kendrick Nunn (28)	Bam Adebayo (13)	Kelly Olynyk (8)	Amalie Arena; 0	6–7
14	January 22	@ Toronto	L 81–101	Kendrick Nunn (22)	Bam Adebayo (8)	Kendrick Nunn (5)	Amalie Arena; 0	6–8
15	January 23	@ Brooklyn	L 124–128	Bam Adebayo (41)	Kelly Olynyk (6)	Iguodala, Olynyk (3)	Barclays Center; 0	6–9
16	January 25	@ Brooklyn	L 85–98	Bam Adebayo (26)	Bam Adebayo (10)	Adebayo, Dragić (5)	Barclays Center; 0	6–10
17	January 27	Denver	L 82–109	Bam Adebayo (15)	Bam Adebayo (7)	Bam Adebayo (6)	American Airlines Arena; Limited seating	6–11
18	January 28	L. A. Clippers	L 105–109	Tyler Herro (19)	Bam Adebayo (13)	Bam Adebayo (7)	American Airlines Arena; Limited seating	6–12
19	January 30	Sacramento	W 105–104	Jimmy Butler (30)	Bam Adebayo (13)	Jimmy Butler (8)	American Airlines Arena; Limited seating	7–12

February: 10–5 (home: 5–2; road: 5–3)

Game	Date	Team	Score	High points	High rebounds	High assists	Location Attendance	Record
20	February 1	Charlotte	L 121–129	Jimmy Butler (25)	Adebayo, Butler (9)	Dragić, Herro (8)	American Airlines Arena; Limited seating	7–13
21	February 3	Washington	L 100–103	Tyler Herro (20)	Adebayo, Olynyk (11)	Jimmy Butler (9)	American Airlines Arena; Limited seating	7–14
22	February 5	Washington	W 122–95	Kendrick Nunn (25)	Andre Iguodala (10)	Jimmy Butler (9)	American Airlines Arena; Limited seating	8–14
23	February 7	@ New York	W 109–103	Bam Adebayo (24)	Bam Adebayo (11)	Jimmy Butler (9)	Madison Square Garden; 0	9–14
24	February 9	New York	W 98–96	Jimmy Butler (26)	Jimmy Butler (8)	Jimmy Butler (10)	American Airlines Arena; Limited seating	10–14
25	February 11	@ Houston	W 101–94	Jimmy Butler (27)	Adebayo, Olynyk (13)	Jimmy Butler (10)	AT&T Center; 3,251	11–14
26	February 13	@ Utah	L 94–112	Kendrick Nunn (23)	Adebayo, Olynyk (10)	Adebayo, Herro (6)	Vivint Arena; 3,902	11–15
27	February 15	@ L. A. Clippers	L 118–125	Bam Adebayo (27)	Bam Adebayo (12)	Jimmy Butler (10)	Staples Center; 0	11–16
28	February 17	@ Golden State	L 112–120 (OT)	Bam Adebayo (24)	Tyler Herro (15)	Jimmy Butler (11)	Chase Center; 0	11–17
29	February 18	@ Sacramento	W 118–110	Tyler Herro (27)	Bam Adebayo (12)	Bam Adebayo (10)	Golden 1 Center; 0	12–17
30	February 20	@ L. A. Lakers	W 96–94	Kendrick Nunn (27)	Adebayo, Robinson (10)	Bam Adebayo (6)	Staples Center; 0	13–17
31	February 22	@ Oklahoma City	W 108–94	Duncan Robinson (22)	Bam Adebayo (13)	Butler, Nunn (9)	Chesapeake Energy Arena; 0	14–17
32	February 24	Toronto	W 116–108	Jimmy Butler (27)	Bam Adebayo (12)	Jimmy Butler (10)	American Airlines Arena; Limited seating	15–17
33	February 26	Utah	W 124–116	Jimmy Butler (33)	Bam Adebayo (11)	Jimmy Butler (8)	American Airlines Arena; Limited seating	16–17
34	February 28	Atlanta	W 109–99	Kendrick Nunn (24)	Bam Adebayo (13)	Kendrick Nunn (7)	American Airlines Arena; Limited seating	17–17

March: 7–7 (home: 2–5; road: 5–2)

Game	Date	Team	Score	High points	High rebounds	High assists	Location Attendance	Record
35	March 2	Atlanta	L 80–94	Dragić, Robinson (14)	Kelly Olynyk (6)	Goran Dragić (4)	American Airlines Arena; Limited seating	17–18
36	March 4	@ New Orleans	W 103–93	Jimmy Butler (29)	Kelly Olynyk (10)	Jimmy Butler (9)	Smoothie King Center; 2,700	18–18
37	March 11	Orlando	W 111–103	Jimmy Butler (27)	Jimmy Butler (8)	Jimmy Butler (11)	American Airlines Arena; Limited seating	19–18
38	March 12	@ Chicago	W 101–90	Jimmy Butler (28)	Goran Dragić (7)	Jimmy Butler (8)	United Center; 0	20–18
39	March 14	@ Orlando	W 102–97	Jimmy Butler (22)	Butler, Olynyk (7)	Jimmy Butler (9)	Amway Center; 3,264	21–18
40	March 16	Cleveland	W 113–98	Jimmy Butler (28)	Jimmy Butler (12)	Goran Dragić (9)	American Airlines Arena; Limited seating	22–18
41	March 17	@ Memphis	L 85–89	Jimmy Butler (24)	Bam Adebayo (12)	Bam Adebayo (6)	FedExForum; 2,217	22–19
42	March 19	Indiana	L 110–137	Bam Adebayo (20)	Adebayo, Butler (8)	Bam Adebayo (5)	American Airlines Arena; Limited seating	22–20
43	March 21	Indiana	L 106–109	Bam Adebayo (9)	Jimmy Butler (15)	Jimmy Butler (7)	American Airlines Arena; Limited seating	22–21
44	March 23	Phoenix	L 100–110	Kendrick Nunn (25)	Jimmy Butler (11)	Bam Adebayo (6)	American Airlines Arena; Limited seating	22–22
45	March 25	Portland	L 122–125	Bam Adebayo (29)	Bam Adebayo (7)	Bam Adebayo (9)	American Airlines Arena; Limited seating	22–23
46	March 26	@ Charlotte	L 105–110	Butler, Robinson (20)	Trevor Ariza (9)	Jimmy Butler (9)	Spectrum Center; 4,215	22–24
47	March 29	@ New York	W 98–88	Jimmy Butler (27)	Bam Adebayo (17)	Jimmy Butler (6)	Madison Square Garden; 1,981	23–24
48	March 31	@ Indiana	W 92–87	Duncan Robinson (20)	Adebayo, Robinson (8)	Bam Adebayo (7)	Bankers Life Fieldhouse; 0	24–24

April: 10–7 (home: 8–3; road: 2–4)

Game	Date	Team	Score	High points	High rebounds	High assists	Location Attendance	Record
49	April 1	Golden State	W 116–109	Jimmy Butler (22)	Bam Adebayo (8)	Jimmy Butler (8)	American Airlines Arena; Limited seating	25–24
50	April 3	Cleveland	W 115–101	Adebayo, Robinson (18)	Bam Adebayo (11)	Jimmy Butler (11)	American Airlines Arena; Limited seating	26–24
51	April 6	Memphis	L 112–124	Jimmy Butler (28)	Bam Adebayo (10)	Bam Adebayo (10)	American Airlines Arena; Limited seating	26–25
52	April 8	L. A. Lakers	W 110–104	Jimmy Butler (28)	Adebayo, Butler (7)	Jimmy Butler (5)	American Airlines Arena; Limited seating	27–25
53	April 11	@ Portland	W 107–98	Bam Adebayo (22)	Tyler Herro (7)	Jimmy Butler (5)	Moda Center; 0	28–25
54	April 13	@ Phoenix	L 86–106	Jimmy Butler (18)	Bam Adebayo (10)	Jimmy Butler (8)	Phoenix Suns Arena; 5,024	28–26
55	April 14	@ Denver	L 106–123	Bam Adebayo (21)	Bam Adebayo (6)	Jimmy Butler (9)	Ball Arena; 4,017	28–27
56	April 16	@ Minnesota	L 111–119	Jimmy Butler (30)	Jimmy Butler (10)	Jimmy Butler (8)	Target Center; 1,638	28–28
57	April 18	Brooklyn	W 109–107	Bam Adebayo (21)	Bam Adebayo (15)	Goran Dragić (7)	American Airlines Arena; Limited seating	29–28
58	April 19	Houston	W 113–91	Kendrick Nunn (30)	Precious Achiuwa (11)	Kendrick Nunn (8)	American Airlines Arena; Limited seating	30–28
59	April 21	@ San Antonio	W 107–87	Bam Adebayo (23)	Bam Adebayo (8)	Jimmy Butler (11)	AT&T Center; 4,229	31–28
60	April 23	@ Atlanta	L 103–118	Kendrick Nunn (21)	Trevor Ariza (10)	Jimmy Butler (7)	State Farm Arena; 2,985	31–29
61	April 24	Chicago	W 106–101	Duncan Robinson (23)	Adebayo, Dedmon, Robinson (10)	Bam Adebayo (10)	American Airlines Arena; Limited seating	32–29
62	April 26	Chicago	L 102–110	Jimmy Butler (33)	Jimmy Butler (8)	Goran Dragić (7)	American Airlines Arena; Limited seating	32–30
63	April 28	San Antonio	W 116–111	Jimmy Butler (29)	Bam Adebayo (11)	Goran Dragić (7)	American Airlines Arena; Limited seating	33–30

May: 7–2 (home: 2–1; road: 5–1)

Game	Date	Team	Score	High points	High rebounds	High assists	Location Attendance	Record
64	May 1	@ Cleveland	W 124–107	Kendrick Nunn (22)	Bam Adebayo (10)	Goran Dragić (7)	Rocket Mortgage FieldHouse; 4,148	34–30
65	May 2	@ Charlotte	W 121–111	Bam Adebayo (20)	Jimmy Butler (8)	Bam Adebayo (10)	Spectrum Center; 4,095	35–30
66	May 4	Dallas	L 113–127	Duncan Robinson (19)	Duncan Robinson (9)	Bam Adebayo (11)	American Airlines Arena; Limited seating	35–31
67	May 7	Minnesota	W 121–112	Tyler Herro (27)	Jimmy Butler (8)	Jimmy Butler 6)	American Airlines Arena; Limited seating	36–31
68	May 9	@ Boston	W 130–124	Jimmy Butler (26)	Jimmy Butler (8)	Jimmy Butler (11)	TD Garden; 2,298	37–31
69	May 11	@ Boston	W 129–121	Tyler Herro (24)	Tyler Herro (11)	Bam Adebayo (5)	TD Garden; 4,789	38–31
70	May 13	Philadelphia	W 106–94	Jimmy Butler (21)	Bam Adebayo (12)	Bam Adebayo (8)	American Airlines Arena; Limited seating	39–31
71	May 15	@ Milwaukee	L 108–122	Kendrick Nunn (31)	Bam Adebayo (8)	Bam Adebayo (8)	Fiserv Forum; 3,280	39–32
72	May 16	@ Detroit	W 120–107	Precious Achiuwa (23)	Precious Achiuwa (10)	Tyler Herro (11)	Little Caesars Arena; 750	40–32

2020–21 season schedule

=== Playoffs ===
2021 playoff game log
Total: 0–4 (home: 0–2; road: 0–2)
First Round: 0–4 (home: 0–2; road: 0–2)

Game	Date	Team	Score	High points	High rebounds	High assists	Location Attendance	Series
1	May 22	@ Milwaukee	L 107–109 (OT)	Goran Dragić (25)	Bam Adebayo (12)	Jimmy Butler (8)	Fiserv Forum; 9,107	0–1
2	May 24	@ Milwaukee	L 98–132	Dewayne Dedmon (19)	Dewayne Dedmon (9)	Adebayo, Butler, Dragić (4)	Fiserv Forum; 9,107	0–2
3	May 27	Milwaukee	L 84–113	Jimmy Butler (19)	Adebayo, Butler (8)	Jimmy Butler (6)	American Airlines Arena; 17,000	0–3
4	May 29	Milwaukee	L 103–120	Bam Adebayo (20)	Bam Adebayo (14)	Jimmy Butler (10)	American Airlines Arena; 17,000	0–4

2020 playoff schedule

== Player statistics ==
=== Regular season ===
Player	POS	GP	GS	MP	REB	AST	STL	BLK	PTS	MPG	RPG	APG	SPG	BPG	PPG
Duncan Robinson	SF	72	72	2,262	250	127	43	20	942	31.4	3.5	1.8	.6	.3	13.1
Bam Adebayo	C	64	64	2,143	573	346	75	66	1,197	33.5	9.0	5.4	1.2	1.0	18.7
Andre Iguodala	SF	63	5	1,339	221	142	57	35	275	21.3	3.5	2.3	.9	.6	4.4
Precious Achiuwa	PF	61	4	737	208	29	20	28	304	12.1	3.4	.5	.3	.5	5.0
Kendrick Nunn	PG	56	44	1,650	179	148	52	14	816	29.5	3.2	2.6	.9	.3	14.6
Tyler Herro	SG	54	15	1,635	268	184	35	17	815	30.3	5.0	3.4	.6	.3	15.1
Jimmy Butler	SF	52	52	1,745	359	369	108	18	1,116	33.6	6.9	7.1	2.1	.3	21.5
Goran Dragić	PG	50	11	1,337	169	219	33	8	672	26.7	3.4	4.4	.7	.2	13.4
Gabe Vincent	PG	50	7	655	56	67	21	2	242	13.1	1.1	1.3	.4	.0	4.8
Kelly Olynyk^{†}	C	43	38	1,157	261	91	40	26	432	26.9	6.1	2.1	.9	.6	10.0
Max Strus	SF	39	0	507	41	24	11	2	236	13.0	1.1	.6	.3	.1	6.1
KZ Okpala	PF	37	9	447	68	19	10	11	92	12.1	1.8	.5	.3	.3	2.5
Trevor Ariza	SF	30	27	841	144	55	31	18	282	28.0	4.8	1.8	1.0	.6	9.4
Dewayne Dedmon	C	16	0	210	86	12	9	6	113	13.1	5.4	.8	.6	.4	7.1
Maurice Harkless^{†}	SF	11	3	124	13	7	2	4	15	11.3	1.2	.6	.2	.4	1.4
Nemanja Bjelica^{†}	PF	11	2	156	27	20	7	3	55	14.2	2.5	1.8	.6	.3	5.0
Chris Silva^{†}	PF	11	0	83	25	6	1	5	30	7.5	2.3	.5	.1	.5	2.7
Avery Bradley^{†}	SG	10	1	211	18	14	7	1	85	21.1	1.8	1.4	.7	.1	8.5
Victor Oladipo^{†}	SG	4	4	111	14	14	7	2	48	27.8	3.5	3.5	1.8	.5	12.0
Meyers Leonard	C	3	2	29	7	2	0	0	10	9.7	2.3	.7	.0	.0	3.3
Udonis Haslem	C	1	0	3	1	0	0	0	4	3.0	1.0	.0	.0	.0	4.0

- ^{†} Denotes player spent time with another team in the season. Stats reflect time with the Heat only.

=== Playoffs ===
Player	POS	GP	GS	MP	REB	AST	STL	BLK	PTS	MPG	RPG	APG	SPG	BPG	PPG
Jimmy Butler	SF	4	4	154	30	28	5	1	58	38.5	7.5	7.0	1.3	.3	14.5
Bam Adebayo	C	4	4	136	37	17	5	2	62	34.0	9.3	4.3	1.3	.5	15.5
Duncan Robinson	SF	4	4	100	11	3	3	0	41	25.0	2.8	.8	.8	.0	10.3
Trevor Ariza	SF	4	4	96	23	2	3	1	19	24.0	5.8	.5	.8	.3	4.8
Goran Dragić	PG	4	2	117	7	11	4	2	64	29.3	1.8	2.8	1.0	.5	16.0
Kendrick Nunn	PG	4	2	93	6	6	2	0	41	23.3	1.5	1.5	.5	.0	10.3
Tyler Herro	SG	4	0	93	13	7	1	1	37	23.3	3.3	1.8	.3	.3	9.3
Andre Iguodala	SF	4	0	71	12	5	4	2	15	17.8	3.0	1.3	1.0	.5	3.8
Dewayne Dedmon	C	4	0	57	18	3	0	2	25	14.3	4.5	.8	.0	.5	6.3
Gabe Vincent	PG	3	0	14	1	2	0	0	5	4.7	.3	.7	.0	.0	1.7
Precious Achiuwa	PF	3	0	12	6	0	0	2	7	4.0	2.0	.0	.0	.7	2.3
Nemanja Bjelica	PF	2	0	30	5	2	2	1	18	15.0	2.5	1.0	1.0	.5	9.0
KZ Okpala	PF	2	0	6	0	0	0	0	0	3.0	.0	.0	.0	.0	.0
Max Strus	SF	2	0	6	0	0	0	0	0	3.0	.0	.0	.0	.0	.0

== Transactions ==
=== Re-signed ===
Player	Date Signed	Ref.
Gabe Vincent	November 21 (Two-way contract)	
Meyers Leonard	November 22	
Udonis Haslem	November 28	

=== Additions ===
Player	Signed	Former Team	Ref.
Max Strus	November 30	Chicago Bulls	
Trevor Ariza	March 17	Oklahoma City Thunder	
Nemanja Bjelica	March 25	Sacramento Kings	
Victor Oladipo	March 25	Houston Rockets	
Dewayne Dedmon	April 8	Atlanta Hawks	
Ӧmer Yurtseven	May 14	Oklahoma City Blue	

=== Subtractions ===
Player	Left Through	New Team	Ref.
Derrick Jones Jr.	Free Agency	Portland Trail Blazers	
Solomon Hill	Free Agency	Atlanta Hawks	
Jae Crowder	Free Agency	Phoenix Suns	
Meyers Leonard	Trade	Oklahoma City Thunder	
Chris Silva	Trade	Sacramento Kings	
Maurice Harkless	Trade	Sacramento Kings	
Kelly Olynyk	Trade	Houston Rockets	
Avery Bradley	Trade	Houston Rockets	
