= Wes Iwundu =

Nigerian-American basketball player (born 1994)

- Iwundu with Andorra in 2026

No. 25 – BC Andorra
- Position: Small forward / shooting guard
- League: Liga ACB

Personal information
- Born: December 20, 1994 (age 31) Houston, Texas, U.S.
- Listed height: 6 ft 6 in (1.98 m)
- Listed weight: 195 lb (88 kg)

Career information
- High school: Westfield (Houston, Texas)
- College: Kansas State (2013–2017)
- NBA draft: 2017: 2nd round, 33rd overall pick
- Drafted by: Orlando Magic
- Playing career: 2017–present

Career history
- 2017–2020: Orlando Magic
- 2017–2018: →Lakeland Magic
- 2020–2021: Dallas Mavericks
- 2021: New Orleans Pelicans
- 2021–2022: Atlanta Hawks
- 2022: Cleveland Charge
- 2022–2023: Stockton Kings
- 2023–2024: Rasta Vechta
- 2024–2025: Promitheas Patras
- 2025–2026: South East Melbourne Phoenix
- 2026: Ironi Kiryat Ata B.C.
- 2026–present: BC Andorra

Career highlights
- 2× Third-team All-Big 12 (2016, 2017)
- Stats at NBA.com
- Stats at Basketball Reference

Wesley Deshawn Iwundu (born December 20, 1994) is a Nigerian-American professional basketball player for BC Andorra of the Liga ACB. He played college basketball for the Kansas State Wildcats.

== College career ==
Iwundu was recruited by coach Bruce Weber to Kansas State out of Westfield High School in Houston. He would go on to be a starter from the beginning, breaking the Wildcats' career record for games started with 124. He came in as a part of a heralded five-man 2013 recruiting class, but ultimately was the only player who stayed at K-State past two seasons.

He was named third-team All-Big 12 Conference in both his junior and senior seasons. For his senior season, Iwundu averaged 13.0 points, 6.3 rebounds and 3.5 assists per game.

== Professional career ==
=== Orlando Magic (2017–2020) ===
Following the closure of his college career, Iwundu was invited to the 2017 NBA draft combine. In the 2017 NBA draft, Iwundu was taken in the second round by the Orlando Magic with the 33rd pick, thus becoming the first Kansas State player to be taken in an NBA draft since Michael Beasley and Bill Walker in 2008. He was assigned multiple times to the Lakeland Magic of the NBA G League during the 2017–18 season.

In three seasons with the Orlando Magic, Iwundu averaged 4.8 points, 2.5 rebounds, 1.0 assists and 17.6 minutes in 182 games (46 starts).

=== Dallas Mavericks (2020–2021) ===
On December 1, 2020, Iwundu signed with the Dallas Mavericks.

=== New Orleans Pelicans (2021) ===
On March 26, 2021, Iwundu was traded, alongside James Johnson and a second-round draft pick, to the New Orleans Pelicans in exchange for JJ Redick and Nicolò Melli.

On August 7, 2021, Iwundu was traded to the Charlotte Hornets and was later waived prior to the start of the season.

=== Atlanta Hawks (2021–2022) ===
On December 23, 2021, Iwundu signed a 10-day contract with the Atlanta Hawks.

=== Cleveland Charge (2022) ===
On January 25, 2022, Iwundu was acquired by the Cleveland Charge of the NBA G League. He was waived by the Charge on April 1 after suffering a season-ending injury.

On September 23, 2022, Iwundu signed with the Portland Trail Blazers. He was waived on October 7.

=== Stockton Kings (2022–2023) ===
On October 13, 2022, Iwundu signed with the Sacramento Kings. He was waived the following day and he subsequently joined the Stockton Kings for the 2022–23 NBA G League season.

=== Rasta Vechta (2023–2024) ===
In July 2023, Iwundu signed with Rasta Vechta of the German Bundesliga. In 36 games, he averaged 9.1 points, 4.8 rebounds and 1.5 assists per game.

=== Promitheas Patras (2024–2025) ===
In August 2024, Iwundu signed with Promitheas Patras of the Greek Basketball League.

=== South East Melbourne Phoenix (2025–2026) ===
On October 10, 2025, Iwundu signed with the South East Melbourne Phoenix of the Australian National Basketball League (NBL) for the rest of the 2025–26 season.

=== MoraBanc Andorra (2026–present) ===
On July 22, 2026, Iwundu signed with MoraBanc Andorra of the Liga ACB.

== Career statistics ==
Legend
GP	Games played	GS	Games started	MPG	Minutes per game
FG%	Field goal percentage	3P%	3-point field goal percentage	FT%	Free throw percentage
RPG	Rebounds per game	APG	Assists per game	SPG	Steals per game
BPG	Blocks per game	PPG	Points per game	**Bold**	Career high

=== NBA ===
==== Regular season ====
Year	Team	GP	GS	MPG	FG%	3P%	FT%	RPG	APG	SPG	BPG	PPG
2017–18	Orlando	62	12	16.5	.427	.196	.723	2.2	.9	**.5**	.2	3.7
2018–19	Orlando	**68**	13	18.1	.412	.367	.816	2.7	1.1	.4	**.3**	5.0
2019–20	Orlando	52	**21**	18.3	.416	.341	.804	2.5	**1.2**	**.5**	**.3**	5.8
2020–21	Dallas	23	3	12.5	.327	.130	**.857**	2.9	.4	.4	.1	2.1
2020–21	New Orleans	18	1	13.9	.340	.111	.824	2.6	.4	.3	.1	2.8
2021–22	Atlanta	3	1	**27.3**	**.444**	**.600**	.750	**4.3**	.0	.3	.0	**7.3**
Career		226	51	16.9	.408	.292	.798	2.5	.9	.5	.2	4.4

==== Playoffs ====
Year	Team	GP	GS	MPG	FG%	3P%	FT%	RPG	APG	SPG	BPG	PPG
2019	Orlando	**5**	0	12.0	**.333**	.333	**1.000**	1.4	**.8**	**.6**	.0	**4.8**
2020	Orlando	**5**	0	**15.2**	.300	**.571**	.625	**2.2**	**.8**	**.6**	**.4**	4.2
Career		10	0	13.6	.316	.438	.824	1.8	.8	.6	.2	4.5

=== NBA G League ===
==== Regular season ====
Year	Team	GP	GS	MPG	FG%	3P%	FT%	RPG	APG	SPG	BPG	PPG
2017–18	Lakeland	9	9	35.3	.405	.125	.755	8.4	2.0	1.1	.4	15.2
Career		9	9	35.3	.405	.125	.755	8.4	2.0	1.1	.4	15.2

=== College ===
Year	Team	GP	GS	MPG	FG%	3P%	FT%	RPG	APG	SPG	BPG	PPG
2013–14	Kansas State	33	32	23.6	.461	**.412**	.634	4.2	1.8	.6	.4	6.7
2014–15	Kansas State	31	24	25.2	.404	.316	.595	3.5	2.0	.7	**.6**	5.8
2015–16	Kansas State	33	32	**32.4**	.478	.200	.692	4.5	**3.7**	**1.3**	.2	11.9
2016–17	Kansas State	**35**	**35**	31.4	**.481**	.376	**.767**	**6.3**	3.5	1.0	.3	**13.0**
Career		132	123	28.2	.463	.338	.688	4.7	2.8	.9	.4	9.5

== Personal ==
Iwundu has Nigerian roots. In 2021, it was reported that he was in talks with the Nigeria national basketball team to represent Nigeria in the 2024 Summer Olympics.
