= 2020–21 Sacramento Kings season =

NBA professional basketball team season

- Head coach: Luke Walton
- General manager: Monte McNair
- Owner: Vivek Ranadivé
- Arena: Golden 1 Center

Results
- Record: 31–41 (.431)
- Place: Division: 5th (Pacific); Conference: 12th (Western)
- Playoff finish: Did not qualify
- Stats at Basketball Reference

Local media
- Television: NBC Sports California; CBS 13
- Radio: KHTK Sports 1140

The 2020–21 Sacramento Kings season was the 76th season of the franchise, its 72nd season in the National Basketball Association (NBA), and its 36th in Sacramento.

The Kings entered the season with the current longest NBA playoff appearance drought at 14 seasons, last qualifying in 2006. After the Cleveland Browns of the NFL made the playoffs for the first time since 2002 at the start of the NBA season, the Kings will be 2nd in sports for the longest active playoffs drought, behind the MLB's Seattle Mariners. On August 14, Vlade Divac resigned from his position as general manager and Monte McNair was named as his replacement on September 17. For the 15th season in a row, the Sacramento Kings failed to reach the playoffs, tying the Los Angeles Clippers for the longest NBA playoff drought and thus became the first team in NBA history to reach a 70-year title drought, not winning a title since 1951.

== Draft picks ==
| Round | Pick | Player | Position | Nationality | College / Club |
|---|---|---|---|---|---|
| 1 | 12 | Tyrese Haliburton | PG | United States | Iowa State |
| 2 | 35 | Xavier Tillman | PF | United States | Michigan State |
| 2 | 43 | Jahmi'us Ramsey | SG | United States | Texas Tech |
| 2 | 52 | Kenyon Martin Jr. | SG | United States | IMG Academy |

== Roster ==
2020–21 Sacramento Kings roster
Players

| Pos. | No. | Player | Height | Weight | DOB | From |
|---|---|---|---|---|---|---|
| F | 35 | Marvin Bagley | 6 ft 11 in (2.11 m) | 235 lb (107 kg) | 1999-03-14 | Duke |
| F | 40 | Harrison Barnes | 6 ft 8 in (2.03 m) | 225 lb (102 kg) | 1992-05-30 | North Carolina |
| G | 9 | Terence Davis | 6 ft 4 in (1.93 m) | 201 lb (91 kg) | 1997-05-16 | Mississippi |
| G | 5 | De'Aaron Fox | 6 ft 3 in (1.91 m) | 185 lb (84 kg) | 1997-12-20 | Kentucky |
| G | 7 | Kyle Guy (TW) | 6 ft 1 in (1.85 m) | 167 lb (76 kg) | 1997-08-11 | Virginia |
| G | 0 | Tyrese Haliburton | 6 ft 5 in (1.96 m) | 185 lb (84 kg) | 2000-02-29 | Iowa State |
| G/F | 8 | Maurice Harkless | 6 ft 7 in (2.01 m) | 220 lb (100 kg) | 1993-05-11 | St. John's |
| G | 24 | Buddy Hield | 6 ft 4 in (1.93 m) | 220 lb (100 kg) | 1992-12-17 | Oklahoma |
| C | 22 | Richaun Holmes | 6 ft 10 in (2.08 m) | 235 lb (107 kg) | 1993-10-15 | Bowling Green |
| G/F | 10 | Justin James | 6 ft 7 in (2.01 m) | 190 lb (86 kg) | 1997-01-24 | Wyoming |
| C | 15 | Damian Jones | 7 ft 0 in (2.13 m) | 245 lb (111 kg) | 1995-06-30 | Vanderbilt |
| F | 23 | Louis King (TW) | 6 ft 7 in (2.01 m) | 205 lb (93 kg) | 1999-04-06 | Oregon |
| F/C | 25 | Chimezie Metu | 6 ft 11 in (2.11 m) | 225 lb (102 kg) | 1997-03-22 | USC |
| G | 3 | Jahmi'us Ramsey | 6 ft 3 in (1.91 m) | 190 lb (86 kg) | 2001-06-09 | Texas Tech |
| C | 20 | Hassan Whiteside | 7 ft 0 in (2.13 m) | 265 lb (120 kg) | 1989-06-13 | Marshall |
| F | 13 | Robert Woodard | 6 ft 6 in (1.98 m) | 235 lb (107 kg) | 1999-09-12 | Mississippi State |
| G | 55 | Delon Wright | 6 ft 5 in (1.96 m) | 185 lb (84 kg) | 1992-04-26 | Utah |

Coaches
Head coach
- Luke Walton
Assistant(s)
- Alvin Gentry (Associate HC)
- Rex Kalamian
- Jesse Mermuys
- Roy Rana

Legend
- (DP) Unsigned draft pick
- (FA) Free agent
- (S) Suspended
- (GL) On assignment to G League affiliate
- (TW) Two-way affiliate player
- Injured

Roster
Updated: May 1, 2021

== Standings ==
=== Conference ===
Western Conference
| # | Team | W | L | PCT | GB | GP |
|---|---|---|---|---|---|---|
| 1 | z – Utah Jazz * | 52 | 20 | .722 | – | 72 |
| 2 | y – Phoenix Suns * | 51 | 21 | .708 | 1.0 | 72 |
| 3 | x – Denver Nuggets | 47 | 25 | .653 | 5.0 | 72 |
| 4 | x – Los Angeles Clippers | 47 | 25 | .653 | 5.0 | 72 |
| 5 | y – Dallas Mavericks * | 42 | 30 | .583 | 10.0 | 72 |
| 6 | x – Portland Trail Blazers | 42 | 30 | .583 | 10.0 | 72 |
| 7 | x – Los Angeles Lakers | 42 | 30 | .583 | 10.0 | 72 |
| 8 | pi – Golden State Warriors | 39 | 33 | .542 | 13.0 | 72 |
| 9 | x – Memphis Grizzlies | 38 | 34 | .528 | 14.0 | 72 |
| 10 | pi – San Antonio Spurs | 33 | 39 | .458 | 19.0 | 72 |
| 11 | New Orleans Pelicans | 31 | 41 | .431 | 21.0 | 72 |
| 12 | Sacramento Kings | 31 | 41 | .431 | 21.0 | 72 |
| 13 | Minnesota Timberwolves | 23 | 49 | .319 | 29.0 | 72 |
| 14 | Oklahoma City Thunder | 22 | 50 | .306 | 30.0 | 72 |
| 15 | Houston Rockets | 17 | 55 | .236 | 35.0 | 72 |

Notes

- z – Clinched home court advantage for the entire playoffs
- c – Clinched home court advantage for the conference playoffs
- y – Clinched division title
- x – Clinched playoff spot
- pb – Clinched play-in spot
- o – Eliminated from playoff contention
- * – Division leader

== Game log ==
=== Preseason ===
2020 preseason game log
Total: 2–2 (Home: 1–1; Road: 1–1)
Preseason: 2–2 (home: 1–1; road: 1–1)

| Game | Date | Team | Score | High points | High rebounds | High assists | Location Attendance | Record |
|---|---|---|---|---|---|---|---|---|
| 1 | December 11 | @ Portland | L 102–127 | Buddy Hield (23) | Nemanja Bjelica (7) | De'Aaron Fox (6) | Moda Center | 0–1 |
| 2 | December 13 | @ Portland | W 121–106 | Guy, Holmes (14) | Haliburton, Robinson (6) | Tyrese Haliburton (7) | Moda Center | 1–1 |
| 3 | December 15 | Golden State | W 114–113 | Kyle Guy (20) | Hassan Whiteside (9) | De'Aaron Fox (5) | Golden 1 Center | 2–1 |
| 4 | December 17 | Golden State | L 105–113 | Harrison Barnes (17) | Hassan Whiteside (9) | De'Aaron Fox (12) | Golden 1 Center | 2–2 |

2020–21 season schedule

=== Regular season ===
2020–21 game log
Total: 31–41 (Home: 16–20; Road: 15–21)
December: 3–2 (home: 2–1; road: 1–1)

| Game | Date | Team | Score | High points | High rebounds | High assists | Location Attendance | Record |
|---|---|---|---|---|---|---|---|---|
| 1 | December 23 | @ Denver | W 124–122 | Buddy Hield (22) | Marvin Bagley III (10) | De'Aaron Fox (7) | Ball Arena; 0 | 1–0 |
| 2 | December 26 | Phoenix | W 106–103 | De'Aaron Fox (24) | Bagley III, Barnes (11) | De'Aaron Fox (5) | Golden 1 Center; 0 | 2–0 |
| 3 | December 27 | Phoenix | L 100–116 | Buddy Hield (17) | Richaun Holmes (11) | Tyrese Haliburton (6) | Golden 1 Center; 0 | 2–1 |
| 4 | December 29 | Denver | W 125–115 | De'Aaron Fox (24) | Buddy Hield (8) | De'Aaron Fox (3) | Golden 1 Center; 0 | 3–1 |
| 5 | December 31 | @ Houston | L 119–122 | Harrison Barnes (24) | Richaun Holmes (13) | De'Aaron Fox (6) | Toyota Center; 0 | 3–2 |

January: 5–9 (home: 2–5; road: 3–4)

| Game | Date | Team | Score | High points | High rebounds | High assists | Location Attendance | Record |
|---|---|---|---|---|---|---|---|---|
| 6 | January 2 | @ Houston | L 94–102 | De'Aaron Fox (23) | Bagley III, Holmes (9) | De'Aaron Fox (4) | Toyota Center; 0 | 3–3 |
| 7 | January 4 | @ Golden State | L 106–137 | Bagley III, Fox (18) | Bagley III, Barnes (9) | De'Aaron Fox (9) | Chase Center; 0 | 3–4 |
| 8 | January 6 | Chicago | W 128–124 | Richaun Holmes (24) | Marvin Bagley III (12) | Tyrese Haliburton (6) | Golden 1 Center; 0 | 4–4 |
| 9 | January 8 | Toronto | L 123–144 | De'Aaron Fox (23) | Buddy Hield (5) | Barnes, Haliburton (8) | Golden 1 Center; 0 | 4–5 |
| 10 | January 9 | Portland | L 99–125 | Marvin Bagley III (15) | Bagley III, Whiteside (8) | Tyrese Haliburton (8) | Golden 1 Center; 0 | 4–6 |
| 11 | January 11 | Indiana | W 127–122 | Harrison Barnes (30) | Richaun Holmes (10) | De'Aaron Fox (9) | Golden 1 Center; 0 | 5–6 |
| 12 | January 13 | Portland | L 126–132 | De'Aaron Fox (29) | Richaun Holmes (9) | Tyrese Haliburton (9) | Golden 1 Center; 0 | 5–7 |
| 13 | January 15 | L. A. Clippers | L 100–138 | Marvin Bagley III (20) | Chimezie Metu (8) | Haliburton, Hield (5) | Golden 1 Center; 0 | 5–8 |
| 14 | January 17 | New Orleans | L 123–128 | De'Aaron Fox (43) | Marvin Bagley III (10) | De'Aaron Fox (13) | Golden 1 Center; 0 | 5–9 |
| 15 | January 20 | @ L. A. Clippers | L 96–115 | De'Aaron Fox (25) | Marvin Bagley III (8) | De'Aaron Fox (7) | Staples Center; 0 | 5–10 |
| 16 | January 22 | New York | W 103–94 | De'Aaron Fox (22) | Richaun Holmes (14) | Barnes, Fox (7) | Golden 1 Center; 0 | 6–10 |
| – | January 24 | @ Memphis | Postponed (COVID-19) (Makeup date: May 13) | | | | | |
| – | January 25 | @ Memphis | Postponed (COVID-19) (Makeup date: May 14) | | | | | |
| 17 | January 27 | @ Orlando | W 121–107 | Harrison Barnes (21) | Bagley III, Holmes (12) | De'Aaron Fox (10) | Amway Center; Limited seating | 7–10 |
| 18 | January 29 | @ Toronto | W 126–124 | Harrison Barnes (26) | Harrison Barnes (7) | Tyrese Haliburton (11) | Amalie Arena; 0 | 8–10 |
| 19 | January 30 | @ Miami | L 104–105 | De'Aaron Fox (30) | Tyrese Haliburton (7) | Fox, Haliburton (6) | American Airlines Arena; Limited seating | 8–11 |

February: 5–10 (home: 2–6; road: 3–4)

| Game | Date | Team | Score | High points | High rebounds | High assists | Location Attendance | Record |
|---|---|---|---|---|---|---|---|---|
| 20 | February 1 | @ New Orleans | W 118–109 | De'Aaron Fox (38) | Tyrese Haliburton (11) | De'Aaron Fox (12) | Smoothie King Center; 1,440 | 9–11 |
| 21 | February 3 | Boston | W 116–111 | De'Aaron Fox (26) | Buddy Hield (10) | De'Aaron Fox (11) | Golden 1 Center; 0 | 10–11 |
| 22 | February 6 | Denver | W 119–114 | Harrison Barnes (28) | Hassan Whiteside (11) | Buddy Hield (7) | Golden 1 Center; 0 | 11–11 |
| 23 | February 7 | @ L. A. Clippers | W 113–110 | De'Aaron Fox (36) | Harrison Barnes (12) | De'Aaron Fox (7) | Staples Center; 0 | 12–11 |
| 24 | February 9 | Philadelphia | L 111–119 | De'Aaron Fox (34) | Harrison Barnes (7) | De'Aaron Fox (10) | Golden 1 Center; 0 | 12–12 |
| 25 | February 13 | Orlando | L 112–123 | Buddy Hield (19) | Nemanja Bjelica (9) | Tyrese Haliburton (7) | Golden 1 Center; 0 | 12–13 |
| 26 | February 14 | Memphis | L 110–124 | De'Aaron Fox (23) | Buddy Hield (6) | De'Aaron Fox (9) | Golden 1 Center; 0 | 12–14 |
| 27 | February 15 | Brooklyn | L 125–136 | Hassan Whiteside (26) | Hassan Whiteside (16) | De'Aaron Fox (8) | Golden 1 Center; 0 | 12–15 |
| 28 | February 18 | Miami | L 110–118 | Nemanja Bjelica (25) | Marvin Bagley III (10) | De'Aaron Fox (10) | Golden 1 Center; 0 | 12–16 |
| 29 | February 20 | @ Chicago | L 114–122 | Marvin Bagley III (26) | Marvin Bagley III (11) | De'Aaron Fox (9) | United Center; 0 | 12–17 |
| 30 | February 21 | @ Milwaukee | L 115–128 | Tyrese Haliburton (23) | Richaun Holmes (11) | De'Aaron Fox (10) | Fiserv Forum; 1,800 | 12–18 |
| 31 | February 23 | @ Brooklyn | L 118–127 | De'Aaron Fox (27) | Richaun Holmes (11) | Tyrese Haliburton (9) | Barclays Center; 324 | 12–19 |
| 32 | February 25 | @ New York | L 121–140 | De'Aaron Fox (29) | Harrison Barnes (7) | De'Aaron Fox (11) | Madison Square Garden; 1,981 | 12–20 |
| 33 | February 26 | @ Detroit | W 110–107 | De'Aaron Fox (27) | Richaun Holmes (17) | Harrison Barnes (7) | Little Caesars Arena; 0 | 13–20 |
| 34 | February 28 | Charlotte | L 126–127 | Harrison Barnes (28) | Marvin Bagley III (10) | De'Aaron Fox (14) | Golden 1 Center; 0 | 13–21 |

March: 9–5 (home: 5–0; road: 4–5)

| Game | Date | Team | Score | High points | High rebounds | High assists | Location Attendance | Record |
|---|---|---|---|---|---|---|---|---|
| 35 | March 3 | L. A. Lakers | W 123–120 | Buddy Hield (29) | Richaun Holmes (9) | De'Aaron Fox (8) | Golden 1 Center; 0 | 14–21 |
| 36 | March 4 | @ Portland | L 119–123 | De'Aaron Fox (32) | Richaun Holmes (11) | De'Aaron Fox (12) | Moda Center; 0 | 14–22 |
| 37 | March 11 | Houston | W 125–105 | De'Aaron Fox (30) | Barnes, Holmes (11) | De'Aaron Fox (9) | Golden 1 Center; 0 | 15–22 |
| 38 | March 13 | @ Atlanta | L 106–121 | De'Aaron Fox (32) | Richaun Holmes (12) | De'Aaron Fox (6) | State Farm Arena; 2,347 | 15–23 |
| 39 | March 15 | @ Charlotte | L 116–122 | De'Aaron Fox (29) | Richaun Holmes (15) | De'Aaron Fox (8) | Spectrum Center; 2,861 | 15–24 |
| 40 | March 17 | @ Washington | W 121–119 | De'Aaron Fox (28) | Harrison Barnes (8) | De'Aaron Fox (7) | Capital One Arena; 0 | 16–24 |
| 41 | March 19 | @ Boston | W 107–96 | De'Aaron Fox (29) | Richaun Holmes (11) | Tyrese Haliburton (7) | TD Garden; 0 | 17–24 |
| 42 | March 20 | @ Philadelphia | L 105–129 | Buddy Hield (25) | Harrison Barnes (7) | Cory Joseph (7) | Wells Fargo Center; 3,071 | 17–25 |
| 43 | March 22 | @ Cleveland | W 119–105 | De'Aaron Fox (30) | Richaun Holmes (16) | Harrison Barnes (8) | Rocket Mortgage FieldHouse; 4,100 | 18–25 |
| 44 | March 24 | Atlanta | W 110–108 | De'Aaron Fox (37) | Hassan Whiteside (12) | Tyrese Haliburton (7) | Golden 1 Center; 0 | 19–25 |
| 45 | March 25 | Golden State | W 141–119 | De'Aaron Fox (44) | Richaun Holmes (11) | De'Aaron Fox (7) | Golden 1 Center; 0 | 20–25 |
| 46 | March 27 | Cleveland | W 100–98 | De'Aaron Fox (36) | Richaun Holmes (14) | De'Aaron Fox (6) | Golden 1 Center; 0 | 21–25 |
| 47 | March 29 | @ San Antonio | W 132–115 | De'Aaron Fox (24) | Richaun Holmes (12) | Tyrese Haliburton (10) | AT&T Center; 2,876 | 22–25 |
| 48 | March 31 | @ San Antonio | L 106–120 | De'Aaron Fox (20) | Richaun Holmes (15) | Harrison Barnes (5) | AT&T Center; 2,802 | 22–26 |

April: 4–11 (home: 2–6; road: 2–5)

| Game | Date | Team | Score | High points | High rebounds | High assists | Location Attendance | Record |
|---|---|---|---|---|---|---|---|---|
| 49 | April 2 | L. A. Lakers | L 94–115 | Harrison Barnes (26) | Richaun Holmes (7) | Barnes, Fox (5) | Golden 1 Center; 0 | 22–27 |
| 50 | April 3 | Milwaukee | L 128–129 | Davis, Fox (27) | Richaun Holmes (9) | Tyrese Haliburton (11) | Golden 1 Center; 0 | 22–28 |
| 51 | April 5 | @ Minnesota | L 106–116 | De'Aaron Fox (31) | Harrison Barnes (12) | De'Aaron Fox (9) | Target Center; 1,436 | 22–29 |
| 52 | April 8 | Detroit | L 101–113 | De'Aaron Fox (23) | Fox, Holmes (9) | Fox, Haliburton (7) | Golden 1 Center; 0 | 22–30 |
| 53 | April 10 | @ Utah | L 112–128 | De'Aaron Fox (30) | Richaun Holmes (10) | De'Aaron Fox (8) | Vivint Arena; 5,546 | 22–31 |
| 54 | April 12 | @ New Orleans | L 110–117 | De'Aaron Fox (43) | Harrison Barnes (11) | Fox, Haliburton (6) | Smoothie King Center; 3,700 | 22–32 |
| 55 | April 14 | Washington | L 111–123 | De'Aaron Fox (33) | Harrison Barnes (7) | Fox, Haliburton (6) | Golden 1 Center; 0 | 22–33 |
| 56 | April 15 | @ Phoenix | L 114–122 | De'Aaron Fox (27) | Hassan Whiteside (10) | De'Aaron Fox (8) | Phoenix Suns Arena; 4,568 | 22–34 |
| 57 | April 18 | @ Dallas | W 121–107 | De'Aaron Fox (30) | Hassan Whiteside (10) | De'Aaron Fox (12) | American Airlines Center; 4,193 | 23–34 |
| 58 | April 20 | Minnesota | L 120–134 | Barnes, Harkless (20) | Harrison Barnes (8) | Tyrese Haliburton (9) | Golden 1 Center; 0 | 23–35 |
| 59 | April 21 | Minnesota | W 128–125 | De'Aaron Fox (30) | Damian Jones (8) | Barnes, Fox (7) | Golden 1 Center; 0 | 24–35 |
| 60 | April 25 | @ Golden State | L 113–117 | Buddy Hield (25) | Harrison Barnes (7) | Tyrese Haliburton (8) | Chase Center; 3,252 | 24–36 |
| 61 | April 26 | Dallas | W 113–106 | Richaun Holmes (24) | Damian Jones (7) | Tyrese Haliburton (10) | Golden 1 Center; 0 | 25–36 |
| 62 | April 28 | Utah | L 105–149 | Hield, Holmes (18) | Davis, Hield, Metu (5) | Tyrese Haliburton (8) | Golden 1 Center; 0 | 25–37 |
| 63 | April 30 | @ L. A. Lakers | W 110–106 | Tyrese Haliburton (23) | Richaun Holmes (9) | Tyrese Haliburton (10) | Staples Center; 2,691 | 26–37 |

May: 5–4 (home: 2–2; road: 3–2)

| Game | Date | Team | Score | High points | High rebounds | High assists | Location Attendance | Record |
|---|---|---|---|---|---|---|---|---|
| 64 | May 2 | @ Dallas | W 111–99 | Buddy Hield (27) | Marvin Bagley III (9) | Terence Davis (7) | American Airlines Center; 4,268 | 27–37 |
| 65 | May 4 | @ Oklahoma City | W 103–99 | Hield, Davis (18) | Buddy Hield (11) | Delon Wright (8) | Chesapeake Energy Arena; 0 | 28–37 |
| 66 | May 5 | @ Indiana | W 104–93 | Marvin Bagley III (31) | Marvin Bagley III (12) | Buddy Hield (8) | Bankers Life Fieldhouse; 0 | 29–37 |
| 67 | May 7 | San Antonio | L 104–113 | Terence Davis (24) | Damian Jones (6) | Jones, Wright (7) | Golden 1 Center; 0 | 29–38 |
| 68 | May 9 | Oklahoma City | W 126–98 | Davis, Harkless (18) | Bagley III, Metu (9) | Davis, Hield (7) | Golden 1 Center; 0 | 30–38 |
| 69 | May 11 | Oklahoma City | W 122–106 | Terence Davis (27) | Holmes, Jones (7) | Delon Wright (8) | Golden 1 Center; 0 | 31–38 |
| 70 | May 13 | @ Memphis | L 110–116 | Justin James (31) | Davis, Jones, Metu (5) | Delon Wright (8) | FedExForum; 2,876 | 31–39 |
| 71 | May 14 | @ Memphis | L 106–107 | Louis King (27) | Damian Jones (11) | Buddy Hield (5) | FedExForum; 3,502 | 31–40 |
| 72 | May 16 | Utah | L 99–121 | Damian Jones (19) | Chimezie Metu (8) | Buddy Hield (9) | Golden 1 Center; 0 | 31–41 |

2020–21 season schedule

== Player statistics ==
Legend
| GP | Games played | GS | Games started | MPG | Minutes per game |
| FG% | Field-goal percentage | 3P% | 3-point field-goal percentage | FT% | Free-throw percentage |
| RPG | Rebounds per game | APG | Assists per game | SPG | Steals per game |
| BPG | Blocks per game | PPG | Points per game |

=== Regular season ===
| Player | GP | GS | MPG | FG% | 3P% | FT% | RPG | APG | SPG | BPG | PPG |
|---|---|---|---|---|---|---|---|---|---|---|---|
| Buddy Hield | 71 | 71 | 34.3 | .406 | .391 | .846 | 4.7 | 3.6 | .9 | .4 | 16.6 |
| Richaun Holmes | 61 | 61 | 29.2 | .637 | .182 | .794 | 8.3 | 1.7 | .6 | 1.6 | 14.2 |
| Harrison Barnes | 58 | 58 | 36.2 | .497 | .391 | .830 | 6.6 | 3.5 | .7 | .2 | 16.1 |
| De'Aaron Fox | 58 | 58 | 35.1 | .477 | .322 | .719 | 3.5 | 7.2 | 1.5 | .5 | 25.2 |
| Tyrese Haliburton | 58 | 20 | 30.1 | .472 | .409 | .857 | 3.0 | 5.3 | 1.3 | .5 | 13.0 |
| Cory Joseph^{†} | 44 | 2 | 21.5 | .444 | .330 | .766 | 2.3 | 2.5 | .9 | .2 | 6.6 |
| Marvin Bagley III | 43 | 42 | 25.9 | .504 | .343 | .575 | 7.4 | 1.0 | .5 | .5 | 14.1 |
| Chimezie Metu | 36 | 6 | 13.6 | .508 | .351 | .721 | 3.1 | .8 | .4 | .5 | 6.3 |
| Hassan Whiteside | 36 | 4 | 15.2 | .563 | .000 | .519 | 6.0 | .6 | .3 | 1.3 | 8.1 |
| Justin James | 36 | 0 | 8.6 | .468 | .368 | .583 | .8 | .6 | .2 | .1 | 3.9 |
| Kyle Guy | 31 | 0 | 7.6 | .330 | .283 | .800 | 1.1 | 1.0 | .2 | .0 | 2.8 |
| Delon Wright^{†} | 27 | 8 | 25.8 | .462 | .398 | .833 | 3.9 | 3.6 | 1.6 | .4 | 10.0 |
| Terence Davis^{†} | 27 | 0 | 21.5 | .439 | .372 | .784 | 3.3 | 1.7 | 1.0 | .3 | 11.1 |
| Maurice Harkless^{†} | 26 | 20 | 24.9 | .421 | .247 | .805 | 2.9 | 1.4 | 1.1 | .6 | 6.9 |
| Nemanja Bjelica^{†} | 26 | 1 | 16.9 | .460 | .293 | .762 | 3.8 | 1.9 | .3 | .1 | 7.2 |
| Glenn Robinson III | 23 | 2 | 16.0 | .424 | .364 | .913 | 2.0 | .9 | .2 | .1 | 5.3 |
| DaQuan Jeffries^{†} | 18 | 2 | 12.9 | .421 | .321 | .857 | 1.6 | .3 | .4 | .2 | 3.5 |
| Damian Jones^{†} | 17 | 4 | 20.1 | .657 | .250 | .714 | 4.5 | 1.4 | .5 | 1.0 | 6.9 |
| Jahmi'us Ramsey | 13 | 0 | 7.2 | .395 | .263 | 1.000 | .8 | .5 | .3 | .1 | 3.1 |
| Robert Woodard II | 13 | 0 | 3.5 | .400 | .167 | .375 | 1.2 | .2 | .0 | .2 | 1.5 |
| Louis King | 6 | 1 | 14.2 | .500 | .364 | 1.000 | 3.0 | 1.5 | 1.2 | .5 | 7.3 |
| Chris Silva^{†} | 4 | 0 | 2.3 | .333 | | | .5 | .0 | .0 | .3 | .5 |
| Jabari Parker^{†} | 3 | 0 | 9.0 | .571 | .000 | | 2.0 | .3 | .0 | .3 | 2.7 |
| Norvel Pelle^{†} | 1 | 0 | 4.0 | .000 | | .750 | 1.0 | 1.0 | .0 | .0 | 3.0 |

- ^{†} Denotes player spent time with another team in the season. Stats reflect time with the Kings only.

== Transactions ==
=== Trades ===
| November 19, 2020 | To Sacramento Kings Draft rights to Robert Woodard II (#40); 2022 second-round pick | To Memphis Grizzlies Draft rights to Xavier Tillman (#35) |
| November 25, 2020 | To Sacramento Kings 2021 LAL second-round pick cash considerations | To Houston Rockets Draft rights to Kenyon Martin Jr. (#52) |
| March 25, 2021 | To Sacramento Kings Terence Davis | To Toronto Raptors 2021 MEM second-round pick |
| March 25, 2021 | To Sacramento Kings Maurice Harkless Chris Silva | To Miami Heat Nemanja Bjelica |

=== Free agency ===
==== Re-signed ====
| Player | Signed |
|---|---|
| DaQuan Jeffries | November 28 |

==== Additions ====
| Player | Signed | Former team |
|---|---|---|
| Hassan Whiteside | November 27 | Portland Trail Blazers |
| Chimezie Metu | November 28 (Exhibit 10) | San Antonio Spurs |
| Frank Kaminsky | November 30 | Phoenix Suns |
| Glenn Robinson III | December 2 | Philadelphia 76ers |
| Norvel Pelle | February 25 (10-day contract) | Brooklyn Nets |
| Damian Jones | April 7 | Los Angeles Lakers |
| Louis King | May 1 | New York Knicks |

==== Subtractions ====
| Player | Reason left | New team |
|---|---|---|
| Harry Giles | Free Agency | Portland Trail Blazers |
| Bogdan Bogdanović | Free Agency | Atlanta Hawks |
| Alex Len | Free Agency | Toronto Raptors |
| Kent Bazemore | Free Agency | Golden State Warriors |
| Norvel Pelle | 10-day contract expired | New York Knicks |
| Nemanja Bjelica | Trade | Miami Heat |
| DaQuan Jeffries | Waived | Houston Rockets |
| Chris Silva | Waived | |
