= 2020–21 Minnesota Timberwolves season =

NBA professional basketball team season

- Head coach: Ryan Saunders (fired); Chris Finch
- General manager: Vacant
- Owner: Glen Taylor
- Arena: Target Center

Results
- Record: 23–49 (.319)
- Place: Division: 4th (Northwest); Conference: 13th (Western)
- Playoff finish: Did not qualify
- Stats at Basketball Reference

Local media
- Television: Bally Sports North
- Radio: WCCO

The 2020–21 Minnesota Timberwolves season was the 32nd season of the franchise in the National Basketball Association (NBA) On February 21, 2021, the Timberwolves fired head coach Ryan Saunders after three seasons with the team. On the following day, Toronto Raptors assistant head coach Chris Finch was announced as the next head coach. After a loss to the Sacramento Kings on April 21, followed by the San Antonio Spurs defeating the Detroit Pistons the next day, the Timberwolves were eliminated from playoff contention for the third straight year.

== Draft ==
Round	Pick	Player	Position	Nationality	School / club team
1	1	Anthony Edwards	Guard	United States	Georgia
1	17	Aleksej Pokuševski	Forward	Serbia	Olympiacos
2	33	Daniel Oturu	Center	United States	Minnesota

Before the start of the 2020 NBA draft period, the Timberwolves' selection was held stuck as the #3 selection of the draft with their record being the third-worst of all NBA teams the prior season at 19–45 before the NBA suspended their season on March 12, 2020, and cancelled the rest of Minnesota's season by June 5. As a result, they held the best odds to move up at #1 alongside the Cleveland Cavaliers and Golden State Warriors for the 2020 draft, though also held odds to fall as low as the #6 pick of the draft. This year, the Timberwolves ended the 2020 NBA draft lottery with the #1 selection, moving up two spots from their initial projection. In addition to their first-round pick, the Timberwolves also held their second-round pick and gained a first-round picks from a previous trade involving the Brooklyn Nets. They traded the Number 17 pick and James Johnson for Ricky Rubio, the number 25 and 28 overall picks. They then traded the number 25 and 33 overall picks for the 23rd overall pick.

== Roster ==
2020–21 Minnesota Timberwolves roster
Players

Pos.	No.	Player	Height	Weight	DOB	From
G	5	Malik Beasley	6 ft 4 in (1.93 m)	187 lb (85 kg)	1996-11-26	Florida State
G/F	23	Jarrett Culver	6 ft 6 in (1.98 m)	195 lb (88 kg)	1999-02-20	Texas Tech
F/C	17	Ed Davis	6 ft 10 in (2.08 m)	220 lb (100 kg)	1989-06-05	North Carolina
G	1	Anthony Edwards	6 ft 4 in (1.93 m)	225 lb (102 kg)	2001-08-05	Georgia
F	41	Juan Hernangómez	6 ft 9 in (2.06 m)	214 lb (97 kg)	1995-09-28	Spain
F	10	Jake Layman	6 ft 9 in (2.06 m)	209 lb (95 kg)	1994-03-07	Maryland
F	3	Jaden McDaniels	6 ft 9 in (2.06 m)	185 lb (84 kg)	2000-09-29	Washington
G	6	Jordan McLaughlin (TW)	5 ft 11 in (1.80 m)	185 lb (84 kg)	1996–04–09	USC
G	4	Jaylen Nowell	6 ft 4 in (1.93 m)	201 lb (91 kg)	1999-07-09	Washington
G	20	Josh Okogie	6 ft 4 in (1.93 m)	213 lb (97 kg)	1998-09-01	Georgia Tech
C	11	Naz Reid	6 ft 10 in (2.08 m)	264 lb (120 kg)	1999-08-26	LSU
G	9	Ricky Rubio	6 ft 3 in (1.91 m)	190 lb (86 kg)	1990-10-21	Spain
G	0	D'Angelo Russell (injured)	6 ft 4 in (1.93 m)	193 lb (88 kg)	1996-02-23	Ohio State
C	32	Karl-Anthony Towns	7 ft 0 in (2.13 m)	248 lb (112 kg)	1995-11-15	Kentucky
F	8	Jarred Vanderbilt	6 ft 9 in (2.06 m)	214 lb (97 kg)	1999-04-03	Kentucky

Coaches
Head coach
- Chris Finch
Assistant(s)
- Joseph Blair
- Kevin Burleson
- Bryan Gates
- Kevin Hanson
- Pablo Prigioni
- David Vanterpool (Associate HC)

Legend
- (DP) Unsigned draft pick
- (FA) Free agent
- (S) Suspended
- (GL) On assignment to G League affiliate
- (TW) Two-way affiliate player
- Injured

Roster
Updated: February 22, 2021

== Standings ==
=== Division ===
Northwest Division	W	L	PCT	GB	Home	Road	Div	GP
z – Utah Jazz	52	20	.722	–	31‍–‍5	21‍–‍15	7–5	72
x – Denver Nuggets	47	25	.653	5.0	25‍–‍11	22‍–‍14	9–3	72
x – Portland Trail Blazers	42	30	.583	10.0	20‍–‍16	22‍–‍14	6–6	72
Minnesota Timberwolves	23	49	.319	29.0	13‍–‍23	10‍–‍26	5–7	72
Oklahoma City Thunder	22	50	.306	30.0	10‍–‍26	12‍–‍24	3–9	72

=== Conference ===
Western Conference
#	Team	W	L	PCT	GB	GP
1	z – Utah Jazz *	52	20	.722	–	72
2	y – Phoenix Suns *	51	21	.708	1.0	72
3	x – Denver Nuggets	47	25	.653	5.0	72
4	x – Los Angeles Clippers	47	25	.653	5.0	72
5	y – Dallas Mavericks *	42	30	.583	10.0	72
6	x – Portland Trail Blazers	42	30	.583	10.0	72
7	x – Los Angeles Lakers	42	30	.583	10.0	72
8	pi – Golden State Warriors	39	33	.542	13.0	72
9	x – Memphis Grizzlies	38	34	.528	14.0	72
10	pi – San Antonio Spurs	33	39	.458	19.0	72
11	New Orleans Pelicans	31	41	.431	21.0	72
12	Sacramento Kings	31	41	.431	21.0	72
13	Minnesota Timberwolves	23	49	.319	29.0	72
14	Oklahoma City Thunder	22	50	.306	30.0	72
15	Houston Rockets	17	55	.236	35.0	72

Notes

- z – Clinched home court advantage for the entire playoffs
- c – Clinched home court advantage for the conference playoffs
- y – Clinched division title
- x – Clinched playoff spot
- pb – Clinched play-in spot
- o – Eliminated from playoff contention
- * – Division leader

== Game log ==
=== Preseason ===
2020 preseason game log
Total: 1–2 (Home: 0–2; Road: 1–0)
Preseason: 1–2 (home: 0–2; road: 1–0)

Game	Date	Team	Score	High points	High rebounds	High assists	Location Attendance	Record
1	December 12	Memphis	L 105–107	Jaylen Nowell (22)	Karl-Anthony Towns (8)	Malik Beasley (3)	Target Center; 0	0–1
2	December 14	Memphis	L 104–123	D'Angelo Russell (19)	Karl-Anthony Towns (9)	Karl-Anthony Towns (5)	Target Center; 0	0–2
3	December 17	@ Dallas	W 129–127	Karl-Anthony Towns (20)	Malik Beasley (11)	Ricky Rubio (4)	American Airlines Center; 0	1–2

2020–21 season schedule

=== Regular season ===
2020–21 game log
Total: 23–49 (Home: 13–23; Road: 10–26)
December: 2–2 (home: 1–0; road: 1–2)

Game	Date	Team	Score	High points	High rebounds	High assists	Location Attendance	Record
1	December 23	Detroit	W 111–101	Malik Beasley (23)	Karl-Anthony Towns (11)	Karl-Anthony Towns (7)	Target Center; 0	1–0
2	December 26	@ Utah	W 116–111	D'Angelo Russell (25)	Karl-Anthony Towns (12)	D'Angelo Russell (6)	Vivint Smart Home Arena; 0	2–0
3	December 27	@ L. A. Lakers	L 91–127	Anthony Edwards (15)	Jarred Vanderbilt (7)	Jarred Vanderbilt (6)	Staples Center; 0	2–1
4	December 29	@ L. A. Clippers	L 101–124	D'Angelo Russell (22)	Jarrett Culver (10)	Jordan McLaughlin (9)	Staples Center; 0	2–2

January: 3–12 (home: 3–7; road: 0–5)

Game	Date	Team	Score	High points	High rebounds	High assists	Location Attendance	Record
5	January 1	Washington	L 109–130	Malik Beasley (21)	Ed Davis (10)	Ricky Rubio (5)	Target Center; 0	2–3
6	January 3	Denver	L 109–124	Malik Beasley (25)	Ed Davis (8)	D'Angelo Russell (7)	Target Center; 0	2–4
7	January 5	@ Denver	L 116–123	D'Angelo Russell (33)	Willy Hernangómez (8)	D'Angelo Russell (11)	Ball Arena; 0	2–5
8	January 7	@ Portland	L 117–135	Anthony Edwards (26)	Jarred Vanderbilt (10)	Ricky Rubio (10)	Moda Center; 0	2–6
9	January 9	San Antonio	L 122–125 (OT)	Malik Beasley (29)	Karl-Anthony Towns (13)	Ricky Rubio (8)	Target Center; 0	2–7
10	January 10	San Antonio	W 96–88	D'Angelo Russell (27)	Willy Hernangómez (8)	Ricky Rubio (6)	Target Center; 0	3–7
11	January 13	Memphis	L 107–118	Malik Beasley (28)	Karl-Anthony Towns (14)	D'Angelo Russell (8)	Target Center; 0	3–8
–	January 15	Memphis	Postponed (COVID-19) (Makeup date: May 5)					
12	January 18	@ Atlanta	L 97–108	D'Angelo Russell (31)	Jarred Vanderbilt (8)	D'Angelo Russell (7)	State Farm Arena; 0	3–9
13	January 20	Orlando	L 96–97	D'Angelo Russell (19)	Jaden McDaniels (8)	Jordan McLaughlin (7)	Target Center; 0	3–10
14	January 22	Atlanta	L 98–116	Malik Beasley (17)	Naz Reid (8)	McLaughlin, Rubio (5)	Target Center	3–11
15	January 23	New Orleans	W 120–110	Naz Reid (20)	Jarred Vanderbilt (11)	Ricky Rubio (7)	Target Center; 0	4–11
16	January 25	@ Golden State	L 108–130	Malik Beasley (30)	Naz Reid (10)	Ricky Rubio (11)	Chase Center; 0	4–12
17	January 27	@ Golden State	L 111–123	Beasley, Edwards (25)	Vanderbilt, Reid (7)	Rubio, McLaughlin (5)	Chase Center; 0	4–13
18	January 29	Philadelphia	L 94–118	Malik Beasley (22)	Ed Davis (8)	Ricky Rubio (5)	Target Center; 0	4–14
19	January 31	Cleveland	W 109–104	Edwards, Beasley (23)	Jarred Vanderbilt (8)	Ricky Rubio (8)	Target Center; 0	5–14

February: 2–14 (home: 0–5; road: 2–9)

Game	Date	Team	Score	High points	High rebounds	High assists	Location Attendance	Record
20	February 1	@ Cleveland	L 98–100	D'Angelo Russell (18)	Jarred Vanderbilt (9)	3 players (4)	Rocket Mortgage FieldHouse; 0	5–15
21	February 3	@ San Antonio	L 108–111	Malik Beasley (29)	Reid, Vanderbilt (11)	Ricky Rubio (7)	AT&T Center; 0	5–16
22	February 5	@ Oklahoma City	W 106–103	Malik Beasley (24)	Reid, Vanderbilt (9)	Ricky Rubio (8)	Chesapeake Energy Arena; 0	6–16
23	February 6	@ Oklahoma City	L 118–120	Naz Reid (29)	Anthony Edwards (8)	Rubio, McLaughlin (6)	Chsesapeake Energy Arena; 0	6–17
24	February 8	@ Dallas	L 122–127	Malik Beasley (30)	Malik Beasley (9)	Ricky Rubio (7)	American Airlines Center; 1,000	6–18
25	February 10	L. A. Clippers	L 112–119	Naz Reid (23)	Karl-Anthony Towns (10)	Ricky Rubio (10)	Target Center; 0	6–19
26	February 12	@ Charlotte	L 114–120	Malik Beasley (31)	Karl-Anthony Towns (8)	Ricky Rubio (9)	Spectrum Center; 0	6–20
27	February 14	@ Toronto	W 116–112	Towns, Beasley (20)	Karl-Anthony Towns (11)	Malik Beasley (6)	Amalie Arena; 0	7–20
28	February 16	L. A. Lakers	L 104–112	Anthony Edwards (28)	Jarred Vanderbilt (13)	Ricky Rubio (8)	Target Center; 0	7–21
29	February 17	Indiana	L 128–134 (OT)	Karl-Anthony Towns (30)	Karl-Anthony Towns (10)	Ricky Rubio (13)	Target Center; 0	7–22
30	February 19	Toronto	L 81–86	Karl-Anthony Towns (19)	Karl-Anthony Towns (13)	Jordan McLaughlin (7)	Target Center; 0	7–23
31	February 21	@ New York	L 99–103	Karl-Anthony Towns (27)	Karl-Anthony Towns (15)	Ricky Rubio (6)	Madison Square Garden; 0	7–24
32	February 23	@ Milwaukee	L 112–139	Towns, Beasley (26)	Karl-Anthony Towns (8)	Karl-Anthony Towns (8)	Fiserv Forum; 1,800	7–25
33	February 24	@ Chicago	L 126–133 (OT)	Malik Beasley (25)	Anthony Edwards (9)	Ricky Rubio (10)	United Center; 0	7–26
34	February 27	@ Washington	L 112–128	Karl-Anthony Towns (23)	Jarred Vanderbilt (12)	Karl-Anthony Towns (5)	Capital One Arena; 0	7–27
35	February 28	Phoenix	L 99–118	Anthony Edwards (24)	Karl-Anthony Towns (10)	Ricky Rubio (6)	Target Center; 0	7–28

March: 5–8 (home: 3–5; road: 2–3)

Game	Date	Team	Score	High points	High rebounds	High assists	Location Attendance	Record
36	March 3	Charlotte	L 102–135	Ricky Rubio (20)	Karl-Anthony Towns (15)	Ricky Rubio (9)	Target Center; 0	7–29
37	March 11	@ New Orleans	W 135–105	Jaylen Nowell (28)	Karl-Anthony Towns (7)	Ricky Rubio (8)	Smoothie King Center; 3,700	8–29
38	March 13	Portland	L 121–125	Karl-Anthony Towns (34)	Karl-Anthony Towns (10)	Ricky Rubio (8)	Target Center; 0	8–30
39	March 14	Portland	W 114–112	Anthony Edwards (34)	Karl-Anthony Towns (8)	Karl-Anthony Towns (8)	Target Center; 0	9–30
40	March 16	@ L. A. Lakers	L 121–137	Towns, Edwards (29)	Karl-Anthony Towns (6)	Ricky Rubio (12)	Staples Center; 0	9–31
41	March 18	@ Phoenix	W 123–119	Anthony Edwards (42)	Karl-Anthony Towns (10)	Karl-Anthony Towns (8)	Phoenix Suns Arena; 3,172	10–31
42	March 19	@ Phoenix	L 101–113	Karl-Anthony Towns (24)	Anthony Edwards (10)	Ricky Rubio (10)	Phoenix Suns Arena; 3,124	10–32
43	March 22	Oklahoma City	L 103–112	Karl-Anthony Towns (33)	Karl-Anthony Towns (10)	Ricky Rubio (11)	Target Center; 0	10–33
44	March 24	Dallas	L 108–128	Anthony Edwards (29)	Naz Reid (6)	Ricky Rubio (7)	Target Center; 0	10–34
45	March 26	Houston	W 107–101	Karl-Anthony Towns (29)	Karl-Anthony Towns (16)	Rubio, Towns (8)	Target Center; 0	11–34
46	March 27	Houston	L 107–129	Edwards, Towns (27)	Karl-Anthony Towns (15)	Ricky Rubio (10)	Target Center; 0	11–35
47	March 29	@ Brooklyn	L 107–112	Karl-Anthony Towns (31)	Karl-Anthony Towns (12)	Karl-Anthony Towns (5)	Barclays Center; 1,732	11–36
48	March 31	New York	W 102–101	Anthony Edwards (24)	Karl-Anthony Towns (17)	Ricky Rubio (7)	Target Center; 0	12–36

April: 8–8 (home: 5–2; road: 3–6)

Game	Date	Team	Score	High points	High rebounds	High assists	Location Attendance	Record
49	April 2	@ Memphis	L 108–120	Karl-Anthony Towns (30)	Karl-Anthony Towns (16)	Anthony Edwards (6)	Target Center; 0	12–37
50	April 3	@ Philadelphia	L 113–122	Karl-Anthony Towns (39)	Karl-Anthony Towns (14)	Jordan McLaughlin (9)	Wells Fargo Center; 3,071	12–38
51	April 5	Sacramento	W 116–106	D'Angelo Russell (25)	Karl-Anthony Towns (13)	Edwards, Rubio, Towns (5)	Target Center; 1,436	13–38
52	April 7	@ Indiana	L 137–141	Karl-Anthony Towns (32)	Karl-Anthony Towns (12)	Ricky Rubio (7)	Bankers Life Fieldhouse; Limited seating	13–39
53	April 9	@ Boston	L 136–145 (OT)	Karl-Anthony Towns (30)	Karl-Anthony Towns (12)	D'Angelo Russell (8)	TD Garden; 2,298	13–40
54	April 11	Chicago	W 121–117	Russell, Towns (27)	Karl-Anthony Towns (12)	Ricky Rubio (9)	Target Center; 1,436	14–40
—	April 12	Brooklyn	Postponed (Killing of Daunte Wright) (Makeup date: April 13)					
55	April 13	Brooklyn	L 97–127	Anthony Edwards (27)	Anthony Edwards (8)	Jarred Vanderbilt (3)	Target Center; 0	14–41
56	April 14	Milwaukee	L 105–130	Anthony Edwards (24)	Naz Reid (15)	D'Angelo Russell (6)	Target Center; 0	14–42
57	April 16	Miami	W 119–111	Karl-Anthony Towns (24)	Naz Reid (7)	Edwards, Towns, Russell (5)	Target Center; 1,638	15–42
58	April 18	@ L. A. Clippers	L 105–124	Anthony Edwards (23)	Naz Reid (7)	Rubio, Towns (5)	Staples Center; 1,734	15–43
59	April 20	@ Sacramento	W 134–120	Edwards, Russell (28)	Karl-Anthony Towns (18)	Ricky Rubio (11)	Golden 1 Center; 0	16–43
60	April 21	@ Sacramento	L 125–128	Karl-Anthony Towns (26)	Naz Reid (7)	D'Angelo Russell (9)	Golden 1 Center; 0	16–44
61	April 24	@ Utah	W 101–96	Karl-Anthony Towns (24)	Karl-Anthony Towns (12)	Anthony Edwards (4)	Vivint Arena; 5,546	17–44
62	April 26	Utah	W 105–104	Karl-Anthony Towns (21)	Karl-Anthony Towns (11)	D'Angelo Russell (12)	Target Center; 1,638	18–44
63	April 27	@ Houston	W 114–107	Karl-Anthony Towns (31)	Anthony Edwards (9)	D'Angelo Russell (7)	Toyota Center; 3,225	19–44
64	April 29	Golden State	W 126–114	Ricky Rubio (26)	Karl-Anthony Towns (11)	D'Angelo Russell (8)	Target Center; 1,638	20–44

May: 3–5 (home: 1–4; road: 2–1)

Game	Date	Team	Score	High points	High rebounds	High assists	Location Attendance	Record
65	May 1	@ New Orleans	L 136–140	Anthony Edwards (29)	Karl-Anthony Towns (14)	D'Angelo Russell (11)	Target Center; 1,638	20–45
66	May 5	Memphis	L 135–139	Anthony Edwards (42)	Naz Reid (7)	D'Angelo Russell (14)	Target Center; 1,436	20–46
67	May 7	@ Miami	L 112–121	Karl-Anthony Towns (27)	Jarred Vanderbilt (11)	Ricky Rubio (9)	American Airlines Arena; Limited seating	20–47
68	May 9	@ Orlando	W 128–96	Russell, Towns (27)	Anthony Edwards (10)	D'Angelo Russell (7)	Amway Center; 4,086	21–47
69	May 11	@ Detroit	W 119–100	Karl-Anthony Towns (28)	Towns, Vanderbilt (8)	D'Angelo Russell (10)	Little Caesars Arena; 750	22–47
70	May 13	Denver	L 103–114	Anthony Edwards (29)	Karl-Anthony Towns (11)	Edwards, Rubio (5)	Target Center; 1,638	22–48
71	May 15	Boston	L 108–124	Karl-Anthony Towns (24)	Karl-Anthony Towns (14)	Edwards, Russell (6)	Target Center; 1,638	22–49
72	May 16	Dallas	W 136–121	Anthony Edwards (30)	Jarred Vanderbilt (12)	D'Angelo Russell (10)	Target Center; 1,638	23–49

2020–21 season schedule

== Player statistics ==
=== Regular season ===
Player	POS	GP	GS	MP	REB	AST	STL	BLK	PTS	MPG	RPG	APG	SPG	BPG	PPG
Anthony Edwards	SG	72	55	2,314	336	211	82	36	1,392	32.1	4.7	2.9	1.1	.5	19.3
Naz Reid	C	70	15	1,347	322	72	34	76	784	19.2	4.6	1.0	.5	1.1	11.2
Ricky Rubio	PG	68	51	1,772	223	433	98	4	582	26.1	3.3	6.4	1.4	.1	8.6
Jarred Vanderbilt	PF	64	30	1,139	368	76	64	46	344	17.8	5.8	1.2	1.0	.7	5.4
Jaden McDaniels	PF	63	27	1,511	232	71	35	60	427	24.0	3.7	1.1	.6	1.0	6.8
Josh Okogie	SG	59	37	1,197	156	63	54	28	316	20.3	2.6	1.1	.9	.5	5.4
Juancho Hernangómez	PF	52	6	900	205	35	19	7	375	17.3	3.9	.7	.4	.1	7.2
Jordan McLaughlin	PG	51	2	938	108	193	51	6	256	18.4	2.1	3.8	1.0	.1	5.0
Karl-Anthony Towns	C	50	50	1,689	529	225	39	57	1,239	33.8	10.6	4.5	.8	1.1	24.8
Jake Layman	SF	45	11	627	67	28	29	19	231	13.9	1.5	.6	.6	.4	5.1
D'Angelo Russell	PG	42	26	1,196	111	244	45	18	796	28.5	2.6	5.8	1.1	.4	19.0
Jaylen Nowell	SG	42	0	759	95	62	22	12	379	18.1	2.3	1.5	.5	.3	9.0
Malik Beasley	SG	37	36	1,214	162	88	30	7	724	32.8	4.4	2.4	.8	.2	19.6
Jarrett Culver	SG	34	7	499	104	24	17	9	180	14.7	3.1	.7	.5	.3	5.3
Ed Davis	C	23	7	299	115	21	13	13	48	13.0	5.0	.9	.6	.6	2.1
Ashton Hagans	PG	2	0	4	0	0	0	0	0	2.0	.0	.0	.0	.0	.0

== Transactions ==
=== Trades ===
November 19, 2020	To Minnesota Timberwolves Draft rights to Mathias Lessort; 2023 second-round pick	To Los Angeles Clippers Draft rights to Daniel Oturu
November 20, 2020 (Three-team trade)	To Minnesota Timberwolves Draft rights to Jaden McDaniels; Ricky Rubio	To Oklahoma City Thunder Draft rights to Aleksej Pokuševski; James Johnson; 2024 second-round pick
November 20, 2020 (Three-team trade)	To New York Knicks Draft rights to Immanuel Quickley	
November 19, 2020	To Minnesota Timberwolves Ed Davis	To New York Knicks Jacob Evans; Omari Spellman; 2026 second-round pick

=== Free agency ===
==== Re-signed ====
Player	Signed	Ref.
Malik Beasley	4-year contract worth $60 million (November 25, 2020)	
Juancho Hernangómez	2-year contract worth $21 million (November 27, 2020)	
Jordan McLaughlin	Two-way contract (December 17, 2020)	

==== Additions ====
Player	Signed	Former team	Ref.
Ashton Hagans	Two-way contract (November 19, 2020)	Kentucky Wildcats	
Tyler Cook	Exhibit 10 contract (November 29, 2020)	Denver Nuggets	
Ade Murkey	Exhibit 10 contract (December 2, 2020)	Denver Pioneers	
Rondae Hollis-Jefferson	Exhibit 10 contract (December 3, 2020)	Toronto Raptors	
Charlie Brown Jr.	Exhibit 10 contract (December 10, 2020)	Atlanta Hawks	
Zylan Cheatham	Exhibit 10 contract (December 18, 2020)	Oklahoma City Thunder	

==== Subtractions ====
Player	Reason left	New team	Ref.
Ade Murkey	Waived (December 18, 2020)	Iowa Wolves	
Zylan Cheatham	Waived (December 19, 2020)	Iowa Wolves	
Charlie Brown Jr.	Waived (December 19, 2020)	Iowa Wolves	
Tyler Cook	Waived (December 19, 2020)	Iowa Wolves	
Rondae Hollis-Jefferson	Waived (December 19, 2020)	Portland Trail Blazers	
Ashton Hagans	Waived (February 13, 2021)	—	
