= 2020–21 New Orleans Pelicans season =

- Head coach: Stan Van Gundy
- General manager: Trajan Langdon
- Owner: Gayle Benson
- Arena: Smoothie King Center

Results
- Record: 31–41 (.431)
- Place: Division: 4th (Southwest); Conference: 11th (Western)
- Playoff finish: Did not qualify
- Stats at Basketball Reference

Local media
- Television: Bally Sports New Orleans
- Radio: WWL-FM

The 2020–21 New Orleans Pelicans season was the 19th season of the New Orleans Pelicans franchise in the National Basketball Association (NBA). On August 15, 2020, the New Orleans Pelicans fired head coach Alvin Gentry after five seasons with the team. On October 22, 2020, the Pelicans hired Stan Van Gundy as their new head coach, who was also fired on June 16, 2021, after just one season with the team. The Pelicans failed to qualify for the postseason for the third consecutive season following a loss to the Dallas Mavericks on May 12, 2021.

Following the season, the Pelicans and head coach Stan Van Gundy mutually agreed to part ways.

== Draft ==
Round	Pick	Player	Position	Nationality	College / Club
1	13	Kira Lewis Jr.	PG	United States	Alabama
2	39	Elijah Hughes	SF	United States	Syracuse
2	42	Nick Richards	C	Jamaica	Kentucky
2	60	Sam Merrill	SG	United States	Utah State

After their March 11, 2020 game against the Sacramento Kings was postponed due to COVID-19 concerns with a referee, the Pelicans and Kings were stuck with a tied record for the best odds at the #12 pick of the 2020 NBA draft during the Suspension of the 2019–20 NBA season. However, as one of the teams invited to the 2020 NBA Bubble, it gave them a chance to move their selection up with a potential playoff spot earned there. Due to poor performances in the bubble, the Pelicans failed to gain any ground there. Even worse, despite gaining an extra loss, their first-round pick moved to #13 instead due to the Kings winning their tiebreaker via March 11 records. The Pelicans also held three second-round picks, with two of the three picks acquired via a three-way trade involving the Milwaukee Bucks and Detroit Pistons.

== Roster ==
2020–21 New Orleans Pelicans roster
Players

Pos.	No.	Player	Height	Weight	DOB	From
C	12	Steven Adams	6 ft 11 in (2.11 m)	265 lb (120 kg)	1993-07-20	Pittsburgh
G	6	Nickeil Alexander-Walker	6 ft 6 in (1.98 m)	205 lb (93 kg)	1998-09-02	Virginia Tech
G	2	Lonzo Ball	6 ft 6 in (1.98 m)	190 lb (86 kg)	1997-10-27	UCLA
G	5	Eric Bledsoe	6 ft 1 in (1.85 m)	214 lb (97 kg)	1989-12-09	Kentucky
F	32	Wenyen Gabriel	6 ft 9 in (2.06 m)	205 lb (93 kg)	1997-03-26	Kentucky
G/F	3	Josh Hart	6 ft 5 in (1.96 m)	215 lb (98 kg)	1995-03-06	Villanova
F/C	10	Jaxson Hayes	7 ft 0 in (2.13 m)	220 lb (100 kg)	2000-05-23	Texas
C	9	Willy Hernangómez	6 ft 11 in (2.11 m)	250 lb (113 kg)	1994-05-27	Spain
F	14	Brandon Ingram	6 ft 9 in (2.06 m)	190 lb (86 kg)	1997-09-02	Duke
G	4	Wes Iwundu	6 ft 7 in (2.01 m)	195 lb (88 kg)	1994-12-20	Kansas State
F	16	James Johnson	6 ft 7 in (2.01 m)	240 lb (109 kg)	1987-02-20	Wake Forest
G	13	Kira Lewis	6 ft 1 in (1.85 m)	170 lb (77 kg)	2001-04-06	Alabama
G	0	Didi Louzada	6 ft 5 in (1.96 m)	188 lb (85 kg)	1999-07-02	Brazil
F	8	Naji Marshall	6 ft 7 in (2.01 m)	220 lb (100 kg)	1998-01-24	Xavier
F	21	James Nunnally (TW)	6 ft 7 in (2.01 m)	211 lb (96 kg)	1990-07-14	UC Santa Barbara
F	1	Zion Williamson	6 ft 7 in (2.01 m)	284 lb (129 kg)	2000-07-06	Duke

Coaches
Head coach
- Stan Van Gundy
Assistant(s)
- Bob Beyer
- Casey Hill
- Fred Vinson
- Rex Walters
- Teresa Weatherspoon

Legend
- (DP) Unsigned draft pick
- (FA) Free agent
- (S) Suspended
- (GL) On assignment to G League
- (TW) Two-way affiliate player
- Injured

Roster
Updated: May 7, 2021

== Standings ==
=== Division ===
Southwest Division	W	L	PCT	GB	Home	Road	Div	GP
y – Dallas Mavericks	42	30	.583	–	21‍–‍15	21‍–‍15	7–5	72
x – Memphis Grizzlies	38	34	.528	4.0	18‍–‍18	20‍–‍16	6–6	72
pi – San Antonio Spurs	33	39	.458	9.0	14‍–‍22	19‍–‍17	6–6	72
New Orleans Pelicans	31	41	.431	11.0	18‍–‍18	13‍–‍23	6–6	72
Houston Rockets	17	55	.236	25.0	9‍–‍27	8‍–‍28	5–7	72

=== Conference ===
Western Conference
#	Team	W	L	PCT	GB	GP
1	z – Utah Jazz *	52	20	.722	–	72
2	y – Phoenix Suns *	51	21	.708	1.0	72
3	x – Denver Nuggets	47	25	.653	5.0	72
4	x – Los Angeles Clippers	47	25	.653	5.0	72
5	y – Dallas Mavericks *	42	30	.583	10.0	72
6	x – Portland Trail Blazers	42	30	.583	10.0	72
7	x – Los Angeles Lakers	42	30	.583	10.0	72
8	pi – Golden State Warriors	39	33	.542	13.0	72
9	x – Memphis Grizzlies	38	34	.528	14.0	72
10	pi – San Antonio Spurs	33	39	.458	19.0	72
11	New Orleans Pelicans	31	41	.431	21.0	72
12	Sacramento Kings	31	41	.431	21.0	72
13	Minnesota Timberwolves	23	49	.319	29.0	72
14	Oklahoma City Thunder	22	50	.306	30.0	72
15	Houston Rockets	17	55	.236	35.0	72

Notes

- z – Clinched home court advantage for the entire playoffs
- c – Clinched home court advantage for the conference playoffs
- y – Clinched division title
- x – Clinched playoff spot
- pb – Clinched play-in spot
- o – Eliminated from playoff contention
- * – Division leader

== Game log ==
=== Preseason ===
2020 preseason game log
Total: 2–0 (Home: 1–0; Road: 1–0)
Preseason: 2–0 (home: 1–0; road: 1–0)

Game	Date	Team	Score	High points	High rebounds	High assists	Location Attendance	Record
1	December 11	@ Miami	W 114–92	Zion Williamson (26)	Zion Williamson (11)	Brandon Ingram (6)	AmericanAirlines Arena; 0	1–0
2	December 18	vs Milwaukee	W 127–113	Zion Williamson (31)	Adams, Williamson (9)	Lonzo Ball (8)	Smoothie King Center; 0	2–0

2020–21 season schedule

=== Regular season ===
2020–21 game log
Total: 30–41 (Home: 17–18; Road: 13–23)
December: 3–2 (home: 1–0; road: 2–2)

Game	Date	Team	Score	High points	High rebounds	High assists	Location Attendance	Record
1	December 23	@ Toronto	W 113–99	Brandon Ingram (24)	Zion Williamson (10)	Brandon Ingram (11)	Amalie Arena; 0	1–0
2	December 25	@ Miami	L 98–111	Zion Williamson (32)	Zion Williamson (14)	Ball, Bledsoe (6)	American Airlines Arena; Limited seating	1–1
3	December 27	San Antonio	W 98–95	Brandon Ingram (28)	Brandon Ingram (11)	Brandon Ingram (6)	Smoothie King Center; Limited seating	2–1
4	December 29	@ Phoenix	L 86–111	Zion Williamson (20)	Adams, Melli (8)	Brandon Ingram (6)	Mortgage Matchup Center; 0	2–2
5	December 31	@ Oklahoma City	W 113–80	Brandon Ingram (12)	Steven Adams (10)	Lonzo Ball (9)	Chesapeake Energy Arena; 0	3–2

January: 4–9 (home: 3–4; road: 1–5)

Game	Date	Team	Score	High points	High rebounds	High assists	Location Attendance	Record
6	January 2	Toronto	W 120–116	Brandon Ingram (31)	Steven Adams (10)	Eric Bledsoe (10)	Smoothie King Center; Limited seating	4–2
7	January 4	Indiana	L 116–118 (OT)	Brandon Ingram (31)	Eric Bledsoe (11)	Brandon Ingram (8)	Smoothie King Center; Limited seating	4–3
8	January 6	Oklahoma City	L 110–111	Zion Williamson (29)	Adams, Ingram (11)	Steven Adams (10)	Smoothie King Center; Limited seating	4–4
9	January 8	Charlotte	L 110–118	Zion Williamson (26)	Hart, Ingram, Williamson (8)	Brandon Ingram (8)	Smoothie King Center; Limited seating	4–5
–	January 11	@ Dallas	Postponed (COVID-19) (Makeup date: May 12)					
10	January 13	@ L. A. Clippers	L 106–111	Nickeil Alexander-Walker (37)	Jaxson Hayes (10)	Steven Adams (15)	Staples Center; 0	4–6
11	January 15	@ L. A. Lakers	L 95–112	Zion Williamson (21)	Zion Williamson (12)	Brandon Ingram (5)	Staples Center; 0	4–7
12	January 17	@ Sacramento	W 128–123	Zion Williamson (31)	Steven Adams (15)	Alexander-Walker, Lewis Jr. (5)	Golden 1 Center; 0	5–7
13	January 19	@ Utah	L 102–118	Zion Williamson (32)	Zion Williamson (9)	Ball, Ingram (4)	Vivint Smart Home Arena; Limited seating	5–8
14	January 21	@ Utah	L 118–128	Zion Williamson (27)	Steven Adams (16)	Lonzo Ball (5)	Vivint Smart Home Arena; Limited seating	5–9
15	January 23	@ Minnesota	L 110–120	Brandon Ingram (30)	Zion Williamson (11)	Lonzo Ball (7)	Target Center; 0	5–10
–	January 25	San Antonio	Postponed (COVID-19) (Makeup date: April 24)					
16	January 27	Washington	W 124–106	Ingram, Williamson (32)	Steven Adams (18)	Brandon Ingram (8)	Smoothie King Center; Limited seating	6–10
17	January 29	Milwaukee	W 131–126	Brandon Ingram (28)	Steven Adams (20)	Lonzo Ball (8)	Smoothie King Center; Limited seating	7–10
18	January 30	Houston	L 112–126	Zion Williamson (26)	Lonzo Ball (8)	Eric Bledsoe (5)	Smoothie King Center; Limited seating	7–11

February: 7–8 (home: 5–3; road: 2–5)

Game	Date	Team	Score	High points	High rebounds	High assists	Location Attendance	Record
19	February 1	Sacramento	L 109–118	Brandon Ingram (20)	Josh Hart (13)	Lonzo Ball (5)	Smoothie King Center; 1,440	7–12
20	February 3	Phoenix	W 123–101	Zion Williamson (28)	Steven Adams (13)	Ingram, Williamson (6)	Smoothie King Center; 1,440	8–12
21	February 5	@ Indiana	W 114–113	Brandon Ingram (30)	Steven Adams (12)	Brandon Ingram (7)	Bankers Life Fieldhouse; 0	9–12
22	February 6	Memphis	W 118–109	Zion Williamson (29)	Brandon Ingram (12)	Lonzo Ball (7)	Smoothie King Center; 1,440	10–12
23	February 9	Houston	W 130–101	Brandon Ingram (22)	Josh Hart (17)	Zion Williamson (7)	Smoothie King Center; 1,900	11–12
24	February 10	@ Chicago	L 116–129	Zion Williamson (29)	Adams, Hart (6)	Lonzo Ball (7)	United Center; 0	11–13
25	February 12	@ Dallas	L 130–143	Zion Williamson (36)	Willy Hernangómez (9)	Lonzo Ball (7)	American Airlines Center; Limited seating	11–14
26	February 14	@ Detroit	L 112–123	Ingram, Williamson (26)	Steven Adams (12)	Brandon Ingram (7)	Little Caesars Arena; 0	11–15
27	February 16	@ Memphis	W 144–113	Zion Williamson (31)	Josh Hart (9)	Brandon Ingram (7)	FedEx Forum; 1,982	12–15
28	February 17	Portland	L 124–126	Zion Williamson (36)	Willy Hernangómez (17)	Brandon Ingram (6)	Smoothie King Center; 1,940	12–16
29	February 19	Phoenix	L 114–132	Brandon Ingram (25)	Willy Hernangómez (13)	Lonzo Ball (12)	Smoothie King Center; 1,940	12–17
30	February 21	Boston	W 120–115	Brandon Ingram (33)	Willy Hernangómez (13)	Ball, Williamson (4)	Smoothie King Center; 1,940	13–17
31	February 24	Detroit	W 128–118	Zion Williamson (32)	Steven Adams (15)	Ball, Ingram (8)	Smoothie King Center; 2,700	14–17
32	February 25	@ Milwaukee	L 125–129	Zion Williamson (34)	Steven Adams (13)	Lonzo Ball (8)	Fiserv Forum; 1,800	14–18
33	February 27	@ San Antonio	L 114–117	Brandon Ingram (29)	Zion Williamson (14)	Ingram, Williamson (5)	AT&T Center; 0	14–19

March: 7–6 (home: 5–4; road: 2–2)

Game	Date	Team	Score	High points	High rebounds	High assists	Location Attendance	Record
34	March 1	Utah	W 129–124	Ingram, Williamson (26)	Steven Adams (11)	Lonzo Ball (8)	Smoothie King Center; 2,700	15–19
35	March 3	Chicago	L 124–128	Zion Williamson (28)	Zion Williamson (9)	Eric Bledsoe (10)	Smoothie King Center; 2,700	15–20
36	March 4	Miami	L 93–103	Brandon Ingram (17)	Josh Hart (8)	Brandon Ingram (9)	Smoothie King Center; 2,700	15–21
37	March 11	Minnesota	L 105–135	Zion Williamson (24)	Josh Hart (13)	Lonzo Ball (7)	Smoothie King Center; 3,700	15–22
38	March 12	Cleveland	W 116–82	Brandon Ingram (28)	Steven Adams (17)	Lonzo Ball (6)	Smoothie King Center; 3,700	16–22
39	March 14	L. A. Clippers	W 135–115	Zion Williamson (27)	Adams, Ball (8)	Eric Bledsoe (8)	Smoothie King Center; 3,700	17–22
40	March 16	@ Portland	L 124–125	Brandon Ingram (30)	Josh Hart (8)	Lonzo Ball (17)	Moda Center; 0	17–23
41	March 18	@ Portland	L 93–101	Zion Williamson (26)	Adams, Williamson (10)	Lonzo Ball (8)	Moda Center; 0	17–24
42	March 21	@ Denver	W 113–108	Ingram, Williamson (30)	Steven Adams (13)	Brandon Ingram (8)	Ball Arena; 0	18–24
43	March 23	L. A. Lakers	W 128–111	Brandon Ingram (36)	Josh Hart (15)	Kira Lewis (6)	Smoothie King Center; 3,700	19–24
44	March 26	Denver	L 108–113	Zion Williamson (39)	Zion Williamson (10)	Eric Bledsoe (9)	Smoothie King Center; 3,700	19–25
45	March 27	@ Dallas	W 112–103	Zion Williamson (38)	Josh Hart (10)	Zion Williamson (6)	Smoothie King Center; 3,700	20–25
46	March 29	@ Boston	W 115–109	Zion Williamson (28)	Josh Hart (15)	Brandon Ingram (9)	TD Garden; 2,298	21–25

April: 7–10 (home: 3–5; road: 4–5)

Game	Date	Team	Score	High points	High rebounds	High assists	Location Attendance	Record
47	April 1	Orlando	L 110–115	Nickeil Alexander-Walker (31)	Josh Hart (17)	Eric Bledsoe (6)	Smoothie King Center; 3,700	21–26
48	April 2	Atlanta	L 103–126	Kira Lewis Jr. (21)	Willy Hernangómez (9)	James Johnson (6)	Smoothie King Center; 3,700	21–27
49	April 4	@ Houston	W 122–115	Lonzo Ball (27)	Willy Hernangómez (12)	Lonzo Ball (9)	Toyota Center; 3,268	22–27
50	April 6	@ Atlanta	L 107–123	Zion Williamson (34)	Ball, Marshall (9)	Lonzo Ball (11)	State Farm Arena; 2,816	22–28
51	April 7	@ Brooklyn	L 111–139	Eric Bledsoe (26)	Willy Hernangómez (7)	Johnson, Williamson (6)	Barclays Center; 1,773	22–29
52	April 9	Philadelphia	W 101–94	Zion Williamson (37)	Zion Williamson (15)	Zion Williamson (8)	Smoothie King Center; 3,700	23–29
53	April 11	@ Cleveland	W 116–109	Zion Williamson (38)	Zion Williamson (9)	Brandon Ingram (8)	Rocket Mortgage FieldHouse; 4,148	24–29
54	April 12	Sacramento	W 117–110	Brandon Ingram (34)	Steven Adams (16)	Brandon Ingram (7)	Smoothie King Center; 3,700	25–29
55	April 14	New York	L 106–116	Brandon Ingram (28)	Steven Adams (10)	Ingram, Williamson (7)	Smoothie King Center; 3,700	25–30
56	April 16	@ Washington	L 115–117 (OT)	Brandon Ingram (34)	Steven Adams (12)	Naji Marshall (6)	Capital One Arena; 0	25–31
57	April 18	@ New York	L 112–122	Zion Williamson (34)	Steven Adams (14)	Zion Williamson (5)	Madison Square Garden; 1,981	25–32
58	April 20	Brooklyn	L 129–134	Zion Williamson (33)	Zion Williamson (7)	Naji Marshall (7)	Smoothie King Center; 3,700	25–33
59	April 22	@ Orlando	W 135–100	Brandon Ingram (29)	Willy Hernangómez (12)	Lonzo Ball (12)	Amway Center; 3,411	26–33
60	April 24	San Antonio	L 108–110	Zion Williamson (33)	Zion Williamson (14)	Brandon Ingram (6)	Smoothie King Center; 3,700	26–34
61	April 26	L. A. Clippers	W 120–103	Zion Williamson (23)	Willy Hernangómez (10)	Lonzo Ball (7)	Smoothie King Center; 3,700	27–34
62	April 28	@ Denver	L 112–114	Brandon Ingram (27)	Lonzo Ball (12)	Lonzo Ball (12)	Ball Arena; 4,022	27–35
63	April 29	@ Oklahoma City	W 109–95	Zion Williamson (27)	Ball, Hernangómez (10)	Ball, Williamson (6)	Chesapeake Energy Arena; 0	28–35

May: 3–6 (home: 1–2; road: 2–4)

Game	Date	Team	Score	High points	High rebounds	High assists	Location Attendance	Record
64	May 1	@ Minnesota	W 140–136	Zion Williamson (37)	Lonzo Ball (11)	Ball, Williamson (8)	Target Center; 1,638	29–35
65	May 3	Golden State	L 108–123	Zion Williamson (32)	Zion Williamson (8)	Lonzo Ball (8)	Smoothie King Center; 3,700	29–36
66	May 5	Golden State	W 108–103	Lonzo Ball (33)	Zion Williamson (12)	Zion Williamson (7)	Smoothie King Center; 3,700	30–36
67	May 7	@ Philadelphia	L 107–109	Jaxson Hayes (19)	Willy Hernangómez (9)	Hernangómez, Marshall (5)	Wells Fargo Center; 5,119	30–37
68	May 9	@ Charlotte	W 112–110	Eric Bledsoe (24)	Willy Hernangómez (16)	Eric Bledsoe (11)	Spectrum Center; 4,196	31–37
69	May 10	@ Memphis	L 110–115	Nickeil Alexander-Walker (18)	Naji Marshall (11)	Nickeil Alexander-Walker (6)	FedExForum; 2,507	31–38
70	May 12	@ Dallas	L 107–125	Bledsoe, Hayes (15)	Willy Hernangómez (10)	Eric Bledsoe (4)	American Airlines Center; 4,373	31–39
71	May 14	@ Golden State	L 122–125	Nickeil Alexander-Walker (30)	Naji Marshall (13)	Alexander-Walker, Bledsoe (4)	Chase Center; 4,155	31–40
72	May 16	L. A. Lakers	L 98–110	Willy Hernangómez (19)	Willy Hernangómez (13)	Naji Marshall (7)	Smoothie King Center; 3,700	31–41

2020–21 season schedule

== Player statistics ==
Legend
GP	Games played	GS	Games started	MPG	Minutes per game
FG%	Field-goal percentage	3P%	3-point field-goal percentage	FT%	Free-throw percentage
RPG	Rebounds per game	APG	Assists per game	SPG	Steals per game
BPG	Blocks per game	PPG	Points per game

=== Regular season ===
New Orleans Pelicans statistics
Player	GP	GS	MPG	FG%	3P%	FT%	RPG	APG	SPG	BPG	PPG
Eric Bledsoe	71	70	29.7	.421	.341	.687	3.4	3.8	.8	.3	12.2
Brandon Ingram	61	61	34.3	.466	.381	.878	4.9	4.9	.7	.6	23.8
Zion Williamson	61	61	33.2	.611	.294	.698	7.2	3.7	.9	.6	27.0
Jaxson Hayes	60	3	16.1	.625	.429	.775	4.3	.6	.4	.6	7.5
Steven Adams	58	58	27.7	.614	.000	.444	8.9	1.9	.9	.7	7.6
Lonzo Ball	55	55	31.8	.414	.378	.781	4.8	5.7	1.5	.6	14.6
Kira Lewis Jr.	54	0	16.7	.386	.333	.843	1.3	2.3	.7	.2	6.4
Willy Hernangómez	47	12	18.0	.563	.100	.667	7.1	1.1	.5	.5	7.8
Josh Hart	47	4	28.7	.439	.326	.775	8.0	2.3	.8	.3	9.2
Nickeil Alexander-Walker	46	13	21.9	.419	.347	.727	3.1	2.2	1.0	.5	11.0
Naji Marshall	32	10	21.9	.392	.349	.707	4.6	2.8	.8	.3	7.7
JJ Redick^{†}	31	0	18.6	.407	.364	.957	1.7	1.3	.3	.1	8.7
James Johnson^{†}	22	11	24.5	.434	.267	.596	4.1	2.2	.8	.9	9.2
Nicolò Melli^{†}	22	0	11.0	.254	.189	.857	2.6	1.1	.4	.0	2.0
Wenyen Gabriel	21	0	11.5	.400	.406	.647	2.6	.5	.4	.4	3.4
Wes Iwundu^{†}	18	1	13.9	.340	.111	.824	2.6	.4	.3	.1	2.8
Sindarius Thornwell^{†}	14	1	5.2	.333	.333	.000	.4	.3	.4	.1	1.2
James Nunnally	9	0	5.3	.385	.333	.500	1.0	.3	.0	.0	1.7
Didi Louzada	3	0	18.7	.231	.250		1.0	1.0	.7	.0	2.7
Isaiah Thomas	3	0	16.0	.333	.250	1.000	1.3	1.7	.3	.0	7.7
Will Magnay	1	0	3.0	.000	.000		.0	.0	.0	.0	.0

- ^{†} Denotes player spent time with another team in the season. Stats reflect time with the Pelicans only.

== Transactions ==
=== Free agency ===
==== Re-signed ====
Player	Signed

==== Additions ====
Player	Signed	Former team

==== Subtractions ====
Player	Reason left	New team

-->
