= Nico Harrison =

American basketball executive (born 1972)

Personal information
- Born: December 28, 1972 (age 53) Seattle, Washington, U.S.
- Listed height: 6 ft 5 in (1.96 m)

Career information
- High school: Tigard (Tigard, Oregon)
- College: Army (1991–1992); Montana State (1993–1996)
- NBA draft: 1996: undrafted
- Playing career: 1996–2001
- Position: Forward

Career history
- 1996–1997: ABB Leuven
- 1997–1998: Black Hills Posse
- 1998–2000: Hitachi Honsha Rising Sun

Career highlights
- As player: 3× First-team All-Big Sky (1994–1996); Patriot League All-Freshman team (1992)

Nico Tyrone Harrison (born December 28, 1972) is an American former professional basketball executive and player who was the president of basketball operations and general manager of the Dallas Mavericks of the National Basketball Association (NBA) from 2021 to 2025.

In 2021, Harrison succeeded Donnie Nelson as the general manager and president of basketball operations for the Dallas Mavericks. On the night of February 1–2, 2025, Harrison and Los Angeles Lakers general manager Rob Pelinka executed the Luka Dončić–Anthony Davis trade, one of the most criticized trades in NBA history. The trade was met with overwhelming negativity from Mavericks fans and media.

Following the Mavericks' sluggish start to the 2025–26 season and continued negativity from the fan base, On November 11, 2025, Mavericks governor Patrick Dumont announced the organization had fired Harrison.

Harrison has since been widely regarded as one of the worst general managers in recent NBA history.

== Early life ==
Harrison was born on December 28, 1972 in Seattle, Washington. He is the son of Steve and Christie Harrison (née Martinez), and was the fourth of their five children. Harrison's parents divorced when he was five years old, and he split time between Spokane, Washington, and Tigard, Oregon, while growing up. As a child, Harrison played both American football and basketball, before shifting his focus solely to basketball in ninth grade. Harrison attended Tigard High School after determining it would be his best opportunity to earn a college basketball scholarship.

== College career ==
Harrison struggled with injuries during his junior and senior seasons in high school, and West Point was the only school that continued to recruit him. In his freshman year of college in 1991, Harrison averaged 9.7 points and 3.8 rebounds per game for the Black Knights. He was selected to the Patriot League All-Freshman team in 1992.

After one year at West Point, Harrison transferred to Montana State University. Due to NCAA transfer rules, Harrison was required to sit out of the 1992-93 NCAA season. In three seasons with the Bobcats between 1993 and 1996, Harrison averaged 12 points, 2.4 assists, and 4.2 rebounds per game. In his senior year in 1996, Harrison averaged 13.7 points per game and helped lead the Bobcats to the NCAA tournament, where they were eliminated in the first round by Syracuse 88-55. Harrison was selected to the first team All-Big Sky Conference in each of his three years with the Bobcats. Harrison graduated with a degree in biological and medical sciences and was a two-time Arthur Ashe Jr. Scholar-Athlete award winner. In 2015, Harrison was inducted into the Montana State Bobcats Hall of Fame.

== Professional basketball career ==
Harrison went undrafted by the NBA after graduating from Montana State. He first played professionally for ABB Leuven in Belgium in the 1996-97 season. Harrison played for the Black Hills Posse of the International Basketball Association (IBA) during the 1997–98 season where he averaged 8.9 points and 3.2 rebounds in 21 minutes. He then played two years for the Hitachi Honsha Rising Sun in Japan from 1998 until 2000. His final year playing basketball was in Lebanon with a team in Beirut.

== Nike ==
Following the end of his playing career, Harrison moved back to Oregon, where he took up a job as a pharmaceutical sales representative. In 2002, a friend informed him of an open position at Nike as a regional field representative for the NBA. Harrison applied and was hired, moving to Dallas, Texas, where the job was based. As part of the role, Harrison represented players such as Michael Finley, Dirk Nowitzki, Tim Duncan, and Jermaine O'Neal. In 2003, Harrison was promoted to a national marketing role with Nike, where he worked with prominent basketball stars like Michael Jordan and Kobe Bryant. Harrison was eventually promoted to the role of vice president of North American basketball operations, where he worked until 2021. Over his 19 years at Nike, Harrison became known for his trustworthiness and ability to develop personal connections, making him a popular figure with NBA players.

During his work at Nike, he botched a 2013 presentation to Stephen Curry, where according to Harrison he may have called him Seth, and the presentation used was made for Kevin Durant. This, along with not offering Curry a signature shoe, caused the budding superstar to switch from Nike and sign with Under Armour.

== Executive career ==
On June 28, 2021, Harrison was appointed as the general manager and president of basketball operations for the Dallas Mavericks, succeeding Donnie Nelson. This appointment coincided with the hiring of Jason Kidd as the head coach.

During Harrison's first three seasons as GM, the Mavericks reached the conference finals twice and the NBA Finals in 2024. In June 2024 after reaching the NBA Finals, the Mavericks gave Harrison a multi-year contract extension.

At the end of Harrison's first season with the team, on July 12, 2022, Jalen Brunson left as a free agent to sign a four-year, $104 million contract with the New York Knicks.

=== Luka Dončić trade and firing ===
Together with longtime friend Rob Pelinka, Harrison engineered the February 2025 trade of Mavericks superstar Luka Dončić to the Los Angeles Lakers, considered by many as one of the most shocking trades in the history of the NBA.

The trade received overwhelmingly negative reactions from Mavericks fans and the media, especially given that the Mavericks had just made the NBA Finals the previous season with a team built around Dončić. Public response to the trade included death threats directed at Harrison, as well as "Fire Nico" chants, fan-made merchandise, and social media remarks for months after. The Mavericks organization subsequently ejected from the arena those chanting, holding up signs, and wearing shirts of "Fire Nico", leading to increased protest. These chants were also heard at unrelated sports games, a St. Patrick's Day parade, and a Medieval Times dinner show. Additionally, fans and businesses installed billboards and murals calling for Harrison's firing. The continued public disapproval led to many calling Harrison "the most hated man in Dallas".

Harrison defended his decision, stating "defense wins championships" and adding that Anthony Davis exemplified the culture the Mavericks front office was trying to create. Davis subsequently reaggravated an abdominal injury during his first game with the Mavericks which kept him out for a significant period. Similarly, Harrison's mismanagement and training staff decisions were also criticized as a cause of the disproportionate load management in the wake of the absence of Dončić on the court, leading to the season-ending injuries of Mavericks starters Kyrie Irving, Dereck Lively II, and Daniel Gafford.

Harrison also responded, "I did know that Luka was important to the fan base. I didn't quite know it to what level." Harrison's ignorance of Dončić's success, ability, and popularity drew harsh criticism from the majority of fans, including Charles Barkley and other commentators.

After the Dončić trade, the Mavericks ended their season by losing in the play in against the Memphis Grizzlies. The Mavericks unexpectedly won the first overall pick in the 2025 NBA Draft, despite having less than a 2% chance of getting the pick in the lottery. The Mavericks selected Cooper Flagg with the first overall pick, amidst continued chants of "Fire Nico".

On November 11, 2025, Harrison was relieved of his duties with the Mavericks organization after a 3–8 start to the 2025–26 season. In an open letter to Mavericks fans, team owner Patrick Dumont stressed that "this decision was critical to moving our franchise forward in a positive direction", presumably alluding to the backlash directed towards Harrison and the team following the Dončić trade.

== Personal life ==
Harrison has four siblings, three older and one younger: Joe, Elizabeth, Shivaun, and Brandon. Harrison has been married to Darlise Harrison, a producer for ABC News and BET since 2008. They have two daughters.

== Career statistics ==
Legend
| GP | Games played | GS | Games started | MPG | Minutes per game |
| FG% | Field goal percentage | 3P% | 3-point field goal percentage | FT% | Free throw percentage |
| RPG | Rebounds per game | APG | Assists per game | SPG | Steals per game |
| BPG | Blocks per game | PPG | Points per game | **Bold** | Career high |

=== College ===
| * | Led Big Sky Conference |

| Year | Team | GP | GS | MPG | FG% | 3P% | FT% | RPG | APG | SPG | BPG | PPG |
|---|---|---|---|---|---|---|---|---|---|---|---|---|
| 1991–92 | Army | 25 | 23 | 27.7 | .434 | **.444** | .556 | 3.4 | 1.4 | 1.2 | **.6** | 9.7 |
| 1993–94 | Montana State | 26 | | 24.9 | **.624** | .000 | **.778** | 4.0 | 1.3 | 1.3 | **.6** | 10.6 |
| 1994–95 | Montana State | 29 | 29 | 27.4 | .613 | .231 | .624 | **4.4** | 2.7 | **1.8** | .3 | 11.8 |
| 1995–96 | Montana State | **30*** | **30*** | **31.7** | .577 | .343 | .732 | 4.2 | **3.1** | 1.2 | **.6** | **13.7** |
| Career | | 110 | 82 | 28.0 | .560 | .328 | .676 | 4.0 | 2.2 | 1.4 | .5 | 11.6 |
