= Dallas Mavericks =

National Basketball Association team in Dallas, Texas

- 2026–27 Dallas Mavericks season
- Conference: Western
- Division: Southwest
- Founded: 1980
- History: Dallas Mavericks; 1980–present
- Arena: American Airlines Center
- Location: Dallas, Texas
- Team colors: Royal blue, navy, silver, black
- Main sponsor: Chase Bank
- CEO: Rick Welts
- President: Masai Ujiri
- General manager: Mike Schmitz
- Head coach: Dusty May
- Ownership: Patrick Dumont (69%); Mark Cuban (27%); Mary Stanton (4%)
- Affiliation: Texas Legends
- Championships: 1 (2011)
- Conference titles: 3 (2006, 2011, 2024)
- Division titles: 5 (1987, 2007, 2010, 2021, 2024)
- Retired numbers: 5 (12, 15, 22, 24, 41)
- Website: nba.com/mavericks
| Association | Icon |

The Dallas Mavericks, often referred to as the Mavs, are an American professional basketball team based in Dallas. The Mavericks compete in the National Basketball Association (NBA) as a member of the Southwest Division of the Western Conference. The team plays its home games at American Airlines Center, which it shares with the National Hockey League's Dallas Stars.

Throughout the 1980s, the Mavericks were a perennial playoff team, led by All-Stars Rolando Blackman and Mark Aguirre. They struggled during the 1990s, entering a period of rebuilding, until the acquisition of Dirk Nowitzki in 1998. Nowitzki would become the cornerstone of the most successful period in franchise history, leading the team to its first NBA Finals appearance in 2006 and its only NBA championship in 2011.

The Mavericks later entered a rebuilding phase in the tail end of Nowitzki's storied career; although they missed the playoffs in three consecutive years from 2017 to 2019 (after which Nowitzki retired following his record-breaking 21st season with Dallas), the franchise's fortunes immediately rebounded once again with the acquisition of Luka Dončić; the Mavericks returned to the playoffs in 2020, reached the Western Conference finals in 2022 for the first time since their 2011 championship, and reached their third NBA Finals in 2024. In February 2025, the Mavericks traded Dončić to the Los Angeles Lakers mainly for Anthony Davis.

Since the Mavericks' inaugural 1980–81 season, the Mavericks have won five division titles (1987, 2007, 2010, 2021, 2024), three conference championships (2006, 2011, 2024) and one NBA championship (2011).

== History ==
=== 1978–1981: The creation and early years of the Mavericks ===
In 1978, Californian businessman Garn Eckardt met Dallas lawyer Doug Adkins and mentioned he was trying to raise capital to move an NBA team to Dallas. Asking for a possible partner, Adkins recommended him one of his clients, Home Interiors and Gifts owner Don Carter. Negotiations with Eckardt fell through, but Carter remained interested in the enterprise as a gift to his wife Linda, who played basketball while at Duncanville High School. Simultaneously, Buffalo Braves president and general manager Norm Sonju developed an interest in bringing the NBA to Dallas as he studied possible new locations for the ailing franchise. While the Braves went to California as the San Diego Clippers, Sonju eventually returned to Texas. He was introduced to Carter by Mayor Robert Folsom, one of the owners and team president of the last professional basketball team in the city, the Dallas Chaparrals of the American Basketball Association, which moved to San Antonio in 1973 becoming the San Antonio Spurs. Sonju and Carter tried purchasing both the Milwaukee Bucks and the Kansas City Kings, but disagreement on relocation stalled the negotiations, leading them to instead aim for an expansion team.

The league was initially reluctant to expand to Dallas, given Texas had both the Spurs and Houston Rockets. The 1978–79 season was proving unprofitable (18 out of the 22 teams lost money) and unpopular (television ratings fell 26 percent). Still, during the 1979 NBA All-Star Game weekend, NBA commissioner Larry O'Brien announced the league would add two new teams in the 1980–81 season, with teams in Dallas and Minneapolis. Once the potential Minnesota owners backed out, only Dallas remained (the Minnesota Timberwolves would not join until 1989). Through negotiations with general counselor and future commissioner David Stern, the expansion fee was settled on $12.5 million. Carter would provide half the amount.

At the 1980 NBA All-Star Game, league owners voted to admit the new team, with the team's name coming from the 1957–1962 TV western Maverick; the fans chose the title with 4,600 postcards received, beating Wranglers and Express. James Garner, who played the title character, was a member of the ownership group. The University of Texas at Arlington, who also uses the Mavericks nickname, had objections about a shared name but did not attempt any legal action. They joined the Midwest Division of the Western Conference, where they would stay until the league went to six divisions for the 2004–05 season. Dick Motta, who had guided the Washington Bullets to the NBA Championship in 1977–78, was hired as the team's first head coach.

The Mavs drafted Kiki VanDeWeghe of UCLA with the 11th pick of the 1980 NBA draft. Still, VanDeWeghe refused to play for the expansion Mavericks and staged a holdout that lasted a month into its inaugural season. VanDeWeghe was traded to the Denver Nuggets, along with a first-round pick, in 1981, in exchange for two future first-round picks that eventually materialized into Rolando Blackman in 1981, and Sam Vincent in 1985.

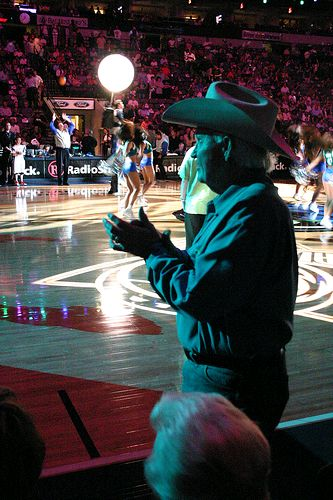
Mavs' founder Don Carter

In the Mavericks debut game, taking place in the brand-new Reunion Arena, the Mavericks defeated the Spurs, 103–92. But the Mavs started the season with a 6–40 record on their way to finishing 15–67. However, the Mavericks did make a player acquisition that, while it seemed minor at the time, turned out to play a significant role in the early years of their franchise. Journeyman 6 ft 3 in guard Brad Davis, who played for the Anchorage Northern Knights of the Continental Basketball Association, was tracked down and signed by the Mavericks in December after a scout watched a game with Davis. He had to be convinced to play for the team rather than attend to his studies at the University of Maryland (which he was funding by playing for Anchorage). He would play for the remainder of the season after joining in December. Davis would spend the next twelve years with the Mavericks, and eventually, his number 15 jersey was retired. The Mavericks also marked the first NBA team to have a profitable debut season, with 7,789 spectators per game.

The 1981 NBA Draft brought three players who would become vital parts of the team. The Mavs selected forward Mark Aguirre with the first pick, guard Rolando Blackman ninth, and forward Jay Vincent at 24th. By the end of his seven-year Mavericks career, Aguirre would average 24.6 points per game. Blackman contributed 19.2 points over his 11-year career in Dallas. But it was Jay Vincent who made the most significant difference for the Mavs in their second season, leading the team in scoring with 21.4 points per game and earning NBA All-Rookie Team honors. The Mavericks improved to 28–54, getting out of the Midwest Division cellar as they finished above the Utah Jazz.

=== 1982–1990: Playoff contention ===
In 1982–83, the Mavericks were serious contenders for the first time. At the All-Star break, they were 25–24 and had won 12 of their last 15 games. They could not sustain that momentum and finished seven games behind the Denver Nuggets for the sixth and final playoff spot in the Western Conference. But the Mavs' 38–44 record was a 10-game improvement from the previous season.

Mark Aguirre led the 1982–83 Mavericks with 24.4 points per game, finishing sixth in the NBA. Jay Vincent and Rolando Blackman contributed 18.7 and 17.7 points per game, respectively. Brad Davis was 10th in the NBA in assists with 7.2 per game and shot .845 from the free-throw line, sixth in the league. The Mavs drafted Derek Harper with the 11th pick of the 1983 NBA draft. The 6 ft 4 in guard would spend the next decade with the organization, averaging 15 points and 6.1 assists. The Mavericks' in 1983–84 posted a winning record for the first time in franchise history, finishing 43–39 and second in the Midwest Division. The Mavs also earned the first playoff berth in franchise history. Mark Aguirre was named the team's first NBA All-Star, as he finished with an average of 29.5 points per game—second in the league to Utah's Adrian Dantley.

Dallas finished with the fourth seed in the Western Conference playoffs, and in their first playoff trip, they defeated the Seattle SuperSonics in five games. The fifth and deciding game of that series was played at Moody Coliseum, as Reunion Arena, then the home court for the Mavericks was hosting a tennis tournament. The Magic Johnson-led Los Angeles Lakers, were next for the Mavs, and the young club fell short, losing four games to one. But a trade the Mavericks made in their inaugural season of 1980 paid off for them in 1984 because they owned Cleveland's first-round pick, which ended up being the fourth pick overall. The Mavs used it to select forward-center Sam Perkins, a former North Carolina Tar Heel, with a surprising range from the three-point line who would average 14.4 points and 8.0 rebounds in six seasons with Dallas.

About this time, the Dallas Cowboys, once one of the NFL's elite teams, began a slow decline that eventually saw them fall to 1–15 in 1989. The Mavs were hitting their stride simultaneously and replaced the Cowboys as the Metroplex's most popular team. The 1984–85 team finished a game better than the previous year at 44–38. Mark Aguirre led the team in scoring again with 25.7 ppg, Sam Perkins made the All-Rookie team, and Rolando Blackman represented the Mavericks in the 1985 NBA All-Star Game. The Mavs returned to the playoffs in 1985 but were not as successful as they had been. They won Game 1 in double-overtime against the Portland Trail Blazers in their first-round playoff series, but lost the next three games in a row, ending their season.

Dallas had the eighth pick in the 1985 NBA draft—again due to a trade with the Cavaliers—and drafted German-born forward Detlef Schrempf out of Washington. He would show flashes of brilliance in his three-plus seasons with the team, but it was not until he was traded to the Indiana Pacers that he displayed his full potential. The Mavericks also traded center Kurt Nimphius to the Los Angeles Clippers for center James Donaldson, who would play for the Mavericks until halfway through the 1991–92 season. This trade allowed the Mavericks to have a steady hand at the center position lacking throughout the franchise's first five years. In 1988, James Donaldson became the first Dallas Mavericks center in club history to be selected to play in the NBA All-Star Game.

Rolando Blackman represented the Mavericks in the 1986 NBA All-Star Game, hosted by Dallas at Reunion Arena. The 1985–86 Mavericks were second in scoring at 115.3 points per game, gaining their third-straight playoff appearance. They defeated Utah three games to one in the first round. In the conference semi-finals, they ran into the Lakers again, and L.A. defeated Dallas in six games. But four of those games were decided by four points or fewer, and Dallas won half of those, leaving Mavericks fans room to hope that they could finally top the Lakers in the following season. The Mavs drafted Michigan center Roy Tarpley with the seventh overall pick, who would become a very talented—but troubled—member of the roster.

The 1986–87 Mavericks team had their most successful regular season to date, going 55–27 and winning their first Midwest Division title. But despite the great expectations surrounding the team, they self-destructed in the playoffs. After hammering the Seattle SuperSonics by 22 points in Game 1, the bottom dropped out for the Mavs, as they lost Games 2 and 3 in close fashion before succumbing to Game 4 in Seattle. Following the unexpected early playoff exit, Motta, who had been with the team since its inception, shockingly resigned as head coach. John MacLeod, who had led the Phoenix Suns to nine playoff berths in 11 seasons, including an NBA Finals run in 1976, was hired as his replacement.

The 1987–88 NBA season saw the Mavericks dip just a little bit in the regular season—finishing 53–29 and losing their Midwest Division title to the Denver Nuggets—but it was another successful year for the team. Mark Aguirre and James Donaldson both played in the 1988 NBA All-Star Game, the Mavericks rattled off a franchise-best 11-game winning streak, and Rolando Blackman scored his 10,000th career point. Aguirre led the team in scoring for the sixth consecutive year with 25.1 points per game, and Roy Tarpley won the NBA Sixth Man Award with averages of 13.5 points and 11.8 rebounds. The season saw the Mavs' deepest playoff run to date. They dispatched the Houston Rockets in four games and the Nuggets in six, leaving only the defending NBA Champion Lakers between them and their first-ever trip to the NBA Finals. The Mavericks gave the Lakers everything they could handle. Still, in the end, the more experienced Lakers prevailed, defeating Dallas in seven games on the way to eventually winning their second consecutive NBA Championship.

Despite all the changes, the Mavs remained in contention. However, their season effectively ended when James Donaldson went down with a ruptured patella tendon on March 10, 1989, and missed the rest of the season. The Mavericks were left understaffed, demoralized, and disheartened as they finished with a 38–44 record. It was their first losing season since 1982–83—which was also the last time they missed the playoffs.

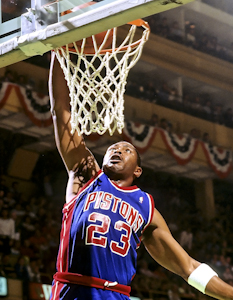
Mark Aguirre (pictured here with the Detroit Pistons) played with the Mavericks from 1981 to 1989.

The Mavericks returned to the playoffs in 1989–90 with a 47–35 record, but it was another season of off-court chaos. On November 15, only six games into the Mavs' season, Tarpley was arrested for driving while intoxicated and resisting arrest. The team started 5–6, and MacLeod was fired, replaced by assistant coach Richie Adubato. The Mavs finished the season with four straight victories to surge into the playoffs but went down rather meekly to the Portland Trail Blazers in three games. It would be the team's last winning season and playoff appearance until 2001.

=== 1990–1998: Rebuilding ===
==== 1990–1994: Free falling ====
The team endured numerous changes in 1990, losing Sam Perkins to the Lakers via free agency and suffering injuries to practically their entire 1990–91 starting lineup. The players they managed to acquire—Rodney McCray, Fat Lever, and Alex English—were all in the twilight of their careers. On November 9, it was announced that Fat Lever would have season-ending surgery on his right knee, and that very night, Tarpley suffered a knee injury of his own, which ended his season. The Mavericks' season only got worse from there, and they finished with a record of 28–54, falling behind even the second-year Minnesota Timberwolves and Orlando Magic. In March 1991, Tarpley was charged with suspicion of driving while intoxicated and was suspended again by the NBA.

It got even worse in 1991–92. Before the season even began, Tarpley violated the league's substance abuse policy for the third time and was banned from the NBA for life. The former Sixth Man Award winner's fall from grace was complete. The few talented players the Mavericks had remaining to them were lost to injury. Brad Davis' back problems forced him to retire in mid-January, and Fat Lever had knee surgery again on January 29, missing the remainder of the season—hardly worth the cost of losing two first-round draft picks. The team finished with a 22–60 record.

In 1992–93, the rebuilding began in earnest, with the Mavs trading Rolando Blackman—who by that point had surpassed Mark Aguirre as the team's all-time leading scorer—to the New York Knicks for a first-round draft pick. Blackman had made four All-Star Game appearances in his Mavericks career. Herb Williams joined the Knicks as a free agent. Fat Lever underwent more surgery and missed the entire 1992–93 season. Derek Harper was the team's only bright spot, leading the team with 18.3 points per game.

The Mavericks selected Ohio State guard Jim Jackson with the fourth overall pick of the 1992 NBA draft, but he and owner Donald Carter could not come to terms on a contract for half of his rookie season. Jackson only played 28 games in 1992–93, a season also ruined by trades, a coaching change, and injuries. The Mavericks started 2–27 and fired Adubato on January 13, replacing him with Gar Heard. The Mavericks came dangerously close to setting the all-time worst record in NBA history (at the time, 9–73 by the 1972–73 Philadelphia 76ers). But when Jackson was signed on March 3, the Mavs rallied, closing the season with a 7–14 mark, including two straight wins to end the season and finishing 11–71, the second-worst record in NBA history.

Dallas selected Kentucky forward Jamal Mashburn with the fourth overall pick of the 1993 NBA draft and hired Quinn Buckner as head coach. Buckner decided from the start to be a disciplinarian on the model of his college coach, Bobby Knight, who told Buckner that the only way he would succeed with the Mavs would be to run the team with an iron hand. The mostly young roster did not respond very well to Buckner's stern coaching style and started 1–23. By the end of January, they were 3–40, and it was once again possible that they could tie the 1973 Sixers for the all-time worst record in the league. But 5–9 records in February and April, coupled with Buckner loosening the reins a little bit, helped the Mavs finish 13–69. It was still the worst record in the league by far, but the Mavericks again avoided setting an all-time futility record. However, they did tie the NBA's single-season record for consecutive losses at 20 games (since broken).

Buckner was fired at the end of the season despite having a five-year contract. However, Carter decided that Buckner had "burned too many bridges" due to his autocratic coaching style. He compiled the worst record for a rookie NBA head coach, a record that only lasted four years until Bill Hanzlik broke it with the Denver Nuggets. The Mavericks brought back Dick Motta, who had led the franchise to some of its most successful seasons. The Mavericks also wound up with the number two pick in the 1994 NBA draft and picked up Cal point guard Jason Kidd, giving them a solid tandem of Jackson, Mashburn, and Kidd, known as "The Three Js."

==== 1994–1996: Arrival of Jason Kidd ====
The addition of Jason Kidd infused the Mavericks with new life in 1994–95. Kidd averaged 11.7 points, 5.4 rebounds, and 7.7 assists in his rookie season and led the league in triple-doubles. Roy Tarpley was allowed to return to the league after three years and helped with 12.6 points and 8.2 rebounds per game. The tandem of Jim Jackson and Jamal Mashburn combined as the league's highest-scoring pair of teammates. On separate occasions, Mashburn and Jackson scored 50 points in a game that season. Mashburn contributed 24.1 points per game, fifth in the NBA; Jackson averaged 25.7 points but suffered a severe ankle sprain in February, which caused him to miss the regular season's remainder. Second-year forward Popeye Jones had a great year as well, as he averaged 10.6 rebounds and led the NBA in offensive rebounds.

The Mavericks' improvement was dramatic. The team jumped to 36–46, 10th in the Western Conference, and only five games behind the Denver Nuggets for the eighth and final playoff spot. It was the most significant one-year improvement in the team's history. Many expected the Mavericks' improvement to continue with the franchise's first foray into the NBA playoffs since 1990. But despite a 4–0 start, the 1995–96 season was a disappointment as for the second time in his career, Roy Tarpley was given a lifelong ban from the NBA for repeated violations of the anti-drug policy—he never played in the NBA again. Jamal Mashburn had season-ending surgery to repair his sore right knee, only 18 games into the Mavericks' schedule.

The team's two remaining stars, Jason Kidd and Jim Jackson bickered throughout the season, though neither of them had trouble establishing his stardom. Jackson led the team scoring with 19.6 ppg, made 121 three-pointers, and was the only Mav to start 82 games. Kidd became the first Maverick to be elected a starter in the NBA All-Star Game and finished second in the league in assists and fourth in steals while averaging 16.6 ppg. George McCloud, who averaged 9.6 ppg in his previous year, blew away his career-high scoring average as the Mavs resorted to the outside shot time and again due to their lack of an inside scoring threat. McCloud averaged 18.9 ppg and made 257 three-pointers, equaling the second-highest individual season total in league history.

Overall, the Mavericks connected on 735 of their 2,039 three-point attempts, both new league records. The Mavs finished 26–56, fifth in the Midwest Division, and 33 games out of first place. Motta was relieved of his head coaching responsibilities at season's end and replaced by former Bulls assistant coach Jim Cleamons. And Don Carter, the only owner the Mavericks had ever had, sold the team to a group of investors led by H. Ross Perot, Jr.

==== 1996–1998: Arrival of Michael Finley ====
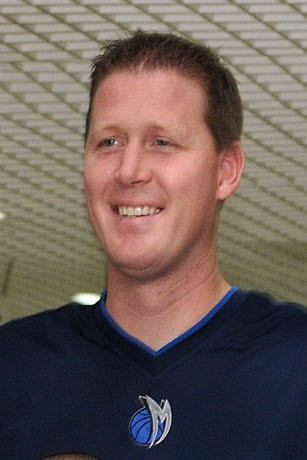
Shawn Bradley spent nine seasons with Dallas and ranks second all time in blocked shots.

The 1996–97 season was a year of transition for the Mavericks as they re-designed their entire team; 27 different players saw action for that Dallas team, setting an all-time NBA record. By the time the season was over only rookie forward, Samaki Walker, had remained from the opening-day roster. The first big move came in December, as Jason Kidd, Loren Meyer, and Tony Dumas were traded to the Phoenix Suns for guards Michael Finley and Sam Cassell and forward A.C. Green. Cassell would play just one season while Green played three, but Finley, who, after his first half-season in Dallas, went on to average over or near twenty points per game for at least the next seven years of his Mavericks career. He made two visits to the NBA All-Star Game and played in each of the Mavericks games until the 2004–05 season.

Don Nelson was hired as Dallas' general manager on February 7. Within a week of his hiring, the Mavericks had released Fred Roberts and Oliver Miller. They then traded Jamal Mashburn to the Miami Heat for forwards Kurt Thomas and Martin Müürsepp and guard Sasha Danilović. Thomas did not play in 1996–97 and only ended up playing in five games as a Maverick before signing as a free agent with the New York Knicks. Danilović played in 13 games for the Mavericks before opting out of his contract and signing with Bucker Bologna. Müürsepp played in 73 games for the Mavericks over the next two years before leaving the NBA.

Chris Gatling was the Mavericks' sole representative in the NBA All-Star Game, but he did not last much longer in Dallas. In one of the most massive two-team trades in NBA history, the Mavericks traded Gatling, Jim Jackson, Sam Cassell, George McCloud, and Eric Montross to the New Jersey Nets for 7 ft 6 in center Shawn Bradley, forward Ed O'Bannon, and guards Khalid Reeves and Robert Pack. Nelson claimed the trades were necessary because the situation in the locker room was unacceptable. However, whereas Cassell became a consistent floor leader, and Jackson, Gatling, and McCloud all continued to be substantial contributors to their teams for several more years, only Bradley lasted any time in Dallas. He would spend part of the next eight years putting up modest contributions for Dallas, including substantial numbers of blocked shots.

Undrafted rookie guard Erick Strickland averaged 10.6 ppg. Along with Finley and Bradley, he was expected to be the core of this new Mavericks team. The constant changes made it impossible to establish any team chemistry in 1996–97, and the Mavericks finished 24–58. But they had acquired some of the pieces that would help them start to turn things around in years to come. In 1997–98, despite a poor record of 20–62, Dallas had a knack for giving some of the NBA's elite teams a hard time, beating the Seattle SuperSonics, New York Knicks, Indiana Pacers, and Chicago Bulls. Against the Bulls, Dallas went on a 17–2 run to force overtime, where they won 104–97. Midway through that season, Nelson fired Cleamons and named himself head coach.

=== 1998–2019: The Dirk Nowitzki era ===
==== 1998–2001: New beginnings with Nowitzki & Nash ====
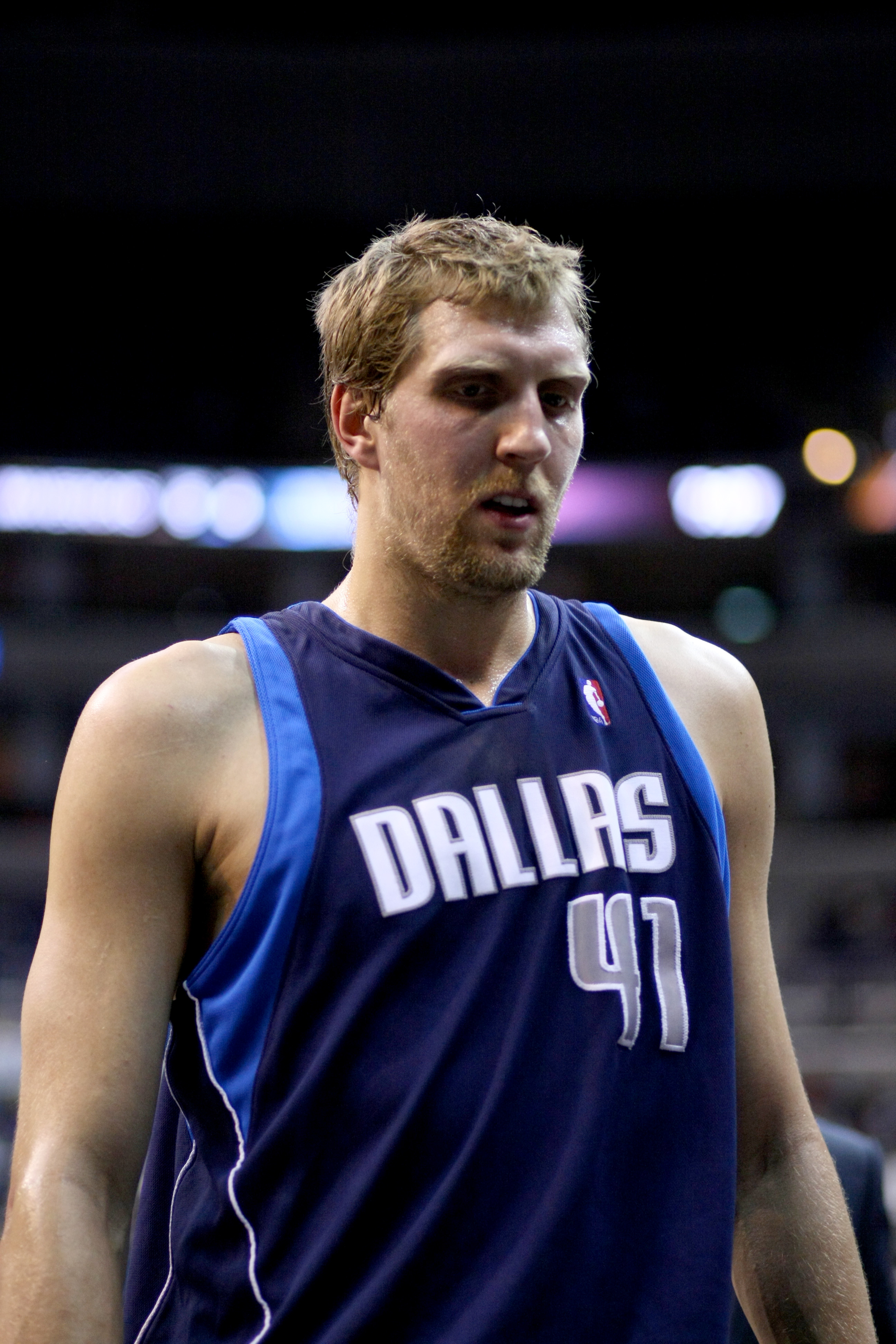
Dirk Nowitzki was acquired by the Mavericks from the Milwaukee Bucks in 1998 and would become the face of the franchise in later years.

In the lockout-shortened 1998–99 season, the Mavericks finished with a lowly 19–31 record, but Michael Finley and Gary Trent put up substantial numbers and led their team to their first winning home record (15–10) since 1989–90. Notable were the acquisitions of power forward Dirk Nowitzki and point guard Steve Nash, two seemingly unspectacular moves that would significantly impact the future. In the following season, the team finally "clicked" and started to win consistently. Led by Finley, the Mavericks earned their first 40-win season since 1989–90. He was much helped by Nowitzki, who finally "arrived" in the NBA and established himself as a potent offensive threat.

On January 14, 2000, Ross Perot's group sold the Dallas Mavericks to Internet entrepreneur and season ticket-holder Mark Cuban for $285 million. Cuban immediately set out to revitalize the Mavericks and increase the team's popularity in Dallas and nationwide. His controversial moves (he allowed Dennis Rodman to live in his house for a week before temporarily signing him) and outspoken personality quickly made him a fan favorite in Dallas. They garnered the team much press in the national media. He has also been fined millions of dollars for violating NBA rules.

In 2000–01, the Mavericks improved further and finished with a 53–29 record fueled by Nowitzki, Finley, and Nash's offensive triangle. The Mavs made a trade minutes before the trade deadline that sent Hubert Davis, Christian Laettner, Courtney Alexander, Loy Vaught, and Etan Thomas to the Washington Wizards for Juwan Howard, Calvin Booth, and Obinna Ekezie. This move brought in fresh blood that secured the club's first playoff visit in 11 years. Also, Wang Zhizhi became the first Chinese player to play in the NBA, signing with the Mavs in January, along with Eduardo Nájera, bringing Dallas an international cast that included Canada's Nash and Germany's Nowitzki. Nowitzki was named to the All NBA Third Team, becoming the first Maverick receive an All NBA honor. In the playoffs, the Mavericks won in the first round against the Utah Jazz. They advanced to the second round for the first time since 1988. Even though the San Antonio Spurs eliminated them in five games, it marked a sense of optimism for Dallas in earnestly contending for an NBA title. This season was also the last in the old Reunion Arena, before moving to the new American Airlines Center.

==== 2001–2005: Run-and-gun Nellie ball ====
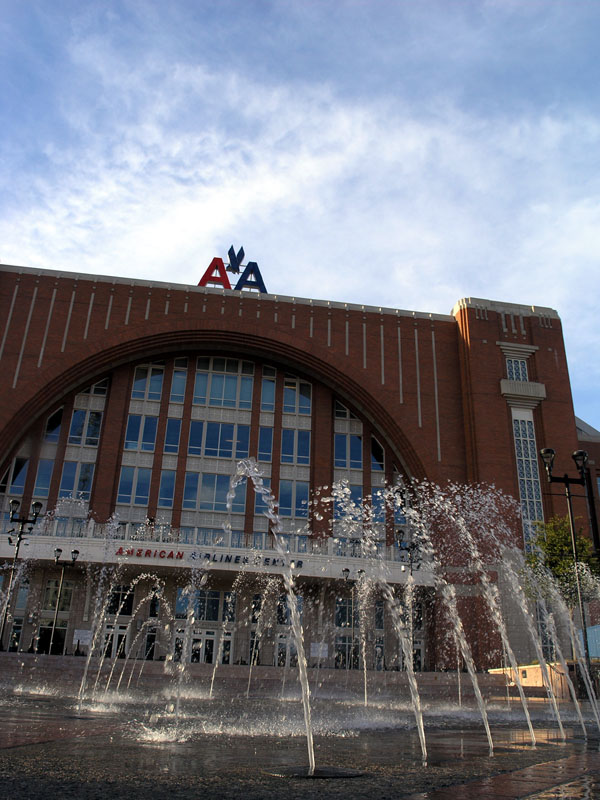
Mavericks began playing at American Airlines Center in 2001.

The 2001–02 season was an excellent season for the Mavericks, with a 57–25 record and many sellout crowds. This season also saw a change in logo and colors, changing from the cowboy hat logo and green to a new horse logo and blue, almost on the same colors of fellow Dallas-based team, the Cowboys. Also, the team gained sleeker uniforms. Another blockbuster trade sent Juwan Howard, Tim Hardaway, and Donnell Harvey to the Denver Nuggets in exchange for Raef LaFrentz, Nick Van Exel, Tariq Abdul-Wahad, and Avery Johnson. The Mavericks also made several attempts to sign the Utah Jazz's star Karl Malone. The Mavericks swept the Kevin Garnett-led Minnesota Timberwolves in the 2002 playoffs but lost again in the second round to the Chris Webber-led Sacramento Kings.

But it was only in the next season that the Mavericks finally broke through. The team started the 2002–03 season with a 14–0 record, which was one win shy of tying the NBA record set by the 1993–94 Houston Rockets (15–0). The Mavericks finished with a 60–22 record in the regular season, impressing fans and critics with their sparkling offense. Since acquiring the "Big Three" of Nowitzki, Finley, and Nash, the Mavericks were a Western Conference power in waiting. Finally, they led the team to the conference finals against the San Antonio Spurs. However, with the series tied 1–1, Dirk Nowitzki, the team's leading scorer, suffered a knee injury in game three that kept him out. This injury further worsened the Mavs' front-court depth problems (both of their backup centers were injured for the entire series), and the Spurs took the series in 6 games.

In 2003–04, two blockbuster trades were announced. The Mavericks acquired Antawn Jamison, Danny Fortson, Jiří Welsch, and Chris Mills from Golden State in exchange for Nick Van Exel, Evan Eschmeyer, Popeye Jones, Avery Johnson, and Antoine Rigaudeau. Another high-profile trade sent Raef LaFrentz, Chris Mills, and Jiří Welsch to Boston for Antoine Walker and Tony Delk. Although the team struggled with chemistry, the Mavericks comfortably qualified for the playoffs. With the trio Nowitzki-Finley-Nash and NBA Sixth Man of the Year Jamison, the Mavericks continued their reputation as the NBA's best offensive team. Notable were two rookies, Josh Howard and Marquis Daniels, who made an immediate impact. However, the Mavericks were eliminated quickly in the 2004 playoffs, losing in the first round to the Chris Webber-led Sacramento Kings, a better defensive team. The Mavericks management had to re-evaluate their strategy.

The 2004–05 season saw trades which (among others) brought in robust center Erick Dampier, combo guard Jason Terry, speedy rookie point guard Devin Harris, scoring machine Jerry Stackhouse, and defensive stalwart Alan Henderson. Although the loss of All-Star Steve Nash via free agency visibly hurt the Mavericks' offense, the new acquisitions strengthened the team defense. The run-and-gun style of former times changed into a more balanced style of play. At the All-Star break, the Mavericks acquired Keith Van Horn for Calvin Booth and Henderson, the latter resigning only days later. Nowitzki added his third consecutive Euroscar during this season as well. On March 19, longtime coach Don Nelson stepped down, and his assistant Avery Johnson succeeded him. Under Johnson's tutelage, the Mavericks' defense became more vigorous, and they quickly qualified for the 2005 playoffs with an impressive 58–24 record. The Mavericks defeated the Houston Rockets in Round 1 of the playoffs in 7 games but then lost to the Phoenix Suns 4–2, led by former Maverick star Steve Nash.

==== 2005–2006: First finals appearance ====
Before the 2005 NBA draft, the Mavericks had traded all their picks away and were left empty-handed. On August 15, 2005, veteran guard Michael Finley was waived under the new "Allan Houston Rule." Under that rule, the Orlando Magic waived Doug Christie, who then signed with the Mavericks. On August 19, the Mavericks held a press conference announcing they had re-signed Darrell Armstrong and introduced Christie, DeSagana Diop, Rawle Marshall, and Josh Powell as new Mavericks. Christie's playing time was minimal amid a surgically repaired ankle still hampering his play. He was waived on November 25, 2005. At the end of 2005, Nowitzki achieved a rare double by winning both the Euroscar and Mr. Europa, a second prestigious award for the top European player. He additionally was named the inaugural FIBA Europe Player of the Year.

Up until the very end of the season, the Mavericks were toe-to-toe with the San Antonio Spurs for the crown of the Southwest Division and the #1 spot in the Western Conference. However, they fell short of the title and had to settle for a fourth seed. Nonetheless, they once again achieved a 60–22 record, with Avery Johnson winning NBA Coach of the Year honors. They swept the Memphis Grizzlies in the 2006 playoffs, leading to a titanic series against their state rivals and the reigning NBA champions the San Antonio Spurs. Five out of the seven games were decided in the last minute, including a Game 7 that had to go into overtime, with the Mavs prevailing under the guidance of Dirk Nowitzki and an incredibly deep bench. The Mavericks were able to advance to the conference finals against former teammate Steve Nash and the Phoenix Suns. The Mavs' defense and depth enabled them to take the series as they defeated the Phoenix Suns in game 6 of the Western Conference finals on June 3, 2006, in the US Airways Center in Phoenix, and the Mavs advanced to their first NBA Finals in franchise history.

In the NBA Finals, the Mavericks faced the Miami Heat, held the home-court advantage, and scored two convincing wins. After game 2, Dallas city officials had already planned the victory parade. However, in Game 3, the Mavs blew a late double-digit lead, courtesy of Heat guard Dwyane Wade. He carried the Heat to the win, with Nowitzki missing a potentially game-tying free throw in the last seconds. After getting blown out in Game 4, the Mavericks suffered another loss in Game 5 when Wade scored the game-tying basket in the final possession of regular time, putting the Heat ahead with last-second free throws in overtime. The tragic figure was Josh Howard, who missed a pair of clutch free throws in overtime and mistakenly called an early timeout, so the Mavs had to bring in the ball at backcourt rather than half-court for the last possession. In Game 6, the Mavericks took an early double-digit lead, but again, Wade poured in 36 points, helped by Alonzo Mourning's five blocked shots, and the Mavericks lost their fourth game and the title after a string of botched three-pointers. Many Mavericks fans were stunned by the defeat. Mavericks owner Mark Cuban was fined a total of $250,000 for "several acts of misconduct" during the series, and Nowitzki was fined $5,000 for kicking a ball into the stands after Game 5. Nowitzki was also caught by TV cameras attacking a stationary bicycle in the hallway outside of the Mavericks locker room. Jerry Stackhouse was suspended for Game 5 after fouling Shaquille O'Neal on a breakaway dunk attempt. The latter marked the third time a Mavericks player was suspended in the 2006 playoffs.

The Mavericks became only the third team in NBA history (the first since 1977) to lose in the finals after taking a 2–0 lead. In Game 3, the Mavs held a 13-point lead under seven minutes remaining but were outscored 22–7 in the momentum-changing 98–96 defeat. The Heat's performance in the last seven minutes represented the team's most remarkable postseason comeback in team history.

==== 2006–2007: Nowitzki wins MVP ====
After an end to their playoff run in 2006, the Mavericks sought retribution in the new season. After a 0–4 start, the Mavericks went on a historic run and posted a 52–5 record over their next 57 games. They finished the regular season with a record of 67–15, good enough to be tied for sixth place all-time, first in the league, and the number 1 seed in the Western Conference playoffs. Dirk Nowitzki had a dominant season, further cementing his place as one of the game's elite players; he won his fifth consecutive Euroscar during the season and was named the NBA MVP at its end. Josh Howard was named to the all-star team.

However, the first-place Mavericks were defeated in six games by the eighth-seeded Golden State Warriors. This outcome is regarded as one of the biggest upsets in NBA history. The Mavs were exposed defensively, and the Warriors systematically dismantled the Mavericks by exploiting match-ups and preying on Dirk Nowitzki's weaknesses. The Mavericks went 67–12 against the rest of the league and 0–3 against Golden State on the year. The Warriors were coached by Don Nelson, the immediate past manager and coach of the Mavericks. He had been appointed head coach of the Warriors in the 2006–07 mid-season.

Nowitzki's winning of regular season MVP honors and his team's first-round exit created an awkward dilemma regarding the MVP trophy ceremony. Traditionally, MVP awards are given to the winner in a ceremony between the first and second rounds of the playoffs. It is believed that the league opted to put some distance between the MVP presentation and the Mavericks' elimination against the Warriors. By the time Nowitzki collected his MVP award, nearly two weeks had elapsed since the Mavs were ousted.

==== 2007–2008: The return of Jason Kidd ====
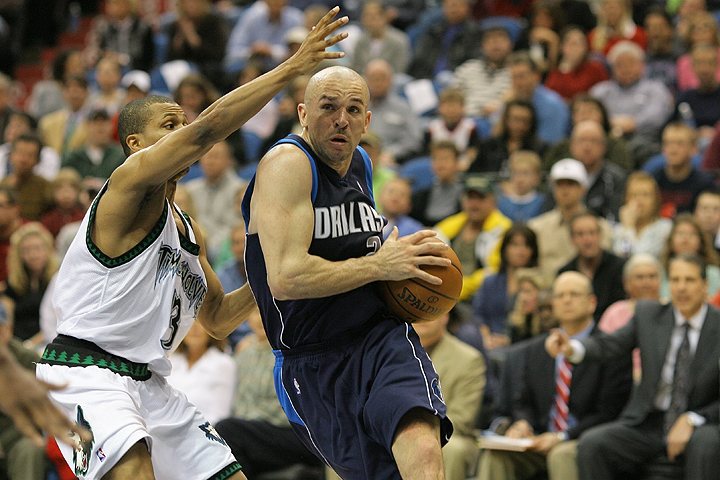
Kidd drives to the basket during a game against the Minnesota Timberwolves.

The Mavericks dealt Devin Harris, two first-round picks, and others to the New Jersey Nets for veteran all-star Jason Kidd and other role players; Cuban also tried to acquire Kevin Garnett without success. The Mavericks were 3–11 against winning teams since the trade and lost Nowitzki for a little over a week due to a high ankle sprain injury. He returned April 2 in a crucial game against the Golden State Warriors in a 111–86 Mavericks victory and helped defeat the Phoenix Suns in a 105–98 win on April 6. Dallas' win in Phoenix was especially significant because the Mavs had been nearly unable to defeat a contending team on the road the entire season. Continuing their playoff push, Dirk hit a crucial three-pointer with 0.9 seconds left, beating the Utah Jazz 97–94 on April 10. This victory guaranteed them a playoff spot and their eighth consecutive 50-win season. The Mavericks ended the season with a record of 51–31. In the first round of the playoffs, the Mavericks were eliminated by the New Orleans Hornets 4–1 on the road, 99–94.

Just one day after a disappointing season ended, Avery Johnson was dismissed as head coach of the Dallas Mavericks. On May 9, 2008, Rick Carlisle was hired as the head coach.

==== 2008–2010: Falls in the playoffs ====
After getting off to 2–7 start, the Mavericks eventually found themselves with the sixth spot in the Western Conference playoff bracket for 2009 after going 50–32 (ninth consecutive 50+-win season). About three to four weeks earlier, they were not even sure if they would make the eighth and final spot. But a run of 5–1 in their last six regular season games got them to a game over the Hornets for sixth place. Dirk Nowitzki also entered the postseason with a streak of twenty-five consecutive games of scoring 20 or more points, which was ended in the first game of the quarterfinals series versus the arch-rival, San Antonio Spurs.

The Mavericks surprised many people by winning Game 1, 106–97 in San Antonio. The Spurs quickly won game two in a rout. As the series shifted to Dallas, who had only lost one game there after the All-Star Break, won both Games 3 and 4. San Antonio was trying to win Game 5 to extend the series, but they could not do it as the Mavericks closed out the series with a 13-point-victory, 106–93. With the Victory, the Mavericks advanced to the Conference semi-finals for the first time since 2006.

They faced the two-seeded Denver Nuggets in the semi-finals, who were fresh off a 4–1 series win against the New Orleans Hornets, including a 58-point win in New Orleans. The Mavericks stayed close with the Nuggets in the first three-quarters of Games 1 and 2, but it was the fourth quarter when Carmelo Anthony and the Nuggets woke up, as they took the first two games by double-digit figures. Game 3 in Dallas was close the whole way, and Dallas led by five points with less than a minute to go. But Carmelo Anthony hit a three-pointer to give the Nuggets a 106–105 victory. The play generated quite a bit of controversy because Maverick guard Antoine Wright fouled Anthony, but since there was no replay used in the NBA in 2009, the Mavericks suffered a Game 3 loss. The league later announced that the referees made the wrong call, but despite that, the Mavericks still faced a 3–0 deficit in the series.

Nowitzki's 44 points in Game 4 saved the Mavericks season, sending the series back to Denver for a Game 5, with the series in Denver's favor, 3–1. Game 5 would prove to be the final game for the Mavericks of the 2009 season, as a score of 124–110 would oust them. The elimination led to an off-season facing many questions about the future construction of the team.

After a disappointing loss to the Nuggets in the playoffs, the Mavericks entered the off-season with many questions about the team's future construction. They began by re-signing Jason Kidd to a three-year contract extension, which took care of their pending point guard issue. The Mavericks also made a transaction to compound their age problem by trading for All-Star small forward Shawn Marion. In a three-team deal with the Grizzlies and Raptors, the Mavericks sent swingman Antoine Wright and defensive stalwart Devean George to Toronto, while aging guard Jerry Stackhouse landed in Memphis. Dallas also acquired athletic center Nathan Jawai and power forward Kris Humphries. Many analysts viewed this as a beneficial trade for the Mavericks, given that it countered their age issues while also providing them with more depth on the bench. The Mavericks also added veteran forwards Tim Thomas, Drew Gooden, and Quinton Ross.

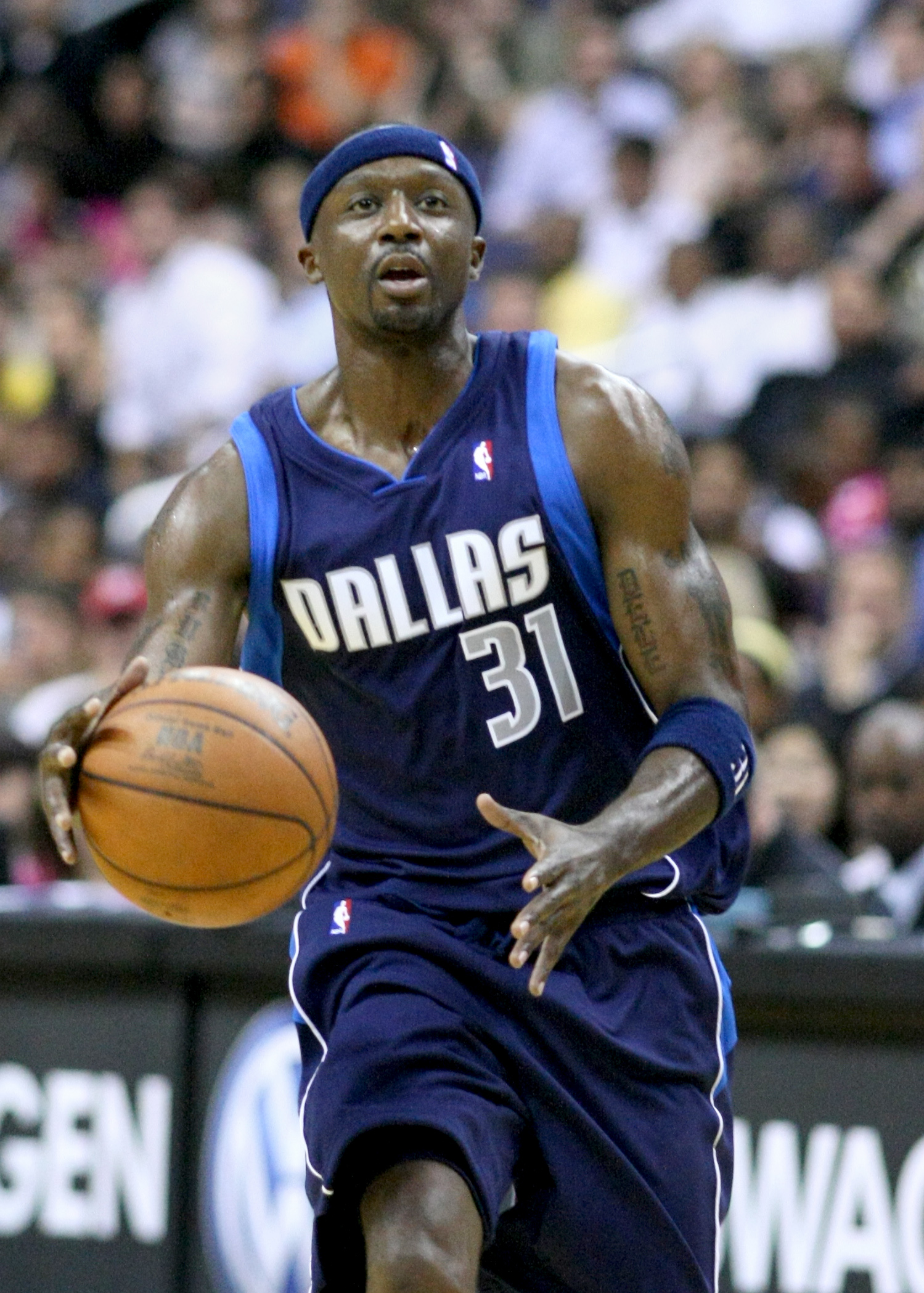
Jason Terry spent eight years with the Mavericks, playing in the teams' first two NBA Finals appearances.

These moves proved successful because after dropping the season opener to the Wizards, the Mavericks beat many contenders such as the Los Angeles Lakers, San Antonio Spurs, Houston Rockets, and the Phoenix Suns.

A day before the trade deadline, the Mavericks instigated a deal. The trade sent Josh Howard, James Singleton, and Drew Gooden to the Washington Wizards in exchange for Caron Butler, Brendan Haywood, and Deshawn Stevenson. The Mavericks felt that this trade was necessary due to Howard's declining performance and apparent unhappiness with the Mavericks organization. Some NBA analysts thought that this was a good move, because not only did it remove a disgruntled Howard from the line-up, it simultaneously brought Dirk Nowitzki a quality supporting cast. Many believed that the Mavs could contend for a title after the trade went through. The trade worked because the new-look Mavericks came out of the all-star break with a vengeance. On January 24, 2010, the Dallas Mavericks routed The New York Knicks 128–78. This win was the third-largest margin of victory in NBA history. The previous largest margin of victory for the Mavericks was 45 points. After dropping the second-half opener to the Oklahoma City Thunder, the Mavericks went on to win 13-straight games before losing to the New York Knicks. On April 10, the Mavericks clinched the Southwest division after defeating the Portland Trail Blazers 83–77. The Mavericks finished the season with a 55–27 record, good enough for the Western Conference's second seed. The Mavericks then entered the postseason with quite a bit of optimism and an assurance that they could earnestly contend for a title.

During the playoffs, though, this optimism proved to be short-lived. After winning game one 100–94, behind Nowitzki's 36-point performance, the Mavericks dropped the next three games to their in-state rivals, the San Antonio Spurs, before winning game five. Dallas would eventually lose against San Antonio in six games 97–87, leading to yet another off-season full of speculation, mostly centering on franchise player Dirk Nowitzki's pending free agent status.

==== 2010–2011: Championship season ====
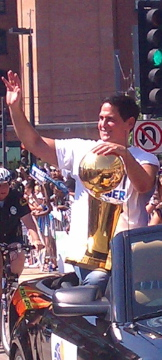
Mavericks owner Mark Cuban holding the Larry O'Brien Championship Trophy during the championship parade

After yet another first-round exit, the Mavericks began an unexpectedly early off-season. The first order of business for Mark Cuban and the Mavericks was to re-sign Dirk Nowitzki, and they did so on July 4, 2010, when the Mavericks and Nowitzki agreed to a four-year deal worth $80 million. On July 13, the Mavericks, after losing the opportunity to sign LeBron James, Dwyane Wade, or Amar'e Stoudemire, acquired centers Tyson Chandler and Alexis Ajinça from the Charlotte Bobcats for center Erick Dampier, forward Eduardo Nájera, and guard Matt Carroll. USA Today called this trade one of the most lopsided trades in NBA history, saying Chandler "was the perfect fit during his first season with the Mavericks, anchoring their defense on the way to the franchise's first championship."

The 2010–11 campaign saw the Mavericks fly out of the gate, winning 24 out of their first 29 games. However, on December 27, Dirk Nowitzki sustained a knee injury that derailed the Mavericks' momentum. The team's second-leading scorer Caron Butler suffered a season-ending knee injury himself only four nights later. The Mavericks then went on to drop seven of their next nine games, causing serious concern as to who would lead the offense in Nowitzki's absence. However, this injury would prove to only be a temporary setback because Nowitzki only missed nine games and admittedly rushed back to assist the Mavericks' reeling offense. Consequently, they quickly returned to their winning ways. The Mavericks re-invented their defensive reputation around the league during the 2010–11 campaign, mostly in part to off-season acquisition Tyson Chandler (who was later named to the All-Defensive Second Team). The Mavericks battled the San Antonio Spurs all season long for the division title, but instead settled for the third seed, with a 57–25 record. The Mavericks had a lousy reputation of struggling during the playoffs; many predicted them to be eliminated in the first round against the six-seeded Portland Trail Blazers. Yahoo! Sports analyst Adrian Wojnarowski even went so far as to predict a sweep for the Trail Blazers.

The Mavs won Games 1 and 2 on their home floor in convincing fashion. However, upon their arrival at the Rose Garden in Portland, problems began to arise. After dropping game three to Portland, the Mavericks blew a 23-point fourth-quarter lead in game four to allow Portland to tie the series at two games apiece. The whispers then began to re-surface that the Mavericks would let another impressive regular season go down the drain. The Mavericks then responded, posting back-to-back wins to oust the Blazers in six games. They then met the two-time defending champion Los Angeles Lakers in the Western Conference Semi-finals. This series would be the first and only time that Kobe Bryant met Dirk Nowitzki in a playoff series and was expected to be extremely competitive; however, it did not prove the case. The Mavericks shocked the NBA world by winning the first two games in Los Angeles, heading back to Dallas. They then won a thrilling game three in Dallas, courtesy of 32 points from Nowitzki in a 98–92 victory. The Mavericks then provided the perfect "exclamation point" crushing the Lakers in Game 4 by a final score of 122–86. In that game, Jason Terry set an NBA playoff record with nine three-pointers with just one miss, ousting the Lakers in a four-game sweep. The Mavericks then met the upstart Oklahoma City Thunder in the Western Conference finals. Dirk Nowitzki set the tone in the series in game one with a 48-point performance, with the Mavericks taking Game 1 by a score of 121–112. The Thunder then responded with 106–100 victory in Game 2. The Mavericks then won the next three games, including a 15-point comeback in Game 4, to take the five-game series. The Mavericks claimed their second Western Conference Championship in franchise history and met the team that defeated them in the 2006 NBA Finals, the Miami Heat.

The Mavericks entered the 2011 NBA Finals as underdogs, due to Miami's Big Three coming together at the start of the season. After dropping Game 1 in Miami by a score of 92–84, the Mavs needed more than just Nowitzki to score, with Nowitzki even calling out teammate Jason Terry earlier in the playoffs. In the fourth quarter of Game 2, with the Mavericks trailing 88–73, Dallas was desperate to avoid a 0–2 heading back home. Dallas then staged a comeback, going on a 22–5 run to end the game, stunned the Heat with a game two victory, and evened the series at one game apiece. After the series shifted back to Dallas, the Mavericks lost in Game 3, with Nowitzki narrowly missing the potential game-tying shot, by a final score of 88–86. Dallas yet again showed their resiliency, winning a pivotal Game 4 with Nowitzki hitting multiple big shots down the stretch to tie the series at two. Game 5 was a bit of an offensive showcase, with both teams breaking 100 points for the first time in the series. Jason Kidd and Jason Terry both hit huge shots down the stretch, and the Mavericks defeated the Heat 112–103, putting them one game from their first-ever NBA title. Three nights later, the Mavericks captured their first-ever NBA title with a 105–95 victory, completely reversing what had happened in the 2006 NBA Finals. Nowitzki scored 21, including 18 in the second half, and Terry provided 27 points off the Dallas bench. Nowitzki was so emotional after the game that he headed to the locker room before the game had concluded, and had to be coaxed back onto the floor for the NBA Championship trophy presentation. Nowitzki took home the NBA Finals MVP honors after averaging 26 points a game during the series, shedding the Mavericks label as "soft" and putting an end to the Mavericks' postseason futility.

==== 2011–2013: Post-championship struggles and later absence from playoffs ====
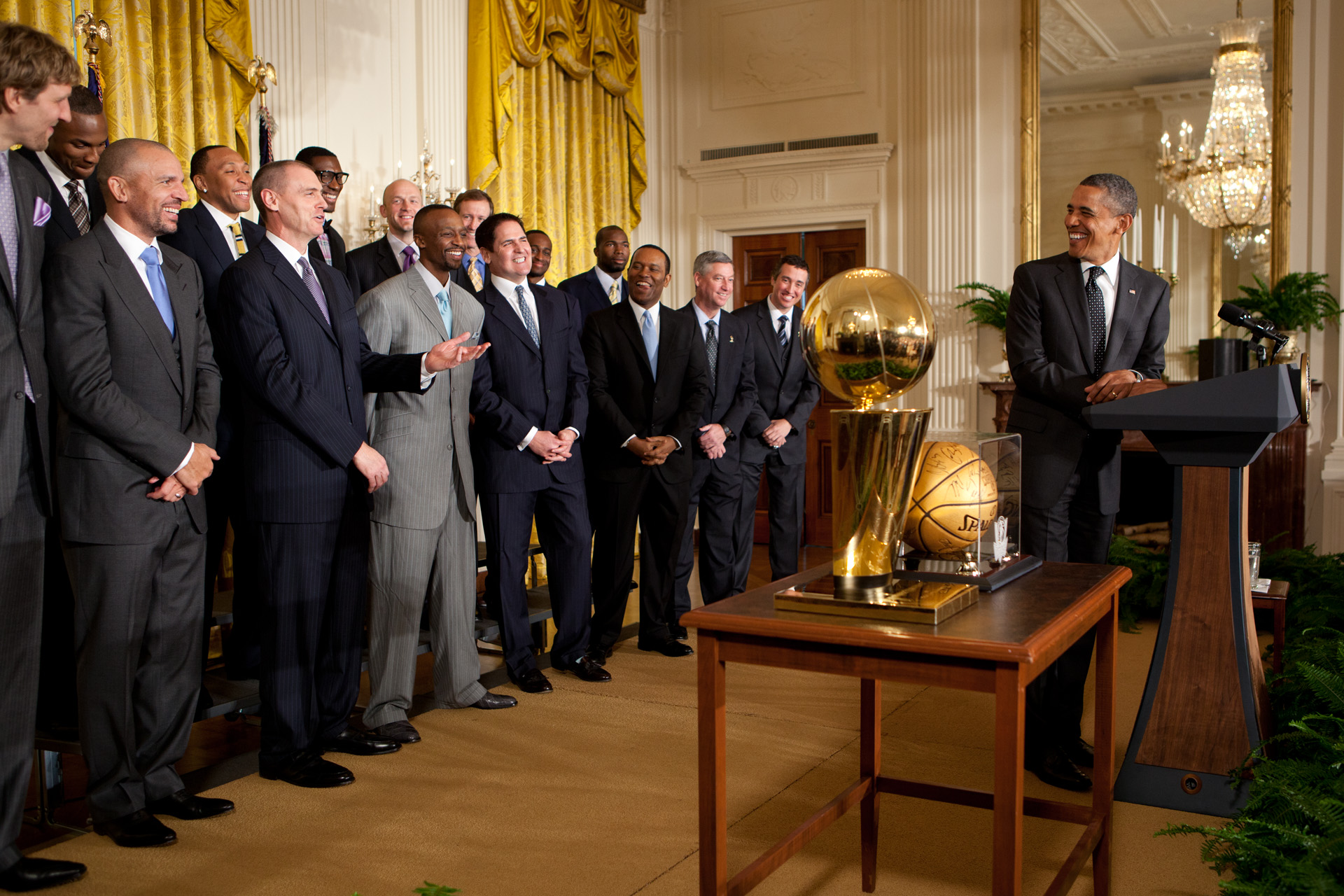
President Barack Obama welcomes the 2011 NBA Finals champions in the East Room, January 2012

The 2011–12 season was shortened to 66 games due to a lockout, which meant the Mavericks had to wait until Christmas Day to raise their first championship banner. During the brief off-season, owner Mark Cuban decided to maintain financial flexibility by letting Tyson Chandler, DeShawn Stevenson, J.J. Barea, and Caron Butler go. Chandler signed with the New York Knicks, Stevenson joined the New Jersey Nets, Barea went to the Minnesota Timberwolves, and Butler joined the Los Angeles Clippers. Meanwhile, they acquired incumbent Sixth Man of the Year Lamar Odom via a trade with the Lakers, while signing veterans Vince Carter and Delonte West.

The Mavericks raised their championship banner before their Finals rematch with the Heat on Christmas Day. Still, in what would soon become a mirror image of the 2006–07 Heat's eventual failed title defense, Miami blew them out in a 105–94 loss, marking Dallas's first regular season loss to Miami in eight seasons. Things did not get better for Dallas after starting the season 0–3, losing to the Thunder in a playoff rematch on December 29. As the calendar turned to 2012, the Mavericks won 14 of 18 games in January, but they posted a 22–22 record the rest of the way, eventually finishing seventh with a 36–30 record, their lowest finish since the 2007–08 season. Nowitzki produced 21.6 points, 6 rebounds, and 45.7% shooting, his most insufficient numbers since the 2000–01 season. Meanwhile, Odom, who proved to be a bad fit for the Mavericks, was deactivated for the final two months of the season.

In a rematch from the previous year, the Mavericks faced the Oklahoma City Thunder in the first round of the 2012 NBA playoffs. Games 1 and 2 went down to the wire, but the Mavericks fell short on both occasions as Kevin Durant made a game-winning jumper in Game 1, and late-game free throws in Game 2. Back in Dallas for Game 3, the Mavericks suffered a 95–79 defeat to fall behind 0–3. In Game 4, the Mavericks led for much of the second half, but James Harden's 15-point fourth-quarter rallied the Thunder to a 103–97 win to eliminate the defending champions. It marked the first time Dallas was swept in a seven-game series. They became the third defending champion to be swept in the first round after the aforementioned 2006–07 Heat and the 1956–57 Philadelphia Warriors.

During the 2012 off-season, the Mavericks lost both Jason Kidd and Jason Terry to free agency. Kidd signed with the New York Knicks, while Terry joined the Boston Celtics. Brendan Haywood was later amnestied before moving to the Charlotte Bobcats. The Mavericks acquired Darren Collison from the Indiana Pacers and signed O. J. Mayo from the Memphis Grizzlies. Also joining the team were former All-Stars Chris Kaman and Elton Brand.

The 2012–13 season was a struggle for the Mavericks, as Nowitzki recovered from knee surgery and missed 29 games. Also, Collison was inexperienced at the point, leading the Mavericks to sign veteran Derek Fisher for nine games, before settling on Mike James. Mayo was the team's leading scorer for the first two months of the season before Nowitzki's return saw his averages dip. Injuries also hounded Kaman and Brand. The Mavericks were 23–29 at the All-Star break, before making a late push for a playoff berth. Still, it did not save their season, and the Mavericks missed the playoffs for the first time since 2000.

==== 2013–2016: Return to the playoffs ====
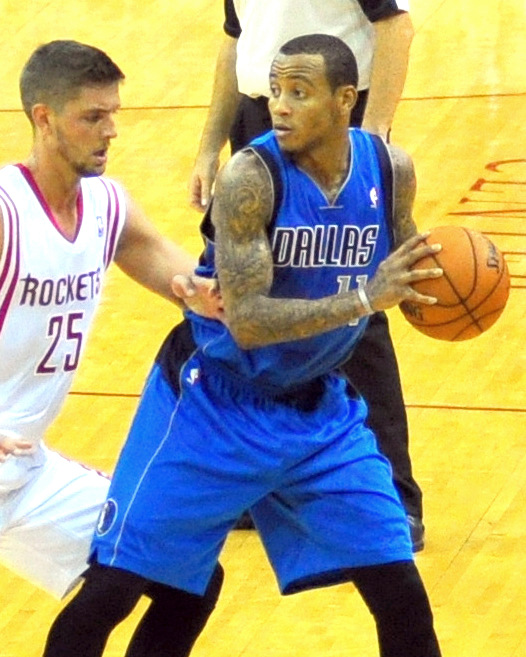
Monta Ellis (right) and Chandler Parsons (left) each spent two seasons with the Mavericks.

During the 2013 off-season, the Mavericks chose not to re-sign role players Collison, Brand, and Kaman. Mayo then declined to exercise his player option and later signed with the Milwaukee Bucks. The Mavericks signed José Calderón from the Detroit Pistons and Monta Ellis from the Bucks. They also signed veteran Samuel Dalembert.

On April 4, 2014, the Mavericks swept the season series with the Los Angeles Lakers for the first time since the 1980–81 season with a 107–95 win.

The Mavericks finished 49–33, one game ahead of Phoenix for the eighth and final playoff spot, which meant that they would once again have to face their in-state rivals, the San Antonio Spurs, the top seed in the Western Conference with a 62–20 record. In Game 1 in San Antonio, Dallas had an 81–71 lead in the fourth quarter, but the Spurs rallied back and took Game 1, 85–90. However, the Mavs forced 22 turnovers in Game 2 to rout the Spurs 113–92, splitting the first two games before the series went to Dallas. In Game 3, Manu Ginóbili hit a shot that put the Spurs up 108–106 with 1.7 seconds left, but a buzzer-beater by Vince Carter gave the Mavs the victory, putting them up 2–1 in the series. The Spurs took Game 4 in Dallas 93–89 despite a late Dallas comeback, after the Spurs at one point had a 20-point lead and later won Game 5 at home, 109–103, giving them a 3–2 series lead. The Mavs avoided elimination in Game 6 at home by rallying in the fourth quarter, winning 111–113. Game 7 was on the Spurs home court, and the Spurs beat the Mavericks 119–96, putting an end to the Mavericks' season.

In the 2014 off-season, the Mavericks made several moves, the first of which was trading for Tyson Chandler and Raymond Felton from the New York Knicks, sending Calderón, Dalembert, Shane Larkin, and Wayne Ellington as well as two-second-round draft picks, on June 26, 2014, right before the draft. Nowitzki also took a generous discount, re-signing for three years and $25 million, which helped Dallas sign restricted free agent Chandler Parsons from the Houston Rockets to a three-year contract at $46 million. Devin Harris was re-signed for four years and $16 million. Dallas brought in Richard Jefferson, Al-Farouq Aminu, Jameer Nelson, Greg Smith to build a deep bench. The Mavs' sixth man, Vince Carter, left in free agency to the Memphis Grizzlies.

On November 13, 2014, the Mavericks recorded their largest victory ever with a 123–70 win over the Philadelphia 76ers. The 53-point margin for Dallas surpassed its 50-point win over the New York Knicks in January 2010. Two days later, they scored 131 points to record their biggest point tally since 2009 in the win over the Minnesota Timberwolves.

On December 18, 2014, the Mavericks sent Jae Crowder, Jameer Nelson, Brandan Wright, a 2015 first-round pick and a 2016 second-round pick to the Boston Celtics for Rajon Rondo and Dwight Powell.

On April 28, 2015, the Mavericks were knocked out of the first round by their in-state rivals, the Houston Rockets, in a 4–1 series loss. After going down 3–0 in a Game 3 overtime, the Mavericks managed to win one on their homecourt before losing in Houston in the clinching game, 103–94. The Mavericks were the seventh seed in the playoffs and finished the season 50–32.

On April 25, 2016, the Mavericks were once again knocked out of the first round, this time, by the Oklahoma City Thunder in a 4–1 series loss. After managing to win a game at OKC and tying the series 1–1, the Mavericks lost three straight to lose the series. This series was marked by both teams' physicality, including a Kevin Durant Flagrant 2 foul and several Mavericks playing very aggressive defense on Russell Westbrook and Kevin Durant.

==== 2016–2019: Lottery return, the arrival of Luka Dončić and Dirk's final years ====
The Mavericks did not make the playoffs during the 2016–17 season, despite efforts from their newest additions, Seth Curry, Harrison Barnes, Nerlens Noel, and Yogi Ferrell. They began the season going 3–15 through their first 18 games, and could not bounce back, finishing at a 33–49 record despite fighting towards a winning record, even reaching a 28–36 record partway through the season. This season was the second time in 17 years they missed the playoffs, with the other being the 2012–2013 season. The season marked the first time the team finished with a losing record since the 1999–2000 season.

The Dallas Mavericks received the ninth pick in the 2017 NBA draft and used it to select point guard Dennis Smith Jr. out of North Carolina State. They began the 2017–18 season 3–15 through their first eighteen games as in the year prior and concluded it on a 2–12 slump to finish with a 24–58 record despite a solid rookie season from Smith Jr., who averaged 15.2 points, 3.8 rebounds, and 5.2 assists over 69 games, landing a spot on the All-Rookie Second Team. This season was the team's worst season since the 1997–98 season, in which they finished 20–62 and drafted Dirk Nowitzki afterward.

In the 2018 NBA draft, Dallas traded for Luka Dončić, who was drafted third by the Atlanta Hawks. Dallas traded their 2018 first-round pick, the fifth overall pick, and a top 5 protected 2019 first-round pick, which turned out to be the 10th overall pick. The two selections resulted in Trae Young and Cam Reddish, respectively. Head coach Rick Carlisle described Dončić as "a guy that we think is a franchise foundation piece." On July 6, 2018, long-time Los Angeles Clippers center DeAndre Jordan (who had been with the Clippers since 2008), signed a one-year deal. The Mavericks finished the season with a record of 33–49 and missed the playoffs despite Dončić winning Rookie of the Year. Nowitzki announced his retirement at season's end; his 21st season with the Mavericks marked the longest that any NBA player in history spent with a single franchise.

=== 2019–2025: The Luka Dončić era ===
==== 2019–2021: Return to playoff contention and Dončić's rise ====
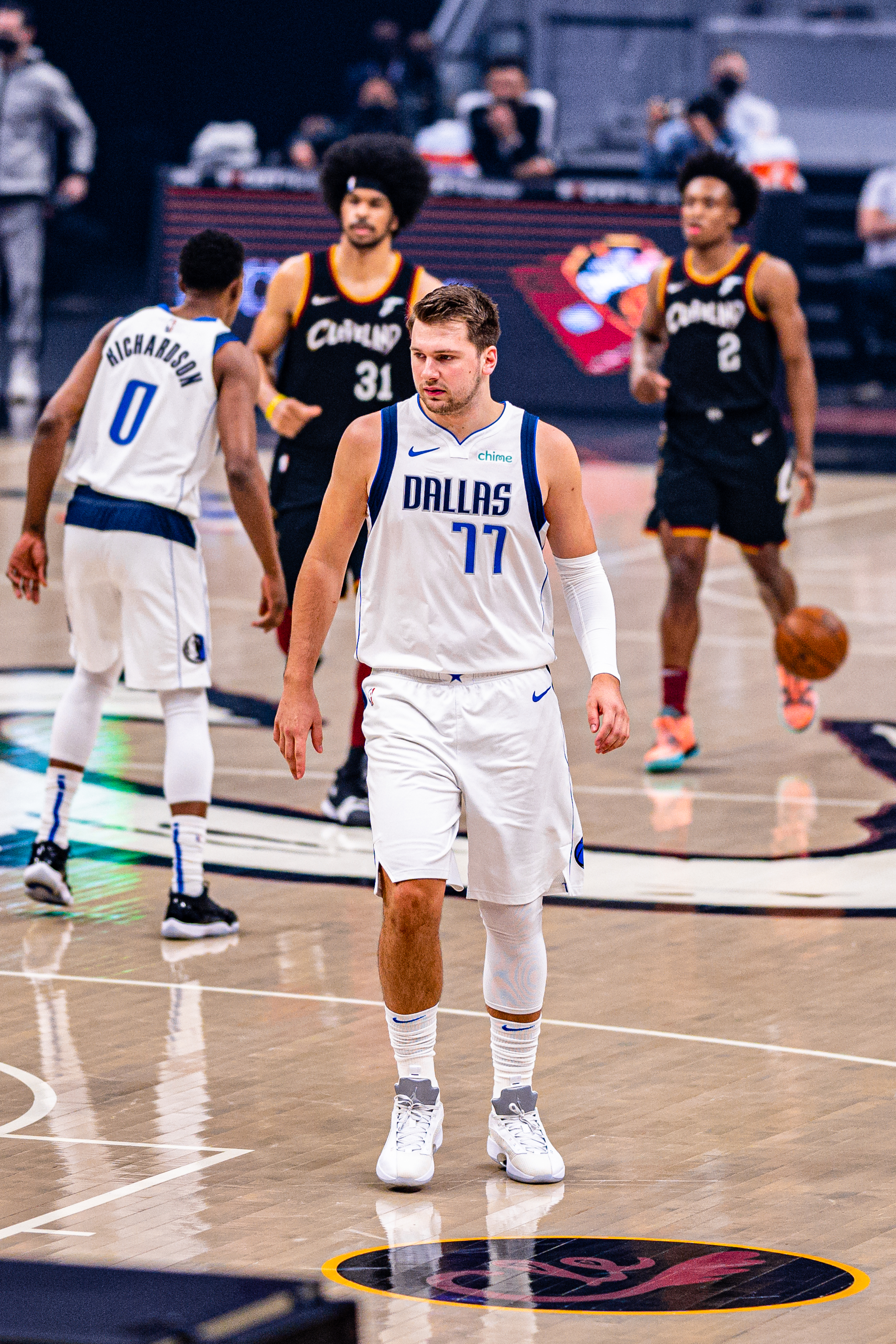
Luka Dončić in 2021

On January 31, 2019, the Mavericks sent Dennis Smith Jr., DeAndre Jordan, Wesley Matthews, and two future first-round draft picks to the New York Knicks in exchange for Kristaps Porziņģis, Tim Hardaway Jr., Courtney Lee, and Trey Burke. At the quarter-mark of the 2019–20 season, the Mavericks began with a 15–6 record through their first 21 games. With Luka Dončić averaging a near 30-point triple-double, leading the Mavericks in points, rebounds, and assists and entering MVP contention, he led the Mavericks to the top-rated offense in the league. On December 12, 2019, the Mavericks won against the Detroit Pistons in Mexico City, due to the NBA's efforts to expand internationally. During that game, Luka Dončić tallied 41 points, 12 rebounds, and 11 assists, becoming the first player in NBA history to record multiple 40-point triple-doubles before turning 21-years-old. Dončić was later selected to his first NBA All-Star Game as a Western Conference starter.

Following the suspension of the 2019–20 NBA season, the Mavericks were one of the 22 teams invited to the NBA Bubble to participate in the regular season's final eight games. They resumed play on July 31, with a 153–149 loss against the Houston Rockets. On August 2, after the Memphis Grizzlies lost against the San Antonio Spurs, the Mavericks clinched a spot in the 2020 NBA playoffs no worse than the seventh seed, marking their first trip since 2016. Dončić was announced as one of the three finalists for the NBA Most Improved Player Award. In the first round against the Los Angeles Clippers, which was the first time the two teams ever faced off in the playoffs, the Mavericks lost 4–2, despite historically great performances by Dončić. Dončić later was selected to the All-NBA First Team.

The 2020–21 season saw Dallas have players miss 41 games to COVID-19 protocols, with Maxi Kleber, Jalen Brunson, Josh Richardson and Dorian Finney-Smith missing most of those 41 games. Additionally the start of the season saw forward Kristaps Porziņģis missing the first 9 games as he recovered from off-season meniscus surgery. At one point Dallas dropped to 14th in the Western conference largely in part due to missing key pieces of their rotation. Despite this, Dallas improved on their previous season record and finished the season 42–30. The Mavericks clinched the Southwest division for the first time since the 2009–10 season following a 110–90 victory over the Cleveland Cavaliers on May 7, 2021. However the Mavericks lost in the first round to the Los Angeles Clippers for the second consecutive season in seven games.

==== 2021–2023: The 2nd return of Jason Kidd ====
Following the season on June 17, 2021, longtime head coach Rick Carlisle resigned from his position as head coach after 13 seasons.

The 2021–22 season would be the first season since 2004–05 without long-time general manager Donnie Nelson, as he announced his departure from the team on June 17, 2021, a day prior to Rick Carlisle's mutual parting with the team. Carlisle and Nelson were part of the Mavericks' 2010–11 championship squad, with Nelson being part of the 2005–06 team that made the 2006 NBA Finals.

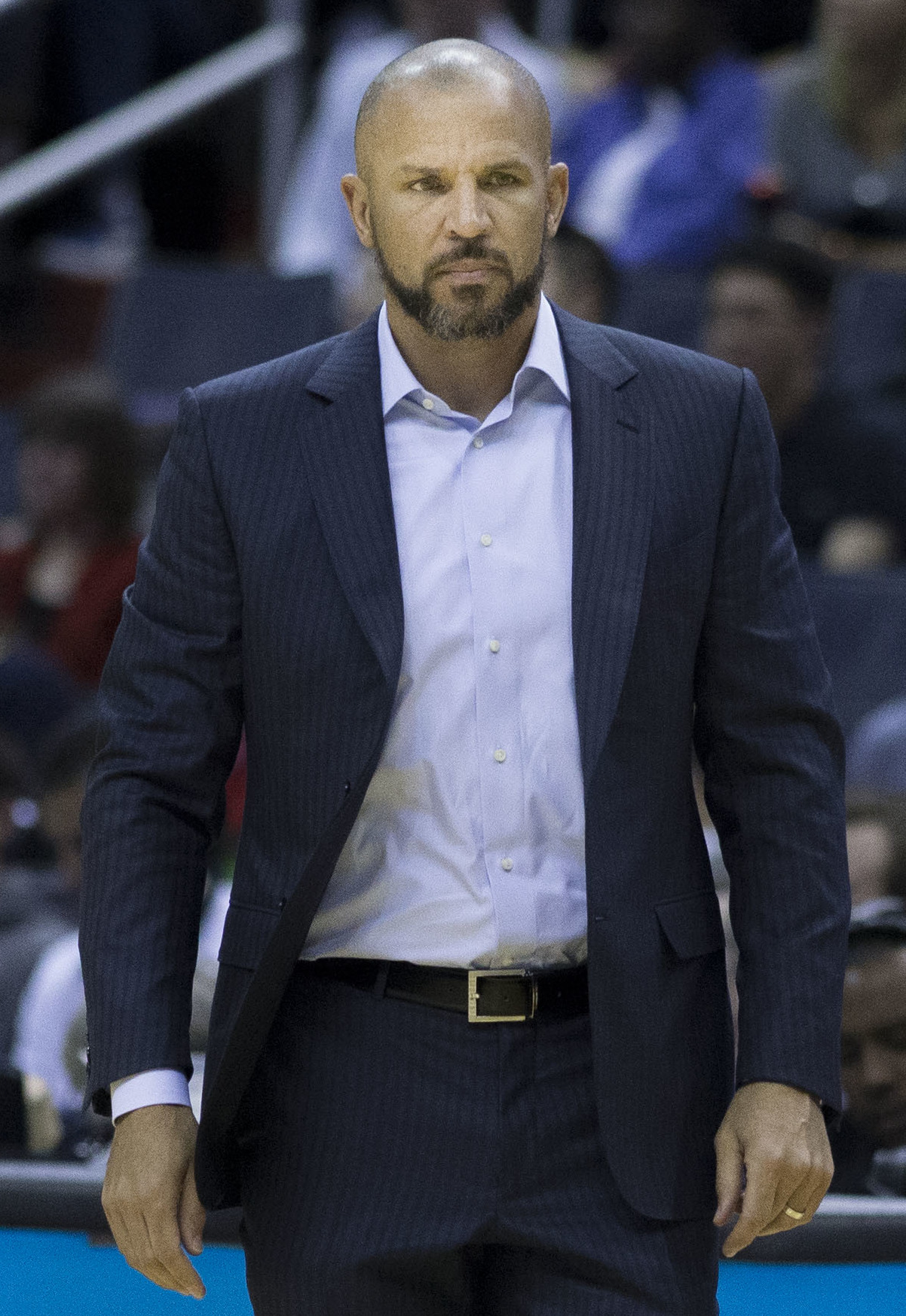
Former player Jason Kidd was hired as head coach in 2021

On June 28, 2021, Jason Kidd, a player on the 2010–11 championship team, was hired as head coach of the team. This marked the third time that Kidd was involved with the organization.

Under Kidd, the Mavericks finished the 2021–22 season with a 52–30 record, which netted them the fourth seed in the Western Conference. The Mavericks won their first playoff series since their 2011 championship season by defeating the Utah Jazz, 4–2, in the first round of the 2022 NBA playoffs. The Mavericks won two of the games with Dončić out due to injury. The Mavericks then faced the Phoenix Suns, who won a league-best 64 games in the regular season. After being down 3–2, Mavericks star Luka Dončić said, "Everybody acts tough when they're up." The Mavericks won the next two games to advance to their first Western Conference finals since 2011. In Game 7, the Mavericks beat the Suns by 33 points, and at one point they had a 46-point lead. During the 2022 Playoffs Jalen Brunson broke out as a star alongside Spencer Dinwiddie and Dončić, averaging 23 points in the first two series. In their first Western Conference finals appearance since 2011 the Mavericks would ultimately fall to the eventual NBA champion-Golden State Warriors in 5 games.

On Draft Night in the 2022 NBA draft, the Mavericks traded for center Christian Wood sending the Houston Rockets a 2022 NBA draft pick (became Wendell Moore Jr.) as well as Boban Marjanovic, Sterling Brown, Trey Burke, and Marquese Chriss. They also drafted guard Jaden Hardy with the 37th overall pick.

The Mavericks entered the 2022– 2023 season hoping to improve upon their WCF appearance, and traded for star guard Kyrie Irving at the 2023 trade deadline in exchange for Dorian Finney-Smith, Spencer Dinwiddie, a 2029 unprotected first-round draft pick and second-round picks in 2027 and 2029. However, The Mavericks failed to click and failed to make the playoffs, intentionally losing the last few games by sitting their star players in order to keep the #10 overall pick instead of having it convey to the New York Knicks, who received the draft pick in the Kristaps Porzingis trade.

After Voyager Digital, a cryptocurrency lender, filed for Chapter 11 bankruptcy protection in July 2022, Mark Cuban and the Mavericks were named in a class-action lawsuit that alleged that Voyager Digital was a Ponzi scheme the following month due to Cuban's promotion of Voyager and Voyager's sponsorship with the team. In February 2022, the U.S. 11th Circuit Court of Appeals ruled in a lawsuit against Bitconnect that the Securities Act of 1933 extends to targeted solicitation using social media.

==== 2023–2024: Return to NBA Finals ====
With the 10th overall pick in the 2023 NBA draft, the Mavericks selected Cason Wallace who they immediately traded along with Davis Bertans to the Thunder for the 12th pick, Dereck Lively II. The Mavericks also selected Olivier-Maxence Prosper with the 24th overall pick which they received through a salary dump of Richaun Holmes by the Sacramento Kings. Before the February 8, 2024, trade deadline, the Mavericks traded for P.J. Washington and two future second–round picks from the Charlotte Hornets in exchange for Seth Curry, Grant Williams, and a 2027 first–round pick that is top 2 protected. Daniel Gafford was also received from the Washington Wizards for Richaun Holmes and draft compensation.

The Mavericks finished the 2023–2024 regular season as Southwest Division champions and as the 5th seed in the West with a 50–32 record. The Mavericks would face the Los Angeles Clippers in the first round of the 2024 NBA playoffs for the third time in five seasons, however this time the Mavs would avenge previous playoff defeats to the Clippers in 2020 and 2021 by winning the series 4–2. They proceeded to then eliminate the one-seeded Oklahoma City Thunder in six games, winning the series-clinching Game 6 at home, 117–116. The win allowed the Mavericks to advance to the Western Conference Finals for the second time in three years. In the Western Conference Finals, the Mavericks defeated the Minnesota Timberwolves in five games to win their third Western Conference title in franchise history.

The Mavericks would go on to face the Boston Celtics in the 2024 NBA Finals, their first NBA Finals appearance since their 2011 victory. The Mavericks lost the series in five games. Their one win came from a 122–84 blowout, the third-largest blowout in NBA Finals history.

==== 2024–2025: Last year of Luka ====
On July 6, 2024, Klay Thompson was traded to the Mavericks in exchange for a 2025 second-round pick via a sign-and-trade. The Mavericks also traded Hardaway Jr. to the Detroit Pistons for Quentin Grimes, while also acquiring Naji Marshall, Melvin Ajinça, and Spencer Dinwiddie.

On February 1, 2025, the Mavericks sent Luka Dončić, Markieff Morris, and Maxi Kleber to the Los Angeles Lakers in a blockbuster trade for Anthony Davis, Max Christie, and a 2029 first-round draft pick. The Utah Jazz received Jalen Hood-Schifino and two second round picks to facilitate the trade. The trade was regarded as one of the most significant and unexpected in NBA history, marking the first time two reigning All-NBA players were traded for each other midseason. The Mavericks, who initiated the deal, drew heavy criticism for trading their franchise player, while Mavericks general manager Nico Harrison defended the trade, stating, "I believe that defense wins championships." Dončić on the other hand was blindsided by the trade; he was not told of it until the deal was done and according to Harrison, Dončić has severed the relationship between himself and the organization. Team governor Dumont later said the trade decision had the backing of Mavericks ownership, and emphasized his support for general manager Harrison in making "tough decisions."

The Mavericks ended their 2024–25 season in the play in against the Memphis Grizzlies. On May 12, 2025, the Mavericks won the first overall pick in the 2025 NBA draft with a less than a 2% chance of getting the pick, selecting Cooper Flagg.

== Uniforms ==
| 1980–2001 h | 1980–81 a | 1981–1992 a | 1992–2001 a | 2003–04 t | 2001–2010 a |

During their expansion season of 1980–81, the Mavericks road uniform colors were royal blue with green and white trim, but the green and blue were reversed a year later, and green was the dominant road uniform color through 1992. However, in the 1992–93 season, they went back to their original road uniform scheme from their expansion season, with minor alterations to the "Dallas" script, a design that the Mavericks used until 2001. From 1980 to 2001, the home white uniforms had "Mavericks" in blue, with green and white trim, with a few minor alterations to the "Mavericks" script during the 1990s. The 1980s green road jerseys were revived in the 2004–05 season as part of the Mavericks' 25th anniversary. However, while the lettering from the 1980s uniform was present, the number scheme resembled the 1993–2001 uniforms. The green uniforms would be revived again in the 2015–16 season, still with the 1990s number scheme. The aforementioned uniforms were brought back for the 2020–21 and 2025–26 seasons as part of Nike's "Classic" set, this time with the proper number scheme.

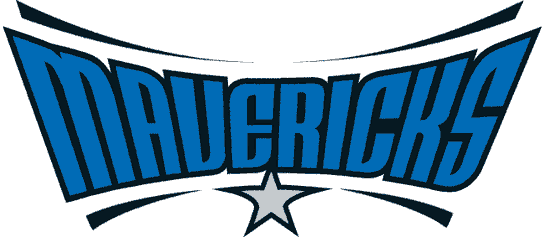
The Dallas Mavericks' wordmark logo

In the 2001–02 NBA season, the Mavericks drastically updated their logos and uniforms, with a new Dallas Cowboys-inspired color scheme of midnight blue, royal blue and silver. The new uniforms consist of a "Dallas" script on both the home and road jerseys. On the home jersey, "Dallas" is in midnight blue across the chest and the numbers are in royal blue with silver trim, while on the road jersey, "Dallas" is in white, with the numbers in silver and white trim.

In the 2003–04 NBA season, the Mavericks debuted their shiny silver alternate uniforms, with "Mavericks" in white and royal blue trim, with blue numerals. However, it proved to be unpopular with fans (thus derisively nicknamed the 'Trash Bags'), and it was scrapped after just one game (at Lakers on October 28, 2003).

In the 2004–05 NBA season, the Mavericks introduced an alternate green uniform similar to their 1980s road uniforms. They were designed by rapper Sean "P. Diddy" Combs, and featured "Mavs" in white on the front side of the jersey with blue trim, and the numbers in silver with white trim above the script on the left chest.

On September 21, 2009, the Mavericks unveiled a new alternate royal blue uniform with the same "Mavs" script, replacing the green uniform. The said uniform will also be used for the NBA's Noche Latina promotion, with the wordmark "Los Mavs.".

On August 19, 2010, the Mavericks unveiled yet another change to their uniform set, with a new royal blue road uniform that displays the "Dallas" script in navy blue with silver numbers, both with white trim. The alternate royal blue uniform was retired as a result and this new uniform has replaced the midnight blue one as the main road uniform. However the 'Los Mavs' uniforms were still in use despite the change, but would be the last time the Mavericks participated in the 'Noche Latina' uniform events.

On December 13, 2011, during media day, the Mavericks unveiled an alternate uniform based on the last alternate uniform they wore in the 2009–10 season, except that the base color is navy blue and the number is positioned below the team nickname 'Mavs' rather than above, effectively reversing roles.

On September 23, 2014, the Mavericks unveiled a new navy alternate uniform, featuring a depiction of the Dallas skyline in silver with white trim. The uniform was selected among thousands of entries as part of a design-a-uniform contest the Mavericks initiated during the 2013–14 season, but was not worn until the 2015–16 season.

With the switch to Nike as the uniform supplier in 2017, the home and away uniform designations were eliminated. In its place are the "Icon" uniforms, "Association" uniforms, "Statement" uniforms and "City" uniforms. The Mavericks' white uniforms are part of the "Association" set, the royal blue uniforms are identified with the "Icon" set, and the navy blue uniforms are included in the "Statement" set.

For the "City" set, the Mavericks wore black uniforms with "DAL" and the numbers in royal blue with neon green trim (a nod to the original Mavericks' colors). This set was worn only during the 2017–18 season, after which a new "City" uniform would be designed. The new "City" uniform was unveiled in November 2018. The "DAL" across the chest was replaced with the team's secondary logo and the neon green trim was removed, with the numbers no longer having a trim color. The "City" uniform for the 2019–20 season featured a stylized "MAVS" wordmark inspired from graffiti paintings. The uniform base had a light blue/navy blue gradient and neon green trim. The "City" uniform for 2020–21 featured a white base with gold and silver trim, which was said to be inspired by Pegasus, a Dallas symbol. The Pegasus-themed "City" uniform returned in the 2025–26 season, but used the Mavericks' current color scheme. The original Pegasus uniform was brought back the following season.

Prior to the 2019–20 season, the Mavericks drastically redesigned their navy "Statement" uniforms, eliminating the Dallas skyline and reverting to the full team name "Mavericks" in front. The uniform contains white lettering and white and royal blue side stripes. In 2022, the uniform was tweaked to again feature just "Mavs" in front and the numbers moving to the left chest, along with thick black side stripes.

During the 2021–22 season, in commemoration of the NBA's 75th anniversary, the Mavericks wore "City" uniforms featuring various elements taken from past uniforms. The template used is from their current uniforms, but with green striping. The typography resembled the Mavericks' uniforms from 1980 to 2001, and featured a modified version of the cowboy hat logo (except the "M" was replaced with a "D"). A recolored version of the current horse logo appears on the shorts, and the skyline silhouette from their 2015–2019 navy alternates is placed on the beltline.

The 2022–23 "City" uniform featured retro-style white letters with green trim on a blue base, which was a nod to the late 1970s–early 1980s disco era that served as a boom period within the Dallas–Fort Worth metroplex.

For the 2023–24 "City" uniform, the Mavericks partnered with Grammy Award-winning recording artist Leon Bridges in designing the uniform. The black-based uniform with stylized Western letters in silver and blue trim pay homage to 150 years of American rhythm and blues history. This uniform, albeit in white with silver letters, was reused for their 2024–25 "City" uniform.

== Head coaches ==
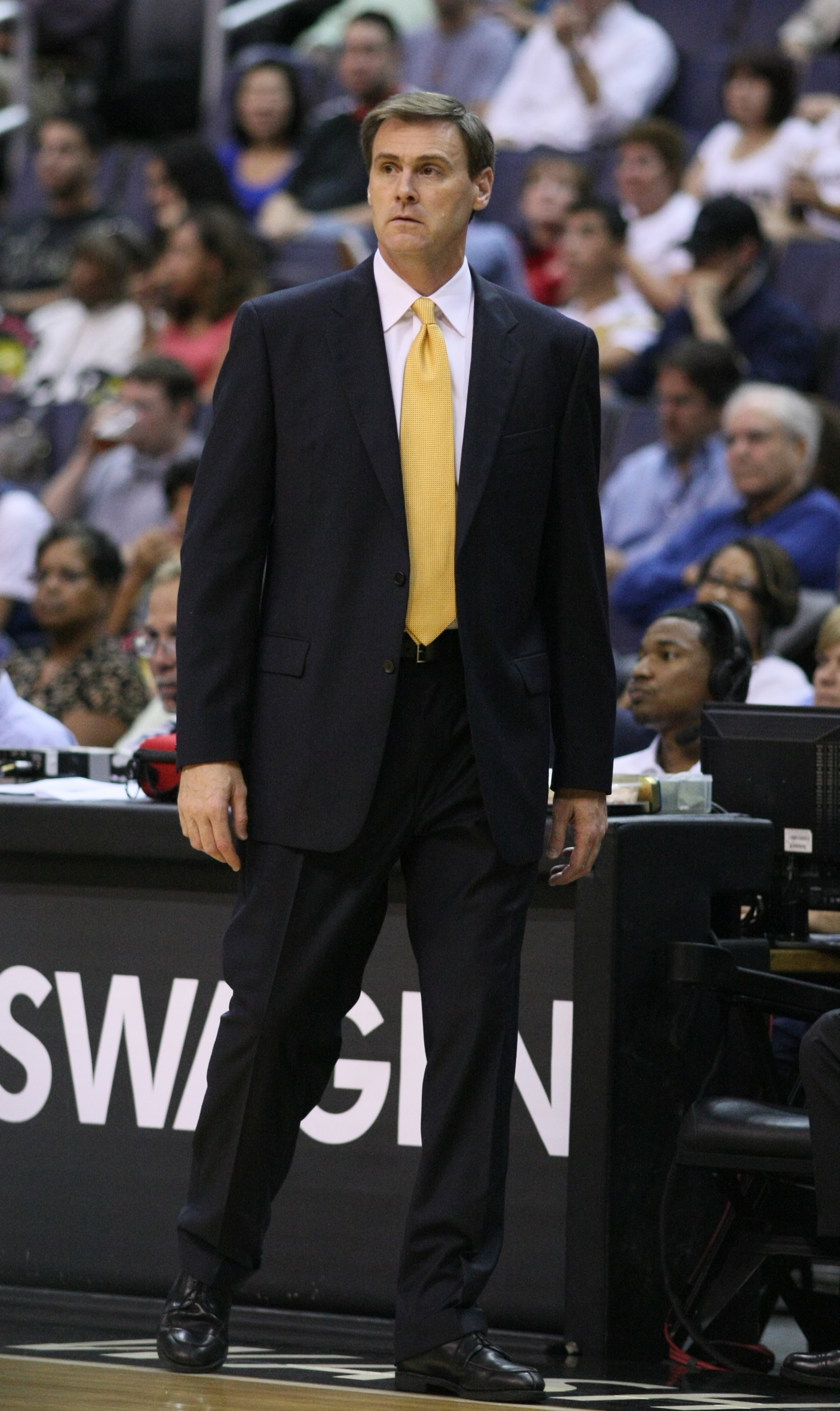
Rick Carlisle, head coach from 2008 to 2021

There have been nine head coaches for the Mavericks franchise. The franchise's first head coach was Dick Motta, who served for two non-consecutive stints and coached for nine seasons with the Mavericks. Motta is the franchise's all-time leader for the most regular season games coached (738); Don Nelson, Donnie Nelson's father, is the franchise's all-time leader for the most regular season game wins (339); Avery Johnson is the franchise's all-time leader for the most playoff games coached (47), the most playoff-game wins (23), and the highest winning percentage in the regular season (.735). Nelson is also named one of the top 10 coaches in NBA history. Johnson was the first coach to win the Western Conference championship, losing the 2006 NBA Finals to the Miami Heat. Johnson is also the only Mavericks coach to have won the NBA Coach of the Year Award, having won it in the 2005–06 season. Quinn Buckner and Jim Cleamons have spent their entire NBA coaching careers with the Mavericks. Only one of the Mavericks coaches, Don Nelson, has been elected into the Basketball Hall of Fame as a coach. Rick Carlisle was the head coach of the Mavericks from 2008 to 2021. Carlisle led the team to their first championship in franchise history in 2011, against their 2006 Finals opponent, the Miami Heat, in a rematch. In 2015, he passed Motta as the winningest coach in franchise history. Jason Kidd was hired on June 28, 2021, and in 2022 led the Mavericks to the team's first playoff series win since the 2011 championship season that he won as a player. Two seasons later in the 2023-24 season he led the Mavericks to an NBA Finals appearance against the Boston Celtics, in which the Mavericks lost in 5 games. On May 19, 2026, Kidd was fired shortly after the appointment of the team's new president Masai Ujiri.

== Rivalries ==
=== Miami Heat ===
The Mavericks-Heat rivalry is a testament to when the two teams faced each other in the NBA finals on two occasions. First they came head to head in the 2006 NBA Finals, in which the two teams captured their first respective conference titles. The Mavericks came into the series 60–22 with a strong group of players while the Miami Heat came in with a respectable 52–30 record and sported an aging but still strong Shaquille O'Neal as well as an up-and-coming Dwyane Wade. Dallas was favored by many in the media to win the series. The Dallas Mavericks won the first two games but Miami went on to sweep the next four and win the NBA championship for the first time in team history.

Both teams saw success over the next few seasons and appeared in the playoffs multiple times, and would ultimately go on to have a rematch in the 2011 NBA Finals. It was also the first time that either team had reached the Finals since 2006. This time, however, Miami was favored to win after the highly publicized signings of LeBron James and Chris Bosh to their roster. Dallas came in with a 57–25 record while the Heat came in 58–24. Miami won the first game 92–84, but Dallas went on to win four of the next five and upset the Heat to win the first title in franchise history.

=== San Antonio Spurs ===
The Mavericks-Spurs rivalry is relatively new but very fierce. It features two teams with Dallas roots—the Spurs began their life in the ABA as the Dallas Chaparrals and did not move to San Antonio until 1973. On October 11, 1980, the Mavericks made their NBA debut by defeating the Spurs 103–92. The teams have met numerous times in the playoffs, with the Spurs defeating the Mavericks in 2001, 2003, 2010, and 2014, while the Mavericks defeated the Spurs in 2006 and 2009. The Spurs have won five championships and six conference titles, while the Mavericks have won one championship and three conference titles. The Spurs have won 15 division titles, while the Mavericks have won 5. Both the Spurs and the Mavericks have 3 60-win seasons. This is known as the "I-35 rivalry" because both cities lie on Interstate 35.

The two teams met in the playoffs during the 2000–2001 season with the Spurs winning in five games. Little was made during this series, as the Spurs won their first NBA championship only two years before. The Mavericks, run by a trio of Steve Nash, Michael Finley, and Dirk Nowitzki, had just defeated the Utah Jazz despite not having home-court advantage and were only starting to meld into a title contender.

The two teams met again in 2003 in the Western Conference finals. Both the Spurs and the Mavericks had 60-win seasons and reached the Western Conference finals after defeating the Los Angeles Lakers and the Sacramento Kings, respectively. Despite having the best season of their history, the Mavericks fell in six games to the Spurs.

The rivalry took on a new meaning in 2005 when, near the end of the regular season, Don Nelson would resign as head coach of the Mavericks, apparently satisfied with the state of the team, and hand the coaching reins to former Spur Avery Johnson, the point guard of the 1999 NBA champion Spurs team who hit the game-winning shot against the New York Knicks. Since Johnson was coached under Spurs' head coach Gregg Popovich, he would be familiar with most, if not all, of Popovich's coaching style and philosophy. During the 2005 off-season, Michael Finley, waived by the Mavericks under the amnesty clause, joined the Spurs in search for the elusive title.

During the 2006 playoffs the two rivals met again. San Antonio won the first game at home 87–85. The Mavericks got revenge the next game, winning 113–91 and evening the series up at 1–1. The Mavericks then won a dramatic Game 3 by a single point, 104–103. Though Manu Ginóbili could have made a game-winning basket with five seconds on the clock, he committed an error, allowing the ball to bounce away from him with one second remaining. Dallas won a tightly contested Game 4 123–118 in overtime. The Spurs proceeded to avoid elimination by taking Game 5. In the final seconds of the game, Jason Terry was seen punching former teammate Michael Finley under the belt, leading to his suspension for Game 6. He was sorely missed as the Spurs won, taking the series back home for a Game 7. In the crucial Game 7, with 2.6 seconds to go, Nowitzki converted a three-point play to force overtime. Manu Ginóbili, who fouled Dirk on the play, had just given San Antonio their first lead one possession earlier. Tim Duncan, who had played in all 48 minutes of regulation, was too fatigued to carry his team in overtime. The Mavericks, meanwhile, were set to take control of the game and they did just that, winning 119–111. The Mavericks went on to the Conference Finals where they defeated the Suns in six games, but succumbed to the champion Heat in the NBA Finals.

Despite much anticipation of a renewed meeting in the 2007 Western Conference finals, the Mavericks lost to the Golden State Warriors in one of the greatest upsets in NBA history. The Spurs won the NBA finals after beating the Cleveland Cavaliers 4–0. The eighth seed Warriors, who made the playoffs on the last game of the NBA season, defeated the 67-win, first-seed Mavericks in six games. Meanwhile, the Spurs would ultimately go on to win the 2007 NBA Championship, establishing themselves as a true NBA dynasty. The season also gave longtime former Maverick Michael Finley his first championship. Many Spurs teammates claimed that the drive to win this season was partially to give Finley his first championship, especially since Finley had lost a bitter-fought series to his longtime team the year previous.

Worth noting in a regular season meeting between the two rivals in April 2007, a game that the Spurs won 91–86, Tim Duncan suffered his first career ejection for supposedly laughing while sitting on the bench. Joey Crawford, the referee who ejected Duncan, allegedly asked Duncan to a fight which led to the longtime ref's season-ending suspension. As Duncan was heading into the locker room, American Airlines Center erupted into a huge cheer, applauding Duncan's ejection. The game saw chippy play, with Jerry Stackhouse and Manu Ginóbili getting into an altercation after a rebound.

In the 2009 NBA playoffs, the Mavericks and Spurs squared off again in the first round. The Spurs and Mavericks split the first two games in San Antonio, but Dallas defeated the Spurs in games 3 and 4, both in Dallas. The Mavericks then went on to close out the series and eliminated the Spurs at the AT&T Center in San Antonio.

In 2010, the Dallas Mavericks matched up against the San Antonio Spurs in the first round of the Western Conference Playoffs. Although the Mavericks managed to obtain the number two seed, they were defeated by the Spurs in six games.

During the 2011 playoffs, a role reversal of sorts occurred between the two rivals, when the top-seeded Spurs were defeated by the eighth-seeded Memphis Grizzlies, the first time an eight-seed defeated a one-seed since the Mavericks-Warriors series of 2007. In addition, the Mavericks defeated the LeBron James-led Miami Heat in the NBA Finals.

The Mavericks were swept in the 2012–13 season by the Spurs for the first time since the 1997–98 season, Tim Duncan's rookie season. In their last match-up of the season, San Antonio escaped with a 92–91 victory over Dallas when a Vince Carter 3-point attempt bounced off the rim at the buzzer. With the win, the Spurs clinched a playoff spot for the 16th straight season, currently the longest streak in the NBA. San Antonio also reached 50 wins for the 14th straight season, the longest streak in NBA history.

In the 2013–14 season, the Spurs once again swept the Mavericks in the regular season, giving them nine straight victories. In addition, an overtime loss to the Memphis Grizzlies on April 16, 2014, ensured that the Mavericks would face the Spurs once again in the 2014 NBA playoffs, where the Mavericks were the eighth seed and San Antonio the first. In Game 1 in San Antonio, the game was relatively close. Dallas reached an 81–71 lead in the fourth quarter, but the Spurs rallied back and took Game 1 at home, 90–85. However, the Mavericks managed to force 22 turnovers in Game 2 to rout the Spurs 113–92, splitting the first two games before the series went to Dallas. In Game 3, Manu Ginóbili managed to hit a shot that put the Spurs up 108–106 with 1.7 left, but a buzzer-beater by Vince Carter gave the Mavs the victory, putting them up 2–1 in the series. The Spurs took Game 4 in Dallas 93–89 and later Game 5 at home 109–103, giving them a 3–2 lead. The Mavericks won Game 6 at home by 113–111. The Spurs won game 7 119–96, eliminating the Mavericks in the first round.

=== Phoenix Suns ===
During the 2004 off-season, former Dallas Mavericks point guard Steve Nash signed a free-agent deal with the 29–53 Phoenix Suns to help out their offense. The addition of Nash completely turned the team around, as Phoenix rolled to a 62–20 record and the best record in the NBA. The teams met in the 2005 Western Conference Semifinals with Phoenix having the home-court advantage.

Phoenix won game 1 127–102 with a 40-point game by Amar'e Stoudemire. Steve Nash was also given his NBA MVP award during that game, a game in which he terrorized his former team. However, Mavericks star Dirk Nowitzki hit a game-winning turn-around jumper in game 2 to beat Phoenix 108–106 to send the series back to Dallas tied 1–1. Phoenix and Dallas split the two games in Dallas which saw the winners of both games score 119 points. The series went back to Phoenix, where the Suns defeated the Mavericks 114–108 in the America West Arena (now Footprint Center). Then, in game 6, with Dallas facing elimination, Phoenix beat Dallas in a thriller which saw Steve Nash with a 39-point game, to go along with 12 assists. In the Western Conference finals, Phoenix lost to the San Antonio Spurs, who then went on to win the NBA title.

The following year, the Suns were without Stoudemire (who was injured), Joe Johnson, and Quentin Richardson, but with a core of new players led by Raja Bell (who clotheslined Lakers star Kobe Bryant in a first-round series game), Boris Diaw and Tim Thomas to go along with Nash and fellow All-Star Shawn Marion. Phoenix had to play seven-game series against the two Los Angeles teams, the Los Angeles Lakers (who had a 3–1 lead against Phoenix) and the resurgent Los Angeles Clippers. In the Western Conference finals, they faced a Mavericks team who won 60 games, but were forced to be the fourth seed since the division winners got the top three seeds. On their way to the Western Conference finals, Dallas swept the Memphis Grizzlies, and beat in-state rival San Antonio Spurs in seven tense games. Phoenix won game 1 121–118 after Diaw hit a game-winning shot in the dying seconds of the fourth quarter. Bell, though injured himself in game 1, missing Games Two and Three. After that, Dallas took control of the series, winning Games Two and Three by the scores of 105–98 and 95–88. Bell came back for game 4 and led Phoenix to a 106–86 win. Dallas however, beat Phoenix 117–101 in game 5 which included a 50-point performance from Dirk Nowitzki, and eliminated the Suns in Phoenix 102–93 in game 6. Dallas would later lose to the Miami Heat in six games, despite winning the first two games.

On March 14, 2007, in Dallas, Phoenix beat Dallas in a 129–127 double-overtime thriller. With the Mavericks up by 7 with a minute left in regulation, Dirk Nowitzki (a 90% free throw shooter) missed two free throws. Steve Nash fed off his mistakes and scored 10 straight points including the game-tying three-pointer with 3 seconds left to go. Dirk Nowitzki's potential game-winning shot bounced off the rim and sent the game to overtime. Jason Terry sent the game into another overtime with a game-tying three-pointer of his own. Dirk Nowitzki's potential game-tying shot in double overtime went in and out of the rim as Amar'e Stoudemire's 41 points were too much for Dallas to handle.

On April 10, 2013, the Mavericks' 12-season playoff streak, since 2001, ended in a loss to the Suns 102–91.

On April 12, 2014, the Mavs handed the Suns one of three straight losses to keep them out of the playoffs, 101–98. Their other two losses were to the San Antonio Spurs and Memphis Grizzlies.

From the 2016–17 season through the 2021–22 regular season, the Suns dominated the rivalry, winning 17 out of 21 head-to-head games, including separate winning streaks of nine and seven games.

The Mavericks and the Suns met again in the 2022 Western Conference Semifinals, in which the Suns were coming off a historic franchise-record 64 wins, while the Mavericks compiled 52 regular season wins. Despite the Suns being heavily favored to win and going up 2–0 in the series, the Suns' season ended in an upset 123–90 game 7 loss to the Mavericks on their home floor.

=== Houston Rockets ===
An NBA intrastate rivalry, both in Texas linked by I-45, as well as both Dallas and Houston fans traditionally having a disdain for each other's city, the rivalry started when the Mavericks were the last Texas team to join the NBA. This is also known as the I-45 rivalry because they both lie on Interstate 45. In the Mavericks' inaugural season in 1980–81, the Rockets won all six meetings including a 116–68 win. In the playoffs, the Mavericks defeated the Rockets in the 1988 and 2005 playoffs, the latter of which was plagued with allegations of game-fixing, while the Rockets swept several season series with the Mavericks during the 1990s, and also during the Rockets' championship years. On April 11, 1995, the Mavericks defeated the Rockets 156–147 in double overtime, making that win one of their most memorable victories against Houston who were the reigning champions. Two years later, the Rockets and Mavericks have clashed in their first-ever regular season game played in Mexico City, which was won by the Rockets 108–106. In the 2010s, the rivalry has once again flourished with Dallas owner Mark Cuban and Rockets general manager Daryl Morey taking shots at each other on social media, as well as Houston fan-favorite Chandler Parsons signing an offer sheet to leave the Rockets to sign with the rival Mavericks for $46 million, while making negative statements about the city of Houston upon leaving, causing massive backlash among Rockets fans. Finally, longtime Mavericks' player Jason Terry, who was a starter on the Mavericks' 2011 championship team, joined the Rockets for the 2014–15 season, and both teams met in the first round of the 2015 NBA playoffs, with the Rockets as the second seed and Mavericks the seventh seed, and the Rockets got the best of them 4–1.

=== Los Angeles Lakers ===
The rivalry between the Lakers and Mavericks began in the 1980s during the Lakers' Showtime era. In the 1984 NBA playoffs, the Lakers won over the Mavericks in the Western Conference Semi-finals with the series 4–1. In 1986, they met again in the semi-finals and the Lakers won the series 4–2. In the 1988 NBA playoffs, the Lakers, who were the defending champions, defeated the Mavericks in a seven-game series in the Western Conference finals and eventually became the back-to-back champions after winning the NBA Finals. In 2011, the Mavericks met the two-time defending champions Lakers in the semi-finals and rejected their three-peat by sweeping them in four games and eventually won the NBA Finals. In Game 2 of the 2011 NBA playoffs, Ron Artest was ejected for hitting J. J. Barea and suspended for Game 3. In Game 4, Lamar Odom was ejected for pushing Dirk Nowitzki and then Andrew Bynum was ejected for elbowing J. J. Barea. Both players received flagrant foul 2. After the 2011 NBA lockout, Lamar Odom was sent to the Mavericks after he requested to leave the Lakers due to the vetoed Chris Paul trade. Andrew Bynum made a formal apology for what he did to Barea before the start of the following season.

In a shocking February 2025 three-team blockbuster trade, the Los Angeles Lakers acquired Luka Dončić, Maxi Kleber, and Markieff Morris from the Dallas Mavericks. In return, the Mavericks received Anthony Davis, Max Christie, and a 2029 first-round pick, aiming to shift their strategy toward a defense-focused, "win-now" approach.

=== Oklahoma City Thunder ===
The rivalry between the Dallas Mavericks and the Oklahoma City Thunder has developed through multiple Western Conference matchups since the early 2010s. First meeting in a postseason series during the 2011 NBA Playoffs, the teams have continued to draw attention in the 2020s as both teams feature prominent, well-known players. The teams, separated by roughly 200 miles, have developed intense, high-stakes matchups, with the Thunder holding a narrow advantage in their all-time regular-season series.

== Season-by-season record ==
List of the last five seasons completed by the Mavericks. For the full season-by-season history, see List of Dallas Mavericks seasons.

Note: GP = Games played, W = Wins, L = Losses, W–L% = Winning percentage

| Season | GP | W | L | W–L% | Finish | Playoffs |
| 2021–22 | 82 | 52 | 30 | .634 | 2nd, Southwest | Lost in conference finals, 1–4 (Warriors) |
| 2022–23 | 82 | 38 | 44 | .463 | 3rd, Southwest | Did not qualify |
| 2023–24 | 82 | 50 | 32 | .610 | 1st, Southwest | Lost in NBA Finals, 1–4 (Celtics) |
| 2024–25 | 82 | 39 | 43 | .476 | 3rd, Southwest | Did not qualify |
| 2025–26 | 82 | 26 | 56 | .317 | 4th, Southwest | Did not qualify |

== Home arenas ==
- Reunion Arena (1980–2001)
- American Airlines Center (2001–present)

== Personnel ==
=== Current roster ===
Dallas Mavericks roster
Players

| Pos. | No. | Player | Height | Weight | DOB | From |
|---|---|---|---|---|---|---|
| F/C | 34 | Santi Aldama | 7 ft 0 in (2.13 m) | 215 lb (98 kg) | 2001-01-10 | Loyola (MD) |
| F | 13 | Tarik Biberović | 6 ft 7 in (2.01 m) | 218 lb (99 kg) | 2001-01-28 | Bosnia and Herzegovina |
| G | 0 | Max Christie | 6 ft 5 in (1.96 m) | 190 lb (86 kg) | 2003-02-10 | Michigan State |
| C | 30 | Moussa Cissé | 6 ft 11 in (2.11 m) | 220 lb (100 kg) | 2002-09-10 | Memphis |
| G | 1 | Walter Clayton Jr. (TW) | 6 ft 3 in (1.91 m) | 195 lb (88 kg) | 2003-03-06 | Florida |
| G | 55 | Sergio de Larrea | 6 ft 6 in (1.98 m) | 175 lb (79 kg) | 2005-12-04 | Spain |
| F | 32 | Cooper Flagg | 6 ft 10 in (2.08 m) | 205 lb (93 kg) | 2006-12-21 | Duke |
| F/C | 21 | Daniel Gafford | 6 ft 10 in (2.08 m) | 265 lb (120 kg) | 1998-10-01 | Arkansas |
| G | 9 | Jett Howard (TW) | 6 ft 8 in (2.03 m) | 215 lb (98 kg) | 2003-09-14 | Michigan |
| G | 11 | Kyrie Irving | 6 ft 2 in (1.88 m) | 195 lb (88 kg) | 1992-03-23 | Duke |
| G | 14 | Morez Johnson Jr. | 6 ft 10 in (2.08 m) | 250 lb (113 kg) | 2006-01-25 | Michigan |
| F | 33 | Tobi Lawal (TW) | 6 ft 7 in (2.01 m) | 215 lb (98 kg) | 2003-05-01 | Virginia Tech |
| C | 2 | Dereck Lively II (injured) | 7 ft 1 in (2.16 m) | 230 lb (104 kg) | 2004-02-12 | Duke |
| F | 3 | Naji Marshall | 6 ft 6 in (1.98 m) | 220 lb (100 kg) | 1998-01-24 | Xavier |
| F | 16 | Caleb Martin | 6 ft 5 in (1.96 m) | 205 lb (93 kg) | 1995-09-28 | Nevada |
| F | 10 | Zaccharie Risacher | 6 ft 8 in (2.03 m) | 200 lb (91 kg) | 2005-04-08 | France |
| G | 8 | Marcus Sasser | 6 ft 2 in (1.88 m) | 195 lb (88 kg) | 2000-09-21 | Houston |
| F | 25 | P. J. Washington | 6 ft 6 in (1.98 m) | 230 lb (104 kg) | 1998-08-23 | Kentucky |

Coaches
Head coach
- Dusty May
Assistant(s)
- Joe Boylan
- Rob Fodor
- Willie Green
- Sam Hershberger
- Mody Maor
- Garrett Temple
- Drew Williamson

Legend
- (DP) Unsigned draft pick
- (FA) Free agent
- (S) Suspended
- (GL) On assignment to G League affiliate
- (TW) Two-way affiliate player
- Injured

Roster
Updated: October 21, 2026

=== Retained draft rights ===
The Mavericks hold the draft rights to the following unsigned draft picks who have been playing outside the NBA. A drafted player, either an international draftee or a college draftee who is not signed by the team that drafted him, is allowed to sign with any non-NBA teams. In this case, the team retains the player's draft rights in the NBA until one year after the player's contract with the non-NBA team ends. This list includes draft rights that were acquired from trades with other teams.

| Draft | Round | Pick | Player | Pos. | Nationality | Current team | Note(s) | Ref |
|---|---|---|---|---|---|---|---|---|
| 2024 | 2 | 51 | Melvin Ajinça | F | France | LDLC ASVEL (France) | Acquired from the New York Knicks | |

=== Retired numbers ===
Dallas Mavericks retired numbers
| No. | Player | Position | Tenure | Date |
| 12 | Derek Harper | G | 1983–1994; 1996–1997 | January 7, 2018 |
| 15 | Brad Davis | G | 1980–1992 | November 14, 1992 |
| 22 | Rolando Blackman | G | 1981–1992 | March 11, 2004 |
| 24 | Mark Aguirre | F/G | 1981–1989 | January 29, 2026 |
| 41 | Dirk Nowitzki | F/C | 1998–2019 | January 5, 2022 |

- The NBA retired Bill Russell's No. 6 for all its member teams on August 11, 2022.
- The most recent Maverick retired jersey was the retirement of Mark Aguirre's No. 24 jersey, which was done on January 29, 2026.

=== Basketball Hall of Famers ===
Dallas Mavericks Hall of Famers
Players
| No. | Name | Position | Tenure | Inducted |
|---|---|---|---|---|
| 2 | Alex English | F | 1990–1991 | 1997 |
| 4 | Adrian Dantley | F/G | 1989–1990 | 2008 |
| 70 | Dennis Rodman | F | 2000 | 2011 |
| 2; 5 | Jason Kidd | G | 1994–1996; 2008–2012 | 2018 |
| 13 | Steve Nash | G | 1998–2004 | 2018 |
| 10 | Tim Hardaway | G | 2001–2002 | 2022 |
| 41 | Dirk Nowitzki | F/C | 1998–2019 | 2023 |
| 25 | Vince Carter | G/F | 2011–2014 | 2024 |
| 1 | Amar'e Stoudemire | F/C | 2015 | 2026 |
Coaches
| Name | | Position | Tenure | Inducted |
| Don Nelson | | Head coach | 1997–2005 | 2012 |
Contributors
| Name | | Position | Tenure | Inducted |
| Rick Welts | | Executive | 2024–present | 2018 |
| Del Harris | | Assistant coach | 2000–2007 | 2022 |

=== FIBA Hall of Famers ===
Dallas Mavericks Hall of Famers
Players
| No. | Name | Position | Tenure | Inducted |
|---|---|---|---|---|
| 17 | Antoine Rigaudeau | G | 2003 | 2015 |
| 13 | Steve Nash | G | 1998–2004 | 2020 |
| 32 | Detlef Schrempf | F | 1985–1989 | 2021 |
| 16 | Peja Stojaković | F | 2011 | 2024 |
| 6 | Andrew Bogut | C | 2016–2017 | 2025 |
| 16 | Wang Zhizhi | C | 2001–2002 | 2026 |
| 41 | Dirk Nowitzki | F/C | 1998–2019 | 2026 |

=== Individual awards ===
NBA Most Valuable Player

- Dirk Nowitzki – 2007

NBA Finals Most Valuable Player

- Dirk Nowitzki – 2011

NBA Western Conference finals MVP

- Luka Dončić – 2024

NBA Rookie of the Year

- Jason Kidd – 1995
- Luka Dončić – 2019
- Cooper Flagg – 2026

NBA Coach of the Year

- Avery Johnson – 2006

NBA Sixth Man of the Year

- Roy Tarpley – 1988
- Antawn Jamison – 2004
- Jason Terry – 2009

NBA Sportsmanship Award

- Jason Kidd − 2012

Twyman–Stokes Teammate of the Year

- Dirk Nowitzki – 2017

J. Walter Kennedy Citizenship Award

- J. J. Barea − 2018

Kareem Abdul-Jabbar Social Justice Champion Award

- Reggie Bullock − 2022

All-NBA First Team

- Dirk Nowitzki – 2005, 2006, 2007, 2009
- Luka Dončić – 2020, 2021, 2022, 2023, 2024

All-NBA Second Team

- Dirk Nowitzki – 2002, 2003, 2008, 2010, 2011

All-NBA Third Team

- Dirk Nowitzki – 2001, 2004, 2012
- Steve Nash – 2002, 2003

NBA All-Defensive Second Team

- Derek Harper – 1987, 1990
- Tyson Chandler – 2011

NBA All-Rookie First Team

- Jay Vincent – 1982
- Sam Perkins – 1984
- Roy Tarpley – 1987
- Jamal Mashburn – 1994
- Jason Kidd – 1995
- Luka Dončić – 2019
- Cooper Flagg – 2026

NBA All-Rookie Second Team

- Josh Howard – 2004
- Marquis Daniels – 2004
- Yogi Ferrell – 2017
- Dennis Smith Jr. – 2018
- Dereck Lively II – 2024

NBA All-Star Three-Point Shootout

- Dirk Nowitzki – 2006

Best NBA Player ESPY Award

- Dirk Nowitzki − 2011
- Luka Doncic − 2024

=== NBA All-Star selections ===
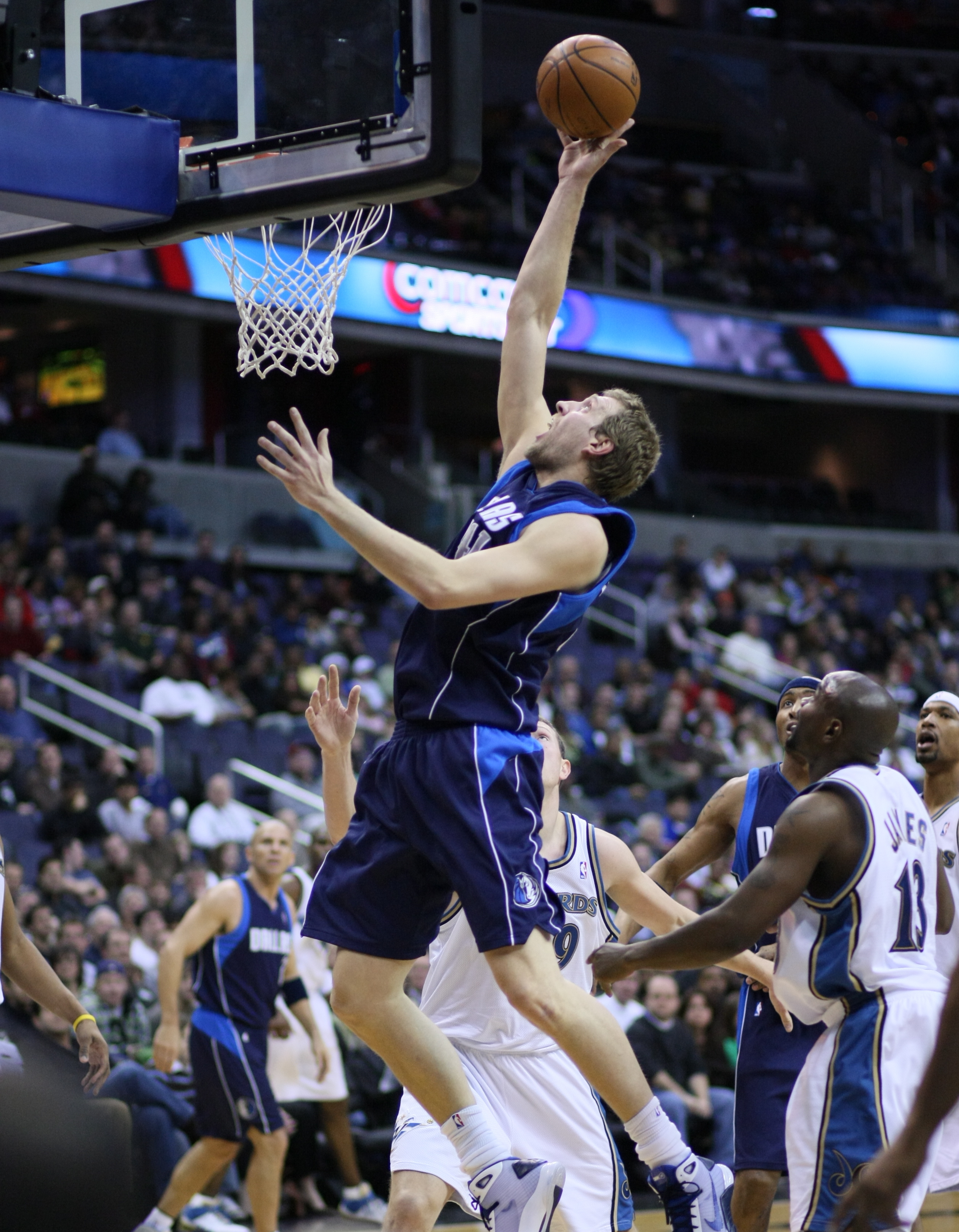
Dirk Nowitzki was selected for the NBA All-Star team 14 times.

The following Mavericks players were selected to the NBA All-Star Game.

- Mark Aguirre – 1984, 1987, 1988
- Rolando Blackman – 1985, 1986, 1987, 1990
- James Donaldson – 1988
- Jason Kidd – 1996, 2010
- Chris Gatling – 1997
- Michael Finley – 2000, 2001
- Steve Nash – 2002, 2003
- Dirk Nowitzki – 2002–2012, 2014, 2015, 2019
- Josh Howard – 2007
- Luka Dončić – 2020–2024
- Kyrie Irving - 2023, 2025
- Anthony Davis - 2025

List of NBA All-Star Game head coaches

- Don Nelson – 2002
- Avery Johnson – 2006

== Ownership and management ==
Donald Carter purchased the Dallas Mavericks for $12 million in 1980. Developer Ross Perot Jr. and car dealer David McDavid purchased a 67% interest in the Mavericks from Carter on May 1, 1996, valuing the team at $125 million. Carter and other limited partners kept a 33% stake. After the sale, head coach Dick Motta was removed from his role but remained an advisor. Perot beat out a similar bid by businessman Tom Hicks, who had purchased the Dallas Stars in January 1996. According to the New York Daily News, Carter wanted to sell the team because he didn't want to fire his friend Dick Motta.

Mark Cuban purchased a majority stake in the Mavericks for $285 million from Ross Perot Jr. in 2000.

On December 27, 2023, casino magnates Miriam Adelson and Patrick Dumont acquired a 69% majority stake in the team at a franchise valuation of between $3.8 billion and $3.9 billion. Cuban retained 27% ownership and operational oversight of the team. Dumont replaced Cuban as the team's governor on the NBA Board of Governors, and the Adelson and Dumont families would have final say over all business and basketball decisions. Adelson funded the purchase by selling $2 billion of stock in Las Vegas Sands Corporation and with additional cash on hand. As part of the purchase, four minority shareholders were bought out, except for Mary Stanton who kept her 4% stake in the franchise.

Cuban's nearly 23-year tenure as owner and governor was the longest and most successful in team history. During the Cuban era, the Mavericks' record was 1,152–782, with 18 playoff berths, and the 2011 NBA championship.

=== Terdema Ussery ===
Terdema Ussery served as team president and CEO from 1997 until 2015. During this time Ussery also served in other roles, including president of the Dallas Mavericks Foundation and an alternate governor for the Mavericks on the NBA Board of Governors. Ussery left the Mavericks for a position with Under Armour.

=== Sexual assault and domestic violence allegations ===
In February 2018, Sports Illustrated released an investigation with sexual assault allegations against Ussery and domestic violence allegations against another employee, Earl K. Sneed. Cuban said he had not been aware of improper behavior from Ussery or Sneed. The organization hired a pair of independent investigators to look into the allegations. The Mavericks also hired former AT&T executive Cynthia Marshall as their interim CEO in a direct response to the allegations. Marshall was the first black female CEO of an NBA franchise as well as the first woman ever to hold the position.

Mark Cuban responded in March 2018 to separate allegations against him of a 2011 sexual assault; in an email to the Associated Press, he stated, "It didn't happen."

On September 19, 2018, the team's investigation report concluded that there were "numerous instances of sexual harassment and other improper workplace conduct" that had occurred within the organization, none of which were related to the allegation against Cuban himself. Cuban also agreed to donate $10 million in reparations to organizations related to women's causes, mainly those committed to combating domestic violence and supporting the professional development of women within the sports industry.

On October 5, 2018, over two weeks after the team publicly released their sexual harassment report, it was reported that team photographer Danny Bollinger made propositions to four now-former employees over the course of a decade. Bollinger was laid off by Cuban four days later.

| Preceded by Los Angeles Lakers | NBA champions 2010–11 | Succeeded by Miami Heat |
