= Patrick Dumont =

American businessman

- Born: Patrick Sydney Dumont
- Education: Johns Hopkins University (BSE); Columbia University (MBA)
- Occupation: Businessman
- Spouse: Sivan Ochshorn (m. 2009)

Patrick Sydney Dumont is an American businessman and owner of the Dallas Mavericks of the National Basketball Association.

After his 2009 marriage to Sivan Ochshorn, daughter of Miriam Adelson, Dumont began working for the Adelson-owned Las Vegas Sands Corp. He was promoted to Chief Financial Officer (CFO) in 2016, President and Chief Operating Officer (COO) in 2021, and Chief Executive Officer (CEO) and Chairman in 2026.

In 2023, the Adelson-Dumont family purchased the majority controlling interest in the Mavericks, with Dumont becoming the team's governor, replacing Mark Cuban. In his role as governor, Dumont is a significant decision-maker for the team.

== Early life and career ==
Dumont grew up in Flatbush, Brooklyn, New York. He attended Saint Ann’s School in Brooklyn Heights. He earned a bachelor's degree in mechanical engineering from Johns Hopkins University and an MBA from Columbia Business School in 2003.

== Business career ==
Dumont worked briefly in consulting and aerospace before attending Columbia Business School. Dumont's early career was in investment banking. He worked at Miller Buckfire and Bear Stearns.

=== Las Vegas Sands ===
Dumont joined Las Vegas Sands Corp., owned by Sheldon Adelson and his family, in June 2010. He served in a variety of strategic, operating, and finance positions, rising to senior vice president before being named the company's CFO in March 2016.

After the death of Sheldon Adelson on January 11, 2021, Dumont was promoted to President and COO.

As COO, Dumont was responsible for overseeing Singapore and Macau operations, which included negotiating with those territories' governments regarding Sands' multi-billion dollar property investments. During the Covid-19 Pandemic, Dumont was responsible for the overhaul of the Sands Cotai Central, which was rebranded as the Londoner Macao. Dumont also oversaw the continued expansion of Marina Bay Sands, which is located in Singapore.

In late 2024, Dumont played a pivotal role in thawing relations between the NBA and China, which frayed following Houston Rockets General Manager Daryl Morey tweeting in support of the 2019–2020 Hong Kong protests. Dumont announced the NBA China Games, which were held at the Venetian Arena in Macao in October 2025.

In 2026, Dumont was promoted to CEO and Chairman.

=== Dallas Mavericks ===
The NBA Board of Governors unanimously approved the sale of the controlling ownership interest of the Dallas Mavericks to Miriam Adelson and Sivan and Patrick Dumont on December 27, 2023. Dumont became the Mavericks' governor and representative to the NBA Board of Governors. The Adelson-Dumont families took 69% ownership and previous controlling owner Mark Cuban's share was reduced to 27%.

According to the Dallas Morning News, the Adelson-Dumont family's purchase of the Dallas Mavericks was the realization of a decade-long passion to buy an NBA franchise. Long-term, Dumont expressed the potential to develop destination resorts in Texas, including the opportunity to build a new arena for the Mavericks as part of a large-scale entertainment complex in a destination resort.

Dumont was the "ultimate decision maker" of the widely criticized blockbuster trade of star Luka Dončić to the Los Angeles Lakers on February 1, 2025, according to Mavericks general manager Nico Harrison.

Dumont also stated there were no plans to relocate the team away from Dallas. The following season, the Mavericks won the first pick in the 2025 NBA draft lottery and selected Cooper Flagg, a Duke University alum.

On November 11, 2025, Dumont fired general manager Nico Harrison after ongoing fan unrest and a struggling 3–8 start to the season, with fans chanting "Fire Nico" at Dallas Mavericks home games in the American Airlines Center.

He then penned an open letter to Mavericks fans regarding the firing of Harrison, stating that he was "fully committed to the success of the Mavericks."

The night before the firing, Dumont had a courtside conversation with a Mavericks fan wearing a Lakers Luka Dončić jersey, during which he accepted the fan’s apology for a rude gesture the fan had directed toward Dumont during a previous game and acknowledged remorse about the team’s decision to trade Dončić.

On May 4, 2026, the Dumont-led Mavericks hired Masai Ujiri as their president and alternate governor. On May 8, 2026, the Mavericks hired Mike Schmitz as their general manager to replace the embattled Nico Harrison.

On October 29, 2025, Dumont and the Mavericks became involved in an ongoing lawsuit against the Dallas Stars over shared use of the American Airlines Center. The Mavericks claimed that the Stars breached their lease agreements by moving their headquarters to Frisco, Texas in 2003. The Stars, in their countersuit, claimed that the Mavericks had breached their lease agreements by moving their headquarters to Las Vegas, Nevada in 2024. In May 2026, a Texas judge ruled in favor of the Mavericks and gave control of the American Airlines Center to the team.

== Personal life ==
Dumont married Sivan Ochshorn, who he met at Columbia Business School and is Miriam Adelson's second daughter from her first marriage, in 2009.

== See also ==
- List of NBA team owners

Sporting positions
| Preceded by Mark Cuban | Dallas Mavericks principal owner 2023–present Served alongside: Miriam Adelson | Incumbent |
