= Donnie Nelson =

American basketball executive (born 1962)

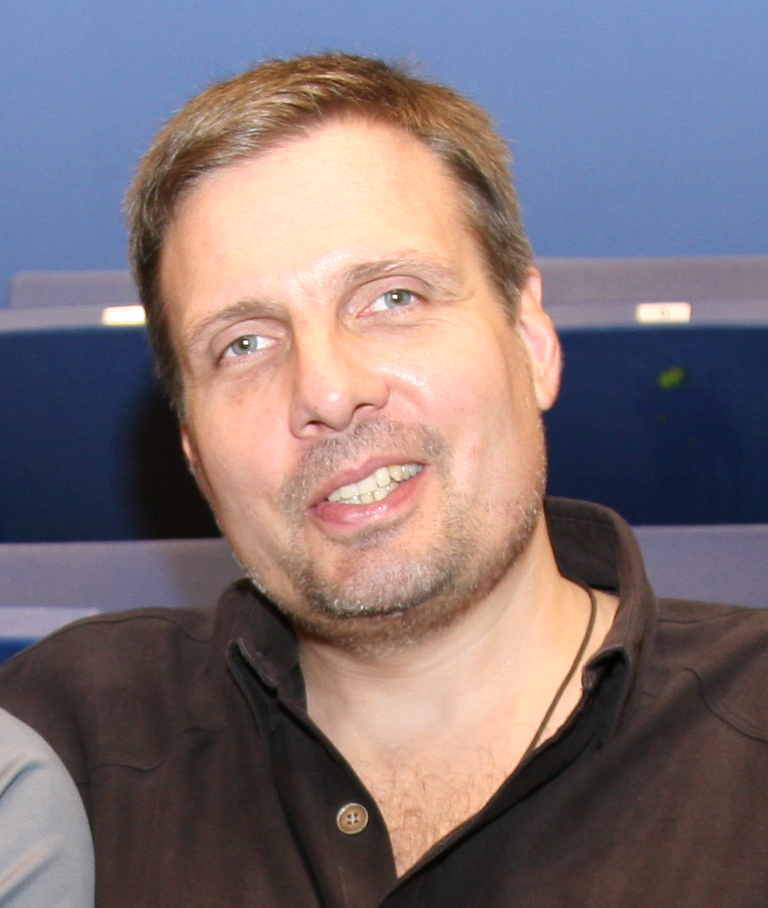
- Nelson in 2007

BC Roma
- Position: President
- League: LBA; EuroCup

Personal information
- Born: September 10, 1962 (age 64) Iowa City, Iowa, U.S.

Career information
- High school: Worcester Academy (Worcester, Massachusetts)
- College: Wheaton (1982–1986)
- Coaching career: 1986–2002

Career history

Coaching
- 1986–1994: Golden State Warriors (assistant)
- 1995–1998: Phoenix Suns (assistant)
- 2000–2002: Dallas Mavericks (assistant)

Career highlights
- As executive: NBA champion (2011)
Medals
Men's basketball
Assistant coach for Lithuania
Olympic Games
Bronze medal – third place	1992 Barcelona
Bronze medal – third place	1996 Atlanta
Bronze medal – third place	2000 Sydney
FIBA EuroBasket
Silver medal – second place	1995 Greece
Gold medal – first place	2003 Sweden

Donn Charles Nelson (born September 10, 1962) is an American basketball executive who previously held general manager and president of basketball operations roles for the Dallas Mavericks of the National Basketball Association (NBA). He is the son of Hall of Fame basketball coach Don Nelson. In a 2007 Sports Illustrated article ranking the NBA's personnel bosses from 1 to 30, Nelson was ranked 2nd. In a 2009 Yahoo Sports article, Nelson was ranked the third-best general manager of the decade after producing nine 50-plus-win seasons in a row and the first finals appearance in franchise history in 2006. Nelson assembled the Mavericks team that would later win the 2011 NBA championship. Having served since 2005, Nelson was the longest-tenured general manager in the NBA at the time of his parting with the Mavericks in 2021.

Nelson is one of the co-owners of the Texas Legends, the NBA G League affiliate of the Mavericks, located in the Dallas–Fort Worth suburb of Frisco.

== Early life ==
Donnie Nelson is the second of four children, and the only son, of basketball coach Don and Sharon Nelson. He was born in Iowa City during his father's final year at the University of Iowa, and was raised in Natick, Massachusetts when his father played for the Boston Celtics. As a teenager, Nelson also took up basketball, playing in high school for Worcester Academy. However, a broken ankle reduced his playing efficiency. Don's job coaching the Milwaukee Bucks had made the family move to Brookfield, Wisconsin, and the same day Donnie graduated and was driven back home by Sharon in 1982, Don decided to leave his wife. Wishing to remain closer to his mother, Donnie gave up on playing in Iowa or Indiana, and instead went to the Division III Wheaton College in Illinois, where his older sister Julie studied. Despite being an All-America player with Wheaton, he asked his father not to make any calls for a professional tryout. The summer after his freshman year, he joined the Athletes in Action team, traveling first to South America and then to Europe. The experience made Nelson interested in bringing international players to the NBA, a trademark of his subsequent career. He graduated in 1986.

== Early NBA career ==
Nelson's first works with the NBA were in his father's teams, first as a regional scout of the Milwaukee Bucks between 1984 and 1986, and then as the top assistant to Don in the Golden State Warriors from 1986 to 1994. During this time, Nelson also worked as a part-time scout starting in 1987. While playing in Lithuania SSR capital Vilnius, Nelson met Šarūnas Marčiulionis, with whom he struck a friendship despite the language barrier. Once Donnie told his father about Marčiulionis and his skills, the Warriors would draft him in the sixth round of the 1987 NBA draft. After the 1988 Summer Olympics, Marciulionis invited Nelson to Lithuania, where for three months he lived in the player's apartment in Vilnius, staging a series of basketball clinics around the increasingly restive republic. Eventually, Nelson would fly to Moscow to sign Marčiulionis in 1989, leading him to become the first Soviet Union-born player in the NBA.

As Don Nelson resigned from Golden State in 1995, Donnie also left the organization. From 1995 to 1998, Nelson was an assistant coach with the Phoenix Suns. He was a major influence in getting the team to pick Steve Nash, whom he met while Nash played in high school, and would later befriend as Nash became the star of Santa Clara University.

== Dallas Mavericks ==
Nelson's tenure with the Dallas Mavericks began on January 2, 1998, when his father hired him as an assistant coach. In the 1998 NBA draft, Nelson arranged for the Mavericks to draft little-known German Dirk Nowitzki and bring in Nash, who saw limited minutes in Phoenix, through a three-team trade. Both players would win the Most Valuable Player Award. The draft-day trades for Nowitzki and Nash is the first time in NBA history two future MVPs were acquired in the same transaction. Like with Marčiulionis and Eastern Europe in the late 1980s, Nelson opened the league to a traditionally closed market when he made the Mavericks draft the first Chinese player to ever play in the NBA, Wang Zhizhi, in the 1999 NBA draft.

During the 2001–02 NBA season, Nelson was interim head coach of the Mavericks while his father recovered from cancer treatment, leading the team to a 15–8 record. He was promoted to president of basketball operations in July 2002, and he took over as general manager on March 19, 2005, when his father stepped down as coach and general manager.

Donnie Nelson's efforts to rebuild the Mavericks occurred following the team's decade-long playoff drought. During his tenure, the Mavericks won 66% of their games, including five 50-win seasons, two 60-win seasons, and a franchise-record 67-win season in 2007. The 2007 season was tied for the sixth-best regular season in NBA history. The Mavericks are also one of just six franchises to win 60 games or more three times in a five-year span. Stemming from efforts made during Nelson's tenure, the Mavericks reached the playoffs for ten consecutive seasons, reached the Western Conference Finals three times, and advanced to the NBA Finals twice, winning their first NBA Championship in 2011.

Nelson acquired the core group of players on the 2011 championship Mavs roster through key trades and success in the NBA draft. All-Star Tyson Chandler, 2008–09 Sixth Man of the Year Jason Terry, Hall of Fame point guard Jason Kidd, four-time All-Star Shawn Marion, two-time All-Star Caron Butler, and Brendan Haywood were acquired through trades. Nelson was also responsible for adding 2007 MVP, 2011 NBA Finals MVP, and 14-time All-Star Dirk Nowitzki via trade on NBA draft night. On previous teams, Nelson played a role in trading for players such as two-time MVP Steve Nash and All-Star/Sixth Man of the Year Antawn Jamison, as well as acquiring future All-Stars Devin Harris and Josh Howard via the draft.

Nelson continued to shape the Mavericks roster through undervalued draft picks and assertive trades. A young core of the team came together after 2018 All-Star Kristaps Porziņģis was acquired in a 2019 trade-deadline deal with the New York Knicks. He was paired with Luka Dončić, the near-unanimous 2019 Rookie of the Year, who was acquired through a draft-night trade with the Atlanta Hawks in 2018. Nelson also selected Jalen Brunson with the 33rd pick of the 2018 Draft. The 2018 Draft selection of Dončić and Brunson has been called one of the greatest draft classes in NBA history. Porziņģis (trade), Brunson (free agency), and Dončić (trade) all departed Dallas after Nelson's tenure with the Mavericks ended. Porziņģis went on to become an NBA Champion as the starting center of the Boston Celtics (defeating Dallas), Brunson is a three-time All-Star and the 2026 NBA Finals MVP with the New York Knicks, and Dončić has become a global superstar after posting 5 All-NBA 1st Team seasons by the age of 25, the second most in NBA history behind LeBron James.

Nelson has earned a reputation in basketball as an accomplished international scout considering his involvement in Eastern Europe (Marčiulionis) and China (Wang) combined with his role in acquiring future MVPs Steve Nash (Canada) and Dirk Nowitzki (Germany), All-Star Kristaps Porziņģis (Latvia), and five-time All-Star Luka Dončić (Slovenia). He also advocated for the Mavericks to draft future MVP Giannis Antetokounmpo (Greece) in 2013, only to be rebuffed by owner Mark Cuban.

As the Mavericks established an NBA G League (D-League) team in Frisco, Texas, a suburb north of Dallas, Nelson was named co-owner. The Texas Legends began to play in the 2010–11 season, and became the first male professional team coached by a woman, Nancy Lieberman.

In 2020, Nelson finished in 8th place for the Executive of the Year Award.

Nelson and the Mavericks "mutually agreed to part ways" on June 16, 2021, ending Nelson's 24-year tenure with the franchise.

== Olympics ==
Since 1990, Nelson has served as an assistant coach for the Lithuania national basketball team. In 1991, as Lithuania had just been re-established as an independent state, the Lithuanian Basketball Federation could not rely on public funding. Knowing of Marčiulionis's struggles, Nelson helped get sponsors for the Lithuanian team's 1992 Summer Olympics campaign, which included rock band Grateful Dead. In that period, the Lithuanians won three bronze medals in four Olympics, a silver medal in EuroBasket 1995 and a gold medal in EuroBasket 2003. In appreciation for his contributions, Nelson was awarded the Medal of the Order of the Lithuanian Grand Duke Gediminas in 1995 and the Commander's Grand Crosses of the Order for Merits to Lithuania by the President of Lithuania in 2004. He also serves as Honorary Ambassador for the League of Industries.

In 1994, Nelson served as a scout for USA Basketball at the World Championships in Toronto. Dream Team II went undefeated on their way to capturing a gold medal that year.

Nelson also serves as the chief advisor for the China national basketball team. During his two years of service, they equaled their all-time-best Olympic finish (8th) in Athens and won the gold medal at the 2005 Asian Championships.

== Personal life ==
Nelson is married to Lotta and has two children.

Nelson has been involved with several charitable efforts. He worked with the NBA's African Top 100 campaign, an outreach program providing educational opportunities to challenged African athletes. He is the founder of the "Global Games" in Dallas, which gives area high school kids a chance to test themselves against the top Junior National teams in the world. He also helped create the Assist Youth Foundation, who offers opportunities for underprivileged kids in the Dallas/Fort Worth Metroplex and across the globe.

== Filmography ==
Year	Title	Role	Notes	Ref
2012	The Other Dream Team	Himself	Documentary about the Lithuania men's national basketball team at the 1992 Summer Olympics.	
