= Christian Koloko =

Cameroonian basketball player (born 2000)

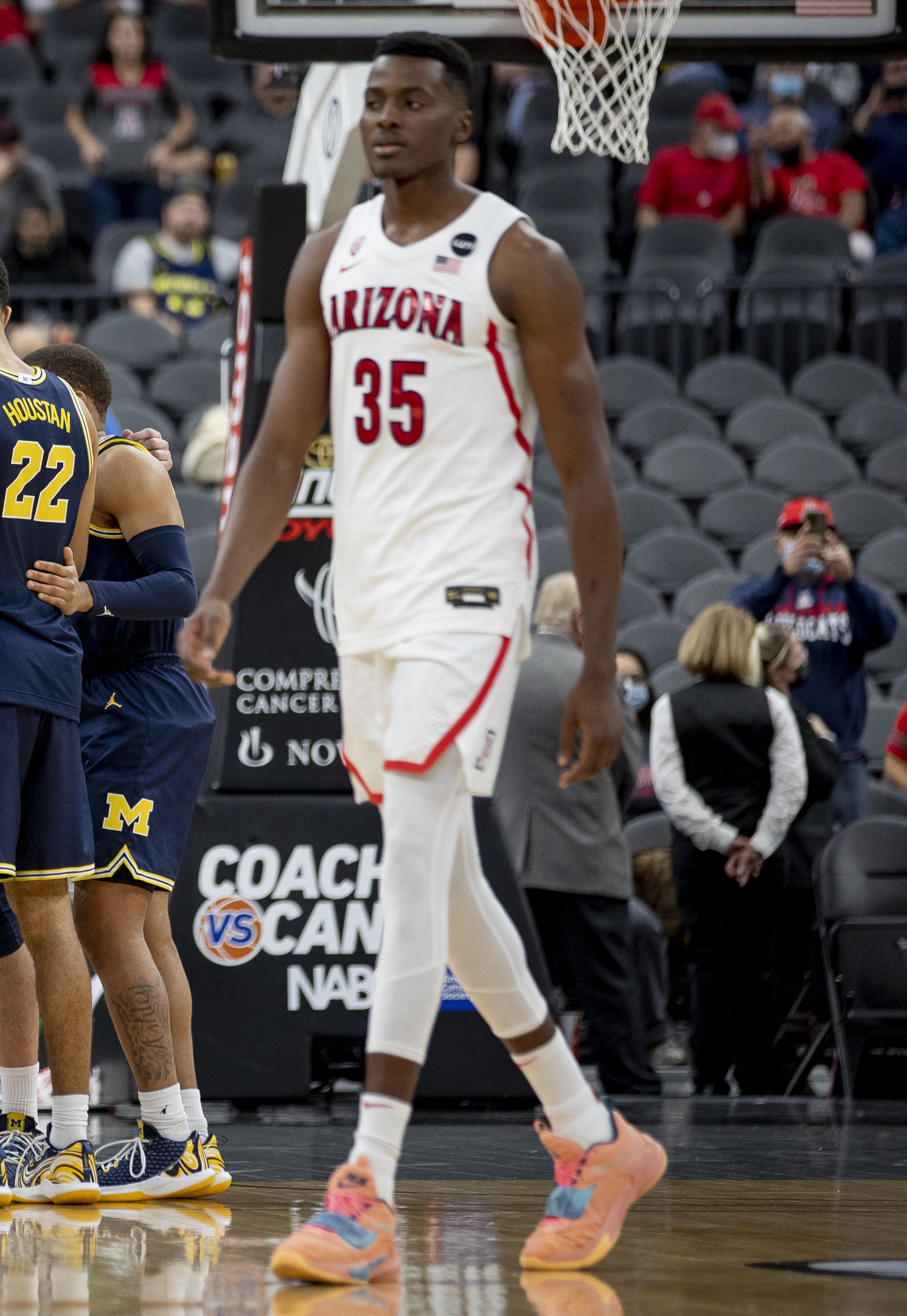
- Koloko with Arizona in 2021

No. 35 – Crvena zvezda Meridianbet
- Position: Center
- League: KLS; ABA League; EuroLeague

Personal information
- Born: 20 June 2000 (age 26) Douala, Cameroon
- Listed height: 2.11 m (6 ft 11 in)
- Listed weight: 102 kg (225 lb)

Career information
- High school: Birmingham (Lake Balboa, California); Sierra Canyon (Chatsworth, California)
- College: Arizona (2019–2022)
- NBA draft: 2022: 2nd round, 33rd overall pick
- Drafted by: Toronto Raptors
- Playing career: 2022–present

Career history
- 2022–2024: Toronto Raptors
- 2023: →Raptors 905
- 2024–2025: Los Angeles Lakers
- 2024–2025: →South Bay Lakers
- 2025: Austin Spurs
- 2025–2026: Memphis Grizzlies
- 2026: Austin Spurs
- 2026: Atlanta Hawks
- 2026: →College Park Skyhawks
- 2026–present: Crvena zvezda

Career highlights
- First-team All-Pac-12 (2022); Pac-12 Defensive Player of the Year (2022); Pac-12 Most Improved Player (2022); Pac-12 All-Defensive Team (2022)
- Stats at NBA.com
- Stats at Basketball Reference

Christian Junior Koloko (born 20 June 2000) is a Cameroonian professional basketball player for Crvena zvezda of the Basketball League of Serbia (KLS), the ABA League, and the EuroLeague. Standing at 2.11 m (6 ft 11 in), he plays the center position. He played college basketball for the Arizona Wildcats, where he was named first-team All-Pac-12 and was voted as the Pac-12 Defensive Player of the Year after his junior season. Koloko was drafted in the second round of the 2022 NBA draft and appeared in 122 total NBA games for the Toronto Raptors, Los Angeles Lakers, Memphis Grizzlies, and Atlanta Hawks.

== Early life ==
Koloko is a native of Babouantou in the west region of Cameroon who grew up in Douala, Cameroon and attended Collège Libermann in his hometown. He grew up playing football and started playing basketball at age 12. In 2017, Koloko moved to the United States to play basketball for Birmingham High School in Lake Balboa, California, as a junior, despite not speaking English at first. For his senior season, he transferred to Sierra Canyon School in Chatsworth, California, where he was teammates with Cassius Stanley, Kenyon Martin Jr. and Scotty Pippen Jr. Koloko helped his team claim its second straight Open Division state title. A four-star recruit, he committed to playing college basketball for Arizona over offers from California, Northwestern, Vanderbilt, Harvard and Princeton.

== College career ==
As a freshman at Arizona, Koloko averaged 2.3 points and 2.4 rebounds per game. In his sophomore season, he averaged 5.3 points and 4.8 rebounds per game. On 21 November 2021, Koloko posted a career-high 22 points, seven rebounds and four blocks in an 80–62 win over fourth-ranked Michigan at the Roman Main Event title game, earning tournament MVP honors. As a junior, he was named Pac-12 Defensive Player of the Year, Pac-12 Most Improved Player, and first-team All-Pac-12.

On 18 April 2022, Koloko declared for the 2022 NBA draft, forgoing his remaining college eligibility.

== Professional career ==
=== Toronto Raptors (2022–2024) ===
Koloko was selected with the 33rd overall pick in the 2022 NBA draft by the Toronto Raptors. On 26 August 2022, Koloko signed a rookie-scale contract with the Raptors. As a rookie, he appeared in 58 games, averaging 3.1 points, 2.9 rebounds, one block and 13.8 minutes per contest.

In April 2023, he developed a blood clot health issue that kept him on the sideline for half of the season. On 17 January 2024, Koloko was waived by the Raptors, as he was not cleared to play and the team was looking to make space on the roster after the Pascal Siakam trade. A day later, he was put into the NBA's fitness-to-play panel due to the seriousness of the blood clot issue, meaning no teams can claim waiver to sign him until he is medically cleared to play.

=== Los Angeles Lakers (2024–2025) ===
On 16 September 2024, Koloko signed a two-way contract with the Los Angeles Lakers, although he still needed to be medically cleared by the NBA and sign a risk waiver to return to the league. On 29 October 2024, he received clearance from the NBA's fitness-to-play panel to start practicing and return to play. On 6 November 2024, he made his Lakers debut against the Memphis Grizzlies with Anthony Davis unavailable to play and Christian Wood still recovering from arthroscopic surgery on his left knee. On 13 November 2024, Jaxson Hayes was diagnosed with a left ankle sprain, which increased Koloko's playing time.

On 26 November 2025, Koloko was waived by the Lakers, following the signing of Drew Timme.

=== Austin Spurs (2025) ===
On 15 December 2025, Koloko was acquired from the player pool by the Austin Spurs of the NBA G League.

=== Memphis Grizzlies (2025–2026) ===
On 22 December 2025, Koloko signed a 10-day contract (hardship exception) with the Memphis Grizzlies due to injuries on the roster, adding depth at center. On 2 January 2026, Koloko signed a second 10-day contract with the Grizzlies.

=== Return to Austin (2026) ===
On 15 January 2026, Koloko was re-acquired by the Austin Spurs.

=== Atlanta Hawks (2026) ===
On 16 January 2026, Koloko signed a two-way contract with the Atlanta Hawks, splitting time with their NBA G League affiliate, the College Park Skyhawks.

=== Crvena zvezda (2026–present) ===
On 18 October 2026, Koloko officially signed a contract with the Serbian team Crvena zvezda for the remainder of the season, marking his move to European basketball to play in the EuroLeague and ABA League.

== Career statistics ==
Legend
GP	Games played	GS	Games started	MPG	Minutes per game
FG%	Field goal percentage	3P%	3-point field goal percentage	FT%	Free throw percentage
RPG	Rebounds per game	APG	Assists per game	SPG	Steals per game
BPG	Blocks per game	PPG	Points per game	**Bold**	Career high

=== NBA ===
Year	Team	GP	GS	MPG	FG%	3P%	FT%	RPG	APG	SPG	BPG	PPG
2022–23	Toronto	**58**	**19**	13.8	.480	**.083**	.627	2.9	.5	.4	1.0	**3.1**
2024–25	L.A. Lakers	37	0	9.2	**.606**	.000	.714	2.5	.5	.2	.4	2.4
2025–26	L.A. Lakers	2	0	3.0	.000	.000	.000	0.5	.0	.0	.0	.0
2025–26	Memphis	11	2	**17.7**	.400	.000	.250	**4.0**	**.9**	**.9**	**1.2**	2.6
2025–26	Atlanta	14	2	11.1	.436	.125	**.818**	2.6	.6	.3	.7	**3.1**
Career		122	23	12.3	.493	.080	.648	2.8	.5	.4	.8	2.8

=== College ===
Year	Team	GP	GS	MPG	FG%	3P%	FT%	RPG	APG	SPG	BPG	PPG
2019–20	Arizona	28	0	8.3	.483	.000	.350	2.4	.2	.3	.9	2.3
2020–21	Arizona	26	19	17.3	.520	.000	.625	4.8	.3	.5	1.3	5.3
2021–22	Arizona	**37**	**37**	**25.4**	**.635**	.000	**.735**	**7.3**	**1.4**	**.8**	**2.8**	**12.6**
Career		91	56	17.9	.590	.000	.670	5.1	.7	.5	1.8	7.3
