= 2024–25 Los Angeles Lakers season =

78th season in franchise history, final under Buss majority ownership

- Division champions
- Head coach: JJ Redick
- President: Jeanie Buss; Rob Pelinka (vice)
- General manager: Rob Pelinka
- Owners: Jerry Buss family trust (majority); Jeanie Buss (controlling owner); Mark Walter, Todd Boehly, Edward P. Roski, and Patrick Soon-Shiong (minority)
- Arena: Crypto.com Arena

Results
- Record: 50–32 (.610)
- Place: Division: 1st (Pacific); Conference: 3rd (Western)
- Playoff finish: First round (lost to Timberwolves 1–4)
- Stats at Basketball Reference

Local media
- Television: Spectrum SportsNet
- Radio: ESPN LA 710 (English); 1020 Radio AM (Spanish)

The 2024–25 Los Angeles Lakers season was the 78th season of the franchise, its 77th season in the National Basketball Association (NBA), its 65th season in Los Angeles, and its 26th season playing home games at Crypto.com Arena. On May 3, 2024, the Lakers fired head coach Darvin Ham and all of their assistant coaches, including Phil Handy, who had been with the team since their 2020 championship season. On June 24, 2024, the Lakers hired JJ Redick as their new head coach. They entered the season as the defending NBA Cup champions; however, they failed to defend the tournament title or qualify for the 2024 NBA Cup knockout stage. They finished the group stage with a 2–2 record, placing third in West Group B.

Prior to the start of the season, the Lakers announced that jersey No. 21 would be retired in honor of Michael Cooper during their game against the San Antonio Spurs on January 13, 2025, after he was announced as a finalist for the 2024 Naismith Memorial Basketball Hall of Fame. In their season-opener against the Minnesota Timberwolves, LeBron James and his son Bronny made NBA history by becoming the first father-son duo to play together in the league. LeBron James would also become the first player in NBA history to play in the NBA both as a teenager and as a 40 year old on New Year's Eve.

For the first time since 2016–17, the Lakers won on opening night and started 3–0 for the first time since 2010–11. With their victory over the Utah Jazz on November 19, 2024, the Lakers posted their first six game winning streak in five seasons. During this season, the Lakers would see two games of theirs postponed for later into the season due to the January 2025 Southern California wildfires, which also saw the loss of coach JJ Redick's home in the area of the Palisades Fire.

On February 2, 2025, the Lakers were involved in a blockbuster three-team trade with the Dallas Mavericks and Utah Jazz, acquiring superstar Luka Dončić alongside Maxi Kleber and Markieff Morris while trading Anthony Davis, Max Christie, and a 2029 1st round pick to the Mavericks, and Jalen Hood-Schifino and two 2nd round picks to the Jazz. This trade is widely considered to be one of the most shocking in NBA history, with it being the first time ever that two reigning All-NBA players were traded for each other during the season.

Very notable this season, on March 26, 2025, LeBron James scored a game winning, buzzer-beating tip-in to stun the Indiana Pacers on the road in a 120–119 victory. This was his first game-winning buzzer beater as a Laker, and his eighth such shot in his career. Only Michael Jordan has more, with nine. The very next day, the Lakers lost to the Chicago Bulls on Josh Giddey's game-winning, buzzer-beating half-court shot over LeBron James, making them the fifth team in NBA history to win and lose on a buzzer-beater on consecutive days.

On April 9, the Lakers clinched a playoff berth for a third consecutive year and the first berth since 2020 not to involve the play-in tournament following their win against the Dallas Mavericks. On April 11, the Lakers won their first Pacific Division title since 2020 following their victory over the Houston Rockets. Entering the playoffs as favorites, the Lakers were upset in the first round by the sixth-seeded Minnesota Timberwolves in five games. This marks the first time since 2005–06 and 2006–07 the Lakers were eliminated in the first round in back-to-back seasons, and the third time in five seasons that the Lakers were eliminated in the first round. It was also the first time they were eliminated in the first round as the 3rd seed or higher.

The Los Angeles Lakers drew an average home attendance of 18,724, the 12th-highest of all NBA teams.

== Draft ==
Round	Pick	Player	Position	Nationality	College / team
1	17 (Note: New Orleans exercised its right to defer the conveyance of this pick until 2025.)	Dalton Knecht	SF	United States	Tennessee
2	55	Bronny James Jr.	PG	United States	USC

The Lakers entered this draft (which was two days long instead of one day long like it had been since 1989) with a first-round pick and a second-round pick. On the first night of the draft, the Lakers selected small forward Dalton Knecht from the University of Tennessee with the first round pick that was conveyed to the Lakers after the New Orleans Pelicans decided to defer it back to the Lakers in exchange for the Lakers' 2025 first-round pick through a previous trade they made. Then, on the second day of the draft, the Lakers selected University of Southern California guard Bronny James, the son of current Lakers player LeBron James, with the 55th pick of the draft. It would famously become the first time in NBA history that a father-son duo would play together in the NBA.

== Roster ==
2024–25 Los Angeles Lakers roster
Players

Pos.	No.	Player	Height	Weight	DOB	From
G/F	77	Luka Dončić	6 ft 6 in (1.98 m)	230 lb (104 kg)	1999-02-28	Slovenia
F	17	Dorian Finney-Smith	6 ft 7 in (2.01 m)	220 lb (100 kg)	1993-05-04	Florida
G	30	Jordan Goodwin	6 ft 5 in (1.96 m)	220 lb (100 kg)	1998-10-23	Saint Louis
F	28	Rui Hachimura	6 ft 8 in (2.03 m)	230 lb (104 kg)	1998-02-08	Gonzaga
C	11	Jaxson Hayes	7 ft 0 in (2.13 m)	220 lb (100 kg)	2000-05-23	Texas
G	9	Bronny James	6 ft 3 in (1.91 m)	210 lb (95 kg)	2004-10-06	USC
F	23	LeBron James	6 ft 9 in (2.06 m)	250 lb (113 kg)	1984-12-30	St. Vincent-St. Mary HS (OH)
C	55	Trey Jemison (TW)	6 ft 11 in (2.11 m)	260 lb (118 kg)	1999-11-28	UAB
G/F	4	Dalton Knecht	6 ft 6 in (1.98 m)	215 lb (98 kg)	2001-04-19	Tennessee
F	14	Maxi Kleber	6 ft 10 in (2.08 m)	240 lb (109 kg)	1992-01-29	Germany
C	10	Christian Koloko (TW)	7 ft 0 in (2.13 m)	220 lb (100 kg)	2000-06-20	Arizona
C	27	Alex Len	7 ft 0 in (2.13 m)	250 lb (113 kg)	1993-06-16	Maryland
G	20	Shake Milton	6 ft 5 in (1.96 m)	205 lb (93 kg)	1996-09-26	SMU
F	88	Markieff Morris	6 ft 9 in (2.06 m)	245 lb (111 kg)	1989-09-02	Kansas
G	15	Austin Reaves	6 ft 5 in (1.96 m)	197 lb (89 kg)	1998-05-29	Oklahoma
F	2	Jarred Vanderbilt	6 ft 8 in (2.03 m)	214 lb (97 kg)	1999-04-03	Kentucky
G	7	Gabe Vincent	6 ft 2 in (1.88 m)	200 lb (91 kg)	1996-07-14	UC Santa Barbara

Coaches
Head coach
- JJ Redick
Assistant(s)
- Bob Beyer
- Scott Brooks
- Lindsey Harding
- Beau Levesque
- Nate McMillan
- Greg St. Jean

Legend
- (DP) Unsigned draft pick
- (FA) Free agent
- (S) Suspended
- (GL) On assignment to G League affiliate
- (TW) Two-way affiliate player
- (L) On leave from the team
- Injured

Roster
Updated: March 27, 2025

== Standings ==
=== Division ===
Pacific Division	W	L	PCT	GB	Home	Road	Div	GP
y – Los Angeles Lakers	50	32	.610	–	31‍–‍10	19‍–‍22	12‍–‍4	82
x – Los Angeles Clippers	50	32	.610	–	30‍–‍11	20‍–‍21	9‍–‍7	82
x – Golden State Warriors	48	34	.585	2.0	24‍–‍17	24‍–‍17	5‍–‍11	82
pi – Sacramento Kings	40	42	.488	10.0	20‍–‍21	20‍–‍21	5‍–‍11	82
Phoenix Suns	36	46	.439	14.0	24‍–‍17	12‍–‍29	9‍–‍7	82

=== Conference ===
Western Conference
#	Team	W	L	PCT	GB	GP
1	z – Oklahoma City Thunder *	68	14	.829	–	82
2	y – Houston Rockets *	52	30	.634	16.0	82
3	y – Los Angeles Lakers *	50	32	.610	18.0	82
4	x – Denver Nuggets	50	32	.610	18.0	82
5	x – Los Angeles Clippers	50	32	.610	18.0	82
6	x – Minnesota Timberwolves	49	33	.598	19.0	82
7	x – Golden State Warriors	48	34	.585	20.0	82
8	x – Memphis Grizzlies	48	34	.585	20.0	82
9	pi – Sacramento Kings	40	42	.488	28.0	82
10	pi – Dallas Mavericks	39	43	.476	29.0	82
11	Phoenix Suns	36	46	.439	32.0	82
12	Portland Trail Blazers	36	46	.439	32.0	82
13	San Antonio Spurs	34	48	.415	34.0	82
14	New Orleans Pelicans	21	61	.256	47.0	82
15	Utah Jazz	17	65	.207	51.0	82

== Game log ==
=== Preseason ===
Due to renovations at Crypto.com Arena, the Lakers did not play any preseason games at their regular home arena.

2024 preseason game log
Total: 2–4 (Home: 0–3; Road: 2–1)
Preseason: 2–4 (home: 0–3; road: 2–1)

Game	Date	Team	Score	High points	High rebounds	High assists	Location Attendance	Record
1	October 4	Minnesota	L 107–124	Knecht, Reaves (16)	Max Christie (7)	Austin Reaves (7)	Acrisure Arena; 9,235	0–1
2	October 6	Phoenix	L 114–118	LeBron James (19)	Davis, Hachimura, Hayes (8)	Austin Reaves (7)	Acrisure Arena; 9,494	0–2
3	October 10	@ Milwaukee	W 107–102	Rui Hachimura (14)	Davis, Knecht (8)	D'Angelo Russell (6)	Fiserv Forum; 15,526	1–2
4	October 15	Golden State	L 97–111	Anthony Davis (24)	Anthony Davis (12)	LeBron James (4)	T-Mobile Arena; 16,907	1–3
5	October 17	@ Phoenix	W 128–122 (OT)	Davis, Knecht (35)	Anthony Davis (10)	D'Angelo Russell (10)	Footprint Center; 17,071	2–3
6	October 18	@ Golden State	L 74–132	Quincy Olivari (22)	Hayes, Olivari, Traoré (7)	Jalen Hood-Schifino (7)	Chase Center; 18,064	2–4

2024–25 season schedule

=== Regular season ===
2024–25 game log
Total: 50–32 (Home: 31–10; Road: 19–22)
October: 3–2 (home: 3–0; road: 0–2)

Game	Date	Team	Score	High points	High rebounds	High assists	Location Attendance	Record
1	October 22	Minnesota	W 110–103	Anthony Davis (36)	Anthony Davis (16)	D'Angelo Russell (5)	Crypto.com Arena; 18,997	1–0
2	October 25	Phoenix	W 123–116	Anthony Davis (35)	Anthony Davis (8)	L. James, Reaves (8)	Crypto.com Arena; 18,997	2–0
3	October 26	Sacramento	W 131–127	LeBron James (32)	LeBron James (14)	LeBron James (10)	Crypto.com Arena; 18,997	3–0
4	October 28	@ Phoenix	L 105–109	Anthony Davis (29)	Anthony Davis (15)	L. James, Russell (8)	Footprint Center; 17,071	3–1
5	October 30	@ Cleveland	L 110–134	LeBron James (26)	Anthony Davis (13)	D'Angelo Russell (5)	Rocket Mortgage FieldHouse; 19,432	3–2

November: 8–6 (home: 4–3; road: 4–3)

Game	Date	Team	Score	High points	High rebounds	High assists	Location Attendance	Record
6	November 1	@ Toronto	W 131–125	Anthony Davis (38)	Anthony Davis (11)	LeBron James (10)	Scotiabank Arena; 19,800	4–2
7	November 4	@ Detroit	L 103–115	Anthony Davis (37)	Anthony Davis (9)	LeBron James (11)	Little Caesars Arena; 20,062	4–3
8	November 6	@ Memphis	L 114–131	LeBron James (39)	Jaxson Hayes (10)	LeBron James (6)	FedExForum; 17,794	4–4
9	November 8	Philadelphia	W 116–106	Anthony Davis (31)	LeBron James (12)	LeBron James (13)	Crypto.com Arena; 18,485	5–4
10	November 10	Toronto	W 123–103	Austin Reaves (27)	LeBron James (10)	LeBron James (16)	Crypto.com Arena; 18,997	6–4
11	November 13	Memphis	W 128–123	LeBron James (35)	Anthony Davis (14)	LeBron James (14)	Crypto.com Arena; 18,997	7–4
12	November 15	@ San Antonio	W 120–115	Anthony Davis (40)	LeBron James (16)	LeBron James (12)	Frost Bank Center; 18,916	8–4
13	November 16	@ New Orleans	W 104–99	Anthony Davis (31)	Anthony Davis (14)	Austin Reaves (7)	Smoothie King Center; 18,761	9–4
14	November 19	Utah	W 124–118	Dalton Knecht (37)	Anthony Davis (14)	LeBron James (12)	Crypto.com Arena; 18,997	10–4
15	November 21	Orlando	L 118–119	Anthony Davis (39)	LeBron James (10)	LeBron James (7)	Crypto.com Arena; 18,997	10–5
16	November 23	Denver	L 102–127	Austin Reaves (19)	Anthony Davis (10)	LeBron James (7)	Crypto.com Arena; 18,997	10–6
17	November 26	@ Phoenix	L 100–127	Anthony Davis (25)	Anthony Davis (15)	LeBron James (10)	Footprint Center; 17,071	10–7
18	November 27	@ San Antonio	W 119–101	Dalton Knecht (20)	Anthony Davis (14)	LeBron James (11)	Frost Bank Center; 19,120	11–7
19	November 29	Oklahoma City	L 93–101	Dalton Knecht (20)	Anthony Davis (12)	Anthony Davis (7)	Crypto.com Arena; 18,997	11–8

December: 7–6 (home: 3–2; road: 4–4)

Game	Date	Team	Score	High points	High rebounds	High assists	Location Attendance	Record
20	December 1	@ Utah	W 105–104	Anthony Davis (33)	Anthony Davis (11)	LeBron James (14)	Delta Center; 18,175	12–8
21	December 2	@ Minnesota	L 80–109	D'Angelo Russell (20)	Anthony Davis (11)	Davis, Russell (5)	Target Center; 18,978	12–9
22	December 4	@ Miami	L 93–134	LeBron James (29)	Christie, Davis (7)	LeBron James (8)	Kaseya Center; 19,657	12–10
23	December 6	@ Atlanta	L 132–134 (OT)	LeBron James (39)	Davis, L. James (10)	LeBron James (11)	State Farm Arena; 18,040	12–11
24	December 8	Portland	W 107–98	Anthony Davis (30)	Anthony Davis (11)	D'Angelo Russell (14)	Crypto.com Arena; 18,997	13–11
25	December 13	@ Minnesota	L 87–97	Anthony Davis (23)	Anthony Davis (11)	Austin Reaves (5)	Target Center; 18,978	13–12
26	December 15	Memphis	W 116–110	Anthony Davis (40)	Anthony Davis (16)	L. James, Reaves (8)	Crypto.com Arena; 15,106	14–12
27	December 19	@ Sacramento	W 113–100	Austin Reaves (25)	Anthony Davis (19)	LeBron James (7)	Golden 1 Center; 17,832	15–12
28	December 21	@ Sacramento	W 103–99	LeBron James (32)	Anthony Davis (15)	LeBron James (6)	Golden 1 Center; 17,832	16–12
29	December 23	Detroit	L 114–117	LeBron James (28)	LeBron James (11)	LeBron James (11)	Crypto.com Arena; 18,997	16–13
30	December 25	@ Golden State	W 115–113	LeBron James (31)	Austin Reaves (10)	L. James, Reaves (10)	Chase Center; 18,064	17–13
31	December 28	Sacramento	W 132–122	Anthony Davis (36)	Anthony Davis (15)	Austin Reaves (16)	Crypto.com Arena; 18,997	18–13
32	December 31	Cleveland	L 110–122	Austin Reaves (35)	Anthony Davis (13)	Austin Reaves (10)	Crypto.com Arena; 18,997	18–14

January: 9–5 (home: 6–1; road: 3–4)

Game	Date	Team	Score	High points	High rebounds	High assists	Location Attendance	Record
33	January 2	Portland	W 114–106	LeBron James (38)	Koloko, Reaves (8)	Austin Reaves (11)	Crypto.com Arena; 17,812	19–14
34	January 3	Atlanta	W 119–102	LeBron James (30)	Anthony Davis (19)	LeBron James (8)	Crypto.com Arena; 18,997	20–14
35	January 5	@ Houston	L 115–119	Anthony Davis (30)	Davis, L. James (13)	Austin Reaves (10)	Toyota Center; 18,055	20–15
36	January 7	@ Dallas	L 97–118	Anthony Davis (21)	Anthony Davis (12)	LeBron James (8)	American Airlines Center; 20,126	20–16
—	January 9	Charlotte	Postponed due to the January 2025 Southern California wildfires. Makeup date February 19.					
—	January 11	San Antonio	Postponed due to the January 2025 Southern California wildfires. Makeup date March 17.					
37	January 13	San Antonio	L 102–126	Anthony Davis (30)	Anthony Davis (13)	James, Reaves (8)	Crypto.com Arena; 18,737	20–17
38	January 15	Miami	W 117–108	Rui Hachimura (23)	Anthony Davis (11)	Austin Reaves (15)	Crypto.com Arena; 17,005	21–17
39	January 17	Brooklyn	W 102–101	Austin Reaves (38)	Jaxson Hayes (9)	LeBron James (8)	Crypto.com Arena; 18,473	22–17
40	January 19	@ L.A. Clippers	L 102–116	LeBron James (25)	Anthony Davis (10)	LeBron James (11)	Intuit Dome; 17,927	22–18
41	January 21	Washington	W 111–88	Anthony Davis (29)	Anthony Davis (16)	LeBron James (13)	Crypto.com Arena; 18,672	23–18
42	January 23	Boston	W 117–96	Anthony Davis (24)	LeBron James (14)	James, Reaves (6)	Crypto.com Arena; 18,997	24–18
43	January 25	@ Golden State	W 118–108	Anthony Davis (36)	Anthony Davis (13)	LeBron James (12)	Chase Center; 18,064	25–18
44	January 27	@ Charlotte	W 112–107	Anthony Davis (42)	Anthony Davis (23)	LeBron James (8)	Spectrum Center; 19,483	26–18
45	January 28	@ Philadelphia	L 104–118	LeBron James (31)	LeBron James (8)	LeBron James (9)	Wells Fargo Center; 19,775	26–19
46	January 30	@ Washington	W 134–96	LeBron James (24)	Jaxson Hayes (10)	LeBron James (11)	Capital One Arena; 17,491	27–19

February: 10–2 (home: 6–1; road: 4–1)

Game	Date	Team	Score	High points	High rebounds	High assists	Location Attendance	Record
47	February 1	@ New York	W 128–112	LeBron James (33)	LeBron James (11)	LeBron James (12)	Madison Square Garden; 19,812	28–19
48	February 4	@ L.A. Clippers	W 122–97	LeBron James (26)	LeBron James (8)	James, Reaves (9)	Intuit Dome; 17,927	29–19
49	February 6	Golden State	W 120–112	LeBron James (42)	LeBron James (17)	LeBron James (8)	Crypto.com Arena; 18,997	30–19
50	February 8	Indiana	W 124–117	Austin Reaves (45)	Jaxson Hayes (12)	Reaves, Vincent (7)	Crypto.com Arena; 18,997	31–19
51	February 10	Utah	W 132–113	LeBron James (24)	Austin Reaves (9)	LeBron James (8)	Crypto.com Arena; 18,997	32–19
52	February 12	@ Utah	L 119–131	Rui Hachimura (19)	Alex Len (7)	Austin Reaves (11)	Delta Center; 18,175	32–20
All-Star Game
53	February 19	Charlotte	L 97–100	LeBron James (26)	Luka Dončić (11)	LeBron James (11)	Crypto.com Arena; 18,997	32–21
54	February 20	@ Portland	W 110–102	LeBron James (40)	Rui Hachimura (12)	Austin Reaves (7)	Moda Center; 19,399	33–21
55	February 22	@ Denver	W 123–100	Luka Dončić (32)	Luka Dončić (10)	Dončić, Reaves (7)	Ball Arena; 19,998	34–21
56	February 25	Dallas	W 107–99	LeBron James (27)	Luka Dončić (15)	Luka Dončić (12)	Crypto.com Arena; 18,997	35–21
57	February 27	Minnesota	W 111–102	LeBron James (33)	LeBron James (17)	LeBron James (6)	Crypto.com Arena; 18,997	36–21
58	February 28	L.A. Clippers	W 106–102	Luka Dončić (31)	LeBron James (13)	Luka Dončić (5)	Crypto.com Arena; 18,997	37–21

March : 9–8 (home: 7–2; road: 2–6)

Game	Date	Team	Score	High points	High rebounds	High assists	Location Attendance	Record
59	March 2	L.A. Clippers	W 108–102	Luka Dončić (29)	Jarred Vanderbilt (9)	Dončić, L. James (9)	Crypto.com Arena; 18,997	38–21
60	March 4	New Orleans	W 136–115	LeBron James (34)	Jaxson Hayes (10)	Luka Dončić (15)	Crypto.com Arena; 18,997	39–21
61	March 6	New York	W 113–109 (OT)	Luka Dončić (32)	LeBron James (12)	Luka Dončić (12)	Crypto.com Arena; 18,997	40–21
62	March 8	@ Boston	L 101–111	Luka Dončić (34)	LeBron James (14)	LeBron James (9)	TD Garden; 19,156	40–22
63	March 10	@ Brooklyn	L 108–111	Gabe Vincent (24)	Luka Dončić (12)	Luka Dončić (12)	Barclays Center; 18,215	40–23
64	March 13	@ Milwaukee	L 106–126	Luka Dončić (45)	Luka Dončić (11)	Dončić, Goodwin, Knecht, Reaves (3)	Fiserv Forum; 18,017	40–24
65	March 14	@ Denver	L 126–131	Austin Reaves (37)	Austin Reaves (8)	Austin Reaves (13)	Ball Arena; 19,946	40–25
66	March 16	Phoenix	W 107–96	Luka Dončić (33)	Luka Dončić (11)	Luka Dončić (8)	Crypto.com Arena; 18,997	41–25
67	March 17	San Antonio	W 125–109	Austin Reaves (30)	Jaxson Hayes (11)	Luka Dončić (14)	Crypto.com Arena; 17,723	42–25
68	March 19	Denver	W 120–108	Luka Dončić (31)	Luka Dončić (8)	Austin Reaves (8)	Crypto.com Arena; 18,997	43–25
69	March 20	Milwaukee	L 89–118	B. James, Knecht (17)	Alex Len (9)	Goodwin, B. James (5)	Crypto.com Arena; 17,709	43–26
70	March 22	Chicago	L 115–146	Luka Dončić (34)	Luka Dončić (8)	Luka Dončić (6)	Crypto.com Arena; 18,997	43–27
71	March 24	@ Orlando	L 106–118	Luka Dončić (32)	Dončić, Finney-Smith (7)	Dončić, L. James (7)	Kia Center; 19,598	43–28
72	March 26	@ Indiana	W 120–119	Luka Dončić (34)	LeBron James (13)	Dončić, L. James (7)	Gainbridge Fieldhouse; 17,274	44–28
73	March 27	@ Chicago	L 117–119	Austin Reaves (30)	Luka Dončić (10)	LeBron James (12)	United Center; 21,957	44–29
74	March 29	@ Memphis	W 134–127	Austin Reaves (31)	Luka Dončić (8)	Luka Dončić (9)	FedExForum; 18,087	45–29
75	March 31	Houston	W 104–98	Dončić, Finney-Smith, Vincent (20)	L. James, Reaves (8)	Luka Dončić (9)	Crypto.com Arena; 18,997	46–29

April: 4–3 (home: 2–1; road: 2–2)

Game	Date	Team	Score	High points	High rebounds	High assists	Location Attendance	Record
76	April 3	Golden State	L 116–123	LeBron James (33)	Luka Dončić (8)	LeBron James (9)	Crypto.com Arena; 18,997	46–30
77	April 4	New Orleans	W 124–108	Luka Dončić (35)	Jaxson Hayes (12)	LeBron James (8)	Crypto.com Arena; 18,997	47–30
78	April 6	@ Oklahoma City	W 126–99	Luka Dončić (30)	Dončić, Finney-Smith, Hachimura (7)	LeBron James (7)	Paycom Center; 18,203	48–30
79	April 8	@ Oklahoma City	L 120–136	LeBron James (28)	Jarred Vanderbilt (12)	Dončić, Reaves (5)	Paycom Center; 18,203	48–31
80	April 9	@ Dallas	W 112–97	Luka Dončić (45)	Luka Dončić (8)	Luka Dončić (6)	American Airlines Center; 20,841	49–31
81	April 11	Houston	W 140–109	Luka Dončić (39)	Luka Dončić (8)	LeBron James (8)	Crypto.com Arena; 18,997	50–31
82	April 13	@ Portland	L 81–109	Dalton Knecht (27)	Jemison III, Koloko, Knecht (8)	B. James, Morris (6)	Moda Center; 19,335	50–32

2024–25 season schedule

=== Playoffs ===
2025 playoff game log
Total: 1–4 (home: 1–2; road: 0–2)
First round: 1–4 (home: 1–2; road: 0–2)

Game	Date	Team	Score	High points	High rebounds	High assists	Location Attendance	Series
1	April 19	Minnesota	L 95–117	Luka Dončić (37)	Luka Dončić (8)	James, Reaves (3)	Crypto.com Arena; 18,997	0–1
2	April 22	Minnesota	W 94–85	Luka Dončić (31)	Luka Dončić (12)	Luka Dončić (9)	Crypto.com Arena; 18,997	1–1
3	April 25	@ Minnesota	L 104–116	LeBron James (38)	LeBron James (10)	Luka Dončić (8)	Target Center; 19,312	1–2
4	April 27	@ Minnesota	L 113–116	Luka Dončić (38)	LeBron James (12)	LeBron James (8)	Target Center; 19,289	1–3
5	April 30	Minnesota	L 96–103	Luka Dončić (28)	Dončić, James, Vanderbilt (7)	Luka Dončić (9)	Crypto.com Arena; 18,997	1–4

2025 playoff schedule

=== NBA Cup ===
The groups were revealed during the tournament announcement on July 12, 2024. The Lakers initially won their first two games of the NBA Cup and looked to continue their win streak in the mid-season tournament play that started last season back in the 2023 NBA In-Season Tournament, but losses to the Phoenix Suns and Oklahoma City Thunder near the end of Group B play would eliminate the Lakers' run at repeating as champions of the renamed NBA Cup.

==== West Group B ====
Pos	Team	Pld	W	L	PF	PA	PD	Qualification
1	Oklahoma City Thunder	4	3	1	437	392	+45	Advance to knockout stage
2	Phoenix Suns	4	3	1	434	404	+30	
3	Los Angeles Lakers	4	2	2	437	461	−24	
4	San Antonio Spurs	4	2	2	446	443	+3	
5	Utah Jazz	4	0	4	451	505	−54	

Source: NBA
Rules for classification: Tiebreakers

==== Game log ====
2024–25 game log
Total: 2–2 (Home: 1–1; Road: 1–1)
NBA Cup: 2–2 (home: 1–1; road: 1–1)

Game	Date	Team	Score	High points	High rebounds	High assists	Location Attendance	Record
1	November 15	@ San Antonio	W 120–115	Anthony Davis (40)	Anthony Davis (16)	LeBron James (12)	Frost Bank Center; 18,916	1–0
2	November 19	Utah	W 124–118	Dalton Knecht (37)	Anthony Davis (14)	LeBron James (12)	Crypto.com Arena; 18,997	2–0
3	November 26	@ Phoenix	L 100–127	Anthony Davis (25)	Anthony Davis (15)	LeBron James (10)	Footprint Center; 17,071	2–1
4	November 29	Oklahoma City	L 93–101	Dalton Knecht (20)	Anthony Davis (11)	Anthony Davis (8)	Crypto.com Arena; 18,997	2–2

2024–25 season schedule

== Player statistics ==
Legend
GP	Games played	GS	Games started	MPG	Minutes per game
FG%	Field-goal percentage	3P%	3-point field-goal percentage	FT%	Free-throw percentage
RPG	Rebounds per game	APG	Assists per game	SPG	Steals per game
BPG	Blocks per game	PPG	Points per game

=== Regular season ===
Los Angeles Lakers statistics
Player	GP	GS	MPG	FG%	3P%	FT%	RPG	APG	SPG	BPG	PPG
Max Christie^{†}	46	25	25.1	.444	.368	.851	2.7	1.4	.8	.5	8.5
Anthony Davis^{†}	42	42	34.3	.528	.298	.788	11.9	3.4	1.3	2.1	25.7
Luka Dončić^{†}	28	28	35.1	.438	.379	.791	8.1	7.5	1.6	.4	28.2
Dorian Finney-Smith^{†}	43	20	28.8	.442	.398	.714	3.6	1.4	.9	.3	7.9
Jordan Goodwin	29	5	18.7	.438	.382	.818	3.9	1.4	1.0	.4	5.6
Rui Hachimura	59	57	31.7	.509	.413	.770	5.0	1.4	.8	.4	13.1
Jaxson Hayes	56	35	19.5	.722	.000	.622	4.8	1.0	.6	.9	6.8
Jalen Hood-Schifino^{†}	2	0	7.0	1.000	–	1.000	.5	.5	.0	.5	2.0
Bronny James	27	1	6.7	.313	.281	.786	.7	.8	.3	.1	2.3
LeBron James	70	70	34.9	.513	.376	.782	7.8	8.2	1.0	.6	24.4
Trey Jemison III^{†}	22	0	10.3	.619	–	.417	2.8	.3	.1	.4	2.6
Dalton Knecht	78	6	19.2	.461	.376	.762	2.8	.8	.3	.1	9.1
Christian Koloko	37	0	9.2	.606	.000	.714	2.5	.4	.2	.4	2.4
Alex Len^{†}	10	4	12.2	.455	.333	.250	3.1	.8	.1	.3	2.2
Maxwell Lewis^{†}	7	0	4.1	.333	–	–	.3	.3	.1	.0	.6
Shake Milton^{†}	30	1	11.5	.433	.294	.846	1.8	1.3	.3	.1	3.9
Markieff Morris^{†}	8	2	15.5	.333	.304	.833	1.9	2.1	.1	.3	5.5
Quincy Olivari	2	0	5.0	.200	.200	–	.0	.5	.0	.0	1.5
Austin Reaves	73	73	34.9	.460	.377	.877	4.5	5.8	1.1	.3	20.2
Cam Reddish	33	8	17.8	.404	.277	.615	2.0	.7	1.0	.3	3.2
D'Angelo Russell^{†}	29	10	26.3	.415	.333	.849	2.8	4.7	.8	.1	12.4
Armel Traoré	9	0	7.4	.316	.000	.286	1.7	.1	.4	.2	1.6
Jarred Vanderbilt	36	2	16.1	.488	.281	.556	5.1	1.1	1.0	.3	4.1
Gabe Vincent	72	11	21.2	.400	.353	.714	1.3	1.4	.7	.2	6.4

=== Playoffs ===
Los Angeles Lakers statistics
Player	GP	GS	MPG	FG%	3P%	FT%	RPG	APG	SPG	BPG	PPG
Luka Dončić	5	5	41.6	.452	.348	.891	7.0	5.8	1.0	.6	30.2
Dorian Finney-Smith	5	1	34.0	.414	.368	–	4.2	2.6	.2	.4	6.2
Jordan Goodwin	4	0	7.8	.200	.000	.500	1.3	.5	.3	.3	.8
Rui Hachimura	5	5	36.4	.491	.484	1.000	4.6	1.0	.6	.6	14.8
Jaxson Hayes	4	4	7.8	.375	–	.500	2.0	.3	.0	.3	1.8
Bronny James	2	0	2.0	.000	.000	–	.0	.0	.0	.0	.0
LeBron James	5	5	40.8	.489	.357	.775	9.0	5.6	2.0	1.8	25.4
Maxi Kleber	1	0	5.0	.000	.000	1.000	.0	.0	.0	.0	2.0
Dalton Knecht	2	0	2.0	.400	.250	–	1.5	.0	.0	.0	2.5
Alex Len	2	0	2.0	.000	–	–	2.0	.0	.0	.0	.0
Shake Milton	2	0	2.0	.000	–	–	.0	.0	.0	.0	.0
Austin Reaves	5	5	39.2	.411	.319	.857	5.4	3.6	.2	.6	16.2
Jarred Vanderbilt	5	0	12.0	.333	.000	.750	3.8	1.0	.6	.2	1.4
Gabe Vincent	5	0	19.8	.357	.308	–	1.0	1.0	.2	.4	2.8

- ^{†} Denotes player spent time with another team in the season. Stats reflect time with the Lakers only.

== Transactions ==
=== Trades ===
December 29, 2024
To Brooklyn Nets

- Maxwell Lewis
- D'Angelo Russell
- 2027 conditional Lakers second-round pick (Note: If the Lakers' pick is at No. 1–4 during that year, their second-round pick will go to Utah instead.)
- 2030 Lakers second-round pick
- 2031 Lakers second-round pick
To Los Angeles Lakers

- Dorian Finney-Smith
- Shake Milton

February 2, 2025
Three-team trade

To Dallas Mavericks

- Max Christie (from Los Angeles)
- Anthony Davis (from Los Angeles)
- 2029 LAL first-round pick
To Los Angeles Lakers

- Luka Dončić (from Dallas)
- Maxi Kleber (from Dallas)
- Markieff Morris (from Dallas)
To Utah Jazz

- Jalen Hood-Schifino (from Los Angeles)
- 2025 DAL second-round pick (from Dallas)
- 2025 LAC second-round pick (from Los Angeles)

=== Free agency ===
==== Re-signed ====
Date	Player	Contract terms	Ref.
July 6, 2024	Max Christie	4-year $32M contract	
July 6, 2024	LeBron James	2-year $101M contract	

==== Additions ====
Date	Player	Contract terms	Former team	Ref.
July 5, 2024	Armel Traoré	Two-way contract	(France) ADA Blois	
August 14, 2024	Quincy Olivari	Two-way contract	Xavier Musketeers	
September 16, 2024	Christian Koloko	Two-way contract	Toronto Raptors	
December 29, 2024	Dorian Finney-Smith	Traded	Brooklyn Nets	
December 29, 2024	Shake Milton	Traded	Brooklyn Nets	
February 1, 2025	Luka Dončić	Trade	Dallas Mavericks	
February 1, 2025	Maxi Kleber	Trade	Dallas Mavericks	
February 1, 2025	Markieff Morris	Trade	Dallas Mavericks	
February 11, 2025	Alex Len	Free Agent	Sacramento Kings	

==== Subtractions ====
Date	Player	Reason	New team	Ref.
July 9, 2024	Taurean Prince	Free Agent	Milwaukee Bucks	
August 3, 2024	Spencer Dinwiddie	Free Agent	Dallas Mavericks	
September 25, 2024	Skylar Mays	Two-way contract	Minnesota Timberwolves	
September 28, 2024	Harry Giles III	Two-way contract	Charlotte Hornets	
December 29, 2024	D'Angelo Russell	Trade	Brooklyn Nets	
December 29, 2024	Maxwell Lewis	Trade	Brooklyn Nets	
February 1, 2025	Max Christie	Trade	Dallas Mavericks	
February 1, 2025	Anthony Davis	Trade	Dallas Mavericks	
February 1, 2025	Jalen Hood-Schifino	Trade	Utah Jazz	
