= Quincy Olivari =

American basketball player (born 2001)

No. 8 – Dolomiti Energia Trento
- Position: Point guard
- League: LBA; EuroCup

Personal information
- Born: May 27, 2001 (age 25) Atlanta, Georgia, U.S.
- Listed height: 6 ft 3 in (1.91 m)
- Listed weight: 200 lb (91 kg)

Career information
- High school: Westlake (Atlanta, Georgia)
- College: Rice (2019–2023); Xavier (2023–2024)
- NBA draft: 2024: undrafted
- Playing career: 2024–present

Career history
- 2024–2025: Los Angeles Lakers
- 2024–2025: →South Bay Lakers
- 2025: South Bay Lakers
- 2025–2026: Motor City Cruise
- 2026–present: Aquila Basket Trento

Career highlights
- Second-team All-C-USA (2023); Third-team All-C-USA (2021)
- Stats at NBA.com
- Stats at Basketball Reference

Quincy Andrew Olivari (born May 27, 2001) is an American professional basketball player for Aquila Basket Trento of the Italian Lega Basket Serie A (LBA) and the EuroCup. He played college basketball for the Rice Owls and the Xavier Musketeers.

== High school career ==
Olivari attended Westlake at Atlanta, Georgia, where he averaged 15 points, six rebounds, four assists and two steals as a senior and led the team to state and region championships in 2016, the regional finals in 2017 and the Sweet 16 in 2018.

== College career ==
Olivari played four collegiate seasons at Rice and one at Xavier. He led the Owls and was third in Conference USA in scoring with 18.7 points per game and was also third in C-USA with 94 three-pointers, in minutes with 33.6, sixth in field goal percentage with .413, ninth in free throw percentage with .793, and 11th in rebounding with 5.9. His 94 three-pointers in a season are the second-most school history and his 654 points are the fifth-most in a season among the Owls.

In his lone season as a Musketeer, Olivari appeared in and started 34 games while averaging 19.1 points, 5.6 rebounds, 2.1 assists and 1.4 steals in 32.2 minutes. He finished the season as the Big East’s leader in 3-point field goal percentage with .409 and was voted Big East Honorable Mention for his play.

== Professional career ==
After going undrafted in the 2024 NBA draft, Olivari joined the Los Angeles Lakers for the 2024 NBA Summer League and on August 14, 2024, he signed with them on an exhibit 10 contract. On October 19, his deal was converted into a two-way contract. On December 12, he signed a multiyear sneaker deal with Under Armour's Curry Brand. On January 15, 2025, Olivari was waived and seven days later, he joined South Bay.

On July 5, Olivari was added to the roster of the Brooklyn Nets for the 2025 NBA 2K26 Summer League, but did not make the final roster.

On September 23, 2025, Olivari signed a two way deal with the Detroit Pistons. Two day later he was waived by the Pistons. After acquiring his returning playing rights from the South Bay Lakers, Olivari was signed by the Motor City Cruise.

On July 18, 2026, he signed with Aquila Basket Trento of the Italian Lega Basket Serie A (LBA).

== Career statistics ==
Legend
GP	Games played	GS	Games started	MPG	Minutes per game
FG%	Field goal percentage	3P%	3-point field goal percentage	FT%	Free throw percentage
RPG	Rebounds per game	APG	Assists per game	SPG	Steals per game
BPG	Blocks per game	PPG	Points per game	**Bold**	Career high

=== NBA ===
Year	Team	GP	GS	MPG	FG%	3P%	FT%	RPG	APG	SPG	BPG	PPG
2024–25	L.A. Lakers	2	0	5.2	.200	.200	—	.0	.5	.0	.0	1.5
Career		2	0	5.2	.200	.200	—	.0	.5	.0	.0	1.5

=== College ===
Year	Team	GP	GS	MPG	FG%	3P%	FT%	RPG	APG	SPG	BPG	PPG
2019–20	Rice	30	0	14.2	.401	.380	.674	1.7	.6	.6	.0	6.0
2020–21	Rice	28	21	28.7	.408	**.409**	**.823**	5.3	1.0	.3	.0	16.3
2021–22	Rice	20	16	27.6	.396	.343	.704	**6.0**	2.1	.8	.0	9.9
2022–23	Rice	**35**	**35**	**33.6**	.413	.364	.793	5.9	**2.2**	1.0	**.1**	18.7
2023–24	Xavier	34	34	32.2	**.425**	**.409**	.814	5.6	2.1	**1.4**	**.1**	**19.1**
Career		147	106	27.6	.412	.387	.790	4.9	1.6	.8	.0	14.5

== Personal life ==
Olivari is the son of Gerald and Courtney Olivari.

Olivari earned his bachelor's degree in sport administration from Rice, and completed his master's degree at Xavier in December 2024 during his rookie season with the Lakers.

On May 17, 2025, Olivari officially graduated from Xavier with a master's degree, notably wearing his Lakers jersey under his graduation gown.
