= Dalton Knecht =

American basketball player (born 2001)

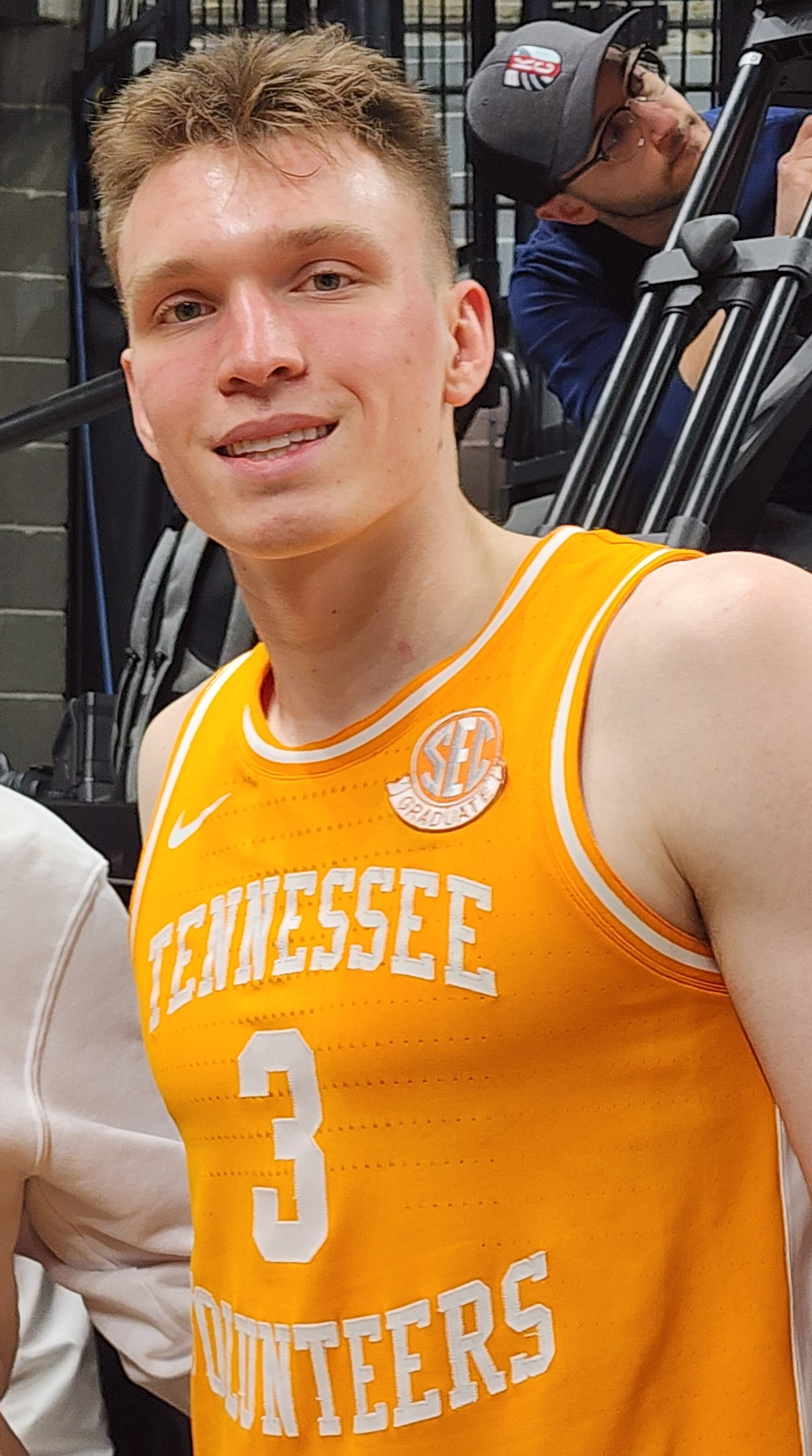
- Knecht with Tennessee in 2024

No. 1 – New York Knicks
- Position: Small forward
- League: NBA

Personal information
- Born: April 19, 2001 (age 25) Fargo, North Dakota, U.S.
- Listed height: 6 ft 5 in (1.96 m)
- Listed weight: 215 lb (98 kg)

Career information
- High school: Prairie View (Henderson, Colorado)
- College: Northeastern JC (2019–2021); Northern Colorado (2021–2023); Tennessee (2023–2024)
- NBA draft: 2024: 1st round, 17th overall pick
- Drafted by: Los Angeles Lakers
- Playing career: 2024–present

Career history
- 2024–2026: Los Angeles Lakers
- 2025: →South Bay Lakers
- 2026–present: New York Knicks
- 2026–present: →Westchester Knicks

Career highlights
- Consensus first-team All-American (2024); Julius Erving Award (2024); SEC Player of the Year (2024); SEC Newcomer of the Year (2024); First-team All-SEC (2024); Second-team All-Big Sky (2023)
- Stats at NBA.com
- Stats at Basketball Reference

Dalton Douglas Knecht (/kəˈnɛkt/; born April 19, 2001) is an American professional basketball player for the New York Knicks of the National Basketball Association (NBA), on a two-way contract with the Westchester Knicks of the NBA G League. He played college basketball for Northeastern Junior College, Northern Colorado, and Tennessee. He was selected 17th overall by the Lakers in the 2024 NBA draft.

== Early life ==
Knecht is the son of Corey and Carrie Knecht. Knecht was born in Fargo, North Dakota, and grew up in Thornton, Colorado, attending Prairie View High School in Henderson. He entered his sophomore year at 5 feet 8 inches (1.73 m) and grew to 6 feet 1 inch (1.85 m) by his junior year. Knecht averaged 21 points and 6.5 rebounds per game as a senior.

== College career ==
=== Northeastern Junior College (2019–2021) ===
Knecht began his college basketball career at Northeastern Junior College in Sterling, Colorado. He grew another two inches between his senior high school season and his first season with the Plainsmen. Knecht averaged 13.3 points, 2.9 rebounds and 1.1 assists per game as a freshman. He averaged 23.9 points, 7.5 rebounds and two assists per game as a sophomore. Knecht grew another three inches during his time playing at Northeastern Junior College to bring his height to 6 feet 6 inches (1.98 m). He committed to transfer to Northern Colorado to continue his college career.

=== Northern Colorado (2021–2023) ===
Knecht averaged 8.9 points and 3.6 rebounds per game in his first season with the Northern Colorado Bears. As a senior, he led the Big Sky Conference with 20.2 points and 7.2 rebounds per game. Knecht’s senior year performance earned him Second-team All-Big Sky honors.

After the season, Knecht decided to utilize the extra year of eligibility granted to college athletes who played in the 2020–21 season due to the COVID-19 pandemic and entered the NCAA transfer portal.

=== Tennessee (2023–2024) ===
Knecht transferred to Tennessee for the 2023–24 season. He was named the Southeastern Conference (SEC) Player of the Week for the first week of the season after scoring 17 points in the Volunteers' season-opening win over Tennessee Tech and 24 points with five rebounds in an 80–70 road victory over Wisconsin on November 10, 2023. Knecht scored a then-career-high 37 points in a 100–92 loss to North Carolina on November 29, 2023. He was named the SEC Player of the Week a second time on January 15, 2024, after scoring 28 points in a 77–72 loss to Mississippi State and 36 points in an 85–79 win over Georgia. Knecht set a then career high with 39 points in an 85–66 win over Florida on January 16, 2024. On February 29, 2024, Knecht tied his then-career high with 39 points against 11th-ranked Auburn in a 92–84 win. On March 9, 2024, Knecht set a new career high on senior night with 40 points in an 85–81 loss to 15th-ranked Kentucky.

Knecht was named SEC Player of the Year by both the league's coaches and the Associated Press (AP). He was also named SEC Newcomer of the Year by the AP. (Note: The Newcomer of the Year award is one of two awards presented to the top player in his first season of SEC play. The league's coaches vote on a Freshman of the Year award, restricted to players in their first season playing college basketball; this award went to Kentucky's Reed Sheppard in 2024.)

== Professional career ==
=== Los Angeles Lakers (2024–2026) ===
Knecht was selected with the 17th overall pick by the Los Angeles Lakers in the 2024 NBA draft and he signed with them on July 3, 2024.

Knecht made his NBA debut on October 22, 2024, in a 110–103 win over the Minnesota Timberwolves, scoring 5 points. On November 13, Knecht scored a then career-high 19 points on 7-of-8 shooting from the field with 5-of-5 shooting from three-point range in a 128–123 win over the Memphis Grizzlies. Three days later, he broke this record, scoring a then career-high 27 points along with seven rebounds, two assists, and two steals in a 104–99 win over the New Orleans Pelicans. On November 19, Knecht scored a career-high 37 points, including nine three-pointers, in a 124–118 victory against the Utah Jazz. He also tied the record for the most three-pointers made in a single game by a rookie in NBA history.

On February 6, 2025, the Lakers agreed to trade Knecht, Cam Reddish, a future first-round pick, and a pick swap to the Charlotte Hornets in exchange for Mark Williams. However, the trade was rescinded two days later after Williams failed his physical with the Lakers. Returning to the Lakers, for the rest of February, he scored 5.1 points per game and shot 32.1% on three-point shots. However, during March and April, he increased his scoring average to 9.7 point per game and 43.3% in three-point shots. During that stretch, he had games of 32 points against Denver and 27 points against Portland. For the season, Knecht shot 37.6% from three-point range and averaged 9.1 points per game.

On December 15, 2025, Knecht was assigned to the South Bay Lakers.

On October 19, 2026, Knecht was waived by the Lakers.

=== New York Knicks / Westchester Knicks (2026–present) ===
On October 23, 2026, Knecht was signed to a two-way contract by the New York Knicks and its G League affiliate, the Westchester Knicks. On November 4, Knecht made his Knicks debut, putting up 10 points and seven rebounds in a 135–105 win over the Chicago Bulls.

== Career statistics ==
Legend
GP	Games played	GS	Games started	MPG	Minutes per game
FG%	Field goal percentage	3P%	3-point field goal percentage	FT%	Free throw percentage
RPG	Rebounds per game	APG	Assists per game	SPG	Steals per game
BPG	Blocks per game	PPG	Points per game	**Bold**	Career high

=== NBA ===
==== Regular season ====
Year	Team	GP	GS	MPG	FG%	3P%	FT%	RPG	APG	SPG	BPG	PPG
2024–25	L.A. Lakers	**78**	**16**	**19.2**	**.461**	**.376**	**.762**	**2.8**	**.8**	**.3**	.1	**9.1**
2025–26	L.A. Lakers	54	1	10.2	.455	.342	.727	1.4	.4	.2	**.2**	4.2
Career		132	17	15.5	.460	.368	.755	2.2	.7	.3	.1	7.1

==== Playoffs ====
Year	Team	GP	GS	MPG	FG%	3P%	FT%	RPG	APG	SPG	BPG	PPG
2025	L.A. Lakers	2	0	1.8	**.400**	.250	—	**1.5**	.0	.0	.0	**2.5**
2026	L.A. Lakers	**5**	0	**3.6**	.375	**.400**	**1.000**	1.2	**.6**	.0	.0	2.0
Career		7	0	3.1	.385	.333	1.000	1.3	.4	.0	.0	2.1

=== College ===
==== NCAA Division I ====
Year	Team	GP	GS	MPG	FG%	3P%	FT%	RPG	APG	SPG	BPG	PPG
2021–22	Northern Colorado	35	11	24.1	.436	.361	.753	3.6	.9	.5	.5	8.9
2022–23	Northern Colorado	32	32	**35.3**	**.479**	.381	.771	**7.2**	**1.8**	**.8**	**.6**	20.2
2023–24	Tennessee	**36**	**36**	30.6	.458	**.397**	**.772**	4.9	**1.8**	.7	**.6**	**21.7**
Career		103	79	29.8	.461	.383	.768	5.2	1.5	.7	.6	16.9

==== NJCAA ====
Year	Team	GP	GS	MPG	FG%	3P%	FT%	RPG	APG	SPG	BPG	PPG
2019–20	Northeastern JC	**31**	14	—	.504	**.451**	.786	2.9	1.1	.5	.3	13.3
2020–21	Northeastern JC	20	**20**	—	**.512**	.395	**.818**	**7.5**	**2.0**	**.7**	**.5**	**23.9**
Career		51	34	—	.508	.432	.807	4.7	1.5	.6	.3	17.5
