= Armel Traoré =

French basketball player (born 2003)

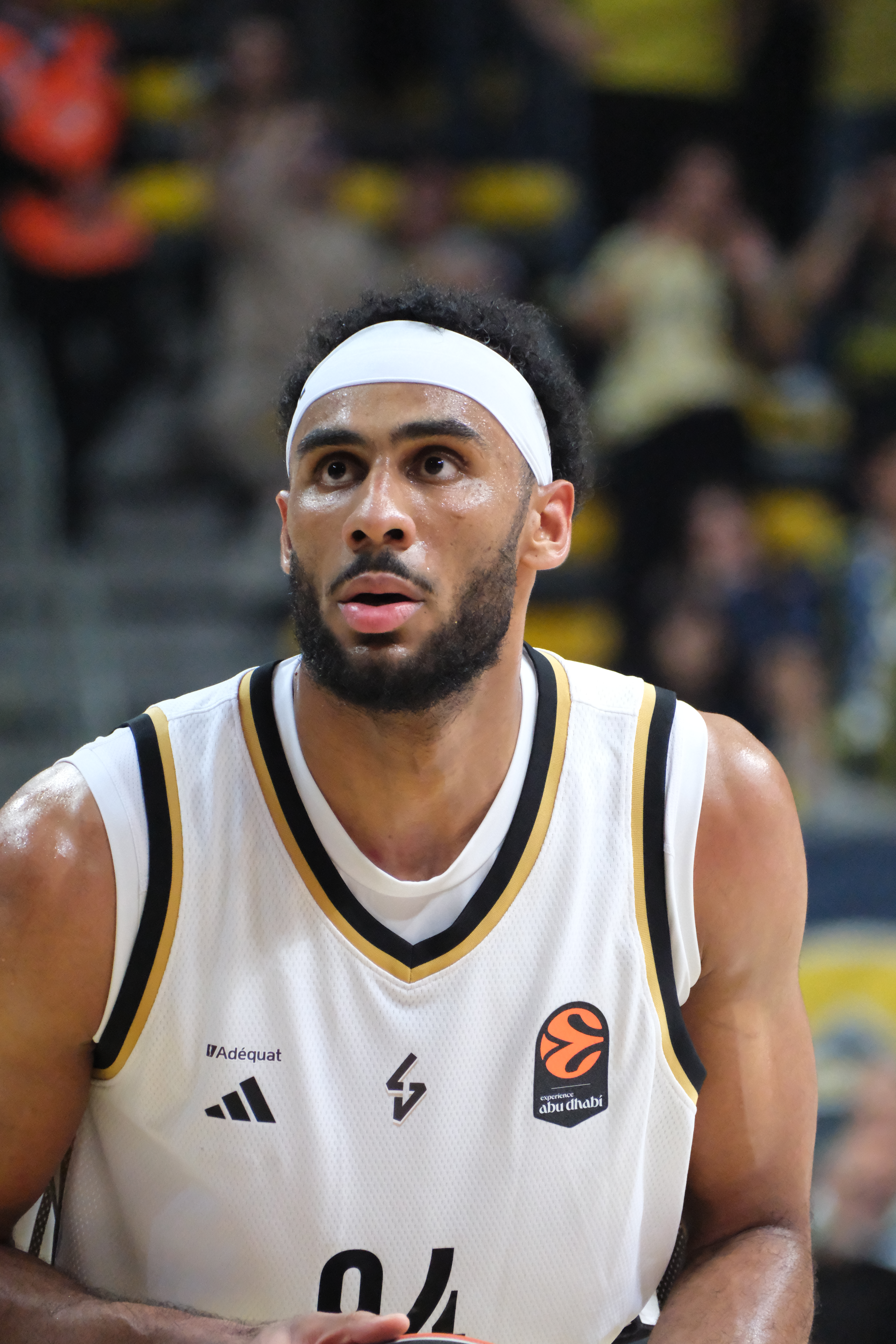
- Traoré with ASVEL Basket in 2025

No. 94 – Ratiopharm Ulm
- Position: Small forward / power forward
- League: Basketball Bundesliga; EuroCup

Personal information
- Born: January 23, 2003 (age 23) Créteil, France
- Listed height: 6 ft 9 in (2.06 m)
- Listed weight: 245 lb (111 kg)

Career information
- NBA draft: 2024: undrafted
- Playing career: 2018–present

Career history
- 2018–2021: CFBB
- 2021–2022: AS Monaco
- 2022: →ALM Évreux
- 2022–2023: Metropolitans 92
- 2023–2024: ADA Blois
- 2024–2025: Los Angeles Lakers
- 2024–2025: →South Bay Lakers
- 2025: Manresa
- 2025–2026: ASVEL Basket
- 2026–present: Ratiopharm Ulm
- Stats at NBA.com
- Stats at Basketball Reference

Armel Traoré (born January 23, 2003) is a French professional basketball player for Ratiopharm Ulm of the Basketball Bundesliga (BBL) and the EuroCup. He has previously played for the Los Angeles Lakers of the NBA and the South Bay Lakers of the NBA G League.

== Professional career ==
=== AS Monaco / ALM Évreux (2021–2022) ===
After beginning his career with CFBB, Traoré signed with AS Monaco of the LNB Pro A on 7 July 2021.

In early 2022, Traoré was loaned to ALM Évreux of the LNB Pro B.

=== Metropolitans 92 (2022–2023) ===
On 26 July 2022, Traoré signed with Metropolitans 92 of the LNB Pro A.

=== ADA Blois (2023–2024) ===
On 23 June 2023, Traoré signed with ADA Blois of the LNB Pro A where he averaged 10.8 points, 7.3 rebounds and 1.5 assists in 25.5 minutes after playing in 33 matches.

=== Los Angeles / South Bay Lakers (2024–2025) ===
After going undrafted in the 2024 NBA draft, Traoré signed a two-way contract with the Los Angeles Lakers on 5 July 2024. In nine appearances for Los Angeles, Traoré averaged 1.6 points, 1.7 rebounds, and 0.1 assists. He was waived by the Lakers on 5 February 2025.

=== Bàsquet Manresa (2025) ===
Traoré signed with Bàsquet Manresa of the Liga ACB on 25 February 2025.

=== ASVEL (2025–2026) ===
On 23 July 2025, Traoré signed with LDLC ASVEL of the LNB Élite.

=== Ratiopharm Ulm (2026–present) ===
On June 24, 2026, he signed with Ratiopharm Ulm of the Basketball Bundesliga (BBL).

== Career statistics ==
Legend
GP	Games played	GS	Games started	MPG	Minutes per game
FG%	Field goal percentage	3P%	3-point field goal percentage	FT%	Free throw percentage
RPG	Rebounds per game	APG	Assists per game	SPG	Steals per game
BPG	Blocks per game	PPG	Points per game	**Bold**	Career high

=== NBA ===
Year	Team	GP	GS	MPG	FG%	3P%	FT%	RPG	APG	SPG	BPG	PPG
2024–25	L.A. Lakers	9	0	7.4	.316	.000	.286	1.7	.1	.4	.2	1.6
Career		9	0	7.4	.316	.000	.286	1.7	.1	.4	.2	1.6
