= Jalen Hood-Schifino =

American basketball player (born 2003)

Free agent
- Position: Point guard / shooting guard

Personal information
- Born: June 19, 2003 (age 23) Pittsburgh, Pennsylvania, U.S.
- Listed height: 6 ft 5 in (1.96 m)
- Listed weight: 210 lb (95 kg)

Career information
- High school: Northside Christian Academy (Charlotte, North Carolina); Combine Academy (Lincolnton, North Carolina); Montverde Academy (Montverde, Florida)
- College: Indiana (2022–2023)
- NBA draft: 2023: 1st round, 17th overall pick
- Drafted by: Los Angeles Lakers
- Playing career: 2023–present

Career history
- 2023–2025: Los Angeles Lakers
- 2023–2024: →South Bay Lakers
- 2025: Philadelphia 76ers
- 2025: →Delaware Blue Coats

Career highlights
- NBA Cup champion (2023); Big Ten Freshman of the Year (2023); Big Ten All-Freshman Team (2023); Second-team All-Big Ten (2023)
- Stats at NBA.com
- Stats at Basketball Reference

Jalen Hood-Schifino (/ˈhʊd ʃɪˈfiːnoʊ/ HUUD shif-EE-noh; born June 19, 2003) is an American professional basketball player who last played for the Philadelphia 76ers of the National Basketball Association (NBA), on a two-way contract with the Delaware Blue Coats of the NBA G League. He played college basketball for the Indiana Hoosiers. He was a five-star and four-star recruit and one of the top players in the 2022 class.

== High school career ==
Hood-Schifino played for three different programs in high school. He began his prep career at Northside Christian Academy in Charlotte, North Carolina. As a sophomore, Hood-Schifino played at Combine Academy in Lincolnton, North Carolina. Before his junior season, Hood-Schifino transferred to national powerhouse Montverde Academy in Florida, coached by Kevin Boyle. At Montverde, Hood-Schifino won back-to-back GEICO High School Basketball National titles (2021 and 2022).

Hood-Schifino was named an all-star and invited to play in the Jordan Brand Classic, where he scored 14 points and hit three three-point shots. In the off-season, prior to college he also played for coach Norton Hurd IV and Team Thad, an AAU program founded by NBA player Thaddeus Young. He spent time working out in California with professionals, including the Los Angeles Clippers’ Paul George.

Hood-Schifino stated that his time at Montverde prepared him for college basketball, noting, "The everyday grind at Montverde, people don’t really know what’s, you know, put into it, like the practices. It's almost like a college practice; you're practicing three-plus hours every day, so it really prepared me for now. . . Now going through college, it’s almost like I’m at Montverde but at a college level."

=== Recruiting ===
While playing at the Combine Academy, Hood-Schifino committed to play for Jeff Capel and Pittsburgh. At the time, it was considered a major recruiting win for the Panthers to land Hood-Schifino, a Pittsburgh native. But following Hood-Schifino's sophomore year in high school, he chose to reopen his recruitment. The Indiana Hoosiers became involved in Hood-Schifino's recruitment in the summer of 2021, just months after head coach Mike Woodson began in Bloomington. Hood-Schifino committed to the Hoosiers in August 2021. He was the highest-rated recruit to sign with the Hoosiers since Romeo Langford in 2018 and the 9th highest-ranked recruit for the program since 1998.

College recruiting
| Name | Hometown | School | Height | Weight | Commit date |
|---|---|---|---|---|---|
| Jalen Hood-Schifino; PG / SG | Pittsburgh, PA | Montverde Academy (FL) | 6 ft 6 in (1.98 m) | 215 lb (98 kg) | Aug 24, 2021 |
| Jalen Hood-Schifino; PG / SG | Recruit ratings: Rivals: 247Sports: ESPN: (89) | | | | |
Overall recruit ranking: Rivals: 18 247Sports: 26 ESPN: 26
Note: In many cases, Scout, Rivals, 247Sports, On3, and ESPN may conflict in their listings of height and weight.; In these cases, the average was taken. ESPN grades are on a 100-point scale.; Sources: "Indiana 2022 Basketball Commitments". Rivals.; "2022 Indiana Hoosiers Recruiting Class". ESPN.; "2022 Team Ranking". Rivals.

== College career ==
Prior to Hood-Schifino's freshman year with the Hoosiers, a mock NBA draft projected him as a first-round pick. A panel of Big Ten media named him the preseason freshman of the year in the league.

In his lone season at Indiana, Hood-Schifino was named Big Ten Freshman of the Year and third-team All-Big Ten by the coaches and media. In 32 games (32 starts), he averaged 13.5 points, 4.1 rebounds, and 3.7 assists in 33.1 minutes per game. On January 8, 2023, Hood-Schifino scored 33 points in an 84–83 loss against Northwestern at Assembly Hall, the most points by a freshman at Indiana since Eric Gordon against Chattanooga in 2007. On February 25, 2023, Hood-Schifino scored an Indiana freshman-record 35 points in a 79–71 win against Purdue at Mackey Arena.

On March 31, 2023, Hood-Schifino declared for the NBA draft, foregoing his final three years of college eligibility.

== Professional career ==
=== Los Angeles Lakers (2023–2025) ===
The Los Angeles Lakers selected Hood-Schifino with the 17th overall pick in the 2023 NBA draft.

Throughout his rookie and sophomore seasons, Hood-Schifino was assigned several times to the South Bay Lakers and on November 27, 2023, he made his NBA debut for the Lakers in a 138–94 loss to the Philadelphia 76ers. On March 21, 2024, Hood-Schifino underwent a lumbar microdiscectomy procedure, with an unknown timetable for his return.

On February 2, 2025, Hood-Schifino was traded, alongside a 2025 second round pick from the Los Angeles Lakers and another from the Dallas Mavericks, to the Utah Jazz as part of a deal that sent Luka Dončić, Maxi Kleber, Markieff Morris and cash to the Lakers while sending Max Christie, Anthony Davis, a 2029 first-round pick and cash considerations to the Mavericks. On February 7, he was waived by the Jazz without appearing in a game.

=== Philadelphia 76ers (2025) ===
On February 28, 2025, Hood-Schifino signed a two-way contract with the Philadelphia 76ers.

== Career statistics ==
Legend
| GP | Games played | GS | Games started | MPG | Minutes per game |
| FG% | Field goal percentage | 3P% | 3-point field goal percentage | FT% | Free throw percentage |
| RPG | Rebounds per game | APG | Assists per game | SPG | Steals per game |
| BPG | Blocks per game | PPG | Points per game | **Bold** | Career high |

=== NBA ===
| Year | Team | GP | GS | MPG | FG% | 3P% | FT% | RPG | APG | SPG | BPG | PPG |
|---|---|---|---|---|---|---|---|---|---|---|---|---|
| 2023–24 | L.A. Lakers | **21** | 0 | 5.2 | .222 | .133 | .600 | .6 | .4 | .1 | .1 | 1.6 |
| 2024–25 | L.A. Lakers | 2 | 0 | 7.1 | **1.000** | — | **1.000** | .5 | .5 | .0 | **.5** | 2.0 |
| 2024–25 | Philadelphia | 13 | 0 | **23.2** | .371 | **.304** | .842 | **2.0** | **2.8** | **.4** | **.5** | **7.8** |
| Career | | 36 | 0 | 11.8 | .329 | .262 | .732 | 1.1 | 1.3 | .2 | .3 | 3.9 |

=== College ===
| Year | Team | GP | GS | MPG | FG% | 3P% | FT% | RPG | APG | SPG | BPG | PPG |
|---|---|---|---|---|---|---|---|---|---|---|---|---|
| 2022–23 | Indiana | 32 | 32 | 33.1 | .417 | .333 | .776 | 4.1 | 3.7 | .8 | .3 | 13.5 |

== Personal life ==
Hood-Schifino is the son of Glenn Hood (formerly a quarterback at Santa Monica College) and Adrianne "Angel" Hood-Schifino, who played basketball at Lock Haven University. The family was originally in Pittsburgh, but moved to Charlotte while Hood-Schifino was in middle school. He also attended Gateway School District until he moved. Growing up, he played basketball in his grandparents' backyard and played against his older cousins, Sherron and DeAndre Schifino. DeAndre would end up being a member of the University of Pittsburgh's football team. Sherron Schifino would end up playing college basketball. Sherron and DeAndre Schifino's friends — who were also older than Hood-Schifino — played with them, too. "I was always the young kid," Hood-Schifino later explained.

As part of a student athlete compensation package to raise awareness for Indiana charity partners, Hood-Schifino endorsed Big Brothers Big Sisters of Central Indiana, offering in-person appearances (such as speaking, presentation of skills, autograph sessions, and the like) as well as social media posts promoting these appearances and the charity.

His uncle Drew played college basketball for the West Virginia Mountaineers and the California Vulcans, before embarking on a professional career. Another uncle, Jake Schifino, played in the NFL for the Tennessee Titans.
