= 2024–25 Phoenix Suns season =

Professional basketball season

- Head coach: Mike Budenholzer
- General manager: James Jones
- Owners: Mat Ishbia & Justin Ishbia
- Arena: PHX Arena (Note: Previously known and operated as the Footprint Center until February 18, 2025.)

Results
- Record: 36–46 (.439)
- Place: Division: 5th (Pacific); Conference: 11th (Western)
- Playoff finish: Did not qualify
- Stats at Basketball Reference

Local media
- Television: Arizona's Family Sports (Note: KTVK, KPHO-TV, KOLD-TV, KPHE-LD, KAZF, KAZS); FuboTV (Note: Albuquerque, New Mexico); Kiswe (Suns Live)
- Radio: KTAR

The 2024–25 Phoenix Suns season was the 57th season of the franchise in the National Basketball Association (NBA), as well as their 32nd season at the PHX Arena, formerly known as the Footprint Center until the arena's namesake expired on February 18, 2025 during a road trip in the season. It was also their second full season under the ownership group led by Mat Ishbia and Justin Ishbia after the brothers purchased the team on February 8, 2023, and their second and final season with their "Big Three" superteam of Devin Booker, Kevin Durant, and Bradley Beal together. This was their second season in a row with a new head coach taking over since Monty Williams' firing following the announcement of Frank Vogel's firing on May 9, 2024, this time having 2021 NBA Finals champion coach Mike Budenholzer taking over as the new head coach two days later. This is also their first season since the 2019–20 season where the Suns would properly utilize the NBA G League again with their own squad (this time, the Valley Suns) after previously selling the Northern Arizona Suns to the Detroit Pistons during that season's suspension/reinstatement period and subsequently shutting down that G League team for the following season afterward in a move unrelated to their sale, thus marking the first time where every NBA team would utilize their own G League affiliate during a season. Entering this season, the Suns looked to enter the playoffs for the fifth straight season after previously missing the playoffs for a decade straight and at least improve upon their first round sweeping exit from the last postseason after failing to improve upon their previous season's record.

Before training camp began, on September 21, 2024, long-time broadcaster Al McCoy would pass away peacefully at 91 years old, with his final public appearance being when he helped introduce coach Mike Budenholzer to the public. On September 30, the day training camp began for the Suns, owner Mat Ishbia announced the Suns would dedicate this season to Al McCoy, with them wearing a black patch with the word "Al" written on it on their jerseys for every game this season. For their season opener, the Suns would spoil the new arena home opener of Intuit Dome for the Los Angeles Clippers in a tense 116–113 overtime win. In only six games, the Suns would already best their 10-game mark from last season with a 5–1 record. However, an injury to Kevin Durant (and a later injury to Bradley Beal) would delay them getting their 10th win of the season until November 26 against the Los Angeles Lakers after starting the season out with a 8–1 and then 9–2 record. By the 20 game mark of the season, the Suns would tie their mark from last season with a 12–8 record. On December 16, 2024, "The Original Sun" Dick Van Arsdale would pass away at 81 years old to kidney failure. By the end of 2024, the Suns would see themselves with a worse record entering 2025 than by that same point last season at 15–17. In the aftermath to their first game in 2025, the team made a significant change to their starting line-up by moving shooting guard Bradley Beal to the bench (akin to his more natural shooting guard role) for small forward Ryan Dunn and placing center Jusuf Nurkić on the bench (while later not playing him altogether) for Mason Plumlee, with rookie center/power forward Oso Ighodaro also receiving more playing time as well. This change would help get the team back to an average record again on January 12. They would maintain an above-average record again by the halfway point of the season six days later on January 18, just days after trading for center Nick Richards. However, after appearing to get things back on track by the end of January with a 10-5 month, chaos would unfold upon the team once again by February. Repeated failures to acquire Jimmy Butler from the Miami Heat included the rumored inclusion of Kevin Durant being exchanged in the package -instead of Bradley Beal) - in a would-be reunion with the Golden State Warriors. Josh Okogie and Jusuf Nurkić would ultimately be traded to the Charlotte Hornets in separate deals in order to gain draft future draft flexibility. Coach Mike Budenholzer was perceived to have lost control of his roster during a 3-10 stretch in February. Following a 149–141 overtime loss to the Denver Nuggets on March 7, the Suns would fail to improve upon the previous season's overall record. On April 9, the Suns were officially eliminated from playoff contention for the first time since 2020. They were the last team in either conference to be eliminated following their loss to the Oklahoma City Thunder. On April 14, one day following the conclusion of their regular season, head coach Mike Budenholzer was fired from his position following the team's disappointing season. He was eventually replaced by Cleveland Cavaliers assistant coach Jordan Ott months later in June. It was the fourth time in the last seven years dating back to 2018 that a Suns coach did not continue into their 2nd season including Vogel, Igor Kokoskov, and Jay Triano.

With the seven-team megadeal proposed to send Kevin Durant to the Houston Rockets official on July 6 - alongside the intention to potentially buyout Bradley Beal's contract - it was considered the end of the Suns' failed "superteam" experiment.

== Off-season ==
=== Draft ===
Round	Pick	Player	Position(s)	Nationality	College / Club
1	28	Ryan Dunn	SF/PF	United States	Virginia
2	40	Oso Ighodaro	C/PF	United States	Marquette

The Suns entered this draft period (which would last for two days instead of just one day like it was ever since the NBA draft was only two rounds long back in 1989) with only their own first-round pick (that was made 22nd after a tiebreaker with two other teams with the same record as them and that they also kept as their own pick following multiple trades revolving around a first-round pick swap that they made last season) after also trading away their own second-round pick this year as a part of their massive Bradley Beal trade from last season. They also originally had a second-round pick that was from the Denver Nuggets (which would have been made late into the second-round) that they acquired from the Orlando Magic the previous season, but that pick was ultimately vacated from them early on into that season after the NBA discovered the Suns had engaged in conversations with then-Portland Trail Blazers center Drew Eubanks before that season's free agency period officially began. They also held draft rights to the San Antonio Spurs' second-round pick as well had it fallen into a certain condition due to a previous trade involving Cameron Payne, but that pick would not be conveyed to them due to the Spurs performing far below expectations of that draft pick's range limitations. On the first night of the 2024 NBA draft, the Suns traded their only pick they had at the time (which became Dayton power forward DaRon Holmes II) to the Denver Nuggets in exchange for their 28th pick in the draft (which became Virginia forward Ryan Dunn), their 56th pick in the draft (which became Kansas shooting guard Kevin McCullar Jr.), and two future second-round picks in 2026 and 2031. On the second day of the draft, the Suns would later trade Kevin McCullar Jr., the 56th pick, and the Boston Celtics' protected 2028 second-round pick to the New York Knicks in exchange for the 40th pick in the draft (which became the Arizona born and raised Marquette power forward/center Oso Ighodaro).

=== Coaching changes ===
On April 16, 2024, assistant coach Kevin Young was hired as a head coach for Brigham Young University's men's basketball team (though he would stay for the team's brief 2024 playoff run) after their previous coach, Mark Pope, left BYU to be the new head coach for the University of Kentucky, replacing John Calipari there after he left them for the University of Arkansas. Young had previous hints of leaving for a head coaching position with him being considered a serious candidate for the head coach position for both the Brooklyn Nets and Charlotte Hornets before being hired by BYU. He was also the highest paid assistant coach at the time of his departure. On May 9, following weeks of deliberation after a disappointing first round exit against the Minnesota Timberwolves in the 2024 NBA playoffs, the Suns decided to fire head coach Frank Vogel after finishing only one season of his five-year, $31 million deal that he had originally signed with the team. Unlike the previous season's coaching search where it was an extensive one, the Suns would only look at a select few candidates to replace Vogel's position, with Holbrook, Arizona native Mike Budenholzer (the head coach won the 2021 NBA Finals over the Suns) being considered a prominent part of their new head coach search before ultimately getting the position two days later with a five-year deal worth $50 million. Vogel would later be hired as a coaching consultant for Jason Kidd and the Dallas Mavericks.

Following Budenholzer's hiring, the Suns later announced that none of Vogel's assistant coaches from last season would initially be retained for the new coaching staff led by Budenholzer this season. However, after an attempt to promote David Fizdale into a front office position later in the month instead, he was reported to return to his role as an assistant coach for the Phoenix Suns on May 29. The Suns would also look to hire Vince Legarza, a former assistant coach with the Milwaukee Bucks and Minnesota Timberwolves, on May 28 (with Legarza also taking on the head coach role for the Suns' Summer League team). On May 30, Utah Jazz assistant coach Chad Forcier would be named the next addition to the Phoenix Suns' coaching staff. A day after that, on May 31, former Wisconsin Herd head coach Chaisson Allen would be the next assistant coach to be hired onto Budenholzer's new staff. On June 11, the former University of Washington basketball coach Mike Hopkins would be reported as the next hiring for Budenholzer's coaching staff. Over a month later, on July 23, Brent Barry, the San Antonio Spurs' Vice President of Basketball Operations, was reported to be the most recent hiring for Budenholzer's coaching staff. A day after that, former Washington Wizards assistant coach James Posey would take on one of the open assistant coach spots for the team. Finally, the Suns would announce their official coaching staff joining alongside Mike Budenholzer on August 6, with the last addition being former Los Angeles Lakers assistant coach Schuyler Rimmer.

=== Front office changes ===
In addition to coaching staff changes, the Suns also expressed interest in modifying their front office up a bit as well. Initially, assistant coach David Fizdale was offered a front office position with the team on May 12, 2024, following an initial firing from Frank Vogel's coaching staff, but he ultimately denied the job promotion in favor of staying with the Suns as an assistant coach for Mike Budenholzer's staff. Five days after trying to get Fizdale into a front office role, it was reported that the Suns would offer former Long Island Nets general manager and then-current Brooklyn Nets vice president of strategy member Matt Tellem (son of famous sports agent Arn Tellem) a key spot on their new front office instead. Matt Tellem would eventually be announced as a new assistant general manager for the Suns (with both Trevor Bukstein (who had previously been a part of their staff since 2013) and Morgan Cato being confirmed to not return to the front office as of May 21) on June 10, with former University of South Florida basketball coach Brian Gregory being named the vice president of player programming alongside the hiring of Tellem. Over a month later, on July 19, assistant general manager Gerald Madkins, personnel evaluation manager David Sevush, and team scouts Charles Payne and Darrel Johnson were announced to not return to the team's front office.

=== Free agency and Trades ===
Entering free agency, Bol Bol, Royce O'Neale, Isaiah Thomas, and Thaddeus Young would all become unrestricted free agents, though O'Neale was considered very likely to earn a contract extension before June 29 in order to take himself off the market similar to that of Grayson Allen earlier in the year (albeit for less money due to him being traded to Phoenix in February last season). In addition to them, Drew Eubanks, Eric Gordon, Damion Lee, and Josh Okogie all held player options that they would need to pick up sometime before June 29 in order to avoid free agency, though they all decided to enter free agency by the 29th. Also joining the other players in free agency were the team's two-way contracts from last season in Saben Lee, Udoka Azubuike, and Ish Wainright, though two of those three players would be ineligible for a new two-way contract due to them already being in the NBA for four seasons now. They also had salary cap holds on the recently retired Terrence Ross and former two-way contract player Gabriel Lundberg since the Suns hadn't renounced their player rights on the salary cap yet. Starting on June 18, the day after the 2024 NBA Finals ended, teams like the Suns would start talking with their own free agents in order to get potential agreements ready for them early before they signed new deals on July 6. Also, starting on June 30, the Suns were one of a select few teams to be fully restricted by the NBA's newer second tax apron limitations, which would implement greater restrictions on teams that had a payroll of over $190 million during the previous season.

On July 2, 2024, the Suns would officially sign former Denver Nuggets guard Collin Gillespie and Baylor University forward Jalen Bridges to two of their open two-way contract spots for the season. A day after that, both Mason Plumlee of the Los Angeles Clippers and Monté Morris of the Minnesota Timberwolves would officially sign one-year veteran's minimum contracts worth $3,303,771 and $2,800,834 respectively to join the team early due to the type of contracts they would sign, with Damion Lee also officially signing a one-year veteran's minimum deal worth $2.8 million to return to the team himself and help alleviate the team's tax penalties a bit for this season. On July 6, Royce O'Neale would officially re-sign with the Suns on a four-year deal worth $44 million (though $2 million would come from bonuses that are considered unlikely). A day after that, Bol Bol would officially re-sign with the Suns on a one-year veteran's minimum deal as well, with a chance to be eligible for a greater deal with Phoenix the next upcoming season due to them gaining his Early Bird rights. On July 10, both Ish Wainright and Eric Gordon would officially sign new contracts to play for the Hapoel Tel Aviv B.C. in Israel and the Philadelphia 76ers respectively. On July 13, the Suns would potentially get their last player from last season's roster returning to them via free agency by re-signing Josh Okogie on a two-year deal worth $16 million. On July 29, the Suns would officially trade David Roddy to the Atlanta Hawks for E. J. Liddell, who they plan to waive following the official signing of Washington Wizards point guard Tyus Jones to a one-year veteran's minimum deal worth $3,303,771. Then, to round out their initial roster, on August 2, the Suns would sign Milwaukee Bucks point guard TyTy Washington Jr. to their last open two-way contract spot.

After first reported as one of the first official removals from the team since free agency first began, Drew Eubanks would officially sign a new contract with the Utah Jazz on August 12. A week after that, Udoka Azubuike would officially sign an overseas contract with the KK Budućnost Podgorica VOLI out in Montenegro. On August 27, it was not only confirmed that Saben Lee would play for Turkey's Manisa Basket (albeit only briefly at first), but it was also confirmed that the Suns would officially waive both E. J. Liddell and Nassir Little from their team as well. With Little's removal from the team in particular, the remainder of his now-three year deal worth $21,750,000 would now be paid by the Suns by an average of $3,107,143 per year throughout the next seven seasons, including this season until the end of the 2030–31 season. E. J. Liddell later signed with the Chicago Bulls on September 7 before having his training camp deal converted to a two-way contract with their Windy City Bulls affiliate on October 18, while Nassir Little would officially sign a one-year deal with the Miami Heat on September 24, though he'd be waived on October 19 after the end of the preseason, but would join the Sioux Falls Skyforce G League affiliate team on October 28. By the end of the preseason, both Isaiah Thomas and Thaddeus Young would not find new teams to sign up with, either in the NBA or elsewhere. Meanwhile, the Suns would sign the likes of undrafted rookies Tyrese Samuel and Moses Wood (with Boo Buie initially included before he later signed with the New York Knicks), Valley Suns acquired players Jaden Shackelford, Mamadi Diakite, David Stockton (son of Hall of Famer John Stockton), and Paul Watson, and Frank Kaminsky (who would return to the Suns for a third time and for four seasons now) for training camp and/or preseason purposes, with every one of those players being waived from the team by October 19 and having options to sign with the Valley Suns affiliate team afterward (with every one of those players that signed during that time outside of Frank Kaminsky joining the Valley Suns not long after that). As such, the Suns would leave their final roster spot open for the start of the regular season.

On January 15, 2025, after nearing the halfway point of their season with a below-average record, the Suns would trade Nigerian-American small forward Josh Okogie and the three second-round picks they held by this point in time (their own 2031 second-round pick and the 2026 and 2031 second-round picks they acquired from the Denver Nuggets earlier this season) to the Charlotte Hornets in exchange for Jamaican center Nick Richards, a 2025 second-round pick from either the Denver Nuggets or Philadelphia 76ers (depending on who finishes with a better record to end the season), and a traded player exception worth over $3 million in order to improve their efforts at the center position. Six days later, on January 21, the Suns would trade their 2031 unprotected first-round pick to the Utah Jazz in exchange for three different first-round picks that the Jazz acquired in previous trades, all of which would be considered the weakest selections of the allowed picks they traded to Phoenix. The first-round selections traded to Phoenix that day would involve the weakest 2025 first-round picks between the Cleveland Cavaliers and Minnesota Timberwolves that Utah had acquired from previous trades involving their former star players in Donovan Mitchell and Rudy Gobert respectively, the weakest 2027 first-round selection between the Cavaliers, Timberwolves, and Jazz themselves, and the weakest 2029 first-round selection between Cleveland, Minnesota, and Utah themselves.

=== Arena Name rebrand ===
On February 18, 2025, it was announced that the arena would be seeking a new naming rights partner and would no longer go by the Footprint Center. It will temporarily be called PHX Arena, but Footprint would remain a sustainability partner with the Suns and Mercury. Earlier, workers had been seen removing Footprint Center signage, upon receiving word that the deal had expired.

== Roster ==
2024–25 Phoenix Suns roster
Players

Pos.	No.	Player	Height	Weight	DOB	From
G	8	Grayson Allen	6 ft 4 in (1.93 m)	198 lb (90 kg)	1995-10-08	Duke
G	3	Bradley Beal	6 ft 4 in (1.93 m)	207 lb (94 kg)	1993-06-28	Florida
F/C	11	Bol Bol	7 ft 3 in (2.21 m)	220 lb (100 kg)	1999-11-16	Oregon
G	1	Devin Booker	6 ft 6 in (1.98 m)	206 lb (93 kg)	1996-10-30	Kentucky
F	15	Jalen Bridges (TW)	6 ft 8 in (2.03 m)	225 lb (102 kg)	2001-05-14	Baylor
G/F	0	Ryan Dunn	6 ft 8 in (2.03 m)	216 lb (98 kg)	2003-01-07	Virginia
F	35	Kevin Durant	6 ft 11 in (2.11 m)	240 lb (109 kg)	1988-09-29	Texas
G	12	Collin Gillespie (TW)	6 ft 1 in (1.85 m)	195 lb (88 kg)	1999-06-25	Villanova
F/C	4	Oso Ighodaro	7 ft 0 in (2.13 m)	235 lb (107 kg)	2002-07-14	Marquette
G	21	Tyus Jones	6 ft 1 in (1.85 m)	196 lb (89 kg)	1996-05-10	Duke
G/F	10	Damion Lee	6 ft 6 in (1.98 m)	210 lb (95 kg)	1992-10-21	Louisville
F	17	Cody Martin	6 ft 6 in (1.98 m)	205 lb (93 kg)	1995-09-28	Nevada
G	18	Vasilije Micić	6 ft 3 in (1.91 m)	188 lb (85 kg)	1994-01-13	Serbia
G	23	Monté Morris	6 ft 2 in (1.88 m)	183 lb (83 kg)	1995-06-27	Iowa State
F	00	Royce O'Neale	6 ft 6 in (1.98 m)	226 lb (103 kg)	1993-06-05	Baylor
C	22	Mason Plumlee	6 ft 10 in (2.08 m)	254 lb (115 kg)	1990-03-05	Duke
C	2	Nick Richards	7 ft 0 in (2.13 m)	245 lb (111 kg)	1997-11-29	Kentucky
G	14	TyTy Washington Jr. (TW)	6 ft 3 in (1.91 m)	195 lb (88 kg)	2001-11-15	Kentucky

Coaches
Head coach
- Mike Budenholzer
Assistant(s)
- Chaisson Allen
- Brent Barry
- David Fizdale
- Chad Forcier
- Mike Hopkins
- Vince Legarza
- James Posey
- Schuyler Rimmer

Legend
- (DP) Unsigned draft pick
- (FA) Free agent
- (S) Suspended
- (GL) On assignment to G League affiliate
- (TW) Two-way affiliate player
- Injured

Roster
Updated: January 29, 2025

== Standings ==
=== Division ===
Pacific Division	W	L	PCT	GB	Home	Road	Div	GP
y – Los Angeles Lakers	50	32	.610	–	31‍–‍10	19‍–‍22	12‍–‍4	82
x – Los Angeles Clippers	50	32	.610	–	30‍–‍11	20‍–‍21	9‍–‍7	82
x – Golden State Warriors	48	34	.585	2.0	24‍–‍17	24‍–‍17	5‍–‍11	82
pi – Sacramento Kings	40	42	.488	10.0	20‍–‍21	20‍–‍21	5‍–‍11	82
Phoenix Suns	36	46	.439	14.0	24‍–‍17	12‍–‍29	9‍–‍7	82

=== Conference ===
Western Conference
#	Team	W	L	PCT	GB	GP
1	z – Oklahoma City Thunder *	68	14	.829	–	82
2	y – Houston Rockets *	52	30	.634	16.0	82
3	y – Los Angeles Lakers *	50	32	.610	18.0	82
4	x – Denver Nuggets	50	32	.610	18.0	82
5	x – Los Angeles Clippers	50	32	.610	18.0	82
6	x – Minnesota Timberwolves	49	33	.598	19.0	82
7	x – Golden State Warriors	48	34	.585	20.0	82
8	x – Memphis Grizzlies	48	34	.585	20.0	82
9	pi – Sacramento Kings	40	42	.488	28.0	82
10	pi – Dallas Mavericks	39	43	.476	29.0	82
11	Phoenix Suns	36	46	.439	32.0	82
12	Portland Trail Blazers	36	46	.439	32.0	82
13	San Antonio Spurs	34	48	.415	34.0	82
14	New Orleans Pelicans	21	61	.256	47.0	82
15	Utah Jazz	17	65	.207	51.0	82

== Game log ==
=== Preseason ===
2024 preseason game log
Total: 3–2 (Home: 0–2; Road: 3–0)
Preseason: 3–2 (home: 0–2; road: 3–0)

Game	Date	Team	Score	High points	High rebounds	High assists	Location Attendance	Record
1	October 6	@ L.A. Lakers	W 118–114	Josh Okogie (15)	Bol Bol (6)	Tyus Jones (6)	Acrisure Arena; 9,494	1–0
2	October 8	@ Detroit	W 105–97	Kevin Durant (21)	Oso Ighodaro (7)	Tyus Jones (7)	Breslin Center; 14,901	2–0
3	October 11	Detroit	L 91–109	Kevin Durant (18)	Bol Bol (8)	Mason Plumlee (4)	Footprint Center; 17,071	2–1
4	October 13	@ Denver	W 118–114	Ryan Dunn, Monté Morris (20)	Bol Bol (8)	Monté Morris (7)	Ball Arena; 17,310	3–1
5	October 17	L.A. Lakers	L 122–128 (OT)	Devin Booker (22)	Kevin Durant, Royce O'Neale, Mason Plumlee (8)	Kevin Durant (8)	Footprint Center; 17,071	3–2

2024–25 preseason schedule

=== Regular season ===
2024–25 game log
Total: 36–46 (Home: 24–17; Road: 12–29)
October: 4–1 (home: 2–0; road: 2–1)

Game	Date	Team	Score	High points	High rebounds	High assists	Location Attendance	Record
1	October 23	@ L.A. Clippers	W 116–113 (OT)	Kevin Durant (25)	Jusuf Nurkić (9)	Tyus Jones (8)	Intuit Dome; 18,300	1–0
2	October 25	@ L.A. Lakers	L 116–123	Kevin Durant (30)	Nurkić, Plumlee (7)	Bradley Beal (9)	Crypto.com Arena; 18,997	1–1
3	October 26	Dallas	W 114–102	Kevin Durant (31)	Jusuf Nurkić (14)	Tyus Jones (7)	Footprint Center; 17,071	2–1
4	October 28	L.A. Lakers	W 109–105	Devin Booker (33)	Mason Plumlee (10)	Tyus Jones (5)	Footprint Center; 17,071	3–1
5	October 31	@ L.A. Clippers	W 125–119	Devin Booker (40)	Royce O'Neale (7)	Tyus Jones (11)	Intuit Dome; 16,827	4–1

November: 7–7 (home: 5–4; road: 2–3)

Game	Date	Team	Score	High points	High rebounds	High assists	Location Attendance	Record
6	November 2	Portland	W 103–97	Devin Booker (28)	Jusuf Nurkić (15)	Devin Booker (9)	Footprint Center; 17,071	5–1
7	November 4	Philadelphia	W 118–116	Kevin Durant (35)	Jusuf Nurkić (15)	Booker, Durant (6)	Footprint Center; 17,071	6–1
8	November 6	Miami	W 115–112	Kevin Durant (32)	Jusuf Nurkić (18)	Devin Booker (9)	Footprint Center; 17,071	7–1
9	November 8	@ Dallas	W 114–113	Kevin Durant (26)	Jusuf Nurkić (10)	Devin Booker (12)	American Airlines Center; 20,277	8–1
10	November 10	Sacramento	L 118–127 (OT)	Bradley Beal (28)	Mason Plumlee (11)	Devin Booker (12)	Footprint Center; 17,071	8–2
11	November 12	@ Utah	W 120–112	Devin Booker (31)	Mason Plumlee (14)	Tyus Jones (7)	Delta Center; 18,175	9–2
12	November 13	@ Sacramento	L 104–127	Josh Okogie (25)	Jusuf Nurkić (11)	Tyus Jones (8)	Golden 1 Center; 16,204	9–3
13	November 15	@ Oklahoma City	L 83–99	Josh Okogie (15)	Josh Okogie (9)	Devin Booker (4)	Paycom Center; 18,203	9–4
14	November 17	@ Minnesota	L 117–120	Devin Booker (44)	Mason Plumlee (8)	Tyus Jones (11)	Target Center; 18,978	9–5
15	November 18	Orlando	L 99–109	Tyus Jones (18)	Mason Plumlee (11)	Tyus Jones (8)	Footprint Center; 17,071	9–6
16	November 20	New York	L 122–138	Devin Booker (33)	Jusuf Nurkić (12)	Tyus Jones (10)	Footprint Center; 17,071	9–7
17	November 26	L.A. Lakers	W 127–100	Devin Booker (26)	Jusuf Nurkić (12)	Devin Booker (10)	Footprint Center; 17,071	10–7
18	November 27	Brooklyn	L 117–127	Devin Booker (31)	Kevin Durant (8)	Tyus Jones (12)	Footprint Center; 17,071	10–8
19	November 30	Golden State	W 113–105	Devin Booker (27)	Kevin Durant (10)	Booker, Jones (9)	Footprint Center; 17,071	11–8

December: 4–9 (home: 3–4; road: 1–5)

Game	Date	Team	Score	High points	High rebounds	High assists	Location Attendance	Record
20	December 3	San Antonio	W 104–93	Devin Booker (29)	Beal, Booker (9)	Devin Booker (5)	Footprint Center; 17,071	12–8
21	December 5	@ New Orleans	L 124–126	Devin Booker (28)	Mason Plumlee (10)	Grayson Allen (10)	Smoothie King Center; 16,365	12–9
22	December 7	@ Miami	L 111–121	Royce O'Neale (23)	Mason Plumlee (11)	Devin Booker (7)	Kaseya Center; 19,600	12–10
23	December 8	@ Orlando	L 110–115	Devin Booker (25)	Royce O'Neale (7)	Devin Booker (7)	Kia Center; 18,311	12–11
24	December 13	@ Utah	W 134–126	Devin Booker (34)	Mason Plumlee (9)	Tyus Jones (11)	Delta Center; 18,175	13–11
25	December 15	Portland	W 116–109	Devin Booker (28)	Jusuf Nurkić (14)	Kevin Durant (7)	Footprint Center; 17,071	14–11
26	December 19	Indiana	L 111–120	Kevin Durant (37)	Allen, Durant, Nurkić (10)	Tyus Jones (7)	Footprint Center; 17,071	14–12
27	December 21	Detroit	L 125–133	Kevin Durant (43)	Mason Plumlee (9)	Durant, Nurkić (6)	Footprint Center; 17,071	14–13
28	December 23	@ Denver	L 90–117	Beal, Durant (23)	Kevin Durant (9)	Nurkić, O'Neale (4)	Ball Arena; 19,910	14–14
29	December 25	Denver	W 110–100	Beal, Durant (27)	Jusuf Nurkić (13)	Durant, Nurkić, O'Neale (6)	Footprint Center; 17,071	15–14
30	December 27	Dallas	L 89–98	Kevin Durant (35)	Mason Plumlee (9)	Tyus Jones (6)	Footprint Center; 17,071	15–15
31	December 28	@ Golden State	L 105–109	Kevin Durant (31)	Okogie, Plumlee (9)	Jones, Plumlee (6)	Chase Center; 18,064	15–16
32	December 31	Memphis	L 112–117	Kevin Durant (29)	Kevin Durant (10)	Devin Booker (9)	Footprint Center; 17,071	15–17

January: 10–5 (home: 5–1; road: 5–4)

Game	Date	Team	Score	High points	High rebounds	High assists	Location Attendance	Record
33	January 4	@ Indiana	L 108–126	Kevin Durant (25)	Devin Booker (8)	Devin Booker (9)	Gainbridge Fieldhouse; 17,274	15–18
34	January 6	@ Philadelphia	W 109–99	Bradley Beal (25)	Nurkić, Plumlee (7)	Devin Booker (10)	Wells Fargo Center; 19,791	16–18
35	January 7	@ Charlotte	L 104–115	Devin Booker (39)	Mason Plumlee (12)	Devin Booker (10)	Spectrum Center; 16,647	16–19
36	January 9	Atlanta	W 123–115	Bradley Beal (25)	Mason Plumlee (10)	Devin Booker (12)	Footprint Center; 17,071	17–19
37	January 11	Utah	W 114–106	Devin Booker (34)	Mason Plumlee (10)	Kevin Durant (7)	Footprint Center; 17,071	18–19
38	January 12	Charlotte	W 120–113	Devin Booker (30)	Kevin Durant (8)	Devin Booker (8)	Footprint Center; 17,071	19–19
39	January 14	@ Atlanta	L 117–122	Devin Booker (35)	Kevin Durant (8)	Durant, Jones (6)	State Farm Arena; 16,221	19–20
40	January 16	@ Washington	W 130–123	Devin Booker (31)	Ryan Dunn (11)	Tyus Jones (10)	Capital One Arena; 15,792	20–20
41	January 18	@ Detroit	W 125–121	Kevin Durant (36)	Nick Richards (11)	Tyus Jones (10)	Little Caesars Arena; 20,062	21–20
42	January 20	@ Cleveland	L 92–118	Kevin Durant (23)	Kevin Durant (7)	Beal, Booker, Jones (4)	Rocket Mortgage FieldHouse; 19,432	21–21
43	January 22	@ Brooklyn	W 108–84	Devin Booker (32)	Nick Richards (15)	Tyus Jones (7)	Barclays Center; 17,077	22–21
44	January 25	Washington	W 119–109	Kevin Durant (29)	Nick Richards (19)	Devin Booker (7)	Footprint Center; 17,071	23–21
45	January 27	L.A. Clippers	W 111–109	Devin Booker (26)	Booker, Richards (7)	Devin Booker (8)	Footprint Center; 17,071	24–21
46	January 29	Minnesota	L 113–121	Kevin Durant (33)	Grayson Allen (7)	Devin Booker (8)	Footprint Center; 17,071	24–22
47	January 31	@ Golden State	W 130–105	Devin Booker (31)	Nick Richards (16)	Devin Booker (11)	Chase Center; 18,064	25–22

February: 3–10 (home: 2–3; road: 1–7)

Game	Date	Team	Score	High points	High rebounds	High assists	Location Attendance	Record
48	February 1	@ Portland	L 108–127	Devin Booker (37)	Nick Richards (10)	Devin Booker (5)	Moda Center; 17,421	25–23
49	February 3	@ Portland	L 119–121 (OT)	Devin Booker (34)	Mason Plumlee (12)	Durant, O'Neale (5)	Moda Center; 16,205	25–24
50	February 5	@ Oklahoma City	L 109–140	Bradley Beal (25)	Nick Richards (6)	Bradley Beal (6)	Paycom Center; 17,451	25–25
51	February 7	Utah	W 135–127 (OT)	Devin Booker (47)	Nick Richards (14)	Devin Booker (11)	Footprint Center; 17,071	26–25
52	February 8	Denver	L 105–122	Devin Booker (24)	Nick Richards (9)	Tyus Jones (10)	Footprint Center; 17,071	26–26
53	February 11	Memphis	L 112–119	Kevin Durant (34)	Bol Bol (14)	Booker, Jones (9)	Footprint Center; 17,071	26–27
54	February 12	@ Houston	L 111–119	Kevin Durant (37)	Nick Richards (13)	Kevin Durant (9)	Toyota Center; 16,227	26–28
All-Star Game
55	February 20	@ San Antonio	L 109–120	Royce O'Neale (27)	Bradley Beal (9)	Devin Booker (8)	Moody Center; 16,246	26–29
56	February 22	@ Chicago	W 121–117	Devin Booker (29)	Durant, Richards (10)	Devin Booker (8)	United Center; 21,116	27–29
57	February 23	@ Toronto	L 109–127	Devin Booker (31)	Nick Richards (8)	Devin Booker (8)	Scotiabank Arena; 18,989	27–30
58	February 25	@ Memphis	L 148–151 (OT)	Devin Booker (28)	Bol, Durant (8)	Bradley Beal (11)	FedExForum; 16,202	27–31
59	February 27	New Orleans	L 116–124	Devin Booker (36)	Nick Richards (16)	Tyus Jones (12)	PHX Arena; 17,071	27–32
60	February 28	New Orleans	W 125–108	Bol Bol (25)	Nick Richards (12)	Devin Booker (9)	PHX Arena; 17,071	28–32

March: 7–8 (home: 6–3; road: 1–5)

Game	Date	Team	Score	High points	High rebounds	High assists	Location Attendance	Record
61	March 2	Minnesota	L 98–116	Kevin Durant (26)	Bol Bol (11)	Devin Booker (5)	PHX Arena; 17,071	28–33
62	March 4	L.A. Clippers	W 119–117	Kevin Durant (34)	Durant, Richards (7)	Devin Booker (8)	PHX Arena; 17,071	29–33
63	March 7	@ Denver	L 141–149 (OT)	Devin Booker (34)	Mason Plumlee (11)	Bradley Beal (9)	Ball Arena; 19,808	29–34
64	March 9	@ Dallas	W 125–116	Devin Booker (24)	Durant, Richards (9)	Kevin Durant (8)	American Airlines Center; 20,013	30–34
65	March 10	@ Memphis	L 118–120	Kevin Durant (35)	Nick Richards (12)	Tyus Jones (7)	FedExForum; 16,545	30–35
66	March 12	@ Houston	L 104–111	Bradley Beal (25)	Kevin Durant (7)	Royce O'Neale (8)	Toyota Center; 18,055	30–36
67	March 14	Sacramento	W 122–106	Booker, Durant (22)	Oso Ighodaro (6)	Devin Booker (13)	PHX Arena; 17,071	31–36
68	March 16	@ L.A. Lakers	L 96–107	Kevin Durant (21)	Kevin Durant (9)	Devin Booker (11)	Crypto.com Arena; 18,997	31–37
69	March 17	Toronto	W 129–89	Devin Booker (27)	Royce O'Neale (10)	Booker, Martin (6)	PHX Arena; 17,071	32–37
70	March 19	Chicago	W 127–121	Devin Booker (41)	Royce O'Neale (10)	Kevin Durant (8)	PHX Arena; 17,071	33–37
71	March 21	Cleveland	W 123–112	Kevin Durant (42)	Oso Ighodaro (13)	Devin Booker (10)	PHX Arena; 17,071	34–37
72	March 24	Milwaukee	W 108–106	Kevin Durant (38)	Nick Richards (10)	Devin Booker (12)	PHX Arena; 17,071	35–37
73	March 26	Boston	L 102–132	Kevin Durant (30)	Devin Booker (7)	Devin Booker (10)	PHX Arena; 17,071	35–38
74	March 28	@ Minnesota	L 109–124	Kevin Durant (23)	Kevin Durant (6)	Collin Gillespie (10)	Target Center; 18,978	35–39
75	March 30	Houston	L 109–148	Devin Booker (28)	Kevin Durant (7)	Collin Gillespie (4)	PHX Arena; 17,071	35–40

April: 1–6 (home: 1–2; road: 0–4)

Game	Date	Team	Score	High points	High rebounds	High assists	Location Attendance	Record
76	April 1	@ Milwaukee	L 123–133	Devin Booker (39)	Nick Richards (11)	Devin Booker (11)	Fiserv Forum; 17,341	35–41
77	April 4	@ Boston	L 103–123	Devin Booker (37)	Ighodaro, Richards (7)	Booker, Jones (6)	TD Garden; 19,156	35–42
78	April 6	@ New York	L 98–112	Devin Booker (40)	Ryan Dunn (8)	Collin Gillespie (4)	Madison Square Garden; 19,812	35–43
79	April 8	Golden State	L 95–133	Devin Booker (21)	Nick Richards (9)	Beal, Booker, Gillespie (4)	PHX Arena; 17,071	35–44
80	April 9	Oklahoma City	L 112–125	Bradley Beal (25)	Devin Booker (14)	Allen, Dunn, Gillespie (2)	PHX Arena; 17,071	35–45
81	April 11	San Antonio	W 117–98	Ryan Dunn (26)	Ryan Dunn (11)	Allen, Beal (6)	PHX Arena; 17,071	36–45
82	April 13	@ Sacramento	L 98–109	Grayson Allen (20)	Ryan Dunn (10)	Grayson Allen (5)	Golden 1 Center; 17,832	36–46

2024–25 season schedule

=== NBA Cup ===
This was the second regular season where all the NBA teams will compete in a mid-season tournament following the success of the 2023 NBA In-Season Tournament, though this season's tournament would be renamed to the Emirates NBA Cup starting this season onward. On July 12, 2024, the NBA announced the drawing of each team's groups for this season's tournament. For the Suns, they would join the rivaling Los Angeles Lakers and Utah Jazz from last season's Group A with the Oklahoma City Thunder and the rivaling San Antonio Spurs in Group B for the Western Conference this season. This time around, the Suns would not advance to the second-round despite finishing with a similar 3–1 in the NBA Cup due to not just them losing poorly in a key match against the Oklahoma City Thunder, but also not having the point differential to overcome the Dallas Mavericks in the NBA Cup.

==== West Group B ====
Pos	Team	Pld	W	L	PF	PA	PD	Qualification
1	Oklahoma City Thunder	4	3	1	437	392	+45	Advance to knockout stage
2	Phoenix Suns	4	3	1	434	404	+30	
3	Los Angeles Lakers	4	2	2	437	461	−24	
4	San Antonio Spurs	4	2	2	446	443	+3	
5	Utah Jazz	4	0	4	451	505	−54	

Source: NBA
Rules for classification: Tiebreakers

Games

Note: Times are Eastern Time (UTC−4 or UTC−5) as listed by the NBA. If the venue is located in a different time zone, the local time is also given.

NBA League Pass

November 12
9:00 P.M. (7:00 P.M. Mountain)

Recap

Phoenix Suns 120, Utah Jazz 112
Scoring by quarter: 33–21, 31–28, 23–30, 33–33
Pts: Devin Booker 31; Rebs: Mason Plumlee 14; Asts: Tyus Jones 7	Pts: John Collins 29; Rebs: John Collins 10; Asts: Jordan Clarkson 8

Delta Center, Salt Lake City, UT
Attendance: 18,175
Referees: Kevin Cutler, Josh Tiven, John Conley

NBA League Pass

November 15
8:00 P.M. (7:00 P.M. Central)

Recap

Phoenix Suns 83, Oklahoma City Thunder 99
Scoring by quarter: 14–29, 22–19, 24–35, 23–16
Pts: Josh Okogie 15; Rebs: Josh Okogie 9 Asts: Devin Booker 4	Pts: Shai Gilgeous-Alexander 28; Rebs: Luguentz Dort 9 Asts: Shai Gilgeous-Alexander 4

Paycom Center, Oklahoma City, OK
Attendance: 18,203
Referees: Matt Myers, Mitchell Ervin, Dedric Taylor

TNT

November 26
10:00 P.M. (8:00 P.M. Mountain)

Recap

Los Angeles Lakers 100, Phoenix Suns 127
Scoring by quarter: 25–31, 35–31, 18–36, 22–29
Pts: Anthony Davis 25; Rebs: Anthony Davis 15; Asts: LeBron James 10	Pts: Devin Booker 26; Rebs: Jusuf Nurkić 12; Asts: Devin Booker 10

Footprint Center, Phoenix, AZ
Attendance: 17,071
Referees: J.T. Orr, James Williams, Gediminas Petraitis

NBA League Pass

December 3
9:00 P.M. (7:00 P.M. Mountain)

Recap

San Antonio Spurs 93, Phoenix Suns 104
Scoring by quarter: 19–29, 20–23, 32–23, 22–29
Pts: Devin Vassell 25; Rebs: Victor Wembanyama 13; Asts: Chris Paul 8	Pts: Devin Booker 29; Rebs: Beal, Booker 9 each Asts: Devin Booker 5

Footprint Center, Phoenix, AZ
Attendance: 17,071
Referees: Courtney Kirkland, Nick Buchert, Brandon Schwab

== Awards, honors, and records ==
- With a 98–87 win for Team U.S.A. over the hosts in France on August 10 in the 2024 Summer Olympics, Devin Booker won his second straight Olympic gold medal and Kevin Durant won his fourth straight Olympic gold medal for men's basketball. Durant in particular would be the first basketball player to ever win four Olympic gold medals in one career.
  - Kevin Durant also broke the Olympic record for Team U.S.A. for the most points scored (previously set by Carmelo Anthony for the males and Lisa Leslie overall) and most rebounds grabbed (previously set by Carmelo Anthony) throughout an entire Olympic basketball career.
- On October 12–13, 2024, both long-time former Suns player Walter Davis and one-time former Suns player Vince Carter were officially inducted into the Naismith Basketball Hall of Fame for the Class of 2024 (Davis' induction being posthumous) alongside former Phoenix Mercury All-Star Michele Timms. The original induction period meant for August 16–17, 2024 was delayed until October due to scheduling conflicts relating to the 2024 Summer Olympics.
- Entering this season, Devin Booker became the fifth player in franchise history to spend at least a decade with the Phoenix Suns, joining the likes of Steve Nash (when combining his two stints with Phoenix together), Walter Davis, Kevin Johnson, and Alvan Adams as the only other players to accomplish such a feat. Booker would officially place his mark on October 23, 2024, in the arena opening game against the Los Angeles Clippers at Intuit Dome, recording 15 points, 4 rebounds, and 6 assists before fouling out near the end of the fourth quarter in a tense 116–113 overtime win.

=== Week/Month ===
- On November 4, 2024, Devin Booker won his tenth Player of the Week Award, winning it during the week of his 28th birthday from October 28–November 3, 2024. On that week, he would average 33.7 points on 48.4% shooting (which included a season-high 40-point performance on Halloween night at Intuit Dome, which is currently a record-high performance there), 6.3 assists, 5.7 rebounds and 1.3 steals per game during a perfect 3–0 week and a notably improved start over last season's performance thus far into the season.
- On March 24, 2025, Kevin Durant won his 33rd Player of the Week Award, winning it during the week of March 17–23, 2025. On that week, he would average 27.3 points on 58.8% shooting (including nearly perfect free-throw shooting), 6.3 assists and 4.3 rebounds during a perfect 3–0 week, which the team desperately needed during that period of time. Durant is now tied with the late Kobe Bryant for the most Player of the Week Awards received in the NBA, with their tie being behind only LeBron James' 69 total honors there.

=== All-Star ===
- On January 23, 2025, Kevin Durant was named as one of the starters from the Western Conference's fan voting alongside LeBron James and Nikola Jokić for the frontcourt and Shai Gilgeous-Alexander and Durant's former teammate, Stephen Curry, in the backcourt. This would be his 15th All-Star appearance, tying the amount of appearances made alongside former Suns center (and All-Star MVP) Shaquille O'Neal, Kevin Garnett, and Tim Duncan, as well as tying for fourth place for the most All-Star appearances behind only Kobe Bryant's 18, Kareem Abdul-Jabbar's 19, and the aforementioned LeBron James with 21 appearances now. However, the All-Star format for this year would be one that Durant himself admitted to disliking a lot himself, with it replacing the typical format of East Vs. West (or the Eastern Conference captain's team against the Western Conference captain's team) with a four team single elimination tournament format where the competing teams went for the first to 40 wins rules instead.
- On January 31, 2025, after initially missing out on being named for the Rising Stars Challenge, rookie Ryan Dunn was named the replacement player for Jared McCain of the Philadelphia 76ers to participate in the Rising Stars Challenge. Dunn would compete with "Team C" for a chance to win the single elimination tournament there against the other Rising Stars in the event and a select NBA G League team to potentially play in the actual 2025 NBA All-Star Game himself, making him a technical All-Star in that case.

=== Records ===
- On December 13, 2024, both the Phoenix Suns and Utah Jazz broke the record for the most three-pointers made in a non-overtime game, as well as tied the record for the most three-pointers made in single game with 44 made three-pointers between the two teams (22 made by both squads) in Phoenix's 134–126 win over the Jazz. The game they tied the record with was the high-scoring double-overtime thriller between the Sacramento Kings and the Los Angeles Clippers on February 24, 2023 that saw the Kings survive with a 176–175 win (the second-highest scoring game in NBA history) despite Sacramento making 18 three-pointers when compared to the Clippers' 26 three-pointers that night. However, it only tied the record for a total of two days before being broken on December 15 by the Dallas Mavericks and Golden State Warriors.

=== Team records ===
- On November 2, 2024, the Suns would shoot a new record-high 52 three-point field goal attempts (though making only 17 of them) in a 103–97 win over the Portland Trail Blazers. It would break a previous franchise record for attempts in a non-overtime game with the only game having more attempts being a double-overtime game in 2021 against the Denver Nuggets.
- On January 18, 2025, new Suns center Nick Richards became the first center in franchise history to debut with a double-double of at least 20 points and 10 rebounds while coming off the bench in a 125–121 win over the Detroit Pistons at the team's halfway point in their season.

=== Milestones ===
- During the third game of the season, on October 26, 2024, Kevin Durant became the eighth player in NBA history to reach 29,000 career points. He would surpass the mark with a three-pointer made with 7:15 left in the fourth quarter, later finishing the game with 31 total points scored in a 114–102 win over the defending Western Conference champion Dallas Mavericks in the Suns' home opener game.
- On January 6, 2025, Kevin Durant would surpass Moses Malone's combined overall scoring in both the ABA and NBA to become the newest tenth best scorer in professional basketball history when combining both the NBA & ABA together. That night, Durant would score 23 points in a 109–99 win over the Philadelphia 76ers.
- On February 11, 2025, Kevin Durant became the eighth player in NBA history to score over 30,000 points in the league (ninth overall player to reach that total if you include Julius Erving's combined scoring totals in both the ABA & NBA), with him scoring his 30,000th career point with 1:11 left to go in the third quarter to score 26 total points by then. He would finish the night with 34 points scored in a 119–112 loss to the Memphis Grizzlies that night.
- Following that special night, Durant would surpass Julius Erving's overall scoring total when combining his time in both the ABA & NBA together with 37 points scored in a 119–111 loss to the Houston Rockets. That would officially make Durant the eighth best overall scorer in professional basketball history when combining both the NBA & ABA together, never mind just the NBA on its own accord.

=== Team milestones ===
- During the second game of the season, on October 25, 2024, Devin Booker would be the sixth player in franchise history to break through the 3,000 assist barrier while with the Suns. Booker would record his 3,000th assist of his career by passing to Kevin Durant for a running lay-up with 6:33 left in the first quarter. He would join Jason Kidd, Walter Davis, Alvan Adams, Kevin Johnson, and Steve Nash as the only Suns players to reach that mark while with the franchise. Booker would end the night with 4 assists in a 123–116 loss to the Los Angeles Lakers. He also overtook Steve Nash's position as the player with the tenth most steals in franchise history with one steal that night after previously tying the mark a game earlier in the season debut.
- On Halloween night, Devin Booker would surpass Jason Kidd's assist mark with the franchise first by tying it with a pass for a Kevin Durant lay-up with 6:17 left in the first quarter and then surpassing it with a pass for a three-pointer by rookie Ryan Dunn with 7:07 left in the second quarter. Booker would end the game with 8 assists and a season-high 40 point in a 125–119 comeback win over the Los Angeles Clippers on the road. He would also surpass former power forward Larry Nance Sr. to become the newest player with the ninth most steals in franchise history with 3 steals to his name as well after previously overtaking Steve Nash's position earlier in the season.
- On December 3, 2024, Devin Booker would join Walter Davis to become the only other player in franchise history to score over 15,000 points with the Suns, as well the ninth youngest player in NBA history to reach that landmark. He would hit that mark at the start of the game with a mid-range jumpshot with 11:37 to start the game as the first basket made. Booker would later lead the entire team with 29 points, 9 rebounds, and 5 assists in a 104–93 win over the San Antonio Spurs in what ultimately became both teams' final games played in the 2024 NBA Cup.
- On February 3, 2025, Devin Booker would officially surpass Walter Davis in overall points scored while with the Phoenix Suns to become the franchise's newest leading scorer in its history. He would surpass Davis with a three-pointer made with 7:34 left in the third quarter, with the game being called for a timeout afterward in order to celebrate the moment out on the road. Unfortunately, that night would be ruined with the Suns losing by a final score of 121–119 against the Portland Trail Blazers, which included former Suns center Deandre Ayton. However, the Suns would later celebrate the occasion properly at their home arena four days later on February 7, with the team actually winning that overtime match against the Utah Jazz with a 135–127 final score.

== Injuries/Personal missed games ==
Player	Duration		Reason(s) for missed time	Games missed
Player	Start	End	Reason(s) for missed time	Games missed
Josh Okogie	October 11, 2024	November 8, 2024	Right hamstring strain	8
Grayson Allen	October 25, 2024	October 28, 2024	Birth of his daughter	2
Bradley Beal	October 26, 2024	October 28, 2024	Sore right elbow	1
Bradley Beal	October 31, 2024	November 2, 2024	Right elbow sprain	1
Ryan Dunn	November 8, 2024	Unknown	Left ankle sprain	?

== Player statistics ==
Legend
GP	Games played	GS	Games started	MPG	Minutes per game
FG%	Field-goal percentage	3P%	3-point field-goal percentage	FT%	Free-throw percentage
RPG	Rebounds per game	APG	Assists per game	SPG	Steals per game
BPG	Blocks per game	PPG	Points per game

=== Regular season ===
Phoenix Suns statistics
Player	GP	GS	MPG	FG%	3P%	FT%	RPG	APG	SPG	BPG	PPG
Grayson Allen	64	7	24.1	.448	.426	.816	3.0	2.1	.8	.3	10.6
Bradley Beal	53	38	32.1	.497	.386	.803	3.3	3.7	1.1	.5	17.0
Bol Bol	36	10	12.4	.525	.344	.769	2.9	.6	.3	.7	6.8
Devin Booker	75	75	37.2	.461	.332	.894	4.1	7.1	.9	.2	25.6
Jalen Bridges	8	0	3.8	.286	.286	.750	.5	.0	.0	.0	1.1
Ryan Dunn	74	44	19.1	.430	.311	.487	3.6	.6	.8	.5	6.9
Kevin Durant	62	62	36.5	.527	.430	.839	6.0	4.2	.8	1.2	26.6
Collin Gillespie	33	9	14.0	.430	.433	.864	2.4	2.4	.6	.2	5.9
Oso Ighodaro	61	6	17.1	.604	.000	.580	3.6	1.2	.5	.5	4.2
Tyus Jones	81	58	26.8	.448	.414	.895	2.4	5.3	.9	.1	10.2
Damion Lee	25	0	5.8	.365	.243	.952	.8	.4	.2	.0	3.3
Cody Martin^{†}	14	0	14.7	.351	.111	.750	3.4	1.1	.9	.4	3.7
Vasilije Micić^{†}	5	0	4.2				.4	.2	.0	.0	.0
Monté Morris	45	0	12.7	.426	.360	.857	1.5	1.6	.4	.1	5.2
Jusuf Nurkić^{†}	25	23	23.7	.454	.322	.696	9.2	1.9	.9	.6	8.6
Royce O'Neale	75	22	24.5	.423	.406	.731	4.7	2.2	.9	.5	9.1
Josh Okogie^{†}	25	1	14.0	.491	.381	.688	2.9	.6	.8	.4	6.0
Mason Plumlee	74	21	17.6	.619	.000	.648	6.1	1.8	.4	.6	4.5
Nick Richards^{†}	36	34	22.7	.605	.000	.822	8.6	.6	.2	.8	9.5
TyTy Washington Jr.	16	0	7.4	.311	.190	.500	.8	1.0	.2	.0	2.2

- ^{†} Denotes player spent time with another team in the season. Stats reflect time with the Suns only.

== Transactions ==
=== Trades ===
June 26, 2024	To Phoenix Suns Draft rights to Ryan Dunn (No. 28); Draft rights to Kevin McCullar Jr. (No. 56); 2026 second-round pick 2031 second-round pick	To Denver Nuggets Draft rights to DaRon Holmes II (No. 22)
June 27, 2024	To Phoenix Suns Draft rights to Oso Ighodaro (No. 40)	To New York Knicks Draft rights to Kevin McCullar Jr. (No. 56); 2028 Top-45 protected second-round pick (from Boston via Phoenix)
July 29, 2024	To Phoenix Suns (United States) E. J. Liddell	To Atlanta Hawks (United States) David Roddy
January 15, 2025	To Phoenix Suns (Jamaica) Nick Richards; 2025 second-round pick (from Denver via Charlotte) $3.25 Million traded player exception	To Charlotte Hornets (Nigeria) / (United States) Josh Okogie; 2026 second-round pick (from Denver via Phoenix); 2031 second-round pick (from Phoenix); 2031 second-round pick (from Denver via Phoenix)
January 21, 2025	To Phoenix Suns 2025 first-round pick (from Cleveland via Utah); 2027 first-round pick (from Cleveland, Minnesota, or Utah); 2029 first-round pick (from Cleveland, Minnesota, or Utah)	To Utah Jazz 2031 first-round pick
February 6, 2025	To Phoenix Suns (United States) Cody Martin (Serbia) Vasilije Micić; 2026 second-round pick (from Golden State via Charlotte)	To Charlotte Hornets (Bosnia and Herzegovina) Jusuf Nurkić; Phoenix's 2026 first-round pick rights to be swapped between Memphis, Orlando, and Washington

I: The 2025 second-round pick the Suns acquired from the Charlotte Hornets would become the lesser pick of second-round selections between the Denver Nuggets and Philadelphia 76ers due to a previous agreement the Hornets made requiring them to give up only the lesser selection of those two teams. However, on March 10, 2025, it was confirmed that the second-round pick that would be given to Phoenix in this case would belong to the Nuggets due to the combination of them having a winning record and the 76ers having a losing record by that date. That selection would later become Alex Toohey for the Suns before Toohey's draft rights were later traded to the Golden State Warriors in a different trade made in the following season after this one.
II: The 2025 first-round pick Phoenix acquired from the Utah Jazz would become the lesser available selection of first-round picks between the Cleveland Cavaliers and Minnesota Timberwolves due to previous trades the Jazz did in getting rid of previous star players of theirs with shooting guard Donovan Mitchell and center Rudy Gobert, respectively. However, on March 11, 2025, it was confirmed that the first-round pick the Suns would acquire would be the selection that belonged to Cleveland due to them securing a better overall record (to the point of having one of the best records of the season) when compared to the Timberwolves due to them getting a 16-game winning streak by this point in time. That selection would later become Liam McNeeley before his draft rights were later traded to the Charlotte Hornets in a different trade involving Vasilije Micić and Hornets center Mark Williams.
III: The 2027 first-round pick the Suns acquired from the Jazz would become the lesser available selection of first-round picks between the Cavaliers, Timberwolves, and Jazz themselves due to the aforementioned trades involving Donovan Mitchell and Rudy Gobert that Utah did in 2022.
IV: The 2029 first-round pick that Phoenix got from Utah would become the lesser available selection of first-round picks between Cleveland, Minnesota, and Utah themselves due to the previously mentioned trades involving Donovan Mitchell and Rudy Gobert that were done by the Jazz in 2022. However, Minnesota's first round pick is considered Top-5 protected, meaning if it somehow goes inside of the Top-5 during that year, its protections can go into another year for Utah instead, leaving it as a choice of the lesser pick between the Cavaliers and Jazz instead.
V: The 2026 second-round pick that would be going to Phoenix in this trade would either be the lesser selection previously held by the Denver Nuggets due to a previous trade the Suns made with Charlotte earlier in the year or by the Golden State Warriors through multiple trades on their end. It later was confirmed to be the Golden State Warriors that would be that selection being traded there after they finished that season in tenth place in the Western Conference.
VI: If the Washington Wizards' first-round pick in 2026 is in the Top 8 selections, they will have the option to swap their own selection with Phoenix if they somehow perform worse than them; the Orlando Magic will then have the option to swap their own pick with the Suns' pick instead in the event the Wizards' pick doesn't get conveyed into the New York Knicks' selection that year by falling outside of the Top 8 instead; the Memphis Grizzlies will then have the option to swap their own pick with Phoenix's new pick in the event either Washington or Orlando activate their pick swap choices. Finally, the Charlotte Hornets will receive whichever pick the Suns would have had after all pick swap rights are either exercised or declined. By the end of that season, the Suns' pick ended up becoming the 18th pick of the draft due to them having a tied record with the Orlando Magic that season, but the Magic would ultimately swap their first round pick rights (who were the original #18 pick in question) with the Suns turned Hornets (who had the #16 pick in the end), which led to Charlotte selecting Christian Anderson Jr. with their selection in that draft.

=== Free agency ===
==== Re-signed ====
Player	Signed	Date
Grayson Allen	Signed 4-year contract extension worth $70 Million	April 15, 2024
Damion Lee	Signed 1-year deal worth $2,800,834	July 3, 2024
Royce O'Neale	Signed 4-year contract extension worth $44 Million	July 6, 2024
Bol Bol	Signed 1-year deal worth $2,425,403 or $2,910,483	July 7, 2024
Josh Okogie	Signed 2-year deal worth $16 Million	July 13, 2024

==== Additions ====
Player	Signed	Former team(s)
Collin Gillespie	Signed two-way contract worth $578,577	Denver Nuggets / Grand Rapids Gold
Jalen Bridges	Signed two-way contract worth $578,577	Baylor Bears
Mason Plumlee	Signed 1-year deal worth $3,303,771	Los Angeles Clippers
Monté Morris	Signed 1-year deal worth $2,800,834	Minnesota Timberwolves
Tyus Jones	Signed 1-year deal worth $3,303,771	Washington Wizards
TyTy Washington Jr.	Signed two-way contract worth $578,577	Milwaukee Bucks / Wisconsin Herd

==== Subtractions ====
Player	Reason left	New team(s)
Ish Wainright	Unrestricted free agent	(Israel) Hapoel Tel Aviv B.C.
Eric Gordon	Unrestricted free agent	Philadelphia 76ers
David Roddy	Traded	Atlanta Hawks / Philadelphia 76ers / Delaware Blue Coats / Houston Rockets / Rio Grande Valley Vipers
Drew Eubanks	Unrestricted free agent	Utah Jazz / Los Angeles Clippers
Udoka Azubuike	Unrestricted free agent	(Montenegro) KK Budućnost Podgorica VOLI
Saben Lee	Unrestricted free agent	(Turkey) Manisa Basket / (Israel) Maccabi Playtika Tel Aviv B.C. / (Greece) Olympiacos Piraeus B.C.
E. J. Liddell	Waived	Chicago Bulls / Windy City Bulls
Nassir Little	Waived	Miami Heat / Sioux Falls Skyforce
Isaiah Thomas	Unrestricted free agent / Waived	Salt Lake City Stars
Thaddeus Young	Unrestricted free agent / Waived	
Josh Okogie	Traded	Charlotte Hornets
Jusuf Nurkić	Traded	Charlotte Hornets
