= Jaxson Hayes =

Slovenian-American basketball player (born 2000)

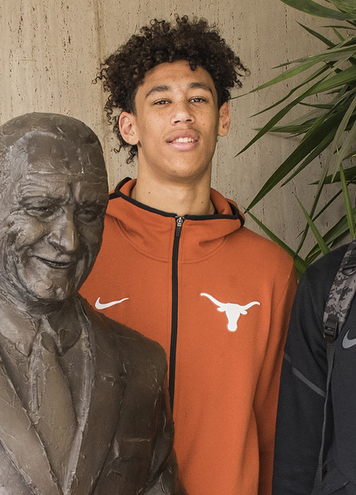
- Hayes with Texas in 2018

No. 11 – Utah Jazz
- Position: Center / power forward
- League: NBA

Personal information
- Born: May 23, 2000 (age 26) Norman, Oklahoma, U.S.
- Listed height: 7 ft 0 in (2.13 m)
- Listed weight: 220 lb (100 kg)

Career information
- High school: Moeller (Cincinnati, Ohio)
- College: Texas (2018–2019)
- NBA draft: 2019: 1st round, 8th overall pick
- Drafted by: Atlanta Hawks
- Playing career: 2019–present

Career history
- 2019–2023: New Orleans Pelicans
- 2021: →Birmingham Squadron
- 2023–2026: Los Angeles Lakers
- 2026–present: Utah Jazz

Career highlights
- NBA Cup champion (2023); NIT champion (2019); Second-team All-Big 12 (2019); Big 12 Freshman of the Year (2019); Big 12 All-Defensive Team (2019)
- Stats at NBA.com
- Stats at Basketball Reference

Jaxson Reed Hayes (born May 23, 2000) is a Slovenian-American professional basketball player for the Utah Jazz of the National Basketball Association (NBA). He played college basketball for the Texas Longhorns.

== High school career ==
Hayes attended Moeller High School in Cincinnati, Ohio. He grew from six feet (1.83 m) as a freshman to 6 ft 11 in (2.11 m) as a senior. In 2018 he took part in the Junior International Tournament (JIT), in Lissone, Italy, leading Team Ohio to the win of its fifth title. As a senior, he averaged 12 points, seven rebounds and four blocks per game. He committed to the University of Texas to play college basketball.

== College career ==
As a freshman at Texas, Hayes averaged 10.0 points and 5.0 rebounds per game while shooting 72.8% from the field. He scored a career-high 19 points along with seven boards, two steals and a block in a 69–56 loss to TCU. Hayes injured his left knee in a loss to Kansas in the Big 12 tournament. He was named Big 12 Freshman of the Year. On April 11, 2019, Hayes declared for the NBA draft, forfeiting his remaining three years of eligibility.

== Professional career ==
=== New Orleans Pelicans (2019–2023) ===
On June 20, 2019, the Atlanta Hawks selected Hayes with the eighth overall pick of the 2019 NBA draft and then had his draft rights traded, along with the draft rights to Nickeil Alexander-Walker and Didi Louzada, plus a heavily protected 2020 first-round pick, to the New Orleans Pelicans in exchange for the draft rights to De'Andre Hunter and Solomon Hill. The trade was officially completed on July 7.

Hayes made his NBA debut for the Pelicans on October 10, 2019, scoring 19 points on 8-of-11 shooting against the Golden State Warriors in an 11-point loss. On November 17, he made his first career start in place of the injured Derrick Favors, achieving his first double-double with 10 points and 10 rebounds along with 3 blocks in a 108–100 victory over the Golden State Warriors. On January 9, 2020, Hayes recorded his second NBA double-double, scoring 14 points and adding 12 rebounds to go along with 4 blocks in under 24 minutes of play. Days later, Hayes recorded 18 points and 10 rebounds in a victory over the New York Knicks, tallying consecutive double-doubles for the first time in his NBA career. The following night, Hayes posted a then-career-high 20 points in a 35-point loss to the Boston Celtics.

On May 7, 2021, Hayes scored a season-high 19 points in a 107–109 loss to the Philadelphia 76ers. On May 14, he matched this total in a 122–125 loss to the Golden State Warriors.

Hayes saw minimal playing time to start the 2021–22 season. On December 6, 2021, the Pelicans assigned him to their NBA G League affiliate, the Birmingham Squadron. He was recalled from the G League two days later. On January 1, 2022, Hayes registered a season-high 23 points, alongside seven rebounds, in a 113–136 loss to the Milwaukee Bucks. He again scored 23 points, alongside twelve rebounds, on April 5, 2022, during a 123–109 win over the Sacramento Kings that helped the Pelicans clinch a play-in tournament spot. During the second half of the season, Hayes moved into the starting lineup and averaged 10.7 points and 5.7 rebounds per game over the last 23 games of the season. The Pelicans qualified for their first playoff appearance since 2018 after play-in wins over the San Antonio Spurs and Los Angeles Clippers.

The Pelicans faced the Phoenix Suns during the first round of the playoffs. On April 22, 2022, during a 111–114 game 3 loss, Hayes was ejected after receiving a flagrant 2 foul for pushing Suns forward Jae Crowder. Hayes finished the game with four points and six rebounds in only ten minutes of action. The Pelicans wound up losing the series in six games.

=== Los Angeles Lakers (2023–2026) ===
On July 6, 2023, Hayes signed with the Los Angeles Lakers. He made 70 appearances for the team during the 2023–24 NBA season, averaging 4.3 points, 3.0 rebounds and 0.5 assist.

Hayes started 35 games in the 2025 NBA season for the Lakers following the Anthony Davis trade to the Dallas Mavericks. In 56 total appearances for the team during the 2024–25 NBA season, he averaged 6.8 points, 4.8 rebounds and 1.0 assist.

On July 3, 2025, Hayes re-signed with Los Angeles on a one-year contract. Appearing in 66 games (including nine starts) for the Lakers during the 2025–26 NBA season, Hayes recorded averages of 7.5 points and 4.1 rebounds.

=== Utah Jazz (2026–present) ===
On July 10, 2026, Hayes signed a two-year, $12 million contract with the Utah Jazz, with the second season being a team option. On October 21, he made his Jazz debut, recording five points, five rebounds, three assists, two steals, and six blocks in a 123–103 loss to the Memphis Grizzlies.

== Career statistics ==
Legend
GP	Games played	GS	Games started	MPG	Minutes per game
FG%	Field goal percentage	3P%	3-point field goal percentage	FT%	Free throw percentage
RPG	Rebounds per game	APG	Assists per game	SPG	Steals per game
BPG	Blocks per game	PPG	Points per game	**Bold**	Career high

=== NBA ===
==== Regular season ====
Year	Team	GP	GS	MPG	FG%	3P%	FT%	RPG	APG	SPG	BPG	PPG
2019–20	New Orleans	64	14	16.9	.672	.250	.647	4.0	.9	.4	**.9**	7.4
2020–21	New Orleans	60	3	16.1	.625	.429	**.775**	4.3	.6	.4	.6	7.5
2021–22	New Orleans	**70**	28	**20.0**	.616	.351	.766	4.5	.6	**.5**	.8	**9.3**
2022–23	New Orleans	47	2	13.0	.551	.103	.699	2.8	.7	.4	.4	5.0
2023–24	L.A. Lakers	**70**	5	12.5	.720	.000	.622	3.0	.5	**.5**	.4	4.3
2024–25	L.A. Lakers	56	**35**	19.5	.722	.000	.622	**4.8**	**1.0**	**.5**	**.9**	6.8
2025–26	L.A. Lakers	66	9	18.3	**.756**	**1.000**	.653	4.1	.9	.4	.8	7.5
Career		433	96	16.7	.665	.280	.689	4.0	.7	.5	.7	6.9

==== Playoffs ====
Year	Team	GP	GS	MPG	FG%	3P%	FT%	RPG	APG	SPG	BPG	PPG
2022	New Orleans	6	**6**	13.8	.560	.000	.636	2.5	.2	.0	.3	**5.8**
2024	L.A. Lakers	4	0	6.0	.000	—	.500	3.0	.3	.0	.0	.3
2025	L.A. Lakers	4	4	7.8	.375	—	.500	2.0	.3	.0	.3	1.8
2026	L.A. Lakers	**10**	0	**16.3**	**.679**	.000	**.704**	**3.2**	**.7**	**.3**	**.8**	5.7
Career		24	10	12.5	.571	.000	.667	2.8	.4	.1	.5	4.2

=== College ===
Year	Team	GP	GS	MPG	FG%	3P%	FT%	RPG	APG	SPG	BPG	PPG
2018–19	Texas	32	21	23.3	.728	–	.740	5.0	.3	.6	2.2	10.0

== Personal life ==
Hayes father, Jonathan Hayes, played in the National Football League (NFL) and was the head coach of the XFL's St. Louis BattleHawks. His mother, Kristi (Kinne), played basketball at Drake University (1991–95) and earned honorable mention Kodak All-American accolades and Missouri Valley Conference Player of the Year honors as a senior (1994–95). She recorded 3,406 career points during her four years (1987–91) at Jefferson-Scranton High School in Jefferson, Iowa. She previously served as an assistant women's basketball coach at Oklahoma, Iowa and Southern Illinois–Carbondale. Hayes has three siblings: Jillian, who is in her fifth year as a starting forward at the University of Cincinnati; Jewett, a defensive end at the University of Virginia; and Jonah.

=== Domestic violence incident ===
Hayes was arrested on July 28, 2021, and resisted arrest by the Los Angeles Police Department. Officers were investigating a radio call that involved a domestic dispute between Hayes and his girlfriend. Hayes shoved an officer into a wall and was treated for minor injuries before being taken into custody. Hayes pleaded no contest to misdemeanor charges of false imprisonment and resisting an officer, and was sentenced to community service, one year of weekly domestic violence classes, and three years' probation. Hayes was not disciplined by the NBA, in apparent violation of league policy.

In November 2024, TMZ published surveillance video of Hayes pushing his girlfriend, spitting at her, preventing her from exiting the house, and pulling her back through a doorway. On the video, his girlfriend can be heard saying, "I'm not going to let you hit me anymore. What the fuck do I look like, a punching bag?" After the video was released, the NBA reopened its investigation into Hayes' conduct.

=== International ===
In October 2025, Hayes announced he was pursuing a passport to play for Slovenia, the home country of now-former teammate Luka Dončić. Dončić and Hayes share the same agent, who also represented Anthony Randolph, a member of the Slovenian team that won EuroBasket 2017. The Slovenian national team allows for one naturalized citizen and Hayes cited the lack of open tryouts for the U.S. team as a reason.
