= Olivier-Maxence Prosper =

Canadian basketball player (born 2002)

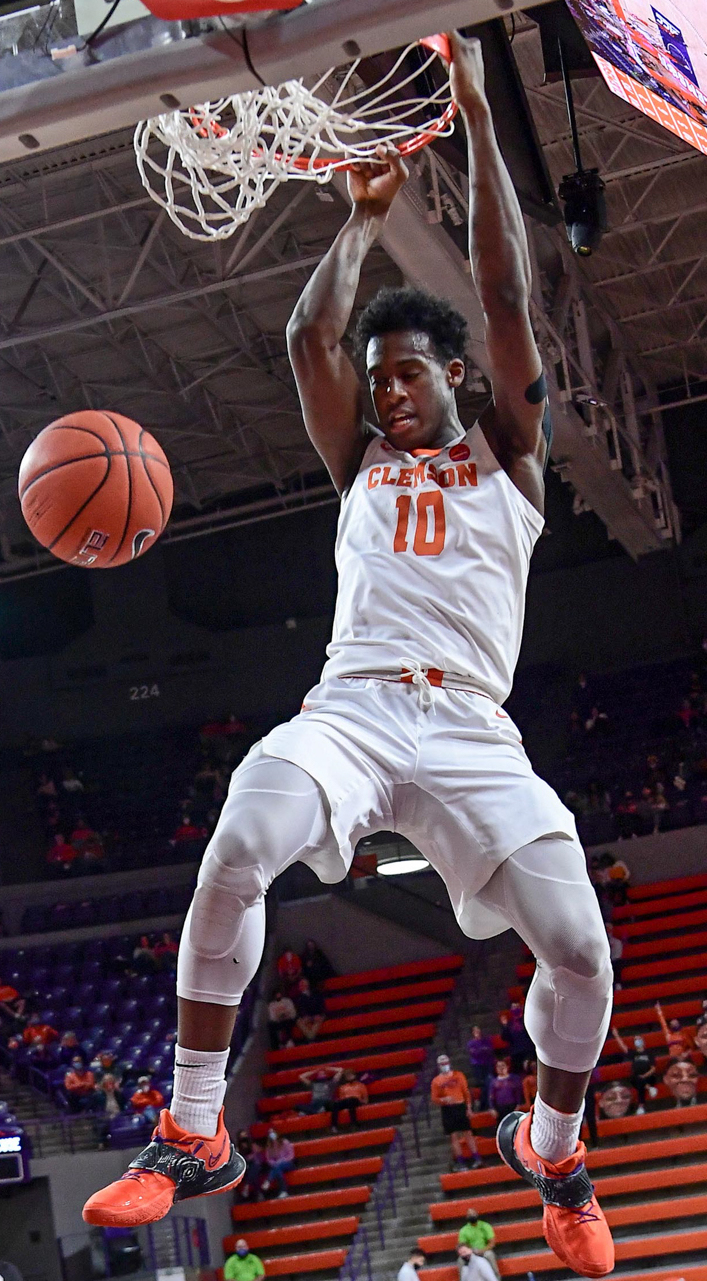
- Prosper with Clemson in 2021

No. 18 – Memphis Grizzlies
- Position: Small forward / power forward
- League: NBA

Personal information
- Born: July 3, 2002 (age 24) Montreal, Quebec, Canada
- Listed height: 6 ft 7 in (2.01 m)
- Listed weight: 230 lb (104 kg)

Career information
- High school: Lake Forest Academy (Lake Forest, Illinois); NBA Academy Latin America (Mexico City, Mexico)
- College: Clemson (2020–2021); Marquette (2021–2023)
- NBA draft: 2023: 1st round, 24th overall pick
- Drafted by: Sacramento Kings
- Playing career: 2023–present

Career history
- 2023–2025: Dallas Mavericks
- 2023–2024: →Texas Legends
- 2025–present: Memphis Grizzlies
- 2025–2026: →Memphis Hustle
- Stats at NBA.com
- Stats at Basketball Reference
Medals
Men's basketball
Representing Canada
FIBA Under-19 World Cup
Bronze medal – third place	2021 Latvia	Team

Olivier-Maxence Prosper (/əˈlɪvieɪ ˈmæksəns ˈprɒspər/ ə-LIV-ee-ay MAK-sənss PROSS-pər; born July 3, 2002), nicknamed "OMax", is a Canadian professional basketball player for the Memphis Grizzlies of the National Basketball Association (NBA). He played college basketball for the Clemson Tigers and Marquette Golden Eagles.

== Early life and high school ==
Prosper grew up in Montreal, Quebec, Canada. Prosper's father Gaetan moved to Montreal from Haiti as a child. He initially attended L'Académie Ste-Thérèse, which did not have a basketball team. When Prosper was 16 he enrolled at Lake Forest Academy in Lake Forest, Illinois. Prosper transferred to the NBA Academy Latin America in Mexico City, Mexico to finish his high school career. He was rated a four-star recruit and committed to play college basketball at Clemson.

== College career ==
Prosper began his college career at Clemson. He averaged ten minutes of play and 2.5 points per game as a freshman. After the season, Prosper entered the NCAA transfer portal.

Prosper ultimately transferred to Marquette. He averaged 6.6 points and 3.3 rebounds in his first season with the Golden Eagles. Prosper averaged 12.5 points, 4.7 rebounds, and 0.9 steals per game as a junior. After the season, he entered the 2023 NBA draft, showcasing impressive performances at the NBA Draft Combine.

== Professional career ==
Prosper was drafted 24th overall by the Sacramento Kings in the 2023 NBA draft. Shortly after, his draft rights were traded, along with Richaun Holmes, to the Dallas Mavericks in exchange for cash considerations and on July 16, 2023, he signed with the Mavericks. On November 11, Prosper was assigned to the Mavericks’ G League affiliate, the Texas Legends.

On April 14, 2024, in the Mavericks' season finale against the Detroit Pistons, Prosper earned his first career start, logging 16 points, 6 rebounds, and 2 steals in 29 minutes. Later in the season, the Mavericks, along with Prosper, reached the 2024 NBA Finals; they subsequently lost to the Boston Celtics in five games.

Prosper made 52 appearances (four starts) for Dallas during the 2024–25 NBA season, averaging 3.9 points, 2.4 rebounds, and 0.8 assists. On March 7, 2025, it was announced that Prosper would require season-ending surgery to repair ligament damage in his right wrist. On September 2, Prosper was waived by the Mavericks.

On September 4, 2025, Prosper signed a two-way contract with the Memphis Grizzlies. On February 7, 2026, Prosper scored a career-high 25 points in addition to five rebounds in a loss to the Portland Trail Blazers. On March 4, the Grizzlies signed Prosper to a standard, two-year NBA contract.

== Career statistics ==
Legend
GP	Games played	GS	Games started	MPG	Minutes per game
FG%	Field goal percentage	3P%	3-point field goal percentage	FT%	Free throw percentage
RPG	Rebounds per game	APG	Assists per game	SPG	Steals per game
BPG	Blocks per game	PPG	Points per game	**Bold**	Career high

=== NBA ===
==== Regular season ====
Year	Team	GP	GS	MPG	FG%	3P%	FT%	RPG	APG	SPG	BPG	PPG
2023–24	Dallas	40	1	8.4	.385	.289	.683	2.0	.6	.2	.1	3.0
2024–25	Dallas	52	4	11.2	.402	.235	.645	2.4	.8	.5	.1	3.9
2025–26	Memphis	**53**	**24**	**18.6**	**.549**	**.405**	**.754**	**3.5**	**1.0**	**.8**	**.2**	**10.0**
Career		145	29	13.1	.481	.348	.706	2.7	.8	.5	.2	5.9

==== Playoffs ====
Year	Team	GP	GS	MPG	FG%	3P%	FT%	RPG	APG	SPG	BPG	PPG
2024	Dallas	3	0	3.0	.000	—	—	1.0	.3	.0	.0	.0
Career		3	0	3.0	.000	—	—	1.0	.3	.0	.0	.0

=== College ===
Year	Team	GP	GS	MPG	FG%	3P%	FT%	RPG	APG	SPG	BPG	PPG
2020–21	Clemson	22	2	9.7	.346	.167	.682	1.9	0.3	0.2	0.1	2.5
2021–22	Marquette	32	25	20.7	.461	.317	.820	3.3	0.9	0.9	0.1	6.6
2022–23	Marquette	36	36	29.1	.512	.339	.735	4.7	0.7	0.9	0.1	12.5
Career		90	63	21.4	.478	.316	.749	3.5	0.7	0.7	0.1	8.0

== Personal life ==
Prosper's parents both played college basketball at Concordia University and were both multiple-time RSEQ All-Stars, his mother Guylaine competed for the Canada women's national basketball team. His sister, Cassandre, plays basketball for the Washington Mystics.
