= 2023–24 Dallas Mavericks season =

2023–24 NBA season by team

- Conference champions
- Division champions
- Head coach: Jason Kidd
- President: Nico Harrison
- General manager: Nico Harrison
- Owner(s): Miriam Adelson and Patrick Dumont (majority); Mark Cuban (minority)
- Arena: American Airlines Center

Results
- Record: 50–32 (.610)
- Place: Division: 1st (Southwest); Conference: 5th (Western)
- Playoff finish: NBA Finals (lost to Celtics 1–4)
- Stats at Basketball Reference

Local media
- Television: Bally Sports Southwest; Tegna Inc. (Note: Affiliates all within the state of Texas include: WFAA (Dallas/Fort Worth); KCEN-TV (Killeen/Temple/Waco); KYTX (Jacksonville/Longview/Lufkin/Nacogdoches/Tyler); KWES-TV (Midland/Odessa); KIDY (San Angelo); KXVA (Abilene)) (10 games)
- Radio: KEGL

The 2023–24 Dallas Mavericks season was the 44th season for the franchise in the National Basketball Association (NBA). This was also the final season in which Mark Cuban was the sole owner of the Mavericks; during the season, Cuban transitioned to a minority ownership stake, and Miriam Adelson and Patrick Dumont became majority owners of the franchise.

At the February 8 trade deadline, the Mavericks were eighth in the Western Conference with a 28–23 record when they acquired center Daniel Gafford from the Washington Wizards and forward P. J. Washington from the Charlotte Hornets. The team went 22–9 after the deadline and finished fifth in the West. The Mavericks improved upon their 38–44 record from the 2022–2023 season, qualified for the playoffs, and won the Southwest Division title.

The Mavericks defeated the Los Angeles Clippers and the top-seeded Oklahoma City Thunder each in six games to advance to their second Western Conference Finals appearance in three seasons. In the Conference Finals, the team defeated the Minnesota Timberwolves in five games to advance to the 2024 NBA Finals. The Mavericks' NBA Finals appearance was the third in the franchise's history and the team's first in 13 years since winning its lone NBA title in 2011. In the Finals, the Boston Celtics defeated the Mavericks in five games.

The Dallas Mavericks drew an average home attendance of 20,217 in 41 home games in the 2023–24 NBA season, the 2nd highest in the league.

== Draft ==
Round	Pick	Player	Position(s)	Nationality	College / Club
1	10	Cason Wallace	G / F	USA	Kentucky

The Mavericks entered this draft with a first-round pick. The New York Knicks held about 20.2% chance of acquiring the first-round pick; however, Dallas retained it after falling within the top ten in the lottery. Dallas had also traded their second-round pick to the Oklahoma City Thunder in 2020, which was eventually used by the Denver Nuggets in the draft, satisfying a condition that awarded Denver the second-best selection among Oklahoma City, the Washington Wizards, and the better of the Miami Heat or Dallas picks after Dallas finished the previous season worse than Miami and between Washington and Oklahoma City.

The Mavericks used their only selection to select Cason Wallace but later traded his draft rights to Oklahoma City for the draft rights to Dereck Lively II, the 12th overall pick.

== Roster ==
2023–24 Dallas Mavericks roster
Players

Pos.	No.	Player	Height	Weight	DOB	From
F	13	Greg III Brown (TW)	6 ft 7 in (2.01 m)	206 lb (93 kg)	2001-09-01	Texas
G/F	77	Luka Dončić	6 ft 7 in (2.01 m)	230 lb (104 kg)	1999-02-28	Slovenia
G	0	Dante Exum	6 ft 5 in (1.96 m)	214 lb (97 kg)	1995-07-13	Australia
F	3	Alex Fudge (TW)	6 ft 8 in (2.03 m)	200 lb (91 kg)	2003-06-05	Florida
F/C	21	Daniel Gafford	6 ft 10 in (2.08 m)	234 lb (106 kg)	1998-10-01	Arkansas
G/F	8	Josh Green	6 ft 5 in (1.96 m)	200 lb (91 kg)	2000-11-16	Arizona
G/F	10	Tim Jr. Hardaway	6 ft 5 in (1.96 m)	205 lb (93 kg)	1992-03-16	Michigan
G	1	Jaden Hardy	6 ft 3 in (1.91 m)	198 lb (90 kg)	2002-07-05	Coronado HS (NV)
G	11	Kyrie Irving	6 ft 2 in (1.88 m)	195 lb (88 kg)	1992-03-23	Duke
F	55	Derrick Jr. Jones	6 ft 6 in (1.98 m)	210 lb (95 kg)	1997-02-15	UNLV
F	42	Maxi Kleber	6 ft 10 in (2.08 m)	240 lb (109 kg)	1992-01-29	Germany
G	9	A. J. Lawson	6 ft 6 in (1.98 m)	179 lb (81 kg)	2000-07-15	South Carolina
C	2	Dereck II Lively	7 ft 1 in (2.16 m)	230 lb (104 kg)	2004-02-12	Duke
F	88	Markieff Morris	6 ft 9 in (2.06 m)	245 lb (111 kg)	1989-09-02	Kansas
F/C	7	Dwight Powell	6 ft 10 in (2.08 m)	240 lb (109 kg)	1991-07-20	Stanford
F	18	Olivier-Maxence Prosper	6 ft 7 in (2.01 m)	230 lb (104 kg)	2002-07-03	Marquette
F	25	P. J. Washington	6 ft 7 in (2.01 m)	230 lb (104 kg)	1998-08-23	Kentucky
G	00	Brandon Williams (TW)	6 ft 1 in (1.85 m)	190 lb (86 kg)	1999-11-22	Arizona

Coaches
Head coach
- Jason Kidd
Assistant(s)
- Darrell Armstrong
- Josh Broghamer
- Jared Dudley
- Eric Hughes
- Alex Jensen
- Marko Milič
- God Shammgod
- Sean Sweeney
- Keith Veney

Legend
- (DP) Unsigned draft pick
- (FA) Free agent
- (S) Suspended
- (GL) On assignment to G League affiliate
- (TW) Two-way affiliate player
- Injured

Roster
Updated: March 31, 2024

== Standings ==
=== Division ===
Southwest Division	W	L	PCT	GB	Home	Road	Div	GP
y – Dallas Mavericks	50	32	.610	–	25‍–‍16	25‍–‍16	11‍–‍5	82
x – New Orleans Pelicans	49	33	.598	1.0	21‍–‍19	28‍–‍14	9‍–‍7	82
Houston Rockets	41	41	.500	9.0	27‍–‍14	14‍–‍27	9‍–‍7	82
Memphis Grizzlies	27	55	.329	23.0	9‍–‍32	18‍–‍23	8‍–‍8	82
San Antonio Spurs	22	60	.268	28.0	12‍–‍29	10‍–‍31	3‍–‍13	82

=== Conference ===
Western Conference
#	Team	W	L	PCT	GB	GP
1	c – Oklahoma City Thunder *	57	25	.695	–	82
2	x – Denver Nuggets	57	25	.695	–	82
3	x – Minnesota Timberwolves	56	26	.683	1.0	82
4	y – Los Angeles Clippers *	51	31	.622	6.0	82
5	y – Dallas Mavericks *	50	32	.610	7.0	82
6	x – Phoenix Suns	49	33	.598	8.0	82
7	x – New Orleans Pelicans	49	33	.598	8.0	82
8	x – Los Angeles Lakers	47	35	.573	10.0	82
9	pi – Sacramento Kings	46	36	.561	11.0	82
10	pi – Golden State Warriors	46	36	.561	11.0	82
11	Houston Rockets	41	41	.500	16.0	82
12	Utah Jazz	31	51	.378	26.0	82
13	Memphis Grizzlies	27	55	.329	30.0	82
14	San Antonio Spurs	22	60	.268	35.0	82
15	Portland Trail Blazers	21	61	.256	36.0	82

== Game log ==
=== Preseason ===
The Mavericks faced the Minnesota Timberwolves twice in Abu Dhabi, United Arab Emirates. The remainder of the schedule was announced on August 30, 2023.

2023 preseason game log
Total: 1–3 (Home: 1–1; Road: 0–2)
Preseason: 1–3 (home: 1–1; road: 0–2)

Game	Date	Team	Score	High points	High rebounds	High assists	Location Attendance	Record
1	October 5	@ Minnesota	L 99–111	Luka Dončić (25)	A. J. Lawson (8)	four players (3)	(United Arab Emirates) Etihad Arena	0–1
2	October 7	Minnesota	L 96–104	Jaden Hardy (22)	Jaden Hardy (8)	Luka Dončić (6)	(United Arab Emirates) Etihad Arena; 12,009	0–2
3	October 10	@ Real Madrid	L 123–127	Tim Hardaway Jr. (21)	Grant Williams (9)	Dante Exum (9)	(Spain) WiZink Center; 12,763	0–3
4	October 20	Detroit	W 114–104	Josh Green (22)	Kyrie Irving (8)	Kyrie Irving (11)	American Airlines Center; 19,282	1–3

2023–24 preseason schedule

=== Regular season ===
The schedule was announced on August 18, 2023.

2023–24 game log
Total: 50–32 (Home: 25–16; Road: 25–16)
October: 3–0 (home: 1–0; road: 2–0)

Game	Date	Team	Score	High points	High rebounds	High assists	Location Attendance	Record
1	October 25	@ San Antonio	W 126–119	Luka Dončić (33)	Luka Dončić (13)	Luka Dončić (10)	Frost Bank Center; 18,947	1–0
2	October 27	Brooklyn	W 125–120	Luka Dončić (49)	Luka Dončić (10)	Luka Dončić (7)	American Airlines Center; 20,238	2–0
3	October 30	@ Memphis	W 125–110	Luka Dončić (35)	Luka Dončić (12)	Luka Dončić (12)	FedExForum; 15,031	3–0

November: 8–6 (home: 4–2; road: 4–4)

Game	Date	Team	Score	High points	High rebounds	High assists	Location Attendance	Record
4	November 1	Chicago	W 114–105	Grant Williams (25)	Dereck Lively II (13)	Luka Dončić (10)	American Airlines Center; 20,103	4–0
5	November 3	@ Denver	L 114–125	Luka Dončić (34)	Luka Dončić (10)	Luka Dončić (8)	Ball Arena; 19,729	4–1
6	November 5	Charlotte	W 124–118	Luka Dončić (23)	Dereck Lively II (14)	Kyrie Irving (10)	American Airlines Center; 20,052	5–1
7	November 6	@ Orlando	W 117–102	Luka Dončić (29)	Hardaway Jr., Irving (6)	Kyrie Irving (10)	Amway Center; 19,409	6–1
8	November 8	Toronto	L 116–127	Luka Dončić (31)	Luka Dončić (7)	Luka Dončić (8)	American Airlines Center; 20,063	6–2
9	November 10	L.A. Clippers	W 144–126	Luka Dončić (44)	Derrick Jones Jr. (10)	Dončić, Exum (6)	American Airlines Center; 20,377	7–2
10	November 12	@ New Orleans	W 136–124	Kyrie Irving (35)	Dwight Powell (10)	Luka Dončić (9)	Smoothie King Center; 16,302	8–2
11	November 14	@ New Orleans	L 110–131	Hardaway Jr., Irving (17)	Dereck Lively II (9)	Kyrie Irving (6)	Smoothie King Center; 16,354	8–3
12	November 15	@ Washington	W 130–117	Tim Hardaway Jr. (31)	Dereck Lively II (9)	Luka Dončić (10)	Capital One Arena; 16,632	9–3
13	November 18	@ Milwaukee	L 125–132	Kyrie Irving (39)	Dereck Lively II (10)	Luka Dončić (9)	Fiserv Forum; 18,128	9–4
14	November 19	Sacramento	L 113–129	Luka Dončić (25)	Luka Dončić (10)	Luka Dončić (7)	American Airlines Center; 20,211	9–5
15	November 22	@ L.A. Lakers	W 104–101	Luka Dončić (30)	Luka Dončić (12)	Luka Dončić (8)	Crypto.com Arena; 18,997	10–5
16	November 25	@ L.A. Clippers	L 88–107	Luka Dončić (30)	Dante Exum (8)	Luka Dončić (4)	Crypto.com Arena; 19,370	10–6
17	November 28	Houston	W 121–115	Luka Dončić (41)	Luka Dončić (9)	Luka Dončić (9)	American Airlines Center; 20,103	11–6

December: 8–8 (home: 3–5; road: 5–3)

Game	Date	Team	Score	High points	High rebounds	High assists	Location Attendance	Record
18	December 1	Memphis	L 94–108	Jones Jr., G. Williams (16)	Grant Williams (8)	three players (5)	American Airlines Center; 20,150	11–7
19	December 2	Oklahoma City	L 120–126	Luka Dončić (36)	Dereck Lively II (16)	Luka Dončić (18)	American Airlines Center; 20,277	11–8
20	December 6	Utah	W 147–97	Luka Dončić (40)	Luka Dončić (10)	Luka Dončić (11)	American Airlines Center; 19,877	12–8
21	December 8	@ Portland	W 125–112	Luka Dončić (32)	Dereck Lively II (9)	Luka Dončić (10)	Moda Center; 18,762	13–8
22	December 11	@ Memphis	W 120–113	Luka Dončić (35)	Dereck Lively II (16)	Dončić, Exum (6)	FedExForum; 16,379	14–8
23	December 12	L.A. Lakers	W 127–125	Luka Dončić (33)	Dereck Lively II (8)	Luka Dončić (17)	American Airlines Center; 20,377	15–8
24	December 14	Minnesota	L 101–119	Luka Dončić (39)	Dončić, Lively II (6)	Luka Dončić (13)	American Airlines Center; 20,177	15–9
25	December 16	@ Portland	W 131–120	Luka Dončić (40)	Luka Dončić (12)	Luka Dončić (10)	Moda Center; 18,439	16–9
26	December 18	@ Denver	L 104–130	Luka Dončić (38)	Luka Dončić (11)	Luka Dončić (8)	Ball Arena; 19,659	16–10
27	December 20	L.A. Clippers	L 111–120	Luka Dončić (28)	Dončić, G. Williams (9)	Luka Dončić (10)	American Airlines Center; 20,310	16–11
28	December 22	@ Houston	L 96–122	Olivier-Maxence Prosper (20)	Richaun Holmes (8)	Dennis, Hardy (4)	Toyota Center; 18,055	16–12
29	December 23	San Antonio	W 144–119	Luka Dončić (39)	Luka Dončic (12)	Luka Dončić (10)	American Airlines Center; 20,409	17–12
30	December 25	@ Phoenix	W 128–114	Luka Dončić (50)	Dereck Lively II (10)	Luka Dončić (15)	Footprint Center; 17,071	18–12
31	December 27	Cleveland	L 110–113	Luka Dončić (39)	Luka Dončić (7)	Dončić, Exum (6)	American Airlines Center; 18,024	18–13
32	December 28	@ Minnesota	L 110–118	Tim Hardaway Jr. (32)	Dwight Powell (14)	Dante Exum (6)	Target Center; 20,377	18–14
33	December 30	@ Golden State	W 132–122	Luka Dončić (39)	Dereck Lively II (14)	Luka Dončić (10)	Chase Center; 18,064	19–14

January: 7–8 (home: 6–5; road: 1–3)

Game	Date	Team	Score	High points	High rebounds	High assists	Location Attendance	Record
34	January 1	@ Utah	L 90–127	Luka Dončić (19)	Kyrie Irving (9)	Luka Dončić (14)	Delta Center; 18,206	19–15
35	January 3	Portland	W 126–97	Luka Dončić (41)	Kyrie Irving (9)	Irving, Dončić (5)	American Airlines Center; 20,077	20–15
36	January 5	Portland	W 139–103	Kyrie Irving (24)	three players (9)	Jaden Hardy (9)	American Airlines Center; 20,162	21–15
37	January 7	Minnesota	W 115–108	Kyrie Irving (35)	Derrick Jones Jr. (10)	Luka Dončić (8)	American Airlines Center; 20,111	22–15
38	January 9	Memphis	L 103–120	Kyrie Irving (33)	Kyrie Irving (8)	Luka Dončić (8)	American Airlines Center; 20,116	22–16
39	January 11	New York	W 128–124	Kyrie Irving (44)	Dwight Powell (9)	Kyrie Irving (10)	American Airlines Center; 20,040	23–16
40	January 13	New Orleans	L 108–118	Kyrie Irving (33)	Dwight Powell (9)	Dwight Powell (8)	American Airlines Center; 20,155	23–17
41	January 15	New Orleans	W 125–120	Kyrie Irving (42)	Dereck Lively II (12)	Irving, G. Williams (7)	American Airlines Center; 20,010	24–17
42	January 17	@ L.A. Lakers	L 110–127	Luka Dončić (33)	Luka Dončić (13)	Luka Dončić (10)	Crypto.com Arena; 18,338	24–18
–	January 19	@ Golden State	Postponed due to the death of Warriors assistant coach Dejan Milojević; (Makeup date: April 2) (Note: The game originally scheduled for January 19, was postponed due to the death of Warriors assistant coach Dejan Milojević.)					
43	January 22	Boston	L 110–119	Luka Dončić (33)	Luka Dončić (18)	Luka Dončić (13)	American Airlines Center; 20,277	24–19
44	January 24	Phoenix	L 109–132	Luka Dončić (34)	Luka Dončić (8)	Luka Dončić (9)	American Airlines Center; 20,202	24–20
45	January 26	@ Atlanta	W 148–143	Luka Dončić (73)	Dereck Lively II (11)	Luka Dončić (7)	State Farm Arena; 16,149	25–20
46	January 27	Sacramento	L 115–120	Luka Dončić (28)	Luka Dončić (10)	Luka Dončić (17)	American Airlines Center; 20,373	25–21
47	January 29	Orlando	W 131–129	Luka Dončić (45)	Dereck Lively II (11)	Luka Dončić (15)	American Airlines Center; 20,020	26–21
48	January 31	@ Minnesota	L 87–121	Josh Green (18)	Richaun Holmes (10)	Curry, Holmes, Powell (3)	Target Center; 18,024	26–22

February: 8–3 (home: 4–1; road: 4–2)

Game	Date	Team	Score	High points	High rebounds	High assists	Location Attendance	Record
49	February 3	Milwaukee	L 117–129	Luka Dončić (40)	Dončić, Green (9)	Luka Dončić (11)	American Airlines Center; 20,377	26–23
50	February 5	@ Philadelphia	W 118–102	Kyrie Irving (23)	Luka Dončić (8)	Kyrie Irving (8)	Wells Fargo Center; 19,176	27–23
51	February 6	@ Brooklyn	W 119–107	Kyrie Irving (36)	Luka Dončić (18)	Luka Dončić (9)	Barclays Center; 17,732	28–23
52	February 8	@ New York	W 122–108	Luka Dončić (39)	Luka Dončić (8)	Luka Dončić (11)	Madison Square Garden; 19,812	29–23
53	February 10	Oklahoma City	W 146–111	Luka Dončić (32)	Maxi Kleber (12)	Luka Dončić (9)	American Airlines Center; 20,277	30–23
54	February 12	Washington	W 112–104	Dončić, Irving (26)	Daniel Gafford (17)	Luka Dončić (15)	American Airlines Center; 19,921	31–23
55	February 14	San Antonio	W 116–93	Kyrie Irving (34)	Daniel Gafford (10)	Luka Dončić (8)	American Airlines Center; 20,311	32–23
All-Star Game
56	February 22	Phoenix	W 123–113	Luka Dončić (41)	Luka Dončić (9)	Luka Dončić (11)	American Airlines Center; 20,377	33–23
57	February 25	@ Indiana	L 111–133	Luka Dončić (33)	three players (6)	Luka Dončić (6)	Gainbridge Fieldhouse; 17,274	33–24
58	February 27	@ Cleveland	L 119–121	Luka Dončić (45)	Luka Dončić (9)	Luka Dončić (14)	Rocket Mortgage FieldHouse; 19,432	33–25
59	February 28	@ Toronto	W 136–125	Luka Dončić (30)	Luka Dončić (11)	Luka Dončić (16)	Scotiabank Arena; 19,800	34–25

March: 11–4 (home: 4–2; road: 7–2)

Game	Date	Team	Score	High points	High rebounds	High assists	Location Attendance	Record
60	March 1	@ Boston	L 110–138	Luka Dončić (37)	Luka Dončić (12)	Luka Dončić (11)	TD Garden; 19,156	34–26
61	March 3	Philadelphia	L 116–120	Luka Dončić (38)	Luka Dončić (11)	Luka Dončić (10)	American Airlines Center; 20,277	34–27
62	March 5	Indiana	L 120–137	Luka Dončić (39)	Dončić, Gafford (10)	Luka Dončić (11)	American Airlines Center; 20,200	34–28
63	March 7	Miami	W 114–108	Luka Dončić (35)	Luka Dončić (11)	Luka Dončić (11)	American Airlines Center; 20,221	35–28
64	March 9	@ Detroit	W 142–124	Luka Dončić (39)	Luka Dončić (10)	Luka Dončić (10)	Little Caesars Arena; 20,062	36–28
65	March 11	@ Chicago	W 127–92	Luka Dončić (27)	Luka Dončić (12)	Luka Dončić (14)	United Center; 21,363	37–28
66	March 13	Golden State	W 109–99	Kyrie Irving (23)	Irving, Lively II (8)	Kyrie Irving (10)	American Airlines Center; 20,411	38–28
67	March 14	@ Oklahoma City	L 119–126	Kyrie Irving (36)	Daniel Gafford (15)	Kyrie Irving (12)	Paycom Center; 18,203	38–29
68	March 17	Denver	W 107–105	Luka Dončić (37)	P. J. Washington (11)	Kyrie Irving (9)	American Airlines Center; 20,377	39–29
69	March 19	@ San Antonio	W 113–107	Kyrie Irving (28)	Luka Dončić (10)	Luka Dončić (16)	Frost Bank Center; 18,354	40–29
70	March 21	Utah	W 113–97	Luka Dončić (34)	Luka Dončić (9)	Luka Dončić (8)	American Airlines Center; 20,277	41–29
71	March 25	@ Utah	W 115–105	Luka Dončić (29)	Luka Dončić (12)	Luka Dončić (13)	Delta Center; 18,206	42–29
72	March 26	@ Sacramento	W 132–96	Luka Dončić (28)	P. J. Washington (13)	Kyrie Irving (8)	Golden 1 Center; 17,832	43–29
73	March 29	@ Sacramento	W 107–103	Kyrie Irving (30)	Dončić, Lively II (9)	Luka Dončić (12)	Golden 1 Center; 17,832	44–29
74	March 31	@ Houston	W 125–107	Luka Dončić (47)	Luka Dončić (12)	Dončić, Irving (7)	Toyota Center; 18,055	45–29

April: 5–3 (home: 3–1; road: 2–2)

Game	Date	Team	Score	High points	High rebounds	High assists	Location Attendance	Record
75	April 2	@ Golden State	L 100–104	Luka Dončić (30)	Luka Dončić (12)	Luka Dončić (11)	Chase Center; 18,064	45–30
76	April 4	Atlanta	W 109–95	Kyrie Irving (26)	Luka Dončić (12)	Luka Dončić (8)	American Airlines Center; 20,211	46–30
77	April 5	Golden State	W 108–106	P. J. Washington (32)	Daniel Gafford (15)	Exum, Irving (7)	American Airlines Center; 20,425	47–30
78	April 7	Houston	W 147–136 (OT)	Kyrie Irving (48)	P. J. Washington (13)	Luka Dončić (12)	American Airlines Center; 20,317	48–30
79	April 9	@ Charlotte	W 130–104	Luka Dončić (39)	Luka Dončić (12)	Luka Dončić (10)	Spectrum Center; 17,425	49–30
80	April 10	@ Miami	W 111–92	Luka Dončić (29)	Luka Dončić (9)	Luka Dončić (9)	Kaseya Center; 19,660	50–30
81	April 12	Detroit	L 89–107	Jaden Hardy (25)	Dwight Powell (10)	Dwight Powell (4)	American Airlines Center; 20,274	50–31
82	April 14	@ Oklahoma City	L 86–135	Brandon Williams (22)	Powell, Prosper (8)	five players (3)	Paycom Center; 18,203	50–32

2023–24 season schedule

=== Postseason ===
2024 playoff game log
Total: 13–9 (home: 6–4; road: 7–5)
First Round: 4–2 (home: 2–1; road: 2–1)

Game	Date	Team	Score	High points	High rebounds	High assists	Location Attendance	Series
1	April 21	@ L.A. Clippers	L 97–109	Luka Dončić (33)	Luka Dončić (13)	Luka Dončić (6)	Crypto.com Arena; 19,370	0–1
2	April 23	@ L.A. Clippers	W 96–93	Luka Dončić (32)	Dereck Lively II (9)	Luka Dončić (9)	Crypto.com Arena; 19,370	1–1
3	April 26	L.A. Clippers	W 101–90	Luka Dončić (22)	Luka Dončić (10)	Luka Dončić (9)	American Airlines Center; 20,402	2–1
4	April 28	L.A. Clippers	L 111–116	Kyrie Irving (40)	Luka Dončić (10)	Luka Dončić (10)	American Airlines Center; 20,411	2–2
5	May 1	@ L.A. Clippers	W 123–93	Luka Dončić (35)	Dončić, Lively II (7)	Luka Dončić (10)	Crypto.com Arena; 19,370	3–2
6	May 3	L.A. Clippers	W 114–101	Kyrie Irving (30)	Dereck Lively II (9)	Luka Dončić (13)	American Airlines Center; 20,625	4–2

Conference Semifinals: 4–2 (home: 2–1; road: 2–1)

Game	Date	Team	Score	High points	High rebounds	High assists	Location Attendance	Series
1	May 7	@ Oklahoma City	L 95–117	Kyrie Irving (20)	Daniel Gafford (11)	Luka Dončić (9)	Paycom Center; 18,203	0–1
2	May 9	@ Oklahoma City	W 119–110	Dončić, Washington (29)	P. J. Washington (11)	Kyrie Irving (11)	Paycom Center; 18,203	1–1
3	May 11	Oklahoma City	W 105–101	P. J. Washington (27)	Luka Dončić (15)	Kyrie Irving (7)	American Airlines Center; 20,325	2–1
4	May 13	Oklahoma City	L 96–100	P. J. Washington (21)	Dončić, Washington (12)	Luka Dončić (10)	American Airlines Center; 20,607	2–2
5	May 15	@ Oklahoma City	W 104–92	Luka Dončić (31)	three players (10)	Luka Dončić (11)	Paycom Center; 18,203	3–2
6	May 18	Oklahoma City	W 117–116	Luka Dončić (29)	Dereck Lively II (15)	Luka Dončić (10)	American Airlines Center; 20,555	4–2

Conference Finals: 4–1 (home: 1–1; road: 3–0)

Game	Date	Team	Score	High points	High rebounds	High assists	Location Attendance	Series
1	May 22	@ Minnesota	W 108–105	Luka Dončić (33)	Dereck Lively II (11)	Luka Dončić (8)	Target Center; 19,433	1–0
2	May 24	@ Minnesota	W 109–108	Luka Dončić (32)	Luka Dončić (10)	Luka Dončić (13)	Target Center; 19,636	2–0
3	May 26	Minnesota	W 116–107	Dončić, Irving (33)	P. J. Washington (8)	Luka Dončić (5)	American Airlines Center; 20,511	3–0
4	May 28	Minnesota	L 100–105	Luka Dončić (28)	Luka Dončić (15)	Luka Dončić (10)	American Airlines Center; 20,477	3–1
5	May 30	@ Minnesota	W 124–103	Dončić, Irving (36)	Luka Dončić (10)	Dončić, Irving (5)	Target Center; 19,333	4–1

NBA Finals: 1–4 (home: 1–1; road: 0–3)

Game	Date	Team	Score	High points	High rebounds	High assists	Location Attendance	Series
1	June 6	@ Boston	L 89–107	Luka Dončić (30)	Luka Dončić (10)	Kyrie Irving (2)	TD Garden; 19,156	0–1
2	June 9	@ Boston	L 98–105	Luka Dončić (32)	Luka Dončić (11)	Luka Dončić (11)	TD Garden; 19,156	0–2
3	June 12	Boston	L 99–106	Kyrie Irving (35)	Dereck Lively II (13)	Luka Dončić (6)	American Airlines Center; 20,311	0–3
4	June 14	Boston	W 122–84	Luka Dončić (29)	Dereck Lively II (12)	Kyrie Irving (6)	American Airlines Center; 20,277	1–3
5	June 17	@ Boston	L 88–106	Luka Dončić (28)	Luka Dončić (12)	Kyrie Irving (9)	TD Garden; 19,156	1–4

2024 playoff schedule

=== In-Season Tournament ===
This was the first regular season where all the NBA teams competed in a mid-season tournament setting due to the implementation of the 2023 NBA In-Season Tournament. During the in-season tournament period, the Mavericks competed in Group B of the Western Conference, which included the defending champion Denver Nuggets, the Los Angeles Clippers, the New Orleans Pelicans, and the Houston Rockets.

==== West group B ====
Pos	Team	Pld	W	L	PF	PA	PD	Qualification	NOP	HOU	DAL	DEN	LAC
1	New Orleans Pelicans	4	3	1	463	430	+33	Advance to knockout stage	—	101–104	131–110	115–110	116–106
2	Houston Rockets	4	2 (Note: Tied on head-to-head results. Overall point difference is used as the tiebreaker.)	2	424	414	+10		104–101	—	115–121	105–86	100–106
3	Dallas Mavericks	4	2	2	489	497	−8		110–131	121–115	—	114–125	144–126
4	Denver Nuggets	4	2	2	432	442	−10		110–115	86–105	125–114	—	111–108
5	Los Angeles Clippers	4	1	3	446	471	−25		106–116	106–100	126–144	108–111	—

Source: NBA
Rules for classification: Tiebreakers
Notes:

2023–24 game log
Total: 2–2 (Home: 2–0; Road: 0–2)
In-Season Tournament: 2–2 (home: 2–0; road: 0–2)

Game	Date	Team	Score	High points	High rebounds	High assists	Location Attendance	Record
1	November 3	@ Denver	L 114–125	Luka Dončić (34)	Luka Dončić (10)	Luka Dončić (8)	Ball Arena; 19,729	0–1
2	November 10	L.A. Clippers	W 144–126	Luka Dončić (44)	Derrick Jones Jr. (10)	Dončić, Exum (6)	American Airlines Center; 20,377	1–1
3	November 14	@ New Orleans	L 110–131	Hardaway Jr., Irving (17)	Dereck Lively II (9)	Kyrie Irving (6)	Smoothie King Center; 16,354	1–2
4	November 28	Houston	W 121–115	Luka Dončić (41)	Luka Dončić (9)	Luka Dončić (9)	American Airlines Center; 20,103	2–2

== Player statistics ==
=== Regular season ===
Player	POS	GP	GS	MP	REB	AST	STL	BLK	PTS	MPG	RPG	APG	SPG	BPG	PPG
Tim Hardaway Jr.	SF	79	12	2,120	254	139	42	6	1,139	26.8	3.2	1.8	.5	.1	14.4
Derrick Jones Jr.	SF	76	66	1,783	250	75	53	51	657	23.5	3.3	1.0	.7	.7	8.6
Jaden Hardy	SG	73	7	989	131	109	22	4	530	13.5	1.8	1.5	.3	.1	7.3
Luka Dončić	PG	70	70	2,624	647	686	99	38	2,370	37.5	9.2	9.8	1.4	.5	33.9
Dwight Powell	C	63	9	836	214	84	26	20	208	13.3	3.4	1.3	.4	.3	3.3
Kyrie Irving	SG	58	58	2,030	290	299	74	28	1,487	35.0	5.0	5.2	1.3	.5	25.6
Josh Green	SG	57	33	1,505	184	130	47	9	469	26.4	3.2	2.3	.8	.2	8.2
Dereck Lively II	C	55	42	1,294	378	60	36	77	483	23.5	6.9	1.1	.7	1.4	8.8
Danté Exum	PG	55	17	1,088	149	157	22	5	428	19.8	2.7	2.9	.4	.1	7.8
Grant Williams^{†}	PF	47	33	1,242	169	81	24	27	382	26.4	3.6	1.7	.5	.6	8.1
Maxi Kleber	C	43	7	871	143	68	17	30	191	20.3	3.3	1.6	.4	.7	4.4
A. J. Lawson	SG	42	0	311	50	20	10	3	136	7.4	1.2	.5	.2	.1	3.2
Olivier-Maxence Prosper	PF	40	1	336	79	22	7	4	121	8.4	2.0	.6	.2	.1	3.0
Seth Curry^{†}	SG	36	3	457	52	30	17	3	154	12.7	1.4	.8	.5	.1	4.3
P. J. Washington^{†}	PF	29	28	935	179	44	34	27	339	32.2	6.2	1.5	1.2	.9	11.7
Daniel Gafford^{†}	PF	29	21	623	201	46	21	56	324	21.5	6.9	1.6	.7	1.9	11.2
Markieff Morris	PF	26	1	216	39	16	5	3	66	8.3	1.5	.6	.2	.1	2.5
Richaun Holmes^{†}	C	23	2	237	78	15	3	9	78	10.3	3.4	.7	.1	.4	3.4
Brandon Williams	PG	17	0	113	13	17	1	1	54	6.6	.8	1.0	.1	.1	3.2
Greg Brown III	PF	6	0	40	9	4	0	4	15	6.7	1.5	.7	.0	.7	2.5
Dexter Dennis	SG	4	0	30	9	4	0	1	22	7.5	2.3	1.0	.0	.3	5.5
Alex Fudge^{†}	SF	2	0	26	3	0	3	0	11	13.0	1.5	.0	1.5	.0	5.5

- ^{†} Denotes player spent time with another team in the season. Stats reflect time with the Mavericks only.

=== Playoffs ===
Player	POS	GP	GS	MP	REB	AST	STL	BLK	PTS	MPG	RPG	APG	SPG	BPG	PPG
Luka Dončić	PG	22	22	900	208	178	41	8	635	40.9	9.5	8.1	1.9	.4	28.9
Kyrie Irving	SG	22	22	879	81	113	23	7	487	40.0	3.7	5.1	1.0	.3	22.1
P. J. Washington	PF	22	22	785	145	31	16	17	286	35.7	6.6	1.4	.7	.8	13.0
Derrick Jones Jr.	SF	22	22	647	76	27	11	21	200	29.4	3.5	1.2	.5	1.0	9.1
Daniel Gafford	PF	22	22	445	122	15	6	33	197	20.2	5.5	.7	.3	1.5	9.0
Josh Green	SG	22	0	399	56	23	17	3	109	18.1	2.5	1.0	.8	.1	5.0
Dereck Lively II	C	21	0	462	156	27	9	20	165	22.0	7.4	1.3	.4	1.0	7.9
Danté Exum	PG	21	0	144	17	12	3	1	43	6.9	.8	.6	.1	.0	2.0
Jaden Hardy	SG	19	0	129	15	17	3	0	80	6.8	.8	.9	.2	.0	4.2
Tim Hardaway Jr.	SF	14	0	178	25	5	5	1	61	12.7	1.8	.4	.4	.1	4.4
Maxi Kleber	C	13	0	219	25	13	3	4	48	16.8	1.9	1.0	.2	.3	3.7
Dwight Powell	C	13	0	44	12	3	1	0	6	3.4	.9	.2	.1	.0	.5
A. J. Lawson	SG	10	0	30	3	0	0	1	11	3.0	.3	.0	.0	.1	1.1
Olivier-Maxence Prosper	PF	3	0	9	3	1	0	0	0	3.0	1.0	.3	.0	.0	.0
Markieff Morris	PF	1	0	12	4	0	0	0	3	12.0	4.0	.0	.0	.0	3.0

== Transactions ==
=== Trades ===
Date	Incoming	Outgoing
June 22, 2023	To Dallas Mavericks Draft rights to Dereck Lively II	To Oklahoma City Thunder Dāvis Bertāns; Draft rights to Cason Wallace
July 6, 2023	To Dallas Mavericks Draft rights to Olivier-Maxence Prosper Richaun Holmes	To Sacramento Kings Cash considerations
July 12, 2023	To Dallas Mavericks Grant Williams 2025 second-round pick 2028 second-round pick	To San Antonio Spurs Reggie Bullock 2030 first-round pick swap
July 12, 2023	To Boston Celtics 2024 second-round pick 2025 second-round pick swap 2030 second-round pick	
February 8, 2024	To Dallas Mavericks P.J. Washington	To Charlotte Hornets Grant Williams Seth Curry 2027 first-round pick
February 8, 2024	To Dallas Mavericks Daniel Gafford	To Washington Wizards Richaun Holmes 2024 first-round pick swap

=== Re-signed ===
Player	Signed
Kyrie Irving	July 7
Dwight Powell	July 9
Markieff Morris	September 16

=== Contract extensions ===
Player	Signed
Josh Green	October 23

=== Additions ===
Player	Signed	Former team
Dante Exum	July 14	(Serbia) KK Partizan
Seth Curry	July 14	Brooklyn Nets
Mike Miles Jr.	July 14	TCU
Greg Brown III	August 14	Ontario Clippers
Jordan Walker	August 14	UAB Blazers
Joe Wieskamp	August 14	Toronto Raptors
Derrick Jones Jr.	August 18	Chicago Bulls
Dexter Dennis	September 22	Texas A&M
Tazé Moore	October 16	Texas Legends
Tony Bradley	October 20	Chicago Bulls
Brandon Williams	December 28	Osceola Magic
Alex Fudge	March 4	South Bay Lakers

=== Subtractions ===
Player	Date	New team
Justin Holiday	July 6	Denver Nuggets
McKinley Wright IV	July 22	(Montenegro) Budućnost
Frank Ntilikina	August 5	Charlotte Hornets
JaVale McGee	August 29	Sacramento Kings
Christian Wood	September 6	Los Angeles Lakers
Mike Miles Jr.	October 14	Texas Legends
Jordan Walker	October 14	Texas Legends
Joe Wieskamp	October 14	Texas Legends
Tony Bradley	October 20	Texas Legends
Dexter Dennis	December 28	Texas Legends

== Awards ==
Player	Award	Date awarded
Luka Dončić	Western Conference Player of the Week	December 11–17, February 5–11
Luka Dončić	Western Conference Player of the Month	February, March/April
Luka Dončić	All-Star	January 25
Luka Dončić	All-NBA First Team	May 22
Luka Dončić	Western Conference Finals MVP	May 30
Kyrie Irving	Western Conference Player of the Week	April 1–7
Dereck Lively II	All-Rookie Second Team	May 20
