= Richaun Holmes =

American basketball player (born 1993)

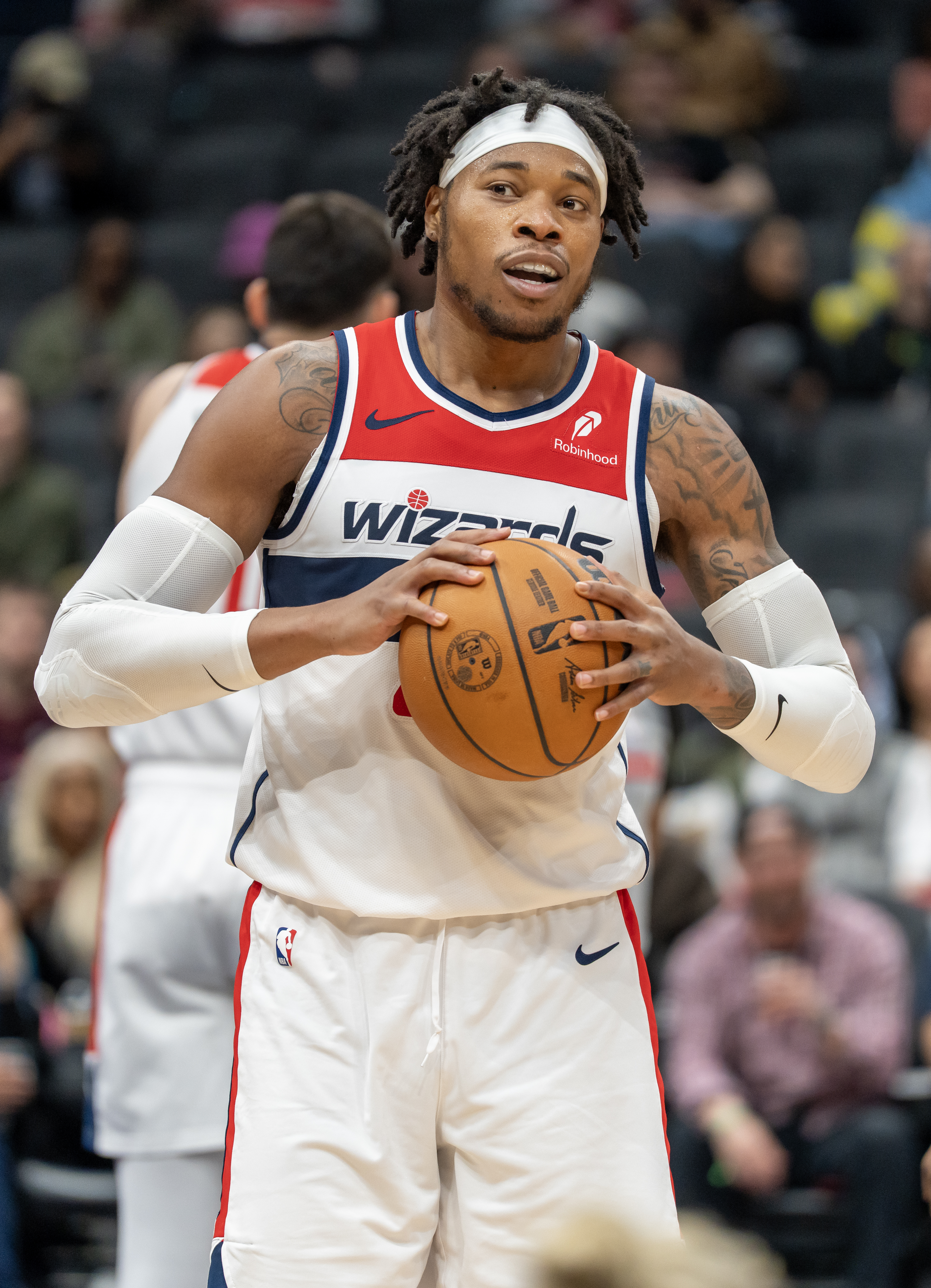
- Holmes with the Washington Wizards in 2025

Free agent
- Position: Center / power forward

Personal information
- Born: October 15, 1993 (age 33) Lockport, Illinois, U.S.
- Listed height: 6 ft 9 in (2.06 m)
- Listed weight: 234 lb (106 kg)

Career information
- High school: Lockport Township (Lockport, Illinois)
- College: Moraine Valley CC (2011–2012); Bowling Green (2012–2015)
- NBA draft: 2015: 2nd round, 37th overall pick
- Drafted by: Philadelphia 76ers
- Playing career: 2015–present

Career history
- 2015–2018: Philadelphia 76ers
- 2017: →Delaware 87ers
- 2018–2019: Phoenix Suns
- 2019–2023: Sacramento Kings
- 2023–2024: Dallas Mavericks
- 2024–2025: Washington Wizards
- 2025–2026: Panathinaikos

Career highlights
- Greek Cup winner (2026); First-team All-MAC (2015); Third-team All-MAC (2014); MAC Defensive Player of the Year (2015)
- Stats at NBA.com
- Stats at Basketball Reference

Richaun Diante Holmes (/rɪˈʃɔːn/ rih-SHAWN; born October 15, 1993) is an American professional basketball player who last played for Panathinaikos of the Greek Basketball League (GBL) and the EuroLeague. He played college basketball for the Bowling Green Falcons where he was named to multiple All-Mid-American Conference teams. Holmes has previously played in the National Basketball Association (NBA) for the Philadelphia 76ers, Phoenix Suns, Sacramento Kings, Dallas Mavericks, and Washington Wizards.

== High school and college career ==
Holmes is the son of two Doctors of Divinity who run a Chicago-area church. In high school, Holmes grew from a 6' 2" guard into a 6' 9" forward, but did not receive any Division I college basketball scholarship offers until he had already committed to playing for Moraine Valley Community College, located in Illinois.

In his only season at Moraine Valley, Holmes averaged 19.3 points, 9.3 rebounds and 5.2 blocks per game. After earning junior college All-American honors, Holmes transferred to Bowling Green.

In his sophomore season at Bowling Green, Holmes averaged 6.5 points, 5.0 rebounds and 2.3 blocks per game. He doubled his scoring numbers while contributing 7.7 rebounds and 2.5 blocks per game as a junior. With the hiring of coach Chris Jans, Holmes worked on improving every aspect of his game and adding a three-point shot, sometimes taking 1,000 shots a day in practice. The result was averages of 14.7 points, 8.0 rebounds and 2.7 blocks per game as a senior and shooting percentages of 56.3% on field goals and 41.9% on three-pointers. In Holmes' senior year, Bowling Green improved to 21–12 from a 12-win season the year prior, while also reaching the CollegeInsider.com Tournament.

== Professional career ==
=== Philadelphia 76ers (2015–2018) ===
On June 25, 2015, Holmes was selected with the 37th overall pick in the 2015 NBA draft by the Philadelphia 76ers. On July 31, he signed with the 76ers after averaging 10 points and five rebounds in three summer league games for the team. On November 9, Holmes received his first career start, scoring a then-season-high 11 points in a loss to the Chicago Bulls. He topped that mark on December 10, with 14 points against the San Antonio Spurs. On December 28, Holmes set a new career–high with 18 points in a 95–91 loss to the Utah Jazz. Holmes made 51 appearances for Philadelphia during his rookie campaign, averaging 5.6 points and 2.6 rebounds.

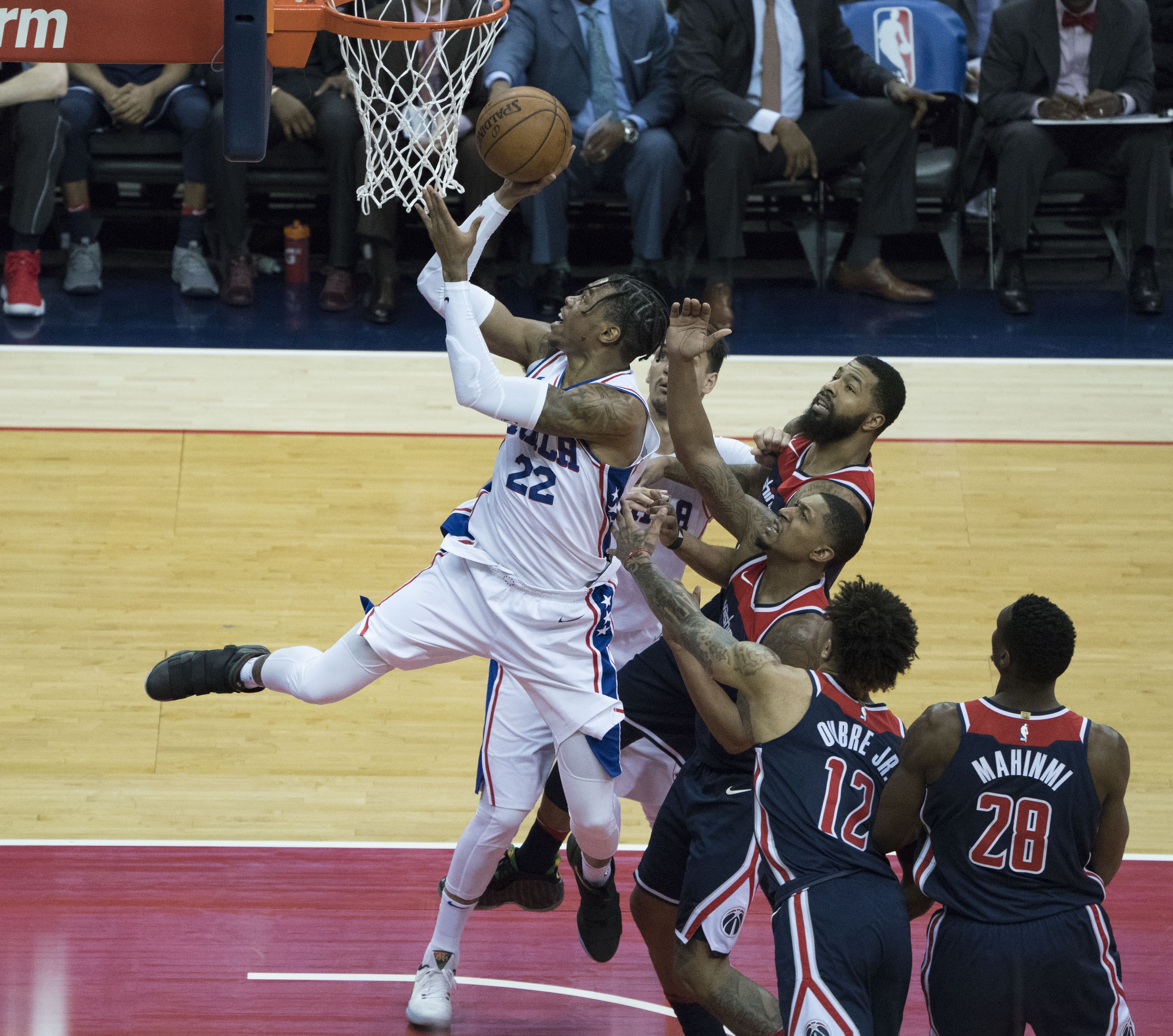
Holmes scoring in 2018

In July 2016, Holmes re-joined the 76ers for the 2016 NBA Summer League. In January 2017, he was assigned three times to the Delaware 87ers of the NBA Development League. He became a fixture in the Sixers' rotation in February 2017 following the Nerlens Noel trade, the prolonged injury to Joel Embiid, and Holmes outplaying fellow 2015 Sixers pick Jahlil Okafor. On February 24, 2017, Holmes had 12 points, 10 rebounds, and five blocks to help the depleted 76ers defeat the Washington Wizards 120–112. On March 20, he tied a career high in points with 24 and established a career best in rebounds with 14 in a 112–109 overtime loss to the Orlando Magic. Nine days later, Holmes set a new career–high with 25 points in a 99–92 loss to the Atlanta Hawks. He made 57 appearances (including 17 starts) for the 76ers during the 2016–17 NBA season, averaging 9.8 points and 5.5 rebounds.

On October 8, 2017, Holmes was ruled out for approximately three weeks after being diagnosed with a non-displaced fracture in the radial bone of his left wrist. He made 48 appearances (including three starts) for Philadelphia during the 2017–18 season, recording averages of 6.5 points, 4.4 rebounds, and 1.3 assists. On June 13, 2018, the 76ers announced they had exercised the fourth-year option on their contract with Holmes.

=== Phoenix Suns (2018–2019) ===
On July 20, 2018, Holmes was traded to the Phoenix Suns in exchange for cash considerations. On November 6, he had season highs of 13 points and 10 rebounds in a 104–82 loss to the Brooklyn Nets. Holmes later recorded a new season high of 19 points in a 123–119 overtime loss to the Los Angeles Clippers on December 10. Holmes recorded a double-double of 12 points and a new season–high of 11 rebounds on March 15, 2019, during 16 minutes of play in a 108–102 loss to the Houston Rockets. Holmes made 70 appearances (including four starts) for Phoenix during the 2018–19 NBA season, averaging 8.2 points and 4.7 rebounds.

=== Sacramento Kings (2019–2023) ===
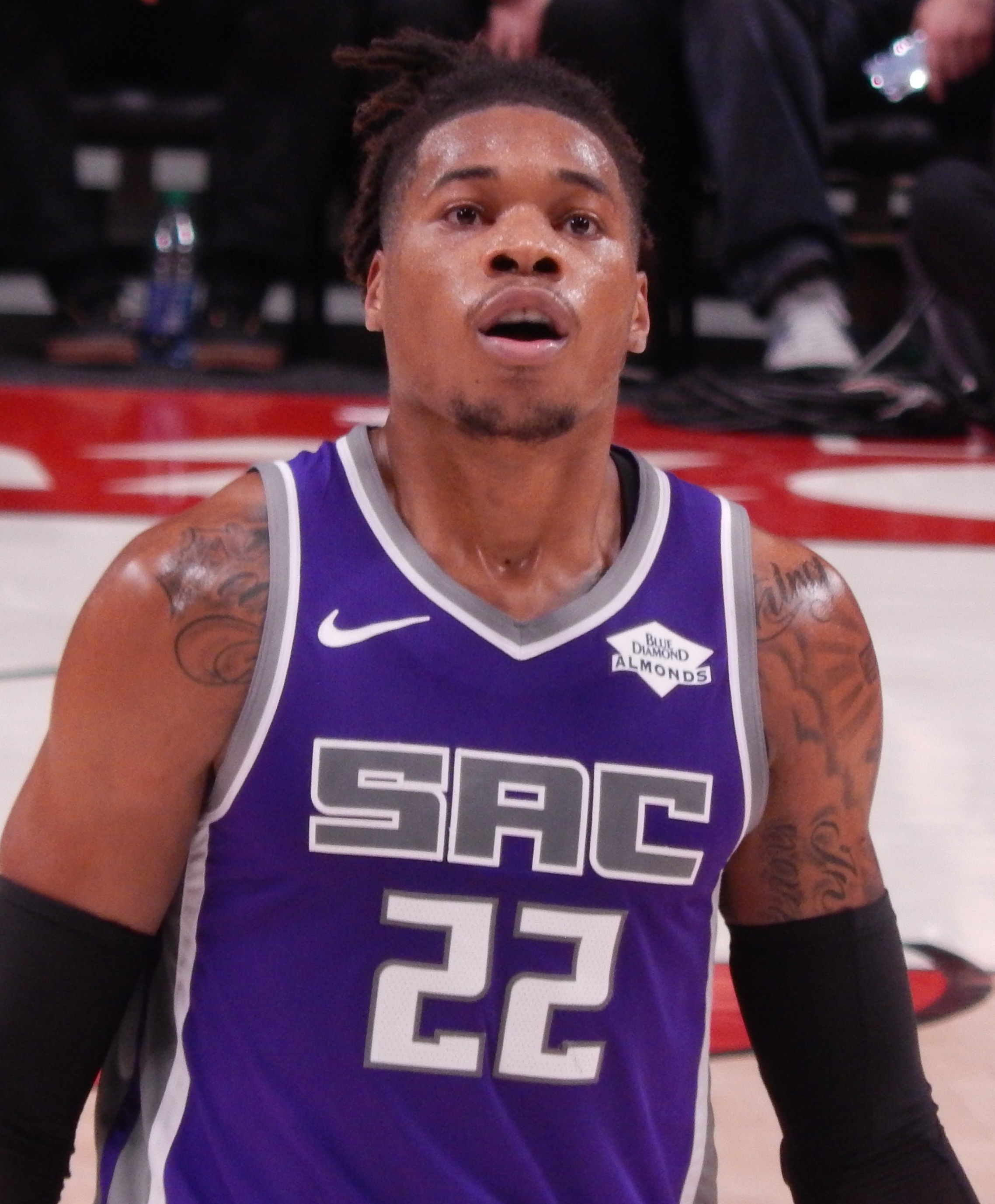
Holmes with Sacramento in 2019

On July 16, 2019, Holmes signed a two-year contract, worth $10 million, with the Sacramento Kings. He made 44 appearances (38 starts) for Sacramento during the 2019–20 NBA season, recording averages of 12.3 points, 8.1 rebounds, and 1.0 assists. Holmes started all 61 of his appearances for the Kings during the 2020–21 season, posting career–highs in points (14.2), rebounds (8.3), and assists (1.7).

On August 6, 2021, Holmes re-signed with the Kings on a four-year, $55 million contract. He made 45 appearances (including 37 starts) for Sacramento in the 2021–22 campaign, averaging 10.4 points, 7.0 rebounds, and 1.1 assists. On March 18, 2022, Holmes was ruled out for the remainder of the season due to personal issues.

Holmes made 41 appearances (including one start) for Sacramento during the 2022–23 season, recording averages of 3.1 points and 1.9 rebounds.

=== Dallas Mavericks (2023–2024) ===
On July 6, 2023, Holmes, along with the draft rights to Olivier-Maxence Prosper, was traded from the Sacramento Kings to the Dallas Mavericks. Holmes made 23 appearances (including two starts) for the Mavericks during the 2023–24 NBA season, logging averages of 3.4 points and 3.4 rebounds.

=== Washington Wizards (2024–2025) ===
On February 8, 2024, Holmes and a future first-round pick were traded to the Washington Wizards in exchange for Daniel Gafford. He made 17 appearances (eight starts) down the stretch for Washington, averaging 7.1 points and 6.1 rebounds.

On June 29, 2024, Holmes agreed to an extension with the Wizards. He made 31 appearances (including seven starts) for Washington during the 2024–25 NBA season, posting averages of 7.4 points, 5.7 rebounds, and 1.4 assists. On July 14, 2025, Holmes was waived by the Wizards.

=== Panathinaikos (2025–2026) ===
On August 9, 2025, Holmes signed with Panathinaikos of the Greek Basketball League (GBL) and the EuroLeague after Panathinaikos failed to secure Lithuanian centre Jonas Valančiūnas, who ultimately remained in the NBA. His contract was a two‑year deal with a 1+1 structure, allowing the club and player to evaluate the partnership after the first season. Holmes was reported to be one of the highest‑paid players in Europe, earning approximately €2.7 million for the first year.

Holmes made his debut for the club in a friendly tournament Final (the annual Pavlos Giannakopoulos Tournament) vs the Adelaide 36ers, registering 14 points and 10 rebounds as Panathinaikos won 106–89. In his fourth EuroLeague game of the 2025‑26 season, he produced perhaps his best performance for the club: 24 points and 10 rebounds in a 91–85 win over ASVEL Basket, shooting 11 of 12 from the field and grabbing seven offensive rebounds.

After only a handful of games, on October 29, 2025 Holmes was forced off in a EuroLeague home win over Maccabi Tel Aviv B.C. with a knee injury, later diagnosed as a partial tear of the medial collateral ligament (MCL) in his right knee which was expected to sideline him for approximately one month. On March 24, 2026, the team announced the termination of Holmes' contract. He had recently gotten into a public argument with the head coach, Ergin Ataman following a game on March 15 where the coach publicly called Holmes out for his lack of effort.

== Personal life ==
On March 24, 2022, Holmes' ex–wife accused him of domestic violence and abusing his six–year–old son.

== Career statistics ==
Legend
GP	Games played	GS	Games started	MPG	Minutes per game
FG%	Field goal percentage	3P%	3-point field goal percentage	FT%	Free throw percentage
RPG	Rebounds per game	APG	Assists per game	SPG	Steals per game
BPG	Blocks per game	PPG	Points per game	**Bold**	Career high

=== NBA ===
==== Regular season ====
Year	Team	GP	GS	MPG	FG%	3P%	FT%	RPG	APG	SPG	BPG	PPG
2015–16	Philadelphia	51	1	13.8	.514	.182	.689	2.6	.6	.4	.8	5.6
2016–17	Philadelphia	57	17	20.9	.558	.351	.699	5.5	1.0	.7	1.0	9.8
2017–18	Philadelphia	48	2	15.5	.560	.129	.661	4.4	1.3	.4	.6	6.5
2018–19	Phoenix	**70**	4	16.9	.608	—	.731	4.7	.9	.6	1.1	8.2
2019–20	Sacramento	44	38	28.2	.648	—	.788	8.1	1.0	**.9**	1.3	12.3
2020–21	Sacramento	61	**61**	**29.2**	.637	.182	.794	**8.3**	**1.7**	.6	**1.6**	**14.2**
2021–22	Sacramento	45	37	23.9	**.660**	.400	.778	7.0	1.1	.4	.9	10.4
2022–23	Sacramento	42	1	8.3	.618	**.625**	.789	1.9	.2	.1	.3	3.1
2023–24	Dallas	23	2	10.3	.559	—	.571	3.4	.7	.1	.4	3.4
2023–24	Washington	17	8	18.7	.557	.333	**.846**	6.1	.6	.5	.6	7.1
2024–25	Washington	31	7	17.2	.647	.000	.833	5.7	1.4	.3	.7	7.4
Career		489	178	19.1	.605	.269	.751	5.3	1.0	.5	.9	8.5

==== Playoffs ====
Year	Team	GP	GS	MPG	FG%	3P%	FT%	RPG	APG	SPG	BPG	PPG
2018	Philadelphia	3	0	3.7	.000	—	—	.3	.3	.0	.0	.0
Career		3	0	3.7	.000	—	—	.3	.3	.0	.0	.0

=== College ===
Year	Team	GP	GS	MPG	FG%	3P%	FT%	RPG	APG	SPG	BPG	PPG
2012–13	Bowling Green	**32**	2	18.8	**.633**	.000	.620	5.0	.2	.5	2.3	6.5
2013–14	Bowling Green	**32**	**31**	**32.0**	.507	.300	.706	7.7	**.9**	**1.1**	**2.8**	13.3
2014–15	Bowling Green	31	30	28.8	.563	**.419**	**.712**	**8.0**	.8	.7	2.7	**14.7**
Career		95	63	26.5	.554	.353	.697	6.9	.7	.8	2.6	11.5

=== EuroLeague ===
Year	Team	GP	GS	MPG	FG%	3P%	FT%	RPG	APG	SPG	BPG	PPG	PIR
2025–26	Panathinaikos	19	11	18:44	.644	.000	.860	4.3	.4	.3	.5	7.9	9.1

== Player profile ==
Listed at 6 feet 9 inches (2.06 m) and 235 pounds (107 kg), Holmes has primarily played the center and power forward positions throughout his career.

Coming out of Bowling Green, Holmes was known for being a rim protector and having quick feet. Holmes has developed a push shot that has become an efficient tool in his offensive game.
