= Alex Fudge =

American basketball player (born 2003)

Rio Grande Valley Vipers
- Position: Small forward / power forward
- League: NBA G League

Personal information
- Born: May 6, 2003 (age 23) Jacksonville, Florida, U.S.
- Listed height: 6 ft 9 in (2.06 m)
- Listed weight: 190 lb (86 kg)

Career information
- High school: Riverside (Jacksonville, Florida)
- College: LSU (2021–2022); Florida (2022–2023)
- NBA draft: 2023: undrafted
- Playing career: 2023–present

Career history
- 2023–2024: Los Angeles Lakers
- 2023–2024: →South Bay Lakers
- 2024: South Bay Lakers
- 2024: Dallas Mavericks
- 2024: →Texas Legends
- 2024–2025: South Bay Lakers
- 2025–2026: Sioux Falls Skyforce
- 2026: Ottawa BlackJacks
- 2026–present: Rio Grande Valley Vipers

Career highlights
- NBA Cup champion (2023)
- Stats at NBA.com
- Stats at Basketball Reference

Alex Fudge (born May 6, 2003) is an American professional basketball player for the Rio Grande Valley Vipers of the NBA G League. He played college basketball for the LSU Tigers and Florida Gators.

== High school career ==
Fudge played high school basketball at Robert E. Lee Senior High School (now named Riverside High School) in Jacksonville, Florida.

=== Recruiting ===
Coming out of high school, Fudge was a highly ranked recruit in the Class of 2020. He was ranked as a 4-star recruit by both ESPN and 247Sports recruiting services.

Fudge was heavily pursued by several universities and received 26 college offers according to 247Sports, alongside one Irish basketball team, the Sligo Allstars. From his 27 offers, Fudge narrowed his list down to 10 finalists, which included Alabama, Arkansas, Florida, Georgia, Georgia Tech, LSU, South Carolina, Texas, Texas A&M and UCF. Fudge ultimately committed to play basketball at LSU.

== College career ==
=== LSU (2021–22) ===
Fudge played one season for the LSU Tigers in 2021–22, averaging 3.3 points per game and appearing in 29 games as a freshman. Fudge appeared in the 2022 NCAA tournament in the Tigers first round tourney loss to Iowa State. At LSU, Fudge played alongside future NBA players Tari Eason and Darius Days. During the season Fudge stubbed his toe playing shuffleboard and missed 1 match.

=== Florida (2022–23) ===
After one season at LSU, Fudge transferred to Florida for his sophomore season. At Florida, Fudge averaged 5.8 points and 4.5 rebounds per game and appeared in 32 games for the Gators.

== Professional career ==
=== Los Angeles / South Bay Lakers (2023–2024) ===
After going undrafted in the 2023 NBA draft, Fudge joined the Los Angeles Lakers for the 2023 NBA Summer League, averaging 3.0 points per game and on July 26, 2023, he signed a two-way contract. Fudge was honored as a part of the Lakers team that won the inaugural 2023 NBA In-Season Tournament game. On January 6, 2024, he was waived by the Lakers along with D'Moi Hodge and four days later, he joined the South Bay Lakers.

=== Dallas Mavericks / Texas Legends (2024) ===
On March 4, 2024, Fudge signed a two-way contract with the Dallas Mavericks. Fudge reached the NBA Finals where the Mavericks lost to the Boston Celtics in 5 games. On August 27, he was waived by the Mavericks.

=== Return to South Bay (2024–2025) ===
On September 5, 2024, Fudge signed with the Los Angeles Lakers, but was waived the next day. On October 26, 2024, he rejoined the South Bay Lakers.

=== Sioux Falls Skyforce (2025–2026) ===
On September 16, 2025, Fudge was traded to the Sioux Falls Skyforce in a three-team trade involving the College Park Skyhawks.

=== Ottawa BlackJacks (2026) ===
On April 2, 2026, Fudge signed with the Ottawa BlackJacks of the Canadian Elite Basketball League (CEBL).

== National team career ==
=== FIBA 3x3 U23 World Cup ===
Fudge represented the US in the 2024 FIBA 3x3 U23 World Cup. This event marked Fudge's first time competing for USA Basketball.

== Career statistics ==
Legend
GP	Games played	GS	Games started	MPG	Minutes per game
FG%	Field goal percentage	3P%	3-point field goal percentage	FT%	Free throw percentage
RPG	Rebounds per game	APG	Assists per game	SPG	Steals per game
BPG	Blocks per game	PPG	Points per game	**Bold**	Career high

=== NBA ===
Year	Team	GP	GS	MPG	FG%	3P%	FT%	RPG	APG	SPG	BPG	PPG
2023–24	L.A. Lakers	**4**	0	3.6	.167	.000	1.000	.5	.0	.0	.0	1.0
2023–24	Dallas	2	0	**12.9**	**.556**	**.333**	—	**1.5**	.0	**1.5**	.0	**5.5**
Career		6	0	6.7	.400	.200	1.000	.8	.0	.5	.0	2.5
