= Daniel Gafford =

American basketball player (born 1998)

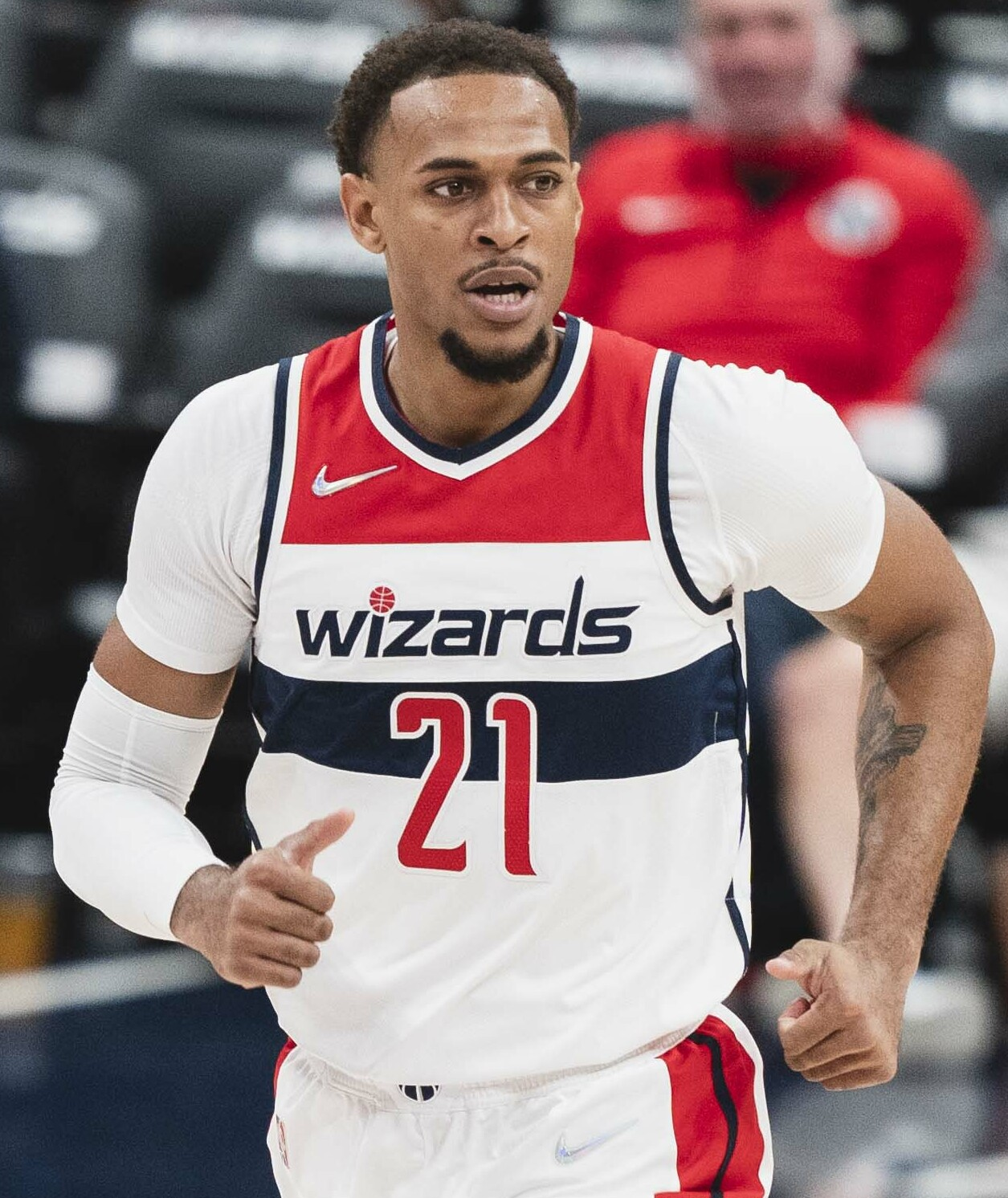
- Gafford with the Washington Wizards in 2021

No. 21 – Dallas Mavericks
- Position: Center / power forward
- League: NBA

Personal information
- Born: October 1, 1998 (age 28) El Dorado, Arkansas, U.S.
- Listed height: 6 ft 10 in (2.08 m)
- Listed weight: 265 lb (120 kg)

Career information
- High school: El Dorado (El Dorado, Arkansas)
- College: Arkansas (2017–2019)
- NBA draft: 2019: 2nd round, 38th overall pick
- Drafted by: Chicago Bulls
- Playing career: 2019–present

Career history
- 2019–2021: Chicago Bulls
- 2019: →Windy City Bulls
- 2021–2024: Washington Wizards
- 2024–present: Dallas Mavericks

Career highlights
- First-team All-SEC (2019); SEC All-Defensive team (2019); SEC All-Freshman team (2018); Mr. Basketball of Arkansas (2017)
- Stats at NBA.com
- Stats at Basketball Reference

Daniel Gafford (born October 1, 1998) is an American professional basketball player for the Dallas Mavericks of the National Basketball Association (NBA). He played college basketball for the Arkansas Razorbacks and was drafted in the second round of the 2019 NBA draft by the Chicago Bulls. He plays both the power forward and center positions.

== High school career ==
Gafford was a four star recruit in high school, and received offers in 2015 from multiple schools, including Kansas, Vanderbilt, and Florida. Gafford also used to play American football growing up and played at wide receiver until ninth grade at El Dorado High School. He was also in the marching band and credits that to the development of his skill set.

On August 1, 2015, Gafford committed to the University of Arkansas.

== College career ==
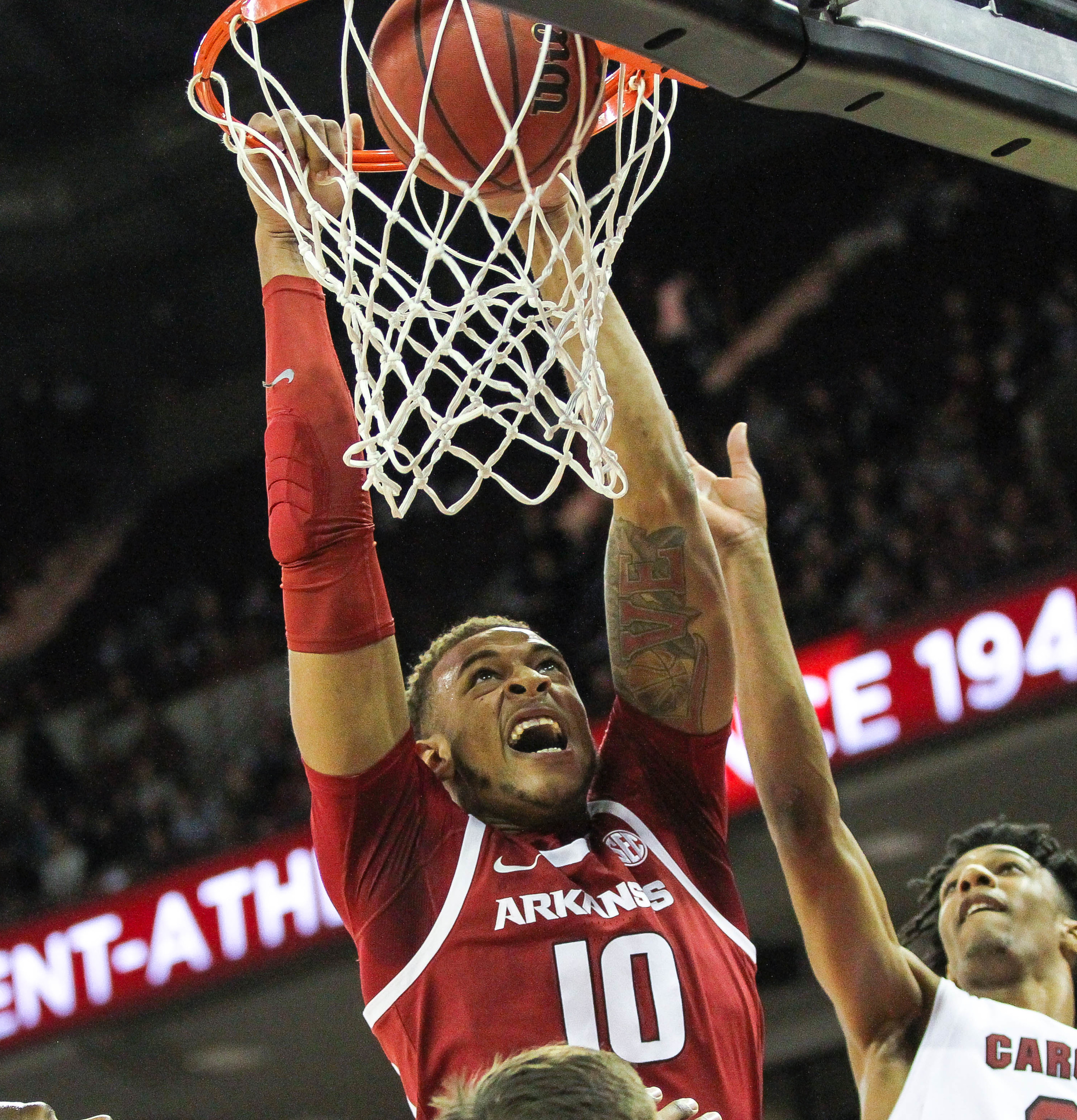
Gafford dunking for the Arkansas Razorbacks

In his first start for the Razorbacks, Gafford finished a perfect 8 for 8 shooting, along with 7 rebounds and 6 blocks against Minnesota. Gafford posted 21 points, 10 rebounds and seven blocks against No. 14 Auburn. After a freshman season where he averaged 11.8 points 6.2 rebounds per game, Gafford announced that he would return to Arkansas for his sophomore year rather than declare for the 2018 NBA draft. After his freshman season, Gafford was named to the SEC All-Freshman team.

Gafford improved his statistics during his second year at Arkansas, averaging 16.9 points, 8.6 rebounds, and 1.9 blocks per game. He was named to the 2019 SEC All-Defensive Team, as well as a 1st Team All-SEC pick. On March 18, 2019, after Gafford's sophomore season, it was announced that Gafford would skip the 2019 National Invitation Tournament to prepare for the 2019 NBA draft.

== Professional career ==
=== Chicago Bulls (2019–2021) ===
Gafford was the 38th overall selection by the Chicago Bulls in the 2019 NBA draft. On July 8, 2019, the Chicago Bulls declared that they had signed Gafford. On October 26, 2019, Gafford played his NBA debut, coming off the bench in an 84–108 loss to the Toronto Raptors with a rebound. He was assigned to the Windy City Bulls for opening night of the NBA G League season. On January 15, 2020, Gafford injured his thumb just 1 minute and 21 seconds into a match against the Washington Wizards. The next day, it was announced that he wouldn't play for around two to four weeks because he had a dislocated thumb.

=== Washington Wizards (2021–2024) ===
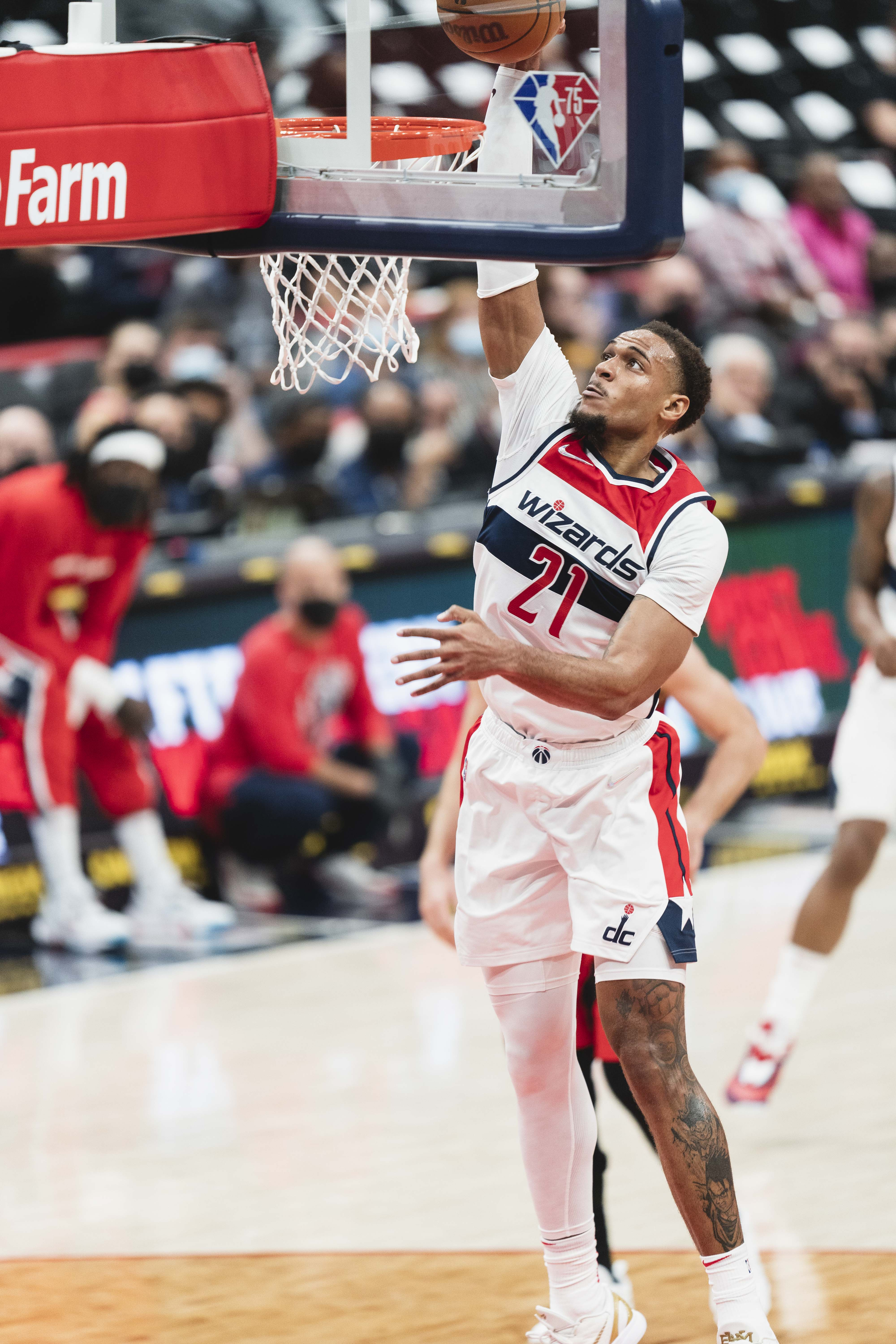
Gafford dunking for the Washington Wizards

On March 25, 2021, Gafford was traded to the Washington Wizards in a three-team trade involving the Boston Celtics. During the 2021 NBA playoffs, Daniel Gafford broke the record for field goal percentage (minimum 15 shot attempts) with an astounding 84.6%.

On October 18, 2021, Gafford signed a three-year, $40.2 million contract extension with the Wizards.

On March 7, 2023, Gafford made a buzzer-beating, game-winning putback in a 119–117 win over the Detroit Pistons.

=== Dallas Mavericks (2024–present) ===
On February 8, 2024, Gafford was traded to the Dallas Mavericks for Richaun Holmes and draft compensation. Two days later, on February 10, Gafford made his Mavericks debut, recording 19 points and nine rebounds in a 146–111 win over the Oklahoma City Thunder.

Shortly after joining the Mavericks, Gafford set a record of 33 consecutive made field goals, second all-time to Wilt Chamberlain's record of 35. The streak lasted from March 5 to 13, 2024.

Gafford finished the 2023–2024 season as the NBA field goal percentage leader, with a percentage of 72.5% with 348 out of 480 shots made. Gafford helped the Mavericks reach the NBA Finals where they lost to the Boston Celtics in five games.

On January 15, 2025, Gafford put up a career-high 27 points, along with 12 rebounds in a 119–116 loss to the New Orleans Pelicans. On January 20, Gafford put up a career-high 31 points, along with 15 rebounds, seven blocks, three assists, and one steal in a 110–105 loss to the Charlotte Hornets. He signed a three-year, $54 million contract extension with Dallas on July 12.

== Career statistics ==
Legend
GP	Games played	GS	Games started	MPG	Minutes per game
FG%	Field goal percentage	3P%	3-point field goal percentage	FT%	Free throw percentage
RPG	Rebounds per game	APG	Assists per game	SPG	Steals per game
BPG	Blocks per game	PPG	Points per game	**Bold**	Career high
*	Led the league

=== NBA ===
==== Regular season ====
Year	Team	GP	GS	MPG	FG%	3P%	FT%	RPG	APG	SPG	BPG	PPG
2019–20	Chicago	43	7	14.2	.701	—	.533	2.5	.5	.3	1.3	5.1
2020–21	Chicago	31	11	12.4	.690	—	.659	3.3	.5	.4	1.1	4.7
2020–21	Washington	23	0	17.8	.681	—	.672	5.6	.5	.7	1.8	10.1
2021–22	Washington	72	**53**	20.1	.693	.000	.699	5.7	.9	.4	1.4	9.4
2022–23	Washington	**78**	47	20.6	.732	—	.679	5.6	1.1	.4	1.3	9.0
2023–24	Washington	45	45	**26.5**	.690*	—	**.706**	**8.0**	1.5	**1.0**	**2.2**	10.9
2023–24	Dallas	29	21	21.5	**.780***	—	.607	6.9	**1.6**	.7	1.9	11.2
2024–25	Dallas	57	31	21.5	.702	—	.689	6.8	1.4	.4	1.8	**12.3**
2025–26	Dallas	55	44	21.7	.655	—	.683	6.9	1.1	.8	1.3	9.5
Career		433	259	20.1	.702	.000	.674	5.8	1.1	.5	1.5	9.3

==== Playoffs ====
Year	Team	GP	GS	MPG	FG%	3P%	FT%	RPG	APG	SPG	BPG	PPG
2021	Washington	5	2	**23.4**	**.846**	—	.625	**5.8**	.6	**1.0**	**2.0**	**11.8**
2024	Dallas	**22***	**22***	20.2	.634	—	**.631**	5.5	**.7**	.3	1.5	9.0
Career		27	24	20.8	.671	—	.629	5.6	.7	.4	1.6	9.5

=== College ===
Year	Team	GP	GS	MPG	FG%	3P%	FT%	RPG	APG	SPG	BPG	PPG
2017–18	Arkansas	**35**	26	22.6	.605	–	.528	6.2	**.7**	.5	**2.2**	11.8
2018–19	Arkansas	32	**32**	**28.7**	**.660**	–	**.591**	**8.6**	**.7**	**.9**	1.9	**16.9**
Career		67	58	25.5	.635	–	.562	7.4	.7	.7	2.1	14.5

== Personal life ==
Gafford is an avid watcher and fan of anime. He's expressed his love and support for Black Clover, stating how he named his dog after one of the characters, Mereoleona Vermillion. Gafford also explained how the manga's main character, Asta, helped him out as a player by never giving up. Gafford even has anime-inspired tattoos.
