= D'Moi Hodge =

British Virgin Islands basketball player (born 1998)

No. 11 – Palmer Basket
- Position: Shooting guard
- League: Primera FEB

Personal information
- Born: December 20, 1998 (age 27) Tortola, British Virgin Islands
- Listed height: 6 ft 3 in (1.91 m)
- Listed weight: 185 lb (84 kg)

Career information
- High school: Faith Baptist Christian Academy (Ludowici, Georgia)
- College: State College of Florida (2018–2020); Cleveland State (2020–2022); Missouri (2022–2023)
- NBA draft: 2023: undrafted
- Playing career: 2023–present

Career history
- 2023–2024: Los Angeles Lakers
- 2023–2024: →South Bay Lakers
- 2024: Rip City Remix
- 2024–2025: Aris Thessaloniki
- 2025: Texas Legends
- 2026: Frayles de Guasave
- 2026–present: Palmer Basket

Career highlights
- NBA Cup champion (2023); First-team All-Horizon League (2022); Horizon League Defensive Player of the Year (2022); Horizon League All-Defensive Team (2022)
- Stats at NBA.com
- Stats at Basketball Reference

D'Moi Malike Hodge (/dəˈmɔɪ/ də-MOY; born December 20, 1998) is a British Virgin Islander professional basketball player for Palmer Basket of the Spanish Primera FEB. He played college basketball for the State College of Florida, Cleveland State, and Missouri.

== Early life and high school career ==
Hodge was born on December 20, 1998, in Tortola, British Virgin Islands, to Courtney Hodge and Cleopatria King Defreitas. He started to play basketball at a community court behind his house where he played with his cousins and friends.

Hodge moved to the United States as a teenager but returned one year later due to homesickness. He decided to go back to the United States at the age of 17 to pursue his goals that were not possible in the Islands. Hodge played his senior year of high school basketball at Faith Baptist Christian Academy in Ludowici, Georgia. While at Faith Baptist Christian Academy, Hodge earned league MVP and championship MVP honors.

== College career ==
Coming out of high school, Hodge was not ranked as a college basketball recruit by major recruiting services. Hodge began his college basketball career with New Mexico Junior College (2017–18), but chose to redshirt and never played a game for the college, transferring to State College of Florida for the 2018–19 season.

At the State College of Florida, Hodge began to emerge as one of the best junior college players in the country. Over his two seasons in the junior college ranks, Hodge averaged 22.3 points per game. He received numerous honors, including being named to the FCSAA All-State and NJCAA All-Region VIII team. In the Junior College Recruiting Rankings, Hodge was ranked as the 11th-best JUCO player in the country.

Hodge would spend two seasons at the State College of Florida, before transferring to Cleveland State University, joining the Cleveland State Vikings who compete at the NCAA Division I level of college basketball. In a game against Purdue University Fort Wayne on Dec. 20, 2020, Hodge recorded his Division I career-high in scoring, recording 46 points, seven rebounds, three assists, four steals and one block. Hodge set numerous records for the Cleveland State basketball program, including: three-pointers in a game (10), most made three-pointers in a half (8), most points scored by a junior (46) and most points scored in a first half (31).

After two seasons at Cleveland State, Hodge transferred to the University of Missouri for his graduate season. Hodge would average 14.7 points per game in his lone season at Missouri. He was the second leading scorer on the Tigers behind Kobe Brown. He would help the Tigers to an appearance in the 2023 NCAA Division I men's basketball tournament and a first round victory over Utah State University, 76–65.

== Professional career ==
After going undrafted in the 2023 NBA draft, Hodge signed a two-way contract with the Los Angeles Lakers on July 3, 2023. On November 4, he became the first British Virgin Islander to ever play in the NBA. Hodge was later honored as a part of the Lakers team that won the inaugural 2023 NBA In-Season Tournament game. On January 6, 2024, he was waived by the Lakers along with Alex Fudge and ten days later, he joined the South Bay Lakers.

On January 17, 2024, Hodge was traded by the South Bay Lakers to the Rip City Remix for a 2025 first round pick, subsequently joining the team.

On August 5, 2024, Hodge signed with Greek club Aris Thessaloniki.

On September 19, 2025, Hodge signed with the Dallas Mavericks. Five days later on September 24, 2025 he was waived by the team and later joined the Mavericks G-League affiliate, the Texas Legends.

On April 2, 2026, Hodge signed with the Frayles de Guasave.

== Career statistics ==
Legend
GP	Games played	GS	Games started	MPG	Minutes per game
FG%	Field goal percentage	3P%	3-point field goal percentage	FT%	Free throw percentage
RPG	Rebounds per game	APG	Assists per game	SPG	Steals per game
BPG	Blocks per game	PPG	Points per game	**Bold**	Career high

=== NBA ===
Year	Team	GP	GS	MPG	FG%	3P%	FT%	RPG	APG	SPG	BPG	PPG
2023–24	L.A. Lakers	7	0	5.9	.333	.250	.500	.0	.7	.1	.1	2.0
Career		7	0	5.9	.333	.250	.500	.0	.7	.1	.1	2.0
