= Jaden Hardy =

American basketball player (born 2002)

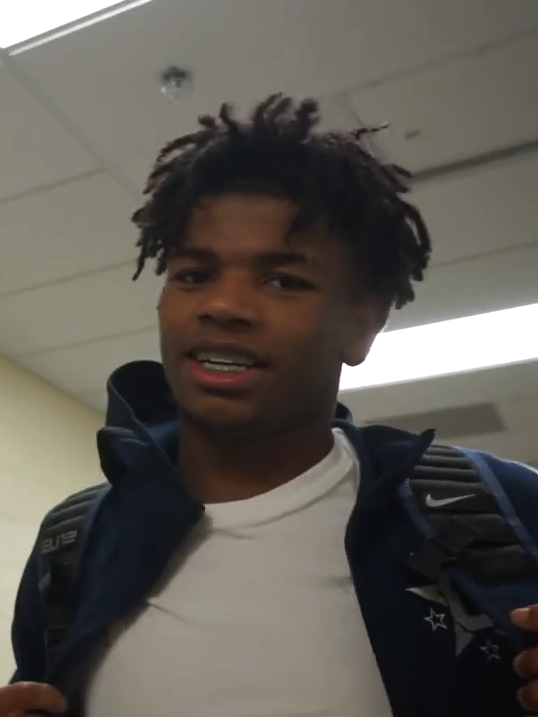
- Hardy in 2019

No. 7 – Los Angeles Lakers
- Position: Shooting guard
- League: NBA

Personal information
- Born: July 5, 2002 (age 24) Detroit, Michigan, U.S.
- Listed height: 6 ft 4 in (1.93 m)
- Listed weight: 198 lb (90 kg)

Career information
- High school: Coronado (Henderson, Nevada)
- NBA draft: 2022: 2nd round, 37th overall pick
- Drafted by: Sacramento Kings
- Playing career: 2021–present

Career history
- 2021–2022: NBA G League Ignite
- 2022–2026: Dallas Mavericks
- 2022: →Texas Legends
- 2026: Washington Wizards
- 2026–present: Los Angeles Lakers

Career highlights
- McDonald's All-American (2021)
- Stats at NBA.com
- Stats at Basketball Reference

Jaden Amere Hardy (born July 5, 2002) is an American professional basketball player for the Los Angeles Lakers of the National Basketball Association (NBA). He was a consensus five-star recruit and one of the top players in the 2021 class.

Instead of playing college basketball, Hardy joined the NBA G League Ignite, a developmental team in the NBA G League, in 2021. He was drafted in the second round of the 2022 NBA draft and played for the Dallas Mavericks for four seasons, with whom he reached the 2024 NBA Finals. He was traded to the Washington Wizards during the 2025–26 season, and then to the Lakers during the 2026 off-season.

== Early life ==
Hardy and his family moved to Henderson, Nevada from Detroit, before high school. He attended Coronado High School in Henderson. As a junior, Hardy averaged 30.4 points, 9.1 rebounds and 8.4 assists per game, earning Nevada Gatorade Player of the Year and Las Vegas Review-Journal Boys Athlete of the Year honors. On January 8, 2021, he opted out from the remainder of his senior season. He was named to the rosters for the McDonald's All-American Game, Jordan Brand Classic and Nike Hoop Summit.

Hardy was a consensus five-star recruit and one of the best players in the 2021 class. Most recruiting analysts predicted that he would play professionally instead of attending college, with Kentucky and UCLA being his most likely college destinations. On May 15, 2021, he announced that he would join the NBA G League, forgoing college basketball. He chose the G League over offers from Kentucky and UCLA, among others.

College recruiting
Name	Hometown	School	Height	Weight	Commit date
Jaden Hardy; SG	Detroit, MI	Coronado (NV)	6 ft 4 in (1.93 m)	190 lb (86 kg)	—
Jaden Hardy; SG	Recruit ratings: Rivals: 247Sports: ESPN: (97)				
Overall recruit ranking: Rivals: 5 247Sports: 3 ESPN: 2
Note: In many cases, Scout, Rivals, 247Sports, On3, and ESPN may conflict in their listings of height and weight.; In these cases, the average was taken. ESPN grades are on a 100-point scale.; Sources: "2021 Team Ranking". Rivals.

== Professional career ==
=== NBA G League Ignite (2021–2022) ===
On June 9, 2021, Hardy signed with the NBA G League Ignite, a developmental team affiliated with the NBA G League. He averaged 17.7 points, 4.6 rebounds and 3.2 assists per game, shooting 35.1 percent from the field.

=== Dallas Mavericks (2022–2026) ===
Hardy was drafted 37th in the 2022 NBA draft by the Sacramento Kings, and traded on draft night to the Dallas Mavericks. He joined the Mavericks for the 2022 NBA Summer League. On July 7, 2022, Hardy made his Summer League debut against the Chicago Bulls with 28 points, four rebounds, three assists, and one steal in a 100–99 loss. On February 6, 2023, he scored a career-high 29 points in a 124–111 win over the Utah Jazz. On March 11, Hardy started his first game in the NBA, recording 22 points, two rebounds and three assists in a 112–108 loss to the Memphis Grizzlies. He made 48 total appearances (including five starts) for Dallas during his rookie campaign, recording averages of 8.8 points, 1.9 rebounds, and 1.4 assists.

Hardy made 73 appearances (including seven starts) for the Mavericks during the 2023–24 NBA season, averaging 7.3 points, 1.8 rebounds, and 1.5 assists. Hardy reached the 2024 NBA Finals where the Mavericks lost to the Boston Celtics in five games.

Prior to the start of the 2024–25 NBA season, Hardy signed a three-year, $18 million extension that would keep him under contract through 2028. Hardy played in 57 games (including three starts) for Dallas during the regular season, averaging 8.7 points, 1.6 rebounds, and 1.4 assists.

Hardy made 34 appearances (including four starts) for the Mavericks during the 2025–26 NBA season, recording averages of 6.9 points, 1.4 rebounds, and 0.9 assists.

=== Washington Wizards (2026) ===
On February 5, 2026, Hardy was traded to the Washington Wizards in a three-team trade involving the Charlotte Hornets. On February 11, Hardy made his debut with the Wizards, where he tallied up 11 points, two rebounds, and one assist in 15 minutes of gameplay in a 138–113 loss against the Cleveland Cavaliers. He made 23 appearances for Washington, logging averages of 12.6 points, 1.7 rebounds, and 1.3 assists.

=== Los Angeles Lakers (2026–present) ===
On July 7, 2026, Hardy, along with two future picks, was traded to the Los Angeles Lakers in exchange for Deandre Ayton. On October 21, Hardy made his Lakers debut, scoring three points in a 127–105 win over the Golden State Warriors.

== Career statistics ==
Legend
GP	Games played	GS	Games started	MPG	Minutes per game
FG%	Field goal percentage	3P%	3-point field goal percentage	FT%	Free throw percentage
RPG	Rebounds per game	APG	Assists per game	SPG	Steals per game
BPG	Blocks per game	PPG	Points per game	**Bold**	Career high

=== NBA ===
==== Regular season ====
Year	Team	GP	GS	MPG	FG%	3P%	FT%	RPG	APG	SPG	BPG	PPG
2022–23	Dallas	48	5	14.8	.438	.404	**.823**	**1.9**	1.4	.4	.1	8.8
2023–24	Dallas	**73**	**7**	13.6	.407	.362	.776	1.8	**1.5**	.3	.1	7.3
2024–25	Dallas	57	3	15.9	.435	.386	.698	1.6	1.4	**.5**	.1	8.7
2025–26	Dallas	34	4	12.6	.402	.371	.775	1.4	.9	.3	.1	6.9
2025–26	Washington	23	0	**20.4**	**.443**	**.420**	.686	1.7	1.3	.3	**.2**	**12.6**
Career		235	19	14.9	.425	.386	.756	1.7	1.3	.4	.1	8.4

==== Playoffs ====
Year	Team	GP	GS	MPG	FG%	3P%	FT%	RPG	APG	SPG	BPG	PPG
2024	Dallas	19	0	6.8	.426	.407	.733	.8	.9	.2	.0	4.2
Career		19	0	6.8	.426	.407	.733	.8	.9	.2	.0	4.2

== Personal life ==
Hardy's older brother, Amauri, played college basketball for UNLV and the University of Oregon. His father, Ramsey, was on Tuskegee University's basketball team.
