= 2023–24 Los Angeles Lakers season =

American professional basketball season

- NBA Cup champions
- Head coach: Darvin Ham
- President: Jeanie Buss; Rob Pelinka (vice)
- General manager: Rob Pelinka
- Owners: Jerry Buss family trust (majority); Jeanie Buss (controlling owner); Mark Walter, Todd Boehly, Edward P. Roski, and Patrick Soon-Shiong (minority)
- Arena: Crypto.com Arena

Results
- Record: 47–35 (.573)
- Place: Division: 3rd (Pacific); Conference: 8th (Western)
- Playoff finish: First round (lost to Nuggets 1–4)
- Stats at Basketball Reference

Local media
- Television: Spectrum SportsNet
- Radio: ESPN LA 710 (English); 1020 Radio AM (Spanish)

The 2023–24 Los Angeles Lakers season was the 77th season of the franchise, its 76th season in the National Basketball Association (NBA), its 64th season in Los Angeles, and its 25th season playing home games at Crypto.com Arena. This was the Lakers' second and final season with Darvin Ham as head coach, with Ham joining the team as the Lakers coach on June 3, 2022, before the end of the 2021–22 season.

Prior to the start of the season, LeBron James announced that he would switch his jersey number back to #23 after wearing #6 (which he also wore with the Miami Heat) the previous two seasons. On August 24, 2023, the Lakers announced that a statue of Kobe Bryant would be unveiled in front of Crypto.com Arena on February 8, 2024.

The Lakers held a perfect 7–0 record in the inaugural In-Season Tournament, winning the inaugural NBA Cup on December 9 by defeating the Indiana Pacers. The Lakers improved to the 4th seed in the Western Conference after their In-Season Tournament run, having a 14–9 record. However, they struggled immediately after the run, eventually falling to 17–19 in January and the 9th seed. Despite this, the Lakers finished the season 47–35, having a record of 23-10 since February 1. They moved up to the 8th seed in the Western Conference, which qualified them for the NBA Play-In Tournament for the second consecutive year. They defeated the New Orleans Pelicans 110–106 to go to the playoffs for a second consecutive year. The Lakers played the defending champion Denver Nuggets in the first round of the 2024 NBA playoffs, a rematch of the previous year's Western Conference Finals. However, the Nuggets won the series 4–1, which included two Jamal Murray game-winning shots in Games 2 and 5, respectively. This is the first time that the Lakers lost in the first round since 2021 when they lost to the eventual Conference champion Phoenix Suns in six games and the second time that James lost in the first round in his career, having also lost to the 2020–21 Suns.

On May 3, 2024, the Lakers fired their entire coaching staff, which includes head coach Darvin Ham, after serving for two seasons, and assistant coach Phil Handy, who had been with the team since their 2020 championship season.

The Los Angeles Lakers drew an average home attendance of 18,903 in 42 home games in the 2023-24 NBA season.

== Draft ==
| Round | Pick | Player | Position | Nationality | College / Team |
|---|---|---|---|---|---|
| 1 | 17 | Jalen Hood-Schifino | PG/SG | United States | Indiana (Fr.) |
| 2 | 47 | Mojave King | SG | New Zealand / United States | NBA G League Ignite (NBA G League) |

The Lakers held the 17th overall pick in the 2023 NBA draft, along with the 47th pick entering the draft. On draft day, in a four-team trade, they traded their 47th pick (which became NBA G League Ignite player Mojave King) and cash considerations to the Indiana Pacers for the 40th pick.

== Roster ==
2023–24 Los Angeles Lakers roster
Players

| Pos. | No. | Player | Height | Weight | DOB | From |
|---|---|---|---|---|---|---|
| C | 14 | Colin Castleton (TW) | 6 ft 11 in (2.11 m) | 231 lb (105 kg) | 2000-05-25 | Florida |
| G | 10 | Max Christie | 6 ft 5 in (1.96 m) | 190 lb (86 kg) | 2003-02-10 | Michigan State |
| F/C | 3 | Anthony Davis | 6 ft 10 in (2.08 m) | 255 lb (116 kg) | 1993-03-11 | Kentucky |
| G | 26 | Spencer Dinwiddie | 6 ft 5 in (1.96 m) | 215 lb (98 kg) | 1993-04-06 | Colorado |
| F/C | 20 | Harry III Giles (TW) | 6 ft 11 in (2.11 m) | 240 lb (109 kg) | 1998-04-22 | Duke |
| F | 28 | Rui Hachimura | 6 ft 8 in (2.03 m) | 230 lb (104 kg) | 1998-02-08 | Gonzaga |
| F/C | 11 | Jaxson Hayes | 7 ft 0 in (2.13 m) | 217 lb (98 kg) | 2000-05-23 | Texas |
| G | 0 | Jalen Hood-Schifino | 6 ft 5 in (1.96 m) | 215 lb (98 kg) | 2003-06-19 | Indiana |
| F | 23 | LeBron James | 6 ft 9 in (2.06 m) | 250 lb (113 kg) | 1984-12-30 | St. Vincent-St. Mary HS (OH) |
| F | 21 | Maxwell Lewis | 6 ft 7 in (2.01 m) | 205 lb (93 kg) | 2002-07-27 | Pepperdine |
| G | 4 | Skylar Mays (TW) | 6 ft 3 in (1.91 m) | 205 lb (93 kg) | 1997-09-05 | LSU |
| F | 12 | Taurean Prince | 6 ft 6 in (1.98 m) | 216 lb (98 kg) | 1994-03-22 | Baylor |
| G | 15 | Austin Reaves | 6 ft 5 in (1.96 m) | 206 lb (93 kg) | 1998-05-29 | Oklahoma |
| G/F | 5 | Cam Reddish | 6 ft 7 in (2.01 m) | 218 lb (99 kg) | 1999-09-01 | Duke |
| G | 1 | D'Angelo Russell | 6 ft 3 in (1.91 m) | 200 lb (91 kg) | 1996-02-23 | Ohio State |
| F | 2 | Jarred Vanderbilt | 6 ft 8 in (2.03 m) | 214 lb (97 kg) | 1999-04-03 | Kentucky |
| G | 7 | Gabe Vincent | 6 ft 2 in (1.88 m) | 195 lb (88 kg) | 1996-07-14 | UC Santa Barbara |
| F/C | 35 | Christian Wood | 6 ft 8 in (2.03 m) | 223 lb (101 kg) | 1995-09-27 | UNLV |

Coaches
Head coach
- Darvin Ham
Assistant(s)
- DeMarre Carroll
- J. D. DuBois
- Phil Handy
- Chris Jent
- Jordan Ott
- Zach Peterson
- Schuyler Rimmer

Legend
- (DP) Unsigned draft pick
- (FA) Free agent
- (S) Suspended
- (GL) On assignment to G League affiliate
- (TW) Two-way affiliate player
- (L) On leave from the team
- Injured

Roster
Updated: March 24, 2024

== Standings ==
=== Division ===
| Pacific Division | W | L | PCT | GB | Home | Road | Div | GP |
|---|---|---|---|---|---|---|---|---|
| y – Los Angeles Clippers | 51 | 31 | .622 | – | 25‍–‍16 | 26‍–‍15 | 9‍–‍7 | 82 |
| x – Phoenix Suns | 49 | 33 | .598 | 2.0 | 25‍–‍16 | 24‍–‍17 | 9‍–‍9 | 82 |
| x – Los Angeles Lakers | 47 | 35 | .573 | 4.0 | 28‍–‍14 | 19‍–‍21 | 7‍–‍10 | 82 |
| pi – Sacramento Kings | 46 | 36 | .561 | 5.0 | 24‍–‍17 | 22‍–‍19 | 10‍–‍7 | 82 |
| pi – Golden State Warriors | 46 | 36 | .561 | 5.0 | 21‍–‍20 | 25‍–‍16 | 7‍–‍9 | 82 |

=== Conference ===
Western Conference
| # | Team | W | L | PCT | GB | GP |
|---|---|---|---|---|---|---|
| 1 | c – Oklahoma City Thunder * | 57 | 25 | .695 | – | 82 |
| 2 | x – Denver Nuggets | 57 | 25 | .695 | – | 82 |
| 3 | x – Minnesota Timberwolves | 56 | 26 | .683 | 1.0 | 82 |
| 4 | y – Los Angeles Clippers * | 51 | 31 | .622 | 6.0 | 82 |
| 5 | y – Dallas Mavericks * | 50 | 32 | .610 | 7.0 | 82 |
| 6 | x – Phoenix Suns | 49 | 33 | .598 | 8.0 | 82 |
| 7 | x – New Orleans Pelicans | 49 | 33 | .598 | 8.0 | 82 |
| 8 | x – Los Angeles Lakers | 47 | 35 | .573 | 10.0 | 82 |
| 9 | pi – Sacramento Kings | 46 | 36 | .561 | 11.0 | 82 |
| 10 | pi – Golden State Warriors | 46 | 36 | .561 | 11.0 | 82 |
| 11 | Houston Rockets | 41 | 41 | .500 | 16.0 | 82 |
| 12 | Utah Jazz | 31 | 51 | .378 | 26.0 | 82 |
| 13 | Memphis Grizzlies | 27 | 55 | .329 | 30.0 | 82 |
| 14 | San Antonio Spurs | 22 | 60 | .268 | 35.0 | 82 |
| 15 | Portland Trail Blazers | 21 | 61 | .256 | 36.0 | 82 |

== Game log ==
=== Preseason ===
2023 preseason game log
Total: 2–4 (Home: 2–3; Road: 0–1)
Preseason: 2–4 (home: 2–3; road: 0–1)

| Game | Date | Team | Score | High points | High rebounds | High assists | Location Attendance | Record |
|---|---|---|---|---|---|---|---|---|
| 1 | October 7 | @ Golden State | L 108–125 | Christie, Davis, Russell (15) | Hachimura, Vanderbilt (7) | D'Angelo Russell (5) | Chase Center; 18,064 | 0–1 |
| 2 | October 9 | Brooklyn | W 129–126 | Rui Hachimura (19) | Davis, Hayes (7) | D'Angelo Russell (6) | T-Mobile Arena | 1–1 |
| 3 | October 11 | Sacramento | W 109–101 | D'Angelo Russell (21) | Castleton, Prince (7) | D'Angelo Russell (8) | Honda Center; 10,830 | 2–1 |
| 4 | October 13 | Golden State | L 125–129 | Taurean Prince (17) | Castleton, Wood (7) | D'Angelo Russell (6) | Crypto.com Arena; 18,997 | 2–2 |
| 5 | October 15 | Milwaukee | L 97–108 | Anthony Davis (16) | Anthony Davis (7) | Scotty Pippen Jr. (6) | Crypto.com Arena; 18,997 | 2–3 |
| 6 | October 19 | Phoenix | L 100–123 | LeBron James (19) | James, Wood (6) | D'Angelo Russell (6) | Acrisure Arena; 10,203 | 2–4 |

2023–24 season schedule

=== Regular season ===
2023–24 game log
Total: 47–35 (Home: 28–14; Road: 19–21)
October: 2–2 (home: 2–0; road: 0–2)

| Game | Date | Team | Score | High points | High rebounds | High assists | Location Attendance | Record |
|---|---|---|---|---|---|---|---|---|
| 1 | October 24 | @ Denver | L 107–119 | LeBron James (21) | James, Davis, Reaves (8) | D'Angelo Russell (7) | Ball Arena; 19,842 | 0–1 |
| 2 | October 26 | Phoenix | W 100–95 | Anthony Davis (30) | Anthony Davis (12) | LeBron James (9) | Crypto.com Arena; 18,997 | 1–1 |
| 3 | October 29 | @ Sacramento | L 127–132 (OT) | Anthony Davis (30) | Anthony Davis (16) | D'Angelo Russell (9) | Golden 1 Center; 18,198 | 1–2 |
| 4 | October 30 | Orlando | W 106–103 | D'Angelo Russell (28) | Anthony Davis (19) | D'Angelo Russell (8) | Crypto.com Arena; 18,997 | 2–2 |

November: 9–7 (home: 5–2; road: 4–5)

| Game | Date | Team | Score | High points | High rebounds | High assists | Location Attendance | Record |
|---|---|---|---|---|---|---|---|---|
| 5 | November 1 | L.A. Clippers | W 130–125 (OT) | LeBron James (35) | LeBron James (12) | James, Reaves (7) | Crypto.com Arena; 18,997 | 3–2 |
| 6 | November 4 | @ Orlando | L 101–120 | Anthony Davis (28) | Anthony Davis (13) | LeBron James (5) | Amway Center; 18,846 | 3–3 |
| 7 | November 6 | @ Miami | L 107–108 | LeBron James (30) | Austin Reaves (10) | Austin Reaves (9) | Kaseya Center; 19,725 | 3–4 |
| 8 | November 8 | @ Houston | L 94–128 | Rui Hachimura (24) | Christie, Hachimura (8) | Reaves, Russell (4) | Toyota Center; 18,055 | 3–5 |
| 9 | November 10 | @ Phoenix | W 122–119 | LeBron James (32) | Davis, James (11) | D'Angelo Russell (9) | Footprint Center; 17,071 | 4–5 |
| 10 | November 12 | Portland | W 116–110 | Anthony Davis (30) | Anthony Davis (13) | D'Angelo Russell (11) | Crypto.com Arena; 18,997 | 5–5 |
| 11 | November 14 | Memphis | W 134–107 | D'Angelo Russell (24) | Austin Reaves (12) | Austin Reaves (7) | Crypto.com Arena; 18,430 | 6–5 |
| 12 | November 15 | Sacramento | L 110–125 | James, Russell (28) | Austin Reaves (11) | LeBron James (12) | Crypto.com Arena; 18,687 | 6–6 |
| 13 | November 17 | @ Portland | W 107–95 | LeBron James (35) | Anthony Davis (14) | LeBron James (9) | Moda Center; 18,570 | 7–6 |
| 14 | November 19 | Houston | W 105–104 | LeBron James (37) | Anthony Davis (10) | LeBron James (8) | Crypto.com Arena; 18,997 | 8–6 |
| 15 | November 21 | Utah | W 131–99 | Anthony Davis (26) | Anthony Davis (16) | LeBron James (9) | Crypto.com Arena; 18,997 | 9–6 |
| 16 | November 22 | Dallas | L 101–104 | LeBron James (26) | Anthony Davis (13) | LeBron James (7) | Crypto.com Arena; 18,997 | 9–7 |
| 17 | November 25 | @ Cleveland | W 121–115 | Anthony Davis (32) | Anthony Davis (13) | Austin Reaves (10) | Rocket Mortgage FieldHouse; 19,432 | 10–7 |
| 18 | November 27 | @ Philadelphia | L 94–138 | LeBron James (18) | Anthony Davis (11) | D'Angelo Russell (7) | Wells Fargo Center; 19,907 | 10–8 |
| 19 | November 29 | @ Detroit | W 133–107 | D'Angelo Russell (35) | Anthony Davis (16) | D'Angelo Russell (9) | Little Caesars Arena; 20,062 | 11–8 |
| 20 | November 30 | @ Oklahoma City | L 110–133 | Anthony Davis (31) | Anthony Davis (14) | D'Angelo Russell (10) | Paycom Center; 17,401 | 11–9 |

December: 6–8 (home: 4–2; road: 2–6)

| Game | Date | Team | Score | High points | High rebounds | High assists | Location Attendance | Record |
|---|---|---|---|---|---|---|---|---|
| 21 | December 2 | Houston | W 107–97 | Anthony Davis (27) | Anthony Davis (14) | James, Russell (7) | Crypto.com Arena; 18,997 | 12–9 |
| 22 | December 5 | Phoenix | W 106–103 | LeBron James (31) | Anthony Davis (15) | LeBron James (11) | Crypto.com Arena; 18,664 | 13–9 |
| 23 | December 7 | New Orleans | W 133–89 | LeBron James (30) | Anthony Davis (15) | LeBron James (8) | T-Mobile Arena; 18,017 | 14–9 |
| | December 9 | Indiana | W 123–109 | Anthony Davis (41) | Anthony Davis (20) | D'Angelo Russell (7) | T-Mobile Arena; 19,021 | |
| 24 | December 12 | @ Dallas | L 125–127 | Anthony Davis (37) | Anthony Davis (11) | LeBron James (9) | American Airlines Center; 20,377 | 14–10 |
| 25 | December 13 | @ San Antonio | W 122–119 | Anthony Davis (37) | Anthony Davis (10) | D'Angelo Russell (10) | Frost Bank Center; 18,354 | 15–10 |
| 26 | December 15 | @ San Antonio | L 115–129 | LeBron James (23) | Christian Wood (8) | LeBron James (14) | Frost Bank Center; 18,354 | 15–11 |
| 27 | December 18 | New York | L 109–114 | Anthony Davis (32) | Anthony Davis (14) | LeBron James (11) | Crypto.com Arena; 18,997 | 15–12 |
| 28 | December 20 | @ Chicago | L 108–124 | LeBron James (25) | Anthony Davis (14) | LeBron James (9) | United Center; 21,234 | 15–13 |
| 29 | December 21 | @ Minnesota | L 111–118 | Anthony Davis (31) | Davis, Reaves (8) | D'Angelo Russell (8) | Target Center; 18,024 | 15–14 |
| 30 | December 23 | @ Oklahoma City | W 129–120 | LeBron James (40) | Anthony Davis (11) | Austin Reaves (9) | Paycom Center; 18,203 | 16–14 |
| 31 | December 25 | Boston | L 115–126 | Anthony Davis (40) | Anthony Davis (13) | LeBron James (8) | Crypto.com Arena; 18,997 | 16–15 |
| 32 | December 28 | Charlotte | W 133–112 | Anthony Davis (26) | Anthony Davis (8) | LeBron James (11) | Crypto.com Arena; 18,997 | 17–15 |
| 33 | December 30 | @ Minnesota | L 106–108 | Anthony Davis (33) | Anthony Davis (17) | Anthony Davis (8) | Target Center; 18,024 | 17–16 |
| 34 | December 31 | @ New Orleans | L 109–129 | LeBron James (34) | Anthony Davis (10) | Austin Reaves (9) | Smoothie King Center; 18,434 | 17–17 |

January: 7–8 (home: 6–4; road: 1–4)

| Game | Date | Team | Score | High points | High rebounds | High assists | Location Attendance | Record |
|---|---|---|---|---|---|---|---|---|
| 35 | January 3 | Miami | L 96–110 | Anthony Davis (29) | Anthony Davis (17) | LeBron James (9) | Crypto.com Arena; 18,997 | 17–18 |
| 36 | January 5 | Memphis | L 113–127 | LeBron James (32) | Austin Reaves (7) | Austin Reaves (12) | Crypto.com Arena; 18,997 | 17–19 |
| 37 | January 7 | L.A. Clippers | W 106–103 | LeBron James (25) | Davis, Wood (10) | LeBron James (7) | Crypto.com Arena; 18,997 | 18–19 |
| 38 | January 9 | Toronto | W 132–131 | Anthony Davis (41) | Anthony Davis (11) | LeBron James (12) | Crypto.com Arena; 18,997 | 19–19 |
| 39 | January 11 | Phoenix | L 109–127 | D'Angelo Russell (19) | Jarred Vanderbilt (9) | LeBron James (9) | Crypto.com Arena; 18,416 | 19–20 |
| 40 | January 13 | @ Utah | L 125–132 | D'Angelo Russell (39) | Anthony Davis (15) | Anthony Davis (11) | Delta Center; 18,206 | 19–21 |
| 41 | January 15 | Oklahoma City | W 112–105 | Anthony Davis (27) | Anthony Davis (15) | Austin Reaves (7) | Crypto.com Arena; 18,997 | 20–21 |
| 42 | January 17 | Dallas | W 127–110 | D'Angelo Russell (29) | Anthony Davis (12) | Anthony Davis (9) | Crypto.com Arena; 18,338 | 21–21 |
| 43 | January 19 | Brooklyn | L 112–130 | Anthony Davis (26) | Anthony Davis (12) | D'Angelo Russell (7) | Crypto.com Arena; 18,997 | 21–22 |
| 44 | January 21 | Portland | W 134–110 | D'Angelo Russell (34) | Anthony Davis (14) | D'Angelo Russell (8) | Crypto.com Arena; 18,997 | 22–22 |
| 45 | January 23 | @ L.A. Clippers | L 116–127 | D'Angelo Russell (27) | Anthony Davis (12) | D'Angelo Russell (10) | Crypto.com Arena; 19,370 | 22–23 |
| 46 | January 25 | Chicago | W 141–132 | D'Angelo Russell (29) | Anthony Davis (11) | LeBron James (12) | Crypto.com Arena; 18,997 | 23–23 |
| 47 | January 27 | @ Golden State | W 145–144 (2OT) | LeBron James (36) | LeBron James (20) | LeBron James (12) | Chase Center; 18,064 | 24–23 |
| 48 | January 29 | @ Houston | L 119–135 | Davis, James, Russell (23) | Anthony Davis (7) | LeBron James (10) | Toyota Center; 18,055 | 24–24 |
| 49 | January 30 | @ Atlanta | L 122–138 | Austin Reaves (28) | LeBron James (9) | LeBron James (8) | State Farm Arena; 17,871 | 24–25 |

February: 9–3 (home: 4–1; road: 5–2)

| Game | Date | Team | Score | High points | High rebounds | High assists | Location Attendance | Record |
|---|---|---|---|---|---|---|---|---|
| 50 | February 1 | @ Boston | W 114–105 | Austin Reaves (32) | Jaxson Hayes (10) | D'Angelo Russell (14) | TD Garden; 19,156 | 25–25 |
| 51 | February 3 | @ New York | W 113–105 | LeBron James (24) | Anthony Davis (18) | Austin Reaves (7) | Madison Square Garden; 19,812 | 26–25 |
| 52 | February 5 | @ Charlotte | W 124–118 | D'Angelo Russell (28) | Anthony Davis (15) | Davis, Reaves (11) | Spectrum Center; 19,375 | 27–25 |
| 53 | February 8 | Denver | L 106–114 | Anthony Davis (32) | Davis, James (9) | Austin Reaves (10) | Crypto.com Arena; 18,997 | 27–26 |
| 54 | February 9 | New Orleans | W 139–122 | D'Angelo Russell (30) | Jaxson Hayes (8) | LeBron James (14) | Crypto.com Arena; 18,997 | 28–26 |
| 55 | February 13 | Detroit | W 125–111 | LeBron James (25) | Anthony Davis (14) | LeBron James (8) | Crypto.com Arena; 18,997 | 29–26 |
| 56 | February 14 | @ Utah | W 138–122 | Anthony Davis (37) | Anthony Davis (15) | D'Angelo Russell (17) | Delta Center; 18,206 | 30–26 |
| 57 | February 22 | @ Golden State | L 110–128 | Anthony Davis (27) | Anthony Davis (15) | D'Angelo Russell (9) | Chase Center; 18,064 | 30–27 |
| 58 | February 23 | San Antonio | W 123–118 | LeBron James (30) | Anthony Davis (13) | James, Reaves (9) | Crypto.com Arena; 18,997 | 31–27 |
| 59 | February 25 | @ Phoenix | L 113–123 | LeBron James (28) | Anthony Davis (14) | LeBron James (12) | Footprint Center; 17,071 | 31–28 |
| 60 | February 28 | @ L.A. Clippers | W 116–112 | LeBron James (34) | Anthony Davis (12) | LeBron James (8) | Crypto.com Arena; 19,370 | 32–28 |
| 61 | February 29 | Washington | W 134–131 (OT) | Anthony Davis (40) | Anthony Davis (15) | LeBron James (9) | Crypto.com Arena; 18,997 | 33–28 |

March: 9–5 (home: 6–3; road: 3–2)

| Game | Date | Team | Score | High points | High rebounds | High assists | Location Attendance | Record |
|---|---|---|---|---|---|---|---|---|
| 62 | March 2 | Denver | L 114–124 | LeBron James (26) | Anthony Davis (11) | Austin Reaves (14) | Crypto.com Arena; 18,997 | 33–29 |
| 63 | March 4 | Oklahoma City | W 116–104 | D'Angelo Russell (26) | Anthony Davis (12) | LeBron James (8) | Crypto.com Arena; 18,997 | 34–29 |
| 64 | March 6 | Sacramento | L 120–130 | LeBron James (31) | Anthony Davis (11) | LeBron James (13) | Crypto.com Arena; 18,498 | 34–30 |
| 65 | March 8 | Milwaukee | W 123–122 | D'Angelo Russell (44) | Anthony Davis (13) | D'Angelo Russell (9) | Crypto.com Arena; 18,997 | 35–30 |
| 66 | March 10 | Minnesota | W 120–109 | LeBron James (29) | Anthony Davis (25) | LeBron James (9) | Crypto.com Arena; 18,997 | 36–30 |
| 67 | March 13 | @ Sacramento | L 107–120 | Austin Reaves (28) | LeBron James (13) | LeBron James (9) | Golden 1 Center; 18,332 | 36–31 |
| 68 | March 16 | Golden State | L 121–128 | LeBron James (40) | Jaxson Hayes (12) | D'Angelo Russell (13) | Crypto.com Arena; 18,997 | 36–32 |
| 69 | March 18 | Atlanta | W 136–105 | D'Angelo Russell (27) | Anthony Davis (15) | James, Russell (10) | Crypto.com Arena; 18,997 | 37–32 |
| 70 | March 22 | Philadelphia | W 101–94 | Anthony Davis (23) | Anthony Davis (19) | LeBron James (6) | Crypto.com Arena; 18,997 | 38–32 |
| 71 | March 24 | Indiana | W 150–145 | Anthony Davis (36) | Anthony Davis (16) | LeBron James (10) | Crypto.com Arena; 18,997 | 39–32 |
| 72 | March 26 | @ Milwaukee | W 128–124 (2OT) | Anthony Davis (34) | Anthony Davis (23) | D'Angelo Russell (12) | Fiserv Forum; 18,085 | 40–32 |
| 73 | March 27 | @ Memphis | W 136–124 | Rui Hachimura (32) | LeBron James (14) | LeBron James (12) | FedExForum; 17,794 | 41–32 |
| 74 | March 29 | @ Indiana | L 90–109 | Anthony Davis (24) | Anthony Davis (15) | LeBron James (8) | Gainbridge Fieldhouse; 17,274 | 41–33 |
| 75 | March 31 | @ Brooklyn | W 116–104 | LeBron James (40) | Anthony Davis (14) | Russell Reaves (6) | Barclays Center; 18,162 | 42–33 |

April: 5–2 (home: 1–2; road: 4–0)

| Game | Date | Team | Score | High points | High rebounds | High assists | Location Attendance | Record |
|---|---|---|---|---|---|---|---|---|
| 76 | April 2 | @ Toronto | W 128–111 | D'Angelo Russell (25) | Anthony Davis (12) | LeBron James (9) | Scotiabank Arena; 19,800 | 43–33 |
| 77 | April 3 | @ Washington | W 125–120 | Anthony Davis (35) | Anthony Davis (18) | LeBron James (9) | Capital One Arena; 20,333 | 44–33 |
| 78 | April 6 | Cleveland | W 116–97 | D'Angelo Russell (28) | Anthony Davis (13) | LeBron James (12) | Crypto.com Arena; 18,997 | 45–33 |
| 79 | April 7 | Minnesota | L 117–127 | Rui Hachimura (30) | Jaxson Hayes (10) | D'Angelo Russell (11) | Crypto.com Arena; 18,997 | 45–34 |
| 80 | April 9 | Golden State | L 120–134 | LeBron James (33) | Rui Hachimura (11) | LeBron James (11) | Crypto.com Arena; 18,997 | 45–35 |
| 81 | April 12 | @ Memphis | W 123–120 | LeBron James (37) | Anthony Davis (14) | D'Angelo Russell (9) | FedExForum; 17,794 | 46–35 |
| 82 | April 14 | @ New Orleans | W 124–108 | Anthony Davis (30) | James, Davis (11) | LeBron James (17) | Smoothie King Center; 18,633 | 47–35 |

2023–24 season schedule

=== Play-in ===
2024 play-in game log
Total: 1–0 (home: 0–0; road: 1–0)
Play-in: 1–0 (home: 0–0; road: 1–0)

| Game | Date | Team | Score | High points | High rebounds | High assists | Location Attendance | Record |
|---|---|---|---|---|---|---|---|---|
| 1 | April 16 | @ New Orleans | W 110–106 | LeBron James (23) | Anthony Davis (15) | LeBron James (9) | Smoothie King Center; 18,591 | 1–0 |

2023–24 season schedule

=== Playoffs ===
2024 playoff game log
Total: 1–4 (home: 1–1; road: 0–3)
First round: 1–4 (home: 1–1; road: 0–3)

| Game | Date | Team | Score | High points | High rebounds | High assists | Location Attendance | Series |
|---|---|---|---|---|---|---|---|---|
| 1 | April 20 | @ Denver | L 103–114 | Anthony Davis (32) | Anthony Davis (14) | LeBron James (8) | Ball Arena; 19,731 | 0–1 |
| 2 | April 22 | @ Denver | L 99–101 | Anthony Davis (32) | Anthony Davis (11) | LeBron James (12) | Ball Arena; 19,711 | 0–2 |
| 3 | April 25 | Denver | L 105–112 | Anthony Davis (33) | Anthony Davis (15) | LeBron James (9) | Crypto.com Arena; 18,997 | 0–3 |
| 4 | April 27 | Denver | W 119–108 | LeBron James (30) | Anthony Davis (23) | Davis, Reaves (6) | Crypto.com Arena; 18,997 | 1–3 |
| 5 | April 29 | @ Denver | L 106–108 | LeBron James (30) | Anthony Davis (15) | LeBron James (11) | Ball Arena; 19,861 | 1–4 |

2024 playoff schedule

=== In-Season Tournament ===
During the inaugural NBA In-Season Tournament, the Lakers defeated the Phoenix Suns 122–119. Later, the Lakers defeated the Memphis Grizzlies, the Portland Trail Blazers, and the Utah Jazz, with each of those victories being won by at least 12 points. The team advanced into the knockout tournament rounds of the in-season tournament with the best point differential of the entire event with a +74 in the Western Conference. They then entered the proper tournament with a rematch against the Suns at home before going to Las Vegas, Nevada's T-Mobile Arena for a semifinals match against the New Orleans Pelicans and a championship match against the Indiana Pacers.

Overall, the team held a perfect 7–0 record in the tournament. On December 9, the team won the inaugural NBA Cup, defeating the Indiana Pacers.

==== West group A ====
| Pos | Team | Pld | W | L | PF | PA | PD | Qualification | LAL | PHX | UTA | POR | MEM |
|---|---|---|---|---|---|---|---|---|---|---|---|---|---|
| 1 | Los Angeles Lakers | 4 | 4 | 0 | 494 | 420 | +74 | Advance to knockout stage | — | 122–119 | 131–99 | 107–95 | 134–107 |
| 2 | Phoenix Suns | 4 | 3 | 1 | 480 | 446 | +34 | Advance to knockout stage | 119–122 | — | 131–128 | 120–107 | 110–89 |
| 3 | Utah Jazz | 4 | 2 | 2 | 469 | 482 | −13 | | 99–131 | 128–131 | — | 115–99 | 127–121 |
| 4 | Portland Trail Blazers | 4 | 1 | 3 | 416 | 455 | −39 | | 95–107 | 107–120 | 99–115 | — | 115–113 (OT) |
| 5 | Memphis Grizzlies | 4 | 0 | 4 | 430 | 486 | −56 | | 107–134 | 89–110 | 121–127 | 113–115 (OT) | — |

Source: NBA
Rules for classification: Tiebreakers

2023–24 game log
Total: 7–0 (Home: 5–0; Road: 2–0)
In-Season Tournament: 7–0 (home: 5–0; road: 2–0)

| Game | Date | Team | Score | High points | High rebounds | High assists | Location Attendance | Record |
|---|---|---|---|---|---|---|---|---|
| 1 | November 10 | @ Phoenix | W 122–119 | LeBron James (32) | Davis, James (11) | D'Angelo Russell (9) | Footprint Center; 17,071 | 1–0 |
| 2 | November 14 | Memphis | W 134–107 | D'Angelo Russell (24) | Austin Reaves (12) | Austin Reaves (7) | Crypto.com Arena; 18,430 | 2–0 |
| 3 | November 17 | @ Portland | W 107–95 | LeBron James (35) | Anthony Davis (14) | LeBron James (9) | Moda Center; 18,570 | 3–0 |
| 4 | November 21 | Utah | W 131–99 | Anthony Davis (26) | Anthony Davis (16) | LeBron James (9) | Crypto.com Arena; 18,997 | 4–0 |
| 5 | December 5 | Phoenix | W 106–103 | LeBron James (31) | Anthony Davis (15) | LeBron James (11) | Crypto.com Arena; 18,664 | 5–0 |
| 6 | December 7 | New Orleans | W 133–89 | LeBron James (30) | Anthony Davis (15) | LeBron James (8) | T-Mobile Arena; 18,017 | 6–0 |
| 7 | December 9 | Indiana | W 123–109 | Anthony Davis (41) | Anthony Davis (20) | D'Angelo Russell (7) | T-Mobile Arena; 19,021 | 7–0 |

2023–24 season schedule

== Player statistics ==
Legend
| GP | Games played | GS | Games started | MPG | Minutes per game |
| FG% | Field-goal percentage | 3P% | 3-point field-goal percentage | FT% | Free-throw percentage |
| RPG | Rebounds per game | APG | Assists per game | SPG | Steals per game |
| BPG | Blocks per game | PPG | Points per game |

=== Regular season ===
Los Angeles Lakers statistics
| Player | GP | GS | MPG | FG% | 3P% | FT% | RPG | APG | SPG | BPG | PPG |
|---|---|---|---|---|---|---|---|---|---|---|---|
| Colin Castleton | 16 | 0 | 3.7 | .563 | | 1.000 | .8 | .2 | .1 | .0 | 1.5 |
| Max Christie | 67 | 7 | 14.1 | .427 | .356 | .783 | 2.1 | .9 | .3 | .3 | 4.2 |
| Anthony Davis | 76 | 76 | 35.5 | .556 | .271 | .816 | 12.6 | 3.5 | 1.2 | 2.3 | 24.7 |
| Spencer Dinwiddie^{†} | 28 | 4 | 24.2 | .397 | .389 | .880 | 1.7 | 2.4 | .5 | .5 | 6.8 |
| Alex Fudge^{†} | 4 | 0 | 3.5 | .167 | .000 | 1.000 | .5 | .0 | .0 | .0 | 1.0 |
| Harry Giles III^{†} | 7 | 0 | 2.7 | .167 | .000 | | .6 | .0 | .1 | .0 | .3 |
| Rui Hachimura | 68 | 39 | 26.9 | .537 | .422 | .739 | 4.3 | 1.2 | .6 | .4 | 13.6 |
| Jaxson Hayes | 70 | 5 | 12.5 | .720 | .000 | .622 | 3.0 | .5 | .5 | .4 | 4.3 |
| D'Moi Hodge | 7 | 0 | 5.9 | .333 | .250 | .500 | .0 | .7 | .1 | .1 | 2.0 |
| Jalen Hood-Schifino | 21 | 0 | 5.2 | .222 | .133 | .600 | .6 | .4 | .1 | .1 | 1.6 |
| LeBron James | 71 | 71 | 35.3 | .540 | .410 | .750 | 7.3 | 8.3 | 1.3 | .5 | 25.7 |
| Maxwell Lewis | 34 | 0 | 3.0 | .190 | .111 | .667 | .1 | .2 | .1 | .0 | .3 |
| Skylar Mays^{†} | 17 | 0 | 4.5 | .476 | .400 | | .4 | .6 | .4 | .1 | 1.3 |
| Taurean Prince | 78 | 49 | 27.0 | .442 | .396 | .735 | 2.9 | 1.5 | .7 | .4 | 8.9 |
| Austin Reaves | 82 | 57 | 32.1 | .486 | .367 | .853 | 4.3 | 5.5 | .8 | .3 | 15.9 |
| Cam Reddish | 48 | 26 | 20.5 | .389 | .336 | .759 | 2.1 | 1.0 | 1.0 | .3 | 5.4 |
| D'Angelo Russell | 76 | 69 | 32.7 | .456 | .415 | .828 | 3.1 | 6.3 | .9 | .5 | 18.0 |
| Jarred Vanderbilt | 29 | 6 | 20.0 | .518 | .296 | .667 | 4.8 | 1.2 | 1.2 | .2 | 5.2 |
| Gabe Vincent | 11 | 0 | 19.8 | .306 | .107 | .500 | .8 | 1.9 | .8 | .0 | 3.1 |
| Dylan Windler^{†} | 8 | 0 | 3.5 | .444 | .500 | | .4 | .8 | .0 | .0 | 1.5 |
| Christian Wood | 50 | 1 | 17.4 | .466 | .307 | .702 | 5.1 | 1.0 | .3 | .7 | 6.9 |

=== Playoffs ===
Los Angeles Lakers statistics
| Player | GP | GS | MPG | FG% | 3P% | FT% | RPG | APG | SPG | BPG | PPG |
|---|---|---|---|---|---|---|---|---|---|---|---|
| Anthony Davis | 5 | 5 | 41.6 | .634 | .000 | .808 | 15.6 | 4.0 | .4 | 1.6 | 27.8 |
| Spencer Dinwiddie | 5 | 0 | 14.6 | .357 | .250 | .500 | 1.4 | 1.6 | .4 | .2 | 3.0 |
| Rui Hachimura | 5 | 5 | 30.4 | .395 | .357 | .500 | 3.8 | .8 | .0 | .0 | 7.8 |
| Jaxson Hayes | 4 | 0 | 6.0 | .000 | | .500 | 3.0 | .3 | .0 | .0 | .3 |
| LeBron James | 5 | 5 | 40.8 | .566 | .385 | .739 | 6.8 | 8.8 | 2.4 | 1.0 | 27.8 |
| Taurean Prince | 5 | 0 | 22.2 | .414 | .294 | 1.000 | 2.4 | .6 | .2 | .4 | 7.4 |
| Austin Reaves | 5 | 5 | 34.8 | .476 | .269 | .895 | 3.8 | 3.6 | 1.4 | .6 | 16.8 |
| D'Angelo Russell | 5 | 5 | 37.0 | .384 | .318 | .500 | 2.8 | 4.2 | .8 | .2 | 14.2 |
| Gabe Vincent | 5 | 0 | 13.8 | .250 | .143 | | 1.6 | .6 | .4 | .0 | 1.4 |

- ^{†} Denotes player spent time with another team in the season. Stats reflect time with the Lakers only.

== Transactions ==
=== Free agency ===
==== Re-signed ====
| Date | Player | Contract terms | Ref. |
|---|---|---|---|
| July 1, 2023 | Rui Hachimura | 3 years $51M | |
| July 1, 2023 | Austin Reaves | 4 years $56M | |
| July 1, 2023 | D'Angelo Russell | 2 years $37M | |
| September 18, 2023 | Jarred Vanderbilt | 4 years $48M | |

==== Additions ====
| Date | Player | Contract terms | Former team | Ref. |
|---|---|---|---|---|
| July 1, 2023 | Gabe Vincent | 3 years $33M | Miami Heat | |
| July 1, 2023 | Taurean Prince | 1 year $4.5M | Minnesota Timberwolves | |
| July 1, 2023 | Cam Reddish | 2 years $4.6M | Portland Trail Blazers | |
| July 1, 2023 | Jaxson Hayes | 2 years $4.6M | New Orleans Pelicans | |
| July 3, 2023 | Colin Castleton | Two-way contract | Florida Gators | |
| September 5, 2023 | Christian Wood | 2 years $5.7M | Dallas Mavericks | |
| January 6, 2024 | Dylan Windler | Two-way contract | Westchester Knicks | |
| January 8, 2024 | Skylar Mays | Two-way contract | Portland Trail Blazers | |
| February 10, 2024 | Spencer Dinwiddie | 1 year $2.0M | Brooklyn Nets | |
| March 2, 2024 | Harry Giles III | Two-way contract | Brooklyn Nets | |

==== Subtractions ====
| Date | Player | Reason | New team | Ref. |
|---|---|---|---|---|
| June 29, 2023 | Mo Bamba | Waived | Philadelphia 76ers | |
| June 29, 2023 | Shaquille Harrison | Waived | Memphis Grizzlies | |
| June 30, 2023 | Dennis Schröder | 2 years $26M | Toronto Raptors | |
| July 3, 2023 | Malik Beasley | 1 year $2.7M | Milwaukee Bucks | |
| July 8, 2023 | Troy Brown Jr. | 2 years $8M | Minnesota Timberwolves | |
| July 10, 2023 | Lonnie Walker IV | 1 year $2.3M | Brooklyn Nets | |
| September 12, 2023 | Tristan Thompson | 1 year $3.2M | Cleveland Cavaliers | |
| October 4, 2023 | Wenyen Gabriel | 1 year | Boston Celtics | |
| January 6, 2024 | Alex Fudge | Waived | South Bay Lakers | |
| January 6, 2024 | D'Moi Hodge | Waived | Rip City Remix | |
| March 2, 2024 | Dylan Windler | Waived | College Park Skyhawks | |
