= Jordan Miller (basketball) =

American basketball player (born 2000)

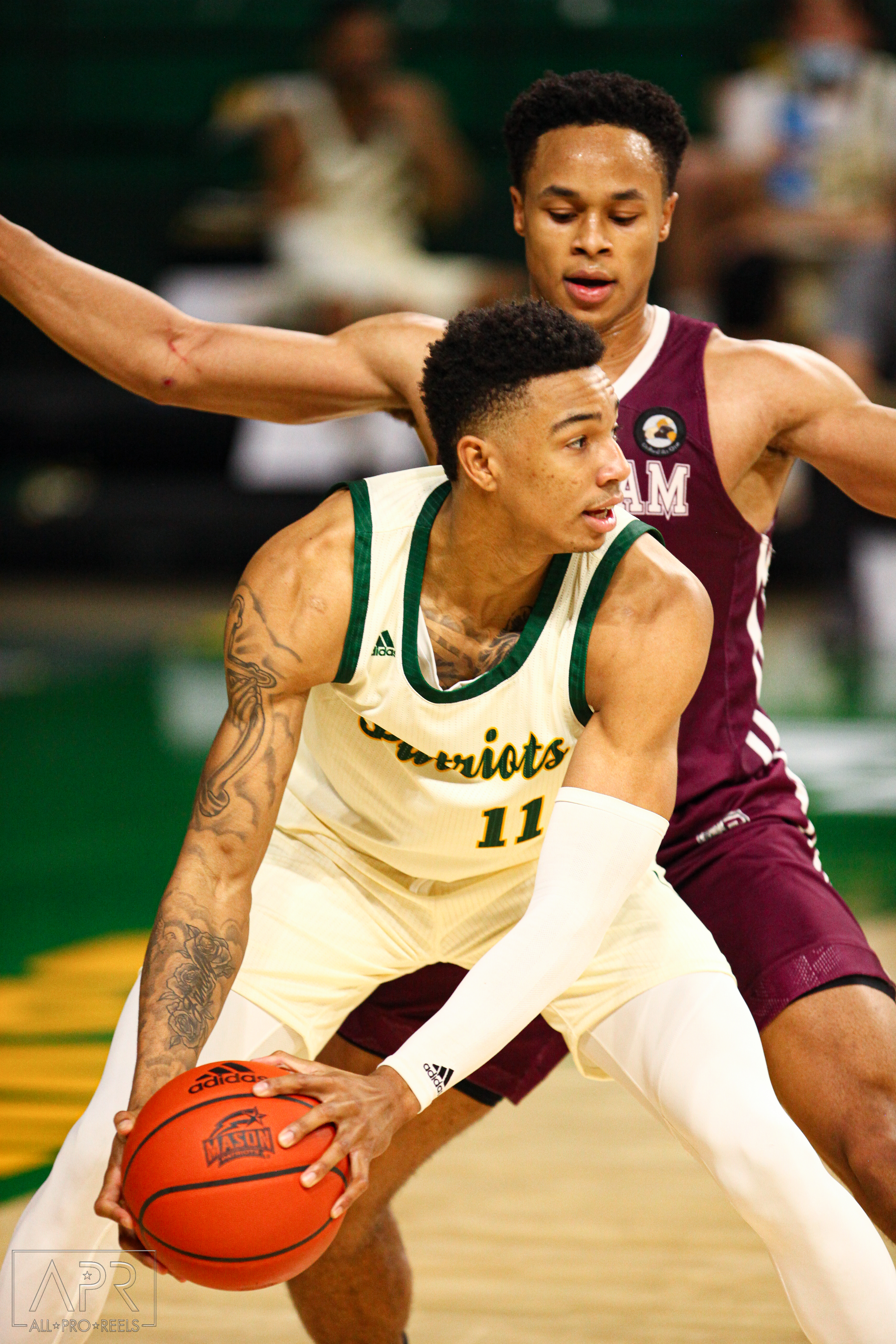
- Miller with George Mason in 2021

No. 22 – Los Angeles Clippers
- Position: Small forward / shooting guard
- League: NBA

Personal information
- Born: January 23, 2000 (age 26) Anaheim, California, U.S.
- Listed height: 6 ft 5 in (1.96 m)
- Listed weight: 194 lb (88 kg)

Career information
- High school: Loudoun Valley (Purcellville, Virginia)
- College: George Mason (2018–2021); Miami (Florida) (2021–2023)
- NBA draft: 2023: 2nd round, 48th overall pick
- Drafted by: Los Angeles Clippers
- Playing career: 2023–present

Career history
- 2023–present: Los Angeles Clippers
- 2023–2026: →Ontario / San Diego Clippers

Career highlights
- NBA G League All-Rookie Team (2024); Second-team All-ACC (2023); Third-team All-Atlantic 10 (2021)
- Stats at NBA.com
- Stats at Basketball Reference

Jordan Tyler Miller (born January 23, 2000) is an American professional basketball player for the Los Angeles Clippers of the National Basketball Association (NBA). He played college basketball for the George Mason Patriots and Miami Hurricanes.

== Early life and high school ==
Miller grew up in Middleburg, Virginia and attended Loudoun Valley High School. He was named the Virginia High School League's Class AAAA Player of the Year as a junior after leading the team to the state championship and a 30–1 overall record.

== College career ==
Miller began his college career at George Mason. He initially intended to redshirt his freshman season, but became a starter for the second half of the Patriots' season following a number of injuries on the team and averaged 10.4 points in 17 games played. Miller averaged 12.7 points and 5.3 rebounds per game during his sophomore season. He averaged 15.8 points per game and was named third-team All-Atlantic 10 Conference as a junior. Following the end of the season, Miller entered the NCAA transfer portal.

Miller ultimately transferred to Miami (FL). He averaged 10.0 points, 5.9 rebounds, 1.1 assists and 1.8 steals per game in his first season with the Hurricanes. After the season, Miller decided to utilize the extra year of eligibility granted to college athletes who played in the 2020 season due to the coronavirus pandemic and return to Miami for a second season. Miller was named second-team All-Atlantic Coast Conference as a fifth-year senior after averaging 15.3 points, 6.2 rebounds, 2.7 assists and 1.2 steals per game in 37 starts. In the Hurricanes' Elite Eight game in the 2023 NCAA tournament against Texas, he made seven of seven field goal attempts and made all 13 free throw attempts as Miami won 88–81 win. It was only the second "perfect game" with at least seven field goal attempts in NCAA tournament history after Christian Laettner had done so in 1992. At the end of the season, Miller declared for the 2023 NBA draft.

== Professional career ==
Miller was selected by the Los Angeles Clippers in second round of the 2023 NBA draft with the 48th overall pick. On August 7, 2023, he signed with the Clippers.

On March 1, 2025, the Clippers guard Miller agreed to a four-year, $8.3 million contract. The 2023 second-rounder had starred for the Clippers' G League team and acquired a standard deal, which included over $1 million for last 6 weeks of season. He made 37 total appearances for Los Angeles during the 2024–25 NBA season, averaging 4.1 points, 1.6 rebounds, and 0.9 assists. On July 8, Miller was waived by the Clippers.

On July 28, 2025, Miller re-signed with Los Angeles on a two-way contract, however on February 18, 2026, his two-way deal was converted to a standard two-year contract. Miller made 60 total appearances (including one start) for the Clippers during the 2025–26 season, recording averages of 10.0 points, 3.0 rebounds, and 2.3 assists.

On July 3, 2026, Miller re-signed with Los Angeles on a three-year, $15.3 million contract. On August 26, Miller was ruled out for at least six months after undergoing surgery to repair a torn rotator cuff in his left shoulder.

== Career statistics ==
Legend
| GP | Games played | GS | Games started | MPG | Minutes per game |
| FG% | Field goal percentage | 3P% | 3-point field goal percentage | FT% | Free throw percentage |
| RPG | Rebounds per game | APG | Assists per game | SPG | Steals per game |
| BPG | Blocks per game | PPG | Points per game | **Bold** | Career high |

=== NBA ===
==== Regular season ====
| Year | Team | GP | GS | MPG | FG% | 3P% | FT% | RPG | APG | SPG | BPG | PPG |
|---|---|---|---|---|---|---|---|---|---|---|---|---|
| 2023–24 | L.A. Clippers | 8 | 0 | 3.5 | **.556** | **.500** | **1.000** | .6 | .0 | .0 | .0 | 1.6 |
| 2024–25 | L.A. Clippers | 37 | 0 | 11.4 | .433 | .211 | .800 | 1.6 | .9 | .5 | .1 | 4.1 |
| 2025–26 | L.A. Clippers | **60** | **1** | **22.1** | .531 | .345 | .777 | **3.0** | **2.3** | **.8** | **.2** | **10.0** |
| Career | | 105 | 1 | 16.9 | .507 | .313 | .783 | 2.3 | 1.6 | .6 | .2 | 7.3 |

==== Playoffs ====
| Year | Team | GP | GS | MPG | FG% | 3P% | FT% | RPG | APG | SPG | BPG | PPG |
|---|---|---|---|---|---|---|---|---|---|---|---|---|
| 2025 | L.A. Clippers | 3 | 0 | 4.3 | .429 | .000 | .500 | .7 | 1.3 | 1.0 | .0 | 2.3 |
| Career | | 3 | 0 | 4.3 | .429 | .000 | .500 | .7 | 1.3 | 1.0 | .0 | 2.3 |

== See also ==
- List of All-Atlantic Coast Conference men's basketball teams
