= Max Christie =

American basketball player (born 2003)

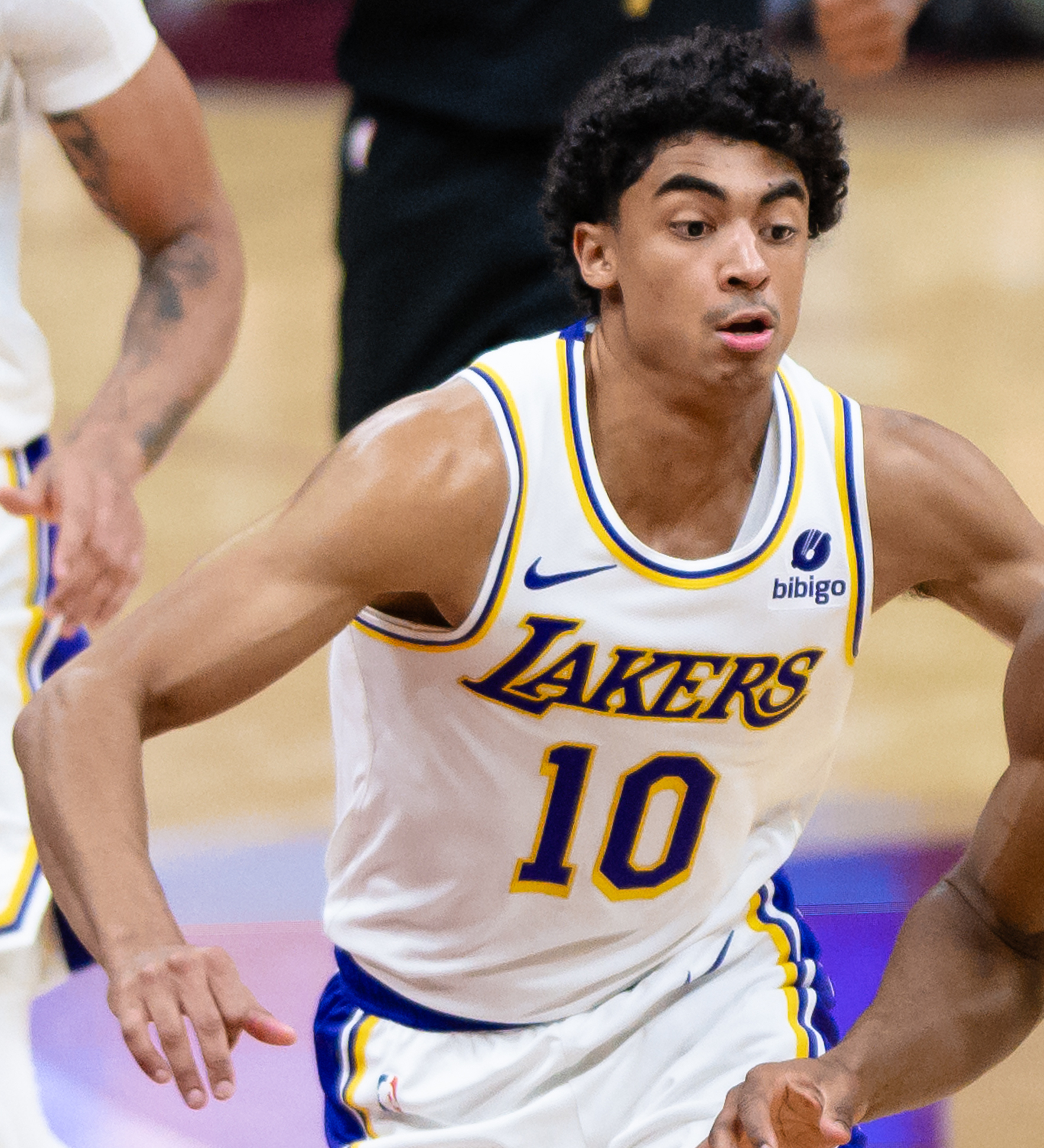
- Christie with the Los Angeles Lakers in 2023

No. 0 – Dallas Mavericks
- Position: Shooting guard
- League: NBA

Personal information
- Born: February 10, 2003 (age 23) Arlington Heights, Illinois, U.S.
- Listed height: 6 ft 5 in (1.96 m)
- Listed weight: 190 lb (86 kg)

Career information
- High school: Rolling Meadows (Rolling Meadows, Illinois)
- College: Michigan State (2021–2022)
- NBA draft: 2022: 2nd round, 35th overall pick
- Drafted by: Los Angeles Lakers
- Playing career: 2022–present

Career history
- 2022–2025: Los Angeles Lakers
- 2022–2023: →South Bay Lakers
- 2025–present: Dallas Mavericks

Career highlights
- NBA Cup champion (2023); Big Ten All-Freshman Team (2022); McDonald's All-American (2021); Nike Hoop Summit (2021)
- Stats at NBA.com
- Stats at Basketball Reference
Medals
Men's basketball
Representing the United States
FIBA Americas U16 Championship
Gold medal – first place	2019 Brazil	Team

Cormac Karl "Max" Christie Jr. (born February 10, 2003) is an American professional basketball player for the Dallas Mavericks of the National Basketball Association (NBA). He played college basketball for the Michigan State Spartans. He was a consensus five-star recruit and one of the top players in the 2021 class.

== High school career ==
Christie played basketball for Rolling Meadows High School in Rolling Meadows, Illinois, and was teammates with his younger brother, Cameron. In his freshman season, he averaged 20 points, nine rebounds and four assists per game. As a sophomore, Christie averaged 25.5 points, 10 rebounds and 3.2 assists per game. He scored a career-high 51 points against Elk Grove High School. In his junior season, Christie averaged 25 points and 11 rebounds per game, earning Pioneer Press Player of the Year honors. As a senior, he averaged 24 points, 10.1 rebounds, 3.9 assists and 3.1 steals per game, leading his team to a 15–0 record. Christie was selected as Chicago Sun-Times Player of the Year, News-Gazette All-State Player of the Year and Illinois Gatorade Player of the Year. He was named to the rosters for the McDonald's All-American Game, Jordan Brand Classic and Nike Hoop Summit.

=== Recruiting ===
Christie was a consensus five-star recruit and one of the top players in the 2021 class, according to major recruiting services. On July 7, 2020, he committed to playing college basketball for Michigan State over offers from Duke, Villanova and Ohio State, among others.

College recruiting
Name	Hometown	School	Height	Weight	Commit date
Max Christie; SG	Arlington Heights, IL	Rolling Meadows (IL)	6 ft 7 in (2.01 m)	185 lb (84 kg)	Jul 7, 2020
Max Christie; SG	Recruit ratings: Rivals: 247Sports: ESPN: (92)				
Overall recruit ranking: Rivals: 20 247Sports: 21 ESPN: 18
Note: In many cases, Scout, Rivals, 247Sports, On3, and ESPN may conflict in their listings of height and weight.; In these cases, the average was taken. ESPN grades are on a 100-point scale.; Sources: "Michigan State 2021 Basketball Commits". Rivals.; "2021 Michigan State Spartans Recruiting Class". ESPN.; "2021 Team Ranking". Rivals.

== College career ==
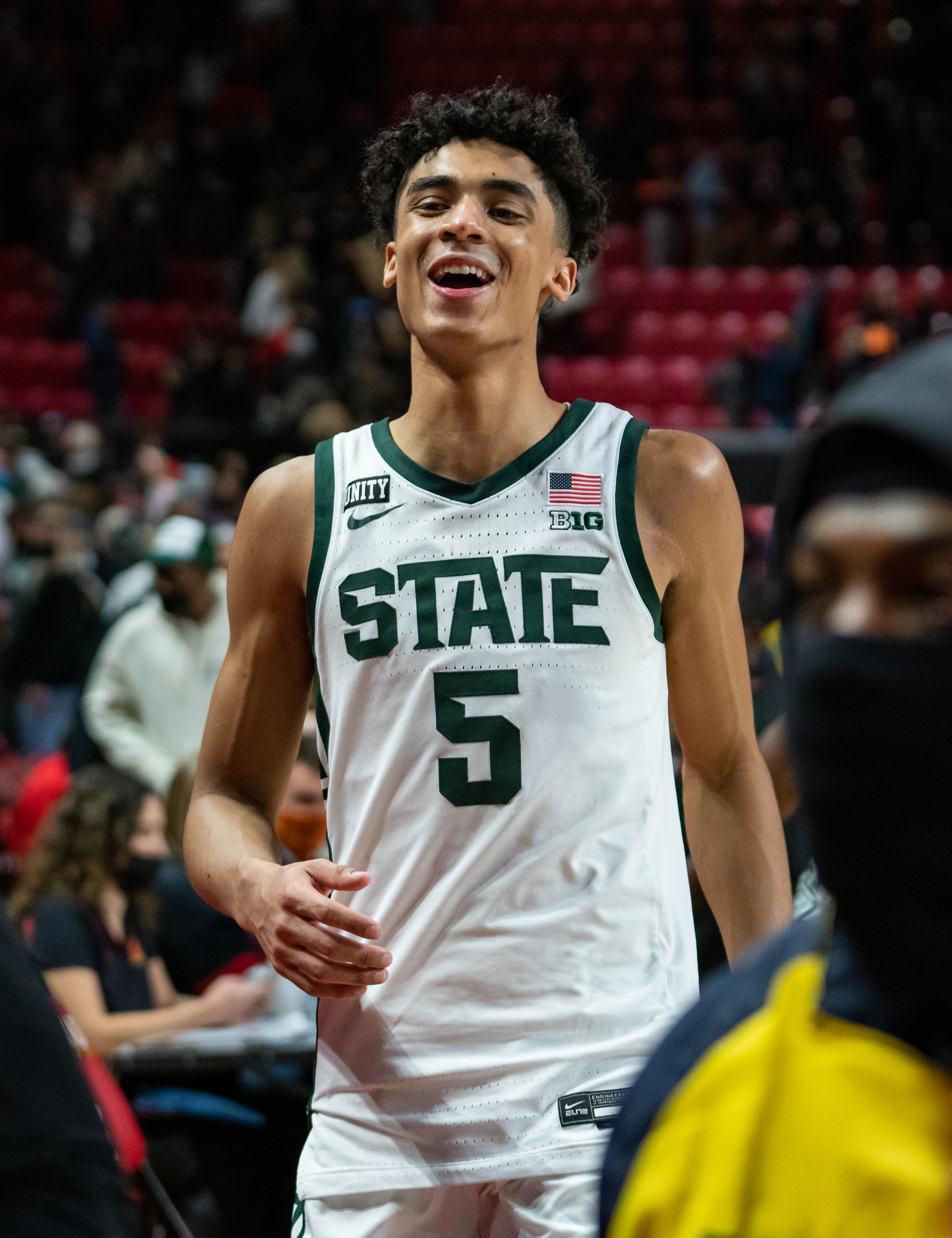
Maryland vs. Michigan State Men's Basketball 2022 Blackout

On January 5, 2022, Christie scored a season-high 21 points in a 79–67 win against Nebraska. As a freshman, he averaged 9.3 points and 3.5 rebounds per game and was named to the Big Ten All-Freshman Team. On April 1, 2022, Christie declared for the 2022 NBA draft while maintaining his college eligibility and on May 16 announced he would hire an agent and remain in the draft.

== Professional career ==
=== 2022–23 ===
Christie was selected by the Los Angeles Lakers in the second round of the 2022 NBA draft with the 35th overall pick. Christie joined the Lakers' 2022 NBA Summer League roster. In his Summer League debut, Christie scored five points and nine rebounds in a 100–66 California Classic win against the Miami Heat. On July 8, 2022, Christie signed his rookie scale contract with the Lakers. During his rookie season, he scored a season-high 14 points on 6 of 8 shooting and 2-of-3 made Three-point field goals on January 10 in a 122–109 loss to the Denver Nuggets. He was assigned to the South Bay Lakers of the NBA G League on March 8, 2023. He was recalled by the Los Angeles Lakers from South Bay two days later. For the season, he averaged 3.1 points, 1.8 rebounds, and 1 assist a game on 41.5% 2s and 41.9% shooting on 1.5 threes per game. During the playoffs, in 3.7 minutes per game, he scored 1.4 points per game on 25% shooting from the three-point line and 50% shooting from two.

=== 2023–24 ===
On December 9, 2023, Christie and the Lakers won the inaugural season of the NBA In-Season Tournament. Max tied his career high with 14 points twice during the 2023–24 season, first against the Miami Heat during a 110–96 loss on January 3, and secondly against the Phoenix Suns eight days later during a 127–109 loss. For the season, his minutes went up to 14.1 from the previous season but his three-point percentage dipped on slightly more attempts while most of his numbers remained steady.

=== 2024–25 ===
Christie re-signed with the Lakers on a four-year, $32 million deal on July 2, 2024. When the Lakers hired head coach JJ Redick in the summer of 2024, the two got together to work out in Las Vegas ahead of the start of the 2024–25 season. When the season started, he shot only 25% in October and 31% in November on three-point shots. However, after becoming a starter, he shot over 45% on threes over the next eight games while averaging 10.6 point a game over that stretch. Over the subsequent 17 games, he continued to shoot the three-point shot well, making nearly 41% from the three-point line and averaging 10.9 points per game. Overall for the Lakers in the 2024–25 season, Christie shot 37% on three-pointers during 25 minutes a game – nearly double that of the previous season, while averaging 8.5 points per game. Throughout the season, he earned high praise for his defense from Lakers' stars such as LeBron James Anthony Davis, Austin Reaves, as well as coach Redick. During the first 2 1/2 months of the season, he increased his career-high in points for a game three times, with 15 on December 13 against the Minnesota Timberwolves, 17 against the Detroit Pistons 10 days later, and then with 28 against the Portland Trail Blazers on January 2, 2025.

=== 2024–25 season ===
On February 2, 2025, Christie was traded alongside Anthony Davis and a 2029 first-round pick to the Dallas Mavericks in exchange for Luka Dončić, Maxi Kleber and Markieff Morris. The Mavericks additionally traded a 2025 second-round pick to the Utah Jazz, who also acquired Jalen Hood-Schifino and a 2025 second-round pick from the Lakers. Over the remainder of the 2024–25 season he increased his scoring to 11.2 points per game while shooting 36.4% on threes and playing 30 minutes a game. His highest scoring game for the Mavericks in 2025 was 23.

=== 2025–26 season ===
Christie averaged 12.8 points a game over the first 20 games of the season while shooting 47% from three-point shots and playing in every game. Between January 18 and 25, Christie had four straight 20 point scoring games, including a game against the New York Knicks in which he made a career-high eight three-pointers.

== National team career ==
Christie represented the United States at the 2019 FIBA Under-16 Americas Championship in Brazil. He averaged 9.5 points and 3.3 rebounds per game, helping his team win the gold medal.

== Career statistics ==
Legend
GP	Games played	GS	Games started	MPG	Minutes per game
FG%	Field goal percentage	3P%	3-point field goal percentage	FT%	Free throw percentage
RPG	Rebounds per game	APG	Assists per game	SPG	Steals per game
BPG	Blocks per game	PPG	Points per game	**Bold**	Career high

=== NBA ===
==== Regular season ====
Year	Team	GP	GS	MPG	FG%	3P%	FT%	RPG	APG	SPG	BPG	PPG
2022–23	L.A. Lakers	41	3	12.5	.415	**.419**	.875	1.8	.5	.2	.2	3.1
2023–24	L.A. Lakers	67	7	14.1	.427	.356	.783	2.1	.9	.3	.3	4.2
2024–25	L.A. Lakers	46	25	25.1	**.444**	.368	.851	2.7	1.4	.8	**.5**	8.5
2024–25	Dallas	32	11	**30.4**	.411	.364	.862	**4.2**	**2.5**	**.9**	.3	11.2
2025–26	Dallas	**77**	**68**	29.1	.441	.404	**.899**	3.2	2.0	.6	.4	**12.3**
Career		263	114	22.2	.433	.386	.864	2.8	1.4	.5	.3	8.0

==== Playoffs ====
Year	Team	GP	GS	MPG	FG%	3P%	FT%	RPG	APG	SPG	BPG	PPG
2023	L.A. Lakers	9	0	3.7	.500	.250	.500	.8	.3	.0	.1	1.4
Career		9	0	3.7	.500	.250	.500	.8	.3	.0	.1	1.4

=== College ===
Year	Team	GP	GS	MPG	FG%	3P%	FT%	RPG	APG	SPG	BPG	PPG
2021–22	Michigan State	35	35	30.8	.382	.317	.824	3.5	1.5	.5	.5	9.3

== Personal life ==
Christie's mother, Katrina (née Hannaford), played college basketball at Northwestern, scoring over 1,000 points, and is a psychotherapist. His father, Max Sr., played college basketball at Parkland College and Wisconsin–Superior before becoming an airline pilot. His younger brother, Cam Christie, was a collegiate basketball player at Minnesota, and was selected with the 46th overall pick by the Los Angeles Clippers in the 2024 NBA draft. Christie is a fan of Japanese manga and anime.
