= Norman Powell =

American and Jamaican basketball player (born 1993)

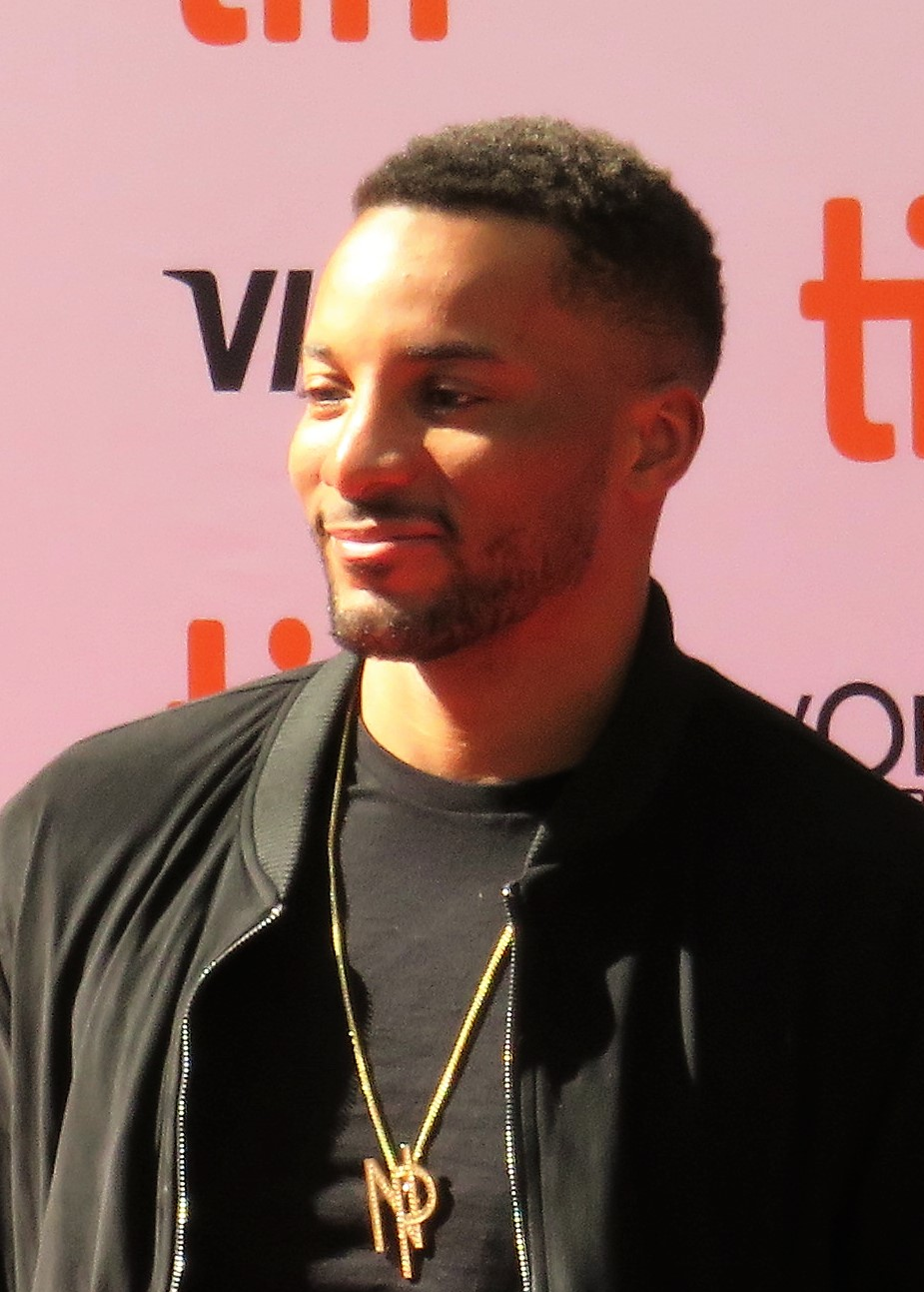
- Powell in 2017

No. 24 – Chicago Bulls
- Position: Shooting guard / Small Forward
- League: NBA

Personal information
- Born: May 25, 1993 (age 33) San Diego, California, U.S.
- Listed height: 6 ft 3 in (1.91 m)
- Listed weight: 215 lb (98 kg)

Career information
- High school: Lincoln (San Diego, California)
- College: UCLA (2011–2015)
- NBA draft: 2015: 2nd round, 46th overall pick
- Drafted by: Milwaukee Bucks
- Playing career: 2015–present

Career history
- 2015–2021: Toronto Raptors
- 2015–2016: →Raptors 905
- 2021–2022: Portland Trail Blazers
- 2022–2025: Los Angeles Clippers
- 2025–2026: Miami Heat
- 2026–present: Chicago Bulls

Career highlights
- NBA champion (2019); NBA All-Star (2026); First-team All-Pac-12 (2015)
- Stats at NBA.com
- Stats at Basketball Reference

Norman WC Powell (born May 25, 1993) is an American and Jamaican professional basketball player for the Chicago Bulls of the National Basketball Association (NBA). Powell played college basketball with the UCLA Bruins, where he was an all-conference player in the Pac-12. He was selected in the second round of the 2015 NBA draft by the Milwaukee Bucks, who subsequently traded his draft rights to the Toronto Raptors. He won an NBA championship with Toronto in 2019. In 2026, he was named an NBA All-Star in his only season with the Miami Heat.

Powell was a two-time all-state high school player in California and led his team to a state championship before joining UCLA. After entering his senior year in 2014–15 as the Bruins' top returning player, he emerged as a team leader and received first-team All-Pac-12 honors.

== Early years ==
Powell was born and raised in San Diego, California, to Sharon and Norman Powell Sr. He was introduced to basketball by his uncle, Raymond Edwards. Powell decided to attend Lincoln High School, which had just been rebuilt and lost many athletes. He helped rebuild their basketball program, leading the team to consecutive California Interscholastic Federation (CIF) San Diego Section 2A championships in 2009 and 2010. The team also captured the 2010 CIF Division II Boys' State Championship, with Powell scoring 24 points in a 74–59 win over Mountain View St. Francis. He finished his junior season averaging 19.7 points, 4.9 rebounds, and 2.7 steals, and earned first-team all-state as well as Western League Most Valuable Player (MVP) honors.

In his senior year, he was again first-team all-state and league MVP, and averaged 20.4 points, 3.8 rebounds, 2.4 steals. Lincoln was 32–2 and won the league title with a 12–0 record. They were ranked No. 3 in California and No. 15 nationally, but were defeated 74–69 by Summit in the state semifinals. He finished his high school career winning the San Diego County All Star Game Dunk Contest.

Considered a four-star recruit by ESPN.com, Powell was listed as the No. 15 shooting guard and the No. 52 player in the nation in 2011. Powell chose to play college basketball for UCLA over San Diego State, Arizona and Oregon.

== College career ==
In his first year at the University of California, Los Angeles (UCLA), he was the only true freshman to play significant minutes in 2011–12, when he averaged 17.8 minutes and contributed 4.6 points and 2.2 rebounds in 33 games, joining Tyler Lamb and Lazeric Jones as the only Bruins to play in every game that season. While he excelled as a driving guard in high school, his role transformed at UCLA, taking less than one-fourth of his shots around the rim and close to half from outside on three-point attempts, connecting on 38.5% over the last 18 games.

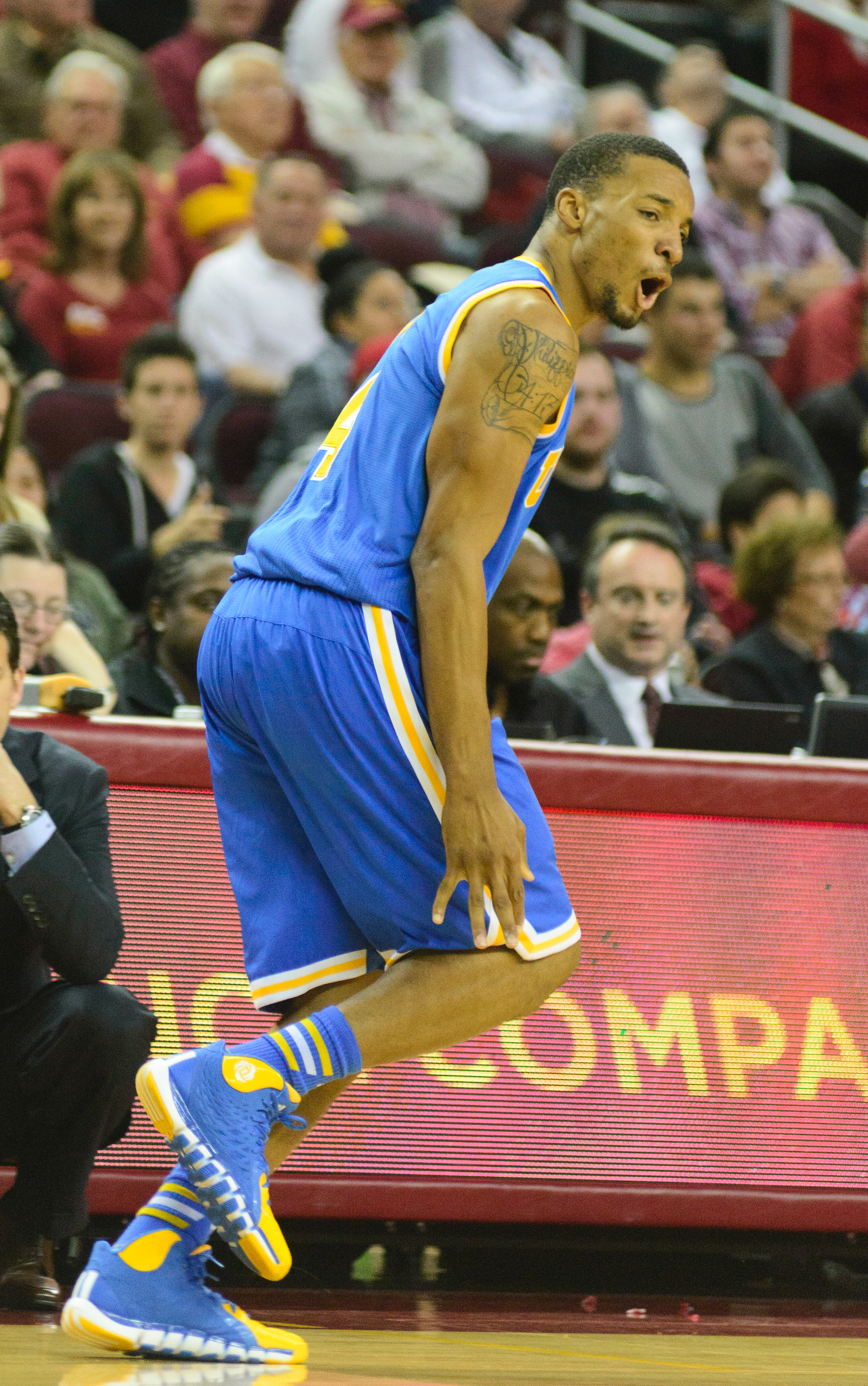
Powell as a junior in 2014

Powell averaged 6.1 points in 22.1 minutes in 2012–13, making nine starts while playing all 35 games. He began the season as a starter, but was later moved to the bench. His minutes declined from an average of 28.4 in the first seven games to 19 the following 26 games. After replacing injured starter Jordan Adams, Powell's minutes increased to 37 per game. He considered transferring to San Diego State after the season, but decided to stay primarily because UCLA coach Ben Howland was fired. Powell credited Howland for his development on defense, but he stated that "there were a lot of things going on that weren't fair for me" and "I definitely wanted to see a change." The Bruins hired Steve Alford as their new coach.

In 2013–14, Powell started all 37 games and was third on the team in scoring (11.4). Under Alford, he became an offensive threat and a staunch defender. He was more aggressive taking the ball to the basket, and dunked more than he could in Howland's system. The team's best on-ball defender, Powell was routinely assigned the opponent's best offensive player and earned honorable mention for the Pac-12 Conference All-Defensive Team. UCLA opened the 2014 NCAA tournament in San Diego, enabling him to play in his hometown for the first time since high school. UCLA advanced to the Sweet 16, and Powell averaged 13.0 points and 2.7 rebounds in three tournament contests. After the season, he considered playing professionally in the NBA, and requested an evaluation of his prospects for the upcoming 2014 NBA draft.

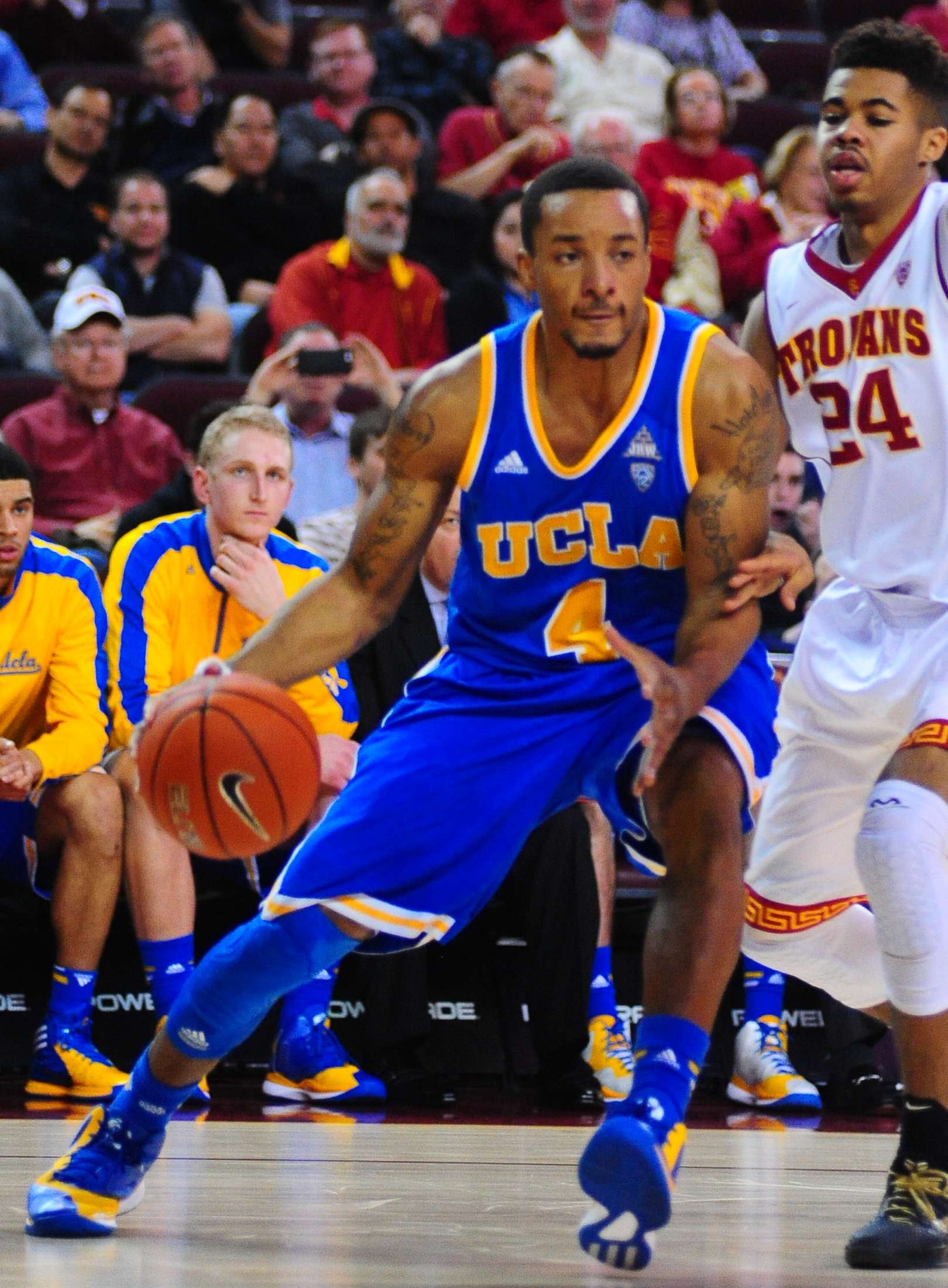
Powell against USC in 2015

Informed that he was unlikely to be drafted, Powell decided to return for his senior year, and became UCLA's top returning player and scorer for 2014–15 after underclassmen Adams, Kyle Anderson and Zach LaVine each declared for the NBA draft, while seniors Travis and David Wear graduated. During the offseason, Powell worked to improve his jump shot. As the season progressed, he grew to be a leader of the team, and increasingly took on more of the offensive load. Although freshman teammate Kevon Looney was seen as a potential NBA lottery pick, Powell became the Bruins' most consistent performer. On March 1, 2015, Powell scored a career-high 28 points in a 72–67 win over Washington State. He averaged 26 points and 5.5 rebounds in two games that week, and was honored with his conference-high third Pac-12 Player of the Week for the season. The Bruins went 2–0, helping them secure an eventual No.4 seed and first-round bye in the 2015 Pac-12 tournament, and maintaining their hopes of receiving a bid to the NCAA Tournament. At season's end, Powell was voted first-team All-Pac-12, and again received honorable mention for the All-Defensive Team. He was also named first-team all-district by the United States Basketball Writers Association (USBWA), and second-team all-district by the National Association of Basketball Coaches (NABC). He finished as the team leader in scoring with 16.4 points per game, the sixth highest in the conference.

== Professional career ==
=== Toronto Raptors (2015–2021) ===
==== Early years (2015–2017) ====
On June 25, 2015, Powell was selected with the 46th overall pick in the 2015 NBA draft by the Milwaukee Bucks. His draft rights, along with a 2017 first-round draft pick, were subsequently traded to the Toronto Raptors for Greivis Vásquez. After signing with Toronto on July 15, he played with the Raptors in the 2015 NBA Summer League in Las Vegas, where he was the only rookie to be named to the All-NBA Summer League First Team. Powell received playing time early in 2015–16 due to injuries to Terrence Ross and DeMarre Carroll. He later received multiple assignments to Raptors 905, Toronto's D-League affiliate.

With Carroll out after knee surgery and James Johnson sidelined with a sprained ankle, Powell made his first NBA start on February 2, 2016, going scoreless with two steals in 15 minutes in a 104–97 win over the Phoenix Suns. On March 15, he made his eighth career start and scored a then season-high 17 points in a 107–89 win over the Milwaukee Bucks. He topped that mark on March 28, scoring 18 points in a 119–100 loss to the Oklahoma City Thunder. Two days later, he scored 10 points in a 105–97 win over the Atlanta Hawks, helping the Raptors record a 50-win season for the first time in franchise history. On April 8, with All-Stars DeMar DeRozan and Kyle Lowry resting, Powell set a new season high with 27 points in a 111–98 win over the Indiana Pacers. In the Raptors' regular-season finale, Powell topped that mark again with 30 points in a 103–96 win over the Brooklyn Nets. After averaging an Eastern Conference-leading 15.3 points per game in April, he was named the conference's NBA Rookie of the Month.

Powell played sparingly for the Raptors over the first half of the 2016–17 season. With DeMarre Carroll sitting out back-to-back games early on in the season, Powell received a number of starting assignments. He would rise to the occasion every time he got an opportunity, only to go missing in action for a handful of games before his services were needed again. On December 20, 2016, Powell scored a season-high 21 off the bench in a 116–104 win over the Brooklyn Nets. He had three more 21-point games over the next three months. On April 24, 2017, in Game 5 of the Raptors' first-round playoff series against the Milwaukee Bucks, Powell scored a playoff career-high 25 points to help the Raptors take a 3–2 series lead with a 118–93 win.

==== Championship run and breakout seasons (2017–2021) ====
On October 8, 2017, Powell signed a four-year, $42 million contract extension with the Raptors. The deal, which started with the 2018–19 season, included a player option on the fourth year.

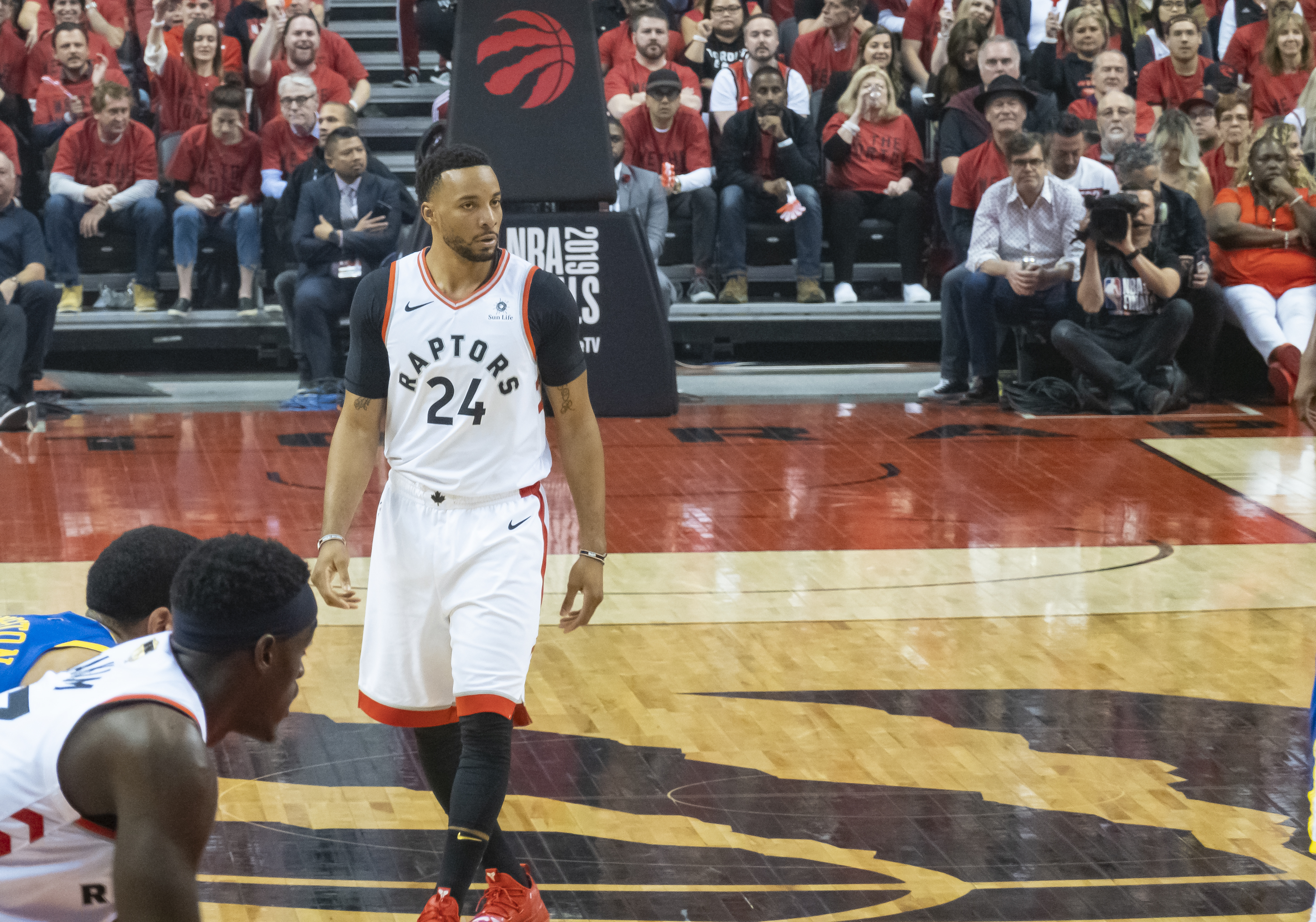
Powell in Game 2 of the 2019 NBA Finals

On November 5, 2018, against the Utah Jazz, Powell partially dislocated his left shoulder joint, and was ruled out indefinitely. He returned to action on December 19 against the Indiana Pacers after missing 21 games. On January 6, 2019, he scored a season-high 23 points in a 121–105 win over the Pacers. On March 22, he had a career-high 11 rebounds in a 116–109 loss to the Oklahoma City Thunder. On April 7, he matched his season high with 23 points in a 117–109 overtime win over the Miami Heat. Powell won his first championship when the Raptors defeated the Golden State Warriors in the 2019 NBA Finals in six games.

In 2019–20, Fred VanVleet became the starting shooting guard after Toronto lost Danny Green in free agency. Powell began the season scoring in double digits only once in the first seven games. On November 29, 2019, he scored 19 of his then career-high 33 points in the third quarter in a 90–83 win over the Orlando Magic. As a starter in December in place of an injured VanVleet, he scored 20 or more points in three straight contests for the first time in his career. Later in the month, Powell injured his shoulder against the Detroit Pistons, and was out for three weeks before returning in mid-January. On January 31, 2020, he fractured the fourth metacarpal of his left hand against the Pistons. He returned at the end of February after missing nine games. On March 5, Powell scored a then career-high 37 points in a 121–113 win over the Golden State Warriors. After averaging a conference-leading 31.3 points on 56 percent shooting and helping the Raptors win three road games that week, he was named the NBA's Eastern Conference player of the week for the first time in his career. Toronto advanced in the playoffs to the conference semifinals against the Boston Celtics, which Powell helped tie the series at 3 after scoring 15 of his 23 points in the two overtime periods in a 125–122 win in Game 6.

The following season in 2020–21, Powell moved into the starting lineup in mid-January 2021. On March 17, he scored a career-high 43 points in a close loss at Detroit.

=== Portland Trail Blazers (2021–2022) ===
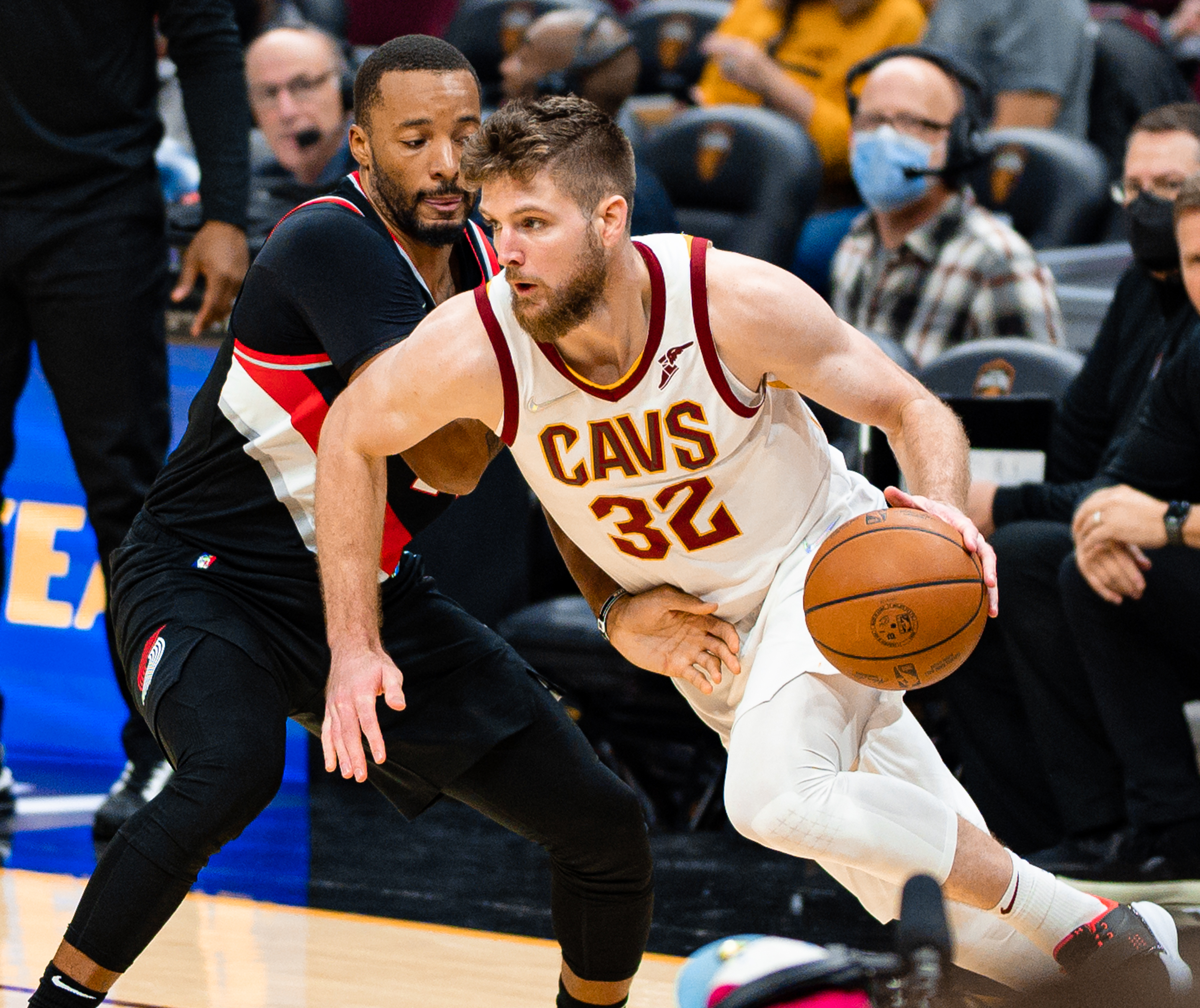
Powell with the Portland Trail Blazers guards Dean Wade of the Cleveland Cavaliers during a 2021 game

On March 25, 2021, the Portland Trail Blazers acquired Powell from Toronto in exchange for Gary Trent Jr. and Rodney Hood. At the time, Powell had made 31 starts in his 41 games and was averaging a career-high 19.6 points, while his 3-point field goal percentage of 43.9% ranked 10th in the league. On March 27, Powell made his debut and recorded a game-high 22 points in 36 minutes in a 112–105 victory over Orlando Magic. On August 6, 2021, Powell signed a new, five-year, $90 million contract with the Trail Blazers.

=== Los Angeles Clippers (2022–2025) ===
On February 4, 2022, Powell was traded, alongside Robert Covington, to the Los Angeles Clippers in exchange for Eric Bledsoe, Justise Winslow, Keon Johnson, and a 2025 second-round pick. The trade reunited Powell with former Toronto teammates Kawhi Leonard and Serge Ibaka, the latter of which would be traded to the Milwaukee Bucks on February 10. In his Clippers debut on February 6, Powell scored 28 points and recorded 4 assists in a 137–113 loss to the Milwaukee Bucks. On February 10, he suffered a medial sesamoid bone fracture in his left foot, which sidelined him for two months. Powell played in a total of seven games for the Clippers after the trade, including two play-in games, and averaged a career-high 20 points.

On February 10, 2024, Powell required stitches after he was hit in the face by the elbow of Jalen Duren during a game against the Detroit Pistons. The incident left him with a scar between his eyes.

On February 13, 2025, Powell scored 41 points in a 120–116 overtime win over the Utah Jazz. Powell also participated in the 2025 Three-Point Contest, losing in the first round.

=== Miami Heat (2025–2026) ===
On July 7, 2025, Powell was traded to the Miami Heat in a three-team deal that also included the Utah Jazz. He made his Heat debut on October 22, recording 28 points, nine rebounds and four assists in a 125–121 loss to the Orlando Magic. On November 14, Powell scored a season-high 38 points, alongside five rebounds, in a 140–130 loss to the New York Knicks. On January 1, 2026, he recorded 36 points, two rebounds and two assists in a 118–112 win over the Detroit Pistons. On February 1, Powell was named to his first All-Star Game as a Eastern Conference reserve.

The Heat ended the season with a 43–39 record and the tenth place in the Eastern Conference. In their April 14 play-in game against the Charlotte Hornets, Powell recorded eleven points and two rebounds in a 127–126 loss.

=== Chicago Bulls (2026–present) ===
On July 10, 2026, Powell signed a two-year, $45 million contract with the Chicago Bulls. On October 21, he made his Bulls debut, recording 15 points and five rebounds in a 135–92 loss to the Toronto Raptors.

== National team career ==
On August 4, 2025, Powell was named a part of the Jamaican national team for the 2027 FIBA World Cup Americas qualifiers.

== Career statistics ==
Legend
| GP | Games played | GS | Games started | MPG | Minutes per game |
| FG% | Field goal percentage | 3P% | 3-point field goal percentage | FT% | Free throw percentage |
| RPG | Rebounds per game | APG | Assists per game | SPG | Steals per game |
| BPG | Blocks per game | PPG | Points per game | **Bold** | Career high |
| † | Won an NBA championship |

=== NBA ===
==== Regular season ====
| Year | Team | GP | GS | MPG | FG% | 3P% | FT% | RPG | APG | SPG | BPG | PPG |
|---|---|---|---|---|---|---|---|---|---|---|---|---|
| 2015–16 | Toronto | 49 | 24 | 14.8 | .424 | .404 | .811 | 2.3 | 1.0 | .6 | .2 | 5.6 |
| 2016–17 | Toronto | **76** | 18 | 18.0 | .449 | .324 | .792 | 2.2 | 1.1 | .7 | .2 | 8.4 |
| 2017–18 | Toronto | 70 | 18 | 15.2 | .401 | .285 | .821 | 1.7 | 1.3 | .5 | .2 | 5.5 |
| 2018–19† | Toronto | 60 | 3 | 18.8 | .483 | .400 | .827 | 2.3 | 1.5 | .7 | .2 | 8.6 |
| 2019–20 | Toronto | 52 | 26 | 28.4 | .495 | .399 | .843 | **3.7** | 1.8 | 1.2 | .4 | 16.0 |
| 2020–21 | Toronto | 42 | 31 | 30.4 | .498 | .439 | .865 | 3.0 | 1.8 | 1.1 | .2 | 19.6 |
| 2020–21 | Portland | 27 | 27 | **34.4** | .443 | .361 | **.880** | 3.3 | 1.9 | **1.3** | .4 | 17.0 |
| 2021–22 | Portland | 40 | 39 | 33.3 | .456 | .406 | .803 | 3.3 | 2.1 | 1.0 | .4 | 18.7 |
| 2021–22 | L.A. Clippers | 5 | 2 | 25.1 | **.508** | **.542** | .857 | 2.8 | **2.8** | .4 | **.8** | 21.4 |
| 2022–23 | L.A. Clippers | 60 | 8 | 26.1 | .479 | .397 | .812 | 2.9 | 1.8 | .8 | .3 | 17.0 |
| 2023–24 | L.A. Clippers | **76** | 3 | 26.2 | .486 | .435 | .831 | 2.6 | 1.1 | .6 | .3 | 13.9 |
| 2024–25 | L.A. Clippers | 60 | **60** | 32.6 | .484 | .418 | .804 | 3.2 | 2.1 | 1.2 | .2 | **21.8** |
| 2025–26 | Miami | 58 | 52 | 29.2 | .470 | .380 | .827 | 3.5 | 2.5 | 1.1 | .2 | 21.7 |
| Career | | 675 | 311 | 24.7 | .471 | .396 | .824 | 2.7 | 1.6 | .8 | .3 | 14.0 |
| All-Star | | 1 | 0 | 13.7 | .286 | .000 | .500 | 2.0 | 2.0 | .0 | .0 | 5.0 |

==== Playoffs ====
| Year | Team | GP | GS | MPG | FG% | 3P% | FT% | RPG | APG | SPG | BPG | PPG |
|---|---|---|---|---|---|---|---|---|---|---|---|---|
| 2016 | Toronto | 18 | 3 | 11.4 | .386 | .269 | .875 | 1.5 | .3 | .7 | .1 | 3.8 |
| 2017 | Toronto | 9 | 5 | 25.2 | .427 | .441 | .833 | **3.1** | 1.6 | **1.1** | .3 | 11.7 |
| 2018 | Toronto | 6 | 0 | 6.7 | .286 | .143 | .750 | .3 | .3 | .0 | .0 | 2.0 |
| 2019† | Toronto | **23** | 0 | 15.9 | .444 | .387 | .737 | 2.2 | 1.1 | .4 | .0 | 6.5 |
| 2020 | Toronto | 11 | 0 | 24.8 | .490 | .423 | .793 | 2.4 | 1.0 | .5 | .3 | 13.4 |
| 2021 | Portland | 6 | 6 | **36.0** | **.500** | .385 | **.889** | 2.2 | 2.0 | .8 | **1.0** | 17.0 |
| 2023 | L.A. Clippers | 5 | 3 | 33.5 | .474 | .406 | .774 | 3.0 | 2.2 | .8 | .4 | **21.8** |
| 2024 | L.A. Clippers | 6 | 0 | 29.8 | .426 | **.448** | .800 | 2.8 | .3 | .5 | .0 | 12.8 |
| 2025 | L.A. Clippers | 7 | **7** | 34.0 | .472 | .350 | .778 | 2.4 | **2.4** | **1.1** | .3 | 16.0 |
| Career | | 91 | 24 | 21.0 | .451 | .386 | .801 | 2.2 | 1.1 | .6 | .2 | 9.7 |

=== College ===
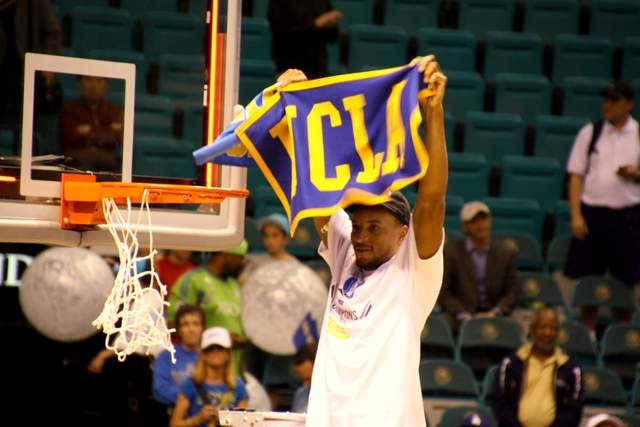
Powell after UCLA won the 2014 Pac-12 tournament

| Year | Team | GP | GS | MPG | FG% | 3P% | FT% | RPG | APG | SPG | BPG | PPG |
|---|---|---|---|---|---|---|---|---|---|---|---|---|
| 2011–12 | UCLA | 33 | 1 | 17.8 | .377 | **.347** | .600 | 2.2 | 1.2 | .5 | .3 | 4.6 |
| 2012–13 | UCLA | 35 | 9 | 22.1 | .434 | .293 | .675 | 2.2 | 1.1 | .7 | **.5** | 6.1 |
| 2013–14 | UCLA | **37** | **37** | 25.7 | **.533** | .294 | **.780** | 2.8 | 1.7 | 1.4 | .4 | 11.4 |
| 2014–15 | UCLA | 36 | 36 | **34.6** | .456 | .319 | .751 | **4.7** | **2.1** | **1.8** | .4 | **16.4** |
| Career | | 141 | 83 | 25.2 | .461 | .314 | .746 | 3.0 | 1.5 | 1.1 | .4 | 9.8 |

== Personal life ==
Powell has two older sisters, Joniece and Margaret. He majored in history at UCLA.

In October 2017, Powell teamed with web host GoDaddy to launch his website and his first single, "No Problem".

== See also ==
- List of NBA career 3-point field goal percentage leaders
