= Kai Jones =

Bahamian basketball player (born 2001)

- Jones with Anadolu Efes in 2026

No. 88 – Anadolu Efes
- Position: Center / power forward
- League: BSL; EuroLeague

Personal information
- Born: January 19, 2001 (age 25) Nassau, The Bahamas
- Listed height: 6 ft 11 in (2.11 m)
- Listed weight: 221 lb (100 kg)

Career information
- High school: Orlando Christian Prep (Orlando, Florida); Brewster Academy (Wolfeboro, New Hampshire)
- College: Texas (2019–2021)
- NBA draft: 2021: 1st round, 19th overall pick
- Drafted by: New York Knicks
- Playing career: 2021–present

Career history
- 2021–2023: Charlotte Hornets
- 2021–2023: →Greensboro Swarm
- 2024: Delaware Blue Coats
- 2024–2025: Los Angeles Clippers
- 2024–2025: →San Diego Clippers
- 2025: Dallas Mavericks
- 2025–present: Anadolu Efes

Career highlights
- VTB United League Supercup winner (2026); Big 12 Sixth Man of the Year (2021)
- Stats at NBA.com
- Stats at Basketball Reference

Kai Martinez Jones (born January 19, 2001) is a Bahamian professional basketball player for Anadolu Efes of the Turkish Basketbol Süper Ligi (BSL) and the EuroLeague. He previously played in the NBA for the Charlotte Hornets and Dallas Mavericks. He played college basketball for the Texas Longhorns.

== Early life ==
Born in Nassau, Bahamas, Jones moved to the United States when he was 11 years old. After his sophomore year in high school, he returned to his home country hoping to pursue a career as a long jumper. At age 15, Jones played organized basketball for his first time, being drawn to the sport after having a growth spurt.

== High school career ==
In the summer of 2017, Jones took part in a Basketball Without Borders Americas camp held by the National Basketball Association (NBA) in Nassau. That year, he worked out with and took advice from top high school recruit Deandre Ayton in their hometown of Nassau. As a result, Jones was inspired to play basketball in the United States. For the 2017–18 season, he enrolled at Orlando Christian Prep in Orlando, Florida, as a high school senior. He was teammates with five-star recruits Nassir Little and C. J. Walker and helped win the Florida High School Athletic Association (FHSAA) Class 3A state championship. In high school, Jones woke up at 4:45 a.m. every day to train and played basketball after school. At the same time, he saw academic success, graduating with a 4.2 grade point average and summa cum laude honors.

In the summer of 2018, Jones attended the NBA Global Camp in Treviso, Italy. Following his senior year, he played a postgraduate season at Brewster Academy in Wolfeboro, New Hampshire. On February 4, 2019, Jones was named to the National Prep Invitational all-tournament team. In March, he helped Brewster Academy win the USA National Prep Championship.

=== Recruiting ===
On October 15, 2018, Jones committed to play college basketball for Texas. He chose to join the Longhorns over offers from several other NCAA Division I programs, including Arizona, Kansas, and Oregon.

College recruiting
Name	Hometown	School	Height	Weight	Commit date
Kai Jones; C	Nassau, Bahamas	Brewster Academy (NH)	6 ft 10 in (2.08 m)	205 lb (93 kg)	Oct 15, 2018
Kai Jones; C	Recruit ratings: Rivals: 247Sports: ESPN: (88)				
Overall recruit ranking: Rivals: 59 247Sports: 49 ESPN: 53
Note: In many cases, Scout, Rivals, 247Sports, On3, and ESPN may conflict in their listings of height and weight.; In these cases, the average was taken. ESPN grades are on a 100-point scale.; Sources: "Texas 2019 Basketball Commitments". Rivals.; "2019 Texas Longhorns Recruiting Class". ESPN.; "2019 Team Ranking". Rivals.

== College career ==
Coach Shaka Smart said that Jones had the best work ethic of any big man he coached. Despite this, Jones struggled to get playing time early in his freshman season. He gradually saw more playing time as the season progressed, finishing with eight points on 4–5 shooting from the field in just 10 minutes of the Longhorns' 73–71 win over McNeese State on November 30. As a freshman, Jones averaged 3.6 points and 3.2 rebounds per game. On January 26, 2021, he registered his first double-double, with 15 points and 10 rebounds in an 80–79 loss to Oklahoma. Jones was named Big 12 Sixth Man of the Year and to the All-Big 12 honorable mention. As a sophomore, he averaged 8.8 points and 4.8 rebounds per game. On March 24, 2021, Jones declared for the 2021 NBA draft.

== Professional career ==
=== Charlotte Hornets (2021–2023) ===
Jones was selected with the 19th pick in the 2021 NBA draft by the New York Knicks and immediately traded to the Charlotte Hornets. On August 3, he officially signed with the Hornets.

On September 30, 2023, the Hornets announced that Jones would not participate in training camp and offered no timetable for his return to the team. The decision came after Jones displayed bizarre behavior on social media which included criticism of his teammates, incoherent speech, and declarations of being the greatest basketball player of all time.

On October 9, 2023, Jones publicly requested a trade on X and two days later, he was waived by the Hornets. No team claimed his waiver, making him a free agent. He averaged 2.7 points in 9.1 minutes per game during his two seasons with the Hornets.

=== Delaware Blue Coats (2024) ===
On March 15, 2024, Jones signed a 10-day contract with the Philadelphia 76ers. However, he only played for the Delaware Blue Coats, Philadelphia's G League affiliate.

=== Los Angeles Clippers (2024–2025) ===
On April 14, 2024, Jones signed for the rest of the season with the Los Angeles Clippers. On July 9, he re-signed with the Clippers and on October 19, his deal converted into a two-way contract. On March 1, 2025, the Clippers waived Jones.

=== Dallas Mavericks (2025) ===
On March 2, 2025, Jones signed a two-way contract with the Dallas Mavericks, and on March 3, he made his debut in Dallas, coming off the bench in a 122–98 loss over the Sacramento Kings; he had 21 points, eight rebounds, and one block in the defeat. Jones made 12 appearances (six starts) for the Mavericks during the 2024–25 NBA season, averaging 11.4 points, 6.6 rebounds, and 1.3 assists.

=== Anadolu Efes (2025–present) ===
On September 15, 2025, Jones signed with Anadolu Efes of the Basketbol Süper Ligi (BSL).

On February 15, 2026, Jones agreed to a two-year contract extension with the team.

== National team career ==
Jones was a member of the Bahamian junior national team at the 2019 Centrobasket Under-17 Championship in the Dominican Republic. His team finished seventh place out of eight teams.

== Career statistics ==
Legend
GP	Games played	GS	Games started	MPG	Minutes per game
FG%	Field goal percentage	3P%	3-point field goal percentage	FT%	Free throw percentage
RPG	Rebounds per game	APG	Assists per game	SPG	Steals per game
BPG	Blocks per game	PPG	Points per game	**Bold**	Career high

=== NBA ===
==== Regular season ====
Year	Team	GP	GS	MPG	FG%	3P%	FT%	RPG	APG	SPG	BPG	PPG
2021–22	Charlotte	21	0	3.0	.643	**.500**	.375	.5	.2	.0	.1	1.0
2022–23	Charlotte	**46**	0	12.0	.558	.211	.731	2.7	.3	.4	.7	3.4
2024–25	L.A. Clippers	28	0	7.4	.722	.000	**.750**	1.6	.4	.2	.5	2.2
2024–25	Dallas	12	**6**	**21.7**	**.836**	.333	.700	**6.6**	**1.3**	**.8**	**.8**	**11.4**
Career		107	6	10.1	.671	.231	.682	2.4	.4	.3	.5	3.5

=== College ===
Year	Team	GP	GS	MPG	FG%	3P%	FT%	RPG	APG	SPG	BPG	PPG
2019–20	Texas	**27**	**10**	16.7	.500	.292	.636	3.2	.4	.5	**1.1**	3.6
2020–21	Texas	26	4	**22.8**	**.580**	**.382**	**.689**	**4.8**	**.6**	**.8**	.9	**8.8**
Career		53	14	19.7	.553	.345	.677	4.0	.5	.7	1.0	6.2
