= 2024–25 Los Angeles Clippers season =

- Head coach: Tyronn Lue
- General manager: Trent Redden
- Owner: Steve Ballmer
- Arena: Intuit Dome

Results
- Record: 50–32 (.610)
- Place: Division: 2nd (Pacific); Conference: 5th (Western)
- Playoff finish: First round (lost to Nuggets 3–4)
- Stats at Basketball Reference

Local media
- Television: FanDuel Sports Network West; FanDuel Sports Network SoCal; KTLA
- Radio: KLAC

The 2024–25 Los Angeles Clippers season was the 55th season of the franchise in the National Basketball Association (NBA), their 47th season in Southern California, and their 1st season in Inglewood. The Clippers moved to the new Intuit Dome before the start of the season. On June 12, 2024, the NBA announced that the former great Lakers player and Clippers executive consultant Jerry West had died, several months removed from his third and final entry into the Naismith Basketball Hall of Fame (this time as a contributor to the sport both as an executive and as a consultant). Six days later, on June 18, Jeff Van Gundy would join the Clippers' coaching staff as an assistant coach, returning to a coaching staff for the first time since 2007. This was the first season since 2018–19 without Paul George, as on June 30, the Clippers announced that he will not return to the franchise.

Before the season opener commenced, it was announced that Kawhi Leonard would be out for an indefinite period of time due to an inflamed right knee, leaving James Harden as the only star player for the team during that period of time. For their season opener at the newly created Intuit Dome, the Clippers would have their opening night spoiled with a tense 116–113 overtime loss to the Phoenix Suns (though they would win their very first game held there against the Dallas Mavericks 110–96 during the preseason). They would eventually get their first win at their new home arena with a 113–104 win over the San Antonio Spurs on November 4, 2024. During the season, the Clippers would have their January 11, 2025 match against the Charlotte Hornets postponed due to the January 2025 Southern California wildfires.

On April 13, the Clippers clinched their third consecutive playoff berth following their victory over the Golden State Warriors. They would lose to the Denver Nuggets in the First Round.

Following the 2025 NBA Finals, where the Oklahoma City Thunder won the championship over the Indiana Pacers in seven games, the Clippers were mocked on social media for their trade of Shai Gilgeous-Alexander for Paul George.

== Draft ==
Round	Pick	Player	Position	Nationality	College / club
2	46	Cam Christie	SG	United States	Minnesota

The Clippers entered this draft (which was two days long) with only one second-round selection, which originally belonged to the Indiana Pacers and acquired via trade with the Memphis Grizzlies as the most favorable pick in a three-team hierarchy. They had already traded their 2025 first-round pick to the Oklahoma City Thunder in 2019 in exchange for Paul George before ultimately landing with the Washington Wizards in the draft, as well as their original 2025 second-round pick to the Los Angeles Lakers in 2023.

On the second and final day of the draft, the Clippers used their only pick of the draft to select shooting guard Cam Christie from the University of Minnesota.

== Roster ==
2024–25 Los Angeles Clippers roster
Players

Pos.	No.	Player	Height	Weight	DOB	From
F	23	Patrick Baldwin Jr. (TW)	6 ft 9 in (2.06 m)	215 lb (98 kg)	2002-11-18	Milwaukee
F	33	Nicolas Batum	6 ft 8 in (2.03 m)	230 lb (104 kg)	1988-12-14	France
G	10	Bogdan Bogdanović	6 ft 5 in (1.96 m)	225 lb (102 kg)	1992-08-18	Serbia
F	21	Kobe Brown	6 ft 7 in (2.01 m)	250 lb (113 kg)	2000-01-01	Missouri
G	12	Cam Christie	6 ft 6 in (1.98 m)	190 lb (86 kg)	2005-07-24	Minnesota
G/F	7	Amir Coffey	6 ft 7 in (2.01 m)	210 lb (95 kg)	1997-06-17	Minnesota
G	8	Kris Dunn	6 ft 3 in (1.91 m)	205 lb (93 kg)	1994-03-18	Providence
C	15	Drew Eubanks	6 ft 10 in (2.08 m)	245 lb (111 kg)	1997-02-01	Oregon State
F	9	Trentyn Flowers (TW)	6 ft 9 in (2.06 m)	185 lb (84 kg)	2005-03-08	Combine Academy (NC)
G	1	James Harden	6 ft 5 in (1.96 m)	220 lb (100 kg)	1989-08-26	Arizona State
F	55	Derrick Jones Jr.	6 ft 6 in (1.98 m)	210 lb (95 kg)	1997-02-15	UNLV
F	2	Kawhi Leonard	6 ft 7 in (2.01 m)	225 lb (102 kg)	1991-06-29	San Diego State
F	11	Jordan Miller	6 ft 5 in (1.96 m)	194 lb (88 kg)	2000-01-23	Miami (FL)
G	88	Patty Mills	6 ft 2 in (1.88 m)	180 lb (82 kg)	1988-08-11	Saint Mary's
G	24	Norman Powell	6 ft 3 in (1.91 m)	215 lb (98 kg)	1993-05-25	UCLA
G/F	25	Ben Simmons	6 ft 10 in (2.08 m)	240 lb (109 kg)	1996-07-20	LSU
C	40	Ivica Zubac	7 ft 0 in (2.13 m)	240 lb (109 kg)	1997-03-18	Croatia

Coaches
Head coach
- Tyronn Lue
Assistant(s)
- Jeremy Castleberry
- Larry Drew
- Shaun Fein
- Dahntay Jones
- Jay Larranaga
- Brendan O'Connor
- Brian Shaw
- Jeff Van Gundy

Legend
- (DP) Unsigned draft pick
- (FA) Free agent
- (S) Suspended
- (GL) On assignment to G League affiliate
- (TW) Two-way affiliate player
- Injured

Roster
Updated: May 30, 2026

=== Roster notes ===
- Forward Nicolas Batum makes his second tour of duty with the team having played for them from 2020 to 2023.
- Center Mo Bamba is the 32nd former Lakers player to play for the Clippers. He played in 28 games before getting traded in February.

== Standings ==
=== Division ===
Pacific Division	W	L	PCT	GB	Home	Road	Div	GP
y – Los Angeles Lakers	50	32	.610	–	31‍–‍10	19‍–‍22	12‍–‍4	82
x – Los Angeles Clippers	50	32	.610	–	30‍–‍11	20‍–‍21	9‍–‍7	82
x – Golden State Warriors	48	34	.585	2.0	24‍–‍17	24‍–‍17	5‍–‍11	82
pi – Sacramento Kings	40	42	.488	10.0	20‍–‍21	20‍–‍21	5‍–‍11	82
Phoenix Suns	36	46	.439	14.0	24‍–‍17	12‍–‍29	9‍–‍7	82

=== Conference ===
Western Conference
#	Team	W	L	PCT	GB	GP
1	z – Oklahoma City Thunder *	68	14	.829	–	82
2	y – Houston Rockets *	52	30	.634	16.0	82
3	y – Los Angeles Lakers *	50	32	.610	18.0	82
4	x – Denver Nuggets	50	32	.610	18.0	82
5	x – Los Angeles Clippers	50	32	.610	18.0	82
6	x – Minnesota Timberwolves	49	33	.598	19.0	82
7	x – Golden State Warriors	48	34	.585	20.0	82
8	x – Memphis Grizzlies	48	34	.585	20.0	82
9	pi – Sacramento Kings	40	42	.488	28.0	82
10	pi – Dallas Mavericks	39	43	.476	29.0	82
11	Phoenix Suns	36	46	.439	32.0	82
12	Portland Trail Blazers	36	46	.439	32.0	82
13	San Antonio Spurs	34	48	.415	34.0	82
14	New Orleans Pelicans	21	61	.256	47.0	82
15	Utah Jazz	17	65	.207	51.0	82

== Game log ==
=== Preseason ===
During the preseason, the Clippers would play their final games under what was previously named Bally Sports West and Bally Sports SoCal. Bally Sports would rebrand itself to the FanDuel Sports Network before the start of the regular season.

2024 preseason game log
Total: 4–1 (Home: 4–1; Road: 0–0)
Preseason: 4–1 (home: 4–1; road: 0–0)

Game	Date	Team	Score	High points	High rebounds	High assists	Location Attendance	Record
1	October 5	Golden State	L 90–91	Ivica Zubac (14)	Kobe Brown (9)	James Harden (8)	Stan Sheriff Center; 10,300	0–1
2	October 8	Brooklyn	W 115–106	James Harden (14)	Alondes Williams (6)	Alondes Williams (7)	Frontwave Arena; 6,190	1–1
3	October 11	Portland	W 101–99	Derrick Jones Jr. (16)	Brown, K. Jones, Miller (6)	Harden, Williams (5)	Climate Pledge Arena; 18,300	2–1
4	October 14	Dallas	W 110–96	Kevin Porter Jr. (18)	Ivica Zubac (12)	James Harden (12)	Intuit Dome; 13,400	3–1
5	October 17	Sacramento	W 113–91	Jordan Miller (21)	Kobe Brown (8)	Kobe Brown (6)	Intuit Dome; 13,800	4–1

2024–25 preseason schedule

=== Regular season ===
2024–25 game log
Total: 50–32 (Home: 30–11; Road: 20–21)
October: 2–3 (home: 0–3; road: 2–0)

Game	Date	Team	Score	High points	High rebounds	High assists	Location Attendance	Record
1	October 23	Phoenix	L 113–116 (OT)	James Harden (29)	James Harden (12)	Harden, Jones (8)	Intuit Dome; 18,300	0–1
2	October 26	@ Denver	W 109–104	Norman Powell (37)	Ivica Zubac (15)	James Harden (16)	Ball Arena; 19,691	1–1
3	October 27	@ Golden State	W 112–104	Harden, Zubac (23)	Ivica Zubac (18)	James Harden (11)	Chase Center; 18,064	2–1
4	October 30	Portland	L 105–106	Norman Powell (30)	Ivica Zubac (12)	James Harden (10)	Intuit Dome; 16,727	2–2
5	October 31	Phoenix	L 119–125	James Harden (25)	Ivica Zubac (12)	James Harden (13)	Intuit Dome; 16,827	2–3

November: 10–6 (home: 7–1; road: 3–5)

Game	Date	Team	Score	High points	High rebounds	High assists	Location Attendance	Record
6	November 2	Oklahoma City	L 92–105	Norman Powell (24)	James Harden (13)	James Harden (7)	Intuit Dome; 16,827	2–4
7	November 4	San Antonio	W 113–104	Norman Powell (23)	Ivica Zubac (13)	Kevin Porter Jr. (7)	Intuit Dome; 15,927	3–4
8	November 6	Philadelphia	W 110–98	Norman Powell (26)	Ivica Zubac (9)	Harden, Powell (6)	Intuit Dome; 15,627	4–4
9	November 8	@ Sacramento	W 107–98	Norman Powell (31)	Ivica Zubac (15)	James Harden (8)	Golden 1 Center; 17,832	5–4
10	November 9	Toronto	W 105–103	Harden, Powell (24)	Harden, Zubac (12)	James Harden (7)	Intuit Dome; 17,927	6–4
11	November 11	@ Oklahoma City	L 128–134	Norman Powell (31)	Ivica Zubac (14)	James Harden (9)	Paycom Center; 17,430	6–5
12	November 13	@ Houston	L 103–111	James Harden (19)	Terance Mann (7)	Kris Dunn (8)	Toyota Center; 16,493	6–6
13	November 15	@ Houston	L 104–125	James Harden (21)	Ivica Zubac (11)	Coffey, Porter Jr. (3)	Toyota Center; 18,055	6–7
14	November 17	Utah	W 116–105	Ivica Zubac (22)	Ivica Zubac (11)	James Harden (11)	Intuit Dome; 15,500	7–7
15	November 18	Golden State	W 102–99	Norman Powell (23)	Ivica Zubac (17)	James Harden (16)	Intuit Dome; 17,927	8–7
16	November 20	Orlando	W 104–93	James Harden (24)	Ivica Zubac (12)	Kevin Porter Jr. (6)	Intuit Dome; 16,563	9–7
17	November 22	Sacramento	W 104–88	James Harden (22)	Ivica Zubac (15)	James Harden (9)	Intuit Dome; 16,228	10–7
18	November 24	@ Philadelphia	W 125–99	James Harden (23)	Ivica Zubac (12)	James Harden (8)	Wells Fargo Center; 19,780	11–7
19	November 25	@ Boston	L 94–126	Ivica Zubac (23)	Ivica Zubac (10)	James Harden (9)	TD Garden; 19,156	11–8
20	November 27	@ Washington	W 121–96	James Harden (43)	Ivica Zubac (16)	James Harden (7)	Capital One Arena; 15,066	12–8
21	November 29	@ Minnesota	L 92–93	James Harden (20)	Ivica Zubac (13)	James Harden (11)	Target Center; 18,978	12–9

December: 7–5 (home: 4–2; road: 3–3)

Game	Date	Team	Score	High points	High rebounds	High assists	Location Attendance	Record
22	December 1	Denver	W 126–122	James Harden (39)	James Harden (9)	James Harden (11)	Intuit Dome; 16,182	13–9
23	December 3	Portland	W 127–105	Norman Powell (30)	Ivica Zubac (10)	James Harden (7)	Intuit Dome; 15,583	14–9
24	December 4	Minnesota	L 80–108	Bones Hyland (18)	Ivica Zubac (10)	James Harden (3)	Intuit Dome; 15,111	14–10
25	December 8	Houston	L 106–117	Bones Hyland (22)	Ivica Zubac (12)	Kevin Porter Jr. (6)	Intuit Dome; 14,782	14–11
26	December 13	@ Denver	L 98–120	Porter Jr., Powell (16)	Ivica Zubac (13)	James Harden (6)	Ball Arena; 19,779	14–12
27	December 16	Utah	W 144–107	James Harden (41)	Ivica Zubac (12)	Harden, Porter Jr. (6)	Intuit Dome; 14,651	15–12
28	December 19	@ Dallas	W 118–95	Norman Powell (29)	Ivica Zubac (15)	James Harden (7)	American Airlines Center; 20,044	16–12
29	December 21	@ Dallas	L 97–113	Norman Powell (28)	Ivica Zubac (15)	Dunn, Harden, Porter Jr., Zubac (3)	American Airlines Center; 20,102	16–13
30	December 23	@ Memphis	W 114–110	Norman Powell (29)	Ivica Zubac (19)	James Harden (9)	FedExForum; 17,265	17–13
31	December 27	Golden State	W 102–92	Norman Powell (26)	Ivica Zubac (11)	James Harden (7)	Intuit Dome; 17,927	18–13
32	December 30	@ New Orleans	W 116–113	Norman Powell (35)	Ivica Zubac (16)	Kris Dunn (6)	Smoothie King Center; 17,303	19–13
33	December 31	@ San Antonio	L 86–122	James Harden (17)	Ivica Zubac (7)	Kevin Porter Jr. (4)	Frost Bank Center; 18,690	19–14

January: 9–6 (home: 6–2; road: 3–4)

Game	Date	Team	Score	High points	High rebounds	High assists	Location Attendance	Record
34	January 2	@ Oklahoma City	L 98–116	Amir Coffey (26)	Ivica Zubac (9)	Dunn, Miller (5)	Paycom Center; 18,203	19–15
35	January 4	Atlanta	W 131–105	Norman Powell (20)	Ivica Zubac (18)	James Harden (15)	Intuit Dome; 17,927	20–15
36	January 6	@ Minnesota	L 106–108	Norman Powell (25)	Ivica Zubac (16)	James Harden (8)	Target Center; 18,978	20–16
37	January 8	@ Denver	L 103–126	Norman Powell (30)	Bamba, Zubac (8)	James Harden (4)	Ball Arena; 19,711	20–17
—	January 11	Charlotte	Postponed due to the January 2025 Southern California wildfires; Makeup date March 16					
38	January 13	Miami	W 109–98	Norman Powell (29)	Ivica Zubac (20)	James Harden (11)	Intuit Dome; 13,119	21–17
39	January 15	Brooklyn	W 126–67	Kawhi Leonard (23)	Ivica Zubac (9)	James Harden (11)	Intuit Dome; 13,091	22–17
40	January 16	@ Portland	W 118–89	Norman Powell (23)	Ivica Zubac (8)	James Harden (6)	Moda Center; 16,374	23–17
41	January 19	L.A. Lakers	W 116–102	Norman Powell (22)	Ivica Zubac (19)	James Harden (12)	Intuit Dome; 17,927	24–17
42	January 20	Chicago	L 99–112	Norman Powell (27)	Mo Bamba (7)	James Harden (10)	Intuit Dome; 15,293	24–18
43	January 22	Boston	L 113–117 (OT)	Derrick Jones Jr. (29)	Kobe Brown (11)	Mann, Porter Jr. (7)	Intuit Dome; 15,342	24–19
44	January 23	Washington	W 110–93	Norman Powell (22)	James Harden (12)	James Harden (13)	Intuit Dome; 13,771	25–19
45	January 25	Milwaukee	W 127–117	James Harden (40)	Ivica Zubac (10)	James Harden (9)	Intuit Dome; 17,927	26–19
46	January 27	@ Phoenix	L 109–111	Ivica Zubac (25)	Ivica Zubac (16)	James Harden (10)	Footprint Center; 17,071	26–20
47	January 29	@ San Antonio	W 128–116	Leonard, Powell (27)	Ivica Zubac (22)	James Harden (11)	Frost Bank Center; 18,354	27–20
48	January 31	@ Charlotte	W 112–104	Norman Powell (27)	Ivica Zubac (11)	James Harden (10)	Spectrum Center; 15,342	28–20

February: 4–7 (home: 2–2; road: 2–5)

Game	Date	Team	Score	High points	High rebounds	High assists	Location Attendance	Record
49	February 2	@ Toronto	L 108–115	James Harden (25)	Ivica Zubac (8)	James Harden (7)	Scotiabank Arena; 18,874	28–21
50	February 4	L.A. Lakers	L 97–122	Norman Powell (20)	Ivica Zubac (10)	James Harden (9)	Intuit Dome; 17,927	28–22
51	February 6	Indiana	L 112–119	Harden, Powell (22)	Ivica Zubac (15)	James Harden (10)	Intuit Dome; 13,458	29–22
52	February 8	Utah	W 130–110	Powell, Zubac (26)	Ivica Zubac (15)	James Harden (17)	Intuit Dome; 15,892	29–23
53	February 12	Memphis	W 128–114	Kawhi Leonard (25)	Ivica Zubac (13)	James Harden (10)	Intuit Dome; 14,997	30–23
54	February 13	@ Utah	W 120–116 (OT)	Norman Powell (41)	James Harden (10)	James Harden (7)	Delta Center; 18,175	31–23
All-Star Game
55	February 20	@ Milwaukee	L 110–116	Kawhi Leonard (25)	Ivica Zubac (15)	James Harden (8)	Fiserv Forum; 17,341	31–24
56	February 23	@ Indiana	L 111–129	James Harden (31)	James Harden (7)	James Harden (11)	Gainbridge Fieldhouse; 16,950	31–25
57	February 24	@ Detroit	L 97–106	James Harden (18)	Ivica Zubac (15)	Bogdanović, Harden, Zubac (5)	Little Caesars Arena; 18,989	31–26
58	February 26	@ Chicago	W 122–117	James Harden (30)	Ivica Zubac (10)	Ben Simmons (8)	United Center; 20,356	32–26
59	February 28	@ L.A. Lakers	L 102–106	Ivica Zubac (27)	Ivica Zubac (16)	James Harden (9)	Crypto.com Arena; 18,997	32–27

March: 12–5 (home: 7–1; road: 5–4)

Game	Date	Team	Score	High points	High rebounds	High assists	Location Attendance	Record
60	March 2	@ L.A. Lakers	L 102–108	Kawhi Leonard (33)	Leonard, Zubac (10)	James Harden (8)	Crypto.com Arena; 18,997	32–28
61	March 4	@ Phoenix	L 117–119	Ivica Zubac (35)	Ivica Zubac (10)	James Harden (15)	PHX Arena; 17,071	32–29
62	March 5	Detroit	W 123–115	James Harden (50)	Ivica Zubac (11)	Kris Dunn (6)	Intuit Dome; 17,927	33–29
63	March 7	New York	W 105–95	James Harden (27)	Ivica Zubac (14)	James Harden (7)	Intuit Dome; 17,927	34–29
64	March 9	Sacramento	W 111–110 (OT)	James Harden (29)	Ivica Zubac (14)	James Harden (11)	Intuit Dome; 17,927	35–29
65	March 11	@ New Orleans	L 120–127	Kawhi Leonard (29)	Ivica Zubac (11)	James Harden (17)	Smoothie King Center; 17,363	35–30
66	March 12	@ Miami	W 119–104	Bogdan Bogdanović (30)	Ivica Zubac (14)	James Harden (11)	Kaseya Center; 19,700	36–30
67	March 14	@ Atlanta	W 121–98	Harden, Leonard (25)	James Harden (8)	James Harden (7)	State Farm Arena; 16,561	37–30
68	March 16	Charlotte	W 123–88	James Harden (31)	Ivica Zubac (14)	Ivica Zubac (8)	Intuit Dome; 17,927	38–30
69	March 18	Cleveland	W 132–119	Kawhi Leonard (33)	Ivica Zubac (20)	James Harden (9)	Intuit Dome; 17,927	39–30
70	March 21	Memphis	W 128–108	James Harden (30)	Leonard, Zubac (10)	James Harden (9)	Intuit Dome; 17,927	40–30
71	March 23	Oklahoma City	L 101–103	Kawhi Leonard (25)	Ivica Zubac (11)	James Harden (8)	Intuit Dome; 17,927	40–31
72	March 26	@ New York	W 126–113	James Harden (29)	Leonard, Zubac (10)	Kawhi Leonard (7)	Madison Square Garden; 19,812	41–31
73	March 28	@ Brooklyn	W 132–100	Kawhi Leonard (31)	Ivica Zubac (12)	Bogdan Bogdanović (9)	Barclays Center; 17,926	42–31
74	March 30	@ Cleveland	L 122–127	Norman Powell (34)	Ivica Zubac (13)	James Harden (8)	Rocket Arena; 19,432	42–32
75	March 31	@ Orlando	W 96–87	Leonard, Powell (21)	Ivica Zubac (20)	Harden, Zubac (5)	Kia Center; 17,522	43–32

April: 7–0 (home: 5–0; road: 2–0)

Game	Date	Team	Score	High points	High rebounds	High assists	Location Attendance	Record
76	April 2	New Orleans	W 114–98	Kawhi Leonard (28)	Ivica Zubac (10)	James Harden (10)	Intuit Dome; 17,109	44–32
77	April 4	Dallas	W 114–91	Kawhi Leonard (20)	Ivica Zubac (13)	Bogdan Bogdanović (6)	Intuit Dome; 17,927	45–32
78	April 5	Dallas	W 135–104	Harden, Leonard (29)	Ivica Zubac (10)	James Harden (14)	Intuit Dome; 17,927	46–32
79	April 8	San Antonio	W 122–117	Norman Powell (25)	Ivica Zubac (20)	James Harden (12)	Intuit Dome; 17,927	47–32
80	April 9	Houston	W 134–117	James Harden (35)	Ivica Zubac (11)	Harden, Zubac (10)	Intuit Dome; 17,927	48–32
81	April 11	@ Sacramento	W 101–100	Kawhi Leonard (28)	Harden, Zubac (11)	James Harden (10)	Golden 1 Center; 16,435	49–32
82	April 13	@ Golden State	W 124–119 (OT)	James Harden (39)	Ivica Zubac (17)	James Harden (10)	Chase Center; 18,864	50–32

2024–25 season schedule

=== Playoffs ===
2025 playoff game log
Total: 3–4 (home: 2–1; road: 1–3)
First round: 3–4 (home: 2–1; road: 1–3)

Game	Date	Team	Score	High points	High rebounds	High assists	Location Attendance	Series
1	April 19	@ Denver	L 110–112 (OT)	James Harden (32)	Ivica Zubac (13)	James Harden (11)	Ball Arena; 19,973	0–1
2	April 21	@ Denver	W 105–102	Kawhi Leonard (39)	Ivica Zubac (12)	James Harden (7)	Ball Arena; 19,989	1–1
3	April 24	Denver	W 117–83	Kawhi Leonard (21)	Kawhi Leonard (11)	James Harden (9)	Intuit Dome; 17,927	2–1
4	April 26	Denver	L 99–101	Kawhi Leonard (24)	Ivica Zubac (12)	James Harden (11)	Intuit Dome; 17,927	2–2
5	April 29	@ Denver	L 115–131	Ivica Zubac (27)	Kawhi Leonard (9)	Kawhi Leonard (11)	Ball Arena; 20,005	2–3
6	May 1	Denver	W 111–105	James Harden (28)	Kawhi Leonard (10)	James Harden (8)	Intuit Dome; 17,927	3–3
7	May 3	@ Denver	L 101–120	Kawhi Leonard (22)	Ivica Zubac (14)	James Harden (13)	Ball Arena; 19,995	3–4

2025 playoff schedule

=== NBA Cup ===
The groups were revealed during the tournament announcement on July 12, 2024.

==== West Group A ====
Pos	Team	Pld	W	L	PF	PA	PD	Qualification
1	Houston Rockets	4	3	1	454	414	+40	Advance to knockout stage
2	Los Angeles Clippers	4	2	2	427	411	+16	
3	Minnesota Timberwolves	4	2	2	418	431	−13	
4	Portland Trail Blazers	4	2	2	430	457	−27	
5	Sacramento Kings	4	1	3	429	445	−16	

Source: NBA
Rules for classification: Tiebreakers

== Player statistics ==
Legend
GP	Games played	GS	Games started	MPG	Minutes per game
FG%	Field-goal percentage	3P%	3-point field-goal percentage	FT%	Free-throw percentage
RPG	Rebounds per game	APG	Assists per game	SPG	Steals per game
BPG	Blocks per game	PPG	Points per game

=== Regular season ===
Player	GP	GS	MPG	FG%	3P%	FT%	RPG	APG	SPG	BPG	PPG
Patrick Baldwin Jr.^{†}	2	0	3.0	1.000	1.000	–	1.5	.5	.0	.0	3.0
Mo Bamba^{†}	28	2	12.6	.466	.300	.680	4.3	.6	.3	1.0	4.6
Nicolas Batum	78	8	17.5	.437	.433	.810	2.8	1.1	.7	.5	4.0
MarJon Beauchamp^{†}	3	0	5.7	.571	.667	.500	1.0	.7	.0	.0	4.0
Bogdan Bogdanović^{†}	30	4	25.0	.474	.427	.875	3.1	3.2	.7	.2	11.4
Kobe Brown	40	0	6.8	.458	.231	.714	1.6	.6	.2	.1	1.9
Cam Christie	13	0	4.5	.292	.154	.500	.9	.5	.4	.1	1.4
Amir Coffey	72	13	24.3	.471	.409	.891	2.2	1.1	.6	.1	9.7
Kris Dunn	74	58	24.1	.439	.335	.682	3.4	2.8	1.7	.4	6.4
Drew Eubanks^{†}	24	0	7.4	.551	.000	.786	2.4	.4	.1	.3	2.7
Trentyn Flowers	6	0	4.5	.364	.000	1.000	.7	.0	.0	.0	1.8
James Harden	79	79	35.3	.410	.352	.874	5.8	8.7	1.5	.7	22.8
Bones Hyland^{†}	20	0	11.1	.391	.388	.885	1.2	1.4	.9	.2	7.2
Kai Jones^{†}	28	0	7.4	.722	.000	.750	1.6	.4	.2	.5	2.2
Derrick Jones Jr.	77	55	24.3	.526	.356	.703	3.4	.8	1.0	.4	10.1
Kawhi Leonard	37	37	31.9	.498	.411	.810	5.9	3.1	1.6	.5	21.5
Terance Mann^{†}	37	12	19.8	.446	.347	.719	2.9	1.6	.8	.3	6.0
Jordan Miller	37	0	11.4	.433	.211	.800	1.6	.9	.5	.1	4.1
Patty Mills^{†}	12	0	5.1	.500	.500	.889	.1	.4	.1	.0	3.1
Kevin Porter Jr.^{†}	45	2	19.6	.423	.245	.645	3.6	3.2	1.0	.2	9.3
Norman Powell	60	60	32.6	.484	.418	.804	3.2	2.1	1.2	.2	21.8
Ben Simmons^{†}	18	0	16.4	.434	–	.857	3.8	3.1	.7	.4	2.9
Ivica Zubac	80	80	32.8	.628	–	.661	12.6	2.7	.7	1.1	16.8

=== Playoffs ===
Player	GP	GS	MPG	FG%	3P%	FT%	RPG	APG	SPG	BPG	PPG
Nicolas Batum	7	0	24.6	.394	.394	–	3.9	2.0	.9	1.7	5.6
Bogdan Bogdanović	7	0	16.7	.364	.292	.857	2.9	2.1	.4	.0	6.4
Kobe Brown	3	0	5.0	.875	1.000	1.000	.3	1.3	.0	.0	5.3
Cam Christie	3	0	4.3	.667	.500	–	.7	.0	.3	.0	1.7
Kris Dunn	7	6	21.9	.386	.357	–	3.4	1.3	1.1	.6	6.3
Drew Eubanks	3	0	4.3	.000	–	.667	.3	.0	.0	.0	1.3
James Harden	7	7	39.4	.436	.364	.818	5.4	9.1	1.3	1.0	18.7
Derrick Jones Jr.	7	1	18.4	.438	.300	.375	1.9	.3	.6	1.3	7.3
Kawhi Leonard	7	7	37.9	.537	.405	.778	7.6	4.1	1.1	.7	25.0
Jordan Miller	3	0	4.3	.429	.000	.500	.7	1.3	1.0	.0	2.3
Patty Mills	1	0	4.0	.500	1.000	–	.0	.0	.0	.0	3.0
Norman Powell	7	7	34.0	.472	.350	.778	2.4	2.4	1.1	.3	16.0
Ben Simmons	5	0	8.4	.333	–	–	1.4	.8	.2	.8	.8
Ivica Zubac	7	7	36.6	.659	–	.538	10.1	2.3	.7	1.0	17.4

- ^{†} Denotes player spent time with another team in the season. Stats reflect time with the Clippers only.

== Transactions ==
=== Trades ===
July 18, 2024	To Los Angeles Clippers Kris Dunn (sign-and-trade)	To Utah Jazz Russell Westbrook; 2030 second-round pick swap right Draft rights to Balša Koprivica; Cash considerations
February 1, 2025	To Los Angeles Clippers Drew Eubanks; Patty Mills	To Utah Jazz Mo Bamba; P.J. Tucker; 2030 LAC second-round pick Cash considerations
February 6, 2025	To Los Angeles Clippers Bogdan Bogdanovic; 2025 MIN second-round pick 2026 MEM second-round pick 2027 LAC second-round pick	To Atlanta Hawks Bones Hyland; Terance Mann
February 6, 2025	To Los Angeles Clippers MarJon Beauchamp	To Milwaukee Bucks Kevin Porter Jr.

=== Free agency ===
==== Re-signed ====
Date	Player	Ref.
July 9	Kai Jones	
July 10	James Harden	
March 1	Jordan Miller (4-year contract)	

==== Additions ====
Date	Player	Former team	Ref.
July 6	Mo Bamba	Philadelphia 76ers	
July 10	Nicolas Batum	Philadelphia 76ers	
July 10	Derrick Jones Jr.	Dallas Mavericks	
July 10	Kevin Porter Jr.	(Greece) PAOK B.C.	
July 24	Trentyn Flowers (Two-way contract)	(Australia) Adelaide 36ers	
February 10	Ben Simmons	Brooklyn Nets	
March 1	Patrick Baldwin Jr. (Two-way contract)	San Diego Clippers	
March 1	Seth Lundy (Two-way contract)	College Park Skyhawks	

==== Subtractions ====
Date	Player	Reason left	New team(s)	Ref.
July 5	Mason Plumlee	Free agency	Phoenix Suns	
July 6	Paul George	Free agency	Philadelphia 76ers	
July 9	Daniel Theis	Free agency	New Orleans Pelicans	
July 31	Moussa Diabaté	Free agency	Charlotte Hornets	
August 2	Xavier Moon	Free agency	(Russia) Zenit Saint Petersburg	
August 8	Brandon Boston Jr.	Free agency	San Antonio Spurs	
March 1	Kai Jones	Waived	Dallas Mavericks	
March 1	MarJon Beauchamp	Waived	New York Knicks	
