= 2024–25 Dallas Mavericks season =

2024–25 NBA season by team

- Head coach: Jason Kidd
- President: Nico Harrison
- General manager: Nico Harrison
- Owner(s): Miriam Adelson and Patrick Dumont (majority); Mark Cuban (minority)
- Arena: American Airlines Center

Results
- Record: 39–43 (.476)
- Place: Division: 3rd (Southwest); Conference: 10th (Western)
- Playoff finish: Did not qualify
- Stats at Basketball Reference

Local media
- Television: TEGNA Inc. (Note: Affiliates all within the state of Texas include: WFAA (Dallas/Fort Worth) KFAA-TV (Dallas/Decatur/Fort Worth) KCEN (Killeen/Temple/Waco) KAGS-LD (Bryan/College Station) KYTX (Jacksonville/Longview/Lufkin/Nacogdoches/Tyler) KWES-TV (Midland/Odessa) KXVA (Abilene) KIDY (San Angelo))
- Radio: KEGL

The 2024–25 Dallas Mavericks season was the 45th season for the franchise in the National Basketball Association (NBA). The Mavericks would look to return to the NBA Finals following their 4–1 defeat to the championship winning Boston Celtics. On July 6, 2024, the Mavericks would complete a six-team sign-and-trade that saw them acquire four-time champion shooting guard Klay Thompson from the Golden State Warriors, breaking apart the Splash Brothers duo there in the process after 13 seasons. Before this season began, the Mavericks would also leave Bally Sports Southwest (later rebranded to FanDuel Sports Network Southwest as of October 21, 2024) in order to air games with TEGNA Inc. owned stations within the state of Texas.

In the 2024 NBA Cup, the Mavericks finished with a group stage record of 3–1 and advanced to the knockout stage as the West wildcard by winning a point-differential tiebreaker over the Phoenix Suns, after a head-to-head tiebreaker loss to the Golden State Warriors relegated them to second place in West Group C. However, they were eliminated by the Oklahoma City Thunder in the quarterfinals.

On February 2, 2025, without warning, the Mavericks sent franchise superstar and perennial MVP candidate Luka Dončić, alongside Maxi Kleber and Markieff Morris, to the Los Angeles Lakers in a controversial blockbuster trade, in return for Anthony Davis, Max Christie, and a first-round pick. General manager Nico Harrison stated that the trade was meant to improve the team's defense, though it was leaked that the real reasons for the trade were Harrison's disapproval of Dončić's weight, and ownership's reluctance to pay Dončić the raise he would be owed soon, with Dončić being eligible for the super-max contract at the time and it being reported that he was reaching 270 pounds (120 kg) before the trade occurred. Regardless of the reasoning, Mavericks fans immediately decried the inexplicable trade of their beloved franchise player for an inferior and injury-prone Davis, and demanded the team fire Harrison as general manager. The move was considered by many outlets to be the most shocking and possibly worst of all time in sports history.

Davis suffered an adductor injury in his debut for the Mavericks on February 8, causing him to miss extended time and further fueling the rage of fans, who felt Harrison should have known Davis could not stay healthy and had essentially given away Dončić for nothing. Davis was out injured multiple times afterward, only playing a total of nine games for the Mavericks that season. Kyrie Irving also suffered a season-ending torn ACL on March 3, while several other Mavericks players were sidelined with injuries. By March 15, only eight players were considered healthy enough to play, which was the bare minimum number of players an NBA team is required to have active for games. Just two days after the Dončić trade, the Mavs sent Quentin Grimes to the Philadelphia 76ers for Caleb Martin. These events led to a large amount of backlash from the fanbase, largely toward Nico Harrison and Patrick Dumont. The hate was so intense that fans began chanting hateful comments towards the staff and the team had to hire extra security to escort fans out of the home arena, with Harrison's personal information also being leaked online. Many NBA fans called the 2024–25 Mavericks season one of the saddest seasons across professional sports history, and some believed the team was cursed.

On April 9, the Mavericks became the last Western Conference team to clinch a play-in spot following the Oklahoma City Thunder defeating the Phoenix Suns. They would win their first game on April 16 before falling to the Memphis Grizzlies in the second play-in game on April 18, ending their season and missing the playoffs for the first time since the 2022–23 season. They were also the first team since the 2019–20 Golden State Warriors to miss the playoffs after reaching the Finals the previous season.

Despite only having a 1.8% chance to receive the first overall pick in the 2025 NBA draft, they won the NBA draft lottery, becoming the second straight team to qualify for postseason play (by playing in the NBA play-in tournament) and win the draft lottery, after the 2023–24 Atlanta Hawks. Part of their break came from winning a coin flip over the Chicago Bulls that resulted in them staying at what would have initially been the eleventh pick in the draft before they won the lottery. The #1 pick allowed them to draft Cooper Flagg, who was ranked as a top prospect.

== Draft ==
Round	Pick	Player	Position(s)	Nationality	College / Club
2	58	Ariel Hukporti	C	Germany	MHP Riesen Ludwigsburg (Germany)

The Mavericks entered this draft with a second-round pick, which they acquired from the Charlotte Hornets in 2024 and is originally owned by the Boston Celtics. They had traded their 2024 first-round pick in 2019 to the New York Knicks as an exchange for Kristaps Porziņģis and their original 2024 second-round pick to the Sacramento Kings to acquire the draft rights to Jaden Hardy in 2022 before being used by Boston in the draft.

The Mavericks used their only selection to draft Hukporti, who would then be traded on draft day to New York with the draft rights to Petteri Koponen (who had previously retired from playing professional basketball in 2022 due to hip concerns) and cash considerations in exchange for the draft rights to Melvin Ajinça.

== Roster ==
2024–25 Dallas Mavericks roster
Players

Pos.	No.	Player	Height	Weight	DOB	From
G	00	Max Christie	6 ft 5 in (1.96 m)	190 lb (86 kg)	2003-02-10	Michigan State
F/C	3	Anthony Davis	6 ft 10 in (2.08 m)	253 lb (115 kg)	1993-03-11	Kentucky
G	26	Spencer Dinwiddie	6 ft 5 in (1.96 m)	215 lb (98 kg)	1993-04-06	Colorado
F	20	Kessler Edwards (TW)	6 ft 7 in (2.01 m)	203 lb (92 kg)	2000-08-09	Pepperdine
G	0	Danté Exum (injured)	6 ft 5 in (1.96 m)	214 lb (97 kg)	1995-07-13	Australia
C	21	Daniel Gafford	6 ft 10 in (2.08 m)	265 lb (120 kg)	1998-10-01	Arkansas
G	1	Jaden Hardy	6 ft 3 in (1.91 m)	198 lb (90 kg)	2002-07-05	Coronado HS (NV)
G	11	Kyrie Irving (injured)	6 ft 2 in (1.88 m)	195 lb (88 kg)	1992-03-23	Duke
F/C	23	Kai Jones (TW)	6 ft 11 in (2.11 m)	221 lb (100 kg)	2001-01-19	Texas
C	2	Dereck Lively II	7 ft 1 in (2.16 m)	230 lb (104 kg)	2004-02-12	Duke
F	13	Naji Marshall	6 ft 6 in (1.98 m)	220 lb (100 kg)	1998-01-24	Xavier
F	16	Caleb Martin	6 ft 5 in (1.96 m)	205 lb (93 kg)	1995-09-28	Nevada
F/C	7	Dwight Powell	6 ft 10 in (2.08 m)	240 lb (109 kg)	1991-07-20	Stanford
F	8	Olivier-Maxence Prosper (injured)	6 ft 7 in (2.01 m)	230 lb (104 kg)	2002-07-03	Marquette
G/F	31	Klay Thompson	6 ft 5 in (1.96 m)	220 lb (100 kg)	1990-02-08	Washington State
F	25	P. J. Washington	6 ft 7 in (2.01 m)	230 lb (104 kg)	1998-08-23	Kentucky
G	10	Brandon Williams	6 ft 1 in (1.85 m)	190 lb (86 kg)	1999-11-22	Arizona

Coaches
Head coach
- Jason Kidd
Assistant(s)
- Darrell Armstrong
- Josh Broghamer
- Jared Dudley
- Eric Hughes
- Alex Jensen
- God Shammgod
- Sean Sweeney
- Keith Veney

Legend
- (DP) Unsigned draft pick
- (FA) Free agent
- (S) Suspended
- (GL) On assignment to G League affiliate
- (TW) Two-way affiliate player
- Injured

Roster
Updated: March 2, 2025

== Standings ==
=== Division ===
Southwest Division	W	L	PCT	GB	Home	Road	Div	GP
y – Houston Rockets	52	30	.634	–	29‍–‍12	23‍–‍18	13‍–‍3	82
x – Memphis Grizzlies	48	34	.585	4.0	26‍–‍15	22‍–‍19	11‍–‍5	82
pi – Dallas Mavericks	39	43	.476	13.0	22‍–‍18	17‍–‍25	8‍–‍8	82
San Antonio Spurs	34	48	.415	18.0	20‍–‍21	14‍–‍27	5‍–‍11	82
New Orleans Pelicans	21	61	.256	31.0	14‍–‍27	7‍–‍34	3‍–‍13	82

=== Conference ===
Western Conference
#	Team	W	L	PCT	GB	GP
1	z – Oklahoma City Thunder *	68	14	.829	–	82
2	y – Houston Rockets *	52	30	.634	16.0	82
3	y – Los Angeles Lakers *	50	32	.610	18.0	82
4	x – Denver Nuggets	50	32	.610	18.0	82
5	x – Los Angeles Clippers	50	32	.610	18.0	82
6	x – Minnesota Timberwolves	49	33	.598	19.0	82
7	x – Golden State Warriors	48	34	.585	20.0	82
8	x – Memphis Grizzlies	48	34	.585	20.0	82
9	pi – Sacramento Kings	40	42	.488	28.0	82
10	pi – Dallas Mavericks	39	43	.476	29.0	82
11	Phoenix Suns	36	46	.439	32.0	82
12	Portland Trail Blazers	36	46	.439	32.0	82
13	San Antonio Spurs	34	48	.415	34.0	82
14	New Orleans Pelicans	21	61	.256	47.0	82
15	Utah Jazz	17	65	.207	51.0	82

== Game log ==
=== Preseason ===
2024 preseason game log
Total: 1–3 (Home: 1–2; Road: 0–1)
Preseason: 1–3 (home: 1–2; road: 0–1)

Game	Date	Team	Score	High points	High rebounds	High assists	Location Attendance	Record
1	October 7	Memphis	L 116–121	Jaden Hardy (21)	Naji Marshall (6)	Jaden Hardy (8)	American Airlines Center; 19,207	0–1
2	October 10	Utah	L 107–112	Daniel Gafford (15)	Olivier-Maxence Prosper (10)	Jaden Hardy (4)	American Airlines Center; 19,210	0–2
3	October 14	@ L.A. Clippers	L 96–110	Quentin Grimes (20)	Gafford, Lively II (7)	Dereck Lively II (5)	Intuit Dome; 13,400	0–3
4	October 17	Milwaukee	W 109–84	Kyrie Irving (14)	Quentin Grimes (10)	Quentin Grimes (4)	American Airlines Center; 19,217	1–3

2024–25 preseason schedule

=== Regular season ===
The schedule was announced on August 15, 2024.

2024–25 game log
Total: 39–43 (Home: 22–18; Road: 17–25)
October: 3–2 (home: 2–1; road: 1–1)

Game	Date	Team	Score	High points	High rebounds	High assists	Location Attendance	Record
1	October 24	San Antonio	W 120–109	Luka Dončić (28)	Dereck Lively II (11)	Luka Dončić (8)	American Airlines Center; 20,373	1–0
2	October 26	@ Phoenix	L 102–114	Luka Dončić (40)	Dereck Lively II (11)	Kyrie Irving (5)	Footprint Center; 17,071	1–1
3	October 28	Utah	W 110–102	Kyrie Irving (23)	P. J. Washington (11)	Kyrie Irving (9)	American Airlines Center; 19,811	2–1
4	October 29	@ Minnesota	W 120–114	Kyrie Irving (35)	Dereck Lively II (9)	Luka Dončić (8)	Target Center; 18,978	3–1
5	October 31	Houston	L 102–108	Luka Dončić (29)	P. J. Washington (9)	Kyrie Irving (7)	American Airlines Center; 20,011	3–2

November : 9–6 (home: 5–2; road: 4–4)

Game	Date	Team	Score	High points	High rebounds	High assists	Location Attendance	Record
6	November 3	Orlando	W 108–85	Luka Dončić (32)	Dereck Lively II (11)	Luka Dončić (7)	American Airlines Center; 19,977	4–2
7	November 4	Indiana	L 127–134	Luka Dončić (34)	P. J. Washington (11)	Luka Dončić (15)	American Airlines Center; 19,613	4–3
8	November 6	Chicago	W 119–99	Luka Dončić (27)	Dončić, Gafford (7)	Luka Dončić (13)	American Airlines Center; 20,011	5–3
9	November 8	Phoenix	L 113–114	Luka Dončić (30)	three players (7)	Luka Dončić (7)	American Airlines Center; 20,277	5–4
10	November 10	@ Denver	L 120–122	Kyrie Irving (43)	Luka Dončić (9)	Luka Dončić (9)	Ball Arena; 19,908	5–5
11	November 12	@ Golden State	L 117–120	Luka Dončić (31)	Dončić, Lively II (8)	Dončić, Irving (6)	Chase Center; 18,064	5–6
12	November 14	@ Utah	L 113–115	Luka Dončić (37)	Luka Dončić (7)	Luka Dončić (9)	Delta Center; 18,175	5–7
13	November 16	San Antonio	W 110–93	Gafford, Irving (22)	Kyrie Irving (8)	Dončić, Irving (6)	American Airlines Center; 20,311	6–7
14	November 17	@ Oklahoma City	W 121–119	P. J. Washington (27)	P. J. Washington (17)	Kyrie Irving (6)	Paycom Center; 18,203	7–7
15	November 19	New Orleans	W 132–91	Luka Dončić (26)	Quentin Grimes (8)	Kyrie Irving (7)	American Airlines Center; 20,077	8–7
16	November 22	@ Denver	W 123–120	Naji Marshall (26)	P. J. Washington (13)	Kyrie Irving (6)	Ball Arena; 19,923	9–7
17	November 24	@ Miami	L 118–123 (OT)	Kyrie Irving (27)	Dereck Lively II (13)	Spencer Dinwiddie (7)	Kaseya Center; 19,714	9–8
18	November 25	@ Atlanta	W 129–119	Kyrie Irving (32)	P. J. Washington (10)	Kyrie Irving (6)	State Farm Arena; 17,186	10–8
19	November 27	New York	W 129–114	Naji Marshall (24)	P. J. Washington (10)	Spencer Dinwiddie (9)	American Airlines Center; 20,413	11–8
20	November 30	@ Utah	W 106–94	Kyrie Irving (30)	Gafford, Washington (11)	Spencer Dinwiddie (10)	Delta Center; 18,175	12–8

December: 8–5 (home: 3–2; road: 5–3)

Game	Date	Team	Score	High points	High rebounds	High assists	Location Attendance	Record
21	December 1	@ Portland	W 137–131	Luka Dončić (36)	Dončić, Kleber (7)	Luka Dončić (13)	Moda Center; 16,205	13–8
22	December 3	Memphis	W 121–116	Luka Dončić (37)	Luka Dončić (12)	P. J. Washington (7)	American Airlines Center; 20,277	14–8
23	December 5	@ Washington	W 137–101	Kyrie Irving (25)	Dereck Lively II (11)	Luka Dončić (10)	Capital One Arena; 15,921	15–8
24	December 7	@ Toronto	W 125–118	Luka Dončić (30)	Luka Dončić (13)	Luka Dončić (11)	Scotiabank Arena; 19,625	16–8
25	December 10	@ Oklahoma City	L 104–118	Marshall, Thompson (19)	Dereck Lively II (13)	three players (5)	Paycom Center; 17,724	16–9
26	December 15	@ Golden State	W 143–133	Luka Dončić (45)	Luka Dončić (11)	Luka Dončić (13)	Chase Center; 18,064	17–9
27	December 19	L.A. Clippers	L 95–118	Klay Thompson (22)	P. J. Washington (9)	Spencer Dinwiddie (7)	American Airlines Center; 20,044	17–10
28	December 21	L.A. Clippers	W 113–97	Quentin Grimes (20)	Dereck Lively II (11)	Dinwiddie, Irving (6)	American Airlines Center; 20,102	18–10
29	December 23	Portland	W 132–108	Luka Dončić (27)	Luka Dončić (7)	Luka Dončić (7)	American Airlines Center; 20,225	19–10
30	December 25	Minnesota	L 99–105	Kyrie Irving (39)	Dereck Lively II (10)	Dereck Lively II (3)	American Airlines Center; 20,341	19–11
31	December 27	@ Phoenix	W 98–89	Kyrie Irving (20)	Maxi Kleber (7)	Irving, Thompson (5)	Footprint Center; 17,071	20–11
32	December 28	@ Portland	L 122–126	Kyrie Irving (46)	Daniel Gafford (9)	Maxi Kleber (5)	Moda Center; 19,335	20–12
33	December 30	@ Sacramento	L 100–110	Spencer Dinwiddie (30)	Quentin Grimes (7)	Spencer Dinwiddie (6)	Golden 1 Center; 19,335	20–13

January: 6–10 (home: 4–5; road: 2–5)

Game	Date	Team	Score	High points	High rebounds	High assists	Location Attendance	Record
34	January 1	@ Houston	L 99–110	Quentin Grimes (17)	Kyrie Irving (7)	Dereck Lively II (6)	Toyota Center; 18,055	20–14
35	January 3	Cleveland	L 122–134	Quentin Grimes (26)	Dereck Lively II (11)	Quentin Grimes (6)	American Airlines Center; 20,231	20–15
36	January 6	@ Memphis	L 104–119	P. J. Washington (17)	Dereck Lively II (12)	Quentin Grimes (6)	FedExForum; 16,412	20–16
37	January 7	L.A. Lakers	W 118–97	Quentin Grimes (23)	Quentin Grimes (9)	Spencer Dinwiddie (8)	American Airlines Center; 20,126	21–16
38	January 9	Portland	W 117–111	Jaden Hardy (25)	Dereck Lively II (16)	Spencer Dinwiddie (5)	American Airlines Center; 19,241	22–16
39	January 12	Denver	L 101–112	Klay Thompson (25)	three players (6)	Spencer Dinwiddie (10)	American Airlines Center; 20,031	22–17
40	January 14	Denver	L 99–118	Daniel Gafford (13)	P. J. Washington (8)	Quentin Grimes (5)	American Airlines Center; 19,798	22–18
41	January 15	@ New Orleans	L 116–119	Daniel Gafford (27)	P. J. Washington (14)	Naji Marshall (10)	Smoothie King Center; 16,488	22–19
42	January 17	Oklahoma City	W 106–98	Kyrie Irving (25)	Naji Marshall (10)	Irving, Washington (5)	American Airlines Center; 20,311	23–19
43	January 20	@ Charlotte	L 105–110	Kyrie Irving (33)	Daniel Gafford (15)	Naji Marshall (4)	Spectrum Center; 19,314	23–20
44	January 22	Minnesota	L 114–115	Kyrie Irving (36)	Daniel Gafford (12)	Kyrie Irving (9)	American Airlines Center; 20,025	23–21
45	January 23	@ Oklahoma City	W 121–115	Spencer Dinwiddie (28)	P. J. Washington (19)	Irving, Kleber (4)	Paycom Center; 18,203	24–21
46	January 25	Boston	L 107–122	Kyrie Irving (22)	Daniel Gafford (15)	Kyrie Irving (5)	American Airlines Center; 20,421	24–22
47	January 27	Washington	W 130–108	Klay Thompson (23)	P. J. Washington (9)	Spencer Dinwiddie (9)	American Airlines Center; 20,031	25–22
48	January 29	@ New Orleans	W 137–136	Irving, Washington (25)	P. J. Washington (14)	P. J. Washington (8)	Smoothie King Center; 15,656	26–22
49	January 31	@ Detroit	L 102–117	Kyrie Irving (28)	P. J. Washington (13)	Dinwiddie, Thompson (4)	Little Caesars Arena; 20,062	26–23

February: 6–5 (home: 5–1; road: 1–4)

Game	Date	Team	Score	High points	High rebounds	High assists	Location Attendance	Record
50	February 2	@ Cleveland	L 101–144	Jaden Hardy (21)	Kylor Kelley (11)	Olivier-Maxence Prosper (4)	Rocket Mortgage FieldHouse; 19,432	26–24
51	February 4	@ Philadelphia	L 116–118	Kyrie Irving (34)	Christie, Irving (9)	Spencer Dinwiddie (7)	Wells Fargo Center; 19,756	26–25
52	February 6	@ Boston	W 127–120	Klay Thompson (25)	Daniel Gafford (15)	Exum, Gafford (5)	TD Garden; 19,156	27–25
53	February 8	Houston	W 116–105	Anthony Davis (26)	Anthony Davis (16)	Anthony Davis (7)	American Airlines Center; 20,303	28–25
54	February 10	Sacramento	L 128–129 (OT)	Kyrie Irving (30)	Kyrie Irving (9)	Kyrie Irving (7)	American Airlines Center; 19,726	28–26
55	February 12	Golden State	W 111–107	Kyrie Irving (42)	Naji Marshall (8)	Edwards, Prosper (6)	American Airlines Center; 20,311	29–26
56	February 13	Miami	W 118–113	Danté Exum (27)	Edwards, Marshall (9)	Spencer Dinwiddie (6)	American Airlines Center; 19,935	30–26
All-Star Game
57	February 21	New Orleans	W 111–103	Kyrie Irving (35)	Naji Marshall (10)	Spencer Dinwiddie (7)	American Airlines Center; 20,125	31–26
58	February 23	@ Golden State	L 102–126	Irving, Washington (17)	Kessler Edwards (8)	Danté Exum (5)	Chase Center; 18,064	31–27
59	February 25	@ L.A. Lakers	L 99–107	Kyrie Irving (35)	P. J. Washington (10)	Max Christie (6)	Crypto.com Arena; 18,997	31–28
60	February 27	Charlotte	W 103–96	Kyrie Irving (25)	Moses Brown (11)	Naji Marshall (6)	American Airlines Center; 20,009	32–28

March: 5–11 (home: 1–6; road: 4–5)

Game	Date	Team	Score	High points	High rebounds	High assists	Location Attendance	Record
61	March 1	Milwaukee	L 117–132	Kyrie Irving (31)	Moses Brown (9)	Klay Thompson (5)	American Airlines Center; 20,272	32–29
62	March 3	Sacramento	L 98–122	Kai Jones (21)	Kai Jones (8)	Dinwiddie, Marshall (6)	American Airlines Center; 19,711	32–30
63	March 5	@ Milwaukee	L 107–137	Klay Thompson (28)	Naji Marshall (11)	Brandon Williams (8)	Fiserv Forum; 17,341	32–31
64	March 7	Memphis	L 111–122	Brandon Williams (31)	Naji Marshall (17)	Brandon Williams (6)	American Airlines Center; 20,010	32–32
65	March 9	Phoenix	L 116–125	Naji Marshall (34)	Naji Marshall (9)	Naji Marshall (10)	American Airlines Center; 20,013	32–33
66	March 10	@ San Antonio	W 133–129	Spencer Dinwiddie (28)	Kessler Edwards (11)	Spencer Dinwiddie (6)	Frost Bank Center; 17,735	33–33
67	March 12	@ San Antonio	L 116–126	Brandon Williams (19)	four players (4)	Klay Thompson (7)	Frost Bank Center; 18,354	33–34
68	March 14	@ Houston	L 96–133	Brandon Williams (25)	Klay Thompson (9)	Marshall, Thompson (3)	Toyota Center; 16,612	33–35
69	March 16	Philadelphia	L 125–130	P. J. Washington (29)	P. J. Washington (12)	Spencer Dinwiddie (7)	American Airlines Center; 19,825	33–36
70	March 19	@ Indiana	L 131–135	P. J. Washington (26)	Kai Jones (11)	Spencer Dinwiddie (12)	Gainbridge Fieldhouse; 15,078	33–37
71	March 21	Detroit	W 123–117	Spencer Dinwiddie (31)	Naji Marshall (11)	Spencer Dinwiddie (7)	American Airlines Center; 20,071	34–37
72	March 24	@ Brooklyn	W 120–101	Naji Marshall (22)	Kai Jones (9)	Spencer Dinwiddie (12)	Barclays Center; 16,434	35–37
73	March 25	@ New York	L 113–128	Naji Marshall (38)	Kai Jones (8)	Spencer Dinwiddie (7)	Madison Square Garden; 19,812	35–38
74	March 27	@ Orlando	W 101–92	Jaden Hardy (22)	Anthony Davis (7)	Brandon Williams (6)	Kia Center; 17,269	36–38
75	March 29	@ Chicago	W 120–119	Klay Thompson (20)	Spencer Dinwiddie (8)	Spencer Dinwiddie (11)	United Center; 21,045	37–38
76	March 31	Brooklyn	L 109–113	Daniel Gafford (17)	Naji Marshall (8)	Spencer Dinwiddie (8)	American Airlines Center; 19,790	37–39

April: 2–4 (home: 2–1; road: 0–3)

Game	Date	Team	Score	High points	High rebounds	High assists	Location Attendance	Record
77	April 2	Atlanta	W 120–118	Anthony Davis (34)	Anthony Davis (15)	Spencer Dinwiddie (10)	American Airlines Center; 19,977	38–39
78	April 4	@ L.A. Clippers	L 91–114	Naji Marshall (22)	P. J. Washington (10)	Jaden Hardy (5)	Intuit Dome; 17,927	38–40
79	April 5	@ L.A. Clippers	L 104–135	Anthony Davis (27)	Anthony Davis (9)	Spencer Dinwiddie (9)	Intuit Dome; 17,927	38–41
80	April 9	L.A. Lakers	L 97–112	Naji Marshall (23)	Anthony Davis (11)	Naji Marshall (8)	American Airlines Center; 20,841	38–42
81	April 11	Toronto	W 124–102	Anthony Davis (23)	Anthony Davis (13)	Anthony Davis (10)	American Airlines Center; 20,177	39–42
82	April 13	@ Memphis	L 97–132	Daniel Gafford (20)	Kai Jones (8)	Spencer Dinwiddie (7)	FedExForum; 17,794	39–43

2024–25 season schedule

=== Play-in ===
2025 play-in game log
Total: 1–1 (Home: 0–0; Road: 1–1)
Play-in: 1–1 (home: 0–0; road: 1–1)

Game	Date	Team	Score	High points	High rebounds	High assists	Location Attendance	Record
1	April 16	@ Sacramento	W 120–106	Anthony Davis (27)	Davis, Washington (9)	Danté Exum (6)	Golden 1 Center; 17,939	1–0
2	April 18	@ Memphis	L 106–120	Anthony Davis (40)	Anthony Davis (9)	Brandon Williams (7)	FedExForum; 17,794	1–1

2024–25 season schedule

=== NBA Cup ===
The groups were revealed during the tournament announcement on July 12, 2024. The matchups were revealed on August 13, 2024.

==== West Group C ====
Pos	Team	Pld	W	L	PF	PA	PD	Qualification
1	Golden State Warriors	4	3	1	470	462	+8	Advance to knockout stage
2	Dallas Mavericks	4	3	1	493	447	+46	Advance to knockout stage
3	Denver Nuggets	4	2	2	455	449	+6	
4	Memphis Grizzlies	4	1	3	464	475	−11	
5	New Orleans Pelicans	4	1	3	409	458	−49	

Source: NBA
Rules for classification: Tiebreakers

2024–25 game log
Total: 3–2 (Home: 2–0; Road: 1–2)
NBA Cup: 3–2 (home: 2–0; road: 1–2)

Game	Date	Team	Score	High points	High rebounds	High assists	Location Attendance	Record
1	November 12	@ Golden State	L 117–120	Luka Dončić (31)	Dončić, Lively II (8)	Dončić, Irving (6)	Chase Center; 18,064	0–1
2	November 19	New Orleans	W 132–91	Luka Dončić (26)	Quentin Grimes (8)	Kyrie Irving (7)	American Airlines Center; 20,077	1–1
3	November 22	@ Denver	W 123–120	Naji Marshall (26)	P. J. Washington (13)	Kyrie Irving (6)	Ball Arena; 19,923	2–1
4	December 3	Memphis	W 121–116	Luka Dončić (37)	Luka Dončić (12)	P. J. Washington (7)	American Airlines Center; 20,277	3–1
5	December 10	@ Oklahoma City	L 104–118	Marshall, Thompson (19)	Dereck Lively II (13)	three players (5)	Paycom Center; 17,724	3–2

== Player statistics ==
Legend
GP	Games played	GS	Games started	MPG	Minutes per game
FG%	Field-goal percentage	3P%	3-point field-goal percentage	FT%	Free-throw percentage
RPG	Rebounds per game	APG	Assists per game	SPG	Steals per game
BPG	Blocks per game	PPG	Points per game

=== Regular season ===
After all games.

Dallas Mavericks statistics
Player	GP	GS	MPG	FG%	3P%	FT%	RPG	APG	SPG	BPG	PPG
Moses Brown	4	2	18.3	.724	—	.833	7.8	.5	1.0	.8	11.8
Max Christie^{≠}	32	11	30.4	.411	.364	.862	4.2	2.5	.9	.3	11.2
Anthony Davis^{≠}	9	9	29.6	.461	.233	.688	10.1	4.4	.6	2.2	20.0
Spencer Dinwiddie	79	30	27.0	.416	.334	.802	2.6	4.4	.9	.2	11.0
Luka Dončić^{‡}	22	22	35.7	.464	.354	.767	8.3	7.8	2.0	.4	28.1
Kessler Edwards	40	18	15.2	.496	.407	.923	2.9	1.1	.5	.5	4.2
Dante Exum	20	13	18.6	.478	.434	.742	1.7	2.8	.6	.2	8.7
Daniel Gafford	57	31	21.5	.702	—	.689	6.8	1.4	.4	1.8	12.3
Jazian Gortman^{~}	16	0	3.6	.391	.364	.500	.3	.4	.1	.1	1.5
Quentin Grimes^{~}	47	12	22.8	.463	.398	.765	3.8	2.1	.7	.2	10.2
Jaden Hardy	57	3	15.9	.435	.386	.698	1.6	1.4	.5	.1	8.7
Kyrie Irving	50	50	36.1	.473	.401	.916	4.8	4.6	1.3	.5	24.7
Kai Jones^{≠}	12	6	21.7	.836	.333	.700	6.6	1.3	.8	.8	11.4
Kylor Kelley^{≠}	8	1	8.4	.769	—	.667	2.6	.3	.0	.3	3.0
Maxi Kleber^{‡}	34	4	18.7	.385	.265	.762	2.8	1.3	.3	.5	3.0
Dereck Lively II	36	29	23.1	.702	—	.630	7.5	2.4	.6	1.6	8.7
Naji Marshall	69	31	27.8	.508	.275	.813	4.8	3.0	1.0	.2	13.2
Caleb Martin^{≠}	14	0	19.6	.389	.250	.625	2.9	1.9	.9	.2	5.4
Markieff Morris	7	0	5.9	.227	.154	—	1.1	.6	.1	.1	1.7
Dwight Powell	55	3	10.0	.689	.400	.651	2.1	1.0	.3	.4	2.1
Olivier-Maxence Prosper	52	4	11.2	.402	.235	.645	2.4	.8	.5	.1	3.9
Klay Thompson	72	72	27.3	.412	.391	.905	3.4	2.0	.7	.4	14.0
P. J. Washington^{≠}	57	56	32.2	.453	.381	.722	7.8	2.3	1.1	1.1	14.7
Brandon Williams	33	3	14.8	.521	.400	.833	1.8	2.3	.7	.2	8.3

^{‡}Traded during the season
^{≠}Acquired during the season
^{~}Waived during the season

== Transactions ==
=== Trades ===
June 27, 2024
To Dallas Mavericks

Draft rights to Melvin Ajinça (No. 51)
To New York Knicks

Draft rights to Ariel Hukporti (No. 58)
Draft rights to Petteri Koponen (2007 No. 30)
Cash considerations
July 6, 2024
To Dallas Mavericks

Quentin Grimes
To Detroit Pistons

Tim Hardaway Jr.
2025 second-round pick
2028 second-round pick
2028 second-round pick
July 6, 2024
Six-team trade
To Dallas Mavericks

Klay Thompson (from Golden State)
2025 GSW second-round pick (from Golden State)
To Charlotte Hornets

Josh Green (from Dallas)
Reggie Jackson (from Denver)
2029 DEN second-round pick (from Denver)
2030 DEN second-round pick (from Denver)
To Denver Nuggets

Cash considerations (from Charlotte)
To Golden State Warriors

Kyle Anderson (from Minnesota)
Buddy Hield (from Philadelphia)
To Minnesota Timberwolves

2025 DEN second-round pick (from Golden State via Charlotte)
2031 second-round pick swap (from Golden State)
Cash considerations (from Golden State)
To Philadelphia 76ers

2031 DAL second-round pick (from Golden State via Dallas)
February 2, 2025
Three-team trade
To Dallas Mavericks

- Max Christie (from Los Angeles)
- Anthony Davis (from Los Angeles)
- 2029 LAL first-round pick
To Los Angeles Lakers

- Luka Dončić (from Dallas)
- Maxi Kleber (from Dallas)
- Markieff Morris (from Dallas)
To Utah Jazz

- Jalen Hood-Schifino (from Los Angeles)
- 2025 DAL second-round pick (from Dallas)
- 2025 LAC second-round pick (from Los Angeles)
February 4, 2025
To Dallas Mavericks

Caleb Martin
To Philadelphia 76ers

Quentin Grimes
2025 second-round pick

=== Free agency ===
==== Re-signed ====
Player	Signed	Ref.
Brandon Williams	July 12	
Markieff Morris	September 12	

==== Additions ====
Player	Date	Former team	Ref.
Naji Marshall	July 6	New Orleans Pelicans	
Jazian Gortman	July 13	Rip City Remix	
Emanuel Miller	July 13	TCU Horned Frogs	
Spencer Dinwiddie	August 3	Los Angeles Lakers	
Jamarion Sharp	August 3	Ole Miss Rebels	
Kessler Edwards	August 8	Sacramento Kings	
A. J. Lawson	October 11	Dallas Mavericks	
Jamir Chaplin	October 18	Little Rock Trojans	
Jarod Lucas	October 18	Nevada Wolf Pack	
Kylor Kelley	January 25	South Bay Lakers	
Moses Brown	February 20 (10-day)	Westchester Knicks	
Kai Jones	March 3	Los Angeles Clippers	

==== Subtractions ====
Player	Date	New team	Ref.
Derrick Jones Jr.	July 10	Los Angeles Clippers	
Alex Fudge	August 8	South Bay Lakers	
Greg Brown III	September 11	Mexico City Capitanes	
A. J. Lawson	October 8	Dallas Mavericks (TW)	
A. J. Lawson	October 18	Toronto Raptors	
Emanuel Miller	October 18	Texas Legends	
Jamarion Sharp	October 18	Texas Legends	
Jamir Chaplin	October 19		
Jarod Lucas	October 19	Texas Legends	
Jazian Gortman	January 25	Texas Legends	
Kylor Kelley	March 3	South Bay Lakers	

== Awards ==
Player	Award	Date awarded
Luka Dončić	Western Conference Player of the Week	December 2–8,
