= List of NBA regular season individual records =

This article lists all-time individual records achieved in the NBA regular season in major statistical categories recognized by the league, including those set by teams and individuals in a game, season, and career. The NBA also recognizes records from its original incarnation, the Basketball Association of America (BAA).

== Awards ==
- Most total selections to the All-NBA Team

- LeBron James with 21 selections

- Most first-team selections to the All-NBA Team

- LeBron James with 13 selections

- Most MVPs

- Kareem Abdul-Jabbar with 6 selections

- Most total selections to the All-Defensive Team

- Tim Duncan with 15 selections

- Most first-team selections to the All-Defensive Team

- Michael Jordan, Gary Payton, Kevin Garnett and Kobe Bryant with 9 selections

- Most Defensive Player of the Year Awards

- Dikembe Mutombo, Ben Wallace, and Rudy Gobert, tied with 4 selections

- Most Sixth Man of the Year Awards

- Jamal Crawford and Lou Williams, tied with 3 selections

- Most Hustle Awards

- Marcus Smart with 3 selections

- Most Teammate of the Year Awards

- Jrue Holiday with 3 selections

- Most Sportsmanship Awards

- Mike Conley Jr. with 4 selections

- Most Coach of the Year Awards

- Don Nelson, Pat Riley, and Gregg Popovich, tied with 3 selections

- Most Executive of the Year Awards

- Jerry Colangelo, with 4 selections

- Only player to win MVP by a unanimous vote

- Stephen Curry

- Only player to win MVP, Executive of the Year, and Coach of the Year awards

- Larry Bird

- Only players to win Rookie of the Year, Defensive Player of the Year, and MVP awards

- Michael Jordan and David Robinson

- Only players to win Rookie of the Year and MVP in the same season

- Wes Unseld (1968–69) and Wilt Chamberlain (1959–60)

- Only player to win the Scoring Title and Defensive Player of the Year in the same season

- Michael Jordan, 1987–88

- Only players to win Rookie of the Year and Sixth Man of the Year Awards

- Mike Miller and Malcolm Brogdon

- Only rookie to make the All-Defensive First Team

- Victor Wembanyama, 2023–24

- Shortest player to make the All-NBA team

- Isaiah Thomas (5-foot-9-inches) was included on All-NBA Second Team, 2016–17

- Youngest/oldest MVP winner

- Youngest: Derrick Rose at 22 years and 191 days old, 2010–11
- Oldest: Karl Malone at 35 years and 284 days old, 1998–99

- Youngest/oldest Defensive Player of the Year winner

- Youngest: Victor Wembanyama at 22 years and 106 days old, 2025-26
- Oldest: Dikembe Mutombo at 34 years old, 2000–01

- Youngest/oldest Sixth Man of The Year winner

- Youngest: Ben Gordon at 21 years old, 2004–05 rookie season
- Oldest: Jamal Crawford at 36 years old, 2015–16

- Youngest/oldest player to receive All-NBA First Team honors

- Youngest: LeBron James (21 years, 110 days)
- Oldest: Kareem Abdul-Jabbar (1985–86), at age 38 years old

- Most Citizenship Awards

- Dikembe Mutombo with 2 selections

- Most IBM Awards (defunct)

- David Robinson with 5 selections

- Most Conference Player of the Month Awards

- 41 by LeBron James (also oldest to win award)

- Most Conference Player of the Week Awards

- 69 by LeBron James (also oldest to win award)

- Most Rookie of the Month Awards

- David Robinson, Tim Duncan, LeBron James, Carmelo Anthony, Chris Paul, Blake Griffin, Damian Lillard, Karl-Anthony Towns with 6 selections

== Rookie and age-related records ==
In 2006, the NBA introduced age requirement restrictions. Prospective high school players must wait a year before entering the NBA, making age-related records harder to break.

- Youngest player debut

- Andrew Bynum (18 years, 6 days) with the Los Angeles Lakers against the Denver Nuggets on November 2, 2005.

- Oldest player debut

- Nat Hickey (45 years, 362 days) with the Providence Steamrollers against the St. Louis Bombers on January 27, 1949. He was the team's coach and activated himself as a player. He only played 2 games.

- Youngest debut as a starter

- Kobe Bryant (18 years, 5 months, 5 days) vs. the Dallas Mavericks on January 28, 1997

- Oldest debut as a starter

- Arvydas Sabonis (30 years, 319 days) in his first rookie game with the Portland Trail Blazers vs. the Vancouver Grizzles on November 3, 1995

- Oldest player to start a game

- Robert Parish (43 years, 118 days) against the Atlanta Hawks on December 26, 1996

- Youngest player to be drafted

- Andrew Bynum (17 years, 249 days) after the Los Angeles Lakers selected him as the 10th overall pick in the 2005 NBA draft.

- Oldest player to be drafted

- Phil Elderkin (46 years, 354 days) after the Cleveland Cavaliers selected him as the 205th overall pick in the 1973 NBA draft.

- Youngest/oldest coach

- Youngest: Dave DeBusschere at age 24 was appointed as player-coach in November 1964
- Oldest: Gregg Popovich at age 74, and longest tenure at 28 years

=== Points ===
- Youngest player to reach... (career)

- 5,000 points – LeBron James (21 years, 22 days) on January 21, 2006
- 10,000 points – LeBron James (23 years, 59 days) on February 27, 2008
- 15,000 points – LeBron James (25 years, 79 days) on March 19, 2010
- 20,000 points – LeBron James (28 years, 17 days) on January 16, 2013
- 25,000 points – LeBron James (30 years, 307 days) on November 2, 2015
- 30,000 points – LeBron James (33 years, 24 days) on January 23, 2018
- 35,000 points – LeBron James (36 years, 50 days) on February 18, 2021
- 40,000 points – LeBron James (39 years, 63 days) on March 2, 2024

==== Game records ====
- Most points in a game by a rookie

- 58 by Wilt Chamberlain, Philadelphia Warriors (vs. Detroit Pistons) on January 25, 1960
- 58 by Wilt Chamberlain, Philadelphia Warriors (at New York Knicks) on February 21, 1960

- Most points in first career game (NBA debut)

- 43 by Wilt Chamberlain vs. the New York Knicks on October 24, 1959

- Most points in a game in the 21st season or later

- 42 by LeBron James vs. the Golden State Warriors on February 6th, 2025

- Youngest/oldest player to score 70+ points in a game

- Youngest: Devin Booker of the Phoenix Suns vs. the Boston Celtics at the age of 20 years, 145 days
- Oldest: Damian Lillard at the age of 32 vs. the Houston Rockets on February 26, 2023

- Youngest/oldest player to score 60+ points in a game

- Youngest: Devin Booker of the Phoenix Suns vs. the Boston Celtics at the age of 20 years, 145 days
- Oldest: Kobe Bryant of the Los Angeles Lakers vs the Utah Jazz at the age of 37 years, 234 days

- Youngest/oldest player to score 50+ points in a game

- Youngest: Cooper Flagg (19 years, 103 days) scored 51 points for Dallas Mavericks vs. Orlando Magic on April 3, 2026
- Oldest: Jamal Crawford (39 years, 21 days) scored 51 points for the Phoenix Suns vs. the Dallas Mavericks

- Youngest/oldest player to score 40+ points in a game

- Youngest: Cooper Flagg (18 years, 359 days) for the Dallas Mavericks vs. the Utah Jazz (42pts) on December 15, 2025
- Oldest: LeBron James (40 years, 38 days) for the Los Angeles Lakers vs. the Golden State Warriors (42pts)

- Youngest/oldest player to score 30+ points in a game

- Youngest: LeBron James scoring 33 points vs. the Memphis Grizzlies at the age of 18 years, 334 days
- Oldest: LeBron James scored 36 points vs. the Los Angeles Clippers at the age of 40 years, 355 days

- Youngest/oldest player to score 30+ points in a game as a reserve

- Youngest: Kobe Bryant (19 years, 113 days) scored 30 points vs. the Dallas Mavericks
- Oldest: Michael Jordan (39 years, 40 days) scored 34 points vs. the Milwaukee Bucks

- Youngest/oldest player to score 20+ points in a game

- Youngest: LeBron James (18 years, 324 days) scoring 28 points vs. the Washington Wizards
- Oldest: Udonis Haslem (42 years, 304 days) scoring 24 points vs. the Orlando Magic

- Youngest/oldest player to score 20+ points in a game as a reserve

- Youngest: Jermaine O'Neal (18 years, 101 days) scored 20 points vs. the Seattle SuperSonics
- Oldest: Udonis Haslem (42 years, 304 days) scoring 24 points vs. the Orlando Magic

- Youngest/oldest player to score in a game

- Youngest: Andrew Bynum (18 years, 24 days) on November 20, 2005, 18 days after his debut vs. the Chicago Bulls, posting 4 points with two free throws made and a field goal.
- Oldest: Nat Hickey (45 years, 363 days) on January 27, 1948 for the Providence Steamrollers vs. the St. Louis Bombers. He posted 2 points with two free throws made. These are the only points recorded by Hickey in his entire NBA career.

- Only players with a 40-point game since turning 40 years old

- LeBron James and Michael Jordan

- Only time two 40 year-old players scored 15 points or more in the same game

- Manu Ginóbili (15) and Vince Carter (21) on January 28, 2018

- Only time that opposing players, both age 35 or older, scored at least 35 points in a game

- LeBron James (36pts) and Stephen Curry (46pts) on January 27, 2024

==== Multi-game records ====
- Fewest games played to reach 30,000 points

- 940 by Wilt Chamberlain

- Fewest games played to reach 25,000 points

- 691 by Wilt Chamberlain

- Fewest games played to reach 20,000 points

- 499 by Wilt Chamberlain

- Fewest games played to reach 15,000 points

- 358 by Wilt Chamberlain

- Fewest games played to reach 10,000 points

- 236 by Wilt Chamberlain

- Only rookies to score at least 40 points five games in a row

- Allen Iverson in April 1997, and Wilt Chamberlain

- Only teenager to score 20 points or more in first three career games

- Paolo Banchero - streak ended on his 7th game, scoring 18 points on October 30, 2022

- Most 50-point games since turning 30 years old

- 8 by Stephen Curry

- Most 30-point games since turning 35 years old

- 112 by LeBron James (active)

- Only player with a 50-point game before turning 21 and after turning 35

- LeBron James

- Most points in first five career games

- 124 by Jerry Stackhouse, 1995–96

- Most points in first five career games for an undrafted player

- 112 by Kendrick Nunn, 2019–20

- Most points in first three, four, and five career starts (since 1976-77 merger)

- Jeremy Lin (see Linsanity) with 89, 109, and 136 points in his first three, four, and five career starts, respectively in 2011–12

==== Season records ====
- Most points per game by a rookie

- 37.6 by Wilt Chamberlain, 1959–60

- Only rookie to average more than 28.7 points per 36 minutes (excluding Wilt Chamberlain)

- Joel Embiid with the Philadelphia 76ers, 2016–17

- Youngest/oldest player to lead the league in scoring

- Youngest: Kevin Durant (21 years, 197 days) on April 14, 2010, averaging 30.1 points per game
- Oldest: Michael Jordan (35 years, 60 days) on April 18, 1998, averaging 28.7 points per game

- Only players to average 20 points at 39 years old

- 20.6 points by Karl Malone, 2002–03
- 20.0 points by Michael Jordan, 2002–03

- Oldest player to have multiple 50-point games in a season

- LeBron James on March 11, 2022

- Most 40-point games in a season (age 32 or older)

- 13 by Damian Lillard, 2022–23

=== Field goals ===
- Youngest player to reach... (career)

- 500 3-point field goals – Anthony Edwards (21 years, 164 days) on January 16, 2023
- 1,000 3-point field goals – Anthony Edwards (23 years, 185 days) on February 6, 2025
- 3,000 3-point field goals – Stephen Curry (33 years, 289 days) on December 28, 2021
- 4,000 3-point field goals – Stephen Curry (36 years, 364 days) on March 13, 2026

- Fastest player to reach... (career)

- 100, 200 3-point field goals – Kon Knueppel on December 22, 2025 (achieved in his 29th and 58th games)
- 300, 400, 500, 600, 700, 800, 900, 1000 3-point field goals – Duncan Robinson hit his 1000th vs. the Minnesota Timberwolves on December 26, 2022 (achieved in 343 career games) 300 (95 games), 400 (125 games), 500 (152 games), 600 (184 games), 700 (216 games), 800 (263 games), 900 (305 games)
- 2,000 and 2,500 3-point field goals – Stephen Curry in 597 games to hit 2,000 3-pointers 702 to hit 2500

- Most 3-point field goals made by a rookie in a game

- 9 by Keyonte George vs. the Golden State Warriors on February 15, 2024
- 9 by Yogi Ferrell vs. the Portland Trail Blazers on February 3, 2017
- 9 by Rodrigue Beaubois vs. the Golden State Warriors on March 27, 2010
- 9 by Dalton Knecht vs the Utah Jazz on November 19, 2024

- Most 3-point field goals made by a rookie in a season

- 273 by Kon Knueppel, 2025–26

- Youngest player to make ten 3-pointers in a game

- Anthony Edwards vs the Denver Nuggets on December 15, 2021

- Oldest player to make seven 3-pointers in a game

- Vince Carter at 42 years and 37 days old vs. the Miami Heat on March 5, 2019

=== Free throws ===
- Youngest player to reach... (career)

- 1,000 free throws – LeBron James (20 years, 352 days) on December 17, 2005
- 2,000 free throws – Kevin Durant (22 years, 146 days) on February 22, 2011
- 3,000 free throws – LeBron James (24 years, 91 days) on March 31, 2009
- 4,000 free throws – Kevin Durant (25 years, 199 days) on April 16, 2014
- 5,000 free throws – LeBron James (28 years, 325 days) on November 20, 2013
- 6,000 free throws – Oscar Robertson (30 years, 85 days) on February 17, 1969
- 7,000 free throws – Kobe Bryant (32 years, 230 days) on April 10, 2011
- 8,000 free throws – Kobe Bryant (36 years, 81 days) on November 12, 2014
- 9,000 free throws – Karl Malone (38 years, 209 days) on February 18, 2002

- Most free throws made by a rookie in a season

- 653 by Oscar Robertson, 1960–61

- Most free throws attempted by a rookie in a season

- 991 by Wilt Chamberlain, 1959–60

- Highest free-throw percentage by a rookie in a season

- 90.2% by Ernie DiGregorio, 1973–74

- Lowest free-throw percentage by a rookie in a season

- 46.7% by George Nostrand, 1946–47

- Most free throws attempted by a rookie in a game

- 29 (24 in the 4th quarter) by Ben Simmons vs. the Washington Wizards on November 29, 2017

- Free throw attempts, none made in debut

- 6 by Dwight Howard vs. Milwaukee Bucks on November 3, 2004

- Most free throw makes by a rookie in a game

- 24 by Frank Selvy vs. the Minneapolis Lakers on December 2, 1954

=== Rebounds ===
- Youngest player to reach... (career)

- 1,000 rebounds – Dwight Howard (19 years, 356 days) on November 29, 2005
- 2,000 rebounds – Dwight Howard (20 years, 347 days) on November 20, 2006
- 3,000 rebounds – Dwight Howard (21 years, 343 days) on November 16, 2007
- 4,000 rebounds – Dwight Howard (22 years, 129 days) on April 15, 2008
- 5,000 rebounds – Dwight Howard (23 years, 112 days) on March 30, 2009
- 6,000 rebounds – Dwight Howard (24 years, 96 days) on March 14, 2010
- 7,000 rebounds – Dwight Howard (25 years, 83 days) on March 1, 2011
- 8,000 rebounds – Dwight Howard (26 years, 106 days) on March 23, 2012
- 9,000 rebounds – Dwight Howard (27 years, 130 days) on April 17, 2013
- 10,000 rebounds – Wilt Chamberlain (28 years, 81 days) on November 10, 1964
- 15,000 rebounds – Wilt Chamberlain (30 years, 176 days) on February 13, 1967
- 20,000 rebounds – Bill Russell (34 years, 23 days) on March 6, 1968

- Most rebounds in a game by a rookie

- 45 by Wilt Chamberlain, Philadelphia Warriors (vs. Syracuse Nationals) on February 6, 1960

- Most rebounds in first career game (NBA debut)

- 28 by Wilt Chamberlain vs. the New York Knicks on October 24, 1959

- Most rebounds in rookie season

- 1,941 by Wilt Chamberlain, 1959–60

- Only players to average 8 or more rebounds per game at age 39 or older

- Robert Parish (9.4 rebounds per game) in 1992–93
- Karl Malone (8.7 rebounds per game) in 2003–04

- Youngest/oldest player to lead the league in rebounding

- Youngest: Dwight Howard of the Orlando Magic, at 22 years, 130 days (on April 16, 2008), led the league in rebounding by averaging 14.2 rebounds per game during the 2007–08 NBA season
- Oldest: Dennis Rodman at 36 years, 341 days, 1997–98

- Youngest/oldest player with 20+ rebounds in a game

- Youngest: Dwight Howard (18 years, 359 days) grabbed 20 rebounds vs. the Toronto Raptors
- Oldest: Dikembe Mutombo (40 years, 250 days) posted 22 rebounds vs. the Denver Nuggets on March 2, 2007

- Youngest/oldest player with 15+ rebounds in a game

- Youngest: LeBron James (18 years, 334 days) grabbed 16 rebounds vs. the Memphis Grizzlies
- Oldest: Dikembe Mutombo (42 years, 289 days) grabbed 15 rebounds vs. Golden State Warriors

- Youngest/oldest player with 10+ rebounds in a game as a reserve

- Youngest: Devin Booker (19 years, 68 days) grabbed 10 rebounds vs. the Charlotte Hornets
- Oldest: Kevin Willis (42 years, 85 days) grabbed 10 rebounds vs. the New York Knicks

=== Assists ===
- Youngest player to reach... (career)

- 1,000 assists – LeBron James (20 years, 102 days) on April 11, 2005
- 5,000 assists – Magic Johnson (26 years, 246 days) on April 17, 1986
- 10,000 assists – John Stockton (32 years, 329 days) on February 18, 1995
- 15,000 assists – John Stockton (39 years, 349 days) on March 10, 2003

- Most assists in a game by a rookie

- 25 by Ernie DiGregorio, Buffalo Braves (at Portland Trail Blazers) on January 1, 1974
- 25 by Nate McMillan, Seattle SuperSonics (vs. Los Angeles Clippers) on February 23, 1987

- Most assists in first career game (NBA debut)

- 14 by Ernie DiGregorio

- Most assists in rookie season

- 868 by Mark Jackson, 1987–88

- Only player to average 6 or more assists per game at age 39 or older

- John Stockton (7.7 assists per game), 2002–03
- John Stockton (8.2 assists per game), 2001–02

- Youngest/oldest to lead the league in assists

- Youngest: Oscar Robertson at 22 years, 108 days (on March 12, 1961), averaging 9.7 assists per game in his rookie season
- Oldest: Steve Nash at 37 years, 65 days (on April 13, 2011), averaging 11.4 assists per game

- Youngest/oldest player with 20+ assists in a game

- Youngest: Ennis Whatley (21 years, 156 days) had 22 assists vs. the New York Knicks
- Oldest: Steve Nash (37 years, 43 days) had 20 assists vs. the Los Angeles Lakers

- Youngest/oldest player with 10+ assists in a game

- Youngest: Cooper Flagg (18 years and 342 days) had 11 assists vs. the Los Angeles Lakers on November 29, 2025
- Oldest: John Stockton (41 years, 19 days) had 10 assists vs. the San Antonio Spurs

=== Steals ===
- Youngest player to reach... (career)

- 500 steals – LeBron James (22 years, 29 days) on January 28, 2007
- 1,000 steals – Isiah Thomas (25 years, 264 days) on January 19, 1987
- 1,500 steals – Alvin Robertson (28 years, 207 days) on February 14, 1991
- 2,000 steals – John Stockton (32 years, 3 days) on March 29, 1994
- 3,000 steals – John Stockton (39 years, 250 days) on December 1, 2001

- Most steals in a game by a rookie

- 10 by Ron Harper vs. the 76ers on March 10, 1987

- Most steals in first career game (NBA debut)

- 9 by Michael Carter-Williams vs. the Miami Heat

- Highest average steals per game in rookie season

- 2.57 steals per game by Dudley Bradley, Indiana, 1979–80

- Most steals in rookie season

- 211 by Dudley Bradley, 1979–80

- Youngest/oldest to lead the league in steals

- Youngest: Magic Johnson at 21 years, 227 days (on March 29, 1981), averaging 3.7 steals per game
- Oldest: Mookie Blaylock at 31 years, 30 days on April 19, 1998, averaging 2.6 steals per game

- Youngest/oldest player with 10+ steals in a game

- Youngest: Ron Harper (23 years, 49 days) had 10 steals vs. the Philadelphia 76ers
- Oldest: Jerry West (35 years, 193 days) had 10 steals vs. the Seattle Supersonics

=== Blocks ===
- Youngest player to reach... (career)

- 500 blocks – Josh Smith (21 years, 88 days) on March 3, 2007
- 1,000 blocks – Josh Smith (24 years, 59 days) on February 2, 2010
- 2,000 blocks – Hakeem Olajuwon (29 years, 33 days) on February 23, 1992
- 3,000 blocks – Hakeem Olajuwon (32 years, 298 days) on November 15, 1995

- Most blocks in a game by a rookie

- 15 by Manute Bol vs. the Hawks on January 25, 1986

- Most blocks in rookie season

- 397 by Manute Bol, 1985–86

- Youngest/oldest to lead the league in blocks

- Youngest: Victor Wembanyama at 20 years, 101 days (on April 14, 2024), averaging 3.6 blocks per game
- Oldest: Marcus Camby at 34 years, 25 days (on April 16, 2008), averaging 3.6 blocks per game

- Youngest/oldest player with 10+ blocks in a game

- Youngest: Josh Smith (19 years, 13 days) had 10 blocks vs. the Dallas Mavericks
- Oldest: Dikembe Mutombo (37 years, 193 days) had 10 blocks vs. the New Jersey Nets

=== Other ===
- Youngest player to reach... (career)

- 500 turnovers — LeBron James (20 years, 92 days) on April 1, 2005
- 1,000 turnovers — LeBron James (22 years, 80 days) on March 20, 2007
- 1,500 turnovers — LeBron James (24 years, 75 days) on March 15, 2009
- 2,000 turnovers — LeBron James (26 years, 48 days) on February 16, 2011
- 2,500 turnovers — LeBron James (28 years, 80 days) on March 20, 2013
- 3,000 turnovers — Russell Westbrook (29 years, 150 days) on April 11, 2018
- 3,500 turnovers — LeBron James (32 years, 31 days) on January 30, 2017
- 4,000 turnovers — LeBron James (33 years, 312 days) on November 7, 2018
- 5,000 turnovers — LeBron James (38 years, 315 days) on November 10, 2023
- 500 fouls — Dwight Howard (20 years, 128 days) on April 15, 2006
- 1,000 fouls — Dwight Howard (22 years, 108 days) on March 25, 2008
- 1,500 fouls — Dwight Howard (24 years, 71 days) on February 17, 2010
- 2,000 fouls — Shawn Kemp (26 years, 119 days) on March 24, 1996
- 2,500 fouls — Shawn Kemp (28 years, 48 days) on January 13, 1998
- 3,000 fouls — Shawn Kemp (30 years, 47 days) on January 12, 2000
- 3,500 fouls — Shawn Kemp (32 years, 68 days) on February 2, 2002
- 4,000 fouls – Hakeem Olajuwon (36 years, 101 days) on May 2, 1999
- 4,500 fouls — Karl Malone (40 years, 120 days) on November 11, 2003

==== Game records ====
- Oldest player with game-winning buzzer beater

- LeBron James vs the Indiana Pacers on March 26, 2025

- Youngest/oldest player to record a triple-double

- Youngest: Josh Giddey at the age of 19 years, 84 days (on January 2, 2022)
- Oldest: LeBron James at the age of 41 years, 90 days (March 30, 2026)

- Youngest player to record a 20-rebound triple-double

- Shai Gilgeous-Alexander at 21 years and 185 days old on January 13, 2020

- Youngest/oldest player to record a double-double

- Youngest: Tracy McGrady (18 years, 175 days) on November 15, 1997 vs. the Indiana Pacers (10pts, 11rebs)
- Oldest: Dikembe Mutombo (42 years, 289 days) on April 10, 2009 vs. the Golden State Warriors (10pts, 15rebs)

- Youngest player to lead all players in points, rebounds, and assists in a game

- Josh Giddey on January 2, 2022

- Only player to record a double-double while shooting 100% in a rookie debut

- Walker Kessler (5 of 5 from the field) with 12 points and 10 rebounds on October 19, 2022

- Youngest/oldest player to record a five-by-five

- Youngest: Victor Wembanyama recorded 5x5 on February 23, 2024 at age 20 years, 50 days
- Oldest: Hakeem Olajuwon recorded a 5x5 on December 30, 1993, at age 30 years, 343 days

- Only player to have a triple-double in a game in the 20th season

- LeBron James with 28 points, 10 rebounds, and 11 assists vs. the New York Knicks on January 31, 2023

- Oldest player to record 30 points, 10 assists, 5 steals in a game

- LeBron James vs. the Phoenix Suns on December 5, 2023(IST Qtr Finals)

- Oldest player to record 30 point triple-double

- LeBron James (33pts, 11rebs, 12asts) vs. the New York Knicks on February 1, 2025

- Only players to record 40 points and zero turnovers in a game at age 35 or older

- Michael Jordan and LeBron James on December 31, 2021

- Oldest player to record 55 points and 10 rebounds in a game

- LeBron James on March 5, 2022

- Only teenagers with at least 20 points, 15 rebounds and 5 assists in a game

- LeBron James at 18 years, 334 days old on November 29, 2003
- Jalen Duren at 19 years, 344 days old on October 28, 2023

- Youngest player to record at least 20 points and 20 rebounds in a game

- Victor Wembanyama (19 years, 38 days) vs. the Chicago Bulls on December 8, 2023

- Only rookie with at least 20 points, 10 rebounds, 6 steals, 4 blocks in a game

- Victor Wembanyama (22pts, 11rebs, 2asts) vs. the Denver Nuggets on November 26, 2023

- Only rookie with at least 10 blocks, 4 assists, and 1 steal in a game

- Victor Wembanyama (27pts, 14rebs, 5asts, 2stls) vs. the Toronto Raptors on February 12, 2024

- Only teenager with at least 30 points, 5 rebounds, 5 assists, 5 blocks in a game

- Victor Wembanyama (6rebs, 6asts, 7blks) vs. the Portland Trail Blazers on December 28, 2023

- Youngest player to record a triple-double without a turnover in a game

- Victor Wembanyama (at 20 years and 6 days) vs. the Detroit Pistons on January 10, 2024

- Only rookie with at least 10 points, 5 blocks, 5 steals in a game

- Jamaal Tinsley (12pts, 15asts, 9rebs, 6stls) vs. the Minnesota Timberwolves on November 16, 2001

- Only rookie with at least 15 assists, 10 rebounds, 3 steals, 1 block in a game

- Michael Jordan (35pts, 14rebs) vs. the Denver Nuggets on January 14, 1985

- Only rookie with at least 20 points, 15 rebounds, 5 assists, 10 blocks in a game

- Ralph Sampson (28pts, 18rebs, 13blks) vs. the Chicago Bulls on December 9, 1983

- Only rookie with at least 30 points, 13 rebounds, 3 assists, 3 steals, 6 blocks in a game

- Chris Webber (36pts, 4asts) vs. the Sacramento Kings on January 4, 1994

- Only rookie with at least 20 points, 4 steals, 5 blocks in a game

- Chris Webber (35pts, 7rebs, 3asts, 6blks) vs. the Los Angeles Clippers on March 13, 1994

- Only rookie with at least 7 steals and 3 blocks in a game

- Alvin Robertson (27pts, 3rebs, 3asts) vs. the Utah Jazz on January 15, 1985

- Only rookie with at least 8 rebounds, 7 steals, and 1 block in a game

- Magic Johnson (14pts, 16rebs, 6asts, 2blks) vs. the Portland Trail Blazers on March 12, 1980

- Only rookie with at least 50 points and 25 rebounds in a game

- Wilt Chamberlain (58pts, 42rebs, 4asts) vs. the Detroit Pistons on January 25, 1960
- Wilt Chamberlain (55pts, 29rebs, 2 asts) vs. the Cincinnati Royals on November 12, 1959
- Wilt Chamberlain (53pts, 29rebs, 1 ast) vs. the Boston Celtics on February 23, 1960

- Only rookie with at least 10 points, 10 assists, 10 rebounds, 5 steals, 1 block in a game

- John Wall (19pts, 13asts, 6stls) vs. the Houston Rockets on November 10, 2010

- Only rookie with at least 20 rebounds, 5 assists, 5 steals in a game

- John Drew (44 points) vs. the New Orleans Jazz on November 16, 1974

- Only rookie with at least 30 points, 17 assists, 1 steal in a game

- Jason Kidd (4rebs, 4stls) vs. the Golden State Warriors on March 13, 1995

- Only rookie with at least 9 blocks and 4 steals in a game

- Nerlens Noel (12pts, 9rebs) vs. the Indiana Pacers on February 20, 2015

- Only rookie with at least 40 points, 15 assists, 1 steal in a game

- Trae Young (49pts, 16asts, 8rebs, 1blk) vs. the Chicago Bulls on March 1, 2019

- Only rookie with at least 15 rebounds, 7 blocks, 4 steals in a game

- David Robinson (19pts, 18rebs, 2asts, 8blks) vs. the Portland Trail Blazers on November 8, 1989

- Only rookie with at least 10 blocks and 3 steals in a game

- David Robinson (24pts, 12rebs, 2 asts, 12blks) vs. the Minnesota Timberwolves on February 23, 1990

- Only rookie with at least 10 assists, 7 steals, and 1 block in a game

- Norm Nixon (16pts, 5rebs, 8stls) vs. the New Jersey Nets on November 2, 1977

- Only rookie with at least 17 points, 8 steals, and 1 block in a game

- Ron Lee (18pts, 7rebs, 3asts, 2blks) vs. the New York Knicks on January 19, 1977

- Only rookie with at least 37 points, 4 steals, 3 blocks in a game

- Walt Williams (40pts, 6rebs, 3 asts, 4blks) vs. the Philadelphia 76ers on January 2, 1993

- Only rookie with at least 20 points, 4 assists, 4 steals, 5 blocks in a game

- Victor Wembanyama (27pts, 10rebs, 8asts, 5stls) vs. the Los Angeles Lakers on February 23, 2024

- Only rookie with at least 15 rebounds, 4 assists, 7 blocks, 1 steal in a game

- Bill Walton (15pts, 20rebs, 5asts, 9blks, 1stl) vs. the Golden State Warriors on October 22, 1974

==== Multi-game records ====
- Youngest player to record consecutive 25-point triple-doubles

- Luka Dončić of the Dallas Mavericks on November 3, 2019

- Most games with 40 points, 10 rebounds, 5 assists before turning 25 years old

- 16 by Oscar Robertson

- Most games with 30 points, 5 rebounds, 5 assists before turning 25 years old

- 147 by Luka Dončić on February 22, 2024

- Only player to average 25 points per game on 60% field goal percentage in first 100 career games

- Zion Williamson, 2020–21

- Most consecutive double-doubles by a teenager

- 8 by Victor Wembanyama on December 17, 2023

- Oldest player to record 2, 3, and 4 consecutive triple doubles

- LeBron James (age 39) on November 8, November 10, November 13, and November 15, 2024

- Only player to record 5,000 rebounds and 3,000 assists in first 500 career games

- Nikola Jokić on January 25, 2022

- Fastest player to reach 15,000 points, 7,500 rebounds and 5,000 assists

- Nikola Jokić in 709 games on January 15, 2025

- Youngest player to reach at least 16,000 points, 7,000 rebounds, 3,000 assists in a career

- Giannis Antetokounmpo (28 years, 347 days) on November 18, 2023

==== Season records ====
- Most turnovers in a rookie season

- 345 by Ron Harper, 1986–87

- Most minutes in a rookie season

- 3,695 by Elvin Hayes, San Diego, 1968–69

- Only rookie to lead his team in four statistics, season

- Michael Jordan (28.2 ppg, 6.5 rpg, 5.9 apg, 2.4 spg), 1984–85 Chicago Bulls

- Youngest player to lead the league in triple-doubles in a season

- Luka Dončić recorded his 17th triple-double of the season on August 8, 2020

- Most points, rebounds, assists, minutes per game and field goals in 20th season

- LeBron James with 28.9 PPG, 8.3 RPG, 6.8 APG, 35.5 MPG, 1,219 field goals, 2022–23

- Only players to average 33 minutes or more at age 39 or older, season

- Karl Malone (36.2 minutes per game), 2002–03
- Michael Jordan (37 minutes per game), 2002–03

- Only rookie to average 20 points, 7.5 rebounds, 2.5 blocks, and one made 3-pointer per game

- Joel Embiid with the Philadelphia 76ers, 2016–17

- Only rookies to average more than 25 points, 5 rebounds, 5 assists per game, season

- Michael Jordan (1984-85) & Oscar Robertson (1960-61)

- Youngest to average a double-double, season

- Dwight Howard during his rookie season, 2004–05

- Only rookie with 1,000 points, 500 rebounds, seventy-five 3-pointers, 100 blocks in a season

- Kristaps Porziņģis, 2015–16

- Only player to play all 82 games for the first time in their 17th season or later

- Jamal Crawford, 2016–17

- Only player straight out of high school to start all 82 games in his rookie season

- Dwight Howard, 2004–05

== Individual career records ==
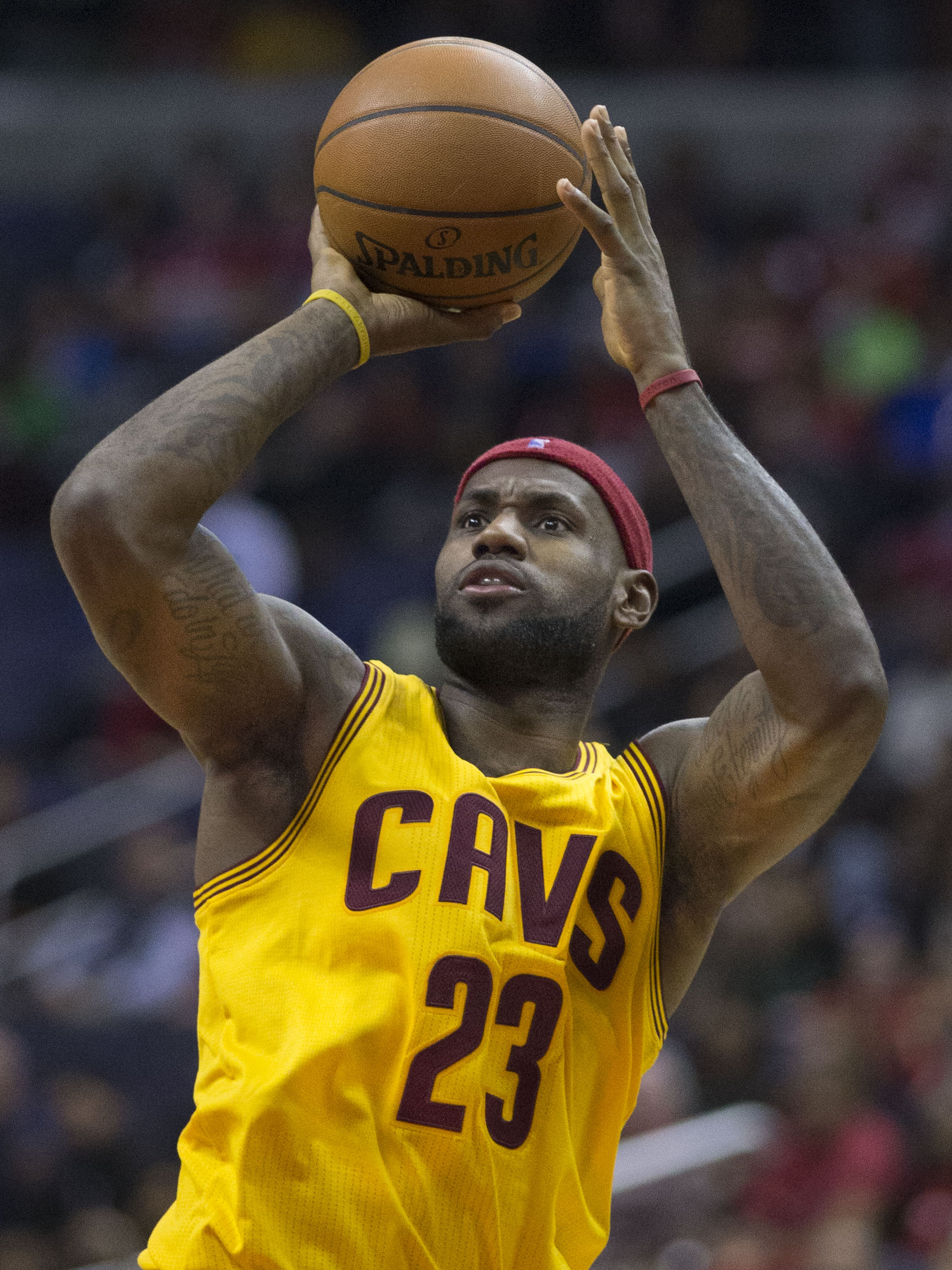
LeBron James is the all-time leader in a number of categories, including most seasons played, most career points, and nearly every individual playoff statistic.

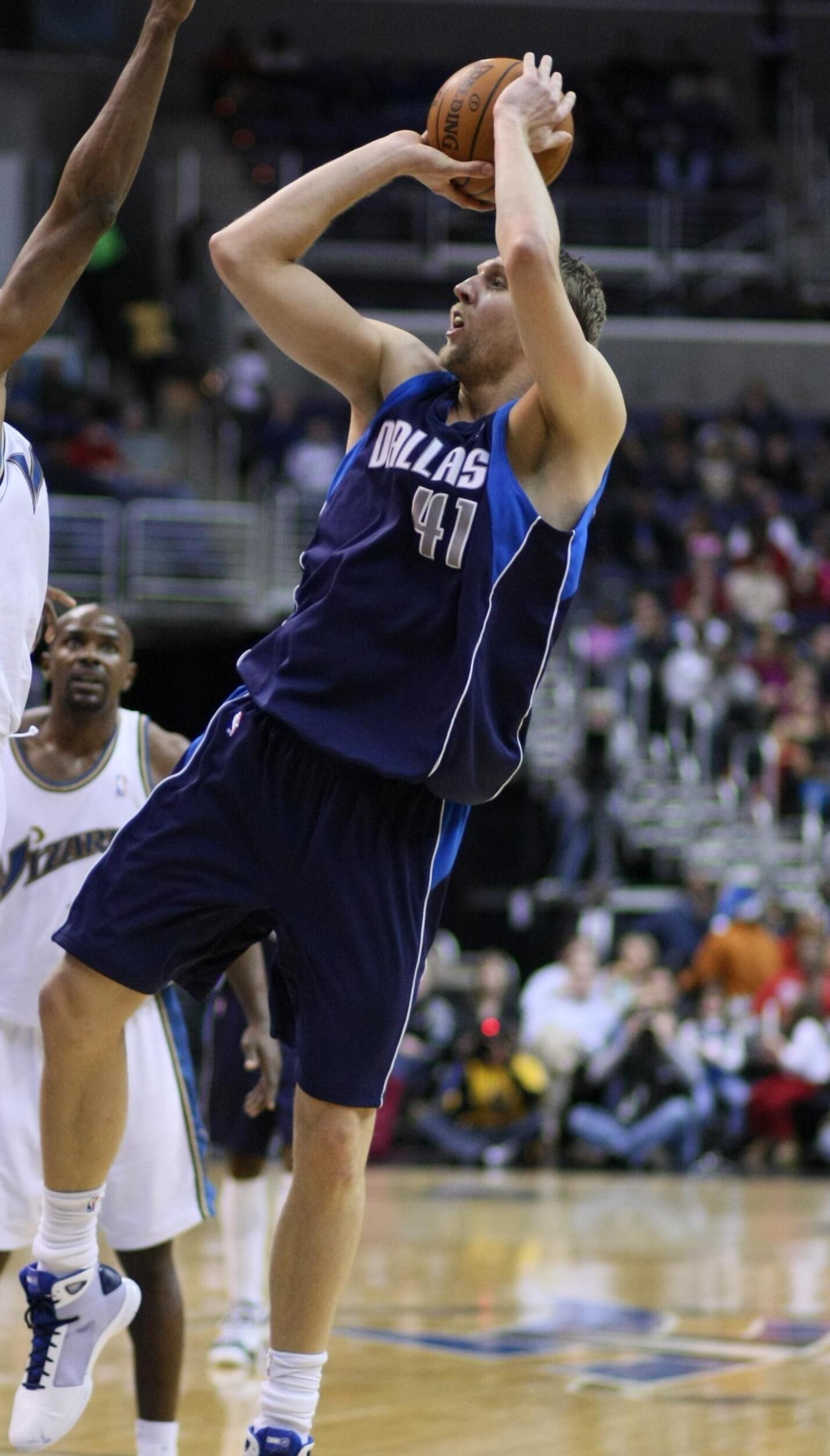
Dirk Nowitzki played all 21 of his NBA seasons with the Dallas Mavericks, the most seasons played with a single franchise.

- Most seasons played, career

- 23 by LeBron James (active)

- Most seasons played on one team, career

- 21 by Dirk Nowitzki (1998–2019) with the Dallas Mavericks

- Most games played, career

- 1,622 by LeBron James (active)

- Most consecutive games played

- 1,192 by A.C. Green

- Most games played on one team, career

- 1,522 by Dirk Nowitzki

- Most minutes played, career

- 61,030 by LeBron James (active)

- Most minutes per game averaged, career

- 45.8 by Wilt Chamberlain

- Most triple-doubles, career

- 209 by Russell Westbrook

- Most 50–40–90 seasons, career

- 4 by Steve Nash between 2005 and 2010

=== Points ===
Statistics accurate as of the end of 2025–26 NBA season.

- Most points, career

- 43,440 by LeBron James (active)

- Most points with one franchise, career

- 36,374 by Karl Malone

- Highest scoring average, career

- Michael Jordan (30.12 ppg)

- Most seasons leading the league in total points, career

- 11 by Michael Jordan (1984–85, 1986–87–1992–93, 1995–96–1997–98)

- In 1984–85, Jordan led in total points, but was 3rd in points per game behind Bernard King and Larry Bird.

- Most consecutive seasons leading league in total points

- 7 by Wilt Chamberlain (1959–60–1965–66) and Michael Jordan (1986–87–1992–93)

- Most seasons scoring 2,000 or more points

- 12 (11 consecutive) by Karl Malone

- Most double-digit scoring games (10+ pts), career

- 1,613 by LeBron James (active)

- Most 15+ point games, career

- 1,545 by LeBron James (active)

- Most 20+ point games, career

- 1,321 by LeBron James (active)

- Most 25+ point games, career

- 989 by LeBron James (active)

- Most 30+ point games, career

- 577 by LeBron James (active)

- Most 35+ point games, career

- 381 by Wilt Chamberlain

- Most 40+ point games, career

- 271 by Wilt Chamberlain

- Most 45+ point games, career

- 176 by Wilt Chamberlain

- Most 50+ point games, career

- 118 by Wilt Chamberlain

- Most 55+ point games, career

- 72 by Wilt Chamberlain

- Most 60+ point games, career

- 32 by Wilt Chamberlain

- Most consecutive 10+ point games

- 1,297 by LeBron James from January 6, 2007 – December 4, 2025

- Most consecutive 15+ point games

- 271 by Michael Jordan from March 16, 1987 – November 13, 1990

- Most consecutive 20+ point games

- 141 by Shai Gilgeous-Alexander from November 1, 2024 – October 22, 2026

- Most consecutive 25+ point games

- 106 by Wilt Chamberlain from October 19, 1961– December 14, 1962

- Most consecutive 30+ point games

- 65 by Wilt Chamberlain from November 4, 1961 – February 22, 1962

- Most consecutive 35+ point games

- 33 by Wilt Chamberlain from January 3, 1962 – February 22, 1962

- Most consecutive 40+ point games

- 14 by Wilt Chamberlain (from December 8 – 30, 1961) and Wilt Chamberlain (from January 11 – February 1, 1962)

- Most consecutive 45+ point games

- 9 by Wilt Chamberlain from November 9, 1962 – November 23, 1962

- Most consecutive 50+ point games

- 7 by Wilt Chamberlain from December 16, 1961 – December 29, 1961

- Most consecutive 55+ point games

- 5 by Wilt Chamberlain from February 25, 1962 – March 4, 1962

- Most consecutive 60+ point games

- 4 by Wilt Chamberlain from February 25, 1962 – March 2, 1962

- Most points scored on birthday, career

- 346 by LeBron James (active)

- Most bench points, career

- 13,396 by Lou Williams

- Most points by a non-Hall of Famer (min. 1 year retired), career

- 20,558 by LaMarcus Aldridge

- Most points by a non-All-Star, career

- 19,419 by Jamal Crawford

- Highest points per game average by a non-All-Star, career

- 20.1 by John Williamson

- Most points on Christmas Day, career

- 507 by LeBron James (active)

- Highest points per game average on Christmas Day (min. 2 games played), career

- 43.3 by Tracy McGrady (3 games played)

- Highest scoring average in season openers, career

- Michael Jordan (30.8 ppg in 14 games played)

- Only player to score 40 points against all 30 teams, career

- LeBron James with a 46-point performance vs. the Los Angeles Clippers on January 24, 2023

- Most 20-point quarters, career (since tracking in 1996-97)

- 43 by Stephen Curry (active)

=== Field goals ===
- Highest 3-point field goal percentage, career

- 45.40% by Steve Kerr

- Most 3-point field goals made, career

- 4,248 by Stephen Curry (active)

- Most field goals made, career

- 15,961 by LeBron James (active)

- Most field goals attempted, career

- 31,502 by LeBron James (active)

- Most field goals missed

- 15,541 by LeBron James (active)

- Most 3-point field goals attempted, career

- 10,073 by Stephen Curry (active)

- Most 3-point field goals missed, career

- 5,933 by James Harden (active)

- Lowest 3-point field goal percentage (min. 1,000 attempts), career

- 26.6% by Charles Barkley

- Lowest field goal percentage (min. 2,000 misses), career

- 27.2% by John Mahnken (of his 3,557 field goal attempts)

- Highest true shooting percentage, career

- 67.2% by Rudy Gobert (active)

- Highest effective field goal percentage, career

- 67.4% by DeAndre Jordan

- Highest half-court shot percentage, career

- 9.1% (4 of 44) by Jason Kidd

- Most seasons leading the league in field goal percentage

- 10 by Shaquille O'Neal

- Most consecutive seasons leading league in field goals made

- 7 by Wilt Chamberlain (1960–66) and Michael Jordan (1987–93)

- Most consecutive seasons leading league in field goals attempted

- 7 by Wilt Chamberlain (1960–66)

- Most seasons leading the league in field goals made

- 10 by Michael Jordan (1986–87–1992–93, 1995–96–1997–98)

- Most seasons leading the league in field goals attempted

- 9 by Michael Jordan (1986–87–1987–88, 1989–90–1992–93, 1995–96–1997–98)

- Most seasons leading league in 3-point field goals made

- 8 by Stephen Curry (active)

- Most consecutive seasons leading league in 3-point field goals made

- 5 by Stephen Curry (active)

- Most missed layups (since tracking began 1996–97 season), career

- at least 2,898 by Russell Westbrook (active)

- Most consecutive field goals made

- 35 by Wilt Chamberlain from February 17–28, 1967

- Most consecutive 3-point field goals made over a span of three games

- 13 by Shake Milton (2019–20), Brent Price, Terry Mills (tie between 3 players)

- Most consecutive games with a field goal made

- 1,499 by LeBron James from January 3, 2005 – (active)

- Most consecutive games with at least one 3-point field goal made

- 268 by Stephen Curry, ending his streak vs. the Portland Trail Blazers on December 17, 2023

- Most consecutive games with at least five 3-point field goals made

- 12 by James Harden from December 19, 2018 – January 11, 2019

- Most consecutive games with at least six 3-point field goals made

- 5 by James Harden from November 1 – 11, 2017
- 5 by Stephen Curry from October 21 – 28, 2018

- Most consecutive games with at least ten 3-point field goals made

- 2 by Stephen Curry on February 27, 2016, and on April 14, 2021
- 2 by James Harden, achieved on December 14, 2019

- Most games with at least ten 3-point field goals made, career

- 25 by Stephen Curry

- Most 3-point field goals made off the bench, career

- 1,385 by Kyle Korver

- Most 3-point field goals made by a center, career

- 1,195 by Karl-Anthony Towns

- Most 3-point field goals attempted by a center, career

- 3,238 by Brook Lopez

- Most field goals attempted off the bench, career

- 10,393 by Lou Williams

- Most 3-point field goals made on Christmas Day, career

- 31 by James Harden

=== Free throws ===
- Most free throws made, career

- 9,787 by Karl Malone

- Highest free throw percentage, career

- 91.2% by Stephen Curry (active)

- Most consecutive free throws made

- 97 by Micheal Williams from March 24, 1993, to November 9, 1993

- Most free throws attempted, career

- 13,188 by Karl Malone

- Lowest free throw percentage, career

- 41.4% by Ben Wallace

- Most seasons leading league in free throws attempted

- 9 by Wilt Chamberlain

- Most seasons leading league in free throw percentage

- 7 by Bill Sharman

- Most seasons leading the league in free throws made

- 8 by Karl Malone

- Most free throws made off the bench, career

- 3,507 by Lou Williams

- Highest free throw percentage by a center, career

- 84.8% by Jack Sikma

=== Rebounds ===
- Most rebounds, career

- 23,924 by Wilt Chamberlain

- Highest rebounds per game average, career

- 22.9 by Wilt Chamberlain

- Most offensive rebounds (since tracking began 1973–74 season), career

- 6,731 by Moses Malone

- Most defensive rebounds (since tracking began 1973–74 season), career

- 11,453 by Kevin Garnett

- Most point-rebound double-doubles, career

- 968 by Wilt Chamberlain

- Longest continuous streak of double-doubles

- 227 consecutive double-doubles by Wilt Chamberlain from 1964 to 1967

- Most seasons leading league in rebounds

- 11 by Wilt Chamberlain

- Most consecutive seasons leading the league in rebounds

- 7 by Dennis Rodman (1991–92-1997–98)

- Highest total rebound percentage, career

- 25.04% by Andre Drummond

- Highest offensive rebound percentage, career

- 17.21% by Dennis Rodman

- Highest defensive rebound percentage, career

- 33.72% by Andre Drummond

- Only player to record 20 or more rebounds in a game for five different teams

- Dennis Rodman (Detroit Pistons, San Antonio Spurs, Chicago Bulls, Los Angeles Lakers, Dallas Mavericks)

- Only player to lead the league in offensive rebounding with three different teams

- Dennis Rodman (Detroit Pistons, San Antonio Spurs, Chicago Bulls)

- Most total rebounds off the bench, career

- 3,829 by Ed Davis

- Most offensive rebounds off the bench, career

- 1,321 by Ed Davis

- Most total rebounds by a guard, career

- 8,761 by Russell Westbrook (active)

- Most offensive rebounds by a guard, career

- 2,615 by Clyde Drexler

- Most rebounds by a non-Hall of Famer, career

- 13,017 by Buck Williams

- Most rebounds by a non-All-Star, career

- 9,513 by Marcus Camby, averaged 9.8rpg

- Most rebounds on Christmas Day, career

- 176 by Bill Russell

=== Assists ===
- Most assists, career

- 15,806 by John Stockton

- Most assists per game, career

- 11.19 assists per game by Magic Johnson

- Most seasons leading the league in assists per game

- 9 by John Stockton

- Highest assist percentage, career

- 50.24% by John Stockton

- Most point-assist double-doubles

- 714 by John Stockton

- Most assists off the bench, career

- 3,262 by Lou Williams

- Most assists by a center, career

- 6,080 by Nikola Jokić (active)

- Most assists by a non-Hall of Famer (min. 1 year retired), career

- 10,334 by Mark Jackson

- Most assists by a non-All-Star, career

- 8,524 by Andre Miller

- Highest assists per game average by a non-All-Star, career

- 8.1 by Kevin Porter

- Most assists on Christmas Day, career

- 145 by Oscar Robertson

=== Steals ===
- Most steals, career

- 3,265 by John Stockton

- Most seasons leading the league in steals per game

- 6 by Chris Paul

- Most consecutive seasons leading league in steals

- 4 by Chris Paul (2010–11–2013–14)

- Highest steals per game average (min. 1,250 steals), career

- 2.71 by Alvin Robertson

- Highest steal percentage, career

- 4.12% by Alvin Robertson

- Most consecutive games with at least 1 steal

- 108 by Chris Paul

- Most consecutive games with at least 2 steals

- 29 by John Stockton from March 6, 1992 to November 20, 1992

- Most steals by a center, career

- 2,162 by Hakeem Olajuwon

- Most point-steal double-doubles, career

- 4 by Alvin Robertson

- Most steals off the bench, career

- 843 by Manu Ginobili and Dell Curry

- Most steals by a non-Hall of Famer (min. 1 year retired), career

- 2,112 by Alvin Robertson

- Most steals on Christmas Day, career

- 29 by Russell Westbrook

=== Blocks ===
- Most blocks, career

- 3,830 by Hakeem Olajuwon

- Most consecutive seasons leading the league in total blocks

- 5 by Dikembe Mutombo (1994-98)

- Most seasons leading the league in blocks per game

- 4 by Kareem Abdul-Jabbar, Marcus Camby, and Mark Eaton

- Most consecutive seasons leading the league in blocks per game

- 3 by Dikembe Mutombo (1994-96) and Marcus Camby (2005-2008)

- Most blocks per game, career

- 3.50 by Mark Eaton

- Highest block percentage, career

- 7.83% by Shawn Bradley

- Most point-block double-doubles, career

- 12 by Dikembe Mutombo

- Most blocks by a guard, career

- 885 by Dwyane Wade

- Most blocks off the bench, career

- 1,441 by Manute Bol

- Most blocks by a non-Hall of Famer (min. 1 year retired), career

- 3,064 by Mark Eaton

- Only players to average more blocks than personal fouls (minimum 1,300 blocks), career

- Ben Wallace averaged more blocks (2.0 per game) than fouls (1.9 per game).

- Note: Ben Wallace is the only player to also average more steals (1.3 per game) than turnovers (1.0 per game).

- Mark Eaton averaged more blocks (3.5 per game) than fouls (3.4 per game).
- Manute Bol averaged more blocks (3.3 per game) than fouls (2.3 per game).
- David Robinson averaged more blocks (3.0 per game) than fouls (2.9 per game).

- Most blocks on Christmas Day, career

- 25 by Shaquille O'Neal

- Most consecutive games with at least 1 block

- 145 by Patrick Ewing from November 5, 1988 to March 23, 1990

- Most consecutive games with at least 2 blocks

- 77 by Mark Eaton from November 12, 1984 to October 30, 1985

=== Game winners ===
- Most game-winning buzzer-beaters, career

- 7 regular season game-winners by Kobe Bryant and Joe Johnson

Note: Michael Jordan has 6 regular season game-winners and 3 playoff game-winners

- Most 3-point buzzer-beaters, career

- 4 by Vince Carter

- Only player to hit buzzer-beaters with four different teams

- Jerry Stackhouse with 76ers (1997), Pistons (1999), Wizards (2002), and Mavericks (2008)

- Only player with multiple 45-plus-point games with a buzzer-beater

- Larry Bird on November 7, 1987 (47 pts) and January 27, 1985 (48 pts)

- Only players with buzzer-beaters in consecutive games

- Larry Bird on January 27 and 29, 1985
- DeMar DeRozan on December 31, 2021, and January 1, 2022

- Only player with buzzer-beaters on consecutive nights

- DeMar DeRozan on December 31, 2021, and January 1, 2022

- Assisted on the most buzzer-beaters

- 4 by Paul Pierce and Jason Kidd

- Most points in game with buzzer-beater

- 58 by Fred Brown vs. the Warriors on March 23, 1974

- Most games with a buzzer-beater and triple-double in the same game

- 2 by LeBron James and Russell Westbrook

=== Advanced stats ===
- Highest Value Over Replacement Player (VORP), career

- 159.39 by LeBron James (active)

- Highest Player efficiency rating (PER), career

- 28.85 by Nikola Jokić

- Highest Defensive Win Shares (DWS), career

- 133.62 by Bill Russell

- Highest Offensive Win Shares (OWS), career

- 191.13 by LeBron James

- Highest Win Shares per 48 minutes (WS/48), career

- .2648 by Nikola Jokić

- Highest Usage Percentage, career

- 35.83% by Luka Dončić (active)

- Highest Plus/Minus (since tracking began 1996–97), career

- +8,910 by Tim Duncan

- Lowest Plus/Minus (since tracking began 1996–97), career

- -2,904 by Shareef Abdur-Rahim

- Highest Box Plus/Minus (BPM), career

- 10.63 by Nikola Jokić

- Highest Offensive Box Plus/Minus, career

- 7.57 by Nikola Jokić

- Highest Defensive Box Plus/Minus, career

- 3.06 by Nikola Jokić

- Highest Offensive rating (points produced per 100 possessions), career

- 130.48 by Jarrett Allen

- Lowest Defensive rating (points allowed per 100 possessions), career

- 95.30 by Gar Heard

- Highest assist-to-turnover ratio (min. 5,000 assists), career

- 4.69 by Muggsy Bogues

- Highest assist-to-turnover ratio (min. 1,000 assists), career

- 5.43 by Tyus Jones

- Highest steal-to-turnover ratio (min. 100 steals), career

- 2.72 by Matisse Thybulle

=== Turnovers ===
- Most turnovers, career

- 5,650 by LeBron James (active)

- Highest turnovers per game average, career

- 4.2 by Trae Young

- Longest streak of consecutive games with a turnover

- 407 by Russell Westbrook from March 14, 2016, to January 4, 2022

- Lowest Turnover percentage, career

- 7.15% by Tim Hardaway Jr.

- Most point-turnover double-doubles, career

- 9 by James Harden

- Most turnovers by a non-Hall of Famer (min. 10 years retired), career

- 3,493 by Reggie Theus

=== Coaches ===
- Most games head coached, career

- 2,487 games by Lenny Wilkens for six teams in 32 seasons

- Most games won by head coach, career

- 1,390 by Gregg Popovich

- Most games lost by head coach, career

- 1,155 by Lenny Wilkens

- Reached 300 wins faster than any head coach

- Steve Kerr (300-77 record) accomplished on January 26, 2019

- Highest number of teams head coached, career

- 9 by Larry Brown

- Most victories on Christmas Day, career

- 11 by Phil Jackson and Jack Ramsay

- Most technical fouls by head coach, career

- 466 by Jerry Sloan (unconfirmed, please correct)

- Most ejections by head coach, career

- 79 by Don Nelson (unconfirmed, please correct)

=== Other ===
- Most wins, career

- 1,074 by Kareem Abdul-Jabbar

- Most losses, career

- 756 by Vince Carter

- Most games played on Christmas Day, career

- 19 by LeBron James

- Most victories on Christmas Day, career

- 11 by LeBron James

- Most four-point plays, career

- 101 by James Harden

- Most five-by-fives, career

- 6 by Hakeem Olajuwon

- Only player with at least 10,000 points, 10,000 rebounds, 10,000 assists, career

- LeBron James with 40,474 points, 11,185 rebounds, 11,009 assists (active)

- Only player with at least 2,000 3-pointers made, 2,000 steals, 1,000 blocks, career

- LeBron James with 2,410 3-pointers made, 2,275 steals, 1,111 blocks (active)

- Only player with at least 25,000 points, 10,000 rebounds, 5,000 assists, 1,500 blocks, 1,500 steals, career

- Kevin Garnett with 26,071 points, 14,662 rebounds, 5,445 assists, 2,037 blocks, 1,859 steals

- Most technical fouls by a player, career

- 332 by Karl Malone

- Most ejections by a player, career

- 29 by Rasheed Wallace

- Most consecutive officiated games

- 2,635 by Dick Bavetta (1975-2014)

- Only player who is franchise's leader in points, rebounds, assists, steals, blocks

- Kevin Garnett with the Minnesota Timberwolves

- Most personal fouls, career

- 4,657 by Kareem Abdul-Jabbar

- Most personal fouls averaged per game, career

- 4.2 by George Mikan

- Most personal fouls off the bench

- 2,416 by Antoine Carr

- Most disqualifications (fouling out or ejections), career

- 127 by Vern Mikkelsen

- Most seasons leading the league in personal fouls

- 3 by Darryl Dawkins, DeMarcus Cousins, George Mikan, Shawn Kemp, and Vern Mikkelsen

- Most charges drawn (since 2000 when stat was first trackable), career

- at least 259 by Kyle Lowry

- Shortest career in terms of time played

- 3.9 seconds by JamesOn Curry

- Most career dunks (since being tracked in 1996–97)

- 2,910 by Dwight Howard

- Most half-court makes, career

- 7 by Stephen Curry (minimum shot distance of 47 feet)

- Most half-court attempts, career

- 102 by Andre Miller (3-for-102), dropping his 3-point percentage from 32% to 26%

- Highest jump ball win rate (min. 100 jumps), since tracking began 1996–97 season

- 76.3% (894-277) by Shaquille O'Neal

- Lowest jump ball win rate (min. 100 jumps), since tracking began 1996–97 season

- 21.7% (45-162) by Luis Scola

- Most seasons averaging over 20 rebounds per game

- 10 by Bill Russell and Wilt Chamberlain

- Most seasons averaging over 30 points and 20 rebounds per game

- 7 by Wilt Chamberlain

- Most consecutive starts to begin career

- 1,118 by Patrick Ewing

- Most starts, career

- 1,593 by LeBron James (active)

- Most consecutive starts, career

- 1,395 by Karl Malone

- Most games with at least 20 points, 10 assists, and no turnovers

- 13 by Chris Paul

- Most 50-point games with at most 4 free throws attempted

- 3 by Stephen Curry

- Most 50-point games with at most 10 free throws attempted

- 8 by Stephen Curry

- Most 40-point games with at most 2 free throws attempted

- 8 by Stephen Curry

- Most 40-point games with at most 9 free throws attempted

- 49 by Stephen Curry

- Most 30-point games with at most 2 free throws attempted

- 44 by Stephen Curry

- Most 30-point games with at most 7 free throws attempted

- 203 by Stephen Curry

- Only player with 40 points, five 3-pointers, and a 65% field goal percentage in consecutive games

- Stephen Curry on November 7 and 11, 2022

- Only player with 50 points and more than ten 3-pointers in consecutive games

- James Harden achieved on December 14, 2019

- Only player with eight-consecutive 35-point games with a 50% field goal percentage

- DeMar DeRozan on February 16, 2022

- Most games with at least 30 points, 5 rebounds, 5 assists, career

- 409 by LeBron James (active)

- Only player with six-consecutive 30-point games while shooting over 60 percent from the field

- LeBron James in February 2013

- Most games with 30 points and 10 rebounds while shooting over 85 percent from the field

- 12 by Wilt Chamberlain

- Only player to average 40 points on 50–40–100 splits in a 4-game span

- Stephen Curry, 2023–24

- Only player to average 40 points, 12 rebounds, and 11 assists over a 5-game span

- Russell Westbrook, 2014–15

- Most seasons averaging a triple double

- 4 by Russell Westbrook in 2016–19 and 2020-21

- Only player with at least 10 triple-doubles each season for seven consecutive seasons

- Nikola Jokić achieved this record on December 14, 2023

- Most games with a triple-double on perfect field goal shooting

- 3 by Wilt Chamberlain and Nikola Jokić

- Most games played off the bench, career

- 1,001 by Lou Williams (first tracked in 1970–71)

- Only players with at least 20 points and 20 assists in back-to-back games

- Tyrese Haliburton, Magic Johnson, John Stockton

- Only players with at least 5 blocks and 5 steals in back-to-back games

- Michael Jordan (1987) and Victor Wembanyama (2024)

- Most games played before first career double-double

- 828 by JJ Redick

- Most minutes played by a non-Hall of Famer (min. 1 year retired)

- 44,235 by Joe Johnson

- Only player to lead his team in 4 out of 5 major stat categories for 8 straight seasons (min. 50 games)

- Hakeem Olajuwon led his team in averaging points, rebounds, steals, blocks (1985-93, 1994-95)

- Most wins in first 300 starts

- Kawhi Leonard (235-65 record)

- Most wedgies (basketball stuck between rim and backboard), career

- 7 by Russell Westbrook (since tracking began in 2014)

- Most consecutive games with at least 30 points and 10 rebounds

- 16 by Kareem Abdul-Jabbar, 1971–72

== Individual season records ==
- Most games played, season

- 88 by Walt Bellamy, 1968–69

- Most minutes played, season

- 3,882 by Wilt Chamberlain, 1961–62

- Most minutes per game average, season

- 48.52 by Wilt Chamberlain, 1961–62

- Most triple-doubles, season

- 42 by Russell Westbrook, 2016–17

- Most consecutive triple-doubles

- 11 by Russell Westbrook (January 22 – February 14, 2019), 2018–19

- Most consecutive 30-point triple-doubles

- 6 by Luka Dončić (February 28 – March 9, 2024), 2023–24

- Most five-by-fives, season

- 3 by Hakeem Olajuwon, 1993–94

- Only 50-50-100 season (min. 100 attempts)

- Tony Snell, 2020–21

=== Points ===
- Highest points per game average, season

- 50.36 by Wilt Chamberlain, 1961–62

- Most points, season

- 4,029 by Wilt Chamberlain, 1961–62

- Most 50-point games, season

- 45 by Wilt Chamberlain, 1961–62

- Most 40-point games, season

- 63 by Wilt Chamberlain, 1961–62

- Most consecutive games with at least 30 points to start a season (excluding Wilt Chamberlain)

- 8 by Luka Dončić, 2022–23

- Most bench points, season

- 1,556 by Ricky Pierce, 1990–91

- Most points by a non-All-Star, season

- 2,244 by World B. Free, averaged 28.77ppg (played 78 gms), 1978–79

- Most fast break points per game since tracking began in 1996–97, season

- 8.2 by Russell Westbrook, 2014–15

- Most paint points per game since tracking began in 1996–97, season

- 22.5 by Shaquille O'Neal, 1999–2000

- Most points off turnovers per game since tracking began in 1996–97, season

- 6.8 by Allen Iverson, 1998–99 and 2002–03

- Most second chance points per game (min. 10 games played) since tracking began in 1996–97, season

- 6.3 by Shaquille O'Neal, 1999–2000

=== Field goals ===
- Highest 3-point field goal percentage (min. 110 attempts), season

- 53.64% by Kyle Korver (59 makes and 110 attempts), 2009–10

- Highest 3-point field goal percentage (min. 50 attempts), season

- 56.9% by Tony Snell (62 makes and 109 attempts), 2020–21

- Highest 2-point field goal percentage (min. 60 games), season

- 76.1% by Mitchell Robinson, 2021–22

- Most 3-point field goals made, season

- 402 by Stephen Curry, 2015–16

- Most 3-point field goals attempted, season

- 1,028 by James Harden, 2018–19

- Most field goals made, season

- 1,597 by Wilt Chamberlain, 1961–62

- Most field goals attempted, season

- 3,159 by Wilt Chamberlain, 1961–62

- Most field goals missed, season

- 1,562 by Wilt Chamberlain, 1961–62

- Most 2-point field goals made, season

- 1,597 by Wilt Chamberlain, 1961–62

- Most 2-point field goals attempted, season

- 3,159 by Wilt Chamberlain, 1961–62

- Most 2-point field goals missed, season

- 1,562 by Wilt Chamberlain, 1961–62

- Fastest to make 150 3-pointers in a season

- Stephen Curry accomplishing the feat in 28 games on December 17, 2021, 2021–22

- Most 3-point field goals made by a player off the bench in a season

- 220 by Payton Pritchard (as a reserve), 2024–25 (active)

- Most 3-point field goals made by a center, season

- 187 by Brook Lopez, 2018–19

- Most 3-point field goals attempted by a center, season

- 512 by Brook Lopez, 2018–19

=== Free throws ===
- Highest free throw percentage, season

- 98.05% by José Calderón, 2008–09

- Most free throws made, season

- 840 by Jerry West, 1965–66

- Most free throws attempted, season

- 1,363 by Wilt Chamberlain, 1961–62

- Most free throws made off the bench, season

- 431 by Detlef Schrempf, 1990–91

- Most minutes played in a season without making a free throw

- 491 minutes (in 34 games) by Josh Childress of the Phoenix Suns, 2011–12. He went 0-2 from the free-throw line

=== Rebounds ===
- Most rebounds, season

- 2,149 by Wilt Chamberlain, 1960–61

- Highest rebounds per game average, season

- 27.2 by Wilt Chamberlain, 1960–61

- Most offensive rebounds (since tracking began in 1973–74), season

- 587 by Moses Malone, 1978–79

- Most defensive rebounds (since tracking began in 1973–74), season

- 1,111 by Kareem Abdul-Jabbar, 1975–76

- Highest defensive rebounds per game average, season

- 13.7 by Elvin Hayes, 1973–74

- Highest total rebound percentage, season

- 29.73% by Dennis Rodman, 1994–95

- Highest offensive rebound percentage, season

- 20.83% by Dennis Rodman, 1994–95

- Highest defensive rebound percentage, season

- 37.98% by Reggie Evans, 2012–13

- Most total rebounds off the bench, season

- 815 by Roy Tarpley, 1987–88

- Most offensive rebounds off the bench, season

- 311 by Jayson Williams, 1995–96

- Most rebounds by a non-All-Star, season

- 1,402 by Nate Thurmond, averaging 19.7rpg, 1968–69

- Most deferred rebound chances per game (min. 10 games) since tracking began in 2013–14, season

- 1.8 by Joel Embiid (2013–14) and Domantas Sabonis (2023–24)

=== Assists ===
- Most assists, season

- 1,164 by John Stockton, 1989–90

- Highest assists per game, season

- 14.54 by John Stockton, 1989–90

- Highest assist percentage, season

- 57.48% by John Stockton, 1990–91

- Highest assists per game by Center position, season

- 10.2 assists per game by Nikola Jokić, 2024–25

- Most assists by Center position, season

- 716 assists by Nikola Jokić, 2024–25

- Most assists off the bench, season

- 642 by John Stockton, 1986–87

- Most assists by a non-All-Star, season

- 1,128 by John Stockton, averaging 13.8apg, 1987–88

- Most screen assists per game (since tracking began 2016–17), season

- 7.0 by Domantas Sabonis, 2019–20

- Most secondary assists per game (since tracking began 2013–14), season

- 1.5 by Chris Paul, 2014–15

- Most potential assists per game (since tracking began 2013–14), season

- 22.7 by Rajon Rondo, 2015–16

=== Steals ===
- Most steals, season

- 301 by Alvin Robertson, 1985–86

- Highest steals per game average, season

- 3.67 by Alvin Robertson, 1985–86

- Most steals by a center, season

- 213 by Hakeem Olajuwon, 1988–89

- Most steals off the bench, season

- 186 by Nate McMillan, 1993–94

- Most deflections per game (min. 50 games) since tracking began 2016–17, season

- 4.2 by Robert Covington (2016–17) and Fred VanVleet (2019–20)

- Most loose balls recovered per game (min. 50 games) since tracking began 2016–17, season

- 2.1 by Paul George (2018–19) and Russell Westbrook (2017–18)

=== Blocks ===
- Most blocks, season

- 456 by Mark Eaton, 1984–85

- Most blocks per game, season

- 5.56 by Mark Eaton, 1984–85

- Highest block percentage, season

- 10.81% by Manute Bol, 1988–89 and 1986–87

- Most blocks by a guard, season

- 131 by Michael Jordan, 1987–88

- Most blocks off the bench, season

- 327 by Manute Bol, 1988–89

=== Advanced stats ===
- Highest value over replacement player (VORP), season

- 12.47 by Michael Jordan, 1987–88

- Highest player efficiency rating (PER), season

- 32.85 by Nikola Jokić, 2021–22

- Highest usage percentage, season

- 41.65% by Russell Westbrook, 2016–17

- Highest defensive win shares (DWS), season

- 15.96 by Bill Russell, 1963–64

- Highest offensive win shares (OWS), season

- 18.31 by Kareem Abdul-Jabbar, 1971–72

- Highest win shares per 48 minutes (WS/48), season

- .3399 by Kareem Abdul-Jabbar, 1971–72

- Highest offensive rating (points produced per 100 possessions), season

- 147.40 by Kevon Looney, 2022–23

- Lowest defensive rating (points allowed per 100 possessions), season

- 87.48 by Ben Wallace, 2003–04

- Highest floor impact counter (FIC), season

- 2,051.1 by Michael Jordan, 1988–89

- Highest plus/minus (since tracking began 1996–97), season

- +1,073 by Draymond Green, 2015–16

- Lowest plus/minus (since tracking began 1996–97), season

- -756 by Dean Garrett, 1997–98

- Highest Box plus/minus (BPM), season

- 13.72 by Nikola Jokić, 2021–22

- Highest offensive plus/minus, season

- 10.35 by Stephen Curry, 2015–16

- Highest defensive plus/minus, season

- 5.54 by Nate McMillan, 1993–94

- Highest real plus/minus (RPM) since tracking began 1996–97, season

- 11.78 by Nikola Jokić, 2021–22

- Highest player impact estimate (PIE) since tracking began 1996–97, season

- 23.9 by Giannis Antetokounmpo, 2019–20

- Highest win probability added (WPA) since tracking began 1996–97, season

- 11.08 by DeMar DeRozan, 2021–22

- Highest overall RAPTOR WAR since tracking began 2013-14

- 26.7 by Stephen Curry, 2015–16

- Highest value over replacement player (VORP) by a non-All-Star, season

- 7.3 by Charles Barkley, 1985–86

- Highest box plus/minus by a non-All-Star, season

- 9.0 by Kareem Abdul-Jabbar, 1977–78

- Highest player efficiency rating by a non-All-Star, season

- 29.2 by Kareem Abdul-Jabbar, 1977–78

- Highest assist-to-turnover ratio (min. 200 assists), season

- 7.35 (485 assists & 66 turnovers) by Tyus Jones, 2023–24

=== Other ===
- Most game-winning buzzer-beaters, season

- 3 by Gilbert Arenas, 2006–07

- Most turnovers, season

- 464 by James Harden, 2016–17

- Most turnovers off the bench, season

- 203 by Thurl Bailey, 1988–89

- Most dunks (since tracking began in 2000), season

- 306 by Rudy Gobert, 2018–19

- Most technical fouls, season

- 41 by Rasheed Wallace, 2000–01

- Most personal fouls, season

- 386 by Darryl Dawkins, 1983–84

- Most disqualifications (foul outs or ejections), season

- 26 by Don Meineke, 1952–53

- Most consecutive disqualifications, season

- 6 by Don Boven, 1951–52

- Most teams played for in a season

- 5 by Bobby Jones (2007–08; Denver Nuggets, Memphis Grizzlies, Houston Rockets, Miami Heat, San Antonio Spurs)

- Most wedgies (basketball stuck between rim and backboard) since tracking began in 2014, season

- 3 by Ed Davis (2017–18), Eric Gordon (2022–23), and Terry Rozier (2023–24)

- Only players with two backboard shattering incidents in a season

- Shaquille O'Neal vs. the New Jersey Nets on April 23, 1993, and vs. the Phoenix Suns on February 7, 1993
- Darryl Dawkins (before breakaway rims) vs. the Kings on November 13, 1979 and again 3 weeks later

- Only player with a higher 3-point percentage than free throw percentage, season

- Bruce Bowen shot 44.1% from 3-pt range and 40.4% from the free-throw line in 2002–03

- Only player with over 200 blocks and 200 steals in a season

- Hakeem Olajuwon (282 blocks, 213 steals) (1988–89)

- Only player with at least 75 threes, 150 assists, 150 blocks in a season

- Victor Wembanyama on February 23, 2024, achieving the feat in the first 48 games

- Only players with at least 100 threes and 200 blocks in a season

- Victor Wembanyama (2023–24) and Raef LaFrentz (2001–02)

- Only player with 200 three-pointers and 700 free throws made in a season

- James Harden, 2014–15

- Only player with 2,000 points, 900 assists, 600 rebounds in a season

- James Harden with the Houston Rockets, 2016–17

- Only player with 2,000 points, 1,000 rebounds, 500 assists in a season

- Nikola Jokić with the Denver Nuggets, 2021–22

- Only player with 2,000 points, 1,000 rebounds, 100 three-pointers made in a season

- Karl-Anthony Towns with the Minnesota Timberwolves, 2016–17

- Only player with 100 dunks and 200 3-pointers in a season

- Lauri Markkanen, 2022–23

- Only player to average 20 points, 10 assists, 4 rebounds, 2 steals, 0.5 blocks in a season

- John Wall with the Washington Wizards, 2016–17

- Only players to average over 30 points and 10 assists per game in a season

- Oscar Robertson (Cincinnati Royals, 1961–62, 1963–64, 1964–65, 1965–66, 1966–67)
- Nate Archibald (Kansas City–Omaha Kings, 1972–73)
- Russell Westbrook (Oklahoma City Thunder, 2016–17)

- Only player to finish Top 20 in 5 major stats categories, season

- Giannis Antetokounmpo with the Milwaukee Bucks, 2016–17

- Only player to average 30 points, 5 rebounds, 5 assists, five 3-pointers per game in a season

- Stephen Curry, 2015–16 and 2020–21

- Only player to join the 50–40–90 club and win the Scoring Title in the same season

- Stephen Curry, 2015–16

- Only player to lead the league in steals per game and free throw percentage in the same season

- Stephen Curry, 2015–16

- Only player to lead the league in blocks, rebounding, field goal percentage in the same season

- Dwight Howard (averaging 2.8 bpg, 13.2 rpg, 62.1 fg%), 2009–10

- Only players to lead the league in blocks and rebounding in the same season

- Kareem Abdul-Jabbar (1975–76), Bill Walton (1976–77), Hakeem Olajuwon (1989–90), Ben Wallace (2001–02), and Dwight Howard (2008–09, 2009–10)

- Only players to lead the league in points and assists in the same season

- Nate Archibald (Kansas City-Omaha Kings, 1972–73), and Trae Young (Atlanta Hawks, 2021-22)

- Only players to lead the league in points and steals in the same season

- Michael Jordan (1987–88, 1989–90, 1992–93), James Harden (2019–20), Allen Iverson (twice)

- Only player to lead the league in assists per game and steals per game in the same season, three times

- Chris Paul (2007–08, 2008–09, 2013–14)

- Only player to average 30 points on 50–40–90 splits in a season

- Stephen Curry, 2015–16

- Only player to average 30 points with a 40% 3-point percentage and 90% free throw percentage in a season

- Stephen Curry, 2015–16 and 2020–21

== Individual game records ==
=== Points ===
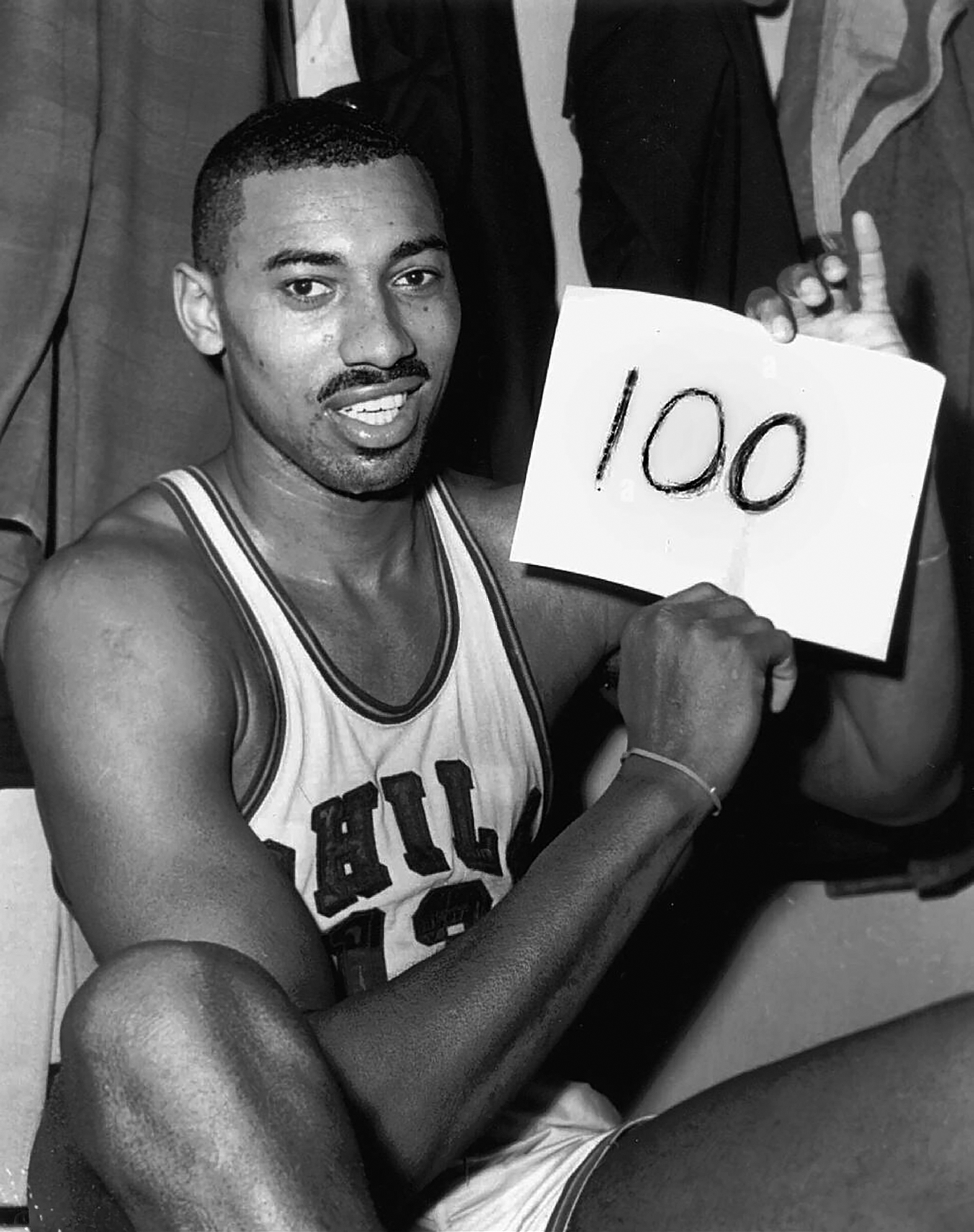
Wilt Chamberlain holds a sign with the number "100" after his record-setting 100-point game in 1962.

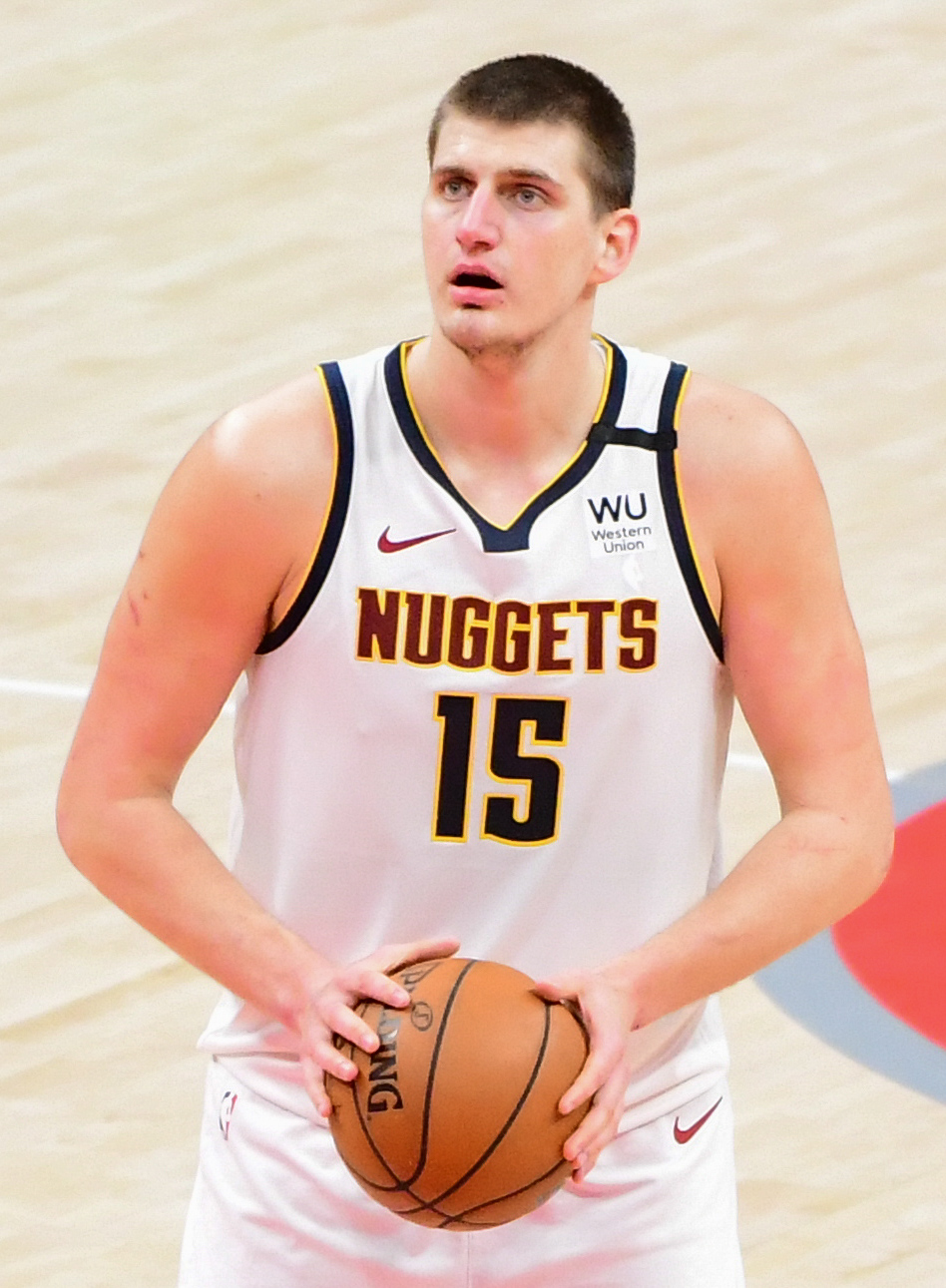
Nikola Jokić recorded the most points in a triple-double with 61.

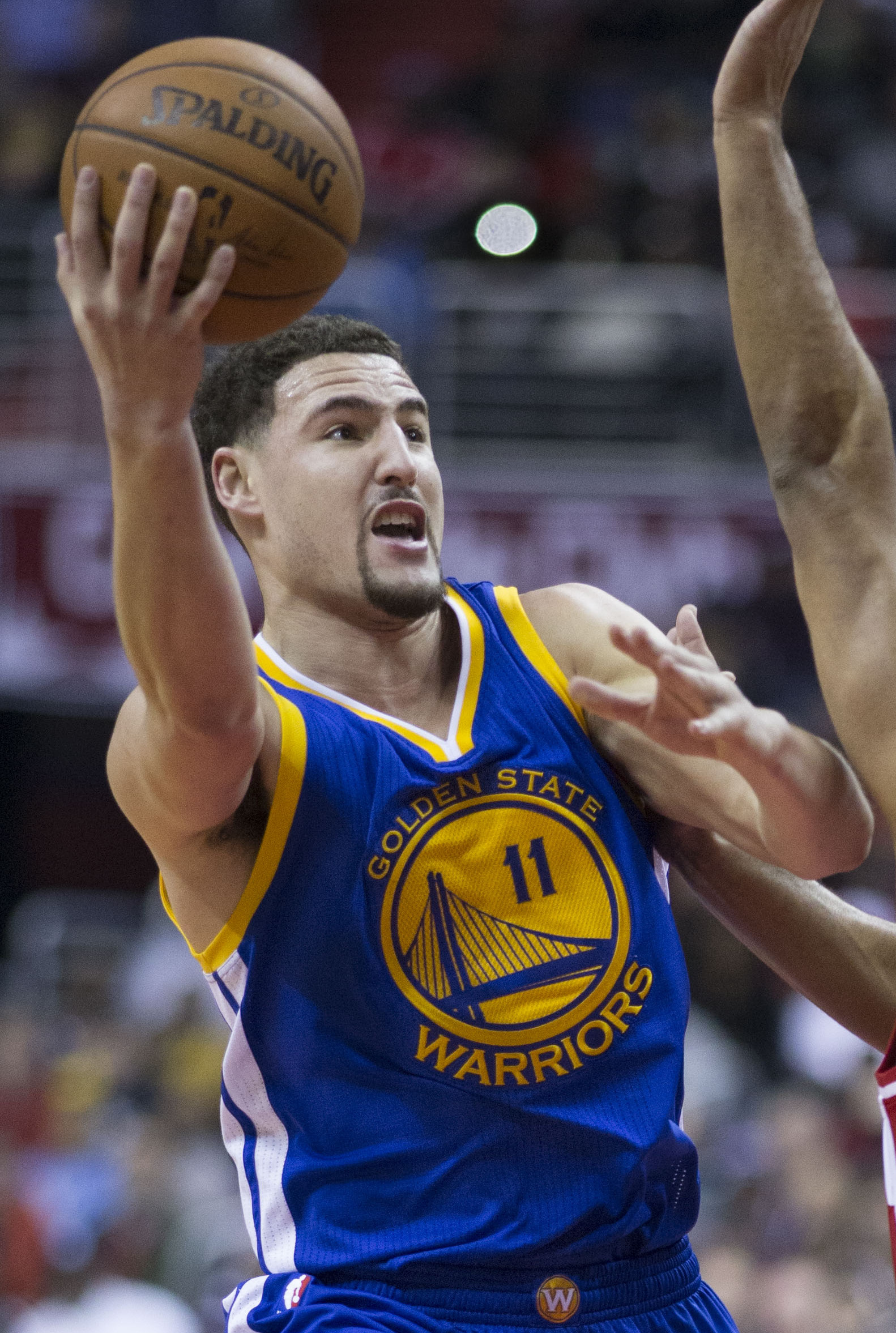
Klay Thompson scored a record 37 points in a single quarter in 2015.

- Most points in a game

- 100 by Wilt Chamberlain, Philadelphia Warriors (vs. New York Knicks) on March 2, 1962

- Most points in a half

- 59 by Wilt Chamberlain, Philadelphia Warriors (vs. New York Knicks) on March 2, 1962 (2nd half)

- Most points in a first half

- 53 by George Gervin and David Thompson on April 9, 1978

- Most points in a quarter

- 37 by Klay Thompson in 3rd quarter, Golden State Warriors (vs. Sacramento Kings) on January 23, 2015

- Most points in the first quarter

- 34 by Kevin Love, Cleveland Cavaliers (vs. Portland Trail Blazers) on November 23, 2016

- Most points in an overtime period

- 18 by Nikola Jokić, Denver Nuggets (vs. Minnesota Timberwolves) on December 25, 2025

- Most points in a triple-double

- 61 by Nikola Jokić vs the Minnesota Timberwolves on April 1, 2025

- Fewest points in a triple-double and only non-points triple-double

- 4 by Draymond Green with 12 rebounds, 10 assists, 10 steals, and 5 blocks vs. the Grizzlies on February 10, 2017

- Most consecutive points by single player on team

- 26 by Carmelo Anthony, Denver Nuggets (vs. Minnesota Timberwolves), December 10, 2008

- the post-season record is 25 by LeBron James

- Most points without a free throw attempted

- 50 by Jamal Murray vs. the Cleveland Cavaliers on February 19, 2021

- Most points by an undrafted player in a game

- 54 by Fred VanVleet vs the Orlando Magic on February 2, 2021

- Most bench points in a game

- 51 by Jamal Crawford vs. Mavericks on April 9, 2019

- Most points in under 30 minutes of play

- 60 by Klay Thompson vs. the Indiana Pacers on December 5, 2016

- Most points in under 20 minutes of play

- 34 by Sandro Mamukelashvili in 19 minutes vs the New York Knicks on March 19, 2025

- Most points without a single paint point in a game

- 50 by Carmelo Anthony vs. the Miami Heat on April 2, 2013

- Most points in a game without a 3-point field goal made (since its introduction in 1979–80)

- 64 by Giannis Antetokounmpo vs. the Indiana Pacers on December 13, 2023

- Most points in debut game with new team

- 50 by Kyrie Irving vs. Minnesota Timberwolves on October 23, 2019

- Most points in debut game against a former team

- 41 by Anthony Davis vs. New Orleans Pelicans on November 27, 2019 (Davis then had 46 in 2nd game against former team)

- Most points in first road game against a former team

- 50 by John Williamson with Nets vs Pacers in 1978

- Most points in a loss

- 78 by Wilt Chamberlain vs. the Los Angeles Lakers, 151-147 (3OT)

- Most points in a road game

- 73 by Wilt Chamberlain vs the New York Knicks on November 16, 1962

- Most points in a game on Christmas Day

- 60 by Bernard King vs. New Jersey Nets on December 25, 1984

- Most points on MLK Day

- 61 by Damian Lillard vs. the Golden State Warriors on January 20, 2020

- Most points without an assist in a game

- 73 by Wilt Chamberlain vs. the Chicago Packers on January 13, 1962

- Most points without a rebound in a game

- 61 by Kobe Bryant vs. the Knicks on February 2, 2009

- Most points without a rebound, assist, block, steal in a game

- 37 by Allan Houston vs. the Timberwolves on December 2, 2000

- Most points without a rebound, assist, block, steal, turnover in a game

- 29 by Michael Redd vs. the Houston Rockets on February 20, 2002

- Most points without a personal foul in a game

- 73 by Wilt Chamberlain vs. the New York Knicks on November 16, 1962

- Most points in a game without a 3-point field goal attempted or free throw attempted

- 48 by Hakeem Olajuwon, Houston Rockets (vs. Denver Nuggets) on January 30, 1997

- Most points without a field goal attempted

- 8 points by Boban Marjanovic on April 3, 2018
- 8 points by Jarron Collins on December 23, 2005
- 8 points by Clint McDaniel on March 20, 1996
- 8 points by Tom LaGarde on October 19, 1977

- Most points without a field goal made

- 15 points by Darrick Martin vs. the Sacramento Kings on December 14, 1996

- The pre-season record is 17 points by Corey Maggette.

=== Field goals ===
- Most field goals made in a game

- 36 by Wilt Chamberlain, Philadelphia Warriors (vs. New York Knicks) on March 2, 1962

- Most field goals attempted in a game

- 63 by Wilt Chamberlain, Philadelphia Warriors (vs. New York Knicks) on March 2, 1962

- Most field goals missed in a game

- 42 by Joe Fulks, Philadelphia Warriors (vs. Providence Steamrollers) on March 18, 1948 (13/55)

- Most field goals made in a half

- 22 by Wilt Chamberlain, Philadelphia Warriors (vs. New York Knicks) on March 2, 1962 (2nd)

- Most field goals attempted in a half

- 37 by Wilt Chamberlain, Philadelphia Warriors (vs. New York Knicks) on March 2, 1962 (2nd)

- Most field goals made in a quarter

- 13 by David Thompson, Denver Nuggets (vs. Detroit Pistons) on April 9, 1978 (1st)
- 13 by Klay Thompson, Golden State Warriors (vs. Sacramento Kings) on January 23, 2015 (3rd)

- Most field goals attempted in a quarter

- 21 by Wilt Chamberlain, Philadelphia Warriors (vs. New York Knicks) on March 2, 1962 (4th)

- Most field goals made in a game, no misses

- 18 by Wilt Chamberlain, Philadelphia 76ers (vs. Baltimore Bullets) on February 24, 1967

- Most field goals attempted in a game, none made

- 17 by Tim Hardaway, Golden State Warriors (at Minnesota Timberwolves) on December 27, 1991

- Most 2-point field goals made in a game

- 36 by Wilt Chamberlain, Philadelphia Warriors (vs. New York Knicks) on March 2, 1962

- Most 2-point field goals attempted in a game

- 63 by Wilt Chamberlain, Philadelphia Warriors (vs. New York Knicks) on March 2, 1962

- Most 2-point field goals missed in a game

- 42 by Joe Fulks, Philadelphia Warriors (vs. Providence Steamrollers) on March 18, 1948 (13/55)

- Most 3-point field goals made in a game

- 14 by Klay Thompson, Golden State Warriors (at Chicago Bulls) on October 29, 2018 (14/24)

- Most 3-point field goals attempted in a game

- 24 by Klay Thompson, Golden State Warriors (at Chicago Bulls) on October 29, 2018 (14/24)

- Most 3-point field goals missed in a game

- 16 by Damon Stoudamire, Portland Trail Blazers (at Golden State Warriors) on April 15, 2005 (5/21)
- 16 by James Harden, Houston Rockets (at Orlando Magic) on January 13, 2019 (1/17)
- 16 by James Harden, Houston Rockets (vs. Sacramento Kings) on March 30, 2019 (7/23)
- 16 by James Harden, Houston Rockets (vs. New Orleans Pelicans) on October 26, 2019 (2/18)
- 16 by James Harden, Houston Rockets (at San Antonio Spurs) on December 3, 2019 (4/20)
- 16 by James Harden, Houston Rockets (at Atlanta Hawks) on January 8, 2020 (4/20)
- 16 by James Harden, Houston Rockets (vs. Oklahoma City Thunder) on January 20, 2020 (1/17)

- Most 3-point field goals made in a game, no misses

- 9 by Latrell Sprewell, New York Knicks (vs. Los Angeles Clippers) on February 4, 2003
- 9 by Ben Gordon, Chicago Bulls (vs. Washington Wizards) on April 14, 2006
- 9 by Ben Gordon, Detroit Pistons (at Denver Nuggets) on March 21, 2012
- 9 by Jalen Brunson vs. the Phoenix Suns on December 15, 2023

- Most consecutive 3-point field goals made to start a game

- 10 by Ty Lawson, Denver Nuggets (vs. Minnesota Timberwolves) on April 9, 2011 (10/11)
- 10 by Klay Thompson, Golden State Warriors (at Los Angeles Lakers) on January 21, 2019 (10/11)

- Most 3-point field goals attempted in a game, none made

- 15 by Dalano Banton, Portland Trail Blazers (at Sacramento Kings) on April 14, 2024

- Most 3-point field goals made in a half

- 10 by Chandler Parsons, Houston Rockets (vs. Memphis Grizzlies) on January 24, 2014 (10/11)
- 10 by Klay Thompson, Golden State Warriors (at Chicago Bulls) on October 29, 2018 (10/14)

- Most 3-point field goals made in a half, no misses

- 8 by Jalen Brunson vs. the Phoenix Suns on December 15, 2023

- Most 3-point field goals made in a quarter

- 9 by Klay Thompson, Golden State Warriors (vs. Sacramento Kings) on January 23, 2015 (9/9)

- Most 3-point field goals attempted in a quarter, no misses

- 9 by Klay Thompson, Golden State Warriors (vs. Sacramento Kings) on January 23, 2015 (9/9)

- Most 3-point field goals made in a game by reserve player

- 12 by Donyell Marshall, Toronto Raptors (vs. Philadelphia 76ers) on March 13, 2005

- Most 3-point field goals made in a game by a center

- 9 by Aron Baynes vs. the Portland Trail Blazers on March 6, 2020

- Most 3-pointers made in a game while not making a 2-point field goal

- 11 by Bojan Bogdanović, Utah Jazz (vs. Oklahoma City Thunder) on March 6, 2022

- Most 3-point field goals made in a game without a free throw attempt

- 12 by Klay Thompson vs. the Oklahoma City Thunder on February 6, 2023
- 12 by Donyell Marshall vs. the Philadelphia 76ers on March 13, 2005

- Highest true shooting percentage in a 60-point performance or greater

- 91.2% by Luka Dončić (73 points) vs. the Atlanta Hawks on January 26, 2024 (25/33 total FG)

- Most field goals attempted in a game without a point

- 14 by Dino Radja, Boston Celtics (at San Antonio Spurs) on December 26, 1993
- 14 by Belus Smawley on November 20, 1947

- Most 3-point field goals made in a game on Christmas Day

- 8 by Patty Mills, 2021, Grayson Allen vs. the Dallas Mavericks on December 25, 2023, Luka Dončić vs. the Phoenix Suns on December 25, 2023.

=== Free throws ===
- Most free throws made in a game

- 36 by Bam Adebayo, Miami Heat (vs. Washington Wizards) on March 10, 2026 (36/43)

- Most free throws made in a game, no misses

- 24 by James Harden, Houston Rockets (vs. San Antonio Spurs) on December 3, 2019

- Note: DeMar DeRozan made 24 consecutive FTs, then intentionally missed his 25th FT on March 4, 2016

- Most free throws attempted in a game, none made

- 11 by Shaquille O'Neal, Los Angeles Lakers (vs. Seattle SuperSonics) on December 8, 2000

- Most consecutive free throws missed in a game

- 13 by Chris Dudley vs. the Indiana Pacers on April 14, 1990

- Most free throws attempted in a game

- 43 by Bam Adebayo, Miami Heat (vs. Washington Wizards) on March 10, 2026 (36/43)

- Most free throws missed in a game

- 23 by Andre Drummond, Detroit Pistons (at Houston Rockets) on January 20, 2016 (13/36)

- Most free throws made in a half

- 24 by Bam Adebayo, Miami Heat (vs. Washington Wizards) on March 10, 2026

- Most free throws attempted in a half

- 29 by Bam Adebayo, Miami Heat (vs. Washington Wizards) on March 10, 2026 (24/29)

- Most free throws made in a quarter

- 18 by Anthony Davis, Los Angeles Lakers (vs Memphis Grizzlies) on October 29, 2019 (3rd Quarter) going 18-for-18

- Most free throws attempted in a quarter

- 24 by Ben Simmons, Philadelphia 76ers (vs. Washington Wizards) on November 29, 2017

- Most free throws made by a bench player in a game

- 22 by Sleepy Floyd vs. the Warriors on February 3, 1991

- Most free throws made in a game without a field goal made

- 15 by Darrick Martin, Los Angeles Clippers (vs. Sacramento Kings) on December 14, 1996

- Most free throw attempts in a game without a rebound, assist, steal, or block

- 14 by Jeff Malone vs. the New York Knicks on November 13, 1987

- Most free throw attempts in a game without a rebound, assist, steal, block, or turnover

- 9 by Marcus Thornton vs. the New Orleans Pelicans on January 12, 2015
- 9 by Casey Jacobsen vs. the Utah Jazz on January 12, 2003

- Most free throw attempts in a game without a point

- 6 by Larry Smith vs. the Golden State Warriors on April 11, 1991
- 6 by Kenny Green vs. the Dallas Mavericks on March 30, 1986
- 6 by Billy Paultz vs. the Utah Jazz on March 14, 1981

- Most free throws made in a game without a personal foul

- 23 by Dwyane Wade vs. the Cleveland Cavaliers on February 1, 2007

=== Rebounds ===
- Most rebounds in a game

- 55 by Wilt Chamberlain, Philadelphia Warriors (vs. Boston Celtics) on November 24, 1960

- Most rebounds in a half

- 32 by Bill Russell, Boston Celtics (vs. Philadelphia Warriors) on November 16, 1957

- Most rebounds in a quarter

- 18 by Nate Thurmond, San Francisco Warriors (at Baltimore Bullets) on February 28, 1965

- Note: the post-season record is 19 by Bill Russell

- Most offensive rebounds in a game (since tracking began in 1973–74)

- 21 by Moses Malone vs. Seattle SuperSonics on February 11, 1982

- Most defensive rebounds in a game (since tracking began in 1973–74)

- 29 by Kareem Abdul-Jabbar, Los Angeles Lakers (vs. Detroit Pistons) on December 14, 1975

- Most offensive rebounds in a half

- 13 by Charles Barkley, Philadelphia 76ers (vs. New York Knicks) on March 4, 1987

- Most defensive rebounds in a half

- 18 by Swen Nater, San Diego Clippers (vs. Denver Nuggets) on December 14, 1979

- Most offensive rebounds in a quarter

- 11 by Charles Barkley, Philadelphia 76ers (vs. New York Knicks) on March 4, 1987

- Most defensive rebounds in a quarter

- 13 by Happy Hairston, Los Angeles Lakers (vs. Philadelphia 76ers) on November 15, 1974

- Most rebounds in a triple-double

- 38 by Wilt Chamberlain vs. the San Francisco Warriors on March 2, 1967
- 38 by Maurice Stokes vs. the Syracuse Nationals on January 14, 1956

- Most rebounds without a point in a game

- 28 by Dennis Rodman vs. the Hornets on December 1, 1993

- Note: second, third, and fourth most is also Dennis Rodman

- Most rebounds as a bench player in a game

- 25 by Dennis Rodman vs. the Indiana Pacers on January 22, 1995
- 25 by John Henson vs. the Orlando Magic on April 10, 2013
- 25 by JJ Hickson vs. the Portland Trail Blazers on February 25, 2014

- Most offensive rebounds as a bench player in a game

- 15 by JJ Hickson vs. the Portland Trail Blazers on February 25, 2014

- Most offensive rebounds in a game without a field goal attempt

- 8 by Joel Anthony, Miami Heat (vs. Atlanta Hawks) on January 18, 2011

- Most offensive rebounds in a game without a defensive rebound

- 12 by Popeye Jones, Dallas Mavericks (at Los Angeles Lakers) on March 10, 1994

- Most defensive rebounds in a game without an offensive rebound

- 21 by Dirk Nowitzki, Dallas Mavericks (vs. Sacramento Kings) on February 23, 2002

- Most rebounds in a game without a point, assist, steal, or block

- 20 by Dennis Rodman, San Antonio Spurs (at Utah Jazz) on December 13, 1993

- Most rebounds in a game without a point, assist, steal, block, or turnover

- 13 by Dennis Rodman vs. the Sacramento Kings on November 25, 1990

- Most rebounds in a game without a free throw attempt

- 34 by Rony Seikaly vs. the Washington Bullets on March 3, 1993

- Most rebounds in a game without a field goal attempt or free throw attempt

- 20 by Dennis Rodman vs. the Sacramento Kings on January 25, 1994

- Most rebounds in a game without a personal foul

- 41 by Wilt Chamberlain vs. the Detroit Pistons on October 26, 1962

- Most rebounds in a game on Christmas Day

- 36 by Wilt Chamberlain (in 1961)

=== Assists ===
- Most assists in a game

- 30 by Scott Skiles, Orlando Magic (vs. Denver Nuggets) on December 30, 1990

- Most assists in a half

- 19 by Bob Cousy, Boston Celtics (vs. Minneapolis Lakers) on February 27, 1959

- Most assists in a quarter

- 14 by John Lucas, San Antonio Spurs (vs. Denver Nuggets) on April 15, 1984
- 14 by Steve Blake, Portland Trail Blazers (vs. Los Angeles Clippers) on February 22, 2009

- Most assists in a triple-double

- 24 by Russell Westbrook vs. the Indiana Pacers on May 3, 2021
- 24 by Russell Westbrook vs. the San Antonio Spurs on January 10, 2019
- 24 by Rajon Rondo vs. New York Knicks on October 29, 2010
- 24 by Isiah Thomas vs. Washington Bullets on February 7, 1985

- Most assists without a turnover in a game

- 20 by Tyrese Haliburton vs. the Chicago Bulls on December 28, 2023
- 20 by Chris Paul vs. New Orleans Pelicans on December 10, 2016
- 20 by Rickey Green vs. Atlanta Hawks on February 14, 1984
- 20 by John Lucas II vs. Kansas City Kings on December 23, 1983
- 20 by Kevin Porter vs. Denver Nuggets on April 5, 1978

- Most assists without a point in a game

- 24 by John Lucas II vs. the Denver Nuggets on April 15, 1984

- Most assists without a point or turnover in a game

- 14 by Fat Lever vs. the Los Angeles Clippers on December 11, 1985

- Most assists in a game without a steal or block

- 27 by Geoff Huston vs. the Golden State Warriors on January 27, 1982

- Most assists in a game without a rebound, steal, or block

- 21 by Brandon Jennings vs. the Orlando Magic on January 21, 2015
- 21 by Kevin Porter vs. the Houston Rockets on February 6, 1979

- Most assists in a game without a point, rebound, steal, or block

- 11 by Muggsy Bogues vs. the San Antonio Spurs on February 25, 1989
- 11 by Brian Taylor on February 6, 1981

- Most assists in a game without a field goal attempt

- 13 by Jacque Vaughn, New Jersey Nets (at Philadelphia 76ers) on April 18, 2006

- Most assists in a game without a free throw attempt

- 29 by Kevin Porter vs. the Houston Rockets on February 24, 1978

- Most assists in a loss

- 28 by Guy Rodgers vs. the St. Louis Hawks on March 14, 1963

- Most assists in a game on Christmas Day

- 18 by Guy Rodgers (in 1966) and Nate Archibald (in 1972)

=== Steals ===
- Most steals in a game

- 11 by Larry Kenon, San Antonio Spurs (at Kansas City Kings) on December 26, 1976
- 11 by Kendall Gill, New Jersey Nets (vs. Miami Heat) on April 3, 1999

- Most steals in a half

- 9 by T. J. McConnell, Indiana Pacers (vs. Cleveland Cavaliers) on March 3, 2021

- Most steals in a quarter

- 8 by Fat Lever, Denver Nuggets (vs. Indiana Pacers) on March 9, 1985

- Most steals without a point or turnover in a game

- 7 by Ryan Bowen vs. the Sacramento Kings on December 6, 2002

- Most steals without a turnover in a game

- 11 by Kendall Gill, New Jersey Nets (vs. Miami Heat) on April 3, 1999

- Most steals without an assist in a game

- 8 by Jerome Williams vs. the Chicago Bulls on February 26, 2003
- 8 by Foots Walker vs. the New York Knicks on October 25, 1977

- Most steals in a game without a rebound or block

- 9 by Mookie Blaylock vs. the Houston Rockets on February 17, 1997

- Most steals in a game without a rebound, assist or block

- 5 by Shaun Livingston vs. the Chicago Bulls on March 3, 2014
- 5 by Mike Evans vs. the Detroit Pistons on January 18, 1988
- 5 by Foots Walker vs. the New Orleans Jazz on February 1, 1976

- Most steals in a game without a point, rebound, assist or block

- 4 by Stacey Augmon vs. the Utah Jazz on February 22, 2001

- Most steals in a game without a field goal attempt or free throw attempt

- 5 by Ben Wallace vs. the Orlando Magic on January 2, 2012

- Most steals in a game without a personal foul

- 10 by T. J. McConnell, Indiana Pacers (vs. Cleveland Cavaliers) on March 3, 2021

- Most steals in a game on Christmas Day

- 7 by Kyrie Irving (in 2016)

=== Blocks ===
- Most blocks in a game

- 17 by Elmore Smith, Los Angeles Lakers (vs. Portland Trail Blazers) on October 28, 1973

- Most blocks in a half

- 11 by Elmore Smith, Los Angeles Lakers (vs. Portland Trail Blazers) on October 28, 1973
- 11 by George T. Johnson, San Antonio Spurs (vs. Golden State Warriors) on February 24, 1981
- 11 by Manute Bol, Washington Bullets (vs. Milwaukee Bucks) on December 12, 1985

- Most blocks in a quarter

- 8 by Manute Bol, Washington Bullets (vs. Milwaukee Bucks) on December 12, 1985
- 8 by Manute Bol, Washington Bullets (vs. Indiana Pacers) on February 26, 1987
- 8 by Dikembe Mutombo, Philadelphia 76ers (at Chicago Bulls) on December 1, 2001
- 8 by Erick Dampier, Golden State Warriors (vs. Los Angeles Clippers) on April 17, 2002

- Most blocks without a point in a game

- 10 by Manute Bol on March 12, 1990, and on February 25, 1986

- Most blocks without a point or turnover in a game

- 10 by Manute Bol vs. the Indiana Pacers on February 25, 1986

- Most blocks without a rebound or assist in a game

- 10 by Calvin Booth, Seattle SuperSonics (vs. Cleveland Cavaliers) on January 13, 2004

- Most blocks without a turnover in a game

- 15 by Manute Bol vs. the Atlanta Hawks on January 25, 1986

- Most blocks in a game without a point, assist, rebound, steal, or turnover

- 5 by Keon Clark vs. the Sacramento Kings on February 23, 2001

- Most blocks without a field goal attempt in a game

- 10 by Manute Bol vs. the Los Angeles Clippers on March 12, 1990

- Most blocks without a free throw attempt in a game

- 15 by Manute Bol, Washington Bullets (vs. Indiana Pacers) on February 26, 1987

- Most blocks without a personal foul in a game

- 12 by Keon Clark vs. the Atlanta Hawks on March 23, 2001

- Most blocks in a game on Christmas Day

- 8 by DeAndre Jordan (in 2011)

=== Minutes ===
- Most minutes and seconds played in a game

- 69:00 by Dale Ellis, Seattle SuperSonics (at Milwaukee Bucks) on November 9, 1989 (5 OT)

- Most minutes and seconds played without a point, rebound, assist, steal or block

- 28:46 by Joel Anthony vs. Portland Trail Blazers on January 9, 2011

- Most minutes and seconds played without a field goal made

- 48:43 by Greg Ostertag in Utah's win vs. 76ers on January 6, 1998

- Most minutes and seconds played in a game without a point

- 48:13 by Wilson Chandler, Denver Nuggets (at Minnesota Timberwolves) on April 11, 2018

- Most minutes played in a game without a field goal attempt

- 48 by Ben Wallace vs. the Cleveland Cavaliers on March 31, 2007

- Quickest to reach a triple-double

- 14 minutes and 33 seconds by Nikola Jokić, Denver Nuggets (at Milwaukee Bucks) on February 15, 2018.

- Shortest amount of playing time before fouling out

- 2 minutes and 43 seconds by Bubba Wells vs. the Chicago Bulls on December 29, 1997

- Fastest ejection of head coach

- 27 seconds by Phil Jackson vs the 76ers on March 24, 1993
- 63 seconds by Gregg Popovich vs. the Denver Nuggets on April 4, 2019

- Only player to record one turnover in no minutes and seconds played

- Rasual Butler vs. the Los Angeles Lakers on February 12, 2012

- Fastest made 3-pointer to start a game

- 3 seconds (11:57 in the 1st quarter) by Buddy Hield vs. Cleveland Cavaliers on December 29, 2022

=== Turnovers ===
- Most turnovers in a game

- 14 by John Drew, Atlanta Hawks (at New Jersey Nets) on March 1, 1977
- 14 by Jason Kidd, Phoenix Suns (vs. New York Knicks) on November 17, 2000

- Most turnovers in a game without a steal or block

- 14 by Jason Kidd, Phoenix Suns (vs. New York Knicks) on November 17, 2000

- Most turnovers in a game without an assist

- 11 by Ralph Sampson vs. the Celtics on February 10, 1984
- 11 by Jamaal Wilkes vs. the Atlanta Hawks on December 10, 1978

- Most turnovers in a game without a rebound

- 10 by Trae Young vs. the Toronto Raptors on October 31, 2022

- Most turnovers in a game without a rebound or assist

- 8 by Brent Price vs. the New Jersey Nets on February 19, 1996

- Most turnovers in a game without a point

- 9 by John Lucas II vs. the Detroit Pistons on January 10, 1981

- Most turnovers in a game without a field goal attempt

- 9 by James Donaldson vs. the Portland Trail Blazers on November 7, 1986

- Most turnovers in a game without a free throw attempt

- 12 by Kevin Porter vs the Philadelphia 76ers on November 9, 1977

- Most turnovers in a game without a point while fouling out

- 7 by Bimbo Coles, Miami Heat (at Cleveland Cavaliers) on December 17, 1991

- Most turnovers in a game without a field goal attempt or free throw attempt

- 6 by Armon Johnson vs. the Toronto Raptors on November 6, 2010
- 6 by Dennis Rodman vs. the Los Angeles Lakers on January 9, 1994
- 6 by Vlade Divac vs. the Sacramento Kings on April 5, 1990
- 6 by James Ray vs. the Washington Bullets on December 9, 1982

- Most turnovers in a game by a bench player

- 12 by Kevin Porter vs. the Philadelphia 76ers on November 9, 1977

- Most turnovers in a game without a point, rebound, assist, steal, block, field goal attempt, or free throw attempt

- 6 by James Ray vs. the Washington Bullets on December 9, 1982

- Most turnovers in a quarter (since tracking began 2016–17)

- 7 by Nikola Jokić vs. the Oklahoma City Thunder on November 3, 2022 (3rd quarter)

=== Other ===
==== 2 category combination ====
- Only player with a quadruple double-double (40 or more in two of five stats) in a game

- Wilt Chamberlain (8 times): On November 4, 1959 (41pts, 40rebs) - On January 15, 1960 (44pts, 42rebs) - On January 25, 1960 (58pts, 42rebs) - On February 6, 1960 (44pts, 45rebs) - On January 21, 1961 (56pts, 45rebs) - On December 8, 1961 (78pts, 43rebs) - On October 26, 1962 (50pts, 41rebs) - On November 22, 1964 (50pts, 40rebs)

- Only player with at least 70 points and 10 assists in a game

- Donovan Mitchell (71pts, 8rebs, 11asts, 1blk) vs. the Chicago Bulls on January 2, 2023

- Only player with at least 11 rebounds and 24 assists in a game

- Russell Westbrook (14pts, 21rebs, 24asts, 1stl, 1blk) vs. the Indiana Pacers on May 3, 2021
- Russell Westbrook (24pts, 13rebs, 24asts, 2stls) vs. the San Antonio Spurs on January 10, 2019

- Only player with at least 60 points and 3 blocks in a game

- Michael Jordan (61pts, 7rebs, 3asts, 3stls) vs. the Detroit Pistons on March 4, 1987

- Only player with at least 71 points and 1 steal in a game

- Kobe Bryant (81pts, 6rebs, 2asts, 3stls, 1blk) vs. the Toronto Raptors on January 22, 2006

- Only player with at least 10 steals and 5 blocks in a game

- Draymond Green (12rebs, 10asts) vs. the Memphis Grizzlies on February 10, 2017

- Only player with at least 10 three-pointers and 13 assists in a game

- James Harden (15asts) vs. the Golden State Warriors on January 3, 2019

- Only player with at least 70 points while making at least 10 three-pointers

- Damian Lillard vs. the Houston Rockets on February 26, 2023

- Only players with 50 points and at most 1 free throw attempted in a game

- Jamal Murray and Stephen Curry

- Only players with 60 points and at most 6 free throws attempted in a game

- Rick Barry, Stephen Curry, and Jalen Brunson

- Only player responsible, twice, for 90 or more team points (includes assisted pts) in a game

- James Harden on December 31, 2016 (95pts) and November 5, 2017 (91pts)

- Only player with at least 10 three-pointers made and 5 steals in a game

- Stephen Curry (12 three-pointers, 52pts, 10rebs, 8asts, 1blk) on April 1, 2025

==== 3 category combination ====
- Only double-triple-doubles (20/20/20s) in a game (20+ in any 3 stats)

- Wilt Chamberlain had 22 points, 25 rebounds, and 21 assists on February 4, 1968
- Russell Westbrook had 20 points, 20 rebounds, and 21 assists on April 2, 2019
- Nikola Jokić had 31 points, 23 rebounds, and 22 assists on March 7, 2025

- Only player with at least 50 points, 20 rebounds, 5 blocks in a game

- Bob McAdoo (52pts, 22rebs, 2asts, 7blks) vs. the Boston Celtics on February 22, 1974

- Only players with a scoreless double-double

- Josh Giddey had 0 points, 10 rebounds, 10 assists vs. the New Orleans Pelicans on December 26, 2021
- Norm Van Lier had 0 points, 13 assists, 11 rebounds in 1971

- Only player with at least 32 points, 16 rebounds, 18 assists in a game

- Giannis Antetokounmpo (35pts, 17rebs, 20asts, 2stls) vs the Philadelphia 76ers on April 3, 2025

- Only player with at least 70 points, 9 rebounds, 4 assists in a game

- David Robinson (71pts, 14rebs, 5asts, 2blks) vs. the Los Angeles Clippers on April 24, 1994

- Only player with at least 72 points, 8 rebounds, 6 assists in a game

- Luka Dončić (73pts, 10rebs, 7asts, 1stl) vs. the Atlanta Hawks on January 26, 2024

- Only player to record a 60-point, 20 rebound triple-double

- Luka Dončić with 60 points, 21 rebounds, 10 assists in a comeback overtime victory over the New York Knicks

- Only player with 25 point first-half triple-double

- Luka Dončić ended with 40 points, 11 rebounds, 10 assists vs. the Utah Jazz on December 6, 2023

- Only player with at least 12 assists, 21 rebounds, 2 steals in a game

- Nikola Jokić (17pts) vs. the Golden State Warriors on February 13, 2017

- Only player with at least 33 points, 18 rebounds, 16 assists in a game

- Nikola Jokić (35pts, 22rebs, 17asts, 1stl, 2blks) vs. the Sacramento Kings on January 23, 2025

- Only player with 30 points and 7 blocks in 30 minutes or less

- Victor Wembanyama (6rebs, 6asts) in 24:27 (min/sec) vs. the Portland Trail Blazers on December 28, 2023

- Only player with at least 40 points, 15 rebounds, 18 assists in a game

- Oscar Robertson (42pts) vs. the Philadelphia Warriors on February 13, 1962

- Only player with at least 30 points, 15 rebounds, 20 assists in a game

- Oscar Robertson (32pts) vs. the Chicago Packers on December 11, 1961

- Only player with at least 67 points, 15 rebounds, 4 assists in a game

- Michael Jordan (69pts, 18rebs, 6asts, 4stls, 1blk) vs. the Cleveland Cavaliers on March 28, 1990

- Only player with at least 35 points, 20 assists, 10 rebounds in a game

- Russell Westbrook (21asts, 14rebs) vs. the Indiana Pacers on March 29, 2021

- Only player with at least 30 points, 35 rebounds, 1 steal or 1 block in a game

- Moses Malone (33pts, 37rebs, 2asts, 1 stl, 2blks) vs. the New Orleans Jazz on February 9, 1979

- Only player with at least 53 points, 17 rebounds, 3 blocks in a game

- Anthony Davis (55pts, 1ast) vs. the Washington Wizards on December 4, 2022
- Anthony Davis (18rebs, 3asts, 5blks, 1stl) vs. the Phoenix Suns on February 26, 2018

- Only player with at least 40 points and 20 rebounds in 32 minutes or less

- Anthony Davis in 30 minutes and 34 seconds vs Memphis Grizzlies on October 29, 2019

- Only player with at least 40 points, 15 assists, 5 steals in a game

- Chris Paul (42pts, 2rebs, 6stls) vs. the Golden State Warriors on October 31, 2013

- Only player with at least 23 points, 17 assists, 7 steals in a game

- John Stockton (24pts, 19asts, 1reb) vs. the Cleveland Cavaliers on February 11, 1992

- Only player with at least 45 points, 10 rebounds, 8 blocks in a game

- Dwight Howard (19rebs) vs. the Charlotte Bobcats on February 17, 2009

- Only player with at least 60 points, 30 rebounds, 5 assists in a game

- Elgin Baylor (63pts, 31rebs, 7asts) vs. the Philadelphia Warriors on December 8, 1961

- Only player with at least 70 points, 15 rebounds, 4 assists in a game

- Joel Embiid (18rebs, 5asts, 1stl, 1blk) vs. the San Antonio Spurs on January 22, 2024

- Only player with at least 24 assists, 4 rebounds, 6 steals in a game

- Magic Johnson (24pts, 8rebs, 1blk) vs. the Denver Nuggets on November 17, 1989

- Only player with at least 50 points, 15 assists, 15 rebounds in a game

- James Harden (53pts, 16rebs, 17asts) vs. the New York Knicks on December 31, 2016
- Nikola Jokić (56pts, 16rebs, 15asts, 2blks) vs the Minnesota Timberwolves on December 25, 2025

- Only player with at least 51 points, 12 rebounds, 5 steals in a game

- James Harden (61pts, 15rebs, 4asts) vs. the New York Knicks on January 23, 2019

- Only player with at least 11 assists, 22 rebounds, 2 steals in a game

- Fat Lever (20pts) vs. the San Antonio Spurs on April 20, 1990

- Only player with at least 8 assists, 21 rebounds, 5 steals in a game

- George McGinnis (23pts, 10asts, 22rebs) vs. the Portland Trail Blazers on February 24, 1976
- George McGinnis (38pts, 10asts, 6stls) vs. the Buffalo Braves on February 8, 1976

- Only player with at least 22 rebounds, 2 steals, 11 blocks in a game

- Marcus Camby (8pts, 24rebs, 1ast) vs. the Utah Jazz on January 17, 2008

- Only player with at least 19 assists, 9 rebounds, 6 steals in a game

- Rajon Rondo (12pts, 23asts, 10rebs, 1blk) vs. the San Antonio Spurs on January 5, 2011

- Only player with at least 20 assists, 4 rebounds, 7 steals in a game

- Andre Miller (14pts, 22asts, 9stls) vs. the Philadelphia 76ers on December 15, 2001

- Only player with at least 22 points, 14 assists, 8 steals in a game

- Clyde Drexler (26pts, 3rebs) vs. the Indiana Pacers on November 30, 1986

- Only player with at least 35 points, 18 assists, 3 steals in a game

- Baron Davis (36pts, 8rebs) vs. the Sacramento Kings on November 16, 2006

- Only player with at least 56 points, 5 steals, 1 block in a game

- Allen Iverson (60pts, 4rebs, 6asts) vs. the Orlando Magic on February 12, 2005

- Only player with at least 25 points, 23 assists, 5 steals in a game

- John Stockton (26pts, 24asts, 1reb, 6stls) vs. the Houston Rockets on January 3, 1989

- Only player with at least 30 points, 22 assists, 1 steal in a game

- Kevin Porter (32pts, 5rebs, 4stls) vs. the Chicago Bulls on February 27, 1979

- Only player with at least 35 points, 15 assists, 20 rebounds in a game

- Wilt Chamberlain (24rebs) vs. the Seattle SuperSonics on February 14, 1968

- Only player with 5 three-pointers, 8 two-pointers, 22 free throws made in a game

- James Harden vs. the New York Knicks on January 23, 2019

==== 4 category combination ====
- Only quadruple-doubles (10 or more in four of five stats: points, rebounds, assists, blocks, steals) in a game

- Nate Thurmond (22pts, 14rebs, 13asts, 12blks, 1stl) vs. Atlanta Hawks on October 18, 1974
- Alvin Robertson (20pts, 11rebs, 10asts, 10stls) vs. Phoenix Suns on February 18, 1986
- Hakeem Olajuwon (18pts, 16rebs, 10asts, 11blks, 1stl) vs. Milwaukee Bucks on March 29, 1990
- David Robinson (34pts, 10rebs, 10asts, 10blks, 2stls) vs. Detroit Pistons on February 17, 1994

- Only player with at least 15 points, 15 rebounds, 15 assists without a missed field goal in a game

- Nikola Jokić (21pts, 19rebs) going 10-of-10 from the field vs. the Washington Wizards on February 22, 2024

- Only player with 40 points, 10 rebounds, and five 3-pointers in 30 minutes or less

- LeBron James on December 31, 2021

- Only player with 30 points, 5 assists, 5 rebounds in 23 minutes or less

- LeBron James (8asts) in 22:32 (min/sec) vs. the New Orleans Pelicans on December 7, 2023 (IST semis)

- Only player with at least 15 points, 25 rebounds, 4 assists, 4 steals in a game

- Anthony Davis (27pts, 5asts, 7stls, 3blks) vs. the Minnesota Timberwolves on March 10, 2024

- Only player with at least 30 points, 10 rebounds, 10 assists in 27 minutes or less

- Luka Dončić (35pts, 11asts, 4stls) in 26min vs. the Golden State Warriors on November 20, 2019

- Only player with at least 15 points, 15 assists, 2 steals, 4 blocks in a game

- LeBron James (43pts, 13rebs) vs. the Denver Nuggets on February 18, 2010

- Only player with at least 13 assists, 12 rebounds, 4 steals, 2 blocks in a game

- Draymond Green (2pts, 14asts, 14rebs, 6stls, 4blks) vs. the Oklahoma City Thunder on February 27, 2016

- Only player with at least 8 assists, 22 rebounds, 2 steals, 5 blocks in a game

- Kareem Abdul-Jabbar (20pts, 10asts) vs. the Buffalo Braves on January 6, 1976

- Only player with at least 7 assists, 22 rebounds, 2 steals, 6 blocks in a game

- Kareem Abdul-Jabbar (28pts, 24rebs) vs. the Boston Celtics on December 28, 1975

- Only player with at least 3 assists, 22 rebounds, 2 steals, 8 blocks in a game

- Kareem Abdul-Jabbar (27pts, 6asts, 34rebs) vs. the Detroit Pistons on December 14, 1975

- Only player with at least 25 points, 18 assists, 6 rebounds, 5 steals in a game

- Chris Paul (11rebs, 1blk) vs. the Chicago Bulls on December 1, 2006

- Only player with at least 22 points, 14 assists, 9 rebounds, 7 steals in a game

- Chris Paul (27pts, 15asts, 10rebs, 1blk) vs. the Philadelphia 76ers on January 26, 2009

- Only player with at least 50 points, 15 rebounds, 6 assists, 3 blocks in a game

- Kareem Abdul-Jabbar (11asts, 1stl) vs. the Portland Trail Blazers on January 19, 1975

- Only player with at least 36 points, 18 rebounds, 6 steals, 3 blocks in a game

- Larry Bird (19rebs, 3asts) vs. the Denver Nuggets on December 12, 1982

- Only player with at least 15 rebounds, 11 assists, 6 steals without a turnover in a game

- Larry Bird (14pts) vs. the Utah Jazz on January 1, 1983

- Only player with at least 50 points, 16 rebounds, 6 assists, 2 blocks in a game

- Bob McAdoo (51pts, 20rebs, 4stls) vs. the Houston Rockets on March 18, 1975

- Only player with at least 33 points, 22 rebounds, 2 steals, 8 blocks in a game

- Bob McAdoo (3stls, 9blks, 1ast) vs. the Houston Rockets on November 12, 1975

- Only player with at least 50 points, 25 rebounds, 5 assists, 1 steal in a game

- Chris Webber (51pts, 26rebs, 3stls, 2blks) vs. the Indiana Pacers on January 5, 2001

- Only player with at least 50 points, 16 rebounds, 5 assists, 4 blocks in a game

- Joel Embiid (17rebs, 2stls) vs. the Chicago Bulls on February 19, 2021

- Only player with at least 42 points, 20 rebounds, 5 assists, 4 blocks in a game

- Joe Barry Carroll (43pts, 24rebs, 6asts, 3stls) vs. the New Jersey Nets on February 1, 1987

- Only player with at least 55 points, 15 rebounds, 3 assists, 3 blocks in a game

- Kevin McHale (56pts, 16rebs, 4asts, 1stl) vs. the Pistons on March 3, 1985

- Only player with at least 50 points, 6 assists, 6 rebounds, 5 steals in a game

- Rick Barry (64pts, 10rebs, 9asts) vs. the Portland Trail Blazers on March 26, 1974

- Only player with at least 28 points, 18 assists, 5 rebounds, 5 steals in a game

- Rick Barry (19asts, 1blk) vs. the Chicago Bulls on November 30, 1976

- Only player with at least 50 points, 4 rebounds, 6 steals, 1 block in a game

- Rick Barry (55pts, 5rebs, 5asts, 7stls) vs. the Philadelphia 76ers on January 23, 1975

- Only players to triple-double without missing a field goal or free throw

- Nikola Jokić made all 11 field goals and 3 free throws vs. the Memphis Grizzlies on December 28, 2023
- Nikola Jokić made all 5 field goals and 3 free throws vs. the Los Angeles Lakers on January 9, 2023
- Russell Westbrook made all 6 field goals and 6 free throws vs. the Philadelphia 76ers on March 22, 2017
- Evan Turner made all 5 field goals and 2 free throws vs. the Minnesota Timberwolves on April 1, 2019
- Wes Unseld made all 7 field goals and 2 free throws vs. the Chicago Bulls on March 20, 1970

- Only players with 25 points, 5 assists, 5 rebounds in 22 minutes or less

- Elgin Baylor (13rebs, 7asts) in 19min vs. the San Francisco Warriors on March 20, 1966
- Dolph Schayes (28pts, 19rebs) in 20min vs. the Boston Celtics on February 8, 1961

- Only player with at least 21 points, 11 assists, 21 rebounds, 1 steal in a game

- Domantas Sabonis (22pts, 12asts, 23rebs, 2stls, 1blk) vs. the Orlando Magic on January 3, 2024

- Only player with at least 22 points, 13 assists, 11 rebounds, 7 steals in a game

- Johnny Moore (26pts, 9stls, 1blk) vs. the Golden State Warriors on January 8, 1985

- Only player with at least 51 points, 4 rebounds, 5 steals, 2 blocks in a game

- Pete Maravich (6rebs, 1ast) vs. the Phoenix Suns on March 18, 1977

- Only player with at least 25 points, 18 assists, 4 rebounds, 6 steals in a game

- Norm Nixon (27pts, 19asts, 5rebs) vs. the New York Knicks on November 3, 1978

- Only player with at least 34 points, 18 assists, 3 steals, 1 block in a game

- Kevin Johnson (3rebs) vs. the Los Angeles Clippers on February 9, 1989

- Only player with at least 15 points, 18 assists, 4 rebounds, 7 steals in a game

- Kevin Johnson (21pts, 19asts, 6rebs) vs. the Dallas Mavericks on April 19, 1996

- Only player with at least 29 points, 12 assists, 7 steals, 1 block in a game

- John Wall (36pts, 13asts, 7rebs) vs. the Boston Celtics on January 16, 2016

- Only player with at least 10 assists, 20 rebounds, 3 steals, 5 blocks in a game

- DeMarcus Cousins (24pts, 21rebs, 6blks) vs. the Houston Rockets on April 1, 2015

- Only player with at least 25 points, 20 assists, 2 rebounds, 5 steals in a game

- Phil Ford (26pts, 22asts, 5rebs) vs. the Milwaukee Bucks on February 21, 1979

- Only player with at least 15 points, 20 assists, 3 rebounds, 7 steals in a game

- John Stockton (20pts, 28asts, 8stls) vs. the San Antonio Spurs on January 15, 1991

- Only player with at least 50 points, 10 rebounds, 5 assists, 5 blocks in a game

- Joel Embiid (59pts, 11rebs, 8asts, 7blks, 1stl) vs. the Utah Jazz on November 13, 2022

==== 5 category combination ====
- Only player with at least 35 points, 5 assists, 15 rebounds, 5 steals, 10 blocks in a game

- Hakeem Olajuwon (38pts, 6asts, 17rebs, 7stls, 12blks) vs. the Seattle SuperSonics on March 10, 1987

- Note: almost recorded the first quintuple-double

- Only player to record a 20–20 on a 5x5 (20+ in any 2 stats and at least 5 on the remaining 3 stats)

- Jusuf Nurkic recorded 24 points, 23 rebounds, 7 assists, 5 steals and 5 blocks on January 1, 2019.

- Only 6x5 (at least 6 each of all five stats: points, rebounds, assists, blocks, steals)

- Hakeem Olajuwon (38pts, 6asts, 17rebs, 7stls, 12blks) vs. the Seattle Supersonics on March 10, 1987
- Andrei Kirilenko (14pts, 8rebs, 9asts, 6stls, 7blks) vs. Lakers on January 3, 2006

- Only player with at least 25 points, 10 rebounds, 5 assists, 5 blocks, and 5 threes in a game

- Victor Wembanyama (28pts, 13rebs, 7asts, 2stls) vs. the Oklahoma City Thunder on February 29, 2024

- Only player with at least 50 points, 6 rebounds, 6 assists, 3 blocks, 2 steals in a game

- Luka Dončić (14asts, 4stls) vs. the Phoenix Suns on December 25, 2023

- Only player with at least 20 points, 15 rebounds, 16 assists, 2 blocks, 2 steals in a game

- Luka Dončić (36pts, 18asts) vs. the Oklahoma City Thunder on December 2, 2023

- Only player with at least 38 points, 11 assists, 12 rebounds, 3 steals, 2 blocks in a game

- Nikola Jokić (46pts, 4blks) vs. the New Orleans Pelicans on March 6, 2022

- Only player with at least 29 points, 13 assists, 18 rebounds, 1 steal, 2 blocks in a game

- Russell Westbrook (33pts, 15asts, 19rebs) vs. the Indiana Pacers on May 8, 2021

- Only players with at least 30 points, 10 assists, 10 rebounds, 4 steals, 4 blocks in game

- Michael Jordan on January 16, 1988, and Kevin Durant on December 1, 2013

- Only player with at least 50 points, 6 assists, 5 rebounds, 5 steals, 1 block in a game

- Michael Jordan (9asts) vs. the Boston Celtics on March 18, 1988

- Only player with at least 43 points, 6 assists, 5 rebounds, 5 steals, 4 blocks in a game

- Michael Jordan (7rebs) vs. the Sacramento Kings on February 16, 1987

- Only player with at least 25 points, 10 assists, 10 rebounds, 6 steals, 3 blocks in a game

- Michael Jordan vs. the New Jersey Nets on January 2, 1988

- Only player with at least 44 points, 7 rebounds, 13 assists, 3 steals, 1 block in a game

- Michael Jordan (47pts, 11rebs, 2blks, 4stls) vs. the Indiana Pacers on April 13, 1989

- Only player with at least 37 points, 9 rebounds, 16 assists, 2 steals, 1 block in a game

- LeBron James (39pts, 12rebs, 4stls) vs. the Dallas Mavericks on November 1, 2019

- Only player with at least 50 points, 10 rebounds, 5 assists, 5 steals, 1 block in a game

- Anthony Davis (15rebs, 4blks) vs. the Denver Nuggets on October 26, 2016

- Only player with at least 32 points, 7 assists, 17 rebounds, 4 steals, 2 blocks in a game

- Anthony Davis (33pts, 8asts) vs. the Minnesota Timberwolves on December 30, 2023

- Only player with at least 20 points, 7 assists, 12 rebounds, 6 steals, 3 blocks in a game

- Kareem Abdul-Jabbar (30pts, 8asts, 7stls) vs. the Buffalo Braves on March 14, 1976

- Only player with at least 33 points, 9 assists, 14 rebounds, 3 steals, 2 blocks in a game

- Kareem Abdul-Jabbar (35pts, 12asts, 20rebs) vs. the Golden State Warriors on March 5, 1976
- Kareem Abdul-Jabbar (34pts, 17rebs, 3blks) vs. the Golden State Warriors on April 4, 1976

- Only player with at least 27 points, 16 assists, 6 rebounds, 5 steals, 1 block in a game

- Magic Johnson (33pts, 15rebs, 17asts, 6stls) vs. the Denver Nuggets on March 29, 1981

- Only player with at least 31 points, 17 assists, 6 rebounds, 3 steals, 1 block in a game

- Magic Johnson (33pts, 19asts, 12rebs) vs. the Sacramento Kings on March 22, 1987
- Magic Johnson (33pts, 15rebs, 6stls) vs. the Denver Nuggets on March 29, 1981

- Only player with at least 33 points, 13 assists, 12 rebounds, 3 steals, 2 blocks in a game

- Magic Johnson (36pts, 14asts, 13rebs, 3blks) vs. the Golden State Warriors on April 8, 1983

- Only player with at least 10 points, 12 assists, 11 rebounds, 4 steals, 3 blocks in a game

- Pau Gasol (21pts, 12rebs) vs. the Seattle SuperSonics on March 8, 2006

- Only player with at least 28 points, 10 rebounds, 15 assists, 3 steals, 3 blocks in a game

- Larry Bird (19rebs) vs. the Atlanta Hawks on January 13, 1982

- Only player with at least 49 points, 10 rebounds, 12 assists, 3 steals, 1 block in a game

- Larry Bird (14rebs, 4stls) vs. the Portland Trail Blazers on March 15, 1992

- Only player with at least 30 points, 10 rebounds, 10 assists, 8 steals, 2 blocks in a game

- Larry Bird (12rebs, 9stls) vs. the Utah Jazz on February 18, 1985

- Only player with at least 29 points, 6 assists, 21 rebounds, 4 steals, 2 blocks in a game

- Larry Bird (36pts, 5stls, 3blks) vs. the Los Angeles Lakers on February 11, 1981

- Only player with 25 points, 7 assists, 13 rebounds, 4 steals, 3 blocks in a game

- Chris Webber (31pts, 11asts) vs. the Los Angeles Lakers on March 24, 1995

- Only player with at least 3 points, 10 assists, 12 rebounds, 6 steals, 3 blocks in a game

- Chris Webber (19pts) vs. the Golden State Warriors on December 15, 1996

- Only player with at least 25 points, 20 rebounds, 7 assists, 4 steals, 3 blocks in a game

- Vlade Divac (8asts, 24rebs) vs. the Charlotte Hornets on February 24, 1995

- Only player with at least 38 points, 7 assists, 14 rebounds, 4 steals, 2 blocks in a game

- David Robinson (39pts, 15rebs) vs. the Phoenix Suns on April 16, 1994

- Only player with at least 45 points, 9 rebounds, 6 assists, 5 steals, 1 block in a game

- Amar'e Stoudemire (49pts, 11rebs, 2blks) vs. the Indiana Pacers on November 5, 2008

- Only player with at least 45 points, 7 assists, 7 rebounds, 5 steals, 1 block in a game

- James Harden (11asts, 8rebs) vs. the Portland Trail Blazers on November 18, 2015

- Only player with at least 39 points, 5 assists, 5 rebounds, 6 steals, 3 blocks in a game

- James Harden (41pts, 11asts, 9rebs) vs. the Phoenix Suns on March 15, 2019
- James Harden (43pts, 12rebs, 4blks) vs. the Utah Jazz on February 2, 2019

- Only player with at least 30 points, 9 assists, 13 rebounds, 5 steals, 2 block in a game

- James Harden (10asts) vs. the Los Angeles Clippers on December 30, 2016

- Only player with at least 40 points, 9 rebounds, 14 assists, 3 steals, 1 block in a game

- Bradley Beal (43pts, 10rebs, 15asts, 2blks) vs. the Toronto Raptors on January 13, 2019

- Only player with at least 39 points, 8 rebounds, 6 assists, 5 steals, 4 blocks in a game

- Hakeem Olajuwon (42pts, 13rebs) vs. the Los Angeles Clippers on April 6, 1993

- Only player with at least 25 points, 7 assists, 13 rebounds, 4 steals, 3 blocks in a game

- Hakeem Olajuwon (29pts, 9asts, 18rebs, 5stls, 11blks) vs. the Golden State Warriors on March 3, 1990

- Only player with at least 20 points, 10 assists, 13 rebounds, 5 steals, 3 blocks in a game

- Hakeem Olajuwon (26pts, 4blks) vs. the Golden State Warriors on April 7, 1994

- Only player with at least 37 points, 12 assists, 12 rebounds, 3 steals, 2 blocks in a game

- Hakeem Olajuwon (13rebs) vs. the Golden State Warriors on December 1, 1994

- Only player with at least 30 points, 9 assists, 12 rebounds, 5 steals, 3 blocks in a game

- Hakeem Olajuwon (33pts, 4blks) vs. the Golden State Warriors on February 26, 1992

- Only player with at least 29 points, 5 assists, 22 rebounds, 2 steals, 5 blocks in a game

- Hakeem Olajuwon (34pts, 4stls, 7blks) vs. the Golden State Warriors on April 1, 1986

- Only player with at least 32 points, 7 assists, 13 rebounds, 4 steals, 3 blocks in a game

- Charles Barkley (15rebs, 5stls) vs. the Cleveland Cavaliers on January 23, 1990

- Only player with at least 20 points, 8 assists, 19 rebounds, 5 steals, 1 block in a game

- Charles Barkley (29pts, 9asts, 4blks) vs. the Indiana Pacers on April 11, 1986

- Only player with at least 10 points, 10 assists, 14 rebounds, 5 steals, 2 blocks in a game

- Charles Barkley (29pts, 15rebs) vs. the New Jersey Nets on March 19, 1990

- Only player with at least 15 points, 11 assists, 13 rebounds, 5 steals, 2 blocks in a game

- Jason Kidd (20pts, 12asts) vs. the Dallas Mavericks on March 15, 1998

- Only player with at least 32 points, 7 assists, 10 rebounds, 6 steals, 2 blocks in a game

- Alvin Robertson (34pts, 10asts, 10rebs, 7stls) vs. the Los Angeles Lakers on November 19, 1986

- Only player with at least 34 points, 7 assists, 16 rebounds, 4 steals, 2 blocks in a game

- Alvin Robertson (37pts, 8asts) vs. the Golden State Warriors on January 16, 1990

- Only player with at least 10 points, 11 assists, 10 rebounds, 6 steals, 2 blocks in a game

- Andrei Kirilenko (20pts, 11rebs, 4blks) vs. the Los Angeles Lakers on November 30, 2007

- Only player with at least 34 points, 17 assists, 4 rebounds, 3 steals, 1 block in a game

- Isiah Thomas (47pts, 5rebs, 4stls) vs. the Denver Nuggets on December 13, 1983

- Only player with at least 10 points, 21 rebounds, 3 assists, 6 steals, 2 blocks in a game

- Karl Malone (28pts, 6asts, 3blks) vs. the Phoenix Suns on March 22, 1988

- Only player with at least 10 points, 10 assists, 14 rebounds, 4 steals, 3 blocks in a game

- Dave Cowens (24pts, 16rebs, 4blks) vs. the Denver Nuggets on February 27, 1977

- Only player with at least 37 points, 6 assists, 21 rebounds, 4 steals, 1 block in a game

- DeMarcus Cousins (44pts, 10asts, 23rebs) vs. the Chicago Bulls on January 22, 2018

- Only player with at least 29 points, 3 assists, 23 rebounds, 2 steals, 5 blocks in a game

- Andre Drummond (30pts, 4asts, 24rebs, 3stls, 6blks) vs. the Utah Jazz on January 24, 2018

- Only player with at least 30 points, 7 assists, 13 rebounds, 5 steals, 4 blocks in a game

- Julius Erving vs. the Kansas City Kings on March 14, 1982

- Only player with at least 35 points, 3 assists, 22 rebounds, 2 steals, 5 blocks in a game

- Patrick Ewing (44pts, 4asts, 7blks) vs. the Los Angeles Clippers on January 7, 1990

- Only player with at least 38 points, 9 assists, 13 rebounds, 3 steals, 2 blocks in a game

- Bob Lanier (40pts, 4stls) vs. the Portland Trail Blazers on December 29, 1976

- Only player with at least 21 points, 11 assists, 12 rebounds, 5 steals, 2 blocks in a game

- Ben Simmons (34pts, 12asts) vs. the Brooklyn Nets on January 20, 2020

==== Other ====
- Shortest player to record a triple-double in a game

- Isaiah Thomas (24pts, 11rebs, 10asts) vs. the Washington Wizards on March 18, 2014

- Most personal fouls in a game

- 8 by Don Otten on November 24, 1949
- 8 by Lew Hitch on January 17, 1952

- Fewest dribbles in a 60-point performance

- 11 dribbles by Klay Thompson (touched ball 52 times for 88.4 seconds) vs. the Pacers in 2016

- Only player with 2 wedgies in the same game (since tracking began in 2014)

- Reggie Jackson had consec. wedgies on back-to-back plays vs. Dallas Mavericks on November 23, 2021

- Most points scored in under a minute of a game

- Tracy McGrady scored 13 points in the final 33 seconds on December 9, 2004

- Note: in the post-season, Reggie Miller scored 8 points in the final 9 seconds in 1995

- Only player to officially score for two teams in the same game

- Eric Money for the Nets and 76ers in November 1978 & March 1979

- Highest plus-minus in a game (since tracking began 1996–97)

- +57 by Luc Mbah a Moute on November 22, 2017

- Lowest plus-minus in a game (since tracking began 1996–97)

- –60 by Cody Williams on January 10, 2026

== Race and gender-related records ==
- First non-white and first Asian player to get drafted in the NBA

- Wat Misaka on June 2, 1947, when the Knicks selected him with the 61st overall pick in the seventh round

- First Black player to get drafted in the NBA

- Chuck Cooper on April 25, 1950, when Boston selected him with the 13th overall pick in the second round

- First Black player to sign an NBA contract

- Harold Hunter signed with the Washington Capitols the day after the 1950 Draft

- First Black player to play an NBA game

- Earl Lloyd on October 31, 1950

- First Black player to win NBA MVP

- Bill Russell in his second NBA season when he averaged 16.6 points and 22.7 rebounds per game

- First Black player to win Rookie of the Year

- Ray Felix when he averaged 17.6 points and 13.3 rebounds per game during the 1953-54 season

- First Black starting five

- Willie Naulls, Sam Jones, K.C. Jones, Tom Sanders, Bill Russell on the day after Christmas in 1964

- First Black NBA head coach

- Bill Russell after Boston's 1966 title (player-coach)

- First Black NBA general manager

- Wayne Embry for the Milwaukee Bucks in 1972

- First Black majority NBA governor

- Robert Johnson in 2002 for Charlotte Hornets

- First Black NBA referee to officiate a game

- Jackie White on February 11, 1968 (Chicago Bulls vs. Cincinnati Royals). White wore No. 32 on the back of his uniform.

- First full-time Black NBA referee

- Kenneth Hudson from 1968 to 1972

- First Black female NBA referee

- Violet Palmer in the season opener between the Vancouver Grizzlies and Dallas Mavericks on October 31, 1997

- First female NBA assistant coach

- Lisa Boyer was the assistant for the Cleveland Cavaliers in the 2001–02 season.

- First female full-time assistant coach in any major U.S. professional leagues

- Becky Hammon was the assistant coach for the San Antonio Spurs from 2014–2022

- First female to serve as the head coach in an NBA game

- Becky Hammon while the Spurs were playing the Lakers on December 30, 2020

- First openly gay player in any major U.S. professional leagues

- Jason Collins in April 2013

- First transgender and non-binary referee in U.S. professional sports

- Che Flores announced entering their second season in October 2023.

- First international NBA player

- Hank Biasatti in 1946, who was born in Italy and raised in Canada

- First Japanese-born NBA player

- Yuta Tabuse who played four games with the Phoenix Suns in 2004

- First non-American full-time assistant coach

- Igor Kokoškov from Serbia in 2000

- Highest-paid player in a single season

- Jayson Tatum signed a five-year $314M deal at over $70M per year on July 1, 2024.

- Largest NBA coaching total contract

- Erik Spoelstra agreed to an 8-year $120 million contract extension on January 9, 2024.

- Largest NBA coaching annual contract (excluding Gregg Popovich who is also a team president)

- Steve Kerr with a two-year, $35 million extension on February 23, 2024

- Longest distance field goal made

- 89 feet by Baron Davis vs. Milwaukee Bucks on February 17, 2001

- Longest game-winning buzzer-beater

- 61 feet by Devonte Graham vs. the Oklahoma City Thunder on December 16, 2021

- Shortest player to play a game

- Muggsy Bogues at 5 feet, 3 inches

- Tallest players to play a game

- Manute Bol and Gheorghe Mureșan at 7 feet, 7 inches

- Largest height difference between teammates

- 2 feet, 4 inches between Manute Bol and Muggsy Bogues, 1987–88 season

- Longest tenure as president of the National Basketball Players Association

- Oscar Robertson (1965–1974)

- Longest suspensions by player

- 164 regular season games by O. J. Mayo, 2016–17
- 73 regular season games by Ron Artest, 2004–05

- Most franchises played for

- 13 by Ish Smith (Houston Rockets 2010–11; Memphis Grizzlies 2011; Golden State Warriors 2011–12; Orlando Magic 2012–2013; Milwaukee Bucks 2013; Phoenix Suns 2013–14; Oklahoma City Thunder 2014–15; Philadelphia 76ers 2015, 2015–16; New Orleans Pelicans 2015; Detroit Pistons 2016–2019; Washington Wizards 2019–2021; 2022; Charlotte Hornets 2021–22 & Denver Nuggets 2022)

- Largest trade in terms of number of teams and players included

- Five-team, thirteen-player trade on August 2, 2005. Included the Miami Heat, Memphis Grizzlies, New Orleans Hornets, Boston Celtics and Utah Jazz. Notably sent Antoine Walker and Jason Williams to the Heat

- Quickest pair of five-by-fives

- Andrei Kirilenko had a 5x5 on December 3, 2003, followed by another a week later, on December 10, 2003

- Quickest to reach a five-by-five in a game

- Victor Wembanyama in 30 minutes and 55 seconds vs. the Los Angeles Lakers on February 23, 2024

- Most combined wedgies (basketball stuck between rim & backboard) in a season

- 59 in 2023–24 (since tracking began in 2014)

- Most half-court shots made in a season

- 13 in 2014 season

- Largest number of players to play in a season

- On December 27, 2021, Greg Monroe became the 541st player to play that season.

- Most points in a calendar month

- 984 by Wilt Chamberlain in January, 1962

- Most rebounds in a calendar month

- 311 by Dennis Rodman in January, 1992

- Most assists in a calendar month

- 256 by John Stockton in March, 1988

- Most steals in a calendar month

- 72 by Alvin Robertson in November, 1990

- Most blocks in a calendar month

- 109 by Manute Bol in January, 1986

- Highest single-month plus-minus

- +272 by Scottie Pippen in November 1996

- Highest plus-minus in first 4 games with new team

- +91 by Quentin Richardson

- Highest plus-minus in first 10 games with new team

- +170 by OG Anunoby

- Only player to record 250 points, 50 rebounds, and 50 assists in a five-game span

- Luka Dončić on December 31, 2022

- Most consecutive games with at least 20 points, 5 rebounds, 5 assists (since the NBA/ABA merger in 1976)

- 20 by Luka Dončić between November 1, 2019, and December 12, 2019

- Note: Oscar Robertson had 29 straight in 1964-65 and 25 straight in 1963–64.

- Only player with 170 points, 100 rebounds, 80 assists in team's first 10 games of the season

- Ben Simmons on November 7, 2017 (avg 17.8 ppg, 10.1 rpg, 8 apg)

- Only player with five straight 30-pt games after having less than five 30-pt games in total (min. 100 games) entering the streak

- Gary Trent Jr. on February 1, 2022

- Most points by an undrafted duo in a game

- 70 by Duncan Robinson and Kendrick Nunn on December 11, 2019

- Most 3-point makes by a pair of teammates in a game

- 19 combined by Payton Pritchard (10) and Derrick White (9) on March 5, 2025

- Only teammates to score 50-plus points in consecutive games

- Kyrie Irving and Kevin Durant on March 15, 2022

- Only teammates to triple-double in same game more than once

- Jimmy Butler and Bam Adebayo of the Miami Heat on February 19, 2021, and on December 10, 2019

- Only father-son duo to play together in the same game

- LeBron James and Bronny James with the Los Angeles Lakers on October 22, 2024

- Only three brothers to play in the same game

- Jrue Holiday (New Orleans Pelicans) vs. Justin Holiday and Aaron Holiday of the Indiana Pacers on December 28, 2019
- Kostas Antetokounmpo, Thanasis Antetokounmpo, and Giannis Antetokounmpo on March 31, 2021

- Most points by a pair of brothers in a game

- 78 by Dominique Wilkins (52) with the Hawks and Gerald Wilkins (26) with the Knicks on December 7, 1991

- Most combined points among father-son duos, career

- 43,624 by LeBron James (43,440) and Bronny James (184)

- Largest comeback by any player in first game vs. former team

- Damian Lillard with a 26 point comeback vs. the Portland Trail Blazers on November 26, 2023

- Most points by player in return game after missing at least 25 straight games

- 34 by Ja Morant vs. the New Orleans Pelicans on December 19, 2023

== See also ==
- List of NBA regular season team records
- List of NBA postseason records
- List of NBA All-Star Game records
- List of WNBA regular season records
- Basketball statistics
- List of NFL individual records
- List of NFL team records
- List of NHL records (individual)
- List of NHL records (team)
- List of NBA career scoring leaders
- List of NBA career 3-point scoring leaders
- List of NBA career rebounding leaders
- List of NBA career assists leaders
- List of NBA career steals leaders
- List of NBA career blocks leaders
- List of NBA seasons played leaders
- List of NBA career playoff games played leaders
- List of NBA career playoff turnovers leaders
- List of NBA career playoff 3-point scoring leaders
- List of NBA career playoff triple-double leaders
- List of NBA career playoff steals leaders
- List of NBA career playoff rebounding leaders
- List of NBA annual statistical leaders
- List of NBA annual minutes played leaders
- List of NBA rookie single-season scoring leaders
- List of NBA single-season scoring leaders
- List of NBA single-season rebounding leaders
- List of NBA single-game scoring leaders
- List of NBA single-game rebounding leaders
- List of NBA single-game assists leaders
- List of NBA single-game steals leaders
- List of NBA single-game blocks leaders
- List of NBA longest winning streaks
- List of NBA longest losing streaks
- List of NBA teams by single season win percentage
- List of oldest and youngest National Basketball Association players
- List of tallest players in NBA history
- List of shortest players in NBA history
- List of NBA rivalries
- List of second-generation NBA players
- List of undrafted NBA players
- Timeline of the NBA
- List of NBA arenas
- List of NBA awards
- List of NBA seasons
- List of NBA retired numbers
- List of NBA head coaches with 400 games coached
- List of current NBA head coaches
- List of NBA referees
- List of NBA general managers
- List of NBA team presidents
- List of NBA team owners
- List of NBA mascots
- NBA Cheerleading
- NBA Summer League
- NBA G League
- NBA salary cap
- NBA playoff series
- NBA franchise post-season droughts
- NBA franchise post-season streaks
- NBA champions
- Superteams in the NBA
