= New Orleans Pelicans accomplishments and records =

This page details the all-time statistics, records, and other achievements pertaining to the New Orleans Pelicans.

== Franchise records ==
(As of the end of the 2025–26 season)

Bold denotes still active with team.

Italic denotes still active, but not with team.

=== Games played ===
Most games played
Player	Games
David West	530
Anthony Davis	466
Chris Paul	425
Jrue Holiday	415
**Trey Murphy III**	317
P.J. Brown	315
Brandon Ingram	305
**Herbert Jones**	296
Rasual Butler	293
**Zion Williamson**	276

=== Points ===
Most points
Player	Points
Anthony Davis	11,059
David West	8,690
Chris Paul	7,936
Jrue Holiday	7,321
Brandon Ingram	7,017
**Zion Williamson**	6,581
**Trey Murphy III**	4,868
CJ McCollum	4,704
Ryan Anderson	3,702
Jonas Valančiūnas	3,431

=== Rebounds ===
Most rebounds
Player	Rebounds
Anthony Davis	4,906
David West	3,853
P.J. Brown	2,675
Jonas Valančiūnas	2,368
Tyson Chandler	2,225
Chris Paul	1,951
Jamaal Magloire	1,776
**Zion Williamson**	1,768
Emeka Okafor	1,759
Jrue Holiday	1,728

=== Assists ===
Most assists
Player	Assists
Chris Paul	4,228
Jrue Holiday	2,833
Brandon Ingram	1,580
Tyreke Evans	1,139
**Zion Williamson**	1,119
CJ McCollum	1,113
Greivis Vasquez	1,063
David West	1,042
Anthony Davis	982
Baron Davis	950

=== Steals ===
Most steals
Player	Steals
Chris Paul	1,010
Anthony Davis	639
Jrue Holiday	638
**Herbert Jones**	463
David West	396
**Trey Murphy III**	318
Jose Alvarado	308
Baron Davis	280
**Zion Williamson**	279
P.J. Brown	265

=== Blocks ===
Most blocks
Player	Blocks
Anthony Davis	1,121
David West	435
Emeka Okafor	305
Tyson Chandler	269
Jrue Holiday	267
P.J. Brown	253
Jamaal Magloire	235
**Herbert Jones**	200
**Yves Missi**	199
Rasual Butler	181

=== Field goals ===
Most field goals made
Player	Field goals
Anthony Davis	4,153
David West	3,476
Jrue Holiday	2,876
Chris Paul	2,793
Brandon Ingram	2,532
**Zion Williamson**	2,525
CJ McCollum	1,761
**Trey Murphy III**	1,646
Jonas Valančiūnas	1,358
Ryan Anderson	1,315

=== 3-Pt Field goals ===
Most 3-Pt field goals made
Player	3-Pt's Made
**Trey Murphy III**	814
CJ McCollum	692
Jrue Holiday	628
Brandon Ingram	560
Peja Stojaković	553
Ryan Anderson	533
Eric Gordon	421
Rasual Butler	410
Chris Paul	379
Jose Alvarado	374

=== Free Throws ===
Most free throws made
Player	Free Throws
Anthony Davis	2,572
Chris Paul	1,971
David West	1,704
Brandon Ingram	1,393
**Zion Williamson**	1,498
Jrue Holiday	941
**Trey Murphy III**	762
P.J. Brown	701
Jamaal Magloire	658
Eric Gordon	629

== Individual awards ==
Rookie of the Year

- Chris Paul – 2006

Most Improved Player

- Brandon Ingram – 2020

Coach of the Year

- Byron Scott – 2008

NBA Sportsmanship Award

- P. J. Brown – 2004

Twyman–Stokes Teammate of the Year

- DeAndre Jordan – 2026

All-NBA First Team

- Chris Paul – 2008
- Anthony Davis – 2015, 2017, 2018

All-NBA Second Team

- Chris Paul – 2009

All-NBA Third Team

- Jamal Mashburn – 2003
- Baron Davis – 2004
- Chris Paul – 2011

NBA All-Defensive First Team

- Chris Paul – 2009
- Anthony Davis – 2018
- Jrue Holiday – 2018
- Herbert Jones – 2024

NBA All-Defensive Second Team

- Chris Paul – 2008, 2011
- Anthony Davis – 2015, 2017
- Jrue Holiday – 2019

NBA All-Rookie First Team

- Chris Paul – 2006
- Darren Collison – 2010
- Anthony Davis – 2013
- Zion Williamson – 2020

NBA All-Rookie Second Team

- Marcus Thornton – 2010
- Herbert Jones – 2022
- Yves Missi – 2025
- Jeremiah Fears – 2026
- Derik Queen – 2026

=== NBA All-Star Weekend ===
NBA All-Star Selections

- Jamal Mashburn – 2003
- Baron Davis – 2004
- Jamaal Magloire – 2004
- David West – 2008–2009
- Chris Paul – 2008–2011
- Anthony Davis – 2014–2019
- DeMarcus Cousins – 2018
- Brandon Ingram – 2020
- Zion Williamson – 2021, 2023

NBA All-Star Game Most Valuable Player

- Anthony Davis – 2017

All-Star West Head Coach

- Byron Scott – 2008

== Franchise record for championships ==
Championships
	Championships	Seasons
NBA Championships	0	
Conference Championships	0	
Division Championships	1	2008

== See also ==
- NBA records
