= Memphis Grizzlies accomplishments and records =

This page details the all-time statistics, records, and other achievements pertaining to the Memphis Grizzlies.

== Individual records ==
=== Franchise leaders ===
Bold denotes still active with team.

Italic denotes still active but not with team.

Points scored (regular season)

(as of the end of the 2025–26 season)

1. Mike Conley (11,733)
2. Marc Gasol (11,684)
3. Zach Randolph (9,261)
4. Pau Gasol (8,966)
5. Rudy Gay (8,562)
6. Jaren Jackson Jr. (8,382)
7. Shareef Abdur-Rahim (7,801)
8. **Ja Morant** (7,331)
9. Mike Miller (5,982)
10. Desmond Bane (5,580)
11. Dillon Brooks (5,002)
12. Bryant Reeves (4,945)
13. O. J. Mayo (4,584)
14. Shane Battier (4,275)
15. Tony Allen (4,128)
16. Stromile Swift (3,829)
17. Jason Williams (3,400)
18. Mike Bibby (3,153)
19. Lorenzen Wright (3,148)
20. **Brandon Clarke** (3,144)

==== Other statistics (regular season) ====
(as of the end of the 2025–26 season)

Most minutes played
Player	Minutes
Marc Gasol	25,917
Mike Conley	25,700
Zach Randolph	17,928
Rudy Gay	17,338
Pau Gasol	16,904
Shareef Abdur-Rahim	14,237
Mike Miller	13,597
Shane Battier	13,339
Jaren Jackson Jr.	13,021
Bryant Reeves	12,071

Most rebounds
Player	Rebounds
Marc Gasol	5,942
Zach Randolph	5,612
Pau Gasol	4,096
Shareef Abdur-Rahim	3,070
Rudy Gay	2,758
Bryant Reeves	2,745
Jaren Jackson Jr.	2,517
Lorenzen Wright	2,386
Mike Conley	2,327
Stromile Swift	2,128

Most assists
Player	Assists
Mike Conley	4,509
Marc Gasol	2,639
**Ja Morant**	2,428
Jason Williams	2,069
Mike Bibby	1,675
Pau Gasol	1,473
Mike Miller	1,351
Tyus Jones	1,285
Desmond Bane	1,179
Zach Randolph	1,085

Most steals
Player	Steals
Mike Conley	1,161
Tony Allen	796
Marc Gasol	708
Rudy Gay	640
Shane Battier	523
Jaren Jackson Jr.	461
Zach Randolph	429
Shareef Abdur-Rahim	416
Jason Williams	372
**Ja Morant**	335

Most blocks
Player	Blocks
Marc Gasol	1,135
Pau Gasol	877
Jaren Jackson Jr.	845
Stromile Swift	607
Shane Battier	428
Rudy Gay	420
Shareef Abdur-Rahim	374
Bryant Reeves	302
Lorenzen Wright	250
**Brandon Clarke**	246

Most three-pointers made
Player	3-pointers made
Mike Conley	1,086
Mike Miller	844
Desmond Bane	812
Jaren Jackson Jr.	783
Dillon Brooks	573
Jason Williams	500
Rudy Gay	488
O. J. Mayo	477
**Ja Morant**	435
Shane Battier	403

== Individual awards ==
NBA Rookie of the Year

- Pau Gasol - 2002
- Ja Morant - 2020

NBA Coach of the Year

- Hubie Brown – 2004

NBA Executive of the Year

- Jerry West – 2004
- Zach Kleiman – 2022

NBA Sixth Man of the Year

- Mike Miller – 2006

NBA Defensive Player of the Year

- Marc Gasol – 2013
- Jaren Jackson Jr. – 2023

NBA Most Improved Player

- Ja Morant - 2022

NBA Sportsmanship Award

- Mike Conley – 2014, 2016, 2019

Twyman–Stokes Teammate of the Year

- Vince Carter – 2016
- Mike Conley – 2019

All-NBA First Team

- Marc Gasol – 2015

All-NBA Second Team

- Marc Gasol – 2013
- Ja Morant – 2022

All-NBA Third Team

- Zach Randolph – 2011

NBA All-Defensive First Team

- Tony Allen – 2012, 2013, 2015
- Jaren Jackson Jr. – 2022, 2023

NBA All-Defensive Second Team

- Tony Allen – 2011, 2016, 2017
- Marc Gasol – 2013
- Mike Conley – 2013
- Dillon Brooks – 2023
- Jaren Jackson Jr. – 2025

NBA All-Rookie First Team

- Shareef Abdur-Rahim – 1997
- Mike Bibby – 1999
- Pau Gasol – 2002
- Shane Battier – 2002
- Drew Gooden – 2003
- Rudy Gay – 2007
- O. J. Mayo – 2009
- Jaren Jackson Jr. – 2019
- Brandon Clarke – 2020
- Ja Morant – 2020
- Zach Edey – 2025
- Jaylen Wells – 2025
- Cedric Coward – 2026

NBA All-Rookie Second Team

- Bryant Reeves – 1996
- Gordan Giriček – 2003
- Juan Carlos Navarro – 2008
- Marc Gasol – 2009
- Desmond Bane – 2021
- GG Jackson – 2024

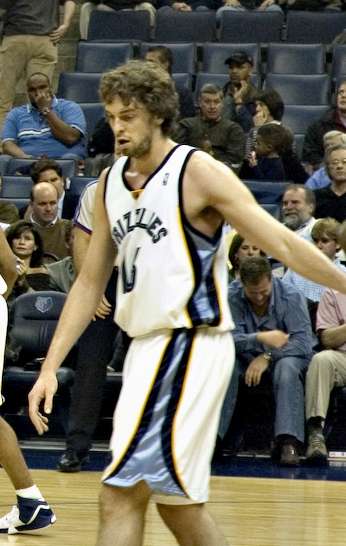
Pau Gasol as a member of the Grizzlies.

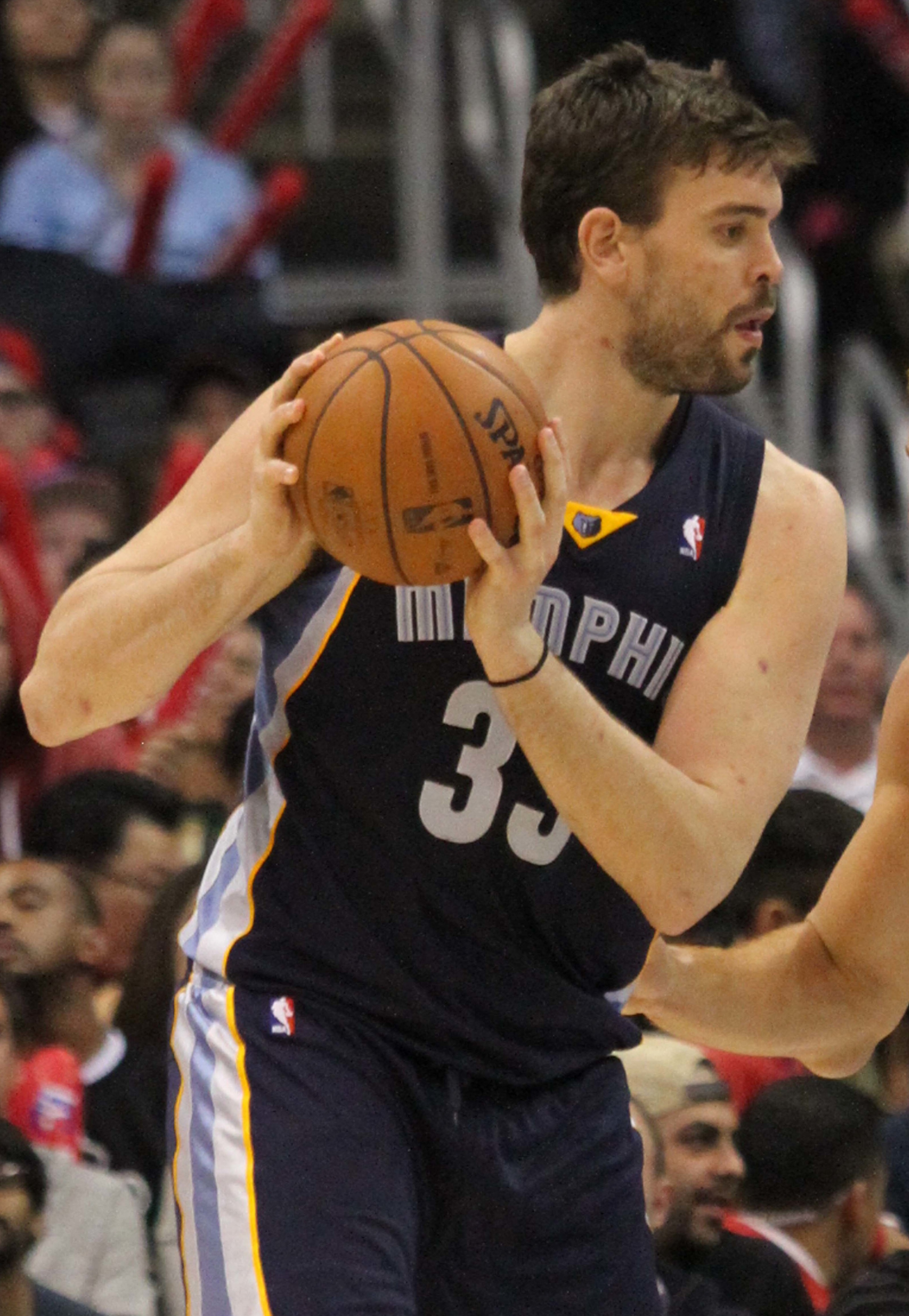
Marc Gasol in 2013

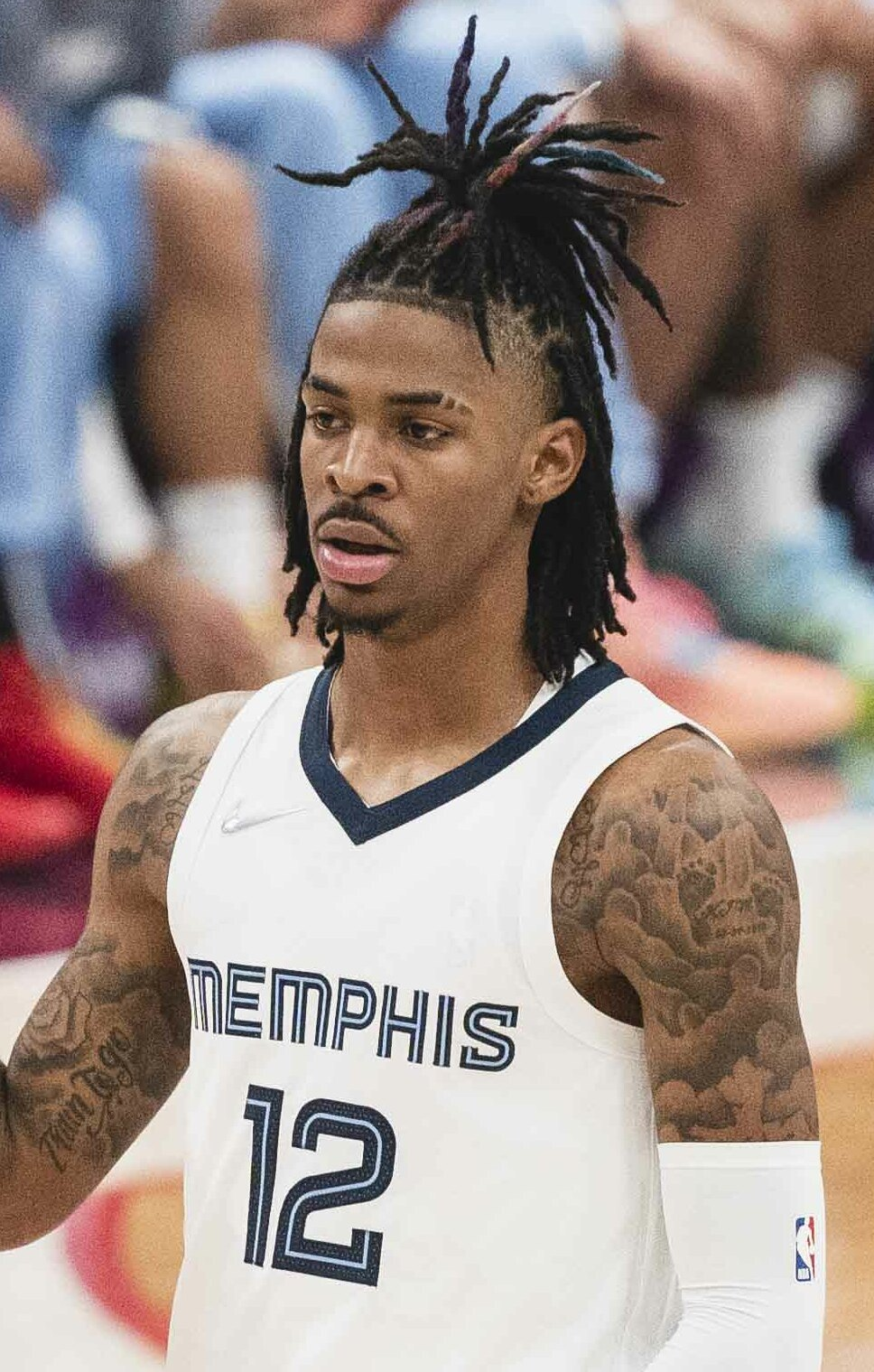
Ja Morant in 2021

=== NBA All-Star Weekend ===
NBA All-Star Selections

- Pau Gasol – 2006
- Zach Randolph – 2010, 2013
- Marc Gasol – 2012, 2015*, 2017
- Ja Morant – 2022*, 2023*
- Jaren Jackson Jr. – 2023, 2025

*All-Star Game Starter

Three-Point Contest

Contestants

- Sam Mack – 1998
- Mike Bibby – 2000
- Wesley Person – 2003
- Mike Miller – 2007
- Desmond Bane – 2022

Slam Dunk Contest

Contestants

- Stromile Swift – 2001

Skills Challenge

Contestants

- Mike Conley Jr. – 2019

Rising Stars Challenge (formerly the Rookie Challenge)

- Bryant Reeves – 1996
- Roy Rogers – 1997
- Shareef Abdur-Rahim – 1997
- Antonio Daniels – 1998
- Michael Dickerson – 1999
- Mike Bibby – 1999
- Pau Gasol – 2002, 2003
- Shane Battier – 2002
- Drew Gooden – 2003
- Rudy Gay – 2007, 2008
- Mike Conley Jr. – 2008
- Juan Carlos Navarro – 2008
- O.J. Mayo – 2009, 2010
- Marc Gasol – 2009, 2010
- Dillon Brooks – 2018
- Jaren Jackson Jr. – 2019, 2020
- Ja Morant – 2020, 2021
- Brandon Clarke – 2020, 2021
- Desmond Bane – 2022
- Kenneth Lofton Jr. – 2023 (G-League)
- Vince Williams Jr. – 2024
- Zach Edey – 2025
- Jaylen Wells – 2025

=== Western Conference Monthly & Weekly Awards ===
Player of the Month

- Zach Randolph – Jan 2011

Defensive Player of the Month

- Jaren Jackson Jr. – Dec 2024

Coach of the Month

- Hubie Brown - Feb 2004, Mar 2004
- Mike Fratello - Jan 2005, Apr 2006
- Lionel Hollins - Dec 2009, Nov 2012, Feb 2013
- Taylor Jenkins - Jan 2020, Dec 2021, Mar 2023

Rookie of the Month

- Shareef Abdur-Rahim - Dec 1996, Feb 1997 (league-wide award)
- Pau Gasol - Nov 2001, Jan 2002, Mar 2002
- Shane Battier - Dec 2001
- Drew Gooden - Nov 2002
- Rudy Gay - Nov 2006
- Tarence Kinsey - Apr 2006
- O.J. Mayo - Nov 2008, Apr 2009
- Nick Calathes - Feb 2014
- Ja Morant - Oct/Nov 2019, Dec 2019, Jan 2020
- Jaylen Wells - Oct/Nov 2024

Player of the Week

- Pau Gasol – 3 total – 2004–05 (1), 2006–07 (2)
- Zach Randolph – 4 total – 2010–11 (3), 2014–15 (1)
- Marc Gasol – 2 total – 2011–12 (1), 2016–17 (1)
- Mike Conley – 1 total – 2018–19 (1)
- Ja Morant – 3 total – 2021–22 (2), 2023–24 (1)
- Jaren Jackson, Jr. – 2 total – 2024–25 (1), 2025–26 (1)
- Ty Jerome – 1 total – 2026–27 (1)

== See also ==
- NBA records
