= Minnesota Timberwolves accomplishments and records =

Legacy listing of the Minnesota Timberwolves

This page details the all-time statistics, records, and other achievements pertaining to the Minnesota Timberwolves.

== Franchise leaders ==
(As of the end of the 2025–26 season)

Bold denotes still active with team.

Italic denotes still active, but not with team.

=== Games played ===
Most Games Played
Player	Games
Kevin Garnett	970
Sam Mitchell	757
Doug West	609
Karl-Anthony Towns	573
Gorgui Dieng	498
Naz Reid	483
Andrew Wiggins	442
**Anthony Edwards**	442
**Jaden McDaniels**	439
Wally Szczerbiak	438

=== Points ===
Most Points Scored
Player	Points
Kevin Garnett	19,201
Karl-Anthony Towns	13,121
**Anthony Edwards**	10,854
Andrew Wiggins	8,710
Sam Mitchell	7,161
Kevin Love	6,989
Wally Szczerbiak	6,777
Doug West	6,216
Naz Reid	5,745
Tony Campbell	4,888

=== Minutes Played ===
Most Minutes Played
Player	Minutes
Kevin Garnett	36,189
Karl-Anthony Towns	19,455
Sam Mitchell	18,394
Andrew Wiggins	15,839
Doug West	15,603
**Anthony Edwards**	15,400
Wally Szczerbiak	14,715
Ricky Rubio	12,989
**Jaden McDaniels**	12,765
Kevin Love	11,933

=== Rebounds ===
Most Rebounds
Player	Rebounds
Kevin Garnett	10,718
Karl-Anthony Towns	6,216
Kevin Love	4,453
**Rudy Gobert**	3,452
Gorgui Dieng	3,068
Sam Mitchell	3,030
Naz Reid	2,440
**Anthony Edwards**	2,319
Christian Laettner	2,225
Al Jefferson	2,162

=== Assists ===
Most Assists
Player	Assists
Kevin Garnett	4,216
Ricky Rubio	3,424
Pooh Richardson	1,973
**Anthony Edwards**	1,826
Karl-Anthony Towns	1,815
Terrell Brandon	1,681
Stephon Marbury	1,393
Micheal Williams	1,239
Doug West	1,216
Wally Szczerbiak	1,190

=== Steals ===
Most Steals
Player	Steals
Kevin Garnett	1,315
Ricky Rubio	845
**Anthony Edwards**	587
Corey Brewer	502
Karl-Anthony Towns	452
Sam Mitchell	449
Andrew Wiggins	436
Doug West	428
**Jaden McDaniels**	415
Gorgui Dieng	413

=== Blocks ===
Most Blocks
Player	Blocks
Kevin Garnett	1,590
Karl-Anthony Towns	721
Gorgui Dieng	489
**Rudy Gobert**	485
Naz Reid	445
Rasho Nesterovic	373
**Jaden McDaniels**	306
Al Jefferson	300
Christian Laettner	299
**Anthony Edwards**	282

=== Field goals ===
Most Field Goals Made
Player	Field Goals
Kevin Garnett	7,647
Karl-Anthony Towns	4,821
**Anthony Edwards**	3,802
Andrew Wiggins	3,218
Sam Mitchell	2,664
Wally Szczerbiak	2,634
Doug West	2,530
Kevin Love	2,318
Naz Reid	2,176
**Jaden McDaniels**	1,911

=== 3–Pt Field goals ===
Most Three-Pointers made
Player	3-pointers made
**Anthony Edwards**	1,314
Karl-Anthony Towns	975
Naz Reid	731
**Jaden McDaniels**	548
Andrew Wiggins	520
D'Angelo Russell	482
Anthony Peeler	465
Kevin Love	440
Mike Conley Jr.	420
**Donte DiVincenzo**	418

=== Free throws ===
Most Free Throws Made
Player	Free Throws
Kevin Garnett	3,743
Karl-Anthony Towns	2,504
**Anthony Edwards**	1,936
Kevin Love	1,913
Sam Mitchell	1,773
Andrew Wiggins	1,754
Christian Laettner	1,463
Ricky Rubio	1,271
Wally Szczerbiak	1,166
Doug West	1,119

== Retired numbers ==
Kevin Garnett, PF (1995–2007); retired February 28, 2027 (upcoming)

== Individual awards ==
NBA MVP

- Kevin Garnett – 2004

NBA Rookie of the Year

- Andrew Wiggins – 2015
- Karl-Anthony Towns – 2016

NBA Defensive Player of the Year

- Rudy Gobert – 2024

NBA Most Improved Player

- Kevin Love – 2011

NBA Sixth Man of the Year

- Naz Reid – 2024

J. Walter Kennedy Citizenship Award

- Kevin Garnett – 2006

NBA Sportsmanship Award

- Mike Conley – 2023

Twyman–Stokes Teammate of the Year Award

- Jamal Crawford – 2018
- Mike Conley – 2024

Kareem Abdul-Jabbar Social Justice Champion Award

- Karl-Anthony Towns – 2024

All-NBA First Team

- Kevin Garnett – 2000, 2003, 2004

All-NBA Second Team

- Kevin Garnett – 2001, 2002, 2005
- Sam Cassell – 2004
- Kevin Love – 2012, 2014
- Anthony Edwards – 2024, 2025

All-NBA Third Team

- Kevin Garnett – 1999, 2007
- Karl-Anthony Towns – 2018, 2022
- Jimmy Butler – 2018

NBA All-Defensive First Team

- Kevin Garnett – 2000–2005
- Rudy Gobert – 2024, 2026

NBA All-Defensive Second Team

- Kevin Garnett – 2006, 2007
- Jimmy Butler – 2018
- Jaden McDaniels – 2024
- Rudy Gobert – 2025

NBA All-Rookie First Team

- Pooh Richardson – 1990
- Christian Laettner – 1993
- Isaiah Rider – 1994
- Stephon Marbury – 1997
- Wally Szczerbiak – 2000
- Randy Foye – 2007
- Ricky Rubio – 2012
- Andrew Wiggins - 2015
- Karl-Anthony Towns – 2016
- Anthony Edwards – 2021

NBA All-Rookie Second Team

- Felton Spencer – 1991
- Kevin Garnett – 1996
- Craig Smith – 2007
- Kevin Love – 2009
- Jonny Flynn – 2010
- Wesley Johnson – 2011
- Derrick Williams – 2012
- Gorgui Dieng – 2014
- Zach LaVine - 2015

=== NBA All-Star Weekend ===
NBA All-Star Game Selections

- Kevin Garnett – 1997, 1998, 2000, 2001, 2002, 2003, 2004, 2005, 2006, 2007
- Tom Gugliotta – 1997
- Wally Szczerbiak – 2002
- Sam Cassell – 2004
- Kevin Love – 2011, 2012, 2014
- Jimmy Butler – 2018
- Karl-Anthony Towns – 2018, 2019, 2022, 2024
- Anthony Edwards – 2023, 2024, 2025, 2026

NBA All-Star Game head coach

- Flip Saunders – 2004
- Chris Finch – 2024

NBA All-Star Game MVP

- Kevin Garnett – 2003
- Anthony Edwards – 2026

NBA Rising Stars Challenge MVP

- Wally Szczerbiak – 2001
- Andrew Wiggins – 2015
- Zach LaVine – 2016

NBA Slam Dunk Contest

- Isaiah Rider - 1994
- Zach LaVine - 2015, 2016

NBA Three-Point Shootout

- Kevin Love - 2012
- Karl-Anthony Towns - 2022

NBA Skills Challenge

- Karl-Anthony Towns - 2016

== Franchise record for championships ==
Championships
Championships	Seasons
NBA Championships
0	0
Conference Championships
0	0
Division Championships
1	2004

== See also ==
- NBA records
