= Kenny Gattison =

American basketball player and coach (born 1964)

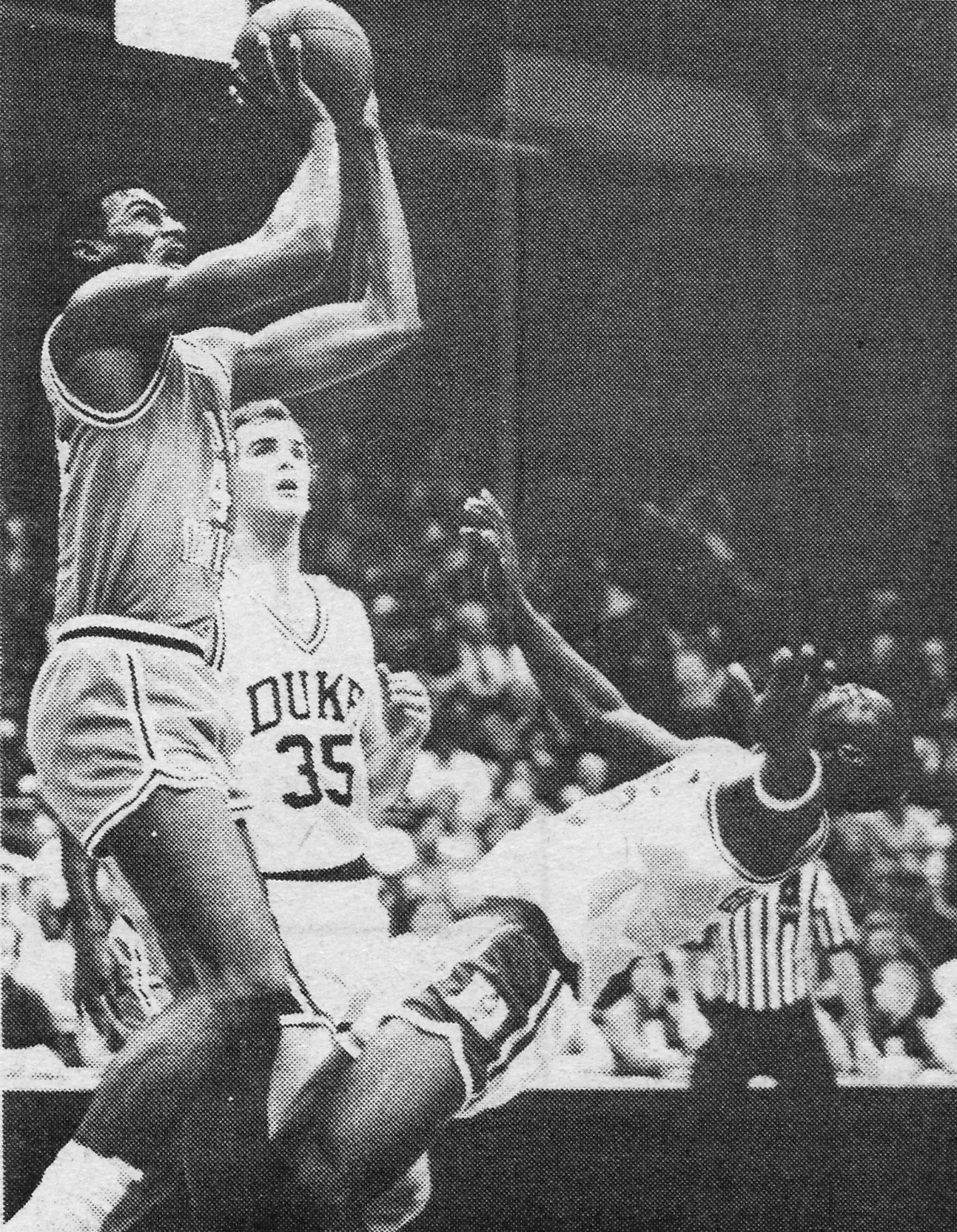
- Gattison shoots in the 1986 NCAA tournament

Personal information
- Born: May 23, 1964 (age 62) Wilmington, North Carolina, U.S.
- Listed height: 6 ft 8 in (2.03 m)
- Listed weight: 225 lb (102 kg)

Career information
- High school: New Hanover (Wilmington, North Carolina)
- College: Old Dominion (1982–1986)
- NBA draft: 1986: 3rd round, 55th overall pick
- Drafted by: Phoenix Suns
- Playing career: 1986–1996
- Position: Power forward / center
- Number: 44, 33
- Coaching career: 1996–present

Career history

Playing
- 1986–1989: Phoenix Suns
- 1989: Fulgor Libertas Forlì
- 1989: Quad City Thunder
- 1989–1995: Charlotte Hornets
- 1995–1996: Vancouver Grizzlies

Coaching
- 1996–1998: New Jersey Nets (assistant)
- 2001–2003: Old Dominion (assistant)
- 2003–2009: New Orleans Hornets (assistant)
- 2010–2013: Atlanta Hawks (assistant)
- 2013–2015: Phoenix Suns (assistant)

Career highlights
- Sun Belt Player of the Year (1986); 2× First-team All-Sun Belt (1985, 1986); No. 44 retired by Old Dominion Monarchs

Career NBA statistics
- Points: 3,923 (7.9 ppg)
- Rebounds: 2,327 (4.7 rpg)
- Assists: 444 (0.7 apg)
- Stats at NBA.com
- Stats at Basketball Reference
Medals
Men's basketball
Representing United States
FIBA U19 World Championship
Gold medal – first place	1983 Palma de Mallorca	National team

Kenneth Clay Gattison (born May 23, 1964) is an American former professional basketball player and National Basketball Association (NBA) assistant coach.

== High school and college ==
Born in Wilmington, North Carolina, Gattison grew up playing basketball at the park with Michael Jordan. He attended New Hanover High School, where he competed against Jordan, and defeated his team in the high school state championship. Gattison went to college at Old Dominion University, where he was a two-time honorable mention All-American. He is the Sun Belt Conference's all-time rebound leader with 963 recoveries, and ranks fourth all-time at ODU. His 1,623 career points ranks him 11th all-time in ODU history.

Kenny performed 34 double-doubles and had 87 double figure games. Gattison competed in the 1983 National Sports Festival in Colorado Springs for the East Squad. He also was selected to the U.S. Junior World Cup team in 1983. Gattison averaged 16.1 points per game for ODU in 1985 and 17.4 points per game in 1986. He helped lead ODU to two straight NCAA tournament bids and in his senior year of 1986, the eighth seeded Monarchs defeated West Virginia for ODU's first ever NCAA Division I Tournament win. That same year, Gattison shot .637 (218–342) from the field.

Gattison was named honorable mention All-American by the Associated Press in 1985 and 1986. He was named the Sun Belt Conference Player of the Year in 1986, and was later named to the Sun Belt Conference's All-Decade team. The ODU Alumni Association named Gattison as the 1986 Male Athlete of the Year. Gattison graduated from Old Dominion with a degree in distributive education, specializing in personnel management. In April 1991, Gattison was inducted into the ODU Sports Hall of Fame. In 1992 his #44 jersey at ODU was retired. In 2004 New Hanover High School named the basketball court in his name and on Feb. 8, 2013 Gattison was inducted into the Greater Wilmington Area Sports Hall of Fame.

== Professional career ==
Gattison was selected by the Phoenix Suns in the 3rd round (55th overall) of the 1986 NBA draft. A 6'8" forward-center, he in nine NBA seasons for 3 different teams. He played for the Phoenix Suns (1986–87, 1988), Charlotte Hornets (1989–95) and Vancouver Grizzlies (1995–96). On February 22, 1996, he was traded by the Grizzlies to the Orlando Magic, and on August 9, 1996, the Magic traded him to the Utah Jazz, but did not play a game for either team.

In his NBA career, Gattison played in 494 games and scored a total of 3,923 points. His best season as a professional came during the 1991–92 NBA season as a member of the Hornets, appearing in 82 games (71 starts) and averaging 12.7 points and 7.1 rebounds per game. Gattison's 52.9% career field goal percentage with the Charlotte Hornets is the best in the franchise history.

== Coaching career ==
After retiring, Gattison served as an assistant coach on John Calipari's staff with the New Jersey Nets from 1996 to 1998. He then returned to his alma mater, Old Dominion in 2001 as an assistant coach until 2003 when he was named assistant coach with his former team, the New Orleans (former Charlotte) Hornets. He remained with New Orleans until June 2009.

On July 28, 2010, Gattison was named an assistant coach to the Atlanta Hawks under head coach Larry Drew.

On June 25, 2013, Gattison was named an assistant coach to the Phoenix Suns under former teammate and current head coach Jeff Hornacek.

On May 29, 2015, Gattison's two-year tenure on the Suns staff ended as he was informed that his contract, set to expire June 30, would not be renewed.

On September 28, 2016, Gattison was named Vice President of membership and Player Programming for the National Basketball Retired Players Association (NBRPA), the official alumni organization for former players from the NBA, ABA, WNBA and Harlem Globetrotters.

== Career statistics ==
Legend
GP	Games played	GS	Games started	MPG	Minutes per game
FG%	Field goal percentage	3P%	3-point field goal percentage	FT%	Free throw percentage
RPG	Rebounds per game	APG	Assists per game	SPG	Steals per game
BPG	Blocks per game	PPG	Points per game	**Bold**	Career high

=== NBA ===
==== Regular season ====
Year	Team	GP	GS	MPG	FG%	3P%	FT%	RPG	APG	SPG	BPG	PPG
1986–87	Phoenix	77	14	14.3	.476	.000	.632	3.5	.5	.3	.4	5.2
1988–89	Phoenix	2	0	4.5	.000	–	.500	.5	.0	.0	.0	.5
1989–90	Charlotte	63	2	14.9	**.550**	**1.000**	.682	3.1	.6	.6	.5	5.9
1990–91	Charlotte	72	6	21.6	.532	.000	.661	5.3	.6	.7	**.9**	9.0
1991–92	Charlotte	**82**	**71**	**27.1**	.529	.000	**.688**	**7.1**	**1.6**	.7	.8	**12.7**
1992–93	Charlotte	75	5	19.7	.529	.000	.604	4.7	.9	.6	.7	6.8
1993–94	Charlotte	77	18	21.4	.524	–	.646	4.6	1.2	**.8**	.6	7.7
1994–95	Charlotte	21	0	19.5	.470	.000	.608	3.6	.8	.3	.7	6.0
1995–96	Vancouver	25	14	22.8	.479	–	.603	4.6	.6	.4	.4	9.2
Career		494	130	20.1	.520	.083	.649	4.7	.9	.6	.7	7.9

==== Playoffs ====
Year	Team	GP	GS	MPG	FG%	3P%	FT%	RPG	APG	SPG	BPG	PPG
1993	Charlotte	**9**	0	**20.8**	.478	–	.429	**4.3**	**1.2**	**.6**	**.1**	**5.9**
1995	Charlotte	4	0	14.5	**.625**	–	**.625**	3.0	.5	.5	.0	3.8
Career		13	0	18.8	.500	–	.483	3.9	1.0	.5	.1	5.2
