= Milwaukee Bucks accomplishments and records =

This page details the all-time statistics, records, and other achievements pertaining to the Milwaukee Bucks.

== Individual awards ==
NBA MVP

- Kareem Abdul-Jabbar – 1971, 1972, 1974
- Giannis Antetokounmpo – 2019, 2020

NBA Finals MVP

- Kareem Abdul-Jabbar – 1971
- Giannis Antetokounmpo – 2021

NBA Cup MVP

- Giannis Antetokounmpo – 2024

NBA Defensive Player of the Year

- Sidney Moncrief – 1983, 1984
- Giannis Antetokounmpo – 2020

NBA Rookie of the Year

- Kareem Abdul-Jabbar – 1970
- Malcolm Brogdon – 2017

NBA Most Improved Player

- Giannis Antetokounmpo – 2017

NBA Sixth Man of the Year

- Ricky Pierce – 1987, 1990

NBA Sportsmanship Award

- Jrue Holiday – 2021

NBA Coach of the Year

- Don Nelson – 1983, 1985
- Mike Budenholzer – 2019

NBA Executive of the Year

- John Hammond – 2010
- Jon Horst – 2019

NBA Teammate of the Year

- Jrue Holiday – 2022, 2023

All-NBA First Team

- Kareem Abdul-Jabbar – 1971–1974
- Marques Johnson – 1979
- Sidney Moncrief – 1983
- Giannis Antetokounmpo – 2019–2025

All-NBA Second Team

- Kareem Abdul-Jabbar – 1970
- Oscar Robertson – 1971
- Marques Johnson – 1980, 1981
- Sidney Moncrief – 1982, 1984, 1985, 1986
- Terry Cummings – 1985
- Giannis Antetokounmpo – 2017, 2018

All-NBA Third Team

- Terry Cummings – 1989
- Vin Baker – 1997
- Ray Allen – 2001
- Michael Redd – 2004
- Andrew Bogut – 2010

NBA All-Defensive First Team

- Kareem Abdul-Jabbar – 1974, 1975
- Sidney Moncrief – 1983–1986
- Paul Pressey – 1985, 1986
- Alvin Robertson – 1991
- Giannis Antetokounmpo – 2019, 2020, 2021, 2022
- Eric Bledsoe – 2019
- Jrue Holiday – 2021, 2023
- Brook Lopez – 2023

NBA All-Defensive Second Team

- Kareem Abdul-Jabbar – 1970, 1971
- Quinn Buckner – 1978, 1980, 1981, 1982
- Sidney Moncrief – 1982
- Paul Pressey – 1987
- Alvin Robertson – 1990
- Giannis Antetokounmpo – 2017
- Brook Lopez – 2020
- Eric Bledsoe – 2020
- Jrue Holiday – 2022

NBA All-Rookie First Team

- Kareem Abdul-Jabbar – 1970
- Bob Dandridge – 1970
- Marques Johnson – 1978
- Vin Baker – 1994
- Glenn Robinson – 1995
- Andrew Bogut – 2005
- Brandon Jennings – 2010
- Malcolm Brogdon – 2017

NBA All-Rookie Second Team

- Ray Allen – 1997
- T. J. Ford – 2004
- Giannis Antetokounmpo – 2014

=== NBA All-Star Weekend ===
NBA All-Star Game Selections

- Jon McGlocklin – 1969
- Flynn Robinson – 1970
- Kareem Abdul-Jabbar – 1970–1975
- Oscar Robertson – 1971, 1972
- Bob Dandridge – 1973, 1975, 1976
- Jim Price – 1975
- Brian Winters – 1976, 1978
- Marques Johnson – 1979, 1980, 1981, 1983
- Bob Lanier – 1982
- Sidney Moncrief – 1982–1986
- Terry Cummings – 1985, 1989
- Ricky Pierce – 1991
- Alvin Robertson – 1991
- Vin Baker – 1995, 1996, 1997
- Glenn Robinson – 2000, 2001
- Ray Allen – 2000, 2001, 2002
- Michael Redd – 2004
- Giannis Antetokounmpo – 2017–2025
- Khris Middleton – 2019, 2020, 2022
- Jrue Holiday – 2023
- Damian Lillard – 2024, 2025

All-Star Most Valuable Player

- Giannis Antetokounmpo – 2021
- Damian Lillard – 2024

NBA All-Star head coaches

- Larry Costello – 1971, 1974
- Mike Budenholzer – 2019
- Doc Rivers – 2024

== Franchise records for regular season ==
Most points scored in a game
1. Giannis Antetokounmpo – 64
2. Giannis Antetokounmpo – 59
3. Michael Redd – 57
T4. Giannis Antetokounmpo – 55
T4. Brandon Jennings – 55
T4. Kareem Abdul-Jabbar – 55

Highest points per game in a season
1. Kareem Abdul-Jabbar – 34.8
2. Kareem Abdul-Jabbar – 31.7
3. Giannis Antetokounmpo – 31.1
4. Giannis Antetokounmpo – 30.4
5. Giannis Antetokounmpo – 30.4

Most defensive rebounds (since 1973–74)
1. Giannis Antetokounmpo – 7,185
2. Khris Middleton – 3,128
3. Andrew Bogut – 2,662
4. Marques Johnson – 2,455
5. Terry Cummings – 2,541

Most offensive rebounds (since 1973–74)
1. Giannis Antetokounmpo – 1,697
2. Marques Johnson – 1,468
3. Sidney Moncrief – 1,393
4. Terry Cummings – 1,307
5. Andrew Bogut – 1,148

Most rebounds in a game
1. Swen Nater – 33
2. Kareem Abdul-Jabbar – 30
3. Kareem Abdul-Jabbar – 29
4. Kareem Abdul-Jabbar – 29
5. Kareem Abdul-Jabbar – 28

Highest rebounds per game in a season
1. Kareem Abdul-Jabbar – 16.6
2. Kareem Abdul-Jabbar – 16.1
3. Kareem Abdul-Jabbar – 16.0
4. Kareem Abdul-Jabbar – 14.5
5. Kareem Abdul-Jabbar – 14.5

Most assists in a game
1. Ramon Sessions – 24
2. Guy Rodgers – 21
3. Giannis Antetokounmpo – 20
T4. Brandon Jennings – 19
T4. Sam Cassell – 19
T4. John Lucas II – 19

(As of the end of the 2025–26 season)

Bold denotes still active with team.

Italic denotes still active, but not with team.

=== Games played ===
Most games played
Player	Games
**Giannis Antetokounmpo**	895
Khris Middleton	735
Junior Bridgeman	711
Sidney Moncrief	695
Bob Dandridge	618
Jon McGlocklin	595
Ersan İlyasova	583
Brian Winters	582
Paul Pressey	580
Michael Redd	578

=== Minutes played ===
Most minutes played
Player	Minutes
**Giannis Antetokounmpo**	29,272
Khris Middleton	23,039
Bob Dandridge	22,094
Sidney Moncrief	22,054
Glenn Robinson	21,262
Kareem Abdul-Jabbar	19,954
Michael Redd	19,334
Brian Winters	18,422
Marques Johnson	18,240
Junior Bridgeman	18,054

=== Points ===
Most points
Player	Points
**Giannis Antetokounmpo**	21,531
Kareem Abdul-Jabbar	14,211
Khris Middleton	12,586
Glenn Robinson	12,010
Sidney Moncrief	11,594
Michael Redd	11,554
Bob Dandridge	11,478
Marques Johnson	10,980
Junior Bridgeman	9,892
Brian Winters	9,743

=== Rebounds ===
Most rebounds
Player	Rebounds
**Giannis Antetokounmpo**	8,882
Kareem Abdul-Jabbar	7,161
Bob Dandridge	4,497
Marques Johnson	3,923
Andrew Bogut	3,810
Terry Cummings	3,758
Khris Middleton	3,598
Glenn Robinson	3,519
Sidney Moncrief	3,447
Ersan İlyasova	3,343

=== Assists ===
Most assists
Player	Assists
**Giannis Antetokounmpo**	4,484
Paul Pressey	3,272
Khris Middleton	2,990
Sidney Moncrief	2,689
Brian Winters	2,479
Quinn Buckner	2,391
Sam Cassell	2,269
Oscar Robertson	2,156
Kareem Abdul-Jabbar	2,008
Bob Dandridge	1,956

=== Steals ===
Most steals
Player	Steals
Quinn Buckner	1,042
**Giannis Antetokounmpo**	995
Paul Pressey	894
Sidney Moncrief	874
Khris Middleton	870
Alvin Robertson	753
Brian Winters	718
Marques Johnson	697
Glenn Robinson	689
Ray Allen	618

=== Blocks ===
Most blocks
Player	Blocks
**Giannis Antetokounmpo**	1,088
Brook Lopez	990
Alton Lister	804
Harvey Catchings	709
Andrew Bogut	642
John Henson	600
Ervin Johnson	586
Kareem Abdul-Jabbar	495
Randy Breuer	474
Marques Johnson	439

=== Field goals ===
Most field goals made
Player	Field goals
**Giannis Antetokounmpo**	7,898
Kareem Abdul-Jabbar	5,902
Bob Dandridge	4,826
Glenn Robinson	4,723
Khris Middleton	4,574
Marques Johnson	4,546
Junior Bridgeman	4,142
Brian Winters	4,131
Michael Redd	4,063
Sidney Moncrief	4,000

=== 3–Pt Field goals ===
Most 3–Pt field goals made
Player	3-Pt's Made
Khris Middleton	1,382
Ray Allen	1,051
Michael Redd	1,003
Brook Lopez	826
**Bobby Portis**	602
Pat Connaughton	585
**Giannis Antetokounmpo**	557
Brandon Jennings	554
Ersan İlyasova	536
**A.J. Green**	500

=== Free throws ===
Most Free Throws Made
Player	Free Throws
**Giannis Antetokounmpo**	5,178
Sidney Moncrief	3,505
Michael Redd	2,425
Kareem Abdul-Jabbar	2,407
Glenn Robinson	2,070
Khris Middleton	2,056
Marques Johnson	1,880
Bob Dandridge	1,826
Ray Allen	1,816
Ricky Pierce	1,749

== Franchise record for championships ==
Championships
Championships	Seasons
NBA Championships
2	1971, 2021
Conference Championships
3	1971, 1974, 2021
Division Championships
19	1971, 1972, 1973, 1974, 1976, 1980, 1981, 1982, 1983, 1984, 1985, 1986, 2001, 2019, 2020, 2021, 2022, 2023, 2024
Regular season Championships
1	2023
NBA Cups
1	2024

== See also ==
- NBA records
