= Miami Heat accomplishments and records =

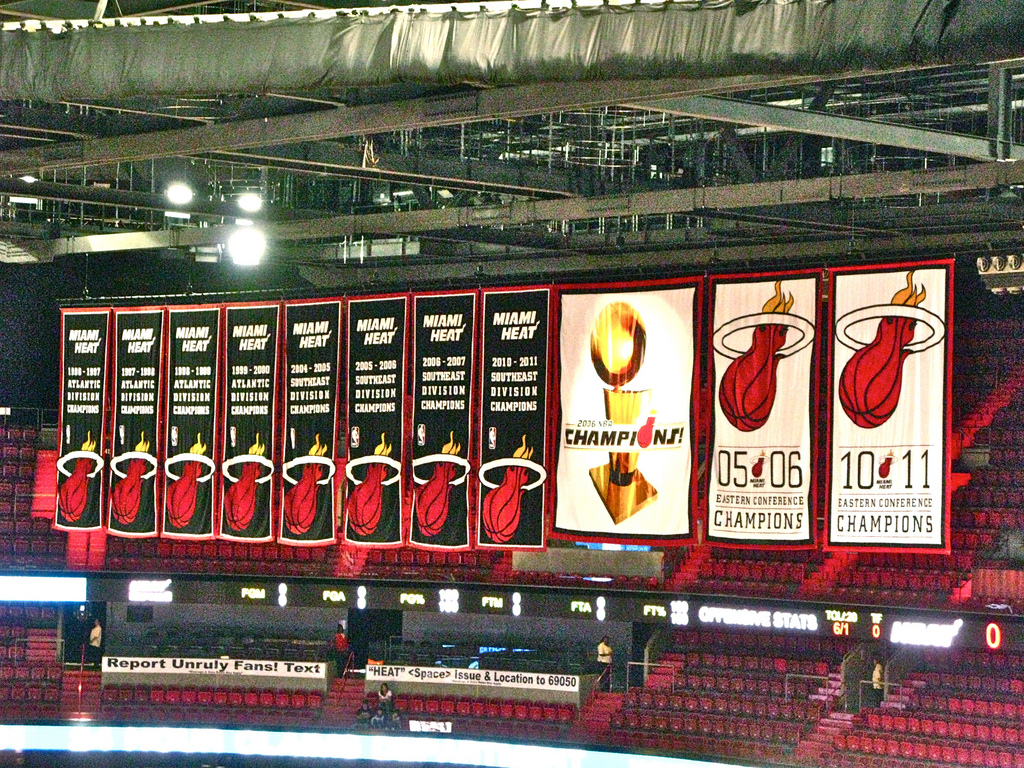
2006 Miami Heat NBA Championship banner hanging from the rafters at American Airlines Arena

This page details the all-time statistics, records, and other achievements pertaining to the Miami Heat. The Miami Heat is an American professional basketball team currently playing in the National Basketball Association.

== Franchise accomplishments and awards ==
=== Individual awards ===
NBA Most Valuable Player

- LeBron James – 2012, 2013

NBA Finals MVP

- Dwyane Wade – 2006
- LeBron James – 2012, 2013

NBA Conference Finals Most Valuable Player Award

- Jimmy Butler – 2023

NBA All-Star Game MVP

- Dwyane Wade – 2010

NBA Scoring Champion

- Dwyane Wade – 2009

NBA Defensive Player of the Year

- Alonzo Mourning – 1999, 2000

NBA Most Improved Player Award

- Rony Seikaly – 1990
- Isaac Austin – 1997

NBA Sixth Man of the Year

- Tyler Herro – 2022

Best NBA Player ESPY Award

- Dwyane Wade – 2006
- LeBron James - 2012

NBA Coach of the Year

- Pat Riley – 1997

NBA Executive of the Year

- Pat Riley – 2011

J. Walter Kennedy Citizenship Award

- P. J. Brown – 1997
- Alonzo Mourning – 2002

All-NBA First Team

- Dwyane Wade – 2009, 2010
- Shaquille O'Neal – 2005, 2006
- LeBron James – 2011–2014
- Alonzo Mourning – 1999
- Tim Hardaway – 1997

All-NBA Second Team

- Dwyane Wade – 2005, 2006, 2011
- Tim Hardaway – 1998, 1999
- Alonzo Mourning – 2000
- Jimmy Butler – 2023

All-NBA Third Team

- Dwyane Wade – 2007, 2012, 2013
- Jimmy Butler – 2020, 2021

NBA All-Defensive First Team

- Alonzo Mourning – 1999, 2000
- LeBron James – 2011, 2012, 2013
- Bam Adebayo – 2024

NBA All-Defensive Second Team

- P.J. Brown – 1997, 1999
- Bruce Bowen – 2001
- Dwyane Wade – 2005, 2009, 2010
- LeBron James – 2014
- Hassan Whiteside – 2016
- Bam Adebayo – 2020, 2021
- Jimmy Butler – 2021

NBA All-Rookie First Team

- Sherman Douglas – 1990
- Steve Smith – 1992
- Caron Butler – 2003
- Dwyane Wade – 2004
- Michael Beasley – 2009
- Kendrick Nunn – 2020
- Jaime Jaquez Jr. – 2024

NBA All-Rookie Second Team

- Kevin Edwards – 1989
- Glen Rice – 1990
- Willie Burton – 1991
- Udonis Haslem – 2004
- Mario Chalmers – 2009
- Justise Winslow– 2016
- Tyler Herro – 2020

=== NBA All-Star Weekend ===
NBA All-Star Game MVP

- Dwyane Wade - 2010

NBA All-Star Skills Challenge Champion

- Dwyane Wade – 2006, 2007
- Bam Adebayo – 2020

NBA All-Star Three-point Shootout Champion

- Glen Rice – 1995
- Jason Kapono – 2007
- Daequan Cook – 2009
- James Jones – 2011
- Tyler Herro – 2025

NBA All-Star Slam Dunk Contest Champion

- Harold Miner – 1993, 1995
- Derrick Jones Jr. – 2020

NBA All-Star Selections

- Alonzo Mourning – 1996, 1997, 2000, 2001, 2002
- Tim Hardaway – 1997, 1998
- Anthony Mason – 2001
- Shaquille O'Neal – 2005, 2006, 2007
- Dwyane Wade – 2005–2016, 2019
- LeBron James – 2011–2014
- Chris Bosh – 2011–2016
- Goran Dragic – 2018
- Jimmy Butler – 2020, 2022
- Bam Adebayo – 2020, 2023, 2024
- Tyler Herro – 2025
- Stan Van Gundy – 2005 (as Head Coach)
- Erik Spoelstra - 2013, 2022 (as Head Coach)

== Franchise records for regular season ==
Most points scored in a game

1. Bam Adebayo – 83
2. LeBron James – 61
3. Glen Rice – 56
4. Dwyane Wade – 55
5. LeBron James – 51
6. Dwyane Wade – 50

Highest points per game in a season

1. Dwyane Wade – 30.2 (2008-09)
2. Dwyane Wade – 27.4 (2006-07)
3. Dwyane Wade – 27.2 (2005-06)
4. LeBron James – 27.1 (2011-12)
5. LeBron James – 27.1 (2013-14)

Most total rebounds

1. Udonis Haslem – 5,791
2. Alonzo Mourning – 4,807
3. Rony Seikaly – 4,544
4. Dwyane Wade – 4,482
5. Hassan Whiteside – 3,870

Most rebounds in a game

1. Rony Seikaly – 34 against the Washington Bullets on March 3, 1993

Most assists in a game

1. Tim Hardaway – 19 against the Milwaukee Bucks on April 19, 1996

Most blocks in a game

1. Hassan Whiteside – 12 against the Chicago Bulls on January 25, 2015

Career triple doubles

1. Jimmy Butler – 11
2. LeBron James – 9
3. Bam Adebayo – 6
4. Dwyane Wade – 5
5. Hassan Whiteside – 4
6. Kyle Lowry – 3
7. Tyler Herro – 1
8. Billy Owens – 1
9. Goran Dragić – 1
10. Lamar Odom – 1
11. Rory Sparrow – 1
12. Shaquille O'Neal – 1
13. Steve Smith – 1

== See also ==
- NBA records
