= Oklahoma City Thunder accomplishments and records =

The Oklahoma City Thunder is a professional American basketball franchise based in Oklahoma City, Oklahoma. It plays in the Northwest Division of the Western Conference in the National Basketball Association (NBA). The franchise was the Seattle SuperSonics from 1967 to 2008 until relocated to Oklahoma City. The team plays its home games at the Paycom Center. The Thunder is owned by Professional Basketball Club LLC and coached by Mark Daigneault, with Sam Presti as its General Manager. All records and achievements shown have been accomplished in Oklahoma City.

This is a list of the accomplishments and records of the Oklahoma City Thunder following their move from Seattle, Washington where they were known as the Seattle SuperSonics. For the SuperSonics accomplishments and records see Seattle SuperSonics Records.

== Individual records ==
=== Franchise leaders ===
Bold denotes still active with team.

Italic denotes still active but not with team.

All records and achievements have been accomplished as the Oklahoma City Thunder

Points scored (regular season)

(as of the beginning of the 2026–27 season)

1. Russell Westbrook (18,859)
2. Kevin Durant (15,942)
3. **Shai Gilgeous-Alexander** (12,989)
4. Serge Ibaka (6,054)
5. Steven Adams (5,191)
6. Luguentz Dort (5,018)
7. **Jalen Williams** (4,505)
8. Paul George (3,893)
9. Jeff Green (3,273)
10. **Chet Holmgren** (3,053)
11. Aaron Wiggins (2,962)
12. Josh Giddey (2,920)
13. Isaiah Joe (2,868)
14. Nick Collison (2,846)
15. James Harden (2,795)
16. Enes Kanter Freedom (2,556)
17. **Kenrich Williams** (2,548)
18. Dennis Schröder (2,453)
19. Thabo Sefolosha (2,284)
20. Reggie Jackson (2,202)

==== Other statistics (regular season) ====
(As of the beginning of the 2026–27 season)

Most minutes played
Player	Minutes
Russell Westbrook	28,330
Kevin Durant	21,440
**Shai Gilgeous-Alexander**	15,874
Serge Ibaka	15,099
Steven Adams	14,207
Luguentz Dort	12,468
Nick Collison	11,158
Thabo Sefolosha	9,842
**Jalen Williams**	7,765
Jeff Green	7,731

Most rebounds
Player	Rebounds
Russell Westbrook	5,760
Kevin Durant	4,170
Steven Adams	4,029
Serge Ibaka	3,875
Nick Collison	2,561
**Shai Gilgeous-Alexander**	2,333
Luguentz Dort	1,648
Kendrick Perkins	1,611
**Chet Holmgren**	1,548
Josh Giddey	1,534

Most assists
Player	Assists
Russell Westbrook	6,897
**Shai Gilgeous-Alexander**	2,604
Kevin Durant	2,171
Josh Giddey	1,200
**Jalen Williams**	1,115
Reggie Jackson	738
Luguentz Dort	670
**Kenrich Williams**	655
Nick Collison	638
Steven Adams	615

Most steals
Player	Steals
Russell Westbrook	1,442
Kevin Durant	696
**Shai Gilgeous-Alexander**	679
Steven Adams	469
Thabo Sefolosha	453
Luguentz Dort	410
**Cason Wallace**	353
**Jalen Williams**	336
Paul George	331
Nick Collison	296

Most blocks
Player	Blocks
Serge Ibaka	1,300
Kevin Durant	564
Steven Adams	531
**Chet Holmgren**	401
**Shai Gilgeous-Alexander**	391
Nick Collison	258
Jerami Grant	252
Russell Westbrook	250
Kendrick Perkins	242
André Roberson	198

Most three-pointers made
Player	3-pointers made
Kevin Durant	1,084
Russell Westbrook	922
Luguentz Dort	862
**Shai Gilgeous-Alexander**	711
Isaiah Joe	681
Paul George	536
Aaron Wiggins	378
**Kenrich Williams**	334
**Jalen Williams**	326
James Harden	320

== Single Game Records ==
=== Individual ===
==== Most points scored in a game ====
(Correct as of the end of the 2025–26 season)

Most Points Scored in a Single Game
58 Point Games
Player	Points	Opponent	Dates
Russell Westbrook	58	Portland Trail Blazers	March 8, 2017
57 Point Games
Russell Westbrook	57	Orlando Magic	March 29, 2017
55 Point Games
Shai Gilgeous-Alexander	55	Indiana Pacers	October 23, 2025
54 Point Games
Kevin Durant	54	Golden State Warriors	January 17, 2014
Russell Westbrook	54	Indiana Pacers	April 12, 2015
Shai Gilgeous-Alexander	54	Utah Jazz	January 22, 2025
52 Point Games
Kevin Durant	52	Dallas Mavericks	January 18, 2013
Shai Gilgeous-Alexander	52	Golden State Warriors	January 29, 2025
51 Point Games
Kevin Durant	51	Denver Nuggets	February 19, 2012
Kevin Durant	51	Toronto Raptors	March 21, 2014
Russell Westbrook	51	Phoenix Suns	October 28, 2016
Shai Gilgeous-Alexander	51	Houston Rockets	March 3, 2025
50 Point Games
Russell Westbrook	50	Denver Nuggets	April 9, 2017
Shai Gilgeous-Alexander	50	Phoenix Suns	February 5, 2025

=== In a game ===
- Largest margin of victory in a home game - 62 vs Portland Trail Blazers on 1-11-2024
- Largest margin of victory in a road game - 43 @ Portland Trail Blazers on 11-19-2023
- Largest margin of defeat in a home game - 57 vs Indiana Pacers on 5-1-2021
- Largest margin of defeat in a road game - 73 @ Memphis Grizzlies on 12-2-2021 (NBA record)
- Most points scored in a winning game - 153 vs Houston Rockets on 4-4-2023
- Most points scored in a losing game - 147 @ San Antonio Spurs on 1-10-2019 (2 OT)
- Most points allowed in a winning game - 147 vs Utah Jazz on 2-22-2019
- Most points allowed in a losing game - 154 @ San Antonio Spurs on 1-10-2019 (2 OT)
- Most points scored in a first half - 87 vs Denver Nuggets on 5-7-2025 (NBA playoff record)
- Most points scored in a second half - 79 vs Phoenix Suns on 2-5-2025
- Fewest points scored in a winning game - 77 vs LA Lakers on 5-16-2012
- Fewest points scored in a losing game - 65 vs Houston Rockets on 11-16-2014
- Fewest points allowed in a winning game - 69 @ Chicago Bulls on 10-28-2017, @ Phoenix Suns on 2-10-2013, vs Charlotte Bobcats on 11-26-2012
- Fewest points allowed in a losing game - 69 @ Houston Rockets on 11-16-2014
- Most points scored in the first quarter - 47 @ Minnesota Timberwolves 4-15-2015
- Most points scored in the second quarter - 46 vs Sacramento Kings 2-1-2025
- Most points scored in the third quarter - 48 vs Boston Celtics 1-3-2023
- Most points scored in the fourth quarter - 42 @ Detroit Piston 12-6-2021, @ Portland Trail Blazers 11-27-2019, @ Orlando Magic 10-30-2015

== Award winners ==
(Correct as of the 2025–26 NBA season)

NBA MVP Award

- Kevin Durant – 2014
- Russell Westbrook – 2017
- Shai Gilgeous-Alexander – 2025, 2026

NBA Western Conference finals MVP

- Shai Gilgeous-Alexander – 2025

NBA Finals MVP

- Shai Gilgeous-Alexander – 2025

NBA Scoring Champion

- Kevin Durant – 2009–2010 (30.1 PPG)
- Kevin Durant – 2010–2011 (27.7 PPG)
- Kevin Durant – 2011–2012 (28.0 PPG)
- Kevin Durant – 2013–2014 (32.0 PPG)
- Russell Westbrook – 2014–2015 (28.1 PPG)
- Russell Westbrook – 2016–2017 (31.6 PPG)
- Shai Gilgeous-Alexander – 2024–2025 (32.7 PPG)

NBA Assists Leader

- Russell Westbrook – 2017–2018 (10.3 APG)
- Russell Westbrook – 2018–2019 (10.7 APG)

NBA Blocks Leader

- Serge Ibaka – 2011–2012 (3.6 BPG)
- Serge Ibaka – 2012–2013 (3.03 BPG)

NBA Coach of the Year Award

- Scott Brooks – 2010
- Mark Daigneault – 2024

NBA Sixth Man of the Year Award

- James Harden – 2012

NBA Community Assist Award

- Russell Westbrook – 2015

All-NBA First Team

- Kevin Durant – 2010, 2011, 2012, 2013, 2014
- Russell Westbrook – 2016, 2017
- Paul George – 2019
- Shai Gilgeous-Alexander – 2023, 2024, 2025, 2026

All-NBA Second Team

- Russell Westbrook – 2011, 2012, 2013, 2015, 2018
- Kevin Durant – 2016
- Chris Paul – 2020

All-NBA Third Team

- Russell Westbrook – 2019
- Paul George – 2018
- Jalen Williams – 2025
- Chet Holmgren — 2026

NBA All-Defensive First Team

- Serge Ibaka – 2012, 2013, 2014
- Paul George – 2019
- Luguentz Dort – 2025
- Chet Holmgren – 2026

NBA All-Defensive Second Team

- Thabo Sefolosha – 2010
- Andre Roberson – 2017
- Jalen Williams – 2025
- Cason Wallace – 2026

NBA All-Rookie First Team

- Russell Westbrook – 2009
- Jalen Williams – 2023
- Chet Holmgren – 2024

NBA All-Rookie Second Team

- James Harden – 2010
- Steven Adams – 2014
- Josh Giddey – 2022
- Cason Wallace – 2024

NBA All-Star Game Selections

- Kevin Durant – 2010–2016
- Russell Westbrook – 2011–2013, 2015–2019
- Paul George – 2018–2019
- Chris Paul – 2020
- Shai Gilgeous-Alexander – 2023–2026
- Jalen Williams – 2025
- Chet Holmgren – 2026

NBA All-Star Game Most Valuable Player Award

- Kevin Durant – 2012
- Russell Westbrook – 2015–2016

NBA All-Star head coach

- Scott Brooks – 2012, 2014

Slam Dunk Contest

- Hamidou Diallo – 2019

Rising Stars Challenge MVP

- Kevin Durant – 2009

Rising Stars Challenge Team

- Kevin Durant – 2009
- Jeff Green – 2009
- Russell Westbrook – 2009, 2010
- James Harden – 2010, 2011
- Serge Ibaka – 2011
- Steven Adams – 2014, 2015
- Alex Abrines – 2017
- Domantas Sabonis – 2017
- Shai Gilgeous-Alexander – 2020
- Luguentz Dort – 2021
- Théo Maledon – 2021
- Josh Giddey – 2022, 2023
- Jalen Williams – 2023
- Cason Wallace – 2024
- Ajay Mitchell – 2026

== See also ==
- NBA records
