= Phoenix Suns accomplishments and records =

This page details the all-time statistics, records, and other achievements pertaining to the Phoenix Suns.

== Individual awards ==
NBA Most Valuable Player Award

- Charles Barkley — 1993
- Steve Nash — 2005, 2006

NBA Rookie of the Year Award

- Alvan Adams — 1976
- Walter Davis — 1978
- Amar'e Stoudemire — 2003

NBA Sixth Man of the Year Award

- Eddie Johnson — 1989
- Danny Manning — 1998
- Rodney Rogers — 2000
- Leandro Barbosa — 2007

NBA Sportsmanship Award

- Grant Hill — 2008, 2010

NBA Most Improved Player Award

- Kevin Johnson — 1989
- Boris Diaw — 2006
- Goran Dragić — 2014

NBA Coach of the Year Award

- Cotton Fitzsimmons — 1989
- Mike D'Antoni — 2005
- Monty Williams — 2022

NBA Executive of the Year Award

- Jerry Colangelo – 1976, 1981, 1989, 1993
- Bryan Colangelo – 2005
- James Jones – 2021

J. Walter Kennedy Citizenship Award

- Kevin Johnson – 1991
- Steve Nash – 2007

Best NBA Player ESPY Award

- Charles Barkley — 1994
- Steve Nash — 2005

All-NBA First Team

- Connie Hawkins — 1970
- Paul Westphal — 1977, 1979, 1980
- Dennis Johnson — 1981
- Charles Barkley — 1993
- Jason Kidd — 1999, 2000, 2001
- Steve Nash — 2005, 2006, 2007
- Amar'e Stoudemire — 2007
- Devin Booker — 2022

All-NBA Second Team

- Paul Westphal — 1978
- Walter Davis — 1978, 1979
- Kevin Johnson — 1989, 1990, 1991, 1994
- Tom Chambers — 1989, 1990
- Charles Barkley — 1994, 1995
- Amar'e Stoudemire — 2005, 2008, 2010
- Steve Nash — 2008, 2010
- Chris Paul — 2021
- Kevin Durant — 2024

All-NBA Third Team

- Kevin Johnson — 1992
- Charles Barkley — 1996
- Stephon Marbury — 2003
- Shawn Marion — 2005, 2006
- Shaquille O'Neal — 2009
- Goran Dragić — 2014
- Chris Paul — 2022
- Devin Booker — 2024

NBA All-Defensive First Team

- Don Buse — 1978, 1979, 1980
- Dennis Johnson — 1981, 1982, 1983
- Jason Kidd — 1999, 2001
- Raja Bell — 2007
- Mikal Bridges — 2022

NBA All-Defensive Second Team

- Paul Silas — 1971, 1972, 1973
- Dick Van Arsdale — 1974
- Dan Majerle — 1991, 1993
- Jason Kidd — 2000
- Clifford Robinson — 2000
- Raja Bell — 2008

NBA All-Rookie First Team

- Gary Gregor — 1969
- Mike Bantom — 1974
- Alvan Adams — 1976
- Ron Lee — 1977
- Walter Davis — 1978
- Armon Gilliam — 1988
- Michael Finley — 1996
- Amar'e Stoudemire — 2003
- Devin Booker — 2016
- Deandre Ayton — 2019

NBA All-Rookie Second Team

- Richard Dumas — 1993
- Wesley Person — 1995
- Shawn Marion — 2000
- Joe Johnson — 2002
- Marquese Chriss — 2017
- Josh Jackson — 2018

=== NBA All-Star Weekend ===
NBA All-Star Game Selections

NBA All-Star Game head coach

- John MacLeod — 1981
- Paul Westphal — 1993, 1995
- Mike D'Antoni — 2007
- Monty Williams — 2022

NBA All-Star Game Most Valuable Player Award

- Shaquille O'Neal — 2009

NBA All-Star Weekend Three-Point Shootout

- Quentin Richardson — 2005
- Devin Booker — 2018

NBA All-Star Weekend Skills Challenge

- Steve Nash — 2005, 2010

NBA All-Star Weekend Slam Dunk Contest

- Larry Nance — 1984
- Cedric Ceballos — 1992

== Franchise leaders ==
(As of the 2025–26 season)

Bold denotes still active with team.

Italic denotes still active, but not with team.

=== Games played ===
Most Games Played
Player	Games
Alvan Adams	988
Walter Davis	766
Steve Nash	744
**Devin Booker**	737
Dick Van Arsdale	685
Kevin Johnson	683
Shawn Marion	660
Alvin Scott	627
Dan Majerle	595
Leandro Barbosa	553

=== Points ===
Most Points Scored
Player	Points
**Devin Booker**	18,120
Walter Davis	15,666
Alvan Adams	13,910
Kevin Johnson	12,747
Shawn Marion	12,134
Dick Van Arsdale	12,060
Amar'e Stoudemire	11,035
Steve Nash	10,712
Paul Westphal	9,564
Larry Nance	8,430

=== Minutes Played ===
Most Minutes Played
Player	Minutes
Alvan Adams	27,203
**Devin Booker**	25,295
Shawn Marion	24,948
Dick Van Arsdale	24,242
Kevin Johnson	24,018
Walter Davis	23,143
Steve Nash	22,781
Dan Majerle	19,409
Amar'e Stoudemire	17,686
Larry Nance	15,731

=== Rebounds ===
Most Rebounds
Player	Rebounds
Alvan Adams	6,937
Shawn Marion	6,616
Amar'e Stoudemire	4,613
Larry Nance	3,791
Neal Walk	3,637
Mark West	3,241
Charles Barkley	3,232
Deandre Ayton	3,152
**Devin Booker**	2,966
Paul Silas	2,886

=== Assists ===
Most Assists
Player	Assists
Steve Nash	6,997
Kevin Johnson	6,518
Alvan Adams	4,012
**Devin Booker**	3,908
Walter Davis	3,340
Jason Kidd	3,011
Jeff Hornacek	2,523
Paul Westphal	2,429
Dick Van Arsdale	2,396
Jay Humphries	1,862

=== Steals ===
Most Steals
Player	Steals
Alvan Adams	1,289
Shawn Marion	1,245
Walter Davis	1,040
Kevin Johnson	1,022
Dan Majerle	811
Paul Westphal	753
Jeff Hornacek	692
Jason Kidd	655
**Devin Booker**	628
Larry Nance	516

=== Blocks ===
Most Blocks
Player	Blocks
Larry Nance	940
Mark West	897
Shawn Marion	894
Alvan Adams	808
Amar'e Stoudemire	722
Andrew Lang	509
Alvin Scott	371
Alex Len	344
Oliver Miller	336
Garfield Heard	303

=== Field goals ===
Most Field Goals Made
Player	Field Goals
Walter Davis	6,497
**Devin Booker**	6,295
Alvan Adams	5,709
Shawn Marion	4,879
Kevin Johnson	4,369
Dick Van Arsdale	4,328
Amar'e Stoudemire	3,998
Steve Nash	3,936
Paul Westphal	3,785
Larry Nance	3,425

=== Three point field goals ===
Most Three Point Field Goals Made
Player	Threes Made
**Devin Booker**	1,546
Steve Nash	1,051
Dan Majerle	800
Leandro Barbosa	751
Shawn Marion	652
Raja Bell	622
Channing Frye	594
Jared Dudley	543
Mikal Bridges	525
**Grayson Allen**	513

=== Free throws ===
Most Free Throws Made
Player	Free Throws
**Devin Booker**	3,984
Kevin Johnson	3,851
Dick Van Arsdale	3,404
Amar'e Stoudemire	3,044
Walter Davis	2,557
Alvan Adams	2,490
Paul Westphal	1,961
Tom Chambers	1,944
Connie Hawkins	1,830
Steve Nash	1,789

== Franchise record for championships ==
Championships
Championships	Seasons
NBA Championships
0	0
Conference Championships
3	1976, 1993, 2021
Division Championships
8	1981, 1993, 1995, 2005, 2006, 2007, 2021, 2022

== See also ==
- Phoenix Suns Ring of Honor
- NBA records
