= Houston Rockets accomplishments and records =

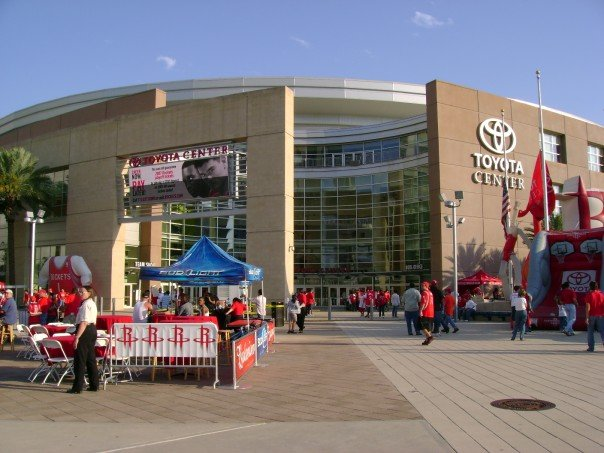
The Rockets moved into the Toyota Center at the start of the 2003–2004 season

The Houston Rockets are an American professional basketball franchise based in Houston, Texas. The team plays in the Southwest Division of the Western Conference in the National Basketball Association (NBA). The team was established in 1967, and played in San Diego, California for four years, before relocating to Houston. They have made the playoffs in 25 of their 42 seasons, and won their division and conference four times each; they also won back-to-back NBA championships in 1994 and 1995. They won 22 straight games during the 2007–08 season, the third-longest streak in NBA history.

Hakeem Olajuwon, the NBA Finals Most Valuable Player in both of the Rockets' championship seasons, played for the Rockets for 17 years and is the career leader for the franchise in 9 categories. He also holds the NBA records for blocks in a playoff game and most points and blocks in a 4-game playoff series. Moses Malone, who played 6 of 19 seasons for the Rockets, had the most points, rebounds, and free throws made in a season for the Rockets, and he also holds the NBA records for most offensive rebounds in a regular season and playoff game.

The individual player records section lists the Rockets career leaders in major statistical categories, as well as franchise records for single seasons and games. The team section lists the Rockets' teams that have recorded the highest and lowest totals in a category in a single season and game, and any NBA records that the Rockets have set as a team.

== Individual records ==
=== Franchise leaders ===
Bold denotes still active with team. Italics denotes still active but not with team.

Points scored (regular season) (as of the end of the 2025–26 season)

1. Hakeem Olajuwon (26,511)
2. James Harden (18,365)
3. Calvin Murphy (17,949)
4. Rudy Tomjanovich (13,383)
5. Elvin Hayes (11,762)
6. Moses Malone (11,119)
7. Yao Ming (9,247)
8. Robert Reid (8,823)
9. Mike Newlin (8,480)
10. Otis Thorpe (8,177)
11. Cuttino Mobley (7,448)
12. Steve Francis (7,281)
13. Tracy McGrady (6,888)
14. Allen Leavell (6,684)
15. Jalen Green (6,173)
16. **Alperen Şengün** (6,049)
17. Vernon Maxwell (6,002)
18. Ralph Sampson (5,995)
19. Eric Gordon (5,944)
20. Kenny Smith (5,910)
21. Luis Scola (5,597)
22. Rodney McCray (5,059)
23. Sleepy Floyd (5,030)
24. Stu Lantz (4,947)
25. Trevor Ariza (4,863)
26. Lewis Lloyd (4,384)
27. **Clint Capela** (4,357)
28. Clyde Drexler (4,155)
29. Buck Johnson (4,139)
30. John Block (4,138)
31. Don Kojis (4,037)
32. **Jabari Smith Jr.** (3,967)
33. John Lucas II (3,756)
34. Kevin Kunnert (3,550)
35. Aaron Brooks (3,465)
36. Rafer Alston (3,370)
37. Mario Elie (3,356)
38. Robert Horry (3,109)
39. Kevin Martin (3,068)
40. Shane Battier (3,052)
41. Charles Barkley (3,017)
42. **Amen Thompson** (3,005)
43. Chandler Parsons (3,002)
44. Matt Bullard (2,991)
45. Dwight Howard (2,919)
46. Ed Ratleff (2,813)
47. Jim Barnett (2,794)
48. Patrick Beverley (2,708)
49. Mitchell Wiggins (2,648)
50. Maurice Taylor (2,619)

Other Statistics (regular season) (as of the end of the 2025–26 season)

Most minutes played
Player	Minutes
Hakeem Olajuwon	42,844
Calvin Murphy	30,607
Rudy Tomjanovich	25,714
James Harden	23,006
Robert Reid	21,718
Elvin Hayes	20,782
Otis Thorpe	18,631
Moses Malone	17,780
Mike Newlin	17,646
Cuttino Mobley	16,343

Most rebounds
Player	Rebounds
Hakeem Olajuwon	13,382
Elvin Hayes	6,974
Moses Malone	6,959
Rudy Tomjanovich	6,198
Otis Thorpe	5,010
Yao Ming	4,494
James Harden	3,736
Robert Reid	3,706
**Clint Capela**	3,588
Ralph Sampson	3,189

Most assists
Player	Assists
James Harden	4,796
Calvin Murphy	4,402
Allen Leavell	3,339
Hakeem Olajuwon	2,992
Mike Newlin	2,581
Kenny Smith	2,457
Steve Francis	2,411
Sleepy Floyd	2,363
John Lucas II	2,358
Robert Reid	2,253

Most steals
Player	Steals
Hakeem Olajuwon	2,088
Calvin Murphy	1,165
James Harden	1,087
Allen Leavell	929
Robert Reid	881
Trevor Ariza	683
Steve Francis	619
Vernon Maxwell	559
Cuttino Mobley	526
Sleepy Floyd	470

Most blocks
Player	Blocks
Hakeem Olajuwon	3,740
Yao Ming	920
Moses Malone	758
Ralph Sampson	585
**Clint Capela**	554
Kelvin Cato	431
Kevin Kunnert	413
James Harden	390
Robert Reid	364
Shane Battier	351

Most three-pointers made
Player	3-pointers made
James Harden	2,029
Eric Gordon	1,054
Trevor Ariza	876
Jalen Green	779
Vernon Maxwell	730
Cuttino Mobley	672
Shane Battier	576
Matt Bullard	557
**Jabari Smith Jr.**	533
Kenny Smith	521

== Individual honors ==
NBA Most Valuable Player Award

- Moses Malone – 1979, 1982
- Hakeem Olajuwon – 1994
- James Harden – 2018

NBA Finals MVP

- Hakeem Olajuwon – 1994, 1995

NBA Scoring Champions

- Elvin Hayes – 1969
- James Harden – 2018, 2019, 2020

NBA Defensive Player of the Year

- Hakeem Olajuwon – 1993, 1994

NBA Rookie of the Year

- Ralph Sampson – 1984
- Steve Francis – 2000

NBA Sixth Man of the Year

- Eric Gordon – 2017

NBA Most Improved Player

- Aaron Brooks – 2010

NBA Coach of the Year

- Tom Nissalke – 1977
- Don Chaney – 1991
- Mike D'Antoni – 2017

NBA Executive of the Year

- Ray Patterson – 1977
- Daryl Morey – 2018

J. Walter Kennedy Citizenship Award

- Calvin Murphy – 1979
- Dikembe Mutombo – 2009

Best NBA Player ESPY Award

- Hakeem Olajuwon – 1995, 1996

NBA All-Defensive First Team

- Hakeem Olajuwon – 1987, 1988, 1990, 1993, 1994
- Rodney McCray – 1988
- Scottie Pippen – 1999
- Patrick Beverley – 2017

NBA All-Defensive Second Team

- Moses Malone – 1979
- Hakeem Olajuwon – 1985, 1991, 1996, 1997
- Rodney McCray – 1987
- Shane Battier – 2008, 2009
- Ron Artest – 2009
- Patrick Beverley – 2014

NBA All-Rookie First Team

- Elvin Hayes – 1969
- Calvin Murphy – 1971
- Joe Meriweather – 1976
- John Lucas – 1977
- Ralph Sampson – 1984
- Hakeem Olajuwon – 1985
- Steve Francis – 2000
- Yao Ming – 2003
- Luis Scola – 2008

NBA All-Rookie Second Team

- Robert Horry – 1993
- Matt Maloney – 1997
- Cuttino Mobley – 1999
- Michael Dickerson – 1999
- Eddie Griffin – 2002
- Luther Head – 2006
- Carl Landry – 2008
- Chandler Parsons – 2012

All-NBA First Team

- Moses Malone – 1979, 1982
- Hakeem Olajuwon – 1987, 1988, 1989, 1993, 1994, 1997
- James Harden – 2014, 2015, 2017, 2018, 2019, 2020

All-NBA Second Team

- Moses Malone – 1980, 1981
- Ralph Sampson – 1985
- Hakeem Olajuwon – 1986, 1990, 1996
- Yao Ming – 2007, 2009
- Tracy McGrady – 2007
- Dwight Howard – 2014

All-NBA Third Team

- Hakeem Olajuwon – 1991, 1995, 1999
- Clyde Drexler – 1995
- Yao Ming – 2004, 2006, 2008
- Tracy McGrady – 2005, 2008
- James Harden – 2013
- Russell Westbrook – 2020

NBA All-Star Selections

- Don Kojis – 1968, 1969
- Elvin Hayes – 1969–1972
- Jack Marin – 1973
- Rudy Tomjanovich – 1974–1977, 1979
- Moses Malone – 1978–1982
- Calvin Murphy – 1979
- Ralph Sampson – 1984–1987
- Hakeem Olajuwon – 1985–1990, 1992–1997
- Otis Thorpe – 1992
- Charles Barkley – 1997
- Clyde Drexler – 1996, 1997
- Steve Francis – 2002–2004
- Tracy McGrady – 2005–2007
- Yao Ming – 2003–2009, 2011
- James Harden – 2013–2020
- Dwight Howard – 2014
- Russell Westbrook – 2020
- Chris Paul – 2018–2019

All-Star head coach

- Rudy Tomjanovich – 1997
- Mike D'Antoni – 2018

All-Star Game MVP

- Ralph Sampson – 1985

== See also ==
- NBA records

== Notes ==
- ^{a} Shooting percentages in basketball are calculated by taking the number of field goals, three-pointers, or free throws attempted, and dividing it by the corresponding number of shots taken.
- ^{b} A regulation NBA game is 48 minutes long. Both games went to triple overtime.
- ^{c} The record only applies for a player that had 10 or more field goal attempts in a game.
- ^{d} The record only applies for a player that had 5 or more three-point field goals made in a game.
- ^{f} This means that the Rockets made 61 fields goals out of 89 attempted.
- ^{g} Drexler shares this record with 10 other players.
- ^{h} Olajuwon shares this record with Mark Eaton.
- ^{i} This record was achieved in one other game, between the New Jersey Nets and the Portland Trail Blazers.
- ^{j} The Rockets share this record with the Washington Wizards.
- ^{k} The Rockets share this record with the Orlando Magic (January 19, 2009)
- ^{l} The Rockets share this record with the Denver Nuggets (February 13, 2017).
