= Cleveland Cavaliers accomplishments and records =

Stats for a basketball team from Ohio

This page lists the all-time statistics, records, and other achievements of the Cleveland Cavaliers, an American professional basketball team currently playing in the National Basketball Association.

== Single-game records ==
- Points: Donovan Mitchell, 71 (January 2, 2023)
- Rebounds: 25 by Rick Roberson (March 4, 1972) and Anderson Varejão (January 2, 2014)
- Assists: Geoff Huston, 27 (January 27, 1982)
- Steals: Ron Harper, 10 (March 10, 1987)
- Blocks: Larry Nance, 11 (January 7, 1989)
- Turnovers: 11 by Ron Harper (February 22, 1987); Zydrunas Ilgauskas (December 14, 2002); and LeBron James (January 26, 2018)
- Field goals: LeBron James, 23 (November 3, 2017)
- Three-pointers: Kyrie Irving, 11 (January 28, 2015)
- Free throws: LeBron James, 24 (March 12, 2006)

== Single-season records ==
- Minutes: LeBron James, 3,388 (2004–05)
- Points: LeBron James, 2,478 (2005–06)
- Rebounds: Jim Brewer, 891 (1975–76)
- Assists: Andre Miller, 882 (2001–02)
- Steals: Ron Harper, 209 (1986–87)
- Blocks: Larry Nance, 243 (1991–92)
- Turnovers: LeBron James, 347 (2017–18)
- Personal fouls: Shawn Kemp, 371 (1999–2000)
- Field goals: LeBron James, 875 (2005–06)
- Three-pointers: Donovan Mitchell, 245 (2022–23)
- Free throws: LeBron James, 601 (2005–06)
- Field goal percentage: Jarrett Allen, .706 (2024–25)
- Three-point percentage: Steve Kerr, .507 (1989–90)
- Free throw percentage: Mark Price, .948 (1992–93)
- Triple-doubles: LeBron James, 18 (2017–18)

== Career records ==
- Games: LeBron James, 849
- Minutes: LeBron James, 33,130
- Points: LeBron James, 23,119
- Rebounds: LeBron James, 6,190
- Assists: LeBron James, 6,228
- Steals: LeBron James, 1,376
- Blocks: Zydrunas Ilgauskas, 1,269
- Turnovers: LeBron James, 2,973
- Personal fouls: Zydrunas Ilgauskas, 2,591
- Field goals: LeBron James, 8,369
- Three-pointers: LeBron James, 1,251
- Free throws: LeBron James, 5,130
- Field goal percentage: Jarrett Allen, .653
- Three-point percentage: Steve Kerr, .472
- Free throw percentage: Mark Price, .906
- Triple-doubles: LeBron James, 64

== Single-game playoff records ==
- Points: LeBron James, 51 (2018 NBA Finals, Game 1; May 31, 2018)
- Rebounds: Kevin Love, 21 (2017 NBA Finals, Game 1; June 1, 2017)
- Assists: Mark Price, 18 (1990 first round, Game 4; May 3, 1990)
- Steals: 6 by five players, most recently by Jarrett Allen (2025 first round, Game 4; April 28, 2025)
- Blocks: 6 by three players, most recently by Zydrunas Ilgauskas (2006 Eastern Conference Semifinals, Game 5; May 17, 2006)
- Turnovers: LeBron James, 10 (2006 first round, Game 2; April 25, 2006 and 2008 Eastern Conference Semifinals, Game 1; May 6, 2008)
- Field goals: Donovan Mitchell, 22 (2024 first round, Game 6; May 3, 2024)
- Three-pointers: 8 by J. R. Smith (2015 Eastern Conference Finals, Game 1; May 20, 2015) and Kevin Love (2016 Eastern Conference Semifinals, Game 4; May 8, 2016)
- Free throws: LeBron James, 18 (2009 Eastern Conference Finals, Game 3; May 24, 2009)

== Playoff records ==
- Games: LeBron James, 152
- Minutes: LeBron James, 6,421
- Points: LeBron James, 4,573
- Rebounds: LeBron James, 1,388
- Assists: LeBron James, 1,188
- Steals: LeBron James, 264
- Blocks: LeBron James, 162
- Personal fouls: LeBron James, 377
- Field goals: LeBron James, 1,628
- Three-pointers: LeBron James, 247
- Free throws: LeBron James, 1,070
- Field goal percentage: Tristan Thompson, .559
- Three-point percentage: Channing Frye, .541
- Free throw percentage: Mark Price, .944
- Triple-doubles: LeBron James, 18

== See also ==
- NBA records

== Notes ==
1. Ron Harper, Mark Price, Hot Rod Williams, Kevin Love, and Jarrett Allen
2. Nate Thurmond, Larry Nance, and Zydrunas Ilgauskas
