= Charlotte Hornets accomplishments and records =

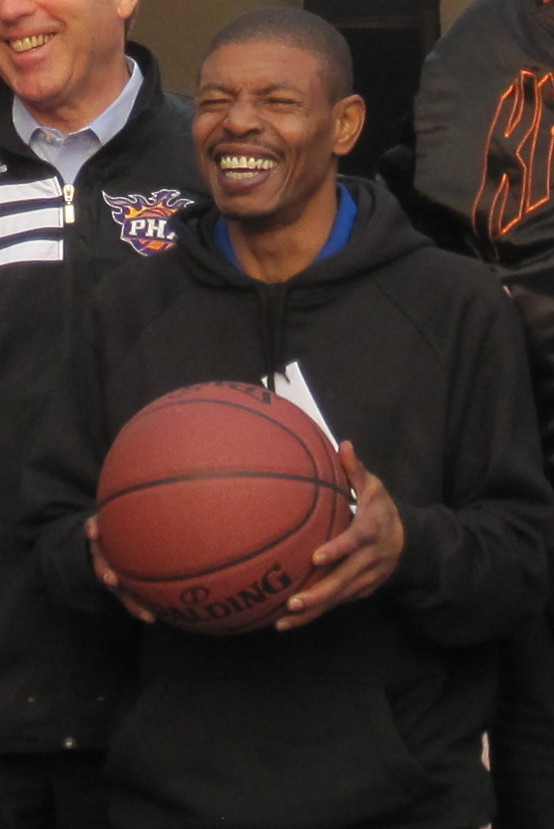
Muggsy Bogues is the Hornets' all-time leader in Assists, Minutes, and Steals.

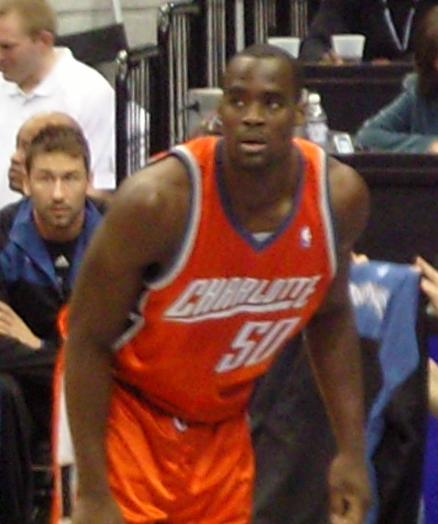
Emeka Okafor won Rookie of the Year honors in 2005 and is the Hornets' all-time leader in Rebounds.

This is a list of the accomplishments and records of the current Charlotte Hornets. The Hornets, known from their creation in 2004 until May 2014 as the Charlotte Bobcats, are an American professional basketball team currently playing in the National Basketball Association (NBA).

The current Hornets are the second NBA team to have played under that name. The original Hornets played in Charlotte from 1988 until moving to New Orleans in 2002; since 2013, they have been known as the New Orleans Pelicans.

== Individual records ==
=== Franchise leaders ===
Italic denotes still active with team.

Asterisk denotes still active but not with team.

(As of beginning of the 2026–27 season)

Points scored (regular season)
Player	Points
Kemba Walker	12,009
Dell Curry	9,839
Miles Bridges*	7,956
Gerald Wallace	7,437
Larry Johnson	7,405
LaMelo Ball*	6,304
Terry Rozier	5,974
Glen Rice	5,651
Muggsy Bogues	5,531
Raymond Felton	5,311
David Wesley	5,241
Gerald Henderson Jr.	4,701
Emeka Okafor	4,630
Alonzo Mourning	4,569
Kendall Gill	4,159
Marvin Williams	4,149
Cody Zeller	4,051
P. J. Washington*	3,946
Michael Kidd-Gilchrist	3,738
Nicolas Batum	3,728

Most minutes played
Player	Minutes
Kemba Walker	20,607
Muggsy Bogues	19,768
Dell Curry	17,613
Gerald Wallace	16,718
Miles Bridges*	15,457
Larry Johnson	14,635
Raymond Felton	13,939
David Wesley	13,046
Marvin Williams	11,615
Emeka Okafor	11,212
Michael Kidd-Gilchrist	10,857
Gerald Henderson Jr.	10,756

Most rebounds
Player	Rebounds
Emeka Okafor	3,516
Larry Johnson	3,479
Gerald Wallace	3,398
Miles Bridges*	3,077
Cody Zeller	2,820
Bismack Biyombo*	2,623
Michael Kidd-Gilchrist	2,388
Anthony Mason	2,354
Kemba Walker	2,317
Marvin Williams	2,293

Most assists
Player	Assists
Muggsy Bogues	5,557
Kemba Walker	3,308
Raymond Felton	2,573
LaMelo Ball*	2,224
David Wesley	1,911
Baron Davis	1,605
Larry Johnson	1,553
Nicolas Batum	1,521
Brevin Knight	1,497
Dell Curry	1,429

Most steals
Player	Steals
Muggsy Bogues	1,067
Gerald Wallace	827
Kemba Walker	799
Dell Curry	747
Raymond Felton	565
David Wesley	551
Baron Davis	439
LaMelo Ball	427
Kendall Gill	398
Miles Bridges*	368

Most blocks
Player	Blocks
Alonzo Mourning	684
Emeka Okafor	621
Bismack Biyombo	607
Gerald Wallace	531
Elden Campbell	484
Miles Bridges*	328
Cody Zeller	315
Michael Kidd-Gilchrist	301
P. J. Washington*	295
Marvin Williams	287

Win Shares (regular season)
Player	Win Shares
Kemba Walker	48.5
Miles Bridges*	27.8
Gerald Wallace	25.5
Alonzo Mourning	22.1
Muggsy Bogues	20.4
LaMelo Ball*	19.8
Dell Curry	17.3
Emeka Okafor	16.0
Glen Rice	15.9
Larry Johnson	14.4

Most three-pointers made
Player	3-pointers made
Kemba Walker	1,283
LaMelo Ball*	977
Dell Curry	929
Miles Bridges*	880
Terry Rozier	864
Marvin Williams	681
P. J. Washington*	537
Brandon Miller	525
Glen Rice	508
Nicolas Batum	496

== Individual Accomplishments and Awards ==
=== All-NBA Team ===
==== Second Team ====
- Larry Johnson – 1993
- Glen Rice – 1997

==== Third Team ====
- Anthony Mason – 1997
- Glen Rice – 1998
- Eddie Jones – 2000
- Al Jefferson – 2014
- Kemba Walker – 2019

=== NBA All-Defensive Team ===
==== First Team ====
- Gerald Wallace – 2010

==== Second Team ====
- Anthony Mason – 1997
- Eddie Jones – 1999, 2000
- P.J. Brown – 2001

=== NBA All-Rookie Team ===
==== First Team ====
- Kendall Gill – 1991
- Larry Johnson – 1992
- Alonzo Mourning – 1993
- Emeka Okafor – 2005
- LaMelo Ball – 2021
- Brandon Miller – 2024
- Kon Knueppel – 2026

==== Second Team ====
- Rex Chapman – 1989
- J.R. Reid – 1990
- Raymond Felton – 2006
- Wálter Herrmann – 2007
- Adam Morrison – 2007
- D. J. Augustin – 2009
- Michael Kidd-Gilchrist – 2013
- Cody Zeller – 2014
- P. J. Washington – 2020

=== Rookie of the Year ===
- Larry Johnson – 1992
- Emeka Okafor – 2005
- LaMelo Ball – 2021

=== Sixth Man of the Year ===
- Dell Curry – 1994

=== Executive of the Year ===
- Bob Bass – 1997

=== NBA Sportsmanship Award ===
- Kemba Walker – 2017, 2018

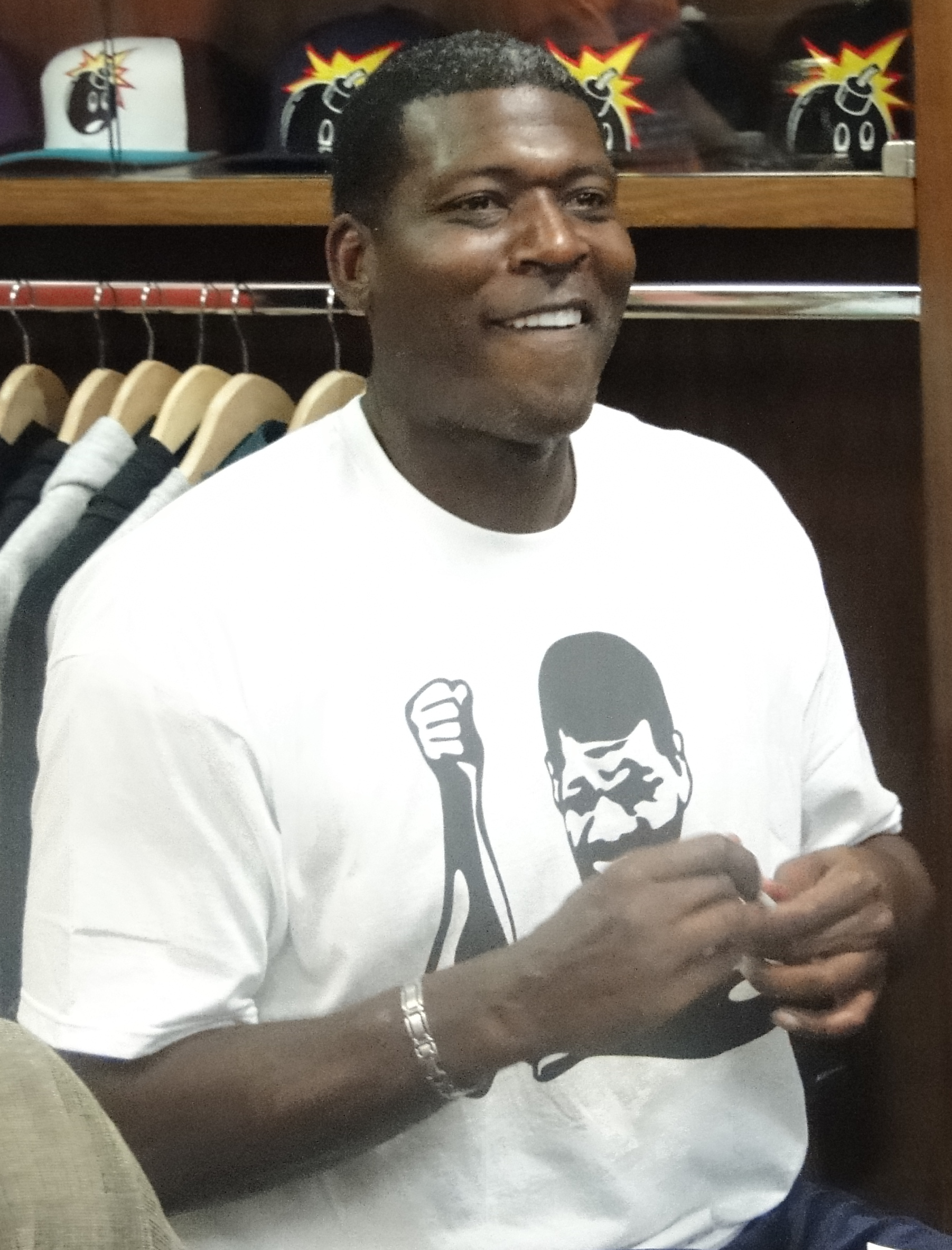
Larry Johnson won Rookie of the Year honors in 1992.

=== All-Stars and All-Star Weekend participants ===
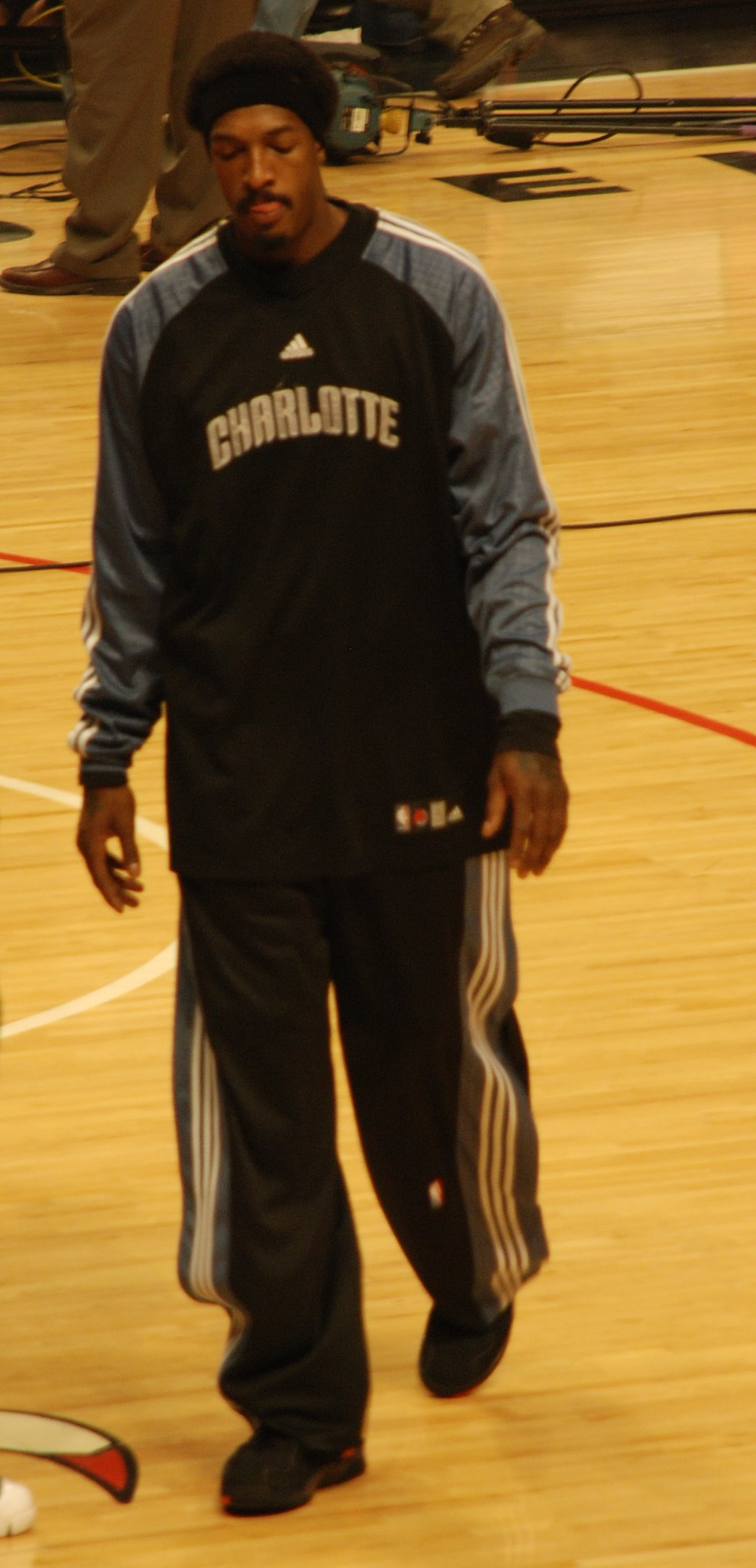
Gerald Wallace was selected to the All-Star and All-Defensive teams in 2010.

NBA All-Star Game Selections

- Larry Johnson – 1993, 1995
- Alonzo Mourning – 1994, 1995
- Glen Rice – 1996, 1997, 1998
- Eddie Jones – 2000
- Baron Davis – 2002
- Gerald Wallace – 2010
- Kemba Walker - 2017, 2018, 2019
- LaMelo Ball - 2022

All-Star Game MVP

- Glen Rice – 1997

Slam Dunk Contest

- Rex Chapman – 1990, 1991
- Kendall Gill – 1991
- Larry Johnson – 1992
- Ricky Davis – 2000
- Baron Davis – 2001
- Gerald Wallace – 2010
- Miles Bridges - 2019

Three-point Shootout

- Dell Curry – 1992, 1994
- Scott Burrell – 1995
- Glen Rice – 1996, 1997, 1998
- Kemba Walker – 2017
- Kon Knueppel – 2026

NBA Rising Stars Challenge

- George Zidek – 1996 (East)
- Baron Davis – 2001 (Sophomores)
- Lee Nailon – 2002 (Sophomores)
- Emeka Okafor – 2005 (Rookies)
- Emeka Okafor – 2006 (Sophomores)
- Adam Morrison – 2007 (Rookies)
- Raymond Felton – 2007 (Sophomores)
- Kemba Walker – 2012 (Team Shaq)
- Michael Kidd-Gilchrist – 2013 (Team Shaq)
- Kemba Walker – 2013 (Team Shaq)
- Cody Zeller – 2015 (Team USA)
- Frank Kaminsky – 2017 (Team USA)
- P. J. Washington – 2020 (Team USA)
- Miles Bridges – 2020 (Team USA)
- Devonte' Graham – 2020 (Team USA)
- LaMelo Ball – 2021 (Team USA)
- LaMelo Ball – 2022 (Sophomores)
- Brandon Miller – 2024 (Rookies)
- Brandon Miller – 2025 (Sophomores)

=== Basketball Hall of Famers ===
Players
No.	Name	Position	Tenure	Inducted
00	Robert Parish	C	1994–96	2003
33	Alonzo Mourning	C/F	1992–95	2014
12	Vlade Divac	C	1996–98	2019

Coaches
Name	Position	Tenure	Inducted
Dave Cowens (Note: Inducted as player.)	Coach	1996–99	1991
Larry Brown (Note: Coached the team when they were known as the Charlotte Bobcats.)	Coach	2008–10	2002

=== FIBA Hall of Famers ===
Players
No.	Name	Position	Tenure	Inducted
12	Vlade Divac	C	1996–98	2010

=== Retired numbers ===
Charlotte Hornets retired numbers
No.	Player	Position	Tenure	Date
13	Bobby Phills	G	1997–2000	February 9, 2000
30	Dell Curry	G	1988–1998	March 19, 2026

- The Charlotte Hornets retired Phills' number on February 9, 2000, after his death in an automobile accident in Charlotte. His jersey hung from the rafters of the Charlotte Coliseum until the franchise relocated in May 2002; it was then displayed in the New Orleans Arena until 2013. On November 1, 2014, Phills' jersey was returned to Charlotte, where it was re-honored and currently hangs in the Spectrum Center.
- The NBA retired Bill Russell's No. 6 for all its member teams on August 11, 2022.
- The Charlotte Hornets retired Dell Curry's number on March 19, 2026.

== Other franchise records ==
=== Team (regular season) ===
- Largest margin of victory in a game – 61 (Score: 140 – 79) Mar. 22, 2018 vs. Memphis
- Largest margin of victory in a playoffs game - 30 (Score: 119 – 89) May 3, 1993 vs. Boston Celtics

in Eastern Conference First Round

- Biggest comeback to win a game (24 points) – 24 Oct 29, 2014 vs. Milwaukee

== See also ==
- NBA records
