= List of NBA regular season team records =

This article lists all-time records achieved in the NBA regular season in major statistical categories recognized by the league, including those set by teams in a game, season, and career. The NBA also recognizes records from its original incarnation, the Basketball Association of America (BAA).

== Team game records ==
Note: Other than the longest game and disqualifications in a game, all records in this section are since the 24-second shot clock was instituted for 1954–55 season onward.

- Largest comeback

- 36 points (:20 left in 2nd) – The Utah Jazz overcame a 36-point deficit to defeat the Denver Nuggets at home on November 27, 1996. Utah trailed 70–34 with 20 seconds left in the 1st half, but outscored Denver 73–33 during the rest of the game to win 107–103. This is the largest overall deficit overcome in NBA history.

- Largest 4th quarter comeback

- 29 points by the Milwaukee Bucks vs. the Atlanta Hawks on November 25, 1977

- Longest game

- 6 overtimes on January 6, 1951 between the Olympians and Royals. Indianapolis beat Rochester 75–73

- Largest margin of victory

- 73 – The Memphis Grizzlies defeated the Oklahoma City Thunder 152–79 on December 2, 2021

- Largest margin of scoring in a half

- 50 – The Dallas Mavericks outscored the Los Angeles Clippers 77–27 in the 1st half on December 27, 2020

- Largest margin of scoring in a quarter

- 36 – The Los Angeles Lakers outscored the Sacramento Kings 40–4 in the 1st quarter on February 4, 1987

- Largest margin of victory in an overtime period

- 17 – The Portland Trail Blazers defeated the Houston Rockets on January 22, 1983 (113–96 game, 17–0 OT)

- Largest margin of victory in a road win

- 57 - The Indiana Pacers (152) vs. the Oklahoma City Thunder (95) on May 1, 2021

- Largest margin of victory in a season-opening game

- 48 - The Portland Trail Blazers (124) vs. The Phoenix Suns (76) on October 18, 2017

=== Points ===
- Most points in a game – overtime

- 186 by the Detroit Pistons vs. the Denver Nuggets on December 13, 1983 (3 OT)

- Most combined points in a game

- 370 – Detroit Pistons (186) at the Denver Nuggets (184) in 3 overtimes on December 13, 1983

- Most points by a team in a game – regulation

- 173 by the Boston Celtics vs. the Minneapolis Lakers on February 27, 1959
- 173 by the Phoenix Suns vs. the Denver Nuggets on November 10, 1990

- Fewest combined points in a game (pre-shot clock)

- 37 combined by the Fort Wayne Pistons (19) and Minneapolis Lakers (18) on November 22, 1950

- Fewest points by a team in a game (post-shot clock)

- 49 by the Chicago Bulls vs. the Miami Heat on April 10, 1999

- Most points by a team in 1st half

- 107 by the Phoenix Suns vs. the Denver Nuggets on November 10, 1990

- Most combined points in 1st half

- 174 – Phoenix Suns (107) vs. the Denver Nuggets (67) on November 10, 1990

- Most points by a team in 2nd half

- 97 by the Atlanta Hawks at the San Diego Rockets on February 11, 1970

- Most combined points in 2nd half

- 172 – San Antonio Spurs (91) at the Denver Nuggets (81) on January 11, 1984

- Fewest points in 1st half (post-shot clock)

- 19 by the Los Angeles Clippers at the Los Angeles Lakers on December 14, 1999

- Fewest points by a team in 2nd half (post-shot clock)

- 16 by the New Orleans Hornets at the Los Angeles Clippers on March 1, 2006

- Most points by a team in one quarter

- 58 by Buffalo Braves in 4th quarter (October 20, 1972)

- Most combined points in a quarter

- 99 – San Antonio Spurs (53) at Denver Nuggets (46) on January 11, 1984

- Fewest points by a team in one quarter

- 2 by Dallas Mavericks in 3rd quarter (4/6/1997)
- 2 by the Golden State Warriors vs. the Toronto Raptors on February 8, 2004

- Most combined points in an overtime period

- 46 – Dallas Mavericks (23) at Houston Rockets (23) on April 11, 1995 (1st OT)

- Fewest combined points in an overtime period

- 2 - Denver (0) vs. Charlotte (2) on January 13, 1997

- Most points by a team in an overtime period

- 25 by the New Jersey Nets on November 30, 1996

- Only team to double its opponent's score in a game

- The Indiana Pacers defeated the Portland Trail Blazers 124–59 on February 27, 1998

- Most fast break points by a team in a game (since stat tracking began in 1997)

- 56 by the Phoenix Suns at the Golden State Warriors on March 15, 2009

- Most paint points by a team in a game since tracking began in 1998

- 98 by the Denver Nuggets on December 15, 2022

- Most consecutive unanswered points in a game

- 31-0 run by the Toronto Raptors vs. the Orlando Magic on March 29, 2026

- Most bench points by a team in a game

- 111 by the Miami Heat vs. the Orlando Magic on April 9, 2023

- Most points scored before a starter scored in a game

- 29 by the Sacramento Kings' bench on November 7, 2017, until Willie Cauley-Stein made a free throw at 4:08 of the 2nd quarter

- Most points scored in a single possession

- 8 by the Trail Blazers vs. the Warriors on February 13, 2019

=== Field goals ===
- Fewest field goals made by a team in a game

- 16 by the Orlando Magic vs. the Boston Celtics on January 23, 2012

- Most consecutive field goals missed by a team in a game

- 24 by the Oklahoma City Thunder vs. the Washington Wizards in February 2017

- Most 3-point field goals missed by a team in a game

- 47 by the Houston Rockets vs. the Brooklyn Nets on January 16, 2019

- Most consecutive 3-point field goals missed by a team in a game

- To Be Determined

- Note: 27 by the Houston Rockets in the 2018 playoffs

- Lowest field goal percentage in a game

- 16.4% by the Philadelphia Warriors vs. the St. Louis Bombers on February 7, 1948

- Lowest field goal percentage in a game (since introduction of 3-pt line)

- 23.4% (18/77) by the Chicago Bulls vs. the Miami Heat on April 10, 1999

- Highest field goal percentage in a game

- 70.7% (53/75) by the San Antonio Spurs vs. the Dallas Mavericks on April 16, 1983

- Most field goals attempted in a game

- 153 by the Philadelphia Warriors vs. the Los Angeles Lakers on December 8, 1961

- Most field goals made in a game

- 74 by the Detroit Pistons vs. the Denver Nuggets on December 13, 1983

- Most combined 3-point field goals made in a game

- 48 by the Golden State Warriors (27) vs. the Dallas Mavericks (21) on December 15, 2024

- Most 3-point field goals attempted by a team in a game

- 70 by the Houston Rockets vs. the Brooklyn Nets on January 16, 2019

- Most 3-point field goals attempted by a team in a game, none made

- 22 by the Denver Nuggets vs. Portland Trail Blazers, December 21, 2012

- Most combined 3-point field goals attempted in a game

- 106 – The Houston Rockets (70) vs. the Brooklyn Nets (36) on January 16, 2019

- Most 3-point field goals made by a team in a game

- 29 by the Milwaukee Bucks vs. the Miami Heat on December 29, 2020
- 29 by the Boston Celtics vs. the New York Knicks on October 22, 2024
- 29 by the Memphis Grizzlies vs. the Cleveland Cavaliers on April 6, 2026
- 29 by the Boston Celtics vs. the New Orleans Pelicans on April 10, 2026

- Most combined 3-point field goals, none missed, in a game

- 5 - San Antonio Spurs (4) at Philadelphia 76ers (1) on December 19, 1984

- Most 3-point field goals by a team, none missed, in a game

- 7 by the Indiana Pacers vs. Atlanta Hawks on January 20, 1995

- Most 3-point field goals made by a team in a half

- 18 by the Utah Jazz vs. the Orlando Magic on April 3, 2021
- 18 by the Milwaukee Bucks vs. the Phoenix Suns on March 17, 2024
- 18 by the Brooklyn Nets vs. the Chicago Bulls on March 29, 2024

- Most 3-point field goals attempted by a team in a half

- 35 by the Houston Rockets vs. the Brooklyn Nets on January 16, 2019

- Highest 3-point percentage in a game with at least 35 three-point attempts

- 62.9% by the Los Angeles Lakers vs. the Memphis Grizzlies on November 14, 2023

=== Free throws ===
- Most free throws made without a miss by a team in a game

- 40 by the Miami Heat on January 10, 2023

- Most free throws made without a miss, collectively by both teams, in a game

- 45 between Atlanta Hawks (29-for-29) and Washington Wizards (16-for-16) on November 1, 2021

- Worst free throw percentage by a team in a game

- 18% (3/17) by the Detroit Pistons vs. the New Orleans Pelicans on March 17, 2017

- Worst combined free throw percentage in a game

- 41% - Los Angeles Lakers (39%) at Chicago (47%) (25 of 61) on December 7, 1968

- Most free throw attempts by a team in a game

- 86 by the Syracuse Nationals vs. the Anderson Packers on November 24, 1949

- Most free throws made by a team in a game

- 61 by the Phoenix Suns vs. the Utah Jazz on April 9, 1990

- Most combined free throws made in a game

- 116 - Syracuse (59) vs. Anderson (57) (5 OT) on November 24, 1949
- 103 - Boston (56) at Minneapolis (47) on November 28, 1954

- Most free throw misses by a team in a game

- 33 by the Philadelphia 76ers vs. the Seattle SuperSonics on December 1, 1967

- Most combined free throw attempts in a game

- 161 - Syracuse Nations (86) vs. Anderson Packers (74) (5 OT) on November 24, 1949

- Fewest free throws made by a team in a game

- 0 by the Toronto Raptors vs. the Charlotte Hornets on January 9, 1996 (0/3)
- 0 by the Boston Celtics vs. Milwaukee Bucks on April 9, 2024 (0/0)

- Fewest combined free throws made in a game

- 1 - Boston Celtics (0) vs. Milwaukee Bucks (1) on April 9, 2024

- Fewest free throw attempts by a team in a game

- 0 by the Boston Celtics vs. the Milwaukee Bucks on April 9, 2024

- Fewest combined free throw attempts in a game

- 2 – Boston Celtics (0) vs. Milwaukee Bucks (2) on April 9, 2024

- Most free throw attempts by a team in a half

- 48 by Chicago vs. Phoenix Suns on January 8, 1970

- Most combined free throw attempts in a half

- 79 - Golden State (43) vs. Sacramento Kings (36) on January 26, 1996

- Most free throws made by a team in a half

- 36 by Chicago vs. Phoenix Suns on January 8, 1970
- 36 by Golden State vs. Utah on March 29, 1990
- 36 by Seattle at Denver on April 7, 1991

- Most combined free throws made in a half

- 62 - Golden State (33) vs. Sacramento Kings (29) on January 26, 1996

- Most combined free throw attempts in one quarter

- 50 - New York (26) at St Louis (24) on December 14, 1957
- 50 - Cincinnati (29) at Baltimore (21) on December 27, 1964

- Most free throw attempts by a team in one quarter

- 32 by Vancouver at Los Angeles Clippers (4th qtr) on November 11, 1997

- Most combined free throws made in one quarter

- 40 - Denver Nuggets (22) vs. Boston Celtics (18) on February 10, 1998

- Most free throws made by a team in one quarter

- 26 by the Atlanta Hawks vs. Milwaukee Bucks on March 3, 1991

=== Rebounds ===
- Most combined rebounds in a game

- 188 by Philadelphia (98) and Los Angeles (90) on December 8, 1961 (3 OT)

- Most combined rebounds in a game

- 109 by the Boston Celtics vs. the Detroit Pistons on December 24, 1960

- Most offensive rebounds by a team in a game

- 38 by the Milwaukee Bucks vs. the Brooklyn Nets on March 20, 2015

- Most combined rebounds in one half

- 65 by the Boston Celtics vs. Cincinnati on January 12, 1962

- Most combined rebounds in one quarter

- 40 by Philadelphia vs. Syracuse on November 9, 1961

- Fewest combined rebounds in a game

- 48 by New York (20) and Fort Wayne (28) on February 14, 1955

- Fewest rebounds by a team in a game

- 17 by the Brooklyn Nets vs. the Oklahoma City Thunder on January 31, 2014

=== Assists ===
- Most combined assists in a game

- 93 by the Detroit Pistons (47) and Denver Nuggets (46) on December 13, 1983 (3 OT)

- Most combined assists in a half

- 51 by the Denver Nuggets (27) and the San Antonio Spurs (24) on November 7, 1990

- Most combined assists in a quarter

- 28 by the Minnesota Timberwolves (15) and the Charlotte Hornets (13) on April 19, 1992

- Most assists by a team in a game

- 53 by the Milwaukee Bucks vs. the Detroit Pistons on December 26, 1978

- Most assists by a team in a half

- 33 by the Phoenix Suns vs. the Denver Nuggets on November 10, 1990

- Most assists by a team in a quarter

- 19 by the Milwaukee Bucks vs. the Detroit Pistons on December 26, 1978
- 19 by the San Antonio Spurs vs. the Denver Nuggets on April 15, 1984 (2nd qtr.)

- Fewest assists by a team in a game

- 3 by the Boston Celtics vs. the Minneapolis Lakers on November 28, 1956
- 3 by the Baltimore Bullets vs. the Boston Celtics on October 16, 1963
- 3 by the Cincinnati Royals vs. the Chicago Bulls on December 5, 1967
- 3 by the New York Knicks vs. the Boston Celtics on March 28, 1976

- Fewest combined assists in a game

- 10 - Boston (3) vs. Minneapolis (7), at Louisville, November 28, 1956
- 18 – The Atlanta Hawks (5) vs. the New York Knicks (13) on April 28, 1999
- 18 – The Denver Nuggets (7) vs. the Miami Heat (11) on February 21, 2004

=== Steals ===
- Most combined steals in a game

- 40 by Golden State (24) and Los Angeles (16) on January 21, 1975
- 40 by Philadelphia (24) and Detroit (16) on November 11, 1978
- 40 by Golden State (25) and San Antonio (15) on February 15, 1989

- Most steals by a team in a game

- 27 by the Seattle SuperSonics vs. the Toronto Raptors on January 15, 1997

- Most steals by a team in a half

- 17 by the Golden State Warriors vs. the San Antonio Spurs on February 15, 1989

- Most steals by a team in a quarter

- 12 by the Golden State Warriors vs. the Indiana Pacers on January 16, 2008

- Fewest combined steals in a game

- 2 – The Detroit Pistons (1) vs. the New York Knicks (1) on October 9, 1973
- 2 – The San Antonio Spurs (1) vs. the Charlotte Hornets (1) on February 6, 1996
- 2 – The Miami Heat (1) vs. the Los Angeles Lakers (1) on January 16, 2006
- 2 – The New York Knicks (0) vs. the New Orleans/Oklahoma City Hornets (2) on February 10, 2006
- 2 – The Orlando Magic (0) vs. the Houston Rockets (2) on January 22, 2011

=== Blocks ===
- Most blocks by a team in a game

- 23 by the Toronto Raptors vs. the Atlanta Hawks on March 23, 2001

- Most blocks by a team in a half

- 16 during the 1st half by the Toronto Raptors vs. the Atlanta Hawks on March 23, 2001
- 16 during the 2nd half by the Toronto Raptors vs. the Golden State Warriors on November 7, 2001

- Most blocks by a team in a quarter

- 9 by the Oklahoma City Thunder on December 23, 2018, and the Orlando Magic on December 23, 2016

- Most combined blocks in a game

- 32 – The Philadelphia 76ers (20) vs. the Seattle SuperSonics (12) on March 9, 1984

=== Turnovers ===
- Most turnovers by a team in a game

- 45 by the San Francisco Warriors vs. the Boston Celtics on March 9, 1971

- Fewest turnovers by a team in a game

- 1 by the Denver Nuggets vs. the Portland Trail Blazers on Feb 23, 2021
- 1 by the Chicago Bulls vs. the Memphis Grizzlies on April 2, 2023

- Most combined turnovers in a game

- 69 – The Phoenix Suns (39) vs. the Denver Nuggets (30) on October 29, 1985

- Fewest combined turnovers in a game

- 9 – The San Antonio Spurs (4) vs. the Los Angeles Clippers (5) on December 13, 2005 (OT)
- 9 – The Cleveland Cavaliers (4) vs. the New Jersey Nets (5) on March 22, 2009

- Most turnovers by a team in a quarter (since tracking began 2016–17)

- 13 by the Phoenix Suns vs. the Golden State Warriors on January 10, 2023 (4th quarter)
- 13 by the Golden State Warriors vs. the Portland Trail Blazers on February 19, 2016 (3rd quarter)

=== Other ===
- Most lead changes in a game

- 43 (plus 11 ties) by the Brooklyn Nets and the Atlanta Hawks on December 6, 2023

- Most combined technical fouls in a quarter

- 7 in the 3rd quarter by the Golden State Warriors and the Phoenix Suns on October 25, 2022

- Most fouls by a team in a game

- 52 by the Utah Jazz vs. the Phoenix Suns on April 9, 1990

- Fewest fouls by a team in a game

- 5 by the Dallas Mavericks at the San Antonio Spurs on November 20, 1999
- 5 by the Orlando Magic at the Philadelphia 76ers on February 4, 2013

- Most disqualifications by a team in a game

- 8 by the Syracuse Nationals vs. the Baltimore Bullets on November 15, 1952 (OT)

- Only team to have five players play at least 50 minutes in a game (shot clock era)

- the Toronto Raptors on January 29, 2022

== Team season records ==
- Best single-season improvement

- The Boston Celtics improved from 24 wins in the 2006–07 season to 66 in the 2007–08 season.

- Best mid-season turnaround

- Miami Heat started 11–30 and finished 30–11 (only team to reach .500 after being 11–30), 2016–17

- Best record, season

- 73–9 (.890) by the Golden State Warriors, 2015–16

- Worst record, season

- 7–59 (.106) by the Charlotte Bobcats, 2011–12

- Most losses, season

- 73 by the Philadelphia 76ers, 1972–73

- Fewest wins, season

- 6 by the Providence Steamrollers, 1947–48

- Longest winning streak

- 33 by the Los Angeles Lakers from November 5, 1971 – January 7, 1972

- Worst start to a season (first 41 games)

- 2–39 by the Dallas Mavericks, 1993–94

- Longest winning streak on the road

- 16 by the Los Angeles Lakers, 1971–72 (during their historic 33-game winning streak)

- Longest winning streak to start out the season

- 24 by the Golden State Warriors, 2015–16. Streak ended on the road vs. the Milwaukee Bucks on December 12, 2015

- Longest winning streak to start out the season while missing the playoffs

- 9 by the Detroit Pistons, 1970–71

- Longest losing streak, season

- 28 by the Detroit Pistons from October 30, 2023 - December 30, 2023

- Longest losing streak at home, season

- 19 by the Dallas Mavericks, 1993–94

- Best home record, season

- 40–1 (.976) by the Boston Celtics, 1985–86
- 40–1 (.976) by the San Antonio Spurs, 2015–16

- Fewest home losses, season

- 1 by the Washington Capitols, 1946–47
- 1 by the Minneapolis Lakers, Syracuse Nationals, and Rochester Royals, 1949–50
- 1 by the Boston Celtics, 1985–86
- 1 by the San Antonio Spurs, 2015–16

- Worst home record, season

- 2–18 (.121) by the Providence Steamrollers, 1947–48

- Fewest home wins, season

- 2 by the Providence Steamrollers, 1947–48

- Most home losses, season

- 35 by the Dallas Mavericks, 1993–94

- Best road record, season

- 34–7 (.829) by the Golden State Warriors, 2015–16

- Most road wins, season

- 34 by the Golden State Warriors, 2015–16

- Fewest road losses, season

- 6 by the Los Angeles Lakers, 2019–20

- Worst road record, season

- 0–20 (.000) by the Baltimore Bullets, 1953–54

- Fewest road wins, season

- 0 by the Baltimore Bullets, 1953–54

- Most road losses, season

- 40 by the Sacramento Kings, 1990–91

- Best record to not qualify for playoffs

- 49–33 (.598) by the Phoenix Suns (8-team playoff of 17-team league), 1971–72

- Worst record of any playoff qualifier

- 16–54 by the Baltimore Bullets, 1952-53

=== Points ===
- Highest average points per game, season

- 126.5 points per game by the Denver Nuggets, 1981–82

- Highest average point differential, season

- +12.87 by the Oklahoma City Thunder, 2024–25

- Lowest average point differential, season

- -15.2 by the Dallas Mavericks, 1992–93

- Most double-digit wins, season

- 50 by the Los Angeles Lakers, 1971–72

- Most points in the paint per game since tracking began 1996–97, season

- 58.5 by the Denver Nuggets, 2024–25

- Fewest points in the paint per game since tracking began 1996–97, season

- 29.6 by the New York Knicks, 2002–03

- Most fast break points per game since tracking began 1996–97, season

- 23.7 by the Golden State Warriors, 2009–10

- Fewest fast break points per game since tracking began 1996–97, season

- 6.3 by the Portland Trail Blazers, 2006–07

- Most second chance points per game since tracking began 1996–97, season

- 18.7 by the Memphis Grizzlies, 2021–22

- Fewest second chance points per game since tracking began 1996–97, season

- 9.5 by the Boston Celtics, 2010–11

- Most points off turnovers per game since tracking began 1996–97, season

- 22.2 by the Boston Celtics, 1997–98

- Fewest points off turnovers per game since tracking began 1996–97, season

- 11.8 by the New York Knicks, 2015–16

- Most opponent points in the paint per game since tracking began 1996–97, season

- 58.4 by the Indiana Pacers and Washington Wizards, 2023–24

- Fewest opponent points in the paint per game since tracking began 1996–97, season

- 28.5 by the New York Knicks, 1998–99 (50 games played)

- Most opponent fast break points per game since tracking began 1996–97, season

- 22.5 by the Toronto Raptors, 1997–98

- Fewest opponent fast break points per game since tracking began 1996–97, season

- 7.3 by the New York Knicks, 2000–01

- Most opponent second chance points per game since tracking began 1996–97, season

- 18.0 by the Toronto Raptors, 1997–98

- Fewest opponent second chance points per game since tracking began 1996–97, season

- 10.1 by the Detroit Pistons, 2016–17

- Most opponent points off turnovers per game since tracking began 1996–97, season

- 21.8 by the Utah Jazz, 2024–25

- Fewest opponent points off turnovers per game since tracking began 1996–97, season

- 11.6 by the Philadelphia 76ers, 2011–12 (66 games played)

=== Field goals ===
- Highest total field goal percentage, season

- 54.5% by the Los Angeles Lakers, 1984–85

- Lowest total field goal percentage, season

- 24.6% by the Detroit Falcons, 1946–47

- Highest 3-point field goal percentage, season

- 42.8% (591 of 1382) by the Charlotte Hornets, 1996–97

- Lowest 3-point field goal percentage, season

- 10.4% by the Los Angeles Lakers, 1982–83

- Most total field goals made, season

- 3,980 by the Denver Nuggets, 1981–82

- Most 3-point field goals made, season

- 1,457 by the Boston Celtics, 2024–25

- Most 3-point field goals made per game, season

- 17.8 by the Boston Celtics, 2024–25

- Fewest 3-point field goal attempts per game, season

- 0.91 by Atlanta Hawks (75 in 82 gms), 1979–80

- Most 3-point field goal attempts per game, season

- 48.2 by the Boston Celtics, 2024–25

- Most 3-point field goal misses, season

- 2,498 by the Boston Celtics, 2024–25

=== Free throws ===
- Highest free-throw percentage, season

- 83.9% by the Los Angeles Clippers, 2020–21

- Lowest free-throw percentage, season

- 59.0% by the Boston Celtics, 1946–47

- Most free throws made, season

- 2,434 made by the Phoenix Suns, 1969–70

- Most free throw attempts per game, season

- 42.4 by the New York Knicks (3056 in 72 gms), 1957–58

- Fewest free throw attempts per game, season

- 20.6 by the Milwaukee Bucks (1687 in 82 gms), 1972–73

- Largest free throw attempt differential per game (since 2014), season

- +8.8 by the Charlotte Hornets, 2017–18

=== Rebounds ===
- Highest average total rebounds per game, season

- 71.5 rebounds per game by the Boston Celtics, 1959–60

- Fewest average total rebounds per game, season

- 35.6 rebounds per game by Cleveland Cavaliers, 1995–96

- Highest average offensive rebounds per game, season

- 18.5 by the Denver Nuggets, 1990–91

- Fewest average offensive rebounds per game, season

- 7.6 by the Dallas Mavericks, 2022–23

=== Assists ===
- Highest average assists per game, season

- 31.4 assists per game by the Los Angeles Lakers, 1984–85

- Fewest average assists per game, season

- 15.6 assists per game by the Atlanta Hawks, 1998–99

=== Steals ===
- Highest average steals per game, season

- 12.9 steals per game by the Phoenix Suns, 1977–78

- Fewest average steals per game, season

- 5.94 steals per game by Detroit Pistons, 1990–91

=== Blocks ===
- Highest average blocks per game, season

- 8.73 blocks per game by the Washington Bullets, 1985–86

- Fewest average blocks per game, season

- 2.37 blocks per game by the Cleveland Cavaliers, 2018–19

=== Other ===
- Highest average turnovers per game, season

- 24.5 turnovers per game (2,011 in 82 gms) by the Denver Nuggets, 1976–77

- Lowest average turnovers per game, season

- 11.1 turnovers per game by the Portland Trail Blazers, 2020–21

- Highest assist-to-turnover ratio since tracking began 1996–97, season

- 2.38 by the Indiana Pacers, 2023–24

- Lowest assist-to-turnover ratio since tracking began 1996–97, season

- 1.01 by the New York Knicks, 2005–06

- Most personal fouls, season

- 30.12 personal fouls per game (2,470 in 82 gms) by the Atlanta Hawks, 1977–78

- Fewest personal fouls, season (min. 82 games played)

- 16.59 personal fouls per game (1,360 in 82 gms) by the Charlotte Hornets, 2016–17

- Only team to hold five consecutive opponents under 70 points (post-shot clock)

- Detroit Pistons, 2003–04

- Only team to never blow a fourth-quarter lead, season

- Los Angeles Lakers never lost when leading after three quarters, going 57-0 (includes playoffs), 2019–20

- Best start to a season

- 24-0 by the Golden State Warriors, 2015-2016

- Only team to win at least 13 straight games after starting the season 0–2

- The Boston Celtics winning streak ended at 16 after losing to the Miami Heat on November 22, 2017 (2017–18)

- Only team to start off a season with three straight losses of at least 20 points each

- The Houston Rockets, 2015–16

- Only team to start out multiple seasons in a row with 0–17 records

- The Philadelphia 76ers, 2014–15 to 2015–16

- Only team to have 28 different players record game minutes during a season

- the Memphis Grizzlies on April 3, 2016

- Most backcourt violations, season

- 13 by the Indiana Pacers, 2016–17

- Most starting lineup combinations, season

- 50 by the Memphis Grizzlies, 2023–24

- Only teams to have three players on NBA All-Defensive First Team

- 1969–70 New York Knicks: Dave DeBusschere, Walt Frazier, Willis Reed
- 1975–76 Boston Celtics: Dave Cowens, John Havlicek, Paul Silas
- 1977–78 Portland Trail Blazers: Lionel Hollins, Maurice Lucas, Bill Walton
- 1982–83 Philadelphia 76ers: Maurice Cheeks, Bobby Jones, Moses Malone
- 1995–96 Chicago Bulls: Michael Jordan, Scottie Pippen, Dennis Rodman

== Team franchise records ==
- Highest winning percentage, all-time

- 59.7% by the Boston Celtics (3,751–2,528)

- Lowest winning percentage, all-time

- 42.1% by the Minnesota Timberwolves (1,245–1,713)

- Most games won, all-time

- 3,751 by the Boston Celtics

- Most games lost, all-time

- 3,359 by the Sacramento Kings

- Most games played, all-time

- 6,278 by the Boston Celtics

- Fewest games played, all-time

- 1,932 by the New Orleans Pelicans

- Longest winning streak at home

- 54 by the Golden State Warriors, 2014-15 to 2015-16 season

- Longest losing streak on the road

- 43 by the Sacramento Kings, 1990–91 to 1991–92

- Most games without consecutive losses

- 146 by the Golden State Warriors, streak ended on March 2, 2017 (began in April 2015)

- Most consecutive seasons with at least 67 wins

- 3 by the Golden State Warriors, 2014-2017 season

- Most consecutive seasons with at least 50 wins

- 18 by the San Antonio Spurs, streak ended on April 3, 2018

- Best overall record during consecutive seasons

- 2 seasons: 141–23 by the Chicago Bulls (1995–96, 1996–97)
- 5 seasons: 322–88 by the Golden State Warriors (2014–15, 2018–19)
- 10 seasons: 570–209 by the Boston Celtics (1957–58, 1966–67)
- 20 seasons: 1133–459 by the San Antonio Spurs (1997–98, 2016–17)

- Youngest starting lineup

- Average age of 20 years, 8 months, 6 days - on April 10, 2021, the Oklahoma City Thunder

=== Field goals ===
- Most 3-point field goals made, all-time

- 26,400 by the Houston Rockets

- Highest 3-point percentage, all-time

- 36.2% by the Golden State Warriors

- Lowest 3-point percentage, all-time

- 34.4% by the Washington Wizards

- Longest streak of at least one 3-point field goal made

- 1,287 games: Phoenix Suns (March 29, 2004–Present)

- Longest streak of at least ten 3-point field goals made

- 17 games: the Houston Rockets, 2016–17

- Worst 3-point field goal percentage in any four-game span (min. 125 attempts)

- 22.3% by the Los Angeles Lakers in first 4 games of the 2022–23 season

- Only team to make more 3-pointers than their opponent had total field goals in a game

- the Boston Celtics vs the Philadelphia 76ers on February 15, 2022

=== Other ===
- Most steals, all-time

- 37,377 steals by the Oklahoma City Thunder

- Most blocks, all-time

- 23,253 by the Los Angeles Lakers

- Only defending champion to start the season 0–6 on the road

- the Golden State Warriors on November 4, 2022

- Most consecutive games with 100-plus team points

- 136 by the Denver Nuggets, 1981-82 season

- Only team to win three straight road games by a margin of at least 30 points in each game

- the Boston Celtics vs. the Philadelphia 76ers on February 15, 2022

- Only team to outscore their opponents by 100 points across their first four games after the All-Star Break

- the New Orleans Pelicans on March 4, 2022

- Worst point differential in 1st quarter over an 8-game span

- -74 by the Los Angeles Lakers, 2023–24

== Other records ==
- Largest attendance at a game

- 68,323 on January 13, 2023, Golden State Warriors at the San Antonio Spurs in the Alamodome. This was a part of the 50th season of the Spurs franchise in San Antonio.

- Most personal fouls per 100 possessions averaged among all teams in an NBA season (league averages)

- 25.8 in 1981–82

- Fewest personal fouls per 100 possessions averaged among all teams in an NBA season (league averages)

- 19.3 in 2020–21

- Most points per game averaged among all teams in an NBA season (league averages)

- 118.8 points per game in 1961–62

== See also ==
- List of NBA regular season individual records
- List of NBA postseason records
- List of NBA All-Star Game records
- List of WNBA regular season records
- Basketball statistics
- List of NFL individual records
- List of NFL team records
- List of NHL records (individual)
- List of NHL records (team)
- List of NBA career scoring leaders
- List of NBA career 3-point scoring leaders
- List of NBA career rebounding leaders
- List of NBA career assists leaders
- List of NBA career steals leaders
- List of NBA career blocks leaders
- List of NBA seasons played leaders
- List of NBA career playoff games played leaders
- List of NBA career playoff turnovers leaders
- List of NBA career playoff 3-point scoring leaders
- List of NBA career playoff triple-double leaders
- List of NBA career playoff steals leaders
- List of NBA career playoff rebounding leaders
- List of NBA annual statistical leaders
- List of NBA annual minutes played leaders
- List of NBA rookie single-season scoring leaders
- List of NBA single-season scoring leaders
- List of NBA single-season rebounding leaders
- List of NBA single-game scoring leaders
- List of NBA single-game rebounding leaders
- List of NBA single-game assists leaders
- List of NBA single-game steals leaders
- List of NBA single-game blocks leaders
- List of NBA longest winning streaks
- List of NBA longest losing streaks
- List of NBA teams by single season win percentage
- List of largest comebacks in NBA games
- List of oldest and youngest National Basketball Association players
- List of tallest players in NBA history
- List of shortest players in NBA history
- List of NBA rivalries
- List of second-generation NBA players
- List of undrafted NBA players
- Timeline of the NBA
- List of NBA arenas
- List of NBA awards
- List of NBA seasons
- List of NBA retired numbers
- List of NBA head coaches with 400 games coached
- List of current NBA head coaches
- List of NBA referees
- List of NBA general managers
- List of NBA team presidents
- List of NBA team owners
- List of NBA mascots
- NBA Cheerleading
- NBA Summer League
- NBA G League
- NBA salary cap
- NBA playoff series
- NBA franchise post-season droughts
- NBA franchise post-season streaks
- NBA champions
- Superteams in the NBA
