= Twyman–Stokes Teammate of the Year =

National Basketball Association award

Twyman-Stokes Teammate of the Year Award
- Sport: Basketball
- League: National Basketball Association (NBA)
- Awarded for: NBA player deemed the best teammate based on selfless play, leadership, and commitment and dedication to team.

History
- First award: 2012–13
- Most recent: DeAndre Jordan (New Orleans Pelicans)

The Twyman–Stokes Teammate of the Year is an annual award in the National Basketball Association (NBA) that recognizes the league's "ideal teammate" who exemplifies "selfless play and commitment and dedication to his team." The award is named after Jack Twyman and Maurice Stokes. The two played together on the Rochester/Cincinnati Royals from 1955 to 1958 until Stokes' career was cut short after he suffered a head injury from a fall during a game against the Minneapolis Lakers. Stokes later became paralyzed due to post-traumatic encephalopathy, a brain injury that damages the motor-control center. Twyman then became Stokes' legal guardian and advocate until Stokes died in 1970.

Every year, 12 players, six from each conference, are nominated by a panel of NBA executives. NBA players then cast votes for the award, with ten points given for each first-place vote, seven for a second-place vote, five points for third, three points for fourth, and one point for each fifth-place vote received. The player with the highest point total, regardless of the number of first-place votes, wins the award. The NBA presents the winner with the Twyman–Stokes Trophy and gives a $25,000 donation to a charity of the recipient's choice.

Los Angeles Clippers guard Chauncey Billups was the inaugural winner of the award in 2013. That year, Miami Heat forward Shane Battier finished second and New York Knicks guard Jason Kidd placed third.

Battier then won the award for the 2013–14 season. Al Jefferson came in second and Dirk Nowitzki finished third, who won in the 2016–17 season and was the only non-American and European awardee.

Tim Duncan won the award for the 2014–15 season. Vince Carter came in second and Elton Brand finished third. After coming in at second the previous year, Carter won the award for the 2015–16 season. Nowitzki is the only international player to win the award. The most recent winner is New Orleans Pelicans center DeAndre Jordan.

== Winners ==
The Twyman-Stokes Teammate of the Year trophy, prior to its redesign for the 2022–23 season

^	Denotes player who is still active in the NBA
*	Elected to the Naismith Memorial Basketball Hall of Fame
Player (#)	Denotes the number of times the player has received the award
Team (#)	Denotes the number of times a player from this team has won

Season	Player	Position	Nationality	Team	Ref
2012–13	Chauncey Billups*	Guard	United States	Los Angeles Clippers	
2013–14	Shane Battier	Forward	United States	Miami Heat	
2014–15	Tim Duncan*	Forward/center	United States	San Antonio Spurs	
2015–16	Vince Carter*	Guard/forward	United States	Memphis Grizzlies	
2016–17	Dirk Nowitzki*	Forward	Germany	Dallas Mavericks	
2017–18	Jamal Crawford	Guard/forward	United States	Minnesota Timberwolves	
2018–19	Mike Conley^	Guard	United States	Memphis Grizzlies (2)	
2019–20	Jrue Holiday^	Guard	United States	New Orleans Pelicans	
2020–21	Damian Lillard^	Guard	United States	Portland Trail Blazers	
2021–22	Jrue Holiday^ (2)	Guard	United States	Milwaukee Bucks	
2022–23	Jrue Holiday^ (3)	Guard	United States	Milwaukee Bucks (2)	
2023–24	Mike Conley^ (2)	Guard	United States	Minnesota Timberwolves (2)	
2024–25	Stephen Curry^	Guard	United States	Golden State Warriors	
2025–26	DeAndre Jordan^	Center	United States	New Orleans Pelicans (2)	

== Multi-time winners ==
Awards	Player	Team	Years
3	(United States) Jrue Holiday	New Orleans Pelicans, Milwaukee Bucks (2)	2020, 2022, 2023
2	(United States) Mike Conley	Memphis Grizzlies, Minnesota Timberwolves	2019, 2024

== See also ==
- NBA records

== External sources ==
- "Sports Trophies – Twyman-Stokes Teammate of the Year Award – Marc Mellon Sculpture Studio". 12 January 2022.
