= Chicago Bulls accomplishments and records =

This page details the all-time statistics, records, and other achievements pertaining to the Chicago Bulls.

== Individual awards ==
NBA Most Valuable Player

- Michael Jordan – 1988, 1991, 1992, 1996, 1998
- Derrick Rose – 2011

NBA Defensive Player of the Year

- Michael Jordan – 1988
- Joakim Noah – 2014

NBA Rookie of the Year

- Michael Jordan – 1985
- Elton Brand – 2000 (Co-Rookie of the Year)
- Derrick Rose – 2009

NBA Sixth Man of the Year

- Toni Kukoč – 1996
- Ben Gordon – 2005

NBA Most Improved Player Award

- Jimmy Butler – 2015

NBA Hustle Award

- Thaddeus Young – 2021
- Alex Caruso – 2024

NBA Finals MVP

- Michael Jordan – 1991–1993, 1996–1998

Best NBA Player ESPY Award

- Michael Jordan – 1993, 1997–1999

NBA Sportsmanship Award

- Luol Deng – 2007

J. Walter Kennedy Citizenship Award

- Joakim Noah – 2015

NBA Coach of the Year

- Johnny "Red" Kerr – 1967
- Dick Motta – 1971
- Phil Jackson – 1996
- Tom Thibodeau – 2011

NBA Executive of the Year

- Jerry Krause – 1988, 1996
- Gar Forman – 2011 (Co-Executive of the Year)

NBA Scoring Champion

- Michael Jordan – 1987–1993, 1996–1998

All-NBA First Team

- Michael Jordan – 1987–1993, 1996–1998
- Scottie Pippen – 1994–1996
- Derrick Rose – 2011
- Joakim Noah – 2014

All-NBA Second Team

- Bob Love – 1971, 1972
- Norm Van Lier – 1974
- Michael Jordan – 1985
- Scottie Pippen – 1992, 1997
- Pau Gasol – 2015
- DeMar DeRozan – 2022

All-NBA Third Team

- Scottie Pippen – 1993, 1998
- Jimmy Butler – 2017

NBA All-Defensive First Team

- Jerry Sloan – 1969, 1972, 1974, 1975
- Norm Van Lier – 1974, 1976, 1977
- Michael Jordan – 1988–1993, 1996–1998
- Scottie Pippen – 1992–1998
- Dennis Rodman – 1996
- Joakim Noah – 2013, 2014
- Alex Caruso – 2023

NBA All-Defensive Second Team

- Jerry Sloan – 1970, 1971
- Norm Van Lier – 1972, 1973, 1975, 1978
- Bob Love – 1972, 1974, 1975
- Artis Gilmore – 1978
- Scottie Pippen – 1991
- Horace Grant – 1993, 1994
- Kirk Hinrich – 2007
- Ben Wallace – 2007
- Joakim Noah – 2011
- Luol Deng – 2012
- Jimmy Butler – 2014, 2016
- Alex Caruso – 2024

NBA All-Rookie First Team

- Erwin Mueller – 1967
- Clifford Ray – 1972
- Scott May – 1977
- Reggie Theus – 1979
- David Greenwood – 1980
- Quintin Dailey – 1983
- Michael Jordan – 1985
- Charles Oakley – 1986
- Elton Brand – 2000
- Kirk Hinrich – 2004
- Luol Deng – 2005
- Ben Gordon – 2005
- Derrick Rose – 2009
- Taj Gibson – 2010
- Nikola Mirotić – 2015
- Lauri Markkanen – 2018

NBA All-Rookie Second Team

- Stacey King – 1990
- Toni Kukoč – 1994
- Ron Artest – 2000
- Marcus Fizer – 2001
- Jay Williams – 2003
- Tyrus Thomas – 2007
- Coby White – 2020
- Patrick Williams – 2021
- Ayo Dosunmu – 2022
- Matas Buzelis – 2025
- Hold the record for the fewest points per game in a season after 1954–55 (81.9 in 1998–99)
- Hold the record for the fewest points in a game after 1954–55 (49, April 10, 1999)
- Hold the record for largest margin of victory in an NBA Finals game (42; defeated the Utah Jazz 96–54)
- Hold the record for fewest points allowed in an NBA Finals game (54 against the Utah Jazz)
- Share lowest free throw percentage by two teams in one game (.410 with the Los Angeles Lakers, February 7, 1968)
- Share record for most personal fouls by two teams in one game (87 with the Portland Trail Blazers, March 16, 1984)
- Shared record: Will Perdue for fewest minutes played by a disqualified player in a playoff game (7 against the New York Knicks, May 14, 1992)
- Dennis Rodman, most offensive rebounds in an NBA Finals game (11 twice against the Seattle SuperSonics in the 1996 NBA Finals)
- Shared record: Two teams with the fewest players to score more than ten points in a playoff game (4 with the Miami Heat, May 24, 1997)
- Highest defensive rebound percentage in a playoff game (.952 against the Golden State Warriors on April 30, 1975)
- Shared record: Highest free throw percentage by one team in a playoff game (1.000 against the Cleveland Cavaliers on May 19, 1992)
- After the San Antonio Spurs lost the 2013 NBA Finals to the Miami Heat in seven games, the Bulls are currently the only NBA franchise to have won multiple NBA championships without a championship series loss.

=== NBA All-Star Weekend ===
NBA All-Star Selections

- Guy Rodgers – 1967
- Jerry Sloan – 1967, 1969
- Bob Boozer – 1968
- Chet Walker – 1970, 1971, 1973, 1974
- Bob Love – 1971–1973
- Norm Van Lier – 1974, 1976, 1977
- Artis Gilmore – 1978, 1979, 1981, 1982
- Reggie Theus – 1981, 1983
- Michael Jordan – 1985–1993, 1996–1998
- Scottie Pippen – 1990, 1992–1997
- B. J. Armstrong – 1994
- Horace Grant – 1994
- Derrick Rose – 2010–2012
- Luol Deng – 2012, 2013
- Joakim Noah – 2013, 2014
- Pau Gasol – 2015, 2016
- Jimmy Butler – 2015–2017
- Zach LaVine – 2021, 2022
- DeMar DeRozan – 2022, 2023

NBA All-Star head coach

- Phil Jackson – 1992, 1996
- Tom Thibodeau – 2012

NBA All-Star Game MVP

- Michael Jordan – 1988, 1996, 1998
- Scottie Pippen – 1994

NBA All-Star Weekend Skills Challenge

- Derrick Rose – 2009, 2011
- Lauri Markkanen – 2018

NBA All-Star Weekend Three-Point Shootout

- Kyle Macy - 1986
- Craig Hodges – 1989–1993
- Michael Jordan- 1990
- B. J. Armstrong- 1993, 1994
- Steve Kerr – 1994–1997
- Zach LaVine - 2020–2022

NBA All-Star Weekend Slam Dunk Contest

- Orlando Woolridge - 1984, 1985
- Michael Jordan – 1985, 1987, 1988
- Scottie Pippen - 1990
- Tyrus Thomas - 2007
- Matas Buzelis – 2025

== Season records ==
Most successful
Season	Wins	Losses	Win%
1995–96	72	10	.878
1996–97	69	13	.841
1991–92	67	15	.817
2011–12 (Note: Due to a lockout, the season did not start until December 25, 2011 and all 30 teams played a shortened 66 game regular season schedule.)	50	16	.758
1997–98	62	20	.756
2010–11	62	20	.756
1990–91	61	21	.744
1992–93	57	25	.695
1971–72	57	25	.695
1993–94	55	27	.671

Least successful
Season	Wins	Losses	Win%
2000–01	15	67	.183
1999–00	17	65	.207
2001–02	21	61	.256
1998–99 (Note: Due to a lockout, the season did not start until February 5, 1999, and all 29 teams played a shortened 50 game regular season schedule.)	13	37	.260
2018–19	22	60	.268
2003–04	23	59	.280
1975–76	24	58	.293
2017–18	27	55	.329
1983–84	27	55	.329
1982–83	28	54	.341

== Franchise records ==
(Correct as of the end of the 2025–26 season )
Bold denotes still active with team.
Italic denotes still active, but not with team.

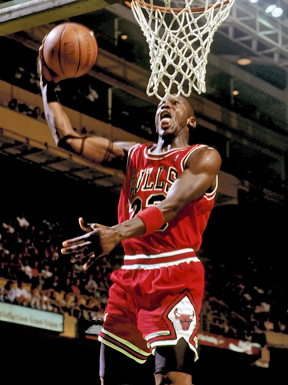
Michael Jordan was the face of the Bulls from 1984 to 1993 then again from 1995 to 1998.

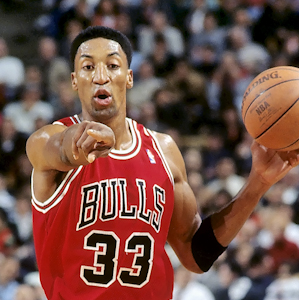
Scottie Pippen was a face of the Bulls from 1987 to 1998 and returned for a final stint from 2003 to 2004.

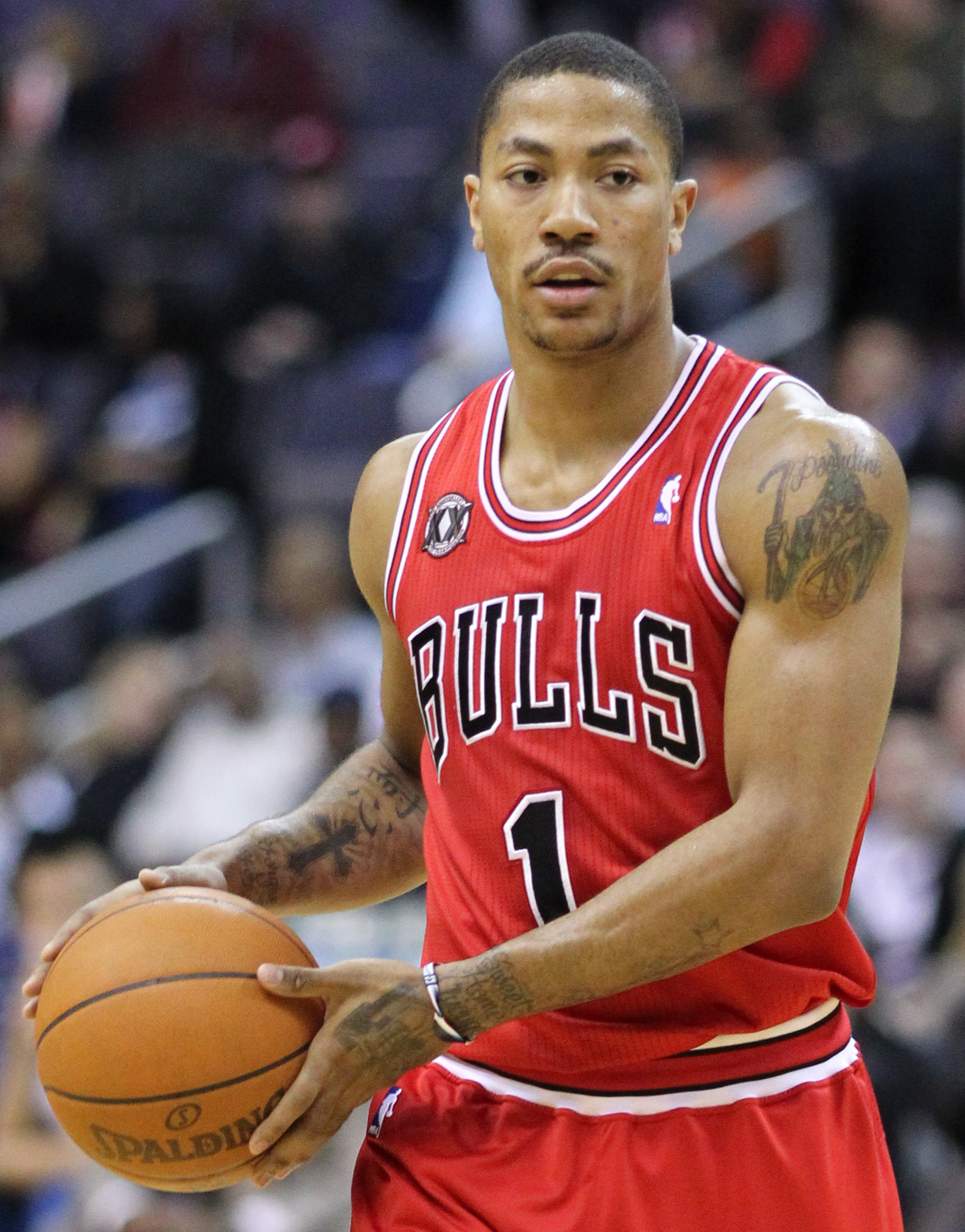
Derrick Rose became the face of the Bulls in 2008 and lasted till 2016.

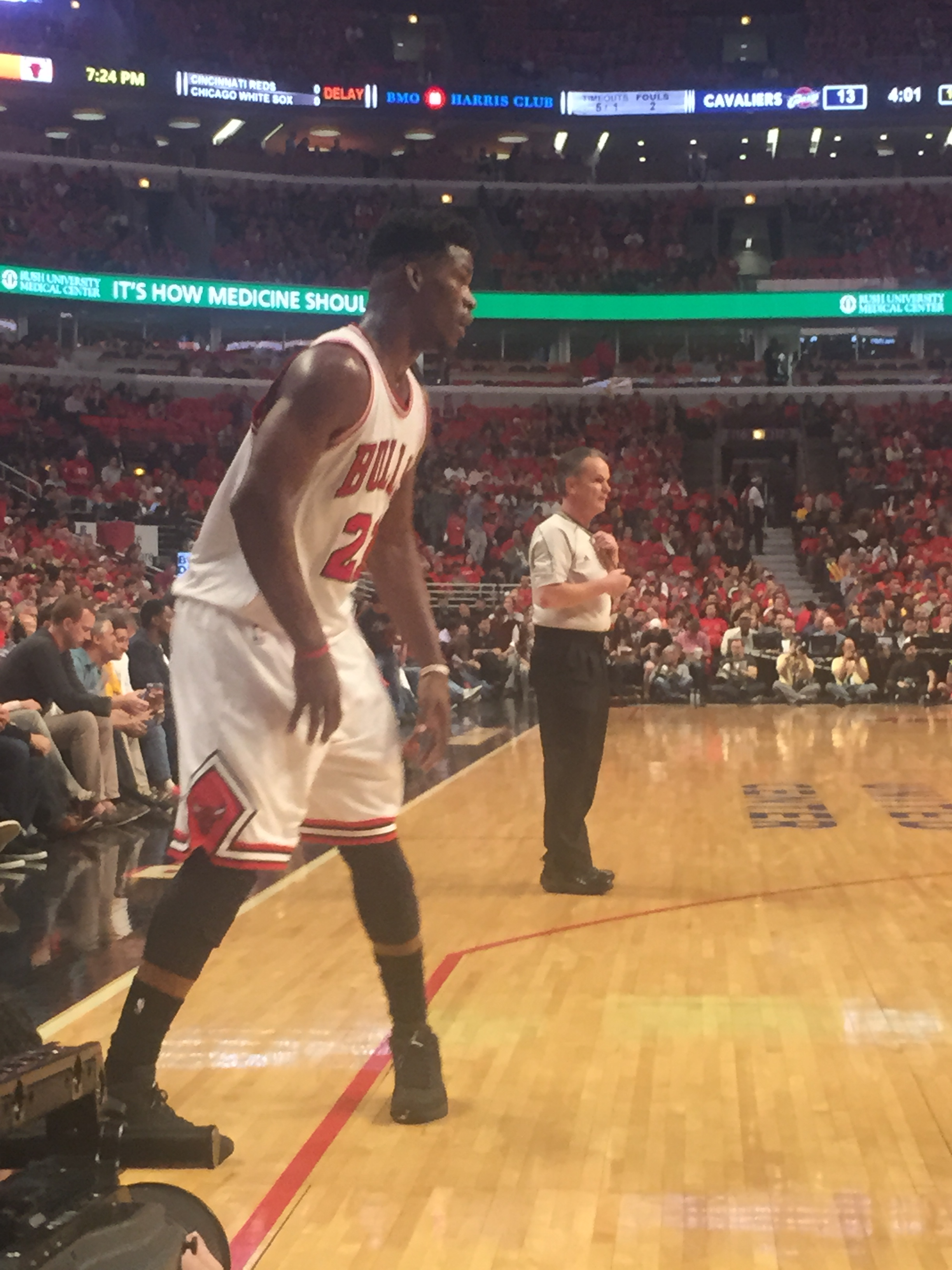
Jimmy Butler was drafted by the Bulls in 2011.

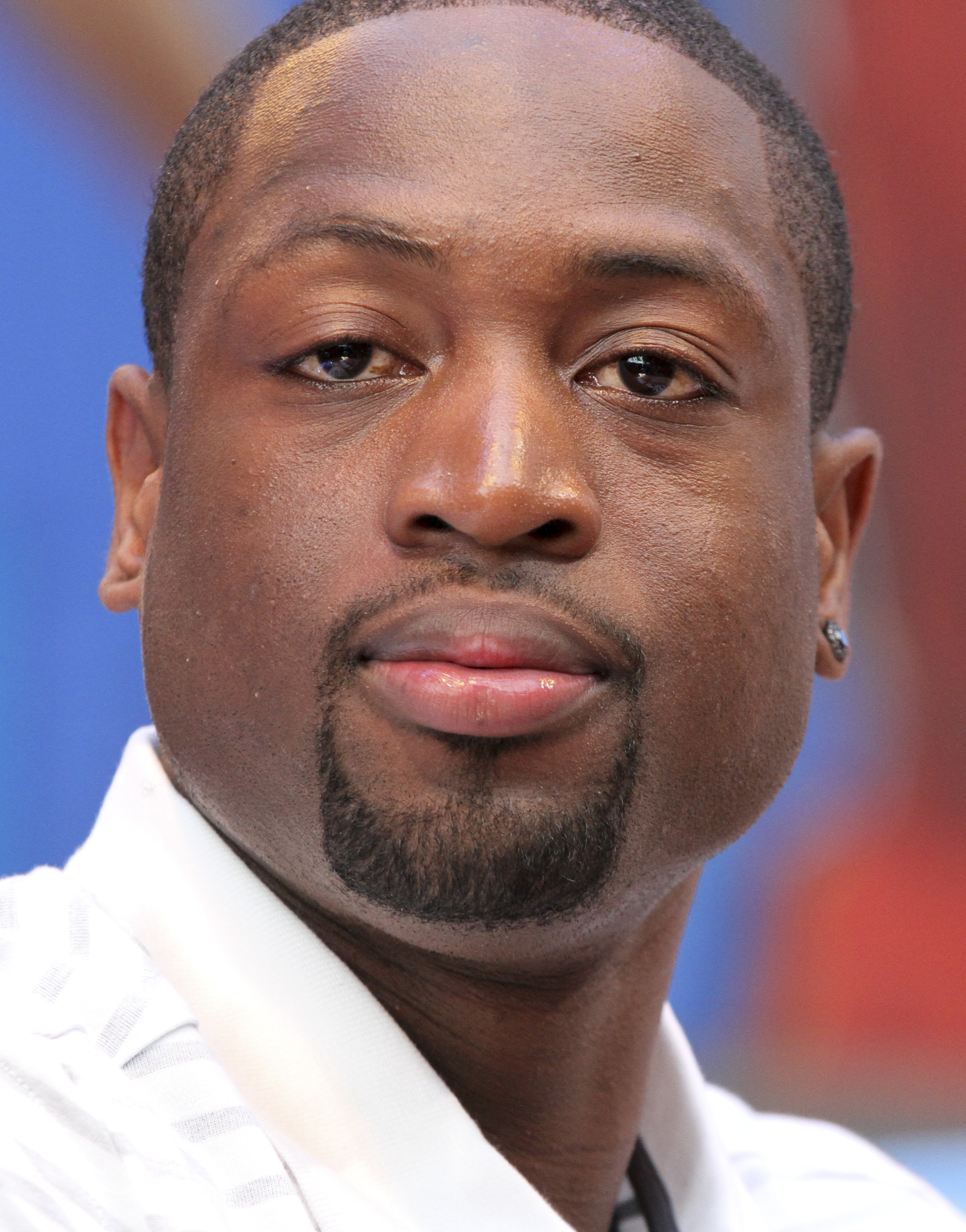
Dwyane Wade signed with the Bulls in 2016.

Most games played
Player	Games
Michael Jordan	930
Scottie Pippen	856
Kirk Hinrich	748
Jerry Sloan	696
John Paxson	645
Luol Deng	637
Tom Boerwinkle	635
Bob Love	592
Joakim Noah	572
Taj Gibson	562

Most points scored
Player	Points
Michael Jordan	29,277
Scottie Pippen	15,123
Bob Love	12,623
Luol Deng	10,286
Jerry Sloan	10,233
Zach LaVine	10,056
Chet Walker	9,788
Artis Gilmore	9,288
Kirk Hinrich	8,536
Reggie Theus	8,279

Most points scored in a game (Correct as of October 26, 2024)
≥60 point games
Player	Points	Opponent	Dates
Michael Jordan	69	Cleveland Cavaliers	March 28, 1990
Michael Jordan	64	Orlando Magic	January 16, 1993
Michael Jordan	61	Detroit Pistons	March 4, 1987
Michael Jordan	61	Atlanta Hawks	April 16, 1987
59 point games
Michael Jordan	59	Detroit Pistons	April 3, 1988
58 point games
Michael Jordan	58	New Jersey Nets	February 26, 1987
57 point games
Michael Jordan	57	Washington Bullets	December 23, 1992
56 point games
Chet Walker	56	Cincinnati Royals	February 6, 1972
Michael Jordan	56	Philadelphia 76ers	March 24, 1987
55 point games
Michael Jordan	55	New York Knicks	March 28, 1995
54 point games
Michael Jordan	54	Cleveland Cavaliers	November 3, 1989
Michael Jordan	54	Los Angeles Lakers	November 20, 1992
53 point games
Michael Jordan	53	Portland Trail Blazers	January 8, 1987
Michael Jordan	53	Indiana Pacers	April 12, 1987
Michael Jordan	53	Phoenix Suns	January 21, 1989
Michael Jordan	53	Detroit Pistons	March 7, 1996
Jimmy Butler	53	Philadelphia 76ers	January 14, 2016
Other 50+ point performances
Michael Jordan	52	Cleveland Cavaliers	December 17, 1987
Michael Jordan	52	Portland Trail Blazers	February 26, 1988
Michael Jordan	52	Boston Celtics	November 9, 1988
Michael Jordan	52	Philadelphia 76ers	November 16, 1988
Michael Jordan	52	Denver Nuggets	November 26, 1988
Michael Jordan	52	Orlando Magic	December 20, 1989
Michael Jordan	52	Charlotte Hornets	March 12, 1993
Jimmy Butler	52	Charlotte Hornets	January 2, 2017
Michael Jordan	51	Washington Wizards	March 19, 1992
Michael Jordan	51	New York Knicks	January 21, 1997
Zach LaVine	51	Detroit Pistons	October 29, 2023
Jamal Crawford	50	Toronto Raptors	April 11, 2004
DeMar DeRozan	50	Los Angeles Clippers	March 31, 2022
Zach LaVine	50	Atlanta Hawks	April 9, 2021
Michael Jordan	50	New York Knicks	November 1, 1986
Michael Jordan	50	Milwaukee Bucks	April 13, 1987
Michael Jordan	50	Boston Celtics	March 18, 1988
Michael Jordan	50	Cleveland Cavaliers	April 28, 1988
Michael Jordan	50	Milwaukee Bucks	February 16, 1989
Michael Jordan	50	Cleveland Cavaliers	May 5, 1989
Michael Jordan	50	Denver Nuggets	March 24, 1992
Michael Jordan	50	Miami Heat	November 6, 1996

Most minutes played
Player	Minutes
Michael Jordan	35,887
Scottie Pippen	30,269
Jerry Sloan	24,798
Kirk Hinrich	23,545
Luol Deng	22,882
Bob Love	22,073
Norm Van Lier	19,122
Horace Grant	18,204
Joakim Noah	16,848
Artis Gilmore	16,777

Most rebounds
Player	Rebounds
Michael Jordan	5,836
Tom Boerwinkle	5,745
Scottie Pippen	5,726
Joakim Noah	5,387
Jerry Sloan	5,385
Artis Gilmore	5,342
Horace Grant	4,721
Dave Greenwood	4,222
Luol Deng	4,078
Bob Love	3,998

Most assists
Player	Assists
Michael Jordan	5,012
Scottie Pippen	4,494
Kirk Hinrich	3,811
Norm Van Lier	3,676
Derrick Rose	2,516
Reggie Theus	2,472
John Paxson	2,394
Bob Weiss	2,008
Tom Boerwinkle	2007
Toni Kukoč	1,840

Most steals
Player	Steals
Michael Jordan	2,306
Scottie Pippen	1,792
Kirk Hinrich	857
Norm Van Lier	724
Luol Deng	639
Horace Grant	587
Jimmy Butler	583
Reggie Theus	580
Joakim Noah	481
Toni Kukoč	476

Most blocks
Player	Blocks
Artis Gilmore	1,029
Michael Jordan	828
Joakim Noah	803
Scottie Pippen	774
Taj Gibson	695
Horace Grant	579
Dave Corzine	573
Dave Greenwood	526
Tyson Chandler	487
Luol Deng	360

Most field goals made
Player	Field goals
Michael Jordan	10,962
Scottie Pippen	5,991
Bob Love	4,948
Jerry Sloan	3,996
Luol Deng	3,987
Chet Walker	3,558
Zach LaVine	3,545
Artis Gilmore	3,466
Derrick Rose	3,102
Kirk Hinrich	3,101

Most three-point field goals made
Player	Three's Made
Zach LaVine	1,130
Coby White	1,057
Kirk Hinrich	1,049
Ben Gordon	770
Scottie Pippen	664
Nikola Vucevic	556
Michael Jordan	555
Lauri Markkanen	493
**Patrick Williams**	434
Nikola Mirotić	432

Most free throws made
Player	Free Throws
Michael Jordan	6,798
Bob Love	2,727
Chet Walker	2,672
Scottie Pippen	2,477
Artis Gilmore	2,355
Jerry Sloan	2,241
Reggie Theus	2,090
Luol Deng	1,925
Jimmy Butler	1,856
Zach LaVine	1,836

== Franchise record for wins ==
Regular Season Wins
Wins	Season
Most Wins
72	1995–96
Most Home Wins
39	1995–96
Most Road Wins
33	1995–96
Playoffs Wins
Most Wins in the Playoffs
15	1995–96
Most Wins in a Playoff Series
4	1990–91, 1991–92, 1992–93, 1995–96, 1996–97, 1997–98

== Franchise record for championships ==
Championships
Championships	Seasons
NBA Championships
6	1991, 1992, 1993, 1996, 1997, 1998
Conference Championships
6	1991, 1992, 1993, 1996, 1997, 1998
Division Championships
9	1975, 1991, 1992, 1993, 1996, 1997, 1998, 2011, 2012

== NBA records ==
=== Individual ===
==== Regular season ====
Regular season game
Category	Player	Opponent	Date	Total
3PFGM, Quarter, Rookie	Coby White	New York Knicks	November 12, 2019	7
3PFGM, Game, No misses	Ben Gordon	Washington Wizards	April 14, 2006	9
FTM, Half	Michael Jordan	Miami Heat	December 30, 1992	20
FTA, Half	Michael Jordan	Miami Heat	December 30, 1992	23
STL, Half	Michael Jordan	Boston Celtics	November 9, 1988	8

==== Playoffs ====
Playoffs game
Category	Player	Opponent	Date	Total
Most PTS, Game	Michael Jordan	Boston Celtics	April 20, 1986	63 (Note: The game was played in 2OT.)
Most FGM, Game	Michael Jordan	Cleveland Cavaliers	May 1, 1988	24
Most FGA, Half	Michael Jordan	Cleveland Cavaliers	May 1, 1988	25
Most consecutive FGM, Game	Michael Jordan	Los Angeles Lakers	June 5, 1991	13
Most FTM, Quarter	Michael Jordan	Detroit Pistons	May 21, 1991	13

==== NBA Finals ====
NBA Finals game
Category	Player	Opponent	Date	Total
Most FGM, Half	Michael Jordan	Portland Trail Blazers	June 3, 1992	14
Most FGM, Half	Michael Jordan	Phoenix Suns	June 16, 1993	14
Most consecutive FGM	Michael Jordan	Los Angeles Lakers	June 5, 1991	13
Most FTM, Quarter	Michael Jordan	Utah Jazz	June 11, 1997	9
Most offensive REB, Game	Dennis Rodman	Seattle SuperSonics	June 7, 1996	11
Most offensive REB, Game	Dennis Rodman	Seattle SuperSonics	June 16, 1996	11

NBA Finals series
Category	Player	Opponent	Year	Total
Most PTS per game	Michael Jordan	Phoenix Suns	1993	41.0
Most STL (5-game series)	Michael Jordan	Los Angeles Lakers	1991	14
Most PTS (6-game series)	Michael Jordan	Phoenix Suns	1993	246
Most FGM (6-game series)	Michael Jordan	Phoenix Suns	1993	101

==== Miscellaneous ====
- Leading the league in scoring, oldest, 35 years, 61 days, Michael Jordan, April 19, 1998
- Leading the league in rebounding, oldest, 36 years, 341 days, Dennis Rodman, April 19, 1998

=== Team ===
==== Regular season ====
Regular season game
Category	Opponent	Date	Total
Fewest PTS, game	Miami Heat	April 10, 1999	49

- Teams that had two players score 40+ points in a game, Michael Jordan 44, Scottie Pippen 40, February 18, 1996.
- Best start (41 games), 38–3, 1995–96.
- Fewest points per game, 81.9, 1998–99.
- Undefeated months, 14–0, January 1996.

==== Playoffs ====
- Best home record, 39–7.

==== NBA Finals ====
- Best NBA Finals series record, 6–0.
- Largest margin of victory in a game, 42, June 7, 1998. The Bulls went 6-0 and swept each team they faced in their final games.

== See also ==
- NBA records
