= 2020–21 Chicago Bulls season =

Season of National Basketball Association team the Chicago Bulls

- Head coach: Billy Donovan
- President: Michael Reinsdorf
- General manager: Marc Eversley
- Owner: Jerry Reinsdorf
- Arena: United Center

Results
- Record: 31–41 (.431)
- Place: Division: 3rd (Central); Conference: 11th (Eastern)
- Playoff finish: Did not qualify
- Stats at Basketball Reference

Local media
- Television: NBC Sports Chicago
- Radio: WLS; WSCR

The 2020–21 Chicago Bulls season was the 55th season of the franchise in the National Basketball Association (NBA). On April 13, 2020, Arturas Karnišovas was named executive vice-president of basketball operations by the Bulls. The Bulls replaced Jim Boylen, with former Oklahoma City Thunder coach Billy Donovan on September 22. The Bulls entered the season with the fourth overall pick that would be used to draft Patrick Williams.

The Bulls missed the playoffs after finishing the season with a 31–41 record and placing 11th in the East.

== Draft picks ==
Round	Pick	Player	Position	Nationality	College / Club
1	4	Patrick Williams	Small forward	United States	Florida State
2	44	Marko Simonović	Power forward / Center	Montenegro	Mega Soccerbet (Serbia)

Before the start of the 2020 NBA draft period, the Bulls' selection was originally held stuck at the #7 selection before the NBA suspended their season on March 12, 2020, and cancelled the rest of Chicago's season by June 5. Chicago had the second-best record of teams that had their seasons cancelled during that period. On the night of the 2020 NBA draft lottery, the Bulls moved up three spots from the seventh selection to the fourth pick of the draft. The Bulls also have a second-round selection at #44, but that selection was acquired from the Memphis Grizzlies after their own second-round pick was traded to the Washington Wizards.

== Roster ==
2020–21 Chicago Bulls roster
Players

Pos.	No.	Player	Height	Weight	DOB	From
F	5	Al-Farouq Aminu	6 ft 9 in (2.06 m)	220 lb (100 kg)	1990-09-21	Wake Forest
G	51	Ryan Arcidiacono	6 ft 3 in (1.91 m)	195 lb (88 kg)	1994-03-26	Villanova
G/F	7	Troy Brown	6 ft 7 in (2.01 m)	215 lb (98 kg)	1999-07-28	Oregon
G	3	Devon Dotson (TW)	6 ft 2 in (1.88 m)	185 lb (84 kg)	1999-08-02	Kansas
C	6	Cristiano Felício	6 ft 11 in (2.11 m)	270 lb (122 kg)	1992-07-07	CCSE Prep Academy (CA)
G	11	Javonte Green	6 ft 4 in (1.93 m)	205 lb (93 kg)	1993-07-23	Radford
G	8	Zach LaVine	6 ft 5 in (1.96 m)	200 lb (91 kg)	1995-03-10	UCLA
F	24	Lauri Markkanen	7 ft 0 in (2.13 m)	240 lb (109 kg)	1997-05-22	Arizona
G	20	Adam Mokoka (TW)	6 ft 5 in (1.96 m)	190 lb (86 kg)	1998-07-18	France
G	31	Tomáš Satoranský	6 ft 7 in (2.01 m)	210 lb (95 kg)	1991-10-30	Czech Republic
G	17	Garrett Temple	6 ft 5 in (1.96 m)	195 lb (88 kg)	1986-05-08	LSU
F/C	27	Daniel Theis	6 ft 8 in (2.03 m)	245 lb (111 kg)	1992-04-04	Germany
G	45	Denzel Valentine	6 ft 4 in (1.93 m)	220 lb (100 kg)	1993-11-16	Michigan State
C	9	Nikola Vučević	7 ft 0 in (2.13 m)	260 lb (118 kg)	1990-10-24	USC
G	0	Coby White	6 ft 5 in (1.96 m)	195 lb (88 kg)	2000-02-16	North Carolina
F	44	Patrick Williams	6 ft 7 in (2.01 m)	215 lb (98 kg)	2001-08-26	Florida State
F	21	Thaddeus Young	6 ft 8 in (2.03 m)	235 lb (107 kg)	1988-06-21	Georgia Tech

Coaches
Head coach
- Billy Donovan
Assistant(s)
- John Bryant
- Maurice Cheeks
- Damian Cotter
- Chris Fleming
- Josh Longstaff
- Billy Schmidt
- Todd Campbell (trainer)

Legend
- (DP) Unsigned draft pick
- (FA) Free agent
- (S) Suspended
- (GL) On assignment to G League affiliate
- (TW) Two-way affiliate player
- Injured

Roster
Updated: March 25, 2021

== Standings ==
=== Division ===
Central Division	W	L	PCT	GB	Home	Road	Div	GP
y – Milwaukee Bucks	46	26	.639	–	26‍–‍10	20‍–‍16	11–1	72
pi – Indiana Pacers	34	38	.472	12.0	13‍–‍23	21‍–‍15	7–5	72
Chicago Bulls	31	41	.431	15.0	15‍–‍21	16‍–‍20	7–5	72
Cleveland Cavaliers	22	50	.306	24.0	13‍–‍23	9‍–‍27	4–8	72
Detroit Pistons	20	52	.278	26.0	13‍–‍23	7‍–‍29	1–11	72

=== Conference ===
Eastern Conference
#	Team	W	L	PCT	GB	GP
1	c − Philadelphia 76ers *	49	23	.681	–	72
2	x – Brooklyn Nets	48	24	.667	1.0	72
3	y – Milwaukee Bucks *	46	26	.639	3.0	72
4	x – New York Knicks	41	31	.569	8.0	72
5	y – Atlanta Hawks *	41	31	.569	8.0	72
6	x – Miami Heat	40	32	.556	9.0	72
7	x – Boston Celtics	36	36	.500	13.0	72
8	x – Washington Wizards	34	38	.472	15.0	72
9	pi – Indiana Pacers	34	38	.472	15.0	72
10	pi – Charlotte Hornets	33	39	.458	16.0	72
11	Chicago Bulls	31	41	.431	18.0	72
12	Toronto Raptors	27	45	.375	22.0	72
13	Cleveland Cavaliers	22	50	.306	27.0	72
14	Orlando Magic	21	51	.292	28.0	72
15	Detroit Pistons	20	52	.278	29.0	72

Notes

- z – Clinched home court advantage for the entire playoffs
- c – Clinched home court advantage for the conference playoffs
- y – Clinched division title
- x – Clinched playoff spot
- pb – Clinched play-in spot
- o – Eliminated from playoff contention
- * – Division leader

== Game log ==
=== Preseason ===
2020 preseason game log
Total: 3–1 (Home: 1–1; Road: 2–0)
Preseason: 3–1 (home: 1–1; road: 2–0)

Game	Date	Team	Score	High points	High rebounds	High assists	Location Attendance	Record
1	December 11	Houston	L 104–125	Coby White (15)	Vonleh, Gafford (8)	Satoranský, White (6)	United Center; 0	0–1
2	December 13	Houston	W 104–91	Zach LaVine (23)	Zach LaVine (9)	Arcidiacono, LaVine, White (5)	United Center; 0	1–1
3	December 16	@ Oklahoma City	W 124–103	Coby White (27)	Otto Porter Jr. (12)	Zach LaVine (5)	Chesapeake Energy Arena; 0	2–1
4	December 18	@ Oklahoma City	W 105–103	Lauri Markkanen (22)	Coby White (9)	Wendell Carter Jr. (6)	Chesapeake Energy Arena; 0	3–1

2020–21 season schedule

=== Regular season ===
2020–21 game log
Total: 31–41 (Home: 15–21; Road: 16–20)
December: 2–3 (home: 0–3; road: 2–0)

Game	Date	Team	Score	High points	High rebounds	High assists	Location Attendance	Record
1	December 23	Atlanta	L 104–124	Zach LaVine (22)	Lauri Markkanen (7)	Coby White (7)	United Center; 0	0–1
2	December 26	Indiana	L 106–125	Zach LaVine (17)	Lauri Markkanen (9)	Tomáš Satoranský (9)	United Center; 0	0–2
3	December 27	Golden State	L 128–129	Zach LaVine (33)	Wendell Carter Jr. (13)	Coby White (5)	United Center; 0	0–3
4	December 29	@ Washington	W 115–107	Zach LaVine (23)	Wendell Carter Jr. (12)	LaVine, Satoranský, White (6)	Capital One Arena; 0	1–3
5	December 31	@ Washington	W 133–130	Otto Porter Jr. (28)	Otto Porter Jr. (12)	Coby White (10)	Capital One Arena; 0	2–3

January: 5–8 (home: 2–3; road: 3–5)

Game	Date	Team	Score	High points	High rebounds	High assists	Location Attendance	Record
6	January 1	@ Milwaukee	L 96–126	Zach LaVine (16)	LaVine, Williams (6)	Carter Jr., Felicio, White (3)	Fiserv Forum; 0	2–4
7	January 3	Dallas	W 118–108	Zach LaVine (39)	Carter Jr., Porter Jr., White (7)	Zach LaVine (5)	United Center; 0	3–4
8	January 5	@ Portland	W 111–108	Coby White (21)	Otto Porter Jr. (13)	Zach LaVine (9)	Moda Center; 0	4–4
9	January 6	@ Sacramento	L 124–128	Coby White (36)	Wendell Carter Jr. (17)	Coby White (7)	Golden 1 Center; 0	4–5
10	January 8	@ LA Lakers	L 115–117	Zach LaVine (38)	Patrick Williams (8)	Zach LaVine (6)	Staples Center; 0	4–6
11	January 10	@ LA Clippers	L 127–130	Zach LaVine (45)	Coby White (8)	Coby White (13)	Staples Center; 0	4–7
PPD	January 12	Boston	Postponed (COVID-19) (Makeup date: May 7)					
12	January 15	@ Oklahoma City	L 125–127 (OT)	Zach LaVine (35)	Wendell Carter Jr. (11)	Coby White (7)	Chesapeake Energy Arena; 0	4–8
13	January 17	@ Dallas	W 117–101	Lauri Markkanen (29)	Lauri Markkanen (10)	Zach LaVine (10)	American Airlines Center; 0	5–8
14	January 18	Houston	W 125–120	Zach LaVine (33)	Thaddeus Young (9)	Zach LaVine (7)	United Center; 0	6–8
15	January 22	@ Charlotte	W 123–110	Zach LaVine (25)	Otto Porter Jr. (8)	Zach LaVine (9)	Spectrum Center; 0	7–8
16	January 23	LA Lakers	L 90–101	Zach LaVine (21)	Zach LaVine (10)	LaVine, White (4)	United Center; 0	7–9
17	January 25	Boston	L 103–119	Zach LaVine (30)	Thaddeus Young (9)	Thaddeus Young (9)	United Center; 0	7–10
PPD	January 27	@ Memphis	Postponed (COVID-19) (Makeup date: April 12)					
18	January 30	Portland	L 122–123	Lauri Markkanen (31)	Thaddeus Young (11)	Thaddeus Young (11)	United Center; 0	7–11

February: 8–6 (home: 5–4; road: 3–2)

Game	Date	Team	Score	High points	High rebounds	High assists	Location Attendance	Record
19	February 1	New York	W 110–102	Lauri Markkanen (30)	Daniel Gafford (9)	Thaddeus Young (8)	United Center; 0	8–11
20	February 3	New York	L 103–107	Zach LaVine (24)	Patrick Williams (7)	Zach LaVine (7)	United Center; 0	8–12
21	February 5	@ Orlando	L 119–123	Zach LaVine (26)	Williams, Young (7)	Zach LaVine (8)	Amway Center; 3,535	8–13
22	February 6	@ Orlando	W 118–92	Zach LaVine (39)	Patrick Williams (10)	Tomáš Satoranský (6)	Amway Center; 3,880	9–13
23	February 8	Washington	L 101–105	Zach LaVine (35)	Garrett Temple (9)	LaVine, Young (6)	United Center; 0	9–14
24	February 10	New Orleans	W 129–116	Zach LaVine (46)	LaVine, Young (7)	Tomáš Satoranský (8)	United Center; 0	10–14
25	February 12	LA Clippers	L 106–125	Zach LaVine (26)	Zach LaVine (9)	Tomáš Satoranský (7)	United Center; 0	10–15
26	February 15	@ Indiana	W 120–112 (OT)	Zach LaVine (30)	Thaddeus Young (11)	Coby White (8)	Bankers Life Fieldhouse; 0	11–15
PPD	February 17	@ Charlotte	Postponed (COVID-19) (Makeup date: May 6)					
27	February 17	Detroit	W 105–102	Zach LaVine (37)	Thaddeus Young (10)	Thaddeus Young (7)	United Center; 0	12–15
28	February 19	@ Philadelphia	L 105–112	Zach LaVine (30)	Thaddeus Young (9)	LaVine, White (5)	Wells Fargo Center; 0	12–16
29	February 20	Sacramento	W 122–114	Zach LaVine (38)	Patrick Williams (11)	Wendell Carter Jr. (5)	United Center; 0	13–16
30	February 22	@ Houston	W 120–100	Coby White (24)	Wendell Carter Jr. (13)	Zach LaVine (6)	Toyota Center; 3,025	14–16
31	February 24	Minnesota	W 133–126 (OT)	Zach LaVine (35)	Wendell Carter Jr. (10)	White, Young (6)	United Center; 0	15–16
32	February 26	Phoenix	L 97–106	Zach LaVine (24)	Thaddeus Young (10)	Thaddeus Young (5)	United Center; 0	15–17
PPD	February 28	@ Toronto	Postponed (COVID-19) (Makeup date: April 8)					

March: 4–10 (home: 2–6; road: 2–4)

Game	Date	Team	Score	High points	High rebounds	High assists	Location Attendance	Record
33	March 1	Denver	L 112–118	Zach LaVine (23)	Coby White (10)	LaVine, Satoranský (5)	United Center; 0	15–18
34	March 3	@ New Orleans	W 128–124	Zach LaVine (36)	Wendell Carter Jr. (15)	Zach LaVine (8)	Smoothie King Center; 2,700	16–18
35	March 11	Philadelphia	L 105–127	Lauri Markkanen (23)	Wendell Carter Jr. (9)	Zach LaVine (7)	United Center; 0	16–19
36	March 12	Miami	L 90–101	Zach LaVine (30)	Thaddeus Young (10)	Zach LaVine (6)	United Center; 0	16–20
37	March 14	Toronto	W 118–95	Patrick Williams (23)	Wendell Carter Jr. (11)	Satoranský, Young (7)	United Center; 0	17–20
38	March 16	Oklahoma City	W 123–102	Zach LaVine (40)	Carter Jr., Young (9)	Tomáš Satoranský (8)	United Center; 0	18–20
39	March 17	San Antonio	L 99–106	Zach LaVine (29)	Patrick Williams (14)	Tomáš Satoranský (7)	United Center; 0	18–21
40	March 19	@ Denver	L 127–131 (OT)	Zach LaVine (32)	Thaddeus Young (10)	Thaddeus Young (6)	Ball Arena; 0	18–22
41	March 21	@ Detroit	W 100–86	Zach LaVine (18)	Daniel Gafford (11)	Tomáš Satoranský (9)	Little Caesars Arena; 750	19–22
42	March 22	Utah	L 95–120	Zach LaVine (27)	Thaddeus Young (9)	LaVine, Satoranský (4)	United Center; 0	19–23
43	March 24	Cleveland	L 94–103	Zach LaVine (22)	Wendell Carter Jr. (9)	LaVine, Satoranský (4)	United Center; 0	19–24
44	March 27	@ San Antonio	L 104–120	Nikola Vučević (21)	Nikola Vučević (9)	Thaddeus Young (9)	AT&T Center; 3,334	19–25
45	March 29	@ Golden State	L 102–116	Nikola Vučević (21)	Nikola Vučević (9)	Tomáš Satoranský (8)	Chase Center; 0	19–26
46	March 31	@ Phoenix	L 116–121	Nikola Vučević (24)	Markkanen, Vučević, Young (10)	Tomáš Satoranský (7)	Phoenix Suns Arena; 3,459	19–27

April: 7–10 (home: 3–3; road: 4–7)

Game	Date	Team	Score	High points	High rebounds	High assists	Location Attendance	Record
47	April 2	@ Utah	L 106–113	Thaddeus Young (25)	Nikola Vučević (8)	Satoranský, Valentine, Vučević (4)	Vivint Arena; 5,546	19–28
48	April 4	Brooklyn	W 115–107	Zach LaVine (25)	Nikola Vučević (13)	Tomáš Satoranský (11)	United Center; 0	20–28
49	April 6	@ Indiana	W 113–97	Nikola Vučević (32)	Nikola Vučević (17)	LaVine, White (6)	Bankers Life Fieldhouse; 0	21–28
50	April 8	@ Toronto	W 122–113	LaVine, Vučević (22)	Daniel Theis (10)	Zach LaVine (13)	Amalie Arena; 0	22–28
51	April 9	@ Atlanta	L 108–120	Zach LaVine (50)	Nikola Vučević (10)	Tomáš Satoranský (10)	State Farm Arena; 996	22–29
52	April 11	@ Minnesota	L 117–121	Zach LaVine (30)	Thaddeus Young (8)	LaVine, Satoranský (6)	Target Center; 1,436	22–30
53	April 12	@ Memphis	L 90–101	Zach LaVine (21)	Nikola Vučević (10)	Zach LaVine (9)	FedExForum; 2,194	22–31
54	April 14	Orlando	L 106–115	Zach LaVine (30)	Nikola Vučević (11)	Zach LaVine (7)	United Center; 0	22–32
55	April 16	Memphis	L 115–126	Coby White (27)	Nikola Vučević (14)	Coby White (7)	United Center; 0	22–33
56	April 17	Cleveland	W 106–96	Nikola Vučević (25)	Nikola Vučević (7)	Coby White (9)	United Center; 0	23–33
57	April 19	@ Boston	W 102–96	Nikola Vučević (29)	Nikola Vučević (9)	Coby White (7)	TD Garden; 0	24–33
58	April 21	@ Cleveland	L 105–121	Lauri Markkanen (16)	Thaddeus Young (8)	Coby White (6)	Rocket Mortgage FieldHouse; 0	24–34
59	April 22	Charlotte	W 108–91	Vučević, White, Young (18)	Nikola Vučević (16)	Tomáš Satoranský (7)	United Center; 0	25–34
60	April 24	@ Miami	L 101–106	Coby White (31)	Nikola Vučević (14)	Nikola Vučević (6)	AmericanAirlines Arena; 0	25–35
61	April 26	@ Miami	W 110–102	Nikola Vučević (24)	Daniel Theis (12)	Thaddeus Young (8)	AmericanAirlines Arena; 0	26–35
62	April 28	@ New York	L 94–113	Nikola Vučević (26)	Nikola Vučević (18)	Coby White (9)	Madison Square Garden; 1,981	26–36
63	April 30	Milwaukee	L 98–108	Coby White (21)	Nikola Vučević (15)	Coby White (7)	United Center; 0	26–37

May: 5–4 (home: 3–2; road: 2–2)

Game	Date	Team	Score	High points	High rebounds	High assists	Location Attendance	Record
64	May 1	@ Atlanta	L 97–108	Thaddeus Young (20)	Lauri Markkanen (11)	Thaddeus Young (9)	State Farm Arena; 3,053	26–38
65	May 3	Philadelphia	L 94–106	Coby White (23)	Daniel Theis (8)	Tomáš Satoranský (6)	United Center; 0	26–39
66	May 6	@ Charlotte	W 120–99	Nikola Vučević (29)	Nikola Vučević (14)	Thaddeus Young (8)	Spectrum Center; 3,769	27–39
67	May 7	Boston	W 121–99	LaVine, White (25)	Nikola Vučević (14)	Nikola Vučević (10)	United Center; 3,399	28–39
68	May 9	@ Detroit	W 108–96	Zach LaVine (30)	Nikola Vučević (16)	Tomáš Satoranský (7)	Little Caesars Arena; 750	29–39
69	May 11	Brooklyn	L 107–115	Zach LaVine (41)	Nikola Vučević (12)	Nikola Vučević (6)	United Center; 3,434	29–40
70	May 13	Toronto	W 114–102	Zach LaVine (24)	Nikola Vučević (16)	Coby White (10)	United Center; 3,395	30–40
71	May 15	@ Brooklyn	L 91–105	Patrick Williams (24)	Thaddeus Young (13)	Coby White (6)	Barclays Center; 1,773	30–41
72	May 16	Milwaukee	W 118–112	Thaddeus Young (20)	Christiano Felicio (8)	Coby White (5)	United Center; 3,427	31–41

2020–21 season schedule

== Player statistics ==
Player	Pos.	GP	GS	MP	Reb.	Ast.	Stl.	Blk.	Pts.
Al-Farouq Aminu^{≠}	SF/PF	6	0	67	19	2	2	0	9
Ryan Arcidiacono	PG	44	0	450	67	56	9	0	136
Troy Brown^{≠}	SF	13	0	237	44	10	7	2	71
Wendell Carter^{†}	C	32	25	792	250	69	18	24	348
Devon Dotson	PG	11	0	50	5	7	4	0	23
Cristiano Felício	C	18	0	84	26	9	4	0	23
Daniel Gafford^{†}	C	31	11	383	103	17	11	34	147
Javonte Green^{≠}	SG/PG	16	0	128	19	6	10	4	41
Chandler Hutchison^{†}	SF	7	0	64	20	4	1	0	13
Luke Kornet^{†}	PF/C	13	0	94	15	4	2	7	26
Zach LaVine	SG	58	58	2,034	289	282	46	27	1,591
Lauri Markkanen	PF	51	26	1,317	268	45	26	15	695
Adam Mokoka	SG/SF	14	0	56	5	5	2	1	15
Otto Porter^{†}	SF	25	6	540	138	50	12	4	247
Tomáš Satoranský	PG	58	18	1,307	142	271	40	14	447
Garrett Temple	PG	56	25	1,528	160	124	43	30	423
Daniel Theis^{≠}	C	23	14	574	136	41	16	14	230
Denzel Valentine	SG/SF	62	3	1,036	197	105	30	7	406
Nikola Vučević^{≠}	C	26	26	848	300	102	23	20	559
Coby White	PG	69	54	2,156	284	328	38	15	1,041
Patrick Williams	PF	71	71	1,983	327	99	64	46	655
Thaddeus Young	PF	68	23	1,652	423	291	74	40	823

After all games.
^{‡}Waived during the season
^{†}Traded during the season
^{≠}Acquired during the season

== Transactions ==
=== Trades ===
March 15, 2021	To Chicago Bulls Nikola Vučević; Al-Farouq Aminu	To Orlando Magic Wendell Carter Jr. Otto Porter Jr. 2021 first-round pick 2023 first-round pick
March 25, 2021	To Chicago Bulls Troy Brown Jr. (from Washington); Javonte Green (from Boston); Daniel Theis (from Boston); Cash considerations (from Boston and Washington)	To Boston Celtics Luke Kornet (from Chicago); Moritz Wagner (from Washington)
March 25, 2021	To Washington Wizards Daniel Gafford (from Chicago); Chandler Hutchison (from Chicago)	

=== Free agency ===
==== Re-signed ====
Player	Signed
Denzel Valentine	1-year contract worth $4.6 million (November 21, 2020)
Adam Mokoka	Two-way contract (November 22, 2020)

==== Additions ====
Player	Signed	Former team
Devon Dotson	Two-way contract (November 19, 2020)	Kansas Jayhawks
Zach Norvell Jr.	1-year contract worth $1.4 million (November 27, 2020)	Santa Cruz Warriors
Noah Vonleh	1-year contract worth $2 million (November 27, 2020)	Denver Nuggets
Garrett Temple	1-year contract worth $4.7 million (November 27, 2020)	Brooklyn Nets
Simisola Shittu	Exhibit 10 contract (December 6, 2020)	Brooklyn Nets

==== Subtractions ====
Player	Reason left	New team
Noah Vonleh	Waived (December 14, 2020)	Brooklyn Nets
Zach Norvell Jr.	Waived (December 19, 2020)	Santa Cruz Warriors
Simisola Shittu	Waived (December 19, 2020)	Westchester Knicks
