= 2024–25 Chicago Bulls season =

2024–25 NBA season by team

- Head coach: Billy Donovan
- President: Michael Reinsdorf
- General manager: Marc Eversley
- Owner: Jerry Reinsdorf
- Arena: United Center

Results
- Record: 39–43 (.476)
- Place: Division: 5th (Central); Conference: 9th (Eastern)
- Playoff finish: Did not qualify
- Stats at Basketball Reference

Local media
- Television: Chicago Sports Network
- Radio: WLS; WSCR

The 2024–25 Chicago Bulls season was the 59th season for the franchise in the National Basketball Association (NBA).

On March 8, 2025, the Chicago Bulls' championship banners were damaged by pyrotechnics during a Disturbed concert, which caused their banners to be removed from sight from the general public for the rest of the season as the team looked to restore the damage done to them entering the following season. On April 1, the Chicago Bulls gained a play-in berth following a victory over the Toronto Raptors, being the last team in the Eastern Conference to get a secured spot in at least the NBA play-in tournament for the season. They finished the season 39–43 for the second straight time.

On April 16, the Bulls were eliminated from playoff contention for the third season in a row after losing in the first stage of the play-in tournament to the Miami Heat. After the end of the season, the Bulls would lose a coin flip for greater lottery draft odds at the #11 pick in the 2025 NBA draft; that selection would later rise up to become the #1 pick of that draft, with the Dallas Mavericks (who won that coin flip in question) acquiring the #1 pick in the process there after that franchise never rose up in the NBA draft lottery before that year.

The Chicago Bulls drew an average home attendance of 20,138, the 3rd highest of all basketball teams in the world.

== Draft ==
Round	Pick	Player	Position	Nationality	College / club
1	11	Matas Buzelis	SF	United States; Lithuania	NBA G League Ignite

The Bulls entered this draft (which was two days long instead of one day long like it had been ever since the NBA draft was shortened down to two rounds back in 1989) with just one first-round pick. The team's second-round selection was conveyed to the Philadelphia 76ers as the more favorable pick because Chicago finished with a worse record in the previous season than the New Orleans Pelicans, to whom Chicago had originally traded the selection to acquire Lonzo Ball in 2021. On the first night of the draft, with their only pick of the draft, the Bulls would select American-Lithuanian small forward Matas Buzelis from the now-defunct NBA G League Ignite.

== Roster ==
2024–25 Chicago Bulls roster
Players

Pos.	No.	Player	Height	Weight	DOB	From
G	2	Lonzo Ball	6 ft 6 in (1.98 m)	190 lb (86 kg)	1997-10-27	UCLA
F	14	Matas Buzelis	6 ft 10 in (2.08 m)	209 lb (95 kg)	2004-10-13	Sunrise Christian (KS)
G	5	Jevon Carter	6 ft 1 in (1.85 m)	200 lb (91 kg)	1995-09-14	West Virginia
F/C	12	Zach Collins	6 ft 11 in (2.11 m)	250 lb (113 kg)	1997-11-19	Gonzaga
G	11	Ayo Dosunmu (injured)	6 ft 5 in (1.96 m)	200 lb (91 kg)	2000-01-17	Illinois
G	3	Josh Giddey	6 ft 8 in (2.03 m)	216 lb (98 kg)	2002-10-10	Australia
G	22	Talen Horton-Tucker	6 ft 4 in (1.93 m)	234 lb (106 kg)	2000-11-25	Iowa State
G/F	13	Kevin Huerter	6 ft 7 in (2.01 m)	198 lb (90 kg)	1998-08-27	Maryland
G	30	Tre Jones	6 ft 1 in (1.85 m)	185 lb (84 kg)	2000-01-08	Duke
F	32	E. J. Liddell (TW)	6 ft 6 in (1.98 m)	240 lb (109 kg)	2000-12-18	Ohio State
F	20	Emanuel Miller (TW)	6 ft 7 in (2.01 m)	215 lb (98 kg)	2000-06-19	TCU
F	15	Julian Phillips	6 ft 8 in (2.03 m)	198 lb (90 kg)	2003-11-05	Tennessee
F/C	7	Jalen Smith	6 ft 9 in (2.06 m)	215 lb (98 kg)	2000-03-16	Maryland
F	25	Dalen Terry	6 ft 7 in (2.01 m)	195 lb (88 kg)	2002-07-12	Arizona
C	9	Nikola Vučević	6 ft 10 in (2.08 m)	260 lb (118 kg)	1990-10-24	USC
G	0	Coby White	6 ft 5 in (1.96 m)	195 lb (88 kg)	2000-02-16	North Carolina
F	44	Patrick Williams	6 ft 7 in (2.01 m)	215 lb (98 kg)	2001-08-26	Florida State
G	17	Jahmir Young (TW)	6 ft 1 in (1.85 m)	185 lb (84 kg)	2000-10-07	Maryland

Coaches
Head coach
- Billy Donovan
Assistant(s)
- John Bryant
- Damian Cotter
- Dan Craig
- Henry Domercant
- Billy Schmidt
- Wes Unseld Jr.

Legend
- (DP) Unsigned draft pick
- (FA) Free agent
- (S) Suspended
- (GL) On assignment to G League affiliate
- (TW) Two-way affiliate player
- Injured

Roster
Updated: February 3, 2025

== Standings ==
=== Division ===
Central Division	W	L	PCT	GB	Home	Road	Div	GP
c – Cleveland Cavaliers	64	18	.780	–	34‍–‍7	30‍–‍11	12‍–‍4	82
x – Indiana Pacers	50	32	.610	14.0	29‍–‍12	21‍–‍20	10‍–‍6	82
x – Milwaukee Bucks	48	34	.585	16.0	28‍–‍14	20‍–‍20	9‍–‍7	82
x – Detroit Pistons	44	38	.537	20.0	22‍–‍19	22‍–‍19	5‍–‍11	82
pi – Chicago Bulls	39	43	.476	25.0	18‍–‍23	21‍–‍20	4‍–‍12	82

=== Conference ===
Eastern Conference
#	Team	W	L	PCT	GB	GP
1	c – Cleveland Cavaliers *	64	18	.780	–	82
2	y – Boston Celtics *	61	21	.744	3.0	82
3	x – New York Knicks	51	31	.622	13.0	82
4	x – Indiana Pacers	50	32	.610	14.0	82
5	x – Milwaukee Bucks	48	34	.585	16.0	82
6	x – Detroit Pistons	44	38	.537	20.0	82
7	y – Orlando Magic *	41	41	.500	23.0	82
8	pi – Atlanta Hawks	40	42	.488	24.0	82
9	pi – Chicago Bulls	39	43	.476	25.0	82
10	x – Miami Heat	37	45	.451	27.0	82
11	Toronto Raptors	30	52	.366	34.0	82
12	Brooklyn Nets	26	56	.317	38.0	82
13	Philadelphia 76ers	24	58	.293	40.0	82
14	Charlotte Hornets	19	63	.232	45.0	82
15	Washington Wizards	18	64	.220	46.0	82

== Game log ==
=== Preseason ===
2024 preseason game log
Total: 3–2 (Home: 2–1; Road: 1–1)
Preseason: 3–2 (home: 2–1; road: 1–1)

Game	Date	Team	Score	High points	High rebounds	High assists	Location Attendance	Record
1	October 8	@ Cleveland	W 116–112	Coby White (21)	Smith, Vučević (10)	Dalen Terry (4)	Rocket Mortgage FieldHouse	1–0
2	October 12	Memphis	L 121–124	Zach LaVine (28)	Julian Phillips (8)	Josh Giddey (7)	United Center; 20,465	1–1
3	October 14	@ Milwaukee	L 107–111	Adama Sanogo (16)	Adama Sanogo (15)	Giddey, Terry (5)	Fiserv Forum; 12,725	1–2
4	October 16	Minnesota	W 125–123	Coby White (23)	Nikola Vučević (12)	Josh Giddey (9)	United Center; 17,218	2–2
5	October 18	Cleveland	W 139–137 (OT)	Ayo Dosunmu (19)	Nikola Vučević (12)	Coby White (8)	United Center; 18,704	3–2

2024–25 preseason schedule

=== Regular season ===
2024–25 game log
Total: 39–43 (Home: 18–23; Road: 21–20)
October: 3–2 (home: 1–1; road: 2–1)

Game	Date	Team	Score	High points	High rebounds	High assists	Location Attendance	Record
1	October 23	@ New Orleans	L 111–123	Zach LaVine (27)	Nikola Vučević (11)	Coby White (6)	Smoothie King Center; 18,581	0–1
2	October 25	@ Milwaukee	W 133–122	Coby White (35)	Nikola Vučević (10)	Josh Giddey (9)	Fiserv Forum; 17,790	1–1
3	October 26	Oklahoma City	L 95–114	Zach LaVine (22)	Nikola Vučević (13)	Ayo Dosunmu (6)	United Center; 20,923	1–2
4	October 28	@ Memphis	W 126–123	Zach LaVine (30)	Josh Giddey (13)	Josh Giddey (8)	FedExForum; 15,906	2–2
5	October 30	Orlando	W 102–99	Coby White (21)	Nikola Vučević (14)	Giddey, Vučević (5)	United Center; 19,015	3–2

November: 5–11 (home: 1–6; road: 4–5)

Game	Date	Team	Score	High points	High rebounds	High assists	Location Attendance	Record
6	November 1	@ Brooklyn	L 112–120	Nikola Vučević (28)	Nikola Vučević (11)	Josh Giddey (8)	Barclays Center; 17,977	3–3
7	November 4	Utah	L 126–135	Coby White (28)	Nikola Vučević (10)	Josh Giddey (7)	United Center; 19,621	3–4
8	November 6	@ Dallas	L 99–119	Nikola Vučević (14)	Nikola Vučević (10)	Josh Giddey (6)	American Airlines Center; 20,011	3–5
9	November 7	Minnesota	L 119–135	Nikola Vučević (25)	Giddey, Smith (6)	Josh Giddey (13)	United Center; 19,621	3–6
10	November 9	@ Atlanta	W 125–113	Ayo Dosunmu (19)	Nikola Vučević (12)	Giddey, LaVine (7)	State Farm Arena; 17,826	4–6
11	November 11	Cleveland	L 113–119	Zach LaVine (26)	Patrick Williams (10)	Josh Giddey (7)	United Center; 20,560	4–7
12	November 13	@ New York	W 124–123	Zach LaVine (31)	Nikola Vučević (11)	Zach LaVine (8)	Madison Square Garden; 19,812	5–7
13	November 15	@ Cleveland	L 126–144	Coby White (29)	Nikola Vučević (8)	LaVine, Williams (9)	Rocket Mortgage FieldHouse; 19,432	5–8
14	November 17	Houston	L 107–143	Zach LaVine (15)	Josh Giddey (9)	Ayo Dosunmu (6)	United Center; 20,667	5–9
15	November 18	@ Detroit	W 122–112	Nikola Vučević (29)	Nikola Vučević (12)	Josh Giddey (10)	Little Caesars Arena; 18,022	6–9
16	November 20	@ Milwaukee	L 106–122	Zach LaVine (27)	Craig, Vučević (6)	LaVine, Vučević (6)	Fiserv Forum; 17,341	6–10
17	November 22	Atlanta	W 136–122	Zach LaVine (26)	Nikola Vučević (13)	Coby White (9)	United Center; 19,979	7–10
18	November 23	Memphis	L 131–142	Zach LaVine (29)	Nikola Vučević (8)	Josh Giddey (8)	United Center; 19,449	7–11
19	November 26	@ Washington	W 127–108	Coby White (21)	Nikola Vučević (12)	Josh Giddey (8)	Capital One Arena; 15,921	8–11
20	November 27	@ Orlando	L 119–133	Ayo Dosunmu (21)	Nikola Vučević (11)	Zach LaVine (10)	Kia Center; 18,309	8–12
21	November 29	Boston	L 129–138	Nikola Vučević (32)	Nikola Vučević (11)	Josh Giddey (9)	United Center; 19,798	8–13

December: 7–5 (home: 3–4; road: 4–1)

Game	Date	Team	Score	High points	High rebounds	High assists	Location Attendance	Record
22	December 2	Brooklyn	W 128–102	Nikola Vučević (21)	Josh Giddey (13)	Josh Giddey (11)	United Center; 19,131	9–13
23	December 5	@ San Antonio	W 139–124	Nikola Vučević (39)	Ayo Dosunmu (10)	Ayo Dosunmu (11)	Frost Bank Center; 17,720	10–13
24	December 6	Indiana	L 123–132	Zach LaVine (32)	Nikola Vučević (9)	Coby White (9)	United Center; 19,544	10–14
25	December 8	Philadelphia	L 100–108	Zach LaVine (30)	Nikola Vučević (8)	Josh Giddey (11)	United Center; 18,837	10–15
26	December 13	Charlotte	W 109–95	Ayo Dosunmu (19)	Jalen Smith (11)	Josh Giddey (7)	United Center; 19,543	11–15
27	December 16	@ Toronto	W 122–121	Nikola Vučević (24)	Josh Giddey (9)	Josh Giddey (8)	Scotiabank Arena; 16,324	12–15
28	December 19	@ Boston	W 117–108	Zach LaVine (36)	Nikola Vučević (14)	Dosunmu, LaVine, Vučević (4)	TD Garden; 19,156	13–15
29	December 21	Boston	L 98–123	Nikola Vučević (19)	Nikola Vučević (10)	Ayo Dosunmu (6)	United Center; 19,803	13–16
30	December 23	Milwaukee	L 91–112	Nikola Vučević (17)	Nikola Vučević (12)	Ayo Dosunmu (11)	United Center; 21,234	13–17
31	December 26	@ Atlanta	L 133–141	Zach LaVine (37)	Nikola Vučević (8)	Coby White (9)	State Farm Arena; 17,760	13–18
32	December 28	Milwaukee	W 116–111	Giddey, Vučević (23)	Josh Giddey (15)	Josh Giddey (10)	United Center; 21,511	14–18
33	December 30	@ Charlotte	W 115–108 (OT)	Coby White (23)	Nikola Vučević (13)	Coby White (9)	Spectrum Center; 19,197	15–18

January: 6–10 (home: 4–5; road: 2–5)

Game	Date	Team	Score	High points	High rebounds	High assists	Location Attendance	Record
34	January 1	@ Washington	L 107–125	Zach LaVine (32)	Nikola Vučević (14)	Vučević, White (6)	Capital One Arena; 16,298	15–19
35	January 4	New York	W 139–126	LaVine, White (33)	Nikola Vučević (12)	Josh Giddey (8)	United Center; 22,491	16–19
36	January 6	San Antonio	W 114–110	Zach LaVine (35)	Nikola Vučević (11)	Zach LaVine (8)	United Center; 18,886	17–19
37	January 8	@ Indiana	L 113–129	Zach LaVine (31)	Smith, Vučević (7)	Giddey, White (5)	Gainbridge Fieldhouse; 16,758	17–20
38	January 10	Washington	W 138–105	Zach LaVine (33)	Giddey, Vučević (13)	Josh Giddey (7)	United Center; 21,391	18–20
39	January 12	Sacramento	L 119–124	Zach LaVine (36)	Josh Giddey (11)	Josh Giddey (7)	United Center; 18,233	18–21
40	January 14	New Orleans	L 113–119	Zach LaVine (25)	Nikola Vučević (15)	Josh Giddey (12)	United Center; 17,210	18–22
41	January 15	Atlanta	L 94–110	Coby White (16)	Nikola Vučević (16)	Zach LaVine (7)	United Center; 17,692	18–23
42	January 17	Charlotte	L 123–125	Nikola Vučević (40)	Nikola Vučević (13)	LaVine, White (8)	United Center; 20,598	18–24
43	January 19	@ Portland	L 102–113	Zach LaVine (27)	Nikola Vučević (11)	Nikola Vučević (7)	Moda Center; 16,976	18–25
44	January 20	@ L.A. Clippers	W 112–99	Zach LaVine (35)	Josh Giddey (10)	Josh Giddey (9)	Intuit Dome; 15,293	19–25
45	January 23	@ Golden State	L 106–131	Zach LaVine (24)	Josh Giddey (11)	Ball, LaVine, Vučević (4)	Chase Center; 18,064	19–26
46	January 25	Philadelphia	L 97–109	Zach LaVine (25)	Nikola Vučević (12)	Josh Giddey (7)	United Center; 20,153	19–27
47	January 27	Denver	W 129–121	Zach LaVine (21)	Nikola Vučević (10)	Josh Giddey (10)	United Center; 19,661	20–27
48	January 29	@ Boston	L 100–122	White, Williams (16)	Smith, Vučević (11)	Josh Giddey (6)	TD Garden; 19,156	20–28
49	January 31	@ Toronto	W 122–106	Coby White (25)	Nikola Vučević (12)	Ayo Dosunmu (8)	Scotiabank Arena; 19,365	21–28

February: 3–8 (home: 2–5; road: 1–3)

Game	Date	Team	Score	High points	High rebounds	High assists	Location Attendance	Record
50	February 2	@ Detroit	L 119–127	Coby White (22)	Nikola Vučević (11)	Nikola Vučević (10)	Little Caesars Arena; 20,062	21–29
51	February 4	Miami	W 133–124	Buzelis, Giddey (24)	Nikola Vučević (11)	Ayo Dosunmu (9)	United Center; 19,389	22–29
52	February 5	@ Minnesota	L 108–127	Coby White (20)	Nikola Vučević (11)	Jevon Carter (6)	Target Center; 18,978	22–30
53	February 8	Golden State	L 111–132	Coby White (27)	Josh Giddey (6)	Matas Buzelis (5)	United Center; 21,297	22–31
54	February 11	Detroit	L 92–132	Matas Buzelis (12)	Nikola Vučević (7)	Carter, Giddey, Huerter (4)	United Center; 18,321	22–32
55	February 12	Detroit	L 110–128	Ayo Dosunmu (23)	Nikola Vučević (14)	Ayo Dosunmu (6)	United Center; 18,916	22–33
All-Star Game
56	February 20	@ New York	L 111–113 (OT)	Josh Giddey (27)	Josh Giddey (16)	Coby White (6)	Madison Square Garden; 19,812	22–34
57	February 22	Phoenix	L 117–121	Josh Giddey (24)	Nikola Vučević (11)	Josh Giddey (10)	United Center; 21,116	22–35
58	February 24	@ Philadelphia	W 142–110	Josh Giddey (25)	Josh Giddey (16)	Giddey, White (6)	Wells Fargo Center; 19,765	23–35
59	February 26	L.A. Clippers	L 117–122	Collins, Giddey (21)	Zach Collins (17)	Josh Giddey (12)	United Center; 20,356	23–36
60	February 28	Toronto	W 125–115 (OT)	Coby White (24)	Zach Collins (13)	Josh Giddey (12)	United Center; 20,938	24–36

March: 9–6 (home: 3–2; road: 6–4)

Game	Date	Team	Score	High points	High rebounds	High assists	Location Attendance	Record
61	March 2	@ Indiana	L 112–127	Coby White (26)	Josh Giddey (9)	Josh Giddey (7)	Gainbridge Fieldhouse; 17,028	24–37
62	March 4	Cleveland	L 117–139	Coby White (25)	Zach Collins (12)	Jones, White (7)	United Center; 20,943	24–38
63	March 6	@ Orlando	W 125–123	Coby White (44)	Josh Giddey (13)	Josh Giddey (9)	Kia Center; 17,717	25–38
64	March 8	@ Miami	W 114–109	Josh Giddey (26)	Zach Collins (15)	Josh Giddey (12)	Kaseya Center; 19,700	26–38
65	March 10	Indiana	W 121–103	Giddey, White (29)	Nikola Vučević (11)	Tre Jones (8)	United Center; 20,697	27–38
66	March 13	Brooklyn	W 116–110	Coby White (31)	Collins, Huerter (9)	Tre Jones (6)	United Center; 21,647	28–38
67	March 15	@ Houston	L 114–117	Coby White (23)	Vučević, White (7)	Tre Jones (6)	Toyota Center; 18,055	28–39
68	March 17	@ Utah	W 111–97	Coby White (26)	Nikola Vučević (10)	Tre Jones (12)	Delta Center; 18,175	29–39
69	March 19	@ Phoenix	L 121–127	Vučević, White (24)	Collins, Giddey (7)	Tre Jones (9)	PHX Arena; 17,071	29–40
70	March 20	@ Sacramento	W 128–116	Coby White (35)	Nikola Vučević (14)	Nikola Vučević (8)	Golden 1 Center; 16,960	30–40
71	March 22	@ L.A. Lakers	W 146–115	Coby White (36)	Nikola Vučević (12)	Josh Giddey (17)	Crypto.com Arena; 18,997	31–40
72	March 24	@ Denver	W 129–119	Coby White (37)	Jalen Smith (9)	Josh Giddey (9)	Ball Arena; 19,816	32–40
73	March 27	L.A. Lakers	W 119–117	Coby White (26)	Josh Giddey (14)	Josh Giddey (11)	United Center; 21,957	33–40
74	March 29	Dallas	L 119–120	Matas Buzelis (28)	Coby White (11)	Buzelis, Huerter (6)	United Center; 21,045	33–41
75	March 31	@ Oklahoma City	L 117–145	Jevon Carter (17)	Giddey, Vučević (8)	Josh Giddey (10)	Paycom Center; 18,203	33–42

April: 6–1 (home: 4–0; road: 2–1)

Game	Date	Team	Score	High points	High rebounds	High assists	Location Attendance	Record
76	April 1	Toronto	W 137–118	Coby White (28)	Zach Collins (12)	Josh Giddey (12)	United Center; 20,005	34–42
77	April 4	Portland	W 118–113	White, Vučević (31)	Josh Giddey (19)	Josh Giddey (12)	United Center; 21,572	35–42
78	April 6	@ Charlotte	W 131–117	Coby White (37)	Nikola Vučević (11)	Josh Giddey (8)	Spectrum Center; 18,499	36–42
79	April 8	@ Cleveland	L 113–135	Patrick Williams (21)	Zach Collins (13)	Buzelis, Williams (5)	Rocket Arena; 19,432	36–43
80	April 9	Miami	W 119–111	Josh Giddey (28)	Josh Giddey (16)	Josh Giddey (11)	United Center; 20,509	37–43
81	April 11	Washington	W 119–89	Julian Phillips (23)	Nikola Vučević (12)	Nikola Vučević (8)	United Center; 21,400	38–43
82	April 13	@ Philadelphia	W 122–102	Kevin Huerter (18)	Jalen Smith (10)	Talen Horton-Tucker (6)	Wells Fargo Center; 20,059	39–43

2024–25 season schedule

=== Play-in ===
2025 play-in game log
Total: 0–1 (Home: 0–1; Road: 0–0)
Play-in: 0–1 (home: 0–1; road: 0–0)

Game	Date	Team	Score	High points	High rebounds	High assists	Location Attendance	Record
1	April 16	Miami	L 90–109	Josh Giddey (25)	Nikola Vučević (12)	Coby White (5)	United Center; 21,380	0–1

2024–25 season schedule

=== NBA Cup ===
The groups were revealed during the tournament announcement on July 12, 2024.

==== East Group C ====
Pos	Team	Pld	W	L	PF	PA	PD	Qualification
1	Atlanta Hawks	4	3	1	485	470	+15	Advance to knockout stage
2	Boston Celtics	4	3	1	482	459	+23	
3	Cleveland Cavaliers	4	2	2	480	450	+30	
4	Chicago Bulls	4	2	2	518	512	+6	
5	Washington Wizards	4	0	4	408	482	−74	

Source: NBA
Rules for classification: Tiebreakers

== Player statistics ==
Player	Pos.	GP	GS	MP	Reb.	Ast.	Stl.	Blk.	Pts.
Lonzo Ball	PG	35	14	777	118	115	47	17	267
Matas Buzelis	SF	80	31	1,511	278	79	29	75	688
Jevon Carter	PG	36	1	321	39	40	13	3	153
Zach Collins^{≠}	C	28	8	552	187	59	15	14	240
Torrey Craig^{‡}	F	9	1	113	25	5	2	1	62
Ayo Dosunmu	SG	46	26	1,394	161	208	43	18	566
Chris Duarte^{‡}	F	17	0	74	20	9	0	0	36
Josh Giddey	F	70	69	2,117	566	503	84	45	1,022
Talen Horton-Tucker	SG	58	0	724	100	83	21	11	379
Kevin Huerter^{≠}	SG	26	16	780	85	82	30	7	343
Tre Jones^{≠}	PG	18	9	455	58	88	19	5	207
Zach LaVine^{†}	SG	42	42	1,432	202	189	39	10	1,007
E. J. Liddell	PF	12	0	53	9	3	1	1	21
Emanuel Miller	PF	6	0	25	8	2	1	0	10
Julian Phillips	SF	79	5	1,123	169	39	38	20	366
Adama Sanogo^{‡}	PF	4	0	21	6	1	0	0	8
Jalen Smith	F	64	2	962	357	65	17	44	524
Dalen Terry	G	73	5	987	124	97	44	15	326
Nikola Vučević	C	73	72	2,278	735	256	61	52	1,349
Coby White	PG	74	73	2,450	273	330	69	16	1,509
Patrick Williams	PF	63	36	1,576	237	124	48	32	566
Jahmir Young	PG	6	0	30	3	6	0	0	11

After all games.
^{‡}Waived during the season
^{†}Traded during the season
^{≠}Acquired during the season

== Transactions ==
=== Trades ===
June 21, 2024	To Chicago Bulls Josh Giddey	To Oklahoma City Thunder Alex Caruso
July 8, 2024	Three-team trade
July 8, 2024	To Chicago Bulls Chris Duarte (from Sacramento); RaiQuan Gray (from San Antonio); Two second-round picks (from Sacramento); Cash considerations (from Sacramento)	To Sacramento Kings DeMar DeRozan (from Chicago)
July 8, 2024	To San Antonio Spurs Harrison Barnes (from Sacramento); 2031 first-round pick swap (from Sacramento)
February 3, 2025	Three-team trade
February 3, 2025	To Chicago Bulls Zach Collins (from San Antonio); Kevin Huerter (from Sacramento); Tre Jones (from San Antonio); 2025 CHI first-round pick (from San Antonio)	To Sacramento Kings Sidy Cissoko (from San Antonio); Zach LaVine (from Chicago); 2025 CHA protected first-round pick (from San Antonio); 2025 CHI second-round pick (from San Antonio); 2027 SAS first-round pick (from San Antonio); 2028 DEN protected second-round pick (from San Antonio); 2028 SAC second-round pick (from Chicago); 2031 MIN first-round pick (from San Antonio)
February 3, 2025	To San Antonio Spurs De'Aaron Fox (from Sacramento); Jordan McLaughlin (from Sacramento)

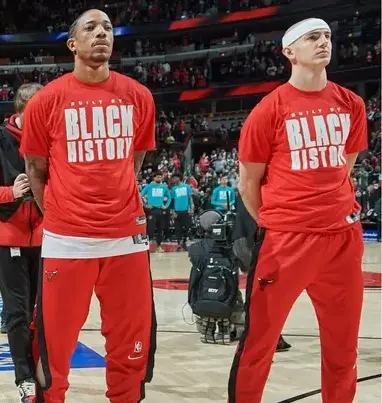
The Bulls traded DeMar DeRozan and Alex Caruso during the 2024 offseason

=== Free agency ===
==== Re-signed ====
Date	Player	Ref.
July 6	Adama Sanogo	
July 6	Patrick Williams	

==== Additions ====
Date	Player	Former Team	Ref.
July 8	Jalen Smith	Indiana Pacers	

==== Subtractions ====
Date	Player	Reason	New Team	Ref.
July 7	Andre Drummond	Free agency	Philadelphia 76ers	
