= Coby White =

American basketball player (born 2000)

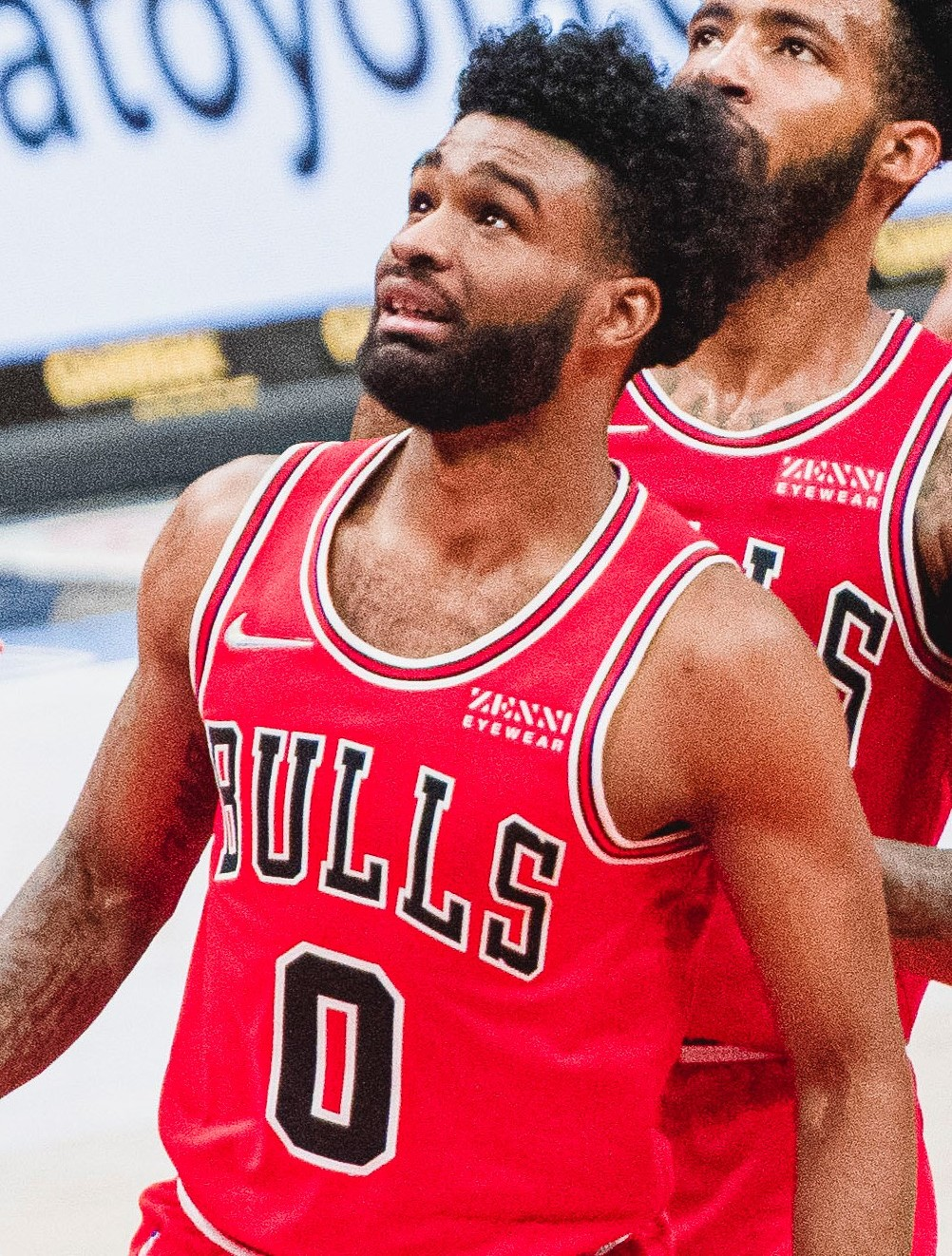
- White (in front) with the Chicago Bulls in 2022

No. 3 – Charlotte Hornets
- Position: Point guard
- League: NBA

Personal information
- Born: February 16, 2000 (age 26) Goldsboro, North Carolina, U.S.
- Listed height: 6 ft 5 in (1.96 m)
- Listed weight: 210 lb (95 kg)

Career information
- High school: Greenfield School (Wilson, North Carolina)
- College: North Carolina (2018–2019)
- NBA draft: 2019: 1st round, 7th overall pick
- Drafted by: Chicago Bulls
- Playing career: 2019–present

Career history
- 2019–2026: Chicago Bulls
- 2026–present: Charlotte Hornets

Career highlights
- NBA All-Rookie Second Team (2020); Second-team All-ACC (2019); ACC All-Freshman team (2019); 2× North Carolina Gatorade Player of the Year (2017, 2018); North Carolina Mr. Basketball (2018); McDonald's All-American (2018)
- Stats at NBA.com
- Stats at Basketball Reference
Medals
Representing United States
FIBA Americas U18 Championship
Gold medal – first place	2018 Canada	National team

Alec Jacoby "Coby" White (born February 16, 2000) is an American professional basketball player for the Charlotte Hornets of the National Basketball Association (NBA). He played college basketball for the North Carolina Tar Heels. White was a top high school player in North Carolina, finishing his career as the top prep scorer in state history. After being selected by the Chicago Bulls in the first round of the 2019 NBA draft with the seventh overall pick, he was named to the NBA All-Rookie Second Team in 2020. In 2024, White finished second in NBA Most Improved Player award behind Tyrese Maxey.

== High school career ==
White, a 6'4" combo guard, played high school basketball at the Greenfield School in Wilson, North Carolina. He scored 3,573 points over his four-year career, becoming the all-time leading scorer in North Carolina high school basketball history, a record previously held by JamesOn Curry. He was named North Carolina Gatorade Player of the Year in both his junior and senior seasons. At the close of his senior season, White was named North Carolina Mr. Basketball as the state's top high school player. White was also awarded the 2018 USA Today's North Carolina Player of the Year. He was named to the 2018 McDonald's All-American Game alongside fellow UNC signee Nassir Little. White also was nominated to the MaxPreps All-America first team.

During the summer after graduating, White was named to the United States U18 National team to compete in the 2018 FIBA Under-18 Americas Championship in Canada. White helped lead the team to a gold medal as the team's top scorer, earning all-tournament honors.

College recruiting
Name	Hometown	School	Height	Weight	Commit date
Coby White; PG	Goldsboro, NC	Greenfield School (NC)	6 ft 5 in (1.96 m)	170 lb (77 kg)	Jul 28, 2016
Coby White; PG	Recruit ratings: Rivals: 247Sports: ESPN: (91)				
Overall recruit ranking: Rivals: 26 247Sports: 26 ESPN: 23
Note: In many cases, Scout, Rivals, 247Sports, On3, and ESPN may conflict in their listings of height and weight.; In these cases, the average was taken. ESPN grades are on a 100-point scale.; Sources: "North Carolina 2018 Basketball Commitments". Rivals.; "2018 North Carolina Tar Heels Recruiting Class". ESPN.; "2018 Team Ranking". Rivals.

== College career ==
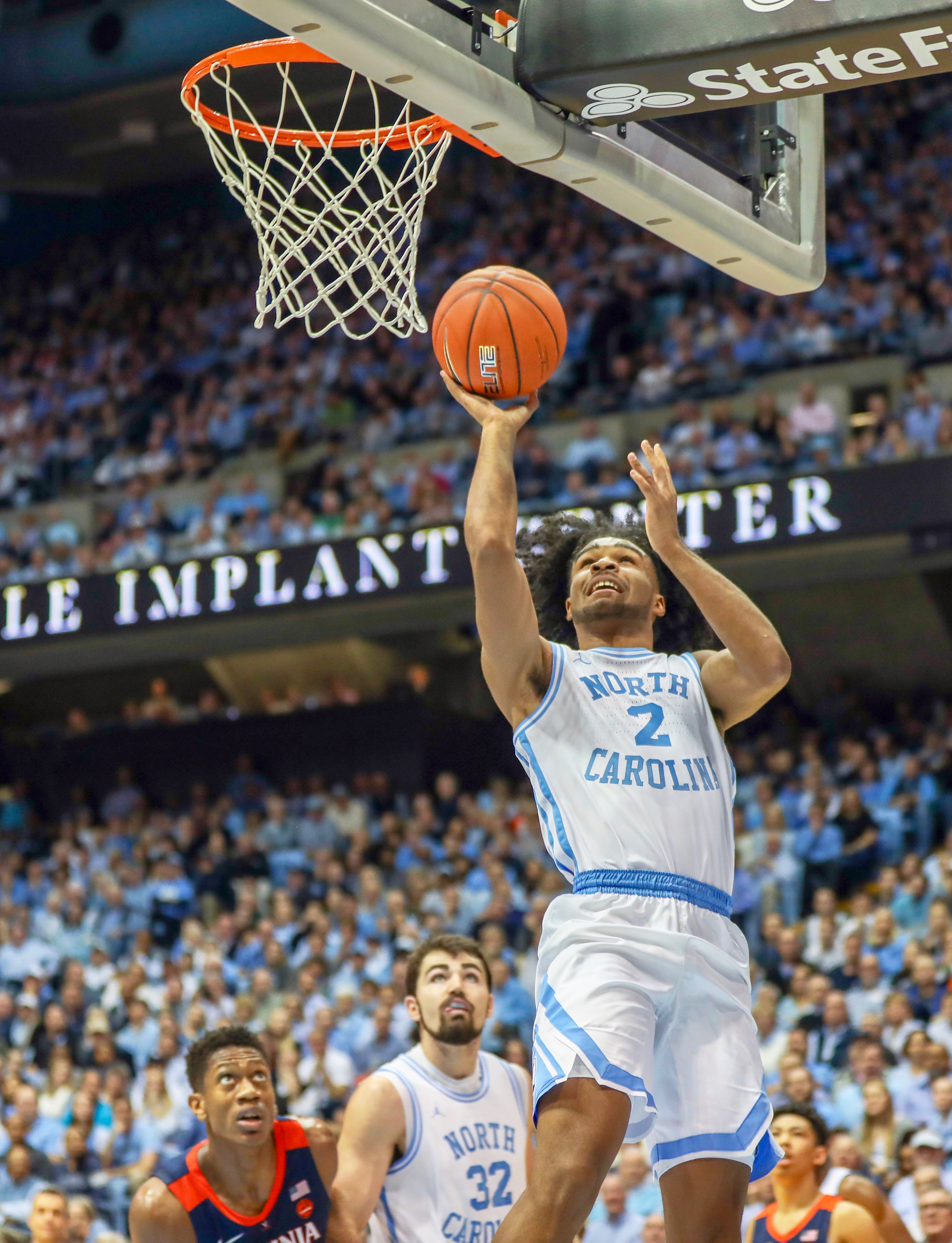
White at UNC

White signed a National Letter of Intent to play for North Carolina on November 8, 2017. White made his debut in a game against Wofford on November 6, 2018, starting at point guard, and recording eight points and three assists in North Carolina's 78–67 win over Wofford. On February 26, 2019, when his team was playing against Syracuse, White scored a career-high 34 points while leading the Tar Heels to a 93–85 victory. On March 5, White passed Michael Jordan in North Carolina's all-time freshman scoring list with 469 in North Carolina's 79–66 win over Boston College. White helped lead the team in the 2019 NCAA tournament, where they were eventually defeated by Auburn 97–80 in the Sweet 16 round of the tournament. White also broke a North Carolina basketball freshman record of three point shooting, hitting 82 during his college season. On April 3, 2019, White declared for the 2019 NBA draft after one season at North Carolina, where he earned All-ACC 2nd Team honors.

== Professional career ==
=== Chicago Bulls (2019–2026) ===
On June 20, 2019, the Chicago Bulls drafted Coby White with the seventh overall pick in the 2019 NBA draft. White is the first player from North Carolina to be drafted in the first round by the Bulls since Michael Jordan in 1984. On July 1, White signed with the Bulls. White participated in the 2019 NBA Summer League with fellow 2019 draftee Daniel Gafford, where he averaged 15.0 points, 5.6 rebounds, and 4.8 assists per game. On October 23, White made his debut in the NBA, coming off the bench in a 126–125 loss to the Charlotte Hornets with 17 points, three rebounds and seven assists. This game made him the first player born in the 2000s to play in the NBA.

On November 12, 2019, White hit seven 3-pointers in the fourth quarter against the New York Knicks, setting a Bulls franchise record for most 3-pointers made in a single quarter, and finished with 27 points in the 120–102 victory. On February 22, 2020, White scored a then career-high 33 points in a 112–104 loss to the Phoenix Suns. White would match that career high the next day, leading the Bulls to a 126–117 win over the Washington Wizards. White became the first rookie in NBA history with consecutive 30-point games off the bench. On February 25, White continued the streak and exceeded his career-high, scoring 35 points in a 124–122 loss to the Oklahoma City Thunder. On September 15, 2020, White was named to the 2019–20 NBA All-Rookie Second Team by the NBA.

On February 10, 2021, White finished with 30 points, eight 3-pointers, and 7 assists in a 129–116 win over the New Orleans Pelicans, setting a Bulls franchise record with teammate Zach LaVine when they each made 8 shots from behind the arc.

On June 10, 2021, White underwent left shoulder surgery and was ruled out for at least four months. On September 22, the Bulls exercised their fourth-year option on White, keeping him under team control through the 2022–23 season.

On January 31, 2023, in a 108–103 loss to the Los Angeles Clippers, White became the fastest player (237 games) in Bulls franchise history to make 500 career three-point baskets. On July 7, 2023, White signed a three-year, $36 million contract extension with the Bulls.

On April 17, 2024, White scored a then career-high 42 points in a 131–116 win over the Atlanta Hawks in the play-in tournament. It was the second-most in play-in tournament history behind Jayson Tatum’s 50 points game in 2021.

On April 23, 2024, White finished second in the race for 2023–24 NBA Most Improved Player, losing narrowly to Philadelphia's Tyrese Maxey.

On January 4, 2025, White scored 33 points and a career-high nine three-pointers in a 139–126 win against the New York Knicks. On March 6, White scored a career-high 44 points in a 125–123 victory over the Orlando Magic. On March 17, he was awarded Eastern Conference Player of the Week for the first time in his career after averaging 27.0 PPG for three games. Three days later, White scored 35 points in a 128–116 win over the Sacramento Kings. On March 22, White put up 36 points in a 146–115 win against the Los Angeles Lakers. On March 24, he was awarded his second career Player of the Week. He became the second Bulls player to win the award in back-to-back weeks, following Michael Jordan. On April 1, he was awarded his first Player Of the Month award. He became the sixth Bull to earn the award, joining Jordan, Pippen, Rose, Butler, and DeRozan. White made 74 appearances (73 starts) for the Bulls during the 2024–25 NBA season, averaging 20.4 points, 3.7 rebounds, and 4.5 assists.

White played in 29 games (including 26 starts) for Chicago in the 2025–26 season, recording averages of 18.6 points, 3.7 rebounds, and 4.7 assists.

=== Charlotte Hornets (2026–present) ===
On February 4, 2026, White and Mike Conley Jr. were traded to the Charlotte Hornets in exchange for Ousmane Dieng, Collin Sexton and multiple second-round draft picks. On February 24, he made his debut for the Hornets in a 131–99 win against the Chicago Bulls. In 21 appearances for Charlotte, White averaged 15.6 points, 3.0 rebounds, and 3.0 assists.

On July 6, 2026, White re-signed with the Hornets on a three-year, $74 million contract.

== Career statistics ==
Legend
GP	Games played	GS	Games started	MPG	Minutes per game
FG%	Field goal percentage	3P%	3-point field goal percentage	FT%	Free throw percentage
RPG	Rebounds per game	APG	Assists per game	SPG	Steals per game
BPG	Blocks per game	PPG	Points per game	**Bold**	Career high

=== NBA ===
==== Regular season ====
Year	Team	GP	GS	MPG	FG%	3P%	FT%	RPG	APG	SPG	BPG	PPG
2019–20	Chicago	65	1	25.8	.394	.354	.791	3.5	2.7	.8	.1	13.2
2020–21	Chicago	69	54	31.2	.416	.359	.901	4.1	4.8	.6	**.2**	15.1
2021–22	Chicago	61	17	27.5	.433	.385	.857	3.0	2.9	.5	**.2**	12.7
2022–23	Chicago	74	2	23.4	.443	.372	.871	2.9	2.8	.7	.1	9.7
2023–24	Chicago	**79**	**78**	**36.5**	.447	.376	.838	**4.5**	**5.1**	.7	.2	19.1
2024–25	Chicago	74	73	33.1	.453	.370	**.902**	3.7	4.5	**.9**	**.2**	**20.4**
2025–26	Chicago	29	26	29.1	.438	.346	.805	3.7	4.7	.7	.1	18.6
2025–26	Charlotte	21	0	19.3	**.461**	**.391**	.839	3.0	3.0	.2	.1	15.6
Career		472	251	29.3	.434	.369	.856	3.6	3.9	.7	.2	15.4

==== Playoffs ====
Year	Team	GP	GS	MPG	FG%	3P%	FT%	RPG	APG	SPG	BPG	PPG
2022	Chicago	5	0	19.6	.333	.276	.800	3.4	1.8	.2	.0	8.4
Career		5	0	19.6	.333	.276	.800	3.4	1.8	.2	.0	8.4

=== College ===
Year	Team	GP	GS	MPG	FG%	3P%	FT%	RPG	APG	SPG	BPG	PPG
2018–19	North Carolina	35	35	28.5	.423	.353	.800	3.5	4.1	1.1	.3	16.1

== Personal life ==
White is a Christian. White's father, Donald, previously played college basketball at North Carolina Central before becoming a factory worker until his death on August 15, 2017, to liver cancer. His mother is a claims manager for an insurance company. He also has a sister and an older brother, Will, who played basketball and is currently an assistant coach for Mars Hill University. He has a personal connection with NBA player Chris Paul, as he played for Paul's Amateur Athletic Union (AAU) program, Team CP3.
