= Patrick Williams (basketball) =

American basketball player (born 2001)

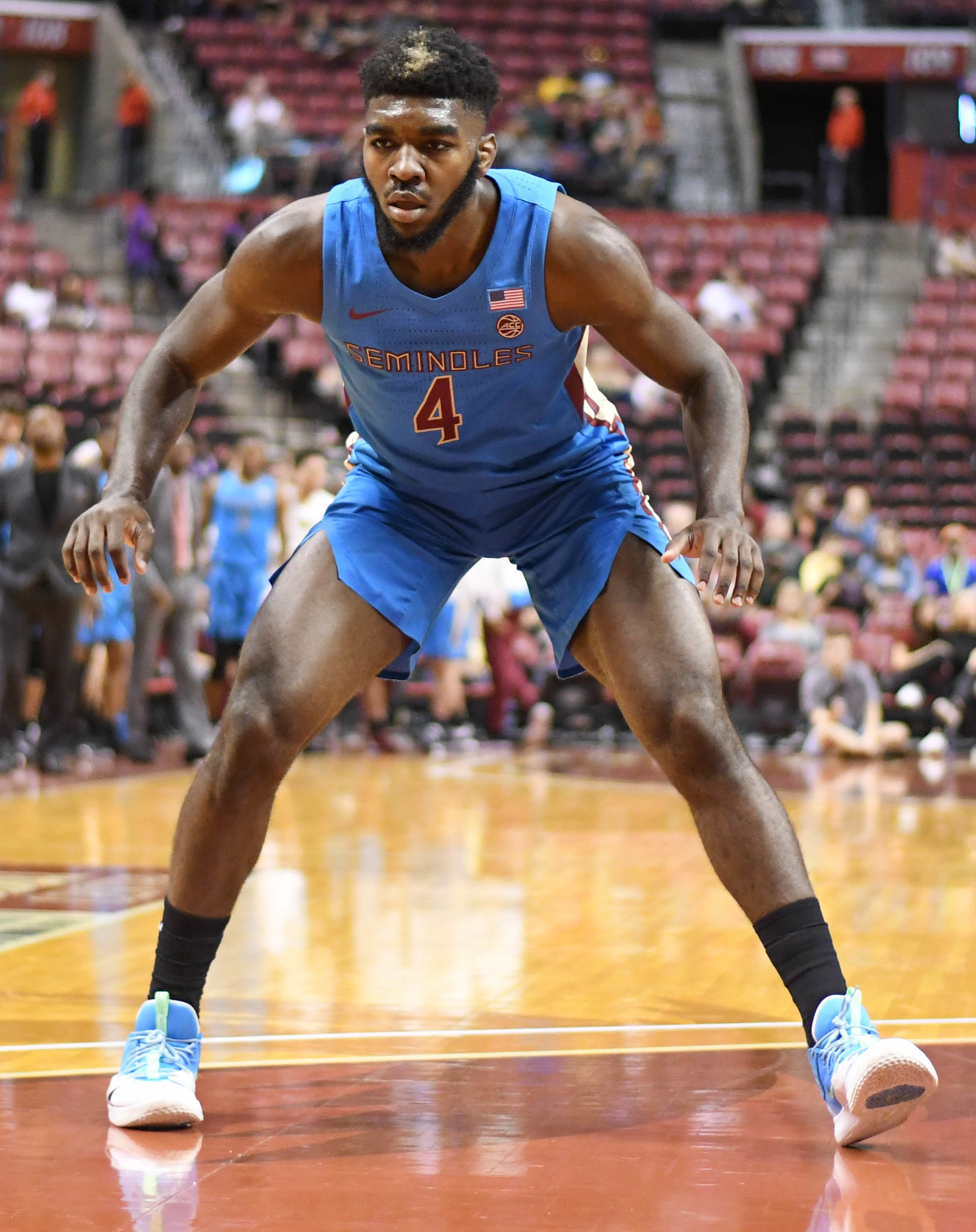
- Williams with Florida State in 2019

No. 44 – Chicago Bulls
- Position: Power forward / small forward
- League: NBA

Personal information
- Born: August 26, 2001 (age 25) Charlotte, North Carolina, U.S.
- Listed height: 6 ft 7 in (2.01 m)
- Listed weight: 235 lb (107 kg)

Career information
- High school: West Charlotte (Charlotte, North Carolina)
- College: Florida State (2019–2020)
- NBA draft: 2020: 1st round, 4th overall pick
- Drafted by: Chicago Bulls
- Playing career: 2020–present

Career history
- 2020–present: Chicago Bulls

Career highlights
- NBA All-Rookie Second Team (2021); ACC Sixth Man of The Year (2020); ACC All-Freshman Team (2020)
- Stats at NBA.com
- Stats at Basketball Reference

Patrick Lee Williams (born August 26, 2001) is an American professional basketball player for the Chicago Bulls of the National Basketball Association (NBA). He played college basketball for the Florida State Seminoles. He was the fourth pick in the 2020 NBA draft.

== Early life ==
Williams was born on August 26, 2001, in Charlotte, North Carolina. His parents, Eddie and Janie, played college basketball at Johnson C. Smith University. Williams grew up in Charlotte and attended West Charlotte High School. He was a four-year starter on the Mighty Lions' varsity basketball team. Williams averaged 20.7 points, 7.7 rebounds, 3.7 assists and 2.8 steals in his junior season. Williams was rated a four-star recruit and a consensus top-50 prospect in his class. Williams committed to play college basketball at Florida State over offers from Arizona, Clemson, Louisville, Maryland, NC State, Ohio State, Texas, Virginia Tech and Wake Forest.

As a senior in 2019, Williams averaged 22.1 points, 9.0 rebounds, 2.8 blocks and 3.1 assists per game and was named the Mecklenburg County Player of the Year by The Charlotte Observer as he led the Lions to the North Carolina 4A state championship game. Williams played in the 2019 Jordan Brand Classic. Williams finished his high school career with 1,787 points scored, 749 rebounds and 310 assists over four seasons.

== College career ==
Williams entered his freshman year rated as 21st-best prospect for the 2020 NBA draft according to ESPN. He spent the season as the Seminoles' sixth man. Williams scored 18 points with four rebounds against Western Carolina followed by a 16-point performance against Tennessee–Chattanooga. He scored 14 points and grabbed a career-high nine rebounds in a 65–59 win over North Carolina. The following game, he had 14 points in a 99–81 victory over Miami (Florida). Williams contributed 17 points and seven rebounds in an 80–77 win over Syracuse on February 15. Williams was named to the ACC All-Freshman team and the conference Sixth Man of the Year at the end of the regular season after averaging 9.2 points, 4.0 rebounds and one block per game. After the season, Williams declared for the 2020 NBA draft alongside teammate Devin Vassell.

== Professional career ==
Williams was selected by the Chicago Bulls with the fourth overall pick in the 2020 NBA draft. On November 22, 2020, he signed his rookie scale contract with the Bulls. On December 23, 2020, Williams made his NBA debut, starting and putting up 16 points, four rebounds, one assist, one steal, and one block in a 104–124 loss against the Atlanta Hawks. On May 15, 2021, he scored a season-high 24 points, alongside five rebounds and two steals, in a 91–105 loss to the Brooklyn Nets.

On October 28, 2021, during the Bulls' 103–104 loss to the New York Knicks, Williams suffered a dislocated wrist. The following day, it was announced that he would need surgery, ruling him out for 4 to 6 months. Williams returned to the court on March 21, 2022, recording seven points and two rebounds in a 113–99 win over the Toronto Raptors. On April 10, he scored a career-high 35 points, alongside four rebounds and four assists, in a 124–120 win over the Minnesota Timberwolves. The Bulls qualified for the postseason for the first time since 2017 and faced the Milwaukee Bucks, the reigning champions, during their first-round series. Williams made his playoff debut on April 17, recording five points, three rebounds and two steals in a 86–93 game 1 loss. The Bulls ended up losing the series in five games.

On July 6, 2024, Williams re-signed with the Bulls for a reported five-year, $90 million contract

On September 30, 2024, Williams had been cleared for training camp after experiencing foot discomfort during the Bull's minicamp.

== Career statistics ==
Legend
GP	Games played	GS	Games started	MPG	Minutes per game
FG%	Field goal percentage	3P%	3-point field goal percentage	FT%	Free throw percentage
RPG	Rebounds per game	APG	Assists per game	SPG	Steals per game
BPG	Blocks per game	PPG	Points per game	**Bold**	Career high

=== NBA ===
==== Regular season ====
Year	Team	GP	GS	MPG	FG%	3P%	FT%	RPG	APG	SPG	BPG	PPG
2020–21	Chicago	71	**71**	27.9	.483	.391	.728	**4.6**	1.4	**.9**	.6	9.2
2021–22	Chicago	17	9	24.8	**.529**	**.517**	.732	4.1	.9	.5	.5	9.0
2022–23	Chicago	**82**	65	**28.3**	.464	.415	**.857**	4.0	1.2	**.9**	**.9**	**10.2**
2023–24	Chicago	43	30	27.3	.443	.399	.788	3.9	1.5	**.9**	.8	10.0
2024–25	Chicago	63	36	25.0	.397	.353	.723	3.8	**2.0**	.8	.5	9.0
2025–26	Chicago	72	6	20.5	.372	.347	.720	3.0	1.5	.7	.4	7.0
Career		348	217	25.7	.438	.381	.762	3.9	1.5	.8	.6	9.0

==== Playoffs ====
Year	Team	GP	GS	MPG	FG%	3P%	FT%	RPG	APG	SPG	BPG	PPG
2022	Chicago	5	5	30.6	.468	.333	.727	5.4	.8	1.0	.6	11.8
Career		5	5	30.6	.468	.333	.727	5.4	.8	1.0	.6	11.8

=== College ===
Year	Team	GP	GS	MPG	FG%	3P%	FT%	RPG	APG	SPG	BPG	PPG
2019–20	Florida State	29	0	22.5	.459	.320	.838	4.0	1.0	1.0	1.0	9.2
