= Zach LaVine =

American basketball player (born 1995)

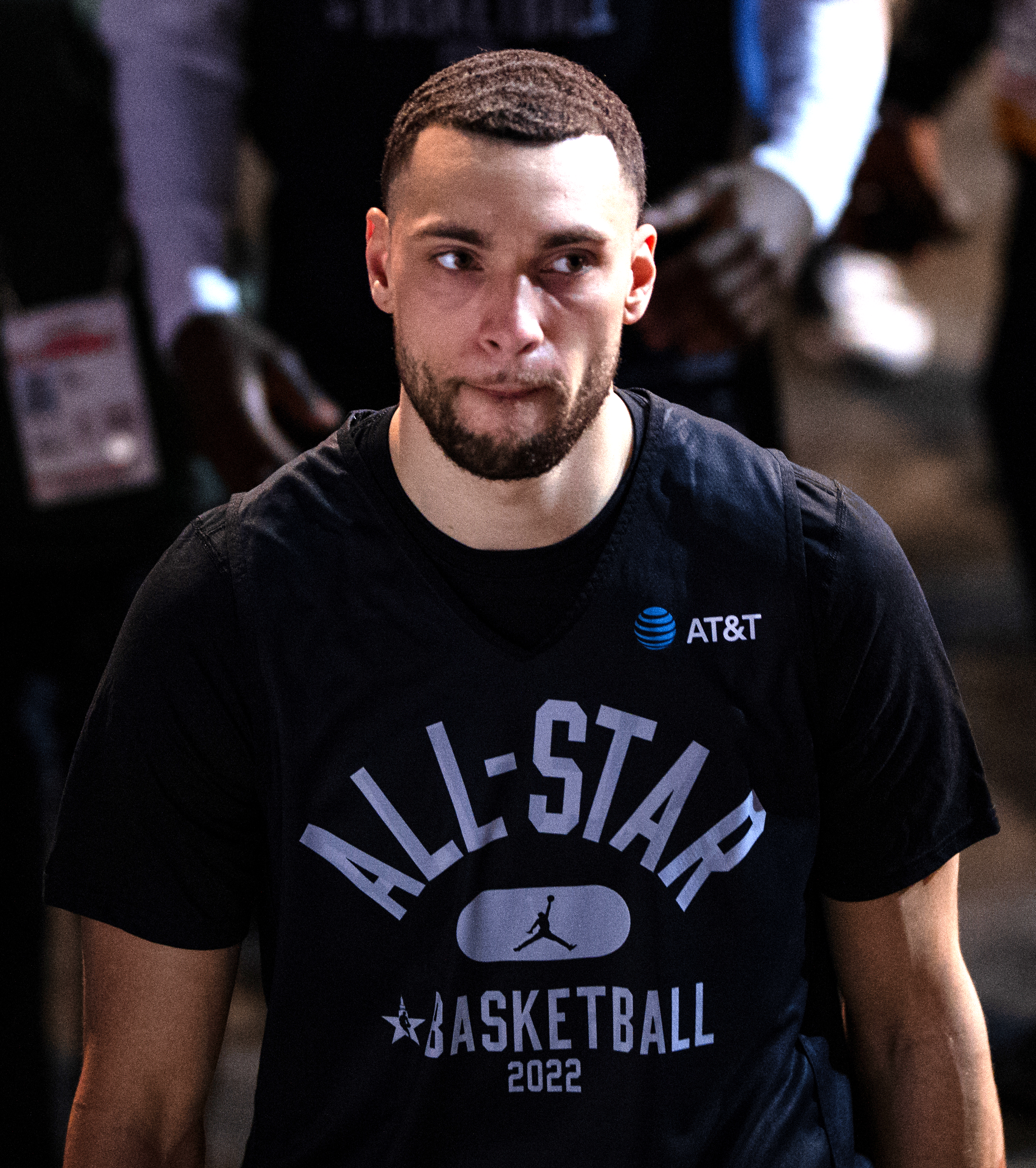
- LaVine at the 2022 NBA All-Star Weekend

No. 8 – Sacramento Kings
- Position: Shooting guard
- League: NBA

Personal information
- Born: March 10, 1995 (age 31) Renton, Washington, U.S.
- Listed height: 6 ft 5 in (1.96 m)
- Listed weight: 200 lb (91 kg)

Career information
- High school: Bothell (Bothell, Washington)
- College: UCLA (2013–2014)
- NBA draft: 2014: 1st round, 13th overall pick
- Drafted by: Minnesota Timberwolves
- Playing career: 2014–present

Career history
- 2014–2017: Minnesota Timberwolves
- 2017–2025: Chicago Bulls
- 2025–present: Sacramento Kings

Career highlights
- 2× NBA All-Star (2021, 2022); NBA All-Rookie Second Team (2015); 2× NBA Slam Dunk Contest champion (2015, 2016); Pac-12 All-Freshman Team (2014); First-team Parade All-American (2013); AP Washington Player of the Year (2013); Washington Mr. Basketball (2013)
- Stats at NBA.com
- Stats at Basketball Reference
Medals
Men's basketball
Representing the United States
Olympic Games
Gold medal – first place	2020 Tokyo	Team

Zachary Thomas LaVine (/ləˈviːn/ lə-VEEN; born March 10, 1995) is an American professional basketball player for the Sacramento Kings of the National Basketball Association (NBA). He was selected in the first round of the 2014 NBA draft with the 13th overall pick by the Minnesota Timberwolves. A two-time Slam Dunk Contest champion, he was named an NBA All-Star with the Chicago Bulls in 2021 and 2022. He also won a gold medal on the 2020 U.S. Olympic team in Tokyo.

LaVine grew up in the Seattle, Washington area, where he was honored as the state's top high school player. He played college basketball for the UCLA Bruins. After one season at UCLA, he entered the NBA after being named one of the top freshmen in the Pac-12 Conference. As a rookie with Minnesota, LaVine won the league's Slam Dunk Contest, and was named to the NBA All-Rookie Second Team. In 2016, he became the fourth NBA player to ever win consecutive dunk contests. He was traded to the Chicago Bulls in 2017, where he played for eight seasons before being traded to Sacramento in 2025.

== Early life ==
LaVine was born in the Seattle, Washington, suburb of Renton to athletic parents. His father, Paul, played American football professionally in the United States Football League (USFL) and National Football League (NFL), and his mother, CJ, was a softball player. Around the age of five, LaVine developed an interest in basketball after watching Chicago Bulls star Michael Jordan in the film Space Jam. Later, he also became a fan of Los Angeles Lakers star Kobe Bryant, and modeled his game after his childhood idols.

LaVine practiced playing in the family backyard, where his father had him repeatedly emulate the NBA's Three-Point Shootout. He attended Bothell High School in the Seattle suburb of Bothell. Playing point guard, he was their primary ball handler. By his junior year, he had grown to 6 ft 3 in (1.91 m), and he would practice dunking for hours in his backyard after his shooting routine would end.

As a senior, he averaged 28.5 points, 3.4 rebounds and 2.5 assists per game, and was named the 2013 Associated Press Washington state player of the year and Washington Mr. Basketball. He was also recognized nationally as a first-team Parade All-American. He played in the Ballislife All-American Game, and won the event's slam dunk contest. Considered a four-star recruit by Rivals.com, LaVine was listed as the No. 12 shooting guard and the No. 44 player in the nation in 2013.

== College career ==
On June 20, 2012, LaVine verbally committed to attending the University of California, Los Angeles (UCLA), and playing for coach Ben Howland for the 2013 season. After Howland was fired nine months later, LaVine considered staying in-state and attending the University of Washington instead. However, he decided to remain with UCLA and their new coach, Steve Alford; LaVine had inherited an affection for UCLA from his father, who grew up a fan of Bruins basketball while growing up in nearby San Bernardino, California.

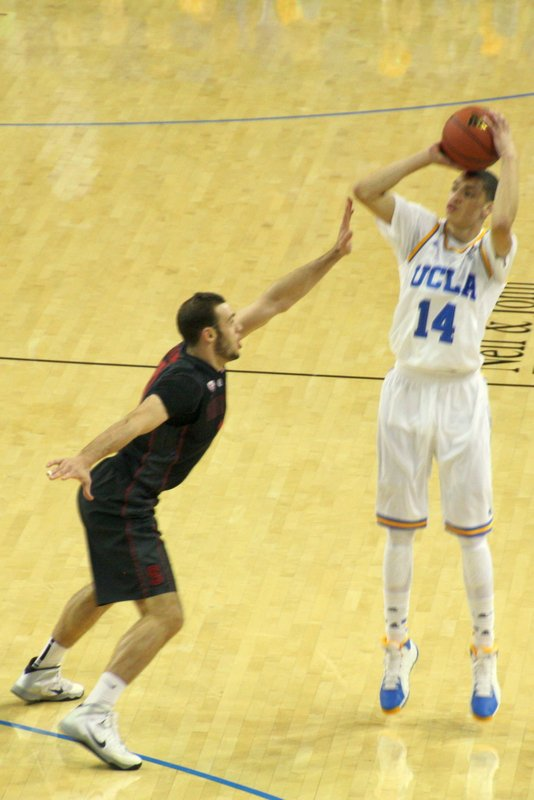
LaVine shooting against Stanford in 2014

After a strong start to 2013–14 as the team's sixth man, featuring an impressive display of outside shooting and explosive dunks, the former point guard LaVine evoked memories of former Bruin Russell Westbrook's UCLA beginnings. NBA draft pundits began ranking LaVine high on their projections for the 2014 NBA draft if he declared himself eligible. ESPN.com draft expert Chad Ford attributed LaVine's appeal to the Westbrook comparisons. At one point, Ford projected him as the 10th overall pick, while NBADraft.net ranked him fifth. During the season, LaVine typically entered the game with coach Alford's freshman son, Bryce Alford, who usually handled the ball, while starter Kyle Anderson was the team's main facilitator. During a six-game span beginning on January 26, 2014, LaVine endured a shooting slump where he made just 7 of 36 shots from the field. He averaged 9.4 points per game during the season, fourth best on the team, and his 48 three-point field goals made were the second most by a freshman in the school's history. However, LaVine did not reach double-figures in scoring in 14 of the final 18 games, and totaled just 11 points and was 0 for 8 on three-point attempts in the final five games. Despite his late-season struggles, he was voted to the Pac-12 All-Freshman Team, and he was named with Bryce Alford as the team's most valuable freshmen.

On April 16, 2014, he declared for the NBA draft, forgoing his final three years of college eligibility.

== Professional career ==
=== Minnesota Timberwolves (2014–2017) ===
LaVine was selected by the Minnesota Timberwolves with the 13th overall pick in the 2014 NBA draft. He signed his rookie-scale contract with the team on July 8, 2014. Over the first five games of the 2014–15 season, LaVine played a total of 12 minutes. When an ankle injury sidelined starter Ricky Rubio indefinitely, LaVine became the starting point guard over veteran Mo Williams. LaVine moved back into the starting lineup after back spasms sidelined Williams, who had become the starting guard again. On December 6 against the San Antonio Spurs, LaVine had 22 points and 10 assists for his first double-double.

Rubio returned in February 2015, resulting in a dip in playing time for LaVine. However, Williams was also traded that month which opened up more opportunities. LaVine won the Slam Dunk Contest during the 2015 NBA All-Star Weekend. He became the youngest champion since an 18-year-old Kobe Bryant in 1997. With a perfect 50 on each of his first two dunks, he was the first player since Dwight Howard in 2009 with a perfect score on multiple dunks, triumphing over future NBA MVP Giannis Antetokounmpo. LaVine also participated in the Rising Stars Challenge that weekend. On April 11, LaVine had a season-high 37 points, along with nine rebounds, in a loss to the Golden State Warriors. For the season, LaVine played in 77 games, starting in 40, and averaged 10.1 points, 2.8 rebounds and 3.6 assists, while shooting 42.2 percent overall and 34.1 percent on three-pointers. He was subsequently named to the NBA All-Rookie Second Team.

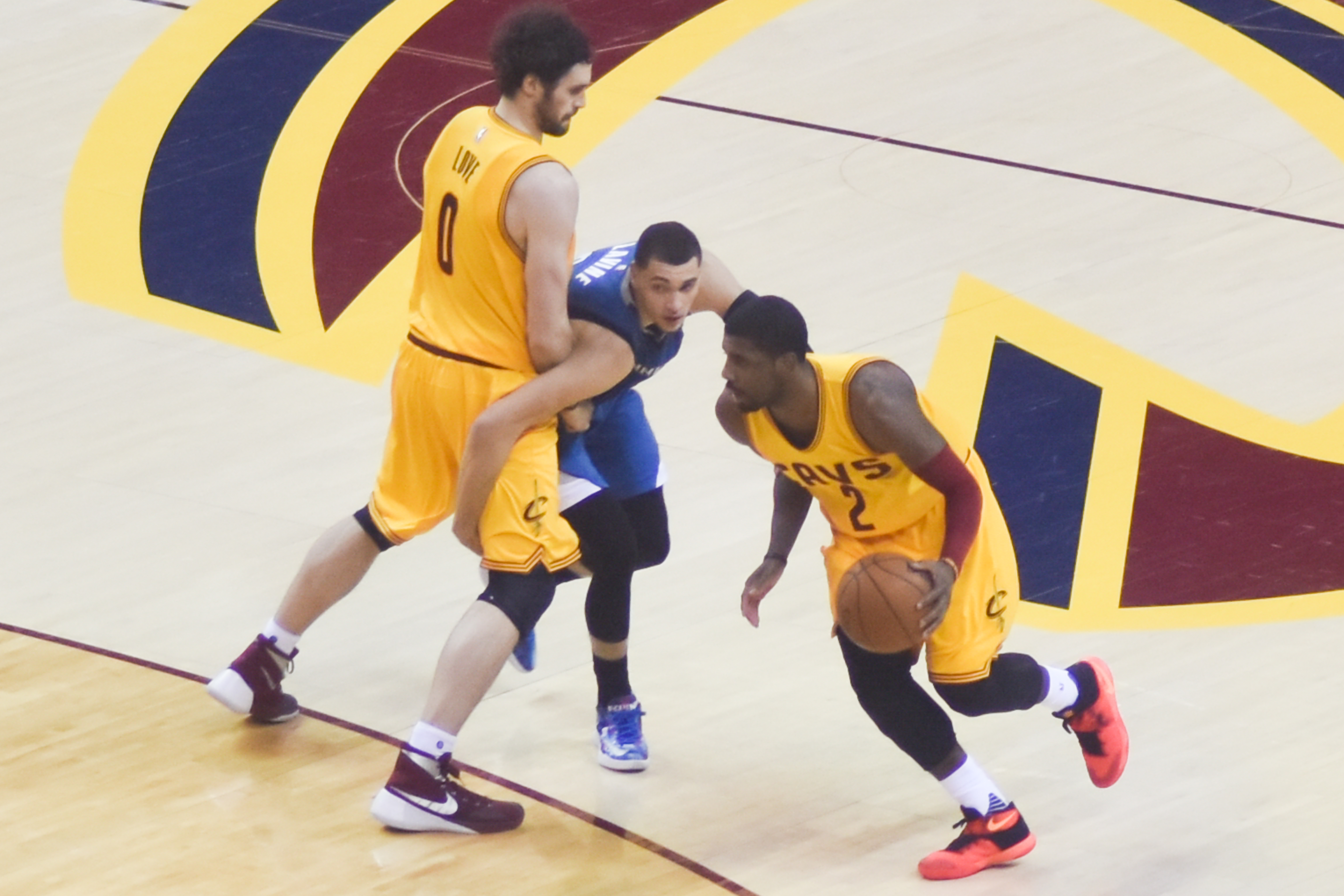
LaVine (middle) defending against the Cleveland Cavaliers in 2016

On October 21, 2015, the Timberwolves exercised their third-year team option on LaVine's rookie-scale contract, extending the contract through the 2016–17 season. With Ricky Rubio sidelined in early November, LaVine took over the starting point guard role and took advantage of the increased minutes. On November 13, he scored a season-high 26 points in a loss to the Indiana Pacers. He later topped that mark on December 13, scoring 28 points in a loss to the Phoenix Suns. During the 2016 All-Star Weekend, LaVine scored 30 points for Team USA in the Rising Stars Challenge to capture MVP honors. He also became the fourth player ever to win consecutive Slam Dunk Contests. (Note: He joined Jordan, Jason Richardson, and Nate Robinson.) The final round of the contest, which featured two tie-breakers with Aaron Gordon, drew comparisons to the contest between Michael Jordan and Dominique Wilkins in 1988.

On October 24, 2016, the Timberwolves exercised their fourth-year team option on LaVine's rookie scale contract, extending the contract through the 2017–18 season. On November 9, he tied his then career high with 37 points in a 123–107 win over the Orlando Magic. On December 23, he scored a then-career-high 40 points and tied a career best with seven three-pointers in a 109–105 loss against the Sacramento Kings. On February 4, 2017, LaVine was ruled out for the rest of the season after an MRI revealed he had a torn ACL in his left knee. Ten days later, he underwent successful surgery to reconstruct the knee.

=== Chicago Bulls (2017–2025) ===
==== 2017–2020: First seasons in Chicago and breakthrough ====
On June 22, 2017, LaVine was traded, along with Kris Dunn and the rights to Lauri Markkanen (the 7th pick in the 2017 NBA draft), to the Chicago Bulls in exchange for Jimmy Butler and the rights to Justin Patton (the 16th pick in the 2017 NBA draft).

On January 13, 2018, in his first game in 11 months, LaVine scored 14 points in the Bulls' 107–105 win over the Detroit Pistons. On February 9, he scored a season-high 35 points in a 114–113 win over his former team the Minnesota Timberwolves.

On July 6, 2018, the restricted free agent LaVine received a four-year, $80 million offer sheet from the Sacramento Kings. Two days later, the Bulls exercised their right of first refusal and matched the offer sheet extended to LaVine by the Kings. LaVine scored at least 30 points in each of the Bulls' first three games of the season, becoming the third Chicago player to do so, joining Michael Jordan (1986) and Bob Love (1971). On October 24, he made two free throws with 0.5 seconds left to lift the Bulls to a 112–110 win over the Charlotte Hornets. He finished with 32 points for his fourth straight 30-point game to start the season. On November 5, he scored a then-career-high 41 points, including the game-winning free throw with 0.2 seconds left, as the Bulls beat the New York Knicks 116–115 in double overtime. On November 10, he scored 24 points in a 99–98 win over the Cleveland Cavaliers, thus scoring 20 or more points in each of Chicago's 13 games to begin the season and in a career-high 14 straight overall, dating to his final game of 2017–18. The last Bulls player to score 20-plus points in 14 consecutive games was Jimmy Butler, who did it 15 straight times in 2016. He scored 26 points against the Dallas Mavericks on November 12 for 15 straight, before a 10-point game on November 14 against the Boston Celtics ended the streak. On December 26, after missing five games with a sprained left ankle, LaVine had 28 points in 26 minutes off the bench in a 119–94 loss to the Timberwolves.

On February 23, 2019, he scored a then-career-high 42 points in a 126–116 win over the Celtics. On March 1, he scored 47 points in a 168–161 quadruple-overtime win over the Atlanta Hawks, the third-highest-scoring game in NBA history. On March 6, he scored 39 points and hit the go-ahead layup in the closing seconds to lift the Bulls to a 108–107 win over the Philadelphia 76ers. LaVine missed the end of the season with right leg injuries. He led the Bulls in points scored in the season with 1,492 points while playing in only 63 games.

In the second game of the 2019–20 season, LaVine scored 37 points in a 110–102 win against the Memphis Grizzlies. On November 16, 2019, Lavine scored 36 points in a loss to the Brooklyn Nets. On November 23, LaVine scored a then-career-high 49 points, with 13 three-point field goals, including the game-winning three-pointer to defeat the Charlotte Hornets 116–115. On November 27, he had 36 points against Golden State. On January 25, 2020, LaVine recorded 44 points, ten rebounds and eight assists in a 118–106 win over the Cleveland Cavaliers. On February 11, he scored 41 points on 15-of-21 shooting, including 8 three-pointers, to go with nine rebounds, in a 126–114 loss to the Washington Wizards. On February 25, 2020, LaVine again scored 41 points in a 124–122 loss to the Oklahoma City Thunder. He was the leading scorer in 42 of the 65 games played in the shortened season.

==== 2020–2025: First All-Star selections and playoff appearance ====
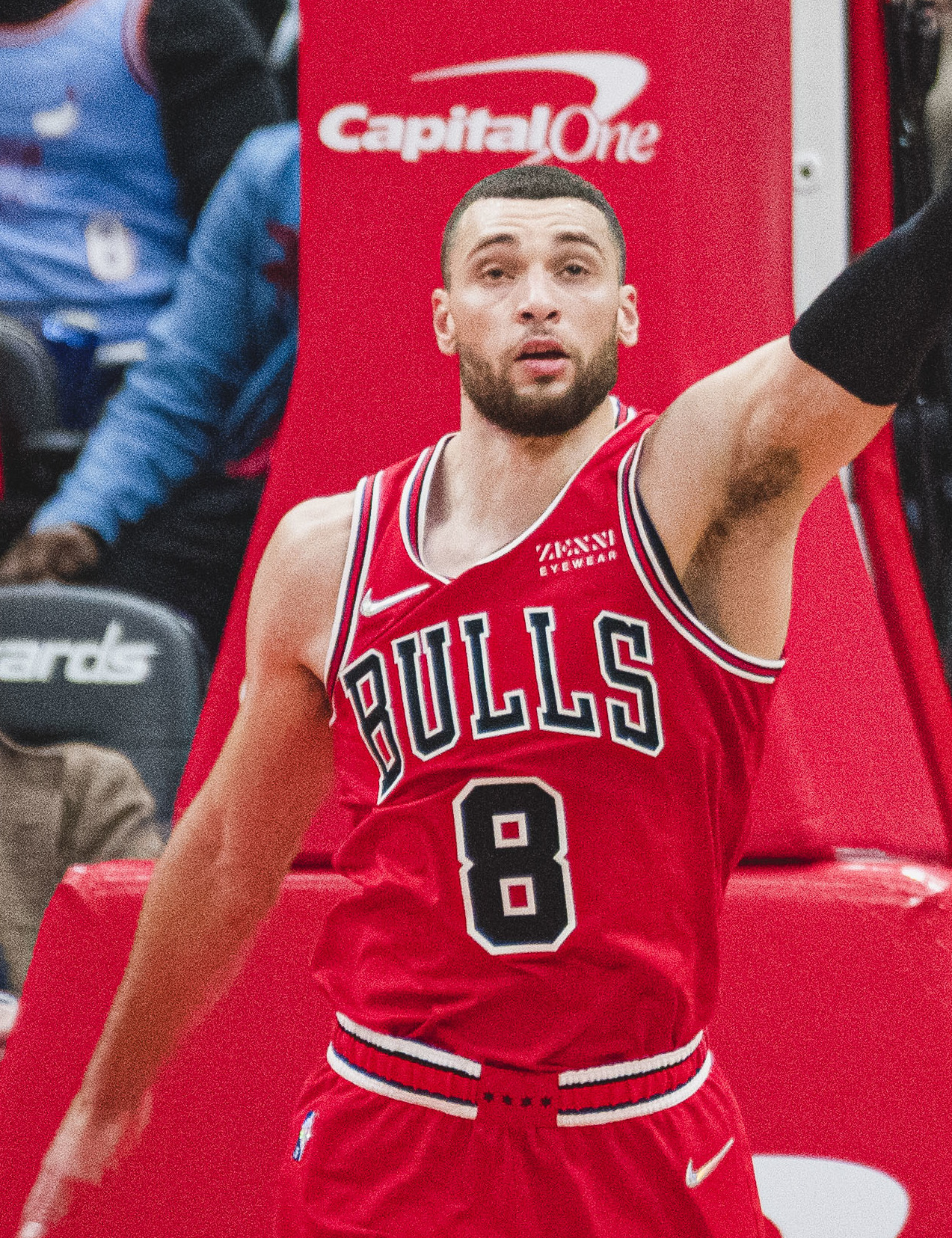
LaVine with the Chicago Bulls in 2022

On February 10, LaVine scored a season-high 46 points with nine 3-pointers in a 129–116 victory over the New Orleans Pelicans. With a new head coach in Billy Donovan and averaging career highs in scoring and shooting efficiency, on February 24, 2021, he was named a reserve for the 2021 NBA All-Star Game. It was his first All-Star selection and the first Bulls player selected since Jimmy Butler in 2017. In the 34th game of the season, LaVine had his 17th game scoring 30 points or more. On March 7, he played 28 minutes and scored 13 points during the All-Star game. On April 9, LaVine scored 39 of his then-career-high 50 points in the first half in a 120–108 loss to the Atlanta Hawks. For the season, he averaged a career-high 27.4 points per game, which ranked seventh in the NBA. He also reached career highs in rebounds (5.0), assists (4.9), 3-point shooting (41.9%), overall field goal percentage (50.7%) and free throw percentage (84.9%).

On November 19, 2021, LaVine scored a season-high 36 points in a 114–108 road victory over the Denver Nuggets. On February 3, he was named a reserve for the 2022 NBA All-Star Game. He dealt with a troublesome knee during the season and missed 15 games, yet still appeared in his most games since his ACL tear in 2017. The Bulls were playoff-eligible for the first time since 2017, giving LaVine his first career postseason appearance after eight seasons in the league. On April 24, during Game 4 of the first round of the playoffs, he posted 24 points, 5 rebounds and 13 assists in a 95–119 loss against the reigning champions Milwaukee Bucks. The Bulls would go on to lose to the Bucks in five games. On May 24, LaVine underwent left knee surgery. On July 7, LaVine re-signed with the Bulls with a new five-year max contract.

On December 4, 2022, LaVine recorded 41 points, eight rebounds and four steals in a 110–101 loss against the Sacramento Kings. On December 30, LaVine scored a season-high 43 points on 15-of-20 shooting from the field, along with six assists, in a 132–118 win over the Detroit Pistons. On January 6, 2023, LaVine scored 41 points on 14-of-19 shooting from the field and 11 of 13 from beyond the three-point line in a 126–112 win over the Philadelphia 76ers. That was his fourth career game with at least 40 points on 70% shooting, breaking a tie with Scottie Pippen for the second most in Bulls history. On March 17, LaVine put up 39 points, while DeMar DeRozan put up 49 points, in a 139–131 win over the Minnesota Timberwolves. Their 88 combined points surpassed Michael Jordan and Horace Grant's previous record of 85, to become the most points scored in a game by a duo in Bulls history.

On October 28, 2023, LaVine put up a career-high 51 points in a 118–102 loss to the Detroit Pistons. In February 2024, the Chicago Bulls announced that LaVine would undergo season-ending surgery on his right foot as a next step in his recovery process.

On November 29, 2024, LaVine put up 29 points in a 138–129 loss to the Boston Celtics. He also achieved 1,051 three-pointers made as a Bull, surpassing Kirk Hinrich as the all-time leader in three-pointers made in Bulls franchise history.

=== Sacramento Kings (2025–present) ===
On February 3, 2025, LaVine, Sidy Cissoko, three first-round draft picks and three second-round draft picks, were traded to the Sacramento Kings in a three-team trade also involving the San Antonio Spurs. On February 24, LaVine scored a season-high 42 points on 16-of-19 shooting and 8 for 9 from three-point range in a 130–88 win over the Charlotte Hornets.

LaVine made 39 appearances (36 starts) for Sacramento during the 2025–26 season, averaging 19.2 points, 2.8 rebounds and 2.3 assists. On February 13, 2026, it was announced that LaVine would require season-ending surgery to repair a tendon injury in his right hand.

== National team career ==
Lavine was selected as one of the players on Team USA at the 2020 Summer Olympics in Tokyo, Japan, which was postponed to 2021 due to the novel coronavirus COVID-19 global pandemic. He started one game and played primarily as the team's sixth man, averaging 10.6 points per game. Prior to the gold medal game, he was second in assists, playing solid defense and was shooting a team-best 47% from three-point range. LaVine and Team USA won the Olympic gold medal in men's basketball.

== Career statistics ==
Legend
GP	Games played	GS	Games started	MPG	Minutes per game
FG%	Field goal percentage	3P%	3-point field goal percentage	FT%	Free throw percentage
RPG	Rebounds per game	APG	Assists per game	SPG	Steals per game
BPG	Blocks per game	PPG	Points per game	**Bold**	Career high
*	Led the league

=== NBA ===
==== Regular season ====
Year	Team	GP	GS	MPG	FG%	3P%	FT%	RPG	APG	SPG	BPG	PPG
2014–15	Minnesota	77	40	24.7	.422	.341	842	2.8	3.6	.7	.1	10.1
2015–16	Minnesota	**82***	33	28.0	.452	.389	.793	2.8	3.1	.8	.2	14.0
2016–17	Minnesota	47	47	**37.2**	.459	.387	.836	3.4	3.0	.9	.2	18.9
2017–18	Chicago	24	24	27.3	.383	.341	.813	3.9	3.0	1.0	.2	16.7
2018–19	Chicago	63	62	34.5	.467	.374	.832	4.7	4.5	1.0	.4	23.7
2019–20	Chicago	60	60	34.8	.450	.380	.802	4.8	4.2	**1.5**	**.5**	25.5
2020–21	Chicago	58	58	35.1	.507	.419	.849	5.0	**4.9**	.8	**.5**	**27.4**
2021–22	Chicago	67	67	34.7	.476	.389	.853	4.6	4.5	.6	.3	24.4
2022–23	Chicago	77	**77**	35.9	.485	.375	.848	4.5	4.2	.9	.2	24.8
2023–24	Chicago	25	23	34.9	.452	.349	.854	**5.2**	3.9	.8	.3	19.5
2024–25	Chicago	42	42	34.1	**.511**	**.446**	.797	4.8	4.5	.9	.2	24.0
2024–25	Sacramento	32	32	36.6	**.511**	**.446**	.874	3.5	3.8	.6	.1	22.4
2025–26	Sacramento	39	37	31.4	.479	.390	**.880**	2.8	2.3	.7	.3	19.2
Career		693	602	32.7	.470	.391	.835	4.0	3.9	.9	.3	20.7
All-Star		2	0	19.5	.588	.400	.500	3.5	3.0	1.5	.0	12.5

==== Playoffs ====
Year	Team	GP	GS	MPG	FG%	3P%	FT%	RPG	APG	SPG	BPG	PPG
2022	Chicago	4	4	38.3	.429	.375	.933	5.3	6.0	.8	.3	19.3
Career		4	4	38.3	.429	.375	.933	5.3	6.0	.8	.3	19.3

=== College ===
Year	Team	GP	GS	MPG	FG%	3P%	FT%	RPG	APG	SPG	BPG	PPG
2013–14	UCLA	37	1	24.4	.441	.375	.691	2.5	1.8	.9	.2	9.4

== Personal life ==
In March 2016, LaVine guest-starred in an episode of the Disney XD television series Kirby Buckets.

In April 2020, LaVine became engaged to his longtime girlfriend. Their first child, Saint Thomas LaVine, was born in August 2022.

== See also ==
- List of NBA career 3-point scoring leaders
- List of NBA single-game 3-point scoring leaders
