= Damian Cotter =

Australian basketball coach (born 1971)

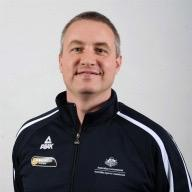

Chicago Bulls
- Position: Assistant coach
- League: NBA

Career information
- College: Sydney
- Coaching career: 2000–present

Career history

Coaching
- 2000–2007: Knox Basketball Incorporated
- 2007–2014: New South Wales Institute of Sport
- 2013–2014: Sydney Kings (assistant)
- 2014–2015: Sydney Kings
- 2017–2018: Long Island Nets (assistant)
- 2018–2019: Capital City Go-Go (assistant)
- 2019–2020: Windy City Bulls
- 2020–present: Chicago Bulls (assistant)

Damian James Cotter (born 1971) is an Australian basketball coach who currently serves as an assistant coach for the Chicago Bulls of the NBA.

== Coaching career ==
Cotter's coaching career began in 1999 with the Knox Basketball Incorporated as a director of coaching (1999–2007) and head coach (2000–2007). From 2006 to 2009, Cotter was the assistant coach to the Australian Development Team, head coach of the under 18 NSW Metropolitan State team and assistant coach to the Australian Emus, who named him as their head coach in 2009. Cotter led the Emus to the 2007, 2009, 2011 and 2013 World Championships, finishing between 5th, 4th and 6th positions, respectively. He also won the gold medal at the prestigious 2010 Albert Schweitzer Tournament (Germany).

From 2013 to 2014, he was the assistant coach of the NBL team Sydney Kings and head coach to the NSW Institute of Sport Basketball Program, where he was responsible for the identification and development of both male and female players in the state of New South Wales. This program produced 22 Australian representatives between 2009 and 2014.

Cotter was named Sydney Kings' head coach for the 2014-15 NBL season.

Before the 2017–18 season, the Brooklyn Nets added Cotter to the Long Island Nets coaching staff as assistant coach.

Cotter was hired as head coach of the Windy City Bulls of the NBA G League for the 2019–20 season.

On November 14, 2020, the Chicago Bulls announced Cotter would be joining Billy Donovan's staff as an assistant coach.

== International coaching career ==
Cotter has trained numerous Australian teams for World Championships and Basketball Competitions in China (FIBA Stanković Cup).

From 2013 to 2016, he was the assistant coach of the Australian Opals, finishing 3rd place at the 2014 World Championships and 5th place at the 2016 Olympic Games.

In 2016, he served as a consultant for the Sri Lankan Basketball Federation, helping both the National Senior Women and Male teams prepare for the South Asia Games.

== Professional international clinics ==
Cotter has conducted coaching and players clinics on an international and national level, including:

- 2006 - Player clinics in Singapore in conjunction with the national basketball federation.
- 2006, 2011, 2012 - Coaching camps for national senior and junior programs for male & female in behalf of the Sri Lankan Basketball Federation (Sri Lanka)
- 2010 - Coaching and player clinics in South Australia, NSW and Victoria working with the state governing bodies.
- 2010, 2009 - Clinic for coaches in Mannheim, Germany and Strasbourg, France in conjunction with the respective national basketball federations.
- 2011 - Coaching clinics on behalf of Alsace Basketball Federation in conjunction with the French National Basketball Federation (Alsace, France)
- 2011 - Coaching clinics on behalf of the German Basketball Federation at the Bambers Super Cup (Berlin, Germany)
- 2012 - Coaching clinics on behalf of the Munich Basketball Association (Munich, Germany)
- 2012 - Coaches clinics in behalf of FIBA Europe and the Romania Basketball Federation (Bucharest, Romania)

== Recognition and awards ==
Coach of the Year Nominee (NSW Sports Federation)	2013
Albert Schweitzer Tournament (World Championship)	2010
Coach of the Year Nominee (NSW Institute of Sport)	2010
Coach of the Year Winner (NSW Sports Federation)	2009
