= List of career achievements by Magic Johnson =

This page details the career achievements of Basketball Hall of Famer Magic Johnson. He is a member of NBA's 50th Anniversary All-Time Team and is widely considered to be the greatest point guard of all time.

== Career highlights ==
- One of several players in NBA history to average at least 22.5 points, 12 assists and 6 rebounds for a season
  - He accomplished the feat twice, in 1987 and 1989
- One of five players in NBA history to win NCAA and NBA championships in consecutive years.
  - Includes Bill Russell, Henry Bibby, Christian Braun, and Billy Thompson
- One of six players in NBA history to record a triple-double in an NBA Finals clinching game (1982 and 1985).
  - Includes Larry Bird (1986), James Worthy (1988), Tim Duncan (2003), LeBron James (2012 and 2016), and Draymond Green (2015)
- One of four players in NBA history to record a triple-double in their playoff debut.
  - Includes Johnny McCarthy, LeBron James and Nikola Jokić
- One of two players in NBA history to set 20+ assists in at least 30 games: achieved it 32 times
  - Includes John Stockton, who achieved it 38 times
- Only player in NBA history to win the NBA Finals Most Valuable Player Award in his rookie season

== Regular season ==
- 3× NBA Most Valuable Player (1987, 1989, 1990)
- 4× NBA annual assists leaders 1983, 1984, 1986, 1987
- 2× NBA annual steals leaders 1981, 1982
- 1× NBA annual free throw percentage leaders 1988–89
- 9× All-NBA First Team (1983 to 1991)
- 1× All-NBA Second Team (1982)
- All-Rookie first team (1980)

== NBA All-Star Game ==
- 2× NBA All-Star Game MVP (1990, 1992)
- 12× NBA All-Star (1980, 1982–1992)

== NBA Playoffs ==
- 5x NBA Playoffs assists leader (1980, 1984–87)
- 9x NBA Playoffs total assists leader (1980, 1983–89, 1991)
- 2x NBA Playoffs steals leader (1980, 1982)
- 2x NBA Playoffs total steals leader (1980, 1983)
- 1x NBA Playoffs minutes played leader (1983)
- 3x NBA Playoffs total minutes played leader (1983, 1988, 1991)
- Led the 1991 NBA Playoffs in total minutes played, three points made, free throws made, defensive rebounds and assists

== NBA Finals ==
- 3x NBA Finals MVP (1980, 1982, 1987)
- 5x NBA Champion (1980, 1982, 1985, 1987–88)
- 4x NBA runner-up (1983, 1984, 1989, 1991)
- 8x NBA Finals assists leader (1980, 1983–85, 1987–89, 1991)

== Los Angeles Lakers ==
- Los Angeles Lakers #32 retired
- Selected as the first overall pick in the 1979 NBA draft

== NBA records ==
=== Career ===
- Holds the all-time record for highest career assists-per-game average—11.2
- Holds the all-time record for most assists in Playoffs—2,346
  - Johnson is also the only player in NBA history to have at least 2,000 assists in a playoff career
- Holds the all-time record for highest assists-per-game average in Playoffs—12.4
- Holds the all-time record for most triple-doubles in Playoffs—30

=== All-Star Game ===
- Holds the all-time record for most assists in a game w/o OT—19 (1988)
- Holds the all-time record for most assists in a half—13 (1984)

=== Playoffs ===
- Holds single-series playoff record for highest assists-per-game average—15.2 (1985)
- Shares single-game playoff record for most assists made in a game—24 (May 15, 1984, vs. Phoenix Suns)
- Shares single-game playoff record for most assists made in a half—15 (May 3, 1985, vs. Portland)
- Shares single-game playoff record for most free throws made in one half—19 (May 8, 1991, vs. Golden State)

=== Finals ===
- Holds the single-series record for highest assists-per-game average—14.0 (1985)
- Shares the single-series record for most triple-doubles—2 (1985)
- Holds the record for most points by a rookie, game—42 (May 16, 1980, vs. Philadelphia)
- Holds the record for most assists by a rookie, game—11 (May 7, 1980, vs. Philadelphia)
- Holds the record for most assists made in a game—21 (June 3, 1984, vs. Boston Celtics)
- Holds the record for most assists in one half—14 (June 19, 1988, vs. Detroit)
- Holds the record for most assists in one quarter—8 (four times)

=== Los Angeles Lakers ===
- Most assists, total: 10,141
- Highest assists-per-game average, career: 11.2
- Highest assists-per-game average in a season: 13.1
- Most assists in a season: 989
- Most assists in a game: 24
- Most steals in a season: 208
- Highest steals-per-game average in a season: 3.43
- Most triple-doubles: 138
- Highest free-throw percentage in a season: .911
- 3rd most playoff games played: 190
- 2nd most playoff minutes played: 7,538
- 4th most playoff points scored: 3,701
- 3rd most playoff free throws made: 1,068
- 5th most playoff field goals attempted: 2,522
- 5th most playoff rebounds grabbed: 1,465
- 3rd most playoff offensive rebounds: 349
- Most playoff defensive rebounds: 1,116
- Most playoff assists: 2,346
- Most playoff steals: 359

== Others ==
=== Game-winning shots ===
Time (sec) left	Score	Opponent	Date
6.0	112-110	Phoenix Suns	November 2, 1979
1.0	120-118	Golden State Warriors	March 22, 1981
1:05	99-97	Phoenix Suns	May 25, 1984
3.0	112-111	Golden State Warriors	March 6, 1986
1.0	113-111	Sacramento Kings	November 16, 1986
2.0	107-106	Boston Celtics	June 9, 1987
0.0	115-114	Boston Celtics	December 11, 1987
0.0	148-146 2OT	Denver Nuggets	November 15, 1988
0.0	118-116	Phoenix Suns	March 26, 1989
19.0	104-102	Sacramento Kings	December 26, 1989
0.8	102-101	Seattle SuperSonics	April 17, 1990

=== 40-point games ===
Points made	Score	Opponent	Date
42	123-107	Philadelphia 76ers	May 16, 1980
41	110-112 OT	Utah Jazz	March 28, 1981
40	130-127	Detroit Pistons	January 9, 1982
46	127-117 OT	Sacramento Kings	December 23, 1986
42	126-115	New Jersey Nets	January 19, 1987
40	113-108	Indiana Pacers	February 13, 1987
40	110-106	Seattle SuperSonics	November 30, 1988
43	101-114	Phoenix Suns	May 13, 1990
43	103-106	Phoenix Suns	May 15, 1990
44	124-125	Golden State Warriors	May 8, 1991

=== USA Basketball ===
- A member of The Dream Team, which is considered to be the best Basketball team ever assembled
- 1992 Olympic Gold Medalist

=== College basketball achievements ===
- Member of NCAA championship team (1979)
- NCAA Division I Tournament Most Outstanding Player (1979)
- The Sporting News All-America first team (1979)

=== Other achievements ===
- J. Walter Kennedy Citizenship Award (1992)
- Grammy Award for Best Spoken Album (What You Can Do to Avoid AIDS) (1993)
