= List of NBA annual free throw percentage leaders =

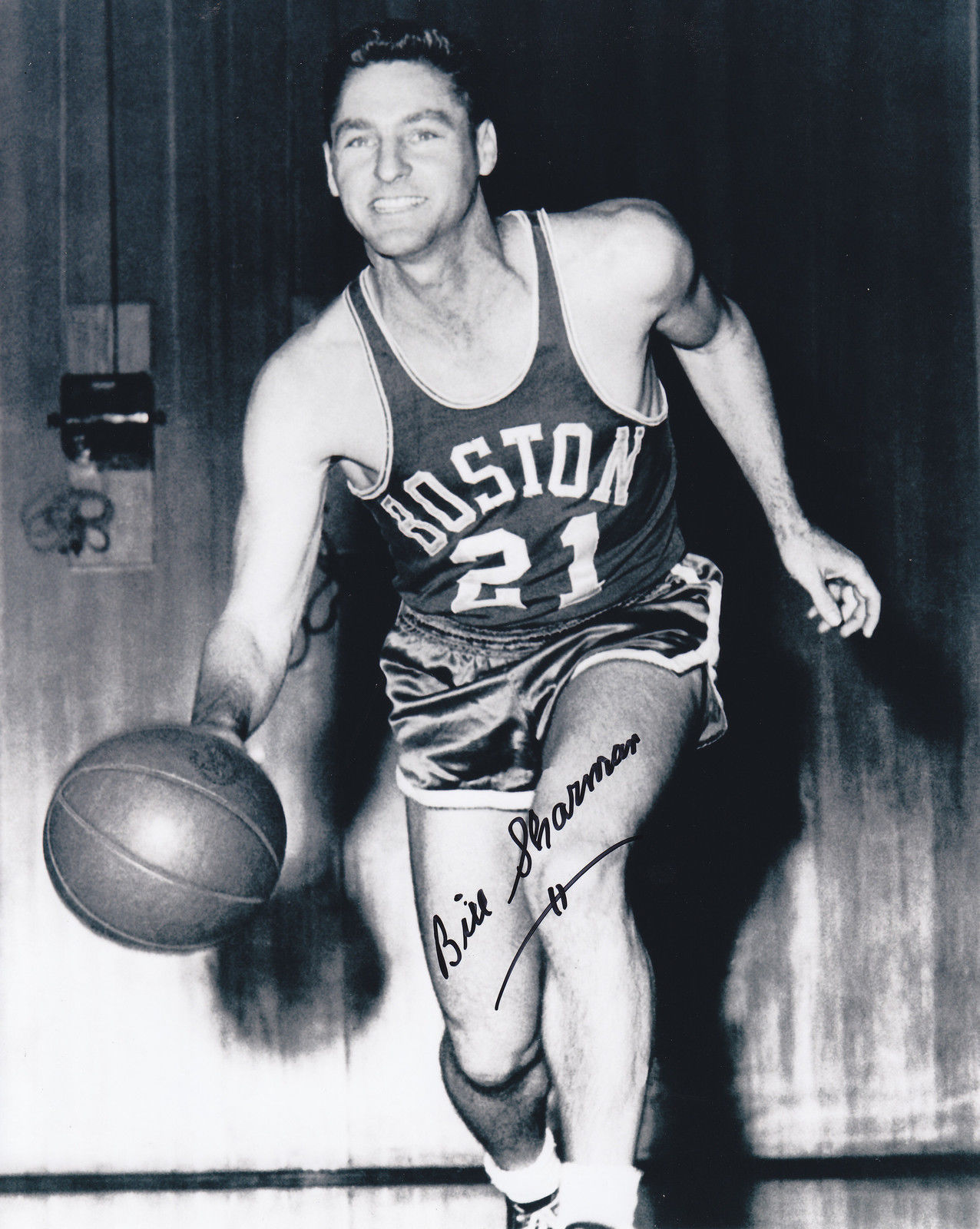
Bill Sharman led the league in free throw percentage in seven of his 11 seasons in the NBA.

In basketball, a free throw is an unopposed attempt to score points from behind the free throw line. The National Basketball Association's (NBA) free throw percentage leader is the player with the highest free throw percentage in a given season. To qualify as a free throw percentage leader, the player must have at least 125 free throws made. Aside from the strike shortened 1998–99 NBA season and 2011–12 NBA season, this has been the entry criteria since the 1974–75 NBA season.

José Calderón holds the record for best free throw percentage in a season, which he accomplished with the Toronto Raptors in the 2008–09 NBA season with 98.05%, missing only 3 free throws that season making 151 of his 154 total free throw attempts.

Bill Sharman has led the league in free throw percentage a record seven times. Rick Barry has led the league six times, while Reggie Miller and Stephen Curry have each done it five times. Larry Bird has led the league six times. Mark Price and Dolph Schayes have each done it three times. Mahmoud Abdul-Rauf, Larry Costello, Ernie DiGregorio, Bob Feerick, Kyle Macy, Calvin Murphy, Steve Nash, Oscar Robertson, Larry Siegfried and Peja Stojaković have each done it two times.

== Key ==
^		Denotes player who is still active in the NBA			
*		Inducted into the Naismith Memorial Basketball Hall of Fame			
†		Not yet eligible for Hall of Fame consideration (Note: A player is not eligible for induction into the Naismith Memorial Basketball Hall of Fame until he has been fully retired for two calendar years.)			
Player (X)		Denotes the number of times the player had been the free throw percentage leader up to and including that season			
G	Guard	F	Forward	C	Center

== Annual leaders ==
Season	Player	Position (Note: The player's primary position is listed first.)	Team	Games played	Free throws made	Free throws attempted	Free throw %	Ref.
1946–47	Fred Scolari	G	Washington Capitols	58	146	180	81.11	
1947–48	Bob Feerick	F/G	Washington Capitols	48	189	240	78.75	
1948–49	Bob Feerick (2)	F/G	Washington Capitols	58	256	298	85.91	
1949–50	Max Zaslofsky	G/F	Chicago Stags	68	321	381	84.25	
1950–51	Joe Fulks*	F	Philadelphia Warriors	66	378	442	85.52	
1951–52	Bobby Wanzer*	G	Rochester Royals	66	377	417	90.41	
1952–53	Bill Sharman*	G	Boston Celtics	71	341	401	85.04	
1953–54	Bill Sharman* (2)	G	Boston Celtics	72	331	392	84.44	
1954–55	Bill Sharman* (3)	G	Boston Celtics	68	347	387	89.66	
1955–56	Bill Sharman* (4)	G	Boston Celtics	72	358	413	86.68	
1956–57	Bill Sharman* (5)	G	Boston Celtics	67	381	421	90.50	
1957–58	Dolph Schayes*	F/C	Syracuse Nationals	72	629	696	90.37	
1958–59	Bill Sharman* (6)	G	Boston Celtics	72	342	367	93.19	
1959–60	Dolph Schayes* (2)	F/C	Syracuse Nationals	75	533	597	89.28	
1960–61	Bill Sharman* (7)	G	Boston Celtics	61	210	228	92.11	
1961–62	Dolph Schayes* (3) (Note: Dolph Schayes became the first and as of 2019–20 NBA season, only center to win the free throw percentage title for the third time.)	F/C	Syracuse Nationals	56	286	319	89.66	
1962–63	Larry Costello	G	Syracuse Nationals	78	288	327	88.07	
1963–64	Oscar Robertson*	G	Cincinnati Royals	79	800	938	85.29	
1964–65	Larry Costello (2)	G	Philadelphia 76ers	64	243	277	87.73	
1965–66	Larry Siegfried	F	Boston Celtics	71	274	311	88.10	
1966–67	Adrian Smith	G	Cincinnati Royals	81	343	380	90.26	
1967–68	Oscar Robertson* (2)	G	Cincinnati Royals	65	576	660	87.27	
1968–69	Larry Siegfried (2)	F	Boston Celtics	79	336	389	86.38	
1969–70	Flynn Robinson	G	Milwaukee Bucks	81	439	489	89.78	
1970–71	Chet Walker*	F/G	Chicago Bulls	81	480	559	85.87	
1971–72	Jack Marin	F/G	Baltimore Bullets	78	356	398	89.45	
1972–73	Rick Barry*	F	Golden State Warriors	82	358	397	90.18	
1973–74	Ernie DiGregorio	G	Buffalo Braves	81	174	193	90.16	
1974–75	Rick Barry* (2)	F	Golden State Warriors	80	394	436	90.37	
1975–76	Rick Barry* (3)	F	Golden State Warriors	81	287	311	92.28	
1976–77	Ernie DiGregorio (2)	G	Buffalo Braves	81	138	146	94.52	
1977–78	Rick Barry* (4)	F	Golden State Warriors	82	378	409	92.42	
1978–79	Rick Barry* (5)	F	Houston Rockets	80	160	169	94.67	
1979–80	Rick Barry* (6)	F	Houston Rockets	72	143	153	93.46	
1980–81	Calvin Murphy*	G	Houston Rockets	76	206	215	95.81	
1981–82	Kyle Macy	G	Phoenix Suns	82	152	169	89.94	
1982–83	Calvin Murphy* (2)	G	Houston Rockets	64	138	150	92.00	
1983–84	Larry Bird*	F	Boston Celtics	79	374	421	88.84	
1984–85	Kyle Macy (2)	G	Phoenix Suns	65	127	140	90.71	
1985–86	Larry Bird* (2)	F	Boston Celtics	82	441	492	89.63	
1986–87	Larry Bird* (3)	F	Boston Celtics	74	414	455	90.99	
1987–88	Jack Sikma	C/F	Milwaukee Bucks	82	321	348	92.24	
1988–89	Magic Johnson*	G	Los Angeles Lakers	77	513	563	91.12	
1989–90	Larry Bird* (4)	F	Boston Celtics	75	319	343	93.00	
1990–91	Reggie Miller*	G	Indiana Pacers	82	551	600	91.83	
1991–92	Mark Price	G	Cleveland Cavaliers	72	270	285	94.74	
1992–93	Mark Price (2)	G	Cleveland Cavaliers	75	289	305	94.75	
1993–94	Mahmoud Abdul-Rauf	G	Denver Nuggets	80	219	229	95.63	
1994–95	Spud Webb	G	Sacramento Kings	76	226	242	93.39	
1995–96	Mahmoud Abdul-Rauf (2)	G	Denver Nuggets	57	146	157	92.99	
1996–97	Mark Price (3)	G	Golden State Warriors	70	155	171	90.64	
1997–98	Chris Mullin*	G	Indiana Pacers	82	154	164	93.90	
1998–99 (Note: The 1998–99 NBA season was shortened to 50 games due to the league's lockout. The qualification of this season's free throw percentage leader is to have at least 76 free throws made.)	Reggie Miller* (2)	G	Indiana Pacers	50	226	247	91.50	
1999–00	Jeff Hornacek	G	Utah Jazz	77	171	180	95.00	
2000–01	Reggie Miller* (3)	G	Indiana Pacers	81	323	348	92.82	
2001–02	Reggie Miller* (4)	G	Indiana Pacers	79	296	325	91.08	
2002–03	Allan Houston	G	New York Knicks	82	363	395	91.90	
2003–04	Peja Stojaković	F	Sacramento Kings	81	394	425	92.71	
2004–05	Reggie Miller* (5)	G	Indiana Pacers	66	250	268	93.28	
2005–06	Steve Nash*	G	Phoenix Suns	79	257	279	92.11	
2006–07	Kyle Korver	G/F	Philadelphia 76ers	74	191	209	91.39	
2007–08	Peja Stojaković (2)	F	New Orleans Hornets	77	130	140	92.86	
2008–09	José Calderón	G	Toronto Raptors	68	151	154	98.05	
2009–10	Steve Nash* (2)	G	Phoenix Suns	81	211	225	93.78	
2010–11	Stephen Curry^	G	Golden State Warriors	74	212	227	93.39	
2011–12 (Note: The 2011–12 NBA season was shortened to 66 games due to the league's lockout. The qualification of this season's free throw percentage leader is to have at least 100 free throws made.)	Jamal Crawford	G	Portland Trail Blazers	60	191	206	92.72	
2012–13	Kevin Durant^	F	Oklahoma City Thunder	81	679	750	90.53	
2013–14	Brian Roberts	G	New Orleans Pelicans	72	125	133	93.98	
2014–15	Stephen Curry^ (2)	G	Golden State Warriors	80	308	337	91.39	
2015–16	Stephen Curry^ (3)	G	Golden State Warriors	79	363	400	90.75	
2016–17	CJ McCollum^	G	Portland Trail Blazers	80	268	294	91.16	
2017–18	Stephen Curry^ (4)	G	Golden State Warriors	51	278	302	92.05	
2018–19	Malcolm Brogdon	G	Milwaukee Bucks	64	141	152	92.76	
2019–20	Brad Wanamaker	G	Boston Celtics	71	126	136	92.65	
2020–21	Chris Paul^{†}	G	Phoenix Suns	70	169	181	93.37	
2021–22	Jordan Poole^	G	Golden State Warriors	76	246	266	92.48	
2022–23	Tyler Herro^	G	Miami Heat	67	170	182	93.41	
2023–24	Klay Thompson^	G	Golden State Warriors	77	127	137	92.70	
2024–25	Stephen Curry^ (5)	G	Golden State Warriors	51	279	299	93.31	
2025–26	Cam Spencer^	G	Memphis Grizzlies	72	126	134	94.03	

== Multiple-time leaders ==
Rank	Player	Team	Times leader	Years
1	Bill Sharman	Boston Celtics	7	1953, 1954, 1955, 1956, 1957, 1959, 1961
2	Rick Barry	Golden State Warriors (4) / Houston Rockets (2)	6	1973, 1975, 1976, 1978, 1979, 1980
3	Stephen Curry	Golden State Warriors	5	2011, 2015, 2016, 2018, 2025
3	Reggie Miller	Indiana Pacers	5	1991, 1999, 2001, 2002, 2005
5	Larry Bird	Boston Celtics	4	1984, 1986, 1987, 1990
6	Mark Price	Cleveland Cavaliers (2) / Golden State Warriors (1)	3	1992, 1993, 1997
6	Dolph Schayes	Syracuse Nationals	3	1958, 1960, 1962
8	Mahmoud Abdul-Rauf	Denver Nuggets	2	1994, 1996
8	Larry Costello	Syracuse Nationals (1) / Philadelphia 76ers (1)	2	1963, 1965
8	Ernie DiGregorio	Buffalo Braves	2	1974, 1977
8	Bob Feerick	Washington Capitols	2	1948, 1949
8	Kyle Macy	Phoenix Suns	2	1982, 1985
8	Calvin Murphy	Houston Rockets	2	1981, 1983
8	Steve Nash	Phoenix Suns	2	2006, 2007
8	Oscar Robertson	Cincinnati Royals	2	1964, 1968
8	Larry Siegfried	Boston Celtics	2	1966, 1969
8	Peja Stojaković	Sacramento Kings (1) / New Orleans Hornets (1)	2	2004, 2008

== See also ==
- NBA records
- List of NBA career free throw percentage leaders
- List of NBA career free throw scoring leaders
- List of NBA annual 3-point field goal percentage leaders
- List of NBA annual field goal percentage leaders
- List of NBA annual scoring leaders
- List of NBA annual 3-point scoring leaders
- List of NBA annual assists leaders
- List of NBA annual rebounding leaders
- List of NBA annual steals leaders
- List of NBA annual blocks leaders
