= Kyle Korver =

American basketball player (born 1981)

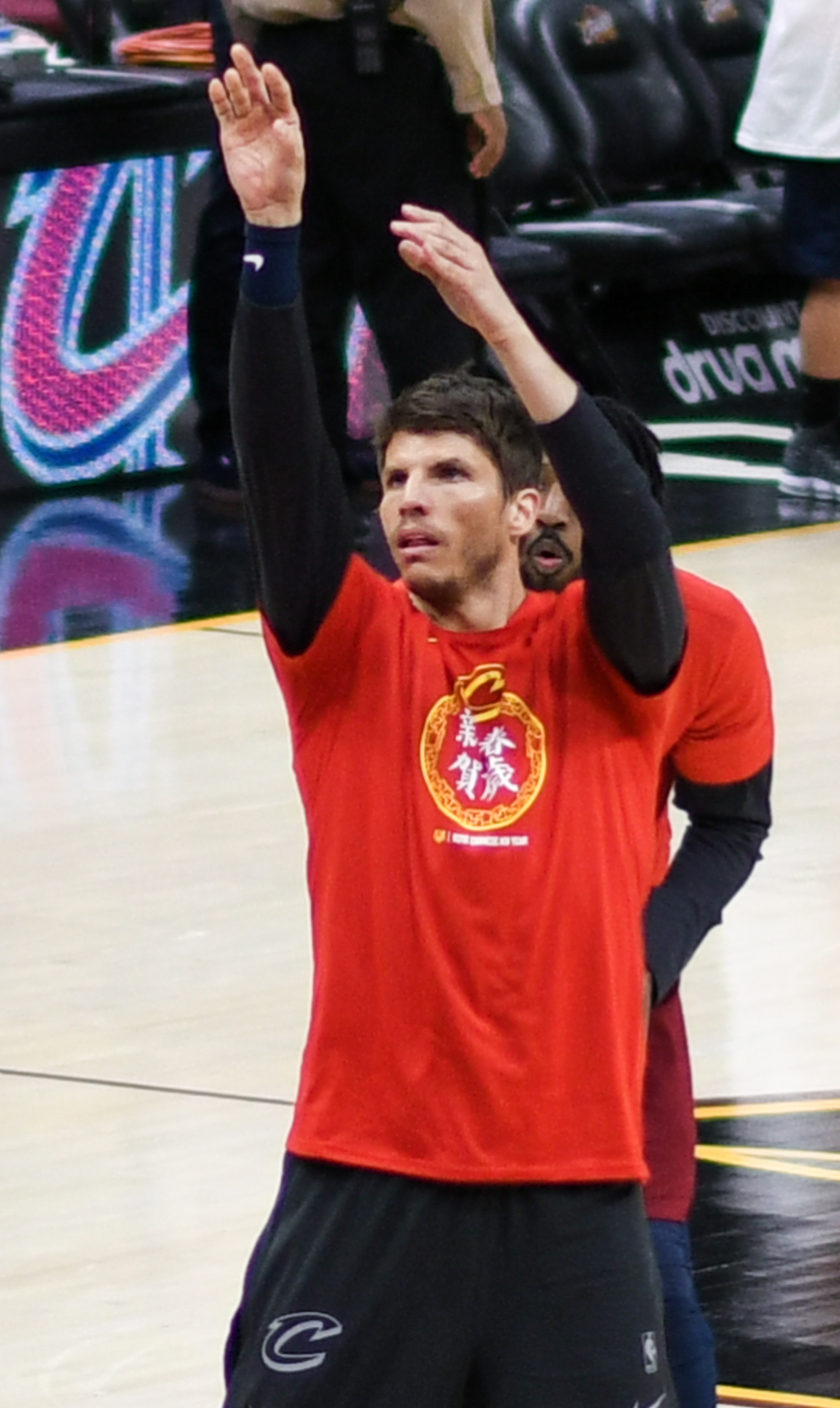
- Korver with the Cleveland Cavaliers in 2018

Personal information
- Born: March 17, 1981 (age 45) Lakewood, California, U.S.
- Listed height: 6 ft 7 in (2.01 m)
- Listed weight: 212 lb (96 kg)

Career information
- High school: Pella (Pella, Iowa)
- College: Creighton (1999–2003)
- NBA draft: 2003: 2nd round, 51st overall pick
- Drafted by: New Jersey Nets
- Playing career: 2003–2020
- Position: Shooting guard / small forward
- Number: 26
- Coaching career: 2021–2022

Career history

Playing
- 2003–2007: Philadelphia 76ers
- 2007–2010: Utah Jazz
- 2010–2012: Chicago Bulls
- 2012–2017: Atlanta Hawks
- 2017–2018: Cleveland Cavaliers
- 2018–2019: Utah Jazz
- 2019–2020: Milwaukee Bucks

Coaching
- 2021–2022: Brooklyn Nets (player development)

Career highlights
- NBA All-Star (2015); Consensus second-team All-American (2003); 2× MVC Player of the Year (2002, 2003); 2× First-team All-MVC (2002, 2003); Second-team All-MVC (2001); 2× MVC tournament MVP (2002, 2003); No. 25 retired by Creighton Bluejays

Career statistics
- Points: 11,953 (9.7 ppg)
- Rebounds: 3,643 (3.0 rpg)
- Assists: 2,114 (1.7 apg)
- Stats at NBA.com
- Stats at Basketball Reference

Kyle Elliot Korver (born March 17, 1981) is an American professional basketball executive and former player who was the assistant general manager for the Atlanta Hawks of the National Basketball Association (NBA). He played college basketball for the Creighton Bluejays. He is regarded as one of the best three-point shooters of all-time.

Korver was drafted in the second round of the 2003 NBA draft by the New Jersey Nets. He was immediately traded to the Philadelphia 76ers. After four and a half seasons in Philadelphia, he was traded to the Utah Jazz. During his first stint with the Jazz in 2009–10, Korver shot 53.6 percent from three-point range, which set an NBA single-season three-point field goal accuracy record. In 2010, he joined the Chicago Bulls. In 2012, he was traded to the Atlanta Hawks, where in 2015 he was named an NBA All-Star. In 2017, he was traded to the Cleveland Cavaliers, where he was a member of back-to-back Finals teams. In 2018, he was traded back to the Jazz. In 2019, he signed with the Milwaukee Bucks.

Korver ranks among the most prolific 3-point shooters in NBA history, ranking eighth all-time in 3-point field goals made and tenth all-time in 3-point field goal percentage. He is the only player to lead the NBA in three-point shooting percentage four times. Korver holds the Hawks and Jazz single-season three-point field goal percentage records and depending on the source/minimum threshold he is the Hawks career three-point percentage record-holder. He holds the NBA record for the highest three-point percentage (.536) in a season. On the list of All-time Top-50 NBA career 3-point scoring leaders, he has the highest three-point shooting percentage.

== Early life ==
Korver was born at the Lakewood Hospital, and is the oldest of four children of Kevin Korver, a pastor for the Third Reformed Church in Pella, Iowa, and Laine Korver. Both of his parents played basketball at Central College in Pella. His grandfather, Harold Korver, is also a pastor at the Emmanuel Reformed Church in Paramount, California. He grew up in the Los Angeles area and was a Los Angeles Lakers fan as a child. Watching Magic Johnson, Kareem Abdul-Jabbar, and the Showtime Lakers instilled a love of basketball in Korver that made him want to pursue it himself. He moved to Iowa in 1993 when his father accepted his current pastoral position. Korver graduated from Pella High School in 1999. In 2018, he and his three brothers were still in the top 10 in both career scoring and rebounding at Pella High.

== College career ==
As a freshman at Creighton in 1999–2000, Korver was named to the MVC's All-Bench team, All-Freshman team, and All-Newcomer team while averaging 8.8 points per game. He came off the bench in all but one game, hitting 43.4 percent of his three-pointers and 89.5 percent at the free-throw line.

As a sophomore in 2000–01, Korver earned second-team All-MVC honors while leading the league champion Jays with 14.6 points per game. He made a then-record 100 three-pointers while ranking 12th nationally with 45.2 percent accuracy from downtown. He was also named to the MVC All-Tournament team.

As a junior in 2001–02, Korver led Creighton in scoring (15.1), rebounding (5.5), assists (3.3) and steals (1.6) while earning MVC Player of the Year and honorable-mention All-America honors. He ranked 12th nationally in free throw percentage (89.0) and 41st in three-point percentage (42.9) while leading the Jays to MVC regular-season and Tournament titles.

As a senior in 2002–03, Korver became one of six players to repeat as MVC Player of the Year, joining Larry Bird, Hersey Hawkins, Xavier McDaniel, Lewis Lloyd, and Junior Bridgeman. He was a consensus All-American, including second-team honors from the Associated Press, ESPN.com, and the USBWA. Korver earned MVC tournament MVP honors for the second year in a row. In 34 games as a senior, he averaged 17.8 points, 6.4 rebounds, 3.1 assists and 1.5 steals in 31.8 minutes per game.

Korver finished his career at Creighton fourth all-time in scoring (1,801), first in three-pointers made (371), first in three-point attempts (819), first in three-point accuracy (45.3), first in free throw accuracy (89.1), eighth in assists (294), ninth in blocked shots (58) and fourth in steals (172). His 371 career made three-pointers is an MVC record and tied for sixth most in NCAA history. Korver also holds Creighton single-season records for three-pointers made (129), three-point percentage (.480), and free-throw percentage (.908).

Korver graduated with a bachelor's degree in visual communications. He returned to Creighton in May 2019 to deliver the keynote at the university's graduation ceremony.

== Professional career ==
=== Philadelphia 76ers (2003–2007) ===
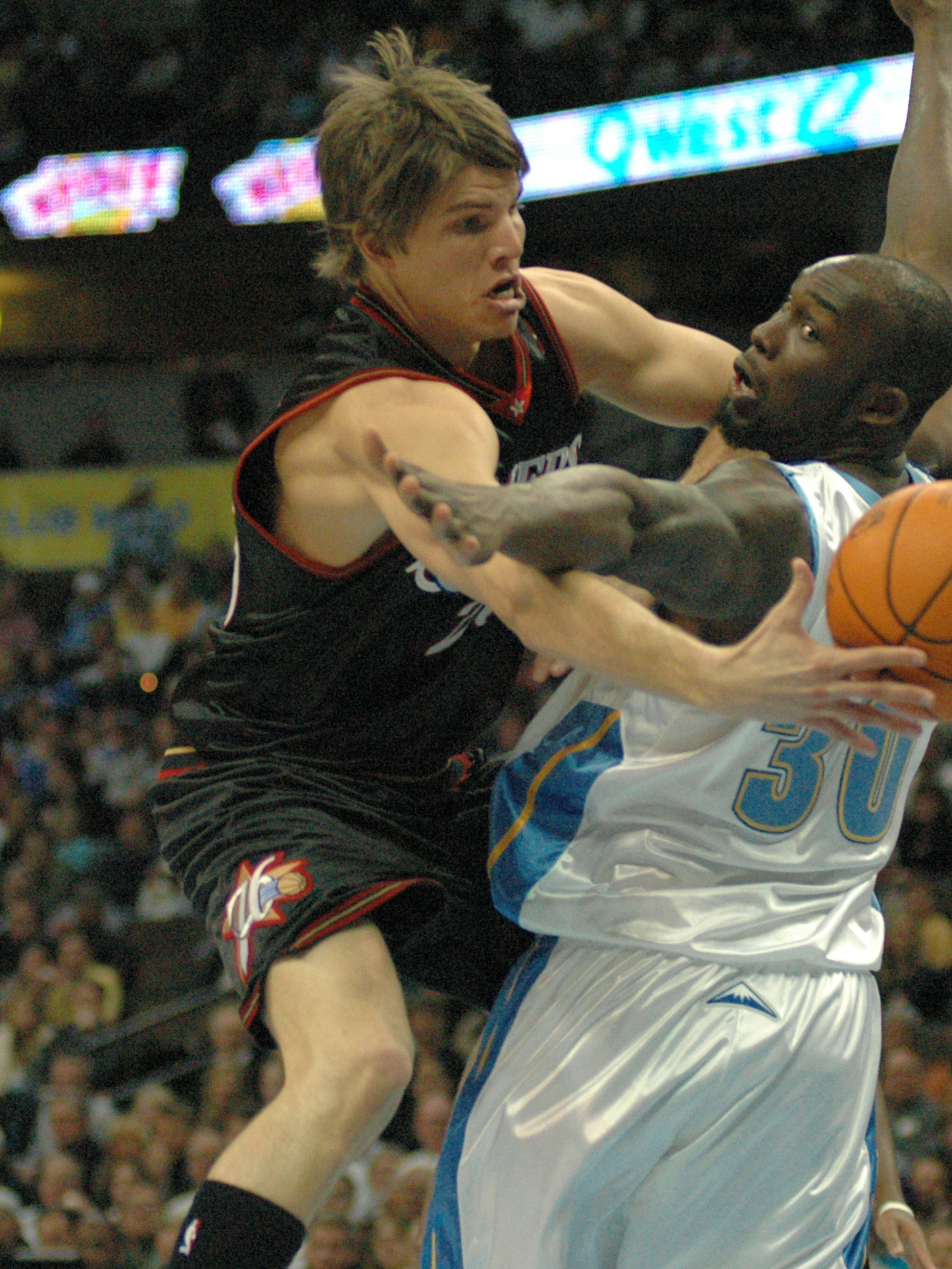
Korver (left) with the 76ers in January 2007

On June 26, 2003, Korver was selected by the New Jersey Nets with the 51st overall pick in the 2003 NBA draft. The Nets, fresh off an Atlantic Division win and an appearance in the NBA Finals, were low on cash and had none of their preferred draft choices remaining on the board. The organization selected Korver and immediately sold his draft rights to the 76ers for $125,000. The $125,000 reportedly covered the Nets' summer league costs and a new copy machine, with the "traded for a copy machine" incident becoming a rallying cry for Korver for the rest of his career. In 2019, Korver used the experience to help motivate that year's graduating class at his alma mater, Creighton University, explaining, "a few years ago, the copy machine broke...and I'm still playing."

As a rookie in 2003–04, he averaged 4.5 points and 1.5 rebounds in 74 games. On December 21, 2003, he scored a season-high 18 points against the Boston Celtics.

In 2004–05, Korver appeared in 82 games (57 starts), and averaged 11.5 points, 4.6 rebounds, and 2.2 assists. He set the Sixers record for three-pointers made (226) and attempted (558). He led the league in three-pointers made, and ranked among NBA leaders in attempts (third) and percentage (18th, .405). On November 26, 2004, he scored a season-high 26 points against the Washington Wizards.

On August 2, 2005, Korver re-signed with the 76ers to a six-year, $25 million contract. On February 24, 2006, he scored a career-high 31 points in a 116–111 win over the Milwaukee Bucks. In 82 games (43 starts) in 2005–06, he averaged 11.5 points, 3.3 rebounds, and 2.0 assists in 31.3 minutes. He shot .430 from the field and .849 from the free-throw line and ranked fifth in the league in three-pointers made and 11th in three-point percentage.

In his last full year in Philadelphia in 2006–07, Korver appeared in 74 games (one start) and averaged a career-high 14.4 points. He led the NBA in free throw percentage and ranked ninth in three-point shooting. On February 21, 2007, he made six 3-pointers and matched a career high with 31 points to lead the 76ers to a 104–84 victory over the New York Knicks.

=== Utah Jazz (2007–2010) ===
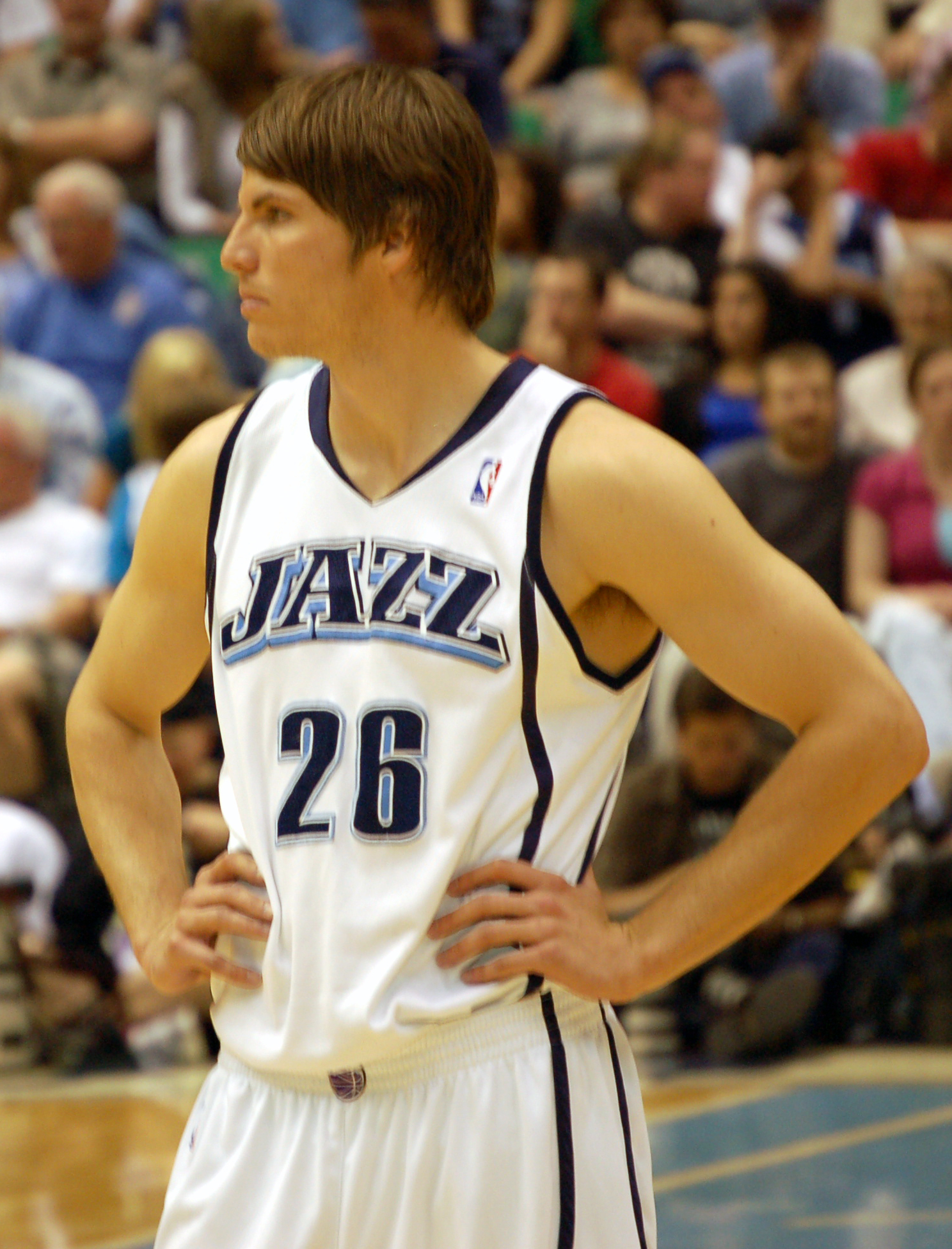
Korver with the Utah Jazz in 2008

On December 29, 2007, Korver was traded to the Utah Jazz in exchange for Gordan Giriček and a future first-round draft pick. On February 6, 2008, he scored a season-high 27 points against the Denver Nuggets.

In 2008–09, Korver appeared in 78 games (two starts) and averaged 9.0 points, 3.3 rebounds, and 1.8 assists. On March 14, 2009, he scored a season-high 25 points against the Miami Heat.

On October 28, 2009, Korver underwent surgery to remove a bone spur in his left knee. He subsequently missed the first 23 games of the 2009–10 season. On March 31, 2010, he scored a season-high 21 points against the Golden State Warriors. In 52 games, he averaged 7.2 points and 2.1 rebounds. He led the NBA in three-point shooting at .536 (59–110 3FGM), setting the NBA single season three-point shooting record, edging the record percentage of .524 that Steve Kerr set in 1994–95. His spot-on shooting surged after he finally returned fully healthy after the All-Star break, having struggled with wrist and knee issues following surgeries to both over the previous year.

=== Chicago Bulls (2010–2012) ===
On July 13, 2010, Korver signed with the Chicago Bulls. On November 24, 2010, he scored a season-high 24 points against the Phoenix Suns. In 2010–11, Korver, for the third time in his career, appeared in all 82 regular-season games (all coming off the bench), and averaged 8.3 points, 1.8 rebounds, and 1.5 assists in 20.1 minutes. After finishing as the first seed in the East with a 62–20 record, the Bulls advanced through to the Eastern Conference finals, where they were defeated in five games by the Miami Heat.

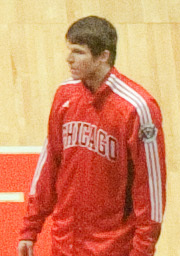
Korver warming up before a 2011 playoff game

Korver appeared in 65 games (seven starts) with the Bulls in 2011–12, averaging 8.1 points, 2.4 rebounds, and 1.7 assists in 22.6 minutes. On March 10, 2012, he scored a season-high 26 points in a 111–97 win over the Utah Jazz. He hit 6 of 11 3-pointers and had seven rebounds and six assists.

=== Atlanta Hawks (2012–2017) ===
==== 2012–13 season ====
On July 16, 2012, Korver was traded to the Atlanta Hawks in exchange for cash considerations. In 2012–13, he averaged 10.9 points in 30.5 minutes per game, while recording percentages of .461 FG%, .457 3FG%, and .859 FT%. He finished second in the NBA in three-point percentage and fourth in three-point field goals made with 189. He made at least one three-pointer in his final 73 games of the season, the longest active streak in the NBA at the time, a career-best and the fourth longest streak in league history (Dana Barros 89, Michael Adams 79, Dennis Scott 78). In addition, his 189 made threes was the fourth-best single season total in franchise history.

==== 2013–14 season ====
On July 12, 2013, Korver re-signed with the Hawks to a four-year, $24 million contract. On December 6, 2013, Korver passed the NBA record for most consecutive games with a made three-pointer (90) originally set by Dana Barros (89). The streak eventually ended at 127 games on March 5, 2014. Korver finished the 2013–14 season with a 47.2 percent three-point shooting percentage which led the NBA. It broke Tyronn Lue's (45.7%) franchise single-season three-point percentage (47.2%) record.

==== 2014–15 season: All-Star selection ====
On December 15, 2014, Korver passed Jason Richardson for 15th all-time in three-pointers made. Five days later, in the Hawks' 104–97 win over the Houston Rockets, Korver scored a game-high 22 points and made all four of his free-throw attempts. This gave him 49 consecutive made free-throws on the season to set a new Hawks franchise record. The streak ended at 50 in the Hawks' next game against the Dallas Mavericks. On February 10, 2015, Korver received his first NBA All-Star selection as a reserve for the Eastern Conference in the 2015 NBA All-Star Game, replacing the injured Dwyane Wade. At 33 years and 11 months old, he became the fourth-oldest first-time All-Star. On March 11, in a loss to the Denver Nuggets, Korver passed Kobe Bryant for 12th on the all-time three-pointers made list. Four days later in a win over the Los Angeles Lakers, Korver left the game with a broken nose after taking an offensive foul from Ed Davis with 8:59 left in the first half. The injury ended a streak of 51 consecutive games with a three-pointer by Korver, who missed both of his shots from behind the arc. After missing three games with the injury, he returned to action on March 22 against the San Antonio Spurs with protective gear on his face to cover the nose. Despite having the mask on March 31, 2015, Korver made four straight long-range shots, including three 3-pointers, in a 65-second span against the Milwaukee Bucks. Korver led the league in three-point shooting percentage for a third time (the second year in a row) with a 49.2%, which still stands as an Atlanta Hawks single-season franchise record.

On April 29, 2015, Korver was named the recipient of the Joe Dumars Trophy for winning the 2014–15 NBA Sportsmanship Award. During the 2015 playoffs, Korver suffered a right ankle sprain playing against the Cleveland Cavaliers on May 22 in the Eastern Conference Finals. The following day, he was ruled out for the rest of the playoffs.

==== 2015–16 season ====
On November 6, 2015, Korver scored 22 points, hitting all eight of his shots, including four from three-point range, as the Hawks won their sixth straight with a 121–115 victory over the New Orleans Pelicans. On December 26, in a win over the New York Knicks, Korver hit one three-pointer and passed Rashard Lewis for ninth place on the all-time list for three-pointers made. However, his late December shooting slump marked one of the worst shooting stretches of his career. In four games between December 23–29, Korver shot 5-of-33 from the field and a woeful 2-of-27 from three-point range. Korver continued to struggle with his shot in January, missing all six of his shots on January 31 against the Miami Heat, marking just the third time in his career that he went 0-of-6 or worse as a starter. Over 47 games to begin the season, his 42% field goal shooting was the worst it had been since the 2004–05 season, and his 37% three-point shooting was a career-low success rate.

==== 2016–17 season ====
On December 16, 2016, Korver scored a season-high 19 points and hit a season-high six three-pointers in a 125–121 win over the Toronto Raptors. The win gave the Hawks a 13–13 record after 26 games; they began the season 9–2. He set a season high on December 30, scoring 22 points in 29 minutes off the bench in a 105–98 win over the Detroit Pistons. Depending on the source/minimum threshold, Korver left the Hawks as the franchise career three-point percentage all-time leader (.452). NBA.com shows him as the leader, but Sports Reference does not (Tony Snell, 62–109 56.9%).

=== Cleveland Cavaliers (2017–2018) ===
==== 2016–17 season: First Finals appearance ====
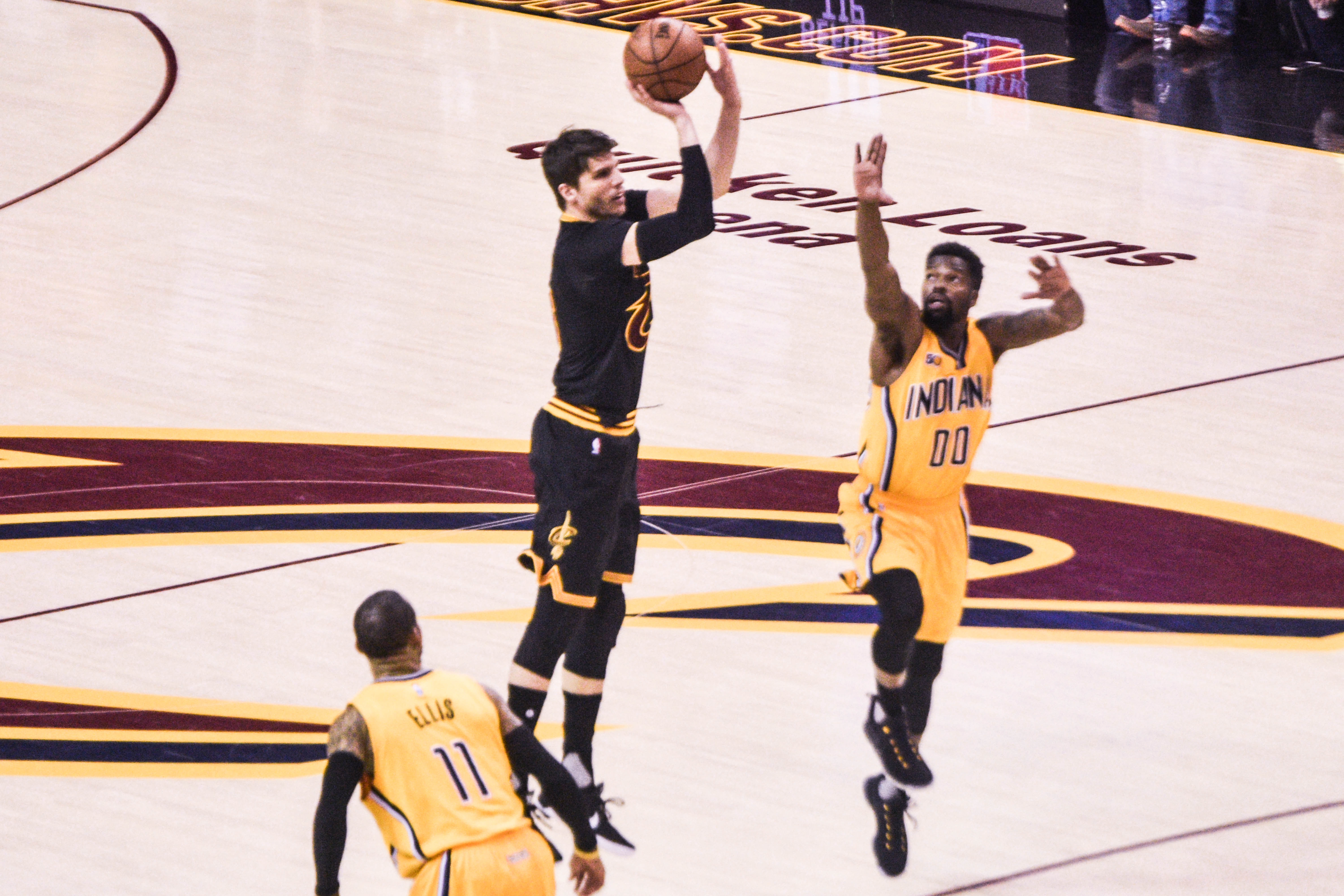
Korver as a member of the Cleveland Cavaliers in February 2017

On January 7, 2017, Korver was traded to the Cleveland Cavaliers in exchange for Mike Dunleavy, Mo Williams, cash considerations and a protected future first round draft pick. The trade would pair Korver with fellow 2003 draftee LeBron James. He made his debut for the Cavaliers three days later, recording two points and three rebounds in 17 minutes off the bench in a 100–92 loss to the Utah Jazz. Korver went 2-of-10 over his first two games for the Cavaliers, with both games resulting in losses. On January 13, he scored 18 points off the bench to help the Cavaliers defeat the Sacramento Kings 120–108. On February 1, he had his best game yet as a Cavalier, scoring 20 points off the bench on 8-of-11 from the field with four three-pointers in a 125–97 win over the Minnesota Timberwolves. However, on February 8, Korver scored a season-high 29 points on 10-of-12 from the field and 8-of-9 from the three-point line in a 132–117 win over the Indiana Pacers. He subsequently passed Jason Kidd (1,988) for seventh on the all-time three-pointers made list. A week later, on February 15, also against the Pacers, Korver became the seventh player in NBA history to make 2,000 career three-pointers, joining Ray Allen, Reggie Miller, Jason Terry, Paul Pierce, Vince Carter, and Jamal Crawford. On April 4, 2017, he returned after missing 11 games with a sore left foot and scored 11 points in 12 minutes in a 122–102 win over the Orlando Magic. Korver helped the Cavaliers go 12–1 over the first three rounds of the playoffs to reach the 2017 NBA Finals. There they faced the Golden State Warriors and were defeated in five games.

==== 2017–18 season ====
On July 12, 2017, Korver re-signed with the Cavaliers. On November 13, 2017, he scored 19 of his 21 points in the fourth quarter to spark a huge comeback for the Cavaliers, lifting them to a 104–101 win over the New York Knicks after they outscored New York 43–25 in the fourth. On January 6, 2018, in a 131–127 win over the Orlando Magic, Korver tied Paul Pierce for fourth place on the career 3-pointers list with 2,143. Two days later, he hit four 3-pointers and had 19 points off the bench in a 127–99 loss to the Minnesota Timberwolves, passing Pierce for fourth place on the NBA's all-time list in 3-pointers made with 2,147. On February 9, 2018, he scored a season-high 30 points in a 123–107 win over the Atlanta Hawks. He made 7 of 13 from 3-point range and finished two points from matching his career high of 32. It was his first 30-point game since February 21, 2007. Korver went 794 games between 30-point games, marking the longest stretch between 30-point games in NBA history. The Cavaliers returned to the NBA Finals in 2018, where they lost 4–0 to the Warriors.

==== 2018–19 season ====
On October 30, 2018, in a 136–114 win over the Atlanta Hawks, Korver reached 11,000 career points.

=== Return to Utah (2018–2019) ===
On November 29, 2018, Korver was traded to the Utah Jazz in exchange for Alec Burks and two future second-round draft picks. On January 12, 2019, against the Chicago Bulls, Korver passed Jason Terry (2,282) to move into fourth place on the NBA's all-time 3-pointers list.

On July 6, 2019, the Memphis Grizzlies acquired Korver from the Jazz as part of a package for Mike Conley Jr. The following day Korver was traded to the Phoenix Suns along with Jevon Carter in exchange for Josh Jackson, De'Anthony Melton, and a 2020 second-round pick. He was subsequently waived by the Suns.

=== Milwaukee Bucks (2019–2020) ===
On July 25, 2019, Korver signed a one-year deal with the Milwaukee Bucks.

On March 8, 2020, in a game where Korver saw increased minutes due to injuries, he scored a season-high 23 points, and tied a season-high five three-pointers made, in a 109–95 loss to the Denver Nuggets. On August 10, 2020, Korver scored 19 points and grabbed 4 rebounds in only 22 minutes of playing time in a 114–108 loss to the Toronto Raptors.

Korver's final NBA game was played in Game 5 of the 2020 Eastern Conference Semifinals on September 8, 2020, in a 94–103 loss to the Miami Heat. In his final game, Korver played for 6 minutes and recorded 3 points. He did not sign with any team for the 2020–21 season to spend more time with his family, despite not announcing his retirement.

== Coaching career ==
In August 2021, Korver was hired by the Brooklyn Nets as a player development coach.

== Executive career ==
On July 20, 2022, Korver joined the Atlanta Hawks as the team's director of player affairs and development. On January 16, 2023, the Atlanta Hawks named Korver their assistant general manager. On August 17, 2026, Korver stepped down from his position.

== Career statistics ==
Legend
GP	Games played	GS	Games started	MPG	Minutes per game
FG%	Field goal percentage	3P%	3-point field goal percentage	FT%	Free throw percentage
RPG	Rebounds per game	APG	Assists per game	SPG	Steals per game
BPG	Blocks per game	PPG	Points per game	**Bold**	Career high
*	Led the league	‡	NBA record

=== NBA ===
==== Regular season ====
Year	Team	GP	GS	MPG	FG%	3P%	FT%	RPG	APG	SPG	BPG	PPG
2003–04	Philadelphia	74	0	11.9	.352	.391	.792	1.5	.5	.3	.1	4.5
2004–05	Philadelphia	**82**	57	32.5	.418	.405	.854	**4.6**	2.2	**1.3**	.4	11.5
2005–06	Philadelphia	**82***	43	31.3	.430	.420	.849	3.3	2.0	.8	.3	11.5
2006–07	Philadelphia	74	1	30.9	.440	.430	.914*	3.5	1.4	.8	.3	**14.4**
2007–08	Philadelphia	25	0	26.3	.396	.352	.912	2.9	1.3	.8	.2	10.0
2007–08	Utah	50	0	21.5	.474	.388	.917	2.0	1.4	.4	.5	9.8
2008–09	Utah	78	2	24.0	.438	.386	.882	3.3	1.8	.6	.4	9.0
2009–10	Utah	52	0	18.3	**.493**	**.536**‡	.796	2.1	1.7	.5	.2	7.2
2010–11	Chicago	**82**	0	20.1	.434	.415	.885	1.8	1.5	.4	.2	8.3
2011–12	Chicago	65	7	22.6	.432	.435	.833	2.4	1.7	.6	.2	8.1
2012–13	Atlanta	74	60	30.5	.461	.457	.859	4.0	2.0	.9	.5	10.9
2013–14	Atlanta	71	71	**33.9**	.475	.472*	.926	4.0	**2.9**	1.0	.3	12.0
2014–15	Atlanta	75	75	32.2	.487	.492*	.898	4.1	2.6	.7	**.6**	12.1
2015–16	Atlanta	80	**80**	30.0	.434	.398	.833	3.3	2.1	.8	.4	9.2
2016–17	Atlanta	32	21	27.9	.441	.409	.889	2.8	2.3	.7	.4	9.5
2016–17	Cleveland	35	1	24.5	.487	.485	**.933**	2.7	1.0	.3	.2	10.7
2017–18	Cleveland	73	4	21.6	.459	.436	.889	2.3	1.2	.4	.4	9.2
2018–19	Cleveland	16	0	15.7	.461	.463	.813	1.8	1.1	.2	.1	6.8
2018–19	Utah	54	0	20.1	.408	.384	.825	2.5	1.2	.4	.2	9.1
2019–20	Milwaukee	58	1	16.6	.430	.418	.854	2.1	1.2	.4	.2	6.7
Career		1,232	423	25.3	.442	.429	.877	3.0	1.7	.7	.3	9.7
All-Star		1	0	15.6	.538	.583	.000	1.0	2.0	.0	.0	21.0

==== Playoffs ====
Year	Team	GP	GS	MPG	FG%	3P%	FT%	RPG	APG	SPG	BPG	PPG
2005	Philadelphia	5	5	29.4	.286	.292	**1.000**	2.6	1.6	.8	.2	5.0
2008	Utah	12	0	21.6	.411	.289	.920	2.2	.6	.3	.7	7.8
2009	Utah	5	2	27.2	.391	.462	.714	2.2	**2.6**	.6	.2	10.6
2010	Utah	10	0	21.0	**.525**	**.478**	.889	1.1	1.3	.5	.0	8.3
2011	Chicago	16	0	17.4	.388	.423	**1.000**	1.2	1.1	.5	.2	6.6
2012	Chicago	6	0	15.7	.409	.308	.500	1.7	1.5	.5	.5	3.8
2013	Atlanta	6	2	29.5	.388	.353	.917	3.3	.7	.3	.7	10.2
2014	Atlanta	7	7	35.1	.455	.426	.917	**5.3**	.7	.6	.3	**13.4**
2015	Atlanta	14	**14**	**37.6**	.391	.355	.813	5.0	2.4	**1.4**	**1.1**	11.1
2016	Atlanta	10	8	31.6	.467	.444	**1.000**	4.8	1.0	.9	.4	10.3
2017	Cleveland	18	0	18.1	.425	.391	**1.000**	1.7	.7	.4	.3	5.8
2018	Cleveland	**22**	11	23.0	.418	.413	.864	2.4	.9	.4	.4	8.3
2019	Utah	4	0	7.5	.375	.333	.667	1.3	.0	.0	.0	2.5
2020	Milwaukee	10	0	11.9	.426	.405	**1.000**	.8	.1	.3	.1	6.2
Career		145	49	23.2	.417	.391	.895	2.5	1.0	.6	.4	8.0

=== College ===
Year	Team	GP	GS	MPG	FG%	3P%	FT%	RPG	APG	SPG	BPG	PPG
1999–2000	Creighton	33	1	18.2	.475	.434	.895	3.1	1.0	.6	.2	8.8
2000–01	Creighton	32	32	29.4	.470	.452	.867	5.8	2.0	**1.8**	.4	14.6
2001–02	Creighton	29	28	31.6	**.478**	.429	.890	5.5	**3.3**	1.6	.6	15.1
2002–03	Creighton	**34**	**34**	**31.8**	.468	**.480**	**.908**	**6.4**	3.1	1.5	**.7**	**17.8**
Career		128	95	27.7	.472	.453	.891	5.2	2.3	1.3	.5	14.1

== Awards, honors, and records ==
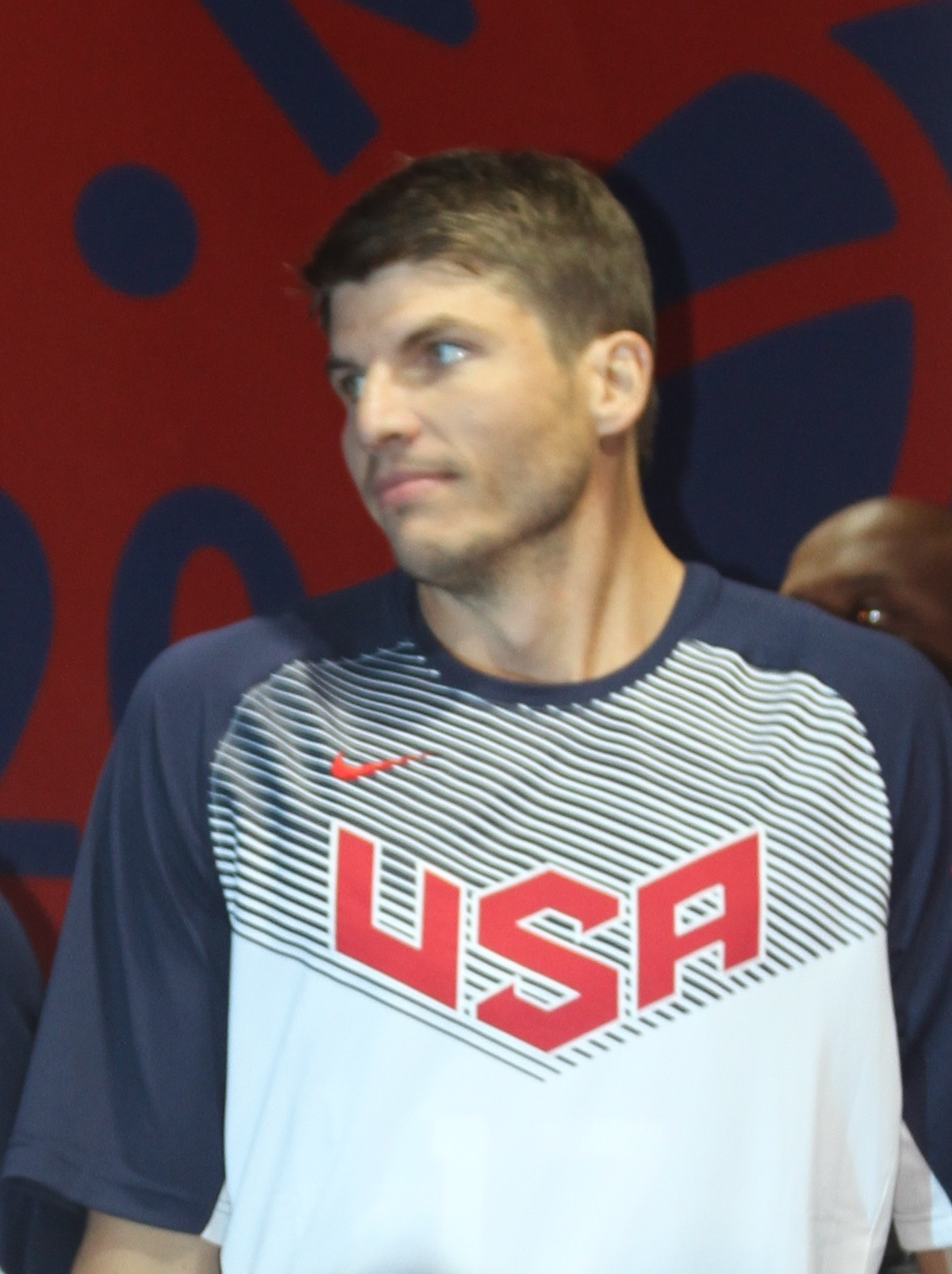
Korver at the 2014 World Basketball Festival

=== NBA ===
- All-Star (2015)
- NBA Sportsmanship Award (2015)
- 4× NBA three-point field goal percentage leader (2010, 2014, 2015, 2017)
- NBA free throw percentage leader (2007)
- NBA three-point field goals made leader (2005)
- NBA record for highest three-point shooting percentage in a regular season (53.6%): 2010
- NBA record for most seasons leading league in three-point percentage (4)

==== Atlanta Hawks ====
- Single-season 3-point field goal percentage (.492, 2014–15)
- Career 3-point field goal percentage (.452)

==== Utah Jazz ====
- Single-season 3-point field goal percentage (.536, 2009–10)

=== NCAA ===
- Missouri Valley Conference career made three-pointers record (371)
- Missouri Valley Conference single season made three-pointers record (123): 2003
- Consensus Second Team All-American: 2003
- Honorable Mention All-American by Associated Press: 2002
- Missouri Valley Conference Player of the Year: 2002, 2003
- First Team All-Missouri Valley Conference: 2002, 2003
- Second Team All-Missouri Valley Conference: 2001
- Missouri Valley Conference tournament MVP: 2002, 2003
- Missouri Valley Conference All-Tournament Team: 2001, 2002, 2003
- Missouri Valley Conference All-Freshman Team: 2000
- Missouri Valley Conference All-Bench Team: 2000
- Guardians Classic Omaha Regional MVP: 2003
- Guardians Classic Tournament MVP: 2003
- Guardians Classic All-Tournament Team: 2003
- CollegeInsider.com Mid-Major Player of the Year: 2003
- CollegeInsider.com Mid-Major All-America Team: 2002, 2003

== Personal life ==
Korver has three brothers, Klayton, Kaleb and Kirk (1990–2018), all of whom played Division I basketball. Klayton was a guard/forward for the Drake Bulldogs; Kaleb a guard for the Creighton Bluejays; and Kirk a forward for the UMKC Kangaroos. His mother Laine played high school basketball and once scored 74 points in a game. Korver's father Kevin is a pastor in Pella, Iowa, and his uncle Kris was the head basketball coach at Northwestern College in Orange City, Iowa. His cousin Kari Korver is a former UCLA women's basketball player.

Korver married Juliet Richardson on August 10, 2011. Their daughter Kyra Elyse was born on December 5, 2012. His wife delivered their first boy, Knox Elliot, on October 4, 2014. Their second son, Koen, was born on November 7, 2016.

Korver founded the Kyle Korver Foundation, which contributes to many philanthropic causes. He held a coat drive while with the 76ers, where he collected and donated coats to children in need. Korver added a new line of clothing called Seer Outfitters connected to his foundation to help underprivileged children. In October 2013, he started the "Socktober Drive", in which he collected socks to donate to homeless people in Atlanta. Korver has also participated in the NBA's Basketball Without Borders outreach program in South Africa, China, Brazil and India. Korver is a Christian.

In March 2018, Korver took a leave of absence from the Cavaliers following the death of his brother Kirk, who died just before he was about to receive a liver transplant after suffering an unknown illness that caused multiple organ failure.

== See also ==
- List of National Basketball Association career 3-point scoring leaders
- List of National Basketball Association career 3-point field goal percentage leaders
- List of National Basketball Association career free throw percentage leaders
- List of National Basketball Association career playoff 3-point scoring leaders
