= List of NBA annual field goal percentage leaders =

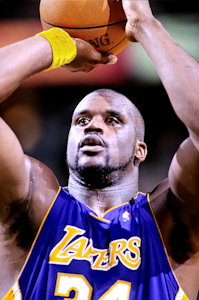
Shaquille O'Neal has the most seasons leading the NBA in field goal percentage with 10 seasons.

In basketball, a field goal is a basket scored from an action on the playing court, except free throws. The National Basketball Association's (NBA) field goal percentage leader is the player with the highest field goal percentage in a given season. To qualify as a field goal percentage leader, the player must have made at least 300 field goals. Aside from the lockout shortened 1998–99 NBA season and 2011–12 NBA season, as well as the COVID-19 pandemic shortened 2019–20 NBA season and 2020–21 NBA season, this has been the entry criteria since the 1974–75 NBA season.

Mitchell Robinson holds the record for the highest field goal percentage in single season (.7419), which was accomplished in the 2019–20 NBA season.

Shaquille O'Neal has led the league in field goal percentage a record ten times. Wilt Chamberlain led the league nine times. DeAndre Jordan led the league five times. Artis Gilmore and Rudy Gobert each led the league four times. Neil Johnston led the league three times. Johnny Green, Alex Groza, Ed Macauley, Cedric Maxwell, Kevin McHale, Gheorghe Mureșan, Ken Sears and Buck Williams each lead the league two times. Wilt Chamberlain, DeAndre Jordan and Shaquille O'Neal each hold the record for consecutive seasons leading the league in field goal percentage (5x). Other players to lead the league in field goal percentage include Artis Gilmore (4x), Rudy Gobert (3x), Neil Johnston, Johnny Green, Alex Groza, Ed Macauley, Cedric Maxwell, Kevin McHale, Gheorghe Mureșan, Ken Sears and Buck Williams each did it (2x).

== Key ==
^		Denotes player who is still active in the NBA			
*		Inducted into the Naismith Memorial Basketball Hall of Fame			
†		Not yet eligible for Hall of Fame consideration (Note: A player is not eligible for induction into the Naismith Memorial Basketball Hall of Fame until he has been fully retired for two calendar years.)			
Player (X)		Denotes the number of times the player had been the field goal percentage leader up to and including that season			
G	Guard	F	Forward	C	Center

== Annual leaders ==
Season	Player	Position (Note: The player's primary position is listed first.)	Team	Games played	Field goals made	Field goals attempted	FG%	Ref.
1946–47	Bob Feerick	F/G	Washington Capitols	55	364	908	.4009	
1947–48	Buddy Jeannette*	G	Baltimore Bullets	46	150	430	.3488	
1948–49	Arnie Risen*	C/F	Rochester Royals	60	345	816	.4228	
1949–50	Alex Groza	C	Indianapolis Olympians	64	521	1090	.4780	
1950–51	Alex Groza (2)	C	Indianapolis Olympians	66	492	1046	.4704	
1951–52	Paul Arizin*	F/G	Philadelphia Warriors	66	548	1222	.4484	
1952–53	Ed Macauley*	C/F	Boston Celtics	69	451	997	.4524	
1952–53	Neil Johnston*	C	Philadelphia Warriors	70	504	1114	.4524	
1953–54	Ed Macauley* (2)	C/F	Boston Celtics	71	492	950	.4863	
1954–55	Larry Foust	C/F	Fort Wayne Pistons	70	398	818	.4866	
1955–56	Neil Johnston* (2)	C	Philadelphia Warriors	70	499	1092	.4570	
1956–57	Neil Johnston* (3)	C	Philadelphia Warriors	69	520	1163	.4471	
1957–58	Jack Twyman*	F/G	Cincinnati Royals	72	465	1028	.4523	
1958–59	Ken Sears	F	New York Knicks	71	491	1002	.4900	
1959–60	Ken Sears (2)	F	New York Knicks	64	412	863	.4774	
1960–61	Wilt Chamberlain*	C	Philadelphia Warriors	79	1251	2457	.5092	
1961–62	Walt Bellamy*	C	Chicago Packers	79	973	1875	.5189	
1962–63	Wilt Chamberlain* (2)	C	San Francisco Warriors	80	1463	2770	.5282	
1963–64	Jerry Lucas*	F/C	Cincinnati Royals	79	545	1035	.5266	
1964–65	Wilt Chamberlain* (3)	C	San Francisco Warriors; Philadelphia 76ers	73	1063	2083	.5103	
1965–66	Wilt Chamberlain* (4)	C	Philadelphia 76ers	79	1074	1990	.5397	
1966–67	Wilt Chamberlain* (5)	C	Philadelphia 76ers	81	785	1150	.6826	
1967–68	Wilt Chamberlain* (6)	C	Philadelphia 76ers	82	819	1377	.5948	
1968–69	Wilt Chamberlain* (7)	C	Los Angeles Lakers	81	641	1099	.5833	
1969–70	Johnny Green	F/C	Cincinnati Royals	78	481	860	.5593	
1970–71	Johnny Green (2)	F/C	Cincinnati Royals	75	502	855	.5871	
1971–72	Wilt Chamberlain* (8)	C	Los Angeles Lakers	82	496	764	.6492	
1972–73	Wilt Chamberlain* (9)	C	Los Angeles Lakers	82	426	586	.7270	
1973–74	Bob McAdoo*	C/F	Buffalo Braves	74	901	1647	.5471	
1974–75	Don Nelson	F	Boston Celtics	79	423	785	.5389	
1975–76	John Shumate	F/C	Phoenix Suns; Buffalo Braves	75	332	592	.5608	
1975–76	Wes Unseld*	C/F	Washington Bullets	78	318	567	.5608	
1976–77	Kareem Abdul-Jabbar*	C	Los Angeles Lakers	82	888	1533	.5793	
1977–78	Bobby Jones	F	Denver Nuggets	75	440	761	.5782	
1978–79	Cedric Maxwell	F	Boston Celtics	80	472	808	.5842	
1979–80	Cedric Maxwell (2)	F	Boston Celtics	80	457	750	.6093	
1980–81	Artis Gilmore*	C	Chicago Bulls	82	547	816	.6703	
1981–82	Artis Gilmore* (2)	C	Chicago Bulls	82	546	837	.6523	
1982–83	Artis Gilmore* (3)	C	San Antonio Spurs	82	556	888	.6261	
1983–84	Artis Gilmore* (4)	C	San Antonio Spurs	64	351	556	.6313	
1984–85	James Donaldson	C	Los Angeles Clippers	82	351	551	.6370	
1985–86	Steve Johnson	C/F	San Antonio Spurs	71	362	573	.6318	
1986–87	Kevin McHale*	F/C	Boston Celtics	77	790	1307	.6044	
1987–88	Kevin McHale* (2)	F/C	Boston Celtics	64	550	911	.6037	
1988–89	Dennis Rodman*	F	Detroit Pistons	82	316	531	.5951	
1989–90	Mark West	C/F	Phoenix Suns	82	331	530	.6245	
1990–91	Buck Williams	F/C	Portland Trail Blazers	80	358	595	.6017	
1991–92	Buck Williams (2)	F/C	Portland Trail Blazers	80	340	563	.6039	
1992–93	Cedric Ceballos	F	Phoenix Suns	74	381	662	.5755	
1993–94	Shaquille O'Neal*	C	Orlando Magic	81	953	1591	.5990	
1994–95	Chris Gatling	F/C	Golden State Warriors	58	324	512	.6328	
1995–96	Gheorghe Mureșan	C	Washington Bullets	76	466	798	.5840	
1996–97	Gheorghe Mureșan (2)	C	Washington Bullets	73	327	541	.6044	
1997–98	Shaquille O'Neal* (2)	C	Los Angeles Lakers	60	670	1147	.5841	
1998–99 (Note: The 1998–99 NBA season was shortened to 50 games due to the league's lockout. The qualification of this season's field goal percentage leader was to have at least 183 field goals made.)	Shaquille O'Neal* (3)	C	Los Angeles Lakers	49	510	885	.5763	
1999–00	Shaquille O'Neal* (4)	C	Los Angeles Lakers	79	956	1665	.5742	
2000–01	Shaquille O'Neal* (5)	C	Los Angeles Lakers	74	813	1422	.5717	
2001–02	Shaquille O'Neal* (6)	C	Los Angeles Lakers	67	712	1229	.5793	
2002–03	Eddy Curry	C	Chicago Bulls	81	335	573	.5846	
2003–04	Shaquille O'Neal* (7)	C	Los Angeles Lakers	67	554	948	.5844	
2004–05	Shaquille O'Neal* (8)	C	Miami Heat	73	658	1095	.6009	
2005–06	Shaquille O'Neal* (9)	C	Miami Heat	59	480	800	.6000	
2006–07	Mikki Moore	C	New Jersey Nets	79	308	506	.6087	
2007–08	Andris Biedriņš	C	Golden State Warriors	76	340	543	.6262	
2008–09	Shaquille O'Neal* (10)	C	Phoenix Suns	75	512	841	.6088	
2009–10	Dwight Howard*	C	Orlando Magic	82	510	834	.6115	
2010–11	Nenê	C/F	Denver Nuggets	75	402	654	.6147	
2011–12 (Note: The 2011–12 NBA season was shortened to 66 games due to the league's lockout. The qualification of this season's field goal percentage leader was to have at least 241 field goals made.)	Tyson Chandler	C	New York Knicks	62	241	335	.6789	
2012–13	DeAndre Jordan^	C	Los Angeles Clippers	82	314	448	.6434	
2013–14	DeAndre Jordan^ (2)	C	Los Angeles Clippers	82	348	515	.6757	
2014–15	DeAndre Jordan^ (3)	C	Los Angeles Clippers	82	379	534	.7100	
2015–16	DeAndre Jordan^ (4)	C	Los Angeles Clippers	77	357	508	.7028	
2016–17	DeAndre Jordan^ (5)	C	Los Angeles Clippers	81	412	577	.7140	
2017–18	Clint Capela^	C	Houston Rockets	74	441	676	.6524	
2018–19	Rudy Gobert^	C	Utah Jazz	81	476	712	.6685	
2019–20 (Note: The 2019–20 NBA season was shortened due to the COVID-19 pandemic. Teams ended the season with varying numbers of played games. Mitchell Robinson's team, the New York Knicks, played 66 games; he was required to make at least 242 field goals to be qualified as field goal percentage leader.)	Mitchell Robinson^	C	New York Knicks	61	253	341	.7419	
2020–21 (Note: The 2020–21 NBA season was shortened to 72 games due to the late finish of the previous season. The qualification of this season's field goal percentage leader was to have at least 264 field goals made.)	Rudy Gobert^ (2)	C	Utah Jazz	71	391	579	.6753	
2021–22	Rudy Gobert^ (3)	C	Utah Jazz	66	362	508	.7126	
2022–23	Nic Claxton^	C	Brooklyn Nets	76	414	587	.7053	
2023–24	Daniel Gafford^	C	Washington Wizards; Dallas Mavericks	74	348	480	.7250	
2024–25	Jarrett Allen^	C	Cleveland Cavaliers	82	452	640	.7063	
2025–26	Rudy Gobert^ (4)	C	Minnesota Timberwolves	76	335	491	.6823	

== Multiple-time leaders ==
Rank	Player	Team	Times leader	Years
1	Shaquille O'Neal	Orlando Magic (1) / Los Angeles Lakers (6) / Miami Heat (2) / Phoenix Suns (1)	10	1994, 1998, 1999, 2000, 2001, 2002, 2004, 2005, 2006, 2009
2	Wilt Chamberlain	Philadelphia Warriors/San Francisco Warriors (3) / Philadelphia 76ers (3) / Los Angeles Lakers (3)	9	1961, 1963, 1965, 1966, 1967, 1968, 1969, 1972, 1973
3	DeAndre Jordan	Los Angeles Clippers	5	2013, 2014, 2015, 2016, 2017
4	Artis Gilmore	Chicago Bulls (2) / San Antonio Spurs (2)	4	1981, 1982, 1983, 1984
4	Rudy Gobert	Utah Jazz (3) / Minnesota Timberwolves (1)	4	2019, 2020, 2021, 2026
6	Neil Johnston	Philadelphia Warriors	3	1953, 1956, 1957
7	Johnny Green	Cincinnati Royals	2	1970, 1971
7	Alex Groza	Indianapolis Olympians	2	1950, 1951
7	Ed Macauley	Boston Celtics	2	1953, 1954
7	Cedric Maxwell	Boston Celtics	2	1979, 1980
7	Kevin McHale	Boston Celtics	2	1987, 1988
7	Gheorghe Mureșan	Washington Bullets	2	1996, 1997
7	Ken Sears	New York Knicks	2	1959, 1960
7	Buck Williams	Portland Trail Blazers	2	1991, 1992

== See also ==
- List of NBA annual free throw percentage leaders
- List of NBA annual 3-point field goal percentage leaders
- List of NBA annual scoring leaders
- List of NBA annual 3-point scoring leaders
- List of NBA annual rebounding leaders
- List of NBA annual assists leaders
- List of NBA annual steals leaders
- List of NBA annual blocks leaders
