= List of NBA annual assists leaders =

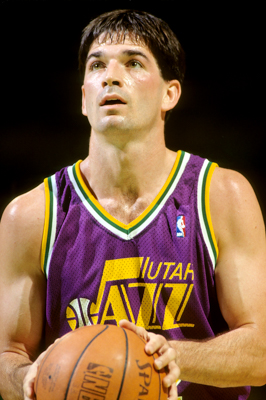
John Stockton won a record nine assists titles in his career.

In basketball, an assist is a pass to a teammate that directly leads to a score by field goal. The National Basketball Association's (NBA) assist title is awarded to the player with the highest assists per game average in a given season. The assists title was first recognized in the 1946–47 season when statistics on assists were first compiled by the Basketball Association of America (BAA), predecessor of the NBA. To qualify for the assist title, the player must appear in at least 58 games (out of 82). However, a player who appears in fewer than 58 games may qualify as the annual assists leader if his assist total would have given him the greatest average, had he appeared in 58 games. This has been the requirement since the 2013–14 season. The assists title was originally determined by assist total through the 1968–69 season, after which assists per game was used to determine the leader instead.

John Stockton holds the all-time records for total assists (1,164) and assists per game (14.54) in a season, achieved in the 1990–91 and 1989–90 seasons respectively. Mark Jackson holds the rookie records for total assists and assists per game when he had 868 and averaged 10.6 in the 1987–88 season. Among active players, James Harden had the highest season assists total (907) in the 2016-17 season and Russell Westbrook had the highest season assists average (11.74) in the 2020–21 season.

Stockton has the most assists titles in his career, with nine. Bob Cousy won eight assists titles, while Oscar Robertson won six. Jason Kidd, Chris Paul, and Steve Nash have five assists titles, while Kevin Porter and Magic Johnson each won four. Rajon Rondo and Russell Westbrook have three, while Andy Phillip, Guy Rodgers and James Harden are the only other players with multiple titles. Stockton also won the most consecutive assists titles, with nine. Four players have won both the assists title and the NBA championship in the same season: Cousy in 1957 and from 1959 to 1960 with the Boston Celtics; Jerry West in 1972 with the Los Angeles Lakers; Johnson in 1987 with the Lakers, and LeBron James with the Lakers in 2020. Nate Archibald is the only player in NBA history to lead the league in assists and scoring in the same year, which he achieved in the 1972–73 season.

== Key ==
^		Denotes player who is still active in the NBA			
*		Inducted into the Naismith Memorial Basketball Hall of Fame			
†		Not yet eligible for Hall of Fame consideration (Note: A player is not eligible for induction into the Naismith Memorial Basketball Hall of Fame until he has been fully retired for two calendar years.)			
‡		Denotes player who won the MVP award that year			
Player (X)		Denotes the number of times the player had been the assists leader up to and including that season			
G	Guard	F	Forward	C	Center

== Annual leaders ==
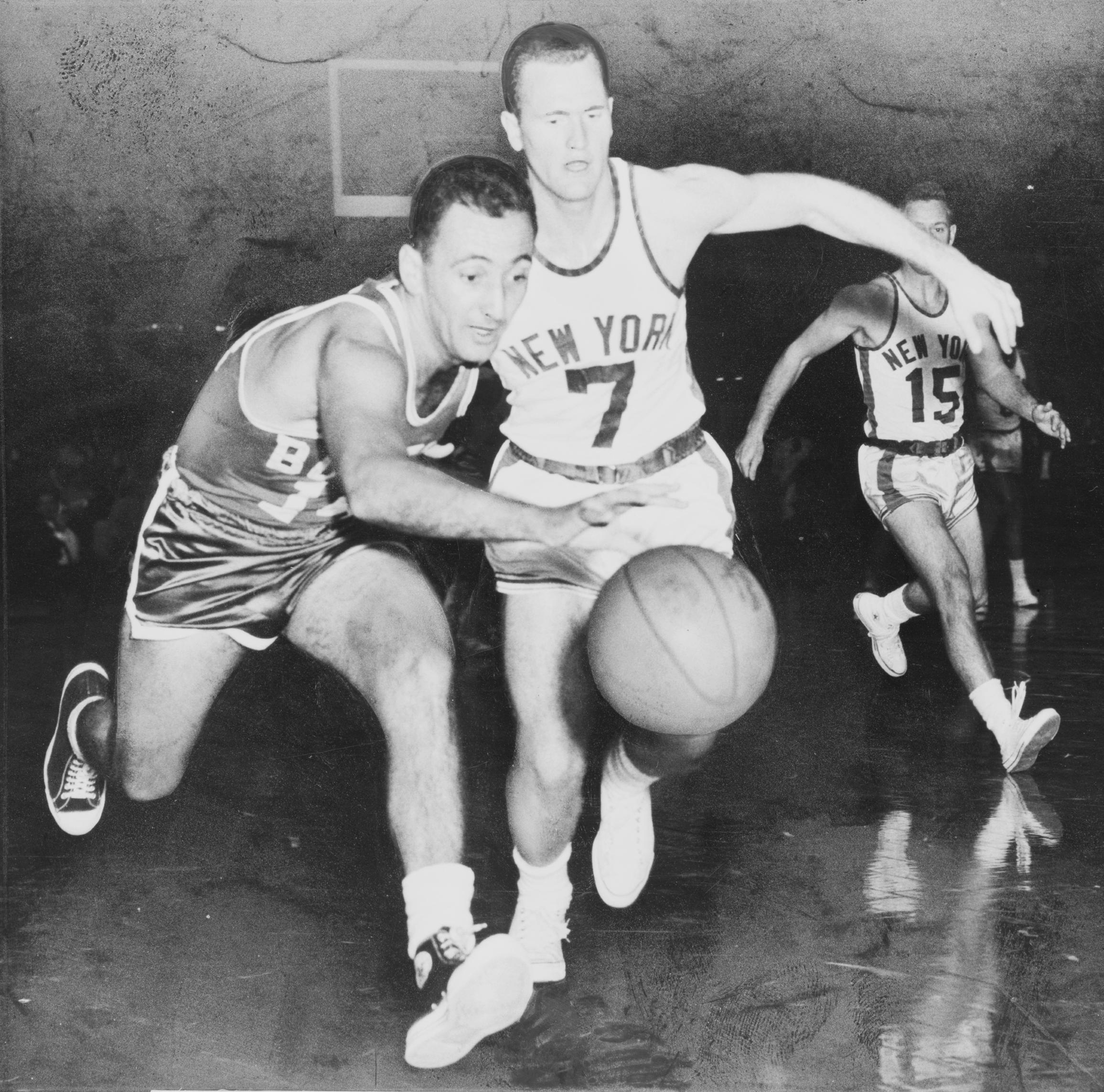
Bob Cousy (left) was the assists leader from 1953 to 1960.

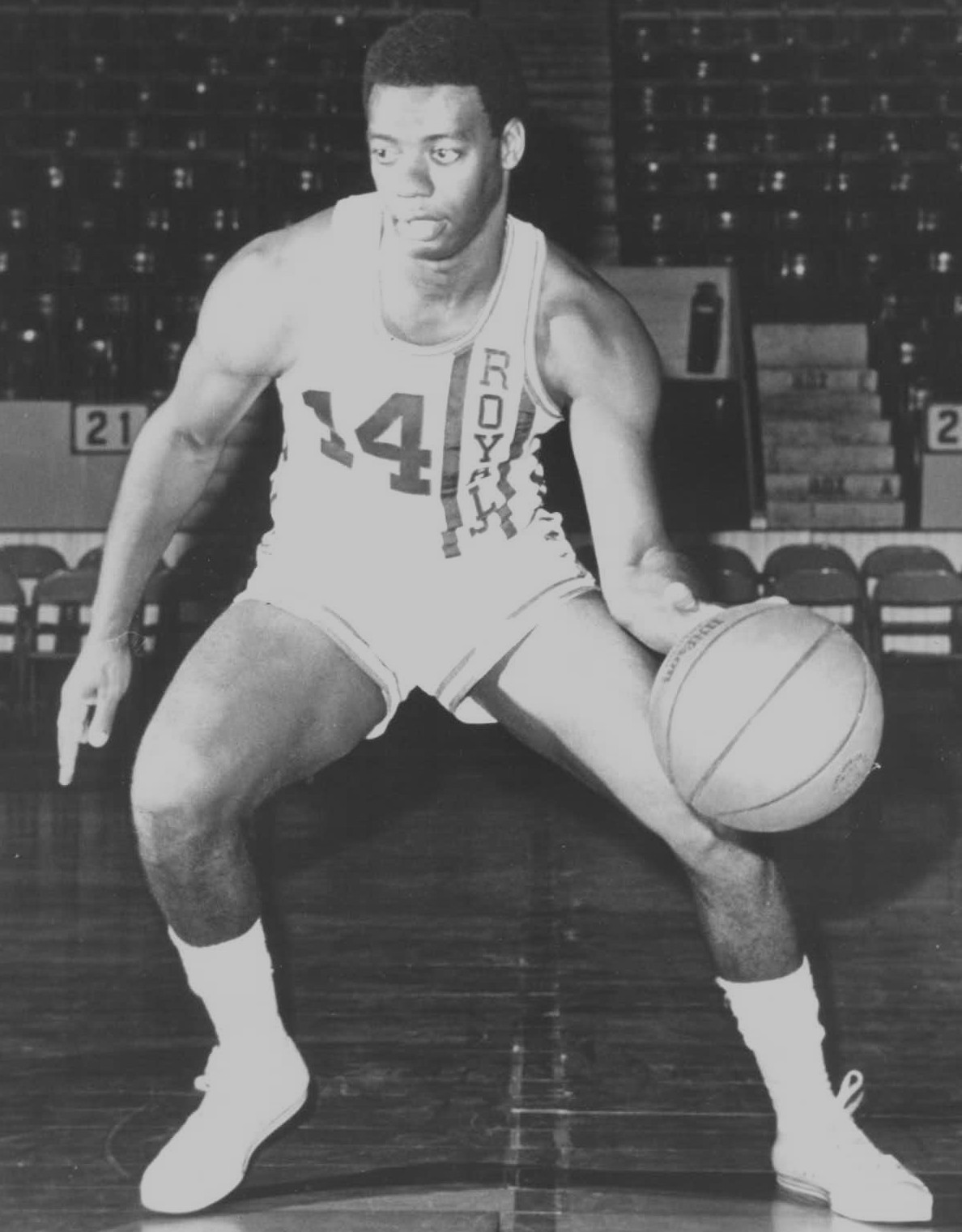
Oscar Robertson led the NBA in assists six times during the 1960s

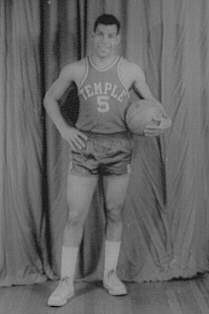
Guy Rodgers was the assists leader in 1963 and 1967.

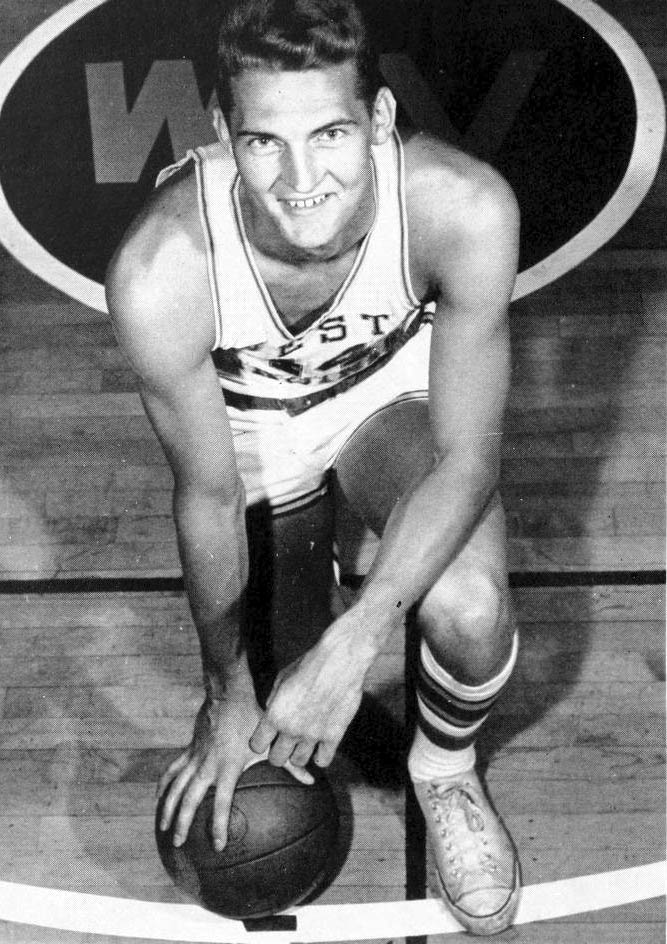
Jerry West was the assists leader in 1972.

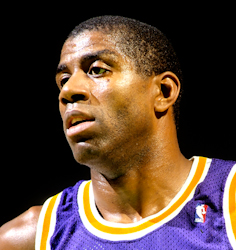
Magic Johnson was the assists leader from 1983 to 1984 and from 1986 to 1987.

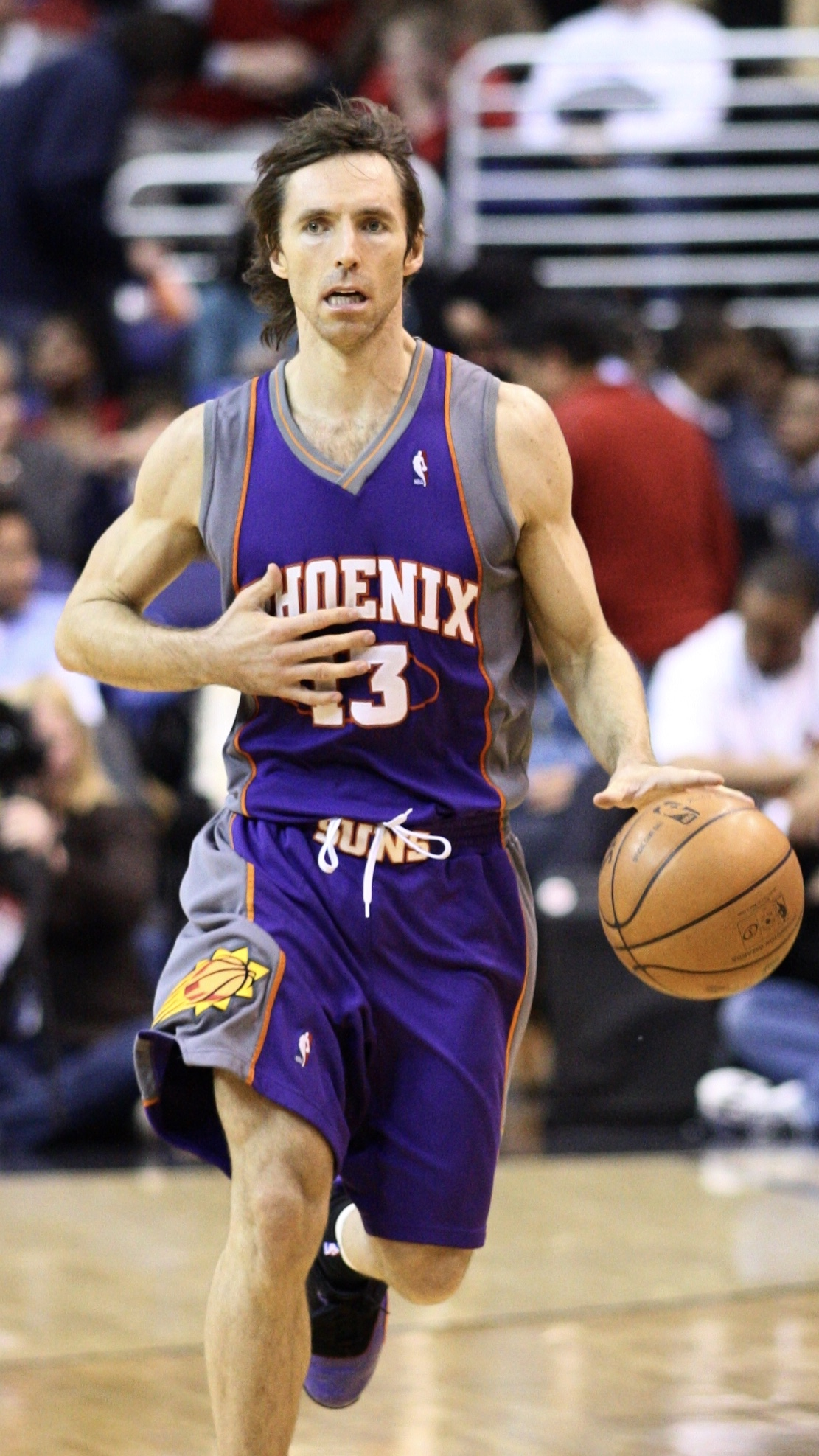
Steve Nash was the assists leader from 2005 to 2007 and 2010 to 2011.

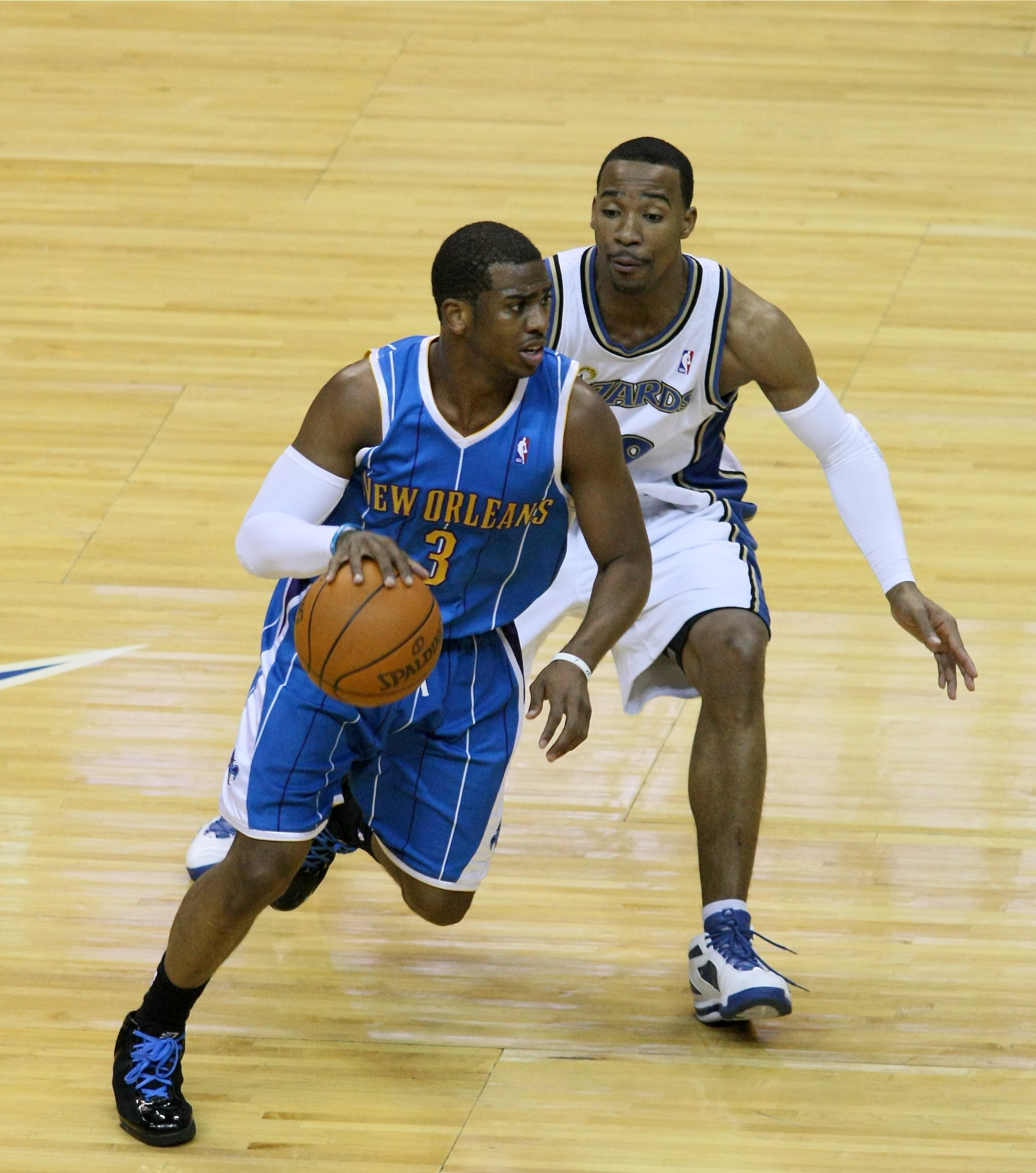
Chris Paul was the assists leader from 2008 to 2009, from 2014 to 2015, and in 2022.

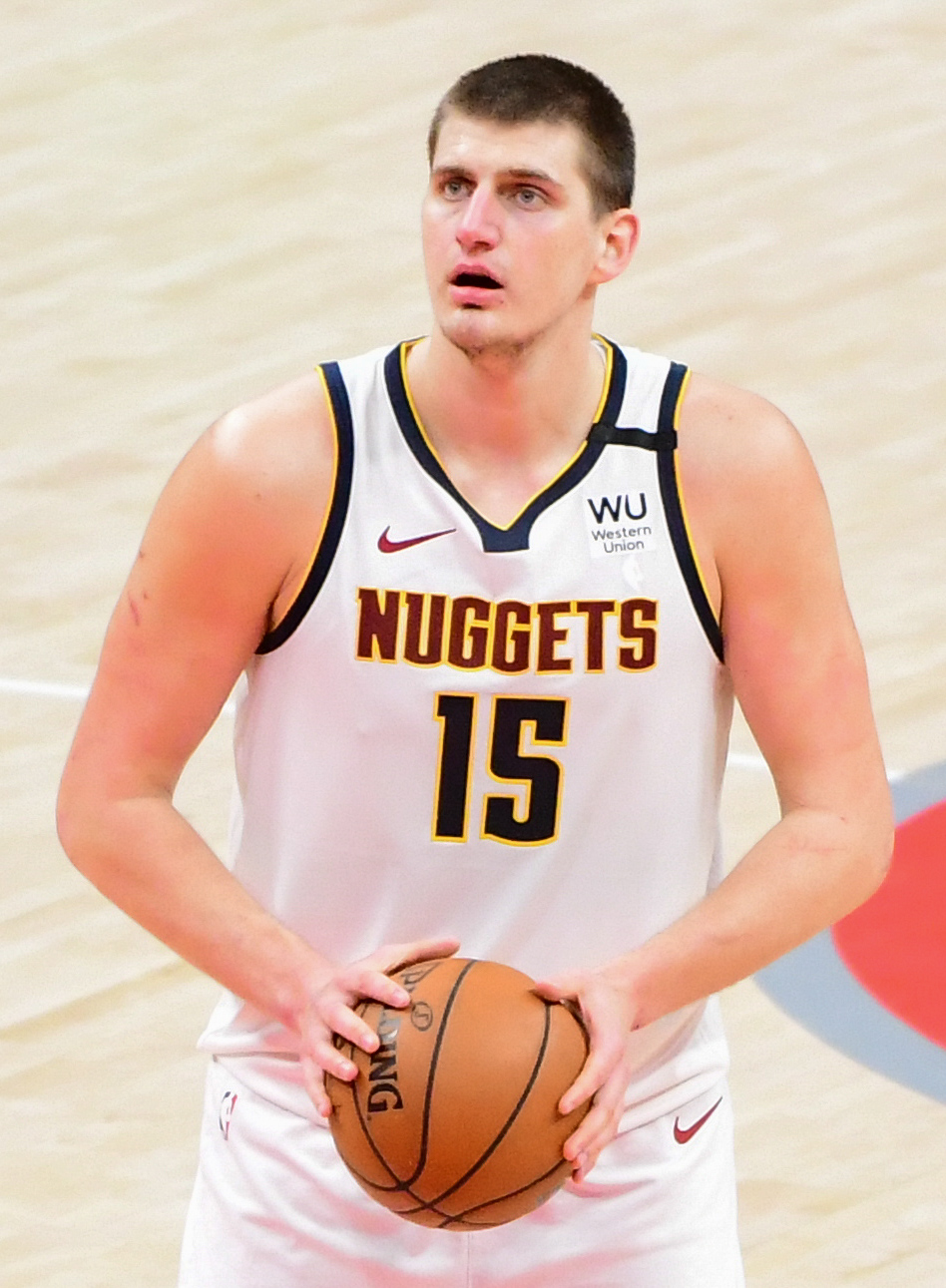
Nikola Jokić is the reigning assists leader in the NBA

Season	Player	Position (Note: The player's primary position is listed first.)	Team	Games played	Total assists	Assists per game	Ref
1946–47	Ernie Calverley	G	Providence Steamrollers	59	202	3.42	
1947–48	Howie Dallmar	F	Philadelphia Warriors	48	120	2.50	
1948–49	Bob Davies*	G/F	Rochester Royals	60	321	5.35	
1949–50	Dick McGuire*	G	New York Knicks	68	386	5.68	
1950–51	Andy Phillip*	G/F	Philadelphia Warriors	66	414	6.27	
1951–52	Andy Phillip* (2)	G/F	Philadelphia Warriors	66	539	8.17	
1952–53	Bob Cousy*	G	Boston Celtics	71	547	7.70	
1953–54	Bob Cousy* (2)	G	Boston Celtics	72	518	7.19	
1954–55	Bob Cousy* (3)	G	Boston Celtics	71	557	7.85	
1955–56	Bob Cousy* (4)	G	Boston Celtics	72	642	8.92	
1956–57 ‡	Bob Cousy* (5)	G	Boston Celtics	64	478	7.47	
1957–58	Bob Cousy* (6)	G	Boston Celtics	65	463	7.12	
1958–59	Bob Cousy* (7)	G	Boston Celtics	65	557	8.57	
1959–60	Bob Cousy* (8)	G	Boston Celtics	75	715	9.53	
1960–61	Oscar Robertson*	G	Cincinnati Royals	71	690	9.72	
1961–62	Oscar Robertson* (2)	G	Cincinnati Royals	79	899	11.38	
1962–63	Guy Rodgers*	G	San Francisco Warriors	79	825	10.44	
1963–64 ‡	Oscar Robertson* (3)	G	Cincinnati Royals	79	868	10.99	
1964–65	Oscar Robertson* (4)	G	Cincinnati Royals	75	861	11.48	
1965–66	Oscar Robertson* (5)	G	Cincinnati Royals	76	847	11.14	
1966–67	Guy Rodgers* (2)	G	Chicago Bulls	81	908	11.21	
1967–68 ‡	Wilt Chamberlain*	C	Philadelphia 76ers	82	702	8.56	
1968–69	Oscar Robertson* (6)	G	Cincinnati Royals	79	772	9.77	
1969–70	Lenny Wilkens*	G	Seattle SuperSonics	75	683	9.11	
1970–71	Norm Van Lier	G	Cincinnati Royals	82	832	10.15	
1971–72	Jerry West* (Note: In the 1971–72 season, Lenny Wilkens had the highest assist total (766) but was second in assist average (9.6).)	G	Los Angeles Lakers	77	747	9.70	
1972–73	Nate Archibald*	G	Kansas City–Omaha Kings	80	910	11.38	
1973–74	Ernie DiGregorio	G	Buffalo Braves	81	663	8.19	
1974–75	Kevin Porter	G	Washington Bullets	81	650	8.02	
1975–76	Slick Watts	G	Seattle SuperSonics	82	661	8.06	
1976–77	Don Buse	G	Indiana Pacers	81	685	8.46	
1977–78	Kevin Porter (2)	G	Detroit Pistons; New Jersey Nets	82	837	10.21	
1978–79	Kevin Porter (3)	G	Detroit Pistons	82	1,099	13.40	
1979–80	Michael Ray Richardson	G/F	New York Knicks	82	835	10.15	
1980–81	Kevin Porter (4)	G	Washington Bullets	81	734	9.06	
1981–82	Johnny Moore	G	San Antonio Spurs	79	762	9.65	
1982–83	Magic Johnson*	G	Los Angeles Lakers	79	829	10.49	
1983–84	Magic Johnson* (2) (Note: In the 1983–84 season, Isiah Thomas and Norm Nixon both had the highest assist totals (914) but they were tied for second in assist average (11.1).)	G	Los Angeles Lakers	67	875	13.06	
1984–85	Isiah Thomas*	G	Detroit Pistons	81	1,123	13.86	
1985–86	Magic Johnson* (3)	G	Los Angeles Lakers	72	907	12.60	
1986–87 ‡	Magic Johnson* (4)	G	Los Angeles Lakers	80	977	12.21	
1987–88	John Stockton*	G	Utah Jazz	82	1,128	13.76	
1988–89	John Stockton* (2)	G	Utah Jazz	82	1,118	13.63	
1989–90	John Stockton* (3) (Note: John Stockton holds the all-time record for total assists per game in a single season.)	G	Utah Jazz	78	1,134	14.54	
1990–91	John Stockton* (4) (Note: John Stockton holds the all-time record for total assists in a single season.)	G	Utah Jazz	82	1,164	14.20	
1991–92	John Stockton* (5)	G	Utah Jazz	82	1,126	13.73	
1992–93	John Stockton* (6)	G	Utah Jazz	82	987	12.04	
1993–94	John Stockton* (7)	G	Utah Jazz	82	1,031	12.57	
1994–95	John Stockton* (8)	G	Utah Jazz	82	1,011	12.33	
1995–96	John Stockton* (9)	G	Utah Jazz	82	916	11.17	
1996–97	Mark Jackson	G	Denver Nuggets; Indiana Pacers	82	935	11.40	
1997–98	Rod Strickland	G	Washington Wizards	76	801	10.54	
1998–99 (Note: The 1998–99 season was shortened to 50 games due to the league's lockout. The qualification of this season's assist title is to appear in at least 43 games (out of 50) or to have at least 244 assists.)	Jason Kidd*	G	Phoenix Suns	50	539	10.78	
1999–00	Jason Kidd* (2) (Note: In the 1999–2000 season, Jason Kidd had only played in 67 games and ranked fifth in assist total. Gary Payton had the highest total (732).)	G	Phoenix Suns	67	678	10.12	
2000–01	Jason Kidd* (3)	G	Phoenix Suns	77	753	9.78	
2001–02	Andre Miller	G	Cleveland Cavaliers	81	882	10.89	
2002–03	Jason Kidd* (4)	G	New Jersey Nets	80	711	8.89	
2003–04	Jason Kidd* (5) (Note: In the 2003–04 season, Stephon Marbury and Steve Nash both had higher assist totals (719 and 687 respectively) but they ranked second and third in assist average (8.9 and 8.8), respectively.)	G	New Jersey Nets	67	618	9.22	
2004–05 ‡	Steve Nash	G	Phoenix Suns	75	861	11.48	
2005–06 ‡	Steve Nash* (2)	G	Phoenix Suns	79	826	10.46	
2006–07	Steve Nash* (3)	G	Phoenix Suns	76	884	11.63	
2007–08	Chris Paul^{†}	G	New Orleans Hornets	80	925	11.56	
2008–09	Chris Paul^{†} (2)	G	New Orleans Hornets	78	861	11.04	
2009–10	Steve Nash* (4)	G	Phoenix Suns	81	892	11.01	
2010–11	Steve Nash* (5)	G	Phoenix Suns	74	845	11.42	
2011–12 (Note: The 2011–12 season was shortened to 66 games due to the league's lockout. The qualification of this season's assist title is to appear in at least 56 games (out of 66) or to have at least 321 assists.)	Rajon Rondo (Note: In the 2011–12 season, Steve Nash had the highest assist total (664) but was second in assist average (10.7).)	G	Boston Celtics	53	620	11.70	
2012–13	Rajon Rondo (2) (Note: In the 2012–13 season, Greivis Vásquez had the highest assist total (704) but was third in assist average (9.0).)	G	Boston Celtics	38	420	11.05	
2013–14	Chris Paul^{†} (3) (Note: In the 2013–14 season, John Wall, Ricky Rubio, Stephen Curry all had higher assist totals (721, 703 and 666 respectively) but they were tied for second, ranked fifth and sixth in assist average (8.8, 8.6 and 8.5), respectively.)	G	Los Angeles Clippers	62	663	10.69	
2014–15	Chris Paul^{†} (4)	G	Los Angeles Clippers	82	838	10.20	
2015–16	Rajon Rondo (3)	G	Sacramento Kings	72	839	11.70	
2016–17	James Harden^	G	Houston Rockets	81	907	11.20	
2017–18	Russell Westbrook^{†}	G	Oklahoma City Thunder	80	820	10.25	
2018–19	Russell Westbrook^{†} (2)	G	Oklahoma City Thunder	73	784	10.74	
2019–20	LeBron James^	G	Los Angeles Lakers	67	684	10.21	
2020–21	Russell Westbrook^{†} (3)	G	Washington Wizards	65	763	11.74	
2021–22	Chris Paul^{†} (5) (Note: In the 2021–22 season, Trae Young had the highest assist total (737), but was third in assist average (9.7).)	G	Phoenix Suns	65	702	10.80	
2022–23	James Harden^ (2) (Note: In the 2022–23 season, Trae Young and Nikola Jokić all had higher assist totals (741 and 678 respectively), but they were ranked second and third in assist average (10.2 and 9.8 respectively).)	G	Philadelphia 76ers	58	618	10.66	
2023–24	Tyrese Haliburton^	G	Indiana Pacers	69	752	10.90	
2024–25	Trae Young^	G	Atlanta Hawks	76	880	11.58	
2025–26	Nikola Jokić^	C	Denver Nuggets	65	697	10.72	

== Multiple-time leaders ==
Rank	Player	Team	Times leader	Years
1	John Stockton	Utah Jazz	9	1988, 1989, 1990, 1991, 1992, 1993, 1994, 1995, 1996
2	Bob Cousy	Boston Celtics	8	1953, 1954, 1955, 1956, 1957, 1958, 1959, 1960
3	Oscar Robertson	Cincinnati Royals	6	1961, 1962, 1964, 1965, 1966, 1969
4	Jason Kidd	Phoenix Suns (3) / New Jersey Nets (2)	5	1999, 2000, 2001, 2003, 2004
4	Chris Paul	New Orleans Hornets (2) / Los Angeles Clippers (2) / Phoenix Suns (1)	5	2008, 2009, 2014, 2015, 2022
4	Steve Nash	Phoenix Suns	5	2005, 2006, 2007, 2010, 2011
7	Magic Johnson	Los Angeles Lakers	4	1983, 1984, 1986, 1987
7	Kevin Porter	Washington Bullets (2) / Detroit Pistons (1) / New Jersey Nets (1)	4	1975, 1978, 1979, 1981
9	Rajon Rondo	Boston Celtics (2) / Sacramento Kings (1)	3	2012, 2013, 2016
9	Russell Westbrook	Oklahoma City Thunder (2) / Washington Wizards (1)	3	2018, 2019, 2021
11	James Harden	Houston Rockets (1) / Philadelphia 76ers (1)	2	2017, 2023
11	Andy Phillip	Philadelphia Warriors	2	1951, 1952
11	Guy Rodgers	San Francisco Warriors (1) / Chicago Bulls (1)	2	1963, 1967

== See also ==
- NBA records
- List of NBA career assists leaders
- List of NBA annual scoring leaders
- List of NBA annual 3-point scoring leaders
- List of NBA annual rebounding leaders
- List of NBA annual steals leaders
- List of NBA annual blocks leaders
- List of NBA annual field goal percentage leaders
- List of NBA annual minutes played leaders
