= List of NBA annual 3-point field goal percentage leaders =

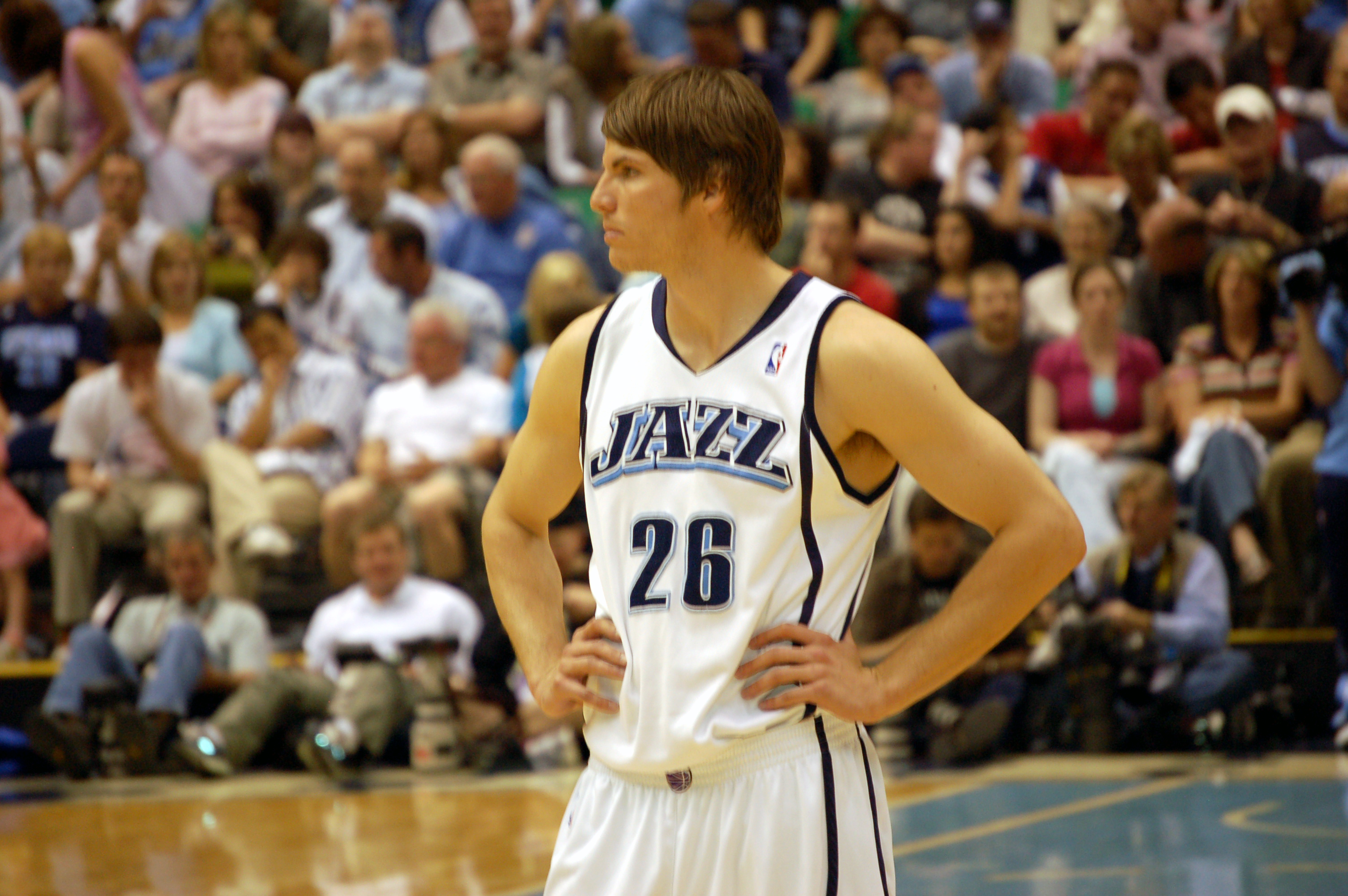
Kyle Korver has both the most seasons leading the league in 3-point field goal percentage and the highest single-season percentage.

In basketball, a three-point field goal (also known as a "3-pointer" or "3-pointer") is a field goal made from beyond the 3-point line, a designated arc radiating from the basket. A successful attempt is worth 3 points, in contrast to the two points awarded for shots made inside the 3-point line. The National Basketball Association's (NBA) 3-point shooting percentage leader is the player with the highest 3-point field goal percentage in a given season. The statistic was first recognized in the 1979–80 NBA season when the 3-point line was first implemented that season. To qualify as a 3-point shooting leader, the player must have at least 82 3-point field goals made. This has been the entry criterion since the 2013–14 NBA season.

Kyle Korver has led the league in 3-point shooting percentage a record four times, Luke Kennard led the league in 3-point shooting percentage three times, while Joe Harris, Craig Hodges, Steve Kerr and Jason Kapono have each done it twice. Jason Kapono and Kyle Korver are the only players to do so in consecutive seasons. Kyle Korver, who shot 53.64% from beyond the arc in 2009–10 NBA season, holds the all-time record for 3-point field goal percentage in a season (min. 110 attempts). Tony Snell, who is not included on the list, shot an all-time high 56.9% from beyond the arc (min. 50 attempts) in 2020–21 NBA season on 62 made and 109 attempts.

None of the leaders in this statistics have been inducted into the Naismith Memorial Basketball Hall of Fame.

== Annual leaders ==
Key
^		Denotes player who is still active in the NBA			
*		Inducted into the Naismith Memorial Basketball Hall of Fame			
Player (X)		Denotes the number of times the player had been the three-point shooting leader up to and including that season			
G	Guard	F	Forward	C	Center

Season	Player	Position (Note: The player's primary position is listed first.)	Team	Games played	3-point field goals made	3-point field goals attempted	3P FG%	Ref.
1979–80	Fred Brown	G	Seattle SuperSonics	80	39	88	.4432	
1980–81	Brian Taylor	G	San Diego Clippers	80	44	115	.3826	
1981–82	Campy Russell	F	New York Knicks	77	25	57	.4386	
1982–83	Mike Dunleavy	G	San Antonio Spurs	79	67	194	.3454	
1983–84	Darrell Griffith	G	Utah Jazz	82	91	252	.3611	
1984–85	Byron Scott	G	Los Angeles Lakers	81	26	60	.4333	
1985–86	Craig Hodges	G	Milwaukee Bucks	66	73	162	.4506	
1986–87	Kiki VanDeWeghe	F	Portland Trail Blazers	79	39	81	.4815	
1987–88	Craig Hodges (2)	G	Milwaukee Bucks; Phoenix Suns	66	86	175	.4914	
1988–89	Jon Sundvold	G	Miami Heat	68	48	92	.5217	
1989–90	Steve Kerr	G	Cleveland Cavaliers	78	73	144	.5069	
1990–91	Jim Les	G	Sacramento Kings	55	71	154	.4610	
1991–92	Dana Barros	G	Seattle SuperSonics	75	83	186	.4462	
1992–93	B. J. Armstrong	G	Chicago Bulls	82	63	139	.4532	
1993–94	Tracy Murray	F	Portland Trail Blazers	66	50	109	.4587	
1994–95	Steve Kerr (2)	G	Chicago Bulls	82	89	170	.5235	
1995–96	Tim Legler	G	Washington Bullets	77	128	245	.5224	
1996–97	Glen Rice	F	Charlotte Hornets	79	207	440	.4705	
1997–98	Dale Ellis	G/F	Seattle SuperSonics	79	127	274	.4635	
1998–99 (Note: The 1998–99 NBA season was shortened to 50 games due to the league's lockout. The qualification of this season's 3-point field goal percentage leader is to have at least 34 3-point field goals made.)	Dell Curry	G	Milwaukee Bucks	42	69	145	.4759	
1999–00	Hubert Davis	G	Dallas Mavericks	79	82	167	.4910	
2000–01	Brent Barry	G	Seattle SuperSonics	67	109	229	.4760	
2001–02	Steve Smith	G	San Antonio Spurs	77	116	246	.4715	
2002–03	Bruce Bowen	F	San Antonio Spurs	82	101	229	.4410	
2003–04	Anthony Peeler	G	Sacramento Kings	75	68	141	.4823	
2004–05	Fred Hoiberg	G	Minnesota Timberwolves	76	70	145	.4828	
2005–06	Richard Hamilton	G/F	Detroit Pistons	80	55	120	.4583	
2006–07	Jason Kapono	F	Miami Heat	66	108	210	.5143	
2007–08	Jason Kapono (2)	F	Toronto Raptors	81	57	118	.4831	
2008–09	Anthony Morrow	G	Golden State Warriors	67	86	184	.4674	
2009–10	Kyle Korver	G/F	Utah Jazz	52	59	110	.5364	
2010–11	Matt Bonner	F/C	San Antonio Spurs	66	105	230	.4565	
2011–12 (Note: The 2011–12 NBA season was shortened to 66 games due to the league's lockout. The qualification of this season's 3-point field goal percentage leader is to have at least 44 3-point field goals made.)	Steve Novak	F	New York Knicks	54	133	282	.4716	
2012–13	José Calderón	G	Toronto Raptors; Detroit Pistons	73	130	282	.4610	
2013–14	Kyle Korver (2)	G/F	Atlanta Hawks	71	185	392	.4719	
2014–15	Kyle Korver (3)	G/F	Atlanta Hawks	75	221	449	.4922	
2015–16	JJ Redick	G	Los Angeles Clippers	75	200	421	.4751	
2016–17	Kyle Korver (4)	G/F	Atlanta Hawks; Cleveland Cavaliers	67	162	359	.4513	
2017–18	Darren Collison	G	Indiana Pacers	69	96	205	.4682	
2018–19	Joe Harris	G	Brooklyn Nets	76	183	386	.4741	
2019–20	George Hill	G	Milwaukee Bucks	59	81	176	.4602	
2020–21	Joe Harris (2)	G	Brooklyn Nets	69	211	444	.4752	
2021–22	Luke Kennard^	G	Los Angeles Clippers	70	190	423	.4492	
2022–23	Luke Kennard^ (2)	G	Los Angeles Clippers; Memphis Grizzlies	59	133	269	.4944	
2023–24	Grayson Allen^	G	Phoenix Suns	75	205	445	.4607	
2024–25	Seth Curry	G	Charlotte Hornets	68	83	182	.4560	
2025–26	Luke Kennard^ (3)	G	Atlanta Hawks; Los Angeles Lakers	78	117	245	.4775	

== Multiple-time leaders ==
Rank	Player	Team	Times leader	Years
1	Kyle Korver	Utah Jazz (1) / Atlanta Hawks (2) / Cleveland Cavaliers (1)	4	2010, 2014, 2015, 2017
2	Luke Kennard	Los Angeles Clippers (1) / Memphis Grizzlies (1) / Los Angeles Lakers (1)	3	2022, 2023, 2026
3	Joe Harris	Brooklyn Nets	2	2019, 2021
3	Craig Hodges	Milwaukee Bucks (1) / Phoenix Suns (1)	2	1986, 1988
3	Jason Kapono	Miami Heat (1) / Toronto Raptors (1)	2	2007, 2008
3	Steve Kerr	Cleveland Cavaliers (1) / Chicago Bulls (1)	2	1990, 1995

== See also ==
- NBA records
- List of NBA career 3-point field goal percentage leaders
- List of NBA career free throw percentage leaders
- List of NBA annual 3-point scoring leaders
- List of NBA annual field goal percentage leaders
