= List of NBA annual 3-point scoring leaders =

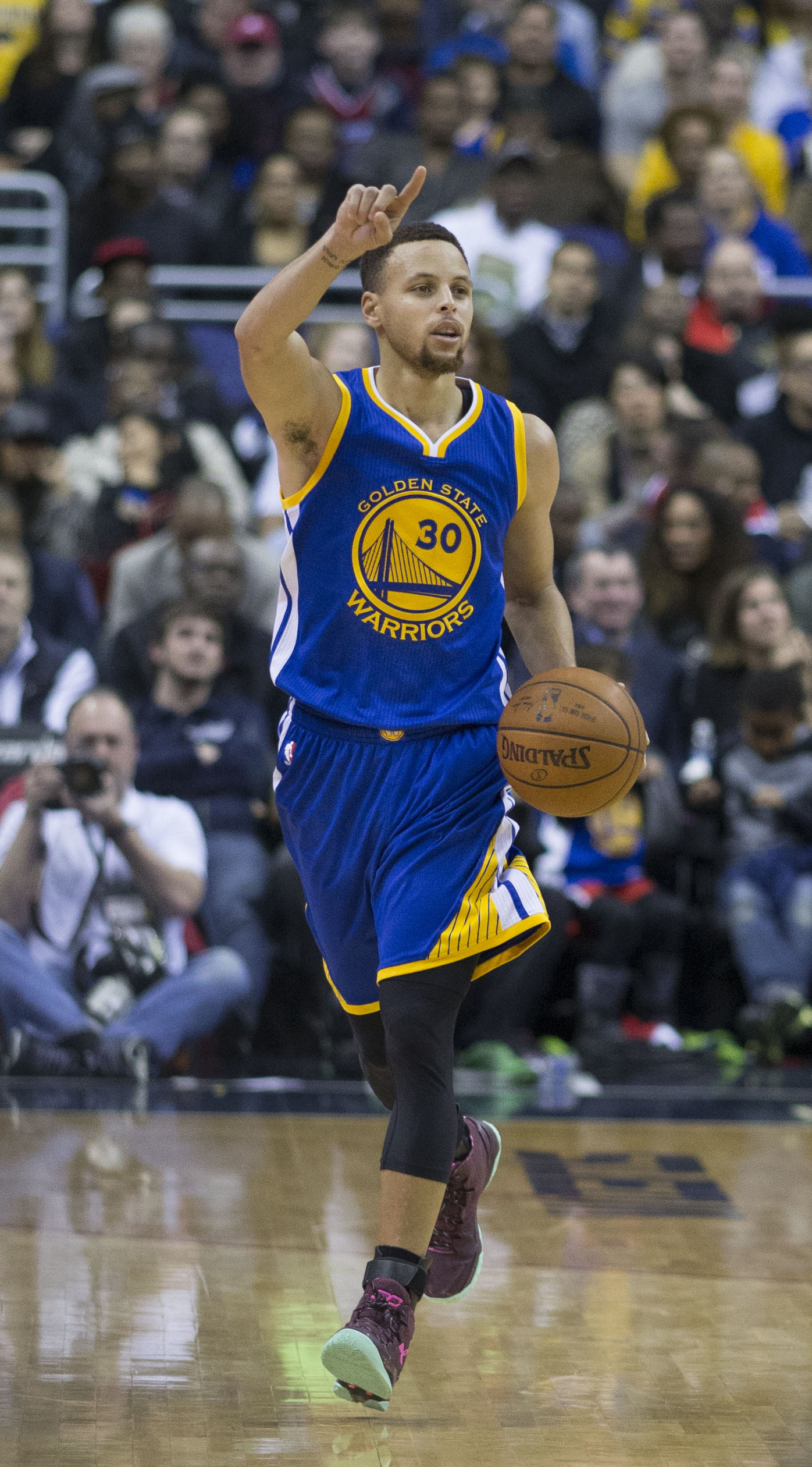
Stephen Curry has led the league in 3-point field goals a record eight times. He set the NBA record for 3-pointers made in 2015–16 NBA season with 402.

In basketball, a three-point field goal (also known as a "3-pointer") is a field goal made from beyond the 3-point line, a designated arc radiating from the basket. A successful attempt is worth 3 points, in contrast to the two points awarded for shots made inside the 3-point line. The National Basketball Association's (NBA) three-point scoring title is the player who recorded the most 3-point field goals in a given season. The statistics was first recognized in the 1979–80 NBA season, when the 3-point line was first implemented.

Stephen Curry holds the record for most 3-point field goals made in single season (402) and 3-point field goal percentage in single season (.4537), accomplishing both in the 2015–16 season. James Harden holds the record for most 3-point field goals attempted in single season (1,028) which was accomplished in 2018–19 NBA season.

Stephen Curry has won the most 3-point scoring titles, with eight, while James Harden and Ray Allen have each won it three times. Michael Adams, Larry Bird, Darrell Griffith, Dan Majerle, Vernon Maxwell and Reggie Miller have each won it two times. Stephen Curry also holds the record for consecutive seasons leading the league in 3-point scoring with 5, which was accomplished in 2012–13 NBA season, 2013–14 NBA season, 2014–15 NBA season, 2015–16 NBA season and 2016–17 NBA season. He also had two consecutive seasons leading the league in 3-point scoring, which was accomplished in 2020–21 NBA season and 2021–22 NBA season. James Harden had three consecutive seasons leading the league in 3-point scoring, which he had in 2017–18 NBA season, 2018–19 NBA season and 2019–20 NBA season. Other players to have consecutive seasons leading the league in 3-point scoring include Ray Allen in 2001–02 NBA season and 2002–03 NBA season, Dan Majerle in 1992–93 NBA season and 1993–94 NBA season, Vernon Maxwell in 1990–91 NBA season and 1991–92 NBA season, Michael Adams in 1988–89 NBA season and 1989–90 season, Larry Bird in 1985–86 NBA season and 1986–87 NBA season and Darrell Griffith in 1983–84 NBA season and 1984–85 NBA season.

== Key ==
^		Denotes player who is still active in the NBA			
*		Inducted into the Naismith Memorial Basketball Hall of Fame			
Player (X)		Denotes the number of times the player had been the three-point field goals leader up to and including that season			
G	Guard	F	Forward	C	Center

== List of 3-point scoring leaders ==
Season	Player	Position (Note: The player's primary position is listed first.)	Team	Games played	3-point field goals made	3-point field goals attempted	3-point field goal %	Ref.
1979–80	Brian Taylor	G	San Diego Clippers	78	90	239	.3766	
1980–81	Mike Bratz	G	Cleveland Cavaliers	80	57	169	.3373	
1981–82	Don Buse	G	Indiana Pacers	82	78	193	.4041	
1982–83	Mike Dunleavy	G	San Antonio Spurs	79	67	194	.3454	
1983–84	Darrell Griffith	G	Utah Jazz	82	91	252	.3611	
1984–85	Darrell Griffith (2)	G	Utah Jazz	78	92	257	.3580	
1985–86	Larry Bird*	F	Boston Celtics	82	82	196	.4184	
1986–87	Larry Bird* (2)	F	Boston Celtics	74	90	225	.4000	
1987–88	Danny Ainge	G	Boston Celtics	81	148	357	.4146	
1988–89	Michael Adams	G	Denver Nuggets	77	166	466	.3562	
1989–90	Michael Adams (2)	G	Denver Nuggets	79	158	432	.3657	
1990–91	Vernon Maxwell	G	Houston Rockets	82	172	510	.3373	
1991–92	Vernon Maxwell (2)	G	Houston Rockets	80	162	473	.3425	
1992–93	Dan Majerle	G/F	Phoenix Suns	82	167	438	.3813	
1992–93	Reggie Miller*	G	Indiana Pacers	82	167	419	.3986	
1993–94	Dan Majerle (2)	G/F	Phoenix Suns	80	192	503	.3817	
1994–95	John Starks	G	New York Knicks	80	217	611	.3552	
1995–96	Dennis Scott	F	Orlando Magic	82	267	628	.4252	
1996–97	Reggie Miller* (2)	G	Indiana Pacers	81	229	536	.4272	
1997–98	Wesley Person	G	Cleveland Cavaliers	82	192	447	.4295	
1998–99 (Note: The 1998–99 NBA season was shortened to 50 games due to the league's lockout.)	Dee Brown	G	Toronto Raptors	49	135	349	.3868	
1999–00	Gary Payton*	G	Seattle SuperSonics	82	177	520	.3404	
2000–01	Antoine Walker	F	Boston Celtics	81	221	603	.3665	
2001–02	Ray Allen*	G	Milwaukee Bucks	69	229	528	.4337	
2002–03	Ray Allen* (2)	G	Milwaukee Bucks; Seattle SuperSonics	76	201	533	.3771	
2003–04	Peja Stojaković	F	Sacramento Kings	81	240	554	.4332	
2004–05	Quentin Richardson	G	Phoenix Suns	79	226	631	.3582	
2004–05	Kyle Korver	G/F	Philadelphia 76ers	82	226	558	.4050	
2005–06	Ray Allen* (3)	G	Seattle SuperSonics	78	269	653	.4119	
2006–07	Gilbert Arenas	G	Washington Wizards	74	205	584	.3510	
2006–07	Raja Bell	G	Phoenix Suns	78	205	496	.4133	
2007–08	Jason Richardson	G	Charlotte Bobcats	82	243	599	.4057	
2008–09	Rashard Lewis	F	Orlando Magic	79	220	554	.3971	
2009–10	Aaron Brooks	G	Houston Rockets	82	209	525	.3981	
2010–11	Dorell Wright	F	Golden State Warriors	82	194	516	.3780	
2011–12 (Note: The 2011–12 NBA season was shortened to 66 games due to the league's lockout.)	Ryan Anderson	F	Orlando Magic	61	166	422	.3934	
2012–13	Stephen Curry^	G	Golden State Warriors	78	272	600	.4533	
2013–14	Stephen Curry^ (2)	G	Golden State Warriors	78	261	615	.4244	
2014–15	Stephen Curry^ (3)	G	Golden State Warriors	80	286	646	.4427	
2015–16	Stephen Curry^ (4)	G	Golden State Warriors	79	402	886	.4537	
2016–17	Stephen Curry^ (5)	G	Golden State Warriors	79	324	789	.4106	
2017–18	James Harden^	G	Houston Rockets	72	265	722	.3670	
2018–19	James Harden^ (2)	G	Houston Rockets	78	378	1,028	.3677	
2019–20	James Harden^ (3)	G	Houston Rockets	68	299	843	.3547	
2020–21	Stephen Curry^ (6)	G	Golden State Warriors	63	337	801	.4207	
2021–22	Stephen Curry^ (7)	G	Golden State Warriors	64	285	750	.3800	
2022–23	Klay Thompson^	G	Golden State Warriors	69	301	731	.4118	
2023–24	Stephen Curry^ (8)	G	Golden State Warriors	74	357	876	.4075	
2024–25	Anthony Edwards^	G	Minnesota Timberwolves	79	320	811	.3946	
2025–26	Kon Knueppel^	SF/SG	Charlotte Hornets	81	273	642	.4250	

== Multiple-time leaders ==
Rank	Player	Team	Times leader	Years
1	Stephen Curry	Golden State Warriors	8	2013, 2014, 2015, 2016, 2017, 2021, 2022, 2024
2	James Harden	Houston Rockets	3	2018, 2019, 2020
2	Ray Allen	Milwaukee Bucks (1.5) / Seattle SuperSonics (1.5)	3	2002, 2003, 2006
4	Reggie Miller	Indiana Pacers	2	1993, 1998
4	Dan Majerle	Phoenix Suns	2	1993, 1994
4	Vernon Maxwell	Houston Rockets	2	1991, 1992
4	Michael Adams	Denver Nuggets	2	1989, 1990
4	Larry Bird	Boston Celtics	2	1986, 1987
4	Darrell Griffith	Utah Jazz	2	1984, 1985

== See also ==
- NBA records
- List of NBA career 3-point scoring leaders
- List of NBA annual 3-point field goal percentage leaders
- List of NBA career 3-point field goal percentage leaders
- List of NBA annual field goal percentage leaders
