= Cody Martin (basketball) =

American basketball player (born 1995)

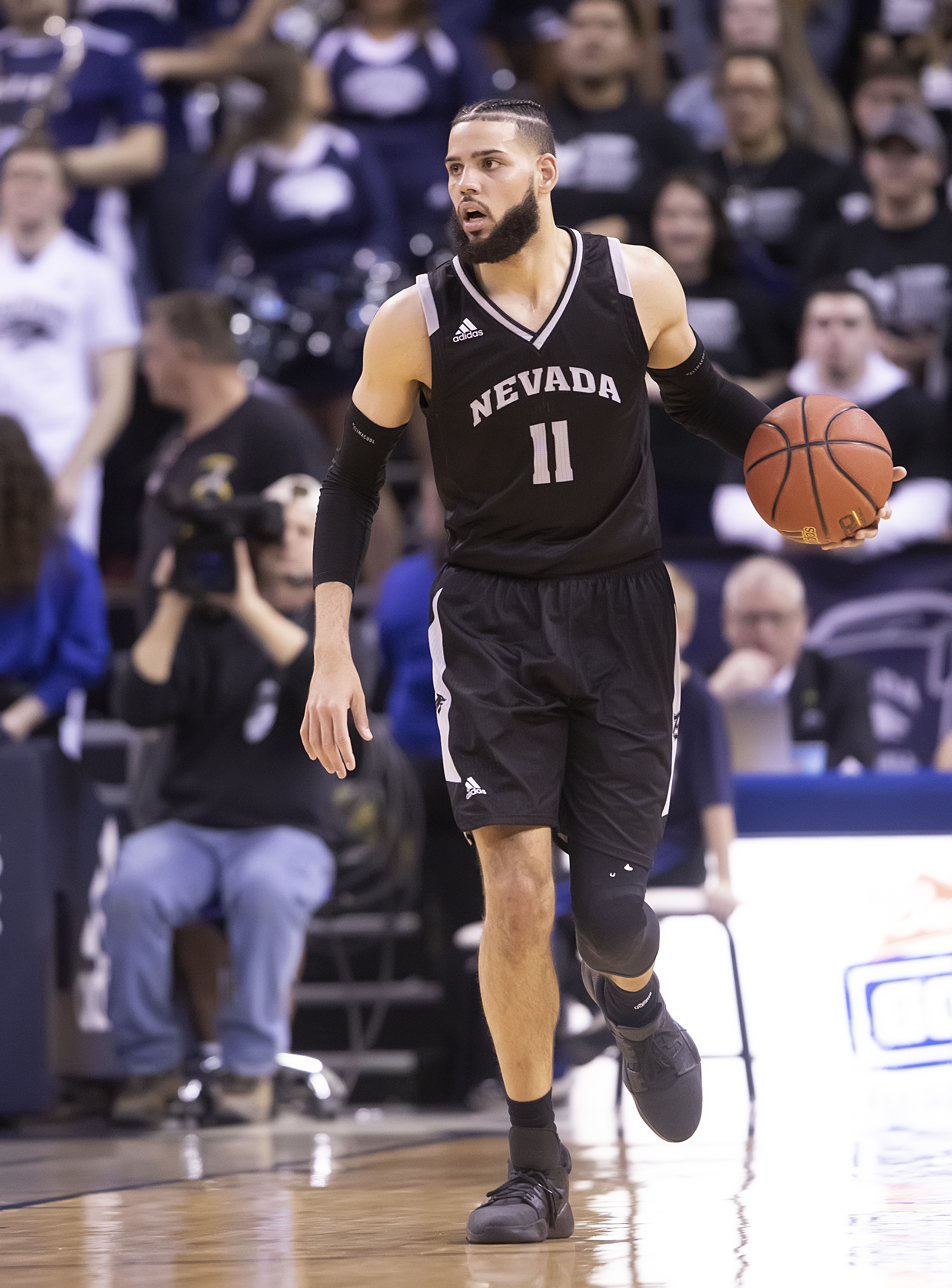
- Cody Martin 2019

Free agent
- Position: Small forward

Personal information
- Born: September 28, 1995 (age 31) Winston-Salem, North Carolina, U.S.
- Listed height: 6 ft 6 in (1.98 m)
- Listed weight: 205 lb (93 kg)

Career information
- High school: Davie County (Mocksville, North Carolina); Oak Hill Academy (Mouth of Wilson, Virginia)
- College: NC State (2014–2016); Nevada (2017–2019)
- NBA draft: 2019: 2nd round, 36th overall pick
- Drafted by: Charlotte Hornets
- Playing career: 2019–present

Career history
- 2019–2025: Charlotte Hornets
- 2019: →Greensboro Swarm
- 2025: Phoenix Suns
- 2025: Indiana Pacers
- 2025–2026: Noblesville Boom

Career highlights
- Second-team All-Mountain West (2018); Third-team All-Mountain West (2019); Mountain West Defensive Player of the Year (2018)
- Stats at NBA.com
- Stats at Basketball Reference

Cody Lee Martin (born September 28, 1995) is an American professional basketball player who last played for the Noblesville Boom of the NBA G League. He played college basketball for the NC State Wolfpack and the Nevada Wolf Pack. He is the identical twin brother of Caleb Martin. He was drafted by the Charlotte Hornets in the second round of the 2019 NBA draft.

== High school career ==
Martin played basketball for prep powerhouse Oak Hill Academy with his twin brother Caleb Martin. Prior to playing at Oak Hill, Cody and his brother played three seasons at Davie County High School in Mocksville, North Carolina. He also played football his freshman year of high school. The two chose North Carolina State University over Rutgers and Providence.

== College career ==
As a sophomore at NC State, he averaged 6.0 points, 4.4 rebounds, and 2.3 assists per game. Following that season, the Martin twins chose to transfer to Nevada to play for coach Eric Musselman. After sitting out a season as a redshirt, Cody Martin was named Mountain West Conference defensive player of the year. He averaged 14 points, 6.3 rebounds and 4.7 assists per game and led the Wolf Pack to an NCAA Tournament appearance. After the season, he and his brother declared for the 2018 NBA draft without hiring an agent, thus preserving their ability to return to college. They were also participants for the NBA Draft Combine that year, but both ultimately decided to stay for their senior seasons in Nevada.

Coming into his senior season, Martin was named to the Preseason MWC Team.

== Professional career ==
=== Charlotte Hornets (2019–2025) ===
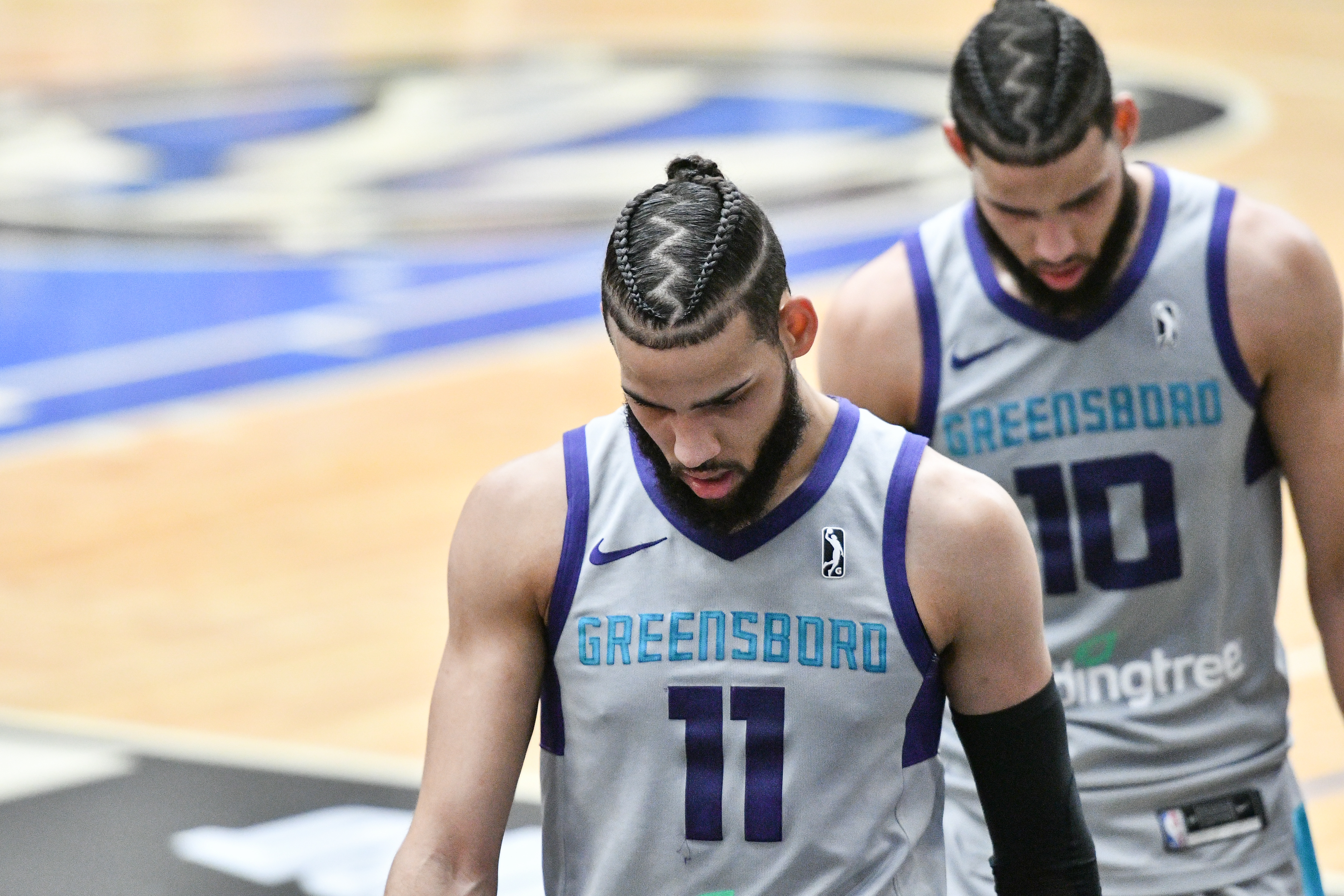
Cody (11) and Caleb Martin in 2019

Martin was selected 36th overall in the 2019 NBA draft by his hometown team, the Charlotte Hornets. On July 31, 2019, Martin signed with the Hornets. On October 25, 2019, Martin made his NBA debut, coming off from bench in a 99–121 loss to the Minnesota Timberwolves with four points, four rebounds, an assist and a steal. On November 29, 2019, Martin received his first assignment to the Hornets' NBA G League affiliate, the Greensboro Swarm. On February 13, 2020, he scored a season-high 13 points, alongside eight rebounds, three assists and three steals, in a 100–112 loss to the Orlando Magic. Martin again scored 13 points, alongside five rebounds, four assists and two steals, in a 103–104 loss to the San Antonio Spurs.

On April 25, 2021, Martin recorded a season-high 13 points, alongside ten rebounds, five assists and two blocks, in a 125–104 win over the Boston Celtics.

On December 15, 2021, Martin scored a career-high 21 points, alongside eight rebounds and three assists, in a 131–115 win over the San Antonio Spurs.

On July 2, 2022, Martin re-signed with the Hornets on a four-year, $32 million contract. He missed four out of the Hornets' five preseason games with left knee tendiopathy. During the Hornets' season-opening 129–102 win over the San Antonio Spurs on October 19, Martin only played 56 seconds before injuring his left quad and exiting the game. On November 11, he underwent an arthroscopic procedure on his left knee and was set to be re-evaluated in four weeks. Martin made his return to the lineup on January 4, 2023, recording four points, four rebounds and two assists in a 131–107 loss to the Memphis Grizzlies.

=== Phoenix Suns (2025) ===
On February 6, 2025, Martin, Vasilije Micić and a 2026 second-round pick were traded to the Phoenix Suns in exchange for center Jusuf Nurkić and a 2026 first-round pick. On June 30, the Suns waived Martin.

=== Indiana Pacers (2025) ===
On November 5, 2025, Martin signed a 10-day contract with the Indiana Pacers.

=== Noblesville Boom (2025–2026) ===
On December 31, 2025, Martin was traded from the Capital City Go-Go to the Noblesville Boom in exchange for the returning player rights to Kaiden Rice, a 2026 first-round pick, and a 2027 second-round pick.

On September 9, 2026, Martin was traded from Noblesville Boom to the Mexico City Capitanes as part of a three-team trade.

== Career statistics ==
Legend
GP	Games played	GS	Games started	MPG	Minutes per game
FG%	Field goal percentage	3P%	3-point field goal percentage	FT%	Free throw percentage
RPG	Rebounds per game	APG	Assists per game	SPG	Steals per game
BPG	Blocks per game	PPG	Points per game	**Bold**	Career high

=== NBA ===
Year	Team	GP	GS	MPG	FG%	3P%	FT%	RPG	APG	SPG	BPG	PPG
2019–20	Charlotte	48	3	18.8	.430	.234	.646	3.3	2.0	.8	.2	5.0
2020–21	Charlotte	52	10	16.3	.441	.276	.581	3.1	1.7	.7	.2	4.0
2021–22	Charlotte	**71**	11	26.3	**.482**	**.384**	.701	4.0	2.5	**1.2**	.5	7.7
2022–23	Charlotte	7	0	19.1	.389	.214	.571	3.4	1.6	.6	.1	5.0
2023–24	Charlotte	28	**22**	**26.9**	.381	.314	.606	3.9	**3.7**	1.1	.6	7.5
2024–25	Charlotte	39	8	24.8	.433	.323	.694	**4.5**	2.3	1.1	**.7**	**7.8**
2024–25	Phoenix	13	0	14.9	.352	.120	**.750**	3.5	1.2	1.0	.5	3.8
2025–26	Indiana	4	0	13.8	.200	.000	.500	3.5	.5	1.0	.5	1.8
Career		263	54	21.8	.434	.305	.658	3.7	2.2	1.0	.4	6.1

=== College ===
Year	Team	GP	GS	MPG	FG%	3P%	FT%	RPG	APG	SPG	BPG	PPG
2014–15	NC State	19	3	11.4	.475	.000	.529	2.0	1.2	0.5	0.3	3.4
2015–16	NC State	33	16	25.9	.467	**.429**	.597	4.4	2.3	1.2	0.4	6.0
2017–18	Nevada	**36**	**34**	**35.7**	**.516**	.294	.701	**6.3**	4.7	**1.7**	**1.5**	**14.0**
2018–19	Nevada	34	**34**	34.4	.505	.358	**.763**	4.5	**4.9**	1.4	0.7	12.1
Career		122	87	28.9	.501	.325	.689	4.6	3.6	1.3	0.8	9.7
