= P. J. Washington =

American basketball player (born 1998)

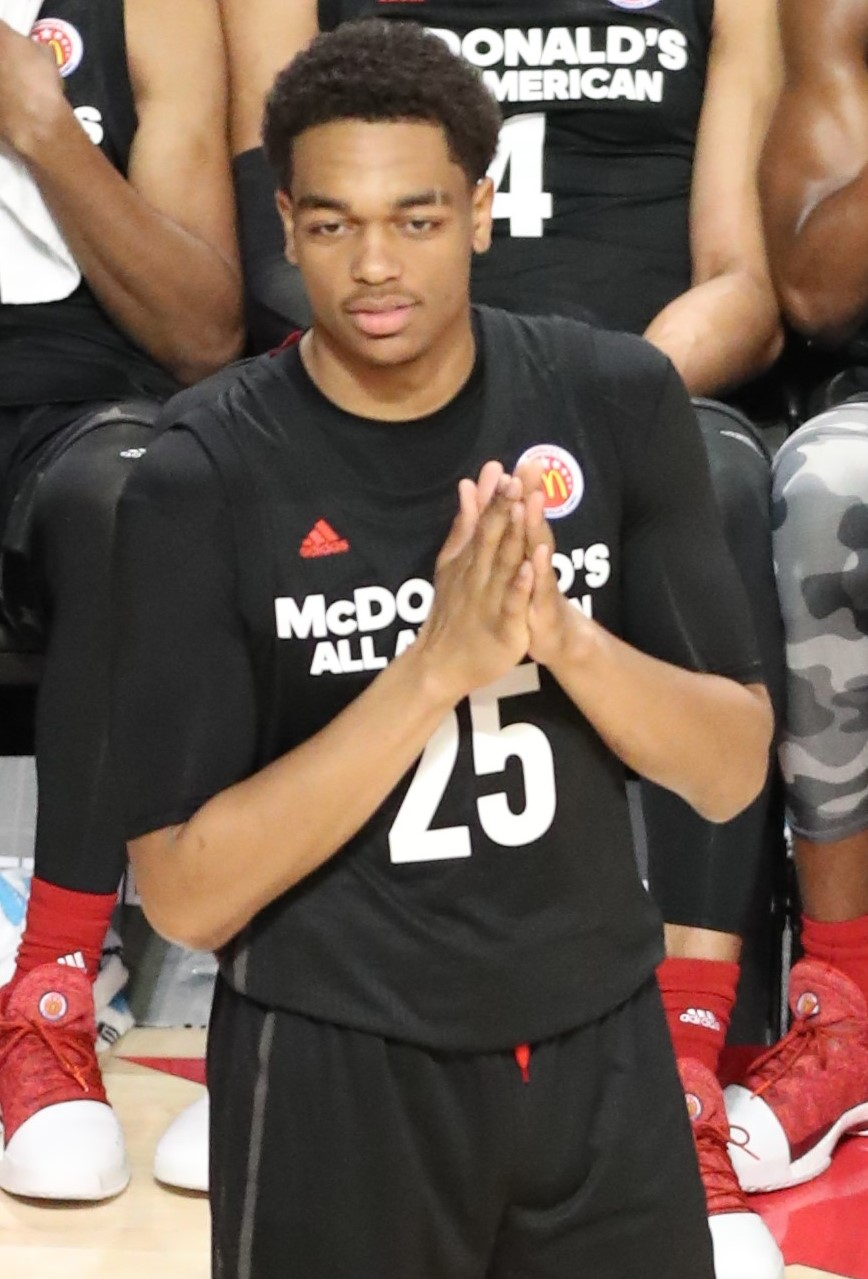
- Washington at the 2017 McDonald's All-American Game

No. 25 – Dallas Mavericks
- Position: Power forward / small forward
- League: NBA

Personal information
- Born: August 23, 1998 (age 28) Louisville, Kentucky, U.S.
- Listed height: 6 ft 6 in (1.98 m)
- Listed weight: 230 lb (104 kg)

Career information
- High school: Prime Prep (Dallas, Texas); Lone Star (Frisco, Texas); Findlay Prep (Henderson, Nevada)
- College: Kentucky (2017–2019)
- NBA draft: 2019: 1st round, 12th overall pick
- Drafted by: Charlotte Hornets
- Playing career: 2019–present

Career history
- 2019–2024: Charlotte Hornets
- 2024–present: Dallas Mavericks

Career highlights
- NBA All-Rookie Second Team (2020); Third-team All-American – AP, NABC, USBWA, SN (2019); First-team All-SEC (2019); McDonald's All-American (2017)
- Stats at NBA.com
- Stats at Basketball Reference
Medals
Men's basketball
Representing the United States
FIBA Under-19 World Cup
| Bronze medal – third place | 2017 Egypt | Team |
FIBA Americas U18 Championship
| Gold medal – first place | 2016 Chile | Team |

Paul Jamaine Washington Jr. (born August 23, 1998) is an American professional basketball player for the Dallas Mavericks of the National Basketball Association (NBA). He played college basketball for the Kentucky Wildcats.

After being selected by the Charlotte Hornets in the first round of the 2019 NBA draft with the 12th overall pick, he was named to the NBA All-Rookie Second Team in 2020. Washington was traded to the Mavericks at the trade deadline in February 2024, helping the team reach the 2024 NBA Finals.

== Early life ==
Washington was born in Louisville, Kentucky. His family moved to St. Louis and Chicago before settling in Frisco, Texas. Washington attended Prime Prep Academy in Dallas after a brief stint at Lone Star High School in Frisco, before transferring to Findlay Prep in Henderson, Nevada, where he joined fellow five-star recruits Allonzo Trier and Derryck Thornton. As junior, he averaged 16.8 points, 9.5 rebounds and 4.0 assists per game. After his junior season, Washington suited up for his AAU team, Team Penny, sponsored by former NBA All-Star Penny Hardaway, on the Nike EYBL circuit. As a senior, Washington averaged 19.6 points, 9.4 rebounds and 6.1 assists per game. Washington was selected to both the 2017 Jordan Brand Classic and McDonald's All-American Game.

=== Recruiting ===
Washington was rated as a five-star recruit and the No. 12 overall recruit and No. 3 power forward in the 2017 high school class by Scout.com, Rivals.com and ESPN. On November 10, 2016, he committed to Kentucky, signing his letter of intent on November 20.

College recruiting
| Name | Hometown | School | Height | Weight | Commit date |
|---|---|---|---|---|---|
| P. J. Washington; PF | Frisco, Texas | Findlay Prep (NV) | 6 ft 8 in (2.03 m) | 230 lb (100 kg) | Nov 10, 2016 |
| P. J. Washington; PF | Recruit ratings: Scout: Rivals: 247Sports: ESPN: (95) | | | | |
Overall recruit ranking: Scout: #13 Rivals: #11 247Sports: #13 ESPN: #11
Note: In many cases, Scout, Rivals, 247Sports, On3, and ESPN may conflict in their listings of height and weight.; In these cases, the average was taken. ESPN grades are on a 100-point scale.; Sources: "Kentucky 2017 Basketball Commitments". Rivals.; "2017 Kentucky Basketball Commits". Scout.; "Scout.com Team Recruiting Rankings". Scout.; "2017 Team Ranking". Rivals.; "2017 Kentucky 24/7 Sports Commits". 247Sports.

== College career ==
Throughout most of his freshman season at Kentucky, Washington played through a pinkie injury that required surgery in the summer. In the NCAA Tournament loss to Kansas State, Washington led Kentucky with 18 points and 15 rebounds. Washington averaged 10.8 points and 5.7 rebounds per game as a freshman. After the season, he declared for the NBA draft, but announced his return on May 30, 2018.

Following Kentucky's loss to Auburn in the 2019 NCAA men's basketball tournament, Washington announced his intention to forgo his final two seasons of collegiate eligibility and declare for the 2019 NBA draft, where he was projected to be a first-round selection.

== Professional career ==
=== Charlotte Hornets (2019–2024) ===
Washington was selected as the 12th overall pick by the Charlotte Hornets in the 2019 NBA draft. On July 3, 2019, Washington officially signed with the Hornets and on October 23 he made his debut in NBA, started in a 126–125 win over the Chicago Bulls with 27 points, 4 rebounds, an assist, a steal and a block. He also made 7 three-pointers, the most in an NBA debut in NBA history. On October 31, he scored 23 points and 8 rebounds in a 118–111 win over the Sacramento Kings. On November 29, Washington put up 26 points and 5 rebounds in a 110–107 victory against the Detroit Pistons. On September 15, 2020, Washington was named 2019–20 NBA All-Rookie Second Team by the NBA.

On February 28, 2021, Washington scored a then career-high 42 points to help the Charlotte Hornets win over the Sacramento Kings. On March 28, 2023, he scored a career-high 43 points in a 137–134 win over the Oklahoma City Thunder. On August 29, Washington re-signed with the Hornets on a 3-year, $48 million contract. On January 27, 2024, Washington tied his career-high 43 points in a 134–122 loss to the Utah Jazz.

=== Dallas Mavericks (2024–present) ===
On February 8, 2024, Washington was traded, alongside two future second–round picks, to the Dallas Mavericks in exchange for Seth Curry, Grant Williams, and a 2027 first–round pick that is top 2 protected. On February 10, Washington made his Mavericks debut, putting up 14 points, five rebounds, and one steal in a 146–111 win over the Oklahoma City Thunder. On April 5, Washington put up 32 points alongside a game-winner in a 108–106 win over the Golden State Warriors. On April 26, in Game 3 of the first round of the playoffs against the Los Angeles Clippers during a 101–90 win, Washington was ejected after being involved in a confrontation with Russell Westbrook. On May 11, in Game 3 of the Western Conference Semifinals, Washington led the Mavericks with 27 points during a 105–101 win over the Oklahoma City Thunder. In Game 6, Washington was fouled on a three-point attempt by Shai Gilgeous-Alexander with 2.5 seconds to go. He sunk the first two free throws to put the Mavericks up by 1 and intentionally missed the third. Jalen Williams subsequently missed a half court shot, and the Mavericks beat the Thunder in a 117–116 victory to advance to the Western Conference Finals. Washington helped the Mavericks reach the 2024 NBA Finals where they lost to the Boston Celtics in five games.

On December 27, 2024, Washington was involved in an altercation with Jusuf Nurkić. The next day, Washington was suspended for a game due to the altercation.

On September 10, 2025, Washington signed a four-year, $88.76 million extension with the Mavericks that runs through the 2029–30 season.

== Career statistics ==
Legend
| GP | Games played | GS | Games started | MPG | Minutes per game |
| FG% | Field goal percentage | 3P% | 3-point field goal percentage | FT% | Free throw percentage |
| RPG | Rebounds per game | APG | Assists per game | SPG | Steals per game |
| BPG | Blocks per game | PPG | Points per game | **Bold** | Career high |
| * | Led the league |

=== NBA ===
==== Regular season ====
| Year | Team | GP | GS | MPG | FG% | 3P% | FT% | RPG | APG | SPG | BPG | PPG |
|---|---|---|---|---|---|---|---|---|---|---|---|---|
| 2019–20 | Charlotte | 58 | 57 | 30.3 | .455 | .374 | .647 | 5.4 | 2.1 | .9 | .8 | 12.2 |
| 2020–21 | Charlotte | 64 | 61 | 30.5 | .440 | **.386** | **.745** | 6.5 | **2.5** | 1.1 | **1.2** | 12.9 |
| 2021–22 | Charlotte | 65 | 28 | 27.2 | **.470** | .365 | .716 | 5.2 | 2.3 | .9 | .9 | 10.3 |
| 2022–23 | Charlotte | **73** | **73** | **32.6** | .444 | .348 | .730 | 4.9 | 2.4 | .9 | 1.1 | **15.7** |
| 2023–24 | Charlotte | 44 | 17 | 29.2 | .446 | .324 | .713 | 5.3 | 2.2 | .9 | .7 | 13.6 |
| 2023–24 | Dallas | 29 | 28 | 32.2 | .421 | .314 | .627 | 6.2 | 1.5 | **1.2** | .9 | 11.7 |
| 2024–25 | Dallas | 57 | 56 | 32.2 | .453 | .381 | .722 | **7.8** | 2.3 | 1.1 | 1.1 | 14.7 |
| 2025–26 | Dallas | 56 | 53 | 31.0 | .450 | .325 | .687 | 7.0 | 1.8 | 1.0 | 1.1 | 14.2 |
| Career | | 446 | 373 | 30.6 | .448 | .354 | .705 | 6.0 | 2.2 | 1.0 | 1.0 | 13.3 |

==== Playoffs ====
| Year | Team | GP | GS | MPG | FG% | 3P% | FT% | RPG | APG | SPG | BPG | PPG |
|---|---|---|---|---|---|---|---|---|---|---|---|---|
| 2024 | Dallas | 22* | 22* | 35.7 | .427 | .348 | .709 | 6.6 | 1.4 | .7 | .8 | 13.0 |
| Career | | 22 | 22 | 35.7 | .427 | .348 | .709 | 6.6 | 1.4 | .7 | .8 | 13.0 |

=== College ===
| Year | Team | GP | GS | MPG | FG% | 3P% | FT% | RPG | APG | SPG | BPG | PPG |
|---|---|---|---|---|---|---|---|---|---|---|---|---|
| 2017–18 | Kentucky | **37** | 30 | 27.4 | .519 | .238 | .606 | 5.7 | 1.5 | **.8** | .8 | 10.8 |
| 2018–19 | Kentucky | 35 | **33** | **29.3** | **.522** | **.423** | **.663** | **7.5** | **1.8** | **.8** | **1.2** | **15.2** |
| Career | | 72 | 63 | 28.3 | .521 | .384 | .632 | 6.6 | 1.7 | .8 | 1.0 | 12.9 |

== Personal life ==
Washington's parents met at Middle Tennessee State, where they both played basketball. Upon graduation, his father became a General Manager at a car sales company and coached his middle school team, while his mother went on to become a teacher at his middle school. Washington has a brother, Spencer, and a sister, Alexandria.

Washington married Alisah Chanel in October 2023, with whom he has a son, named Preston. He also has a son named Paul Jamaine Washington III, born in 2021 with Brittany Renner.
