= Nate Darling =

Canadian basketball player (born 1998)

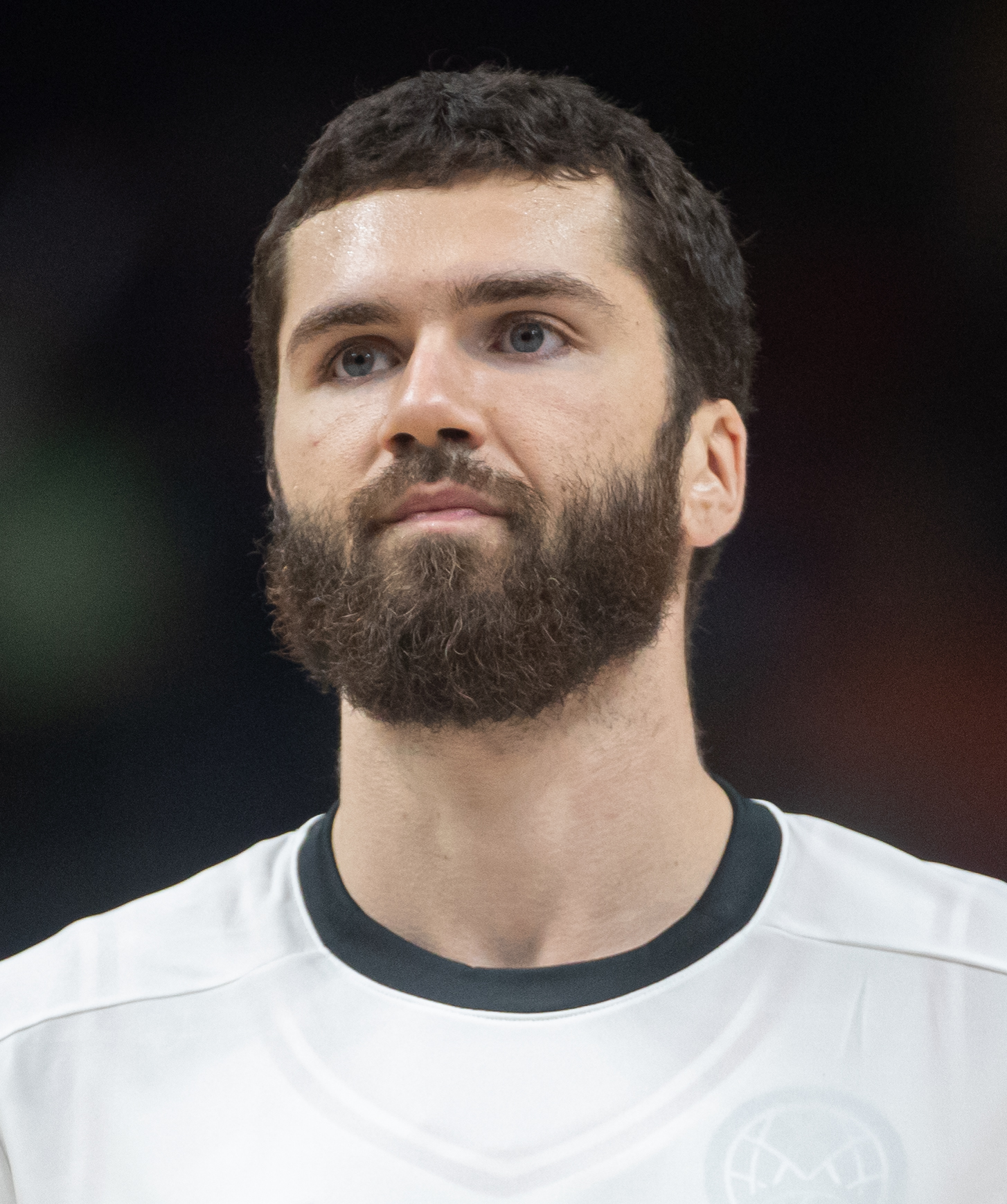
- Darling in 2025

No. 8 – Bilbao Basket
- Position: Shooting guard
- League: Liga ACB

Personal information
- Born: August 30, 1998 (age 28) Halifax, Nova Scotia, Canada
- Listed height: 6 ft 5 in (1.96 m)
- Listed weight: 200 lb (91 kg)

Career information
- High school: DeMatha Catholic (Hyattsville, Maryland)
- College: UAB (2016–2018); Delaware (2019–2020)
- NBA draft: 2020: undrafted
- Playing career: 2020–present

Career history
- 2020–2021: Charlotte Hornets
- 2021: →Greensboro Swarm
- 2021–2025: Agua Caliente / Ontario / San Diego Clippers
- 2025–2026: Élan Chalon
- 2026–present: Bilbao Basket

Career highlights
- First-team All-CAA (2020)
- Stats at NBA.com
- Stats at Basketball Reference
Medals
Men's basketball
Representing Canada
FIBA Under-19 World Cup
Gold medal – first place	2017 Egypt	National team
FIBA Americas U18 Championship
Silver medal – second place	2016 Chile	National team

Nathan Joseph Darling (born August 30, 1998) is a Canadian professional basketball player for Bilbao Basket of the Liga ACB. He played college basketball for the UAB Blazers and the Delaware Fightin' Blue Hens. He is the first and only Blue Hens player in NBA history.

== High school career ==
Darling attended DeMatha Catholic High School and was teammates with top recruit Markelle Fultz and football star Chase Young.

== College career ==
Darling began his collegiate career at UAB and averaged 2.5 points per game. As a sophomore, he averaged 10.1 points per game while shooting 40.9 percent on three-pointers. Following the season, he decided to transfer to the University of Delaware. On December 14, 2019, Darling scored a game-high 29 points against 20th-ranked Villanova in a 78–70 loss, after which his head coach Martin Ingelsby said he was playing like one of the best guards in college basketball. As a junior, Darling averaged 21 points per game. He earned first-team All-Colonial Athletic Association (CAA) honors. After the season, he declared for the 2020 NBA draft while retaining college eligibility. However, on August 3 he announced he was remaining in the draft and turning professional.

== Professional career ==
=== Charlotte Hornets (2020–2021) ===
After going undrafted in the 2020 NBA draft, Darling signed a two-way contract with the Charlotte Hornets. Under the terms of the deal, he will split time between the Hornets and their NBA G League affiliate, the Greensboro Swarm. This united him with Canadian assistant coach Jay Triano.

He made his NBA debut on March 13, 2021, against the Toronto Raptors, hitting a three-pointer in the fourth quarter, and became the first Nova Scotia born player in NBA history.

=== Agua Caliente / Ontario / San Diego Clippers (2021–present) ===
On October 16, 2021, Darling was signed by the Los Angeles Clippers, but was waived shortly thereafter. On October 23, he was selected by the Agua Caliente Clippers fifth overall in the 2021 NBA G League draft.

On February 17, 2023, Darling signed a two-way contract with the Los Angeles Clippers. He was waived four days later without having played a game for the NBA team. On February 23, he was reacquired by the Ontario Clippers.

On October 9, 2023, Darling signed with the Los Angeles Clippers, but was waived on October 20, prior to the start of the 2023–24 season. Ten days later, he rejoined the Ontario Clippers.

On September 20, 2024, Darling signed with the Los Angeles Clippers, but was waived on October 12. On October 28, he rejoined the San Diego Clippers.

On August 5, 2025, he signed with Elan Chalon of the French LNB Pro A.

On June 19, 2026, he signed with Bilbao Basket of the Liga ACB.

== Career statistics ==
Legend
GP	Games played	GS	Games started	MPG	Minutes per game
FG%	Field goal percentage	3P%	3-point field goal percentage	FT%	Free throw percentage
RPG	Rebounds per game	APG	Assists per game	SPG	Steals per game
BPG	Blocks per game	PPG	Points per game	**Bold**	Career high

=== NBA ===
==== Regular season ====
Year	Team	GP	GS	MPG	FG%	3P%	FT%	RPG	APG	SPG	BPG	PPG
2020–21	Charlotte	7	0	3.7	.286	.286	1.000	.1	.1	.0	.1	1.3
Career		7	0	3.7	.286	.286	1.000	.1	.1	.0	.1	1.3

=== College ===
Year	Team	GP	GS	MPG	FG%	3P%	FT%	RPG	APG	SPG	BPG	PPG
2016–17	UAB	30	1	9.4	**.491**	**.462**	.500	.5	.5	.1	.0	2.5
2017–18	UAB	**33**	31	28.0	.477	.409	.830	3.0	**2.8**	.4	**.3**	10.1
2018–19	Delaware	Redshirt										
2019–20	Delaware	32	**32**	**38.3**	.446	.399	**.854**	**3.9**	**2.8**	**.8**	.2	**21.0**
Career		95	64	25.6	.459	.408	.841	2.5	2.1	.4	.2	11.4
