= 2020–21 Charlotte Hornets season =

NBA professional basketball team season

- Head coach: James Borrego
- General manager: Mitch Kupchak
- Owner: Michael Jordan
- Arena: Spectrum Center

Results
- Record: 33–39 (.458)
- Place: Division: 4th (Southeast); Conference: 10th (Eastern)
- Playoff finish: Did not qualify
- Stats at Basketball Reference

Local media
- Television: Bally Sports South, Bally Sports Southeast
- Radio: WFNZ

The 2020–21 Charlotte Hornets season was the 31st season of the franchise in the National Basketball Association (NBA). The Hornets were coached by James Borrego, in his third season as the team's head coach.

Following the 2019–20 NBA season, the Hornets qualified as a lottery team, receiving the 3rd overall pick in the 2020 NBA draft lottery.

The Hornets selected LaMelo Ball with the 3rd pick in the 2020 NBA draft, followed by Vernon Carey Jr. and Grant Riller in the second round. In a draft-night trade, the Hornets also acquired Nick Richards from the New Orleans Pelicans in exchange for a 2024 second-round pick.

On November 30, in a sign-and-trade deal with the Boston Celtics, the Hornets acquired Gordon Hayward and two future second-round picks in exchange for a protected 2022 second-round pick. On March 25, the Hornets acquired Brad Wanamaker, a protected 2022 second-round pick, and cash considerations from the Golden State Warriors in exchange for a protected 2025 second-round pick.

The Hornets' season ended following a 144–117 loss to the Indiana Pacers in the NBA play-in tournament.

== NBA draft ==
Round	Pick	Player	Position	Nationality	School/club team
1	3	LaMelo Ball	PG	United States	(Australia) Illawarra Hawks
2	32	Vernon Carey Jr.	C	United States	Duke
2	56	Grant Riller	PG	United States	College of Charleston

== Roster ==
2020–21 Charlotte Hornets roster
Players

Pos.	No.	Player	Height	Weight	DOB	From
G	2	LaMelo Ball	6 ft 6 in (1.98 m)	180 lb (82 kg)	2001-08-22	SPIRE Academy (OH)
C	8	Bismack Biyombo	6 ft 9 in (2.06 m)	255 lb (116 kg)	1992-08-28	Republic of the Congo
F	0	Miles Bridges	6 ft 7 in (2.01 m)	225 lb (102 kg)	1998-03-21	Michigan State
C	22	Vernon Carey	6 ft 10 in (2.08 m)	270 lb (122 kg)	2001-02-25	Duke
G	30	Nate Darling (TW)	6 ft 6 in (1.98 m)	200 lb (91 kg)	1998-08-30	Delaware
G	4	Devonte' Graham	6 ft 1 in (1.85 m)	195 lb (88 kg)	1995-02-22	Kansas
F	20	Gordon Hayward (injured)	6 ft 7 in (2.01 m)	225 lb (102 kg)	1990-03-23	Butler
G/F	10	Caleb Martin	6 ft 6 in (1.98 m)	205 lb (93 kg)	1995-09-28	Nevada
G/F	11	Cody Martin	6 ft 6 in (1.98 m)	205 lb (93 kg)	1995-09-28	Nevada
F	6	Jalen McDaniels	6 ft 9 in (2.06 m)	205 lb (93 kg)	1998-01-31	San Diego State
G	1	Malik Monk	6 ft 3 in (1.91 m)	200 lb (91 kg)	1998-02-04	Kentucky
C	14	Nick Richards	7 ft 0 in (2.13 m)	245 lb (111 kg)	1997-11-29	Kentucky
G	7	Grant Riller (TW)	6 ft 2 in (1.88 m)	190 lb (86 kg)	1997-02-08	College of Charleston
G	3	Terry Rozier	6 ft 1 in (1.85 m)	190 lb (86 kg)	1994-03-17	Louisville
G	9	Brad Wanamaker	6 ft 3 in (1.91 m)	210 lb (95 kg)	1989-07-25	Pittsburgh
F	25	P. J. Washington	6 ft 7 in (2.01 m)	230 lb (104 kg)	1998-08-23	Kentucky
F/C	40	Cody Zeller	7 ft 0 in (2.13 m)	240 lb (109 kg)	1992-10-05	Indiana

Coaches
Head coach
- James Borrego
Assistant(s)
- Nick Friedman
- Dutch Gaitley
- Jay Hernandez
- Chad Iske
- Nate Mitchell
- Ronald Nored
- Jay Triano

Legend
- (DP) Unsigned draft pick
- (FA) Free agent
- (S) Suspended
- (GL) On assignment to G League affiliate
- (TW) Two-way affiliate player
- Injured

Roster
Updated: March 25, 2021

== Standings ==
=== Division ===
Southeast Division	W	L	PCT	GB	Home	Road	Div	GP
y – Atlanta Hawks	41	31	.569	–	25‍–‍11	16‍–‍20	9–3	72
x – Miami Heat	40	32	.556	1.0	21‍–‍15	19‍–‍17	6–6	72
x – Washington Wizards	34	38	.472	7.0	19‍–‍17	15‍–‍21	3–9	72
pi – Charlotte Hornets	33	39	.458	8.0	18‍–‍19	15‍–‍20	8–4	72
Orlando Magic	21	51	.292	20.0	11‍–‍25	10‍–‍26	4–8	72

=== Conference ===
Eastern Conference
#	Team	W	L	PCT	GB	GP
1	c − Philadelphia 76ers *	49	23	.681	–	72
2	x – Brooklyn Nets	48	24	.667	1.0	72
3	y – Milwaukee Bucks *	46	26	.639	3.0	72
4	x – New York Knicks	41	31	.569	8.0	72
5	y – Atlanta Hawks *	41	31	.569	8.0	72
6	x – Miami Heat	40	32	.556	9.0	72
7	x – Boston Celtics	36	36	.500	13.0	72
8	x – Washington Wizards	34	38	.472	15.0	72
9	pi – Indiana Pacers	34	38	.472	15.0	72
10	pi – Charlotte Hornets	33	39	.458	16.0	72
11	Chicago Bulls	31	41	.431	18.0	72
12	Toronto Raptors	27	45	.375	22.0	72
13	Cleveland Cavaliers	22	50	.306	27.0	72
14	Orlando Magic	21	51	.292	28.0	72
15	Detroit Pistons	20	52	.278	29.0	72

Notes

- z – Clinched home court advantage for the entire playoffs
- c – Clinched home court advantage for the conference playoffs
- y – Clinched division title
- x – Clinched playoff spot
- pb – Clinched play-in spot
- o – Eliminated from playoff contention
- * – Division leader

== Game log ==
=== Preseason ===
2020 preseason game log
Total: 1–3 (Home: 0-2; Road: 1–1)
Preseason: 1–3 (home: 0–2; road: 1–1)

Game	Date	Team	Score	High points	High rebounds	High assists	Location Attendance	Record
1	December 12	Toronto	L 100–111	Miles Bridges (12)	LaMelo Ball (10)	LaMelo Ball (4)	Spectrum Center	0–1
2	December 14	Toronto	L 109–112	McDaniels, Rozier (15)	Bridges, Washington (6)	Graham, Hayward (6)	Spectrum Center	0–2
3	December 17	@ Orlando	W 123–115	Terry Rozier (20)	Terry Rozier (7)	Devonte' Graham (6)	Amway Center	1–2
4	December 19	@ Orlando	L 117–120	Devonte' Graham (25)	Miles Bridges (15)	Terry Rozier (6)	Amway Center	1–3

2020–21 season schedule

=== Regular season ===
2020–21 game log
Total: 33–39; Home: 18–18; Road: 15–21
December: 2–2 (home: 1–1; road: 1–1)

Game	Date	Team	Score	High points	High rebounds	High assists	Location Attendance	Record
1	December 23	@ Cleveland	L 114–121	Terry Rozier (42)	Miles Bridges (6)	Devonte' Graham (10)	Rocket Mortgage FieldHouse; 300	0–1
2	December 26	Oklahoma City	L 107–109	Terry Rozier (19)	Bismack Biyombo (9)	Devonte' Graham (10)	Spectrum Center; 0	0–2
3	December 27	Brooklyn	W 106–104	Gordon Hayward (28)	P. J. Washington (12)	Gordon Hayward (7)	Spectrum Center; 0	1–2
4	December 30	@ Dallas	W 118–99	LaMelo Ball (22)	Miles Bridges (16)	Ball, Graham (5)	American Airlines Center; 0	2–2

January : 7–9 (home: 4–4; road: 3–5)

Game	Date	Team	Score	High points	High rebounds	High assists	Location Attendance	Record
5	January 1	Memphis	L 93–108	Bismack Biyombo (16)	LaMelo Ball (6)	Bismack Biyombo (12)	Spectrum Center; 0	2–3
6	January 2	@ Philadelphia	L 112–127	Terry Rozier (35)	Devonte' Graham (9)	Bismack Biyombo (9)	Wells Fargo Center; 0	2–4
7	January 4	@ Philadelphia	L 101–118	Gordon Hayward (18)	Hayward, Washington (8)	LaMelo Ball (9)	Wells Fargo Center; 0	2–5
8	January 6	@ Atlanta	W 102–94	Gordon Hayward (44)	P. J. Washington (10)	Devonte' Graham (7)	State Farm Arena; 0	3–5
9	January 8	@ New Orleans	W 118–110	Gordon Hayward (26)	LaMelo Ball (10)	LaMelo Ball (9)	Smoothie King Center; 759	4–5
10	January 9	Atlanta	W 113–105	Terry Rozier (23)	LaMelo Ball (12)	Lamelo Ball (11)	Spectrum Center; 0	5–5
11	January 11	New York	W 109–88	Gordon Hayward (34)	LaMelo Ball (14)	Ball, Graham (7)	Spectrum Center; 0	6–5
12	January 13	Dallas	L 93–104	Terry Rozier (18)	P. J. Washington (10)	Devonte' Graham (7)	Spectrum Center; 0	6–6
13	January 14	@ Toronto	L 108–111	Terry Rozier (22)	P. J. Washington (11)	LaMelo Ball (7)	Amalie Arena; 0	6–7
14	January 16	@ Toronto	L 113–116	Gordon Hayward (25)	P. J. Washington (12)	Devonte' Graham (7)	Amalie Arena; 0	6–8
–	January 20	Washington	Postponed (COVID-19) (Makeup date: February 7)					
15	January 22	Chicago	L 110–123	Gordon Hayward (34)	Bismack Biyombo (10)	Devonte' Graham (6)	Spectrum Center; 0	6–9
16	January 24	@ Orlando	W 107–104	Gordon Hayward (39)	Gordon Hayward (9)	LaMelo Ball (8)	Amway Center; 0	7–9
17	January 25	@ Orlando	L 108–117	Hayward, Rozier (24)	Biyombo, Zeller (7)	Ball, Hayward, Washington (4)	Amway Center; 3,167	7–10
18	January 27	Indiana	L 106–116	Terry Rozier (20)	Cody Zeller (14)	Ball, Graham (5)	Spectrum Center; 0	7–11
19	January 29	Indiana	W 108–105	Rozier, Washington (19)	P. J. Washington (9)	Devonte' Graham (10)	Spectrum Center; 0	8–11
20	January 30	Milwaukee	W 126–114	Ball, Hayward (27)	Cody Zeller (15)	LaMelo Ball (9)	Spectrum Center; 0	9–11

February: 7–6 (home: 4–3; road: 3–3)

Game	Date	Team	Score	High points	High rebounds	High assists	Location Attendance	Record
21	February 1	@ Miami	W 129–121	Malik Monk (36)	Cody Zeller (12)	LaMelo Ball (7)	American Airlines Arena; 0	10–11
22	February 3	Philadelphia	L 111–118	Ball, Hayward (22)	Bridges, Zeller (8)	Gordon Hayward (9)	Spectrum Center; 0	10–12
23	February 5	Utah	L 121–138	LaMelo Ball (34)	Gordon Hayward (10)	LaMelo Ball (8)	Spectrum Center; 0	10–13
24	February 7	Washington	W 119–97	Terry Rozier (26)	Miles Bridges (14)	LaMelo Ball (5)	Spectrum Center; 0	11–13
25	February 8	Houston	W 119–94	LaMelo Ball (24)	Miles Bridges (10)	LaMelo Ball (10)	Spectrum Center; 0	12–13
26	February 10	@ Memphis	L 114–130	Terry Rozier (34)	Miles Bridges (10)	LaMelo Ball (5)	FedEx Forum; 1,830	12–14
27	February 12	Minnesota	W 120–114	Terry Rozier (41)	LaMelo Ball (11)	Gordon Hayward (5)	Spectrum Center; 0	13–14
28	February 14	San Antonio	L 110–122	Terry Rozier (33)	Ball, Zeller (12)	LaMelo Ball (8)	Spectrum Center; 0	13–15
–	February 17	Chicago	Postponed (COVID-19) (Makeup date: May 6)					
–	February 19	Denver	Postponed (COVID-19) (Makeup date: May 11)					
29	February 20	Golden State	W 102–100	Terry Rozier (36)	Hayward, McDaniels (7)	LaMelo Ball (7)	Spectrum Center; 0	14–15
30	February 22	@ Utah	L 111–132	Ball, Hayward (21)	Ball, Zeller (7)	Ball, Washington (4)	Vivint Smart Home Arena; 3,902	14–16
31	February 24	@ Phoenix	W 124–121	Malik Monk (29)	Bismack Biyombo (11)	LaMelo Ball (8)	Phoenix Suns Arena; 3,296	15–16
32	February 26	@ Golden State	L 121–130	Malik Monk (25)	P. J. Washington (10)	LaMelo Ball (6)	Chase Center; 0	15–17
33	February 28	@ Sacramento	W 127–126	P. J. Washington (42)	Bridges, Washington (9)	LaMelo Ball (12)	Golden 1 Center; 0	16–17

March: 8–5 (home: 4–1; road: 4–4)

Game	Date	Team	Score	High points	High rebounds	High assists	Location Attendance	Record
34	March 1	@ Portland	L 111–123	LaMelo Ball (30)	Cody Martin (9)	LaMelo Ball (8)	Moda Center; 0	16–18
35	March 3	@ Minnesota	W 135–102	Terry Rozier (31)	Miles Bridges (10)	Gordon Hayward (9)	Target Center; 0	17–18
36	March 11	Detroit	W 105–102	P. J. Washington (20)	P. J. Washington (9)	LaMelo Ball (9)	Spectrum Center; 0	18–18
37	March 13	Toronto	W 114–104	LaMelo Ball (23)	LaMelo Ball (9)	LaMelo Ball (6)	Spectrum Center; 2,861	19–18
38	March 15	Sacramento	W 122–116	Terry Rozier (26)	Bismack Biyombo (10)	Cody Zeller (6)	Spectrum Center; 2,861	20–18
39	March 17	@ Denver	L 104–129	Terry Rozier (21)	P. J. Washington (6)	Gordon Hayward (6)	Ball Arena; 0	20–19
40	March 18	@ L. A. Lakers	L 105–116	LaMelo Ball (26)	Bridges, Hayward (9)	Gordon Hayward (10)	Staples Center; 0	20–20
41	March 20	@ L. A. Clippers	L 98–125	Miles Bridges (21)	Gordon Hayward (8)	Terry Rozier (5)	Staples Center; 0	20–21
42	March 22	@ San Antonio	W 100–97	Gordon Hayward (27)	P. J. Washington (13)	Hayward, Rozier (6)	AT&T Center; 3,222	21–21
43	March 24	@ Houston	W 122–97	Terry Rozier (25)	P. J. Washington (12)	Monk, Rozier, Washington (4)	Toyota Center; 3,163	22–21
44	March 26	Miami	W 110–105	Malik Monk (32)	Gordon Hayward (9)	Terry Rozier (11)	Spectrum Center; 4,215	23–21
45	March 28	Phoenix	L 97–101	Devonte' Graham (30)	Bridges, Washington (12)	Cody Martin (4)	Spectrum Center; 3,850	23–22
46	March 30	@ Washington	W 114–104	Terry Rozier (27)	Cody Zeller (13)	Graham, Hayward (6)	Capital One Arena; 0	24–22

April: 6–9 (home: 3–4; road: 3–5)

Game	Date	Team	Score	High points	High rebounds	High assists	Location Attendance	Record
47	April 1	@ Brooklyn	L 89–111	Graham, Hayward (13)	P. J. Washington (8)	Malik Monk (4)	Barclays Center; 1,773	24–23
48	April 2	@ Indiana	W 114–97	Miles Bridges (23)	Miles Bridges (10)	Graham, Hayward (6)	Bankers Life Fieldhouse; 0	25–23
49	April 4	@ Boston	L 86–116	Terry Rozier (22)	Rozier, Zeller (7)	Devonte' Graham (6)	TD Garden; 0	25–24
50	April 7	@ Oklahoma City	W 113–102	Jalen McDaniels (21)	Cody Zeller (14)	Brad Wanamaker (6)	Chesapeake Energy Arena; 0	26–24
51	April 9	@ Milwaukee	W 127–119	Miles Bridges (26)	Cody Zeller (12)	Brad Wanamaker (7)	Fiserv Forum; 3,280	27–24
52	April 11	Atlanta	L 101–105	Miles Bridges (23)	Cody Zeller (9)	Devonte' Graham (7)	Spectrum Center; 4,148	27–25
53	April 13	L. A. Lakers	L 93–101	Devonte' Graham (19)	Bismack Biyombo (12)	Devonte' Graham (6)	Spectrum Center; 3,676	27–26
54	April 14	Cleveland	L 90–103	Terry Rozier (22)	Bridges, Rozier, Cody Zeller (7)	Terry Rozier (8)	Spectrum Center; 2,955	27–27
55	April 16	@ Brooklyn	L 115–130	Terry Rozier (27)	Miles Bridges (9)	Terry Rozier (10)	Barclays Center; 1,773	27–28
56	April 18	Portland	W 109–101	Terry Rozier (34)	Rozier, Washington (8)	Terry Rozier (10)	Spectrum Center; 3,880	28–28
57	April 20	@ New York	L 97–109	P. J. Washington (26)	Miles Bridges (14)	Terry Rozier (8)	Madison Square Garden; 1,753	28–29
58	April 22	@ Chicago	L 91–108	Devonte' Graham (16)	Cody Zeller (6)	Terry Rozier (8)	United Center; 0	28–30
59	April 23	Cleveland	W 108–102	Bridges, Rozier, Washington (25)	Bismack Biyombo (11)	Devonte' Graham (10)	Spectrum Center; 4,060	29–30
60	April 25	Boston	W 125–104	Devonte' Graham (24)	P. J. Washington (12)	Terry Rozier (11)	Spectrum Center; 4,493	30–30
61	April 27	Milwaukee	L 104–114	Devonte' Graham (25)	Miles Bridges (10)	Bridges, Graham, Wanamaker (6)	Spectrum Center; 3,240	30–31
62	April 28	@ Boston	L 111–120	Devonte' Graham (25)	Cody Martin (9)	Graham, Rozier (7)	TD Garden; 2,298	30–32

May: 3–7 (home: 2–5; road: 1–2)

Game	Date	Team	Score	High points	High rebounds	High assists	Location Attendance	Record
63	May 1	Detroit	W 107–94	Terry Rozier (29)	Biyombo, McDaniels (9)	LaMelo Ball (8)	Spectrum Center; 3,776	31–32
64	May 2	Miami	L 111–121	P. J. Washington (21)	Jalen McDaniels (9)	Bridges, Ball, Graham, Monk (5)	Spectrum Center; 4,095	31–33
65	May 4	@ Detroit	W 102–99	LaMelo Ball (23)	Jalen McDaniels (12)	Ball, Rozier (6)	Little Caesars Arena; 750	32–33
66	May 6	Chicago	L 99–120	P. J. Washington (24)	Terry Rozier (8)	LaMelo Ball (9)	Spectrum Center; 3,769	32–34
67	May 7	Orlando	W 122–112	Terry Rozier (28)	Bismack Biyombo (11)	Ball, Rozier (6)	Spectrum Center; 3,751	33–34
68	May 9	New Orleans	L 110–112	Terry Rozier (43)	P. J. Washington (12)	LaMelo Ball (5)	Spectrum Center; 4,196	33–35
69	May 11	Denver	L 112–117	Devonte' Graham (31)	LaMelo Ball (12)	LaMelo Ball (7)	Spectrum Center; 3,997	33–36
70	May 13	L. A. Clippers	L 90–113	LaMelo Ball (18)	Bismack Biyombo (7)	LaMelo Ball (7)	Spectrum Center; 4,442	33–37
71	May 15	@ New York	L 109–118 (OT)	Miles Bridges (30)	Cody Zeller (11)	Devonte' Graham (8)	Madison Square Garden; 1,981	33–38
72	May 16	@ Washington	L 110–115	Terry Rozier (22)	Rozier, Washington (9)	Terry Rozier (9)	Capital One Arena; 5,333	33–39

2020–21 season schedule

=== Play-in ===
2021 play-in game log
Total: 0–1 (Home: 0–0; Road: 0–1)
Play-in: 0–1 (home: 0–0; road: 0–1)

Game	Date	Team	Score	High points	High rebounds	High assists	Location Attendance	Record
1	May 18	@ Indiana	L 117–144	Miles Bridges (23)	Bridges, Rozier (8)	Terry Rozier (6)	Bankers Life Fieldhouse; 0	0–1

== Player statistics ==
=== Ragular season ===
Player	POS	GP	GS	MP	REB	AST	STL	BLK	PTS	MPG	RPG	APG	SPG	BPG	PPG
Terry Rozier	SG	69	69	2,383	302	293	87	26	1,407	34.5	4.4	4.2	1.3	.4	20.4
Bismack Biyombo	C	66	36	1,349	347	81	17	74	331	20.4	5.3	1.2	.3	1.1	5.0
Miles Bridges	PF	66	19	1,932	397	147	44	52	840	29.3	6.0	2.2	.7	.8	12.7
P. J. Washington	PF	64	61	1,954	418	161	69	79	824	30.5	6.5	2.5	1.1	1.2	12.9
Devonte' Graham	PG	55	44	1,659	148	295	48	6	816	30.2	2.7	5.4	.9	.1	14.8
Caleb Martin	SF	53	3	818	141	67	37	12	264	15.4	2.7	1.3	.7	.2	5.0
Cody Martin	SF	52	10	849	161	86	37	12	207	16.3	3.1	1.7	.7	.2	4.0
LaMelo Ball	PG	51	31	1,469	302	313	81	18	803	28.8	5.9	6.1	1.6	.4	15.7
Cody Zeller	C	48	21	1,005	328	86	27	17	451	20.9	6.8	1.8	.6	.4	9.4
Jalen McDaniels	SF	47	18	904	169	53	28	19	346	19.2	3.6	1.1	.6	.4	7.4
Gordon Hayward	SF	44	44	1,496	258	181	52	14	863	34.0	5.9	4.1	1.2	.3	19.6
Malik Monk	SG	42	0	878	101	87	19	4	490	20.9	2.4	2.1	.5	.1	11.7
Brad Wanamaker^{†}	PG	22	0	428	39	75	17	5	151	19.5	1.8	3.4	.8	.2	6.9
Vernon Carey Jr.	C	19	4	115	27	2	1	5	46	6.1	1.4	.1	.1	.3	2.4
Nick Richards	C	18	0	63	11	2	0	0	15	3.5	.6	.1	.0	.0	.8
Grant Riller	PG	7	0	27	1	3	1	0	18	3.9	.1	.4	.1	.0	2.6
Nate Darling	SG	7	0	26	1	1	0	1	9	3.7	.1	.1	.0	.1	1.3

- ^{†} Denotes player spent time with another team in the season. Stats reflect time with the Hornets only.

== Transactions ==
=== Trades ===
November 19, 2020	To Charlotte Hornets Nick Richards	To New Orleans Pelicans 2024 second-round pick
November 29, 2020	To Charlotte Hornets Gordon Hayward; 2023 second-round pick 2024 second-round pick	To Boston Celtics 2022 second-round pick
March 25, 2021	To Charlotte Hornets Brad Wanamaker; 2022 second-round pick Cash considerations	To Golden State Warriors 2025 second-round pick

=== Free agents ===
==== Re-signed ====
Player	Signed
Bismack Biyombo	November 30, 2020

==== Additions ====
Player	Signed	Former team
LaMelo Ball	November 30, 2020	(Australia) Illawarra Hawks
Vernon Carey Jr.	November 30, 2020	Duke Blue Devils
Nate Darling (TW)	November 30, 2020	Delaware Fightin' Blue Hens
Nick Richards	November 30, 2020	Kentucky Wildcats
Grant Riller (TW)	November 30, 2020	College of Charleston Cougars

==== Subtractions ====
Player	Reason left	New team
Dwayne Bacon	UFA	Orlando Magic
Nicolas Batum	Waived	Los Angeles Clippers
Willy Hernangomez	UFA	New Orleans Pelicans
Ray Spalding	Waived	Houston Rockets
