= 2020–21 Cleveland Cavaliers season =

NBA professional basketball team season

- Head coach: J. B. Bickerstaff
- General manager: Koby Altman
- Owner: Dan Gilbert
- Arena: Rocket Mortgage FieldHouse

Results
- Record: 22–50 (.306)
- Place: Division: 4th (Central); Conference: 13th (Eastern)
- Playoff finish: Did not qualify
- Stats at Basketball Reference

Local media
- Television: Bally Sports Ohio (Note: Formerly Fox Sports Ohio until March 31, 2021.)
- Radio: WTAM; WMMS

The 2020–21 Cleveland Cavaliers season was the 51st season of the franchise in the National Basketball Association (NBA). They did not make it to the playoffs for the third season in a row.

== Draft ==
Round	Pick	Player	Position	Nationality	College / Club
1	5	Isaac Okoro	Forward	USA	Auburn Tigers

Before the start of the 2020 NBA draft period, the Cavaliers' selection was originally held as the #3 selection due to them finishing their previous season with the third worst record in the NBA (only ahead of the Minnesota Timberwolves and Golden State Warriors) before the NBA suspended their season on March 12 and eventually cancelled Cleveland's season on June 5. Like Minnesota and Golden State, Cleveland held the best odds to jump up to the #1 pick in the 2020 NBA draft lottery, though the Cavaliers could have fallen as low as the #6 pick. However, unlike Minnesota and Golden State, Cleveland did not stay in the top 3; their first-round pick instead dropped down to the fifth selection of the draft. The Cavaliers didn't have a second round selection.

== Trades ==
On January 13, 2021, the Cavaliers were part of a blockbuster four team trade. As part of the deal which was headlined by James Harden going to the Brooklyn Nets, the Cavs received center Jarrett Allen and forward Taurean Prince from Brooklyn, while sending guard Dante Exum and a 2022 first-round draft pick to the Houston Rockets.

On January 22, 2021, the Cavaliers traded disgruntled small forward Kevin Porter Jr. to the Rockets for a highly protected future second-round pick.

== Roster ==
2020–21 Cleveland Cavaliers roster
Players

Pos.	No.	Player	Height	Weight	DOB	From
C	31	Jarrett Allen	6 ft 11 in (2.11 m)	243 lb (110 kg)	1998-04-21	Texas
G	18	Matthew Dellavedova (injured)	6 ft 3 in (1.91 m)	200 lb (91 kg)	1990-09-08	Saint Mary's
G	21	Damyean Dotson	6 ft 5 in (1.96 m)	210 lb (95 kg)	1994-05-06	Houston
G	10	Darius Garland	6 ft 1 in (1.85 m)	192 lb (87 kg)	2000-01-26	Vanderbilt
C	55	Isaiah Hartenstein	7 ft 0 in (2.13 m)	250 lb (113 kg)	1998-05-05	Germany
C	27	Mfiondu Kabengele	6 ft 10 in (2.08 m)	250 lb (113 kg)	1997-08-14	Florida State
F	0	Kevin Love	6 ft 10 in (2.08 m)	251 lb (114 kg)	1988-09-07	UCLA
G	3	Jeremiah Martin (TW)	6 ft 2 in (1.88 m)	185 lb (84 kg)	1996-06-19	Memphis
F	22	Larry Nance (injured)	6 ft 7 in (2.01 m)	245 lb (111 kg)	1993-01-01	Wyoming
G/F	35	Isaac Okoro	6 ft 5 in (1.96 m)	225 lb (102 kg)	2001-01-26	Auburn
F	16	Cedi Osman	6 ft 7 in (2.01 m)	230 lb (104 kg)	1995-04-08	Turkey
F	12	Taurean Prince (injured)	6 ft 7 in (2.01 m)	218 lb (99 kg)	1994-03-22	Baylor
G	2	Collin Sexton	6 ft 1 in (1.85 m)	190 lb (86 kg)	1999-01-04	Alabama
F	8	Lamar Stevens	6 ft 6 in (1.98 m)	230 lb (104 kg)	1997-07-09	Penn State
G	33	Brodric Thomas (TW)	6 ft 5 in (1.96 m)	185 lb (84 kg)	1997-01-28	Truman State
F	32	Dean Wade	6 ft 9 in (2.06 m)	228 lb (103 kg)	1996-11-20	Kansas State
G	9	Dylan Windler (injured)	6 ft 6 in (1.98 m)	196 lb (89 kg)	1996-09-22	Belmont

Coaches
Head coach
- J. B. Bickerstaff
Assistant(s)
- Greg Buckner
- Dan Geriot
- Lindsay Gottlieb
- Antonio Lang
- J. J. Outlaw

Legend
- (DP) Unsigned draft pick
- (FA) Free agent
- (S) Suspended
- (GL) On assignment to G League affiliate
- (TW) Two-way affiliate player
- Injured

Roster
Updated: May 19, 2021

== Standings ==
=== Division ===
Central Division	W	L	PCT	GB	Home	Road	Div	GP
y – Milwaukee Bucks	46	26	.639	–	26‍–‍10	20‍–‍16	11–1	72
pi – Indiana Pacers	34	38	.472	12.0	13‍–‍23	21‍–‍15	7–5	72
Chicago Bulls	31	41	.431	15.0	15‍–‍21	16‍–‍20	7–5	72
Cleveland Cavaliers	22	50	.306	24.0	13‍–‍23	9‍–‍27	4–8	72
Detroit Pistons	20	52	.278	26.0	13‍–‍23	7‍–‍29	1–11	72

=== Conference ===
Eastern Conference
#	Team	W	L	PCT	GB	GP
1	c − Philadelphia 76ers *	49	23	.681	–	72
2	x – Brooklyn Nets	48	24	.667	1.0	72
3	y – Milwaukee Bucks *	46	26	.639	3.0	72
4	x – New York Knicks	41	31	.569	8.0	72
5	y – Atlanta Hawks *	41	31	.569	8.0	72
6	x – Miami Heat	40	32	.556	9.0	72
7	x – Boston Celtics	36	36	.500	13.0	72
8	x – Washington Wizards	34	38	.472	15.0	72
9	pi – Indiana Pacers	34	38	.472	15.0	72
10	pi – Charlotte Hornets	33	39	.458	16.0	72
11	Chicago Bulls	31	41	.431	18.0	72
12	Toronto Raptors	27	45	.375	22.0	72
13	Cleveland Cavaliers	22	50	.306	27.0	72
14	Orlando Magic	21	51	.292	28.0	72
15	Detroit Pistons	20	52	.278	29.0	72

Notes

- z – Clinched home court advantage for the entire playoffs
- c – Clinched home court advantage for the conference playoffs
- y – Clinched division title
- x – Clinched playoff spot
- pb – Clinched play-in spot
- o – Eliminated from playoff contention
- * – Division leader

== Game log ==
=== Preseason ===
2020 preseason game log
Total: 2–2 (Home: 2–0; Road: 0–2)
Preseason: 2–2 (home: 2–0; road: 0–2)

Game	Date	Team	Score	High points	High rebounds	High assists	Location Attendance	Record
1	December 12	Indiana	W 107–104	Cedi Osman (23)	Maker, Nance Jr. (10)	Dante Exum (5)	Rocket Mortgage FieldHouse; 0	1–0
2	December 14	Indiana	W 116–106	Dante Exum (23)	Andre Drummond (11)	Dante Exum (5)	Rocket Mortgage FieldHouse; 0	2–0
3	December 16	@ New York	L 93–100	Andre Drummond (18)	Andre Drummond (14)	Drummond, Garland (5)	Madison Square Garden; 0	2–1
4	December 18	@ New York	L 83–119	Cedi Osman (19)	Charles Matthews (7)	Mooney, Sexton (4)	Madison Square Garden; 0	2–2

2020–21 season schedule

=== Regular season ===
2020–21 game log
Total: 22–50 (Home: 13–23; Road: 9–27)
December: 3–2 (home: 2–1; road: 1–1)

Game	Date	Team	Score	High points	High rebounds	High assists	Location Attendance	Record
1	December 23	Charlotte	W 121–114	Collin Sexton (27)	Andre Drummond (14)	Larry Nance Jr. (8)	Rocket Mortgage FieldHouse; 300	1–0
2	December 26	@ Detroit	W 128–119 (OT)	Collin Sexton (32)	Andre Drummond (16)	Darius Garland (12)	Little Caesars Arena; 0	2–0
3	December 27	Philadelphia	W 118–94	Andre Drummond (24)	Andre Drummond (14)	Darius Garland (7)	Rocket Mortgage FieldHouse; 0	3–0
4	December 29	New York	L 86–95	Collin Sexton (20)	Andre Drummond (17)	Darius Garland (6)	Rocket Mortgage FieldHouse; 0	3–1
5	December 31	@ Indiana	L 99–119	Collin Sexton (28)	Drummond, McGee (13)	Larry Nance Jr. (7)	Bankers Life Fieldhouse; 0	3–2

January: 6–9 (home: 4–3; road: 2–6)

Game	Date	Team	Score	High points	High rebounds	High assists	Location Attendance	Record
6	January 2	@ Atlanta	W 96–91	Collin Sexton (27)	Drummond, Nance Jr. (11)	Larry Nance Jr. (6)	State Farm Arena; 0	4–2
7	January 4	@ Orlando	L 83–103	Collin Sexton (24)	Andre Drummond (13)	Cedi Osman (7)	Amway Center; 0	4–3
8	January 6	@ Orlando	L 94–105	Collin Sexton (21)	Andre Drummond (15)	Cedi Osman (7)	Amway Center; 0	4–4
9	January 7	@ Memphis	W 94–90	Andre Drummond (22)	Andre Drummond (15)	Cedi Osman (7)	FedExForum; 0	5–4
10	January 9	@ Milwaukee	L 90–100	Andre Drummond (26)	Andre Drummond (24)	Damyean Dotson (8)	Fiserv Forum; 0	5–5
11	January 11	Memphis	L 91–101	Andre Drummond (19)	Andre Drummond (14)	Damyean Dotson (6)	Rocket Mortgage FieldHouse; 0	5–6
12	January 12	Utah	L 87–117	Cedi Osman (17)	JaVale McGee (9)	Cedi Osman (6)	Rocket Mortgage FieldHouse; 0	5–7
13	January 15	New York	W 106–103	Andre Drummond (33)	Andre Drummond (23)	Nance Jr., Osman (5)	Rocket Mortgage FieldHouse; 0	6–7
	January 17	@ Washington	Postponed (COVID-19) (Makeup date: April 25)					
	January 18	@ Washington	Postponed (COVID-19) (Makeup date: May 14)					
14	January 20	Brooklyn	W 147–135 (2OT)	Collin Sexton (42)	Jarrett Allen (11)	Cedi Osman (7)	Rocket Mortgage FieldHouse; 0	7–7
15	January 22	Brooklyn	W 125–113	Collin Sexton (25)	Andre Drummond (16)	Collin Sexton (9)	Rocket Mortgage FieldHouse; 0	8–7
16	January 24	@ Boston	L 103–141	Collin Sexton (13)	Jarrett Allen (7)	Garland, Prince (5)	TD Garden; 0	8–8
17	January 25	L.A. Lakers	L 108–115	Andre Drummond (25)	Andre Drummond (17)	Collin Sexton (6)	Rocket Mortgage FieldHouse; 0	8–9
18	January 27	Detroit	W 122–107	Collin Sexton (29)	Andre Drummond (16)	Isaac Okoro (6)	Rocket Mortgage FieldHouse; 1,944	9–9
19	January 29	@ New York	L 81–102	Darius Garland (24)	Andre Drummond (15)	Collin Sexton (5)	Madison Square Garden; 0	9–10
20	January 31	@ Minnesota	L 104–109	Andre Drummond (25)	Andre Drummond (22)	Darius Garland (5)	Target Center; 0	9–11

February: 4–10 (home: 3–5; road: 1–5)

Game	Date	Team	Score	High points	High rebounds	High assists	Location Attendance	Record
21	February 1	Minnesota	W 100–98	Collin Sexton (26)	Jarrett Allen (18)	Darius Garland (11)	Rocket Mortgage FieldHouse	10–11
22	February 3	L.A. Clippers	L 99–121	Collin Sexton (27)	Jarrett Allen (9)	Allen, Sexton (5)	Rocket Mortgage FieldHouse	10–12
23	February 5	Milwaukee	L 105–123	Collin Sexton (19)	Andre Drummond (9)	Drummond, Garland, Prince, Sexton (4)	Rocket Mortgage FieldHouse	10–13
24	February 6	Milwaukee	L 99–124	Andre Drummond (28)	Andre Drummond (11)	Darius Garland (9)	Rocket Mortgage FieldHouse	10–14
25	February 8	@ Phoenix	L 113–119	Collin Sexton (23)	Andre Drummond (14)	Darius Garland (7)	Phoenix Suns Arena	10–15
26	February 10	@ Denver	L 95–133	Jarrett Allen (18)	Jarrett Allen (10)	Collin Sexton (8)	Ball Arena	10–16
27	February 12	@ Portland	L 110–129	Collin Sexton (25)	Dylan Windler (10)	Collin Sexton (5)	Moda Center	10–17
28	February 14	@ L.A. Clippers	L 111–128	Collin Sexton (22)	Allen, McGee (10)	Darius Garland (6)	Staples Center	10–18
29	February 15	@ Golden State	L 98–129	Collin Sexton (23)	Jarrett Allen (14)	Collin Sexton (5)	Chase Center	10–19
	February 17	San Antonio	Postponed (COVID-19) (Makeup date: March 19)					
30	February 19	Denver	L 103–120	Collin Sexton (23)	Jarrett Allen (10)	Cedi Osman (7)	Rocket Mortgage FieldHouse	10–20
31	February 21	Oklahoma City	L 101–117	Collin Sexton (27)	Jarrett Allen (17)	Darius Garland (8)	Rocket Mortgage FieldHouse	10–21
32	February 23	Atlanta	W 112–111	Collin Sexton (29)	Jarrett Allen (14)	Darius Garland (8)	Rocket Mortgage FieldHouse	11–21
33	February 24	Houston	W 112–96	Jarrett Allen (26)	Jarrett Allen (18)	Darius Garland (10)	Rocket Mortgage FieldHouse	12–21
34	February 27	@ Philadelphia	W 112–109 (OT)	Collin Sexton (28)	Dean Wade (12)	Darius Garland (9)	Wells Fargo Center	13–21

March: 4–9 (home: 2–3; road: 2–6)

Game	Date	Team	Score	High points	High rebounds	High assists	Location Attendance	Record
35	March 1	@ Houston	W 101–90	Collin Sexton (39)	Jarrett Allen (15)	Collin Sexton (8)	Toyota Center	14–21

April: 4–12 (home: 1–6; road: 3–6)

Game	Date	Team	Score	High points	High rebounds	High assists	Location Attendance	Record

May: 1–8 (home: 1–5; road: 0–3)

Game	Date	Team	Score	High points	High rebounds	High assists	Location Attendance	Record

2020–21 season schedule

== Player statistics ==
Legend
GP	Games played	GS	Games started	MPG	Minutes per game
FG%	Field-goal percentage	3P%	3-point field-goal percentage	FT%	Free-throw percentage
RPG	Rebounds per game	APG	Assists per game	SPG	Steals per game
BPG	Blocks per game	PPG	Points per game

=== Regular season ===
Player	GP	GS	MPG	FG%	3P%	FT%	RPG	APG	SPG	BPG	PPG
Isaac Okoro	67	67	32.4	.420	.290	.726	3.1	1.9	.9	.4	9.6
Dean Wade	63	19	19.2	.431	.366	.769	3.4	1.2	.6	.3	6.0
Collin Sexton	60	60	35.3	.475	.371	.815	3.1	4.4	1.0	.2	24.3
Cedi Osman	59	26	25.6	.374	.306	.800	3.4	2.9	.9	.2	10.4
Darius Garland	54	50	33.1	.451	.395	.848	2.4	6.1	1.2	.1	17.4
Jarrett Allen^{†}	51	40	30.3	.609	.316	.690	9.9	1.7	.5	1.4	13.2
Damyean Dotson	46	7	19.7	.406	.289	.667	2.0	2.0	.3	.1	6.7
Lamar Stevens	40	0	12.5	.456	.160	.725	2.4	.6	.4	.3	4.1
Larry Nance Jr.	35	27	31.2	.471	.360	.612	6.7	3.1	1.7	.5	9.3
JaVale McGee^{†}	33	1	15.2	.521	.250	.655	5.2	1.0	.5	1.2	8.0
Dylan Windler	31	0	16.5	.438	.338	.778	3.5	1.1	.6	.4	5.2
Taurean Prince^{†}	29	6	23.7	.399	.415	.837	3.7	2.4	.7	.5	10.1
Brodric Thomas^{†}	28	1	13.4	.366	.283	.667	1.8	.9	.5	.3	4.1
Andre Drummond^{†}	25	25	28.9	.474	.000	.597	13.5	2.6	1.6	1.2	17.5
Kevin Love	25	25	24.9	.409	.365	.824	7.4	2.5	.6	.1	12.2
Isaiah Hartenstein^{†}	16	2	17.9	.582	.333	.686	6.0	2.5	.5	1.2	8.3
Mfiondu Kabengele^{†}	16	0	11.6	.421	.281	.786	2.9	.8	.4	.6	4.3
Matthew Dellavedova	13	1	17.2	.250	.160	1.000	1.8	4.5	.3	.1	2.8
Jeremiah Martin	9	0	8.3	.273	.250	.200	.8	.4	.6	.2	2.4
Thon Maker	8	0	9.5	.556	.000	.909	2.3	.5	.3	.5	3.8
Quinn Cook^{†}	7	0	13.6	.405	.462	1.000	1.7	1.9	.4	.0	6.1
Danté Exum	6	3	19.3	.385	.182	.500	2.8	2.2	.7	.3	3.8
Marques Bolden	6	0	4.8	.333		.625	1.0	.0	.3	.3	1.2
Anderson Varejão	5	0	7.2	.250	.000	.556	4.0	.6	.0	.4	2.6
Yogi Ferrell^{†}	2	0	20.0	.381	.333	.000	3.5	2.5	1.5	.5	9.5

- ^{†} Denotes player spent time with another team in the season. Stats reflect time with the Cavaliers only.

== Transactions ==
=== Trades ===
November 23, 2020	To Cleveland Cavaliers 2025 second-round pick	To Milwaukee Bucks Draft rights to İlkan Karaman
November 18, 2020	To Cleveland Cavaliers JaVale McGee; 2026 second-round pick	To Los Angeles Lakers Jordan Bell; Alfonzo McKinnie
November 23, 2020	To Cleveland Cavaliers Rayjon Tucker; 2027 second-round pick	To Utah Jazz Cash considerations
January 13, 2021	To Cleveland Cavaliers Jarrett Allen; Taurean Prince; Draft rights to Sasha Vezenkov	To Brooklyn Nets James Harden; 2024 second-round pick
January 13, 2021	To Houston Rockets Victor Oladipo; Dante Exum; Rodions Kurucs; 2022 first-round pick 2022 first-round pick 2024 first-round pick 2026 first-round pick 2021 first-round pick swap 2023 first-round pick swap 2025 first-round pick swap 2027 first-round pick swap	To Indiana Pacers Caris LeVert; 2023 second-round pick 2024 second-round pick Cash considerations
November 23, 2020	To Cleveland Cavaliers 2024 second-round pick	To Houston Rockets Kevin Porter Jr.
November 23, 2020	To Cleveland Cavaliers Isaiah Hartenstein; 2023 second-round pick 2027 second-round pick	To Denver Nuggets JaVale McGee

=== Free agency ===
==== Re-signed ====
Player	Signed
Isaac Okoro	November 21, 2020
Matthew Dellavedova	November 24, 2020
Marques Bolden	December 19, 2020
Quinn Cook	March 22, 2021

==== Additions ====
Player	Signed	Former team
Lamar Stevens	November 19, 2020	Undrafted
Damyean Dotson	November 24, 2020	New York Knicks
Charles Matthews	November 27, 2020	Unsigned
Marques Bolden	November 28, 2020	Canton Charge
Thon Maker	November 28, 2020	Detroit Pistons
Levi Randolph	December 1, 2020	Canton Charge
Norvel Pelle	December 19, 2020	Philadelphia 76ers
Yogi Ferrell	January 11, 2021	Sacramento Kings
Brodric Thomas	February 24, 2021	Rio Grande Valley Vipers
Quinn Cook	March 12, 2021	Los Angeles Lakers
Anderson Varejao	May 4, 2021	Flamengo Basketball

==== Subtractions ====
Player	Reason left	New team
Rayjon Tucker	Waived	Los Angeles Clippers
Norvel Pelle	Waived	Canton Charge
Matt Mooney	Waived	Raptors 905
Charles Matthews	Waived	Canton Charge
Levi Randolph	Waived	Canton Charge
Thon Maker	Waived	
Andre Drummond	Waived	Los Angeles Lakers
