= Terry Rozier =

American basketball player (born 1994)

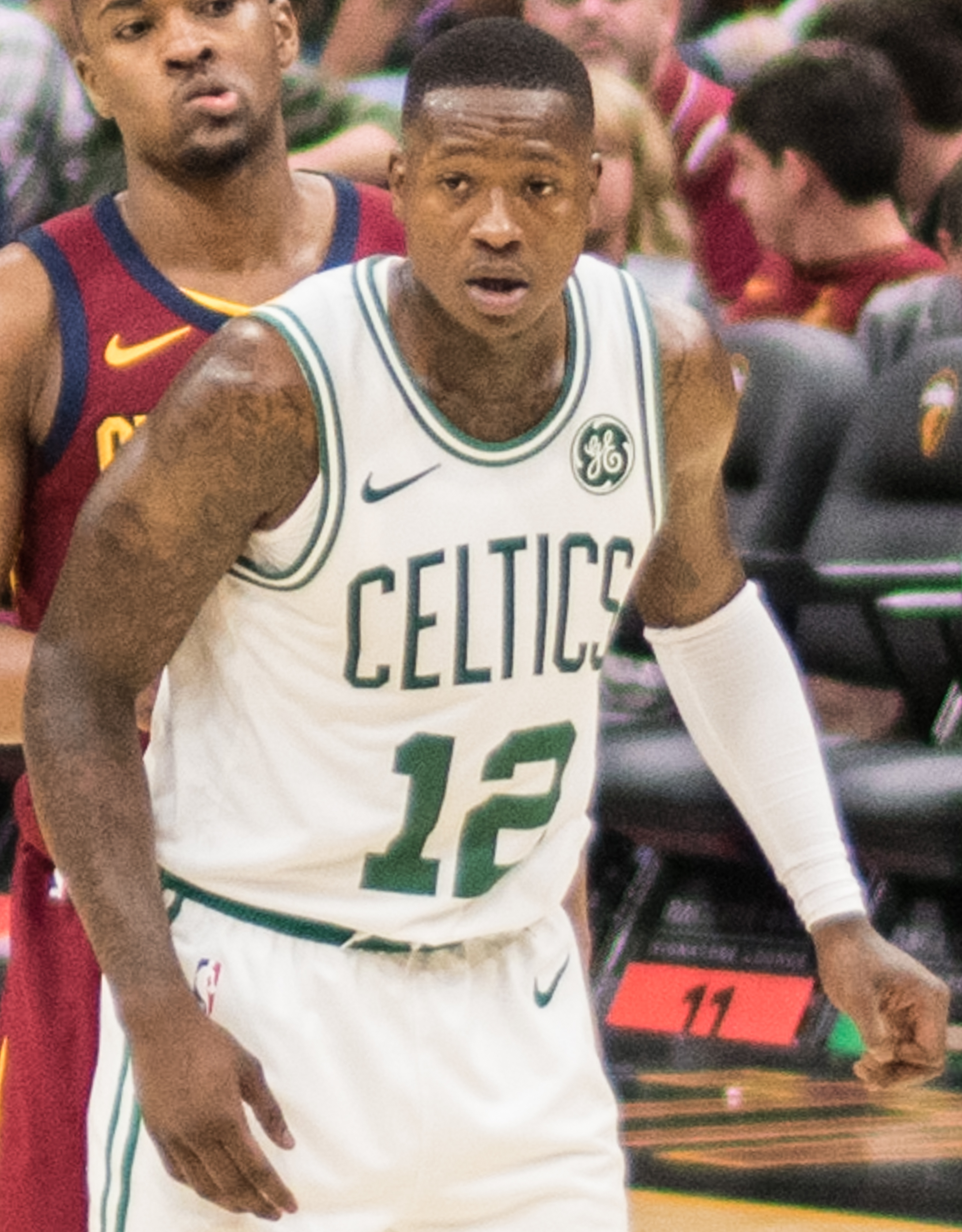
- Rozier with the Boston Celtics in 2018

Free agent
- Position: Shooting guard / point guard

Personal information
- Born: March 17, 1994 (age 32) Youngstown, Ohio, U.S.
- Listed height: 6 ft 1 in (1.85 m)
- Listed weight: 190 lb (86 kg)

Career information
- High school: Shaker Heights (Shaker Heights, Ohio); Hargrave (Chatham, Virginia)
- College: Louisville (2013–2015)
- NBA draft: 2015: 1st round, 16th overall pick
- Drafted by: Boston Celtics
- Playing career: 2015–present

Career history
- 2015–2019: Boston Celtics
- 2015–2016: →Maine Red Claws
- 2019–2024: Charlotte Hornets
- 2024–2026: Miami Heat

Career highlights
- Second-team All-ACC (2015); AAC All-Rookie Team (2014)
- Stats at NBA.com
- Stats at Basketball Reference

Terry William Rozier III (/roʊˈzɪər/ roh-ZEER; born March 17, 1994), nicknamed "Scary Terry", is an American professional basketball player, who most recently played for the Miami Heat of the National Basketball Association (NBA). He previously played for the Boston Celtics and Charlotte Hornets.

Rozier played college basketball for the Louisville Cardinals before being selected with the 16th overall pick in the 2015 NBA draft by the Celtics. Rozier spent his first four seasons as a reserve with the Celtics until being traded to the Hornets in a sign-and-trade deal. Rozier was a starter for the Hornets for four-and-a-half seasons before being traded to the Heat.

In October 2025, Rozier was arrested by the Federal Bureau of Investigation (FBI) for his alleged involvement in an illegal gambling scheme.

== Early life ==
Rozier was born in Youngstown, Ohio, on March 17, 1994. His father, Terry Rozier Sr., was sent to prison for eight years when Rozier Jr. was two months old. In 2005, shortly after Rozier Sr. was released from prison, Rozier Jr. spent a few months with his father before his father was arrested again on charges of involuntary manslaughter for his involvement in a robbery and kidnapping from 2003 that had led to the accidental death of an accomplice. Rozier Sr. was then sentenced to 13 years in prison. As a result, Rozier was raised primarily by his mother, Gina Tucker, and his grandmother, Amanda Tucker, alongside his brother and half-sister.

== High school career ==
Rozier starred at Shaker Heights High School in Shaker Heights, Ohio, graduating in 2012. In his senior year, Rozier averaged 25.6 points, 6.5 rebounds, 4.5 assists and 4.7 steals per game while leading Shaker to a 21–3 record and taking them to the regional semifinals as a senior for the first time since 2002. He was named an All-Lake Erie League selection for three years and was 74th in recruiting ranking on ESPNU's Top 100 Players list in 2012.

As Rozier had to improve his grades, Rozier initially played at Hargrave Military Academy before joining Louisville. In his 2012–13 campaign at Hargrave, Rozier averaged 29.3 points, 7.8 rebounds and 5.6 assists while the team went 38–8; he also earned the 2012 Kentucky Derby Festival Basketball Classic MVP and placed second in the dunk and three-point contest that season.

== College career ==
As a freshman at Louisville in 2013–14, Rozier averaged 7.0 points and 3.1 rebounds per game in 37 games and made the AAC All-Rookie Team.

As a sophomore in 2014–15, Rozier led the Cardinals in scoring with 17.1 points per game and was named second-team All-ACC. On March 30, 2015, Rozier and Louisville teammate Montrezl Harrell declared for the 2015 NBA draft.

== Professional career ==
=== Boston Celtics (2015–2019) ===
On June 25, 2015, Rozier was selected by the Boston Celtics with the 16th overall pick in the 2015 NBA draft. On July 27, 2015, he signed his rookie-scale contract with the Celtics. During his rookie season, Rozier received multiple assignments to the Maine Red Claws, Boston's D-League affiliate. He appeared in 39 regular season games for the Celtics in 2015–16, scoring a season-high seven points twice. In his first playoff game, Rozier scored 10 points on 4-of-7 shooting against the Atlanta Hawks.

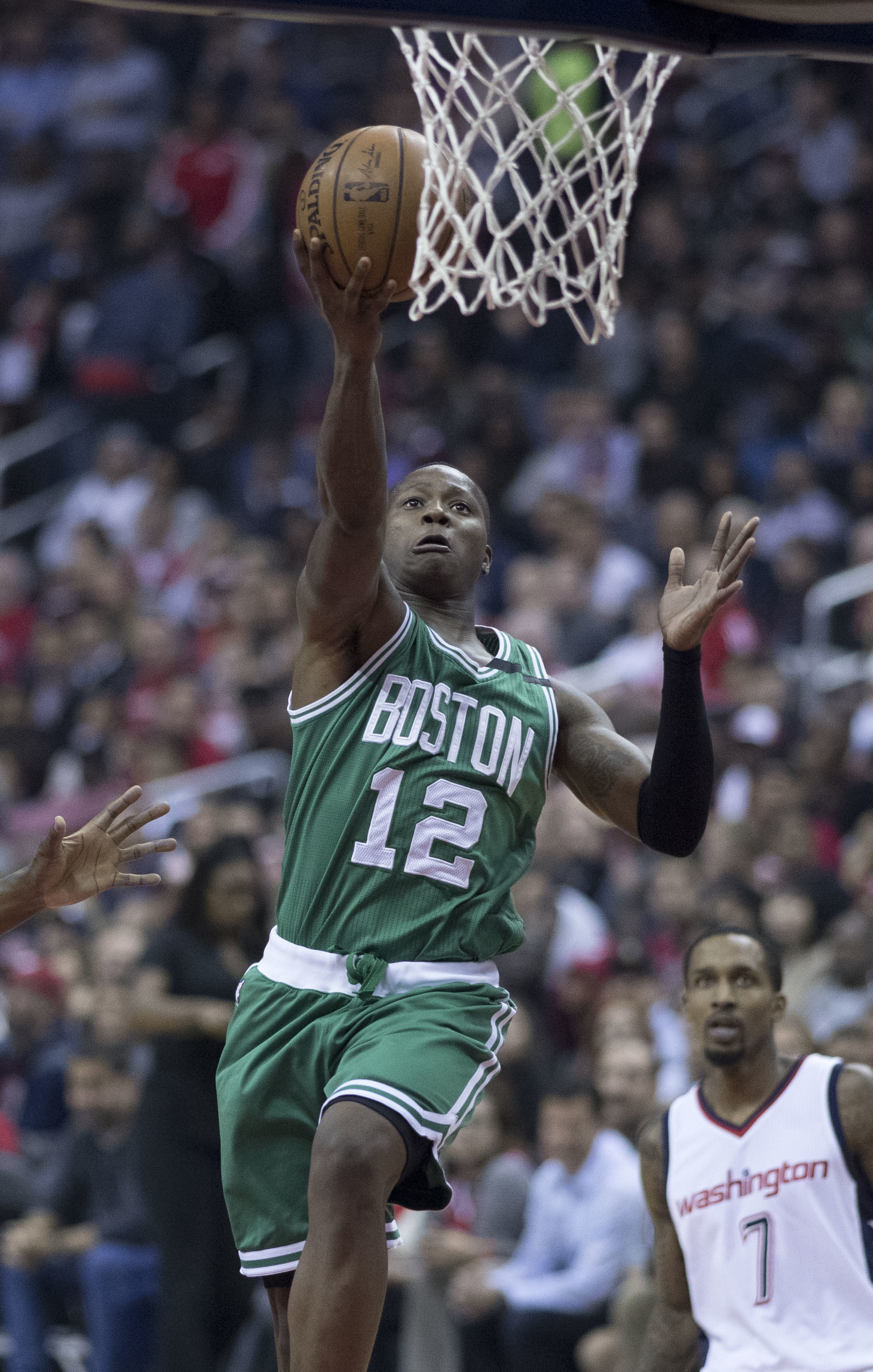
Rozier in 2017

On November 12, 2016, Rozier scored a career-high 11 points in a 105–99 victory over the Indiana Pacers. He topped that mark nine days later, scoring 12 points in a 99–93 victory over the Minnesota Timberwolves. On December 7, Rozier scored a career-high 16 points in a 117–87 victory over the Orlando Magic. On March 19, 2017, he recorded his first career double-double with 14 points and 10 rebounds in a 105–99 loss to the Philadelphia 76ers.

On November 24, 2017, Rozier scored a career-high 23 points in a 118–103 victory over the Orlando Magic. On December 18, he made a steal and go-ahead dunk with 1.5 seconds remaining that gave the Celtics a narrow 112–111 victory over the Indiana Pacers. On January 31, Rozier logged his first career triple-double in his first NBA start to help the Celtics to a 103–73 victory over the New York Knicks, recording 17 points, 11 rebounds, and 10 assists while becoming just the second player in NBA history with a triple-double in his first start, joining Tony Wroten, who set the initial record on November 13, 2013, with the Philadelphia 76ers. Two days later, in his second career start, Rozier scored a career-high 31 points in a 119–110 win over the Hawks. On March 25, in his sixth start in place of the injured Kyrie Irving, Rozier scored a career-high 33 points in a 104–93 victory over the Sacramento Kings. He also had five rebounds and three assists. In Game 2 of the Celtics' first-round playoff series against the Milwaukee Bucks, Rozier scored 23 points in helping Boston take a 2–0 series lead with a 120–106 victory. In Game 7, Rozier scored 26 points in a 112–96 victory over the Bucks. In Game 1 of their second-round series against the 76ers, Rozier recorded 29 points, eight rebounds and six assists in a 117–101 victory. In Game 6 of the Eastern Conference Finals, Rozier scored 28 points in a 109–99 loss to the Cleveland Cavaliers. The Celtics went on to lose in seven games.

On November 9, 2018, Rozier scored a then-season-high 22 points in a 123–115 loss to the Utah Jazz, making his first start of the season in place of Irving. On January 30, Rozier had 17 points and tied a career high with 10 assists in a 126–94 victory over the Charlotte Hornets.

=== Charlotte Hornets (2019–2024) ===
On July 6, 2019, Rozier was traded to the Charlotte Hornets as part of a sign-and-trade deal involving Kemba Walker. As part of the deal, Rozier received a new three-year, $56.7 million contract.

On December 18, 2019, Rozier scored a then-career-high 35 points in a 100–98 loss to the Cleveland Cavaliers. He would surpass that on March 8, 2020, scoring 40 points in a 143–138 double-overtime loss to the Atlanta Hawks. The contract the Hornets gave to Rozier at that time was criticized following a poor performance in the 2019 playoffs and losing their longtime star Kemba Walker. Rozier's performance improved throughout the rest of the season.

On December 23, 2020, Rozier put up a then-career-high 42 points, along with three rebounds, two assists, two steals and a block, in a 121–114 loss to the Cleveland Cavaliers. He surpassed this mark with a new career-high 43 points in a 112–110 loss to the New Orleans Pelicans on May 9, 2021. The Hornets finished with a 33–39 record and qualified for the newly implemented play-in tournament. However, on May 18, the team's season ended with a 144–117 play-in loss to the Indiana Pacers, which Rozier recorded 16 points, eight rebounds and six assists.

On August 24, 2021, Rozier signed a four-year, $97 million contract extension with the Hornets. On December 29, he scored a season-high 35 points, alongside seven rebounds, three assists, two steals and two blocks, in a 116–108 victory over the Indiana Pacers. On February 12, 2022, Rozier again scored 35 points, alongside 10 rebounds and nine assists, in a 125–118 loss to the Memphis Grizzlies. The Hornets finished the season with a 43–39 record and qualified for the play-in tournament for the second straight year, but their season ended on April 13, with a 132–103 play-in loss to the Atlanta Hawks, despite 21 points, four rebounds and three assists from Rozier.

On January 6, 2023, Rozier scored a season-high 39 points, alongside two rebounds and four assists, in a 138–109 victory over the Milwaukee Bucks. On January 21, he recorded 34 points, three rebounds, five assists and four steals in a 122–118 victory over the Atlanta Hawks.

=== Miami Heat (2024–2026) ===
On January 23, 2024, Rozier was traded to the Miami Heat in exchange for Kyle Lowry and a protected first-round draft pick. The next day, Rozier made his Heat debut, putting up nine points, five assists, four rebounds, and two steals in a 105–96 loss to the Memphis Grizzlies. He made 31 appearances (30 starts) for Miami during the 2023–24 season, averaging 16.4 points, 4.2 rebounds, and 4.6 assists.

Rozier played in 64 games (including 23 starts) for Miami during the 2024–25 season, recording averages of 10.6 points, 3.7 rebounds, and 2.6 assists.

Rozier was placed on indefinite unpaid leave by the NBA in October 2025 and ordered to stay away from the Heat, one game into the 2025–26 season, pending resolution of an FBI case against Rozier related to sports gambling fraud. On April 10, 2026, Rozier was waived by the Heat.

== Career statistics ==
Legend
GP	Games played	GS	Games started	MPG	Minutes per game
FG%	Field goal percentage	3P%	3-point field goal percentage	FT%	Free throw percentage
RPG	Rebounds per game	APG	Assists per game	SPG	Steals per game
BPG	Blocks per game	PPG	Points per game	**Bold**	Career high

=== NBA ===
==== Regular season ====
Year	Team	GP	GS	MPG	FG%	3P%	FT%	RPG	APG	SPG	BPG	PPG
2015–16	Boston	39	0	8.0	.274	.222	.800	1.6	.9	.2	.0	1.8
2016–17	Boston	74	0	17.1	.367	.318	.773	3.1	1.8	.6	.1	5.5
2017–18	Boston	**80**	16	25.9	.395	.381	.772	**4.7**	2.9	1.0	.2	11.3
2018–19	Boston	79	14	22.7	.387	.353	.785	3.9	2.9	.9	.3	9.0
2019–20	Charlotte	63	63	34.4	.423	**.407**	.874	4.4	4.1	1.0	.2	18.0
2020–21	Charlotte	69	69	34.5	.450	.389	.817	4.4	4.2	**1.3**	**.4**	20.4
2021–22	Charlotte	73	**73**	33.7	.444	.374	.852	4.3	4.5	**1.3**	.3	19.3
2022–23	Charlotte	63	63	35.3	.415	.327	.809	4.1	5.1	1.2	.3	21.1
2023–24	Charlotte	30	30	**35.5**	**.459**	.358	.845	3.9	**6.6**	1.1	**.4**	**23.2**
2023–24	Miami	31	30	31.5	.423	.371	**.913**	4.2	4.6	1.0	.3	16.4
2024–25	Miami	64	23	25.9	.391	.295	.852	3.7	2.6	.6	.2	10.6
Career		665	381	27.6	.418	.361	.829	3.9	3.5	.9	.2	13.9

==== Playoffs ====
Year	Team	GP	GS	MPG	FG%	3P%	FT%	RPG	APG	SPG	BPG	PPG
2016	Boston	5	0	19.8	.391	.364	**1.000**	3.4	1.2	.2	**.6**	4.8
2017	Boston	17	0	16.3	.402	**.368**	.800	2.6	1.9	.6	.2	5.6
2018	Boston	**19**	**19**	**36.6**	**.406**	.347	.821	**5.3**	**5.7**	**1.3**	.3	**16.5**
2019	Boston	9	0	18.0	.322	.235	.750	4.3	1.9	.4	.2	6.4
Career		50	19	24.7	.393	.335	.809	4.0	3.3	.8	.3	9.8

=== College ===
Year	Team	GP	GS	MPG	FG%	3P%	FT%	RPG	APG	SPG	BPG	PPG
2013–14	Louisville	**37**	10	18.9	.401	**.371**	.712	3.1	1.8	1.0	.1	7.0
2014–15	Louisville	36	**35**	**35.0**	**.411**	.306	**.790**	**5.6**	**3.0**	**2.0**	**.2**	**17.1**
Career		73	45	26.8	.408	.331	.772	4.3	2.4	1.5	.1	12.0

== Personal life ==
Rozier gained social media notoriety due to his appearance on NBA TV's The Starters when he made his 'family recipe' of a sandwich with spaghetti, ranch and sugar. Rozier was a co-host of the Mickstape podcast on the Barstool Sports network.

=== Gambling investigations ===
On January 30, 2025, the NBA announced that Rozier was under investigation by federal authorities in connection with a sports betting scandal over a 2023 game, when he was with the Charlotte Hornets, where a high volume of bets were placed on the under for Rozier's performance, in which Rozier left the game with a foot injury after nine minutes. Unlike the situation with Jontay Porter (which led to Porter not playing any more games for the rest of the season before being permanently banned from the NBA), the NBA did allow Rozier to continue playing with the Miami Heat, since Rozier was not charged with any crimes or personally accused of any wrongdoing at the time.

On October 23, 2025, Rozier was arrested along with Portland Trail Blazers head coach Chauncey Billups and former NBA player Damon Jones in connection to a much wider federal investigation into sports betting and gambling by various criminal organizations including the Bonanno, Gambino, Genovese and Lucchese crime families of the American Mafia. On December 8, Rozier pled not guilty to federal charges of conspiracy to commit wire fraud and money laundering.
