= 2020–21 NBA season =

75th NBA season

- League: National Basketball Association
- Sport: Basketball
- Duration: December 22, 2020 – May 16, 2021; May 18–21, 2021 (Play-in tournament); May 22 – July 3, 2021 (Playoffs); July 6–20, 2021 (Finals)
- Games: 72
- Teams: 30
- TV partner(s): ABC, TNT, ESPN, NBA TV

Draft
- Top draft pick: Anthony Edwards
- Picked by: Minnesota Timberwolves

Regular season
- Top seed: Utah Jazz
- Season MVP: Nikola Jokić (Denver)
- Top scorer: Stephen Curry (Golden State)

Playoffs
- Eastern champions: Milwaukee Bucks
- Eastern runners-up: Atlanta Hawks
- Western champions: Phoenix Suns
- Western runners-up: Los Angeles Clippers

Finals
- Champions: Milwaukee Bucks
- Runners-up: Phoenix Suns
- Finals MVP: Giannis Antetokounmpo (Milwaukee)

NBA seasons
- ← 2019–20 2021–22 →

The 2020–21 NBA season was the 75th season of the National Basketball Association (NBA), though the 75th anniversary was not celebrated until the following season. Due to the COVID-19 pandemic, the regular season was reduced to 72 games for each team, and began on December 22, 2020. The season started just 72 days after the completion of the 2020 NBA Finals, the shortest off-season in league history. The 2021 NBA All-Star Game was played on March 7, at State Farm Arena in Atlanta, and was won by Team LeBron, 170–150. For the first time, the NBA staged a play-in tournament for teams ranked 7th through 10th in each conference from May 18 to 21. The playoffs then ran under the standard 16-team playoff format from May 22 to July 20, 2021. Due to COVID-19 cross-border restrictions imposed by the Canadian government, the Toronto Raptors played their 2020–21 home games at Amalie Arena in Tampa, Florida.

== Transactions ==
=== Retirement ===
- On September 8, 2020, Marvin Williams announced his retirement from the NBA. Williams played for four teams during his 15-year NBA career.
- On September 14, 2020, Leandro Barbosa announced his retirement from the NBA. Barbosa played 14 seasons in the NBA, winning one championship with the Golden State Warriors in 2015.
- On October 24, 2020, Kevin Séraphin announced his retirement from the NBA. Séraphin played for three teams during his seven-year NBA career.
- On November 16, 2020, Corey Brewer announced his retirement from the NBA. Brewer played for 12 years in the NBA for eight teams, winning one championship with the Dallas Mavericks in 2011.
- On November 18, 2020, Dorell Wright announced his retirement from the NBA. Wright played for four teams during his 11-year NBA career, winning one championship with the Miami Heat in 2006.
- On November 25, 2020, Aaron Brooks announced his retirement from the NBA. Brooks played for seven teams during his 13-year NBA career.
- On November 30, 2020, Andrew Bogut announced his retirement from the NBA. Bogut played for five teams during his 14-year NBA career, winning one championship with the Golden State Warriors in 2015.
- On November 30, 2020, Evan Turner announced his retirement from the NBA. Turner played 10 seasons for five teams during his time in the NBA.
- On February 4, 2021, Lucas Nogueira announced his retirement from the NBA. Nogueira played for the Toronto Raptors for his entire four-year NBA career.
- On March 1, 2021, Joakim Noah announced his retirement from the NBA. Noah played for four teams during his 13-year NBA career. He was the 2014 Defensive Player of the Year, and a two-time All-Star.
- On March 31, 2021, Thabo Sefolosha announced his retirement from the NBA. Sefolosha played for five teams during his 14-year NBA career.
- On April 15, 2021, LaMarcus Aldridge announced his retirement from the NBA as a result of heart issues and an irregular heartbeat after games. Aldridge played for three teams during his 15-year NBA career, and was a seven-time All-Star.
- On May 19, 2021, Jeremy Lin announced his retirement from the NBA. Lin played for eight teams during his nine-year NBA career, winning one championship with the Toronto Raptors in 2019.

=== Free agency ===
Free agency negotiations were scheduled to begin on October 18, 2020, but that date was delayed. On November 9, it was announced that free agency would begin on November 20 at 6 p.m. ET, with signings permitted starting at 12 p.m. ET on November 22.

=== Coaching changes ===
Coaching changes
Team	2019–20 season	2020–21 season
Off-season
Brooklyn Nets	Jacque Vaughn (interim)	Steve Nash
Chicago Bulls	Jim Boylen	Billy Donovan
Houston Rockets	Mike D'Antoni	Stephen Silas
Indiana Pacers	Nate McMillan	Nate Bjorkgren
Los Angeles Clippers	Doc Rivers	Tyronn Lue
New Orleans Pelicans	Alvin Gentry	Stan Van Gundy
New York Knicks	Mike Miller (interim)	Tom Thibodeau
Oklahoma City Thunder	Billy Donovan	Mark Daigneault
Philadelphia 76ers	Brett Brown	Doc Rivers
In-season
Atlanta Hawks	Lloyd Pierce	Nate McMillan (interim)
Minnesota Timberwolves	Ryan Saunders	Chris Finch

==== Off-season ====
- On July 30, 2020, the New York Knicks hired Tom Thibodeau as their new head coach.
- On August 14, 2020, the Chicago Bulls fired head coach Jim Boylen after two seasons.
- On August 15, 2020, the New Orleans Pelicans fired head coach Alvin Gentry after five seasons with the team.
- On August 24, 2020, the Philadelphia 76ers fired head coach Brett Brown after seven seasons with the team.
- On August 26, 2020, the Indiana Pacers fired head coach Nate McMillan after four seasons with the team.
- On September 3, 2020, the Brooklyn Nets hired Steve Nash as their new head coach.
- On September 8, 2020, the Oklahoma City Thunder and head coach Billy Donovan mutually agreed to part ways after five seasons.
- On September 13, 2020, Mike D'Antoni informed the Houston Rockets that he would not return as head coach after coaching the team for four seasons.
- On September 22, 2020, the Chicago Bulls hired Billy Donovan as their new head coach.
- On September 28, 2020, the Los Angeles Clippers and head coach Doc Rivers mutually agreed to part ways after seven seasons with the team.
- On October 3, 2020, the Philadelphia 76ers hired Doc Rivers as their new head coach.
- On October 20, 2020, the Indiana Pacers hired Nate Bjorkgren as their new head coach.
- On October 20, 2020, the Los Angeles Clippers promoted Tyronn Lue as their new head coach.
- On October 22, 2020, the New Orleans Pelicans hired Stan Van Gundy as their new head coach.
- On October 30, 2020, the Houston Rockets hired Stephen Silas as their new head coach.
- On November 11, 2020, the Oklahoma City Thunder promoted Mark Daigneault as their new head coach.

==== In-season ====
- On February 21, 2021, the Minnesota Timberwolves fired head coach Ryan Saunders after three seasons with the team.
- On February 22, 2021, the Minnesota Timberwolves hired Chris Finch as their new head coach.
- On March 1, 2021, the Atlanta Hawks fired head coach Lloyd Pierce after two seasons with the team, and named Nate McMillan as interim head coach.

== Preseason ==
The COVID-19 pandemic in North America, which pushed the conclusion of the previous 2019–20 season and playoffs into the fall, had delayed the start date of training camp to November 10, 2020. The preseason began on December 11 and ended on December 19.

== Regular season ==
The start of the 2020–21 regular season was delayed because of the COVID-19 pandemic. The NBA initially set a target date of December 1, 2020, to start the regular season. However, NBA Commissioner Adam Silver suggested further delaying the season until at least January because local health orders at each NBA city would limit fan attendance. The NBA receives 40 percent of its revenue from attendance, and thus delaying the season until it was safer to let more fans into the arenas would ease the financial pain. The NBA also contemplated organizing the schedule such that teams would have less travel, with back-to-back games in the same cities against the same opponent. National Basketball Players Association executive director Michele Roberts suggested that the season might eventually have to begin within a "bubble" environment, similar to the 2020 playoffs.

On October 13, the NBA delayed the targeted start date of the regular season from December 2020 to Martin Luther King Jr. Day, January 18, 2021. Later in October, Sports Illustrated reported that the NBA was targeting December 22, 2020, as the first day of the season. On November 5, 2020, the National Basketball Players Association (NBPA) tentatively approved a 72-game regular season that began on December 22, 2020. The season featured a condensed schedule so that the NBA Finals could conclude by July 22, allowing NBA players to participate in the 2020 Summer Olympics; the Olympics were postponed to 2021 because of the COVID-19 pandemic in Japan.

On November 17, the NBA announced that the 72-game regular season would run from December 22 through May 16. Each team would play three games against each opponent from its own conference and two games against each interconference opponent. The season would include a six-day All-Star break from March 5 to 10. While the All-Star Game (which was originally scheduled for Indianapolis) was initially considered unlikely, the NBA announced in February that the 2021 NBA All-Star Game would be held in Atlanta on March 7, 2021. The schedule was released in two parts; the first half was released in early December, while the second half was released in the latter part of the first half.

It was the latest a season had started, and with the fewest games per team, since the 2011–12 season. That season, each team played only 66 games starting on Christmas Day; this was due to the aftermath of the 2011 NBA lockout.

Eastern Conference

Atlantic Division	W	L	PCT	GB	Home	Road	Div	GP
c − Philadelphia 76ers	49	23	.681	–	29‍–‍7	20‍–‍16	10–2	72
x – Brooklyn Nets	48	24	.667	1.0	28‍–‍8	20‍–‍16	8–4	72
x – New York Knicks	41	31	.569	8.0	25‍–‍11	16‍–‍20	4–8	72
x – Boston Celtics	36	36	.500	13.0	21‍–‍15	15‍–‍21	4–8	72
Toronto Raptors	27	45	.375	22.0	16‍–‍20	11‍–‍25	4–8	72

Central Division	W	L	PCT	GB	Home	Road	Div	GP
y – Milwaukee Bucks	46	26	.639	–	26‍–‍10	20‍–‍16	11–1	72
pi – Indiana Pacers	34	38	.472	12.0	13‍–‍23	21‍–‍15	7–5	72
Chicago Bulls	31	41	.431	15.0	15‍–‍21	16‍–‍20	7–5	72
Cleveland Cavaliers	22	50	.306	24.0	13‍–‍23	9‍–‍27	4–8	72
Detroit Pistons	20	52	.278	26.0	13‍–‍23	7‍–‍29	1–11	72

Southeast Division	W	L	PCT	GB	Home	Road	Div	GP
y – Atlanta Hawks	41	31	.569	–	25‍–‍11	16‍–‍20	9–3	72
x – Miami Heat	40	32	.556	1.0	21‍–‍15	19‍–‍17	6–6	72
x – Washington Wizards	34	38	.472	7.0	19‍–‍17	15‍–‍21	3–9	72
pi – Charlotte Hornets	33	39	.458	8.0	18‍–‍19	15‍–‍20	8–4	72
Orlando Magic	21	51	.292	20.0	11‍–‍25	10‍–‍26	4–8	72

Western Conference

Northwest Division	W	L	PCT	GB	Home	Road	Div	GP
z – Utah Jazz	52	20	.722	–	31‍–‍5	21‍–‍15	7–5	72
x – Denver Nuggets	47	25	.653	5.0	25‍–‍11	22‍–‍14	9–3	72
x – Portland Trail Blazers	42	30	.583	10.0	20‍–‍16	22‍–‍14	6–6	72
Minnesota Timberwolves	23	49	.319	29.0	13‍–‍23	10‍–‍26	5–7	72
Oklahoma City Thunder	22	50	.306	30.0	10‍–‍26	12‍–‍24	3–9	72

Pacific Division	W	L	PCT	GB	Home	Road	Div	GP
y – Phoenix Suns	51	21	.708	–	27‍–‍9	24‍–‍12	7–5	72
x – Los Angeles Clippers	47	25	.653	4.0	26‍–‍10	21‍–‍15	9–3	72
x – Los Angeles Lakers	42	30	.583	9.0	21‍–‍15	21‍–‍15	4–8	72
pi – Golden State Warriors	39	33	.542	12.0	25‍–‍11	14‍–‍22	5–7	72
Sacramento Kings	31	41	.431	20.0	16‍–‍20	15‍–‍21	5–7	72

Southwest Division	W	L	PCT	GB	Home	Road	Div	GP
y – Dallas Mavericks	42	30	.583	–	21‍–‍15	21‍–‍15	7–5	72
x – Memphis Grizzlies	38	34	.528	4.0	18‍–‍18	20‍–‍16	6–6	72
pi – San Antonio Spurs	33	39	.458	9.0	14‍–‍22	19‍–‍17	6–6	72
New Orleans Pelicans	31	41	.431	11.0	18‍–‍18	13‍–‍23	6–6	72
Houston Rockets	17	55	.236	25.0	9‍–‍27	8‍–‍28	5–7	72

=== By conference ===
Eastern Conference
#	Team	W	L	PCT	GB	GP
1	c − Philadelphia 76ers *	49	23	.681	–	72
2	x – Brooklyn Nets	48	24	.667	1.0	72
3	y – Milwaukee Bucks *	46	26	.639	3.0	72
4	x – New York Knicks	41	31	.569	8.0	72
5	y – Atlanta Hawks *	41	31	.569	8.0	72
6	x – Miami Heat	40	32	.556	9.0	72
7	x – Boston Celtics	36	36	.500	13.0	72
8	x – Washington Wizards	34	38	.472	15.0	72
9	pi – Indiana Pacers	34	38	.472	15.0	72
10	pi – Charlotte Hornets	33	39	.458	16.0	72
11	Chicago Bulls	31	41	.431	18.0	72
12	Toronto Raptors	27	45	.375	22.0	72
13	Cleveland Cavaliers	22	50	.306	27.0	72
14	Orlando Magic	21	51	.292	28.0	72
15	Detroit Pistons	20	52	.278	29.0	72

Western Conference
#	Team	W	L	PCT	GB	GP
1	z – Utah Jazz *	52	20	.722	–	72
2	y – Phoenix Suns *	51	21	.708	1.0	72
3	x – Denver Nuggets	47	25	.653	5.0	72
4	x – Los Angeles Clippers	47	25	.653	5.0	72
5	y – Dallas Mavericks *	42	30	.583	10.0	72
6	x – Portland Trail Blazers	42	30	.583	10.0	72
7	x – Los Angeles Lakers	42	30	.583	10.0	72
8	pi – Golden State Warriors	39	33	.542	13.0	72
9	x – Memphis Grizzlies	38	34	.528	14.0	72
10	pi – San Antonio Spurs	33	39	.458	19.0	72
11	New Orleans Pelicans	31	41	.431	21.0	72
12	Sacramento Kings	31	41	.431	21.0	72
13	Minnesota Timberwolves	23	49	.319	29.0	72
14	Oklahoma City Thunder	22	50	.306	30.0	72
15	Houston Rockets	17	55	.236	35.0	72

Notes

- z – Clinched home court advantage for the entire playoffs
- c – Clinched home court advantage for the conference playoffs
- y – Clinched division title
- x – Clinched playoff spot
- * – Division leader
- pi - Clinched play-in spot

=== Postponed games due to COVID-19 ===
- December 23: Oklahoma City vs. Houston – At least three Houston players tested positive or inconclusive, four other players were quarantined after contact tracing, and James Harden was unavailable after violating health and safety protocols.
- January 10: Miami vs. Boston – Ongoing contact tracing with Miami caused Miami to not have the required minimum of eight players available for the game.
- January 11: New Orleans vs. Dallas
- January 12: Boston vs. Chicago
- January 13:
  - Orlando vs. Boston – Due to testing and contact tracing, Boston did not have the required minimum of eight players available for the game.
  - Utah vs. Washington – Washington did not have the required minimum of eight players available for the game.
  - Atlanta vs. Phoenix – Phoenix did not have the required minimum of eight players available.
- January 15:
  - Golden State vs. Phoenix – Phoenix continued to not have the required minimum of eight players available due to testing and contact tracing.
  - Washington vs. Detroit – Washington continued to not have the required minimum of eight players available.
  - Memphis vs. Minnesota – Minnesota did not have the required minimum of eight players.
- January 16: Indiana vs. Phoenix – Phoenix still did not have enough available players.
- January 17:
  - Cleveland vs. Washington – Washington still did not have enough available players.
  - Philadelphia vs. Oklahoma City – Philadelphia did not have enough available players due to ongoing contact tracing.
- January 18: Cleveland vs. Washington – Washington continued to not have enough players.
- January 20:
  - Washington vs. Charlotte – Washington continued to not have enough players.
  - Memphis vs. Portland – Memphis had an outbreak.
- January 22:
  - Washington vs. Milwaukee – Washington's sixth consecutive postponed game.
  - Memphis vs. Portland – Memphis did not have enough available players due to ongoing contact tracing.
- January 24: Sacramento vs. Memphis – Memphis did not have enough available players due to ongoing contact tracing.
- January 25:
  - Sacramento vs. Memphis – Memphis did not have enough available players due to ongoing contact tracing.
  - San Antonio vs. New Orleans – Neither team had enough available players due to ongoing contact tracing.
- January 27: Chicago vs. Memphis – Memphis did not have enough available players due to ongoing contact tracing.
- February 1: Detroit vs. Denver – Detroit did not have enough players due to ongoing contact tracing.
- February 7: Portland vs. Charlotte – This game was moved to the second half of the season, allowing the Washington vs. Charlotte game that was originally scheduled on January 20 to be rescheduled on this day instead.
- February 16: San Antonio vs. Detroit – San Antonio did not have enough players due to ongoing contact tracing.
- February 17:
  - San Antonio vs. Cleveland – San Antonio continued to not have enough players due to ongoing contact tracing.
  - Chicago vs. Charlotte – Charlotte did not have enough players due to ongoing contact tracing.
- February 19: Detroit vs. Charlotte – Charlotte continued to be under COVID-19 protocol.
- February 20: San Antonio vs. New York – San Antonio continued to be under COVID-19 protocol.
- February 22: San Antonio vs. Indiana – San Antonio continued to be under COVID-19 protocol.
- February 28: Chicago vs. Toronto – Toronto had positive COVID-19 test results.

=== Postponed games due to other reasons ===
- February 17: Detroit vs. Dallas – Game postponed due to winter storm in Texas.
- February 19: Dallas vs. Houston – Game postponed due to winter storm in Texas.
- February 20: Indiana vs. Houston – Game postponed due to winter storm in Texas.
- April 12: Brooklyn vs. Minnesota – Game postponed due to feared unrest in response to the killing of Daunte Wright in nearby Brooklyn Center, Minnesota.

== All-Star Weekend ==
The 2021 NBA All-Star Game was played on March 7, 2021. Teams were captained by LeBron James and Kevin Durant, and Team LeBron won the game 170–150.

== Play-in tournament ==
The NBA staged a play-in tournament for teams ranked 7th through 10th in each conference after regular season, played from May 18 to 21, to determine in each conference 7th and 8th seeded teams making playoffs. To this end in each conference: 1) The 7th-place team hosted the 8th place team with the winner clinching the 7th seed in the playoffs. 2) The 9th-place team hosted the 10th-place team with the loser being eliminated from playoff contention. 3) The 7th-vs.-8th-place game's loser then hosted the 9th-vs.-10th-place game's winner, with the winner clinching the 8th seed and the loser being eliminated.

=== Eastern Conference Play-in ===
Play-in games
7	Boston	118
8	Washington	100
9	Indiana	144
10	Charlotte	117

No. 8 seed game
8	Washington	142
9	Indiana	115

Final seeds
7	Boston	No. 7 seed
8	Washington	No. 8 seed

Bold Game winner
Italic Team with home-court advantage

=== Western Conference Play-in ===
Play-in games
7	LA Lakers	103
8	Golden State	100
9	Memphis	100
10	San Antonio	96

No. 8 seed game
8	Golden State	112
9	Memphis	117 (OT)

Final seeds
7	LA Lakers	No. 7 seed
9	Memphis	No. 8 seed

Bold Game winner
Italic Team with home-court advantage

== Playoffs ==
The playoffs began on May 22 and operated under the standard 16-team playoff format, with four rounds of best-of-seven series. The 2021 NBA Finals began on July 6 and concluded on July 20.

=== Bracket ===
First round	Conference semifinals
E1	Philadelphia*	4
E8	Washington	1
E1	Philadelphia*	3
E5	Atlanta*	4
E4	New York	1
E5	Atlanta*	4
Eastern Conference
E3	Milwaukee*	4
E6	Miami	0
E3	Milwaukee*	4
E2	Brooklyn	3
E2	Brooklyn	4
E7	Boston	1
W1	Utah*	4
W8	Memphis	1
W1	Utah*	2
W4	LA Clippers	4
W4	LA Clippers	4
W5	Dallas*	3
Western Conference
W3	Denver	4
W6	Portland	2
W3	Denver	0
W2	Phoenix*	4
W2	Phoenix*	4
W7	LA Lakers	2

Conference finals
E5	Atlanta*	2
E3	Milwaukee*	4
W4	LA Clippers	2
W2	Phoenix*	4

NBA Finals
E3	Milwaukee*	4
W2	Phoenix*	2

- * Division winner
- Bold Series winner
- Italic Team with home-court advantage

== Statistics ==
=== Individual statistic leaders ===
Category	Player	Team(s)	Statistic
Points per game	Stephen Curry	Golden State Warriors	32.0
Rebounds per game	Clint Capela	Atlanta Hawks	14.3
Assists per game	Russell Westbrook	Washington Wizards	11.7
Steals per game	Jimmy Butler	Miami Heat	2.1
Blocks per game	Myles Turner	Indiana Pacers	3.4
Turnovers per game	Russell Westbrook	Washington Wizards	4.8
Fouls per game	Karl-Anthony Towns	Minnesota Timberwolves	3.7
Minutes per game	Julius Randle	New York Knicks	37.6
FG%	Rudy Gobert	Utah Jazz	67.4%
FT%	Chris Paul	Phoenix Suns	93.4%
3FG%	Joe Harris	Brooklyn Nets	47.5%
Efficiency per game	Nikola Jokić	Denver Nuggets	35.9
Double-doubles	Nikola Jokić	Denver Nuggets	60
Triple-doubles	Russell Westbrook	Washington Wizards	38

=== Individual game highs ===
Category	Player	Team	Statistic
Points	Stephen Curry	Golden State Warriors	62
Rebounds	Enes Freedom	Portland Trail Blazers	30
Assists	Russell Westbrook	Washington Wizards	24
Steals	T. J. McConnell	Indiana Pacers	10
Blocks	Clint Capela	Atlanta Hawks	10
Three-pointers	Stephen Curry	Golden State Warriors	11
Three-pointers	Fred VanVleet	Toronto Raptors	11

=== Team statistic leaders ===
Category	Team	Statistic
Points per game	Milwaukee Bucks	120.1
Rebounds per game	Utah Jazz	48.3
Assists per game	Golden State Warriors	27.7
Steals per game	Memphis Grizzlies	9.1
Blocks per game	Indiana Pacers	6.4
Turnovers per game	Oklahoma City Thunder	16.1
Fouls per game	Washington Wizards	21.6
FG%	Brooklyn Nets	49.4%
FT%	Los Angeles Clippers	83.9%
3FG%	Los Angeles Clippers	41.1%
+/−	Utah Jazz	+9.3

== Awards ==
=== Yearly awards ===
2020–21 NBA awards
Award	Recipient(s)	Finalists
Most Valuable Player	Nikola Jokić (Denver Nuggets)	Stephen Curry (Golden State Warriors); Joel Embiid (Philadelphia 76ers)
Defensive Player of the Year	Rudy Gobert (Utah Jazz)	Draymond Green (Golden State Warriors); Ben Simmons (Philadelphia 76ers)
Rookie of the Year	LaMelo Ball (Charlotte Hornets)	Anthony Edwards (Minnesota Timberwolves); Tyrese Haliburton (Sacramento Kings)
Sixth Man of the Year	Jordan Clarkson (Utah Jazz)	Joe Ingles (Utah Jazz); Derrick Rose (New York Knicks)
Most Improved Player	Julius Randle (New York Knicks)	Jerami Grant (Detroit Pistons); Michael Porter Jr. (Denver Nuggets)
Coach of the Year	Tom Thibodeau (New York Knicks)	Quin Snyder (Utah Jazz); Monty Williams (Phoenix Suns)
Executive of the Year	James Jones (Phoenix Suns)	Dennis Lindsey (Utah Jazz); Sean Marks (Brooklyn Nets)
NBA Sportsmanship Award	Jrue Holiday (Milwaukee Bucks)	Bam Adebayo (Miami Heat); Harrison Barnes (Sacramento Kings); Josh Okogie (Minnesota Timberwolves); Kemba Walker (Boston Celtics); Derrick White (San Antonio Spurs)
Twyman–Stokes Teammate of the Year Award	Damian Lillard (Portland Trail Blazers)	Udonis Haslem (Miami Heat); Chris Paul (Phoenix Suns)
Community Assist Award	Devin Booker (Phoenix Suns)	
Kareem Abdul-Jabbar Social Justice Champion Award	Carmelo Anthony (Portland Trail Blazers)	Harrison Barnes (Sacramento Kings); Tobias Harris (Philadelphia 76ers); Jrue Holiday (Milwaukee Bucks); Juan Toscano-Anderson (Golden State Warriors)

- All-NBA First Team:
  - F Giannis Antetokounmpo, Milwaukee Bucks
  - F Kawhi Leonard, Los Angeles Clippers
  - C Nikola Jokić, Denver Nuggets
  - G Stephen Curry, Golden State Warriors
  - G Luka Dončić, Dallas Mavericks
- All-NBA Second Team:
  - F Julius Randle, New York Knicks
  - F LeBron James, Los Angeles Lakers
  - C Joel Embiid, Philadelphia 76ers
  - G Damian Lillard, Portland Trail Blazers
  - G Chris Paul, Phoenix Suns
- All-NBA Third Team:
  - F Jimmy Butler, Miami Heat
  - F Paul George, Los Angeles Clippers
  - C Rudy Gobert, Utah Jazz
  - G Bradley Beal, Washington Wizards
  - G Kyrie Irving, Brooklyn Nets

- NBA All-Defensive First Team:
  - F Draymond Green, Golden State Warriors
  - F Giannis Antetokounmpo, Milwaukee Bucks
  - C Rudy Gobert, Utah Jazz
  - G Ben Simmons, Philadelphia 76ers
  - G Jrue Holiday, Milwaukee Bucks
- NBA All-Defensive Second Team:
  - F Bam Adebayo, Miami Heat
  - F Kawhi Leonard, Los Angeles Clippers
  - C Joel Embiid, Philadelphia 76ers
  - G Jimmy Butler, Miami Heat
  - G Matisse Thybulle, Philadelphia 76ers

- NBA All-Rookie First Team:
  - LaMelo Ball, Charlotte Hornets
  - Anthony Edwards, Minnesota Timberwolves
  - Tyrese Haliburton, Sacramento Kings
  - Saddiq Bey, Detroit Pistons
  - Jae'Sean Tate, Houston Rockets
- NBA All-Rookie Second Team:
  - Immanuel Quickley, New York Knicks
  - Desmond Bane, Memphis Grizzlies
  - Isaiah Stewart, Detroit Pistons
  - Isaac Okoro, Cleveland Cavaliers
  - Patrick Williams, Chicago Bulls

=== Players of the Week ===
The following players were named the Eastern and Western Conference Players of the Week.

Week	Eastern Conference	Western Conference	Ref
December 22–27	Domantas Sabonis (Indiana Pacers) (1/1)	Brandon Ingram (New Orleans Pelicans) (1/1)	
December 28 – January 3	Tobias Harris (Philadelphia 76ers) (1/1)	Stephen Curry (Golden State Warriors) (1/2)	
January 4–10	Jayson Tatum (Boston Celtics) (1/3)	Luka Dončić (Dallas Mavericks) (1/3)	
January 11–17	Kevin Durant (Brooklyn Nets) (1/1)	Damian Lillard (Portland Trail Blazers) (1/3)	
January 18–24	Joel Embiid (Philadelphia 76ers) (1/1)	Nikola Jokić (Denver Nuggets) (1/3)	
January 25–31	James Harden (Brooklyn Nets) (1/2)	Nikola Jokić (Denver Nuggets) (2/3)	
February 1–7	Giannis Antetokounmpo (Milwaukee Bucks) (1/3)	De'Aaron Fox (Sacramento Kings) (1/2)	
February 8–14	Saddiq Bey (Detroit Pistons) (1/1)	Devin Booker (Phoenix Suns) (1/3)	
February 15–21	James Harden (Brooklyn Nets) (2/2)	Damian Lillard (Portland Trail Blazers) (2/3)	
February 22–28	Giannis Antetokounmpo (Milwaukee Bucks) (2/3)	Devin Booker (Phoenix Suns) (2/3)	
March 15–21	Giannis Antetokounmpo (Milwaukee Bucks) (3/3)	Nikola Jokić (Denver Nuggets) (3/3)	
March 22–28	Terry Rozier (Charlotte Hornets) (1/1)	De'Aaron Fox (Sacramento Kings) (2/2)	
March 29 – April 4	Jrue Holiday (Milwaukee Bucks) (1/1)	Luka Dončić (Dallas Mavericks) (2/3)	
April 5–11	Jayson Tatum (Boston Celtics) (2/3)	Paul George (Los Angeles Clippers) (1/1)	
April 12–18	Julius Randle (New York Knicks) (1/1)	Stephen Curry (Golden State Warriors) (2/2)	
April 19–25	Bradley Beal (Washington Wizards) (1/1)	Luka Dončić (Dallas Mavericks) (3/3)	
April 26 – May 2	Jayson Tatum (Boston Celtics) (3/3)	Devin Booker (Phoenix Suns) (3/3)	
May 3–9	Russell Westbrook (Washington Wizards) (1/1)	Bojan Bogdanović (Utah Jazz) (1/1)	
May 10–16	Trae Young (Atlanta Hawks) (1/1)	Damian Lillard (Portland Trail Blazers) (3/3)	

=== Players of the Month ===
The following players were named the Eastern and Western Conference Players of the Month.

Month	Eastern Conference	Western Conference	Ref
December/January	Joel Embiid (Philadelphia 76ers) (1/1)	Nikola Jokić (Denver Nuggets) (1/2)	
February	James Harden (Brooklyn Nets) (1/2)	Devin Booker (Phoenix Suns) (1/1)	
March	James Harden (Brooklyn Nets) (2/2)	Nikola Jokić (Denver Nuggets) (2/2)	
April	Julius Randle (New York Knicks) (1/1)	Stephen Curry (Golden State Warriors) (1/2)	
May	Russell Westbrook (Washington Wizards) (1/1)	Stephen Curry (Golden State Warriors) (2/2)	

=== Rookies of the Month ===
The following players were named the Eastern and Western Conference Rookies of the Month.

Month	Eastern Conference	Western Conference	Ref
December/January	LaMelo Ball (Charlotte Hornets) (1/3)	Tyrese Haliburton (Sacramento Kings) (1/2)	
February	LaMelo Ball (Charlotte Hornets) (2/3)	Tyrese Haliburton (Sacramento Kings) (2/2)	
March	LaMelo Ball (Charlotte Hornets) (3/3)	Anthony Edwards (Minnesota Timberwolves) (1/3)	
April	Malachi Flynn (Toronto Raptors) (1/1)	Anthony Edwards (Minnesota Timberwolves) (2/3)	
May	R. J. Hampton (Orlando Magic) (1/1)	Anthony Edwards (Minnesota Timberwolves) (3/3)	

=== Coaches of the Month ===
The following coaches were named the Eastern and Western Conference Coaches of the Month.

Month	Eastern Conference	Western Conference	Ref
December/January	Doc Rivers (Philadelphia 76ers) (1/1)	Quin Snyder (Utah Jazz) (1/2)	
February	Steve Nash (Brooklyn Nets) (1/1)	Quin Snyder (Utah Jazz) (2/2)	
March	Nate McMillan (Atlanta Hawks) (1/1)	Monty Williams (Phoenix Suns) (1/1)	
April	Scott Brooks (Washington Wizards) (1/1)	Michael Malone (Denver Nuggets) (1/1)	
May	Tom Thibodeau (New York Knicks) (1/1)	Terry Stotts (Portland Trail Blazers) (1/1)	

== Uniforms ==
On July 21, 2020, the NBA and Nike announced that the "Statement Edition" uniforms would switch to the Air Jordan label.

== Arenas ==
- The Denver Nuggets' home arena, formerly known as the Pepsi Center, was renamed Ball Arena on October 22, 2020.
- The Phoenix Suns' home arena, formerly known as Talking Stick Resort Arena, was renamed Footprint Center (previously Phoenix Suns Arena) after the naming rights deal expired on November 6, 2020, to July 16, 2021.

=== Temporary relocation of the Toronto Raptors to Tampa ===
As the NBA's plans for the 2020–21 season began to take shape, the Toronto Raptors were denied permission to play home games in Toronto as the Canadian federal government ruled that repeated cross-border trips by the Raptors and their opponents would be a major health risk due to the different levels of COVID-19 cases in the United States and Canada. This is similar to what happened to the Raptors' Major League Baseball counterpart, the Toronto Blue Jays, who were forced to play their 2020 home games in Buffalo and would later play their 2021 home games at their spring training home of Dunedin, Florida.

After looking at several U.S. cities, the Raptors announced on November 20, 2020, that they would play their home games at Amalie Arena in Tampa, Florida during the 2020–21 season. This marked the first time since the then-named New Orleans Hornets in 2007 that an NBA team was temporarily displaced from their home city. The team, dealing with the aftermath of Hurricane Katrina in 2005, had played in Oklahoma City for the 2005–06 and 2006–07 seasons as the New Orleans/Oklahoma City Hornets.

=== COVID-19 restrictions ===
By July 21, 2021, all teams except the Oklahoma City Thunder allowed spectators to attend home games. Only seven teams had played all of their games with spectators since the start of the season.

Team	Home games with spectators allowed	Limitations	Source
Atlanta	Some	First five home games played for family and friends only. Capped at 8% capacity (roughly 1,300 spectators) beginning January 26, then to 20% (3,000 spectators) beginning March 13, and finally to roughly 46% (7,625 spectators) during the playoffs.	
Boston	Some	Capped at 12% capacity (2,142 fans) beginning March 20, then raised to 25% capacity (4,656 fans) beginning May 10.	
Brooklyn	Some	Capped at 10% beginning February 23. Negative COVID-19 PCR test within past 72 hours or vaccination completed no fewer than 14 days prior to the game required to enter.	
Charlotte	Some	Capped at 15% capacity (roughly 3,000 spectators) beginning March 13, then raised to 60% (roughly 12,000 fans) during the playoffs.	
Chicago	Some	Capped at 25% capacity (roughly 5,200 spectators) beginning May 7.	
Cleveland	All	Capped at 10% capacity (roughly 2,000 spectators). On February 4, 2021, the state of Ohio approved an increase to 14%.	
Dallas	Some	Capped at 7% capacity (roughly 1,500 spectators) beginning February 8.	
Denver	Some	Attendance on March 30 was reserved for frontline staff, health care providers and first responders; otherwise, 22% capacity (roughly 4,050 spectators) beginning April 4.	
Detroit	Some	Capped at 750 spectators beginning March 17.	
Golden State	Some	Capped at either 10% or 35% capacity beginning April 15, dependent on whether the team will mandate full vaccination or a recent negative test as a condition of entry. On April 2, the Warriors issued a statement acknowledging announcements by the state of California regarding indoor venues, but did not announce details on when they would begin to admit spectators (due to their schedule, the soonest they would be able to do so is April 23)	
Houston	All	Capped at 4,500	
Indiana	All	Capped at 1,000	
L.A. Clippers	Some	On April 2, the Clippers and Lakers announced that they intend to have spectators for their April 18 home game. Capped at either 10% or 35% capacity, dependent on whether the team will mandate full vaccination or a recent negative test as a condition of entry.	
L.A. Lakers	Some	On April 2, the Clippers and Lakers announced that they intend to have spectators for their April 18 home game. Capped at either 10% or 35% capacity, dependent on whether the team will mandate full vaccination or a recent negative test as a condition of entry.	
Memphis	Some	Limited courtside. Capacity raised to 11% (roughly 2,000 spectators) beginning February 4, then to 20% (roughly 3,600 spectators) beginning March 10.	
Miami	All	Initially capped at 2,000. In February 2021, capacity was increased to 3,000 for the final four home games before the All-Star break, and later to 4,000. In March 2021, the team announced plans to open seats closer to the court with less physical distancing for spectators who are fully-vaccinated. On April 8, the program became illegal after Governor Ron DeSantis signed an executive order prohibiting businesses from requesting proof of vaccination as a condition of service, and was therefore discontinued.	
Milwaukee	Some	Began to admit spectators in mid-February in a phased process, scaling up to 10% capacity (1,800). Spectators in proximity to the court must test negative on a rapid COVID-19 test. Capacity raised to roughly 19% (3,300 spectators) in the second half of the season, then to 50% (roughly 9,000 spectators) during the playoffs.	
Minnesota	Some	Capped at an unknown capacity (presumed to be 3,000 spectators) beginning April 5.	
New Orleans	All	Capped at 750 spectators. Capacity increased to 16% (2,700 spectators) beginning February 24, then to roughly 22% (3,700 spectators) beginning March 11.	
New York	Some	Capped at 10% (roughly 2,000 spectators) beginning February 23. Negative COVID-19 PCR test within past 72 hours or vaccination completed no fewer than 14 days prior to the game required to enter.	
Orlando	All	Capped at 4,000 spectators.	
Philadelphia	Some	Capped at roughly 15% (3,100 spectators) beginning March 14, then raised to 50% (roughly 10,200 spectators) during the playoffs.	
Phoenix	Some	Capped at 1,500 spectators beginning February 7 (with the first game offering an allotment of free tickets for healthcare workers). On February 10, the Suns announced that they would expand their capacity to 3,000 beginning February 16.	
Portland	Some	Capped at 10% capacity (roughly 1,900 spectators) beginning May 7.	
Sacramento	Some	Would be allowed to operate capped at 20% capacity beginning April 15, with all attendees required to provide proof of a recent negative test or that they are fully vaccinated. On April 2, the Kings issued a statement acknowledging announcements by the state of California regarding indoor venues, but did not announce details on when they would begin to admit spectators (due to their schedule, the soonest they would be able to do so is April 20)	
San Antonio	Some	The Spurs announced plans to begin hosting spectators on January 1, but announced on December 28, 2020, that this would be delayed indefinitely due to rising COVID-19 cases in the local market. In February 2021, the team began to place staff members in the crowd to test protocols, and announced on March 1 that it would begin hosting spectators beginning with its March 12 home game, capped at 3,200 spectators.	
Toronto	Some	Played their first few home games in Tampa Bay capped at 20% capacity. On January 9, 2021, Amalie Arena operator Vinik Sports Group announced that both the Raptors and the NHL's Tampa Bay Lightning will play behind closed doors until at least February 5, due to rising COVID-19 cases and hospitalizations in the local market. On March 4, 2021, Vinik Sports Group announced that it will reopen the arena, capped at 3,800 spectators, beginning March 13.	
Utah	All	In November 2020, the team announced that it planned to admit 1,500 spectators. In February 2021, the team announced that it would raise its capacity to 3,902 by allowing spectators in the upper bowl. Capacity was raised to roughly 30% (5,600 spectators), beginning March 12, then to roughly 36% (6,700 spectators) beginning May 1, and finally to roughly 71% (13,000 spectators) during the playoffs.	
Washington	Some	Capped at 10% capacity (2,100 spectators) beginning April 21.	

On February 10, 2021, Governor of New York Andrew Cuomo announced that the state would allow large sports venues to host spectators at 10% of their capacity beginning February 23, 2021, affecting the Brooklyn Nets and the New York Knicks. All spectators must present proof of a negative COVID-19 PCR test within 72 hours of the event, and may also be required to submit to a rapid test if their PCR test was within more than 48 hours of the event. In late March, Barclays Center and Madison Square Garden announced that the testing requirement would be waived for spectators who are fully vaccinated (second dose received no fewer than 14 days prior to the event).

On April 2, Governor of California Gavin Newsom announced that the state will begin allowing indoor event and sports venues to resume operations on April 15. In regions under the "Substantial" (red) tier, capacity is capped at 20%, and all attendees are required to provide proof of a recent negative test or that they are fully vaccinated. In the "Moderate" (orange) tier, capacity is capped at 10%, but can be raised to 35% if all attendees are required to provide proof of a recent negative test, or that they are fully vaccinated.

== Media ==
This was the fifth year of a nine-year deal with ABC, ESPN, TNT and NBA TV.

To reduce on-site staff, ESPN and TNT leverage the home team's rightsholder as a host broadcaster for some of their games. They send a neutral "world feed" and other camera feeds to the network, which then added commentary and surrounding coverage. ESPN and TNT are also deploying additional cameras specific to their broadcasts, and ESPN may provide a supplemental on-site presence if the local broadcaster does not have enough capacity to support the host model. ESPN stated that some (roughly half) of their games, particularly marquee games exclusive to ESPN and ABC, would be produced on-site with an existing hybrid model (where some producers and graphics operators work from ESPN's studios in Bristol, Connecticut). TNT also planned to begin doing some games on-site beginning with Martin Luther King Jr. Day.

On December 26, 2020, it was announced that Fox Sports Networks had acquired rights to simulcast 36 Toronto Raptors games locally in the Tampa Bay area through at least the first half of the season. All of the games were carried via the Fox Sports Go app, with selected games to also air on television via Fox Sports Sun (15) and Fox Sports Florida (2).

On March 31, 2021, the Fox Sports Networks rebranded as Bally Sports, as part of an agreement between majority-owner Sinclair Broadcast Group and casino operator Bally's Corporation.

== Notable occurrences ==
- On May 13, 2020, the NBA announced that Spalding's partnership with the league as official game ball supplier would end after this season. The league signed an agreement with Wilson for the latter to return as the NBA's official ball brand that would take effect in the 2021–22 season. Spalding was the official supplier of game balls since the start of the 1983–84 season.
- On December 26, 2020, Russell Westbrook of the Washington Wizards became the fourth player to record triple-doubles in the first two games of a season. On December 29, he became the second player after Oscar Robertson to record triple-doubles in their first three games of a season.
- On December 27, 2020, the Dallas Mavericks recorded the largest-ever halftime lead in a game, with a 50-point advantage over the Los Angeles Clippers (77–27).
- On December 27, 2020, Stephen Curry of the Golden State Warriors became the third player ever to reach 2,500 career 3-pointers.
- On December 29, 2020, the Milwaukee Bucks set a new record for most three-point field goals made in a game with 29 against the Miami Heat, breaking the previous record of 27 set by the Houston Rockets on April 7, 2019.
- On December 30, 2020, LeBron James of the Los Angeles Lakers became the first player to reach 1,000 consecutive regular season games with at least 10 points.
- On January 1, 2021, Carmelo Anthony of the Portland Trail Blazers passed Tim Duncan for 14th on the NBA all-time scoring list.
- On January 6, 2021, the Milwaukee Bucks and Detroit Pistons took a knee for their first possessions in protest to the announcement that criminal charges would not be filed against police officers in the Jacob Blake shooting. The Bucks held the ball for seven seconds in reference to Blake's seven gunshots. Various teams linked arms at center court in unison during the anthem in response to the 2021 storming of the United States Capitol.
- On January 7, 2021, Duncan Robinson of the Miami Heat became the fastest player to reach 300 career three-pointers. He made it in a span of only 95 games, surpassing both Luka Dončić's and Damian Lillard's previous record within 117 games.
- On January 8, 2021, the Toronto Raptors set a new franchise record for points in a single regular season game, scoring 144 points against the Sacramento Kings on the road.
- On January 9, 2021, LaMelo Ball posted a triple-double for the Charlotte Hornets against the Atlanta Hawks, becoming the youngest player ever to record a triple-double, at the age of 19 years and 140 days. He surpassed the previous record held by Markelle Fultz, who recorded a triple-double aged 19 years and 317 days.
- On January 16, 2021, James Harden of the Brooklyn Nets posted a triple-double against the Orlando Magic, becoming the seventh player to record a triple-double during his team debut.
- On January 20, 2021, Clint Capela of the Atlanta Hawks became the first player since Shaquille O'Neal in 2004 to record 25 points, 25 rebounds and 5 blocks in a single game, doing so against the Detroit Pistons.
- On January 20, 2021, Donovan Mitchell of the Utah Jazz became the fastest player to reach 600 three-pointers. He did it in just 240 games, beating the previous record of 244 games set by Buddy Hield in 2019.
- On January 23, 2021, Stephen Curry of the Golden State Warriors passed Reggie Miller for second place on the NBA all-time three-point list.
- On January 29, 2021, Russell Westbrook of the Washington Wizards passed Maurice Cheeks for 13th place on the NBA all-time assist list.
- On January 29, 2021, Trae Young of the Atlanta Hawks became the fastest player to reach 400 career three-pointers doing it in 159 games, surpassing the previous total of 163 games set by Damian Lillard.
- On February 2, 2021, Carmelo Anthony of the Portland Trail Blazers passed Dominique Wilkins for 13th on the NBA all-time scoring list.
- On February 4, 2021, LeBron James of the Los Angeles Lakers passed Wilt Chamberlain for third place on the NBA all-time field goal list.
- On February 6, 2021, Nikola Jokić of the Denver Nuggets became the first center since Kareem Abdul-Jabbar in 1975 to record 50 points and 10 assists.
- On February 9, 2021, Carmelo Anthony of the Portland Trail Blazers passed Oscar Robertson for 12th on the NBA all-time scoring list.
- On February 19, 2021, LeBron James of the Los Angeles Lakers became the third player in NBA history to reach 35,000 career points joining Kareem Abdul-Jabbar and Karl Malone.
- On February 19, 2021, Jimmy Butler and Bam Adebayo of the Miami Heat, in a game against the Sacramento Kings, became the first pair of teammates to each record a triple-double on multiple occasions. The duo first accomplished this feat on December 10, 2019, in a game against the Atlanta Hawks.
- On February 19, 2021, Jamal Murray had the most points (50) without a free throw attempted.
- On February 20, 2021, Chris Paul of the Phoenix Suns passed Oscar Robertson for sixth place on the NBA all-time assist list.
- On February 23, 2021, the Denver Nuggets broke the record for fewest turnovers (1) by a team in a game.
- On March 3, 2021, T. J. McConnell of the Indiana Pacers set several records. The first record was most steals in a half with 9. He also became the first player since Mookie Blaylock to record a triple-double with steals and the sixth player overall. He did this all off the bench which is also an NBA record.
- On March 3, 2021, Mason Plumlee and Dennis Smith Jr. of the Detroit Pistons became the 13th time a pair of teammates each had a triple-double in a game.
- On March 11, 2021, Duncan Robinson of the Miami Heat became the fastest player to record 400 made career three-pointers, doing it in a span of 125 games, surpassing previous record set by Trae Young at 159 games earlier on January 29, 2021. Robinson made this feat by scoring only nine points, all in three-pointers in a game won against the Orlando Magic. Currently, Robinson holds the record of being the fastest player ever to reach three three-pointers-made milestones—200 in 69 games, 300 in 95 games, and now 400 in 125 games.
- On March 13, 2021, Carmelo Anthony of the Portland Trail Blazers passed Hakeem Olajuwon for 11th place on the NBA all-time scoring list.
- On March 27, 2021, Gregg Popovich of the San Antonio Spurs became the third coach in NBA history to reach 1,300 career wins with a 120–104 win against the Chicago Bulls.
- On March 29, 2021, Russell Westbrook of the Washington Wizards became the third player to record a 30–10–20 triple-double, joining Oscar Robertson and Magic Johnson. He also became the first player to record a triple-double with 35 points and 20 assists, with his 35 points, 21 assists and 14 rebounds.
- On April 3, 2021, the Utah Jazz had the most three-point field goals made (18) by a team in a half.
- On April 10, 2021, the Oklahoma City Thunder had the youngest starting lineup in NBA history with an average age of 20 years, 8 months and 6 days.
- On April 12, 2021, Stephen Curry passed Wilt Chamberlain as the Golden State Warriors' all-time scoring leader.
- On April 30, the Boston Celtics overcame a 32-point deficit and beat the San Antonio Spurs, which was the third-biggest comeback ever. They were led by Jayson Tatum who had 60 points.
- On May 1, 2021, the Indiana Pacers defeated the Oklahoma City Thunder 152–95. The 57-point victory is the largest road win in NBA history.
- On May 1, 2021, Duncan Robinson of the Miami Heat passed Luka Dončić as the fastest player to reach 500 three-pointers. He made this feat in 152 games, in a 124–107 victory over the Cleveland Cavaliers, 35 games earlier than Dončić's record of within 187 games.
- On May 3, 2021, Carmelo Anthony of the Portland Trail Blazers passed Elvin Hayes for 10th place on the NBA all-time scoring list.
- On May 3, 2021, Russell Westbrook of the Washington Wizards clinched a fourth season averaging a triple-double. He also recorded the third-ever 20-rebound, 20-assist game, as well as the third-ever 10–20–20 game, with 14 points, 21 rebounds and 24 assists against the Indiana Pacers. This was his second time reaching each feat. He also tied the record for most assists (24) in a triple-double.
- On May 8, 2021, Russell Westbrook of the Washington Wizards tied Oscar Robertson for most career triple-doubles, with a career total of 181. Two days later on May 10, Westbrook passed Robertson, with a career total of 182.
- On June 1, 2021, Damian Lillard of the Portland Trail Blazers broke an NBA playoff record with 12 made three-pointers, including 2 threes to force overtime and double-overtime as part of a 55-point performance during a 147–140 loss to the Denver Nuggets in game 5 of the first round.
- On June 8, 2021, Nikola Jokić became the first Denver Nuggets player, the first Serbian native, and the lowest-drafted player to be named NBA MVP; he is the first center since Shaquille O'Neal in 2000 to win NBA MVP. Jokić and his fellow Serbian countryman Vasilije Micić (Anadolu Efes, Turkey) became the first-ever pair of players from the same country to be awarded both NBA MVP and EuroLeague MVP honors in the same season.
- Mitchell Robinson set the record for the highest two-point field goal percentage in a season at 74.19%.
- Utah Jazz set the record for the most three-point field goals made per game (16.7) in a season.
- Los Angeles Clippers set the record for the highest free-throw percentage averaged (83.9%) in a season.
- Portland Trail Blazers set the record for the lowest average turnovers per game (11.1) in a season.

== See also ==
- COVID-19 pandemic in Canada
- COVID-19 pandemic in the United States
- Impact of the COVID-19 pandemic on sports
- List of NBA regular season records
