= 2020–21 Milwaukee Bucks season =

Basketball team season (won NBA championship)

- NBA champions
- Conference champions
- Division champions
- Head coach: Mike Budenholzer
- General manager: Jon Horst
- Owners: Wesley Edens; Marc Lasry
- Arena: Fiserv Forum

Results
- Record: 46–26 (.639)
- Place: Division: 1st (Central); Conference: 3rd (Eastern)
- Playoff finish: NBA champions (defeated Suns 4–2)
- Stats at Basketball Reference

Local media
- Television: Bally Sports Wisconsin (Note: Formerly Fox Sports Wisconsin until March 31, 2021.)
- Radio: WTMJ

The 2020–21 Milwaukee Bucks season was the 53rd season of the franchise in the National Basketball Association (NBA). On April 30, 2021, the Bucks clinched the Central Division for a record 10th time with a win over the Chicago Bulls. The Bucks finished the season with a 46–26 record (equal to 52 wins in an 82-game season), good enough for the third seed. The Bucks began their playoff run by sweeping the sixth-seeded Miami Heat in the opening round, in a rematch of the Eastern Conference Semi-finals the previous year. The Bucks then defeated the second-seeded Brooklyn Nets in the Eastern Conference Semi-finals in seven games after beginning the series in a 0–2 deficit, and barely winning the third game of the series 86 to 83. In the Eastern Conference Finals, the Bucks defeated the Atlanta Hawks in six games, reaching the NBA Finals for the first time in 47 years, and winning the Eastern Conference Finals for the first time in franchise history. The Bucks are the first NBA team to have won both a Western Conference and Eastern Conference championship in their history, as they were in the Western Conference when they reached the NBA Finals in 1971 and 1974. The Bucks would face the Phoenix Suns in the NBA Finals. Despite losing the first two games, the Bucks won four straight, winning 4–2 and clinching their second NBA title, the first since 1971.

== Draft picks ==
Round	Pick	Player	Position(s)	Nationality	School
1	24	R. J. Hampton	PG/SG	United States	New Zealand Breakers
2	45	Jordan Nwora	SF	Nigeria	Louisville

== Roster ==
2020–21 Milwaukee Bucks roster
Players

Pos.	No.	Player	Height	Weight	DOB	From
F	34	Giannis Antetokounmpo (C)	7 ft 0 in (2.13 m)	242 lb (110 kg)	1994-12-06	Greece
F	43	Thanasis Antetokounmpo	6 ft 7 in (2.01 m)	219 lb (99 kg)	1992-07-18	Greece
G	3	Elijah Bryant	6 ft 5 in (1.96 m)	210 lb (95 kg)	1995-04-19	BYU
G	24	Pat Connaughton	6 ft 5 in (1.96 m)	209 lb (95 kg)	1993-01-06	Notre Dame
F/C	25	Mamadi Diakite	6 ft 9 in (2.06 m)	228 lb (103 kg)	1997-01-21	Virginia
G	0	Donte DiVincenzo	6 ft 4 in (1.93 m)	203 lb (92 kg)	1997-01-31	Villanova
G	7	Bryn Forbes	6 ft 2 in (1.88 m)	205 lb (93 kg)	1993-07-23	Michigan State
G	21	Jrue Holiday	6 ft 3 in (1.91 m)	205 lb (93 kg)	1990-06-12	UCLA
F	44	Justin Jackson (TW)	6 ft 8 in (2.03 m)	220 lb (100 kg)	1995-03-28	North Carolina
C	11	Brook Lopez	7 ft 1 in (2.16 m)	282 lb (128 kg)	1988-04-01	Stanford
G	15	Sam Merrill	6 ft 4 in (1.93 m)	205 lb (93 kg)	1996-05-15	Utah State
F	22	Khris Middleton (C)	6 ft 7 in (2.01 m)	222 lb (101 kg)	1991-08-12	Texas A&M
F	13	Jordan Nwora	6 ft 9 in (2.06 m)	225 lb (102 kg)	1998-09-09	Louisville
F/C	9	Bobby Portis	6 ft 11 in (2.11 m)	250 lb (113 kg)	1995-02-10	Arkansas
G	5	Jeff Teague	6 ft 3 in (1.91 m)	195 lb (88 kg)	1988-06-10	Wake Forest
G/F	66	Axel Toupane (TW)	6 ft 7 in (2.01 m)	210 lb (95 kg)	1992-07-23	France
F	17	P. J. Tucker	6 ft 5 in (1.96 m)	245 lb (111 kg)	1985-05-05	Texas

Coaches
Head coach
- Mike Budenholzer
Assistant(s)
- Vin Baker
- Mike Dunlap
- Chad Forcier
- Darvin Ham
- Charles Lee
- Josh Oppenheimer
- Patrick St. Andrews
- Ben Sullivan

Legend
- (DP) Unsigned draft pick
- (FA) Free agent
- (S) Suspended
- (GL) On assignment to G League affiliate
- (TW) Two-way affiliate player
- Injured

Roster
Updated: May 13, 2021

== Standings ==
=== Division ===
Central Division	W	L	PCT	GB	Home	Road	Div	GP
y – Milwaukee Bucks	46	26	.639	–	26‍–‍10	20‍–‍16	11–1	72
pi – Indiana Pacers	34	38	.472	12.0	13‍–‍23	21‍–‍15	7–5	72
Chicago Bulls	31	41	.431	15.0	15‍–‍21	16‍–‍20	7–5	72
Cleveland Cavaliers	22	50	.306	24.0	13‍–‍23	9‍–‍27	4–8	72
Detroit Pistons	20	52	.278	26.0	13‍–‍23	7‍–‍29	1–11	72

=== Conference ===
Eastern Conference
#	Team	W	L	PCT	GB	GP
1	c − Philadelphia 76ers *	49	23	.681	–	72
2	x – Brooklyn Nets	48	24	.667	1.0	72
3	y – Milwaukee Bucks *	46	26	.639	3.0	72
4	x – New York Knicks	41	31	.569	8.0	72
5	y – Atlanta Hawks *	41	31	.569	8.0	72
6	x – Miami Heat	40	32	.556	9.0	72
7	x – Boston Celtics	36	36	.500	13.0	72
8	x – Washington Wizards	34	38	.472	15.0	72
9	pi – Indiana Pacers	34	38	.472	15.0	72
10	pi – Charlotte Hornets	33	39	.458	16.0	72
11	Chicago Bulls	31	41	.431	18.0	72
12	Toronto Raptors	27	45	.375	22.0	72
13	Cleveland Cavaliers	22	50	.306	27.0	72
14	Orlando Magic	21	51	.292	28.0	72
15	Detroit Pistons	20	52	.278	29.0	72

Notes

- z – Clinched home court advantage for the entire playoffs
- c – Clinched home court advantage for the conference playoffs
- y – Clinched division title
- x – Clinched playoff spot

== Game log ==
=== Preseason ===
2020 preseason game log
Total: 0–3 (Home: 0–2; Road: 0–1)
Preseason: 0–3 (home: 0–2; road: 0–1)

Game	Date	Team	Score	High points	High rebounds	High assists	Location Attendance	Record
1	December 12	Dallas	L 102–112	Giannis Antetokounmpo (25)	Bobby Portis (12)	Bobby Portis (13)	Fiserv Forum	0–1
2	December 14	Dallas	L 112–128	Giannis Antetokounmpo (24)	Giannis Antetokounmpo (14)	Augustin, Holiday (6)	Fiserv Forum	0–2
3	December 18	@ New Orleans	L 113–127	Khris Middleton (29)	Donte DiVincenzo (8)	Jrue Holiday (5)	Smoothie King Center	0–3

2020–21 season schedule

=== Regular season ===
2020–21 game log
Total: 46–26 (Home: 26–10; Road: 20–16)
December: 2–3 (home: 1–0; road: 1–3)

Game	Date	Team	Score	High points	High rebounds	High assists	Location Attendance	Record
1	December 23	@ Boston	L 121–122	Giannis Antetokounmpo (35)	Khris Middleton (14)	Khris Middleton (8)	TD Garden; 0	0–1
2	December 25	Golden State	W 138–99	Khris Middleton (31)	Giannis Antetokounmpo (13)	Jrue Holiday (6)	Fiserv Forum; 0	1–1
3	December 27	@ New York	L 110–130	Giannis Antetokounmpo (27)	Giannis Antetokounmpo (13)	Antetokounmpo, Holiday, Middleton (5)	Madison Square Garden; 0	1–2
4	December 29	@ Miami	W 144–97	Khris Middleton (25)	Bobby Portis (9)	Jrue Holiday (7)	American Airlines Arena; 0	2–2
5	December 30	@ Miami	L 108–119	Giannis Antetokounmpo (26)	Giannis Antetokounmpo (13)	Giannis Antetokounmpo (10)	American Airlines Arena; 0	2–3

January: 9–5 (home: 6–2; road: 3–3)

Game	Date	Team	Score	High points	High rebounds	High assists	Location Attendance	Record
6	January 1	Chicago	W 126–96	Giannis Antetokounmpo (29)	Antetokounmpo, Portis (12)	Giannis Antetokounmpo (8)	Fiserv Forum; 0	3–3
7	January 4	Detroit	W 125–115	Giannis Antetokounmpo (43)	Antetokounmpo, Middleton (9)	Donte DiVincenzo (9)	Fiserv Forum; 0	4–3
8	January 6	Detroit	W 130–115	Giannis Antetokounmpo (25)	Bobby Portis (10)	Khris Middleton (7)	Fiserv Forum; 0	5–3
9	January 8	Utah	L 118–131	Giannis Antetokounmpo (35)	Khris Middleton (10)	Bobby Portis (8)	Fiserv Forum; 0	5–4
10	January 9	Cleveland	W 100–90	Khris Middleton (27)	Bobby Portis (11)	Khris Middleton (6)	Fiserv Forum; 0	6–4
11	January 11	@ Orlando	W 121–99	Giannis Antetokounmpo (22)	Khris Middleton (10)	Antetokounmpo, Augustin (4)	Amway Center; 0	7–4
12	January 13	@ Detroit	W 110–101	Giannis Antetokounmpo (22)	Brook Lopez (11)	Giannis Antetokounmpo (10)	Little Caesars Arena; 0	8–4
13	January 15	Dallas	W 112–109	Giannis Antetokounmpo (31)	Bobby Portis (13)	Khris Middleton (6)	Fiserv Forum; 0	9–4
14	January 18	@ Brooklyn	L 123–125	Giannis Antetokounmpo (34)	Giannis Antetokounmpo (12)	Giannis Antetokounmpo (7)	Barclays Center; 0	9–5
15	January 21	L. A. Lakers	L 106–113	Giannis Antetokounmpo (25)	Giannis Antetokounmpo (12)	Holiday, Middleton (7)	Fiserv Forum; 0	9–6
–	January 22	Washington	Postponed (COVID-19) (Makeup date: May 5)					
16	January 24	Atlanta	W 129–115	Giannis Antetokounmpo (27)	Giannis Antetokounmpo (14)	Giannis Antetokounmpo (8)	Fiserv Forum; 0	10–6
17	January 27	@ Toronto	W 115–108	Antetokounmpo, Middleton (24)	Giannis Antetokounmpo (18)	Giannis Antetokounmpo (9)	Amalie Arena; 0	11–6
18	January 29	@ New Orleans	L 126–131	Giannis Antetokounmpo (38)	Giannis Antetokounmpo (11)	Khris Middleton (8)	Smoothie King Center; 0	11–7
19	January 30	@ Charlotte	L 114–126	Giannis Antetokounmpo (34)	Giannis Antetokounmpo (18)	Giannis Antetokounmpo (9)	Spectrum Center; 0	11–8

February: 10–5 (home: 7–2; road: 3–3)

Game	Date	Team	Score	High points	High rebounds	High assists	Location Attendance	Record
20	February 1	Portland	W 134–106	Jrue Holiday (22)	Bobby Portis (8)	Khris Middleton (9)	Fiserv Forum; 0	12–8
21	February 3	Indiana	W 130–110	Giannis Antetokounmpo (21)	Giannis Antetokounmpo (14)	Giannis Antetokounmpo (10)	Fiserv Forum; 0	13–8
22	February 5	@ Cleveland	W 123–105	Giannis Antetokounmpo (33)	Giannis Antetokounmpo (12)	Jrue Holiday (7)	Rocket Mortgage FieldHouse; 0	14–8
23	February 6	@ Cleveland	W 124–99	Giannis Antetokounmpo (24)	Giannis Antetokounmpo (11)	Giannis Antetokounmpo (11)	Rocket Mortgage FieldHouse; 0	15–8
24	February 8	@ Denver	W 125–112	Giannis Antetokounmpo (30)	Giannis Antetokounmpo (9)	Khris Middleton (12)	Ball Arena; 0	16–8
25	February 10	@ Phoenix	L 124–125	Giannis Antetokounmpo (47)	Giannis Antetokounmpo (11)	Khris Middleton (11)	Phoenix Suns Arena; 0	16–9
26	February 12	@ Utah	L 115–129	Giannis Antetokounmpo (29)	Giannis Antetokounmpo (15)	Giannis Antetokounmpo (6)	Vivint Smart Home Arena; 3,902	16–10
27	February 14	@ Oklahoma City	L 109–114	Giannis Antetokounmpo (24)	Giannis Antetokounmpo (17)	Giannis Antetokounmpo (10)	Chesapeake Energy Arena; 0	16–11
28	February 16	Toronto	L 113–124	Giannis Antetokounmpo (34)	Giannis Antetokounmpo (10)	Antetokounmpo, DiVincenzo (8)	Fiserv Forum; 250	16–12
29	February 18	Toronto	L 96–110	Giannis Antetokounmpo (23)	Giannis Antetokounmpo (12)	Giannis Antetokounmpo (8)	Fiserv Forum; 500	16–13
30	February 19	Oklahoma City	W 98–85	Giannis Antetokounmpo (29)	Giannis Antetokounmpo (19)	Giannis Antetokounmpo (8)	Fiserv Forum; 750	17–13
31	February 21	Sacramento	W 128–115	Giannis Antetokounmpo (38)	Giannis Antetokounmpo (18)	Khris Middleton (6)	Fiserv Forum; 1,800	18–13
32	February 23	Minnesota	W 139–112	Giannis Antetokounmpo (37)	G. Antetokounmpo, T. Antetokounmpo (8)	Giannis Antetokounmpo (8)	Fiserv Forum; 1,800	19–13
33	February 25	New Orleans	W 129–125	Giannis Antetokounmpo (38)	Giannis Antetokounmpo (10)	Donte DiVincenzo (9)	Fiserv Forum; 1,800	20–13
34	February 28	L. A. Clippers	W 105–100	Giannis Antetokounmpo (36)	Giannis Antetokounmpo (14)	Khris Middleton (8)	Fiserv Forum; 1,800	21–13

March: 9–4 (home: 4–3; road: 5–1)

Game	Date	Team	Score	High points	High rebounds	High assists	Location Attendance	Record
35	March 2	Denver	L 97–128	Giannis Antetokounmpo (27)	Antetokounmpo, Connaughton (8)	Khris Middleton (6)	Fiserv Forum; 1,800	21–14
36	March 4	@ Memphis	W 112–111	Giannis Antetokounmpo (26)	Giannis Antetokounmpo (11)	Giannis Antetokounmpo (8)	FedExForum; 1,961	22–14
ASG	March 7	Team LeBron @ Team Durant	W 170–150	Giannis Antetokounmpo (35)	Chris Paul (8) Giannis Antetokounmpo (7)	Chris Paul (16) Giannis Antetokounmpo (3)	State Farm Arena; 0	1–0
37	March 11	New York	W 134–101	Giannis Antetokounmpo (24)	Giannis Antetokounmpo (10)	Giannis Antetokounmpo (10)	Fiserv Forum; 1,800	23–14
38	March 13	@ Washington	W 125–119	Giannis Antetokounmpo (33)	Donte DiVincenzo (13)	Giannis Antetokounmpo (11)	Capital One Arena; 0	24–14
39	March 15	@ Washington	W 133–122	Giannis Antetokounmpo (31)	Giannis Antetokounmpo (15)	Giannis Antetokounmpo (10)	Capital One Arena; 0	25–14
40	March 17	@ Philadelphia	W 109–105	Giannis Antetokounmpo (32)	Giannis Antetokounmpo (15)	Jrue Holiday (6)	Wells Fargo Center; 3,071	26–14
41	March 20	San Antonio	W 120–113	Giannis Antetokounmpo (26)	Donte DiVincenzo (13)	Giannis Antetokounmpo (15)	Fiserv Forum; 3,280	27–14
42	March 22	Indiana	W 140–113	Jrue Holiday (28)	Donte DiVincenzo (13)	Jrue Holiday (14)	Fiserv Forum; 3,280	28–14
43	March 24	Boston	W 121–119	Khris Middleton (27)	Khris Middleton (13)	Giannis Antetokounmpo (7)	Fiserv Forum; 3,280	29–14
44	March 26	Boston	L 114–122	Khris Middleton (19)	Pat Connaughton (11)	Giannis Antetokounmpo (5)	Fiserv Forum; 3,280	29–15
45	March 27	New York	L 96–102	Thanasis Antetokounmpo (23)	T. Antetokounmpo, Lopez, Nwora (10)	T. Antetokounmpo, Merrill (5)	Fiserv Forum; 3,280	29–16
46	March 29	@ L. A. Clippers	L 105–129	Giannis Antetokounmpo (32)	Pat Connaughton (7)	Jrue Holiday (7)	Staples Center; 0	29–17
47	March 31	@ L. A. Lakers	W 112–97	Jrue Holiday (28)	Giannis Antetokounmpo (10)	Khris Middleton (8)	Staples Center; 0	30–17

April: 9–7 (home: 2–3; road: 7–4)

Game	Date	Team	Score	High points	High rebounds	High assists	Location Attendance	Record
48	April 2	@ Portland	W 127–109	Giannis Antetokounmpo (47)	Giannis Antetokounmpo (12)	Jrue Holiday (10)	Moda Center; 0	31–17
49	April 3	@ Sacramento	W 129–128	Jrue Holiday (33)	Donte DiVincenzo (14)	Jrue Holiday (11)	Golden 1 Center; 0	32–17
50	April 6	@ Golden State	L 121–122	Jrue Holiday (29)	Bobby Portis (13)	Khris Middleton (7)	Chase Center; 0	32–18
51	April 8	@ Dallas	L 101–116	Donte DiVincenzo (22)	Bobby Portis (14)	Holiday, Middleton, Teague (3)	American Airlines Center; 4,190	32–19
52	April 9	Charlotte	L 119–127	Jordan Nwora (24)	Bobby Portis (13)	Jeff Teague (6)	Fiserv Forum; 3,280	32–20
53	April 11	@ Orlando	W 124–87	Khris Middleton (21)	Bobby Portis (10)	Jrue Holiday (7)	Amway Center; 3,316	33–20
54	April 14	@ Minnesota	W 130–105	Khris Middleton (27)	Lopez, Middleton (8)	Khris Middleton (7)	Target Center; 0	34–20
55	April 15	@ Atlanta	W 120–109	Jrue Holiday (23)	Brook Lopez (12)	Holiday, Middleton (7)	State Farm Arena; 0	35–20
56	April 17	Memphis	L 115–128	Giannis Antetokounmpo (28)	Giannis Antetokounmpo (11)	Khris Middleton (10)	Fiserv Forum; 3,280	35–21
57	April 19	Phoenix	L 127–128	Giannis Antetokounmpo (33)	Pat Connaughton (9)	Jrue Holiday (8)	Fiserv Forum; 3,280	35–22
58	April 22	Philadelphia	W 124–117	Giannis Antetokounmpo (27)	Giannis Antetokounmpo (16)	Jrue Holiday (11)	Fiserv Forum; 3,280	36–22
59	April 24	Philadelphia	W 132–94	Giannis Antetokounmpo (24)	Giannis Antetokounmpo (14)	Jeff Teague (8)	Fiserv Forum; 3,280	37–22
60	April 25	@ Atlanta	L 104–111	Giannis Antetokounmpo (31)	Giannis Antetokounmpo (14)	Jrue Holiday (11)	State Farm Arena; 3,010	37–23
61	April 27	@ Charlotte	W 114–104	Giannis Antetokounmpo (29)	Giannis Antetokounmpo (12)	Giannis Antetokounmpo (8)	Spectrum Center; 3,240	38–23
62	April 29	@ Houston	L 136–143	Khris Middleton (33)	Bobby Portis (11)	Jrue Holiday (10)	Toyota Center; 3,232	38–24
63	April 30	@ Chicago	W 108–98	Lopez, Middleton (22)	Bobby Portis (14)	Jrue Holiday (7)	United Center; 0	39–24

May: 7–2 (home: 6–0; road: 1–2)

Game	Date	Team	Score	High points	High rebounds	High assists	Location Attendance	Record
64	May 2	Brooklyn	W 117–114	Giannis Antetokounmpo (49)	Khris Middleton (11)	Khris Middleton (6)	Fiserv Forum; 3,280	40–24
65	May 4	Brooklyn	W 124–118	Giannis Antetokounmpo (36)	Donte DiVincenzo (15)	Jrue Holiday (10)	Fiserv Forum; 3,280	41–24
66	May 5	Washington	W 135–134	Jrue Holiday (29)	Giannis Antetokounmpo (9)	Giannis Antetokounmpo (8)	Fiserv Forum; 3,280	42–24
67	May 7	Houston	W 141–133	Brook Lopez (24)	Giannis Antetokounmpo (11)	Jrue Holiday (8)	Fiserv Forum; 3,280	43–24
68	May 10	@ San Antonio	L 125–146	Giannis Antetokounmpo (28)	Khris Middleton (7)	DiVincenzo, Holiday (6)	AT&T Center; 3,992	43–25
69	May 11	Orlando	W 114–102	Giannis Antetokounmpo (27)	Bobby Portis (15)	G. Antetokounmpo, Middleton (5)	Fiserv Forum; 3,280	44–25
70	May 13	@ Indiana	W 142–133	Giannis Antetokounmpo (40)	Giannis Antetokounmpo (15)	Jrue Holiday (14)	Bankers Life Fieldhouse; 0	45–25
71	May 15	Miami	W 122–108	Forbes, Middleton (21)	G. Antetokounmpo, DiVincenzo (9)	Jrue Holiday (10)	Fiserv Forum; 3,280	46–25
72	May 16	@ Chicago	L 112–118	Jordan Nwora (34)	Jordan Nwora (14)	Jeff Teague (7)	United Center; 3,427	46–26

2020–21 season schedule

=== Playoffs ===
2021 playoff game log
Total: 16–7 (Home: 10–1; Road: 6–6)
First round: 4–0 (home: 2–0; road: 2–0)

Game	Date	Team	Score	High points	High rebounds	High assists	Location Attendance	Series
1	May 22	Miami	W 109–107 (OT)	Khris Middleton (27)	Giannis Antetokounmpo (18)	Khris Middleton (6)	Fiserv Forum; 9,107	1–0
2	May 24	Miami	W 132–98	Giannis Antetokounmpo (31)	Giannis Antetokounmpo (13)	Jrue Holiday (15)	Fiserv Forum; 9,107	2–0
3	May 27	@ Miami	W 113–84	Khris Middleton (22)	Giannis Antetokounmpo (17)	Jrue Holiday (12)	American Airlines Arena; 17,000	3–0
4	May 29	@ Miami	W 120–103	Brook Lopez (25)	Giannis Antetokounmpo (12)	Giannis Antetokounmpo (15)	American Airlines Arena; 17,000	4–0

Conference Semifinals: 4–3 (home: 3–0; road: 1–3)

Game	Date	Team	Score	High points	High rebounds	High assists	Location Attendance	Series
1	June 5	@ Brooklyn	L 107–115	Giannis Antetokounmpo (34)	Khris Middleton (13)	Jrue Holiday (6)	Barclays Center; 15,750	0–1
2	June 7	@ Brooklyn	L 86–125	Giannis Antetokounmpo (18)	Giannis Antetokounmpo (11)	Giannis Antetokounmpo (4)	Barclays Center; 15,776	0–2
3	June 10	Brooklyn	W 86–83	Khris Middleton (35)	Khris Middleton (15)	Jrue Holiday (5)	Fiserv Forum; 16,310	1–2
4	June 13	Brooklyn	W 107–96	Giannis Antetokounmpo (34)	Giannis Antetokounmpo (12)	Jrue Holiday (9)	Fiserv Forum; 16,310	2–2
5	June 15	@ Brooklyn	L 108–114	Giannis Antetokounmpo (34)	Giannis Antetokounmpo (12)	Jrue Holiday (8)	Barclays Center; 16,067	2–3
6	June 17	Brooklyn	W 104–89	Khris Middleton (38)	Giannis Antetokounmpo (17)	Holiday, Middleton (5)	Fiserv Forum; 16,310	3–3
7	June 19	@ Brooklyn	W 115–111 (OT)	Giannis Antetokounmpo (40)	Giannis Antetokounmpo (13)	Jrue Holiday (8)	Barclays Center; 16,287	4–3

Conference Finals: 4–2 (home: 2–1; road: 2–1)

Game	Date	Team	Score	High points	High rebounds	High assists	Location Attendance	Series
1	June 23	Atlanta	L 113–116	Giannis Antetokounmpo (34)	Giannis Antetokounmpo (12)	Jrue Holiday (10)	Fiserv Forum; 16,310	0–1
2	June 25	Atlanta	W 125–91	Giannis Antetokounmpo (25)	Giannis Antetokounmpo (9)	Khris Middleton (8)	Fiserv Forum; 16,422	1–1
3	June 27	@ Atlanta	W 113–102	Khris Middleton (38)	Antetokounmpo, Middleton (11)	Jrue Holiday (12)	State Farm Arena; 16,650	2–1
4	June 29	@ Atlanta	L 88–110	Jrue Holiday (19)	Giannis Antetokounmpo (8)	Jrue Holiday (9)	State Farm Arena; 16,478	2–2
5	July 1	Atlanta	W 123–112	Brook Lopez (33)	Khris Middleton (13)	Jrue Holiday (13)	Fiserv Forum; 16,389	3–2
6	July 3	@ Atlanta	W 118–107	Khris Middleton (32)	Holiday, Portis (9)	Jrue Holiday (9)	State Farm Arena; 16,620	4–2

NBA Finals: 4–2 (home: 3–0; road: 1–2)

Game	Date	Team	Score	High points	High rebounds	High assists	Location Attendance	Series
1	July 6	@ Phoenix	L 105–118	Khris Middleton (29)	Giannis Antetokounmpo (17)	Jrue Holiday (9)	Phoenix Suns Arena; 16,557	0–1
2	July 8	@ Phoenix	L 108–118	Giannis Antetokounmpo (42)	Giannis Antetokounmpo (12)	Khris Middleton (8)	Phoenix Suns Arena; 16,583	0–2
3	July 11	Phoenix	W 120–100	Giannis Antetokounmpo (41)	Giannis Antetokounmpo (13)	Jrue Holiday (9)	Fiserv Forum; 16,637	1–2
4	July 14	Phoenix	W 109–103	Khris Middleton (40)	Giannis Antetokounmpo (14)	Giannis Antetokounmpo (8)	Fiserv Forum; 16,911	2–2
5	July 17	@ Phoenix	W 123–119	Giannis Antetokounmpo (32)	Giannis Antetokounmpo (9)	Jrue Holiday (13)	Footprint Center; 16,562	3–2
6	July 20	Phoenix	W 105–98	Giannis Antetokounmpo (50)	Giannis Antetokounmpo (14)	Jrue Holiday (11)	Fiserv Forum; 17,397	4–2

2021 playoff schedule

== Player statistics ==
Legend
GP	Games played	GS	Games started	MPG	Minutes per game
FG%	Field-goal percentage	3P%	3-point field-goal percentage	FT%	Free-throw percentage
RPG	Rebounds per game	APG	Assists per game	SPG	Steals per game
BPG	Blocks per game	PPG	Points per game

=== Regular season ===
Milwaukee Bucks statistics
Player	GP	GS	MPG	FG%	3P%	FT%	RPG	APG	SPG	BPG	PPG
Brook Lopez	70	70	27.2	.503	.338	.845	5.0	.7	.6	1.5	12.3
Bryn Forbes	70	10	19.3	.473	.452	.770	1.6	.6	.3	.0	10.0
Pat Connaughton	69	4	22.8	.434	.371	.775	4.8	1.2	.7	.3	6.8
Khris Middleton	68	68	33.4	.476	.414	.898	6.0	5.4	1.1	.1	20.4
Donte DiVincenzo	66	66	27.5	.420	.379	.718	5.8	3.1	1.1	.2	10.4
Bobby Portis	66	7	20.8	.523	.471	.740	7.1	1.1	.8	.4	11.4
Giannis Antetokounmpo	61	61	33.0	.569	.303	.685	11.0	5.9	1.2	1.2	28.1
Jrue Holiday	59	56	32.3	.503	.392	.787	4.5	6.1	1.6	.6	17.7
Thanasis Antetokounmpo	57	3	9.7	.489	.241	.510	2.2	.8	.4	.2	2.9
D. J. Augustin^{†}	37	6	19.3	.370	.380	.900	1.4	3.0	.5	.0	6.1
Jordan Nwora	30	2	9.1	.459	.452	.760	2.0	.2	.5	.2	5.7
Sam Merrill	30	2	7.8	.444	.447	1.000	1.0	.7	.3	.0	3.0
Jeff Teague^{†}	21	2	15.9	.469	.385	.864	1.5	2.8	.4	.2	6.6
P. J. Tucker^{†}	20	1	19.9	.391	.394	.600	2.8	.8	.5	.1	2.6
Torrey Craig^{†}	18	0	11.2	.391	.364	.500	2.4	.9	.5	.4	2.5
Mamadi Diakite	14	1	10.1	.400	.125	.786	2.4	.6	.5	.4	3.1
D. J. Wilson^{†}	12	0	8.8	.372	.357	.500	2.1	.3	.1	.3	3.6
Axel Toupane	8	1	7.6	.364	.500	.714	.8	.5	.3	.4	1.8
Jaylen Adams	7	0	2.6	.125	.000		.4	.3	.0	.0	.3
Rodions Kurucs^{†}	5	0	6.8	.625	.750	1.000	1.8	.8	.6	.0	3.0
Justin Jackson^{†}	1	0	33.0	.333	.333	.500	6.0	1.0	.0	.0	9.0
Elijah Bryant	1	0	32.0	.462	.200	1.000	6.0	3.0	.0	1.0	16.0

=== Playoffs ===
Milwaukee Bucks statistics
Player	GP	GS	MPG	FG%	3P%	FT%	RPG	APG	SPG	BPG	PPG
Khris Middleton	23	23	40.1	.438	.343	.887	7.6	5.1	1.5	.2	23.6
Jrue Holiday	23	23	39.7	.406	.303	.714	5.7	8.7	1.7	.4	17.3
Brook Lopez	23	23	29.0	.548	.319	.860	5.9	.3	.7	1.5	13.0
P. J. Tucker	23	19	29.6	.388	.322	.750	4.8	1.1	1.0	.1	4.3
Pat Connaughton	23	1	23.7	.462	.389	.846	4.4	.9	.4	.3	6.9
Giannis Antetokounmpo	21	21	38.1	.569	.186	.587	12.8	5.1	1.0	1.2	30.2
Bobby Portis	20	2	18.3	.464	.346	.720	5.0	.6	.7	.4	8.8
Bryn Forbes	20	0	13.7	.411	.371	.750	1.4	.3	.1	.1	6.6
Jeff Teague	16	0	7.4	.290	.455	.818	.5	.8	.2	.0	2.0
Thanasis Antetokounmpo	13	0	3.5	.286		.833	.8	.2	.4	.2	.7
Elijah Bryant	11	0	4.5	.350	.000		1.1	.4	.2	.1	1.3
Sam Merrill	8	0	3.8	.286	.200		.6	.1	.5	.0	.6
Mamadi Diakite	7	0	5.0	.200	.500	1.000	1.0	.0	.4	.1	1.0
Jordan Nwora	5	0	6.2	.222	.250	.714	1.8	.2	.0	.2	3.0
Justin Jackson	5	0	3.0	.600	.000		.4	.2	.2	.0	1.2
Axel Toupane	4	0	2.5	.500	.500		1.0	.0	.0	.0	1.3
Donte DiVincenzo	3	3	23.3	.188	.167		6.3	2.7	1.0	.3	2.7

- ^{†} Denotes player spent time with another team in the season. Stats reflect time with the Bucks only.

== Transactions ==
=== Trades ===
November 18, 2020	To Milwaukee Bucks 2020 ORL second-round pick (#45)	To Orlando Magic 2022 IND protected second-round pick 2026 MIL second-round pick
November 18, 2020	To Milwaukee Bucks rights to İlkan Karaman (2012 #57)	To Cleveland Cavaliers 2022 MIL first-round pick 2025 MIL second-round pick
November 24, 2020	To Milwaukee Bucks Jrue Holiday (from New Orleans); Draft rights to Sam Merrill (#60) (from New Orleans)	To Denver Nuggets Draft rights to R. J. Hampton (#24) (from Milwaukee)
November 24, 2020	To New Orleans Pelicans Steven Adams (from Oklahoma City); Eric Bledsoe (from Milwaukee); 2024 right to swap first-round pick with MIL (from Milwaukee); 2025 MIL first-round pick (from Milwaukee); 2026 right to swap first-round pick with MIL (from Milwaukee); 2027 MIL first-round pick (from Milwaukee)	To Oklahoma City Thunder George Hill (from Milwaukee); Zylan Cheatham (from New Orleans) (Sign and trade); Josh Gray (from New Orleans) (Sign and trade); Darius Miller (from New Orleans); Kenrich Williams (from New Orleans) (Sign and trade); 2023 DEN protected first-round pick (from Denver); 2023 WAS second-round pick (from New Orleans); 2024 CHA second-round pick (from New Orleans)

==== Failed Bogdan Bogdanović trade ====
In November 2020, the Bucks attempted to acquire Bogdan Bogdanović through a sign-and-trade deal along with Justin James from the Sacramento Kings for Donte DiVincenzo, D. J. Wilson, and Ersan İlyasova. The trade unraveled when the NBA announced they were investigating the Bucks for having contact with Bogdanović and/or his agent before it was allowed under free agency rules. The Bucks reportedly felt double-crossed by the situation, and decided not to pursue the trade further. The league voided the team's second-round pick in 2022 at the conclusion of the investigation in December. According to Bogdanović, he was not aware of the trade and felt betrayed by the Kings. DiVincenzo and Wilson stayed with the Bucks and İlyasova was eventually waived. Bogdanović would sign with the Atlanta Hawks as a restricted free agent, after the Kings extended his qualifying offer. Coincidentally, the Kings and Bucks would be able to make a successful trade during the following season, where the Kings successfully acquired DiVincenzo in a four-team trade.

=== Free agency ===
==== Re-signed ====
Player	Signed
Pat Connaughton	November 24

==== Additions ====
Player	Signed	Former Team
Jaylen Adams	November 24	Portland Trail Blazers
Mamadi Diakite	November 24	Virginia
Torrey Craig	November 26	Denver Nuggets
Bryn Forbes	November 26	San Antonio Spurs
Bobby Portis	November 26	New York Knicks
D. J. Augustin	November 28	Orlando Magic

==== Subtractions ====
Player	Left	New Team
Ersan İlyasova	November 19	Utah Jazz
Robin Lopez	November 22	Washington Wizards
Wesley Matthews	November 22	Los Angeles Lakers
Sterling Brown	November 26	Houston Rockets
