= Axel Toupane =

French basketball player (born 1992)

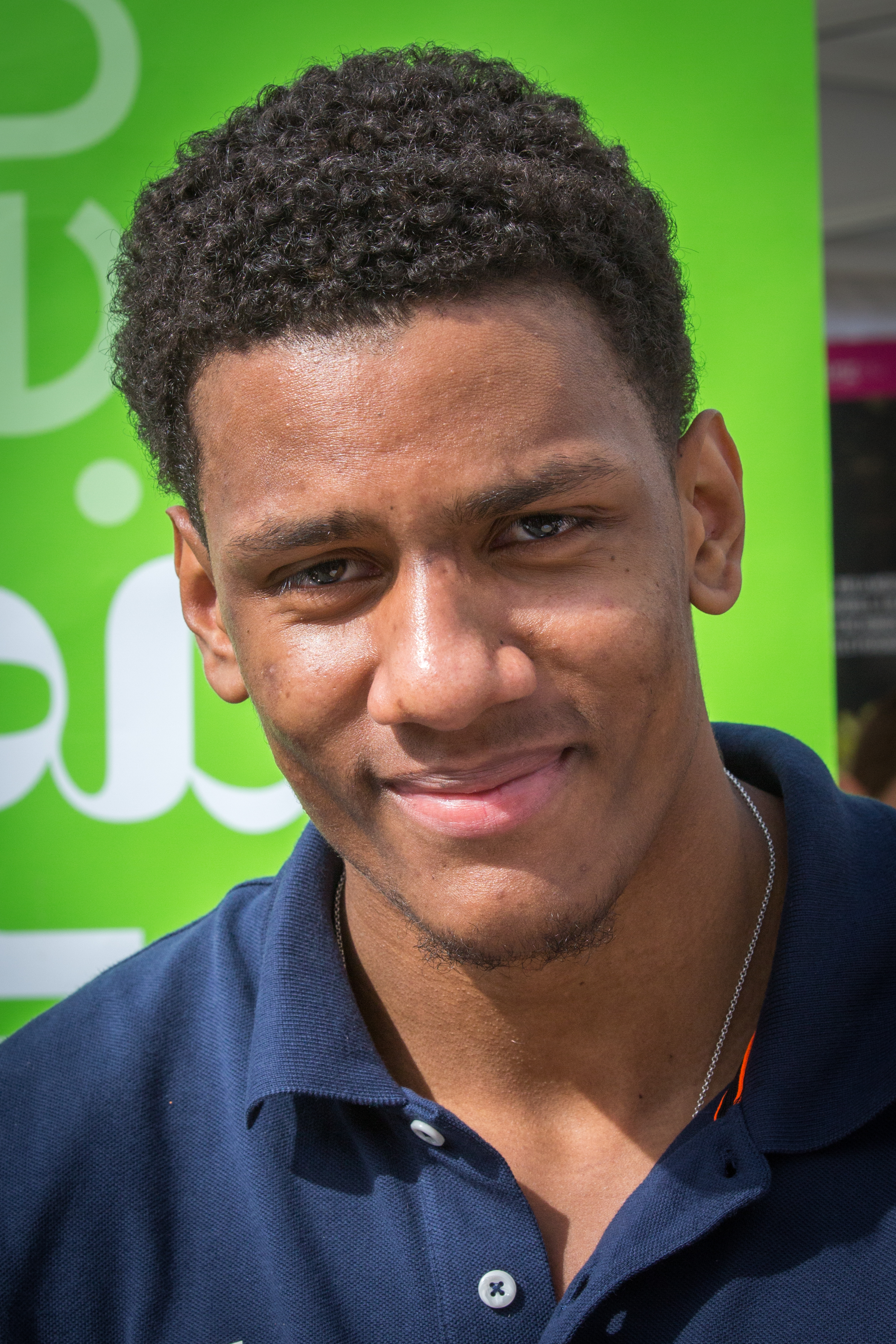

No. 33 – Saint-Quentin
- Position: Shooting guard / small forward
- League: LNB Élite

Personal information
- Born: July 23, 1992 (age 34) Mulhouse, France
- Listed height: 2.01 m (6 ft 7 in)
- Listed weight: 101 kg (223 lb)

Career information
- NBA draft: 2014: undrafted
- Playing career: 2011–present

Career history
- 2011–2015: SIG Strasbourg
- 2015–2016: Raptors 905
- 2016: Denver Nuggets
- 2016–2017: Raptors 905
- 2017: Milwaukee Bucks
- 2017: New Orleans Pelicans
- 2017–2018: Žalgiris
- 2018–2019: Olympiacos
- 2019–2020: Unicaja
- 2020: SIG Strasbourg
- 2021: Santa Cruz Warriors
- 2021: Milwaukee Bucks
- 2021: Santa Cruz Warriors
- 2022–2023: Paris Basketball
- 2023–2024: Metropolitans 92
- 2025: Homenetmen Beirut
- 2025: Taoyuan Taiwan Beer Leopards
- 2025–2026: FC Porto
- 2026: ASC Ville de Dakar
- 2026–present: Saint-Quentin

Career highlights
- NBA champion (2021); Portuguese League champion (2026); French Cup winner (2015); French Leaders Cup winner (2015); Lithuanian LKL champion (2018); Lithuanian King Mindaugas Cup winner (2018); NBA D-League champion (2017); All-NBA D-League Third Team (2017); NBA D-League Most Improved Player (2016)
- Stats at NBA.com
- Stats at Basketball Reference
Medals
Men's basketball
Representing France
FIBA World Cup
Bronze medal – third place	2019 China
U20 European Championship
Silver medal – second place	2012 Slovenia	Under-20
Bronze medal – third place	2011 Spain	Under-20

Axel Joseph Jean-Jacques Toupane (born July 23, 1992) is a French professional basketball player for Saint-Quentin of the LNB Élite. At 2.01 m (6 ft 7 in) tall and 101 kg (223 lb), he plays at the shooting guard and small forward positions. Toupane has represented the senior French national team in international events previously.

Axel Toupane is a graduate of Bocconi University, HEC Paris, and Emlyon Business School.

== Professional career ==
=== SIG Strasbourg (2011–2015) ===
From 2008 to 2011, Toupane spent time with the Élan Béarnais Pau-Orthez and SIG Strasbourg under-21 teams before joining the SIG Strasbourg senior squad for the 2011–12 LNB Pro A season. As a rookie, he averaged 2.5 points and 1.4 rebounds in 22 French Pro A League games. In the 2012–13 season, Toupane averaged 3.9 points and 1.9 rebounds per game in 35 games as he helped Strasbourg reach the French Leaders Cup Final. He was considerably more effective the following season, as he averaged 6.1 points and 2.5 rebounds per game, playing in 41 games.

Following the 2013–14 season, Toupane entered the 2014 NBA draft, but he was not selected. He then competed in the 2014 NBA Summer League for the Dallas Mavericks' affiliated team, for which he averaged 3.5 points and 2.0 rebounds per game over four games. He returned to Strasbourg following his play in the Summer League, and in the 2014–15 season, Toupane averaged 7.5 points, 2.5 rebounds and 1.4 assists per game in 42 Pro A games. Strasbourg finished as the regular-season leaders for a second straight year in 2015 and also won the French Cup and the French Leaders Cup.

=== Raptors 905 (2015–2016) ===
On July 23, 2015, Toupane signed with the Toronto Raptors after having averaged 4.3 points and 1.7 rebounds in three Summer League games for the team. On October 24, 2015, he was waived by the Raptors after appearing in two NBA preseason games.

On October 31, 2015, Toupane was acquired by the Raptors' affiliate team in the NBA Development League, the Raptors 905. On November 19, he made his debut for the Raptors 905 in a 109–104 loss to the Maine Red Claws, recording 17 points, 10 rebounds, four assists and one steal in 30 minutes of playing time.

=== Denver Nuggets (2016) ===
On March 3, 2016, Toupane signed a 10-day contract with the Denver Nuggets after having averaged 14.6 points, 5.6 rebounds, 3.6 assists and 1.0 steals over 32 games in the D-League. The next day, he made his NBA debut in a 121–120 loss to the Brooklyn Nets, recording one rebound in five minutes off the bench. He later signed a second 10-day contract with the Nuggets on March 14, and a multi-year contract on March 25. At the conclusion of the 2015–16 season, Toupane was named the NBA D-League Most Improved Player. On October 15, 2016, Toupane was waived by the Nuggets.

=== Milwaukee Bucks / Return to the 905 (2016–2017) ===
On October 30, 2016, Toupane was reacquired by the Raptors 905. On February 25, 2017, he signed a 10-day contract with the Milwaukee Bucks. On March 4, 2017, he was waived by the Bucks and then reacquired by the Raptors 905 later that day.

=== New Orleans Pelicans (2017) ===
On April 10, 2017, Toupane signed with the New Orleans Pelicans for the remainder of the 2016–17 season. On July 25, 2017, he was waived by the Pelicans.

=== Žalgiris (2017–2018) ===
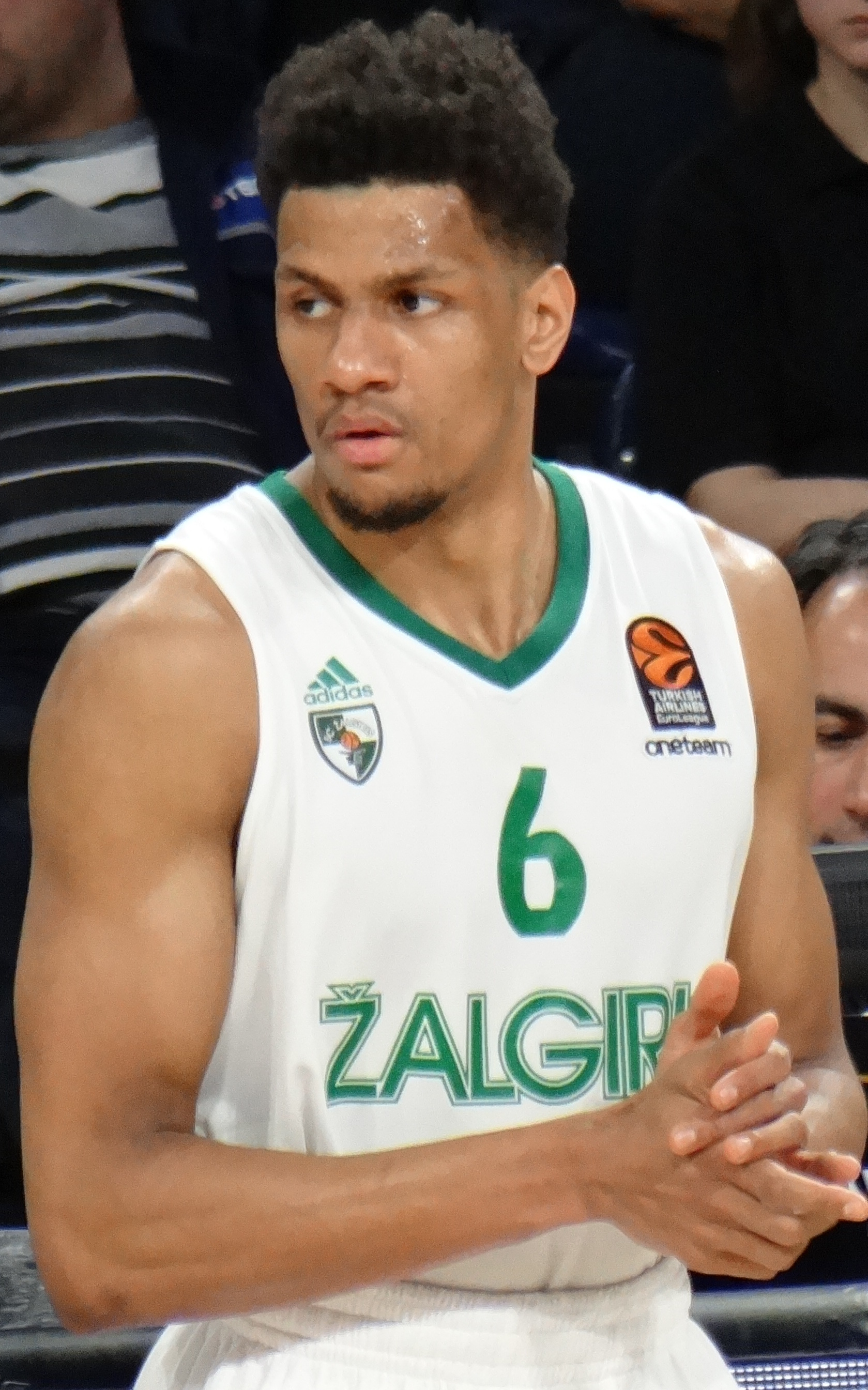
Toupane with Žalgiris in 2018

On July 27, 2017, Toupane signed with the Lithuanian club Žalgiris of the LKL League. His solid defence helped the team in both the Euroleague, where Žalgiris reached the first Final Four in 19 years and finished in third place, and the LKL, where Žalgiris won its eighth consecutive LKL championship. Toupane was among the best players in the league cup series, which Žalgiris also won.

=== Olympiacos (2018–2019) ===
On July 17, 2018, Toupane signed a two-year deal with the Greek team Olympiacos of the EuroLeague. In 45 games, he averaged 5.8 points and 1.8 rebounds per game. On April 13, 2019, Toupane parted ways with Olympiacos.

=== Unicaja (2019–2020) ===
On August 21, 2019, Toupane signed a 1+1 year contract with Unicaja of the Liga ACB.

=== SIG Strasbourg (2020) ===
On September 1, 2020, Toupane signed with SIG Strasbourg until October 17.

=== Santa Cruz Warriors (2021) ===
On December 3, 2020, Toupane signed a training camp deal with the Golden State Warriors. On December 18, 2020, the Warriors released him.

On January 12, 2021, Toupane was included on the roster of the Warriors' affiliate, the Santa Cruz Warriors, for the 2020–21 season that took place at the ESPN Wide World of Sports Complex of Walt Disney World Resort, located near Orlando.

=== Return to the Bucks (2021) ===
On March 14, 2021, the Milwaukee Bucks announced that they had signed Toupane to a two-way contract. In the regular season he played in 8 games, starting one and averaged 1.8 points 0.8 rebounds and 0.5 assists in 7.6 minutes per game. He played in 3 of the 4 games in the first round of the NBA playoffs against the Miami Heat, where the Bucks swept the Heat 4–0. In four total playoff games, Toupane averaged 1.3 points 1.0 rebounds on 50% shooting. Toupane won his first NBA championship when the Bucks defeated the Phoenix Suns in 6 games in the 2021 NBA Finals.

=== Return to Santa Cruz (2021) ===
On October 15, 2021, Toupane signed with the Golden State Warriors, but was waived the next day. On October 25, he was reacquired by the Santa Cruz Warriors.

=== Paris Basketball (2022–2023) ===
On January 6, 2022, Toupane marked his return to France, signing with Paris Basketball of the LNB Pro A until the end of the 2023–2024 season.

=== Metropolitans 92 (2023–2024) ===
On August 9, 2023, he signed with Metropolitans 92 of the French LNB Pro A.

On August 29, 2024, he signed with Diablos Rojos del México of the Liga Nacional de Baloncesto Profesional, he didn't play any games for the team.

=== Homenetmen Beirut (2025) ===
On January 31, 2025, Toupane signed with the Homenetmen Beirut of the Lebanese Basketball League.

=== Taoyuan Taiwan Beer Leopards (2025) ===
On March 22, 2025, Toupane signed with the Taoyuan Taiwan Beer Leopards of the Taiwan Professional Basketball League (TPBL). On August 12, the Taoyuan Taiwan Beer Leopards announced that Toupane left the team.

=== FC Porto (2025–2026) ===
On August 20, 2025, Toupane signed with FC Porto of the Liga Portuguesa de Basquetebol (LPB).

=== ASC Ville de Dakar (2026) ===
On February 27, 2026, Toupane signed with ASC Ville de Dakar of the Nationale 1 Masculin (NM1) and the Basketball Africa League (BAL).

=== Saint-Quentin (2026–present) ===
On September 17, 2026, he signed with Saint-Quentin Basket-Ball of the French LNB Élite.

== National team career ==
As a member of the junior national teams of France, Toupane played at the 2011 FIBA Europe Under-20 Championship, where he won a bronze medal, and at the 2012 FIBA Europe Under-20 Championship, where he won a silver medal. Toupane has also been a member of the senior French national basketball team. With France's senior team, he played at the 2017 EuroBasket.

== Career statistics ==
Legend
GP	Games played	GS	Games started	MPG	Minutes per game
FG%	Field-goal percentage	3P%	3-point field-goal percentage	FT%	Free-throw percentage
RPG	Rebounds per game	APG	Assists per game	SPG	Steals per game
BPG	Blocks per game	PPG	Points per game	PIR	Performance index rating
**Bold**	Career high

=== NBA ===
==== Regular season ====
Year	Team	GP	GS	MPG	FG%	3P%	FT%	RPG	APG	SPG	BPG	PPG
2015–16	Denver	**21**	0	14.5	.357	.325	**.765**	**1.5**	**.7**	.3	.3	3.6
2016–17	Milwaukee	2	0	3.0	.000	.000	—	.0	.0	.0	.0	.0
2016–17	New Orleans	2	0	**20.5**	**.625**	.333	—	.5	.0	**.5**	**.5**	**5.5**
2020–21†	Milwaukee	8	**1**	7.6	.364	**.500**	.714	.8	.5	.3	.4	1.8
Career		33	1	12.5	.378	.326	.750	1.2	.6	.3	.3	3.1

==== Playoffs ====
Year	Team	GP	GS	MPG	FG%	3P%	FT%	RPG	APG	SPG	BPG	PPG
2020–21†	Milwaukee	4	0	2.5	.500	.500	–	1.0	.0	.0	.0	1.3

=== EuroLeague ===
Year	Team	GP	GS	MPG	FG%	3P%	FT%	RPG	APG	SPG	BPG	PPG	PIR
2013–14	Strasbourg	10	2	15.1	.355	.143	.500	**2.7**	**.9**	.2	.1	2.5	2.4
2017–18	Žalgiris	**34**	**21**	**15.3**	**.503**	**.375**	.711	2.1	.5	.4	.1	**6.9**	**5.8**
2018–19	Olympiacos	26	4	13.3	.382	.361	**.815**	1.2	.5	**.5**	**.2**	4.8	3.3
Career		70	27	14.6	.444	.353	.727	1.9	.5	.4	.1	5.5	4.4

== Personal life ==
Toupane is the son of Jean-Aimé Toupane, a basketball coach and former player of Senegalese descent, and a French mother.
