= 2020–21 Brooklyn Nets season =

Season of National Basketball Association team the Brooklyn Nets

- Head coach: Steve Nash
- General manager: Sean Marks
- Owners: Joseph Tsai
- Arena: Barclays Center

Results
- Record: 48–24 (.667)
- Place: Division: 2nd (Atlantic); Conference: 2nd (Eastern)
- Playoff finish: Conference semifinals (lost to Bucks 3–4)
- Stats at Basketball Reference

Local media
- Television: YES Network, WPIX
- Radio: WFAN AM/FM

The 2020–21 Brooklyn Nets season was the 45th season of the franchise in the National Basketball Association (NBA), 54th season overall, and its ninth season playing in the New York City borough of Brooklyn. On September 3, 2020, the Nets hired Steve Nash as their new head coach.

In the beginning of the 2020–21 season, the Nets acquired James Harden in a four-team trade on January 14, 2021. The trade reunited him with former Oklahoma City Thunder teammate Kevin Durant, and along with Kyrie Irving, the Nets created a superteam.

The Nets set a franchise record for three-point field goals during the game versus the Sacramento Kings on February 15, 2021, with 27 three-point field goals, and narrowly missed the NBA record (29), which was set by the Milwaukee Bucks on December 29, 2020.

Fan attendance in home games was prohibited until February 23, 2021, per an executive order from Governor of New York Andrew Cuomo. The Nets reopened the Barclays Center to spectators on February 23.

The Nets clinched a playoff berth for the third straight year, following their victory over the Toronto Raptors on April 27, becoming the first Eastern Conference team, and second overall to do so.

The Nets faced the Boston Celtics in the first round of the 2021 NBA playoffs, defeating them in five games. The Nets then faced the eventual champion Milwaukee Bucks in the conference semifinals and lost the series in seven games despite taking a 2–0 and later a 3–2 lead.

== Draft ==
2020 NBA draft picks
Round	Pick	Player	Position	Nationality	School/club
1	19	Saddiq Bey	SF	United States	Villanova
2	55	Jay Scrubb	SG	United States	John A. Logan

The Nets entered the draft holding one first-round pick and one second-round pick. The lottery-protected first-round pick was acquired on June 20, 2019, in a trade with the Los Angeles Clippers and conveyed to the team when its original owner, the Philadelphia 76ers, made the 2020 NBA playoffs. The second-round pick was acquired on July 13, 2018, in a trade with the Denver Nuggets. The Nets used their 19th overall pick to select Saddiq Bey, and then selected Jay Scrubb with the 55th overall pick.

== Roster ==
2020–21 Brooklyn Nets roster
Players

Pos.	No.	Player	Height	Weight	DOB	From
G/F	1	Bruce Brown	6 ft 4 in (1.93 m)	202 lb (92 kg)	1996-08-15	Miami (FL)
G	4	Chris Chiozza (TW)	5 ft 11 in (1.80 m)	175 lb (79 kg)	1995-11-25	Florida
F/C	33	Nic Claxton	6 ft 11 in (2.11 m)	215 lb (98 kg)	1999-04-17	Georgia
G	26	Spencer Dinwiddie (injured)	6 ft 5 in (1.96 m)	215 lb (98 kg)	1993-04-06	Colorado
F	7	Kevin Durant	6 ft 10 in (2.08 m)	240 lb (109 kg)	1988-09-29	Texas
F	8	Jeff Green	6 ft 8 in (2.03 m)	235 lb (107 kg)	1986-08-28	Georgetown
F	2	Blake Griffin	6 ft 9 in (2.06 m)	250 lb (113 kg)	1989-03-16	Oklahoma
G	13	James Harden	6 ft 5 in (1.96 m)	220 lb (100 kg)	1989-08-26	Arizona State
G/F	12	Joe Harris	6 ft 6 in (1.98 m)	220 lb (100 kg)	1991-09-07	Virginia
G	11	Kyrie Irving	6 ft 2 in (1.88 m)	195 lb (88 kg)	1992-03-23	Duke
G	55	Mike James	6 ft 1 in (1.85 m)	175 lb (79 kg)	1990-08-18	Lamar
F	24	Alize Johnson	6 ft 7 in (2.01 m)	212 lb (96 kg)	1996-04-22	Missouri State
G	10	Tyler Johnson	6 ft 3 in (1.91 m)	186 lb (84 kg)	1992-05-07	Fresno State
C	6	DeAndre Jordan	6 ft 11 in (2.11 m)	265 lb (120 kg)	1988-07-21	Texas A&M
G/F	9	Timothé Luwawu-Cabarrot	6 ft 7 in (2.01 m)	220 lb (100 kg)	1995-05-09	France
F/C	0	Reggie Perry (TW)	6 ft 8 in (2.03 m)	250 lb (113 kg)	2000-03-21	Mississippi State
G	20	Landry Shamet	6 ft 4 in (1.93 m)	190 lb (86 kg)	1997-03-13	Wichita State

Coaches
Head coach
- Steve Nash
Assistant(s)
- Mike D'Antoni
- Ryan Forehan-Kelly
- Adam Harrington
- Royal Ivey
- Jordan Ott
- Tiago Splitter
- Ime Udoka
- Jacque Vaughn

Legend
- (DP) Unsigned draft pick
- (FA) Free agent
- (S) Suspended
- (GL) On assignment to G League affiliate
- (TW) Two-way affiliate player
- Injured

Roster
Updated: June 19, 2021

== Standings ==
=== Division ===
Atlantic Division	W	L	PCT	GB	Home	Road	Div	GP
c − Philadelphia 76ers	49	23	.681	–	29‍–‍7	20‍–‍16	10–2	72
x – Brooklyn Nets	48	24	.667	1.0	28‍–‍8	20‍–‍16	8–4	72
x – New York Knicks	41	31	.569	8.0	25‍–‍11	16‍–‍20	4–8	72
x – Boston Celtics	36	36	.500	13.0	21‍–‍15	15‍–‍21	4–8	72
Toronto Raptors	27	45	.375	22.0	16‍–‍20	11‍–‍25	4–8	72

=== Conference ===
Eastern Conference
#	Team	W	L	PCT	GB	GP
1	c − Philadelphia 76ers *	49	23	.681	–	72
2	x – Brooklyn Nets	48	24	.667	1.0	72
3	y – Milwaukee Bucks *	46	26	.639	3.0	72
4	x – New York Knicks	41	31	.569	8.0	72
5	y – Atlanta Hawks *	41	31	.569	8.0	72
6	x – Miami Heat	40	32	.556	9.0	72
7	x – Boston Celtics	36	36	.500	13.0	72
8	x – Washington Wizards	34	38	.472	15.0	72
9	pi – Indiana Pacers	34	38	.472	15.0	72
10	pi – Charlotte Hornets	33	39	.458	16.0	72
11	Chicago Bulls	31	41	.431	18.0	72
12	Toronto Raptors	27	45	.375	22.0	72
13	Cleveland Cavaliers	22	50	.306	27.0	72
14	Orlando Magic	21	51	.292	28.0	72
15	Detroit Pistons	20	52	.278	29.0	72

== Game log ==
=== Preseason ===
The preseason schedule was announced on November 27, 2020.

2020 preseason game log
Total: 2–0 (home: 1–0; road: 1–0)
Preseason: 2–0 (home: 1–0; road: 1–0)

Game	Date	Team	Score	High points	High rebounds	High assists	Location Attendance	Record
1	December 13	Washington	W 119–114	Irving (18)	Jordan, Perry (7)	Dinwiddie (7)	Barclays Center; No in-person attendance	1–0
2	December 18	@ Boston	W 113–89	Durant (25)	Allen (11)	Irving, Jordan (5)	TD Garden; No in-person attendance	2–0

2020–21 preseason schedule

=== Regular season ===
The regular season schedule for the first two games of the season was released on December 2, 2020, while the schedule for the first half of the season was released on December 4. The schedule for the second half of the season was released on February 24, 2021.

2020–21 game log
Total: 48–24 (home: 28–8; road: 20–16)
December: 3–2 (home: 2–1; road: 1–1)

Game	Date	Team	Score	High points	High rebounds	High assists	Location Attendance	Record
1	December 22	Golden State	W 125–99	Irving (26)	Jordan (11)	LeVert (5)	Barclays Center; No in-person attendance	1–0
2	December 25	@ Boston	W 123–95	Irving (37)	Allen (11)	Irving (8)	TD Garden; No in-person attendance	2–0
3	December 27	@ Charlotte	L 104–106	Durant (29)	Allen (14)	Irving (6)	Spectrum Center; No in-person attendance	2–1
4	December 28	Memphis	L 111–116 (OT)	LeVert (28)	Allen (15)	LeVert (11)	Barclays Center; No in-person attendance	2–2
5	December 30	Atlanta	W 145–141	Durant (33)	Allen (13)	Durant, LeVert (8)	Barclays Center; No in-person attendance	3–2

January: 10–7 (home: 7–3; road: 3–4)

Game	Date	Team	Score	High points	High rebounds	High assists	Location Attendance	Record
6	January 1	Atlanta	L 96–114	Durant (28)	Irving (11)	Durant, Irving (4)	Barclays Center; No in-person attendance	3–3
7	January 3	Washington	L 122–123	Irving (30)	Allen, Durant (11)	Irving (10)	Barclays Center; No in-person attendance	3–4
8	January 5	Utah	W 130–96	Irving (29)	Allen (18)	T. Johnson (7)	Barclays Center; No in-person attendance	4–4
9	January 7	Philadelphia	W 122–109	Harris (28)	Allen, Jordan (11)	LeVert (10)	Barclays Center; No in-person attendance	5–4
10	January 8	@ Memphis	L 110–115	LeVert (43)	Green (9)	Allen, LeVert (6)	FedExForum; No in-person attendance	5–5
11	January 10	Oklahoma City	L 116–129	Durant (36)	Durant (11)	LeVert (6)	Barclays Center; No in-person attendance	5–6
12	January 12	Denver	W 122–116	Durant (34)	Durant (9)	Durant (13)	Barclays Center; No in-person attendance	6–6
13	January 13	@ New York	W 116–109	Durant (26)	Brown (14)	Chiozza (7)	Madison Square Garden; No in-person attendance	7–6
14	January 16	Orlando	W 122–115	Durant (42)	Harden (12)	Harden (14)	Barclays Center; No in-person attendance	8–6
15	January 18	Milwaukee	W 125–123	Harden (34)	Jordan (12)	Harden (12)	Barclays Center; No in-person attendance	9–6
16	January 20	@ Cleveland	L 135–147 (2OT)	Durant (38)	Durant (12)	Harden (12)	Rocket Mortgage FieldHouse; 1,944	9–7
17	January 22	@ Cleveland	L 113–125	Irving (38)	Harris (7)	Harden (11)	Rocket Mortgage FieldHouse; 1,944	9–8
18	January 23	Miami	W 128–124	Durant (31)	Jordan, Brown (8)	Harden (11)	Barclays Center; No in-person attendance	10–8
19	January 25	Miami	W 98–85	Durant, Harden (20)	Durant (13)	Harden (8)	Barclays Center; No in-person attendance	11–8
20	January 27	@ Atlanta	W 132–128 (OT)	Durant (32)	Harden (8)	Harden (15)	State Farm Arena; 1,008	12–8
21	January 29	@ Oklahoma City	W 147–125	Harden, Irving (25)	Perry (11)	Harden (11)	Chesapeake Energy Arena; No in-person attendance	13–8
22	January 31	@ Washington	L 146–149	Durant (37)	Brown (9)	Irving (8)	Capital One Arena; No in-person attendance	13–9

February: 9–4 (home: 4–2; road: 5–2)

Game	Date	Team	Score	High points	High rebounds	High assists	Location Attendance	Record
23	February 2	L.A. Clippers	W 124–120	Irving (39)	Harden (11)	Harden (14)	Barclays Center; No in-person attendance	14–9
24	February 5	Toronto	L 117–123	Harris (19)	Harden (7)	Harden (12)	Barclays Center; No in-person attendance	14–10
25	February 6	@ Philadelphia	L 108–124	Harden (26)	Harden (8)	Harden (10)	Wells Fargo Center; No in-person attendance	14–11
26	February 9	@ Detroit	L 111–122	Irving (27)	Brown (9)	Harden (12)	Little Caesars Arena; No in-person attendance	14–12
27	February 10	Indiana	W 104–94	Irving (35)	Jordan (13)	Irving (8)	Barclays Center; No in-person attendance	15–12
28	February 13	@ Golden State	W 134–117	Irving (23)	Harden (8)	Harden (16)	Chase Center; No in-person attendance	16–12
29	February 15	@ Sacramento	W 136–125	Irving (40)	Harden (13)	Harden (14)	Golden 1 Center; No in-person attendance	17–12
30	February 16	@ Phoenix	W 128–124	Harden (38)	Green (8)	Harden (11)	Phoenix Suns Arena; 3,181	18–12
31	February 18	@ L.A. Lakers	W 109–98	Harden (23)	Jordan (8)	Harden (11)	Staples Center; No in-person attendance	19–12
32	February 21	@ L.A. Clippers	W 112–108	Harden (37)	Harden, Jordan (11)	Irving (8)	Staples Center; No in-person attendance	20–12
33	February 23	Sacramento	W 127–118	Brown, Harden (29)	Harden (11)	Harden (14)	Barclays Center; 324	21–12
34	February 25	Orlando	W 129–92	Irving (27)	Jordan (11)	Irving (9)	Barclays Center; 327	22–12
35	February 27	Dallas	L 98–115	Harden (29)	Brown (9)	Harden (6)	Barclays Center; 684	22–13

March: 11–2 (home: 6–0; road: 5–2)

Game	Date	Team	Score	High points	High rebounds	High assists	Location Attendance	Record
36	March 1	@ San Antonio	W 124–113 (OT)	Harden (30)	Harden (14)	Harden (15)	AT&T Center; No in-person attendance	23–13
37	March 3	@ Houston	W 132–114	Harden (29)	Harden, Jordan (10)	Harden (14)	Toyota Center; 3,615	24–13
38	March 11	Boston	W 121–109	Irving (40)	Harden (10)	Harden (8)	Barclays Center; 1,374	25–13
39	March 13	Detroit	W 100–95	Harden (24)	Harden (10)	Harden (10)	Barclays Center; 1,364	26–13
40	March 15	New York	W 117–112	Irving (34)	Harden (15)	Harden (15)	Barclays Center; 1,637	27–13
41	March 17	@ Indiana	W 124–115	Harden (40)	Harden (10)	Harden (15)	Bankers Life Fieldhouse; No in-person attendance	28–13
42	March 19	@ Orlando	L 113–121	Irving (43)	Brown (7)	Harden (9)	Amway Center; 3,665	28–14
43	March 21	Washington	W 113–106	Irving (28)	Irving (7)	Harden (8)	Barclays Center; 1,773	29–14
44	March 23	@ Portland	W 116–112	Harden (25)	Jordan (10)	Harden (17)	Moda Center; No in-person attendance	30–14
45	March 24	@ Utah	L 88–118	A. Johnson (23)	A. Johnson (15)	Chiozza (11)	Vivint Arena; 5,546	30–15
46	March 26	@ Detroit	W 113–111	Harden (44)	Harden (14)	Harden (8)	Little Caesars Arena; 750	31–15
47	March 29	Minnesota	W 112–107	Harden (38)	Harden (11)	Harden (13)	Barclays Center; 1,732	32–15
48	March 31	Houston	W 120–108	Irving (31)	Claxton, Harden (8)	Irving (12)	Barclays Center; 1,773	33–15

April: 10–6 (home: 6–2; road: 4–4)

Game	Date	Team	Score	High points	High rebounds	High assists	Location Attendance	Record
49	April 1	Charlotte	W 111–89	Green (21)	Irving (11)	Irving (8)	Barclays Center; 1,773	34–15
50	April 4	@ Chicago	L 107–115	Irving (24)	Griffin (8)	Irving (15)	United Center; No in-person attendance	34–16
51	April 5	New York	W 114–112	Irving (40)	Harris (8)	Irving (7)	Barclays Center; 1,773	35–16
52	April 7	New Orleans	W 139–111	Irving (24)	Brown (8)	Chiozza (8)	Barclays Center; 1,773	36–16
53	April 10	L.A. Lakers	L 101–126	Durant (22)	Brown, Durant (7)	Durant (5)	Barclays Center; 1,773	36–17
—	April 12	@ Minnesota	—	Postponed for security reasons due to Daunte Wright protests; moved to April 13			Target Center	—
54	April 13	@ Minnesota	W 127–97	Durant (31)	Brown (12)	Chiozza, Shamet (5)	Target Center; No in-person attendance	37–17
55	April 14	@ Philadelphia	L 117–123	Irving (37)	Jordan (14)	Irving (9)	Wells Fargo Center; 4,094	37–18
56	April 16	Charlotte	W 130–115	Harris (26)	Claxton (9)	Durant (11)	Barclays Center; 1,773	38–18
57	April 18	@ Miami	L 107–109	Shamet (30)	Brown (11)	Irving (9)	American Airlines Arena; No in-person attendance	38–19
58	April 20	@ New Orleans	W 134–129	Irving (32)	Brown (11)	Irving, Shamet (8)	Smoothie King Center; 3,700	39–19
59	April 21	@ Toronto	L 103–114	Irving (28)	Brown (14)	Irving (8)	Amalie Arena; No in-person attendance	39–20
60	April 23	Boston	W 109–104	Harris (20)	Jordan (11)	Irving (11)	Barclays Center; 1,773	40–20
61	April 25	Phoenix	W 128–119	Irving (34)	Jordan (12)	Irving (12)	Barclays Center; 1,773	41–20
62	April 27	@ Toronto	W 116–103	Green (22)	Durant (10)	James (8)	Amalie Arena; No in-person attendance	42–20
63	April 29	@ Indiana	W 130–113	Durant (42)	A. Johnson (21)	Durant (10)	Bankers Life Fieldhouse; No in-person attendance	43–20
64	April 30	Portland	L 109–128	Irving (28)	A. Johnson (12)	Griffin (4)	Barclays Center; 1,773	43–21

May: 5–3 (home: 3–0; road: 2–3)

Game	Date	Team	Score	High points	High rebounds	High assists	Location Attendance	Record
65	May 2	@ Milwaukee	L 114–117	Durant (42)	Jordan (11)	Irving (6)	Fiserv Forum; 3,280	43–22
66	May 4	@ Milwaukee	L 118–124	Irving (38)	Durant, Jordan (9)	Durant (6)	Fiserv Forum; 3,280	43–23
67	May 6	@ Dallas	L 109–113	Irving (45)	Griffin (10)	Irving, James (4)	American Airlines Center; 4,602	43–24
68	May 8	@ Denver	W 125–119	Durant (33)	Durant (11)	Durant (7)	Ball Arena; 4,044	44–24
69	May 11	@ Chicago	W 115–107	Durant (21)	Brown, Claxton (10)	Durant (8)	United Center; 3,434	45–24
70	May 12	San Antonio	W 128–116	Shamet (21)	Brown (11)	Harden (11)	Barclays Center; 1,773	46–24
71	May 15	Chicago	W 105–91	Irving (22)	Brown (12)	Harden (7)	Barclays Center; 1,773	47–24
72	May 16	Cleveland	W 123–109	Durant (23)	Durant (8)	Durant (13)	Barclays Center; 1,773	48–24

2020–21 season schedule

=== Playoffs ===
2021 playoff game log
Total: 7–5 (home: 6–1; road: 1–4)
First round: 4–1 (home: 3–0; road: 1–1)

Game	Date	Team	Score	High points	High rebounds	High assists	Location Attendance	Series
1	May 22	Boston	W 104–93	Durant (32)	Durant (12)	Harden (8)	Barclays Center; 14,391	1–0
2	May 25	Boston	W 130–108	Durant (26)	Brown, Durant (8)	Harden (7)	Barclays Center; 14,774	2–0
3	May 28	@ Boston	L 119–125	Harden (41)	Durant (9)	Harden (10)	TD Garden; 4,789	2–1
4	May 30	@ Boston	W 141–126	Durant (42)	Irving (11)	Harden (18)	TD Garden; 17,226	3–1
5	June 1	Boston	W 123–109	Harden (34)	Harden (10)	Harden (10)	Barclays Center; 14,993	4–1

Conference semifinals: 3–4 (home: 3–1; road: 0–3)

Game	Date	Team	Score	High points	High rebounds	High assists	Location Attendance	Series
1	June 5	Milwaukee	W 115–107	Durant (29)	Griffin (14)	Irving (8)	Barclays Center; 15,750	1–0
2	June 7	Milwaukee	W 125–86	Durant (32)	Griffin (8)	Durant, Irving (6)	Barclays Center; 15,776	2–0
3	June 10	@ Milwaukee	L 83–86	Durant (30)	Brown, Durant (11)	Durant (5)	Fiserv Forum; 16,310	2–1
4	June 13	@ Milwaukee	L 96–107	Durant (28)	Durant (13)	Durant (5)	Fiserv Forum; 16,310	2–2
5	June 15	Milwaukee	W 114–108	Durant (49)	Durant (17)	Durant (10)	Barclays Center; 16,067	3–2
6	June 17	@ Milwaukee	L 89–104	Durant (32)	Durant (11)	Harden (7)	Fiserv Forum; 16,310	3–3
7	June 19	Milwaukee	L 111–115 (OT)	Durant (48)	Griffin (11)	Harden (9)	Barclays Center; 16,287	3–4

2021 playoff schedule

== Player statistics ==
Legend
GP	Games played	GS	Games started	MPG	Minutes per game
FG%	Field-goal percentage	3P%	3-point field-goal percentage	FT%	Free-throw percentage
RPG	Rebounds per game	APG	Assists per game	SPG	Steals per game
BPG	Blocks per game	PPG	Points per game

=== Regular season statistics ===
As of May 16, 2021

Brooklyn Nets statistics
Player	GP	GS	MPG	FG%	3P%	FT%	RPG	APG	SPG	BPG	PPG
LaMarcus Aldridge	5	5	26.0	.521	.800	1.000	4.8	2.6	.6	2.2	12.8
Jarrett Allen	12	5	26.7	.677	—	.754	10.4	1.7	.6	1.6	11.2
Bruce Brown	65	37	22.3	.556	.288	.735	5.4	1.6	.9	.4	8.8
Chris Chiozza	22	1	10.5	.352	.310	.765	1.1	3.0	.3	.3	4.0
Nic Claxton	32	1	18.6	.621	.200	.484	5.2	.9	.7	1.3	6.6
Tyler Cook	4	0	4.3	.333	—	—	.5	.5	.0	.0	.5
Spencer Dinwiddie	3	3	21.3	.375	.286	1.000	4.3	3.0	.7	.3	6.7
Kevin Durant	35	32	33.1	.537	.450	.882	7.1	5.6	.7	1.3	26.9
Jeff Green	68	38	27.0	.492	.412	.776	3.9	1.6	.5	.4	11.0
Blake Griffin	26	10	21.5	.492	.383	.782	4.7	2.4	.7	.5	10.0
James Harden	36	35	36.6	.471	.366	.856	8.5	10.9	1.3	.8	24.6
Joe Harris	69	65	31.0	.505	.475	.778	3.6	1.9	.7	.2	14.1
Kyrie Irving	54	54	34.9	.506	.402	.922	4.8	6.0	1.4	.7	26.9
Mike James	13	1	18.2	.370	.355	.778	2.5	4.2	.5	.1	7.7
Alize Johnson	18	0	10.5	.588	.167	1.000	5.0	.8	.3	.3	5.2
Tyler Johnson	39	3	17.5	.393	.364	.857	2.0	1.2	.4	.0	5.4
DeAndre Jordan	57	43	21.9	.763	.000	.500	7.5	1.6	.3	1.1	7.5
Rodions Kurucs	5	0	3.2	.333	.500	—	.6	.4	.0	.0	.6
Caris LeVert	12	4	27.8	.435	.349	.765	4.3	6.0	1.1	.5	18.5
Timothé Luwawu-Cabarrot	58	7	18.1	.365	.314	.814	2.2	1.2	.6	.1	6.4
Norvel Pelle	3	0	9.3	.426	—	—	2.3	.0	.0	1.0	2.0
Reggie Perry	26	0	8.1	.410	.190	.769	2.8	.5	.2	.2	3.0
Taurean Prince	12	4	18.2	.405	.351	.889	2.8	.6	.7	.7	8.1
André Roberson	5	0	12.6	.143	.125	.500	3.0	.8	.6	.2	1.2
Landry Shamet	61	12	23.0	.408	.387	.846	1.8	1.6	.5	.2	9.3
Iman Shumpert	2	0	5.5	.250	.000	—	.5	.0	.5	.0	1.0
Noah Vonleh	4	0	2.8	.000	.000	—	.3	.3	.0	.0	.0

=== Playoff statistics ===
As of June 19, 2021

Brooklyn Nets statistics
Player	GP	GS	MPG	FG%	3P%	FT%	RPG	APG	SPG	BPG	PPG
Bruce Brown	12	5	23.1	.506	.182	.813	5.1	2.1	.7	.4	7.9
Chris Chiozza	6	0	3.2	.286	.333	—	.2	.2	.2	.0	.8
Nic Claxton	12	0	10.8	.483	—	.667	2.8	.6	.3	1.0	2.5
Kevin Durant	12	12	40.4	.514	.402	.871	9.3	4.4	1.5	1.6	34.3
Jeff Green	6	1	24.7	.485	.556	.875	2.8	1.7	.5	.3	8.2
Blake Griffin	12	12	26.5	.532	.389	.714	5.9	1.8	.8	.5	9.0
James Harden	9	9	35.8	.472	.364	.903	6.3	8.6	1.7	.7	20.2
Joe Harris	12	12	36.2	.398	.402	.750	3.6	1.6	.3	.2	11.2
Kyrie Irving	9	9	36.1	.472	.369	.929	5.8	3.4	1.0	.6	22.7
Mike James	9	0	11.4	.326	.313	—	1.8	1.3	.2	.0	3.7
Alize Johnson	5	0	4.6	.571	—	—	2.6	.0	.6	.0	1.6
Tyler Johnson	8	0	8.6	.353	.273	1.000	.8	.6	.3	.0	2.1
Timothé Luwawu-Cabarrot	7	0	3.6	.300	.333	—	.4	.3	.0	.0	1.1
Reggie Perry	5	0	4.4	.538	.400	—	1.2	.2	.2	.0	3.2
Landry Shamet	12	0	17.2	.439	.385	.800	1.8	.6	.4	.1	4.2

== Transactions ==
=== Trades ===
November 19, 2020	To Brooklyn Nets Bruce Brown; Landry Shamet; Draft rights to Reggie Perry	To Los Angeles Clippers Luke Kennard; Justin Patton; Draft rights to Jay Scrubb; 2023 second-round pick 2024 second-round pick 2025 second-round pick 2026 second-round pick
November 19, 2020	To Detroit Pistons Rodney McGruder; Džanan Musa; Draft rights to Saddiq Bey; Draft rights to Jaylen Hands; 2021 second-round pick Cash considerations	
January 14, 2021	To Brooklyn Nets James Harden; 2024 second-round pick	To Houston Rockets Dante Exum; Rodions Kurucs; Victor Oladipo; 2022 first-round pick 2022 first-round pick 2024 first-round pick 2026 first-round pick 2021 first-round pick swap 2023 first-round pick swap 2025 first-round pick swap 2027 first-round pick swap
January 14, 2021	To Cleveland Cavaliers Jarrett Allen; Taurean Prince; Draft rights to Sasha Vezenkov	To Indiana Pacers Caris LeVert; 2023 second-round pick 2024 second-round pick Cash considerations

=== Additions ===
Date	Player	Former team	Ref
November 23, 2020	Jeff Green	Houston Rockets	
December 1, 2020	Jordan Bowden	Tennessee Volunteers	
December 1, 2020	Nate Sestina	Kentucky Wildcats	
December 16, 2020	Kaiser Gates	Maine Red Claws	
December 16, 2020	Élie Okobo	Phoenix Suns	
December 18, 2020	Paul Eboua	Stella Azzurra	
January 28, 2021	Norvel Pelle	Philadelphia 76ers	
January 30, 2021	Iman Shumpert	—	
February 8, 2021	Noah Vonleh	Denver Nuggets	
February 16, 2021	André Roberson	Oklahoma City Thunder	
February 24, 2021	Tyler Cook	Iowa Wolves	
February 26, 2021	André Roberson	—	
February 26, 2021	Iman Shumpert	—	
March 8, 2021	Blake Griffin	Detroit Pistons	
March 22, 2021	Alize Johnson	Raptors 905	
March 28, 2021	LaMarcus Aldridge	San Antonio Spurs	
April 1, 2021	Alize Johnson	—	
April 11, 2021	Alize Johnson	—	
April 23, 2021	Mike James	CSKA Moscow	
May 3, 2021	Mike James	—	
May 13, 2021	Mike James	—	

=== Subtractions ===
Date	Player	New team	Ref
November 27, 2020	Garrett Temple	Chicago Bulls	
December 3, 2020	Justin Anderson	Philadelphia 76ers	
December 11, 2020	Jordan Bowden	Long Island Nets	
December 11, 2020	Nate Sestina	Long Island Nets	
December 17, 2020	Kaiser Gates	Long Island Nets	
December 19, 2020	Paul Eboua	Long Island Nets	
December 19, 2020	Élie Okobo	Long Island Nets	
December 22, 2020	Jeremiah Martin	Long Island Nets	
January 14, 2021	Donta Hall	NBA G League Ignite	
February 16, 2021	Norvel Pelle	Canton Charge	
February 23, 2021	André Roberson	Oklahoma City Blue	
February 23, 2021	Iman Shumpert		
February 23, 2021	Noah Vonleh	Shanghai Sharks	
March 19, 2021	Tyler Cook	Detroit Pistons	
