= 2020–21 Philadelphia 76ers season =

NBA professional basketball team season

- Division champions
- Head coach: Doc Rivers
- President: Daryl Morey
- General manager: Elton Brand
- Owners: Josh Harris
- Arena: Wells Fargo Center

Results
- Record: 49–23 (.681)
- Place: Division: 1st (Atlantic); Conference: 1st (Eastern)
- Playoff finish: Conference semifinals (lost to Hawks 3–4)
- Stats at Basketball Reference

Local media
- Television: NBCSPHI, NBCSPHI+, 6ABC
- Radio: WPEN

The 2020–21 Philadelphia 76ers season was the 72nd season of the franchise in the National Basketball Association (NBA). The 76ers replaced Brett Brown with former Los Angeles Clippers coach Doc Rivers on October 3. In the shortened season (72 games instead of the normal 82) due to the ongoing COVID-19 pandemic, the 76ers finished the regular season at 49–23 which was first place in the Eastern Conference, one game ahead of the Brooklyn Nets. This was the first time since the 2000–01 club did so with a 56–26 record. This also was the last full season that Ben Simmons was on the team, as he missed all of the following season due to a recurring back injury, refused to attend training camp, which lead to him getting repeatedly fined, requesting a trade, and then, per his request, getting traded to the Brooklyn Nets on February 10th, 2022.

In the opening round of the playoffs, the Sixers defeated the Washington Wizards in five games. In the conference semifinals against the Atlanta Hawks, the 76ers would lose in seven games which included a squandered 26-point lead in game 5.

== Draft picks ==
Round	Pick	Player	Position(s)	Nationality	College / Club
1	21	Tyrese Maxey	PG	United States	Kentucky
2	34	Théo Maledon	PG	France	ASVEL
2	36	Tyler Bey	SF	United States	Colorado
2	49	Isaiah Joe	SG	United States	Arkansas
2	58	Paul Reed	PF	United States	DePaul

Before the start of the 2020 NBA draft period, the 76ers' first-round selection (held by the Oklahoma City Thunder) was originally held stuck as the 22nd selection (while their own pick they traded to the Brooklyn Nets via the Los Angeles Clippers was held at #20) before the NBA suspended their season on March 12, 2020. However, with the 76ers resuming their prior season in the 2020 NBA Bubble, it left them chances to lose or gain ground for this draft period. Finally, the 76ers received the #21 pick from the Thunder as it fell outside the Top 20, while the Nets gained the #19 pick as it fell outside its lottery protection when the 76ers made the 2020 NBA playoffs. They also gained four second-round selections for this draft, including their own pick at #49, through trades involving the Atlanta Hawks, the New York Knicks, and the Orlando Magic via the Los Angeles Lakers.

== Roster ==
2020–21 Philadelphia 76ers roster
Players

Pos.	No.	Player	Height	Weight	DOB	From
SF	11	Gary Clark (TW)	6 ft 6 in (1.98 m)	225 lb (102 kg)	1994-11-16	Cincinnati
SG	31	Seth Curry	6 ft 2 in (1.88 m)	185 lb (84 kg)	1990-08-23	Duke
C	21	Joel Embiid	7 ft 0 in (2.13 m)	280 lb (127 kg)	1994-03-16	Kansas
SF	14	Danny Green	6 ft 6 in (1.98 m)	215 lb (98 kg)	1987-06-22	North Carolina
PF	12	Tobias Harris	6 ft 9 in (2.06 m)	235 lb (107 kg)	1992-07-15	Tennessee
PG	33	George Hill	6 ft 4 in (1.93 m)	188 lb (85 kg)	1986-05-04	IUPUI
C	39	Dwight Howard	6 ft 10 in (2.08 m)	265 lb (120 kg)	1985-12-08	SACA (GA)
SG	7	Isaiah Joe	6 ft 4 in (1.93 m)	165 lb (75 kg)	1999-07-02	Arkansas
SG	30	Furkan Korkmaz	6 ft 7 in (2.01 m)	202 lb (92 kg)	1997-07-24	Turkey
PG	0	Tyrese Maxey	6 ft 2 in (1.88 m)	200 lb (91 kg)	2000-10-04	Kentucky
SG	18	Shake Milton	6 ft 5 in (1.96 m)	205 lb (93 kg)	1996-09-26	SMU
PF	44	Paul Reed	6 ft 9 in (2.06 m)	220 lb (100 kg)	1999-06-26	DePaul
PF	1	Mike Scott	6 ft 7 in (2.01 m)	237 lb (108 kg)	1988-07-16	Virginia
PG	25	Ben Simmons	6 ft 11 in (2.11 m)	240 lb (109 kg)	1996-07-20	LSU
SF	22	Matisse Thybulle	6 ft 5 in (1.96 m)	200 lb (91 kg)	1997-03-04	Washington
PF	43	Anthony Tolliver	6 ft 8 in (2.03 m)	240 lb (109 kg)	1985-06-01	Creighton
SG	9	Rayjon Tucker (TW)	6 ft 3 in (1.91 m)	209 lb (95 kg)	1997-09-24	Little Rock

Coaches
Head coach
- Doc Rivers
Assistant(s)
- Brian Adams
- Dan Burke
- Sam Cassell
- Eric Hughes
- Dave Joerger
- Popeye Jones

Legend
- (DP) Unsigned draft pick
- (FA) Free agent
- (S) Suspended
- (GL) On assignment to G League
- (TW) Two-way affiliate player
- Injured

Roster

== Standings ==
=== Atlantic division ===
Atlantic Division	W	L	PCT	GB	Home	Road	Div	GP
c − Philadelphia 76ers	49	23	.681	–	29‍–‍7	20‍–‍16	10–2	72
x – Brooklyn Nets	48	24	.667	1.0	28‍–‍8	20‍–‍16	8–4	72
x – New York Knicks	41	31	.569	8.0	25‍–‍11	16‍–‍20	4–8	72
x – Boston Celtics	36	36	.500	13.0	21‍–‍15	15‍–‍21	4–8	72
Toronto Raptors	27	45	.375	22.0	16‍–‍20	11‍–‍25	4–8	72

=== Conference standings ===
Eastern Conference
#	Team	W	L	PCT	GB	GP
1	c − Philadelphia 76ers *	49	23	.681	–	72
2	x – Brooklyn Nets	48	24	.667	1.0	72
3	y – Milwaukee Bucks *	46	26	.639	3.0	72
4	x – New York Knicks	41	31	.569	8.0	72
5	y – Atlanta Hawks *	41	31	.569	8.0	72
6	x – Miami Heat	40	32	.556	9.0	72
7	x – Boston Celtics	36	36	.500	13.0	72
8	x – Washington Wizards	34	38	.472	15.0	72
9	pi – Indiana Pacers	34	38	.472	15.0	72
10	pi – Charlotte Hornets	33	39	.458	16.0	72
11	Chicago Bulls	31	41	.431	18.0	72
12	Toronto Raptors	27	45	.375	22.0	72
13	Cleveland Cavaliers	22	50	.306	27.0	72
14	Orlando Magic	21	51	.292	28.0	72
15	Detroit Pistons	20	52	.278	29.0	72

Notes

- z – Clinched home court advantage for the entire playoffs
- c – Clinched home court advantage for the conference playoffs
- y – Clinched division title
- x – Clinched playoff spot
- pb – Clinched play-in spot
- o – Eliminated from playoff contention
- * – Division leader

== Game log ==
=== Preseason ===
2020 preseason game log
Total: 2–0 (home: 1–0; road: 1–0)
Preseason: 2–0 (home: 1–0; road: 1–0)

Game	Date	Team	Score	High points	High rebounds	High assists	Location Attendance	Record
1	December 15	Boston	W 108–99	Shake Milton (19)	Tobias Harris (9)	Ben Simmons (6)	Wells Fargo Center; 0	1–0
2	December 18	@ Indiana	W 113–107	Shake Milton (15)	Tony Bradley (6)	Ben Simmons (8)	Bankers Life Fieldhouse; 0	2–0

2020–21 pre-season schedule

=== Regular season ===
2020–21 game log
Total: 49–23 (home: 29–7; road: 20–16)
December: 4–1 (home: 2–0; road: 2–1)

Game	Date	Team	Score	High points	High rebounds	High assists	Location Attendance	Record
1	December 23	Washington	W 113–107	Joel Embiid (29)	Joel Embiid (14)	Ben Simmons (7)	Wells Fargo Center; 0	1–0
2	December 26	@ New York	W 109–89	Joel Embiid (27)	Joel Embiid (10)	Ben Simmons (6)	Madison Square Garden; 0	2–0
3	December 27	@ Cleveland	L 94–118	Tobias Harris (16)	Tobias Harris (9)	Tobias Harris (5)	Rocket Mortgage FieldHouse; 300	2–1
4	December 29	Toronto	W 100–93	Joel Embiid (29)	Joel Embiid (16)	Ben Simmons (7)	Wells Fargo Center; 0	3–1
5	December 31	@ Orlando	W 116–92	Joel Embiid (21)	Ben Simmons (10)	Ben Simmons (8)	Amway Center; 3,247	4–1

January: 11–5 (home: 8–1; road: 3–4)

Game	Date	Team	Score	High points	High rebounds	High assists	Location Attendance	Record
6	January 2	Charlotte	W 127–102	Tobias Harris (24)	Joel Embiid (14)	Ben Simmons (11)	Wells Fargo Center; 0	5–1
7	January 4	Charlotte	W 118–101	Tobias Harris (22)	Dwight Howard (13)	Ben Simmons (6)	Wells Fargo Center; 0	6–1
8	January 6	Washington	W 141–136	Joel Embiid (38)	Joel Embiid (8)	Ben Simmons (12)	Wells Fargo Center; 0	7–1
9	January 7	@ Brooklyn	L 109–122	Shake Milton (24)	Joel Embiid (12)	Shake Milton (7)	Barclays Center; 0	7–2
10	January 9	Denver	L 103–115	Tyrese Maxey (39)	Tony Bradley (15)	Tyrese Maxey (6)	Wells Fargo Center; 0	7–3
11	January 11	@ Atlanta	L 94–112	Joel Embiid (24)	Joel Embiid (11)	Isaiah Joe (4)	State Farm Arena; 0	7–4
12	January 12	Miami	W 137–134 (OT)	Joel Embiid (45)	Joel Embiid (16)	Ben Simmons (12)	Wells Fargo Center; 0	8–4
13	January 14	Miami	W 125–108	Shake Milton (31)	Ben Simmons (10)	Ben Simmons (12)	Wells Fargo Center; 0	9–4
14	January 16	@ Memphis	L 104–106	Shake Milton (28)	Dwight Howard (18)	Ben Simmons (9)	FedEx Forum; 206	9–5
-	January 17	@ Oklahoma City	Postponed (COVID-19) (Makeup date: April 10)					
15	January 20	Boston	W 117–109	Joel Embiid (42)	Joel Embiid (10)	Ben Simmons (8)	Wells Fargo Center; 0	10–5
16	January 22	Boston	W 122–110	Joel Embiid (38)	Dwight Howard (12)	Ben Simmons (11)	Wells Fargo Center; 0	11–5
17	January 23	@ Detroit	W 114–110	Joel Embiid (33)	Joel Embiid (14)	Ben Simmons (10)	Little Caesars Arena; 0	12–5
18	January 25	@ Detroit	L 104–119	Tobias Harris (25)	Tony Bradley (9)	Ben Simmons (4)	Little Caesars Arena; 0	12–6
19	January 27	L. A. Lakers	W 107–106	Joel Embiid (28)	Ben Simmons (11)	Ben Simmons (10)	Wells Fargo Center; 0	13–6
20	January 29	@ Minnesota	W 118–94	Joel Embiid (37)	Joel Embiid (11)	Ben Simmons (7)	Target Center; 0	14–6
21	January 31	@ Indiana	W 119–110	Tobias Harris (27)	Dwight Howard (15)	Ben Simmons (7)	Bankers Life Fieldhouse; 0	15–6

February: 7–6 (home: 4–2; road: 3–4)

Game	Date	Team	Score	High points	High rebounds	High assists	Location Attendance	Record
22	February 3	@ Charlotte	W 118–111	Joel Embiid (34)	Joel Embiid (11)	Ben Simmons (9)	Spectrum Center; 0	16–6
23	February 4	Portland	L 105–121	Joel Embiid (34)	Tobias Harris (11)	Tobias Harris (5)	Wells Fargo Center; 0	16–7
24	February 6	Brooklyn	W 124–108	Joel Embiid (33)	Tobias Harris (12)	Ben Simmons (8)	Wells Fargo Center; 0	17–7
25	February 9	@ Sacramento	W 119–111	Joel Embiid (25)	Joel Embiid (17)	Ben Simmons (9)	Golden 1 Center; 0	18–7
26	February 11	@ Portland	L 114–118	Joel Embiid (35)	Ben Simmons (11)	Ben Simmons (9)	Moda Center; 0	18–8
27	February 13	@ Phoenix	L 111–120	Joel Embiid (25)	Joel Embiid (17)	Ben Simmons (9)	Phoenix Suns Arena; 1,652	18–9
28	February 15	@ Utah	L 120–134	Ben Simmons (42)	Dwight Howard (12)	Ben Simmons (12)	Vivint Arena; 3.902	18–10
29	February 17	Houston	W 118–113	Joel Embiid (31)	Tobias Harris (15)	Joel Embiid (9)	Wells Fargo Center; 0	19–10
30	February 19	Chicago	W 112–105	Joel Embiid (50)	Joel Embiid (17)	Tobias Harris (7)	Wells Fargo Center; 0	20–10
31	February 21	@ Toronto	L 103–110	Ben Simmons (28)	Joel Embiid (17)	Tobias Harris (7)	Amalie Arena; 0	20–11
32	February 23	@ Toronto	W 109–102	Tobias Harris (23)	Joel Embiid (12)	Ben Simmons (7)	Amalie Arena; 0	21–11
33	February 25	Dallas	W 111–97	Joel Embiid (23)	Joel Embiid (9)	Ben Simmons (7)	Wells Fargo Center; 0	22–11
34	February 27	Cleveland	L 109–112	Joel Embiid (42)	Joel Embiid (13)	Ben Simmons (8)	Wells Fargo Center; 0	22–12

March: 10–3 (home: 5–1; road: 5–2)

Game	Date	Team	Score	High points	High rebounds	High assists	Location Attendance	Record
35	March 1	Indiana	W 130–114	Shake Milton (26)	Joel Embiid (13)	Curry, Embiid, Maxey (5)	Wells Fargo Center; 0	23–12
36	March 3	Utah	W 131–123	Joel Embiid (40)	Joel Embiid (19)	Ben Simmons (6)	Wells Fargo Center; 0	24–12
37	March 11	@ Chicago	W 127–105	Tobias Harris (24)	Dwight Howard (12)	Seth Curry (7)	United Center; 0	25–12
38	March 12	@ Washington	W 127–101	Joel Embiid (23)	Dwight Howard (10)	Danny Green, Milton (4)	Capital One Arena; 0	26–12
39	March 14	San Antonio	W 134–99	Tobias Harris (23)	Tobias Harris (9)	Ben Simmons (9)	Wells Fargo Center; 3,071	27–12
40	March 16	New York	W 99–96	Tobias Harris (30)	Ben Simmons (13)	Ben Simmons (7)	Wells Fargo Center; 3,071	28–12
41	March 17	Milwaukee	L 105–109	Tobias Harris (19)	Dwight Howard (15)	Ben Simmons (12)	Wells Fargo Center; 3,071	28–13
42	March 20	Sacramento	W 129–105	Tobias Harris (29)	Dwight Howard (13)	Tobias Harris (8)	Wells Fargo Center; 3,071	29–13
43	March 21	@ New York	W 101–100 (OT)	Shake Milton (21)	Dwight Howard (13)	Harris, Simmons (4)	Madison Square Garden; 1,981	30–13
44	March 23	@ Golden State	W 108–98	Tobias Harris (25)	Harris, Howard (13)	Harris, Milton, Simmons (4)	Chase Center; 0	31–13
45	March 25	@ L. A. Lakers	W 109–101	Danny Green (28)	Simmons, Thybulle (7)	Ben Simmons (12)	Staples Center; 0	32–13
46	March 27	@ L. A. Clippers	L 112–122	Tobias Harris (29)	Dwight Howard (11)	Tobias Harris (6)	Staples Center; 0	32–14
47	March 30	@ Denver	L 95–104	Tyrese Maxey (13)	Howard, Scott (7)	Shake Milton (4)	Ball Arena; 3,574	32–15

April: 10–6 (home: 6–3; road: 4–3)

Game	Date	Team	Score	High points	High rebounds	High assists	Location Attendance	Record
48	April 1	@ Cleveland	W 114–94	Shake Milton (27)	Dwight Howard (15)	Ben Simmons (5)	Rocket Mortgage FieldHouse; 4,100	33–15
49	April 3	Minnesota	W 122–113	Tobias Harris (32)	Ben Simmons (8)	Ben Simmons (6)	Wells Fargo Center; 3,071	34–15
50	April 4	Memphis	L 100–116	Tobias Harris (21)	Dwight Howard (12)	Ben Simmons (4)	Wells Fargo Center; 4,094	34–16
51	April 6	@ Boston	W 106–96	Joel Embiid (35)	Dwight Howard (9)	Ben Simmons (6)	TD Garden; 2,298	35–16
52	April 9	@ New Orleans	L 94–101	Tobias Harris (23)	Embiid, Simmons (9)	Ben Simmons (6)	Smoothie King Center; 3,700	35–17
53	April 10	@ Oklahoma City	W 117–93	Joel Embiid (27)	Dwight Howard (13)	Seth Curry (6)	Chesapeake Energy Arena; 0	36–17
54	April 12	@ Dallas	W 113–95	Joel Embiid (36)	Embiid, Howard (7)	Ben Simmons (7)	American Airlines Center; 4,016	37–17
55	April 14	Brooklyn	W 123–117	Joel Embiid (39)	Joel Embiid (13)	Ben Simmons (9)	Wells Fargo Center; 4,094	38–17
56	April 16	L. A. Clippers	W 106–103	Joel Embiid (36)	Joel Embiid (14)	Ben Simmons (6)	Wells Fargo Center; 4,094	39–17
57	April 19	Golden State	L 96–107	Joel Embiid (28)	Joel Embiid (13)	Joel Embiid (8)	Wells Fargo Center; 4,094	39–18
58	April 21	Phoenix	L 113–116	Joel Embiid (38)	Joel Embiid (17)	Embiid, Green (4)	Wells Fargo Center; 4,094	39–19
59	April 22	@ Milwaukee	L 117–124	Joel Embiid (24)	Dwight Howard (7)	Tobias Harris (6)	Fiserv Forum; 3,280	39–20
60	April 24	@ Milwaukee	L 94–132	Maxey, Milton (15)	Dwight Howard (12)	Shake Milton (3)	Fiserv Forum; 3,280	39–21
61	April 26	Oklahoma City	W 121–90	Joel Embiid (21)	Dwight Howard (11)	Harris, Maxey, Simmons (4)	Wells Fargo Center; 4,094	40–21
62	April 28	Atlanta	W 127–83	Seth Curry (20)	Embiid, Maxey (7)	Harris, Milton, Simmons (6)	Wells Fargo Center; 4,094	41–21
63	April 30	Atlanta	W 126–104	Dwight Howard (19)	Dwight Howard (11)	Simmons, Thybulle (5)	Wells Fargo Center; 4,094	42–21

May: 7–2 (home: 4–0; road: 3–2)

Game	Date	Team	Score	High points	High rebounds	High assists	Location Attendance	Record
64	May 2	@ San Antonio	W 113–111 (OT)	Joel Embiid (34)	Joel Embiid (12)	Harris, Simmons (5)	AT&T Center; 3,978	43–21
65	May 3	@ Chicago	W 106–94	Tobias Harris (21)	Joel Embiid (10)	Ben Simmons (5)	United Center; 0	44–21
66	May 5	@ Houston	W 135–115	Joel Embiid (34)	Joel Embiid (12)	Tyrese Maxey (7)	Toyota Center; 3,583	45–21
67	May 7	New Orleans	W 109–107	Joel Embiid (37)	Joel Embiid (13)	Ben Simmons (10)	Wells Fargo Center; 5,119	46–21
68	May 8	Detroit	W 118–104	Joel Embiid (29)	Dwight Howard (14)	Green, Harris, Maxey, Milton (4)	Wells Fargo Center; 5,119	47–21
69	May 11	@ Indiana	L 94–103	Tobias Harris (27)	Ben Simmons (8)	Ben Simmons (7)	Bankers Life Fieldhouse; 0	47–22
70	May 13	@ Miami	L 94–106	Tobias Harris (21)	Dwight Howard (8)	Ben Simmons (7)	American Airlines Arena; 0	47–23
71	May 14	Orlando	W 122–97	Seth Curry (20)	Joel Embiid (11)	Ben Simmons (9)	Wells Fargo Center; 5,119	48–23
72	May 16	Orlando	W 128–117	Tyrese Maxey (30)	Paul Reed (12)	Shake Milton (9)	Wells Fargo Center; 5,119	49–23

2020–21 season schedule

=== Playoffs ===
2021 playoff game log
Total: 7–5 (home: 4–3; road: 3–2)
First Round: 4–1 (home: 3–0; road: 1–1)

Game	Date	Team	Score	High points	High rebounds	High assists	Location Attendance	Series
1	May 23	Washington	W 125–118	Tobias Harris (37)	Ben Simmons (15)	Ben Simmons (15)	Wells Fargo Center; 11,160	1–0
2	May 26	Washington	W 120–95	Embiid, Simmons (22)	Dwight Howard (11)	Ben Simmons (8)	Wells Fargo Center; 11,160	2–0
3	May 29	@ Washington	W 132–103	Joel Embiid (36)	Tobias Harris (13)	Ben Simmons (9)	Capital One Arena; 10,665	3–0
4	May 31	@ Washington	L 114–122	Tobias Harris (21)	Tobias Harris (13)	Tobias Harris (5)	Capital One Arena; 10,665	3–1
5	June 2	Washington	W 129–112	Seth Curry (30)	Ben Simmons (10)	Ben Simmons (11)	Wells Fargo Center; 15,523	4–1

Conference semifinals: 3–4 (home: 1–3; road: 2–1)

Game	Date	Team	Score	High points	High rebounds	High assists	Location Attendance	Series
1	June 6	Atlanta	L 124–128	Joel Embiid (39)	Tobias Harris (10)	Ben Simmons (10)	Wells Fargo Center; 18,624	0–1
2	June 8	Atlanta	W 118–102	Joel Embiid (40)	Joel Embiid (13)	Danny Green (8)	Wells Fargo Center; 18,624	1–1
3	June 11	@ Atlanta	W 127–111	Joel Embiid (27)	Joel Embiid (9)	Joel Embiid (8)	State Farm Arena; 16,432	2–1
4	June 14	@ Atlanta	L 100–103	Tobias Harris (20)	Joel Embiid (21)	Ben Simmons (9)	State Farm Arena; 16,502	2–2
5	June 16	Atlanta	L 106–109	Joel Embiid (37)	Joel Embiid (13)	Ben Simmons (9)	Wells Fargo Center; 18,624	2–3
6	June 18	@ Atlanta	W 104–99	Curry, Harris (24)	Joel Embiid (13)	Ben Simmons (5)	State Farm Arena; 16,610	3–3
7	June 20	Atlanta	L 96–103	Joel Embiid (31)	Tobias Harris (14)	Ben Simmons (13)	Wells Fargo Center; 18,624	3–4

2021 playoff schedule

== Player statistics ==
Legend
GP	Games played	GS	Games started	MPG	Minutes per game
FG%	Field-goal percentage	3P%	3-point field-goal percentage	FT%	Free-throw percentage
RPG	Rebounds per game	APG	Assists per game	SPG	Steals per game
BPG	Blocks per game	PPG	Points per game

=== Regular season ===
Player	GP	GS	MPG	FG%	3P%	FT%	RPG	APG	SPG	BPG	PPG
Danny Green	69	69	28.0	.412	.405	.775	3.8	1.7	1.3	.8	9.5
Dwight Howard	69	6	17.3	.587	.250	.576	8.4	.9	.4	.9	7.0
Matisse Thybulle	65	8	20.0	.420	.301	.444	1.9	1.0	1.6	1.1	3.9
Shake Milton	63	4	23.2	.450	.350	.830	2.3	3.1	.6	.3	13.0
Tobias Harris	62	62	32.5	.512	.394	.892	6.8	3.5	.9	.8	19.5
Tyrese Maxey	61	8	15.3	.462	.301	.871	1.7	2.0	.4	.2	8.0
Ben Simmons	58	58	32.4	.557	.300	.613	7.2	6.9	1.6	.6	14.3
Seth Curry	57	57	28.7	.467	.450	.896	2.4	2.7	.8	.1	12.5
Furkan Korkmaz	55	11	19.3	.401	.375	.732	2.1	1.5	.9	.2	9.1
Joel Embiid	51	51	31.1	.513	.377	.859	10.6	2.8	1.0	1.4	28.5
Mike Scott	51	12	16.7	.360	.342	.667	2.4	.8	.5	.3	4.2
Isaiah Joe	41	1	9.3	.361	.368	.750	.9	.5	.3	.1	3.7
Paul Reed	26	0	6.8	.538	.000	.500	2.3	.5	.4	.5	3.4
Tony Bradley^{†}	20	8	14.4	.680	.000	.636	5.2	.9	.3	.7	5.5
George Hill^{†}	16	3	18.9	.442	.391	.760	2.0	1.9	.7	.2	6.0
Rayjon Tucker	14	0	4.9	.500	.286	.737	.8	.4	.1	.0	2.4
Terrance Ferguson	13	0	3.8	.143	.000		.1	.2	.1	.0	.2
Anthony Tolliver	11	0	9.0	.235	.286	.833	.9	.2	.3	.2	1.5
Vincent Poirier	10	0	3.9	.250	.000	.333	1.4	.2	.0	.3	.8
Dakota Mathias	8	2	15.4	.396	.308	.333	.9	1.6	.1	.4	6.0
Mason Jones^{†}	6	0	4.5	.556	.500	.714	.7	.5	.2	.0	2.7
Gary Clark^{†}	2	0	6.5	.000			1.0	.5	.5	.0	.0
Ignas Brazdeikis^{†}	1	0	8.0	.000	.000		2.0	.0	.0	.0	.0

=== Playoffs ===
Player	GP	GS	MPG	FG%	3P%	FT%	RPG	APG	SPG	BPG	PPG
Tobias Harris	12	12	36.5	.488	.372	.875	8.5	3.5	1.0	.4	21.8
Ben Simmons	12	12	33.5	.621	.000	.342	7.9	8.8	1.3	.8	11.9
Seth Curry	12	12	31.8	.578	.506	.789	2.3	2.3	.8	.3	18.8
Furkan Korkmaz	12	4	16.3	.411	.318	.714	2.0	.6	.6	.3	7.0
Matisse Thybulle	12	1	18.3	.481	.324	.400	1.4	.3	1.3	.9	5.3
George Hill	12	0	17.1	.442	.421	.769	1.3	1.5	.7	.3	4.7
Tyrese Maxey	12	0	13.0	.439	.333	.636	1.8	1.3	.3	.5	6.3
Dwight Howard	12	0	12.4	.533	.000	.600	6.3	.7	.2	.5	4.7
Shake Milton	12	0	10.1	.319	.421	.933	.8	.8	.3	.1	4.3
Joel Embiid	11	11	32.5	.513	.390	.835	10.5	3.4	1.0	1.5	28.1
Danny Green	8	8	24.9	.438	.378		2.6	2.6	1.1	1.0	7.0
Mike Scott	5	0	6.8	.222	.286		.6	.6	.2	.2	1.2
Isaiah Joe	4	0	2.3	.333	.000		.0	.3	.0	.0	.5
Paul Reed	3	0	3.7	.500			2.7	.0	.0	.3	1.3
Rayjon Tucker	1	0	2.0			.500	.0	.0	.0	.0	1.0
Anthony Tolliver	1	0	2.0				.0	.0	.0	.0	.0

- ^{†} Denotes player spent time with another team in the season. Stats reflect time with the 76ers only.

== Transactions ==
=== Trades ===
November 18, 2020
To Philadelphia 76ers

Seth Curry
To Dallas Mavericks

Josh Richardson
- draft rights to Tyler Bey (#36)
November 23, 2020
To Philadelphia 76ers

Tony Bradley
To Detroit Pistons

Zhaire Smith
December 8, 2020
To Philadelphia 76ers

Terrance Ferguson

Danny Green

Vincent Poirier

To Oklahoma City Thunder

Al Horford
- rights to Théo Maledon (#34)
- rights to Vasilije Micić (2014 #52)
- 2025 PHI protected first-round pick
March 25, 2021
To Oklahoma City Thunder

Tony Bradley
- 2025 PHI second-round pick
- 2026 PHI second-round pick
To New York Knicks

Terrance Ferguson

Vincent Poirier

- rights to Emir Preldžić
- 2021 PHI second-round pick
- 2024 protected PHI second-round pick (from Miami)
To Philadelphia 76ers

George Hill

Ignas Brazdeikis

=== Free agency ===
==== Re-signed ====
Player	Signed
Ryan Broekhoff	November 27, 2020

==== Additions ====
Player	Signed	Former team
Dwight Howard	November 21, 2020	Los Angeles Lakers
Justin Anderson	November 27, 2020	Brooklyn Nets (substitute player contract)
Derrick Walton	November 27, 2020	Detroit Pistons
Lamine Diane	November 30, 2020	Cal State Northridge (undrafted in 2020)
Justin Robinson	December 6, 2020	Delaware Blue Coats (G League)
Frank Mason III	December 18, 2020	Wisconsin Herd (G League)
Dakota Mathias	December 3, 2020	Two-way contract
Mason Jones	March 26, 2021	Two-way contract

==== Subtractions ====
Player	Waived
Justin Anderson	December 19, 2020
Ryan Broekhoff	December 14, 2020
Derrick Walton	December 14, 2020
Lamine Diane	December 7, 2020
Justin Robinson	December 7, 2020
Frank Mason III	December 19, 2020
Dakota Mathias	January 18, 2021

== Awards ==
Recipient	Award	Date awarded	Ref.
Doc Rivers	Eastern Conference Coach of the Month (December/January)	February 1, 2021	
Joel Embiid	Eastern Conference Player of the Month (December/January)	February 2, 2021	
