= Frank Ntilikina =

French-Rwandan basketball player (born 1998)

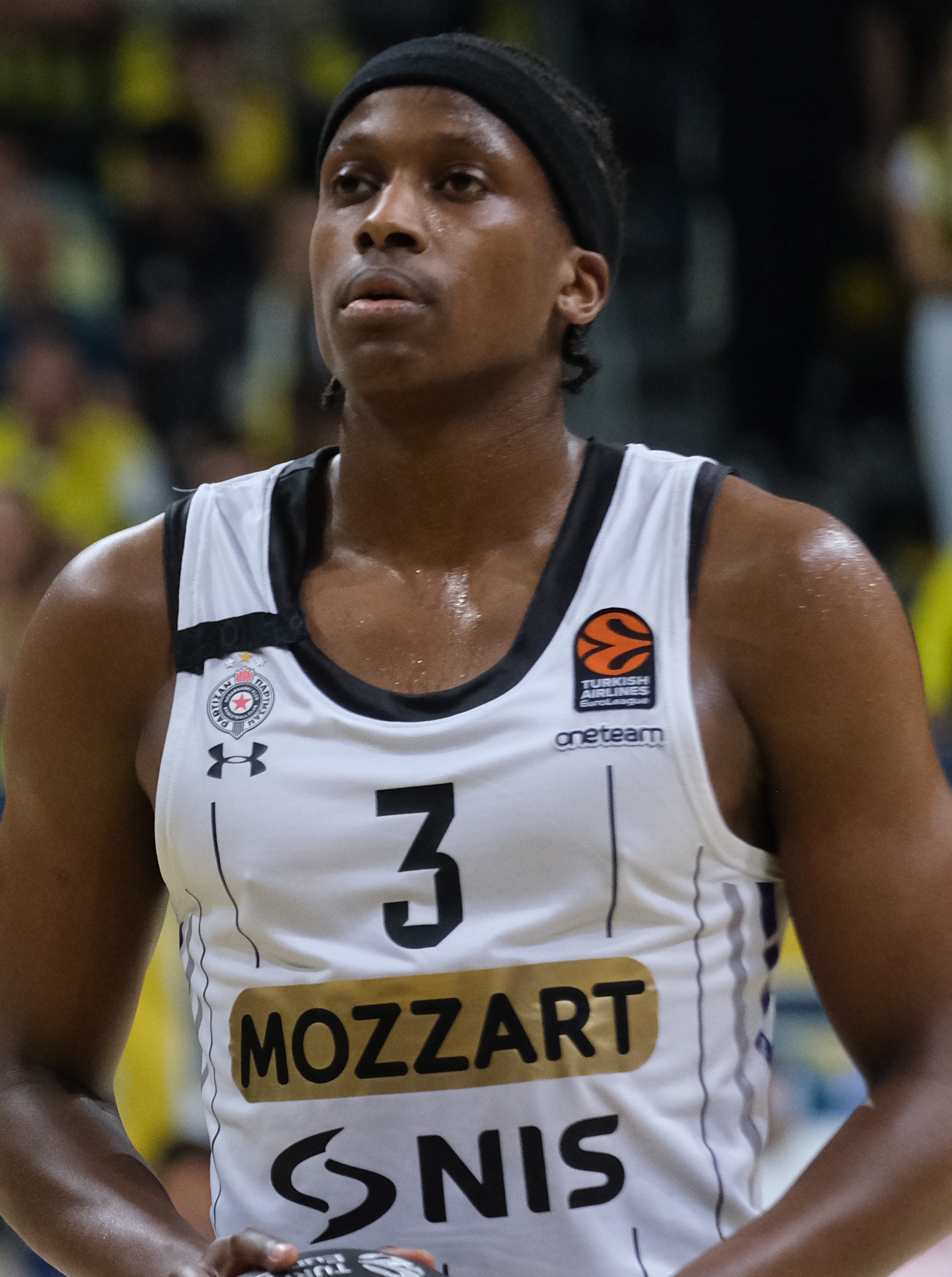
- Ntilikina with Partizan in 2024

No. 5 – Paris Basketball
- Position: Point guard
- League: LNB Élite; EuroLeague

Personal information
- Born: 28 July 1998 (age 28) Ixelles, Belgium
- Listed height: 6 ft 4 in (1.93 m)
- Listed weight: 200 lb (91 kg)

Career information
- NBA draft: 2017: 1st round, 8th overall pick
- Drafted by: New York Knicks
- Playing career: 2015–present

Career history
- 2015–2017: SIG Strasbourg
- 2017–2021: New York Knicks
- 2021–2023: Dallas Mavericks
- 2023–2024: Charlotte Hornets
- 2024–2025: Partizan
- 2025–2026: Olympiacos
- 2026–present: Paris Basketball

Career highlights
- EuroLeague champion (2026); ABA League champion (2025); Greek League champion (2026); Serbian League champion (2025); 2× Pro A Best Young Player (2016, 2017); FIBA Europe Under-18 Championship MVP (2016)
- Stats at NBA.com
- Stats at Basketball Reference
Medals
Men's basketball
Representing France
Summer Olympics
Silver medal – second place	2020 Tokyo	Team
Silver medal – second place	2024 Paris	Team
FIBA World Cup
Bronze medal – third place	2019 China
Europe U-18 Championship
Gold medal – first place	2016 Turkey	U-18 team
Europe U-16 Championship
Gold medal – first place	2014 Latvia	U-16 team

Frank Bryan Ntilikina (/ˌniːliːˈkiːnə/ NEE-lee-KEE-nə; French: [fʁɑ̃ŋk nilikina]; born 28 July 1998) is a French-Rwandan professional basketball player for Paris Basketball of the French LNB Élite and the EuroLeague. Ntilikina stands at 6 ft 4 in (1.93 m) tall and plays the point guard position. He was selected by the New York Knicks as the eighth overall pick during the 2017 NBA draft.

== Early life ==
Ntilikina was born in Ixelles, Belgium, on 28 July 1998, to Rwandan parents. His mother, Jacqueline Mukarugema, had fled Rwanda with his two brothers because of the Rwandan Civil War and settled in Belgium a few years before his birth. Ntilikina moved to Strasbourg, France at age three. He subsequently holds both French and Rwandan citizenship. He began his youth club career at the age of five, playing for St-Joseph Strasbourg, before making the move to Strasbourg IG's youth academy when he was 15.

Ntilikina participated in the 2014 Jordan Brand Classic International Game, tallying six points, three rebounds and one assist in 23 minutes off the bench. Two years later, he attended the "Basketball Without Borders Global Camp" in Toronto, Canada, during the 2016 NBA All-Star Weekend.

== Professional career ==
=== SIG Strasbourg (2015–2017) ===
Ntilikina spent the majority of the 2014–15 season with the Strasbourg IG youth team, helping them win the French Youth League Championship. He made his debut for the SIG senior team on 4 April 2015 in a French LNB Pro A 2014–15 season contest against Boulogne-sur-Mer, seeing 15 minutes of action.

On 15 October 2015, Ntilikina logged his first EuroLeague minutes, scoring one point in 12 minutes and 16 seconds of play against KK Crvena zvezda. In December 2015, he signed a four-year contract with SIG Strasbourg. He saw the court in 32 contests during the 2015–16 Pro A season, averaging 1.2 points per game and earning the LNB Pro A Best Young Player award. In the 2016–17 season, Ntilikina became a key part of the Strasbourg team, as he appeared in 45 games for the team while averaging 7.2 points, 1.9 rebounds, and 2.1 assists in 19.3 minutes per game. His successful campaign led him to winning his second straight Pro A Best Young Player award.

In April 2017, Ntilikina entered his name into the 2017 NBA draft. By NBA draft's entry deadline on 12 June, he became one of only 10 international underclassmen to remain in the NBA draft that year. Ntilikina also became one of 20 invitees for the green room on draft night. The night before the draft, Ntilikina played game 4 in the LNB Pro A Finals with SIG Strasbourg before traveling to Brooklyn, New York to participate in the draft personally. After that night, he played his last game with SIG Strasbourg with them losing the LNB Pro A Finals to Élan Chalon.

=== New York Knicks (2017–2021) ===
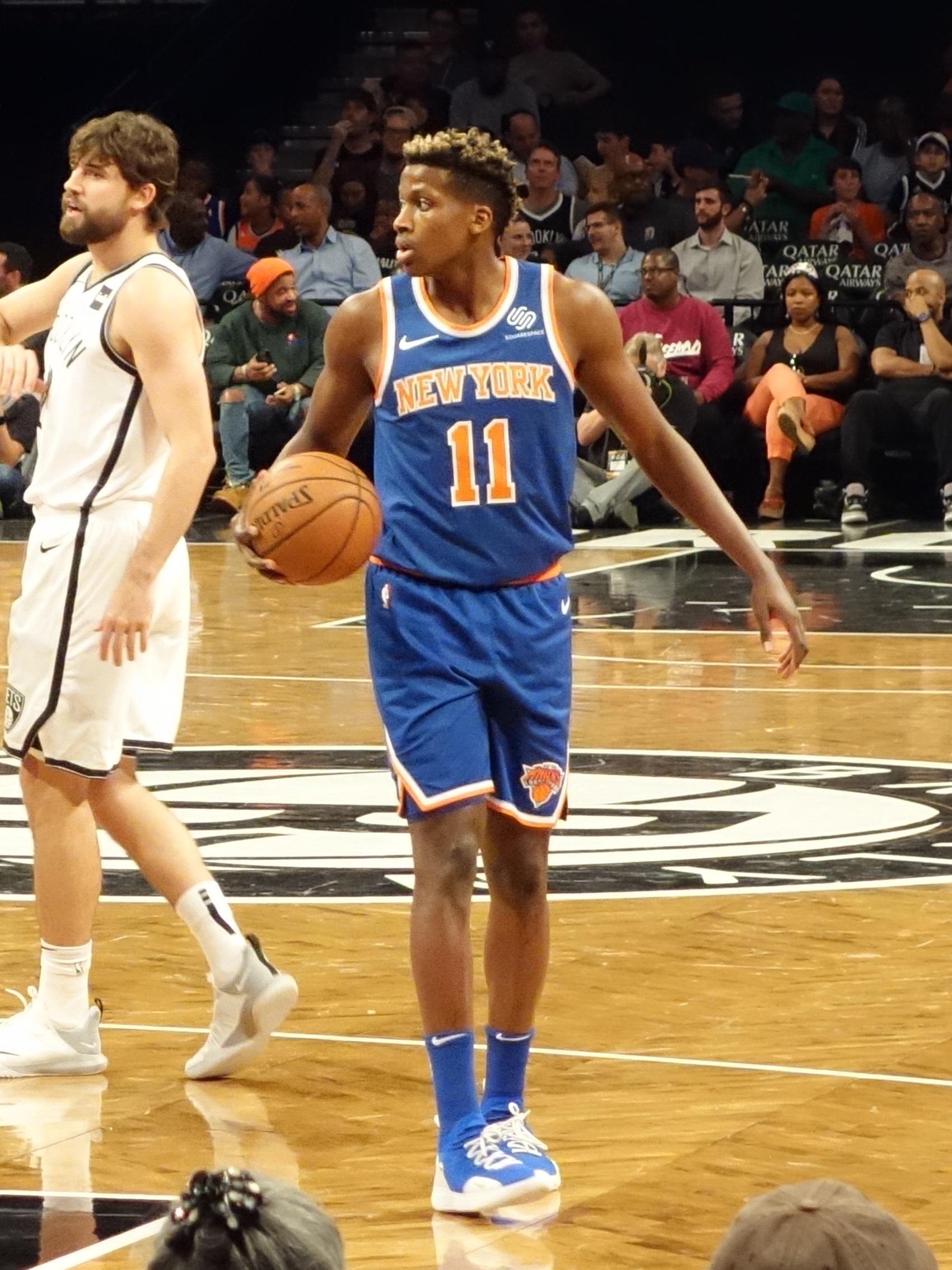
Ntilikina with the New York Knicks in 2018

During the build-up to the 2017 NBA draft, there was heavy speculation that the Dallas Mavericks would select Ntilikina with the ninth overall pick. Mavericks owner Mark Cuban was quoted as saying that the Mavericks wanted a "pass-first point guard" and said "We can maybe go a little bit more for a project", both of which Ntilikina fit the bill for. When the Knicks ended taking Ntilikina with the eighth pick, the Mavericks chose point guard Dennis Smith Jr. Ntilikina was also rumoured to be coveted by the Knicks' front office and coaching staff, with whom he met in person.

On 22 June 2017, Ntilikina was selected by the New York Knicks with the eighth pick in the 2017 NBA draft. On 5 July, Ntilikina signed with the Knicks. He was the second-youngest active player in the NBA during his rookie year behind Ike Anigbogu. Ntilikina made his NBA debut on 19 October 2017, in a 105–84 loss to the Oklahoma City Thunder. He scored his first points on 28 October against the Brooklyn Nets in a 107–86 win. He recorded nine points, two rebounds, five assists and a steal during the Knicks' home opener. On 15 January 2018, Ntilikina recorded his first double-double with 10 points, 10 assists, seven rebounds, two blocks and a steal in a 119–104 win over the Brooklyn Nets. On 24 January 2018, he was selected to represent Team World for the Rising Stars Challenge during the 2018 NBA All-Star Weekend. His rookie season in New York was considered by many as underwhelming, and he was often claimed to be a draft bust.

Ntilkina was limited to 43 games in his second season due to injuries.

Heading into his third season, Ntilikina was coming off a strong performance in the 2019 FIBA Basketball World Cup. In the early part of the season, he took over starting point guard duties and began to show great signs of defense. On 23 November 2019, Ntilikina racked up six steals in a 111–104 loss to San Antonio Spurs. However, like his previous two seasons, he struggled to shoot the ball and eventually was demoted in favor of Elfrid Payton.

=== Dallas Mavericks (2021–2023) ===
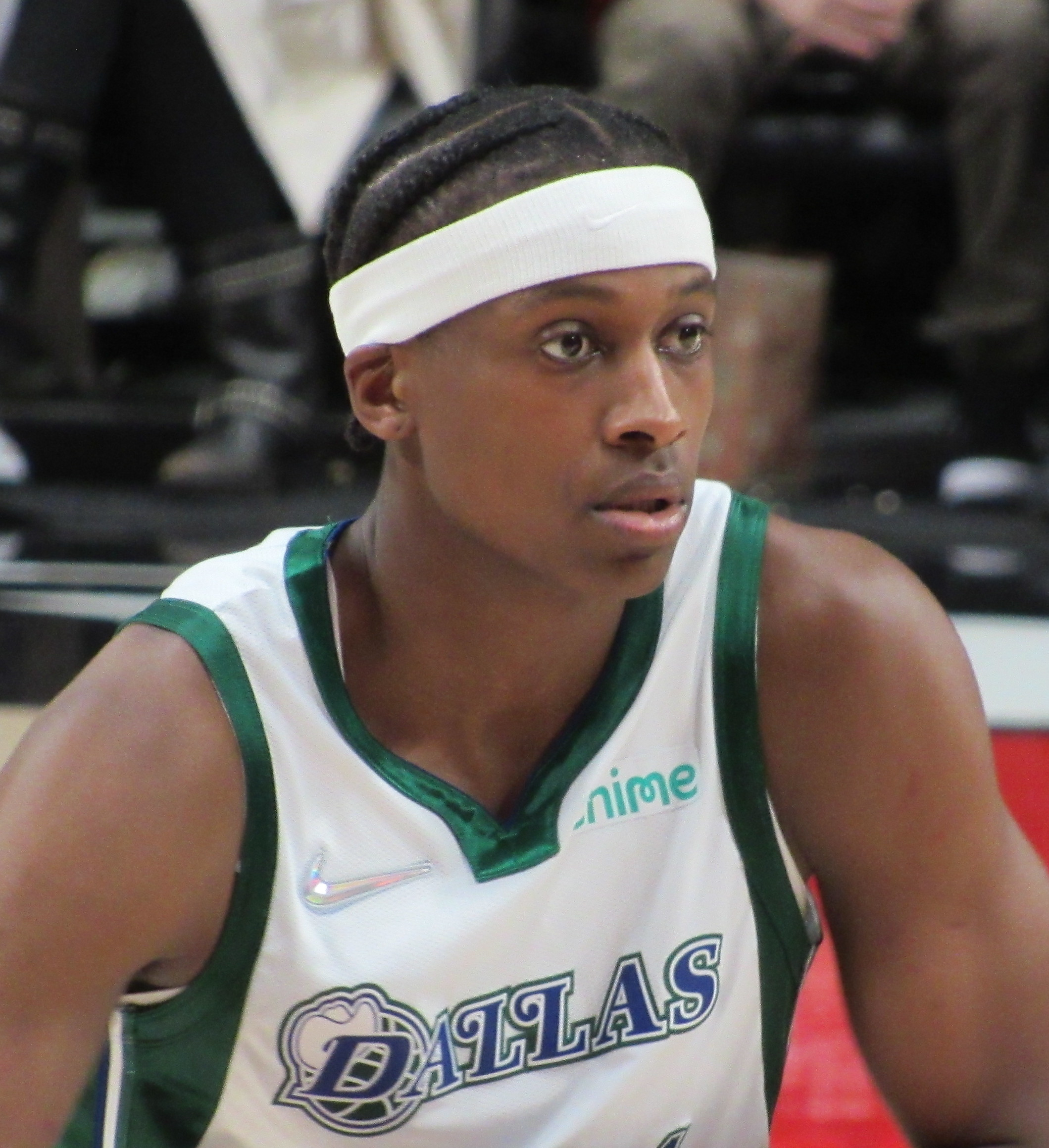
Ntilikina with the Dallas Mavericks in 2021

On 16 September 2021, Ntilikina signed with the Dallas Mavericks. He made his debut on 21 October 2021, in a 87–113 loss to the Atlanta Hawks, playing four minutes.

=== Charlotte Hornets (2023–2024) ===
On 5 August 2023, Ntilikina signed with the Charlotte Hornets.

On 8 February 2024, Ntilikina was waived by the Hornets.

=== Partizan (2024–2025) ===
On 20 June 2024, Ntilikina signed a two-year contract with KK Partizan of the Basketball League of Serbia (KLS), ABA League and EuroLeague. He helped Partizan win the 2024–25 ABA League championship and the 2024–25 Serbian League championship. In 29 ABA League games, he averaged 7.1 points, 1.4 rebounds and 1.8 assists per game, and in 21 EuroLeague games, he averaged 7.0 points, 1.7 rebounds and 2.0 assists per game.

On 1 September 2025, it was reported that Ntilikina had extended his deal with Partizan until 2027, but he ultimately parted ways with the team later that month.

=== Olympiacos (2025–2026) ===
On 26 September 2025, Ntilikina signed a contract with Olympiacos of the Greek Basket League (GBL) and EuroLeague. During his stint with Olympiacos, he won the 2025–26 EuroLeague title as well as the Greek League championship.

=== Paris Basketball (2026–present) ===
On 12 August 2026, Ntilikina signed with Paris Basketball of the French LNB Élite and the EuroLeague.

== National team career ==
Ntilikina averaged 7.4 points, 2.0 assists, 1.6 rebounds and one steal per game, en route to winning the 2014 FIBA Europe Under-16 Championship with the Under-16 French junior national team.

He was spectacular in helping France's Under-18 national team win the 2016 FIBA Europe Under-18 Championship, scoring 31 points, including 7-for-10 from three-point range, in the championship game against the Under-18 Lithuanian team. He averaged 15.2 points, 4.5 assists, 2.8 rebounds and 2.2 steals a game in the tournament, draining 50 percent of his field goal attempts, including 58.6 percent of his shots from long distance, en route to most valuable player honors.

Ntilikina dished out a game-high eight assists, to go along with 13 points and four rebounds, at the FIBA European Under-18 All-Star Game, in September 2015.

He helped France win a bronze medal in the 2019 FIBA Basketball World Cup.

Ntilikina competed for France at the 2020 and 2024 Summer Olympics.

== Career statistics ==
Legend
GP	Games played	GS	Games started	MPG	Minutes per game
FG%	Field-goal percentage	3P%	3-point field-goal percentage	FT%	Free-throw percentage
RPG	Rebounds per game	APG	Assists per game	SPG	Steals per game
BPG	Blocks per game	PPG	Points per game	PIR	Performance index rating
**Bold**	Career high

=== EuroLeague ===
Year	Team	GP	GS	MPG	FG%	3P%	FT%	RPG	APG	SPG	BPG	PPG	PIR
2024–25	Partizan	21	7	19.9	.458	.377	.923	1.7	2.0	.6	.0	7.0	6.1
Career		21	7	19.9	.458	.377	.923	1.7	2.0	.6	.0	7.0	6.1

=== NBA ===
==== Regular season ====
Year	Team	GP	GS	MPG	FG%	3P%	FT%	RPG	APG	SPG	BPG	PPG
2017–18	New York	**78**	9	**21.9**	.364	.318	.721	**2.3**	**3.2**	.8	.2	5.9
2018–19	New York	43	16	21.0	.337	.287	.767	2.0	2.8	.7	**.3**	5.7
2019–20	New York	57	**26**	20.8	.393	.321	.864	2.1	3.0	**.9**	.3	**6.3**
2020–21	New York	33	4	9.8	.367	**.479**	.444	.9	.6	.5	.1	2.7
2021–22	Dallas	58	5	11.8	**.399**	.342	.960	1.4	1.2	.5	.1	4.1
2022–23	Dallas	47	5	12.9	.364	.254	.667	1.3	1.2	.3	.1	2.9
2023–24	Charlotte	5	0	8.6	.111	.125	**1.000**	1.2	.8	.0	.0	1.0
Career		321	65	17.0	.369	.320	.762	1.8	2.2	.7	.2	4.8

==== Playoffs ====
Year	Team	GP	GS	MPG	FG%	3P%	FT%	RPG	APG	SPG	BPG	PPG
2021	New York	3	0	1.3	.000	.000	—	.0	.0	.0	.0	.0
2022	Dallas	**12**	0	**10.3**	**.333**	**.300**	**1.000**	**1.0**	**.8**	**.7**	**.1**	**1.9**
Career		15	0	8.5	.320	.286	1.000	.8	.6	.5	.1	1.5
