= Kevin Knox II =

American basketball player (born 1999)

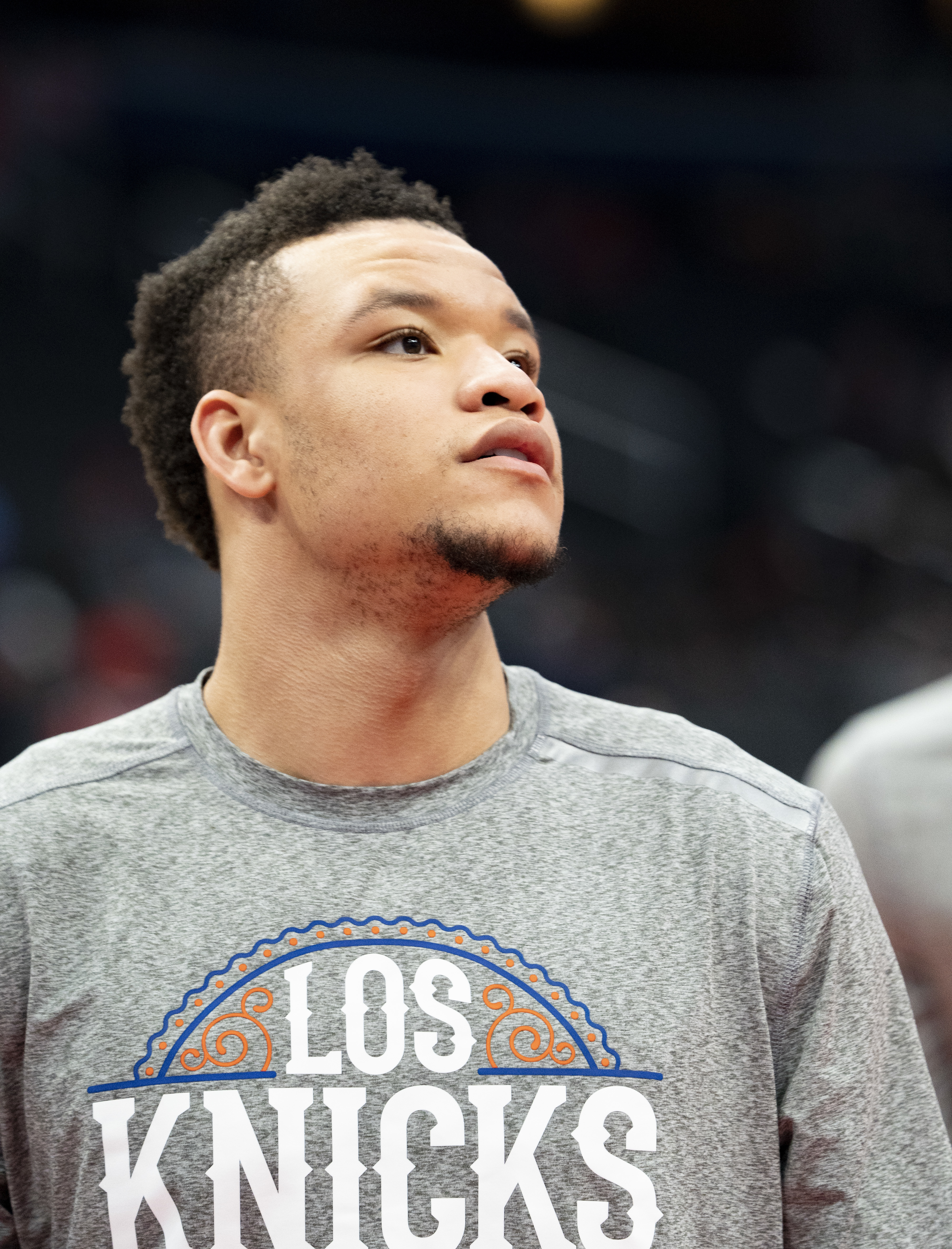
- Knox with the New York Knicks in 2020

No. 11 – Unicaja Málaga
- Position: Power forward / small forward
- League: Liga ACB; BCL

Personal information
- Born: August 11, 1999 (age 27) Phoenix, Arizona, U.S.
- Listed height: 6 ft 8 in (2.03 m)
- Listed weight: 215 lb (98 kg)

Career information
- High school: Tampa Catholic (Tampa, Florida)
- College: Kentucky (2017–2018)
- NBA draft: 2018: 1st round, 9th overall pick
- Drafted by: New York Knicks
- Playing career: 2018–present

Career history
- 2018–2022: New York Knicks
- 2022: Atlanta Hawks
- 2022–2023: Detroit Pistons
- 2023: Portland Trail Blazers
- 2023–2024: Detroit Pistons
- 2024: Rip City Remix
- 2024–2025: Santa Cruz Warriors
- 2025: Golden State Warriors
- 2025–2026: Windy City Bulls
- 2026–present: Unicaja Málaga

Career highlights
- First-team All-SEC (2018); SEC Freshman of the Year (2018); McDonald's All-American (2017); Florida Mr. Basketball (2017)
- Stats at NBA.com
- Stats at Basketball Reference
Medals
Men's basketball
Representing the United States
FIBA Americas U16 Championship
Gold medal – first place	2015 Argentina	National team
FIBA U17 World Championship
Gold medal – first place	2016 Spain	National team

Kevin Devon Knox II (born August 11, 1999) is an American professional basketball player for Unicaja Málaga of the Liga ACB and the Basketball Champions League (BCL). He played college basketball for the Kentucky Wildcats. Knox was selected ninth overall by the New York Knicks in the 2018 NBA draft.

== High school career ==
Knox attended Tampa Catholic High School in Tampa, Florida. As a junior, he averaged 30.1 points per game, 11.2 rebounds per game, and 2.4 assists while leading the Crusaders to regional and district championships and runner-up to the 2016 Florida Class 4A semifinals. In the 2016 summer, he joined his AAU team, E1T1 United on the Nike Elite Youth Basketball League (EYBL) Circuit. On May 14, 2016, Knox scored career high 28 points in a win against All Ohio Red. He averaged 19.6 points per game and 7.6 rebounds per game on the EYBL circuit. As a senior, Knox averaged 28.5 points per game and 11.3 rebounds per game leading Tampa Catholic to a (25–6) record. He played in the McDonald's All-American Game and Jordan Brand Classic.

=== Recruiting ===
He was a five-star recruit and was regarded as one of the top players in the 2017 class. On May 6, 2017, Knox committed to play basketball at the University of Kentucky, spurning offers from Duke, Florida State, Missouri and North Carolina.

College recruiting
Name	Hometown	School	Height	Weight	Commit date
Kevin Knox II; SF	Miami, Florida	Tampa Catholic High School	6 ft 8 in (2.03 m)	205 lb (93 kg)	Jun 5, 2017
Kevin Knox II; SF	Recruit ratings: Scout: Rivals: 247Sports: ESPN: (95)				
Overall recruit ranking: Scout: #7 Rivals: #9 247Sports: #8 ESPN: #7
Note: In many cases, Scout, Rivals, 247Sports, On3, and ESPN may conflict in their listings of height and weight.; In these cases, the average was taken. ESPN grades are on a 100-point scale.; Sources: "2017 Team Ranking". Rivals.

== College career ==
In his freshman season, Knox led the Wildcats to a 10–8 conference record, finishing fourth in the SEC, and led the team with 15.9 points per game. He was named to the All-Rookie and First Team All-SEC teams. The team turned their fortunes around in time to win the SEC tournament, with Knox totaling 18 points and 7 rebounds in the final game against Tennessee. In the 2018 NCAA men's basketball tournament with Virginia losing to Maryland–Baltimore County, Cincinnati losing to Nevada, Tennessee losing to Loyola-Chicago, and Buffalo beating Arizona, Kentucky was considered to have an easier path to the Final Four but Kansas State beat them, with Kevin Knox posting 13 points and 8 rebounds.

On April 6, 2018, Knox declared for the 2018 NBA draft and hired an agent, forgoing his final three years of college eligibility.

== Professional career ==
=== New York Knicks (2018–2022) ===
Knox was selected with the ninth overall pick by the New York Knicks in the 2018 NBA draft. On July 5, 2018, the Knicks announced that they had signed Knox. On October 17, he made his NBA debut, coming off the bench in a 126–107 win over the Atlanta Hawks with ten points, two steals and a block. Two days later, Knox scored team-high 17 points with six rebounds in a 107–105 loss to the Brooklyn Nets. One day later, he sprained his left ankle in a 103–101 loss to the Boston Celtics. Knox returned to action and on December 1, scoring a career-high 26 points with four rebounds, four assists, a steal and a block in a 136–134 overtime win over the Milwaukee Bucks. In January 2019, Knox received the Eastern Conference's NBA Rookie of the Month Award for games played in December 2018. On January 13, 2019, he scored a career-high 31 points with seven rebounds, and two steals in a 108–105 loss to the Philadelphia 76ers.

On December 21, 2019, Knox recorded a season-high 19 points, alongside four rebounds, two steals and three blocks, in a 123–102 loss to the Milwaukee Bucks. Knox's percentages dropped during his sophomore season, as he only played 17.9 minutes per game whilst averaging 6.4 points per game.

On December 21, 2020, the Knicks announced that they exercised their fourth-year option on Knox. On January 11, 2021, Knox scored a season-high 19 points, alongside five rebounds and two assists, in a 109–88 loss to the Charlotte Hornets. During the 2020–21 regular season, the Knicks finished with a 41–31 record and qualified for the playoffs for the first time since 2013. The Knicks faced the Atlanta Hawks during their first-round series. Knox made his playoff debut on May 30, 2021, scoring two points in a 113–96 game 4 loss. The Knicks ended up losing the series in five games.

On December 12, 2021, Knox scored a season-high 18 points, alongside five rebounds, in a 112–97 loss to the Milwaukee Bucks.

=== Atlanta Hawks (2022) ===
On January 13, 2022, the Knicks traded Knox and a protected future first-round pick to the Atlanta Hawks in exchange for future teammate Cam Reddish, Solomon Hill, a 2025 second-round pick and cash considerations. Knox made his Hawks debut on January 19, scoring two points in a 134–122 win over the Minnesota Timberwolves. The Hawks qualified for the postseason and faced the Miami Heat during their first-round series. On April 17, Knox scored a playoff career-high 10 points, alongside two rebounds, in a 115–91 game 1 loss. He surpassed this total on April 24, scoring 12 points in a 110–86 game 4 loss. The Hawks ended up losing the series in five games.

=== Detroit Pistons (2022–2023) ===
On August 1, 2022, Knox signed with the Detroit Pistons. He made his Pistons debut on October 19, recording three points and three rebounds in a 113–109 win over the Orlando Magic. On November 23, Knox scored a season-high 21 points, alongside three rebounds and a career-high six 3-pointers, in a 125–116 win over the Utah Jazz. Knox made 42 appearances (including one start) for Detroit during the 2022–23 NBA season, recording averages of 5.6 points, 2.6 rebounds, and 0.4 assists.

=== Portland Trail Blazers (2023) ===
On February 9, 2023, Knox was traded to the Portland Trail Blazers in a four-team trade involving the Atlanta Hawks and Golden State Warriors. He made his Trail Blazers debut on February 13, recording four points and two rebounds in a 127–115 win over the Los Angeles Lakers. On April 8, Knox scored a season-high 30 points, along with 11 rebounds, in a 136–125 loss to the Los Angeles Clippers. In 21 games for the team (including four starts), he averaged 8.5 points, 3.3 rebounds, and 0.9 assists.

On October 2, 2023, Knox re-signed with the Trail Blazers, but was waived on October 21, prior to the start of the 2023–24 season. Nine days later, he joined the Rip City Remix, but never played for them.

=== Return to Detroit (2023–2024) ===
On November 8, 2023, Knox re-signed with the Detroit Pistons. On January 12, 2024, Knox scored a season-high 19 points with seven rebounds in a 112–110 loss against the Houston Rockets. He played in 31 appearances (including 11 starts) for the Pistons during the 2023–24 season, averaging 7.2 points, 2.4 rebounds, and 0.7 assists.

On February 8, 2024, Knox was traded to the Utah Jazz, alongside a second round pick and the rights to Gabriele Procida, in exchange for Simone Fontecchio. However, he was waived the next day.

=== Rip City Remix (2024) ===
On March 1, 2024, Knox rejoined the Rip City Remix.

=== Santa Cruz Warriors (2024–2025) ===
After joining them for the 2024 NBA Summer League, Knox signed with the Golden State Warriors on September 25, 2024, but was waived on October 19. On October 28, he joined the Santa Cruz Warriors.

=== Golden State Warriors (2025) ===
After averaging 21.8 points, 8.0 rebounds, and 2.4 assists in 28 games for Santa Cruz, the Golden State Warriors signed him to a 10 day contract on February 19, 2025. He made his debut with the Warriors in a 132–108 win against Sacramento Kings on February 21, finishing with five points and one rebound. On March 1, Knox signed a second 10-day contract with the Warriors. On March 22, the Warriors signed Knox to a contract for the rest of the 2024–25 season. In 14 appearances for Golden State, he recorded averages of 3.3 points, 1.2 rebounds, and 0.4 assists. On April 30, during the first round of the playoffs, Knox recorded 14 points, four rebounds and two assists in a 131–116 Game 5 loss against the Houston Rockets.

=== Windy City Bulls (2025–2026) ===
On October 8, 2025, Knox signed with the Chicago Bulls. He was waived by Chicago the same day, and subsequently joined the Windy City Bulls. On March 16, 2026, Knox recorded a career-high 40 points, 12 rebounds, and four assists during a 116–115 victory over the Wisconsin Herd.

On September 23, 2026, Knox signed an Exhibit 10 contract with the Orlando Magic, but was waived on October 16, 2026, alongside Malaki Branham and JD Davison.

=== Unicaja Málaga (2026–present) ===
On October 29, 2026, Knox signed with Unicaja Málaga of the Spanish Liga ACB and the Basketball Champions League (BCL).

== National team career ==
Knox won two gold medals with USA Basketball at the 2015 FIBA Americas Under-16 Championship and 2016 FIBA Under-17 World Championship.

== Career statistics ==
Legend
GP	Games played	GS	Games started	MPG	Minutes per game
FG%	Field goal percentage	3P%	3-point field goal percentage	FT%	Free throw percentage
RPG	Rebounds per game	APG	Assists per game	SPG	Steals per game
BPG	Blocks per game	PPG	Points per game	**Bold**	Career high

=== NBA ===
==== Regular season ====
Year	Team	GP	GS	MPG	FG%	3P%	FT%	RPG	APG	SPG	BPG	PPG
2018–19	New York	**75**	**57**	**28.8**	.370	.343	.717	**4.5**	**1.1**	**.6**	.3	**12.8**
2019–20	New York	65	4	17.9	.359	.327	.653	2.8	.9	.4	**.4**	6.4
2020–21	New York	42	0	11.0	.392	**.393**	.800	1.5	.5	.3	.1	3.9
2021–22	New York	13	0	8.5	.375	.357	.700	1.7	.2	.2	.1	3.6
2021–22	Atlanta	17	0	6.6	.356	.192	.750	1.3	.4	.1	.1	2.7
2022–23	Detroit	42	1	14.1	.469	.371	.788	2.6	.4	.3	.3	5.6
2022–23	Portland	21	4	17.1	.444	.314	.741	3.3	.9	.5	.0	8.5
2023–24	Detroit	31	11	18.1	.462	.330	**.909**	2.4	.7	.4	.2	7.2
2024–25	Golden State	14	0	5.0	**.500**	.267	.750	1.2	.4	.1	.3	3.3
Career		320	77	17.5	.393	.340	.723	2.8	.7	.4	.3	7.3

==== Playoffs ====
Year	Team	GP	GS	MPG	FG%	3P%	FT%	RPG	APG	SPG	BPG	PPG
2021	New York	1	0	4.0	—	—	**1.000**	**1.0**	**1.0**	.0	**1.0**	2.0
2022	Atlanta	**2**	0	**4.5**	.636	.600	**1.000**	**1.0**	.0	**1.0**	.0	**11.0**
Career		3	0	4.3	.636	.600	1.000	1.0	.3	.7	.3	8.0

=== College ===
Year	Team	GP	GS	MPG	FG%	3P%	FT%	RPG	APG	SPG	BPG	PPG
2017–18	Kentucky	37	37	32.4	.447	.341	.774	5.4	1.4	.8	.3	15.6

== Personal life ==
Knox II is the son of former NFL receiver Kevin Knox. He has two younger brothers who also play basketball. Kobe plays college basketball for the South Florida and Karter is a former 5-star recruit who plays college basketball for University of Arkansas. On September 4, 2018, Puma signed Knox to a multi-year endorsement deal.
