= 2020–21 New York Knicks season =

Season of National Basketball Association team the New York Knicks

- Head coach: Tom Thibodeau
- President: Leon Rose
- General manager: Scott Perry
- Owners: Madison Square Garden Sports
- Arena: Madison Square Garden

Results
- Record: 41–31 (.569)
- Place: Division: 3rd (Atlantic); Conference: 4th (Eastern)
- Playoff finish: First round (lost to Hawks 1–4)
- Stats at Basketball Reference

Local media
- Television: MSG TV
- Radio: WEPN-FM

The 2020–21 New York Knicks season was the 75th season of the franchise in the National Basketball Association (NBA). On July 30, 2020, the Knicks hired Tom Thibodeau as their new head coach.

Amidst the COVID-19 pandemic, fan attendance in home games was prohibited until February 23, 2021, per an executive order from Governor of New York Andrew Cuomo. The Knicks reopened Madison Square Garden to spectators on February 23.

On May 3, with a 118–104 win over the Memphis Grizzlies, the Knicks clinched their first winning season since the 2012–13 season, and on May 12, clinched their first playoff appearance since 2013, ending their eight-year playoff drought.

The Knicks faced the Atlanta Hawks in the first round of the 2021 NBA playoffs, losing in five games.

After the regular season, Julius Randle was named NBA Most Improved Player, while head coach Tom Thibodeau was named the NBA Coach of the Year, becoming the first Knicks head coach since Pat Riley in 1992–93 to receive the award.

== Draft ==
2020 NBA draft picks
Round	Pick	Player	Position	Nationality	School/club
1	8	Obi Toppin	PF	United States	Dayton
1	23	Leandro Bolmaro	SF	Argentina	FC Barcelona

The Knicks entered the draft holding two first-round picks and one second-round pick. The first-round pick (no. 27) was acquired on February 6, 2020, in a trade with the Los Angeles Clippers. The second-round pick was acquired on February 7, 2018, in a trade with the Charlotte Hornets. Before the draft, the Knicks traded their 27th and 38th overall picks to the Utah Jazz in exchange for draft rights to Ante Tomić and 23rd overall pick. The Knicks used their eighth overall pick to select Obi Toppin, and then selected Leandro Bolmaro with the 23rd overall pick, who was then traded to the Minnesota Timberwolves.

== Roster ==
2020–21 New York Knicks roster
Players

Pos.	No.	Player	Height	Weight	DOB	From
G/F	9	RJ Barrett	6 ft 6 in (1.98 m)	214 lb (97 kg)	2000-06-14	Duke
G/F	25	Reggie Bullock	6 ft 6 in (1.98 m)	205 lb (93 kg)	1991-03-16	North Carolina
G	18	Alec Burks	6 ft 6 in (1.98 m)	214 lb (97 kg)	1991-07-20	Colorado
F	67	Taj Gibson	6 ft 9 in (2.06 m)	232 lb (105 kg)	1985-06-24	USC
G	0	Jared Harper (TW)	5 ft 10 in (1.78 m)	175 lb (79 kg)	1997-09-14	Auburn
F	20	Kevin Knox II	6 ft 7 in (2.01 m)	215 lb (98 kg)	1999-08-11	Kentucky
F/C	3	Nerlens Noel	6 ft 11 in (2.11 m)	220 lb (100 kg)	1994-04-10	Kentucky
G	11	Frank Ntilikina	6 ft 4 in (1.93 m)	200 lb (91 kg)	1998-07-28	France
G	6	Elfrid Payton	6 ft 3 in (1.91 m)	195 lb (88 kg)	1994-02-22	Louisiana
C	14	Norvel Pelle	6 ft 10 in (2.08 m)	231 lb (105 kg)	1993-02-03	Price HS (CA)
G/F	21	Theo Pinson (TW)	6 ft 5 in (1.96 m)	212 lb (96 kg)	1995-11-05	North Carolina
G	5	Immanuel Quickley	6 ft 3 in (1.91 m)	190 lb (86 kg)	1999-06-17	Kentucky
F/C	30	Julius Randle	6 ft 8 in (2.03 m)	250 lb (113 kg)	1994-11-29	Kentucky
C	23	Mitchell Robinson (injured)	7 ft 0 in (2.13 m)	240 lb (109 kg)	1998-04-01	Chalmette HS (LA)
G	4	Derrick Rose	6 ft 2 in (1.88 m)	200 lb (91 kg)	1988-10-04	Memphis
F	1	Obi Toppin	6 ft 9 in (2.06 m)	220 lb (100 kg)	1998-03-04	Dayton
G	17	Luca Vildoza	6 ft 3 in (1.91 m)	190 lb (86 kg)	1995-08-11	Argentina

Coaches
Head coach
- Tom Thibodeau
Assistant(s)
- Johnnie Bryant (associate HC)
- Darren Erman
- Andy Greer
- Larry Greer
- Kenny Payne

Legend
- (DP) Unsigned draft pick
- (FA) Free agent
- (S) Suspended
- (GL) On assignment to G League affiliate
- (TW) Two-way affiliate player
- Injured

Roster
Updated: June 2, 2021

== Standings ==
=== Division ===
Atlantic Division	W	L	PCT	GB	Home	Road	Div	GP
c − Philadelphia 76ers	49	23	.681	–	29‍–‍7	20‍–‍16	10–2	72
x – Brooklyn Nets	48	24	.667	1.0	28‍–‍8	20‍–‍16	8–4	72
x – New York Knicks	41	31	.569	8.0	25‍–‍11	16‍–‍20	4–8	72
x – Boston Celtics	36	36	.500	13.0	21‍–‍15	15‍–‍21	4–8	72
Toronto Raptors	27	45	.375	22.0	16‍–‍20	11‍–‍25	4–8	72

=== Conference ===
Eastern Conference
#	Team	W	L	PCT	GB	GP
1	c − Philadelphia 76ers *	49	23	.681	–	72
2	x – Brooklyn Nets	48	24	.667	1.0	72
3	y – Milwaukee Bucks *	46	26	.639	3.0	72
4	x – New York Knicks	41	31	.569	8.0	72
5	y – Atlanta Hawks *	41	31	.569	8.0	72
6	x – Miami Heat	40	32	.556	9.0	72
7	x – Boston Celtics	36	36	.500	13.0	72
8	x – Washington Wizards	34	38	.472	15.0	72
9	pi – Indiana Pacers	34	38	.472	15.0	72
10	pi – Charlotte Hornets	33	39	.458	16.0	72
11	Chicago Bulls	31	41	.431	18.0	72
12	Toronto Raptors	27	45	.375	22.0	72
13	Cleveland Cavaliers	22	50	.306	27.0	72
14	Orlando Magic	21	51	.292	28.0	72
15	Detroit Pistons	20	52	.278	29.0	72

== Game log ==
=== Preseason ===
The preseason schedule was announced on November 27, 2020.

2020 preseason game log
Total: 3–1 (home: 2–0; road: 1–1)
Preseason: 3–1 (home: 2–0; road: 1–1)

Game	Date	Team	Score	High points	High rebounds	High assists	Location Attendance	Record
1	December 11	@ Detroit	W 90–84	Barrett (15)	Noel, Randle (8)	Payton (7)	Little Caesars Arena; No in-person attendance	1–0
2	December 13	@ Detroit	L 91–99	Barrett (25)	Noel (10)	Randle (5)	Little Caesars Arena; No in-person attendance	1–1
3	December 16	Cleveland	W 100–93	Randle (18)	Robinson (10)	Payton, Quickley (7)	Madison Square Garden; No in-person attendance	2–1
4	December 18	Cleveland	W 119–83	Quickley (22)	Robinson (12)	Randle (8)	Madison Square Garden; No in-person attendance	3–1

2020–21 preseason schedule

=== Regular season ===
The schedule for the first half of the season was released on December 4, 2020, while the schedule for the second half was released on February 24, 2021.

2020–21 game log
Total: 41–31 (home: 25–11; road: 16–20)
December: 2–3 (home: 1–1; road: 1–2)

Game	Date	Team	Score	High points	High rebounds	High assists	Location Attendance	Record
1	December 23	@ Indiana	L 107–121	Barrett (26)	Randle (9)	Randle (9)	Bankers Life Fieldhouse; No in-person attendance	0–1
2	December 26	Philadelphia	L 89–109	Randle (25)	Robinson (9)	Barrett (4)	Madison Square Garden; No in-person attendance	0–2
3	December 27	Milwaukee	W 130–110	Randle (29)	Randle (14)	Payton, Randle (7)	Madison Square Garden; No in-person attendance	1–2
4	December 29	@ Cleveland	W 95–86	Randle (28)	Randle (12)	Randle (11)	Rocket Mortgage FieldHouse; 300	2–2
5	December 31	@ Toronto	L 83–100	Knox, Randle (16)	Randle (10)	Randle, Rivers (5)	Amalie Arena; 3,449	2–3

January: 7–9 (home: 3–4; road: 4–5)

Game	Date	Team	Score	High points	High rebounds	High assists	Location Attendance	Record
6	January 2	@ Indiana	W 106–102	Barrett (25)	Randle (11)	Randle (8)	Bankers Life Fieldhouse; No in-person attendance	3–3
7	January 4	@ Atlanta	W 113–108	Randle (28)	Randle (17)	Randle (9)	State Farm Arena; No in-person attendance	4–3
8	January 6	Utah	W 112–100	Randle (30)	Randle (16)	Payton (8)	Madison Square Garden; No in-person attendance	5–3
9	January 8	Oklahoma City	L 89–101	Barrett (19)	Randle (12)	Randle (7)	Madison Square Garden; No in-person attendance	5–4
10	January 10	Denver	L 89–114	Randle (29)	Randle (10)	Payton, Randle (5)	Madison Square Garden; No in-person attendance	5–5
11	January 11	@ Charlotte	L 88–109	Knox (19)	Robinson (11)	Barrett, Randle (5)	Spectrum Center; No in-person attendance	5–6
12	January 13	Brooklyn	L 109–116	Randle (30)	Robinson (12)	Randle (5)	Madison Square Garden; No in-person attendance	5–7
13	January 15	@ Cleveland	L 103–106	Randle (28)	Randle, Robinson (6)	Randle (6)	Rocket Mortgage FieldHouse; 1,944	5–8
14	January 17	@ Boston	W 105–75	Randle (20)	Randle (12)	Quickley (8)	TD Garden; No in-person attendance	6–8
15	January 18	Orlando	W 91–84	Barrett (22)	Randle (17)	Barrett, Payton (4)	Madison Square Garden; No in-person attendance	7–8
16	January 21	@ Golden State	W 119–104	Barrett (28)	Randle (17)	Randle (9)	Chase Center; No in-person attendance	8–8
17	January 22	@ Sacramento	L 94–103	Randle (26)	Randle (15)	Randle (4)	Golden 1 Center; No in-person attendance	8–9
18	January 24	@ Portland	L 113–116	Quickley (31)	Noel (11)	Randle (5)	Moda Center; No in-person attendance	8–10
19	January 26	@ Utah	L 94–108	Rivers (25)	Randle (10)	Barrett, Randle (4)	Vivint Arena; 1,932	8–11
20	January 29	Cleveland	W 102–81	Quickley (25)	Randle (8)	Randle (6)	Madison Square Garden; No in-person attendance	9–11
21	January 31	L.A. Clippers	L 115–129	Randle (27)	Randle (12)	Randle (5)	Madison Square Garden; No in-person attendance	9–12

February: 9–5 (home: 6–2; road: 3–3)

Game	Date	Team	Score	High points	High rebounds	High assists	Location Attendance	Record
22	February 1	@ Chicago	L 102–110	Randle (23)	Randle (11)	Quickley, Randle (7)	United Center; No in-person attendance	9–13
23	February 3	@ Chicago	W 107–103	Randle (27)	Robinson (11)	Randle (6)	United Center; No in-person attendance	10–13
24	February 6	Portland	W 110–99	Payton, Randle (22)	Randle (11)	Payton, Randle (4)	Madison Square Garden; No in-person attendance	11–13
25	February 7	Miami	L 103–109	Randle (26)	Randle (13)	Randle (7)	Madison Square Garden; No in-person attendance	11–14
26	February 9	@ Miami	L 96–98	Payton (18)	Randle (8)	Payton (4)	American Airlines Arena; No in-person attendance	11–15
27	February 12	@ Washington	W 109–91	Randle (24)	Randle (18)	Rose (6)	Capital One Arena; No in-person attendance	12–15
28	February 13	Houston	W 121–99	Quickley, Randle (22)	Randle (9)	Barrett (5)	Madison Square Garden; No in-person attendance	13–15
29	February 15	Atlanta	W 123–112	Randle (44)	Randle (9)	Quickley, Randle (5)	Madison Square Garden; No in-person attendance	14–15
30	February 17	@ Orlando	L 89–107	Randle (25)	Noel (9)	Payton (5)	Amway Center; 4,249	14–16
—	February 20	San Antonio	—	Postponed due to COVID-19 pandemic; moved to May 13			Madison Square Garden	—
31	February 21	Minnesota	W 103–99	Randle (25)	Randle (14)	Payton (7)	Madison Square Garden; No in-person attendance	15–16
32	February 23	Golden State	L 106–114	Randle (25)	Gibson (11)	Rose (8)	Madison Square Garden; 1,981	15–17
33	February 25	Sacramento	W 140–121	Quickley (25)	Randle (14)	Rose (6)	Madison Square Garden; 1,981	16–17
34	February 27	Indiana	W 110–107	Randle (28)	Randle (10)	Rose (11)	Madison Square Garden; 1,981	17–17
35	February 28	@ Detroit	W 109–90	Randle (25)	Noel (11)	Randle (6)	Little Caesars Arena; No in-person attendance	18–17

March: 6–7 (home: 4–2; road: 2–5)

Game	Date	Team	Score	High points	High rebounds	High assists	Location Attendance	Record
36	March 2	@ San Antonio	L 93–119	Quickley (26)	Noel (12)	Randle (5)	AT&T Center; No in-person attendance	18–18
37	March 4	Detroit	W 114–104	Randle (27)	Randle (16)	Randle (7)	Madison Square Garden; 1,981	19–18
38	March 11	@ Milwaukee	L 101–134	Barrett (22)	Randle (8)	Burks (8)	Fiserv Forum; 1,800	19–19
39	March 13	@ Oklahoma City	W 119–97	Barrett (32)	Randle (12)	Randle (12)	Chesapeake Energy Arena; No in-person attendance	20–19
40	March 15	@ Brooklyn	L 112–117	Randle (33)	Randle (12)	Randle (6)	Barclays Center; 1,637	20–20
41	March 16	@ Philadelphia	L 96–99	Burks, Randle (19)	Randle (15)	Randle (8)	Wells Fargo Center; 3,071	20–21
42	March 18	Orlando	W 94–93	Burks (21)	Burks, Randle (10)	Randle (17)	Madison Square Garden; 1,531	21–21
43	March 21	Philadelphia	L 100–101 (OT)	Randle (24)	Noel (10)	Barrett, Burks (4)	Madison Square Garden; 1,981	21–22
44	March 23	Washington	W 131–113	Randle (37)	Robinson (12)	Barrett (5)	Madison Square Garden; 1,589	22–22
45	March 25	Washington	W 106–102	Burks (27)	Barrett (10)	Barrett (5)	Madison Square Garden; 1,817	23–22
46	March 27	@ Milwaukee	W 102–96	Barrett, Burks (21)	Noel (11)	Barrett (7)	Fiserv Forum; 3,280	24–22
47	March 29	Miami	L 88–98	Randle (22)	Noel (11)	Barrett (4)	Madison Square Garden; 1,981	24–23
48	March 31	@ Minnesota	L 101–102	Randle (26)	Randle (12)	Randle (6)	Target Center; No in-person attendance	24–24

April: 11–4 (home: 8–2; road: 3–2)

Game	Date	Team	Score	High points	High rebounds	High assists	Location Attendance	Record
49	April 2	Dallas	L 86–99	Burks (20)	Randle (8)	Randle (11)	Madison Square Garden; 1,981	24–25
50	April 3	@ Detroit	W 125–81	Randle (29)	Randle (8)	Payton (9)	Little Caesars Arena; 750	25–25
51	April 5	@ Brooklyn	L 112–114	Barrett (22)	Randle (15)	Randle (12)	Barclays Center; 1,773	25–26
52	April 7	@ Boston	L 99–101	Barrett (29)	Randle (9)	Randle (6)	TD Garden; 2,298	25–27
53	April 9	Memphis	W 133–129 (OT)	Barrett, Quickley (20)	Randle (10)	Randle (11)	Madison Square Garden; 1,912	26–27
54	April 11	Toronto	W 102–96	Randle (26)	Noel (13)	Barrett, Randle (5)	Madison Square Garden; 1,833	27–27
55	April 12	L.A. Lakers	W 111–96	Randle (34)	Gibson, Randle (10)	Randle (4)	Madison Square Garden; 1,981	28–27
56	April 14	@ New Orleans	W 116–106	Randle (32)	Gibson (10)	Randle (5)	Smoothie King Center; 3,700	29–27
57	April 16	@ Dallas	W 117–109	Randle (44)	Noel, Randle (10)	Randle (7)	American Airlines Center; 4,246	30–27
58	April 18	New Orleans	W 122–112 (OT)	Randle (33)	Gibson (14)	Randle (10)	Madison Square Garden; 1,981	31–27
59	April 20	Charlotte	W 109–97	Barrett (24)	Noel (11)	Randle (7)	Madison Square Garden; 1,753	32–27
60	April 21	Atlanta	W 137–127 (OT)	Randle (40)	Noel (12)	Randle (6)	Madison Square Garden; 1,981	33–27
61	April 24	Toronto	W 120–103	Randle (31)	Barrett (12)	Rose (7)	Madison Square Garden; 1,981	34–27
62	April 26	Phoenix	L 110–118	Rose (22)	Randle, Rose (6)	Rose (6)	Madison Square Garden; 1,981	34–28
63	April 28	Chicago	W 113–94	Randle (34)	Noel (8)	Barrett, Rose (6)	Madison Square Garden; 1,981	35–28

May: 6–3 (home: 3–0; road: 3–3)

Game	Date	Team	Score	High points	High rebounds	High assists	Location Attendance	Record
64	May 2	@ Houston	W 122–97	Randle (31)	Barrett, Randle (7)	Randle (6)	Toyota Center; 3,431	36–28
65	May 3	@ Memphis	W 118–104	Randle (28)	Gibson (12)	Randle (6)	FedExForum; 2,789	37–28
66	May 5	@ Denver	L 97–113	Quickley (18)	Randle (8)	Randle (5)	Ball Arena; 4,038	37–29
67	May 7	@ Phoenix	L 105–128	Randle (24)	Randle (11)	Rose (6)	Phoenix Suns Arena; 8,063	37–30
68	May 9	@ L.A. Clippers	W 106–100	Rose (25)	Randle (14)	Rose (8)	Staples Center; 2,578	38–30
69	May 11	@ L.A. Lakers	L 99–101 (OT)	Randle (31)	Randle (8)	Rose (6)	Staples Center; 3,550	38–31
70	May 13	San Antonio	W 102–98	Burks (30)	Burks (10)	Randle (9)	Madison Square Garden; 1,981	39–31
71	May 15	Charlotte	W 118–109 (OT)	Randle (33)	Noel (11)	Randle (13)	Madison Square Garden; 1,981	40–31
72	May 16	Boston	W 96–92	Barrett (22)	Randle (7)	Randle (7)	Madison Square Garden; 1,981	41–31

2020–21 season schedule

=== Playoffs ===
2021 playoff game log
Total: 1–4 (home: 1–2; road: 0–2)
First round: 1–4 (home: 1–2; road: 0–2)

Game	Date	Team	Score	High points	High rebounds	High assists	Location Attendance	Series
1	May 23	Atlanta	L 105–107 (OT)	Burks (27)	Randle (12)	Rose (5)	Madison Square Garden; 15,047	0–1
2	May 26	Atlanta	W 101–92	Rose (26)	Randle (12)	Randle, Rose (4)	Madison Square Garden; 16,254	1–1
3	May 28	@ Atlanta	L 94–105	Rose (30)	Randle (11)	Rose (5)	State Farm Arena; 15,743	1–2
4	May 30	@ Atlanta	L 96–113	Randle (23)	Randle (10)	Randle (7)	State Farm Arena; 16,458	1–3
5	June 2	Atlanta	L 89–103	Randle (23)	Randle (13)	Barrett, Rose (5)	Madison Square Garden; 16,512	1–4

2021 playoff schedule

== Player statistics ==
Legend
GP	Games played	GS	Games started	MPG	Minutes per game
FG%	Field-goal percentage	3P%	3-point field-goal percentage	FT%	Free-throw percentage
RPG	Rebounds per game	APG	Assists per game	SPG	Steals per game
BPG	Blocks per game	PPG	Points per game

=== Regular season statistics ===
As of May 16, 2021

New York Knicks statistics
Player	GP	GS	MPG	FG%	3P%	FT%	RPG	APG	SPG	BPG	PPG
RJ Barrett	72	72	34.9	.441	.401	.746	5.8	3.0	.7	.3	17.6
Ignas Brazdeikis	4	0	1.8	.000	—	1.000	.5	.3	.0	.0	.5
Reggie Bullock	65	64	30.0	.442	.410	.909	3.4	1.5	.8	.2	10.9
Alec Burks	49	5	25.6	.420	.415	.856	4.6	2.2	.6	.3	12.7
Taj Gibson	45	3	20.8	.627	.200	.727	5.6	.8	.7	1.1	5.4
Jared Harper	8	0	2.0	.000	.000	.750	.3	.1	.0	.0	.4
Kevin Knox II	42	0	11.0	.392	.393	.800	1.5	.5	.3	.1	3.9
Nerlens Noel	64	41	24.2	.614	.000	.714	6.4	.7	1.1	2.2	5.1
Frank Ntilikina	33	4	9.8	.367	.479	.444	.9	.6	.5	.1	2.7
Elfrid Payton	63	63	23.6	.432	.286	.682	3.4	3.2	.7	.1	10.1
Norvel Pelle	9	0	5.8	.714	—	.500	1.2	.1	.1	.7	1.2
Theo Pinson	17	0	2.0	.111	.000	—	.3	.1	.0	.0	.1
Immanuel Quickley	64	3	19.4	.395	.389	.891	2.1	2.0	.5	.2	11.4
Julius Randle	71	71	37.6	.456	.411	.811	10.2	6.0	.9	.3	24.1
Austin Rivers	21	2	21.0	.430	.364	.714	2.2	2.0	.6	.0	7.3
Mitchell Robinson	31	29	27.5	.653	—	.491	8.1	.5	1.1	1.5	8.3
Derrick Rose	35	3	26.8	.487	.411	.883	2.9	4.2	.9	.4	14.9
Dennis Smith Jr.	3	0	9.3	.200	.000	.833	.7	1.0	1.0	.0	3.0
Obi Toppin	62	0	11.0	.498	.306	.731	2.2	.5	.3	.2	4.1

=== Playoff statistics ===
As of June 2, 2021

New York Knicks statistics
Player	GP	GS	MPG	FG%	3P%	FT%	RPG	APG	SPG	BPG	PPG
RJ Barrett	5	5	32.4	.388	.286	.800	7.2	3.0	.8	.4	14.4
Reggie Bullock	5	5	32.4	.385	.345	.800	3.4	1.2	.6	.2	8.8
Alec Burks	5	0	25.6	.429	.333	.737	5.0	2.6	.2	.0	14.0
Taj Gibson	5	3	27.6	.600	—	1.000	7.0	.8	1.6	1.0	5.0
Kevin Knox II	1	0	4.0	—	—	1.000	1.0	1.0	.0	1.0	2.0
Nerlens Noel	5	2	18.4	.500	—	.813	4.0	.2	.8	.6	4.6
Frank Ntilikina	3	0	1.3	.000	.000	—	.0	.0	.0	.0	.0
Elfrid Payton	2	2	6.5	.000	—	.500	.0	.5	.5	.0	.5
Immanuel Quickley	5	0	15.4	.303	.364	.714	1.4	1.0	.6	.0	5.8
Julius Randle	5	5	36.0	.298	.333	.852	11.6	4.0	.6	.0	18.0
Derrick Rose	5	3	35.0	.476	.471	1.000	4.0	5.0	.4	.2	19.4
Obi Toppin	5	0	13.0	.522	.333	.833	2.6	.4	.0	.2	6.4

== Transactions ==
=== Trades ===
November 18, 2020	To New York Knicks Draft rights to Ante Tomić; 2020 first-round pick	To Utah Jazz 2020 first-round pick 2020 second-round pick
November 20, 2020	To New York Knicks Draft rights to Mathias Lessort; Draft rights to Immanuel Quickley; 2023 second-round pick	To Oklahoma City Thunder James Johnson; Draft rights to Aleksej Pokuševski; 2024 second-round pick
November 20, 2020	To Minnesota Timberwolves Ricky Rubio; Draft rights to Leandro Bolmaro; Draft rights to Jaden McDaniels	
November 23, 2020	To New York Knicks Ed Davis; Two future second rounds picks	To Utah Jazz Cash considerations
November 24, 2020	To New York Knicks Jacob Evans; Omari Spellman; 2026 second-round pick	To Minnesota Timberwolves Ed Davis
November 27, 2020	To New York Knicks Austin Rivers; Draft rights to Tadija Dragićević; Draft rights to Axel Hervelle; Draft rights to Sergio Llull	To Houston Rockets Draft rights to Issuf Sanon
February 8, 2021	To New York Knicks Derrick Rose	To Detroit Pistons Dennis Smith Jr. 2021 second-round pick
March 25, 2021	To New York Knicks Terrance Ferguson; Vincent Poirier; Rights to Emir Preldžić; 2021 second-round pick 2024 protected second-round pick	To Philadelphia 76ers Ignas Brazdeikis; George Hill
March 25, 2021	To Oklahoma City Thunder Austin Rivers; Tony Bradley; 2025 second-round pick 2026 second-round pick	

=== Additions ===
Date	Player	Former team	Ref
November 22, 2020	Alec Burks	Philadelphia 76ers	
November 25, 2020	Nerlens Noel	Oklahoma City Thunder	
November 28, 2020	Michael Kidd-Gilchrist	Dallas Mavericks	
November 29, 2020	Myles Powell	Seton Hall Pirates	
December 9, 2020	Skal Labissière	Portland Trail Blazers	
December 12, 2020	Tyler Hall	Westchester Knicks	
December 12, 2020	Andrew White	Westchester Knicks	
December 14, 2020	James Young	Maccabi Haifa	
December 17, 2020	Bryce Brown	Maine Red Claws	
December 17, 2020	Louis King	Detroit Pistons	
April 2, 2021	Norvel Pelle	Sacramento Kings	
April 5, 2021	John Henson	Detroit Pistons	
April 12, 2021	Norvel Pelle	—	
April 22, 2021	Norvel Pelle	—	
April 23, 2021	Myles Powell	Westchester Knicks	
May 6, 2021	Luca Vildoza	Baskonia	

=== Subtractions ===
Date	Player	New team	Ref
November 19, 2020	Wayne Ellington	Detroit Pistons	
November 19, 2020	Kenny Wooten	Houston Rockets	
November 23, 2020	Maurice Harkless	Miami Heat	
November 25, 2020	Damyean Dotson	Cleveland Cavaliers	
November 26, 2020	Bobby Portis	Milwaukee Bucks	
December 9, 2020	Jacob Evans	Erie BayHawks	
December 11, 2020	Skal Labissière	Westchester Knicks	
December 12, 2020	Andrew White	Westchester Knicks	
December 14, 2020	Tyler Hall	Westchester Knicks	
December 16, 2020	James Young	Westchester Knicks	
December 17, 2020	Louis King	Westchester Knicks	
December 19, 2020	Bryce Brown	Westchester Knicks	
December 19, 2020	Michael Kidd-Gilchrist		
December 19, 2020	Myles Powell	Westchester Knicks	
January 7, 2021	Omari Spellman	Erie BayHawks	
March 29, 2021	Terrance Ferguson	Lavrio	
March 29, 2021	Vincent Poirier	Real Madrid	
