= 2019–20 New York Knicks season =

Season of National Basketball Association team the New York Knicks

- Head coach: David Fizdale (fired); Mike Miller (interim)
- President: Steve Mills (fired); Leon Rose
- General manager: Scott Perry
- Owners: The Madison Square Garden Company
- Arena: Madison Square Garden

Results
- Record: 21–45 (.318)
- Place: Division: 5th (Atlantic); Conference: 12th (Eastern)
- Playoff finish: Did not qualify
- Stats at Basketball Reference

Local media
- Television: MSG TV
- Radio: WEPN-FM

The 2019–20 New York Knicks season was the 74th season of the franchise in the National Basketball Association (NBA). Following a league-worst 17–65 record in the previous season, the Knicks had a 14 percent chance of receiving the first overall pick in the 2019 NBA draft. During the NBA draft lottery held on May 14, 2019, the Knicks received the third overall pick.

On December 6, 2019, head coach David Fizdale was fired by the Knicks after a 4–18 start, and Mike Miller was named the Knicks' interim head coach. On February 4, 2020, general manager Scott Perry took over basketball operations duties on an interim basis after the Knicks fired president Steve Mills. On March 2, Leon Rose was named as permanent replacement for Mills.

The season was suspended by the league officials following the games of March 11 after it was reported that Rudy Gobert tested positive for COVID-19. On June 4, the regular season was declared over with the remaining games being cancelled when the NBA Board of Governors approved a plan that would restart the season with 22 teams returning to play in the NBA Bubble on July 31, which was approved by the National Basketball Players Association the next day.

== Draft ==
2019 NBA draft picks
Round	Pick	Player	Position	Nationality	School/club
1	3	RJ Barrett	SG/SF	Canada	Duke
2	55	Kyle Guy	PG	United States	Virginia

The Knicks entered the draft holding one first-round pick and one second-round pick, which was acquired from the Houston Rockets. Their original second-round pick was conveyed to the Brooklyn Nets via the Philadelphia 76ers. Prior to the NBA draft lottery, the Knicks had a 14 percent chance of receiving the first overall pick. They used the third overall pick to draft RJ Barrett, and selected Kyle Guy with the 55th overall pick, who was then traded to the Sacramento Kings in exchange for Ignas Brazdeikis.

== Roster ==
2019–20 New York Knicks roster
Players

Pos.	No.	Player	Height	Weight	DOB	From
G	9	RJ Barrett	6 ft 6 in (1.98 m)	214 lb (97 kg)	2000-07-14	Duke
F	17	Ignas Brazdeikis	6 ft 6 in (1.98 m)	221 lb (100 kg)	1999-01-08	Michigan
G/F	25	Reggie Bullock	6 ft 6 in (1.98 m)	205 lb (93 kg)	1991-03-16	North Carolina
G	21	Damyean Dotson	6 ft 5 in (1.96 m)	210 lb (95 kg)	1994-05-06	Houston
G	2	Wayne Ellington	6 ft 4 in (1.93 m)	207 lb (94 kg)	1987-11-29	North Carolina
F	67	Taj Gibson	6 ft 9 in (2.06 m)	232 lb (105 kg)	1985-06-24	USC
G/F	3	Maurice Harkless	6 ft 7 in (2.01 m)	220 lb (100 kg)	1993-05-11	St. John's
G	—	Jared Harper (TW)	5 ft 10 in (1.78 m)	175 lb (79 kg)	1997-09-14	Auburn
F	20	Kevin Knox II	6 ft 7 in (2.01 m)	215 lb (98 kg)	1999-08-11	Kentucky
G	11	Frank Ntilikina	6 ft 4 in (1.93 m)	200 lb (91 kg)	1998-07-28	France
G	6	Elfrid Payton	6 ft 3 in (1.91 m)	195 lb (88 kg)	1994-02-22	Louisiana
G/F	—	Theo Pinson	6 ft 5 in (1.96 m)	212 lb (96 kg)	1995-11-05	North Carolina
F	1	Bobby Portis	6 ft 10 in (2.08 m)	250 lb (113 kg)	1995-02-10	Arkansas
F	30	Julius Randle	6 ft 8 in (2.03 m)	250 lb (113 kg)	1994-11-29	Kentucky
C	23	Mitchell Robinson	7 ft 0 in (2.13 m)	240 lb (109 kg)	1998-04-01	Chalmette HS (LA)
G	5	Dennis Smith	6 ft 2 in (1.88 m)	205 lb (93 kg)	1997-11-25	NC State
F	45	Kenny Wooten (TW)	6 ft 8 in (2.03 m)	235 lb (107 kg)	1998-04-17	Oregon

Coaches
Head coach
- Mike Miller
Assistant(s)
- Keith Bogans
- Jud Buechler
- Kaleb Canales
- Royal Ivey
- Pat Sullivan

Legend
- (DP) Unsigned draft pick
- (FA) Free agent
- (S) Suspended
- (GL) On assignment to G League affiliate
- (TW) Two-way affiliate player
- Injured

Roster
Updated: March 11, 2020

== Standings ==
=== Division ===
Atlantic Division	W	L	PCT	GB	Home	Road	Div	GP
y – Toronto Raptors	53	19	.736	–	26‍–‍10	27‍–‍9	9–5	72
x – Boston Celtics	48	24	.667	5.0	26‍–‍10	22‍–‍14	9–6	72
x – Philadelphia 76ers	43	30	.589	10.5	31‍–‍4	12‍–‍26	11–5	73
x – Brooklyn Nets	35	37	.486	18.0	20‍–‍16	15‍–‍21	6–10	72
New York Knicks	21	45	.318	29.0	11‍–‍22	10‍–‍23	2–11	66

=== Conference ===
Eastern Conference
#	Team	W	L	PCT	GB	GP
1	z – Milwaukee Bucks *	56	17	.767	–	73
2	y – Toronto Raptors *	53	19	.736	2.5	72
3	x – Boston Celtics	48	24	.667	7.5	72
4	x – Indiana Pacers	45	28	.616	11.0	73
5	y – Miami Heat *	44	29	.603	12.0	73
6	x – Philadelphia 76ers	43	30	.589	13.0	73
7	x – Brooklyn Nets	35	37	.486	20.5	72
8	x – Orlando Magic	33	40	.452	23.0	73
9	Washington Wizards	25	47	.347	30.5	72
10	Charlotte Hornets	23	42	.354	29.0	65
11	Chicago Bulls	22	43	.338	30.0	65
12	New York Knicks	21	45	.318	31.5	66
13	Detroit Pistons	20	46	.303	32.5	66
14	Atlanta Hawks	20	47	.299	33.0	67
15	Cleveland Cavaliers	19	46	.292	33.0	65

== Game log ==
=== Preseason ===
The preseason schedule was announced on July 18, 2019.

2019 preseason game log
Total: 1–3 (home: 0–3; road: 1–0)
Preseason: 1–3 (home: 0–3; road: 1–0)

Game	Date	Team	Score	High points	High rebounds	High assists	Location Attendance	Record
1	October 7	@ Washington	W 104–99	Barrett, Morris (17)	Gibson (9)	Randle (7)	Capital One Arena; 9,420	1–0
2	October 11	Washington	L 99–115	Morris (21)	Portis (9)	Ellington (5)	Madison Square Garden; 19,812	1–1
3	October 16	Atlanta	L 96–100	Randle (20)	Morris, Randle (8)	Barrett (6)	Madison Square Garden; 19,812	1–2
4	October 18	New Orleans	L 116–117	Randle (20)	Randle, Smith Jr. (9)	Smith Jr. (6)	Madison Square Garden; 19,812	1–3

2019–20 preseason schedule

=== Regular season ===
The regular season schedule was released on August 12, 2019.

2019–20 game log
Total: 21–45 (home: 11–22; road: 10–23)
October: 1–4 (home: 1–1; road: 0–3)

Game	Date	Team	Score	High points	High rebounds	High assists	Location Attendance	Record
1	October 23	@ San Antonio	L 111–120	Morris (26)	Randle (11)	Payton (8)	AT&T Center; 18,354	0–1
2	October 25	@ Brooklyn	L 109–113	Trier (22)	Randle (11)	Randle (4)	Barclays Center; 17,732	0–2
3	October 26	Boston	L 95–118	Barrett (26)	Portis (11)	Payton (5)	Madison Square Garden; 19,812	0–3
4	October 28	Chicago	W 105–98	Portis (28)	Barrett (15)	Barrett, Randle (5)	Madison Square Garden; 19,812	1–3
5	October 30	@ Orlando	L 83–95	Randle (16)	Portis, Randle (10)	Randle (7)	Amway Center; 17,456	1–4

November: 3–11 (home: 2–6; road: 1–5)

Game	Date	Team	Score	High points	High rebounds	High assists	Location Attendance	Record
6	November 1	@ Boston	L 102–104	Morris (29)	Randle (10)	Barrett, Randle (5)	TD Garden; 18,624	1–5
7	November 3	Sacramento	L 92–113	Morris (28)	Randle (7)	Trier (4)	Madison Square Garden; 19,812	1–6
8	November 6	@ Detroit	L 102–122	Randle (20)	Barrett (6)	Barrett (8)	Little Caesars Arena; 15,463	1–7
9	November 8	@ Dallas	W 106–102	Morris (29)	Portis (12)	Barrett, Ntilikina, Randle (4)	American Airlines Center; 20,257	2–7
10	November 10	Cleveland	L 87–108	Randle (20)	Randle (16)	Ntilikina (6)	Madison Square Garden; 19,812	2–8
11	November 12	@ Chicago	L 102–120	Morris (22)	Morris (9)	Barrett (9)	United Center; 18,668	2–9
12	November 14	Dallas	W 106–103	Morris (20)	Randle (10)	Smith Jr. (8)	Madison Square Garden; 19,812	3–9
13	November 16	Charlotte	L 102–103	Barrett (22)	Robinson (12)	Ntilikina, Randle (6)	Madison Square Garden; 19,401	3–10
14	November 18	Cleveland	W 123–105	Randle (30)	Gibson, Robinson (8)	Ntilikina (6)	Madison Square Garden; 17,097	4–10
15	November 20	@ Philadelphia	L 104–109	Morris (22)	Morris (13)	Morris (6)	Wells Fargo Center; 20,384	4–11
16	November 23	San Antonio	L 104–111	Morris (20)	Randle (8)	Ntilikina (9)	Madison Square Garden; 19,320	4–12
17	November 24	Brooklyn	L 101–103	Morris (26)	Gibson, Randle (8)	Ntilikina, Smith Jr. (5)	Madison Square Garden; 18,770	4–13
18	November 27	@ Toronto	L 98–126	Randle (19)	Randle, Robinson (8)	Barrett, Ntilikina, Smith Jr. (4)	Scotiabank Arena; 19,800	4–14
19	November 29	Philadelphia	L 95–101	Randle (22)	Randle (10)	Ntilikina, Randle (4)	Madison Square Garden; 18,109	4–15

December: 5–9 (home: 1–5; road: 4–4)

Game	Date	Team	Score	High points	High rebounds	High assists	Location Attendance	Record
20	December 1	Boston	L 104–113	Randle (26)	Barrett (7)	Smith Jr. (7)	Madison Square Garden; 18,005	4–16
21	December 2	@ Milwaukee	L 88–132	Randle (19)	Robinson (14)	Smith Jr. (3)	Fiserv Forum; 17,385	4–17
22	December 5	Denver	L 92–129	Robinson (17)	Robinson (7)	Barrett (5)	Madison Square Garden; 18,171	4–18
23	December 7	Indiana	L 103–104	Morris (25)	Randle (12)	Payton (7)	Madison Square Garden; 19,110	4–19
24	December 10	@ Portland	L 87–115	Randle (15)	Portis (10)	Payton (4)	Moda Center; 19,393	4–20
25	December 11	@ Golden State	W 124–122 (OT)	Morris (36)	Randle (13)	Payton, Randle (5)	Chase Center; 18,064	5–20
26	December 13	@ Sacramento	W 103–101	Randle (26)	Randle, Robinson (9)	Morris (5)	Golden 1 Center; 17,583	6–20
27	December 15	@ Denver	L 105–111	Morris (22)	Randle (9)	Payton (11)	Pepsi Center; 18,867	6–21
28	December 17	Atlanta	W 143–120	Barrett (27)	Robinson (13)	Payton (9)	Madison Square Garden; 18,268	7–21
29	December 20	@ Miami	L 114–129	Portis (30)	Portis, Randle (8)	Dotson, Smith Jr. (5)	American Airlines Arena; 19,704	7–22
30	December 21	Milwaukee	L 102–123	Randle (20)	Portis (9)	Payton (10)	Madison Square Garden; 18,124	7–23
31	December 23	Washington	L 115–121	Randle (35)	Robinson (13)	Payton (12)	Madison Square Garden; 19,413	7–24
32	December 26	@ Brooklyn	W 94–82	Randle (33)	Robinson (10)	Payton (4)	Barclays Center; 17,732	8–24
33	December 28	@ Washington	W 107–100	Randle (30)	Randle (16)	Payton (8)	Capital One Arena; 19,033	9–24

January: 4–12 (home: 3–6; road: 1–6)

Game	Date	Team	Score	High points	High rebounds	High assists	Location Attendance	Record
34	January 1	Portland	W 117–93	Randle, Robinson (22)	Randle (13)	Ntilikina (10)	Madison Square Garden; 19,812	10–24
35	January 3	@ Phoenix	L 112–120	Morris (25)	Randle (13)	Payton (6)	Talking Stick Resort Arena; 18,055	10–25
36	January 5	@ L. A. Clippers	L 132–135	Morris (38)	Randle (8)	Allen (6)	Staples Center; 19,068	10–26
37	January 7	@ L. A. Lakers	L 87–117	Barrett (19)	Randle (10)	Payton (4)	Staples Center; 18,997	10–27
38	January 8	@ Utah	L 104–128	Ntilikina (16)	Portis (13)	Portis (6)	Vivint Smart Home Arena; 18,306	10–28
39	January 10	New Orleans	L 111–123	Gibson (19)	Barrett (9)	Payton (7)	Madison Square Garden; 18,003	10–29
40	January 12	Miami	W 124–121	Randle (26)	Gibson, Randle (8)	Payton (5)	Madison Square Garden; 18,861	11–29
41	January 14	@ Milwaukee	L 102–128	Randle (25)	Randle (15)	Allen (6)	Fiserv Forum; 17,590	11–30
42	January 16	Phoenix	L 98–121	Randle (26)	Portis (10)	Payton (7)	Madison Square Garden; 18,215	11–31
43	January 18	Philadelphia	L 87–90	Morris (20)	Randle (12)	Payton (7)	Madison Square Garden; 17,812	11–32
44	January 20	@ Cleveland	W 106–86	Morris, Randle (19)	Randle (9)	Payton (8)	Rocket Mortgage FieldHouse; 17,133	12–32
45	January 22	L. A. Lakers	L 92–100	Morris (20)	Robinson (12)	Payton (9)	Madison Square Garden; 19,812	12–33
46	January 24	Toronto	L 112–118	Dotson, Morris (21)	Randle (11)	Payton (11)	Madison Square Garden; 18,883	12–34
47	January 26	Brooklyn	W 110–97	Randle (22)	Randle (15)	Payton (9)	Madison Square Garden; 17,831	13–34
48	January 28	@ Charlotte	L 92–97	Randle (24)	Robinson (10)	Payton (8)	Spectrum Center; 14,342	13–35
49	January 29	Memphis	L 106–127	Morris (17)	Randle (14)	Payton (11)	Madison Square Garden; 18,768	13–36

February: 5–6 (home: 2–2; road: 3–4)

Game	Date	Team	Score	High points	High rebounds	High assists	Location Attendance	Record
50	February 1	@ Indiana	W 92–85	Morris (28)	Randle (18)	Smith Jr. (6)	Bankers Life Fieldhouse; 17,923	14–36
51	February 3	@ Cleveland	W 139–134 (OT)	Morris (26)	Payton (11)	Payton (15)	Rocket Mortgage FieldHouse; 16,303	15–36
52	February 6	Orlando	W 105–103	Randle (22)	Randle (8)	Payton (9)	Madison Square Garden; 18,895	16–36
53	February 8	@ Detroit	W 95–92	Ellington, Randle (17)	Payton (9)	Payton (6)	Little Caesars Arena; 15,980	17–36
54	February 9	@ Atlanta	L 135–140 (2OT)	Randle (35)	Randle (18)	Payton (9)	State Farm Arena; 16,309	17–37
55	February 12	Washington	L 96–114	Randle (21)	Randle (13)	Payton (8)	Madison Square Garden; 18,835	17–38
56	February 21	Indiana	L 98–106	Portis (19)	Robinson (8)	Smith Jr. (6)	Madison Square Garden; 19,812	17–39
57	February 24	@ Houston	L 112–123	Barrett (21)	Randle (12)	Smith Jr. (5)	Toyota Center; 18,055	17–40
58	February 26	@ Charlotte	L 101–107	Randle (18)	Robinson (16)	Payton (9)	Spectrum Center; 13,152	17–41
59	February 27	@ Philadelphia	L 106–115	Randle (30)	Randle (10)	Payton (12)	Wells Fargo Center; 20,175	17–42
60	February 29	Chicago	W 125–115	Robinson (23)	Randle, Robinson (10)	Payton (10)	Madison Square Garden; 19,812	18–42

March: 3–3 (home: 2–2; road: 1–1)

Game	Date	Team	Score	High points	High rebounds	High assists	Location Attendance	Record
61	March 2	Houston	W 125–123	Barrett (27)	Randle (16)	Payton (6)	Madison Square Garden; 18,142	19–42
62	March 4	Utah	L 104–112	Randle (32)	Randle (11)	Payton (9)	Madison Square Garden; 16,588	19–43
63	March 6	Oklahoma City	L 103–126	Payton (18)	Payton (9)	Payton (8)	Madison Square Garden; 19,499	19–44
64	March 8	Detroit	W 96–84	Randle (22)	Randle (12)	Payton (6)	Madison Square Garden; 18,361	20–44
65	March 10	@ Washington	L 115–122	Ntilikina, Portis (20)	Barrett, Portis (6)	Ntilikina (10)	Capital One Arena; 15,048	20–45
66	March 11	@ Atlanta	W 136–131 (OT)	Randle (33)	Randle (11)	Payton (12)	State Farm Arena; 15,393	21–45

Cancelled games

Game	Date	Team	Score	High points	High rebounds	High assists	Location Attendance	Record
67	March 13	@ Miami					American Airlines Arena	
68	March 17	Charlotte					Madison Square Garden	
69	March 18	@ Boston					TD Garden	
70	March 21	Golden State					Madison Square Garden	
71	March 23	L.A. Clippers					Madison Square Garden	
72	March 25	Toronto					Madison Square Garden	
73	March 27	@ New Orleans					Smoothie King Center	
74	March 28	@ Chicago					United Center	
75	April 1	@ Memphis					FedExForum	
76	April 3	Minnesota					Madison Square Garden	
77	April 5	Miami					Madison Square Garden	
78	April 8	Orlando					Madison Square Garden	
79	April 10	@ Oklahoma City					Chesapeake Energy Arena	
80	April 12	@ Toronto					Scotiabank Arena	
81	April 14	Detroit					Madison Square Garden	
82	April 15	@ Minnesota					Target Center	

2019–20 season schedule

== Player statistics ==
Legend
GP	Games played	GS	Games started	MPG	Minutes per game
FG%	Field-goal percentage	3P%	3-point field-goal percentage	FT%	Free-throw percentage
RPG	Rebounds per game	APG	Assists per game	SPG	Steals per game
BPG	Blocks per game	PPG	Points per game

=== Regular season statistics ===
As of March 12, 2020

New York Knicks statistics
Player	GP	GS	MPG	FG%	3P%	FT%	RPG	APG	SPG	BPG	PPG
Kadeem Allen	10	0	11.7	.432	.313	.636	.9	2.1	.5	.2	5.0
RJ Barrett	56	55	30.4	.402	.320	.614	5.0	2.6	1.0	.3	14.3
Ignas Brazdeikis	9	0	5.9	.273	.111	.800	.6	.4	.0	.1	1.9
Reggie Bullock	29	19	23.6	.402	.333	.810	2.3	1.4	.9	.1	8.1
Damyean Dotson	48	0	17.4	.414	.362	.667	1.9	1.2	.5	.1	6.7
Wayne Ellington	36	1	15.5	.351	.350	.846	1.8	1.2	.4	.1	5.1
Taj Gibson	62	56	16.5	.584	.286	.732	4.3	.8	.4	.5	6.1
Maurice Harkless	12	10	23.8	.455	.280	.625	3.3	1.7	.8	.3	6.8
Kevin Knox II	65	4	17.9	.359	.327	.653	2.8	.9	.4	.4	6.4
Marcus Morris	43	43	32.3	.442	.439	.823	5.4	1.4	.8	.4	19.6
Frank Ntilikina	57	26	20.8	.393	.321	.864	2.1	3.0	.9	.3	6.3
Elfrid Payton	45	36	27.7	.439	.203	.570	4.7	7.2	1.6	.4	10.0
Bobby Portis	66	5	21.1	.450	.358	.763	5.1	1.5	.5	.3	10.1
Julius Randle	64	64	32.5	.460	.277	.733	9.7	3.1	.8	.3	19.5
Mitchell Robinson	61	7	23.1	.742	—	.568	7.0	.6	.9	2.0	9.7
Dennis Smith Jr.	34	3	15.8	.341	.296	.509	2.3	2.9	.8	.2	5.5
Allonzo Trier	24	1	12.1	.481	.358	.791	1.2	1.2	.1	.2	6.5

== Transactions ==
=== Trades ===
June 21, 2019	To New York Knicks Draft rights to Ignas Brazdeikis	To Sacramento Kings Draft rights to Kyle Guy
February 6, 2020	To New York Knicks Maurice Harkless; Draft rights to Issuf Sanon; 2020 first-round pick 2021 protected first-round pick 2021 second-round pick	To Los Angeles Clippers Marcus Morris; Isaiah Thomas
February 6, 2020	To Washington Wizards Jerome Robinson	

=== Additions ===
Date	Player	Former team	Ref
July 9, 2019	Wayne Ellington	Detroit Pistons	
July 9, 2019	Taj Gibson	Minnesota Timberwolves	
July 9, 2019	Elfrid Payton	New Orleans Pelicans	
July 9, 2019	Bobby Portis	Washington Wizards	
July 9, 2019	Julius Randle	New Orleans Pelicans	
July 16, 2019	Reggie Bullock	Los Angeles Lakers	
July 16, 2019	Marcus Morris	Boston Celtics	
September 16, 2019	Amir Hinton	Shaw Bears	
September 16, 2019	V. J. King	Louisville Cardinals	
September 16, 2019	Lamar Peters	Mississippi State Bulldogs	
September 16, 2019	Kenny Wooten	Oregon Ducks	
October 17, 2019	Zak Irvin	Westchester Knicks	
October 23, 2019	Ivan Rabb	Memphis Grizzlies	
January 15, 2020	Kenny Wooten	Westchester Knicks	
June 23, 2020	Theo Pinson	Brooklyn Nets	
June 26, 2020	Jared Harper	Phoenix Suns	

=== Subtractions ===
Date	Player	New team	Ref
June 29, 2019	Lance Thomas	Brooklyn Nets	
July 3, 2019	Mario Hezonja	Portland Trail Blazers	
July 6, 2019	DeAndre Jordan	Brooklyn Nets	
July 8, 2019	Noah Vonleh	Minnesota Timberwolves	
July 17, 2019	Henry Ellenson	Brooklyn Nets	
July 18, 2019	Luke Kornet	Chicago Bulls	
July 20, 2019	Emmanuel Mudiay	Utah Jazz	
July 25, 2019	Billy Garrett Jr.	Élan Chalon	
August 4, 2019	Isaiah Hicks	Avtodor Saratov	
October 16, 2019	Amir Hinton	Westchester Knicks	
October 18, 2019	Zak Irvin	Westchester Knicks	
October 19, 2019	V. J. King	Westchester Knicks	
October 19, 2019	Lamar Peters	Westchester Knicks	
October 19, 2019	Kenny Wooten	Westchester Knicks	
January 13, 2020	Ivan Rabb	Westchester Knicks	
June 23, 2020	Allonzo Trier	Iowa Wolves	
June 26, 2020	Kadeem Allen	JL Bourg	
