= Mitchell Robinson =

American basketball player (born 1998)

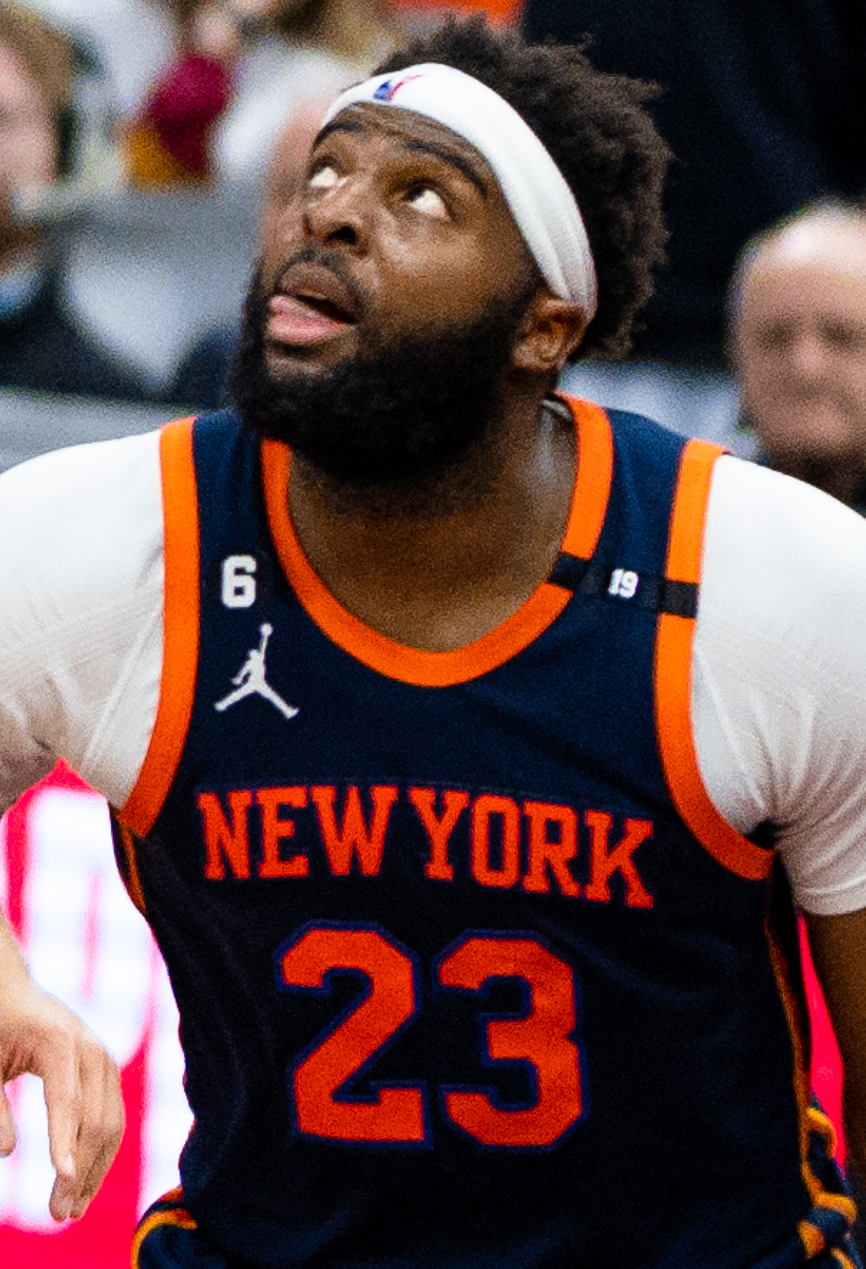
- Robinson with the New York Knicks in 2023

No. 4 – Boston Celtics
- Position: Center / power forward
- League: NBA

Personal information
- Born: April 1, 1998 (age 28) Pensacola, Florida, U.S.
- Listed height: 7 ft 0 in (2.13 m)
- Listed weight: 245 lb (111 kg)

Career information
- High school: Pine Forest (Pensacola, Florida); Chalmette (Chalmette, Louisiana)
- NBA draft: 2018: 2nd round, 36th overall pick
- Drafted by: New York Knicks
- Playing career: 2018–present

Career history
- 2018–2026: New York Knicks
- 2026–present: Boston Celtics

Career highlights
- NBA champion (2026); NBA Cup champion (2025); NBA All-Rookie Second Team (2019); McDonald's All-American (2017)
- Stats at NBA.com
- Stats at Basketball Reference

Mitchell Robinson III (born April 1, 1998) is an American professional basketball player for the Boston Celtics of the National Basketball Association (NBA). Before beginning his professional career, he gained national coverage for withdrawing from his commitment to attend Western Kentucky University to instead dedicate the entire 2017–18 season to training on his own, being the first player to make such a decision. Robinson was selected by the New York Knicks with the 36th overall pick in the 2018 NBA draft. He won the NBA Finals with the Knicks in 2026.

== High school career ==
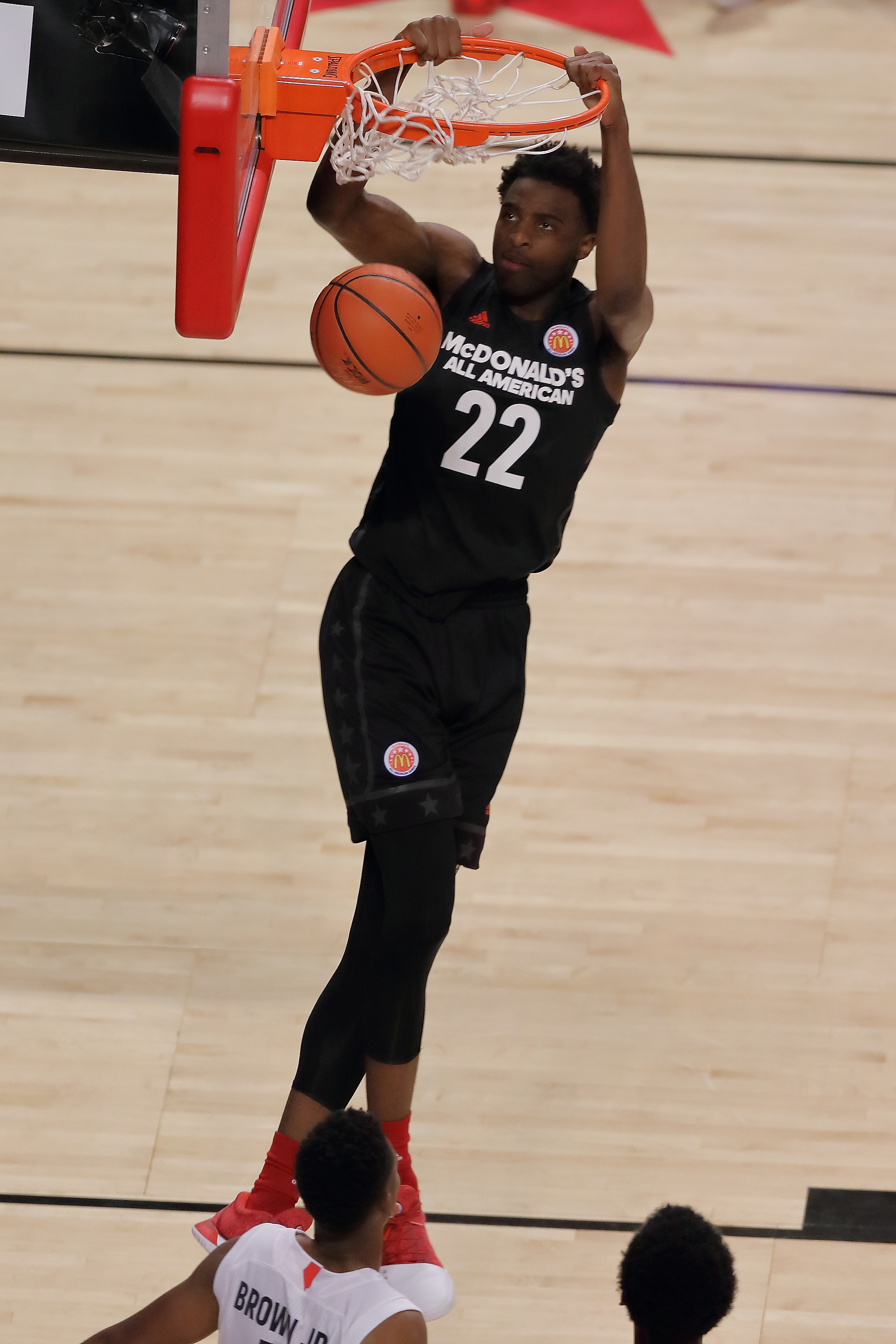
Robinson at the 2017 McDonald's All-American Game

Mitchell Robinson attended Pine Forest High School in Pensacola, Florida, for the first two years of his high school career, briefly transferring to Landry-Walker College and Career Preparatory High School in New Orleans as a sophomore, for whom he never played. He did appear for Pine Forest as a freshman and sophomore, but did not make much of an impact, as he was still relatively new to basketball, only starting playing in eighth grade, during a growth spurt that took him from 6 ft 2 in (1.88 m) to 7 ft 0 in (2.13 m). He first appeared in the summer league before his junior year for Chalmette High School.

As a junior, Robinson led the Owls to their first state playoff win in 19 years, and in the second round, helped give the first seed and eventual state champion Natchitoches Central High School all they could handle before bowing out, their closest playoff game until the state final. He averaged 20.9 points, 13.6 rebounds, 8.1 blocks, and 2 steals per game. He made the all-district, all-Metro, and all-State teams for his efforts. Robinson then joined Dallas-based Nike Pro Skills on the AAU circuit for the summer, winning individual honors in the Nike EYBL and leading Pro Skills to the season-ending Peach Jam. His recruiting ranking shot up, and he earned his fifth star. Against the top players in the country, Robinson averaged 15.5 points, 11.6 rebounds, and 4.1 blocks per game, being named to the All-EYBL second team.

As a senior at Chalmette, Robinson averaged 25.7 points, 12.6 rebounds, and six blocks per game, while earning Naismith Trophy All-America honorable mention and MaxPreps All-America honorable mention status as well as USA Today All-USA Louisiana first team honors and being named All-District, All-Metro, All-State, and the All-Metro Player of the Year from the New Orleans Advocate, as well as the St. Bernard Post Male Athlete of the Year for the parish. He led Chalmette to their first district championship in their own regular season tournament in 20 years, first district title in 21 years in the toughest basketball district in the state, and to the state semifinals for the first time in 32 years. In the Owls' four-game state playoff run, Robinson averaged 34.5 points, 13.5 rebounds, and 7.8 blocks. Robinson became the first Chalmette basketball player to be named a McDonald's All-American, and also played in the Jordan Brand Classic and the LHSBCA All-Star game.

Playing in the 2017 McDonald's All-American Boys Game, Robinson tallied 14 points, three rebounds, and two blocks. He participated in the 2017 Jordan Brand Classic, scoring 15 points in 17 minutes of play, while pulling down three rebounds.

Robinson originally committed to play college basketball at Texas A&M, but de-committed to follow coach Rick Stansbury to Western Kentucky. Stansbury had recruited Robinson as the Aggies' assistant coach. Basketball writer Jason Frakes wrote in February 2017, Robinson "may go down as the biggest recruiting coup in WKU basketball history."

== College career ==
In July 2017, Robinson enrolled at Western Kentucky University for the summer semester, and practiced with the team for about two weeks before a planned team trip to Costa Rica. Sources then indicated that he had left campus and his room was cleaned out. He was then suspended indefinitely for violating the team rules. After speaking with head coach Rick Stansbury, he was granted a release to transfer, and barring an unexpected decision by the NCAA, would have had to sit out the 2017–18 season.

With the hope that a waiver would be granted by the NCAA, Robinson took visits to Louisiana State University, the University of Kansas, and the University of New Orleans in August 2017. On August 27, Robinson returned to Western Kentucky a month after leaving campus.

On September 18, Robinson announced he would forgo college and prepare for the 2018 NBA draft on his own accord. He would be the first recruited draft pick to not play for any college, professional, or high school/postgraduate team throughout an entire year before entering an NBA draft, though the NBA would still credit him as coming out of Western Kentucky. Further, because of his brief time in summer classes at Western Kentucky, League rules barred him from participating in the NBA G League later in the season. The ruling also affected a few similar prospects stuck in difficult situations at the time as well, like Billy Preston and De'Anthony Melton. The announcement also influenced at least one person to train by himself for a year before entering an NBA draft, as fellow five-star recruit Darius Bazley originally planned on not going to college at Syracuse University to try out for the NBA G League before deciding against that as well.

Robinson was one of 69 players who planned to participate in the NBA Draft Combine. However, on the day of the combine, Robinson withdrew from all events.

== Professional career ==
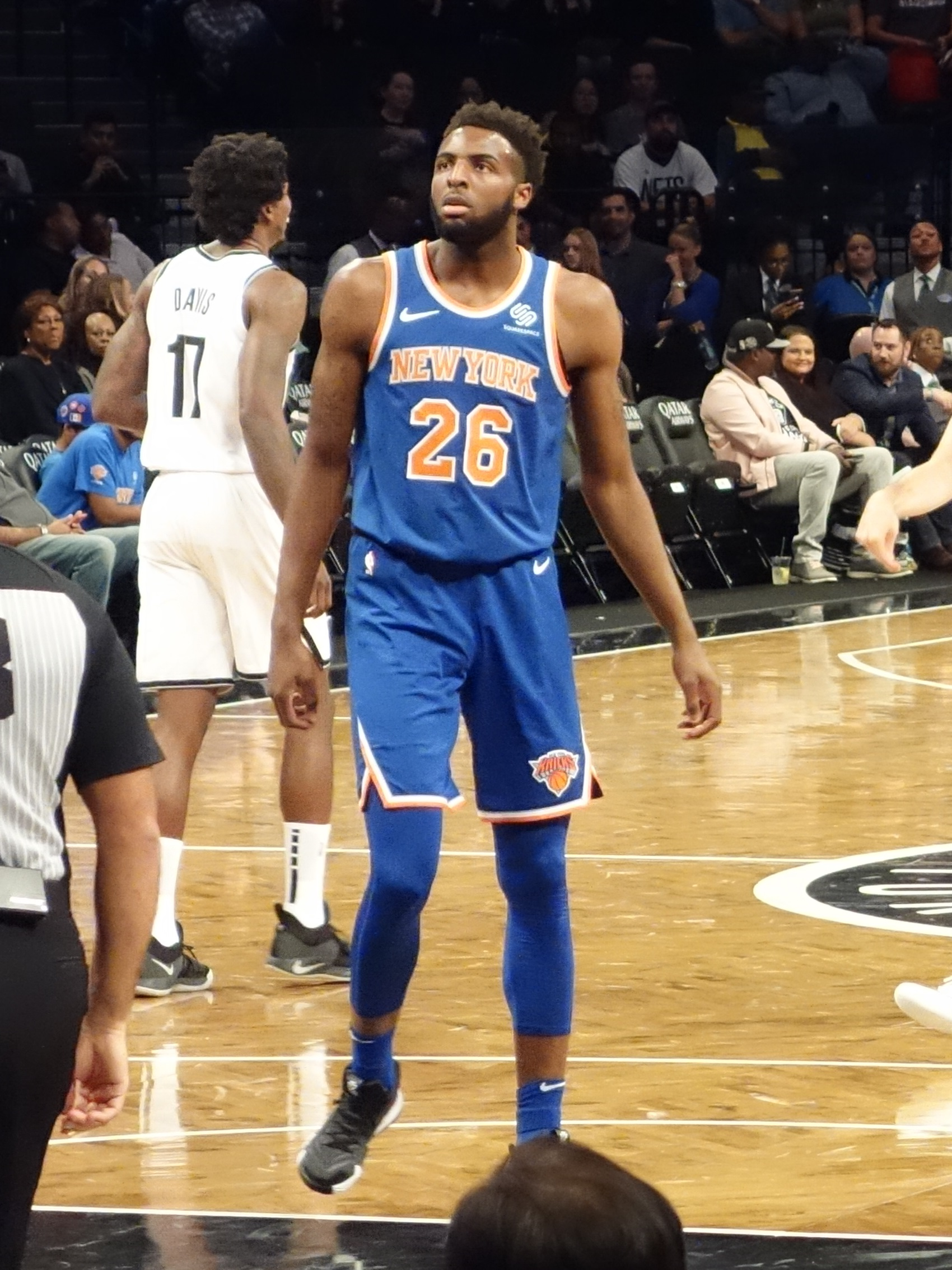
Robinson in 2018

=== New York Knicks (2018–2026) ===
==== 2018–21: Early seasons ====
On June 21, 2018, Robinson was selected with the 36th overall pick in the 2018 NBA draft by the New York Knicks. After appearing for the Knicks in the 2018 NBA Summer League, where he set summer league records for blocked shots and offensive rebounds, he signed a multi-year, rookie-scale contract with the Knicks on July 8, 2018. After struggling with an ankle injury during the preseason, Robinson made his professional debut on October 17, scoring two points in a 127–106 win against the Atlanta Hawks. Robinson made his first start on October 26, recording seven points and six rebounds in 29 minutes of action in a 128–100 loss to the Golden State Warriors. On November 2, Robinson recorded his first double-double with 13 points and 10 rebounds, alongside three assists and three steals, in a 118–106 win over the Dallas Mavericks. On November 11, Robinson set the Knicks' rookie record with nine blocks in a 115–89 loss to the Orlando Magic. On March 28, 2019, Robinson recorded season highs of 19 points and 21 rebounds in the Knicks' 117–92 loss to the Toronto Raptors, and became the first Knicks rookie since Willis Reed in 1965 to record 19 points and 21 rebounds in a game. On April 9, he recorded eight points and 17 rebounds in a 96–86 win over the Chicago Bulls. Robinson finished the season second in the NBA in blocks per game, behind only Myles Turner of the Indiana Pacers, and was named to the All-Rookie Second Team.

On December 17, 2019, Robinson scored a career-high 22 points and recorded 13 rebounds in a 143–120 win against the Atlanta Hawks. On January 1, 2020, Robinson scored 22 points on perfect 11-of-11 shooting from the field in a 117–93 win against the Portland Trail Blazers. On February 26, Robinson recorded a double-double with 12 points and a season-high 16 rebounds in a 108–101 loss to the Charlotte Hornets. When the 2019–20 regular season finished, Robinson broke Wilt Chamberlain's league record for highest field goal percentage in a single season.

On February 12, 2021, in the Knicks' game against the Washington Wizards, Robinson fractured his right hand during the second quarter and did not return after halftime. In 72 games (including 62 starts) for the team, he averaged 8.5 points, 8.6 rebounds, and 0.5 assists.

==== 2021–26: Winning years and NBA championship ====
On July 12, 2022, Robinson re-signed with the Knicks on a four-year, $60 million contract. On November 30, he scored 15 points and grabbed 20 rebounds during a 109–103 loss to the Milwaukee Bucks. Robinson made 59 appearances (58 starts) for New York during the 2022–23 NBA season, recording averages of 7.4 points, 9.4 rebounds, and 0.9 assists. In the 2023–24 season, Robinson appeared in 31 games (starting 21) for the Knicks, averaging 5.6 points, 8.5 rebounds, and 0.6 assists.

On September 23, 2024, it was announced that Robinson would miss the beginning of the regular season after offseason ankle surgery. On February 28, 2025, Robinson returned and put up six points and five rebounds in a 114–113 win over the Memphis Grizzlies. In his injury-truncated season, Robinson logged averages of 5.1 points and 5.9 rebounds over 17 games.

On March 13, 2026, Robinson put up a career-high 22 rebounds in a 101–92 win over the Indiana Pacers. In 60 appearances (including 16 starts) for the Knicks, he averaged 5.7 points, 8.8 rebounds, and 0.9 assists. On May 29, prior to the team's appearance in the 2026 NBA Finals, it was announced that Robinson had undergone surgery to repair a broken right pinkie finger. In Game 2 of the NBA Finals, Robinson's defense on Victor Wembanyama's final shot helped lead the Knicks to a 105–104 win over the San Antonio Spurs. In Game 5, Robinson helped the Knicks achieve a 94–90 win and close out the NBA Finals against the Spurs with a game-sealing offensive rebound, winning 4–1 and securing the Knicks' first NBA championship in 53 years.

=== Boston Celtics (2026–present) ===
On July 6, 2026, Robinson signed a three-year, $47.4 million contract with the Boston Celtics. He made his debut for the team on October 20, recording four points, three rebounds and two blocks in a 121–113 loss to the Detroit Pistons.

== National team career ==
Robinson was named to the preliminary roster of the United States national under-19 team in 2017, but did not make the final cut for the 12-man squad for the 2017 FIBA Under-19 Basketball World Cup.

At the tryout, Robinson measured 7 ft 0 in (2.13 m) without shoes, 7 ft 1 in (2.16 m) with shoes, 223 pounds (101 kg), with a 7 ft 4 in (2.24 m) wingspan and 9 ft 3 in (2.82 m) standing reach.

== Player profile ==
Robinson has been called by some analysts "the best shot blocker in his class", with uncommon closing speed and a long reach that led to numerous highlight-reel blocks. He uses that speed also to run the fast break exceptionally well for a big man of his size, being called the "most entertaining player" in the New Orleans area for his ability to convert alley-oop dunks. Robinson improved his free throw shooting performance over the course of his two years at Chalmette High School, and developed range from behind the three-point line, making as many as five in a game. Prior to Robinson's joining the NBA, draft projections compared his game to DeAndre Jordan and Tyson Chandler.

Since entering the NBA in 2018, Robinson’s shot diet has consisted completely of dunks and layups. He has neither made nor attempted any three-point shots during his NBA career. His primary strength is his offensive rebounding ability, with offensive rebounding rates that rank the highest in NBA history.

Robinson has been noted for his exceptionally poor free throw shooting. His career free throw percentage is the lowest in NBA history. During the Knicks’ championship-winning 2025-26 season, Robinson shot 40.8% from the line. His 2025-26 playoff free throw percentage—29.3%—was the lowest in NBA playoff history. Basketball commentators have attributed Robinson’s unusually poor free throw performance to his habit of shooting with “zero arc” from the line. Other teams have exploited Robinson's poor free-throw performance by employing a "Hack-a-Mitch" tactic, intentionally fouling Robinson to send him to the free throw line and get possession of the ball.

== Personal life ==
Robinson lives in White Plains, New York and has a daughter named Riley, born in 2023. Robinson is a truck enthusiast and has multiple custom pickup trucks. Robinson also enjoys listening to country music. Robinson is a registered Republican but has denied supporting President Donald Trump.

== Career statistics ==
Legend
GP	Games played	GS	Games started	MPG	Minutes per game
FG%	Field goal percentage	3P%	3-point field goal percentage	FT%	Free throw percentage
RPG	Rebounds per game	APG	Assists per game	SPG	Steals per game
BPG	Blocks per game	PPG	Points per game	**Bold**	Career high
†	Won an NBA championship	‡	NBA record

=== NBA ===
==== Regular season ====
Year	Team	GP	GS	MPG	FG%	3P%	FT%	RPG	APG	SPG	BPG	PPG
2018–19	New York	66	19	20.6	.694	—	.600	6.4	.6	.8	**2.4**	7.3
2019–20	New York	61	7	23.2	.742	—	.568	7.0	.6	.9	2.0	**9.7**
2020–21	New York	31	29	**27.5**	.653	—	.491	8.1	.5	1.1	1.5	8.3
2021–22	New York	**72**	**62**	25.7	**.761**‡	—	.486	8.6	.5	.8	1.8	8.5
2022–23	New York	59	58	26.9	.671	—	.484	**9.4**	**.9**	.9	1.8	7.4
2023–24	New York	31	21	24.8	.575	—	.409	8.5	.6	**1.2**	1.1	5.6
2024–25	New York	17	3	17.1	.661	—	**.684**	5.9	.8	.9	1.1	5.1
2025–26†	New York	60	16	19.6	.723	—	.408	8.8	**.9**	.9	1.2	5.7
Career		397	215	23.4	.702	—	.508	8.0	.7	.9	1.7	7.5

==== Playoffs ====
Year	Team	GP	GS	MPG	FG%	3P%	FT%	RPG	APG	SPG	BPG	PPG
2023	New York	11	**11**	**27.1**	.604	—	**.394**	**9.3**	**.8**	.7	**1.5**	**6.5**
2024	New York	6	0	19.1	.500	—	.375	6.8	.5	**1.0**	1.2	2.8
2025	New York	**18**	4	20.6	.608	—	.393	7.1	.4	.9	.8	4.7
2026†	New York	**18**	0	13.9	**.673**	—	.293	5.5	.4	.4	.6	4.8
Career		53	15	19.5	.618	—	.355	7.0	.5	.7	.9	4.9
