= Elfrid Payton =

American basketball player (born 1994)

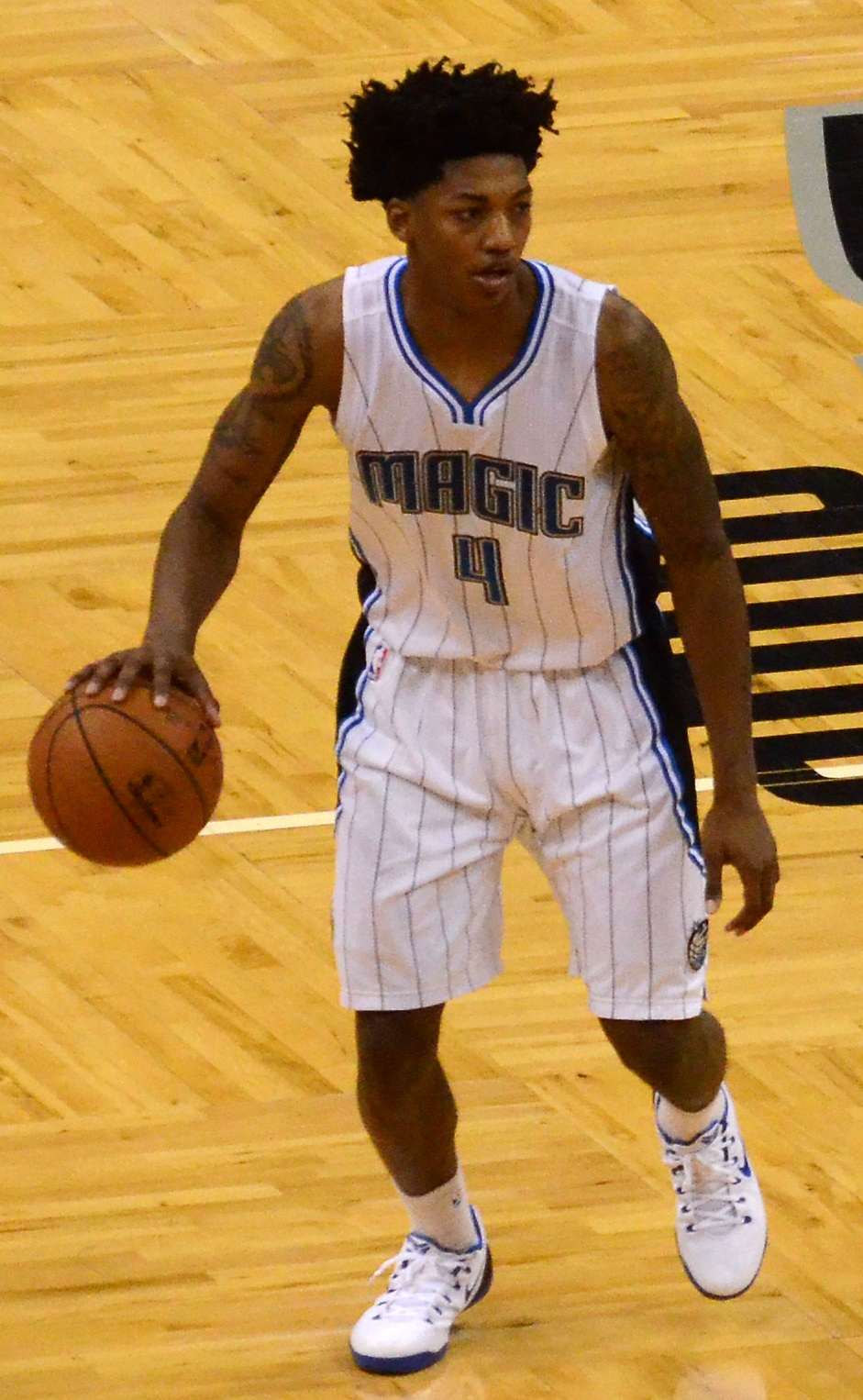
- Payton with the Orlando Magic in 2014

Free agent
- Position: Point guard

Personal information
- Born: February 22, 1994 (age 32) Gretna, Louisiana, U.S.
- Listed height: 6 ft 3 in (1.91 m)
- Listed weight: 195 lb (88 kg)

Career information
- High school: John Ehret (Jefferson Parish, Louisiana)
- College: Louisiana (2011–2014)
- NBA draft: 2014: 1st round, 10th overall pick
- Drafted by: Philadelphia 76ers
- Playing career: 2014–present

Career history
- 2014–2018: Orlando Magic
- 2018: Phoenix Suns
- 2018–2019: New Orleans Pelicans
- 2019–2021: New York Knicks
- 2021–2022: Phoenix Suns
- 2023: Fort Wayne Mad Ants
- 2023: Osos de Manatí
- 2023–2024: Indiana Mad Ants
- 2024–2025: Birmingham Squadron
- 2024: New Orleans Pelicans
- 2025: Charlotte Hornets
- 2025: New Orleans Pelicans
- 2025–2026: Austin Spurs

Career highlights
- NBA All-Rookie First Team (2015); All–NBA G League Third Team (2024); Lefty Driesell Award (2014); Sun Belt Defensive Player of the Year (2014); 2× First-team All-Sun Belt (2013, 2014)
- Stats at NBA.com
- Stats at Basketball Reference
Medals
Representing the United States
FIBA World U19 Championship
Gold medal – first place	2013 Czech Republic	National team

Elfrid Payton Jr. (born February 22, 1994) is an American professional basketball player who last played for the Austin Spurs of the NBA G League. He played college basketball for the Louisiana Ragin' Cajuns, winning the Lefty Driesell Award as the national college defensive player of the year in 2014. Payton was selected by the Philadelphia 76ers with the 10th overall pick in the 2014 NBA draft before being traded to the Orlando Magic.

== College career ==
Payton was an unheralded recruit from John Ehret High School in Jefferson Parish, Louisiana. He chose to attend Louisiana–Lafayette, and after a promising freshman season in 2011–12, Payton came into his own as a sophomore in 2012–13. He averaged 15.9 points, 5.6 rebounds, 5.5 assists and 2.4 steals per game and was named first team All-Sun Belt Conference.

After his breakout sophomore season, Payton was a late addition to Team USA's U19 World Championships Trials Roster to compete in the 2013 FIBA Under-19 World Championship. After making the team, Payton started in all nine games for Team USA, on a team loaded with talent including other players such as Marcus Smart, Aaron Gordon, Jahlil Okafor and Jarnell Stokes. The team ultimately defeated the Serbian team led by Vasilije Micić and won the gold medal, going 9–0 in the tournament.

As a junior in 2013–14, Payton emerged as one of the top defensive players in college basketball. He raised his averages to 19.2 points, 5.9 assists, 6.0 rebounds and 2.3 steals per game and led the Ragin' Cajuns to the 2014 NCAA Tournament. He was again named first team All-Sun Belt and was the conference Defensive Player of the Year. At the end of the season, he was named the National Defensive Player of the Year by winning the Lefty Driesell Award.

In April 2014, Payton declared for the NBA draft, forgoing his final year of college eligibility.

== Professional career ==
=== Orlando Magic (2014–2018) ===
==== 2014–15 season ====
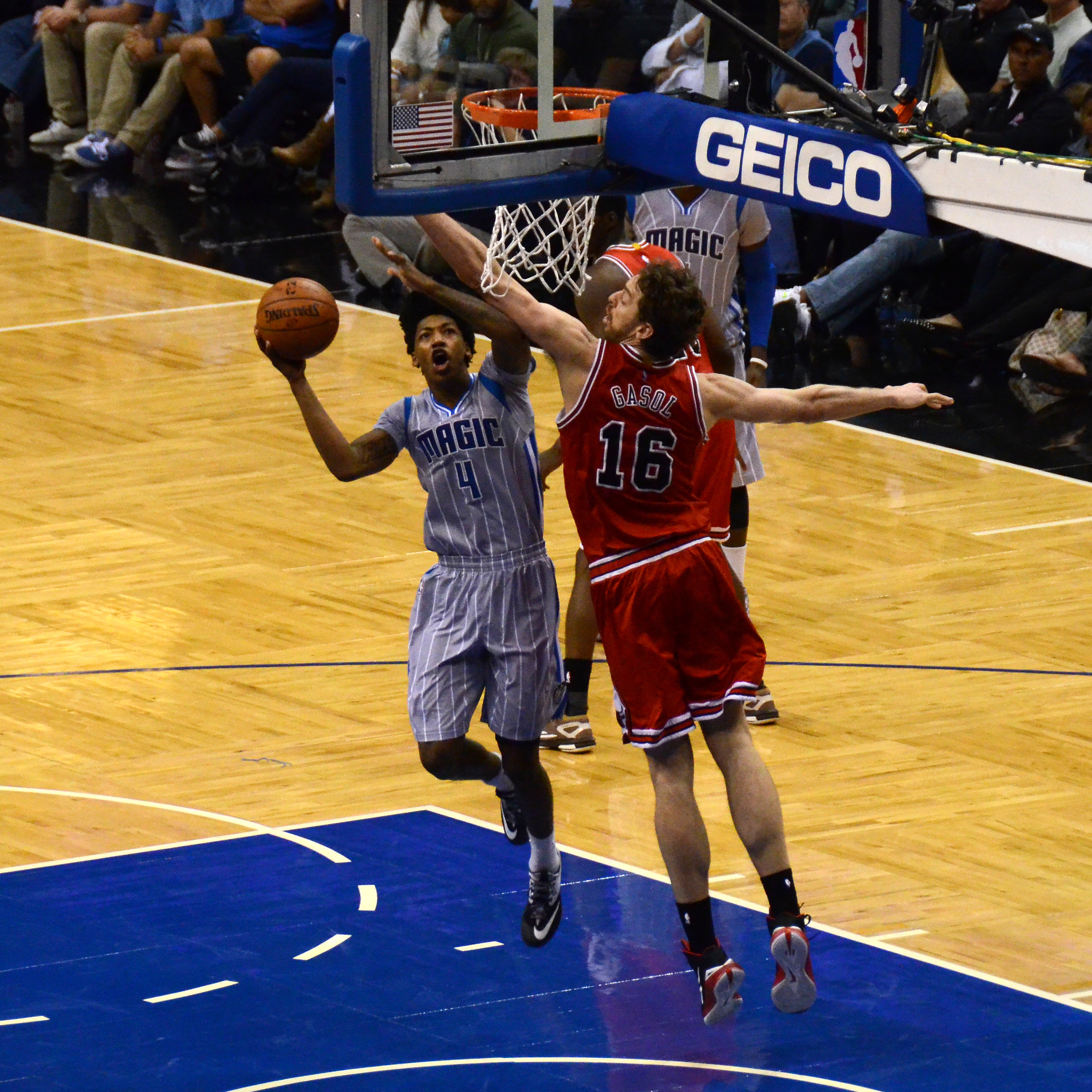
Payton in February 2015, attacking the basket against Pau Gasol

On June 26, 2014, Payton was selected with the 10th overall pick in the 2014 NBA draft by the Philadelphia 76ers. He was traded to the Orlando Magic on draft night for Dario Šarić, a future first-round pick, and a future second-round pick. On July 2, he signed his rookie scale contract with the Magic. He made his NBA debut on October 29, 2014, in a loss to the New Orleans Pelicans. On January 16, 2015, Payton had a season-best game with 22 points and 12 assists in a loss to the Memphis Grizzlies. He was subsequently named the Eastern Conference Rookie of the Month for January and was named a Rising Stars Challenge participant. On March 18, he recorded his first career triple-double with 15 points, 12 assists and 10 rebounds in a loss to the Dallas Mavericks. With a second straight triple-double recorded by Payton on March 20, he became the first Magic player to post consecutive triple-doubles and the first NBA rookie to do it since Antoine Walker, with the Boston Celtics in 1997. Payton's 22 points, 10 rebounds and 10 assists helped the Magic claim a 111–104 win over the Portland Trail Blazers.

==== 2015–16 season ====
On November 18, 2015, Payton scored a then career-high 24 points in a 104–101 win over the Minnesota Timberwolves. Payton appeared in 116 straight games to begin his career before a left ankle injury forced him to sit out four games in early January 2016. He returned to action on January 14 in London to face the Toronto Raptors, coming off the bench for the first time in 2015–16 and recording four points and four rebounds in a 106–103 overtime loss. On March 23, 2016, he recorded his third career triple-double with 20 points, 10 rebounds and 10 assists in a 118–102 loss to the Detroit Pistons.

==== 2016–17 season ====
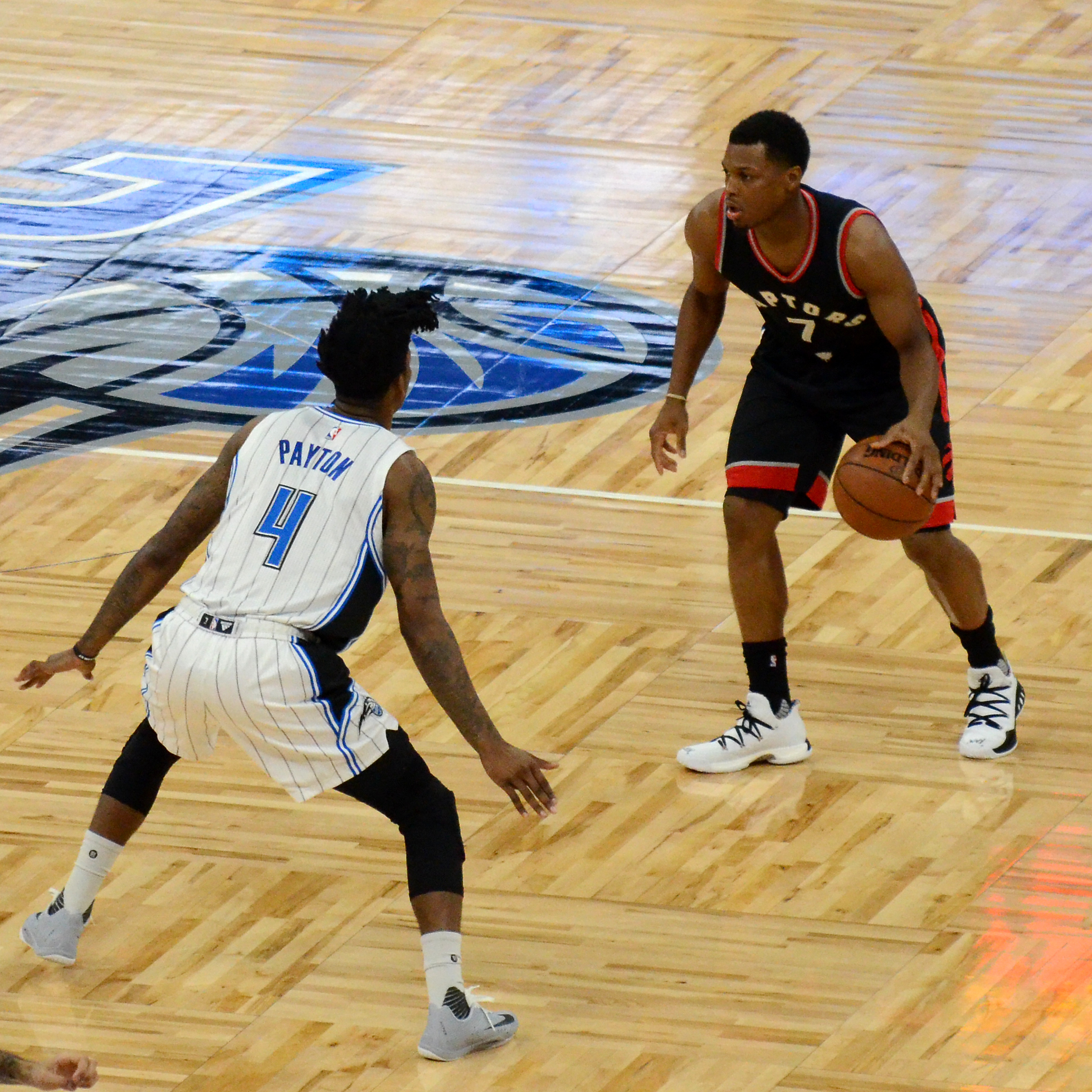
Payton defending Kyle Lowry in February 2017

On December 6, 2016, Payton scored 22 of his career-high 25 points in the first half of the Magic's 124–116 win over the Washington Wizards. He bested that mark on December 13, 2016, recording career highs with 26 points and 14 assists in a 131–120 win over the Atlanta Hawks. On January 14, 2017, he had a career-high 28 points and added nine rebounds and nine assists in a 114–107 loss to the Utah Jazz. On March 6, 2017, he had his first triple-double of the season with 16 points, 10 assists and 11 rebounds in a 113–105 loss to the New York Knicks. Two days later, he had his second straight triple-double with 22 points, 14 rebounds and 14 assists in a 98–91 win over the Chicago Bulls. On March 13, 2017, in a 120–115 loss to the Sacramento Kings, Payton had 13 points, 13 assists and 10 rebounds for his third triple-double of the season. On March 24, he continued his impressive run with 14 points, 11 rebounds and 10 assists in a 115–87 win over the Detroit Pistons. It was his fourth triple-double in 10 games and seventh of his career. Seven days later, he recorded a career-high 15 assists to go with 12 points and nine rebounds in a 117–116 loss to the Boston Celtics. On April 1, he had 20 points, 11 assists and 11 rebounds for his fifth triple-double of the season in the Magic's 121–111 loss to the Brooklyn Nets.

==== 2017–18 season ====
Payton missed eight games early on the season 2017–18 season because of a left hamstring injury. An important piece in the Magic's offense, he had 11 points and 11 assists in 29 minutes in his return on November 8, helping the team end a two-game losing streak with a 112–99 win over the New York Knicks. On November 22, he had a season-high 13 assists in a 124–118 loss to the Minnesota Timberwolves. On December 23, 2017, he scored a career-high 30 points in a 130–103 loss to the Washington Wizards.

=== Phoenix Suns (2018) ===
On February 8, 2018, Payton was traded to the Phoenix Suns in exchange for a 2018 second-round pick. He made his debut for the Suns two days later, recording 19 points, nine assists and six rebounds in 35 minutes in a 123–113 loss to the Denver Nuggets. In his second game for the Suns on February 12, Payton scored a game-high 29 points in a 129–83 loss to the Golden State Warriors. Two days later, he had a triple-double with 13 points, 11 rebounds and 12 assists in a 107–97 loss to the Utah Jazz. On March 4, 2018, he had 11 points, 10 rebounds and a season-high 14 assists in a 113–112 loss to the Atlanta Hawks. It was his second triple-double in nine games with the Suns—his nine games needed with the team to record two triple-doubles are the fewest ever by a Suns player.

=== New Orleans Pelicans (2018–2019) ===
On July 9, 2018, Payton signed with his hometown team the New Orleans Pelicans. In his debut for the Pelicans in their season opener on October 17, 2018, Payton recorded 10 points, 10 rebounds and 10 assists in a 131–112 win over the Houston Rockets. Payton's minimalist triple-double made him the first player to record exactly 10 points, 10 rebounds and 10 assists in a single game since March 2, 2013, when Kyle Lowry did it for Toronto. It was Payton's 11th career triple-double. On November 16, against the New York Knicks, Payton returned to the lineup after missing nine games with a sprained right ankle, only to fracture a finger in his left hand after eight minutes on the court. He was subsequently ruled out for approximately six weeks. He returned to action on December 31 against the Minnesota Timberwolves after a 22-game absence. In his second game back on January 2, he scored 25 points in a 126–121 loss to the Brooklyn Nets. On March 10, he had 15 points, 10 rebounds and 10 assists in a 128–116 loss to the Atlanta Hawks. On March 12, he had his second consecutive triple-double with 14 points, a career-high 15 rebounds and 11 assists in a 130–113 loss to the Milwaukee Bucks, becoming the first New Orleans player to have a triple-double in consecutive games since Chris Paul in 2008. On March 15, he had his third consecutive triple-double with 14 points, 12 rebounds and a career-high 16 assists in a 122–110 loss to the Portland Trail Blazers. The next day, he recorded his fourth straight triple-double with 16 points, 16 assists and 13 rebounds in a 138–136 overtime loss to the Phoenix Suns, joining James Harden, Magic Johnson, Michael Jordan and Russell Westbrook as the only players since the 1983–84 season to record triple-doubles in as many as four straight games, and eighth in NBA history. Payton recorded his fifth consecutive triple-double two days later with 19 points, 11 assists and 10 rebounds in a 129–125 overtime win over the Dallas Mavericks. He also tied Chris Paul for most triple-doubles in a season in franchise history with six, and became only the fifth player to record five consecutive triple-doubles, joining Wilt Chamberlain, Michael Jordan, Oscar Robertson, and Russell Westbrook.

=== New York Knicks (2019–2021) ===
On July 9, 2019, Payton signed a reported two-year deal with the New York Knicks. He struggled with injuries early in the season, missing 17 straight games. Upon returning, he provided playmaking ability the Knicks were lacking and was promoted to the starting lineup. On January 31, 2020, Payton received a one-game suspension for pushing Jae Crowder in a January 29 game against the Memphis Grizzlies. On February 3, Payton recorded the 17th triple-double of his career with 17 points, 11 rebounds and 15 assists in a 139–134 overtime win over the Cleveland Cavaliers. In the next game, on February 6, he recorded 15 points, nine assists and a career-high seven steals in a 105–103 win over the Orlando Magic. On November 19, 2020, the Knicks waived Payton. On November 29, Payton was re-signed by the Knicks to a reported one-year contract.

=== Return to Phoenix (2021–2022) ===
On August 10, 2021, Payton signed with the Phoenix Suns.

=== Fort Wayne Mad Ants (2023) ===
On February 6, 2023, it was reported that Payton would sign with Osos de Manatí of the Baloncesto Superior Nacional. Two days later on February 8, 2023, the Fort Wayne Mad Ants announced that they had acquired the player right to Payton.

=== Osos de Manatí (2023) ===
On March 31, 2023, Payton signed with Osos de Manatí of the Puerto Rican league.

=== Indiana Mad Ants (2023–2024) ===
On September 29, 2023, Payton signed with the Indiana Pacers, but was waived a day later. On October 15, he signed with the Cairns Taipans for a single game as an 'emergency replacement' player and came off the bench against the Toronto Raptors in a NBLxNBA preseason game.

On October 28, 2023, Payton joined the Indiana Mad Ants. During the 2023–24 season, he led the NBA G League in assists per game and earned All–NBA G League Third Team honors, helping the Mad Ants reach the 2024 playoffs. On October 3, 2024, as a result of Payton signing a training camp deal with the New Orleans Pelicans, the Mad Ants traded his rights to the Birmingham Squadron for the rights to Landers Nolley II.

=== New Orleans Pelicans / Birmingham Squadron (2024–2025) ===
On October 11, 2024, Payton signed with the New Orleans Pelicans, but was waived five days later. On October 28, he joined the Birmingham Squadron and on November 20, he re-signed with the Pelicans. He immediately moved into the starting lineup for the Pelicans' game that night against the Cleveland Cavaliers, recording 11 points, five rebounds, and eight assists in 22 minutes in a 128–100 loss. On November 25, Payton recorded a career high of 21 assists in a 114–110 loss against the Indiana Pacers. On December 3, he was waived by the Pelicans and four days later, he rejoined Birmingham.

=== Charlotte Hornets (2025) ===
On February 7, 2025, Payton signed a 10-day contract with the Charlotte Hornets. On February 18, he signed a second 10-day contract with the Hornets. In six total games for the Hornets, he averaged 1.0 point, 2.2 rebounds, and 3.3 assists.

=== New Orleans Pelicans (2025) ===
On March 21, 2025, Payton signed a 10-day contract with the New Orleans Pelicans, for his third stint with the Pelicans during the season. During his first seven games with the franchise in the season, Payton was averaging 6.7 points, 6.9 assists, 3.4 rebounds, 1.4 steals and 2.9 turnovers. On April 2, Payton signed a second 10-day contract with the Pelicans. On April 11, Payton re-signed with New Orleans on a two-year standard contract, enabling him to play in the team's season finale against the Oklahoma City Thunder.

On September 16, 2026, Payton signed a one–year, non–guaranteed contract with the Sacramento Kings for training camp. Payton was released by Sacramento on October 18.

== National team career ==
In the summer of 2013, Payton was a surprise selection to the U.S. team for the 2013 FIBA Under-19 World Championship. He averaged 6.1 points and 3.3 rebounds per game in nine games.

== Career statistics ==
Legend
GP	Games played	GS	Games started	MPG	Minutes per game
FG%	Field goal percentage	3P%	3-point field goal percentage	FT%	Free throw percentage
RPG	Rebounds per game	APG	Assists per game	SPG	Steals per game
BPG	Blocks per game	PPG	Points per game	**Bold**	Career high
*	Led the league

=== NBA ===
==== Regular season ====
Year	Team	GP	GS	MPG	FG%	3P%	FT%	RPG	APG	SPG	BPG	PPG
2014–15	Orlando	**82**	63	**30.3**	.425	.262	.551	4.3	6.5	**1.7**	.2	8.9
2015–16	Orlando	73	**69**	29.4	.436	.326	.589	3.6	6.4	1.2	.3	10.7
2016–17	Orlando	**82***	58	29.4	.471	.274	.692	4.7	6.5	1.1	**.5**	12.8
2017–18	Orlando	44	44	28.6	**.520**	**.373**	.632	4.0	6.3	1.5	.4	**13.0**
2017–18	Phoenix	19	19	29.0	.435	.200	.685	**5.3**	6.2	1.0	.3	11.8
2018–19	New Orleans	42	42	29.8	.434	.314	**.743**	5.2	**7.6**	1.0	.4	10.6
2019–20	New York	45	36	27.7	.439	.203	.570	4.7	7.2	1.6	.4	10.0
2020–21	New York	63	63	23.6	.432	.286	.682	3.4	3.2	.7	.1	10.1
2021–22	Phoenix	50	1	11.0	.383	.222	.375	1.8	2.0	.5	.1	3.0
2024–25	New Orleans	7	3	20.5	.500	.000	.500	3.4	6.9	1.4	.4	6.7
2024–25	Charlotte	6	2	20.6	.143	—	—	2.2	3.3	1.0	.5	1.0
Career		513	400	26.6	.446	.287	.623	4.0	5.7	1.2	.3	9.9

==== Playoffs ====
Year	Team	GP	GS	MPG	FG%	3P%	FT%	RPG	APG	SPG	BPG	PPG
2021	New York	**2**	**2**	**6.5**	.000	—	.500	.0	.5	**.5**	.0	.5
2022	Phoenix	**2**	0	3.8	**.667**	—	—	.0	**1.5**	.0	.0	**2.0**
Career		4	2	5.2	.250	—	.500	.0	1.0	.3	.0	1.3

=== College ===
Year	Team	GP	GS	MPG	FG%	3P%	FT%	RPG	APG	SPG	BPG	PPG
2011–12	Louisiana	32	10	22.7	.448	.000	.564	3.6	3.0	1.2	.3	7.2
2012–13	Louisiana	33	33	35.5	.475	**.320**	**.643**	5.6	5.5	**2.4**	**.6**	15.9
2013–14	Louisiana	**35**	**35**	**35.9**	**.509**	.259	.609	**6.0**	**5.9**	2.3	**.6**	**19.2**
Career		100	78	31.6	.485	.268	.611	5.1	4.9	2.0	.5	14.3

== Personal life ==
Payton is the son of former Canadian Football League player Elfrid Payton.

Payton was well known for his free-flowing hairstyle during his first four seasons in the NBA, before cutting his hair in May 2018. During his time with the Orlando Magic, his hairdo made him a fan favorite.
