= Terrence Mann (disambiguation) =

Terance, Terence, or Terrence Mann may refer to:

- Terrence Mann (born 1951), American actor, singer, and director
- Terance Mann (born 1996), American professional basketball player
- Terence Mann, fictional character in the movie Field of Dreams
