= Reggie Jackson (basketball, born 1990) =

American basketball player (born 1990)

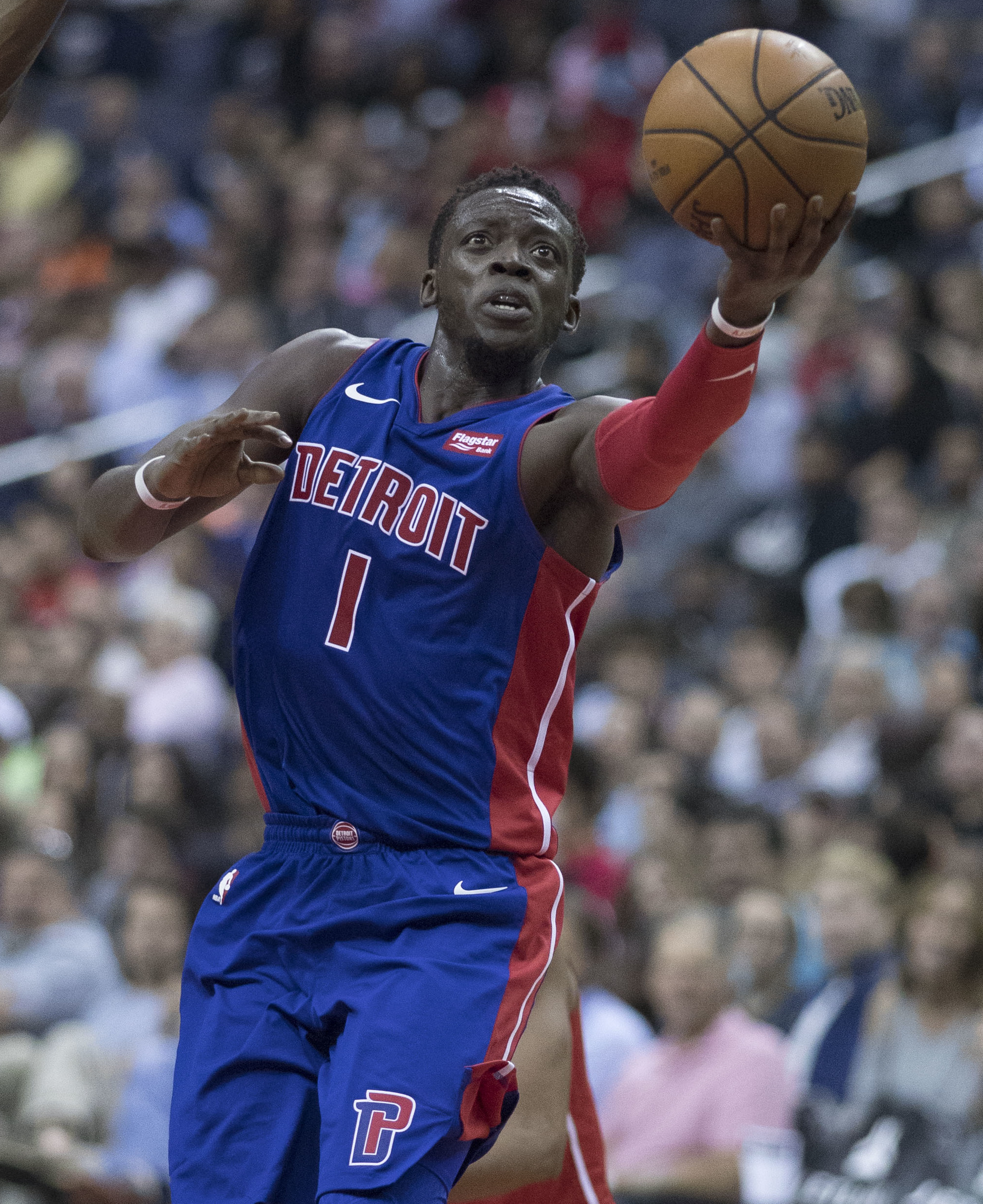
- Jackson with the Detroit Pistons in 2017

Free agent
- Position: Point guard / shooting guard

Personal information
- Born: April 16, 1990 (age 36) Pordenone, Italy
- Listed height: 6 ft 2 in (1.88 m)
- Listed weight: 208 lb (94 kg)

Career information
- High school: Palmer (Colorado Springs, Colorado)
- College: Boston College (2008–2011)
- NBA draft: 2011: 1st round, 24th overall pick
- Drafted by: Oklahoma City Thunder
- Playing career: 2011–present

Career history
- 2011–2015: Oklahoma City Thunder
- 2015–2020: Detroit Pistons
- 2020–2023: Los Angeles Clippers
- 2023–2024: Denver Nuggets
- 2024–2025: Philadelphia 76ers

Career highlights
- NBA champion (2023); First-team All-ACC (2011); Mr. Colorado Basketball (2008)
- Stats at NBA.com
- Stats at Basketball Reference

Reginald Shon Jackson (born April 16, 1990), nicknamed Big Government and Mr. June, is an American professional basketball player who last played for the Philadelphia 76ers of the National Basketball Association (NBA). He played three seasons for the Boston College Eagles before declaring for the 2011 NBA draft, where he was drafted 24th overall by the Oklahoma City Thunder. Jackson has also played for the Detroit Pistons, Los Angeles Clippers, and Philadelphia 76ers. In 2023, Jackson won a championship with the Denver Nuggets.

== Early life ==
Jackson was born in Pordenone, in northeast Italy, to American parents. His father served at Aviano Air Base. The Jacksons later moved to England before going to the United States when Jackson was five. The family lived in North Dakota for a year before moving to Georgia and Florida before settling in Colorado Springs, Colorado when Jackson was in the sixth grade. He graduated from General William J. Palmer High School in Colorado Springs in 2008, and won the 2007–08 Gatorade Colorado Boys' Basketball Player of the Year. In April 2008, Jackson officially declared as an American citizen and relinquished his Italian citizenship.

Considered a three-star recruit by Rivals.com, Jackson was listed as the No. 29 shooting guard and the No. 115 player in the nation in 2008.

== College career ==
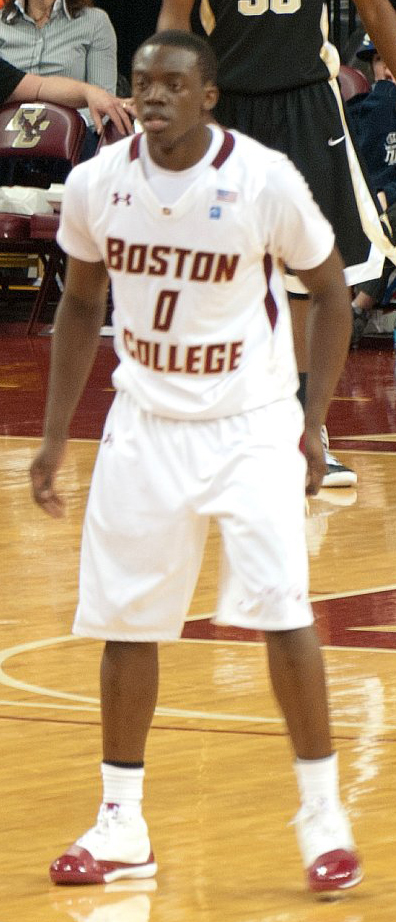
Jackson with Boston College

Jackson arrived at Boston College and joined a team that was already armed with stars such as Tyrese Rice and Rakim Sanders. In Jackson's freshman season, the Eagles made the NCAA tournament with Jackson being used as an explosive weapon off the bench.

In his second season, Jackson stepped into a starting role following the departure of Rice, but the Eagles were unable to make it back to the NCAA Tournament.

As a junior in 2010–11, Jackson led the Eagles in scoring with 18.2 points per game and led them to the National Invitation Tournament. He subsequently earned first-team All-ACC honors alongside Nolan Smith, Jordan Williams, Malcolm Delaney and Kyle Singler. After his junior season, Jackson declared for the NBA draft.

== Professional career ==
=== Oklahoma City Thunder (2011–2015) ===
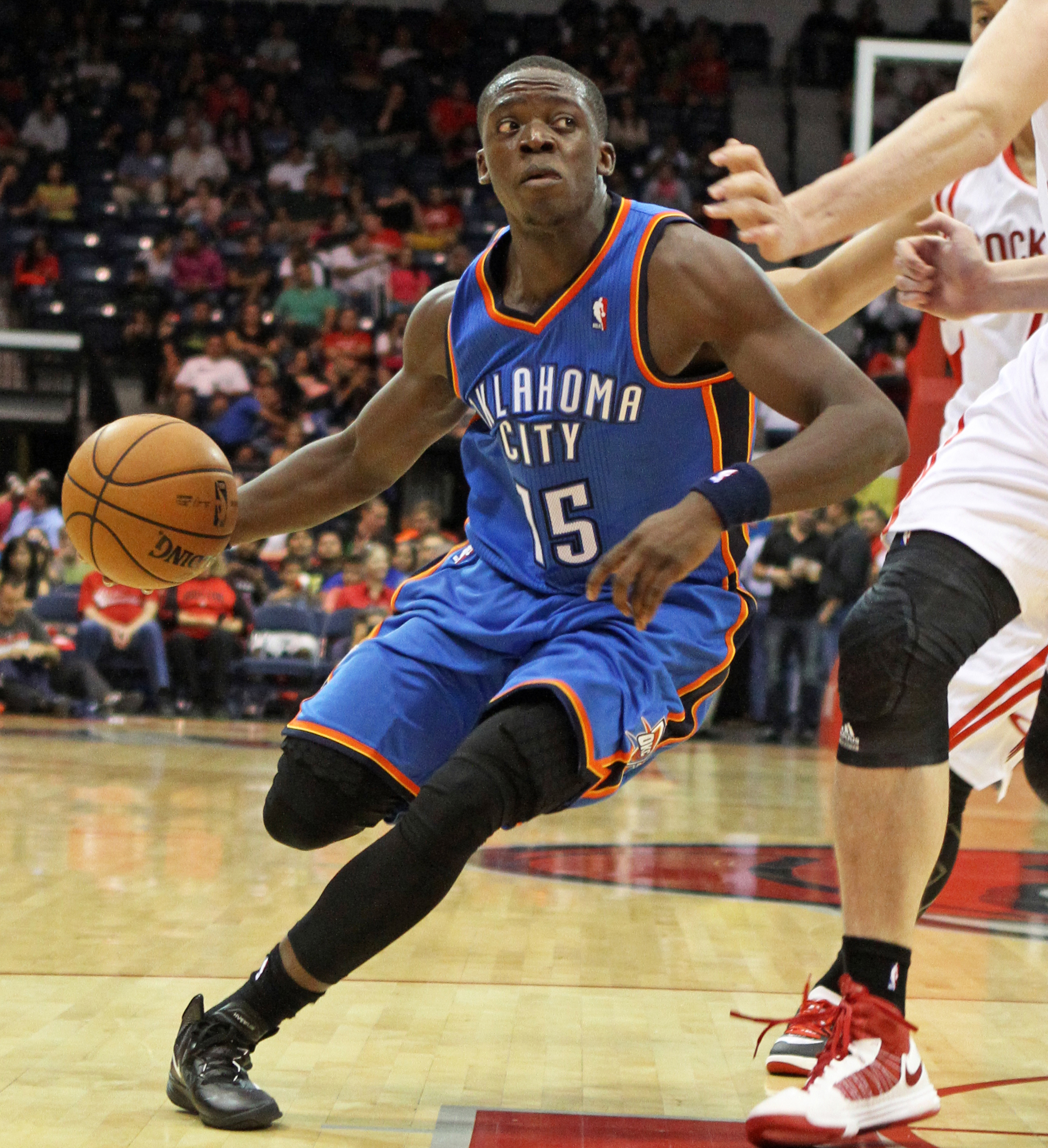
Jackson in 2012

Jackson was drafted with the 24th overall pick in the 2011 NBA draft by the Oklahoma City Thunder. Jackson saw limited action in his first season with the Thunder, averaging just 11.1 minutes over 45 games playing behind Russell Westbrook and Eric Maynor. Jackson scored over three points per game but shot only 32% from the field, and that percentage dropped to 21% when Jackson took shots beyond the arc. He did not play in any of the Thunder's 20 playoff games in 2012 as the Thunder lost to the Miami Heat in five games in the NBA Finals.

Jackson was assigned multiple times to the Tulsa 66ers of the NBA Development League between March and December 2012.

As a sophomore during the 2012–13 season, Jackson's minutes and production steadily increased. In Game 2 of the Thunder's first-round playoff series against the Houston Rockets, starting point guard Russell Westbrook tore his meniscus and was ruled out for the rest of the season, as Jackson was promoted to a starting role. In his first career start, Jackson had 14 points, two rebounds, and an assist, helping the Thunder win Game 3. As a starter during the playoffs, Jackson averaged 15.3 points, 5.3 rebounds and 4.7 assists per game.

On February 6, 2014, Jackson was chosen to compete in the 2014 Taco Bell Skills Challenge. On April 26, he recorded a career-high 32 points along with nine rebounds against the Memphis Grizzlies in game 4 of the 2014 first-round playoff series, which the Thunder won 92–89. Jackson had five points in the final minute of regulation to force overtime, but heaved a shot from full court, still with four seconds left. In overtime, Jackson hit four free throws to ensure a Thunder victory. He was praised for his performance as the Thunder's star players Kevin Durant and Russell Westbrook had off shooting nights.

On November 11, 2014, Jackson scored a season-high 29 points on 12-of-21 shooting in the 78–85 loss to the Milwaukee Bucks.

=== Detroit Pistons (2015–2020) ===
On February 19, 2015, Jackson was traded to the Detroit Pistons as part of a three-team deal that also involved the Utah Jazz. Three days later, he made his debut for the Pistons as he recorded 17 points, five rebounds, and five assists in a 106–89 victory over the Washington Wizards. On March 17, Jackson recorded 23 points and a career-high 20 assists in a 105–95 victory over the Memphis Grizzlies. Ten days later, Jackson recorded his second career triple-double, finishing with 26 points, 11 rebounds, and 10 assists in a 111–97 victory over the Orlando Magic. Jackson became the first Pistons guard to record multiple triple-doubles in a season since Isiah Thomas during the 1986–87 season, and the first Pistons player to do so since Grant Hill during the 1997–98 season.

On July 20, 2015, the Pistons re-signed Jackson to a five-year, $80 million contract. On November 8, he recorded a career-high 40 points in a 120–103 victory over the Portland Trail Blazers. He scored 26 of his 40 points in the fourth quarter, tying Will Bynum's franchise record for the most points in a quarter. On December 2, Jackson had a season-best game with 34 points and 16 assists in a 127–122 overtime victory over the Phoenix Suns. He was subsequently named the Eastern Conference Player of the Week for the week ending December 6. Jackson averaged 27.0 points and 8.8 assists, leading the Pistons to four consecutive wins during that time. Jackson became the first Piston to record 30-plus points and 15-plus assists in a game since Isiah Thomas recorded 40-plus points and 17 assists in 1988. Jackson was named the Eastern Conference Player of the Week for the week ending December 20. He joined Andre Drummond as the only Pistons teammates to win the award twice in the same season. Jackson averaged 29.3 points (first in the Eastern Conference), 7.7 assists (second in the Eastern Conference) and 6.3 rebounds while helping lead the Pistons to a 2–1 record for the week against three teams with above .500 records. He shot 46% from the field, 38% from behind the arc and 83% from the free-throw line. Jackson recorded two 30/10 games with 34 points and a season-high 11 rebounds against the Los Angeles Clippers on December 14 and 31 points and 13 assists in a quadruple-overtime victory over the Chicago Bulls on December 18. He scored 13 of the Pistons' 20 points in the deciding fourth overtime period. On April 8, 2016, he had 39 points and nine assists to help the Pistons defeat the Washington Wizards and clinch a spot in the postseason for the first time since 2009. The Pistons finished the regular season as the #8-seed in the Eastern Conference with a 44–38 record. However, in their first-round series against the first-seeded Cleveland Cavaliers, the Pistons were swept 4–0.

On October 10, 2016, Jackson received platelet-rich plasma (PRP) injections to treat left knee tendinosis and an ulnar collateral ligament (UCL) sprain of his right thumb. He was subsequently ruled out for six to eight weeks. After missing the first 21 games of the 2016–17 season, Jackson made his season debut for the Pistons on December 4, scoring 18 points in 23 minutes against the Orlando Magic. On March 6, 2017, he scored 24 of his 26 points in the second half of a 109–95 victory over the Chicago Bulls. He made all 10 of his field goal attempts after halftime.

On December 26, 2017, in a game against the Indiana Pacers, Jackson suffered a grade 3 right ankle sprain and was subsequently ruled out for six to eight weeks. He returned to action on March 20, 2018, after missing 24 games. Jackson scored seven points on 3-of-7 shooting in 15 minutes as a starter in a 115–88 victory over the Phoenix Suns.

On February 2, 2019, Jackson scored 29 points in a 111–101 loss to the Clippers. On February 22, he scored a season-high 32 points in a 125–122 victory over the Atlanta Hawks.

On February 18, 2020, Jackson was waived by the Pistons after a contract buyout agreement was reached.

=== Los Angeles Clippers (2020–2023) ===
On February 20, 2020, Jackson signed a one-year contract with the Los Angeles Clippers. On December 1, he re-signed with the Clippers.

On June 18, 2021, Jackson in the starting lineup with Paul George, Patrick Beverley and Terance Mann led the Clippers to their first Western Conference Finals appearance. In Game 6, Jackson scored 27 points, but the Clippers lost in six games to the Phoenix Suns. He averaged 17.8 points, 3.2 rebounds and 3.4 assists in the postseason.

On August 11, 2021, Jackson re-signed with the Clippers on a two-year contract. On November 23, he scored 31 points and grabbed 10 rebounds in a loss against the Dallas Mavericks. On December 11, Jackson scored 25 points, including a game-winning basket with 2.2 seconds left in a 106–104 victory over the Magic. On February 26, 2022, he scored 25 points and grabbed 8 rebounds, along with making a game-winning layup with 4.1 seconds remaining, in a narrow 111–110 victory over the Los Angeles Lakers.

On November 29, 2022, Jackson scored 24 points, recorded 12 assists, and grabbed seven rebounds during a 118–112 victory over the Portland Trail Blazers.

On February 9, 2023, Jackson and a future second-round pick were traded to the Charlotte Hornets in exchange for Mason Plumlee. Three days later, Jackson and the Hornets reached a contract buyout agreement.

=== Denver Nuggets (2023–2024) ===
On February 14, 2023, Jackson signed with the Denver Nuggets. Jackson won his first NBA championship when the Nuggets defeated the Miami Heat in five games during the 2023 NBA Finals.

On July 16, 2023, Jackson re-signed with the Nuggets. On November 27, he scored a season-high 35 points on 79% shooting, along with 13 assists, five rebounds, and two steals, leading a depleted Denver squad to a 113–104 road victory over his former team, the Los Angeles Clippers.

On July 6, 2024, Jackson was traded by the Nuggets to the Charlotte Hornets in a six-team sign and trade, which also included the Philadelphia 76ers, Golden State Warriors, Dallas Mavericks, and Minnesota Timberwolves, and the transaction became the NBA's first six-team transaction. On July 23, he was waived by the Hornets.

=== Philadelphia 76ers (2024–2025) ===
On July 30, 2024, Jackson signed with the Philadelphia 76ers.

On February 6, 2025, Jackson was traded to the Washington Wizards in exchange for Jared Butler. Following the trade, he was waived by Washington.

== Career statistics ==
Legend
GP	Games played	GS	Games started	MPG	Minutes per game
FG%	Field goal percentage	3P%	3-point field goal percentage	FT%	Free throw percentage
RPG	Rebounds per game	APG	Assists per game	SPG	Steals per game
BPG	Blocks per game	PPG	Points per game	**Bold**	Career high
†	Won an NBA championship	*	Led the league

=== NBA ===
==== Regular season ====
Year	Team	GP	GS	MPG	FG%	3P%	FT%	RPG	APG	SPG	BPG	PPG
2011–12	Oklahoma City	45	0	11.1	.321	.210	.862	1.2	1.6	.6	.0	3.1
2012–13	Oklahoma City	70	0	14.2	**.458**	.231	.839	2.4	1.7	.4	**.2**	5.3
2013–14	Oklahoma City	80	36	28.5	.440	.339	.893	3.9	4.1	**1.1**	.1	13.1
2014–15	Oklahoma City	50	13	28.0	.432	.278	.861	4.0	4.3	.8	.1	12.8
2014–15	Detroit	27	27	**32.2**	.436	.337	.796	**4.7**	**9.2**	.7	.1	17.6
2015–16	Detroit	79	79	30.7	.434	.353	.864	3.2	6.2	.7	.1	**18.8**
2016–17	Detroit	52	50	27.4	.419	.359	.868	2.2	5.2	.7	.1	14.5
2017–18	Detroit	45	45	26.7	.426	.308	.836	2.8	5.3	.6	.1	14.6
2018–19	Detroit	**82***	**82***	27.9	.421	.369	.864	2.6	4.2	.7	.1	15.4
2019–20	Detroit	14	10	27.2	.384	.378	.788	2.9	5.1	.6	.1	14.9
2019–20	L.A. Clippers	17	6	21.3	.453	.413	.905	3.0	3.2	.3	**.2**	9.5
2020–21	L.A. Clippers	67	43	23.0	.450	**.433**	.817	2.9	3.1	.6	.1	10.7
2021–22	L.A. Clippers	75	75	31.2	.392	.326	.847	3.6	4.8	.7	**.2**	16.8
2022–23^{†}	L.A. Clippers	52	38	25.7	.418	.350	**.924**	2.2	3.5	.7	.1	10.9
2022–23^{†}	Denver	16	2	19.9	.383	.279	.833	1.8	3.1	.6	.1	7.9
2023–24	Denver	**82**	23	22.2	.431	.359	.806	1.9	3.8	.5	**.2**	10.2
2024–25	Philadelphia	31	1	12.4	.391	.338	.778	1.4	1.5	.5	.1	4.4
Career		884	530	24.7	.423	.345	.854	2.8	4.1	.7	.1	12.3

==== Playoffs ====
Year	Team	GP	GS	MPG	FG%	3P%	FT%	RPG	APG	SPG	BPG	PPG
2013	Oklahoma City	11	9	33.4	.479	.302	.897	**4.9**	3.6	.5	**.5**	13.9
2014	Oklahoma City	**19**	4	27.9	.466	.396	.886	3.8	2.4	.3	.2	11.1
2016	Detroit	4	4	**36.8**	.455	.167	**1.000**	3.3	**9.3**	**1.5**	**.5**	14.3
2019	Detroit	4	4	26.9	.431	.429	.857	3.3	7.0	.8	.0	**17.8**
2020	L.A. Clippers	12	1	14.2	.438	**.531**	—	1.8	.9	.2	.1	4.9
2021	L.A. Clippers	**19**	**17**	32.7	.484	.408	.878	3.2	3.4	.9	.2	**17.8**
2023^{†}	Denver	6	0	3.0	**.500**	.500	—	.3	.3	.2	.0	.5
2024	Denver	12	0	9.8	.333	.348	**1.000**	1.3	1.0	.2	.1	3.5
Career		87	39	23.9	.460	.389	.890	2.9	2.8	.5	.2	10.7

=== College ===
Year	Team	GP	GS	MPG	FG%	3P%	FT%	RPG	APG	SPG	BPG	PPG
2008–09	Boston College	**34**	0	20.0	.440	.273	.685	3.3	1.7	.8	.4	7.0
2009–10	Boston College	31	20	30.1	.430	.291	.733	**5.7**	**4.5**	.6	**.5**	12.9
2010–11	Boston College	**34**	**32**	**34.1**	**.503**	**.420**	**.796**	4.3	**4.5**	**1.1**	**.5**	**18.2**
Career		99	52	28.0	.465	.351	.753	4.4	3.5	.8	.5	12.7

== Personal life ==
Jackson earned the nicknames "Big Government" from fans during his Clippers tenure due to his ability to "bail them out" with clutch performances in important games; and "Mr. June", in reference to the Hall of Fame Major League Baseball player, Reggie Jackson, who earned the nickname of 'Mr. October' due to how well he played in the MLB postseason.
