= Ivica Zubac =

Croatian basketball player (born 1997)

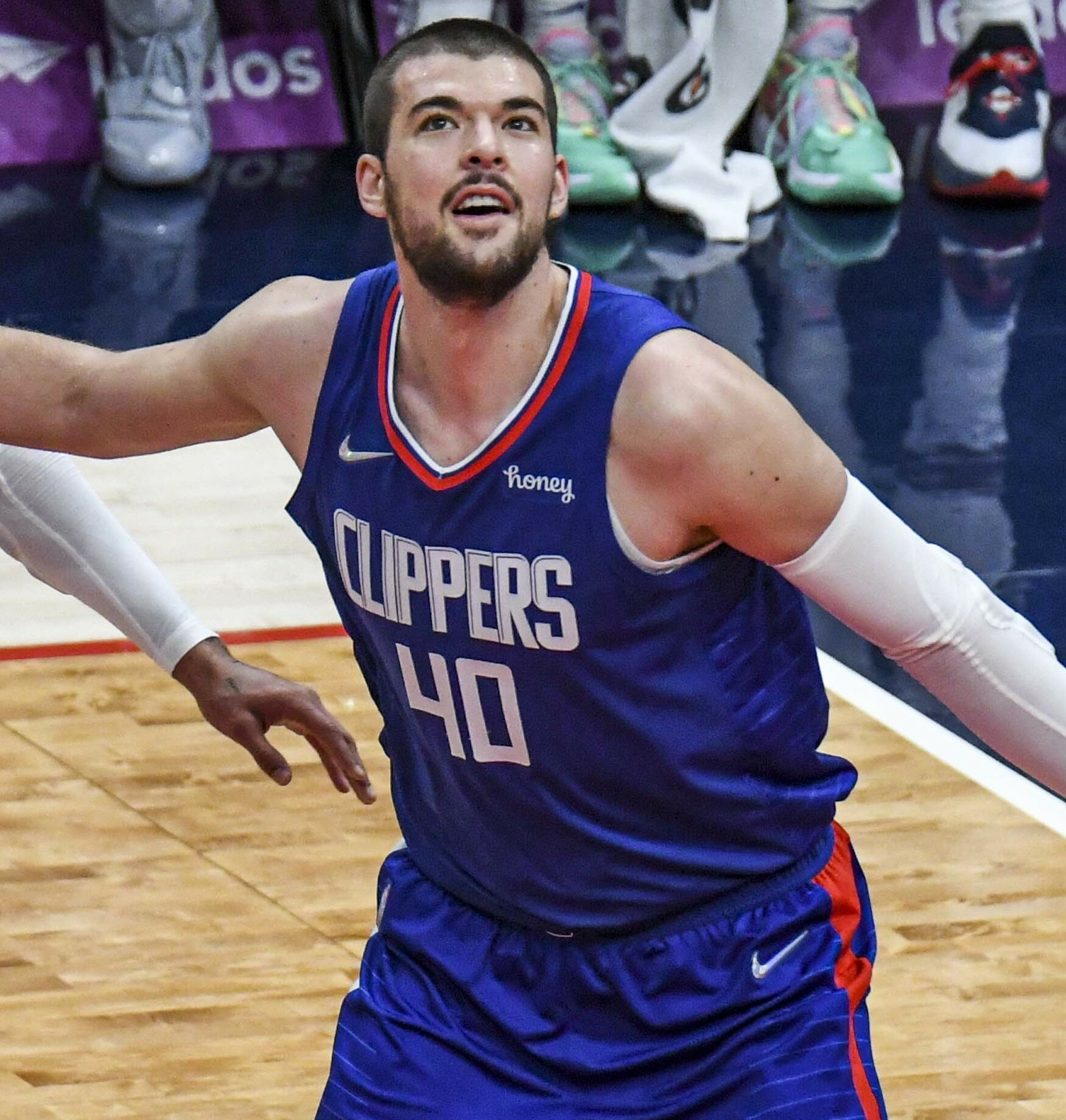
- Zubac with the Los Angeles Clippers in 2022

No. 40 – Indiana Pacers
- Position: Center
- League: NBA

Personal information
- Born: 18 March 1997 (age 29) Mostar, Bosnia and Herzegovina
- Listed height: 7 ft 0 in (2.13 m)
- Listed weight: 240 lb (109 kg)

Career information
- NBA draft: 2016: 2nd round, 32nd overall pick
- Drafted by: Los Angeles Lakers
- Playing career: 2013–present

Career history
- 2013–2014: Zrinjevac
- 2014–2016: Cibona
- 2015: →Gorica
- 2016: Mega Leks
- 2016–2019: Los Angeles Lakers
- 2016–2018: →Los Angeles D-Fenders / South Bay Lakers
- 2019–2026: Los Angeles Clippers
- 2026–present: Indiana Pacers

Career highlights
- NBA All-Defensive Second Team (2025)
- Stats at NBA.com
- Stats at Basketball Reference
Medals
Men's basketball
Representing Croatia
FIBA U19 World Championship
Silver medal – second place	2015 Greece

Ivica Zubac (/ɪvˈiːtsə ˈzuːbɑːts/ iv-EET-sə ZOO-bahts; Croatian: [îʋitsa zǔːbats]; born 18 March 1997) is a Croatian professional basketball player for the Indiana Pacers of the National Basketball Association (NBA) and the Croatian national basketball team. He was drafted by the Los Angeles Lakers in the second round in the 2016 NBA draft. He played for the Lakers until the 2019 trade deadline when he was traded to the Los Angeles Clippers. During the 2021 NBA Playoffs, he helped the Clippers reach the Western Conference Finals for the first time in franchise history. At the 2026 trade deadline, he was acquired by the Pacers.

== Early life ==
Zubac was born in Mostar, Bosnia and Herzegovina. He grew up in Čitluk, just east of the Croatian border. He holds dual citizenship but identifies fully as Croatian.

== Professional career ==
=== Europe (2013–2016) ===
Zubac came through the youth system of Cibona and then played for Zrinjevac in the second Croatian division during the 2013–14 season. He made the roster of Cibona's men's team the following season, becoming a part of a group of prospects including Nik Slavica and Ante Žižić after the departure of Dario Šarić. Zubac played in Croatia's top-tier level A-1 League and the ABA League his first year, and also saw action in the FIBA Europe Cup his second year. In February 2016, he left Cibona because of the financial difficulties of the team, and signed with Mega Leks of Serbia.

=== Los Angeles Lakers (2016–2019) ===
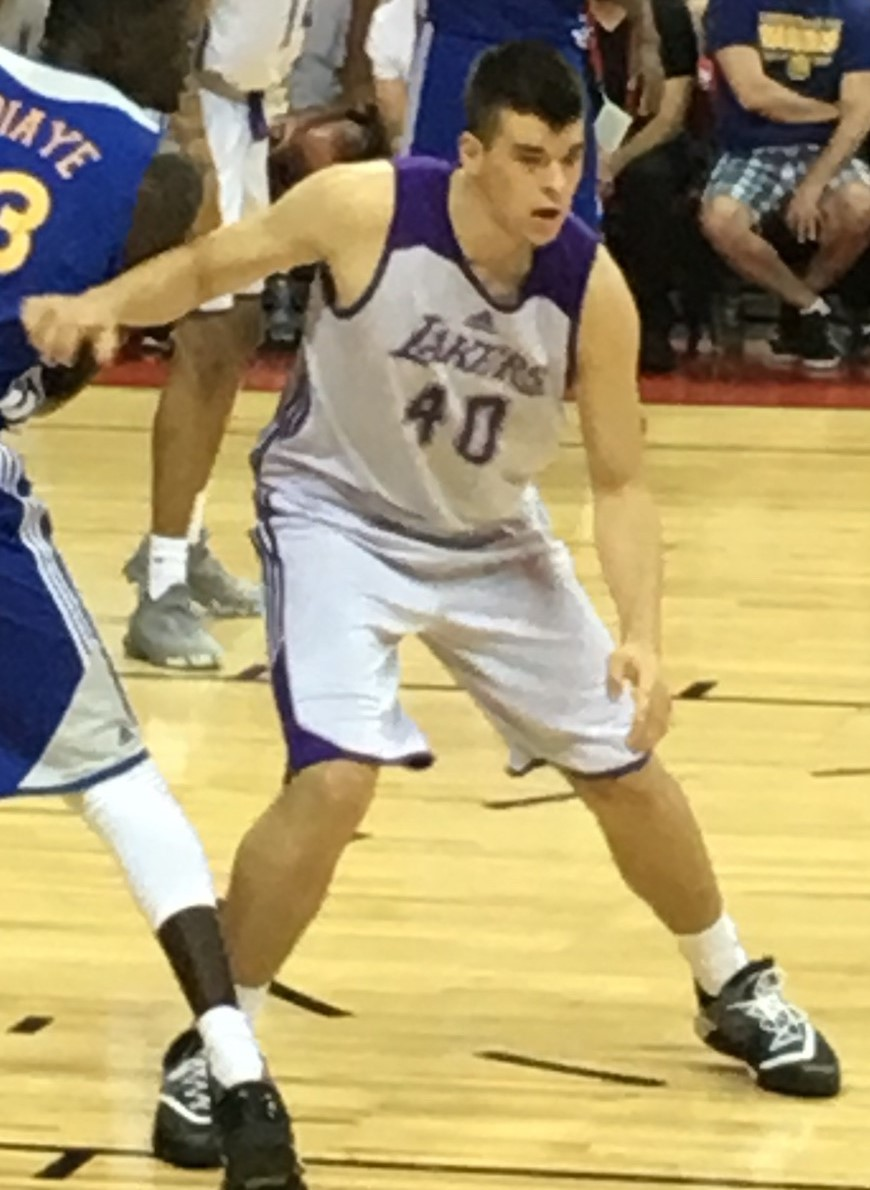
Zubac with the Los Angeles Lakers during NBA Summer League 2016

On 23 June 2016, Zubac was selected with the 32nd overall pick in the 2016 NBA draft by the Los Angeles Lakers. On 7 July, he signed with the Lakers and joined the team for the 2016 NBA Summer League. Zubac made his NBA debut on 2 November 2016, scoring six points as the fill-in starter for Timofey Mozgov, as the Lakers defeated the Atlanta Hawks 123–116. After appearing in only 10 NBA games over the first half of the season, Zubac had a season-best game on 17 January 2017 against the Denver Nuggets. He put together his first double-double, scoring 11 points and pulling down a team-high 13 rebounds. He also had three blocked shots in the 127–121 loss. On 12 March 2017, Zubac had 10 points, six rebounds and a season-high four blocked shots in a 118–116 loss to the Philadelphia 76ers. The following night, he had a season-best game with a career-best 25 points on 12-of-15 shooting to go with 11 rebounds in a 129–101 loss to the Denver Nuggets. On 31 March 2017, Zubac was ruled out for the rest of the season with a high ankle sprain in his right ankle. During his rookie season, Zubac had multiple assignments with the Los Angeles D-Fenders, the Lakers' D-League affiliate.

During the 2017–18 season, Zubac had multiple assignments with the South Bay Lakers, the Lakers' NBA G League affiliate due to limited playing time in the regular season.

=== Los Angeles Clippers (2019–2026) ===
On 7 February 2019, Zubac and Michael Beasley were traded to the Los Angeles Clippers in exchange for Mike Muscala. Zubac became a key member for the Clippers during the final stretch of the season, eventually reaching the playoffs for the first time in his career with them. Following the season, Zubac re-signed with the Clippers on a four-year, $28 million contract.

On 22 February 2020, Zubac posted a season-high 15 rebounds in 20 minutes of play against the Sacramento Kings. In a win over the Houston Rockets, Zubac shot a perfect 6 for 6 from the field and made a season-high 17 points, while also collecting 12 rebounds and blocking 1 shot on 5 March. On 6 August 2020, Zubac posted 21 points and 15 rebounds on 100% shooting in 24 minutes on the court in the 126–111 win against the Dallas Mavericks. This made Zubac the first player in the shot clock era to accomplish 20+ points and 15+ rebounds on 100% shooting in under 30 minutes of playing time.

On 15 February 2021, Zubac scored a season high 22 points, alongside grabbing 8 rebounds, in a 125–118 win over the Miami Heat. On 14 April, Zubac recorded a double-double with 18 points and 13 rebounds in a 100–98 win over the Detroit Pistons.

On 19 January 2022, Zubac scored a career-high 32 points and grabbed 10 rebounds during a 130–128 overtime loss against the Denver Nuggets. During the 2021-22 NBA season as a whole, Zubac started a career-high 76 games and averaged career-highs of 10.3 points and 8.5 rebounds per game.

On 28 June 2022, Zubac signed a three-year, $33 million contract extension with the Clippers. On 27 November, Zubac put up 31 points and a career-high 29 rebounds in a 114–110 win over the Indiana Pacers.

On 21 April 2024, Zubac scored a playoff career-high 20 points and 15 rebounds in a 109–97 victory against the Dallas Mavericks.

On 30 August 2024, Zubac agreed to a three–year, $58.6 million contract extension with the Clippers. He improved significantly this year, averaging career high in rebounds and points, leading to Lakers star LeBron James wishing he had him back, considering his remarkable improvement. On 9 April 2025, Zubac recorded his first career triple-double with 20 points, 11 rebounds, and 10 assists in a 134–117 win over the Houston Rockets. He started all 80 of his appearances for Los Angeles during the 2024–25 NBA season, averaging 16.8 points, 12.6 rebounds, and 2.7 assists. Zubac Finished as the Runner Up for NBA Most Improved Player during the Same Season losing to Dyson Daniels

Zubac made 43 appearances (including 42 starts) for the Clippers in the 2025–26 NBA season, recording averages of 14.4 points, 11.0 rebounds, and 2.2 assists.

=== Indiana Pacers (2026–present) ===
On 5 February 2026, Zubac and Kobe Brown were traded to the Indiana Pacers in exchange for Bennedict Mathurin, Isaiah Jackson, two first-round picks, and a second-round pick. One of the picks would turn out to be the 5th pick in the 2026 NBA Draft, where the Clippers used the pick to draft Keaton Wagler. Following his trade, head coach Rick Carlisle stated that Zubac would have a delayed debut due to an ankle injury and a paternity leave. He started five games for Indiana, logging averages of 11.6 points, 7.2 rebounds, and 1.8 assists. On 26 March, Zubac was ruled out for the season after suffering a fractured rib during a game against the Portland Trail Blazers. The Zubac trade ended up costing the Pacers the 5th overall pick in the 2026 NBA draft lottery.

On October 25, 2026, Zubac played just 7 minutes against the Brooklyn Nets before stepping on Kelly Oubre Jr. foot while chasing a rebound and sprained his left ankle. He left the floor with two points, two assists, and one rebound. He exited the arena on crutches.

== National team career ==
Zubac represented the Croatian junior national team during the 2013 FIBA Europe Under-16 Championship. He averaged 17.6 points and 7.9 rebounds a contest during the 2015 FIBA Under-19 World Championship in Greece, while receiving All-World Championship Under-19 Second Team honors from the European basketball website eurobasket.com. Zubac averaged double digits in scoring (15.8 points per game) and rebounding (12.9 rebounds per game), to go along with 3.0 blocks per game at the 2015 FIBA Europe Under-18 Championship, while making the all-tournament second team (as selected by eurobasket.com).

== NBA career statistics ==
Legend
GP	Games played	GS	Games started	MPG	Minutes per game
FG%	Field goal percentage	3P%	3-point field goal percentage	FT%	Free throw percentage
RPG	Rebounds per game	APG	Assists per game	SPG	Steals per game
BPG	Blocks per game	PPG	Points per game	**Bold**	Career high
*	Led the league

=== Regular season ===
Year	Team	GP	GS	MPG	FG%	3P%	FT%	RPG	APG	SPG	BPG	PPG
2016–17	L.A. Lakers	38	11	16.0	.529	.000	.653	4.2	.8	.4	.9	7.5
2017–18	L.A. Lakers	43	0	9.5	.500	.000	.765	2.8	.6	.2	.3	3.7
2018–19	L.A. Lakers	33	12	15.6	.580	—	**.864**	4.9	.8	.1	.8	8.5
2018–19	L.A. Clippers	26	25	20.1	.538	—	.733	7.7	1.5	.4	.9	9.4
2019–20	L.A. Clippers	72	70	18.4	.613	.000	.747	7.5	1.1	.2	.9	8.3
2020–21	L.A. Clippers	72*	33	22.3	**.652**	**.250**	.789	7.2	1.3	.3	.9	9.0
2021–22	L.A. Clippers	76	76	24.4	.626	—	.727	8.5	1.6	.5	1.0	10.3
2022–23	L.A. Clippers	76	76	28.5	.634	.000	.697	9.9	1.0	.4	**1.3**	10.8
2023–24	L.A. Clippers	68	68	26.4	.649	—	.723	9.2	1.4	.3	1.2	11.7
2024–25	L.A. Clippers	**80**	**80**	**32.8**	.628	—	.661	**12.6**	**2.7**	**.7**	1.1	**16.8**
2025–26	L.A. Clippers	43	42	30.9	.613	—	.705	11.0	2.2	.4	.8	14.4
2025–26	Indiana	5	5	23.6	.472	—	.800	7.2	1.8	.4	.8	11.6
Career		632	498	23.5	.614	.083	.725	8.3	1.4	.4	1.0	10.5

=== Playoffs ===
Year	Team	GP	GS	MPG	FG%	3P%	FT%	RPG	APG	SPG	BPG	PPG
2019	L.A. Clippers	4	3	9.7	.500	—	.667	5.5	.3	.5	.5	5.0
2020	L.A. Clippers	13	**13**	24.6	.564	—	**.811**	7.2	.6	.2	.8	9.1
2021	L.A. Clippers	**17**	7	17.7	.596	—	.796	5.8	.4	.1	.7	6.3
2023	L.A. Clippers	5	5	26.0	.567	—	.750	9.6	.6	.6	.2	9.2
2024	L.A. Clippers	6	6	32.0	.600	—	.650	9.3	1.0	**.8**	.5	16.2
2025	L.A. Clippers	7	7	**36.6**	**.659**	—	.528	**10.1**	**2.3**	.7	**1.0**	**17.4**
Career		52	41	23.8	.597	—	.728	7.5	.8	.4	.7	9.8

== Personal life ==
Former NBA player and fellow Mostar-born Zoran Planinić is his cousin. Additionally, on February 5, 2026, the same day Zubac got traded to Indiana, his wife Kristina Prišč gave birth to their new daughter, Sienna Leina Zubac.

== See also ==
- List of European basketball players in the United States
- List of NBA career field goal percentage leaders
