= Jay Scrubb =

American basketball player (born 2000)

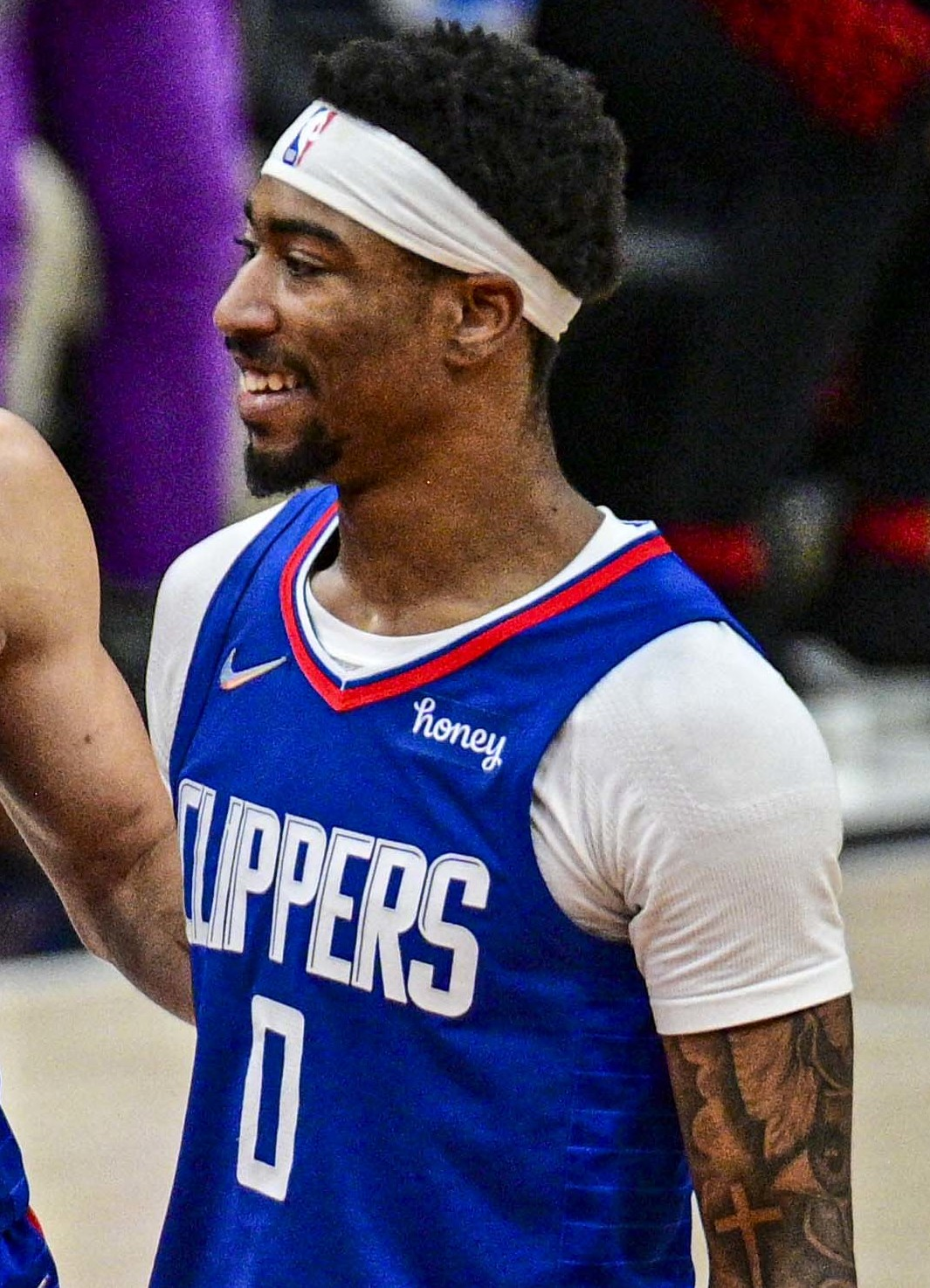
- Scrubb with the Los Angeles Clippers in 2022

No. 0 – Selenge Bodons
- Position: Shooting guard / small forward
- League: Mongolian Basketball League

Personal information
- Born: September 1, 2000 (age 26) Louisville, Kentucky, U.S.
- Listed height: 6 ft 4 in (1.93 m)
- Listed weight: 220 lb (100 kg)

Career information
- High school: Trinity (Louisville, Kentucky)
- College: John A. Logan (2018–2020)
- NBA draft: 2020: 2nd round, 55th overall pick
- Drafted by: Brooklyn Nets
- Playing career: 2020–present

Career history
- 2020–2022: Los Angeles Clippers
- 2021–2022: →Agua Caliente Clippers
- 2022–2023: Lakeland Magic
- 2023: Orlando Magic
- 2023: →Lakeland Magic
- 2024–2025: Maine Celtics
- 2025: Glint Manisa Basket
- 2025–2026: Long Island Nets
- 2026–present: Selenge Bodons

Career highlights
- NABC Junior College Player of the Year (2020)
- Stats at NBA.com
- Stats at Basketball Reference

Jayden Amari Scrubb (born September 1, 2000) is an American professional basketball player for the Selenge Bodons of the Mongolian Basketball League. He played college basketball for the John A. Logan Volunteers and was named NABC NJCAA Division I Player of the Year as a sophomore. Scrubb was selected with the 55th overall pick in the 2020 NBA draft by the Brooklyn Nets.

== Early life ==
Scrubb grew up on the west end of Louisville, Kentucky. He grew up rooting for his hometown team, the Louisville Cardinals. His father described his hometown as "a tougher part of town, which some would consider the hood".

== High school career ==
As a freshman, Scrubb attended Central High School in Louisville but was not allowed on the basketball team due to poor academic performance. He sometimes took medications because he believed he had a learning disability. In the summer after failing his freshman year, Scrubb studied to meet the minimum requirements to start his sophomore year. As a sophomore, he transferred from Central to the more esteemed Trinity High School, a prep school in Louisville, on a need-based voucher.

In his first basketball season at Trinity, Scrubb occasionally practiced with the varsity team but never played in games, as he had to sit out due to transfer rules. In his junior year, he enrolled in an alternative academic program at Trinity through which he joined smaller classes and made progress in school. Over the summer, he also claimed to grow from 6 ft 2 in (1.88 m) to 6 ft 6 in (1.98 m). In his junior season, Scrubb averaged 16 points per game and was named Seventh Region Player of the Year by The Courier-Journal. As a senior, he averaged 17.8 points and 7.1 rebounds per game. Scrubb repeated as Seventh Region Player of the Year and was a finalist for the Kentucky Mr. Basketball award.

== College career ==
On April 11, 2018, Scrubb signed to play college basketball for John A. Logan College, a junior college in Carterville, Illinois. He joined a junior college team because he was academically ineligible for an NCAA Division I scholarship, although he had intentions of later transferring to a Division I program. Scrubb made his college debut on November 1, 2018, scoring 12 points in a 106–81 win over Motlow State. On December 8, he scored 25 points and a season-high 20 rebounds in a 99–69 victory over Southeastern Illinois College. Scrubb, on January 16, posted a season-best 40 points and 13 rebounds in a 105–93 win over Rend Lake College. He finished the season averaging 20.2 points, 8.9 rebounds, and 1.6 blocks per game, shooting 46 percent from three-point range. Scrubb was named National Junior College Athletic Association (NJCAA) Region 24 Player of the Year and Great Rivers Athletic Conference (GRAC) Freshman of the Year. He also earned first-team NJCAA Division I All-American honors.

Scrubb parlayed his freshman success at John A. Logan into offers from many NCAA Division I programs, including Louisville, Memphis, and Texas Tech. He was ranked as the number one junior college recruit in his class after his first season. On September 28, 2019, Scrubb committed to play for Louisville following an additional year at John A. Logan. On November 1, 2019, in his sophomore season opener, Scrubb scored 13 points and battled foul trouble in an upset loss to Otero Junior College. On December 6, it was announced that he had been suspended indefinitely after returning to campus late after Thanksgiving break. As a sophomore, Scrubb averaged 21.9 points, 6.8 rebounds and 2.7 assists a game. After the season, he was named the NABC NJCAA Division I Player of the Year and repeated as a first-team NJCAA Division I All-American, while being named GRAC Player of the Year. On March 25, 2020, Scrubb declared for the 2020 NBA draft while maintaining his eligibility and did not immediately sign with an agent. On April 9, he announced that he would sign with an agent and forgo his remaining college basketball eligibility.

== Professional career ==
=== Los Angeles / Agua Caliente Clippers (2020–2022) ===
On November 18, 2020, Scrubb was drafted by the Brooklyn Nets with the 55th overall pick in the 2020 NBA draft. He was subsequently traded to the Los Angeles Clippers. He became the first JUCO player to be drafted since Donta Smith in 2004. On November 23, Scrubb signed a two-way contract with the Clippers.

On February 9, 2022, the Clippers announced that Scrubb would undergo season-ending surgery to repair the plantar plate in his right foot. He was waived by the Clippers on July 7.

=== Orlando / Lakeland Magic (2022–2023) ===
On October 18, 2022, Scrubb signed with the Lakeland Magic and on March 24, 2023, he signed a two-way contract with the Orlando Magic. However, he was waived on June 5.

=== Maine Celtics (2024–2025) ===
After scoring 14.4 points per game with Boston's Summer League team, Scrubb signed a two-way contract with the Boston Celtics on July 15, 2023. However, he suffered a torn right ACL during practice on October 8 and was then later waived on October 22.

On October 8, 2024, Scrubb re-signed with the Boston Celtics, but was waived on October 17. On October 26, he joined the Maine Celtics.

=== Manisa Basket (2025) ===
On August 16, 2025, he signed with Manisa Basket of the Basketbol Süper Ligi (BSL).

=== Long Island Nets (2025–present) ===
On October 25, 2025, Scrubb's returning player rights were traded to the Long Island Nets from the Maine Celtics in exchange for the returning player rights to Oshae Brissett. He later signed with the Nets on October 30.

== Career statistics ==
Legend
GP	Games played	GS	Games started	MPG	Minutes per game
FG%	Field goal percentage	3P%	3-point field goal percentage	FT%	Free throw percentage
RPG	Rebounds per game	APG	Assists per game	SPG	Steals per game
BPG	Blocks per game	PPG	Points per game	**Bold**	Career high

=== NBA ===
==== Regular season ====
Year	Team	GP	GS	MPG	FG%	3P%	FT%	RPG	APG	SPG	BPG	PPG
2020–21	L.A. Clippers	4	**1**	**21.0**	.389	.222	**1.000**	**3.5**	.3	**1.0**	.0	**8.8**
2021–22	L.A. Clippers	**18**	0	6.7	.391	.286	.700	.9	.4	.2	**.2**	2.7
2022–23	Orlando	2	0	15.0	**.714**	**1.000**	.500	3.0	**.5**	**1.0**	.0	6.5
Career		24	1	9.8	.416	.313	.765	1.5	.4	.4	.1	4.0

==== Playoffs ====
Year	Team	GP	GS	MPG	FG%	3P%	FT%	RPG	APG	SPG	BPG	PPG
2021	L.A. Clippers	6	0	1.3	—	—	—	.2	.0	.0	.0	.0
Career		6	0	1.3	—	—	—	.2	.0	.0	.0	.0

=== College ===
Year	Team	GP	GS	MPG	FG%	3P%	FT%	RPG	APG	SPG	BPG	PPG
2018–19	John A. Logan	**30**	**30**	—	**.549**	**.464**	**.791**	**8.9**	1.5	1.1	**1.6**	20.2
2019–20	John A. Logan	29	25	—	.501	.333	.727	6.8	**2.7**	**1.4**	.9	**21.9**
Career		59	55	—	.524	.395	.753	7.9	2.1	1.3	1.3	21.0
