= 2020–21 Los Angeles Clippers season =

NBA Sports team season

- Head coach: Tyronn Lue
- General manager: Michael Winger
- Owner: Steve Ballmer
- Arena: Staples Center

Results
- Record: 47–25 (.653)
- Place: Division: 2nd (Pacific); Conference: 4th (Western)
- Playoff finish: Conference finals (lost to Suns 2–4)
- Stats at Basketball Reference

Local media
- Television: KCOP-TV; Bally Sports West (Note: Formerly Fox Sports West until March 31, 2021.)
- Radio: KLAC

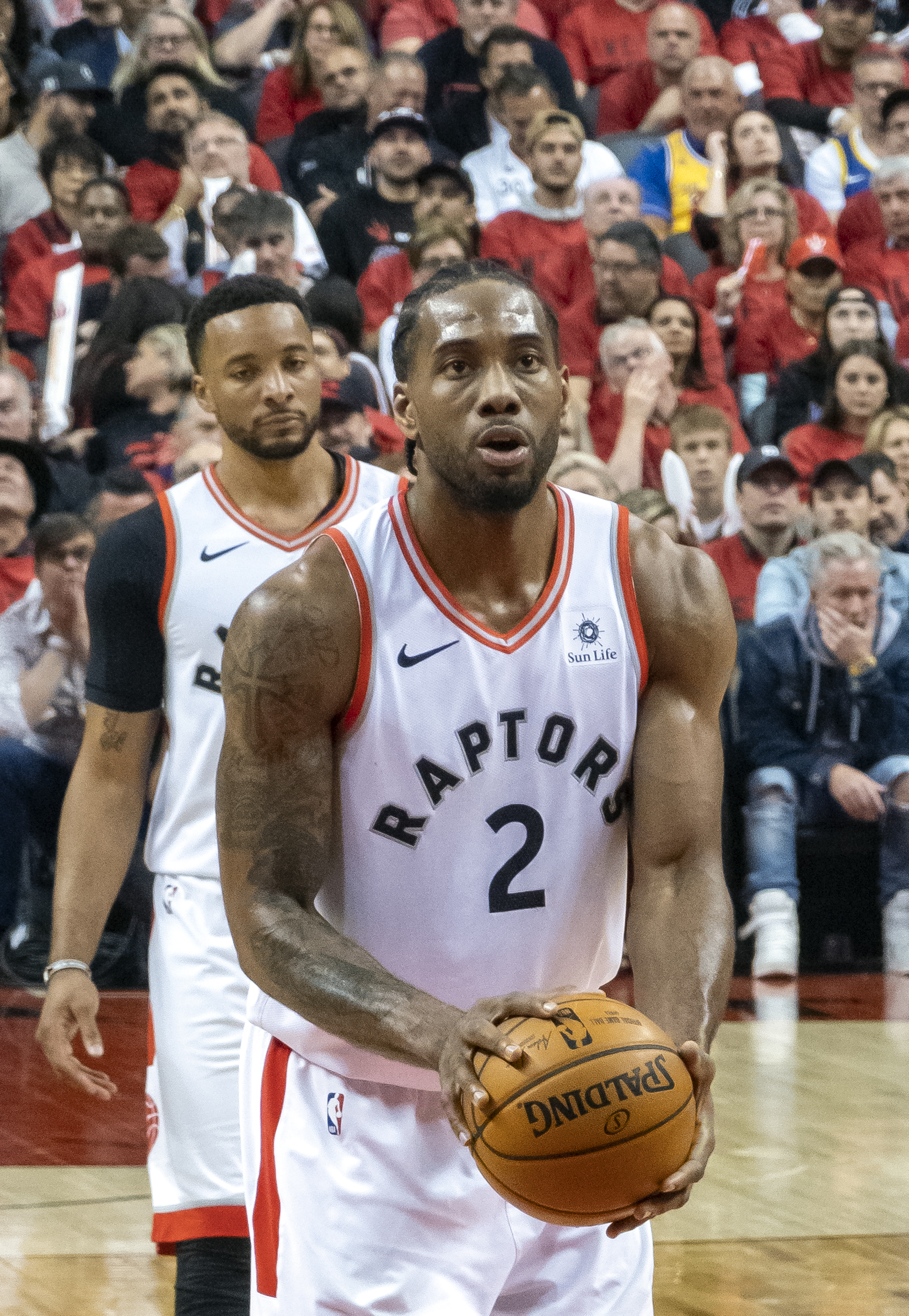
Kawhi Leonard played his second season with the Clippers. He made his fifth All-Star appearance and was named to his third All-NBA First Team, but missed the Western Conference finals with a partially torn ACL. (Pictured in 2019 with the Toronto Raptors)

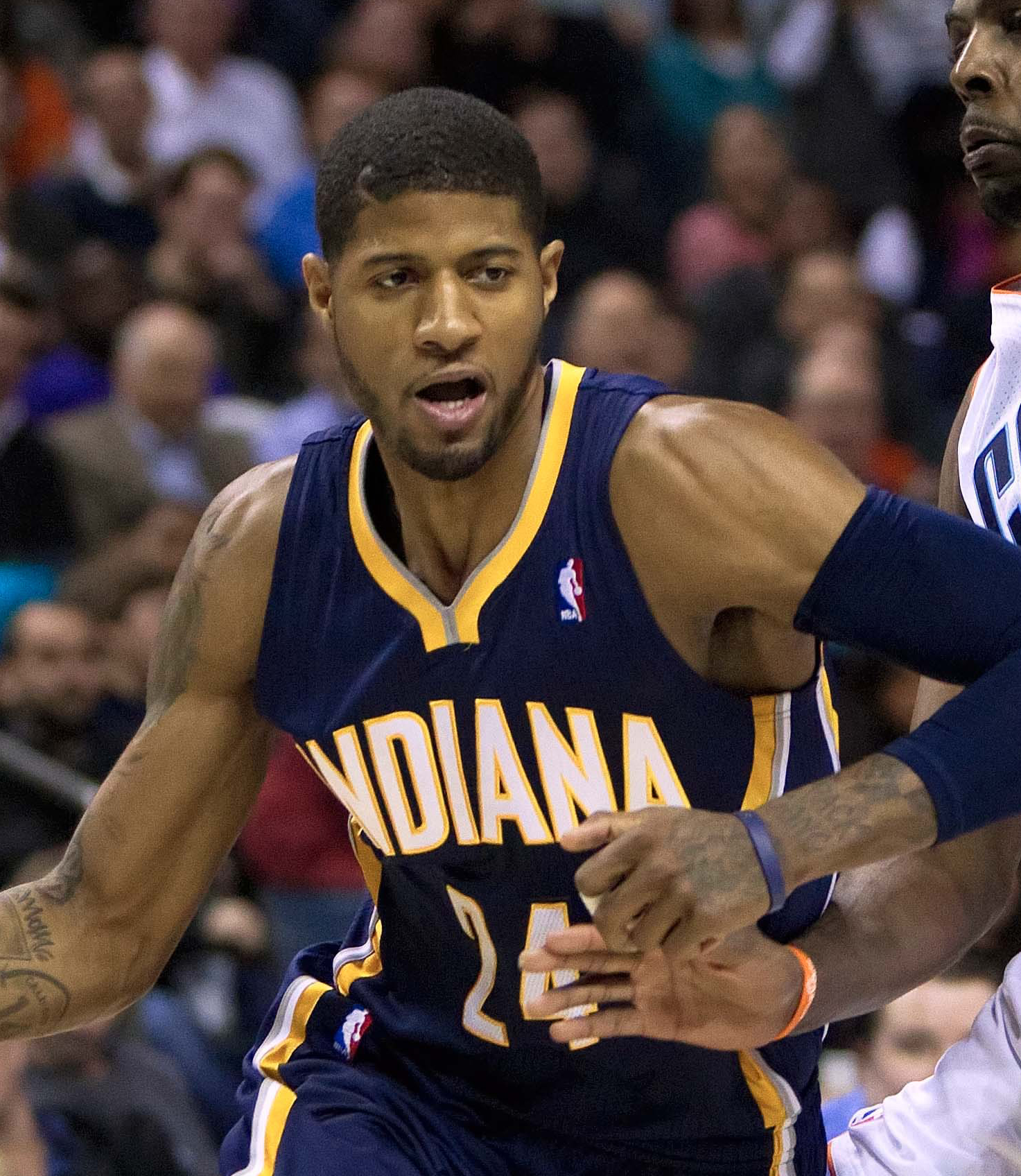
Paul George played his second season with the Clippers. He was named to his seventh All-Star team as a reserve. (Pictured in 2014 with the Indiana Pacers)

The 2020–21 Los Angeles Clippers season was the 51st season of the franchise in the National Basketball Association (NBA), their 43rd season in Southern California, and their 37th season in Los Angeles.

On September 28, 2020, the Clippers and head coach Doc Rivers mutually agreed to part ways after seven seasons with the team. On October 20, 2020, the Clippers promoted Tyronn Lue as their new head coach.

The Clippers made the deepest playoff run in their 51-year history. They advanced to the conference finals for the first time in franchise history after defeating the Utah Jazz in six games in the conference semifinals. Their run would come to an end against the Phoenix Suns (who were led by former Clippers star Chris Paul) in the conference finals, losing in six games.

The Clippers were the first team to come back from down 2–0 more than once in the same season, denying the Dallas Mavericks and the Utah Jazz a chance at a 3–0 series lead, a deficit which no team in NBA history has ever come back from in a playoff series.

== Draft ==
Round	Pick	Player	Position	Nationality	College
2	57	Reggie Perry	PF	United States	Mississippi State

== Roster ==
2020–21 Los Angeles Clippers roster
Players

Pos.	No.	Player	Height	Weight	DOB	From
G/F	33	Nicolas Batum	6 ft 8 in (2.03 m)	230 lb (104 kg)	1988-12-14	France
G	21	Patrick Beverley	6 ft 1 in (1.85 m)	180 lb (82 kg)	1988-07-12	Arkansas
G/F	7	Amir Coffey (TW)	6 ft 8 in (2.03 m)	210 lb (95 kg)	1997-06-17	Minnesota
C	15	DeMarcus Cousins	6 ft 11 in (2.11 m)	270 lb (122 kg)	1990-08-13	Kentucky
G	11	Yogi Ferrell	6 ft 0 in (1.83 m)	178 lb (81 kg)	1993-05-09	Indiana
G/F	13	Paul George	6 ft 8 in (2.03 m)	220 lb (100 kg)	1990-05-02	Fresno State
F/C	9	Serge Ibaka	7 ft 0 in (2.13 m)	235 lb (107 kg)	1989-09-18	Republic of the Congo
G	1	Reggie Jackson	6 ft 2 in (1.88 m)	208 lb (94 kg)	1990-04-16	Boston College
G	5	Luke Kennard	6 ft 5 in (1.96 m)	206 lb (93 kg)	1996-06-24	Duke
F	2	Kawhi Leonard	6 ft 7 in (2.01 m)	225 lb (102 kg)	1991-06-29	San Diego State
G/F	14	Terance Mann	6 ft 5 in (1.96 m)	215 lb (98 kg)	1996-10-18	Florida State
F	8	Marcus Morris	6 ft 10 in (2.08 m)	218 lb (99 kg)	1989-09-02	Kansas
C	10	Daniel Oturu	6 ft 10 in (2.08 m)	240 lb (109 kg)	1999-09-20	Minnesota
F	54	Patrick Patterson	6 ft 9 in (2.06 m)	235 lb (107 kg)	1989-03-14	Kentucky
G	4	Rajon Rondo	6 ft 1 in (1.85 m)	180 lb (82 kg)	1986-02-22	Kentucky
G	0	Jay Scrubb (TW)	6 ft 5 in (1.96 m)	220 lb (100 kg)	2000-09-01	John A. Logan
C	40	Ivica Zubac	7 ft 1 in (2.16 m)	240 lb (109 kg)	1997-03-18	Croatia

Coaches
Head coach
- Tyronn Lue
Assistant(s)
- Kenny Atkinson
- Chauncey Billups
- Jeremy Castleberry
- Dan Craig (associate HC)
- Larry Drew
- Brendan O'Connor
- Roy Rogers

Legend
- (DP) Unsigned draft pick
- (FA) Free agent
- (S) Suspended
- (GL) On assignment to G League affiliate
- (TW) Two-way affiliate player
- Injured

Roster
Updated: June 27, 2021

=== Roster notes ===
- Guard Rajon Rondo is the 30th former Lakers player to play for the Clippers.
- Center DeMarcus Cousins signed with the Lakers last season but got injured before the start of season and never actually got to play wearing the Lakers uniform.
- Assistant coach Larry Drew played for the franchise from 1986 to 1988.

== Standings ==
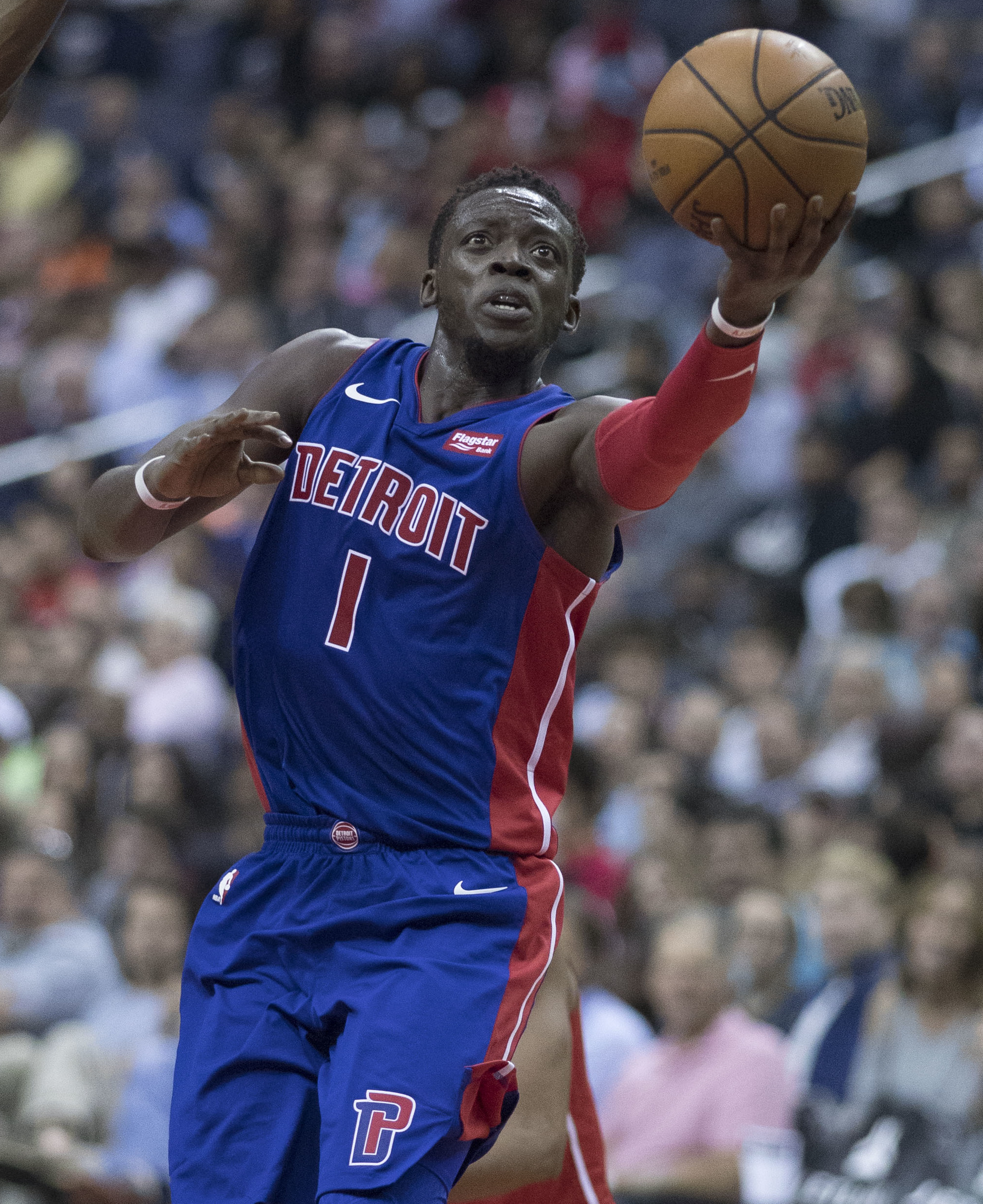
Reggie Jackson played his second season with the Clippers and had a breakout postseason, starting 17 of 19 games. (Pictured in 2017 with the Detroit Pistons)

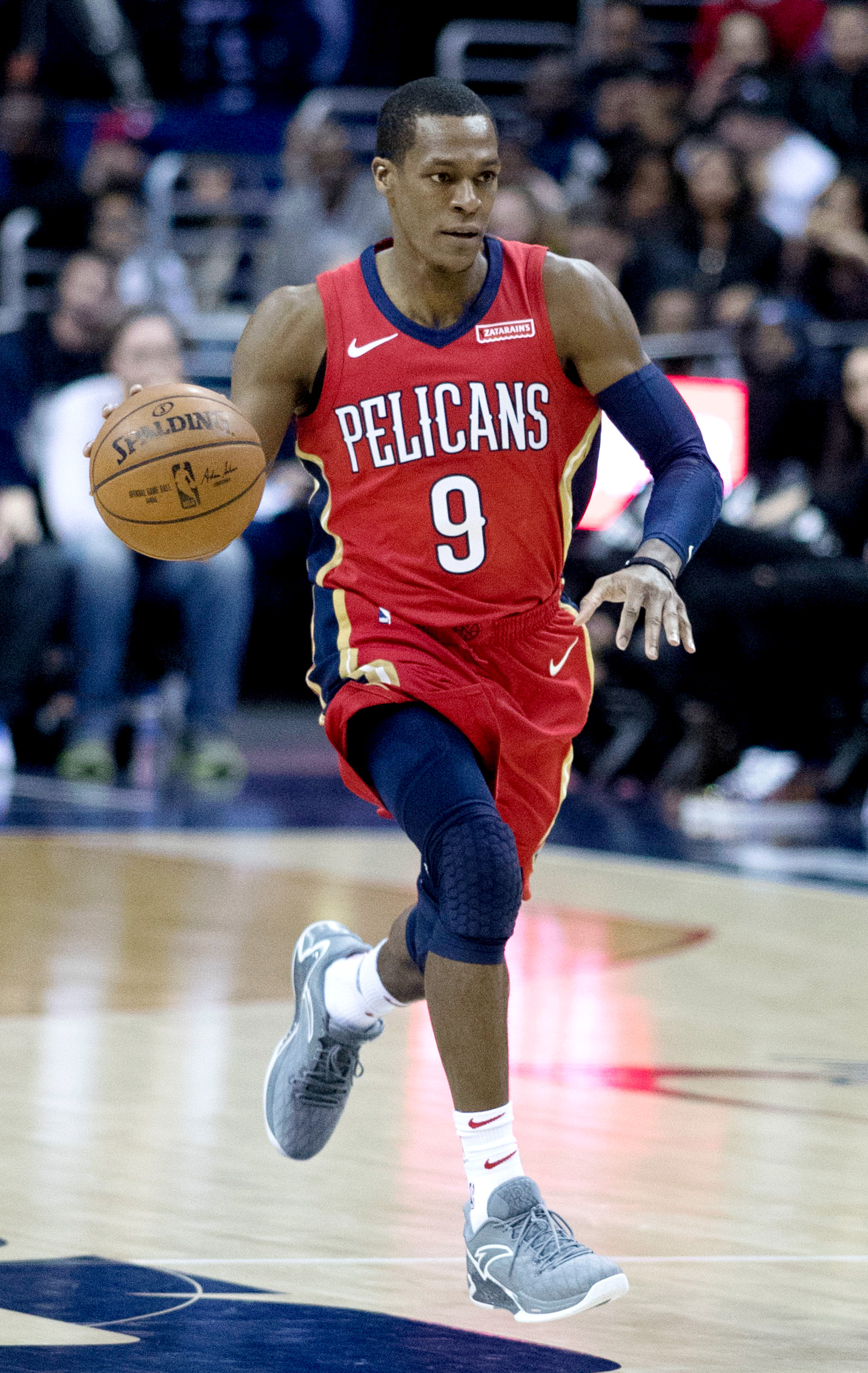
Rajon Rondo played his first season with the Clippers after being acquired from the Atlanta Hawks for Lou Williams and two future round draft picks. (Pictured in 2017 with the New Orleans Pelicans)

=== Division ===
Pacific Division	W	L	PCT	GB	Home	Road	Div	GP
y – Phoenix Suns	51	21	.708	–	27‍–‍9	24‍–‍12	7–5	72
x – Los Angeles Clippers	47	25	.653	4.0	26‍–‍10	21‍–‍15	9–3	72
x – Los Angeles Lakers	42	30	.583	9.0	21‍–‍15	21‍–‍15	4–8	72
pi – Golden State Warriors	39	33	.542	12.0	25‍–‍11	14‍–‍22	5–7	72
Sacramento Kings	31	41	.431	20.0	16‍–‍20	15‍–‍21	5–7	72

=== Conference ===
Western Conference
#	Team	W	L	PCT	GB	GP
1	z – Utah Jazz *	52	20	.722	–	72
2	y – Phoenix Suns *	51	21	.708	1.0	72
3	x – Denver Nuggets	47	25	.653	5.0	72
4	x – Los Angeles Clippers	47	25	.653	5.0	72
5	y – Dallas Mavericks *	42	30	.583	10.0	72
6	x – Portland Trail Blazers	42	30	.583	10.0	72
7	x – Los Angeles Lakers	42	30	.583	10.0	72
8	pi – Golden State Warriors	39	33	.542	13.0	72
9	x – Memphis Grizzlies	38	34	.528	14.0	72
10	pi – San Antonio Spurs	33	39	.458	19.0	72
11	New Orleans Pelicans	31	41	.431	21.0	72
12	Sacramento Kings	31	41	.431	21.0	72
13	Minnesota Timberwolves	23	49	.319	29.0	72
14	Oklahoma City Thunder	22	50	.306	30.0	72
15	Houston Rockets	17	55	.236	35.0	72

Notes

- z – Clinched home court advantage for the entire playoffs
- c – Clinched home court advantage for the conference playoffs
- y – Clinched division title
- x – Clinched playoff spot
- pb – Clinched play-in spot
- o – Eliminated from playoff contention
- * – Division leader

== Game log ==
=== Preseason ===
2020 preseason game log
Total: 0–3 (home: 0–1; road: 0–2)
Preseason: 0–3 (home: 0–1; road: 0–2)

Game	Date	Team	Score	High points	High rebounds	High assists	Location Attendance	Record
1	December 11	@ L.A. Lakers	L 81–87	Paul George (10)	Ivica Zubac (10)	4 tied (2)	Staples Center	0–1
2	December 13	@ L.A. Lakers	L 106–131	Lou Williams (12)	Ivica Zubac (6)	Terance Mann (5)	Staples Center	0–2
3	December 17	Utah	L 105–125	Paul George (16)	Nicolas Batum (8)	Paul George (5)	Staples Center	0–3

2020–21 season schedule

=== Regular season ===
2020–21 game log
Total: 47–25 (home: 26–10; road: 21–15)
December: 4–1 (home: 2–1; road: 2–0)

Game	Date	Team	Score	High points	High rebounds	High assists	Location Attendance	Record
1	December 22	@ L. A. Lakers	W 116–109	Paul George (33)	4 tied (6)	Nicolas Batum (6)	Staples Center; 0	1–0
2	December 25	@ Denver	W 121–108	Paul George (23)	Nicolas Batum (10)	Paul George (9)	Ball Arena; 0	2–0
3	December 27	Dallas	L 73–124	Paul George (15)	Serge Ibaka (9)	Paul George (4)	Staples Center; 0	2–1
4	December 29	Minnesota	W 124–101	Lou Williams (20)	Serge Ibaka (8)	George, Williams (5)	Staples Center; 0	3–1
5	December 30	Portland	W 128–105	Kawhi Leonard (28)	Paul George (10)	George, Leonard (7)	Staples Center; 0	4–1

January: 12–4 (home: 6–1; road: 6–3)

Game	Date	Team	Score	High points	High rebounds	High assists	Location Attendance	Record
6	January 1	@ Utah	L 100–106	Paul George (25)	Kawhi Leonard (16)	Kawhi Leonard (9)	Vivint Smart Home Arena; Limited Seating	4–2
7	January 3	@ Phoenix	W 112–107	Paul George (39)	Patrick Beverley (9)	Reggie Jackson (6)	Phoenix Suns Arena; 0	5–2
8	January 5	San Antonio	L 113–116	Kawhi Leonard (30)	Nicolas Batum (9)	Kawhi Leonard (10)	Staples Center; 0	5–3
9	January 6	@ Golden State	W 108–101	George, Leonard (21)	Serge Ibaka (14)	Kawhi Leonard (4)	Chase Center; 0	6–3
10	January 8	@ Golden State	L 105–115	Paul George (25)	Serge Ibaka (7)	Paul George (7)	Chase Center; 0	6–4
11	January 10	Chicago	W 130–127	Kawhi Leonard (35)	3 tied (7)	Paul George (9)	Staples Center; 0	7–4
12	January 13	New Orleans	W 111–106	Kawhi Leonard (28)	Ivica Zubac (7)	Kawhi Leonard (9)	Staples Center; 0	8–4
13	January 15	@ Sacramento	W 138–100	Kawhi Leonard (27)	Ivica Zubac (7)	Kennard, Leonard (7)	Golden 1 Center; 0	9–4
14	January 17	Indiana	W 129–96	3 tied (20)	3 tied (7)	Patrick Beverley (6)	Staples Center; 0	10–4
15	January 20	Sacramento	W 115–96	Kawhi Leonard (32)	Ivica Zubac (12)	Paul George (12)	Staples Center; 0	11–4
16	January 22	Oklahoma City	W 120–116	Kawhi Leonard (31)	Serge Ibaka (11)	Lou Williams (8)	Staples Center; 0	12–4
17	January 24	Oklahoma City	W 108–100	Kawhi Leonard (34)	Ivica Zubac (11)	Kawhi Leonard (8)	Staples Center; 0	13–4
18	January 26	@ Atlanta	L 99–108	Reggie Jackson (20)	Ivica Zubac (10)	Reggie Jackson (8)	State Farm Arena; 0	13–5
19	January 28	@ Miami	W 109–105	Nicolas Batum (18)	Serge Ibaka (13)	Reggie Jackson (6)	American Airlines Arena; 0	14–5
20	January 29	@ Orlando	W 116–90	Paul George (26)	George, Ibaka (9)	Paul George (5)	Amway Center; 3,763	15–5
21	January 31	@ New York	W 129–115	Kawhi Leonard (28)	Paul George (8)	George, Williams (5)	Madison Square Garden; 0	16–5

February: 8–7 (home: 4–4; road: 4–3)

Game	Date	Team	Score	High points	High rebounds	High assists	Location Attendance	Record
22	February 2	@ Brooklyn	L 120–124	Kawhi Leonard (33)	Serge Ibaka (10)	Paul George (6)	Barclays Center; 0	16–6
23	February 3	@ Cleveland	W 121–99	Paul George (36)	Ivica Zubac (16)	Paul George (6)	Rocket Mortgage FieldHouse; 0	17–6
24	February 5	Boston	L 115–119	Kawhi Leonard (28)	Kawhi Leonard (11)	Lou Williams (6)	Staples Center; 0	17–7
25	February 7	Sacramento	L 110–113	Lou Williams (23)	Ivica Zubac (14)	Lou Williams (5)	Staples Center; 0	17–8
26	February 10	@ Minnesota	W 119–112	Kawhi Leonard (36)	Nicolas Batum (10)	Kawhi Leonard (5)	Target Center; 0	18–8
27	February 12	@ Chicago	W 125–106	Kawhi Leonard (33)	Batum, Leonard (6)	Lou Williams (5)	United Center; 0	19–8
28	February 14	Cleveland	W 128–111	Lou Williams (30)	Serge Ibaka (9)	Lou Williams (10)	Staples Center; 0	20–8
29	February 15	Miami	W 125–118	Marcus Morris Sr. (32)	Serge Ibaka (9)	Lou Williams (10)	Staples Center; 0	21–8
30	February 17	Utah	L 96–114	Lou Williams (16)	Ivica Zubac (9)	Lou Williams (6)	Staples Center; 0	21–9
31	February 19	Utah	W 116–112	Kawhi Leonard (29)	Serge Ibaka (9)	Paul George (5)	Staples Center; 0	22–9
32	February 21	Brooklyn	L 108–112	Paul George (34)	Kawhi Leonard (13)	Paul George (7)	Staples Center; 0	22–10
33	February 23	Washington	W 135–116	Kawhi Leonard (32)	Ivica Zubac (13)	Batum, Leonard, Morris Sr. (4)	Staples Center; 0	23–10
34	February 25	@ Memphis	L 94–122	Kawhi Leonard (17)	George, Ibaka (7)	Kawhi Leonard (7)	FedEx Forum; 1,896	23–11
35	February 26	@ Memphis	W 119–99	Kawhi Leonard (30)	Kawhi Leonard (9)	Paul George (8)	FedEx Forum; 2,039	24–11
36	February 28	@ Milwaukee	L 100–105	Kawhi Leonard (25)	Serge Ibaka (11)	Paul George (7)	Fiserv Forum; 1,800	24–12

March: 8–5 (home: 5–1; road: 3–4)

Game	Date	Team	Score	High points	High rebounds	High assists	Location Attendance	Record
37	March 2	@ Boston	L 112–117	Paul George (32)	Ivica Zubac (10)	Reggie Jackson (7)	TD Garden; 0	24–13
38	March 4	@ Washington	L 117–119	Kawhi Leonard (22)	Ivica Zubac (13)	Nicolas Batum (5)	Capital One Arena; 0	24–14
39	March 11	Golden State	W 130–104	Kawhi Leonard (28)	Serge Ibaka (14)	Paul George (5)	Staples Center; 0	25–14
40	March 14	@ New Orleans	L 115–135	Kawhi Leonard (23)	Terance Mann (7)	Luke Kennard (4)	Smoothie King Center; 3,700	25–15
41	March 15	@ Dallas	W 109–99	Kawhi Leonard (22)	Ivica Zubac (11)	Kawhi Leonard (7)	American Airlines Center; 3,945	26–15
42	March 17	@ Dallas	L 89–105	Paul George (28)	George, Leonard, Morris Sr., Zubac (7)	Kawhi Leonard (7)	American Airlines Center; 3,975	26–16
43	March 20	Charlotte	W 125–98	Paul George (21)	Batum, George, Jackson, Zubac (5)	Paul George (10)	Staples Center; 0	27–16
44	March 22	Atlanta	W 119–110	Kawhi Leonard (25)	Terance Mann (10)	Paul George (7)	Staples Center; 0	28–16
45	March 24	@ San Antonio	W 134–101	Kawhi Leonard (25)	Ivica Zubac (8)	Batum, George, Jackson (4)	AT&T Center; 3,224	29–16
46	March 25	@ San Antonio	W 98–85	Reggie Jackson (28)	George, Zubac (13)	George, Jackson (4)	AT&T Center; 3,225	30–16
47	March 27	Philadelphia	W 122–112	Kawhi Leonard (28)	Ivica Zubac (11)	Paul George (9)	Staples Center; 0	31–16
48	March 29	Milwaukee	W 129–105	Marcus Morris Sr. (25)	Leonard, Zubac (9)	Kawhi Leonard (8)	Staples Center; 0	32–16
49	March 30	Orlando	L 96–103	Kawhi Leonard (28)	Ivica Zubac (13)	Reggie Jackson (7)	Staples Center; 0	32–17

April: 11–4 (home: 7–1; road: 4–3)

Game	Date	Team	Score	High points	High rebounds	High assists	Location Attendance	Record
50	April 1	Denver	L 94–101	Kawhi Leonard (24)	Kawhi Leonard (12)	Paul George (5)	Staples Center; 0	32–18
51	April 4	L. A. Lakers	W 104–86	Marcus Morris (22)	Kawhi Leonard (10)	Kawhi Leonard (8)	Staples Center; 0	33–18
52	April 6	Portland	W 133–116	Paul George (36)	Kawhi Leonard (11)	Kawhi Leonard (12)	Staples Center; 0	34–18
53	April 8	Phoenix	W 113–103	Paul George (33)	Paul George (7)	Rajon Rondo (9)	Staples Center; 0	35–18
54	April 9	Houston	W 126–109	Kawhi Leonard (31)	Ivica Zubac (7)	Terance Mann (9)	Staples Center; 0	36–18
55	April 11	Detroit	W 131–124	Marcus Morris (33)	Ivica Zubac (10)	Paul George (9)	Staples Center; 0	37–18
56	April 13	@ Indiana	W 126–115	Paul George (36)	Paul George (8)	George, Jackson, Mann, Rondo (2)	Bankers Life Fieldhouse; 0	38–18
57	April 14	@ Detroit	W 100–98	Reggie Jackson (29)	Ivica Zubac (13)	Rajon Rondo (4)	Little Caesars Arena; 750	39–18
58	April 16	@ Philadelphia	L 103–106	Paul George (37)	Paul George (9)	Rajon Rondo (8)	Wells Fargo Center; 4,094	39–19
59	April 18	Minnesota	W 124–105	Paul George (23)	Kawhi Leonard (11)	Kawhi Leonard (18)	Staples Center; 1,734	40–19
60	April 20	@ Portland	W 113–112	Paul George (33)	Paul George (11)	Rajon Rondo (7)	Moda Center; 0	41–19
61	April 21	Memphis	W 117–105	Luke Kennard (28)	DeMarcus Cousins (10)	Ferrell, Mann (7)	Staples Center; 1,782	42–19
62	April 23	@ Houston	W 109–104	Paul George (33)	Paul George (14)	Batum, Jackson (5)	Toyota Center; 3,313	43–19
63	April 26	@ New Orleans	L 103–120	Terance Mann (17)	DeMarcus Cousins (11)	Jackson, Rondo (5)	Smoothie King Center; 3,700	43–20
64	April 28	@ Phoenix	L 101–109	Paul George (25)	Paul George (10)	Paul George (10)	Phoenix Suns Arena; 5,917	43–21

May: 4–4 (home: 2–2; road: 2–2)

Game	Date	Team	Score	High points	High rebounds	High assists	Location Attendance	Record
65	May 1	Denver	L 104–110	Paul George (20)	Paul George (7)	Paul George (7)	Staples Center; 2,818	43–22
66	May 4	Toronto	W 105–100	George, Morris Sr. (22)	Paul George (9)	Jackson, Leonard, Rondo (5)	Staples Center; 1,714	44–22
67	May 6	L. A. Lakers	W 118–94	Paul George (24)	Leonard, Zubac (8)	Kawhi Leonard (6)	Staples Center; 3,275	45–22
68	May 9	New York	L 100–106	Kawhi Leonard (29)	George, Rondo, Zubac (8)	Rajon Rondo (8)	Staples Center; 2,578	45–23
69	May 11	@ Toronto	W 115–96	Leonard, Mann (20)	Ivica Zubac (10)	Batum, George, Rondo (4)	Amalie Arena; Limited seating	46–23
70	May 13	@ Charlotte	W 113–90	Paul George (22)	Ivica Zubac (11)	Kawhi Leonard (9)	Spectrum Center; 4,442	47–23
71	May 14	@ Houston	L 115–122	Luke Kennard (23)	Serge Ibaka (7)	Rajon Rondo (13)	Toyota Center; 3,803	47–24
72	May 16	@ Oklahoma City	L 112–117	Terance Mann (19)	Daniel Oturu (12)	Beverley, Patterson (4)	Chesapeake Energy Arena; 0	47–25

2020–21 season schedule

=== Playoffs ===
2021 playoff game log
Total: 10–9 (home: 5–5; road: 5–4)
First Round: 4–3 (home: 1–3; road: 3–0)

Game	Date	Team	Score	High points	High rebounds	High assists	Location Attendance	Series
1	May 22	Dallas	L 103–113	Kawhi Leonard (26)	Kawhi Leonard (10)	George, Leonard (5)	Staples Center; 6,117	0–1
2	May 25	Dallas	L 121–127	Kawhi Leonard (41)	Paul George (12)	Rajon Rondo (7)	Staples Center; 6,885	0–2
3	May 28	@ Dallas	W 118–108	Kawhi Leonard (36)	Kawhi Leonard (8)	George, Jackson (4)	American Airlines Center; 17,705	1–2
4	May 30	@ Dallas	W 106–81	Kawhi Leonard (29)	Kawhi Leonard (10)	Rajon Rondo (4)	American Airlines Center; 17,761	2–2
5	June 2	Dallas	L 100–105	Paul George (23)	Ivica Zubac (11)	George, Rondo (6)	Staples Center; 7,428	2–3
6	June 4	@ Dallas	W 104–97	Kawhi Leonard (45)	Paul George (13)	Paul George (6)	American Airlines Center; 18,324	3–3
7	June 6	Dallas	W 126–111	Kawhi Leonard (28)	Kawhi Leonard (10)	Paul George (10)	Staples Center; 7,342	4–3

Conference semifinals: 4–2 (home: 3–0; road: 1–2)

Game	Date	Team	Score	High points	High rebounds	High assists	Location Attendance	Series
1	June 8	@ Utah	L 109–112	Kawhi Leonard (23)	Paul George (11)	Rajon Rondo (5)	Vivint Arena; 18,007	0–1
2	June 10	@ Utah	L 111–117	Reggie Jackson (29)	George, Morris Sr. (10)	Paul George (6)	Vivint Arena; 18,007	0–2
3	June 12	Utah	W 132–106	Kawhi Leonard (34)	Kawhi Leonard (12)	George, Leonard (5)	Staples Center; 8,185	1–2
4	June 14	Utah	W 118–104	George, Leonard (31)	Paul George (9)	Batum, George (4)	Staples Center; 8,474	2–2
5	June 16	@ Utah	W 119–111	Paul George (37)	Paul George (16)	Paul George (5)	Vivint Arena; 18,007	3–2
6	June 18	Utah	W 131–119	Terance Mann (39)	Paul George (9)	Reggie Jackson (10)	Staples Center; 17,105	4–2

Conference finals: 2–4 (home: 1–2; road: 1–2)

Game	Date	Team	Score	High points	High rebounds	High assists	Location Attendance	Series
1	June 20	@ Phoenix	L 114–120	Paul George (34)	Nicolas Batum (10)	Rajon Rondo (7)	Phoenix Suns Arena; 16,583	0–1
2	June 22	@ Phoenix	L 103–104	Paul George (26)	Ivica Zubac (11)	Paul George (6)	Phoenix Suns Arena; 16,645	0–2
3	June 24	Phoenix	W 106–92	Paul George (27)	Ivica Zubac (16)	Paul George (8)	Staples Center; 17,222	1–2
4	June 26	Phoenix	L 80–84	Paul George (23)	Paul George (16)	Paul George (6)	Staples Center; 18,222	1–3
5	June 28	@ Phoenix	W 116–102	Paul George (41)	Paul George (13)	Paul George (6)	Phoenix Suns Arena; 16,664	2–3
6	June 30	Phoenix	L 103–130	Marcus Morris Sr. (26)	George, Morris Sr. (9)	Reggie Jackson (8)	Staples Center; 18,495	2–4

2021 playoff schedule

== Player statistics ==
Legend
GP	Games played	GS	Games started	MPG	Minutes per game
FG%	Field-goal percentage	3P%	3-point field-goal percentage	FT%	Free-throw percentage
RPG	Rebounds per game	APG	Assists per game	SPG	Steals per game
BPG	Blocks per game	PPG	Points per game

=== Regular season ===
Player	GP	GS	MPG	FG%	3P%	FT%	RPG	APG	SPG	BPG	PPG
Ivica Zubac	72	33	22.3	.652	.250	.789	7.2	1.3	.3	.9	9.0
Reggie Jackson	67	43	23.0	.450	.433	.817	2.9	3.1	.6	.1	10.7
Nicolas Batum	67	38	27.4	.464	.404	.828	4.7	2.2	1.0	.6	8.1
Terance Mann	67	10	18.9	.509	.418	.830	3.6	1.6	.4	.2	7.0
Luke Kennard	63	17	19.6	.476	.446	.839	2.6	1.7	.4	.1	8.3
Marcus Morris Sr.	57	29	26.4	.473	.473	.820	4.1	1.0	.6	.3	13.4
Paul George	54	54	33.7	.467	.411	.868	6.6	5.2	1.1	.4	23.3
Kawhi Leonard	52	52	34.1	.512	.398	.885	6.5	5.2	1.6	.4	24.8
Amir Coffey	44	1	9.0	.437	.411	.711	1.0	.5	.2	.0	3.2
Lou Williams^{†}	42	3	21.9	.421	.378	.866	2.1	3.4	.9	.1	12.1
Serge Ibaka	41	39	23.3	.510	.339	.811	6.7	1.8	.2	1.1	11.1
Patrick Patterson	38	5	15.3	.436	.357	.765	2.0	.8	.4	.2	5.2
Patrick Beverley	37	34	22.5	.423	.397	.800	3.2	2.1	.8	.8	7.5
Daniel Oturu	30	0	5.4	.423	.200	.750	1.6	.3	.1	.2	1.8
Mfiondu Kabengele^{†}	23	0	4.1	.281	.222	.833	.6	.2	.1	.1	1.2
Rajon Rondo^{†}	18	1	20.4	.486	.432	1.000	3.1	5.8	1.0	.1	7.6
DeMarcus Cousins^{†}	16	0	12.9	.537	.421	.682	4.5	1.0	.8	.4	7.8
Yogi Ferrell^{†}	8	0	12.0	.333	.316	1.000	1.5	2.1	.5	.3	4.6
Jay Scrubb	4	1	21.0	.389	.222	1.000	3.5	.3	1.0	.0	8.8
Malik Fitts	3	0	3.7	.333	.500		1.0	.0	.0	.0	1.0

=== Playoffs ===
Player	GP	GS	MPG	FG%	3P%	FT%	RPG	APG	SPG	BPG	PPG
Paul George	19	19	40.8	.441	.336	.844	9.6	5.4	1.0	.5	26.9
Marcus Morris Sr.	19	18	31.8	.430	.375	.750	4.3	1.5	.5	.5	12.2
Reggie Jackson	19	17	32.7	.484	.408	.878	3.2	3.4	.9	.2	17.8
Nicolas Batum	19	10	29.2	.486	.389	.826	5.5	2.1	1.3	.5	8.1
Terance Mann	19	6	19.9	.519	.432	.714	2.7	.7	.5	.3	7.6
Patrick Beverley	17	7	19.0	.426	.351	.857	2.4	1.4	.7	.7	4.9
Ivica Zubac	17	7	17.7	.596		.796	5.8	.4	.1	.7	6.3
Luke Kennard	15	0	14.6	.477	.412	.500	.9	.5	.1	.0	5.6
Rajon Rondo	13	0	16.9	.340	.393	.667	2.6	3.8	.4	.2	4.2
Kawhi Leonard	11	11	39.3	.573	.393	.880	7.7	4.4	2.1	.8	30.4
Amir Coffey	10	0	1.6	.750	1.000	.000	.2	.1	.1	.0	.7
Yogi Ferrell	9	0	1.7	.400	.000		.3	.3	.0	.0	.4
Daniel Oturu	8	0	1.9	.400	.000	.500	.5	.0	.0	.1	.6
DeMarcus Cousins	7	0	8.3	.452	.400	.786	2.0	.7	.3	.4	7.6
Jay Scrubb	6	0	1.3				.2	.0	.0	.0	.0
Serge Ibaka	2	0	9.0	.500	.000	1.000	2.0	1.0	.5	1.5	5.0

- ^{†} Denotes player spent time with another team in the season. Stats reflect time with the Clippers only.

== Transactions ==
=== Trades ===
November 19, 2020	To Los Angeles Clippers Luke Kennard (from Detroit); Justin Patton (from Detroit); Draft rights to Jay Scrubb (#55) (from Brooklyn); 2023 POR second-round pick (from Detroit); 2024 DET second-round pick (from Detroit); 2025 DET second-round pick (from Detroit); 2026 DET second-round pick (from Detroit)	To Detroit Pistons Džanan Musa (from Brooklyn); Rodney McGruder (from LA Clippers); Draft rights to Saddiq Bey (#19) (from Brooklyn); Draft rights to Jaylen Hands (2019 #57) (from Brooklyn); 2021 TOR second-round pick (from Brooklyn); Cash considerations (from LA Clippers)
November 19, 2020	To Brooklyn Nets Landry Shamet (from LA Clippers); Bruce Brown (from Detroit)
November 19, 2020	To Los Angeles Clippers Draft rights to Daniel Oturu (#33)	To Oklahoma City Thunder Draft rights to Mathias Lessort (2017 #50); 2023 DET second-round pick
March 19, 2021	To Los Angeles Clippers 2022 SAC second-round draft pick	To Sacramento Kings Mfiondu Kabengele; 2022 ATL second-round draft pick Cash considerations
March 25, 2021	To Los Angeles Clippers Rajon Rondo	To Atlanta Hawks Lou Williams; 2023 POR second-round draft pick 2027 LAC second-round draft pick Cash considerations

=== Free agency ===
==== Re-signed ====
Player	Signed
Marcus Morris	November 25, 2020
Patrick Patterson	November 25, 2020
Reggie Jackson	December 1, 2020

==== Additions ====
Player	Signed	Former team
Serge Ibaka	November 25, 2020	Toronto Raptors
Nicolas Batum	December 1, 2020	Charlotte Hornets
DeMarcus Cousins	April 5, 2021 (10-day contract); April 15, 2021 (2nd 10-day contract); April 25, 2021 (signed for the rest of the season)	Houston Rockets
Malik Fitts	April 9, 2021 (10-day contract)	Agua Caliente Clippers
Yogi Ferrell	April 19, 2021 (10-day contract); April 29, 2021 (signed for the rest of the season)	Salt Lake City Stars

==== Subtractions ====
Player	Reason left	New team
JaMychal Green	Free agency	Denver Nuggets
Montrezl Harrell	Free agency	Los Angeles Lakers
Justin Patton	Waived	Milwaukee Bucks
Johnathan Motley	Free agency	Phoenix Suns
Joakim Noah	Waived	Retired
Malik Fitts	Contract Expired	Utah Jazz
