= Luke Kennard =

American basketball player (born 1996)

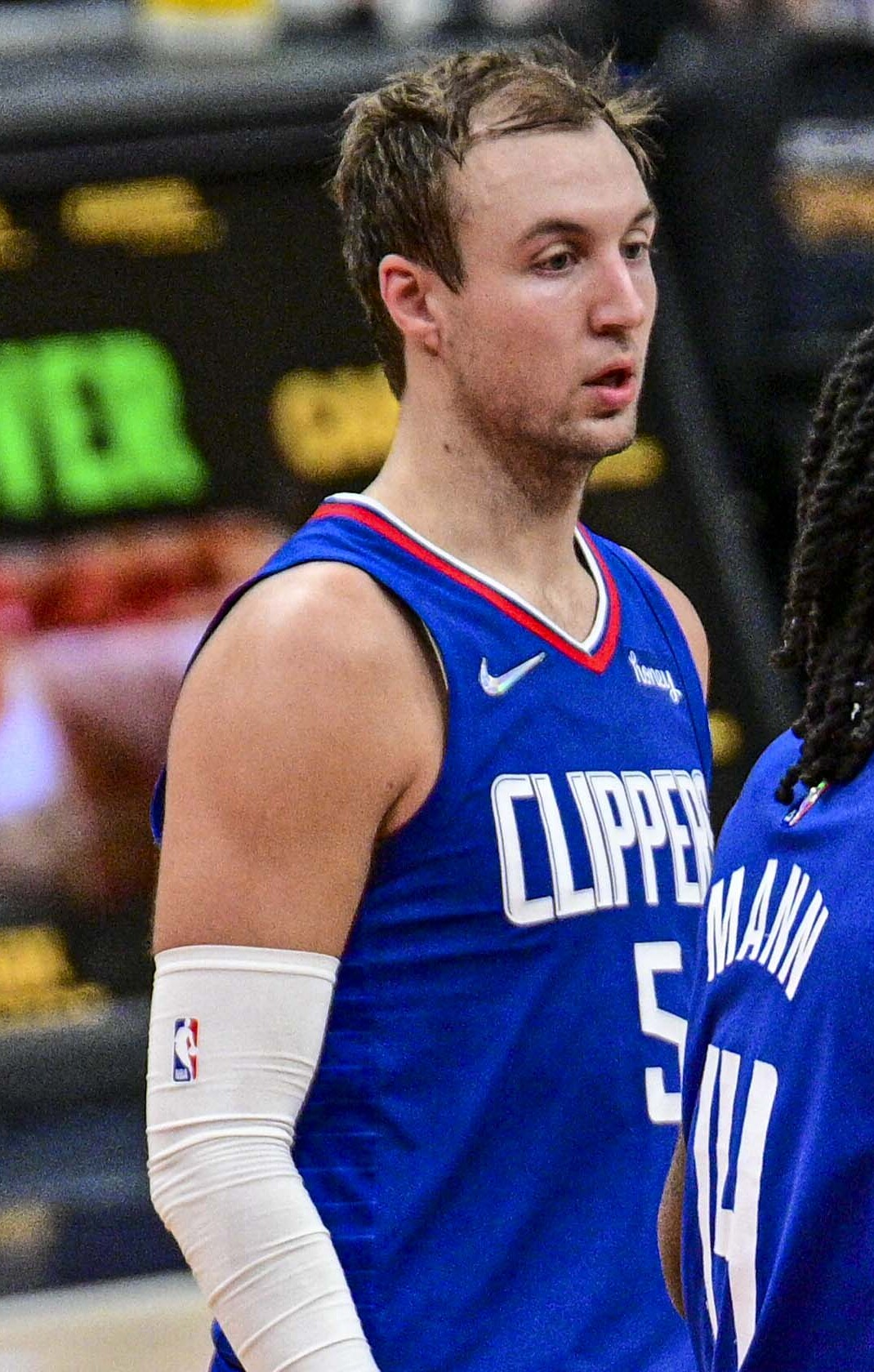
- Kennard with the Los Angeles Clippers in 2022

No. 8 – Phoenix Suns
- Position: Shooting guard
- League: NBA

Personal information
- Born: June 24, 1996 (age 30) Middletown, Ohio, U.S.
- Listed height: 6 ft 5 in (1.96 m)
- Listed weight: 206 lb (93 kg)

Career information
- High school: Franklin (Franklin, Ohio)
- College: Duke (2015–2017)
- NBA draft: 2017: 1st round, 12th overall pick
- Drafted by: Detroit Pistons
- Playing career: 2017–present

Career history
- 2017–2020: Detroit Pistons
- 2017–2018: →Grand Rapids Drive
- 2020–2023: Los Angeles Clippers
- 2023–2025: Memphis Grizzlies
- 2025–2026: Atlanta Hawks
- 2026: Los Angeles Lakers
- 2026–present: Phoenix Suns

Career highlights
- Consensus second-team All-American (2017); First-team All-ACC (2017); ACC tournament MVP (2017); McDonald's All-American (2015); First-team Parade All-American (2015); 2× Ohio Mr. Basketball (2014, 2015)
- Stats at NBA.com
- Stats at Basketball Reference
Medals
Men's basketball
Representing United States
FIBA Americas U18 Championship
| Gold medal – first place | 2014 United States | National team |

Luke Douglas Kennard (/kəˈnɑːrd/ kə-NARD; born June 24, 1996) is an American professional basketball player for the Phoenix Suns of the National Basketball Association (NBA). He played college basketball for the Duke Blue Devils and was drafted by the Detroit Pistons with the 12th pick in the 2017 NBA draft. He has also played for the Los Angeles Clippers, Memphis Grizzlies, Atlanta Hawks, and Los Angeles Lakers. His .4421 three-point field goal percentage currently ranks second in NBA history and first amongst active players. (Note: Minimum 250 career three-point field goals made.)

== High school career ==
Kennard attended Franklin High School in Franklin, Ohio near Dayton. As a senior, he was named the Parade National Player of the Year. He was named the Ohio Gatorade Basketball Player of the Year as junior and senior. He also played high school football, lettering for three years as a quarterback. And though he shot with his left hand in basketball, he threw with his right hand in football.

Finishing high school, Kennard was one of the most sought after recruits in the nation. He was ranked as the No. 24 prospect in his recruiting class by ESPN. Kennard committed to Duke University to play college basketball during his junior year of high school. He finished his career with the second most points in Ohio history, three spots ahead of LeBron James. He was a McDonald's All-American selection.

In 2020, it was announced that Franklin High would retire Kennard's number 10.

== College career ==
=== Freshman season (2015–2016) ===
In practice, he frequently matched up against Duke guard Grayson Allen.

On January 6, 2016, Luke scored 23 points in a 91–75 win over Wake Forest. On February 6, 2016, Kennard tallied 26 points in an 88–80 win over NC State. As a freshman at Duke, Kennard averaged 11.8 points, 3.6 rebounds and 1.5 assists per game.

=== Sophomore season (2016–2017) ===
On November 29, 2016, Kennard scored 20 points in a 78–69 win against Michigan State in ACC–Big Ten Challenge. On December 3, 2016, Kennard scored 35 points in a 94–55 win over Maine. On January 28, 2017, Kennard scored 34 points in an 85–83 win over Wake Forest. On February 11, 2017, Kennard tallied 25 points in a 64–62 victory over Clemson. On March 3, 2017, Luke scored 20 points in a 79–72 victory over Clemson in the second round and scored 24 points in an 81–77 win against Louisville in the quarterfinals of the 2017 ACC tournament. On March 10, 2017, Kennard scored 20 points in a 93–83 win over rival North Carolina in the semifinals. On March 11, 2017, Kennard tallied 16 points in a 75–69 win against Notre Dame in the ACC Championship game.

During his sophomore year, Luke averaged 19.5 points, 5.1 rebounds, and 2.5 assists per game. He led the team both from the three-point range with 43.8% and free throw line at 85.6%. As a sophomore, he was named first team All-ACC and second-team All-American.

He finished 1–6 from the field and fouled out in Duke's second-round loss to South Carolina in the NCAA tournament. His reaction to the final foul call against him quickly turned into a meme.

After his sophomore season, Kennard chose to forgo his final two years of collegiate eligibility and enter the 2017 NBA draft. He joined Duke teammates Jayson Tatum, Harry Giles, and Frank Jackson in declaring early for the draft.

== Professional career ==
=== Detroit Pistons (2017–2020) ===
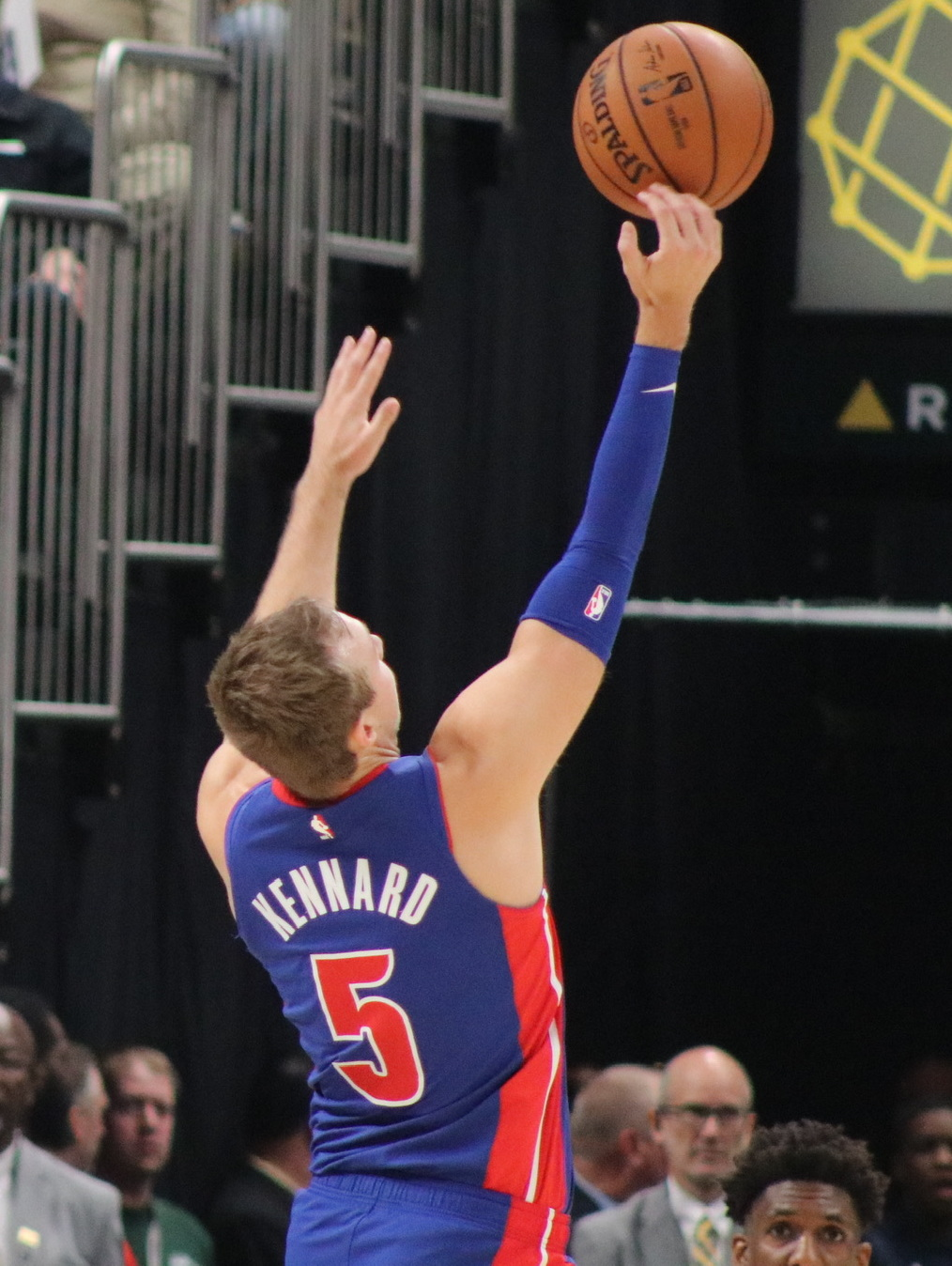
Kennard with the Detroit Pistons in 2019

On June 22, 2017, Kennard was drafted 12th overall by the Detroit Pistons in the 2017 NBA draft.

He made his NBA debut on October 20, 2017, against the Washington Wizards, scoring 11 points and recording 2 steals in 18 minutes. Kennard started his first NBA game on December 15, 2017, after Avery Bradley suffered a groin injury, scoring 9 points with 5 rebounds and 4 assists in a win against the Indiana Pacers. Kennard recorded his first career double-double on January 24, 2018, with 10 points and 10 rebounds. On April 11, 2018, Kennard recorded a former career-high 23 points in a 119–87 victory over the Chicago Bulls.

In July 2018, the Pistons announced that Kennard suffered a left knee strain and would miss the 2018 NBA Summer League. On October 26, 2018, Kennard suffered a sprain of the AC joint in his right shoulder and would be out for at least two weeks. On December 10, 2018, he recorded a career-high 28 points in a 116–102 loss to the Philadelphia 76ers. On April 10, 2019, Kennard recorded 27 points in the last game of the regular season, in a 115–89 win over the New York Knicks.

On October 23, 2019, Kennard scored 30 points and three rebounds in a 119–110 win over the Indiana Pacers. The season was Kennard's first as a full-time starter for the Pistons, but it was cut short after 28 games due to bilateral knee tendinitis and, subsequently, the suspension of the season due to COVID-19.

=== Los Angeles Clippers (2020–2023) ===
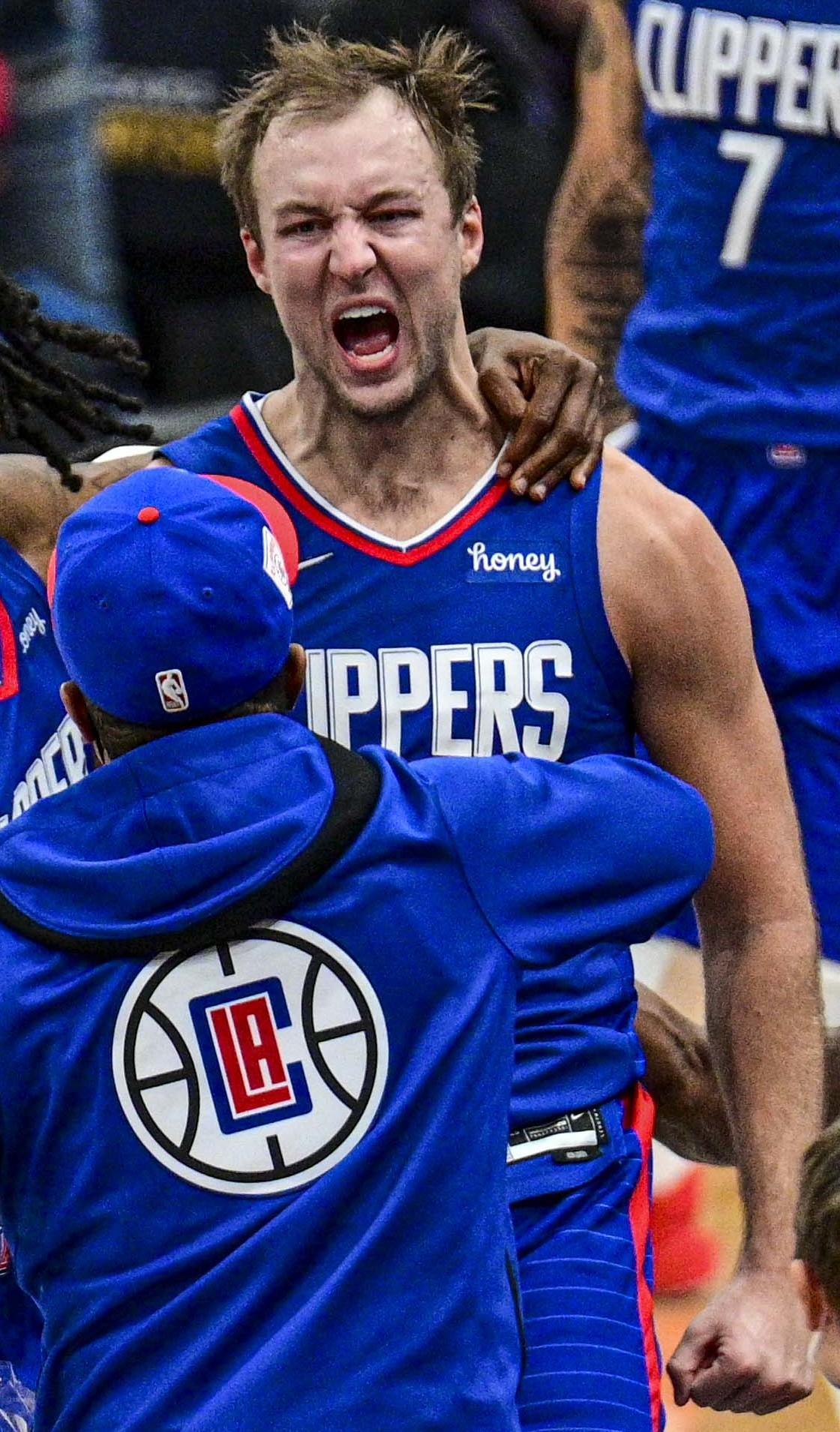
Kennard with the Los Angeles Clippers in 2022

On November 19, 2020, Kennard was traded to the Los Angeles Clippers in a three-team trade that involved the Brooklyn Nets, sending Rodney McGruder, Džanan Musa and the draft rights of Saddiq Bey and Jaylen Hands to Detroit. On December 21, 2020, Kennard signed a four-year, $64 million extension through the 2024–25 season. On March 22, 2021, Kennard posted 20 points on 8-for-8 from the field, including 4-for-4 from 3-point range coming off the bench, along with seven rebounds, four assists and a block in 18 minutes of action in a 119–110 win over the Atlanta Hawks, becoming the first player in franchise history to log at least 20 points, seven rebounds and four assists with less than 20 minutes of playing time in a game.

On December 18, 2021, Kennard scored a season-high 27 points, alongside seven rebounds and three assists, in a 104–103 loss to the Oklahoma City Thunder. On January 25, 2022, he was fouled while shooting a three-pointer and made the shot as well as the free throw, which propelled the Clippers to a 116–115 win over the Washington Wizards. The Clippers had trailed by as many as 35 points during the game. Kennard missed the Clippers’ two postseason play-in tournament games with a hamstring injury, as they were eliminated from playoff contention for the first time since 2018.

=== Memphis Grizzlies (2023–2025) ===
On February 9, 2023, Kennard was traded to the Memphis Grizzlies in a three-team trade involving the Houston Rockets. He made his Grizzlies debut three days later, recording four points and two rebounds in a 119–109 loss to the Boston Celtics. On March 24, Kennard scored a career-high-tying 30 points in a 151–114 win over the Houston Rockets. His ten made 3-pointers set a Grizzlies franchise record for most threes made in a game, surpassing the previous mark (9) set twice by Mike Miller and once by teammate Jaren Jackson Jr.

On July 31, 2024, Kennard re-signed with the Grizzlies on a one-year, $9.25 million contract. He made 65 appearances (11 starts) for Memphis in the 2024–25 NBA season, averaging 8.9 points, 2.8 rebounds, and 3.3 assists.

=== Atlanta Hawks (2025–2026) ===
On July 8, 2025, Kennard signed a one-year, $11 million contract with the Atlanta Hawks. Kennard made 46 appearances off of the bench for Atlanta during the 2025–26 NBA season, averaging 7.9 points, 2.2 rebounds, and 2.1 assists.

=== Los Angeles Lakers (2026) ===
On February 5, 2026, Kennard was traded by the Hawks to the Los Angeles Lakers in exchange for Gabe Vincent and a future second-round pick. On February 7, Kennard made his Lakers debut, putting up 10 points, two assists, and two rebounds in a 105–99 win over the Golden State Warriors. On March 21, he made a game-winning three-pointer in a 105–104 victory over the Orlando Magic. On April 5, Kennard recorded his first career triple-double, putting up 15 points, a career-high 16 rebounds, and 11 assists in a 128–134 loss to the Dallas Mavericks. Kennard made 32 total appearances (including six starts) for Los Angeles, averaging 9.0 points, 2.6 rebounds, and 2.4 assists. In Game 1 of the Lakers' first-round playoff series against the Houston Rockets, Kennard scored a playoff career-high 27 points in a 107–98 win.

=== Phoenix Suns (2026–present) ===
On July 14, 2026, Kennard signed a two-year, $12.4 million contract with the Phoenix Suns.

== Personal life ==
In 2017, Kennard briefly dated television personality Savannah Chrisley. Kennard and long-time girlfriend Anna Castro were married on August 5, 2022. They have a son named Porter Douglas Kennard.

== Career statistics ==
Legend
| GP | Games played | GS | Games started | MPG | Minutes per game |
| FG% | Field goal percentage | 3P% | 3-point field goal percentage | FT% | Free throw percentage |
| RPG | Rebounds per game | APG | Assists per game | SPG | Steals per game |
| BPG | Blocks per game | PPG | Points per game | **Bold** | Career high |
| * | Led the league |

=== NBA ===
==== Regular season ====
| Year | Team | GP | GS | MPG | FG% | 3P% | FT% | RPG | APG | SPG | BPG | PPG |
|---|---|---|---|---|---|---|---|---|---|---|---|---|
| 2017–18 | Detroit | **73** | 9 | 20.0 | .443 | .415 | .855 | 2.4 | 1.7 | .6 | **.2** | 7.6 |
| 2018–19 | Detroit | 63 | 10 | 22.8 | .438 | .394 | .836 | 2.9 | 1.8 | .4 | **.2** | 9.7 |
| 2019–20 | Detroit | 28 | **25** | **32.9** | .442 | .399 | .893 | **3.5** | **4.1** | .4 | **.2** | **15.8** |
| 2020–21 | L.A. Clippers | 63 | 17 | 19.6 | .476 | .446 | .839 | 2.6 | 1.7 | .4 | .1 | 8.3 |
| 2021–22 | L.A. Clippers | 70 | 13 | 27.4 | .449 | .449* | .896 | 3.3 | 2.1 | .6 | .1 | 11.9 |
| 2022–23 | L.A. Clippers | 35 | 11 | 20.7 | .464 | .447* | **.950** | 2.4 | 1.1 | .5 | .1 | 7.8 |
| 2022–23 | Memphis | 24 | 3 | 24.6 | .526 | **.540*** | .947 | 3.1 | 2.3 | .5 | .0 | 11.3 |
| 2023–24 | Memphis | 39 | 22 | 25.6 | .448 | .450 | .889 | 2.9 | 3.5 | .5 | .1 | 11.0 |
| 2024–25 | Memphis | 65 | 11 | 22.6 | .478 | .433 | .895 | 2.8 | 3.3 | **.8** | .1 | 8.9 |
| 2025–26 | Atlanta | 46 | 0 | 20.5 | **.538** | .497* | .914 | 2.2 | 2.1 | .7 | .1 | 7.9 |
| 2025–26 | L.A. Lakers | 32 | 6 | 23.0 | .527 | .448* | .912 | 2.6 | 2.4 | .7 | .1 | 9.0 |
| Career | | 538 | 127 | 23.1 | .466 | .442 | .885 | 2.8 | 2.3 | .6 | .1 | 9.6 |

==== Playoffs ====
| Year | Team | GP | GS | MPG | FG% | 3P% | FT% | RPG | APG | SPG | BPG | PPG |
|---|---|---|---|---|---|---|---|---|---|---|---|---|
| 2019 | Detroit | 4 | 2 | **33.2** | .489 | **.600** | .833 | **4.0** | 1.8 | .8 | **.3** | **15.0** |
| 2021 | L.A. Clippers | **15** | 0 | 14.6 | .477 | .412 | .500 | .9 | .5 | .1 | .0 | 5.6 |
| 2023 | Memphis | 5 | 0 | 21.4 | **.522** | .500 | **1.000** | **4.0** | 1.4 | .8 | .0 | 7.2 |
| 2025 | Memphis | 4 | 0 | 20.0 | .444 | .222 | – | 3.5 | 2.0 | **1.0** | **.3** | 4.5 |
| 2026 | L.A. Lakers | 10 | **5** | 32.6 | .488 | .474 | .826 | 3.5 | **2.3** | .9 | .1 | 11.5 |
| Career | | 38 | 7 | 22.8 | .485 | .450 | .829 | 2.6 | 1.4 | .6 | .1 | 8.2 |

=== College stats ===
| Year | Team | GP | GS | MPG | FG% | 3P% | FT% | RPG | APG | SPG | BPG | PPG |
|---|---|---|---|---|---|---|---|---|---|---|---|---|
| 2015–16 | Duke | 36 | 11 | 26.7 | .421 | .320 | **.889** | 3.6 | 1.5 | **.9** | .2 | 11.8 |
| 2016–17 | Duke | **37** | **36** | **35.5** | **.489** | **.438** | .856 | **5.1** | **2.5** | .8 | **.4** | **19.5** |
| Career | | 73 | 47 | 31.1 | .455 | .379 | .873 | 4.4 | 2.0 | .9 | .3 | 15.7 |

== See also ==
- List of NBA career 3-point field goal percentage leaders
- List of NBA annual 3-point field goal percentage leaders
- 50–40–90 club
