= Terance Mann =

American basketball player (born 1996)

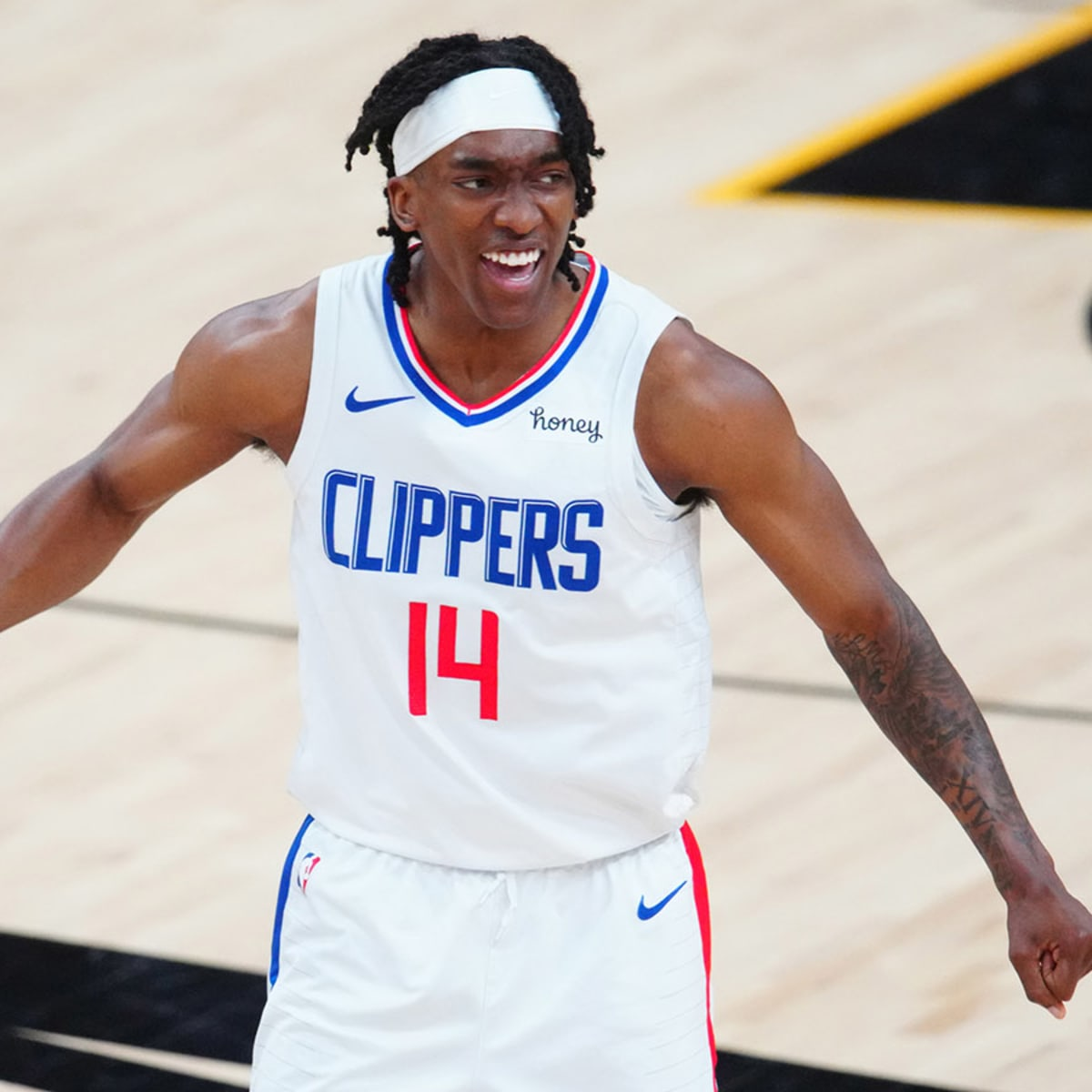
- Mann with the Los Angeles Clippers in 2021

No. 14 – Brooklyn Nets
- Position: Shooting guard / small forward
- League: NBA

Personal information
- Born: October 18, 1996 (age 30) Brooklyn, New York, U.S.
- Listed height: 6 ft 5 in (1.96 m)
- Listed weight: 220 lb (100 kg)

Career information
- High school: Tilton School (Tilton, New Hampshire)
- College: Florida State (2015–2019)
- NBA draft: 2019: 2nd round, 48th overall pick
- Drafted by: Los Angeles Clippers
- Playing career: 2019–present

Career history
- 2019–2025: Los Angeles Clippers
- 2019–2020: →Agua Caliente Clippers
- 2025: Atlanta Hawks
- 2025–present: Brooklyn Nets
- Stats at NBA.com
- Stats at Basketball Reference

Terance Stanley Mann (born October 18, 1996) is an American professional basketball player for the Brooklyn Nets of the National Basketball Association (NBA). He played college basketball for the Florida State Seminoles. Mann was drafted by the Los Angeles Clippers in the 2019 NBA draft with the 48th overall pick. Mann played six seasons with the Clippers before being traded to the Atlanta Hawks in 2025.

== Early life ==
Mann was born in Brooklyn, New York and moved to Lowell, Massachusetts at the age of 10. His parents are from Saint Lucia. Mann's mother, Daynia La-Force, coached women's basketball at Rhode Island. He played for the Hillside School in Massachusetts and the Tilton School in New Hampshire. At Tilton School, he averaged 23.1 points and 7.8 rebounds per game as a senior. He led the school to a 31–5 record and the New England Preparatory School Athletic Conference Class AA championship. Mann was a First Team All-NEPSAC selection. Mann was a four-star recruit and signed with Florida State, turning down offers from Indiana, Boston College, Iowa, Maryland, Florida and West Virginia.

== College career ==
As a freshman at Florida State, Mann averaged 5.2 points and 17.0 minutes per game playing behind Malik Beasley and Dwayne Bacon. He was named a captain as a sophomore and posted 8.4 points and 4.5 rebounds per game. Mann came down with a torn abdominal and groin muscle in the first round of the 2017 NCAA Tournament and was limited as the Seminoles reached the Elite Eight.

Mann posted 12.6 points, 5.4 rebounds and 2.6 assists per game as a junior. As a senior, Mann averaged 11.4 points and 6.5 rebounds per game. He led the team to a 29–8 record and the Sweet Sixteen of the NCAA Tournament. He finished his career as the third player in school history with over 1,200 points, 600 rebounds, 200 assists and 100 steals.

== Professional career ==
=== Los Angeles Clippers (2019–2025) ===
Mann was drafted with the 48th pick of the 2019 NBA draft by the Los Angeles Clippers. He played for the Clippers in the 2019 NBA Summer League. On July 9, 2019, the Clippers announced that they had signed Mann. On October 24, 2019, Mann made his NBA debut, coming off the bench in a 141–122 win over the Golden State Warriors with a rebound. On March 18, 2020, the Clippers announced that Mann had undergone surgery to repair a ligament in his right hand. On August 14, 2020, in a game against the Oklahoma City Thunder, Mann recorded a then-career-high 25 points, 14 rebounds and nine assists in 42 minutes.

During the 2021 Western Conference Semifinals, with Kawhi Leonard being injured, Mann was put in the starting lineup. In game 6, Mann dropped a career-high 39 points on 7-of-10 shooting from three-point range in a 131–119 victory, sparking a 25-point comeback and leading the Clippers to the Western Conference Finals for the first time in franchise history.

On October 12, 2021, Mann signed a two-year, $22 million contract extension.

On January 15, 2023, Mann scored a season-high 31 points during a 121–100 win over the Houston Rockets.

On September 27, 2024, Mann agreed to a three-year, $47 million contract extension with the Clippers.

=== Atlanta Hawks (2025) ===
On February 6, 2025, Mann and Bones Hyland were traded to the Atlanta Hawks in exchange for guard Bogdan Bogdanović, and three second-round draft picks. On February 26, 2025, Mann recorded 13 points, 4 rebounds and 4 assists while coming off the bench in a 131–109 loss against the Miami Heat. On March 10, 2025, Mann would have of his best games with the Hawks in which he recorded a team-high 19 points along with 6 rebounds and 4 assists in 33 minutes of action off the bench in a 132–123 win against the Philadelphia 76ers. On April 13, 2025, during the final game of the regular season, Mann was put in the starting lineup for the first time as a member of the Hawks in which he tied his team-high 19 points, while recording 4 assists and 3 rebounds in a 117–105 win against the Orlando Magic.

=== Brooklyn Nets (2025–present) ===
On July 7, 2025, Mann and the draft rights to Drake Powell (the 22nd pick in the 2025 NBA draft) were traded to the Brooklyn Nets in a three-team trade that sent the Boston Celtics' Kristaps Porziņģis and a second-round pick to the Hawks, and Georges Niang and a second-round pick to the Celtics.

== Executive career ==
On April 4, 2025, Mann was hired to serve as the assistant general manager for his alma mater, Florida State, under new head coach Luke Loucks.

== Career statistics ==
Legend
GP	Games played	GS	Games started	MPG	Minutes per game
FG%	Field goal percentage	3P%	3-point field goal percentage	FT%	Free throw percentage
RPG	Rebounds per game	APG	Assists per game	SPG	Steals per game
BPG	Blocks per game	PPG	Points per game	**Bold**	Career high

=== NBA ===
==== Regular season ====
Year	Team	GP	GS	MPG	FG%	3P%	FT%	RPG	APG	SPG	BPG	PPG
2019–20	L.A. Clippers	41	6	8.8	.468	.350	.667	1.3	1.3	.3	.1	2.4
2020–21	L.A. Clippers	67	10	18.9	.509	**.418**	.830	3.6	1.6	.4	.2	7.0
2021–22	L.A. Clippers	**81**	33	**28.6**	.484	.365	.780	**5.2**	2.6	.7	**.3**	**10.8**
2022–23	L.A. Clippers	**81**	36	23.1	.519	.389	.780	3.4	2.3	.5	**.3**	8.8
2023–24	L.A. Clippers	75	**71**	25.0	.515	.348	**.832**	3.4	1.6	.6	.2	8.8
2024–25	L.A. Clippers	37	12	19.8	.446	.347	.719	2.9	1.6	**.8**	**.3**	6.0
2024–25	Atlanta	30	1	22.7	**.541**	.386	.667	3.1	2.1	.6	.1	9.8
2025–26	Brooklyn	63	51	24.3	.457	.364	.788	3.2	**3.0**	.7	.2	7.2
Career		475	220	22.4	.496	.371	.782	3.5	2.1	.6	.2	8.0

==== Playoffs ====
Year	Team	GP	GS	MPG	FG%	3P%	FT%	RPG	APG	SPG	BPG	PPG
2020	L.A. Clippers	13	0	2.1	.400	.000	—	.5	.1	.1	.0	.3
2021	L.A. Clippers	**19**	**6**	19.9	.519	.432	.714	2.7	.7	.5	**.3**	7.6
2023	L.A. Clippers	5	0	26.6	**.576**	**.474**	.667	3.2	**2.2**	**.8**	.2	**10.6**
2024	L.A. Clippers	6	**6**	**31.2**	.413	.455	**1.000**	**5.0**	1.8	.0	.0	9.3
Career		43	12	16.9	.500	.438	.756	2.4	.9	.3	.1	6.0

=== College ===
Year	Team	GP	GS	MPG	FG%	3P%	FT%	RPG	APG	SPG	BPG	PPG
2015–16	Florida State	34	0	17.0	**.584**	.308	.458	3.7	.9	.6	.2	5.2
2016–17	Florida State	35	34	25.0	.576	.304	.663	4.5	1.7	**1.0**	.2	8.4
2017–18	Florida State	34	31	29.2	.568	.250	.655	5.4	**2.6**	.9	**.3**	**12.6**
2018–19	Florida State	**37**	**36**	**31.7**	.505	**.390**	**.790**	**6.5**	2.5	.7	**.3**	11.4
Career		140	101	25.9	.552	.327	.670	5.1	1.9	.8	.2	9.4
