= 2023–24 New York Knicks season =

Season of National Basketball Association team the New York Knicks

- Head coach: Tom Thibodeau
- President: Leon Rose
- Owners: Madison Square Garden Sports
- Arena: Madison Square Garden

Results
- Record: 50–32 (.610)
- Place: Division: 2nd (Atlantic); Conference: 2nd (Eastern)
- Playoff finish: Conference semifinals (lost to Pacers 3–4)
- Stats at Basketball Reference

Local media
- Television: MSG TV
- Radio: WEPN-FM

The 2023–24 New York Knicks season was the 78th season of the franchise in the National Basketball Association (NBA). This would be the last season with 3-time All-Star Julius Randle, as on October 2nd, 2024, him and Donte DiVincenzo would be traded to the Minnesota Timberwolves for (at the time) 4-time All-Star Karl-Anthony Towns.

The Knicks reached the knockout stage of the 2023 NBA In-Season Tournament as the East wildcard, finishing the group stage with a 3–1 record and the highest point differential among second-place teams in the East. However, they were eliminated in the quarterfinals with a loss to the top-seeded Milwaukee Bucks.

On December 30, the Knicks traded RJ Barrett, Immanuel Quickley, and a second-round pick to the Toronto Raptors in exchange for OG Anunoby, Precious Achiuwa, and Malachi Flynn. Anunoby made an immediate impact with the Knicks, recording an NBA-record plus-minus of 170 in his first ten games with the team and propelling the Knicks to a 14–2 record in January, which included winning streaks of six and nine games.

On January 27, 2024, star forward Julius Randle dislocated his right shoulder late in the 4th quarter in a game against the Miami Heat. The injury sidelined Randle for weeks, with many around the Knicks organization hoping he would be able to heal in time before the playoffs. On April 4, the team announced Randle would undergo season-ending surgery on his shoulder.

On April 11, the Knicks got their 48th win of the season against the top–seeded Boston Celtics, meaning the Knicks improved over last season's 47–35 record. Their final 120–119 overtime win over the Chicago Bulls also gave New York their first 50-win season since 2013 and allowed them to finish the regular season as the second seed in the Eastern Conference.

In the playoffs, the Knicks beat the Philadelphia 76ers in six games in the first round. Decimated by injuries, they were upset by the Indiana Pacers in seven games in the second round.

The New York Knicks drew an average home attendance of 19,728 in 41 home games in the 2023–24 NBA season.

== Draft ==
The Knicks entered this draft with no draft pick. They have traded their original selections to the Portland Trail Blazers, losing the first-round pick's lottery protection when New York qualified for the 2023 NBA playoffs, and the Charlotte Hornets, who eventually traded the second-round pick to the Minnesota Timberwolves.

== Roster ==
2023–24 New York Knicks roster
Players

Pos.	No.	Player	Height	Weight	DOB	From
F/C	5	Precious Achiuwa	6 ft 8 in (2.03 m)	243 lb (110 kg)	1999-09-19	Memphis
F	8	OG Anunoby	6 ft 7 in (2.01 m)	240 lb (109 kg)	1997-07-17	Indiana
F	44	Bojan Bogdanović (injured)	6 ft 7 in (2.01 m)	226 lb (103 kg)	1989-04-18	Croatia
G	4	Charlie Jr. Brown (TW)	6 ft 6 in (1.98 m)	199 lb (90 kg)	1997-02-02	Saint Joseph's
G	11	Jalen Brunson	6 ft 2 in (1.88 m)	190 lb (86 kg)	1996-08-31	Villanova
G	18	Alec Burks	6 ft 5 in (1.96 m)	214 lb (97 kg)	1991-07-20	Colorado
F	25	Mamadi Diakite	6 ft 9 in (2.06 m)	228 lb (103 kg)	1997-01-21	Virginia
G	0	Donte DiVincenzo	6 ft 4 in (1.93 m)	203 lb (92 kg)	1997-01-31	Villanova
G/F	3	Josh Hart	6 ft 4 in (1.93 m)	215 lb (98 kg)	1995-03-06	Villanova
C	55	Isaiah Hartenstein	7 ft 0 in (2.13 m)	250 lb (113 kg)	1998-05-05	Germany
G/F	21	DaQuan Jeffries	6 ft 5 in (1.96 m)	222 lb (101 kg)	1997-08-30	Tulsa
G	2	Miles McBride	6 ft 1 in (1.85 m)	195 lb (88 kg)	2000-09-08	West Virginia
G/F	13	Shake Milton	6 ft 5 in (1.96 m)	205 lb (93 kg)	1996-09-26	SMU
F	30	Julius Randle (injured)	6 ft 8 in (2.03 m)	250 lb (113 kg)	1994-11-29	Kentucky
C	23	Mitchell Robinson (injured)	7 ft 0 in (2.13 m)	240 lb (109 kg)	1998-04-01	Chalmette HS (LA)
C	45	Jericho Sims	6 ft 10 in (2.08 m)	250 lb (113 kg)	1998-10-20	Texas
F	00	Jacob Toppin (TW)	6 ft 8 in (2.03 m)	200 lb (91 kg)	2000-05-08	Kentucky
G	1	Duane Jr. Washington (TW)	6 ft 2 in (1.88 m)	197 lb (89 kg)	2000-03-24	Ohio State

Coaches
Head coach
- Tom Thibodeau
Assistant(s)
- Daniel Brady
- Rick Brunson
- Johnnie Bryant (associate HC)
- Darren Erman
- Andy Greer
- Larry Greer
- Othella Harrington
- Daisuke Yoshimoto

Legend
- (DP) Unsigned draft pick
- (FA) Free agent
- (S) Suspended
- (GL) On assignment to G League affiliate
- (TW) Two-way affiliate player
- Injured

Roster
Updated: March 25, 2024

== Standings ==
=== Division ===
Atlantic Division	W	L	PCT	GB	Home	Road	Div	GP
z – Boston Celtics	64	18	.780	–	37‍–‍4	27‍–‍14	15‍–‍2	82
x – New York Knicks	50	32	.610	14.0	27‍–‍14	23‍–‍18	12‍–‍5	82
x – Philadelphia 76ers	47	35	.573	17.0	25‍–‍16	22‍–‍19	8‍–‍8	82
Brooklyn Nets	32	50	.390	32.0	20‍–‍21	12‍–‍29	5‍–‍11	82
Toronto Raptors	25	57	.305	39.0	14‍–‍27	11‍–‍30	1‍–‍15	82

=== Conference ===
Eastern Conference
#	Team	W	L	PCT	GB	GP
1	z – Boston Celtics *	64	18	.780	–	82
2	x – New York Knicks	50	32	.610	14.0	82
3	y – Milwaukee Bucks *	49	33	.598	15.0	82
4	x – Cleveland Cavaliers	48	34	.585	16.0	82
5	y – Orlando Magic *	47	35	.573	17.0	82
6	x – Indiana Pacers	47	35	.573	17.0	82
7	x – Philadelphia 76ers	47	35	.573	17.0	82
8	x – Miami Heat	46	36	.561	18.0	82
9	pi – Chicago Bulls	39	43	.476	25.0	82
10	pi – Atlanta Hawks	36	46	.439	28.0	82
11	Brooklyn Nets	32	50	.390	32.0	82
12	Toronto Raptors	25	57	.305	39.0	82
13	Charlotte Hornets	21	61	.256	43.0	82
14	Washington Wizards	15	67	.183	49.0	82
15	Detroit Pistons	14	68	.171	50.0	82

== Game log ==
=== Preseason ===
2023 preseason game log
Total: 1–3 (Home: 1–2; Road: 0–1)
Preseason: 1–3 (home: 1–2; road: 0–1)

Game	Date	Team	Score	High points	High rebounds	High assists	Location Attendance	Record
1	October 9	Boston	W 114–107	Immanuel Quickley (21)	Robinson, Sims (7)	Grimes, McBride (4)	Madison Square Garden; 19,512	1–0
2	October 14	Minnesota	L 112–121	RJ Barrett (23)	Julius Randle (8)	Brunson, Randle (4)	Madison Square Garden; 19,018	1–1
3	October 17	@ Boston	L 110–123	Quentin Grimes (22)	Jericho Sims (10)	Miles McBride (6)	TD Garden; 19,156	1–2
4	October 18	Washington	L 106–131	Julius Randle (20)	Mitchell Robinson (11)	Brunson, McBride (5)	Madison Square Garden; 18,881	1–3

2023–24 preseason schedule

=== Regular season ===
This became the first regular season where all the NBA teams competed in a mid-season tournament setting due to the implementation of the 2023 NBA In-Season Tournament.

2023–24 game log
Total: 50–32 (Home: 27–14; Road: 23–18)
October: 2–2 (home: 0–1; road: 2–1)

Game	Date	Team	Score	High points	High rebounds	High assists	Location Attendance	Record
1	October 25	Boston	L 104–108	Barrett, Quickley (24)	Julius Randle (11)	Julius Randle (7)	Madison Square Garden; 19,812	0–1
2	October 27	@ Atlanta	W 126–120	Jalen Brunson (31)	Mitchell Robinson (13)	Julius Randle (9)	State Farm Arena; 17,692	1–1
3	October 28	@ New Orleans	L 87–96	RJ Barrett (18)	Mitchell Robinson (15)	Jalen Brunson (5)	Smoothie King Center; 16,331	1–2
4	October 31	@ Cleveland	W 109–91	Brunson, Randle (19)	Julius Randle (10)	Donte DiVincenzo (6)	Rocket Mortgage FieldHouse; 19,432	2–2

November: 9–5 (home: 6–2; road: 3–3)

Game	Date	Team	Score	High points	High rebounds	High assists	Location Attendance	Record
5	November 1	Cleveland	L 89–95	Jalen Brunson (24)	Mitchell Robinson (16)	Brunson, Quickley, Randle (4)	Madison Square Garden; 19,812	2–3
6	November 3	@ Milwaukee	L 105–110	Jalen Brunson (45)	Mitchell Robinson (15)	Hart, Randle (5)	Fiserv Forum; 17,717	2–4
7	November 6	L.A. Clippers	W 111–97	Julius Randle (27)	Mitchell Robinson (15)	Josh Hart (7)	Madison Square Garden; 19,812	3–4
8	November 8	San Antonio	W 126–105	Jalen Brunson (25)	Julius Randle (16)	Barrett, Brunson (6)	Madison Square Garden; 19,812	4–4
9	November 12	Charlotte	W 129–107	RJ Barrett (24)	Mitchell Robinson (9)	Immanuel Quickley (9)	Madison Square Garden; 19,812	5–4
10	November 13	@ Boston	L 98–114	Jalen Brunson (26)	Hart, Randle (9)	Julius Randle (5)	TD Garden; 19,156	5–5
11	November 15	@ Atlanta	W 116–114	Julius Randle (29)	Mitchell Robinson (15)	Brunson, Randle (8)	State Farm Arena; 17,060	6–5
12	November 17	@ Washington	W 120–99	Jalen Brunson (32)	Hartenstein, Robinson (8)	Julius Randle (8)	Capital One Arena; 16,886	7–5
13	November 18	@ Charlotte	W 122–108	Jalen Brunson (32)	Mitchell Robinson (14)	Julius Randle (8)	Spectrum Center; 19,171	8–5
14	November 20	@ Minnesota	L 100–117	Jalen Brunson (25)	Julius Randle (14)	Jalen Brunson (6)	Target Center; 18,024	8–6
15	November 24	Miami	W 100–98	Jalen Brunson (24)	Hart, Randle (8)	Julius Randle (7)	Madison Square Garden; 19,812	9–6
16	November 26	Phoenix	L 113–116	Jalen Brunson (35)	Mitchell Robinson (11)	Jalen Brunson (8)	Madison Square Garden; 19,812	9–7
17	November 28	Charlotte	W 115–91	Julius Randle (25)	Julius Randle (20)	Jalen Brunson (7)	Madison Square Garden; 19,111	10–7
18	November 30	Detroit	W 118–112	Jalen Brunson (42)	Julius Randle (10)	Brunson, Randle (8)	Madison Square Garden; 19,812	11–7

December: 6–8 (home: 2–1; road: 4–7)

Game	Date	Team	Score	High points	High rebounds	High assists	Location Attendance	Record
19	December 1	@ Toronto	W 119–106	Jalen Brunson (22)	Julius Randle (10)	Julius Randle (9)	Scotiabank Arena; 19,800	12–7
20	December 5	@ Milwaukee	L 122–146	Julius Randle (41)	RJ Barrett (8)	Jalen Brunson (6)	Fiserv Forum; 17,448	12–8
21	December 8	@ Boston	L 123–133	Barrett, Brunson (23)	Isaiah Hartenstein (16)	Josh Hart (7)	TD Garden; 19,156	12–9
22	December 11	Toronto	W 136–130	Julius Randle (34)	Hartenstein, Randle (8)	Jalen Brunson (9)	Madison Square Garden; 19,812	13–9
23	December 13	@ Utah	L 113–117	Julius Randle (32)	Julius Randle (12)	Jalen Brunson (8)	Delta Center; 18,206	13–10
24	December 15	@ Phoenix	W 139–122	Jalen Brunson (50)	Hartenstein, Randle (8)	Jalen Brunson (9)	Footprint Center; 17,071	14–10
25	December 16	@ L.A. Clippers	L 122–144	Brunson, Randle (22)	Isaiah Hartenstein (10)	Jalen Brunson (6)	Crypto.com Arena; 19,370	14–11
26	December 18	@ L.A. Lakers	W 114–109	Jalen Brunson (29)	Isaiah Hartenstein (17)	RJ Barrett (4)	Crypto.com Arena; 18,997	15–11
27	December 20	@ Brooklyn	W 121–102	Julius Randle (26)	Josh Hart (13)	Jalen Brunson (8)	Barclays Center; 18,071	16–11
28	December 23	Milwaukee	L 111–130	Jalen Brunson (36)	Isaiah Hartenstein (13)	Jalen Brunson (7)	Madison Square Garden; 19,812	16–12
29	December 25	Milwaukee	W 129–122	Jalen Brunson (38)	Hart, Randle (9)	Jalen Brunson (6)	Madison Square Garden; 19,812	17–12
30	December 27	@ Oklahoma City	L 120–129	Julius Randle (25)	Randle, Hartenstein (9)	Jalen Brunson (7)	Paycom Center; 18,203	17–13
31	December 29	@ Orlando	L 108–117	Julius Randle (38)	Julius Randle (12)	Jalen Brunson (8)	Kia Center; 19,587	17–14
32	December 30	@ Indiana	L 126–140	Donte DiVincenzo (38)	Julius Randle (12)	Brunson, Hartenstein (6)	Gainbridge Fieldhouse; 17,274	17–15

January: 14–2 (home: 9–1; road: 5–1)

Game	Date	Team	Score	High points	High rebounds	High assists	Location Attendance	Record
33	January 1	Minnesota	W 112–106	Julius Randle (39)	Josh Hart (11)	Jalen Brunson (14)	Madison Square Garden; 19,812	18–15
34	January 3	Chicago	W 116–100	Julius Randle (35)	Isaiah Hartenstein (20)	Jalen Brunson (13)	Madison Square Garden; 19,812	19–15
35	January 5	@ Philadelphia	W 128–92	Jalen Brunson (29)	Josh Hart (15)	Josh Hart (6)	Wells Fargo Center; 20,461	20–15
36	January 6	@ Washington	W 121–105	Julius Randle (39)	Isaiah Hartenstein (19)	Jalen Brunson (8)	Capital One Arena; 20,333	21–15
37	January 9	Portland	W 112–84	OG Anunoby (23)	Isaiah Hartenstein (14)	Julius Randle (8)	Madison Square Garden; 19,812	22–15
38	January 11	@ Dallas	L 124–128	Julius Randle (32)	Isaiah Hartenstein (15)	Jalen Brunson (8)	American Airlines Center; 20,040	22–16
39	January 13	@ Memphis	W 106–94	Julius Randle (24)	Isaiah Hartenstein (20)	Randle, McBride (5)	FedExForum; 16,598	23–16
40	January 15	Orlando	L 94–98	Miles McBride (20)	Isaiah Hartenstein (12)	Julius Randle (5)	Madison Square Garden; 19,812	23–17
41	January 17	Houston	W 109–94	Julius Randle (31)	Josh Hart (14)	Jalen Brunson (7)	Madison Square Garden; 19,439	24–17
42	January 18	Washington	W 113–109	Jalen Brunson (41)	Isaiah Hartenstein (17)	Jalen Brunson (8)	Madison Square Garden; 19,466	25–17
43	January 20	Toronto	W 126–100	Jalen Brunson (38)	Julius Randle (16)	Julius Randle (10)	Madison Square Garden; 19,812	26–17
44	January 23	@ Brooklyn	W 108–103	Brunson, Randle (30)	Achiuwa, Randle (9)	Julius Randle (7)	Barclays Center; 17,732	27–17
45	January 25	Denver	W 122–84	OG Anunoby (26)	Precious Achiuwa (10)	Julius Randle (8)	Madison Square Garden; 19,812	28–17
46	January 27	Miami	W 125–109	Jalen Brunson (32)	Precious Achiuwa (10)	Jalen Brunson (8)	Madison Square Garden; 19,812	29–17
47	January 29	@ Charlotte	W 113–92	Jalen Brunson (32)	Josh Hart (12)	Brunson, Hart (7)	Spectrum Center; 15,546	30–17
48	January 30	Utah	W 118–103	Donte DiVincenzo (33)	Isaiah Hartenstein (12)	Josh Hart (10)	Madison Square Garden; 19,133	31–17

February: 4–8 (home: 3–6; road: 1–2)

Game	Date	Team	Score	High points	High rebounds	High assists	Location Attendance	Record
49	February 1	Indiana	W 109–105	Jalen Brunson (40)	Isaiah Hartenstein (19)	Isaiah Hartenstein (6)	Madison Square Garden; 19,812	32–17
50	February 3	L.A. Lakers	L 105–113	Jalen Brunson (36)	Isaiah Hartenstein (15)	Jalen Brunson (10)	Madison Square Garden; 19,812	32–18
51	February 6	Memphis	W 123–113	Donte DiVincenzo (32)	Josh Hart (10)	Jalen Brunson (8)	Madison Square Garden; 19,013	33–18
52	February 8	Dallas	L 108–122	Donte DiVincenzo (36)	Precious Achiuwa (16)	Josh Hart (12)	Madison Square Garden; 19,812	33–19
53	February 10	Indiana	L 111–125	Jalen Brunson (39)	Josh Hart (10)	Josh Hart (5)	Madison Square Garden; 19,812	33–20
54	February 12	@ Houston	L 103–105	Jalen Brunson (27)	Precious Achiuwa (17)	Jalen Brunson (7)	Toyota Center; 16,790	33–21
55	February 14	@ Orlando	L 100–118	Jalen Brunson (33)	Precious Achiuwa (14)	Jalen Brunson (6)	Kia Center; 19,259	33–22
All-Star Game
56	February 22	@ Philadelphia	W 110–96	Bojan Bogdanović (22)	Josh Hart (12)	Jalen Brunson (12)	Wells Fargo Center; 21,094	34–22
57	February 24	Boston	L 102–116	Jalen Brunson (34)	Precious Achiuwa (9)	Jalen Brunson (9)	Madison Square Garden; 19,812	34–23
58	February 26	Detroit	W 113–111	Jalen Brunson (35)	Precious Achiuwa (11)	Jalen Brunson (12)	Madison Square Garden; 19,303	35–23
59	February 27	New Orleans	L 92–115	Donte DiVincenzo (23)	Josh Hart (10)	Miles McBride (8)	Madison Square Garden; 19,812	35–24
60	February 29	Golden State	L 99–110	Jalen Brunson (27)	Josh Hart (18)	Josh Hart (7)	Madison Square Garden; 19,812	35–25

March: 9–5 (home: 4–3; road: 5–2)

Game	Date	Team	Score	High points	High rebounds	High assists	Location Attendance	Record
61	March 3	@ Cleveland	W 107–98	Donte DiVincenzo (28)	Josh Hart (19)	Josh Hart (10)	Rocket Mortgage FieldHouse; 19,432	36–25
62	March 5	Atlanta	L 100–116	Donte DiVincenzo (21)	Jericho Sims (9)	Miles McBride (9)	Madison Square Garden; 19,812	36–26
63	March 8	Orlando	W 98–74	Jalen Brunson (26)	Precious Achiuwa (14)	Donte DiVincenzo (6)	Madison Square Garden; 19,812	37–26
64	March 10	Philadelphia	L 73–79	Jalen Brunson (19)	Josh Hart (11)	Jalen Brunson (8)	Madison Square Garden; 19,812	37–27
65	March 12	Philadelphia	W 106–79	Brunson, Hart (20)	Josh Hart (19)	Josh Hart (10)	Madison Square Garden; 19,812	38–27
66	March 14	@ Portland	W 105–93	Jalen Brunson (45)	Josh Hart (15)	Jalen Brunson (4)	Moda Center; 17,768	39–27
67	March 16	@ Sacramento	W 98–91	Jalen Brunson (42)	Isaiah Hartenstein (14)	Precious Achiuwa (4)	Golden 1 Center; 18,311	40–27
68	March 18	@ Golden State	W 119–112	Jalen Brunson (34)	Josh Hart (11)	Josh Hart (11)	Chase Center; 18,064	41–27
69	March 21	@ Denver	L 100–113	Jalen Brunson (26)	Isaiah Hartenstein (8)	Jalen Brunson (9)	Ball Arena; 19,811	41–28
70	March 23	Brooklyn	W 105–93	Donte DiVincenzo (31)	Josh Hart (13)	Jalen Brunson (8)	Madison Square Garden; 19,812	42–28
71	March 25	Detroit	W 124–99	Donte DiVincenzo (40)	Precious Achiuwa (16)	Josh Hart (10)	Madison Square Garden; 19,812	43–28
72	March 27	@ Toronto	W 145–101	Miles McBride (29)	Precious Achiuwa (12)	Josh Hart (10)	Scotiabank Arena; 19,133	44–28
73	March 29	@ San Antonio	L 126–130 (OT)	Jalen Brunson (61)	Hart, Robinson (12)	Josh Hart (8)	Frost Bank Center; 18,604	44–29
74	March 31	Oklahoma City	L 112–113	Jalen Brunson (30)	Josh Hart (15)	Jalen Brunson (7)	Madison Square Garden; 19,812	44–30

April: 6–2 (home: 3–0; road: 3–2)

Game	Date	Team	Score	High points	High rebounds	High assists	Location Attendance	Record
75	April 2	@ Miami	L 99–109	Donte DiVincenzo (31)	Achiuwa, Bogdanović, Hart (6)	Jalen Brunson (10)	Kaseya Center; 19,857	44–31
76	April 4	Sacramento	W 120–109	Jalen Brunson (35)	Josh Hart (9)	Jalen Brunson (11)	Madison Square Garden; 19,812	45–31
77	April 5	@ Chicago	L 100–108	Jalen Brunson (35)	Hartenstein, McBride (7)	Jalen Brunson (11)	United Center; 21,599	45–32
78	April 7	@ Milwaukee	W 122–109	Jalen Brunson (43)	Isaiah Hartenstein (10)	Josh Hart (9)	Fiserv Forum; 17,536	46–32
79	April 9	@ Chicago	W 128–117	Jalen Brunson (45)	Josh Hart (13)	Jalen Brunson (8)	United Center; 21,648	47–32
80	April 11	@ Boston	W 118–109	Jalen Brunson (39)	Josh Hart (16)	Isaiah Hartenstein (6)	TD Garden; 19,156	48–32
81	April 12	Brooklyn	W 111–107	Jalen Brunson (30)	Mitchell Robinson (8)	Jalen Brunson (11)	Madison Square Garden; 19,812	49–32
82	April 14	Chicago	W 120–119 (OT)	Jalen Brunson (40)	Isaiah Hartenstein (13)	Jalen Brunson (7)	Madison Square Garden; 19,812	50–32

2023–24 season schedule

=== Playoffs ===
2024 playoff game log
Total: 7–6 (home: 5–2; road: 2–4)
First round: 4–2 (home: 2–1; road: 2–1)

Game	Date	Team	Score	High points	High rebounds	High assists	Location Attendance	Series
1	April 20	Philadelphia	W 111–104	Hart, Brunson (22)	Josh Hart (13)	Jalen Brunson (7)	Madison Square Garden; 19,812	1–0
2	April 22	Philadelphia	W 104–101	Jalen Brunson (24)	Josh Hart (15)	Jalen Brunson (6)	Madison Square Garden; 19,812	2–0
3	April 25	@ Philadelphia	L 114–125	Jalen Brunson (39)	Mitchell Robinson (7)	Jalen Brunson (13)	Wells Fargo Center; 21,116	2–1
4	April 28	@ Philadelphia	W 97–92	Jalen Brunson (47)	Josh Hart (17)	Jalen Brunson (10)	Wells Fargo Center; 21,048	3–1
5	April 30	Philadelphia	L 106–112 (OT)	Jalen Brunson (40)	Josh Hart (9)	Jalen Brunson (6)	Madison Square Garden; 19,812	3–2
6	May 2	@ Philadelphia	W 118–115	Jalen Brunson (41)	Josh Hart (14)	Jalen Brunson (12)	Wells Fargo Center; 21,093	4–2

Conference semifinals: 3–4 (home: 3–1; road: 0–3)

Game	Date	Team	Score	High points	High rebounds	High assists	Location Attendance	Series
1	May 6	Indiana	W 121–117	Jalen Brunson (43)	Josh Hart (13)	Josh Hart (8)	Madison Square Garden; 19,812	1–0
2	May 8	Indiana	W 130–121	Jalen Brunson (29)	Josh Hart (15)	Isaiah Hartenstein (8)	Madison Square Garden; 19,812	2–0
3	May 10	@ Indiana	L 106–111	Donte DiVincenzo (35)	Josh Hart (18)	Jalen Brunson (6)	Gainbridge Fieldhouse; 17,274	2–1
4	May 12	@ Indiana	L 89–121	Alec Burks (20)	Achiuwa, Sims (6)	Jalen Brunson (5)	Gainbridge Fieldhouse; 17,274	2–2
5	May 14	Indiana	W 121–91	Jalen Brunson (44)	Isaiah Hartenstein (17)	Jalen Brunson (7)	Madison Square Garden; 19,812	3–2
6	May 17	@ Indiana	L 103–116	Jalen Brunson (31)	Achiuwa, Hart (8)	Isaiah Hartenstein (6)	Gainbridge Fieldhouse; 17,274	3–3
7	May 19	Indiana	L 109–130	Donte DiVincenzo (39)	Isaiah Hartenstein (8)	Jalen Brunson (9)	Madison Square Garden; 19,812	3–4

2024 playoff schedule

=== In-Season Tournament ===
This was the first regular season where all the NBA teams competed in a mid-season tournament setting due to the implementation of the 2023 NBA In-Season Tournament. The Knicks competed in Group B of the Eastern Conference. They made the quarter-final, where they lost to the Bucks.

==== East group B ====
Pos	Team	Pld	W	L	PF	PA	PD	Qualification	MIL	NYK	MIA	CHA	WAS
1	Milwaukee Bucks	4	4	0	502	456	+46	Advance to knockout stage	—	110–105	131–124	130–99	131–128
2	New York Knicks	4	3	1	440	398	+42	Advance to knockout stage	105–110	—	100–98	115–91	120–99
3	Miami Heat	4	2	2	454	450	+4		124–131	98–100	—	111–105	121–114
4	Charlotte Hornets	4	1	3	419	473	−54		99–130	91–115	105–111	—	124–117
5	Washington Wizards	4	0	4	458	496	−38		128–131	99–120	114–121	117–124	—

Source: NBA
Rules for classification: Tiebreakers

== Player statistics ==
Legend
GP	Games played	GS	Games started	MPG	Minutes per game
FG%	Field-goal percentage	3P%	3-point field-goal percentage	FT%	Free-throw percentage
RPG	Rebounds per game	APG	Assists per game	SPG	Steals per game
BPG	Blocks per game	PPG	Points per game

=== Regular season ===
New York Knicks statistics
Player	GP	GS	MPG	FG%	3P%	FT%	RPG	APG	SPG	BPG	PPG
Precious Achiuwa^{†}	49	18	24.2	.525	.260	.643	7.2	1.1	.6	1.1	7.6
OG Anunoby^{†}	23	23	34.9	.488	.394	.791	4.4	1.5	1.7	1.0	14.1
Ryan Arcidiacono	20	0	2.3	.000	.000		.4	.2	.1	.0	.0
RJ Barrett^{†}	26	26	29.5	.423	.331	.831	4.3	2.4	.5	.3	18.2
Bojan Bogdanović^{†}	29	0	19.2	.430	.370	.800	2.0	.9	.2	.0	10.4
Charlie Brown Jr.	8	0	4.6	.200	.286		.3	.0	.0	.3	.8
Jalen Brunson	77	77	35.4	.479	.401	.847	3.6	6.7	.9	.2	28.7
Alec Burks^{†}	23	1	13.5	.307	.301	.727	1.7	.9	.3	.0	6.5
Mamadi Diakite^{†}	3	0	2.7	.000	.000		.3	.0	.3	.0	.0
Donte DiVincenzo	81	63	29.1	.443	.401	.754	3.7	2.7	1.3	.4	15.5
Malachi Flynn^{†}	14	0	4.3	.391	.308	.818	.4	.4	.1	.0	2.2
Evan Fournier^{†}	3	0	13.0	.200	.133	1.000	1.3	1.0	1.3	.0	4.0
Taj Gibson^{†}	16	1	10.3	.304	.000	1.000	1.8	.6	.1	.4	1.0
Quentin Grimes^{†}	45	18	20.2	.395	.363	.706	2.0	1.2	.7	.1	7.3
Josh Hart	81	42	33.4	.434	.310	.791	8.3	4.1	.9	.3	9.4
Isaiah Hartenstein	75	49	25.3	.644	.333	.707	8.3	2.5	1.2	1.1	7.8
DaQuan Jeffries	17	0	2.7	.353	.200	.000	.3	.3	.0	.1	.8
Miles McBride	68	14	19.5	.452	.410	.860	1.5	1.7	.7	.1	8.3
Shake Milton^{†}	6	0	4.5	.444	.500	1.000	1.0	.7	.2	.0	1.8
Immanuel Quickley^{†}	30	0	24.0	.454	.395	.872	2.6	2.5	.5	.1	15.0
Julius Randle	46	46	35.4	.472	.311	.781	9.2	5.0	.5	.3	24.0
Mitchell Robinson	31	21	24.8	.575		.409	8.5	.6	1.2	1.1	5.6
Jericho Sims	45	11	13.0	.691		.667	3.3	.6	.2	.4	2.0
Dmytro Skapintsev	2	0	1.0	.000			.0	.0	.0	.0	.0
Jacob Toppin	9	0	4.2	.556	.250	1.000	.8	.3	.0	.1	1.4
Dylan Windler^{†}	3	0	2.3	.500	.500		.3	.3	.0	.0	1.0

=== Playoffs ===
New York Knicks statistics
Player	GP	GS	MPG	FG%	3P%	FT%	RPG	APG	SPG	BPG	PPG
Precious Achiuwa	9	2	20.4	.488	.000	.385	4.2	.6	.4	1.3	5.2
OG Anunoby	9	9	36.0	.505	.410	.615	6.0	1.1	.9	1.0	15.1
Bojan Bogdanović	4	0	12.8	.292	.400	.571	3.0	1.0	.0	.3	6.0
Jalen Brunson	13	13	39.8	.444	.310	.775	3.3	7.5	.8	.2	32.4
Alec Burks	6	0	20.2	.500	.429	.844	3.3	1.0	.2	.2	14.8
Mamadi Diakite	4	0	3.8	.000	.000	1.000	.8	.3	.3	.3	.5
Donte DiVincenzo	13	13	35.8	.419	.425	.867	4.0	2.6	1.2	.9	17.8
Josh Hart	13	13	42.2	.440	.373	.729	11.5	4.5	1.0	.8	14.5
Isaiah Hartenstein	13	13	29.8	.592	.500	.864	7.8	3.5	.3	.9	8.5
DaQuan Jeffries	4	0	5.0	.375	.400		1.0	.0	.3	.0	2.0
Miles McBride	13	2	26.7	.435	.368	.833	2.2	1.9	.5	.2	11.0
Shake Milton	4	0	5.5	.000	.000	.833	.3	.5	.3	.0	1.3
Mitchell Robinson	6	0	19.2	.500		.375	6.8	.5	1.0	1.2	2.8
Jericho Sims	5	0	5.4	1.000		.750	1.6	.2	.4	.2	1.4

- ^{†} Denotes player spent time with another team in the season. Stats reflect time with the Knicks only.

== Transactions ==
=== Trades ===
July 7, 2023	To New York Knicks Two future second-round picks	To Indiana Pacers Obi Toppin
December 30, 2023	To New York Knicks Precious Achiuwa; O.G. Anunoby; Malachi Flynn	To Toronto Raptors RJ Barrett; Immanuel Quickley; 2024 second-round pick (via Detroit)
February 8, 2024	To New York Knicks Bojan Bogdanović; Alec Burks	To Detroit Pistons Ryan Arcidiacono; Malachi Flynn; Evan Fournier; Quentin Grimes; Two future second-round picks Cash considerations

=== Free agency ===
==== Re-signed ====
Player	Signed	Ref.
Duane Washington Jr.	January 3	

==== Additions ====
Player	Former Team	Ref.
Jaylen Martin	YNG Dreamerz	
Jacob Toppin	Kentucky	
Donte DiVincenzo	Golden State Warriors	
Charlie Brown Jr.	Delaware Blue Coats	
Ryan Arcidiacono	Portland Trail Blazers	
Taj Gibson	Washington Wizards	
Dmytro Skapintsev	Westchester Knicks	

==== Subtractions ====
Player	Reason	New Team	Ref.
Derrick Rose	Free agent	Memphis Grizzlies	
Jaylen Martin	Waived	Westchester Knicks	
DaQuan Jeffries	Waived	Westchester Knicks	
Dmytro Skapintsev	Waived	Westchester Knicks	
