= Shake Milton =

American basketball player (born 1996)

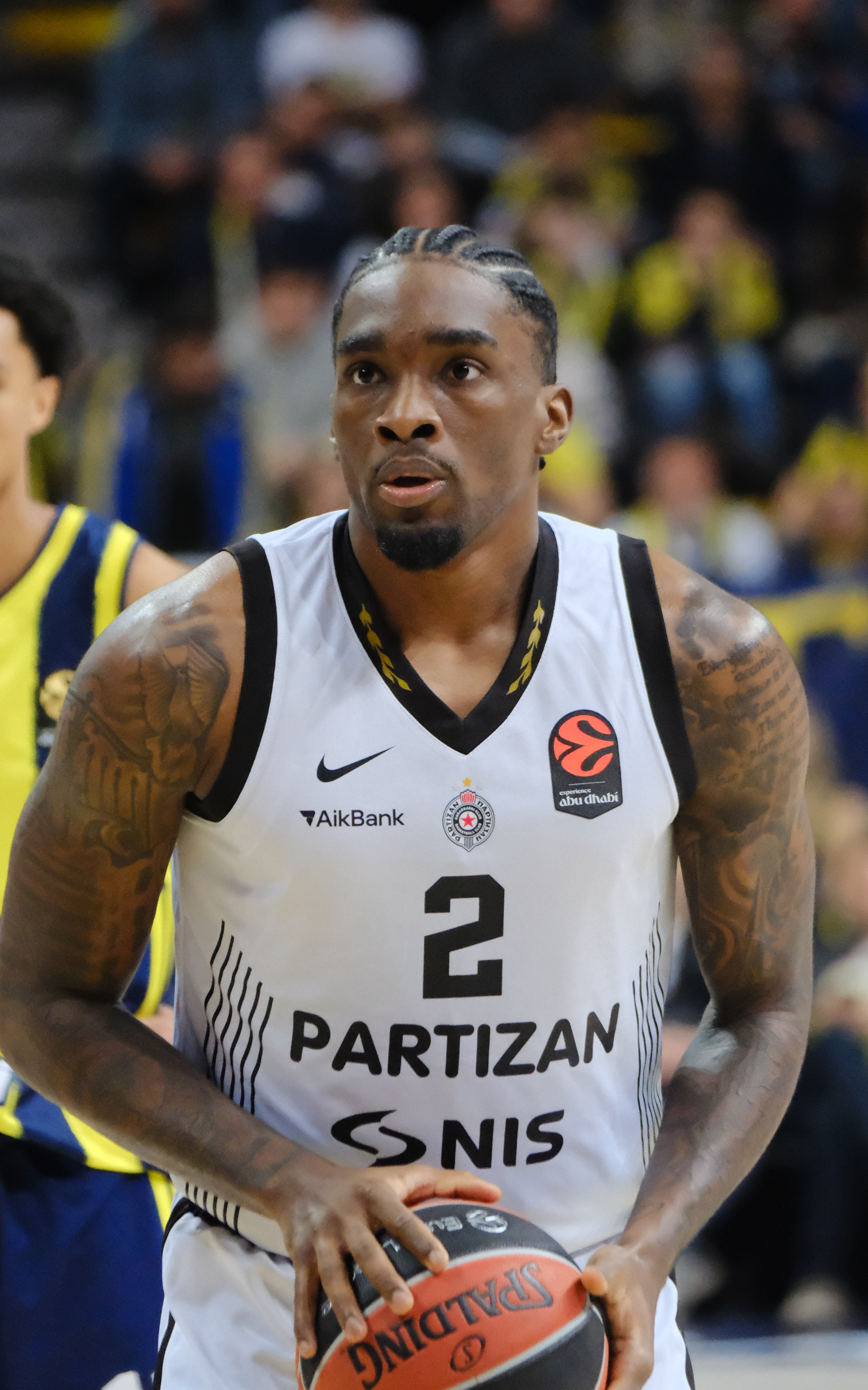
- Milton with Partizan in 2026

No. 9 – Hapoel Jerusalem
- Position: Shooting guard / point guard
- League: Israeli Basketball Premier League; EuroCup

Personal information
- Born: September 26, 1996 (age 30) Owasso, Oklahoma, U.S.
- Listed height: 6 ft 5 in (1.96 m)
- Listed weight: 205 lb (93 kg)

Career information
- High school: Owasso (Owasso, Oklahoma)
- College: SMU (2015–2018)
- NBA draft: 2018: 2nd round, 54th overall pick
- Drafted by: Dallas Mavericks
- Playing career: 2018–present

Career history
- 2018–2023: Philadelphia 76ers
- 2018–2019: →Delaware Blue Coats
- 2023–2024: Minnesota Timberwolves
- 2024: Detroit Pistons
- 2024: New York Knicks
- 2024: Brooklyn Nets
- 2024–2025: Los Angeles Lakers
- 2025–2026: Partizan Belgrade
- 2026–present: Hapoel Jerusalem

Career highlights
- 2× Second-team All-AAC (2017, 2018); AAC All-Rookie team (2016); First-team Parade All-American (2015); 2× Gatorade Oklahoma Player of the Year (2014, 2015)
- Stats at NBA.com
- Stats at Basketball Reference

Malik Benjamin "Shake" Milton (born September 26, 1996) is an American professional basketball player for Hapoel Jerusalem of the Israeli Basketball Premier League and the EuroCup. He played college basketball for Southern Methodist University (SMU) from 2015 to 2018. Milton was drafted 54th overall in the 2018 NBA draft by the NBA's Dallas Mavericks, and was then traded to the Philadelphia 76ers on draft night. He has also played for the Minnesota Timberwolves, Detroit Pistons, New York Knicks, Brooklyn Nets, Los Angeles Lakers, and Partizan Belgrade.

== High school career ==
Milton played under coach Mark Vancuren at Owasso High School in Owasso, Oklahoma, earning Gatorade Player of the Year honors for the state of Oklahoma in the 2013–14, and 2014–15 seasons. As a junior, he averaged 28.0 points, 5.9 rebounds, and 3.9 assists per game. As a senior in 2014–15 he averaged 29.7 points and 4.4 assists per game on his way to being named Tulsa World Player of the Year, Oklahoma Super 5 Player of the Year, and Oklahoma Coaches Association All-State.

College recruiting
Name	Hometown	School	Height	Weight	Commit date
Shake Milton; PG / SG	Owasso, OK	Owasso High School (Owasso, OK)	6 ft 4 in (1.93 m)	190 lb (86 kg)	Oct 15, 2014
Shake Milton; PG / SG	Recruit ratings: Rivals: 247Sports: (84)				
Overall recruit ranking: Rivals: 66 247Sports: 92, 27 (SG) ESPN: 79, 13 (PG)
Note: In many cases, Scout, Rivals, 247Sports, On3, and ESPN may conflict in their listings of height and weight.; In these cases, the average was taken. ESPN grades are on a 100-point scale.; Sources: "2015 SMU Basketball Commitment List". Rivals.; "2015 SMU Basketball Commitment List". ESPN.; "2015 Team Ranking". Rivals.

== College career ==
He committed to Southern Methodist University (SMU) to play for the Mustangs in the American Athletic Conference (AAC), over the University of Oklahoma and Indiana University. In his freshman year at SMU, Milton saw the hardwood in 30 games (23 starts) to average 32.7 minutes, 10.5 points, 3.0 boards, and 2.7 assists a contest, while shooting 47.7% from the floor and 42.6% (7th in the AAC) from three-point range, earning unanimous AAC All-Rookie Team distinction.

In the summer of 2016, he was a member of the US Select Team for the Basketball Goodwill Tour in Croatia.

The 2016–17 sophomore season saw him start in all 35 games and produce averages of 35.4 minutes,13.0 points, 4.1 rebounds, 4.5 assists (4th in the AAC), and 1.3 steals (10th) per outing, while shooting 42.3% from three-point range (9th). He made the All-AAC Second Team, and the NABC District 25 All-District Second Team.

In his 2017–18 junior campaign, Milton started 22 games for the Mustangs, averaging 36.4 minutes, 18.0 points (3rd in the AAC), 4.7 rebounds, 4.4 assists (3rd), and 1.4 steals (10th) per game while shooting 43.4% from three-point range (5th) and 84.7% from the free throw line (2nd). A broken right hand ended his season. He was named to the All-AAC Second Team for a second season.

As of 2026, Milton ranked 4th all-time of SMU players in career three-point field goal percentage (.424), eighth in career three-point field goals made (134), and was tied for seventh in single-season three-point field goals made (with 82 during the 2016–17 season).

== Professional career ==
=== Philadelphia 76ers (2018–2023) ===
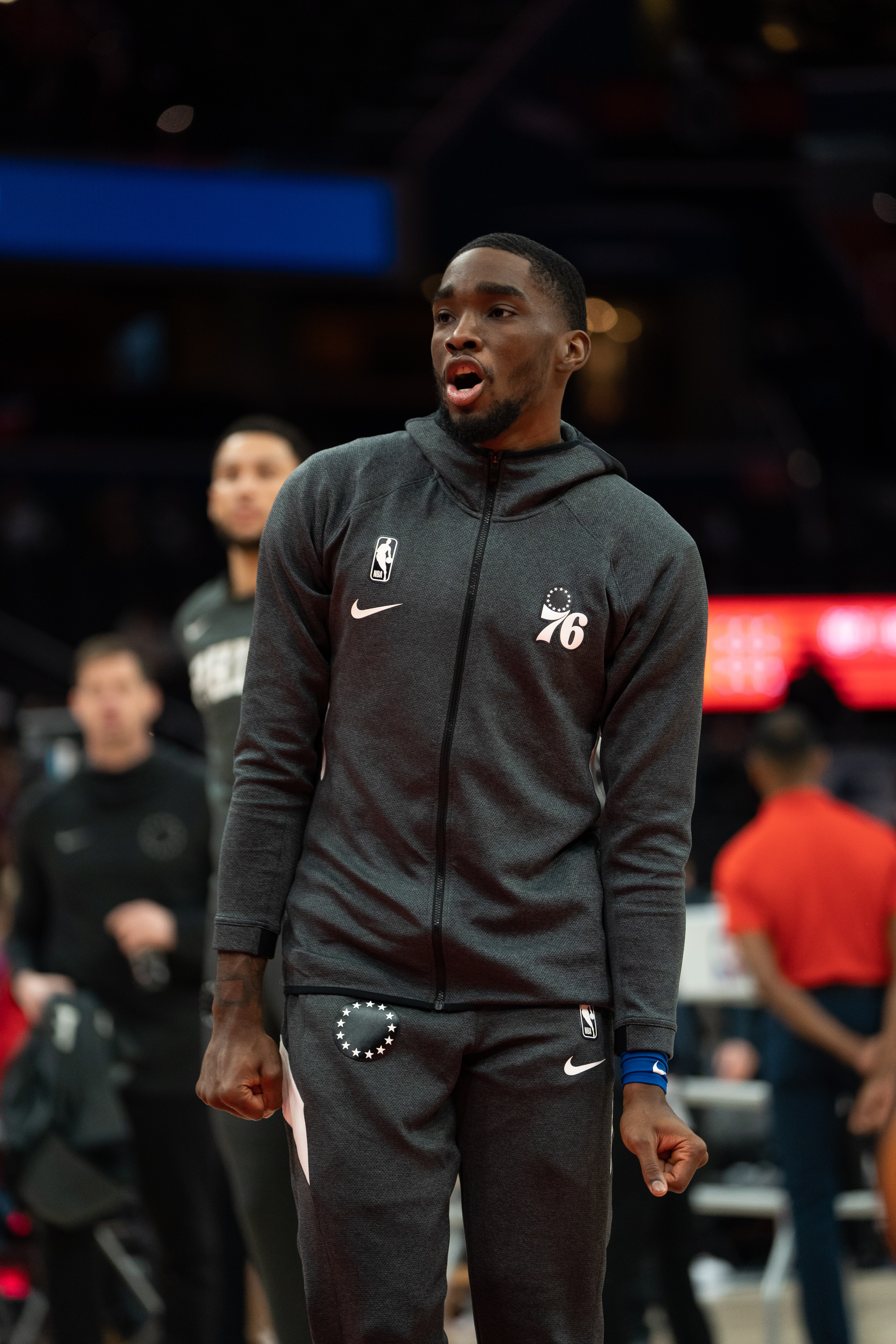
Milton with the Philadelphia 76ers in 2019

Milton was selected by the Dallas Mavericks in the second round (54th pick overall) in the 2018 NBA draft. He was subsequently traded to the Philadelphia 76ers for the rights to the 56th and 60th picks, Ray Spalding and Kostas Antetokounmpo, respectively. On July 26, Milton signed a two-way contract with Philadelphia, which would split his playing time between the 76ers and their NBA G League affiliate, the Delaware Blue Coats.

Milton made his NBA debut on November 30, 2018, against the Washington Wizards, scoring five points and recording two assists. As a rookie, Milton appeared in 20 games off the bench for the Sixers, averaging 4.4 points, 1.8 rebounds, and 0.9 assists in 13.4 minutes per game. Milton scored a career-high 13 points against the Orlando Magic on March 25, 2019. Milton also averaged 34.7 minutes, 24.9 points (4th-best in the G-League), 5.2 assists, 4.8 rebounds, and 1.3 steals per game in 27 starts for the Blue Coats, shooting 48.4% from the field and 80.4% from the free throw line.

Before the start of the 2019–20 season, Milton signed a four-year deal with Philadelphia. Milton was injured early in the season and missed time. After returning to the 76ers, Milton made his first career start January 25, 2020, against the Los Angeles Lakers, with seven points, three assists, and a career-high nine rebounds. Later that month, in his third career start, he set new career highs in assists with 6 and points with 27, surpassing his previous career high of 13 in the first half, in a loss to the Atlanta Hawks. On March 1, 2020, Milton scored a career-high 39 points in a 136–130 loss to the Los Angeles Clippers and tied an NBA record for most consecutive made three-pointers (13) over a span of three games. He played six games for the Blue Coats, averaging 24.5 minutes, 21.0 points, 4.8 rebounds, and 3.0 assists per game, while shooting 46.3% from the floor and 45.5% from three-point range. Milton would go on to start 24 games and play in 40 games total that season for the 76ers, posting career highs in multiple different statistical categories. He averaged 20.1 minutes, 9.4 points, 2.2 rebounds, and 2.6 assists per game, while shooting 48.4% from the floor and 43.0% from three-point range.

Milton made 63 appearances (including four starts) for Philadelphia during the 2020–21 NBA season, averaging a career–high 23.2 minutes, 13.0 points, 2.3 rebounds, and 3.1 assists per game, while shooting 45.0% from the floor and 83.0% from three-point range.

He played in 55 games (starting six) for the 76ers in the 2021–22 campaign, recording averages of 21.4 minutes, 8.2 points, 2.6 rebounds, and 2.5 assists, shooting 83.6% from the free throw line.

Milton made 76 appearances (11 starts) for Philadelphia in his last year with the team during the 2022–23 NBA season, logging averages of 20.6 minutes, 8.4 points, 2.5 rebounds, and 3.2 assists per game, while shooting 47.9% from the floor and 85.3% from the free throw line.

=== Minnesota Timberwolves (2023–2024) ===
On July 9, 2023, Milton signed with the Minnesota Timberwolves. On December 8, Milton recorded 17 points, one assist, and two rebounds off the bench in a 127–103 victory against the Memphis Grizzlies. He made 38 appearances for the Timberwolves in the 2023–24 season, averaging 12.9 minutes, 4.7 points, 1.3 rebounds, and 1.3 assists, while shooting 81.3% from the free throw line.

=== Detroit Pistons (2024) ===
On February 7, 2024, Milton was traded to the Detroit Pistons alongside Troy Brown Jr. and a 2030 second-round pick, in exchange for Monté Morris. On February 14, Milton scored 13 points along with two assists and nine rebounds off the bench in a 116–100 loss against the Phoenix Suns. He made four appearances for Detroit, recording averages of 15.8 minutes, 6.8 points, 4.5 rebounds, and 1.5 assists. On March 1, Milton agreed to a buy-out with the Pistons.

=== New York Knicks (2024) ===
On March 5, 2024, Milton signed with the New York Knicks. Milton made six appearances for the Knicks during the remainder of the regular season, averaging 4.6 minutes, 1.8 points, 1.0 rebounds, and 0.7 assists per game.

=== Brooklyn Nets (2024) ===
On July 6, 2024, Milton was signed and traded to the Brooklyn Nets alongside Bojan Bogdanović, Mamadi Diakite, four unprotected first-round picks, a top-four protected first round pick, an unprotected pick swap and a second-round pick in exchange for Mikal Bridges, Keita Bates-Diop and a second–round pick. On November 29, Milton recorded 22 points, two rebounds, four assists and one steal off the bench in a 123-100 loss against the Orlando Magic. On December 26, Milton had 20 points - 14 of those in just five minutes - two rebounds, and one steal off the bench in a 111–105 win against the Milwaukee Bucks. The next day on December 27, Milton made his first start of the season and his only start as a member of the Nets and had a double-double with 16 points, 10 assists, three rebounds, and one steal during a 96–87 loss against the San Antonio Spurs which ended up being his final game as a member of the Nets. In 27 games for Brooklyn, Milton had averaged 18.2 minutes, 7.4 points, 1.9 rebounds, and 2.4 assists per game, while shooting 46.5% from the floor.

=== Los Angeles Lakers (2024–2025) ===
On December 29, 2024, Milton and Dorian Finney-Smith were traded to the Los Angeles Lakers in exchange for Maxwell Lewis, D'Angelo Russell and three future second-round draft picks. On January 30, 2025, Milton would have his highest scoring game with the Lakers recording 21 points (7/8 FG and 6-6 FT), four assists, and four rebounds in 28 minutes of action while coming off the bench in a 134–96 victory against the Washington Wizards. Milton made 30 appearances (including one start) for Los Angeles, posting averages of 11.5 minutes, 3.9 points, 1.8 rebounds, and 1.3 assists, while shooting 84.6% from the free throw line. On July 20, Milton was waived by the Lakers.

=== Partizan Belgrade (2025–2026) ===
On July 24, 2025, Milton signed a two-year contract with Partizan Mozzart Bet of the Basketball League of Serbia (KLS), ABA League, and the EuroLeague. On July 9, 2026, Milton parted ways with Partizan. In 2025-26 with the team, in 39 games he averaged 19.1 minutes, 8.8 points, 1.9 rebounds, and 2.7 assists, while shooting 49.2% from the floor and 86.4% from the free throw line.

=== Hapoel Jerusalem (2026–present) ===
On July 31, 2026, Milton signed with Hapoel Jerusalem of the Israeli Basketball Premier League and the EuroCup.

== Career statistics ==
Legend
GP	Games played	GS	Games started	MPG	Minutes per game
FG%	Field goal percentage	3P%	3-point field goal percentage	FT%	Free throw percentage
RPG	Rebounds per game	APG	Assists per game	SPG	Steals per game
BPG	Blocks per game	PPG	Points per game	**Bold**	Career high

=== NBA ===
==== Regular season ====
Year	Team	GP	GS	MPG	FG%	3P%	FT%	RPG	APG	SPG	BPG	PPG
2018–19	Philadelphia	20	0	13.4	.391	.318	.714	1.8	.9	.4	**.4**	4.4
2019–20	Philadelphia	40	**24**	20.1	**.484**	.430	.785	2.2	2.6	.5	.2	9.4
2020–21	Philadelphia	63	4	**23.2**	.450	.350	.830	2.3	3.1	**.6**	.3	**13.0**
2021–22	Philadelphia	55	6	21.4	.429	.323	.836	2.6	2.5	.5	.3	8.2
2022–23	Philadelphia	**76**	11	20.6	.479	.378	.853	2.5	**3.2**	.3	.2	8.4
2023–24	Minnesota	38	0	12.9	.400	.264	.818	1.3	1.3	.4	.1	4.7
2023–24	Detroit	4	0	15.8	.423	.333	.667	**4.5**	1.5	.5	.3	6.8
2023–24	New York	6	0	4.6	.444	**.500**	**1.000**	1.0	.7	.2	.0	1.8
2024–25	Brooklyn	27	1	18.2	.465	.389	.758	1.9	2.4	**.6**	.0	7.4
2024–25	L.A. Lakers	30	1	11.5	.433	.294	.846	1.8	1.3	.3	.1	3.9
Career		359	47	18.7	.451	.358	.824	2.2	2.4	.5	.2	8.1

==== Playoffs ====
Year	Team	GP	GS	MPG	FG%	3P%	FT%	RPG	APG	SPG	BPG	PPG
2020	Philadelphia	4	**4**	**31.5**	.477	.400	.857	**3.3**	**2.8**	**.5**	.0	**14.5**
2021	Philadelphia	**12**	0	10.1	.319	.421	.933	.8	.8	.3	.1	4.3
2022	Philadelphia	**12**	0	13.2	.474	**.533**	.800	1.6	.9	**.5**	**.3**	5.0
2023	Philadelphia	6	0	3.5	**.600**	.000	**1.000**	.5	.3	.3	.0	1.3
2024	New York	4	0	5.5	.000	.000	.833	.3	.5	.3	.0	1.3
2025	L.A. Lakers	4	0	2.0	.000	—	—	.0	.0	.0	.0	.0
Career		40	4	11.3	.404	.419	.860	1.1	.9	.4	.1	4.6

=== EuroLeague ===
Year	Team	GP	GS	MPG	FG%	3P%	FT%	RPG	APG	SPG	BPG	PPG	PIR
2025–26	Partizan	23	10	18:35	.495	.257	.846	1.4	2.4	.5	.1	6.9	5.9

=== Domestic leagues ===
Year	Team	League	GP	MPG	FG%	3P%	FT%	RPG	APG	SPG	BPG	PPG
2018–19	(United States) Delaware Blue Coats	NBA G League	27	34.7	.484	.367	.804	4.8	5.3	1.3	.5	24.9
2019–20	(United States) Delaware Blue Coats	NBA G League	6	24.5	.463	.455	.778	5.0	3.3	.7	.0	21.0
2025–26	(Serbia) Partizan	KLS	2	25.9	.316	.429	.1000	7.5	6.0	1.5	.0	9.5
2025–26	(Serbia) Partizan	ABA	14	18.8	.615	.469	.867	2.1	2.8	1.1	.1	11.9

=== College ===
Year	Team	GP	GS	MPG	FG%	3P%	FT%	RPG	APG	SPG	BPG	PPG
2015–16	SMU	30	23	32.7	**.477**	.426	.725	3.0	2.7	.8	.3	10.5
2016–17	SMU	**35**	**35**	35.4	.437	.423	.758	4.1	**4.5**	1.3	.3	13.0
2017–18	SMU	22	22	**36.4**	.449	**.434**	**.847**	**4.7**	4.4	**1.4**	**.6**	**18.0**
Career		87	80	34.7	.452	.427	.791	3.9	3.9	1.1	.4	13.4

== Personal life ==
Milton is the son of Myrion Milton who played college basketball for the Oklahoma Wesleyan Eagles and Texas A&M Aggies. His nickname, "Shake", is derived from his father's nickname of "Milk". He is also nicknamed "Sniper Shake". Milton was a freshman at Owasso High School when his father died.
