= DaQuan Jeffries =

American basketball player (born 1997)

- DaQuan Jeffries with Beşiktaş

No. 2 – Beşiktaş Fuzul
- Position: Small forward / shooting guard
- League: BSL; EuroLeague

Personal information
- Born: August 30, 1997 (age 29) Edmond, Oklahoma, U.S.
- Listed height: 6 ft 5 in (1.96 m)
- Listed weight: 222 lb (101 kg)

Career information
- High school: Edmond Santa Fe (Edmond, Oklahoma)
- College: Oral Roberts (2015–2016); Western Texas (2016–2017); Tulsa (2017–2019)
- NBA draft: 2019: undrafted
- Playing career: 2019–present

Career history
- 2019–2020: Sacramento Kings
- 2019–2020: →Stockton Kings
- 2021: Houston Rockets
- 2021: College Park Skyhawks
- 2022: Memphis Grizzlies
- 2022: College Park Skyhawks
- 2022–2023: Westchester Knicks
- 2023–2024: New York Knicks
- 2024: →Westchester Knicks
- 2024–2025: Charlotte Hornets
- 2025–2026: Stockton Kings
- 2026: Sacramento Kings
- 2026–present: Beşiktaş

Career highlights
- All-NBA G League First Team (2026); Third-team All-AAC (2019)
- Stats at NBA.com
- Stats at Basketball Reference

DaQuan Marquel Jeffries (born August 30, 1997) is an American professional basketball player for Beşiktaş of the Turkish Basketbol Süper Ligi. He played college basketball for the Oral Roberts Golden Eagles, Western Texas Westerners, and Tulsa Golden Hurricane.

== College career ==
Jeffries played at Oral Roberts and Western Texas College before transferring to Tulsa, where he played two seasons of college basketball. As a senior, he averaged 13 points and 5.6 rebounds per game and was named to the Third-team All-American Athletic Conference. After the season, Jeffries took part in the Portsmouth Invitational Tournament.

== Professional career ==
Originally projected as a second-round pick, Jeffries went undrafted in the 2019 NBA draft. He signed with the Orlando Magic on June 21, 2019. Reportedly, he declined a two-way deal in order to compete for a roster spot with the team. On October 19, 2019, the Magic released Jeffries.

=== Sacramento Kings (2019–2021) ===
Jeffries then signed a two-way contract with the Sacramento Kings on October 21, 2019. Under the terms of the deal he will split time between the Kings and their NBA G League affiliate, the Stockton Kings. On December 13, Jeffries tallied 44 points, nine rebounds and two blocks for Stockton in a victory over the Sioux Falls Skyforce. He suffered an undisclosed injury later in December.

On November 28, 2020, Jeffries was signed to a standard contract by the Kings. On April 3, 2021, Jeffries was waived by the Kings. He appeared in 31 games in two seasons.

=== Houston Rockets (2021) ===
On April 5, 2021, the Houston Rockets claimed Jeffries off waivers. On May 13, he was waived by the Rockets after 13 appearances.

=== College Park Skyhawks (2021–2022) ===
On May 15, 2021, the San Antonio Spurs claimed Jeffries off waivers.

On October 7, 2021, the Atlanta Hawks signed Jeffries. However, he was waived on October 15. In October 2021, Jeffries signed with the College Park Skyhawks. He averaged 15.4 points and 2.4 rebounds per game.

=== Memphis Grizzlies (2022) ===
On January 1, 2022, Jeffries signed a 10-day contract with the Memphis Grizzlies via the hardship exemption. He appeared in three games during this stint, scoring 2 total points. On January 11, 2022, Jeffries was reacquired by the College Park Skyhawks.

=== New York / Westchester Knicks (2022–2024) ===
On September 15, 2022, Jeffries signed with the New York Knicks, but was waived at the end of training camp. On October 24, he joined the Westchester Knicks.

On November 29, 2022, Jeffries signed a two-way contract with the New York Knicks after playing well for their NBA G League team, the Westchester Knicks. On March 5, 2023, the Knicks converted Jeffries' deal to a 10-day contract, then signed him to a second 10-day contract on March 16 and on March 26, they signed him to a standard deal. On December 30, 2023, Jeffries was waived by the New York Knicks.

On January 2, 2024, Jeffries re-joined the Westchester Knicks and on February 22, he was signed to a 10-day contract. On March 3, he returned to Westchester and on March 14, he rejoined New York on another 10-day contract. On March 25, he signed with New York for the rest of the season.

=== Charlotte Hornets (2024–2025) ===
On October 2, 2024, Jeffries was signed and traded to the Charlotte Hornets in a three team trade involving the Minnesota Timberwolves in which Minnesota acquired Keita Bates-Diop, Donte DiVincenzo, Julius Randle, and one Lottery Protected first-round pick. The Hornets also received Charlie Brown Jr., Duane Washington Jr., three second-round picks and draft compensation. New York acquired Karl-Anthony Towns and the draft rights to James Nnaji. He made 47 appearances (20 starts) for Charlotte during the 2024–25 NBA season, averaging a career-high 6.7 points, 2.9 rebounds, and 1.1 assists. On September 18, 2025, Jeffries was waived by the Hornets.

=== Sacramento / Stockton Kings (2025–2026) ===
On October 15, 2025, Jeffries signed a training camp contract with the Sacramento Kings. That same day, his rights were traded from the Westchester Knicks to the Stockton Kings in exchange for the rights to Terry Thomas and Jalen Thomas, as well as Stockton's 2026 first-round pick. Jeffries was waived by Sacramento the following day, with expectations that he would join Stockton.

On March 26, 2026, Sacramento signed Jeffries to a 10-day contract after the team suffered multiple injuries. He played in three games for Sacramento, recording averages of 10.3 points, 1.7 rebounds, and 0.3 assists.

=== Beşiktaş (2026–present) ===
On July 11, 2026, Jeffries signed with Beşiktaş of the Turkish Basketbol Süper Ligi (BSL).

== Career statistics ==
Legend
GP	Games played	GS	Games started	MPG	Minutes per game
FG%	Field goal percentage	3P%	3-point field goal percentage	FT%	Free throw percentage
RPG	Rebounds per game	APG	Assists per game	SPG	Steals per game
BPG	Blocks per game	PPG	Points per game	**Bold**	Career high

=== NBA ===
==== Regular season ====
Year	Team	GP	GS	MPG	FG%	3P%	FT%	RPG	APG	SPG	BPG	PPG
2019–20	Sacramento	13	0	10.9	.500	.278	.833	1.4	.5	.3	.1	3.8
2020–21	Sacramento	18	2	12.9	.421	.321	.857	1.6	.3	.4	.2	3.5
2020–21	Houston	13	3	20.1	.413	.282	**1.000**	**3.2**	**1.2**	.6	**.5**	4.9
2021–22	Memphis	3	0	2.9	.500	.000	—	.7	.3	.0	.0	.7
2023–24	New York	17	0	2.7	.353	.200	.000	.3	.3	.0	.1	.8
2024–25	Charlotte	**47**	**20**	**22.8**	.405	.335	.800	2.9	1.1	.6	**.5**	6.7
2025–26	Sacramento	3	0	20.0	**.579**	**.444**	**1.000**	1.7	.3	**.7**	.0	**10.3**
Career		114	25	16.0	.421	.320	.804	2.1	.8	.4	.3	4.7

==== Playoffs ====
Year	Team	GP	GS	MPG	FG%	3P%	FT%	RPG	APG	SPG	BPG	PPG
2023	New York	2	0	2.3	—	—	—	.0	.0	.0	.0	.0
2024	New York	**4**	0	**5.0**	.375	.400	—	**1.0**	.0	**.3**	.0	**2.0**
Career		6	0	4.1	.375	.400	—	.7	.0	.2	.0	1.3

=== College ===
==== NCAA Division I ====
Year	Team	GP	GS	MPG	FG%	3P%	FT%	RPG	APG	SPG	BPG	PPG
2015–16	Oral Roberts	29	7	20.3	**.574**	**.393**	.783	4.4	.8	.6	.6	6.7
2017–18	Tulsa	25	9	22.0	.542	**.393**	**.792**	4.9	.8	.6	**1.4**	9.7
2018–19	Tulsa	**31**	**31**	**28.1**	.502	.366	.755	**5.6**	**1.8**	**1.0**	1.2	**13.0**
Career		85	47	23.6	.530	.377	.770	5.0	1.2	.8	1.1	9.9

==== JUCO ====
Year	Team	GP	GS	MPG	FG%	3P%	FT%	RPG	APG	SPG	BPG	PPG
2016–17	Western Texas	30	30	20.8	.653	.294	.772	7.6	1.7	1.1	.8	15.2
