= Charlie Brown Jr. (basketball) =

American basketball player (born 1997)

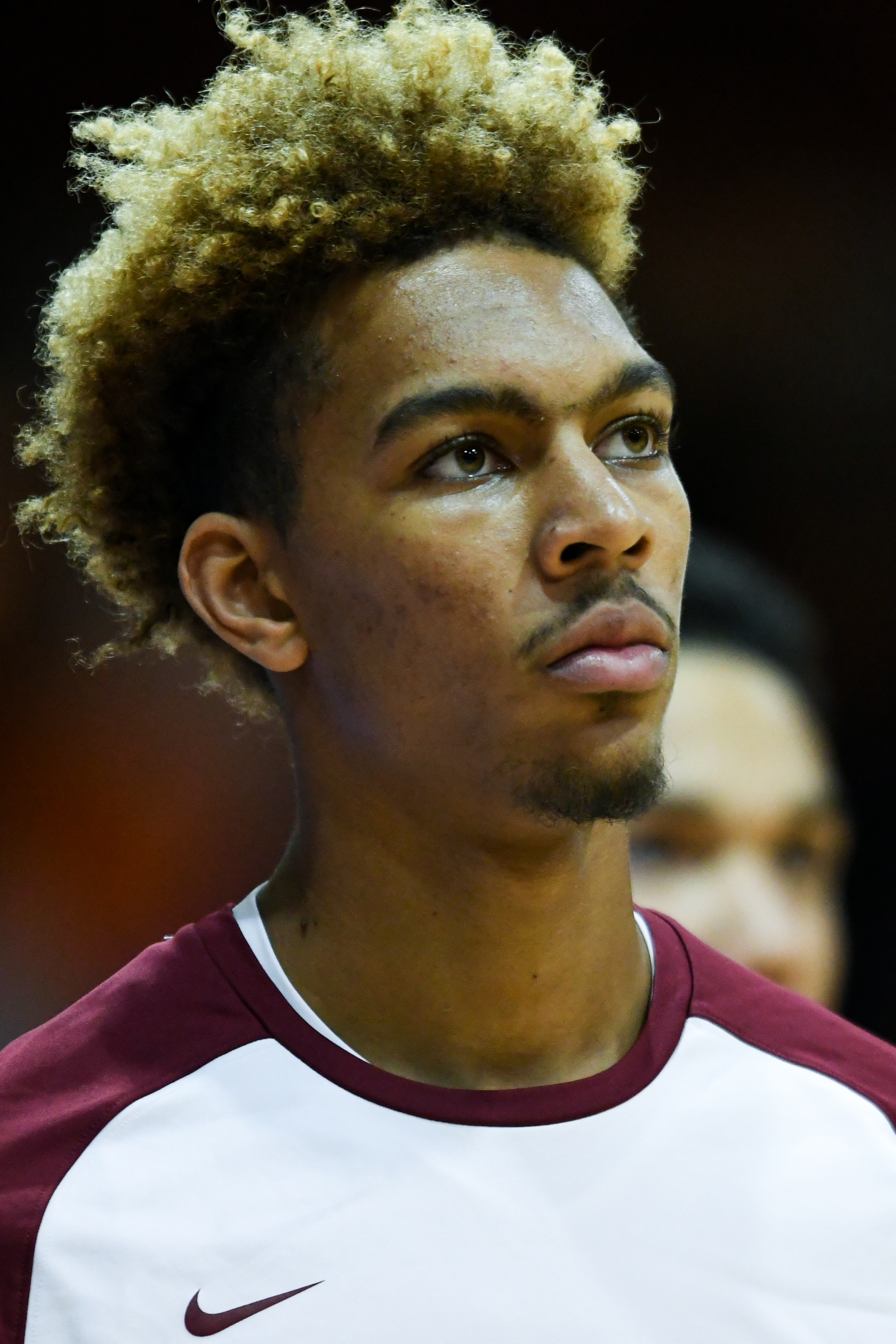
- Brown with Saint Joseph's in 2016

No. 4 – Dolomiti Energia Trento
- Position: Shooting guard
- League: LBA; EuroCup

Personal information
- Born: February 2, 1997 (age 29) Philadelphia, Pennsylvania, U.S.
- Listed height: 6 ft 6 in (1.98 m)
- Listed weight: 199 lb (90 kg)

Career information
- High school: Imhotep Institute Charter (Philadelphia, Pennsylvania); George Washington (Philadelphia, Pennsylvania); St. Thomas More (Oakdale, Connecticut)
- College: Saint Joseph's (2016–2019)
- NBA draft: 2019: undrafted
- Playing career: 2019–present

Career history
- 2019–2020: Atlanta Hawks
- 2019–2020: →College Park Skyhawks
- 2021: Iowa Wolves
- 2021: Oklahoma City Thunder
- 2021: Delaware Blue Coats
- 2021–2022: Dallas Mavericks
- 2022: Philadelphia 76ers
- 2022: →Delaware Blue Coats
- 2022–2023: Delaware Blue Coats
- 2023–2024: New York Knicks
- 2023–2024: →Westchester Knicks
- 2024: NBA G League United
- 2024–2025: Raptors 905
- 2025–2026: Memphis Hustle
- 2026–present: Aquila Basket Trento

Career highlights
- NBA G League champion (2023); Second-team All-Atlantic 10 (2019); FIBA 3x3 AmeriCup MVP (2021)
- Stats at NBA.com
- Stats at Basketball Reference
Medals
Men's 3x3 basketball
Representing the United States
FIBA 3x3 AmeriCup
| Gold medal – first place | 2021 Miami | Team |

Charles Brown Jr. (born February 2, 1997) is an American professional basketball player for Aquila Basket Trento of the Italian Lega Basket Serie A (LBA) and the EuroCup. He played college basketball for the Saint Joseph's Hawks.

== Early life and high school ==
Brown was born in Philadelphia, Pennsylvania and grew up in the northeast section of the city. He initially attended Imhotep Institute Charter High School before transferring to George Washington High School before his junior year. Before his senior year he played for Philly Pride in the Amateur Athletic Union. As a senior, Brown averaged 18.4 points per game and was named the MVP Philadelphia Public League's B Division. He verbally committed to West Chester University but was offered and accepted a scholarship to Saint Joseph's University. Brown opted to prep for a fifth year at the St. Thomas More School in Oakdale, Connecticut, where he helped the team to a 31–6 record and the National Prep Championship game.

== College career ==
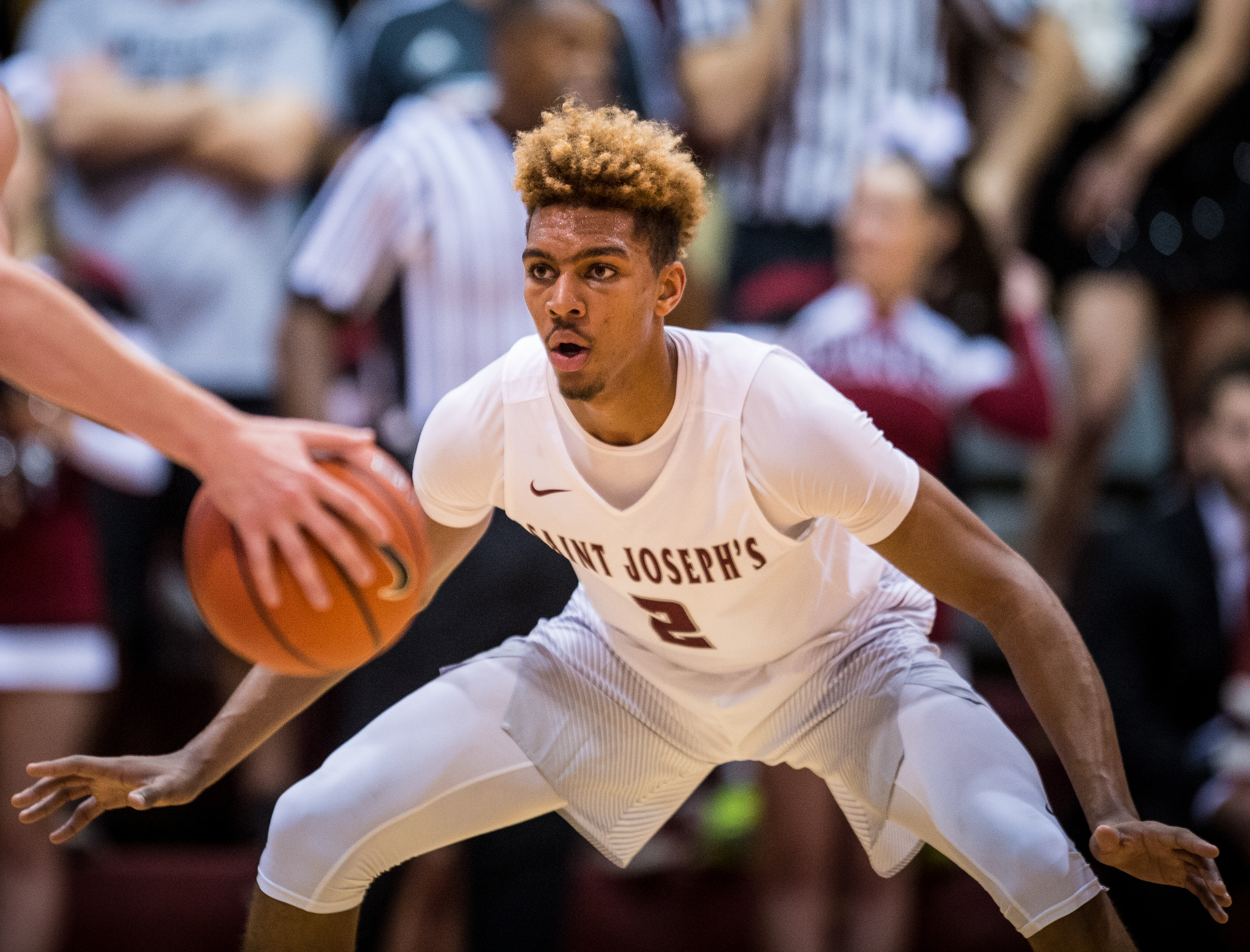
Brown with Saint Joseph's in November 2016

As a freshman at Saint Joseph's, he started 30 of the Hawks' 31 games and averaged 12.8 points, five rebounds, and 1.1 assists while shooting 38.4 percent from behind the arc and 81.9 percent from the free-throw line. Brown was named to the Atlantic 10 Conference All-Rookie team. He was named third team all conference entering his true sophomore season, but missed the entirety of the year after being forced to use a medical redshirt after breaking his wrist in preseason practice.

As a redshirt sophomore, Brown led the Atlantic 10 with 19.0 points per game and averaged 6.2 rebounds and 1.5 assists over 32 games earning him second team All-Atlantic 10 and first team All-Big 5 honors. In total, Brown scored 1,006 points and grabbed 352 rebounds in 63 games during his college career. Following the end of the redshirt sophomore season, Brown declared for the 2019 NBA draft with the intent on signing an agent, therefore forgoing his final two seasons of eligibility.

== Professional career ==
=== Atlanta Hawks (2019–2020) ===
After going unselected in the draft, Brown agreed to a two-way contract with the Atlanta Hawks on June 21, 2019, and officially signed on July 1, 2019. Brown made his NBA debut on November 6, 2019, against the Chicago Bulls, playing four minutes with two points and a rebound in a 113–93 loss.

=== Iowa Wolves (2021) ===
On December 11, 2020, Brown was signed by the Minnesota Timberwolves, but was waived eight days later. On January 25, 2021, he signed with the Iowa Wolves of the NBA G League where he appeared in 13 games and averaged 12.5 points, 5.5 rebounds, 1.9 assists and a team-high 1.69 steals in 30.0 minutes while shooting 44.7 percent from the field.

=== Oklahoma City Thunder (2021) ===
On April 25, 2021, Brown signed a 10-day contract with the Oklahoma City Thunder. On May 5, he signed a second 10-day contract and 10 days later, he signed a multi-year contract.

On September 26, 2021, Brown was waived by the Thunder.

=== Delaware Blue Coats (2021) ===
On October 20, 2021, Brown's rights were traded from the Iowa Wolves to Delaware Blue Coats in exchange for Raphiael Putney, and five days later, he signed with the Blue Coats. In 11 games, he averaged 16.8 points, 8.1 rebounds, 1.6 assists, 1.6 steals, and 0.9 blocks.

=== Dallas Mavericks (2021–2022) ===
On December 23, 2021, Brown signed a 10-day contract with the Dallas Mavericks. He appeared in three games for the Mavericks.

=== Philadelphia 76ers (2022) ===
On January 2, 2022, Brown was reacquired and activated by the Delaware Blue Coats. The following day, Brown signed a 10-day contract with the Philadelphia 76ers. On January 11, he signed a two-way contract with the 76ers. On January 19, 2022, Brown made his first NBA start at home for the 76ers against the Orlando Magic of Orlando, FL.

=== Return to Delaware (2022–2023) ===
On November 3, 2022, Brown was named to the opening night roster for the Delaware Blue Coats and eventually helped the team win the NBA G League title.

=== New York Knicks (2023–2024) ===
In July 2023, Brown joined the New York Knicks for the 2023 NBA Summer League and on September 8, he signed an Exhibit 10 contract with them. On October 21, the Knicks converted his deal into a two-way contract.

On October 2, 2024, Brown was signed and traded to the Charlotte Hornets in a three team trade involving the Minnesota Timberwolves in which Minnesota acquired Keita Bates-Diop, Donte DiVincenzo, Julius Randle, and one Lottery Protected first-round pick. The Hornets also received DaQuan Jeffries, Duane Washington Jr., three second-round picks and draft compensation. New York acquired Karl-Anthony Towns and the draft rights to James Nnaji. However, on October 18, he was waived by the Hornets.

=== Raptors 905 (2024–2025) ===
On October 28, 2024, Brown joined the Raptors 905. On November 19, he tied the G-League record for most steals in a game by recording 9 steals in a 109–119 loss against the Capital City Go-Go. This record was broken 20 days later by Isaac Nogués of the Rip City Remix who set the new record by recording 10 in a game against the Santa Cruz Warriors.

=== Memphis Hustle (2025–2026) ===
On September 25, 2025, Brown was traded to the Memphis Hustle in exchange for a 2026 first-round pick and a 2026 second-round pick.

=== Aquila Basket Trento (2026–present) ===
On July 20, 2026, he signed with Aquila Basket Trento of the Italian Lega Basket Serie A (LBA).

== Personal life ==
Brown's father, Charlie Brown Sr., played college basketball at North Carolina A&T for two years and then professionally overseas until he suffered a career-ending Achilles tendon rupture.

== Career statistics ==
Legend
| GP | Games played | GS | Games started | MPG | Minutes per game |
| FG% | Field goal percentage | 3P% | 3-point field goal percentage | FT% | Free throw percentage |
| RPG | Rebounds per game | APG | Assists per game | SPG | Steals per game |
| BPG | Blocks per game | PPG | Points per game | **Bold** | Career high |

=== NBA ===
==== Regular season ====
| Year | Team | GP | GS | MPG | FG% | 3P% | FT% | RPG | APG | SPG | BPG | PPG |
|---|---|---|---|---|---|---|---|---|---|---|---|---|
| 2019–20 | Atlanta | 10 | 0 | 4.0 | **.316** | **.333** | **1.000** | .4 | .2 | .2 | .2 | 2.0 |
| 2020–21 | Oklahoma City | 9 | 1 | **16.9** | .302 | .238 | .900 | **1.9** | **1.0** | .4 | .2 | **4.4** |
| 2021–22 | Dallas | 3 | 0 | 5.1 | .200 | .000 | — | .3 | .3 | **.7** | **.3** | .7 |
| 2021–22 | Philadelphia | **19** | **2** | 8.5 | .265 | .111 | .900 | 1.6 | .3 | .4 | .2 | 1.5 |
| 2023–24 | New York | 8 | 0 | 4.7 | .200 | .286 | — | .3 | .0 | .0 | **.3** | .8 |
| Career | | 49 | 3 | 8.3 | .279 | .224 | .920 | 1.1 | .3 | .3 | .2 | 2.0 |

=== College ===
| Year | Team | GP | GS | MPG | FG% | 3P% | FT% | RPG | APG | SPG | BPG | PPG |
|---|---|---|---|---|---|---|---|---|---|---|---|---|
| 2016–17 | Saint Joseph's | 31 | 30 | 34.2 | .375 | **.384** | .819 | 5.0 | 1.1 | .8 | .7 | 12.8 |
| 2017–18 | Saint Joseph's | Redshirt | | | | | | | | | | |
| 2018–19 | Saint Joseph's | **32** | **31** | **35.6** | **.430** | .356 | **.845** | **6.2** | **1.5** | **1.1** | **.8** | **19.0** |
| Career | | 63 | 61 | 34.9 | .407 | .370 | .836 | 5.6 | 1.3 | .9 | .7 | 16.0 |
