= Donte DiVincenzo =

Italian-American basketball player (born 1997)

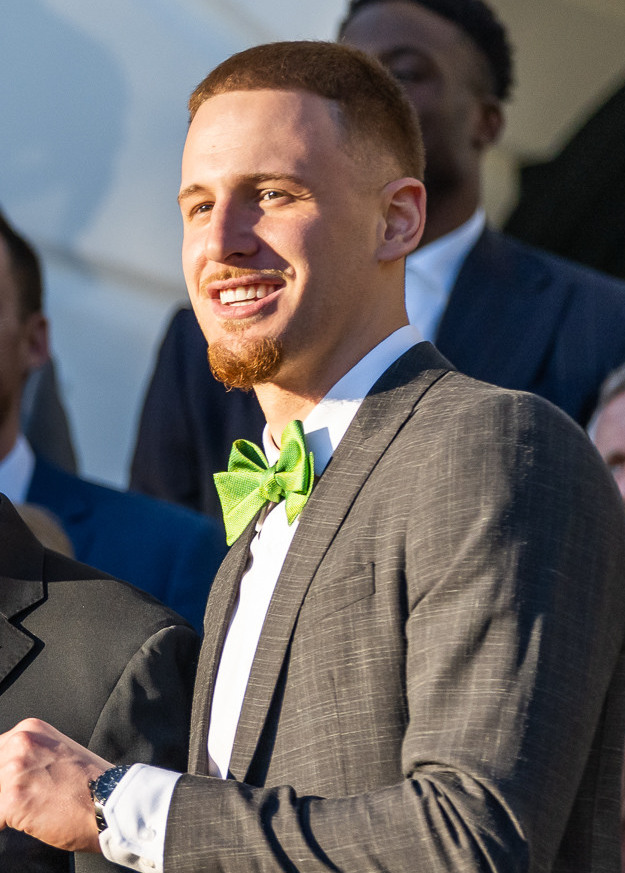
- DiVincenzo in 2021

No. 0 – Minnesota Timberwolves
- Position: Shooting guard
- League: NBA

Personal information
- Born: January 31, 1997 (age 29) Newark, Delaware, U.S.
- Listed height: 6 ft 4 in (1.93 m)
- Listed weight: 203 lb (92 kg)

Career information
- High school: Salesianum (Wilmington, Delaware)
- College: Villanova (2015–2018)
- NBA draft: 2018: 1st round, 17th overall pick
- Drafted by: Milwaukee Bucks
- Playing career: 2018–present

Career history
- 2018–2022: Milwaukee Bucks
- 2018: →Wisconsin Herd
- 2022: Sacramento Kings
- 2022–2023: Golden State Warriors
- 2023–2024: New York Knicks
- 2024–present: Minnesota Timberwolves

Career highlights
- NBA champion (2021); 2× NCAA champion (2016, 2018); NCAA Final Four Most Outstanding Player (2018); Big East Sixth Man of the Year (2018); Big East All-Freshman team (2017)
- Stats at NBA.com
- Stats at Basketball Reference

Donte Michael DiVincenzo (/ˈdɒnteɪ ˌdiːvɪnˈtʃɛnzoʊ/ DON-tay DEE-vin-CHEN-zoh; born January 31, 1997) is an Italian-American professional basketball player for the Minnesota Timberwolves of the National Basketball Association (NBA). He played college basketball for the Villanova Wildcats, where he won national championships in 2016 and 2018, being named Final Four Most Outstanding Player (MOP) in 2018.

Selected with the 17th overall pick by the Milwaukee Bucks in the 2018 NBA draft, DiVincenzo won his first championship with the Bucks in 2021, before being traded to the Sacramento Kings the following season. He has since played for the Golden State Warriors, New York Knicks, and Minnesota Timberwolves. He holds the Knicks franchise records for single-game and single-season three-point shots made.

== Early life ==
DiVincenzo was born in Newark, Delaware, to parents John F. and Kathie DiVincenzo. He has a brother, John, and a sister, Allison. Growing up, he played soccer before switching to basketball in high school. DiVincenzo attended Salesianum School in Wilmington, Delaware, where he led the team to back-to-back state championships. As a junior, he averaged 15.8 points, 4.7 rebounds and 2.9 assists per game and played basketball in the Nike EYBL for Team Final. He averaged 22.9 points, 9.0 rebounds and 4.0 assists per game as a senior. He was named Delaware Sportswriters and Broadcasters Association's Boys' Basketball Player of the Year in 2015. In 2025, he gained Italian citizenship.

== College career ==
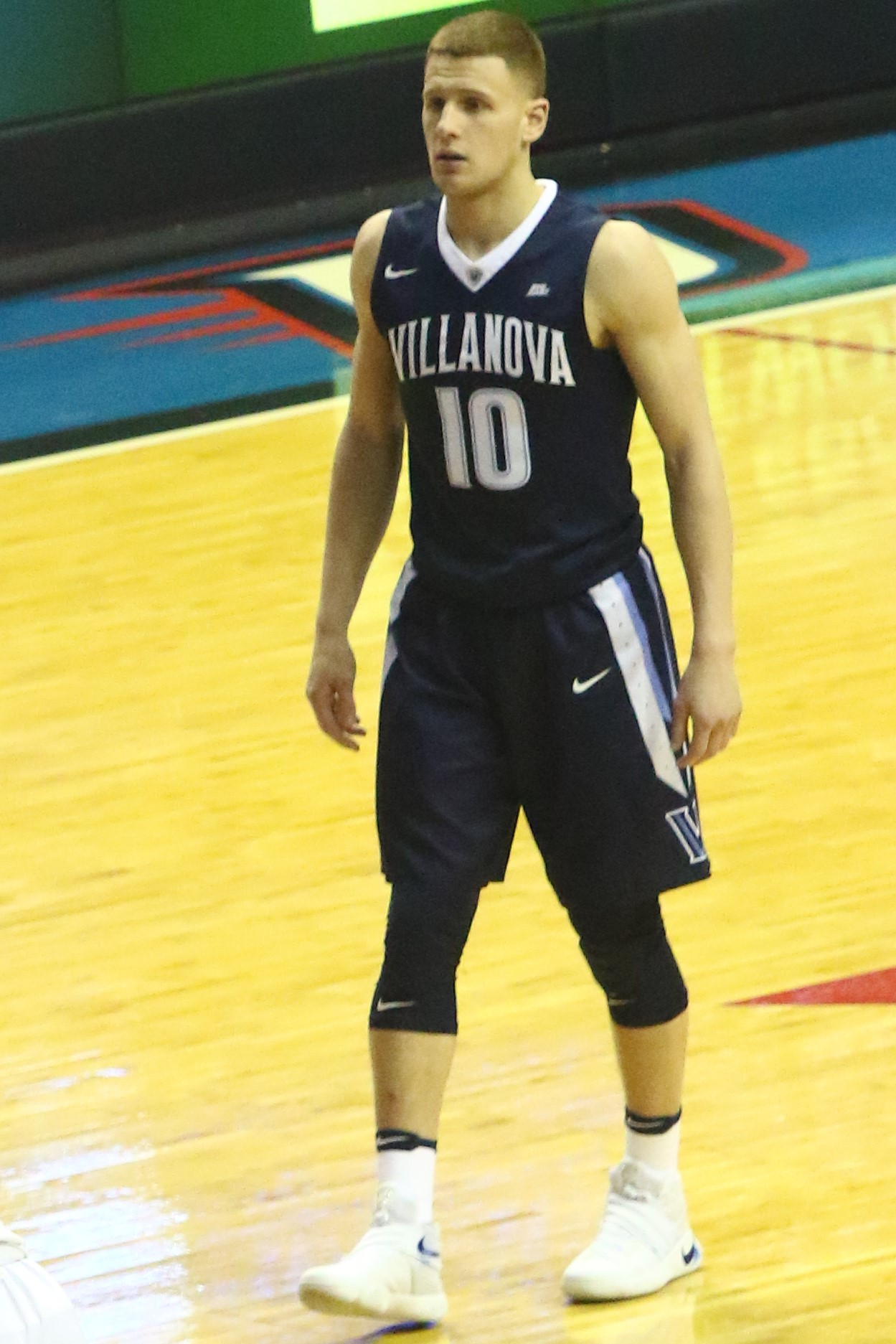
DiVincenzo with Villanova in 2017

DiVincenzo appeared in nine games during his true freshman year for Villanova before sitting out with a fractured fifth metatarsal bone in his right foot. The following season, in his redshirt freshman season, DiVincenzo averaged 8.8 points and 3.8 rebounds per game. He registered 19 points, three rebounds, and two assists in a 70–57 victory against St. John's on January 14, 2017. On March 9, DiVincenzo had a season-high 25 points to go with five rebounds and four assists in a 108–67 rematch win over St. John's. In the NCAA Tournament, he scored 21 points and grabbed 13 rebounds in a 76–56 victory over Mount St. Mary's in the first round. DiVincenzo was named to the Big East All-Freshman team and the Philadelphia Big Five Rookie of the Year.

In his sophomore season, DiVincenzo had a then career-high 30 points in an 86–75 win over Butler on February 10, 2018. At the conclusion of the regular season, he was named Big East Sixth Man of the Year. In the Elite Eight of the 2018 NCAA Tournament, DiVincenzo had 12 points and eight rebounds in a 71–59 win over Texas Tech. DiVincenzo was named the NCAA Final Four Most Outstanding Player following their championship win over Michigan, in which he scored a career-high 31 points (including five three-point baskets) and recorded five rebounds, three assists and two blocked shots. In addition, he scored the most points in an NCAA Final Four game for a player coming off the bench.

DiVincenzo was dubbed the "Big Ragu" by sportscaster Gus Johnson following his last-second tip-in in a game on January 29, 2017, which gave Villanova the win against the University of Virginia. The nickname was given to him ostensibly due to his Italian heritage and his red hair. When Johnson came up with the nickname, he was probably referring to another "Big Ragu", a character named Carmine Ragusa on the 1970s–80s sitcom Laverne & Shirley, who was also Italian. On April 19, 2018, DiVincenzo announced he would declare for the 2018 NBA draft without hiring an agent, thereby leaving open the possibility of a return to Villanova. On May 29, 2018, DiVincenzo announced he would remain in the draft and hire an agent, forgoing his final two years of eligibility at Villanova.

== Professional career ==
=== Milwaukee Bucks (2018–2022) ===
On June 21, 2018, DiVincenzo was selected with the 17th overall pick by the Milwaukee Bucks in the 2018 NBA draft, the second of four Villanova players drafted that year. On July 10, 2018, the Milwaukee Bucks announced that they had signed DiVincenzo. He missed most of his rookie season with a foot injury. He scored a career-high 17 points in a win over the Minnesota Timberwolves in early November during his second season.

On December 16, 2019, DiVincenzo scored 5 points, grabbed 10 rebounds, recorded 9 assists, and recorded 3 steals in a 120–116 loss to the Dallas Mavericks. On January 16, 2020, DiVincenzo scored 19 points and recorded 3 rebounds in a 128–123 win against the Boston Celtics. That same season, he would record the 3rd highest defensive rating of any player in the league (teammate Giannis Antetokounmpo being 1st).

On May 4, 2021, DiVincenzo scored 10 points and grabbed 15 rebounds in a 124–118 win over the Brooklyn Nets. He ultimately received a championship ring as he was part of the 2021 team that won the NBA Finals, but did not play in any games after the first round of the playoffs due to a severe left ankle injury suffered against the Miami Heat. His injury was viewed as a hindrance to Milwaukee's ability to find postseason success, as they had not expected to play role players P. J. Tucker and Pat Connaughton so frequently.

On December 25, 2021, DiVincenzo made his return to the court after being out for six months, where he logged 3 points and 2 rebounds in 15 minutes of playing time during a 117–113 win over the Boston Celtics. On January 22, 2022, DiVincenzo scored a season high 20 points in a 133–127 win over the Sacramento Kings.

=== Sacramento Kings (2022) ===
On February 10, 2022, DiVincenzo was traded to the Sacramento Kings in a four-team trade that sent Serge Ibaka to the Bucks. On February 12, DiVincenzo scored seven points and recorded five assists in 19 minutes of playing time in his Kings debut, a 123–110 win over the Washington Wizards. DiVincenzo made 25 appearances (including one starts) for Sacramento, recording averages of 10.3 points, 4.4 rebounds, and 3.6 assists.

=== Golden State Warriors (2022–2023) ===
On July 8, 2022, DiVincenzo signed with the Golden State Warriors on a two-year, $9.3 million deal, with a player option on the second year. On January 27, 2023, DiVincenzo scored 12 points and recorded 11 assists during a 129–117 win over the Toronto Raptors. On March 11, DiVincenzo scored 20 points and grabbed 10 rebounds during a 125–120 overtime victory against the Milwaukee Bucks. He averaged 9.4 points, 4.4 rebounds and 3.5 assists in 72 regular-season games (starting in half of those games). He shot a career-high 39.7% from three-point range on 5.3 attempts per game. In June 2023, DiVincenzo turned down a $4.7 million player option for the second season and opted for free agency.

=== New York Knicks (2023–2024) ===
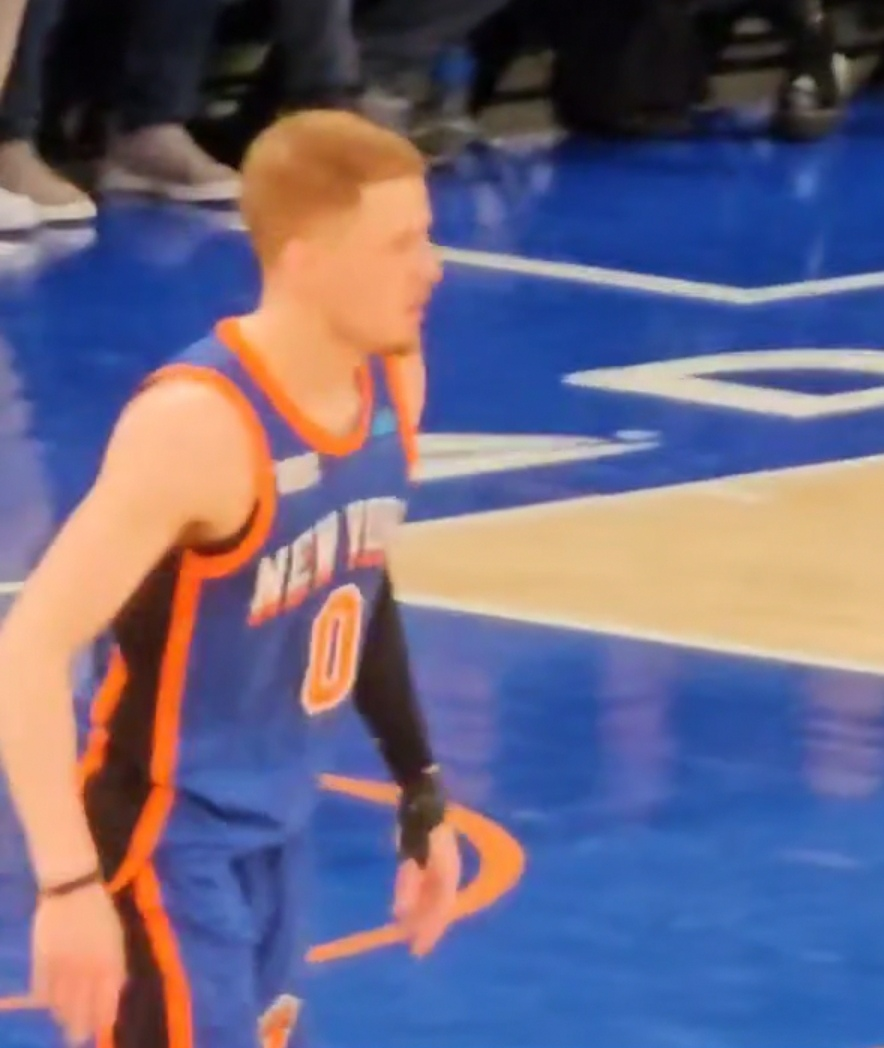
DiVincenzo with the Knicks

On July 8, 2023, DiVincenzo signed with the New York Knicks. He agreed to a four-year, $50 million deal with the Knicks. He joined Villanova teammates Jalen Brunson and Josh Hart. On March 25, 2024, DiVincenzo scored a career-high 40 points in a 124–99 victory over the Detroit Pistons. During this game, he also scored 11 three-pointers, setting a new Knicks franchise record for three-pointers in a single game. He finished the season with a franchise single-season record 283 three point shots made.

On April 22, 2024, DiVincenzo put up 19 points, including the game-winning three-pointer, in the Knicks' 104–101 victory in game 2 of the first round of the playoffs against the Philadelphia 76ers. In the second round against the Indiana Pacers, DiVincenzo set an NBA record for most three point shots made in a playoff game 7 (9). His 6 in the second half also set a game 7 record for threes in a half. Both records were tied by Buddy Hield on May 4, 2025. Ironically, Divincenzo's role on the 2015–16 Villanova Wildcats men's basketball team that won the national title was to impersonate Hield for the scout team. The Knicks were eliminated in seven games despite a 39-point performance from DiVincenzo in a 130–109 game 7 loss.

=== Minnesota Timberwolves (2024–present) ===
On October 2, 2024, DiVincenzo, Keita Bates-Diop, Julius Randle, and one lottery protected first–round pick were traded to the Minnesota Timberwolves as part of a three-team trade with the Charlotte Hornets in which Charlotte received, via sign-and-trade, DaQuan Jeffries, Charlie Brown Jr., Duane Washington Jr., three second-round picks and financial compensation. The Knicks acquired Karl-Anthony Towns and the draft rights to James Nnaji.

DiVincenzo started all 82 games for the Timberwolves during the 2025–26 season, recording averages of 12.2 points, 4.1 rebounds, and 3.8 assists. In Game 4 of the 2026 first round, Divincenzo tore his Achilles after an awkward landing in the first quarter, ruling him out for the remainder of the playoffs and likely the ensuing season.

== Career statistics ==
Legend
GP	Games played	GS	Games started	MPG	Minutes per game
FG%	Field goal percentage	3P%	3-point field goal percentage	FT%	Free throw percentage
RPG	Rebounds per game	APG	Assists per game	SPG	Steals per game
BPG	Blocks per game	PPG	Points per game	**Bold**	Career high
†	Won an NBA championship	*	Led the league

=== NBA ===
==== Regular season ====
Year	Team	GP	GS	MPG	FG%	3P%	FT%	RPG	APG	SPG	BPG	PPG
2018–19	Milwaukee	27	0	15.2	.403	.265	.750	2.4	1.1	.5	.2	4.9
2019–20	Milwaukee	66	24	23.0	**.455**	.336	.733	4.8	2.3	1.3	.3	9.2
2020–21†	Milwaukee	66	66	27.5	.420	.379	.718	**5.8**	3.1	1.1	.2	10.4
2021–22	Milwaukee	17	0	20.1	.331	.284	**.852**	3.5	1.7	.6	.2	7.2
2021–22	Sacramento	25	1	26.6	.362	.368	.839	4.4	3.6	**1.5**	.2	10.3
2022–23	Golden State	72	36	26.3	.435	.397	.817	4.5	3.5	1.3	.1	9.4
2023–24	New York	81	63	29.1	.443	**.401**	.754	3.7	2.7	1.3	**.4**	**15.5**
2024–25	Minnesota	62	10	25.9	.422	.397	.778	3.7	3.6	1.2	.3	11.7
2025–26	Minnesota	**82***	**82***	**30.4**	.406	.379	.743	4.1	**3.8**	1.3	**.4**	12.2
Career		498	282	26.3	.423	.380	.767	4.3	3.0	1.2	.3	11.0

==== Playoffs ====
Year	Team	GP	GS	MPG	FG%	3P%	FT%	RPG	APG	SPG	BPG	PPG
2020	Milwaukee	10	1	16.5	**.451**	.333	.650	3.2	1.2	.7	.3	6.6
2021†	Milwaukee	3	3	23.3	.188	.167	—	**6.3**	2.7	1.0	.3	2.7
2023	Golden State	13	1	18.1	.375	.341	.667	3.0	2.8	.8	.2	5.5
2024	New York	13	**13**	**35.8**	.419	**.425**	**.867**	4.0	2.6	1.2	**.9**	**17.8**
2025	Minnesota	**15**	0	25.1	.365	.318	.769	3.1	3.3	1.4	.3	8.7
2026	Minnesota	4	4	24.0	.500	.478	.000	3.8	**4.0**	**1.8**	.0	10.8
Career		58	22	24.3	.400	.367	.740	3.5	2.7	1.1	.4	9.5

=== College ===
Year	Team	GP	GS	MPG	FG%	3P%	FT%	RPG	APG	SPG	BPG	PPG
2015–16	Villanova	9	1	8.2	.286	.176	—	1.8	.4	.4	.0	1.7
2016–17	Villanova	36	1	25.5	.466	.365	.699	3.8	1.7	.9	**.3**	8.8
2017–18	Villanova	**40**	**10**	**29.3**	**.481**	**.401**	**.710**	**4.8**	**3.5**	**1.1**	.2	**13.4**
Career		85	12	25.4	.469	.378	.705	4.0	2.4	.9	.2	10.2

== Personal life ==
DiVincenzo has been in a relationship with his girlfriend Morgan Calantoni since 2017. They share a son, Kai, born in 2024. The couple also has several pet dogs. DiVincenzo has previously told the New York Post of their plans to open an establishment for rescue dogs after his NBA career.

== See also ==
- List of NBA single-game 3-point field goal leaders
