= Keita Bates-Diop =

American basketball player (born 1996)

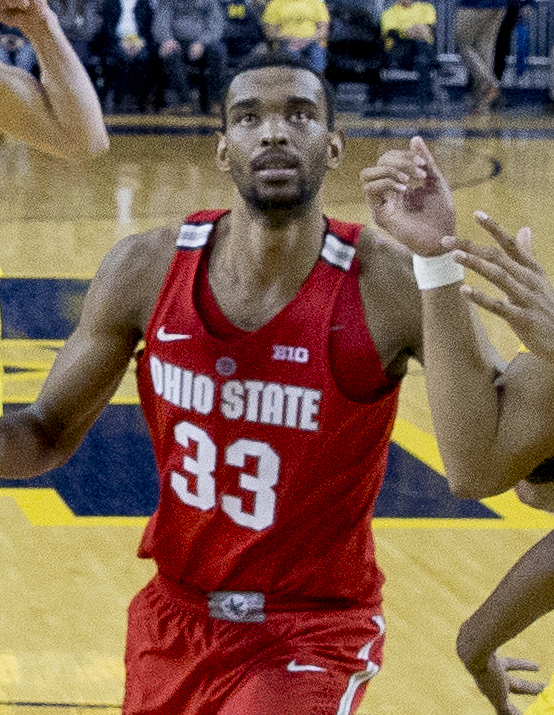
- Bates-Diop with Ohio State in 2018

Personal information
- Born: January 23, 1996 (age 30) Sacramento, California, U.S.
- Listed height: 6 ft 8 in (2.03 m)
- Listed weight: 229 lb (104 kg)

Career information
- High school: University (Normal, Illinois)
- College: Ohio State (2014–2018)
- NBA draft: 2018: 2nd round, 48th overall pick
- Drafted by: Minnesota Timberwolves
- Playing career: 2018–2025
- Position: Small forward / power forward
- Number: 33, 31, 6, 21, 13, 20
- Coaching career: 2025–present

Career history

Playing
- 2018–2020: Minnesota Timberwolves
- 2018–2019: →Iowa Wolves
- 2020: Denver Nuggets
- 2020: →Windy City Bulls
- 2020–2023: San Antonio Spurs
- 2023–2024: Phoenix Suns
- 2024: Brooklyn Nets
- 2025: Qingdao Eagles

Coaching
- 2025–2026: Sioux Falls Skyforce (assistant)

Career highlights
- Consensus second-team All-American (2018); Big Ten Player of the Year (2018); First-team All-Big Ten (2018)
- Stats at NBA.com
- Stats at Basketball Reference

Keita Bates-Diop (/ˈkeɪtə ˈbeɪts ˈdiːɒp/ KAY-tə BAYTS DEE-op; born January 23, 1996) is an American professional basketball coach and former player who most recently served as an assistant coach for the Sioux Falls Skyforce of the NBA G League. He played college basketball for the Ohio State Buckeyes.

Bates-Diop was selected by the Minnesota Timberwolves with the 48th overall pick in the 2018 NBA draft. He spent 1 and a half seasons with Minnesota before getting traded to the Denver Nuggets in 2020, but only appeared in 7 games for Denver. Bates-Diop would then play for the San Antonio Spurs over the next three seasons before signing with the Phoenix Suns in 2023 as a free agent. Halfway through the 2023-24 NBA season, the Suns traded Bates-Diop to the Brooklyn Nets in February of 2024 in a three team trade sending Royce O'Neale to Phoenix.

== Early life ==
Keita Bates-Diop was born on January 23, 1996, in Sacramento, California to Richard and Wilma Bates. His parents added Diop to his surname. His father Richard studied under Cheikh Anta Diop, a Senegalese scientist and anthropologist.

== High school career ==
Bates-Diop played for University High School in Normal, Illinois. He averaged 18.4 points, 6.7 rebounds and 2.3 blocks as a junior. He was considered one of the top 5 candidates for Illinois Mr. Basketball by the Chicago Tribune. Bates-Diop was ranked no. 24 nationally in his class by Rivals.com.

== College career ==
Bates-Diop was a bench player as a freshman at OSU in the 2014–15 season. As a sophomore, he expanded his role on the team and averaged 11.8 points and 6.4 rebounds per game. But as a junior, he suffered a stress fracture in his left leg, sitting out all but the first nine games, while the Buckeyes limped to a 17–15 record without him. In those nine games, Bates-Diop averaged 9.7 points and 5.2 rebounds per game. He was granted a medical redshirt and came into his redshirt junior campaign one of the top options for new coach Chris Holtmann.

Bates-Diop earned his first Big Ten Conference player of the week honors on December 11, 2017, after notching a career-high 27 points in a 97–62 win over William & Mary. On January 9, 2018, Bates-Diop was recognized as the Oscar Robertson National Player of the Week by the United States Basketball Writers Association after strong performances against Iowa and Michigan State. Bates-Diop tied a then-career high with 27 points and grabbed 13 rebounds in a victory against Iowa. Against top-ranked Michigan State, he scored a career-high 32 points in an 80–64 win. He also received his second Big Ten player of the week recognition. Bates-Diop received his second consecutive player of the week nod on January 15, with a 26-point, eight-rebound outing in a 91–69 win over Maryland and 20 points and nine rebounds in a victory versus Rutgers.

On February 26, 2018, Bates-Diop was named the Big Ten Player of the Year. He averaged 19.8 points and 8.7 rebounds per game. Following Ohio State's loss in the 2018 NCAA men's basketball tournament, Bates-Diop announced his intention to forgo his final season of collegiate eligibility and declared for the 2018 NBA draft.

== Professional career ==
=== Minnesota Timberwolves / Iowa Wolves (2018–2020) ===
On June 21, 2018, Bates-Diop was drafted by the Minnesota Timberwolves with the 48th pick in the 2018 NBA draft. On July 7, 2018, he signed with the Timberwolves. Bates-Diop participated in the NBA Summer League in 2018 and 2019.

=== Denver Nuggets / Windy City Bulls (2020) ===
On February 5, 2020, the Timberwolves traded Bates-Diop to the Denver Nuggets in a four-team trade. He was assigned to the Windy City Bulls on March 1. He was waived by the Nuggets on November 22, 2020.

=== San Antonio Spurs (2020–2023) ===
On November 29, 2020, the San Antonio Spurs announced that they had signed Bates-Diop to a two-way contract. On September 7, 2021, the Spurs re-signed Bates-Diop to a two-year, $3.6 million contract. On December 23, 2021, Bates-Diop scored a career-high 30 points on 11-of-11 shooting with seven rebounds and a steal in a 138–110 win over the Los Angeles Lakers.

=== Phoenix Suns (2023–2024) ===
On July 4, 2023, Bates-Diop signed a two-year, $5 million contract with the Phoenix Suns.

=== Brooklyn Nets (2024) ===
On February 8, 2024, Bates-Diop was traded to the Brooklyn Nets in a three-team trade involving the Memphis Grizzlies. On March 27, 2024, the Nets announced that Bates-Diop would miss the rest of the season due to a fractured tibia.

On July 6, 2024, Bates-Diop was traded to the New York Knicks alongside Mikal Bridges and one second-round pick in exchange for Bojan Bogdanović, Mamadi Diakite, Shake Milton, 4 unprotected first-round picks, an unprotected pick swap, a top four protected first round pick, and an unprotected second-round pick. Before ever appearing in a game for the Knicks, on October 2, 2024, Bates-Diop was traded back to the Minnesota Timberwolves in a three team trade involving the Charlotte Hornets in which Minnesota also acquired Donte DiVincenzo, Julius Randle, and one Lottery Protected first-round pick. The Hornets received DaQuan Jeffries, Charlie Brown Jr., Duane Washington Jr., three second-round picks and draft compensation. New York acquired Karl-Anthony Towns and the draft rights to James Nnaji. On October 21, he was waived by the Timberwolves after playing only two preseason games.

=== Qingdao Eagles (2025) ===
On February 20, 2025, Bates-Diop signed with the Qingdao Eagles of the Chinese Basketball Association (CBA).

== Coaching career ==
=== Sioux Falls Skyforce (2025–2026) ===
On October 23, 2025, Bates-Diop was hired by the Sioux Falls Skyforce of the NBA G League as an assistant coach.

== Career statistics ==
Legend
GP	Games played	GS	Games started	MPG	Minutes per game
FG%	Field goal percentage	3P%	3-point field goal percentage	FT%	Free throw percentage
RPG	Rebounds per game	APG	Assists per game	SPG	Steals per game
BPG	Blocks per game	PPG	Points per game	**Bold**	Career high

=== NBA ===
==== Regular season ====
Year	Team	GP	GS	MPG	FG%	3P%	FT%	RPG	APG	SPG	BPG	PPG
2018–19	Minnesota	30	3	16.8	.423	.250	.643	2.8	.6	.6	.5	5.0
2019–20	Minnesota	37	0	17.5	.422	.330	.708	3.0	.8	.5	.5	6.8
2019–20	Denver	7	0	14.0	.464	.333	.800	2.4	.0	.3	**.6**	5.4
2020–21	San Antonio	30	0	8.2	.448	.294	.667	1.6	.4	.4	.2	2.6
2021–22	San Antonio	59	14	16.2	**.517**	.309	.754	**3.9**	.7	.5	.2	5.7
2022–23	San Antonio	**67**	**42**	**21.7**	.508	**.394**	.793	3.7	**1.5**	**.7**	.3	**9.7**
2023–24	Phoenix	39	8	15.3	.427	.313	.722	2.6	.9	.6	.5	4.5
2023–24	Brooklyn	14	0	4.8	.500	.200	**1.000**	.6	.3	.2	.1	1.6
Career		283	67	16.1	.474	.333	.751	3.0	.9	.5	.3	6.0

==== Playoffs ====
Year	Team	GP	GS	MPG	FG%	3P%	FT%	RPG	APG	SPG	BPG	PPG
2020	Denver	5	0	4.8	.200	.000	.500	1.2	.2	.0	.0	.6

=== College ===
Year	Team	GP	GS	MPG	FG%	3P%	FT%	RPG	APG	SPG	BPG	PPG
2014–15	Ohio State	33	0	9.9	.473	**.462**	.679	2.1	.5	.3	.6	3.8
2015–16	Ohio State	33	33	31.5	.453	.324	.787	6.4	1.1	.7	1.2	11.8
2016–17	Ohio State	9	3	23.3	**.500**	.200	.714	5.2	1.3	.2	1.3	9.7
2017–18	Ohio State	**34**	**34**	**33.1**	.480	.359	**.794**	**8.7**	**1.6**	**.9**	**1.6**	**19.8**
Career		109	70	24.8	.472	.352	.776	5.7	1.1	.6	1.2	11.7
