= Mamadi Diakite =

Guinean basketball player (born 1997)

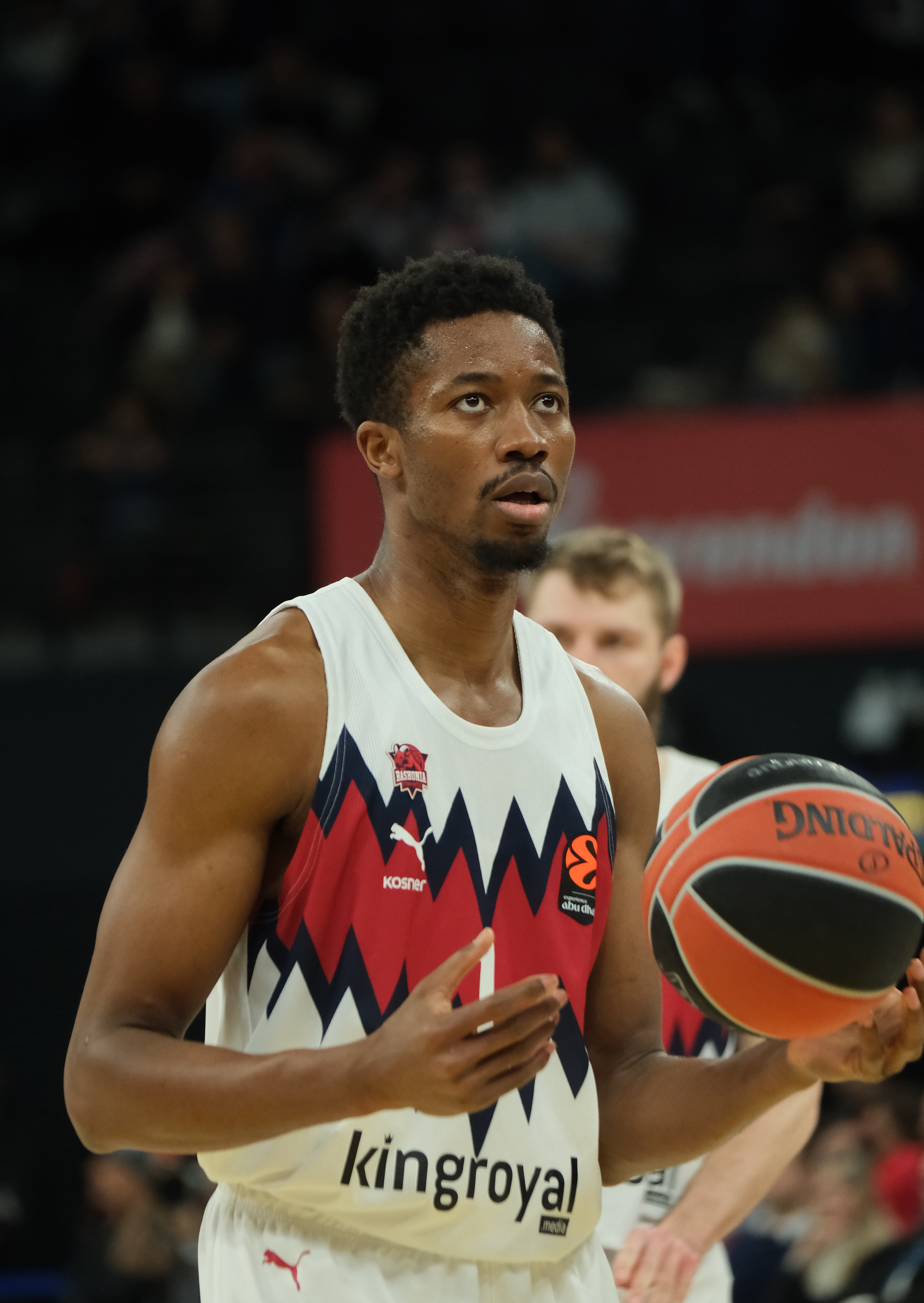
- Diakite with Baskonia in 2026

No. 21 – Dubai Basketball
- Position: Center / power forward
- League: ABA League; EuroLeague

Personal information
- Born: January 21, 1997 (age 29) Conakry, Guinea
- Listed height: 6 ft 9 in (2.06 m)
- Listed weight: 228 lb (103 kg)

Career information
- High school: Blue Ridge School (Saint George, Virginia)
- College: Virginia (2016–2020)
- NBA draft: 2020: undrafted
- Playing career: 2020–present

Career history
- 2020–2021: Milwaukee Bucks
- 2021: →Lakeland Magic
- 2022: Oklahoma City Thunder
- 2022–2023: Cleveland Cavaliers
- 2022–2023: →Cleveland Charge
- 2023–2024: Westchester Knicks
- 2024: San Antonio Spurs
- 2024: →Austin Spurs
- 2024: New York Knicks
- 2024–2025: Valley Suns
- 2025–2026: Baskonia
- 2026–present: Dubai Basketball

Career highlights
- NBA champion (2021); NBA G League champion (2021); NBA G League Showcase Cup champion (2023); All-NBA G League First Team (2021); NBA G League All-Defensive Team (2021); NBA G League All-Rookie Team (2021); Spanish Cup winner (2026); NCAA champion (2019); Second-team All-ACC (2020)
- Stats at NBA.com
- Stats at Basketball Reference

Mamadi Diakite (born January 21, 1997) is a Guinean professional basketball player for Dubai Basketball of the ABA League and the EuroLeague. He played college basketball for the Virginia Cavaliers, with whom he won an NCAA national championship in 2019. He also won an NBA championship with the Milwaukee Bucks in 2021.

== Early life ==
Diakite was born in Conakry, Guinea to Aboubacar Sidiki Diakite and Aminata Kaba and was raised as a Muslim. His father was the health inspector general of Guinea and his mother was an obstetrician. Diakite grew up playing soccer in streets and parks but later started playing basketball because of his height and athleticism. Due to the lack of basketball opportunities in Guinea, he tried to draw attention from the United States through Facebook. As a result, Diakite was contacted by Hassan Fofana, a Guinea native and former college basketball player, and with his help joined Blue Ridge School, a boarding school in Saint George, Virginia.

== High school career ==
Diakite enrolled at Blue Ridge School in early 2014. When he first came to the United States, he could only speak French, and Guinean former basketball player Mamadi Diane was among those who helped him acclimate. Diakite played two basketball seasons at Blue Ridge School and also earned varsity letters in track and field and soccer, because the school required students to play a sport each season. As a senior in basketball, he averaged 12 points, eight rebounds, and four blocks per game while leading his team to the Virginia Independent Schools Athletic Association (VISAA) Division II state title and a Virginia Independent Conference (VIC) championship. Diakite was named second-team All-VIC in soccer in 2014–15, and he won back-to-back VIC high jump titles. In basketball, he was a consensus four-star recruit and the top prospect in the state of Virginia. On August 4, 2015, Diakite committed to play for Virginia, turning down offers from several other NCAA Division I programs, including Baylor, USC and Washington.

== College career ==
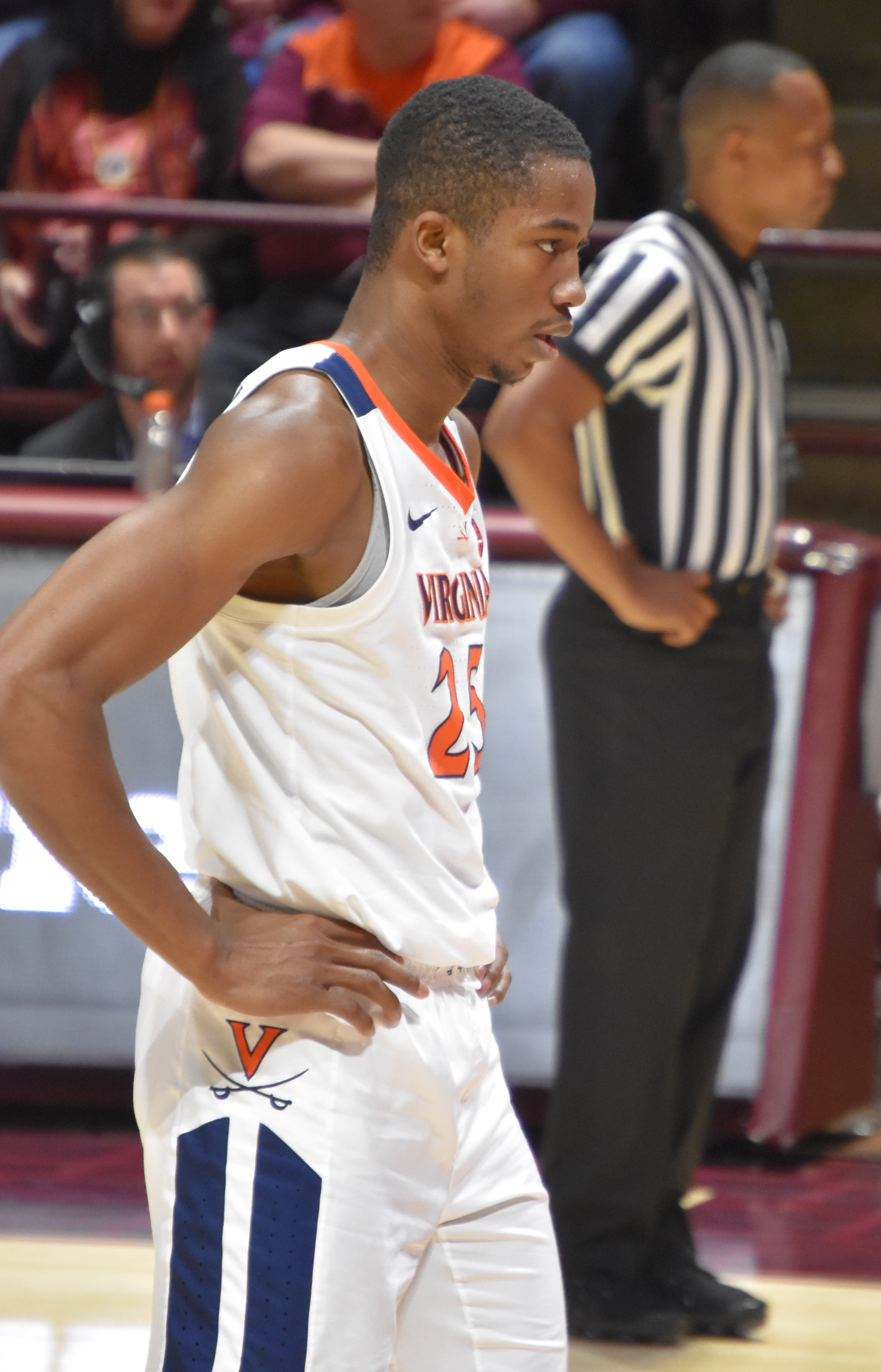
Diakite at Virginia.

After committing to Virginia, Diakite reclassified to the class of 2015 and redshirted his first college basketball season with Virginia, hoping to physically prepare for college basketball and adjust to the college lifestyle during 2015–16. He debuted as a redshirt freshman on November 15, 2016, recording eight points and four rebounds in a 72–32 win over St. Francis Brooklyn. On December 6, Diakite scored a season-high 12 points in a 76–53 victory over East Carolina. Through 32 games in the season, he averaged 3.8 points, 2.6 rebounds, and 1.2 blocks per game. As a redshirt sophomore on November 23, 2017, Diakite matched his career high in scoring, with 12 points and five rebounds in a 68–42 win over Vanderbilt at the NIT Season Tip-Off. On February 3, 2018, he chipped in 12 points for a second time, in a 59–44 victory over Syracuse. Through 34 games, Diakite averaged 5.4 points, 3.0 rebounds and 0.5 blocks per game.

In the third game of his 2018–19 redshirt junior season, he recorded a career-high 18 points on November 16, in a 97–40 win over Coppin State. Diakite matched his career high on January 9, 2019, posting 18 points, seven rebounds, and two blocks in an 83–56 victory over Boston College. On March 30, in the Elite Eight round of the 2019 NCAA tournament, he recorded 14 points, seven rebounds and four blocks in an 80–75 overtime win over third-seeded Purdue. Diakite made a buzzer-beating shot to send the game to overtime. In the Final Four, they played Auburn. Diakite grabbed 6 rebounds and played a total of 36 minutes, but had only 2 points on 25% shooting. Virginia won the game 63–62 after teammate Kyle Guy made 3 free throws. In the 2019 national championship, they played Texas Tech. Diakite had 9 points on 50% shooting, and grabbed 7 rebounds in 25 minutes of playing time. Virginia won the game in overtime 85–77, giving Virginia its first-ever national championship.

He dyed his hair blonde in late February 2019 then kept that essential look for the remainder of his college career.

He declared for the 2019 NBA draft after winning the national championship but withdrew his name from the draft before the withdrawal deadline date to return to Virginia for his last season of eligibility.

Diakite set a new career high of 19 points to go with 13 rebounds in a 65–34 win against James Madison on November 10, 2019. He matched his career high of 19 points on November 19, helping the Cavaliers defeat Vermont 61–55. Diakite set a new career high of 21 points in a 70–59 loss to South Carolina on December 22. At the conclusion of the regular season, Diakite was selected to the Second Team All-ACC.

== Professional career ==
=== Milwaukee Bucks (2020–2021) ===
After going undrafted in the 2020 NBA draft, Diakite signed a two-way contract with the Milwaukee Bucks on November 24, 2020. When the Wisconsin Herd made the decision to not play the 2020–21 season, Diakite was sent to the Lakeland Magic to fulfill the G League part of his contract, making his debut for Lakeland on February 11, 2021. He appeared in 12 games with Lakeland while averaging 18.5 points, 10.3 rebounds, 2.1 blocks and 2.1 assists in 27.7 minutes and was named to the All-NBA G League First Team, the NBA G League All-Defensive Team and the NBA G League All-Rookie Team en route to the G League title with Lakeland.

On April 21, 2021, Diakite signed a multi-year standard NBA contract after making 11 appearances with the Bucks. He won the NBA championship in his rookie season with the Bucks. On September 24, he was waived by Milwaukee.

=== Oklahoma City Thunder (2022) ===
On September 26, 2021, Diakite was claimed off waivers by the Oklahoma City Thunder. However, he was waived on October 16.

On January 11, 2022, Diakite signed a 10-day agreement with the Thunder. Diakite signed a second 10-day contract on January 21. He signed a third 10-day contract with the Thunder on January 31. On February 9, he was released by the team, in order to open up a roster spot for KZ Okpala, acquired in a trade with the Miami Heat.

=== Cleveland Cavaliers (2022–2023) ===
On September 26, 2022, Diakite signed with the Cleveland Cavaliers. He was waived on October 15, but was re-signed to a two-way contract by the team two days later. He would end up playing in 22 games, starting in two. In the first game where he started against NBA MVP Joel Embiid, he held the superstar to just 19 points, 6 rebounds, 6 assists, and 37.5% from the field. He also drained 2 three-pointers during the matchup. In his second start of the season, Diakite was matched up against the New York Knicks where he recorded 2 rebounds and a block. While most of the time he was traveling with the G League affiliate, he never missed out on too much.

=== Westchester Knicks (2023) ===
On October 19, 2023, Diakite signed with the New York Knicks, but was waived two days later. On November 9, 2023, Diakite was named to the opening-night roster for the Westchester Knicks.

=== San Antonio / Austin Spurs (2024) ===
On January 1, 2024, Diakite signed a two-way contract with the San Antonio Spurs and on March 2, he was waived by the Spurs.

=== Return to Westchester / New York Knicks (2024) ===
On March 6, 2024, Diakite returned to the Westchester Knicks and on March 14, he signed a 10-day contract with the New York Knicks. On March 25, he signed with New York for the rest of the season.

On July 6, 2024, Diakite was traded to the Brooklyn Nets alongside Bojan Bogdanović, Shake Milton, four unprotected first-round picks, an unprotected pick swap and a second-round pick in exchange for Mikal Bridges, Keita Bates-Diop and a second–round pick. Before he could appear in a game for the Nets, Diakite was traded, alongside the draft rights to Nemanja Dangubić, to the Memphis Grizzlies in exchange for Ziaire Williams and a second-round pick and on August 27, he was waived by the Grizzlies.

=== Valley Suns (2024–2025) ===
On September 26, 2024, Diakite signed with the Phoenix Suns, but was waived on October 14. On October 27, he joined the Valley Suns.

=== Baskonia (2025–2026) ===
On August 18, 2025, Diakite signed with Saski Baskonia on a two-year contract. He spent one season with the Spanish EuroLeague club before mutually parting ways in July 2026.

== Career statistics ==
Legend
GP	Games played	GS	Games started	MPG	Minutes per game
FG%	Field goal percentage	3P%	3-point field goal percentage	FT%	Free throw percentage
RPG	Rebounds per game	APG	Assists per game	SPG	Steals per game
BPG	Blocks per game	PPG	Points per game	**Bold**	Career high
†	Won an NBA championship

=== NBA ===
==== Regular season ====
Year	Team	GP	GS	MPG	FG%	3P%	FT%	RPG	APG	SPG	BPG	PPG
2020–21†	Milwaukee	14	1	10.1	.400	.125	.786	2.4	.6	**.5**	.4	3.1
2021–22	Oklahoma City	13	**3**	**14.4**	.532	.000	.545	**4.5**	.2	.4	**.7**	**4.3**
2022–23	Cleveland	**22**	2	8.0	.480	**.333**	**1.000**	1.4	.4	.2	.4	2.6
2023–24	San Antonio	3	0	5.3	**.800**	—	.667	1.0	**.7**	.0	.3	4.0
2023–24	New York	3	0	2.8	.000	.000	—	.3	.0	.3	.0	.0
Career		55	6	9.6	.483	.229	.697	2.3	.4	.3	.4	3.1

==== Playoffs ====
Year	Team	GP	GS	MPG	FG%	3P%	FT%	RPG	APG	SPG	BPG	PPG
2021†	Milwaukee	**7**	0	**5.0**	**.200**	**.500**	**1.000**	**1.0**	.0	**.4**	.1	**1.0**
2024	New York	4	0	3.7	.000	.000	**1.000**	.8	**.3**	.3	**.3**	.5
Career		11	0	4.5	.154	.250	1.000	.9	.1	.4	.2	.8

=== College ===
Year	Team	GP	GS	MPG	FG%	3P%	FT%	RPG	APG	SPG	BPG	PPG
2015–16	Virginia	Redshirt										
2016–17	Virginia	32	0	14.0	.543	.273	.545	2.6	.2	.3	1.2	3.8
2017–18	Virginia	34	0	15.6	**.577**	–	**.780**	3.0	.1	.4	.5	5.4
2018–19	Virginia	**38**	22	21.8	.550	.294	.700	4.4	.3	.4	**1.7**	7.4
2019–20	Virginia	30	**30**	**32.8**	.478	**.364**	.754	**6.8**	**.6**	**.8**	1.3	**13.7**
Career		134	52	20.9	.524	.337	.720	4.1	.3	.5	1.2	7.4

== Personal life ==
Diakite is a fluent speaker of French, Maninka, Susu and Fula. He began learning English when he arrived in the United States to attend Blue Ridge School. In 2014, his father Aboubacar Sidiki Diakite, health inspector general of Guinea, began leading his country's efforts against the West African Ebola virus epidemic in association with the World Health Organization. At the University of Virginia, Diakite was a French major and Global Culture and Commerce minor. In February 2019, he dyed his hair gold as "a nod to when he played soccer as a youth" in Guinea.

== See also ==
- List of All-Atlantic Coast Conference men's basketball teams
