= Duane Washington Jr. =

American-German basketball player (born 2000)

- Washington with Bayern Munich in 2026

No. 4 – Bayern Munich
- Position: Point guard
- League: BBL; EuroLeague

Personal information
- Born: March 24, 2000 (age 26) Frankfurt, Germany
- Listed height: 1.91 m (6 ft 3 in)
- Listed weight: 197 lb (89 kg)

Career information
- High school: Grand Rapids Christian (Grand Rapids, Michigan); Sierra Canyon (Chatsworth, California)
- College: Ohio State (2018–2021)
- NBA draft: 2021: undrafted
- Playing career: 2021–present

Career history
- 2021–2022: Indiana Pacers
- 2021–2022: →Fort Wayne Mad Ants
- 2022–2023: Phoenix Suns
- 2023–2024: Westchester Knicks
- 2024–2026: Partizan
- 2026–present: Bayern Munich

Career highlights
- ABA League champion (2025); ABA League Top Scorer (2026); Serbian League champion (2025); Serbian League Finals MVP (2025); NBA G League Showcase Cup champion (2023); Third-team All-Big Ten (2021)
- Stats at NBA.com
- Stats at Basketball Reference

Duane Eddy Washington Jr. (born March 24, 2000) is an American-German professional basketball player for Bayern Munich of the German Basketball Bundesliga (BBL) and the EuroLeague. He played college basketball for the Ohio State Buckeyes. His father is former NBA player Duane Washington.

== Early life ==
Washington was born in Frankfurt, Germany, while his father was playing for Skyliners Frankfurt. Washington was raised in Grand Rapids, Michigan, and went to high school for his first three years at Grand Rapids Christian High School. He averaged 13.1 points and 4.5 assists as a junior. Washington transferred to Sierra Canyon School in Los Angeles before his senior season of high school. He transferred to go to live with his uncle Derek Fisher, and learn from the 5-Time NBA Champion. During his time at Sierra Canyon, he played with Scotty Pippen Jr., Cassius Stanley, and Kenyon Martin Jr. He averaged 15.5 points per game, 4.5 rebounds per game, and 3.8 assists per game as a senior.

Washington was considered a four-star recruit by ESPN and a three-star recruit by 247Sports and Rivals. On September 20, 2017, Washington committed to play college basketball for Ohio State over offers from teams such as Michigan, UCLA, and Butler.

College recruiting
Name	Hometown	School	Height	Weight	Commit date
Duane Washington Jr. PG / SG	Grand Rapids, MI	Sierra Canyon School (CA)	6 ft 3 in (1.91 m)	190 lb (86 kg)	Sep 20, 2017
Duane Washington Jr. PG / SG	Recruit ratings: Rivals: 247Sports: ESPN: (80)				
Overall recruit ranking: Rivals: 146 247Sports: 195 ESPN: —
Note: In many cases, Scout, Rivals, 247Sports, On3, and ESPN may conflict in their listings of height and weight.; In these cases, the average was taken. ESPN grades are on a 100-point scale.; Sources: "Ohio State 2018 Basketball Commitments". Rivals.; "2018 Ohio State Buckeyes Recruiting Class". ESPN.; "2018 Team Ranking". Rivals.

== College career ==
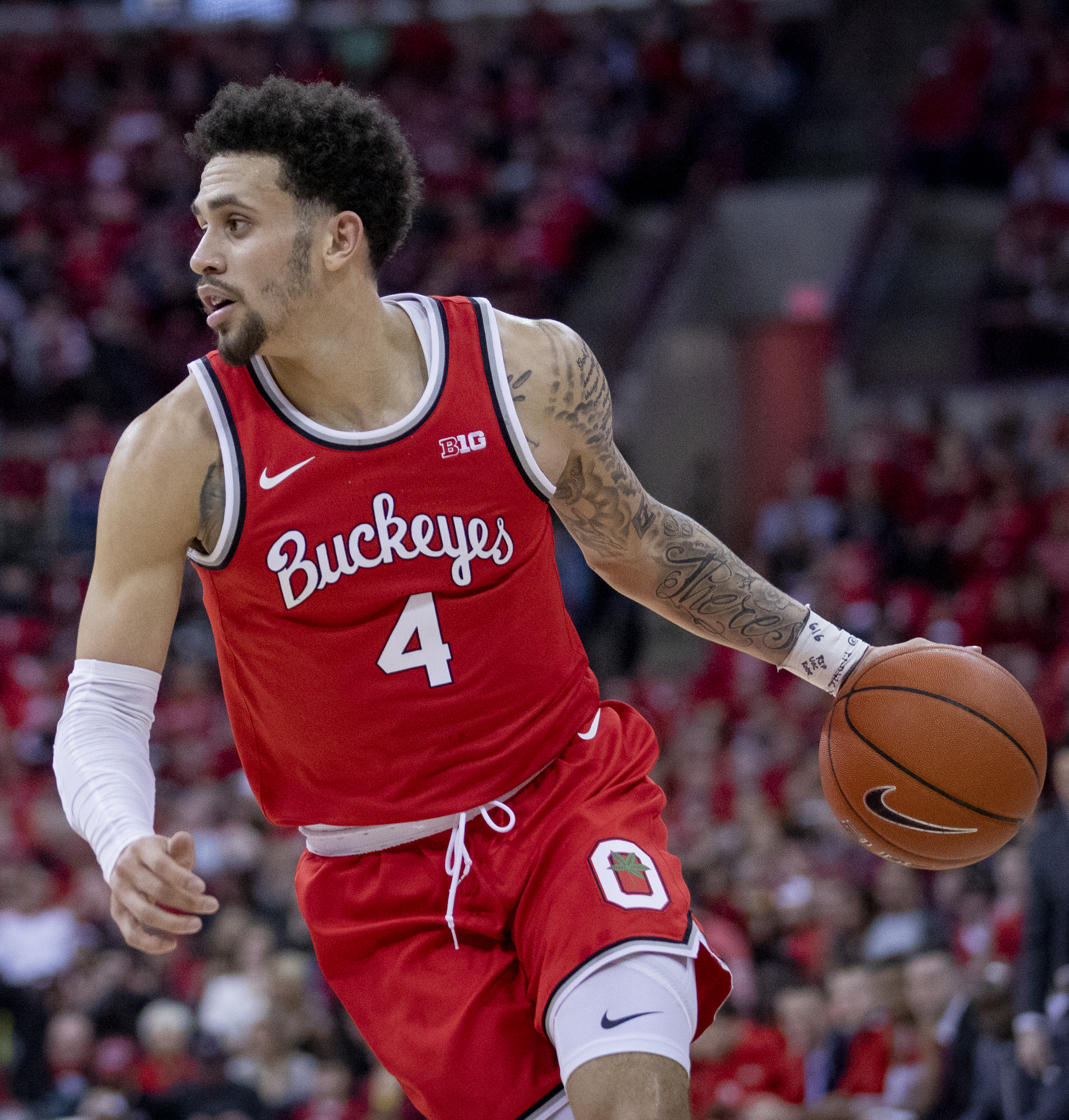
Washington with Ohio State in 2020

In Washington's second game at Ohio State against Purdue Fort Wayne, Washington scored 20 points in 21 minutes off the bench. For the year, he played in 35 games, starting two of them. He averaged 7 points per game, 2.5 rebounds per game, and 17.2 minutes per game.

During his sophomore year, Washington scored 20 points in a game two times, matching his career–high at the time. He, along with small forward Luther Muhammad, were suspended for the Nebraska game on January 14, 2019, for "failure to meet program standards". In total, he played in 28 games and started 15 of them. He averaged 11.5 points per game, which ranked second on the team.

Washington scored a career–high 30 points in an 87–92 loss against Michigan during his junior season. In the final seconds of Ohio State's overtime 2021 NCAA tournament first-round matchup against Oral Roberts, Washington missed what would've been a buzzer–beating three–pointer to tie the game and force double–overtime. Washington averaged 16.4 points, 3.4 rebounds, and 2.9 assists per game.

On March 31, 2021, Washington declared for the 2021 NBA draft while initially maintaining his college eligibility. However, on June 29, he announced he was remaining in the draft.

== Professional career ==
=== Indiana Pacers (2021–2022) ===
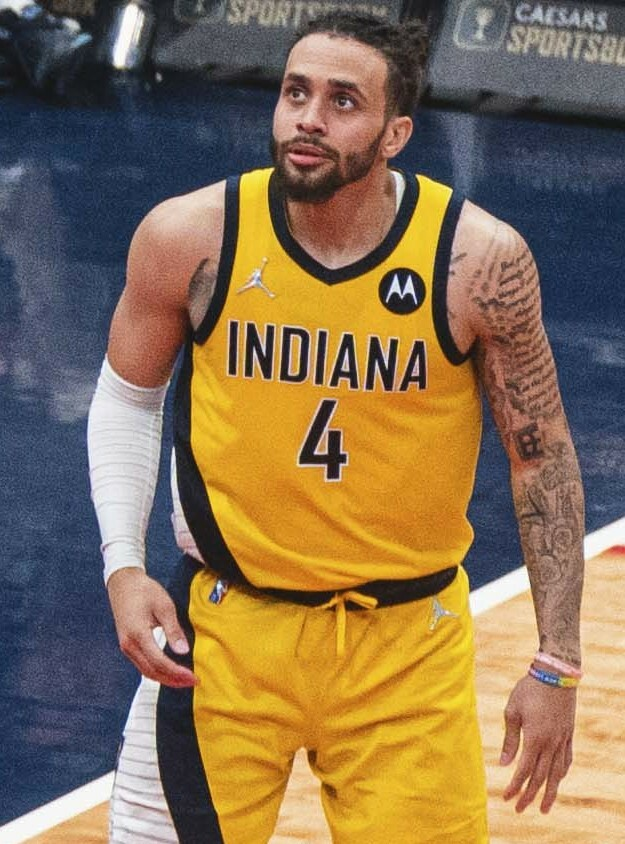
Washington with the Pacers in 2022

After going undrafted in the 2021 NBA draft, Washington signed a two-way contract with the Indiana Pacers on August 5, 2021, splitting time with their G League affiliate, the Fort Wayne Mad Ants. On January 24, 2022, Washington scored a team-high 21 points, knocking down seven 3-pointers, setting a franchise record for most threes by a rookie while becoming the 36th rookie in the league history to hit seven threes in a game. On April 7, the Pacers converted his two-way contract into a standard one.

On July 14, 2022, Washington was waived by the Pacers.

=== Phoenix Suns (2022–2023) ===
On August 3, 2022, Washington signed a two-way contract with the Phoenix Suns. On December 27, he scored a career-high 26 points, alongside four rebounds and eight assists, in a 125–108 win over the Memphis Grizzlies. On February 1, 2023, Washington was waived by the Suns.

=== Westchester Knicks (2023–2024) ===
On February 28, 2023, Washington signed a two-way contract with the New York Knicks, but was waived on July 24. Six days later, he re-signed with the Knicks, but was waived on October 21. Three days later, he signed another two-way contract, but was waived again on November 27. On January 3, 2024, Washington signed another two-way contract with New York, joining the team for the 2024 playoffs, however did not make an appearance.

=== Partizan (2024–2026) ===
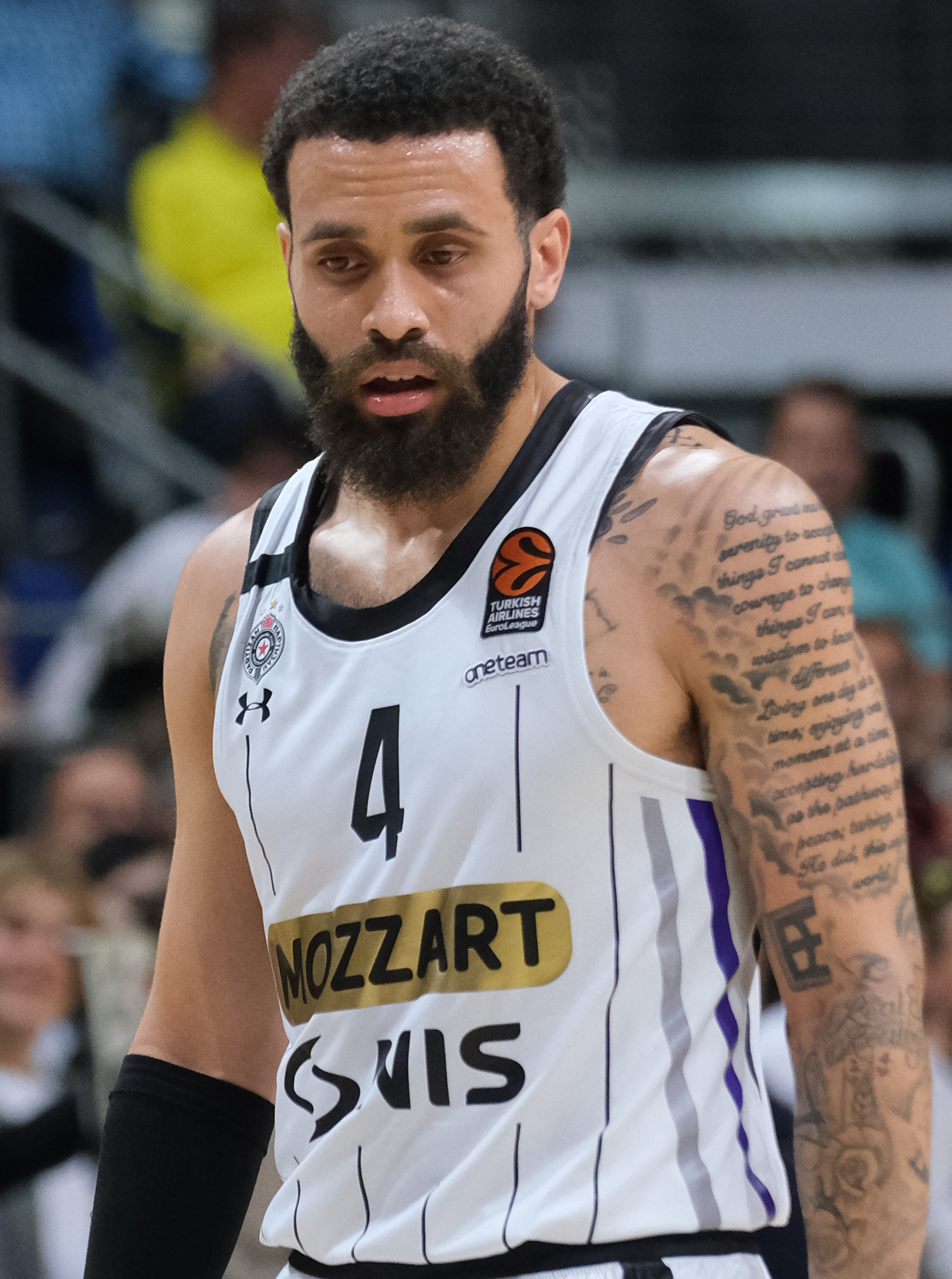
Washington with Partizan in 2024

On August 20, 2024, Washington signed with Partizan Mozzart Bet of the ABA League, Basketball League of Serbia (KLS) and the EuroLeague. He appeared in two ABA League games, averaging 6.5 points in 8.5 minutes of playing time.

On October 2, 2024, Washington was signed by the New York Knicks and then traded to the Charlotte Hornets in a three team trade also involving the Minnesota Timberwolves. The Timberwolves acquired Keita Bates-Diop, Donte DiVincenzo, Julius Randle, and one lottery protected first-round pick; the Hornets also received Charlie Brown Jr., DaQuan Jeffries, three second-round picks and draft compensation while the Knicks acquired Karl-Anthony Towns and the draft rights to James Nnaji. However, he was waived on October 9 and five days later, he rejoined Partizan.

In his debut season with Partizan, he averaged 7.6 points and 1.7 rebounds over 19 EuroLeague games, while shooting 38.2% from the field. During the 2024–25 season, Partizan managed to lift the record eighth ABA League championship, and the Serbian League championship, the first one after 11 seasons. For his performances during the Serbian League playoffs, Washington was named the top scorer and the Playoff MVP.

On December 22, 2025, in a 99–92 road win over Krka, Washington broke the ABA League record for most points scored in a single game with 48 points on 16-of-24 shooting, including 10 made three-pointers.

On June 12, 2026, following Partizan's Game 4 loss to Dubai Basketball in the ABA League Finals, Washington announced that he was leaving the club. One hour later, Partizan officially confirmed his departure through its social media channels.

=== Bayern Munich (2026–present) ===
On July 3, 2026, Washington signed a two–year deal with Bayern Munich of the German Basketball Bundesliga (BBL).

== Career statistics ==
Legend
GP	Games played	GS	Games started	MPG	Minutes per game
FG%	Field-goal percentage	3P%	3-point field-goal percentage	FT%	Free-throw percentage
RPG	Rebounds per game	APG	Assists per game	SPG	Steals per game
BPG	Blocks per game	PPG	Points per game	PIR	Performance index rating
**Bold**	Career high

=== EuroLeague ===
Year	Team	GP	GS	MPG	FG%	3P%	FT%	RPG	APG	SPG	BPG	PPG	PIR
2024–25	Partizan	19	1	14.6	.382	.240	.778	1.1	1.7	.4	.0	7.6	5.7
Career		19	1	14.6	.382	.240	.778	1.1	1.7	.4	.0	7.6	5.7

=== NBA ===
Year	Team	GP	GS	MPG	FG%	3P%	FT%	RPG	APG	SPG	BPG	PPG
2021–22	Indiana	**48**	**7**	**20.2**	**.405**	**.377**	**.754**	**1.7**	1.8	**.5**	.1	**9.9**
2022–23	Phoenix	31	3	12.7	.367	.360	.667	1.2	**2.0**	.2	.1	7.9
Career		79	10	17.2	.391	.371	.729	1.5	1.9	.4	.1	9.1

=== College ===
Year	Team	GP	GS	MPG	FG%	3P%	FT%	RPG	APG	SPG	BPG	PPG
2018–19	Ohio State	**35**	2	17.1	.370	.306	.647	2.5	1.1	.3	.0	7.0
2019–20	Ohio State	28	15	24.9	.403	**.393**	.833	2.8	1.4	**.4**	**.1**	11.5
2020–21	Ohio State	31	**31**	**32.2**	**.410**	.374	**.835**	**3.4**	**2.9**	**.4**	.0	**16.4**
Career		94	48	24.4	.397	.361	.800	2.9	1.8	.4	.0	11.4

== Personal life ==
Washington's father, Duane Washington Sr., and his uncle, Derek Fisher, both played in the NBA. Through his uncle, he became close with the late Kobe Bryant. Washington's cousin, Setric Millner Jr., is a basketball player and the two lived together while they attended Grand Rapids Christian High School. He is a dual citizen of the United States and Germany.
