= 2025–26 New York Knicks season =

Season of National Basketball Association team the New York Knicks

- NBA champions
- NBA Cup champions
- Conference champions
- Head coach: Mike Brown
- President: Leon Rose
- General manager: Gersson Rosas
- Owners: Madison Square Garden Sports
- Arena: Madison Square Garden

Results
- Record: 53–29 (.646)
- Place: Division: 2nd (Atlantic); Conference: 3rd (Eastern)
- Playoff finish: NBA champions (defeated Spurs 4–1)
- Stats at Basketball Reference

Local media
- Television: MSG TV
- Radio: WEPN-FM

The 2025–26 New York Knicks season was the 80th season of the franchise in the National Basketball Association (NBA). On June 3, 2025, the Knicks dismissed head coach Tom Thibodeau after five seasons with the team. On July 7, the Knicks hired Mike Brown as their head coach. The Knicks won the NBA Championship during this season, for the first time since 1973. It was their third title in franchise history, and their first in which their Finals opponent was not the Los Angeles Lakers.

In the 2025 NBA Cup, the Knicks won East Group C with a 3–1 group stage record to advance to the knockout stage for the third straight year, also doing so as a group winner for the second straight year, by clinching the tiebreaker over the Miami Heat via their head-to-head victory on November 14. In the knockout stage, they defeated the Toronto Raptors in the quarterfinals, the Orlando Magic in the semifinals, and finally the San Antonio Spurs in the championship round, winning the Cup title. The Knicks finished the tournament with a 6–1 record, becoming the first Cup champions to win the tournament title without a perfect record.

In a span from December 31 to January 19, the Knicks had a 2–9 stretch that featured two separate four-game losing streaks, their longest since the 2023–24 season. Following a loss to the Dallas Mavericks, the Knicks closed out the month with a five-game winning streak, which included a 120–66 victory over their rival, the Brooklyn Nets, which also broke a franchise record for the largest victory margin in a regular season game.

On March 30, the Knicks clinched the playoffs for the fourth consecutive season following a Philadelphia 76ers loss to the Miami Heat. On April 9, the Knicks improved over their 51–31 record from the previous season with a win over the Boston Celtics. They finished the regular season with a 53–29 record, placing third in the East.

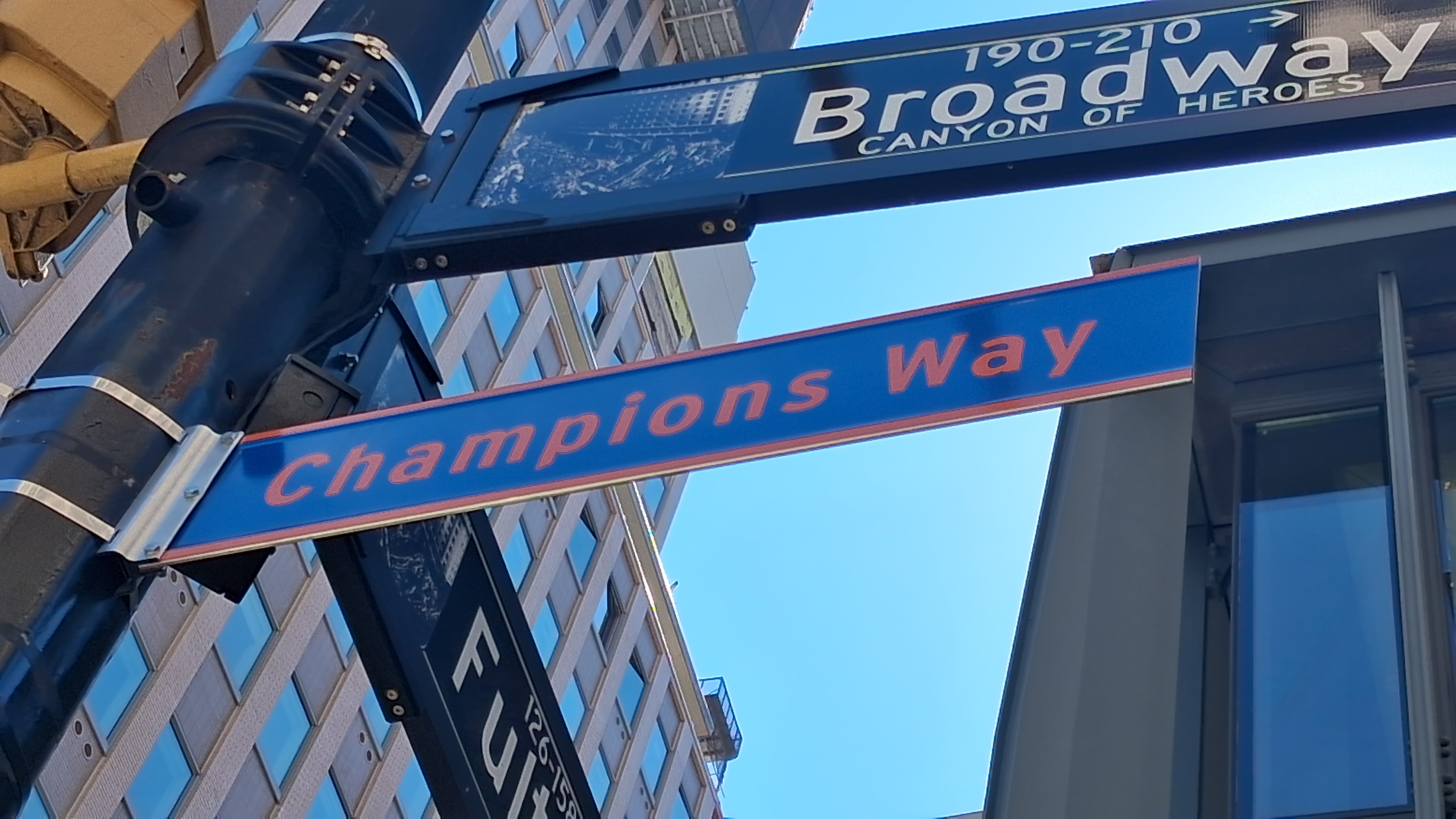
Temporary "Champions Way" street sign after the Knicks' championship win at Broadway in Financial District, Manhattan.

In the first round of the playoffs, the Knicks defeated the Atlanta Hawks in six games, advancing to the conference semifinals for the fourth consecutive year. The series concluded with a record-breaking game where the Knicks set an NBA playoff record for the largest halftime lead (47 points) and a franchise record for the largest playoff margin of victory (51 points). They would later sweep the Philadelphia 76ers in the conference semifinals and the Cleveland Cavaliers in the Eastern Conference finals (New York's second straight appearance) to clinch their first NBA Finals berth since 1999.

The Knicks faced the San Antonio Spurs in the 2026 NBA Finals, which was a rematch of the 1999 Finals and this season's NBA Cup championship game. The Knicks had also won a franchise-record 13 straight playoff games, which stands as the second-longest single-postseason winning streak in NBA history behind only the 2016–17 Golden State Warriors, spanning from a first-round game 4 victory following a 2–1 deficit against the Hawks to a game 3 Finals loss to the Spurs. In game 4 of the Finals, New York achieved the largest comeback in NBA Finals history, in which they overcame a 29-point deficit to beat San Antonio 107–106. The Knicks defeated the Spurs in five games in the NBA Finals to win their first championship since 1973. They also became the first team to win the NBA Cup, win a playoff series, make the Finals, and win the NBA championship in the same season.

== Draft ==
Round	Pick	Player	Position(s)	Nationality	College / club
2	50	Kobe Sanders	SG/SF	United States	Nevada (Sr.)

The Knicks entered the draft with a single second-round pick, which originally belonged to the Memphis Grizzlies. The Knicks acquired the selection from the Oklahoma City Thunder via a 2024 trade; it conveyed as a more favorable pick because Memphis finished with a worse record in the 2024–25 season than the Boston Celtics, the pick's first trade destination before such condition was added. The team had originally held another second-round selection, but it was forfeited due to tampering violations related to the free agency signing of Jalen Brunson in 2022, following three consecutive drafts that each featured only 58 total picks due to various teams—including the Knicks in prior years—being penalized for free agency violations. They had also traded their original 2025 first-round pick to the Brooklyn Nets in 2024 as an exchange for Mikal Bridges.

With the 50th overall pick, the Knicks selected Kobe Sanders, but immediately traded his draft rights to the Los Angeles Clippers in exchange for the draft rights to the 51st pick, Mohamed Diawara, and to Luka Mitrović.

== Roster ==
2025–26 New York Knicks roster
Players

Pos.	No.	Player	Height	Weight	DOB	From
PG	5	Jose Alvarado	6 ft 0 in (1.83 m)	179 lb (81 kg)	1998-04-12	Georgia Tech
PF	8	OG Anunoby	6 ft 7 in (2.01 m)	240 lb (109 kg)	1997-07-17	Indiana
G/F	25	Mikal Bridges	6 ft 6 in (1.98 m)	209 lb (95 kg)	1996-08-30	Villanova
PG	11	Jalen Brunson	6 ft 2 in (1.88 m)	190 lb (86 kg)	1996-08-31	Villanova
G	00	Jordan Clarkson	6 ft 5 in (1.96 m)	194 lb (88 kg)	1992-06-07	Missouri
F	4	Pacôme Dadiet	6 ft 9 in (2.06 m)	210 lb (95 kg)	2005-07-27	France
F	51	Mohamed Diawara	6 ft 9 in (2.06 m)	225 lb (102 kg)	2005-04-29	France
G/F	3	Josh Hart	6 ft 5 in (1.96 m)	215 lb (98 kg)	1995-03-06	Villanova
F/C	55	Ariel Hukporti	7 ft 0 in (2.13 m)	246 lb (112 kg)	2002-04-12	Germany
F/C	50	Trey Jemison (TW)	6 ft 10 in (2.08 m)	270 lb (122 kg)	1999-11-28	UAB
SF	1	Dillon Jones (TW)	6 ft 5 in (1.96 m)	235 lb (107 kg)	2001-10-29	Weber State
PG	13	Tyler Kolek	6 ft 2 in (1.88 m)	195 lb (88 kg)	2001-03-27	Marquette
PG	2	Miles McBride	6 ft 2 in (1.88 m)	195 lb (88 kg)	2000-09-08	West Virginia
G/F	9	Kevin McCullar Jr. (TW)	6 ft 6 in (1.98 m)	210 lb (95 kg)	2001-03-15	Kansas
F/C	23	Mitchell Robinson	7 ft 0 in (2.13 m)	240 lb (109 kg)	1998-04-01	Chalmette HS (LA)
G	44	Landry Shamet	6 ft 5 in (1.96 m)	190 lb (86 kg)	1997-03-13	Wichita State
F	20	Jeremy Sochan	6 ft 8 in (2.03 m)	230 lb (104 kg)	2003-05-20	Baylor
F/C	32	Karl-Anthony Towns	7 ft 0 in (2.13 m)	248 lb (112 kg)	1995-11-15	Kentucky

Coaches
Head coach
- Mike Brown
Assistant(s)
- Charles Allen
- Rick Brunson
- Mark Bryant
- Maurice Cheeks
- Darren Erman
- Riccardo Fois
- Chris Jent (associate HC)
- Billy Lange
- Brendan O'Connor

Legend
- (DP) Unsigned draft pick
- (FA) Free agent
- (S) Suspended
- (GL) On assignment to G League affiliate
- (TW) Two-way affiliate player
- Injured

Roster
Updated: June 14, 2026

== Standings ==
=== Division ===
Atlantic Division	W	L	PCT	GB	Home	Road	Div	GP
y – Boston Celtics	56	26	.683	–	30‍–‍11	26‍–‍15	10‍–‍6	82
x – New York Knicks	53	29	.646	3.0	30‍–‍10	23‍–‍19	14‍–‍3	82
x – Toronto Raptors	46	36	.561	10.0	24‍–‍17	22‍–‍19	5‍–‍12	82
x – Philadelphia 76ers	45	37	.549	11.0	23‍–‍18	22‍–‍19	9‍–‍7	82
Brooklyn Nets	20	62	.244	36.0	12‍–‍29	8‍–‍33	3‍–‍13	82

=== Conference ===
Eastern Conference
#	Team	W	L	PCT	GB	GP
1	c – Detroit Pistons *	60	22	.732	–	82
2	y – Boston Celtics *	56	26	.683	4.0	82
3	x – New York Knicks	53	29	.646	7.0	82
4	x – Cleveland Cavaliers	52	30	.634	8.0	82
5	x – Toronto Raptors	46	36	.561	14.0	82
6	y – Atlanta Hawks *	46	36	.561	14.0	82
7	x – Philadelphia 76ers	45	37	.549	15.0	82
8	x – Orlando Magic	45	37	.549	15.0	82
9	pi – Charlotte Hornets	44	38	.537	16.0	82
10	pi – Miami Heat	43	39	.524	17.0	82
11	Milwaukee Bucks	32	50	.390	28.0	82
12	Chicago Bulls	31	51	.378	29.0	82
13	Brooklyn Nets	20	62	.244	40.0	82
14	Indiana Pacers	19	63	.232	41.0	82
15	Washington Wizards	17	65	.207	43.0	82

== Game log ==
=== Preseason ===
2025 preseason game log
Total: 4–1 (Home: 3–1; Road: 1–0)
Preseason: 4–1 (home: 3–1; road: 1–0)

Game	Date	Team	Score	High points	High rebounds	High assists	Location Attendance	Record
1	October 2	Philadelphia	W 99–84	Miles McBride (12)	Mitchell Robinson (16)	Jalen Brunson (4)	(United Arab Emirates) Etihad Arena; 11,983	1–0
2	October 4	@ Philadelphia	W 112–104	Jalen Brunson (14)	Mitchell Robinson (8)	Tosan Evbuomwan (3)	(United Arab Emirates) Etihad Arena	2–0
3	October 9	Minnesota	W 100–95 (OT)	Mikal Bridges (15)	Karl-Anthony Towns (11)	Brunson, Clarkson, Kolek (3)	Madison Square Garden; 18,344	3–0
4	October 13	Washington	L 103–120	Tyler Kolek (20)	Pacôme Dadiet (6)	Tyler Kolek (6)	Madison Square Garden; 19,241	3–1
5	October 17	Charlotte	W 113–108	Jalen Brunson (31)	Bridges, Brunson, Diawara, Jemison III (7)	Jalen Brunson (6)	Madison Square Garden; 19,270	4–1

2025–26 preseason schedule

=== Regular season ===
2025–26 game log
Total: 53–29 (Home: 30–10; Road: 23–19)
October: 2–3 (home: 2–0; road: 0–3)

Game	Date	Team	Score	High points	High rebounds	High assists	Location Attendance	Record
1	October 22	Cleveland	W 119–111	OG Anunoby (24)	OG Anunoby (14)	Mikal Bridges (6)	Madison Square Garden; 19,812	1–0
2	October 24	Boston	W 105–95	Jalen Brunson (31)	Josh Hart (14)	Jalen Brunson (5)	Madison Square Garden; 19,812	2–0
3	October 26	@ Miami	L 107–115	Jalen Brunson (37)	Karl-Anthony Towns (18)	Jalen Brunson (6)	Kaseya Center; 19,600	2–1
4	October 28	@ Milwaukee	L 111–121	Jalen Brunson (36)	Karl-Anthony Towns (12)	Mikal Bridges (6)	Fiserv Forum; 16,309	2–2
5	October 31	@ Chicago	L 125–135	Jalen Brunson (29)	Mitchell Robinson (11)	Jalen Brunson (7)	United Center; 18,330	2–3

November: 11–3 (home: 8–1; road: 3–2)

Game	Date	Team	Score	High points	High rebounds	High assists	Location Attendance	Record
6	November 2	Chicago	W 128–116	Jalen Brunson (31)	Karl-Anthony Towns (15)	Mikal Bridges (9)	Madison Square Garden; 19,812	3–3
7	November 3	Washington	W 119–102	Karl-Anthony Towns (33)	Karl-Anthony Towns (13)	Jalen Brunson (9)	Madison Square Garden; 19,812	4–3
8	November 5	Minnesota	W 137–114	OG Anunoby (25)	Robinson, Towns (10)	Jalen Brunson (10)	Madison Square Garden; 19,812	5–3
9	November 9	Brooklyn	W 134–98	Karl-Anthony Towns (28)	Karl-Anthony Towns (12)	Jalen Brunson (7)	Madison Square Garden; 19,812	6–3
10	November 11	Memphis	W 133–120	Jalen Brunson (32)	Karl-Anthony Towns (13)	Jalen Brunson (10)	Madison Square Garden; 19,812	7–3
11	November 12	Orlando	L 107–124	Jalen Brunson (31)	Karl-Anthony Towns (12)	Jalen Brunson (6)	Madison Square Garden; 19,812	7–4
12	November 14	Miami	W 140–132	Karl-Anthony Towns (39)	Josh Hart (12)	Josh Hart (10)	Madison Square Garden; 19,812	8–4
13	November 17	@ Miami	L 113–115	Miles McBride (25)	Karl-Anthony Towns (15)	Josh Hart (9)	Kaseya Center; 19,600	8–5
14	November 19	@ Dallas	W 113–111	Jalen Brunson (28)	Karl-Anthony Towns (14)	Bridges, Towns (6)	American Airlines Center; 18,513	9–5
15	November 22	@ Orlando	L 121–133	Jalen Brunson (33)	Karl-Anthony Towns (8)	Jalen Brunson (11)	Kia Center; 18,014	9–6
16	November 24	@ Brooklyn	W 113–100	Karl-Anthony Towns (37)	Hart, Towns (12)	Josh Hart (7)	Barclays Center; 18,019	10–6
17	November 26	@ Charlotte	W 129–101	Jalen Brunson (33)	Karl-Anthony Towns (10)	Josh Hart (7)	Spectrum Center; 19,588	11–6
18	November 28	Milwaukee	W 118–109	Jalen Brunson (37)	Jalen Brunson (15)	Josh Hart (7)	Madison Square Garden; 19,812	12–6
19	November 30	Toronto	W 116–94	Karl-Anthony Towns (22)	Mitchell Robinson (15)	Brunson, Hart (7)	Madison Square Garden; 19,812	13–6

December: 10–4 (home: 5–1; road: 5–3)

Game	Date	Team	Score	High points	High rebounds	High assists	Location Attendance	Record
20	December 2	@ Boston	L 117–123	Mikal Bridges (35)	Hart, Towns (7)	Jalen Brunson (11)	TD Garden; 19,156	13–7
21	December 3	Charlotte	W 119–104	Karl-Anthony Towns (35)	Karl-Anthony Towns (18)	Josh Hart (8)	Madison Square Garden; 19,812	14–7
22	December 5	Utah	W 146–112	Jalen Brunson (33)	Karl-Anthony Towns (9)	Josh Hart (6)	Madison Square Garden; 19,812	15–7
23	December 7	Orlando	W 106–100	Jalen Brunson (30)	Mitchell Robinson (13)	Jalen Brunson (9)	Madison Square Garden; 19,812	16–7
24	December 9	@ Toronto	W 117–101	Jalen Brunson (35)	Karl-Anthony Towns (16)	Tied (4)	Scotiabank Arena; 17,801	17–7
25	December 13	@ Orlando (in Las Vegas)	W 132–120	Jalen Brunson (40)	Mitchell Robinson (9)	Jalen Brunson (8)	T-Mobile Arena; 16,697	18–7
Cup	December 16	San Antonio (in Las Vegas)	W 124–113	OG Anunoby (28)	Mitchell Robinson (15)	Jalen Brunson (8)	T-Mobile Arena; 18,609	–
26	December 18	@ Indiana	W 114–113	Jalen Brunson (25)	Mikal Bridges (8)	Tyler Kolek (11)	Gainbridge Fieldhouse; 15,660	19–7
27	December 19	Philadelphia	L 107–116	Brunson, Towns (22)	Mitchell Robinson (16)	Jalen Brunson (9)	Madison Square Garden; 19,812	19–8
28	December 21	Miami	W 132–125	Jalen Brunson (47)	Josh Hart (10)	Jalen Brunson (8)	Madison Square Garden; 19,812	20–8
29	December 23	@ Minnesota	L 104–115	Karl-Anthony Towns (40)	Josh Hart (15)	Hart, Kolek (8)	Target Center; 18,978	20–9
30	December 25	Cleveland	W 126–124	Jalen Brunson (34)	Karl-Anthony Towns (14)	Tyler Kolek (9)	Madison Square Garden; 19,812	21–9
31	December 27	@ Atlanta	W 128–125	Karl-Anthony Towns (36)	Karl-Anthony Towns (16)	Mikal Bridges (8)	State Farm Arena; 17,809	22–9
32	December 29	@ New Orleans	W 130–125	Jalen Brunson (28)	Karl-Anthony Towns (12)	Bridges, Brunson (10)	Smoothie King Center; 17,041	23–9
33	December 31	@ San Antonio	L 132–134	Jalen Brunson (29)	Karl-Anthony Towns (7)	Jalen Brunson (8)	Frost Bank Center; 18,602	23–10

January: 7–8 (home: 4–4; road: 3–4)

Game	Date	Team	Score	High points	High rebounds	High assists	Location Attendance	Record
34	January 2	Atlanta	L 99–111	Jalen Brunson (24)	Ariel Hukporti (16)	Kevin McCullar Jr. (6)	Madison Square Garden; 19,812	23–11
35	January 3	Philadelphia	L 119–130	Jalen Brunson (31)	Karl-Anthony Towns (14)	Anunoby, Bridges (6)	Madison Square Garden; 19,390	23–12
36	January 5	@ Detroit	L 90–121	Jalen Brunson (25)	Mitchell Robinson (10)	Kevin McCullar Jr. (3)	Little Caesars Arena; 20,032	23–13
37	January 7	L.A. Clippers	W 123–111	Jalen Brunson (26)	Karl-Anthony Towns (11)	Brunson, Towns (7)	Madison Square Garden; 19,812	24–13
38	January 9	@ Phoenix	L 107–112	Jalen Brunson (27)	Mitchell Robinson (14)	Brunson, Towns (5)	Mortgage Matchup Center; 17,071	24–14
39	January 11	@ Portland	W 123–114	Jalen Brunson (26)	Robinson, Towns (11)	Jalen Brunson (8)	Moda Center; 17,867	25–14
40	January 14	@ Sacramento	L 101–112	Mikal Bridges (19)	Mitchell Robinson (11)	Miles McBride (6)	Golden 1 Center; 15,095	25–15
41	January 15	@ Golden State	L 113–126	Anunoby, McBride (25)	Karl-Anthony Towns (20)	Josh Hart (10)	Chase Center; 18,064	25–16
42	January 17	Phoenix	L 99–106	McBride, Towns (23)	Karl-Anthony Towns (11)	Anunoby, McBride (5)	Madison Square Garden; 19,812	25–17
43	January 19	Dallas	L 97–114	Brunson, Towns (22)	Karl-Anthony Towns (18)	Jalen Brunson (6)	Madison Square Garden; 19,812	25–18
44	January 21	Brooklyn	W 120–66	Jalen Brunson (20)	Josh Hart (9)	Jalen Brunson (5)	Madison Square Garden; 19,812	26–18
45	January 24	@ Philadelphia	W 112–109	Jalen Brunson (31)	Josh Hart (13)	Josh Hart (7)	Xfinity Mobile Arena; 19,746	27–18
46	January 27	Sacramento	W 103–87	Jalen Brunson (28)	Mitchell Robinson (13)	Mikal Bridges (5)	Madison Square Garden; 19,812	28–18
47	January 28	@ Toronto	W 119–92	Mikal Bridges (30)	Karl-Anthony Towns (22)	Tyler Kolek (10)	Scotiabank Arena; 19,511	29–18
48	January 30	Portland	W 127–97	Jalen Brunson (26)	Karl-Anthony Towns (20)	Bridges, Hart (5)	Madison Square Garden; 19,812	30–18

February: 8–4 (home: 3–2; road: 5–2)

Game	Date	Team	Score	High points	High rebounds	High assists	Location Attendance	Record
49	February 1	L.A. Lakers	W 112–100	OG Anunoby (25)	Karl-Anthony Towns (13)	Jalen Brunson (13)	Madison Square Garden; 19,812	31–18
50	February 3	@ Washington	W 132–101	Mikal Bridges (23)	Karl-Anthony Towns (15)	Josh Hart (7)	Capital One Arena; 17,822	32–18
51	February 4	Denver	W 134–127 (2OT)	Jalen Brunson (42)	Karl-Anthony Towns (12)	Jalen Brunson (9)	Madison Square Garden; 19,812	33–18
52	February 6	@ Detroit	L 80–118	Mikal Bridges (19)	Ariel Hukporti (7)	Jordan Clarkson (5)	Little Caesars Arena; 20,062	33–19
53	February 8	@ Boston	W 111–89	Jalen Brunson (31)	Karl-Anthony Towns (10)	Jalen Brunson (8)	TD Garden; 19,156	34–19
54	February 10	Indiana	L 134–137 (OT)	Jalen Brunson (40)	Karl-Anthony Towns (14)	Josh Hart (11)	Madison Square Garden; 19,812	34–20
55	February 11	@ Philadelphia	W 138–89	Jose Alvarado (26)	Karl-Anthony Towns (11)	Josh Hart (9)	Xfinity Mobile Arena; 19,746	35–20
All-Star Game
56	February 19	Detroit	L 111–126	Jalen Brunson (33)	Karl-Anthony Towns (11)	Jalen Brunson (8)	Madison Square Garden; 19,812	35–21
57	February 21	Houston	W 108–106	Karl-Anthony Towns (25)	Karl-Anthony Towns (7)	Brunson, Hart (6)	Madison Square Garden; 19,812	36–21
58	February 22	@ Chicago	W 105–99	Karl-Anthony Towns (28)	Karl-Anthony Towns (11)	Jalen Brunson (9)	United Center; 19,628	37–21
59	February 24	@ Cleveland	L 94–109	Jalen Brunson (20)	Mitchell Robinson (16)	Josh Hart (5)	Rocket Arena; 19,432	37–22
60	February 27	@ Milwaukee	W 127–98	Jalen Brunson (27)	Karl-Anthony Towns (13)	Mikal Bridges (6)	Fiserv Forum; 17,341	38–22

March: 10–6 (home: 5–1; road: 5–5)

Game	Date	Team	Score	High points	High rebounds	High assists	Location Attendance	Record
61	March 1	San Antonio	W 114–89	Mikal Bridges (25)	Karl-Anthony Towns (14)	Brunson, Hart (7)	Madison Square Garden; 19,812	39–22
62	March 3	@ Toronto	W 111–95	Jalen Brunson (26)	Karl-Anthony Towns (12)	Jalen Brunson (10)	Scotiabank Arena; 19,800	40–22
63	March 4	Oklahoma City	L 100–103	Karl-Anthony Towns (17)	Karl-Anthony Towns (17)	Jalen Brunson (15)	Madison Square Garden; 19,812	40–23
64	March 6	@ Denver	W 142–103	OG Anunoby (34)	Karl-Anthony Towns (13)	Jalen Brunson (15)	Ball Arena; 19,807	41–23
65	March 8	@ L.A. Lakers	L 97–110	Karl-Anthony Towns (25)	Karl-Anthony Towns (16)	Jalen Brunson (7)	Crypto.com Arena; 18,997	41–24
66	March 9	@ L.A. Clippers	L 118–126	Karl-Anthony Towns (35)	Josh Hart (13)	Jalen Brunson (8)	Intuit Dome; 17,927	41–25
67	March 11	@ Utah	W 134–117	Jalen Brunson (28)	Mitchell Robinson (13)	Jalen Brunson (8)	Delta Center; 18,186	42–25
68	March 13	@ Indiana	W 101–92	Jalen Brunson (29)	Mitchell Robinson (22)	Jalen Brunson (9)	Gainbridge Fieldhouse; 15,544	43–25
69	March 15	Golden State	W 110–107	Jalen Brunson (30)	Hart, Towns (12)	Jalen Brunson (9)	Madison Square Garden; 19,812	44–25
70	March 17	Indiana	W 136–110	Josh Hart (33)	Karl-Anthony Towns (11)	Jose Alvarado (10)	Madison Square Garden; 19,812	45–25
71	March 20	@ Brooklyn	W 93–92	Karl-Anthony Towns (26)	Karl-Anthony Towns (15)	Jalen Brunson (8)	Barclays Center; 18,017	46–25
72	March 22	Washington	W 145–113	Karl-Anthony Towns (26)	Karl-Anthony Towns (16)	Jose Alvarado (8)	Madison Square Garden; 19,812	47–25
73	March 24	New Orleans	W 121–116	Jalen Brunson (32)	Karl-Anthony Towns (14)	Bridges, Brunson (7)	Madison Square Garden; 19,812	48–25
74	March 26	@ Charlotte	L 103–114	Jalen Brunson (26)	Josh Hart (7)	Jalen Brunson (13)	Spectrum Center; 19,625	48–26
75	March 29	@ Oklahoma City	L 100–111	Jalen Brunson (32)	Karl-Anthony Towns (18)	Jalen Brunson (5)	Paycom Center; 18,203	48–27
76	March 31	@ Houston	L 94–111	Karl-Anthony Towns (22)	Karl-Anthony Towns (8)	Jalen Brunson (8)	Toyota Center; 18,055	48–28

April: 5–1 (home: 3–1; road: 2–0)

Game	Date	Team	Score	High points	High rebounds	High assists	Location Attendance	Record
77	April 1	@ Memphis	W 130–119	OG Anunoby (25)	OG Anunoby (13)	Karl-Anthony Towns (11)	FedExForum; 15,181	49–28
78	April 3	Chicago	W 136–96	OG Anunoby (31)	Hart, Robinson (11)	Jalen Brunson (10)	Madison Square Garden; 19,812	50–28
79	April 6	@ Atlanta	W 108–105	Jalen Brunson (30)	Robinson, Towns (12)	Jalen Brunson (13)	State Farm Arena; 17,242	51–28
80	April 9	Boston	W 112–106	Josh Hart (26)	Karl-Anthony Towns (12)	Jalen Brunson (10)	Madison Square Garden; 19,812	52–28
81	April 10	Toronto	W 112–95	Jalen Brunson (29)	Karl-Anthony Towns (10)	Karl-Anthony Towns (5)	Madison Square Garden; 19,812	53–28
82	April 12	Charlotte	L 96–110	Miles McBride (21)	Ariel Hukporti (9)	Jose Alvarado (7)	Madison Square Garden; 19,812	53–29

2025–26 season schedule

=== Playoffs ===
2026 playoff game log
Total: 16–3 (home: 7–2; road: 9–1)
First round: 4–2 (home: 2–1; road: 2–1)

Game	Date	Team	Score	High points	High rebounds	High assists	Location Attendance	Series
1	April 18	Atlanta	W 113–102	Jalen Brunson (28)	Josh Hart (14)	Jalen Brunson (7)	Madison Square Garden; 19,812	1–0
2	April 20	Atlanta	L 106–107	Jalen Brunson (29)	Josh Hart (13)	Jalen Brunson (7)	Madison Square Garden; 19,812	1–1
3	April 23	@ Atlanta	L 108–109	OG Anunoby (29)	Karl-Anthony Towns (17)	Josh Hart (6)	State Farm Arena; 18,452	1–2
4	April 25	@ Atlanta	W 114–98	OG Anunoby (22)	Anunoby, Towns (10)	Karl-Anthony Towns (10)	State Farm Arena; 18,763	2–2
5	April 28	Atlanta	W 126–97	Jalen Brunson (39)	Karl-Anthony Towns (14)	Jalen Brunson (8)	Madison Square Garden; 19,812	3–2
6	April 30	@ Atlanta	W 140–89	OG Anunoby (29)	Karl-Anthony Towns (11)	Karl-Anthony Towns (10)	State Farm Arena; 17,685	4–2

Conference semifinals: 4–0 (home: 2–0; road: 2–0)

Game	Date	Team	Score	High points	High rebounds	High assists	Location Attendance	Series
1	May 4	Philadelphia	W 137–98	Jalen Brunson (35)	Ariel Hukporti (9)	Hart, Towns (6)	Madison Square Garden; 19,812	1–0
2	May 6	Philadelphia	W 108–102	Jalen Brunson (26)	Karl-Anthony Towns (10)	Karl-Anthony Towns (7)	Madison Square Garden; 19,812	2–0
3	May 8	@ Philadelphia	W 108–94	Jalen Brunson (33)	Karl-Anthony Towns (12)	Jalen Brunson (9)	Xfinity Mobile Arena; 19,746	3–0
4	May 10	@ Philadelphia	W 144–114	Miles McBride (25)	Josh Hart (9)	Karl-Anthony Towns (10)	Xfinity Mobile Arena; 19,746	4–0

Conference finals: 4–0 (home: 2–0; road: 2–0)

Game	Date	Team	Score	High points	High rebounds	High assists	Location Attendance	Series
1	May 19	Cleveland	W 115–104 (OT)	Jalen Brunson (38)	Karl-Anthony Towns (13)	Jalen Brunson (6)	Madison Square Garden; 19,812	1–0
2	May 21	Cleveland	W 109–93	Josh Hart (26)	Karl-Anthony Towns (13)	Jalen Brunson (14)	Madison Square Garden; 19,812	2–0
3	May 23	@ Cleveland	W 121–108	Jalen Brunson (30)	Josh Hart (9)	Karl-Anthony Towns (7)	Rocket Arena; 19,432	3–0
4	May 25	@ Cleveland	W 130–93	Karl-Anthony Towns (19)	Karl-Anthony Towns (14)	Josh Hart (6)	Rocket Arena; 19,432	4–0

NBA Finals: 4–1 (home: 1–1; road: 3–0)

Game	Date	Team	Score	High points	High rebounds	High assists	Location Attendance	Series
1	June 3	@ San Antonio	W 105–95	Jalen Brunson (30)	Josh Hart (15)	Josh Hart (6)	Frost Bank Center; 18,835	1–0
2	June 5	@ San Antonio	W 105–104	Karl-Anthony Towns (21)	Karl-Anthony Towns (13)	Bridges, Brunson (6)	Frost Bank Center; 19,014	2–0
3	June 8	San Antonio	L 111–115	Jalen Brunson (32)	Josh Hart (9)	Jalen Brunson (5)	Madison Square Garden; 19,812	2–1
4	June 10	San Antonio	W 107–106	Jalen Brunson (36)	Karl-Anthony Towns (10)	Jalen Brunson (7)	Madison Square Garden; 19,812	3–1
5	June 13	@ San Antonio	W 94–90	Jalen Brunson (45)	Josh Hart (11)	Mikal Bridges (4)	Frost Bank Center; 18,984	4–1

2026 playoff schedule

=== NBA Cup ===
==== East Group C ====
Pos	Team	Pld	W	L	PF	PA	PD	Qualification
1	New York Knicks	4	3	1	512	477	+35	Advanced to knockout rounds
2	Miami Heat	4	3	1	507	458	+49	Advanced to knockout rounds
3	Milwaukee Bucks	4	2	2	467	463	+4	
4	Charlotte Hornets	4	1	3	461	500	−39	
5	Chicago Bulls	4	1	3	468	517	−49	

Source: NBA

== Player statistics ==
Legend
GP	Games played	GS	Games started	MPG	Minutes per game
FG%	Field-goal percentage	3P%	3-point field-goal percentage	FT%	Free-throw percentage
RPG	Rebounds per game	APG	Assists per game	SPG	Steals per game
BPG	Blocks per game	PPG	Points per game

=== Regular season ===
New York Knicks statistics
Player	GP	GS	MPG	FG%	3P%	FT%	RPG	APG	SPG	BPG	PPG
Jose Alvarado†	28	3	16.9	.414	.330	.682	2.0	3.8	1.0	.1	6.6
OG Anunoby	67	67	33.2	.484	.386	.828	5.2	2.2	1.6	.7	16.7
Mikal Bridges	82	82	32.8	.490	.371	.827	3.8	3.7	1.3	.8	14.4
Jalen Brunson	74	74	35.0	.467	.369	.841	3.3	6.8	.8	.1	26.0
Jordan Clarkson	72	1	17.8	.451	.327	.830	1.8	1.3	.4	.1	8.6
Pacôme Dadiet	29	0	4.7	.333	.219	.818	.9	.4	.1	.0	1.7
Mohamed Diawara	69	7	9.2	.423	.369	.750	1.4	.8	.2	.1	3.6
Tosan Evbuomwan	5	0	1.6	.000	—	—	.4	.0	.0	.0	.0
Josh Hart	66	52	30.2	.508	.413	.720	7.4	4.8	1.1	.3	12.0
Ariel Hukporti	54	5	9.2	.563	.250	.788	2.9	.5	.2	.5	2.2
Trey Jemison III	13	0	6.3	.600	—	1.000	1.4	.4	.1	.2	1.0
Dillon Jones	7	0	5.6	.222	.200	1.000	1.0	.6	.4	.0	1.3
Tyler Kolek	62	1	11.7	.435	.386	.700	1.6	2.7	.4	.1	4.4
Miles McBride	41	15	26.3	.423	.413	.787	2.4	2.6	.9	.2	12.0
Kevin McCullar Jr.	21	0	7.4	.426	.333	.400	1.3	1.0	.4	.0	2.4
Mitchell Robinson	60	16	19.6	.723	—	.408	8.8	.9	.9	1.2	5.1
Landry Shamet	51	12	23.0	.437	.392	.711	1.8	1.4	.6	.2	9.3
Jeremy Sochan†	16	0	6.9	.567	.200	.800	2.1	.8	.4	.1	2.8
Karl-Anthony Towns	75	75	31.0	.501	.368	.858	11.9	3.9	.9	.5	20.1
Guerschon Yabusele†	41	0	8.9	.393	.294	.667	2.1	.4	.1	.1	2.7

=== Playoffs ===
New York Knicks statistics
Player	GP	GS	MPG	FG%	3P%	FT%	RPG	APG	SPG	BPG	PPG
Jose Alvarado	18	0	9.4	.433	.353	.833	1.4	1.2	.6	.1	4.2
OG Anunoby	17	17	34.5	.561	.489	.854	6.3	1.6	1.5	1.1	20.1
Mikal Bridges	19	19	32.0	.559	.365	.920	3.2	2.7	1.0	.3	13.5
Jalen Brunson	19	19	36.9	.465	.363	.846	3.2	6.1	1.2	.0	28.4
Jordan Clarkson	18	0	10.8	.455	.211	.789	1.7	.6	.2	.1	4.9
Pacôme Dadiet	7	0	5.7	.500	.375	.500	1.0	.4	.3	.0	2.9
Mohamed Diawara	6	0	7.1	.231	.167	—	1.5	1.0	.2	.0	1.2
Josh Hart	19	19	32.3	.431	.326	.606	8.9	4.6	1.7	.2	10.4
Ariel Hukporti	10	0	7.6	.455	.000	.467	3.2	.3	.2	.7	1.7
Tyler Kolek	8	0	6.7	.440	.444	1.000	.8	1.5	.0	.1	3.5
Miles McBride	19	2	17.6	.333	.375	.875	1.2	1.2	.4	.2	5.6
Mitchell Robinson	18	0	13.9	.673	—	.293	5.5	.4	.4	.6	4.8
Landry Shamet	19	0	16.3	.453	.475	.778	1.1	.7	.2	.1	6.0
Jeremy Sochan	8	0	3.2	.778	.500	.625	.6	.3	.1	.1	2.5
Karl-Anthony Towns	19	19	30.4	.551	.456	.909	10.6	4.9	1.3	1.3	15.9

- † Denotes player spent time with another team in the season. Stats reflect time with the Knicks only.

== Transactions ==
=== Trades ===
June 26, 2025
To Los Angeles Clippers

Draft rights to Kobe Sanders (No. 50)
To New York Knicks

Draft rights to Mohamed Diawara (No. 51)
Draft rights to Luka Mitrović (2015 No. 60)
February 5, 2026
To Chicago Bulls

Guerschon Yabusele
Cash considerations
To New York Knicks

Dalen Terry
February 5, 2026
To New Orleans Pelicans

Dalen Terry
2026 second-round pick
2027 second-round pick
Cash considerations

To New York Knicks

Jose Alvarado
Draft rights to Latavious Williams (2010 No. 48)

=== Free agency ===
==== Additions ====
Date	Player	Former Team	Ref.
July 7	Jordan Clarkson	Utah Jazz	
July 7	Guerschon Yabusele	Philadelphia 76ers	
