= Miles McBride =

American basketball player (born 2000)

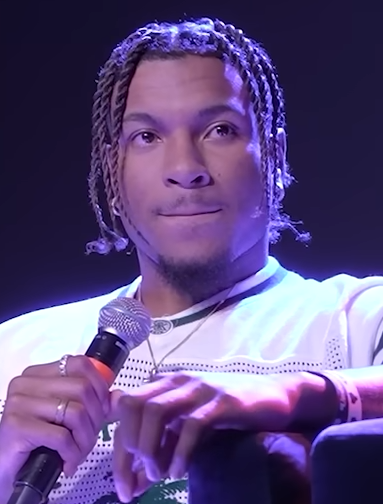
- McBride in 2025

No. 2 – New York Knicks
- Position: Point guard / shooting guard
- League: NBA

Personal information
- Born: September 8, 2000 (age 26) Cincinnati, Ohio, U.S.
- Listed height: 6 ft 2 in (1.88 m)
- Listed weight: 195 lb (88 kg)

Career information
- High school: Moeller (Cincinnati, Ohio)
- College: West Virginia (2019–2021)
- NBA draft: 2021: 2nd round, 36th overall pick
- Drafted by: Oklahoma City Thunder
- Playing career: 2021–present

Career history
- 2021–present: New York Knicks
- 2021–2023: →Westchester Knicks

Career highlights
- NBA champion (2026); NBA Cup champion (2025); Second-team All-Big 12 (2021); Big 12 All-Freshman Team (2020)
- Stats at NBA.com
- Stats at Basketball Reference

Miles James "Deuce" McBride (born September 8, 2000) is an American professional basketball player for the New York Knicks of the National Basketball Association (NBA). He played college basketball for the West Virginia Mountaineers.

McBride was selected with the 36th overall pick in the second round of the 2021 NBA draft by the Oklahoma City Thunder, but was traded to the Knicks on draft night. He won an NBA championship with the Knicks in 2026. He plays both the point and shooting guard positions.

== High school career ==
McBride was a two-sport athlete at Moeller High School in Cincinnati, Ohio, playing basketball and football as a quarterback. He played alongside teammate Jaxson Hayes from 2015 to 2018. As a sophomore, he averaged 10.5 points, 2.5 assists, and 1.8 steals per game for the Division I state runners-up in basketball. He suffered a season-ending left foot injury during a football game as a junior. McBride was sidelined from all but the final two games of the basketball season and helped Moeller win the Division I state title. He opted out of playing football in his senior season to focus on basketball. As a senior, McBride averaged 13.8 points, 5.3 rebounds and 4.1 assists per game, leading Moeller to a 29–0 record and another Division I state championship. His team achieved the first undefeated season in its division since 1995. A three-star recruit, he committed to playing college basketball for West Virginia.

== College career ==
On November 8, 2019, McBride made his debut for West Virginia, recording 11 points, six rebounds, four assists and four steals in a 94–84 win over Akron. On December 29, he scored 21 points in a 67–59 win against Ohio State. On January 11, 2020, McBride scored a freshman season-high 22 points in a 66–54 victory over Texas Tech. As a freshman, McBride averaged 9.5 points and 2.4 rebounds per game while shooting 40.2 percent from the field, mostly coming off the bench. He was named to the Big 12 All-Freshman Team.

In his sophomore season debut on November 25, 2020, McBride scored 23 points in a 79–71 win over South Dakota State. On February 6, 2021, he posted 29 points, eight assists and seven rebounds in a 91–79 win against Kansas. In the first round of the NCAA tournament, McBride recorded a career-high 30 points, six rebounds and six assists in an 84–67 victory over Morehead State. As a sophomore, he averaged 15.9 points, 4.8 assists, 3.9 rebounds and 1.9 steals per game, earning Second Team All-Big 12 honors. On April 2, McBride declared for the 2021 NBA draft while maintaining his college eligibility. He later decided to remain in the draft, foregoing his college eligibility.

== Professional career ==
=== New York Knicks (2021–present) ===
McBride was selected in the second round of the 2021 NBA draft with the 36th pick by the Oklahoma City Thunder and then traded to the New York Knicks, alongside Rokas Jokubaitis, for Jeremiah Robinson-Earl. On August 6, 2021, the Knicks announced that they had signed McBride. Through the 2021 NBA Summer League, McBride averaged 15.1 points, 3.5 rebounds, 3.5 assists, and 1.9 steals per game. He made his regular season debut on October 24. On February 1, 2022, McBride was assigned to the Westchester Knicks, and he scored 39 points in a 117–107 win over the Delaware Blue Coats.

On December 30, 2023, the Knicks announced they had signed McBride to a contract extension, which was reported to be for three years and $13 million. With the trade of guards RJ Barrett and Immanuel Quickley, a spot was cleared for McBride to be a permanent fixture in the Knicks rotation. On March 18, 2024, McBride started in place of an injured OG Anunoby, recording a career–high 29 points, a career-high six three-pointers in a career-high 47 minutes as the Knicks defeated the Golden State Warriors on the road, 119–112. On March 23, McBride played in all 48 minutes of the Knicks' victory over the Brooklyn Nets, joining his teammate Josh Hart as the only players to not be subbed out of a game during the 2023–24 season. In 68 games (14 starts) for the team, he averaged 8.3 points, 1.5 rebounds, and 1.7 assists, all of which were career-highs.

McBride made 64 appearances (including 10 starts) for New York in the 2024–25 NBA season, recording averages of 9.5 points, 2.5 rebounds, and 2.9 assists.

On February 5, 2026, it was announced that McBride would be out indefinitely due to requiring surgery to repair a core muscle injury. He played in 41 games (15 starts) for the Knicks in the regular season, averaging a career-high 12.0 points, 2.4 rebounds, and 2.6 assists. In Game 5 of the NBA Finals, McBride helped the Knicks achieve a 94–90 win and close out the NBA Finals against the San Antonio Spurs, 4–1, securing the Knicks' first NBA championship in 53 years. In the 2026 NBA playoffs, McBride appeared in 19 games, averaging 5.6 points, 1.2 rebounds, and 1.2 assists per game.

== Career statistics ==
Legend
GP	Games played	GS	Games started	MPG	Minutes per game
FG%	Field goal percentage	3P%	3-point field goal percentage	FT%	Free throw percentage
RPG	Rebounds per game	APG	Assists per game	SPG	Steals per game
BPG	Blocks per game	PPG	Points per game	**Bold**	Career high
†	Won an NBA championship

=== NBA ===
==== Regular season ====
Year	Team	GP	GS	MPG	FG%	3P%	FT%	RPG	APG	SPG	BPG	PPG
2021–22	New York	40	2	9.3	.296	.250	.667	1.1	1.0	.4	.0	2.2
2022–23	New York	64	2	11.9	.358	.299	.667	.8	1.1	.6	.1	3.5
2023–24	New York	**68**	14	19.5	**.452**	.410	**.860**	1.5	1.7	.7	.1	8.3
2024–25	New York	64	10	24.9	.406	.369	.813	**2.5**	**2.9**	**1.0**	**.3**	9.5
2025–26†	New York	41	**15**	**26.3**	.423	**.413**	.787	2.4	2.6	.8	.2	**12.0**
Career		277	43	18.5	.409	.374	.781	1.6	1.9	.7	.2	7.1

==== Playoffs ====
Year	Team	GP	GS	MPG	FG%	3P%	FT%	RPG	APG	SPG	BPG	PPG
2023	New York	8	0	2.5	.250	.333	—	.3	.1	.0	.1	.4
2024	New York	13	**2**	**26.7**	**.435**	.368	.833	**2.2**	**1.9**	**.5**	**.2**	**11.0**
2025	New York	18	0	18.9	.378	.373	.824	1.2	1.0	.4	.1	5.8
2026†	New York	**19**	**2**	17.6	.333	**.375**	**.875**	1.2	1.2	.4	**.2**	5.6
Career		58	4	18.0	.384	.371	.838	1.3	1.2	.4	.2	6.2

=== College ===
Year	Team	GP	GS	MPG	FG%	3P%	FT%	RPG	APG	SPG	BPG	PPG
2019–20	West Virginia	**31**	2	22.2	.402	.304	.747	2.4	1.8	1.1	**.5**	9.5
2020–21	West Virginia	29	**28**	**34.2**	**.431**	**.414**	**.813**	**3.9**	**4.8**	**1.9**	.3	**15.9**
Career		60	30	28.0	.419	.368	.785	3.1	3.3	1.5	.4	12.6

== Personal life ==
McBride is the son of Walt and Kim McBride. His father played basketball for Xavier, while his mother played tennis for Ohio State. McBride's older brother, Trey, is playing basketball for the Itzehoe Eagles in Germany. He has been nicknamed "Deuce" since he was in third grade.
