= Pacôme Dadiet =

French basketball player (born 2005)

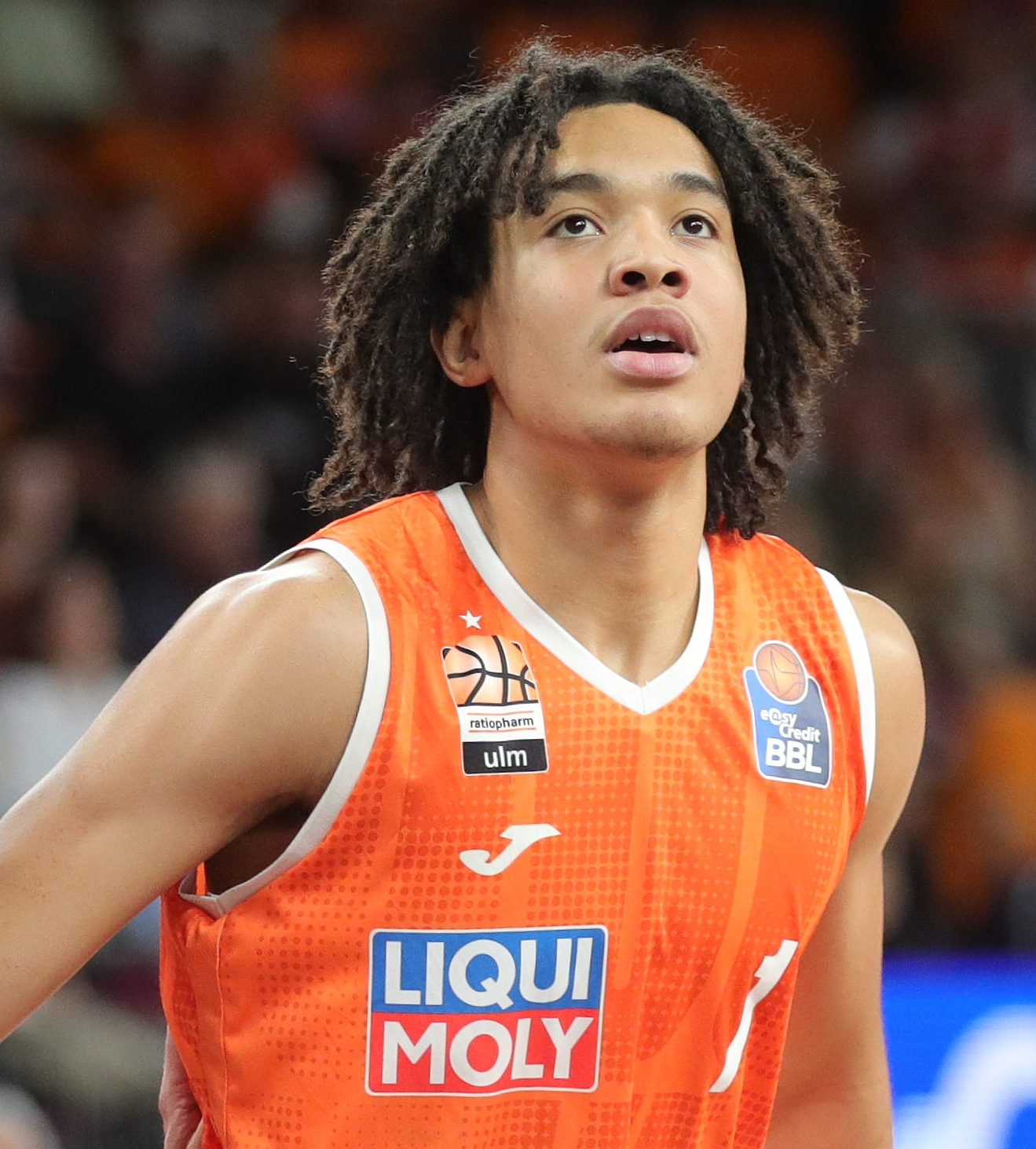
- Dadiet with Ratiopharm Ulm in 2023

No. 4 – New York Knicks
- Position: Small forward
- League: NBA

Personal information
- Born: 27 July 2005 (age 21) Aubagne, France
- Listed height: 6 ft 9 in (2.06 m)
- Listed weight: 210 lb (95 kg)

Career information
- NBA draft: 2024: 1st round, 25th overall pick
- Drafted by: New York Knicks
- Playing career: 2021–present

Career history
- 2021–2022: Paris Basketball
- 2023: OrangeAcademy
- 2023–2024: Ratiopharm Ulm
- 2024–present: New York Knicks
- 2024–2026: →Westchester Knicks

Career highlights
- NBA champion (2026); NBA Cup champion (2025)
- Stats at NBA.com
- Stats at Basketball Reference
Medals
Men's basketball
Representing France
FIBA U17 World Cup
Bronze medal – third place	2022 Spain	Team

Pacôme Djenon Dadiet (born 27 July 2005) is a French professional basketball player for the New York Knicks of the National Basketball Association (NBA). He previously played for Paris Basketball and Ratiopharm Ulm.

== Early life and career ==
Dadiet was born on 27 July 2005 and is of Ivorian descent. As a youth, he joined the club Saint-Charles Charenton in 2011, where he remained through 2020 and was teammates with players such as Tidjane Salaün. He then spent time with the youth team of Centre Fédéral de Basket-ball, before joining the youth program of Paris Basketball. He appeared in 22 matches for the club's Under-21 team in the 2021–22 season, averaging 17.3 points, 5.2 rebounds and 1.7 assists per game.

== Professional career ==
=== Paris Basketball (2021–2022) ===
Dadiet made his LNB Pro A debut for Paris Basketball's first team in October 2021, at the age of 16, scoring seven points in eight minutes of playing time. He played in eight games throughout the 2021–22 season for the main squad.

=== Ratiopharm Ulm (2023–2024) ===
Dadiet sought to leave Paris and join German club Ratiopharm Ulm in 2022, but was involved in a contractual dispute which did not allow him to join them until January 2023. During the 2022–23 season, he played for Ulm's developmental team, OrangeAcademy, in the German third tier, averaging 16 points and 4.2 rebounds per game. He also featured in one game for the first team, playing three minutes.

He became a regular starter for Ulm's senior side during the 2023–24 season, and was viewed as a potential NBA prospect.

=== New York / Westchester Knicks (2024–present) ===
On 2 May 2024, the NBA confirmed that Dadiet was one of the international players who had declared for the 2024 NBA draft. On 26 June, Dadiet was selected with the 25th overall pick by the New York Knicks in the draft. He was one of the four French players drafted during the first round, following Zaccharie Risacher, Alexandre Sarr and Salaün. On 5 July, Dadiet signed with the Knicks.

Dadiet made his NBA debut on 22 October, in a 132–109 loss to the Boston Celtics, scoring three points. Throughout his rookie season, he was assigned several times to the Westchester Knicks.

On 13 June 2026, Dadiet and the Knicks won the 2026 NBA Finals, beating the San Antonio Spurs 4–1.

== National team career ==
Dadiet represented France at the 2021 FIBA U16 European Challengers, where he played five games and averaged six points and 1.4 rebounds. He later participated at the 2022 FIBA Under-17 Basketball World Cup and helped France win the bronze medal while averaging 4.3 points, 2.2 assists and 1.4 rebounds per game.

== Career statistics ==
Legend
GP	Games played	GS	Games started	MPG	Minutes per game
FG%	Field goal percentage	3P%	3-point field goal percentage	FT%	Free throw percentage
RPG	Rebounds per game	APG	Assists per game	SPG	Steals per game
BPG	Blocks per game	PPG	Points per game	**Bold**	Career high
†	Won an NBA championship

=== NBA ===
==== Regular season ====
Year	Team	GP	GS	MPG	FG%	3P%	FT%	RPG	APG	SPG	BPG	PPG
2024–25	New York	18	0	**6.2**	.323	**.316**	.667	**1.0**	.3	**.2**	**.1**	**1.7**
2025–26†	New York	**29**	0	4.7	**.333**	.219	**.818**	.9	**.4**	.1	.0	**1.7**
Career		47	0	5.3	.320	.255	.765	1.0	.4	.1	.1	1.7

==== Playoffs ====
Year	Team	GP	GS	MPG	FG%	3P%	FT%	RPG	APG	SPG	BPG	PPG
2025	New York	2	0	2.0	**1.000**	–	–	.0	.0	.0	.0	1.0
2026†	New York	**7**	0	**5.7**	.500	**.375**	**.500**	**1.0**	**.4**	**.3**	.0	**2.9**
Career		9	0	4.9	.529	.375	.500	.8	.3	.2	.0	2.4

== Personal life ==
Dadiet's older brother, Maxence, is also a basketball player, who represents the Ivory Coast at the international level.
