= Mohamed Diawara =

French basketball player (born 2005)

No. 51 – New York Knicks
- Position: Power forward
- League: NBA

Personal information
- Born: 29 April 2005 (age 21) Paris, France
- Listed height: 6 ft 9 in (2.06 m)
- Listed weight: 225 lb (102 kg)

Career information
- NBA draft: 2025: 2nd round, 51st overall pick
- Drafted by: Los Angeles Clippers
- Playing career: 2021–present

Career history
- 2021–2024: Paris Basketball
- 2023–2024: →Poitiers Basket 86
- 2024–2025: Cholet Basket
- 2025–present: New York Knicks
- 2025–2026: →Westchester Knicks

Career highlights
- NBA champion (2026); NBA Cup champion (2025)
- Stats at NBA.com
- Stats at Basketball Reference
Medals
Men's basketball
Representing France
FIBA Under-20 EuroBasket
Gold medal – first place	2024 Poland	Under-20
FIBA U17 World Cup
Bronze medal – third place	2022 Spain	Team

Mohamed Diawara (born 29 April 2005) is a French professional basketball player for the New York Knicks of the National Basketball Association (NBA). He previously played for Cholet Basket of the LNB Élite. Standing at 6 ft 9 in (2.06 m), he plays in the power forward position. In his rookie season, his team won the 2026 NBA Finals.

== Professional career ==
=== Paris Basketball ===
Diawara began his basketball career with the Parisian club La Domremy Basket 13 and later played for the youth team of Saint Charles Basket in Charenton-le-Pont. In the 2020–21 season, he was trained at the French academy INSEP and moved to Paris Basketball in the summer of 2021, for which he made his first appearances in the French first division in the following 2021–22 season. In the summer of 2022, he was named the best player at the Basketball Without Borders talent scouting event organized by the world governing body FIBA and the NBA in Milan.

=== Poitiers Basket and Cholet Basket ===
In December 2023, Diawara was loaned to second-division club Poitiers Basket 86, after receiving little playing time in Paris during the previous 2023–24 season. He was signed by first-division club Cholet Basket during the 2024 summer break.

=== New York Knicks ===
On 26 June 2025, Diawara was drafted by the Los Angeles Clippers with the 51st overall pick of the second round of the 2025 NBA draft, who traded his rights to the New York Knicks for the rights to Kobe Sanders.

On 29 December 2025, against the New Orleans Pelicans, Diawara recorded a career-high 18 points in 18 minutes, making all 4 of his three-point shots.

On 1 March 2026, against the San Antonio Spurs, Diawara scored 14 points in just 15 minutes off the bench, on 5-14 (35.7%) shooting, also securing 4 rebounds. The Knicks beat the Spurs 114–89, ending the Spurs' eleven-game winning streak, despite strong play from Spurs star and fellow Frenchman Victor Wembanyama.

On 4 March 2026, against the Oklahoma City Thunder, Diawara scored 9 points in just 13 minutes off the bench, making 3-4 of his three-point shots. Despite his hot shooting, he played only 3 minutes in the second half, and the Knicks lost to the Thunder 103–100.

On 13 June 2026, Diawara and the Knicks won the 2026 NBA Finals, beating the San Antonio Spurs 4–1.

On June 22, 2026, Diawara re-signed with the Knicks on a four-year, $10 million contract.

== National team career ==
Diawara played for the France under-17 basketball team at the 2022 FIBA Under-17 Basketball World Cup, in which his team won the bronze medal.

== Career statistics ==
Legend
GP	Games played	GS	Games started	MPG	Minutes per game
FG%	Field goal percentage	3P%	3-point field goal percentage	FT%	Free throw percentage
RPG	Rebounds per game	APG	Assists per game	SPG	Steals per game
BPG	Blocks per game	PPG	Points per game	**Bold**	Career high
†	Won an NBA championship

=== NBA ===
==== Regular season ====
Year	Team	GP	GS	MPG	FG%	3P%	FT%	RPG	APG	SPG	BPG	PPG
2025–26†	New York	69	7	9.2	.423	.369	.750	1.4	.8	.2	.1	3.6
Career		69	7	9.2	.423	.369	.750	1.4	.8	.2	.1	3.6

==== Playoffs ====
Year	Team	GP	GS	MPG	FG%	3P%	FT%	RPG	APG	SPG	BPG	PPG
2026†	New York	6	0	7.2	.231	.167	—	1.5	1.0	.2	.0	1.2
Career		6	0	7.2	.231	.167	—	1.5	1.0	.2	.0	1.2
