= Kevin McCullar Jr. =

American basketball player (born 2001)

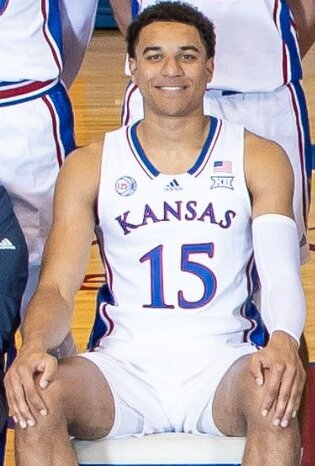
- McCullar in 2022

No. 11 – Toronto Raptors
- Position: Shooting guard
- League: NBA

Personal information
- Born: March 15, 2001 (age 25) San Antonio, Texas, U.S.
- Listed height: 6 ft 6 in (1.98 m)
- Listed weight: 210 lb (95 kg)

Career information
- High school: Karen Wagner (San Antonio, Texas)
- College: Texas Tech (2019–2022); Kansas (2022–2024)
- NBA draft: 2024: 2nd round, 56th overall pick
- Drafted by: Phoenix Suns
- Playing career: 2024–present

Career history
- 2024–2026: New York Knicks
- 2024–2026: →Westchester Knicks
- 2026–present: Toronto Raptors
- 2026–present: →Raptors 905

Career highlights
- NBA champion (2026); NBA Cup champion (2025); Third-team All-American – NABC (2024); First-team All-Big 12 (2024); Third-team All-Big 12 (2023); Big 12 All-Defensive Team (2023)
- Stats at NBA.com
- Stats at Basketball Reference

Kevin Dewayne McCullar Jr. (born March 15, 2001) is an American professional basketball player for the Toronto Raptors of the National Basketball Association (NBA), on a two-way contract with the Raptors 905 of the NBA G League. He played college basketball for the Texas Tech Red Raiders and Kansas Jayhawks.

== High school career ==
McCullar played basketball for Karen Wagner High School in San Antonio, Texas. As a sophomore, he helped his team reach the Class 6A state title game. In his junior season, McCullar averaged 16.8 points, 6.6 rebounds and 3.8 assists per game, before fracturing his tibia during the playoffs. He opted to graduate early and bypass his senior season. A consensus four-star recruit, he committed to playing college basketball for Texas Tech over offers from Houston, Kansas State and Louisville.

== College career ==
McCullar redshirted his first season at Texas Tech to rehabilitate after fracturing his tibia as a junior in high school. Despite his absence, his team reached the national championship game. As a freshman, McCullar averaged six points, 3.2 rebounds and 1.2 steals per game. In his sophomore season, he averaged 10.4 points, 6.3 rebounds and 1.7 steals per game, earning All-Big 12 honorable mention. On November 12, 2021, he scored a career-high 24 points in an 88–62 win against Grambling State. As a junior, McCullar averaged 10.1 points, 4.6 rebounds, and 3.1 assists per game. He hit 28 of 90 three pointers for 31.1%.

On April 27, 2022, he entered the transfer portal while also declaring for the 2022 NBA draft and maintaining his college eligibility. On May 19, 2022, McCullar announced he was transferring to Kansas while also remaining in the NBA draft. On June 1, 2022, McCullar removed himself from the NBA Draft and announced he would be playing for the Jayhawks. As a senior, he was named to the Third Team All-Big 12 as well as the All-Defensive Team.

== Professional career ==
On June 27, 2024, McCullar was selected with the 56th overall pick in the 2024 NBA draft by the Phoenix Suns, however, immediately on draft night, he was traded to the New York Knicks. On August 5, he signed a two-way contract with the Knicks. On March 25, 2025, McCullar made his NBA debut, and scored his first two career points in a 128–113 victory over the Dallas Mavericks. On December 27, 2025, McCullar had his career best game yet, as he recorded career highs in several statistical categories. Scoring 13 points, grabbing 8 rebounds, 4 of them offensive, 2 assists and 2 steals, whilst also going 3-of-6 from three-point range in 23 minutes in a 128-125 road victory over the Atlanta Hawks. Which earned him glowing praise from Knicks Head Coach Mike Brown in the post-game press conference, who commended McCullar’s defense, effort and mentality in being ready to step up when needed for his team. He was also voted Defensive Player Of The Game for the first time by his fellow Knicks teammates and coaches. On June 13, 2026, McCullar and the Knicks won the 2026 NBA Finals, beating the San Antonio Spurs 4–1.

== Career statistics ==
Legend
| GP | Games played | GS | Games started | MPG | Minutes per game |
| FG% | Field goal percentage | 3P% | 3-point field goal percentage | FT% | Free throw percentage |
| RPG | Rebounds per game | APG | Assists per game | SPG | Steals per game |
| BPG | Blocks per game | PPG | Points per game | **Bold** | Career high |
| † | Won an NBA championship |

=== NBA ===
| Year | Team | GP | GS | MPG | FG% | 3P% | FT% | RPG | APG | SPG | BPG | PPG |
|---|---|---|---|---|---|---|---|---|---|---|---|---|
| 2024–25 | New York | 4 | 0 | 7.3 | .286 | .000 | **1.000** | **2.0** | .5 | .3 | **.3** | 1.5 |
| 2025–26† | New York | **21** | 0 | **7.4** | **.426** | **.333** | .400 | 1.3 | **1.0** | **.4** | .0 | **2.4** |
| Career | | 25 | 0 | 7.4 | .407 | .320 | .571 | 1.4 | .9 | .4 | .0 | 2.2 |

=== College ===
| Year | Team | GP | GS | MPG | FG% | 3P% | FT% | RPG | APG | SPG | BPG | PPG |
|---|---|---|---|---|---|---|---|---|---|---|---|---|
| 2018–19 | Texas Tech | Redshirt | | | | | | | | | | |
| 2019–20 | Texas Tech | 29 | 6 | 18.6 | **.512** | .286 | .725 | 3.2 | .7 | 1.2 | .3 | 6.0 |
| 2020–21 | Texas Tech | 20 | 19 | 30.4 | .416 | .283 | .704 | 6.3 | 2.1 | 1.7 | **.8** | 10.4 |
| 2021–22 | Texas Tech | 29 | 24 | 29.9 | .402 | .311 | .725 | 4.6 | 3.1 | 1.4 | .2 | 10.1 |
| 2022–23 | Kansas | **34** | **33** | 30.6 | .444 | .296 | .761 | **7.0** | 2.4 | **2.0** | .7 | 10.7 |
| 2023–24 | Kansas | 26 | 26 | **34.2** | .454 | **.333** | **.805** | 6.0 | **4.1** | 1.5 | .4 | **18.3** |
| Career | | 138 | 108 | 28.6 | .441 | .309 | .756 | 5.4 | 2.4 | 1.6 | .5 | 11.0 |

== Personal life ==
McCullar's father, Kevin Sr., played college football for Texas Tech as a linebacker, before playing professionally with the Frankfurt Galaxy and Chicago Enforcers.
