= OG Anunoby =

British basketball player (born 1997)

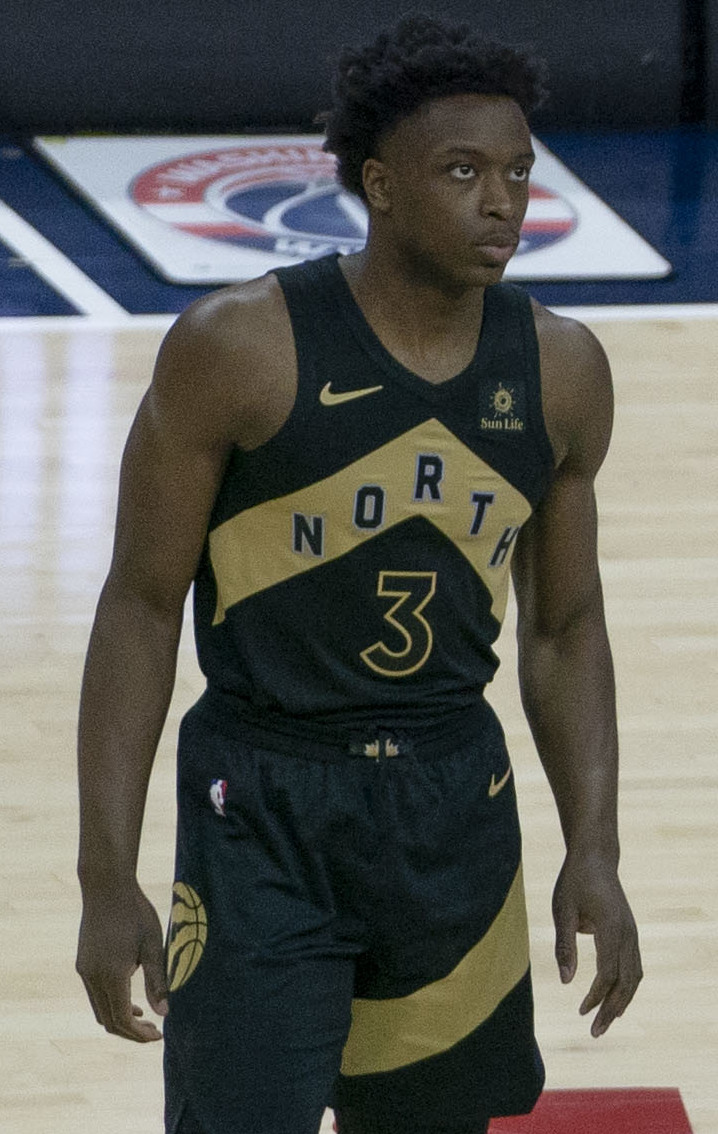
- Anunoby with the Toronto Raptors in 2018

No. 8 – New York Knicks
- Position: Small Forward / Power Forward
- League: NBA

Personal information
- Born: 17 July 1997 (age 29) Harlesden, London, England, UK
- Listed height: 6 ft 7 in (2.01 m)
- Listed weight: 240 lb (109 kg)

Career information
- High school: Jefferson City (Jefferson City, Missouri)
- College: Indiana (2015–2017)
- NBA draft: 2017: 1st round, 23rd overall pick
- Drafted by: Toronto Raptors
- Playing career: 2017–present

Career history
- 2017–2023: Toronto Raptors
- 2023–present: New York Knicks

Career highlights
- 2× NBA champion (2019, 2026); 2× NBA All-Defensive Second Team (2023, 2026); NBA steals leader (2023); NBA Cup champion (2025)
- Stats at NBA.com
- Stats at Basketball Reference

Ogugua "OG" Anunoby Jr. (born 17 July 1997) is a British professional basketball player for the New York Knicks of the National Basketball Association (NBA). He played college basketball for the Indiana Hoosiers and was selected by the Toronto Raptors in the first round of the 2017 NBA draft. With Toronto, Anunoby won an NBA championship in 2019, though he was injured and did not play in the finals. During the 2022–23 season, he led the league in steals while earning his first NBA All-Defensive Team selection.

In December 2023, Anunoby was traded to the Knicks. In the 2025–26 season, he was named to his second All-Defensive Team and reached the NBA Finals with New York. In Game 4, he tipped in the game-winning shot to complete the largest single-game comeback in NBA Finals history, helping the Knicks win the Finals in five games and end their 53 year wait. Anunoby is considered to be the greatest British player to ever play in the NBA.

== Early life ==
Ogugua Anunoby was born in Harlesden, London, England, on 17 July 1997, to Nigerian parents of Igbo descent. His father, Ogugua Sr., taught as a professor at Oxford Brookes University. His mother, Grace Ndidi Okereke, was a track and field athlete who competed at a national level for Nigeria and died of cancer when Anunoby was one year old. At age four, Anunoby moved with his family to the US and settled in Jefferson City, Missouri, where his father was a professor of finance at Lincoln University. His older brother, Chigbo, played in the National Football League for the Cleveland Browns, Tennessee Titans and Minnesota Vikings. Anunoby played football when he was young, but stopped around the age of eight to focus on basketball because of his height.

Anunoby played for Jefferson City High School. During his senior season, he averaged 19.1 points and 8.6 rebounds per game and was named a finalist for Mr Basketball in the state of Missouri. In October 2014, Anunoby chose to attend Indiana University over Georgia, Iowa, George Mason and Ole Miss.

College recruiting
Name	Hometown	School	Height	Weight	Commit date
OG Anunoby; F	Jefferson City, MO	Jefferson City HS	6 ft 8 in (2.03 m)	235 lb (107 kg)	Oct 14, 2014
OG Anunoby; F	Recruit ratings: Scout: Rivals: 247Sports: ESPN:				
Overall recruit ranking:
Note: In many cases, Scout, Rivals, 247Sports, On3, and ESPN may conflict in their listings of height and weight.; In these cases, the average was taken. ESPN grades are on a 100-point scale.; Sources: "Indiana Hoosiers". ESPN.; "2015 Team Ranking". Rivals.

== College career ==
As a freshman in 2015–16 at Indiana, Anunoby appeared in 34 games, averaging 6.9 points, 6.6 rebounds and 0.6 assists per game.

Anunoby was selected as a Pre-season All-American by The Sporting News. On 18 January 2017, he tore the ACL in his right knee against Penn State, causing him to undergo season-ending knee surgery. On 10 April, Anunoby declared his intention to enter the 2017 NBA draft and hired an agent, ending his tenure with the Hoosiers.

== Professional career ==
=== Toronto Raptors (2017–2023) ===
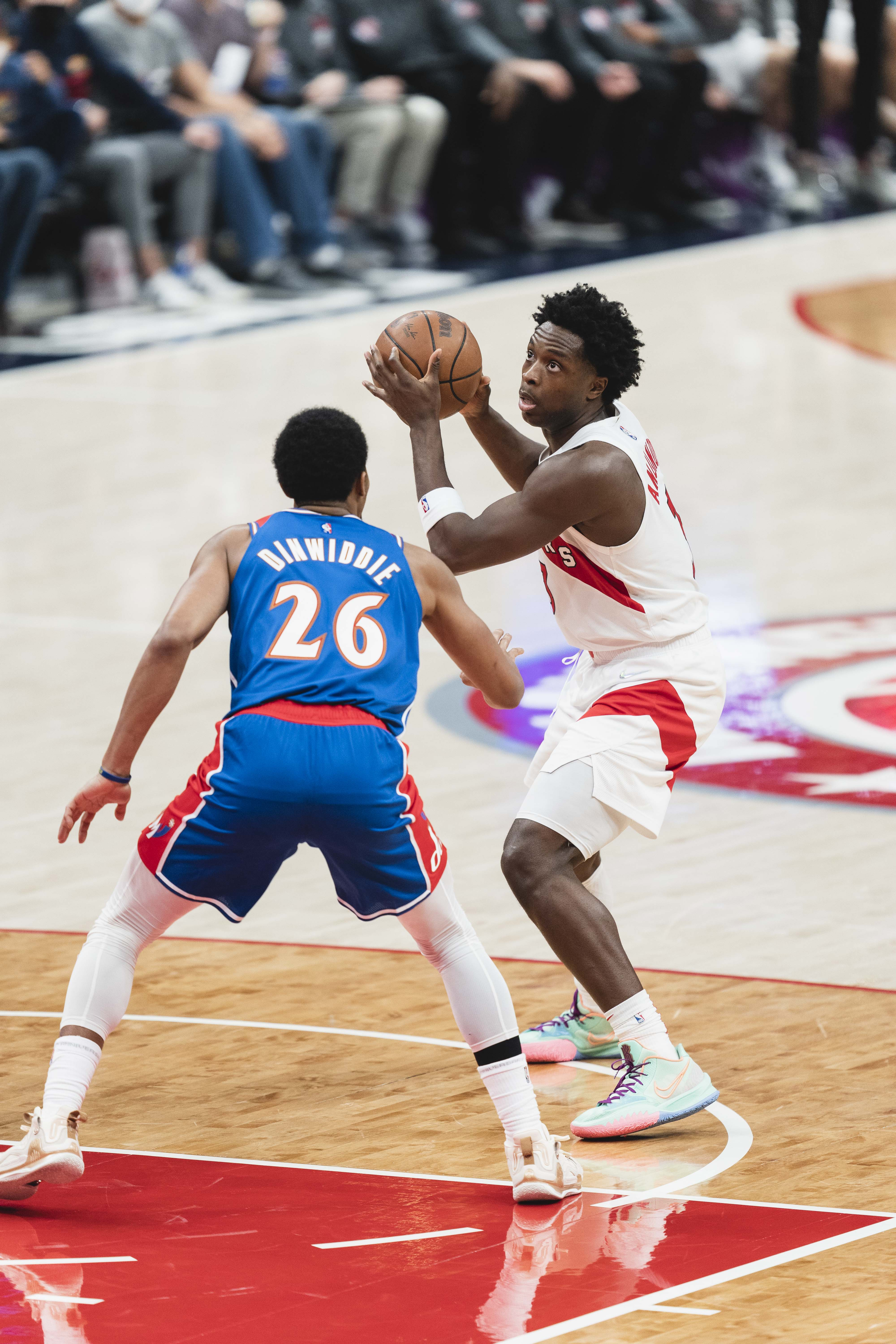
Anunoby playing for Toronto Raptors

On 22 June 2017, he was selected with the 23rd overall pick in the 2017 NBA draft by the Toronto Raptors. On 9 July, he signed his rookie scale contract with the Raptors. On 14 November, Anunoby made his first career start, against the Houston Rockets. He finished the game with 16 points, 2 rebounds, 1 assist and 1 steal in 30 minutes. By 15 December, he led starter rookies in offensive and defensive rating and had the third-highest true shooting percentage and best turnover-to-assist ratio for a non-guard.

On 29 January 2019, Anunoby was named a member of the World Team representing the United Kingdom for the 2019 Rising Stars Challenge. In early April, he had an emergency appendectomy, which caused him to miss the Raptors' entire championship playoff run. He dressed for the NBA Finals but did not play as the Raptors won the title, becoming the first British player to win an NBA championship.

On 1 March 2020, Anunoby scored 32 points and recorded seven steals, seven rebounds and three assists in a 133–118 loss to the Denver Nuggets. He hit a game-winning, buzzer-beating three-pointer on 3 September, in a 104–103 win in Game 3 of the Eastern Conference semifinals against the Boston Celtics, and finished with 12 points. The buzzer-beater prevented the Raptors from going down to a 0–3 deficit to the Celtics. The Raptors fell in seven games. On 21 December 2020, he signed a four-year, $72 million extension, through the 2024–25 season. On 24 January 2021, Anunoby scored a season-high 30 points while getting eight rebounds, one assist, five steals and a block in a 107–102 win against the Indiana Pacers, joining former Raptor Kawhi Leonard as the only players with multiple games getting 30 points, five rebounds and five steals in franchise history. On 1 November, Anunoby scored a career-high 36 points along with 6 rebounds and 2 assists along with the win against the Knicks.

On 25 February 2022, Anunoby was sidelined due to a right finger fracture suffered against the Charlotte Hornets. On 3 March, he was ruled out for two weeks to rest his fractured finger. On 16 November 2022, Anunoby scored a season-high 32 points during a 112–104 win against the Miami Heat. During the 2022–23 season, Anunoby led the league in steals, becoming the first Raptors player and first British player to accomplish the feat. At the end of the season, Anunoby was named for the first time to the NBA All-Defensive Second Team.

=== New York Knicks (2023–present) ===
On 30 December 2023, the Raptors traded Anunoby, Precious Achiuwa and Malachi Flynn to the New York Knicks in exchange for RJ Barrett, Immanuel Quickley, and a second-round pick. On 1 January 2024, Anunoby made his Knicks debut, putting up 17 points and six rebounds in a 112–106 win over the Minnesota Timberwolves. During his first 10 games as a Knick, he set an NBA record with a +170 plus–minus. On 8 February, it was announced that Anunoby had surgery on his right elbow to remove a loose bone fragment, sidelining him for a month. Anunoby returned to play against the Philadelphia 76ers on 12 March. On 24 June, Anunoby declined his $19.9 million player option with the Knicks, becoming a free agent.

On 6 July 2024, Anunoby re-signed with the Knicks on a five-year, $212.5 million contract. On 25 November, he scored a career-high 40 points in a 145–118 win against the Denver Nuggets. Anunoby had a streak where he scored at least 20 points in a career-high ten straight games. For the season, he tied a career high in games played (74) and a career high in scoring with 18 points per game, while barely missing out on another NBA All-Defensive Team selection.

On 22 May 2026, Anunoby was named to his second NBA All-Defensive Second Team.

In Game 4 of the NBA Finals, Anunoby had a playoff career-high 33 points and made a game-winning tip-in off a missed Jalen Brunson three-pointer with under two seconds left, following his game-saving block of a De'Aaron Fox lay up, capping off a 29-point comeback, the largest in Finals history, to take a 3–1 series lead against the San Antonio Spurs. Anunoby's 33 points and Brunson's 36 points marked the first time two Knicks have scored at least 30 points in an NBA Finals game. In Game 5, Anunoby helped the Knicks achieve a 94–90 win and close out the NBA Finals against the Spurs, 4–1, securing the Knicks' first NBA championship in 53 years since the 1972–73 NBA season. In the NBA Finals, Anunoby averaged 21.2 points per game, 4.8 rebounds, 1 assist, 1.4 steals and 1.4 blocks per game, while shooting 52.5% from the field, 50% from three-point range and 86.7% from the free-throw line. Anunoby had an NBA playoffs 67.2% effective field goal percentage, the most for a player in a single-postseason with at least 150 field goal attempts in NBA history.

== Player profile ==
Anunoby is regarded as an elite "3-and-D" forward and one of the best defensive players of his era. His defence is consistently praised by teammates and coaches, as his 6' 7" figure combined with a 7' 2" wingspan allows him to switch and guard all five positions on the court. His unique combination of size, strength, speed, and intelligence on defence allow him to anticipate every offensive scheme that comes his way. These characteristics provide him with the ability to navigate screens swiftly, while chasing guards and battle down low in the post against centres. His defensive qualities earned him two NBA All-Defensive Second Team.

On offence, Anunoby provides value as a shooter with his ability to consistently make three-point shots, shooting 37% throughout his career. He also has elite off-the-ball movements which allows him to play along side ball dominant guards such as Jalen Brunson, by giving him options with cuts and slashing to the basket.

== Personal life ==
Anunoby has said, "It's definitely a goal of mine to inspire kids in Great Britain to want to play basketball and show that they can make it to the NBA from Britain." He is a lifelong supporter of Arsenal F.C., naming Thierry Henry as his favourite player growing up.

In 2021, Anunoby's jersey was retired at Jefferson City High School.

In 2023, Anunoby became a minority stake owner of the London Lions.

== Career statistics ==
Legend
GP	Games played	GS	Games started	MPG	Minutes per game
FG%	Field goal percentage	3P%	3-point field goal percentage	FT%	Free throw percentage
RPG	Rebounds per game	APG	Assists per game	SPG	Steals per game
BPG	Blocks per game	PPG	Points per game	**Bold**	Career high
†	Won an NBA championship	*	Led the league

=== NBA ===
==== Regular season ====
Year	Team	GP	GS	MPG	FG%	3P%	FT%	RPG	APG	SPG	BPG	PPG
2017–18	Toronto	**74**	62	20.0	.471	.371	.629	2.5	.7	.7	.2	5.9
2018–19†	Toronto	67	6	20.2	.453	.332	.581	2.9	.7	.7	.3	7.0
2019–20	Toronto	69	68	29.9	**.505**	.390	.706	5.3	1.6	1.4	.7	10.6
2020–21	Toronto	43	43	33.3	.480	**.398**	.784	**5.5**	2.2	1.5	.7	15.9
2021–22	Toronto	48	48	36.0	.443	.363	.754	**5.5**	2.6	1.5	.5	17.1
2022–23	Toronto	67	67	35.6	.476	.387	**.838**	5.0	2.0	**1.9***	.7	16.8
2023–24	Toronto	27	27	33.3	.489	.374	.717	3.9	**2.7**	1.0	.5	15.1
2023–24	New York	23	23	34.9	.488	.394	.791	4.4	1.5	1.7	**1.0**	14.1
2024–25	New York	**74**	**74**	**36.6**	.476	.372	.810	4.8	2.2	1.5	.9	**18.0**
2025–26†	New York	67	67	33.2	.484	.386	.828	5.2	2.2	1.6	.7	16.7
Career		559	485	30.6	.476	.377	.774	4.5	1.7	1.3	.6	13.3

==== Playoffs ====
Year	Team	GP	GS	MPG	FG%	3P%	FT%	RPG	APG	SPG	BPG	PPG
2018	Toronto	10	10	23.8	.558	.448	.727	2.1	.7	.6	.4	7.9
2020	Toronto	11	11	35.7	.455	.415	.643	**6.9**	1.2	1.0	**1.2**	10.5
2022	Toronto	6	6	36.1	.476	.341	.750	4.0	**2.5**	1.0	.2	17.3
2024	New York	9	9	36.0	.505	.410	.615	6.0	1.1	.9	1.0	15.1
2025	New York	**18**	**18**	**39.2**	.417	.339	.810	4.6	1.3	**2.0**	**1.2**	16.3
2026†	New York	17	17	34.5	**.561**	**.489**	**.854**	6.3	1.6	1.5	1.1	**20.1**
Career		71	71	34.7	.486	.402	.786	5.1	1.4	1.3	1.0	15.1

=== College ===
Year	Team	GP	GS	MPG	FG%	3P%	FT%	RPG	APG	SPG	BPG	PPG
2015–16	Indiana	**34**	0	13.7	**.569**	**.448**	.476	2.6	.5	.8	.8	4.9
2016–17	Indiana	16	**10**	**25.1**	.557	.311	**.563**	**5.4**	**1.4**	**1.3**	**1.3**	**11.1**
Career		50	10	17.4	.563	.365	.522	3.5	.8	1.0	.9	6.8
