= 2024–25 New York Knicks season =

Season of National Basketball Association team the New York Knicks

- Head coach: Tom Thibodeau
- President: Leon Rose
- General manager: Gersson Rosas
- Owners: Madison Square Garden Sports
- Arena: Madison Square Garden

Results
- Record: 51–31 (.622)
- Place: Division: 2nd (Atlantic); Conference: 3rd (Eastern)
- Playoff finish: Eastern Conference Finals (lost to Pacers 2–4)
- Stats at Basketball Reference

Local media
- Television: MSG TV
- Radio: WEPN-FM

The 2024–25 New York Knicks season was the 79th season of the franchise in the National Basketball Association (NBA).

The Knicks advanced to the 2024 NBA Cup knockout stage after winning East Group A with an undefeated 4–0 group stage record. However, they were eliminated by the Atlanta Hawks in the quarterfinals.

On March 28, 2025, the Knicks clinched a playoff spot following their victory against the Milwaukee Bucks. Marginally improving on last year's record, the Knicks finished the regular season 51–31 and advanced to play the Detroit Pistons in the first round. Despite losing 2 out of 3 games at Madison Square Garden, the Knicks would win all 3 games at Detroit to win the series in 6. In the conference semifinals, against the defending champions, the Boston Celtics, the Knicks dethroned the 2024 champions in 6 games, advancing to their first Eastern Conference Finals since 2000 when the Knicks also played Indiana. It was also the first time in 26 years where they had clinched a playoff series at home, the last instance being in the 1999 NBA playoffs. New York would once again face off with the rival Indiana Pacers in the conference finals; the Pacers would eliminate the Knicks in six games, ending their season. This was the second consecutive year that the Pacers had beaten the Knicks in the playoffs.

The New York Knicks drew an average home attendance of 19,799, the 4th-highest of all NBA teams.

== Draft ==
Round	Pick	Player	Position(s)	Nationality	College / club
1	24	Kyshawn George	SG	Switzerland	Miami (FL)
1	25	Pacôme Dadiet	SG	France	Ratiopharm Ulm Germany
2	38	Ajay Mitchell	PG	Belgium	UC Santa Barbara
2	51	Melvin Ajinça	SF	France	Saint-Quentin BB France

The Knicks entered the draft (which was two days long instead of one as it had been since the NBA draft was shortened to two rounds in 1989) with two first-round picks and one second-round pick. They kept their own first-round pick that landed 25th, while three others were acquired through prior trades. They had traded their original second-round selection to the Charlotte Hornets in 2023 before the pick was eventually used by the Detroit Pistons in the draft.

The Knicks acquired an additional second-round pick in a trade following the completion of the first round.

== Roster ==
2024–25 New York Knicks roster
Players

Pos.	No.	Player	Height	Weight	DOB	From
F/C	5	Precious Achiuwa	6 ft 8 in (2.03 m)	243 lb (110 kg)	1999-09-19	Memphis
F	8	OG Anunoby	6 ft 7 in (2.01 m)	240 lb (109 kg)	1997-07-17	Indiana
F	14	MarJon Beauchamp (TW)	6 ft 7 in (2.01 m)	199 lb (90 kg)	2000-10-12	Yakima Valley
G/F	25	Mikal Bridges	6 ft 6 in (1.98 m)	209 lb (95 kg)	1996-08-30	Villanova
G	11	Jalen Brunson	6 ft 2 in (1.88 m)	190 lb (86 kg)	1996-08-31	Villanova
F	4	Pacôme Dadiet	6 ft 8 in (2.03 m)	210 lb (95 kg)	2005-07-27	France
G/F	3	Josh Hart	6 ft 4 in (1.93 m)	215 lb (98 kg)	1995-03-06	Villanova
C	55	Ariel Hukporti	6 ft 11 in (2.11 m)	246 lb (112 kg)	2002-04-12	Germany
G	13	Tyler Kolek	6 ft 3 in (1.91 m)	195 lb (88 kg)	2001-03-27	Marquette
G	2	Miles McBride	6 ft 2 in (1.88 m)	195 lb (88 kg)	2000-09-08	West Virginia
G	9	Kevin McCullar Jr. (TW)	6 ft 6 in (1.98 m)	210 lb (95 kg)	2001-03-15	Kansas
G	1	Cameron Payne	6 ft 3 in (1.91 m)	183 lb (83 kg)	1994-08-08	Murray State
C	23	Mitchell Robinson	7 ft 0 in (2.13 m)	240 lb (109 kg)	1998-04-01	Chalmette HS (LA)
G	44	Landry Shamet	6 ft 4 in (1.93 m)	190 lb (86 kg)	1997-03-13	Wichita State
C	32	Karl-Anthony Towns	7 ft 0 in (2.13 m)	248 lb (112 kg)	1995-11-15	Kentucky
F	17	P. J. Tucker	6 ft 5 in (1.96 m)	245 lb (111 kg)	1985-05-05	Texas
F	21	Anton Watson (TW)	6 ft 8 in (2.03 m)	225 lb (102 kg)	2000-10-06	Gonzaga
G	0	Delon Wright	6 ft 5 in (1.96 m)	185 lb (84 kg)	1992-04-26	Utah

Coaches
Head coach
- Tom Thibodeau
Assistant(s)
- Daniel Brady
- Rick Brunson
- Mark Bryant
- Maurice Cheeks (associate HC)
- Darren Erman
- Andy Greer
- Daisuke Yoshimoto

Legend
- (DP) Unsigned draft pick
- (FA) Free agent
- (S) Suspended
- (GL) On assignment to G League affiliate
- (TW) Two-way affiliate player
- Injured

Roster
Updated: May 17, 2025

== Standings ==
=== Division ===
Atlantic Division	W	L	PCT	GB	Home	Road	Div	GP
y – Boston Celtics	61	21	.744	–	28‍–‍13	33‍–‍8	14‍–‍2	82
x – New York Knicks	51	31	.622	10.0	27‍–‍14	24‍–‍17	12‍–‍4	82
Toronto Raptors	30	52	.366	31.0	18‍–‍23	12‍–‍29	8‍–‍8	82
Brooklyn Nets	26	56	.317	35.0	12‍–‍29	14‍–‍27	3‍–‍13	82
Philadelphia 76ers	24	58	.293	37.0	12‍–‍29	12‍–‍29	3‍–‍13	82

=== Conference ===
Eastern Conference
#	Team	W	L	PCT	GB	GP
1	c – Cleveland Cavaliers *	64	18	.780	–	82
2	y – Boston Celtics *	61	21	.744	3.0	82
3	x – New York Knicks	51	31	.622	13.0	82
4	x – Indiana Pacers	50	32	.610	14.0	82
5	x – Milwaukee Bucks	48	34	.585	16.0	82
6	x – Detroit Pistons	44	38	.537	20.0	82
7	y – Orlando Magic *	41	41	.500	23.0	82
8	pi – Atlanta Hawks	40	42	.488	24.0	82
9	pi – Chicago Bulls	39	43	.476	25.0	82
10	x – Miami Heat	37	45	.451	27.0	82
11	Toronto Raptors	30	52	.366	34.0	82
12	Brooklyn Nets	26	56	.317	38.0	82
13	Philadelphia 76ers	24	58	.293	40.0	82
14	Charlotte Hornets	19	63	.232	45.0	82
15	Washington Wizards	18	64	.220	46.0	82

== Game log ==
=== Preseason ===
2024 preseason game log
Total: 4–1 (Home: 3–0; Road: 1–1)
Preseason: 4–1 (home: 3–0; road: 1–1)

Game	Date	Team	Score	High points	High rebounds	High assists	Location Attendance	Record
1	October 6	@ Charlotte	W 111–109	Miles McBride (22)	Jericho Sims (10)	Cameron Payne (6)	Spectrum Center; 10,486	1–0
2	October 9	Washington	W 117–94	Karl-Anthony Towns (25)	Karl-Anthony Towns (12)	Hart, Kolek (5)	Madison Square Garden; 19,161	2–0
3	October 13	Minnesota	W 115–110	Jalen Brunson (24)	Karl-Anthony Towns (16)	Jalen Brunson (6)	Madison Square Garden; 19,812	3–0
4	October 15	Charlotte	W 111–105	Precious Achiuwa (20)	Precious Achiuwa (16)	Tyler Kolek (9)	Madison Square Garden; 19,355	4–0
5	October 18	@ Washington	L 117–118	Jalen Brunson (27)	Karl-Anthony Towns (12)	Jalen Brunson (5)	Capital One Arena; 11,894	4–1

2024–25 preseason schedule

=== Regular season ===
2024–25 game log
Total: 51–31 (Home: 27–14; Road: 24–17)
October: 2–2 (home: 1–1; road: 1–1)

Game	Date	Team	Score	High points	High rebounds	High assists	Location Attendance	Record
1	October 22	@ Boston	L 109–132	Brunson, McBride (22)	Jericho Sims (9)	Cameron Payne (4)	TD Garden; 19,156	0–1
2	October 25	Indiana	W 123–98	Jalen Brunson (26)	Karl-Anthony Towns (15)	Bridges, Brunson (5)	Madison Square Garden; 19,812	1–1
3	October 28	Cleveland	L 104–110	Jalen Brunson (21)	Josh Hart (13)	Jalen Brunson (7)	Madison Square Garden; 19,812	1–2
4	October 30	@ Miami	W 116–107	Karl-Anthony Towns (44)	Josh Hart (14)	Jalen Brunson (9)	Kaseya Center; 19,620	2–2

November: 9–6 (home: 4–1; road: 5–5)

Game	Date	Team	Score	High points	High rebounds	High assists	Location Attendance	Record
5	November 1	@ Detroit	W 128–98	Jalen Brunson (36)	Karl-Anthony Towns (11)	Karl-Anthony Towns (7)	Little Caesars Arena; 17,022	3–2
6	November 4	@ Houston	L 97–109	Jalen Brunson (29)	Karl-Anthony Towns (19)	Jalen Brunson (8)	Toyota Center; 16,417	3–3
7	November 6	@ Atlanta	L 116–121	Karl-Anthony Towns (34)	Karl-Anthony Towns (16)	Josh Hart (8)	State Farm Arena; 16,072	3–4
8	November 8	Milwaukee	W 116–94	Karl-Anthony Towns (32)	Karl-Anthony Towns (11)	Jalen Brunson (9)	Madison Square Garden; 19,812	4–4
9	November 10	@ Indiana	L 121–132	Jalen Brunson (33)	Josh Hart (10)	Jalen Brunson (10)	Gainbridge Fieldhouse; 17,274	4–5
10	November 12	@ Philadelphia	W 111–99	OG Anunoby (24)	Karl-Anthony Towns (13)	Josh Hart (10)	Wells Fargo Center; 19,758	5–5
11	November 13	Chicago	L 123–124	Karl-Anthony Towns (46)	Karl-Anthony Towns (10)	Jalen Brunson (8)	Madison Square Garden; 19,812	5–6
12	November 15	Brooklyn	W 124–122	Jalen Brunson (37)	Josh Hart (9)	Josh Hart (9)	Madison Square Garden; 19,812	6–6
13	November 17	Brooklyn	W 114–104	Karl-Anthony Towns (26)	Karl-Anthony Towns (15)	Jalen Brunson (10)	Madison Square Garden; 19,812	7–6
14	November 18	Washington	W 134–106	Jalen Brunson (26)	Karl-Anthony Towns (12)	Jalen Brunson (11)	Madison Square Garden; 19,812	8–6
15	November 20	@ Phoenix	W 138–122	Jalen Brunson (36)	Josh Hart (11)	Jalen Brunson (10)	Footprint Center; 17,071	9–6
16	November 23	@ Utah	L 106–121	OG Anunoby (27)	Karl-Anthony Towns (16)	Jalen Brunson (8)	Delta Center; 18,175	9–7
17	November 25	@ Denver	W 145–118	OG Anunoby (40)	Karl-Anthony Towns (15)	Jalen Brunson (17)	Ball Arena; 19,842	10–7
18	November 27	@ Dallas	L 114–129	Jalen Brunson (37)	Karl-Anthony Towns (14)	Jalen Brunson (7)	American Airlines Center; 20,413	10–8
19	November 29	@ Charlotte	W 99–98	Jalen Brunson (31)	Hart, Towns (12)	Jalen Brunson (6)	Spectrum Center; 19,313	11–8

December: 12–2 (home: 5–2; road: 7–0)

Game	Date	Team	Score	High points	High rebounds	High assists	Location Attendance	Record
20	December 1	New Orleans	W 118–85	Mikal Bridges (31)	Karl-Anthony Towns (19)	Jalen Brunson (9)	Madison Square Garden; 19,812	12–8
21	December 3	Orlando	W 121–106	Karl-Anthony Towns (23)	Karl-Anthony Towns (15)	Josh Hart (10)	Madison Square Garden; 19,812	13–8
22	December 5	Charlotte	W 125–101	Karl-Anthony Towns (27)	Karl-Anthony Towns (16)	Mikal Bridges (7)	Madison Square Garden; 19,812	14–8
23	December 7	Detroit	L 111–120	Jalen Brunson (31)	Precious Achiuwa (10)	Jalen Brunson (10)	Madison Square Garden; 19,812	14–9
24	December 9	@ Toronto	W 113–108	Karl-Anthony Towns (24)	Karl-Anthony Towns (15)	Jalen Brunson (11)	Scotiabank Arena; 18,284	15–9
25	December 11	Atlanta	L 100–108	Josh Hart (21)	Karl-Anthony Towns (19)	Jalen Brunson (8)	Madison Square Garden; 19,812	15–10
26	December 15	@ Orlando	W 100–91	Jalen Brunson (31)	Karl-Anthony Towns (22)	Brunson, Hart, Towns (5)	Kia Center; 17,029	16–10
27	December 19	@ Minnesota	W 133–107	Karl-Anthony Towns (32)	Karl-Anthony Towns (20)	Miles McBride (8)	Target Center; 18,978	17–10
28	December 21	@ New Orleans	W 104–93	Jalen Brunson (39)	Karl-Anthony Towns (10)	Jalen Brunson (6)	Smoothie King Center; 16,696	18–10
29	December 23	Toronto	W 139–125	Anunoby, Towns (31)	Karl-Anthony Towns (10)	Brunson, Towns (7)	Madison Square Garden; 19,812	19–10
30	December 25	San Antonio	W 117–114	Mikal Bridges (41)	Josh Hart (12)	Jalen Brunson (9)	Madison Square Garden; 19,812	20–10
31	December 27	@ Orlando	W 108–85	Jalen Brunson (26)	Josh Hart (13)	Jalen Brunson (9)	Kia Center; 18,961	21–10
32	December 28	@ Washington	W 136–132 (OT)	Jalen Brunson (55)	Karl-Anthony Towns (14)	Jalen Brunson (9)	Capital One Arena; 20,385	22–10
33	December 30	@ Washington	W 126–106	Karl-Anthony Towns (32)	Josh Hart (15)	Josh Hart (10)	Capital One Arena; 20,385	23–10

January: 9–6 (home: 7–4; road: 2–2)

Game	Date	Team	Score	High points	High rebounds	High assists	Location Attendance	Record
34	January 1	Utah	W 119–103	Karl-Anthony Towns (31)	Karl-Anthony Towns (21)	Josh Hart (12)	Madison Square Garden; 19,812	24–10
35	January 3	@ Oklahoma City	L 107–117	Mikal Bridges (24)	Karl-Anthony Towns (22)	Jalen Brunson (9)	Paycom Center; 18,203	24–11
36	January 4	@ Chicago	L 126–139	Karl-Anthony Towns (44)	Hart, Towns (16)	Josh Hart (10)	United Center; 22,491	24–12
37	January 6	Orlando	L 94–103	Bridges, Brunson (24)	Josh Hart (14)	Jalen Brunson (4)	Madison Square Garden; 19,812	24–13
38	January 8	Toronto	W 112–98	Anunoby, Towns (27)	Karl-Anthony Towns (13)	Brunson, Hart (7)	Madison Square Garden; 19,812	25–13
39	January 10	Oklahoma City	L 101–126	Jalen Brunson (27)	Josh Hart (13)	Brunson, McBride (5)	Madison Square Garden; 19,812	25–14
40	January 12	Milwaukee	W 140–106	Jalen Brunson (44)	Karl-Anthony Towns (18)	Bridges, Brunson (6)	Madison Square Garden; 19,812	26–14
41	January 13	Detroit	L 119–124	Jalen Brunson (31)	Josh Hart (14)	Jalen Brunson (11)	Madison Square Garden; 19,812	26–15
42	January 15	@ Philadelphia	W 125–119 (OT)	Jalen Brunson (38)	Josh Hart (17)	Josh Hart (12)	Wells Fargo Center; 20,088	27–15
43	January 17	Minnesota	L 99–116	Jalen Brunson (26)	OG Anunoby (10)	Bridges, Brunson (5)	Madison Square Garden; 19,812	27–16
44	January 20	Atlanta	W 119–110	Jalen Brunson (34)	Anunoby, Hart, Towns (9)	Karl-Anthony Towns (7)	Madison Square Garden; 19,812	28–16
45	January 21	@ Brooklyn	W 99–95	Karl-Anthony Towns (25)	Karl-Anthony Towns (16)	Josh Hart (9)	Barclays Center; 17,926	29–16
46	January 25	Sacramento	W 143–120	OG Anunoby (33)	Josh Hart (18)	Brunson, Hart (11)	Madison Square Garden; 19,812	30–16
47	January 27	Memphis	W 143–106	Mikal Bridges (28)	Karl-Anthony Towns (11)	Bridges, Brunson (6)	Madison Square Garden; 19,812	31–16
48	January 29	Denver	W 122–112	Jalen Brunson (30)	Karl-Anthony Towns (10)	Jalen Brunson (15)	Madison Square Garden; 19,812	32–16

February: 7–4 (home: 4–2; road: 3–2)

Game	Date	Team	Score	High points	High rebounds	High assists	Location Attendance	Record
49	February 1	L.A. Lakers	L 112–128	Josh Hart (26)	Precious Achiuwa (15)	Josh Hart (11)	Madison Square Garden; 19,812	32–17
50	February 3	Houston	W 124–118	Jalen Brunson (42)	Achiuwa, Towns (9)	Jalen Brunson (10)	Madison Square Garden; 19,812	33–17
51	February 4	@ Toronto	W 121–115	Jalen Brunson (28)	Karl-Anthony Towns (20)	Hart, Payne (6)	Scotiabank Arena; 17,398	34–17
52	February 8	Boston	L 104–131	Jalen Brunson (36)	Karl-Anthony Towns (9)	Jalen Brunson (5)	Madison Square Garden; 19,812	34–18
53	February 11	@ Indiana	W 128–115	Karl-Anthony Towns (40)	Achiuwa, Towns (12)	Cameron Payne (8)	Gainbridge Fieldhouse; 16,685	35–18
54	February 12	Atlanta	W 149–148 (OT)	Karl-Anthony Towns (44)	Hart, Towns (10)	Jalen Brunson (8)	Madison Square Garden; 19,812	36–18
All-Star Game
55	February 20	Chicago	W 113–111 (OT)	Karl-Anthony Towns (32)	Karl-Anthony Towns (18)	Jalen Brunson (12)	Madison Square Garden; 19,812	37–18
56	February 21	@ Cleveland	L 105–142	Jalen Brunson (26)	Precious Achiuwa (10)	Mikal Bridges (5)	Rocket Arena; 19,432	37–19
57	February 23	@ Boston	L 105–118	Karl-Anthony Towns (24)	Karl-Anthony Towns (18)	Josh Hart (9)	TD Garden; 19,156	37–20
58	February 26	Philadelphia	W 110–105	Jalen Brunson (34)	Josh Hart (17)	Jalen Brunson (7)	Madison Square Garden; 19,812	38–20
59	February 28	@ Memphis	W 114–113	Jalen Brunson (23)	Brunson, Towns (7)	Brunson, Hart (6)	FedExForum; 17,794	39–20

March: 8–7 (home: 4–2; road: 4–5)

Game	Date	Team	Score	High points	High rebounds	High assists	Location Attendance	Record
60	March 2	@ Miami	W 116–112 (OT)	Jalen Brunson (31)	Karl-Anthony Towns (16)	Mikal Bridges (8)	Kaseya Center; 19,725	40–20
61	March 4	Golden State	L 102–114	OG Anunoby (29)	Precious Achiuwa (15)	Jalen Brunson (7)	Madison Square Garden; 19,812	40–21
62	March 6	@ L.A. Lakers	L 109–113 (OT)	Jalen Brunson (39)	Karl-Anthony Towns (14)	Jalen Brunson (10)	Crypto.com Arena; 18,997	40–22
63	March 7	@ L.A. Clippers	L 95–105	Karl-Anthony Towns (23)	Josh Hart (20)	Hart, McBride (6)	Intuit Dome; 17,927	40–23
64	March 10	@ Sacramento	W 133–104	Karl-Anthony Towns (26)	Karl-Anthony Towns (9)	Anunoby, Bridges (8)	Golden 1 Center; 16,539	41–23
65	March 12	@ Portland	W 114–113 (OT)	Mikal Bridges (33)	Josh Hart (11)	Josh Hart (9)	Moda Center; 17,510	42–23
66	March 15	@ Golden State	L 94–97	Karl-Anthony Towns (29)	Karl-Anthony Towns (12)	Josh Hart (7)	Chase Center; 18,064	42–24
67	March 17	Miami	W 116–95	Mikal Bridges (28)	Josh Hart (13)	Josh Hart (11)	Madison Square Garden; 19,812	43–24
68	March 19	@ San Antonio	L 105–120	Karl-Anthony Towns (32)	Mitchell Robinson (11)	Bridges, Hart (7)	Frost Bank Center; 18,521	43–25
69	March 20	@ Charlotte	L 98–115	OG Anunoby (25)	Karl-Anthony Towns (10)	Bridges, Hart, McBride (6)	Spectrum Center; 18,557	43–26
70	March 22	Washington	W 122–103	Karl-Anthony Towns (31)	Josh Hart (12)	Tyler Kolek (8)	Madison Square Garden; 19,812	44–26
71	March 25	Dallas	W 128–113	OG Anunoby (35)	Hart, Towns (12)	Hart, Towns (11)	Madison Square Garden; 19,812	45–26
72	March 26	L.A. Clippers	L 113–126	Karl-Anthony Towns (34)	Karl-Anthony Towns (14)	Mikal Bridges (9)	Madison Square Garden; 19,812	45–27
73	March 28	@ Milwaukee	W 116–107	OG Anunoby (31)	Josh Hart (14)	Josh Hart (8)	Fiserv Forum; 17,605	46–27
74	March 30	Portland	W 110–93	Anunoby, Bridges (28)	Karl-Anthony Towns (11)	Josh Hart (9)	Madison Square Garden; 19,812	47–27

April: 4–4 (home: 2–2; road: 2–2)

Game	Date	Team	Score	High points	High rebounds	High assists	Location Attendance	Record
75	April 1	Philadelphia	W 105–91	OG Anunoby (27)	Mitchell Robinson (14)	Tyler Kolek (7)	Madison Square Garden; 19,314	48–27
76	April 2	@ Cleveland	L 105–124	Karl-Anthony Towns (25)	Karl-Anthony Towns (13)	Anunoby, Wright (6)	Rocket Arena; 19,432	48–28
77	April 5	@ Atlanta	W 121–105	Karl-Anthony Towns (30)	Karl-Anthony Towns (11)	Josh Hart (11)	State Farm Arena; 16,199	49–28
78	April 6	Phoenix	W 112–98	OG Anunoby (32)	Karl-Anthony Towns (13)	Brunson, Payne (6)	Madison Square Garden; 19,812	50–28
79	April 8	Boston	L 117–119 (OT)	Karl-Anthony Towns (34)	Karl-Anthony Towns (14)	Jalen Brunson (10)	Madison Square Garden; 19,812	50–29
80	April 10	@ Detroit	L 106–115	Karl-Anthony Towns (25)	Achiuwa, Towns (10)	Mikal Bridges (7)	Little Caesars Arena; 20,062	50–30
81	April 11	Cleveland	L 102–108	Jalen Brunson (27)	Josh Hart (11)	Mikal Bridges (8)	Madison Square Garden; 19,812	50–31
82	April 13	@ Brooklyn	W 113–105	Landry Shamet (29)	Precious Achiuwa (9)	Miles McBride (8)	Barclays Center; 17,926	51–31

2024–25 season schedule

=== Playoffs ===
2025 playoff game log
Total: 10–8 (home: 4–5; road: 6–3)
First Round: 4–2 (home: 1–2; road: 3–0)

Game	Date	Team	Score	High points	High rebounds	High assists	Location Attendance	Series
1	April 19	Detroit	W 123–112	Jalen Brunson (34)	Karl-Anthony Towns (11)	Jalen Brunson (8)	Madison Square Garden; 19,812	1–0
2	April 21	Detroit	L 94–100	Jalen Brunson (37)	Hart, Robinson (7)	Jalen Brunson (7)	Madison Square Garden; 19,812	1–1
3	April 24	@ Detroit	W 118–116	Karl-Anthony Towns (31)	Josh Hart (11)	Brunson, Hart (9)	Little Caesars Arena; 20,062	2–1
4	April 27	@ Detroit	W 94–93	Jalen Brunson (32)	Josh Hart (10)	Jalen Brunson (11)	Little Caesars Arena; 20,062	3–1
5	April 29	Detroit	L 103–106	OG Anunoby (19)	Robinson, Towns (11)	Jalen Brunson (7)	Madison Square Garden; 19,812	3–2
6	May 1	@ Detroit	W 116–113	Jalen Brunson (40)	Karl-Anthony Towns (15)	Jalen Brunson (7)	Little Caesars Arena; 20,062	4–2

Conference Semifinals: 4–2 (home: 2–1; road: 2–1)

Game	Date	Team	Score	High points	High rebounds	High assists	Location Attendance	Series
1	May 5	@ Boston	W 108–105 (OT)	Anunoby, Brunson (29)	Karl-Anthony Towns (13)	Mikal Bridges (7)	TD Garden; 19,156	1–0
2	May 7	@ Boston	W 91–90	Josh Hart (23)	Karl-Anthony Towns (17)	Jalen Brunson (7)	TD Garden; 19,156	2–0
3	May 10	Boston	L 93–115	Jalen Brunson (27)	Karl-Anthony Towns (15)	Jalen Brunson (7)	Madison Square Garden; 19,812	2–1
4	May 12	Boston	W 121–113	Jalen Brunson (39)	Karl-Anthony Towns (11)	Jalen Brunson (12)	Madison Square Garden; 19,812	3–1
5	May 14	@ Boston	L 102–127	Josh Hart (24)	Mitchell Robinson (13)	Jalen Brunson (6)	TD Garden; 19,156	3–2
6	May 16	Boston	W 119–81	Anunoby, Brunson (23)	Karl Anthony-Towns (12)	Josh Hart (11)	Madison Square Garden; 19,812	4–2

Conference Finals: 2–4 (home: 1–2; road: 1–2)

Game	Date	Team	Score	High points	High rebounds	High assists	Location Attendance	Series
1	May 21	Indiana	L 135–138 (OT)	Jalen Brunson (43)	Josh Hart (13)	Josh Hart (7)	Madison Square Garden; 19,812	0–1
2	May 23	Indiana	L 109–114	Jalen Brunson (36)	Mitchell Robinson (9)	Jalen Brunson (11)	Madison Square Garden; 19,812	0–2
3	May 25	@ Indiana	W 106–100	Karl-Anthony Towns (24)	Karl-Anthony Towns (15)	Josh Hart (4)	Gainbridge Fieldhouse; 17,274	1–2
4	May 27	@ Indiana	L 121–130	Jalen Brunson (31)	Karl-Anthony Towns (12)	Jalen Brunson (5)	Gainbridge Fieldhouse; 17,274	1–3
5	May 29	Indiana	W 111–94	Jalen Brunson (32)	Karl-Anthony Towns (13)	Bridges, Brunson (5)	Madison Square Garden; 19,812	2–3
6	May 31	@ Indiana	L 108–125	OG Anunoby (24)	Karl-Anthony Towns (14)	Jalen Brunson (7)	Gainbridge Fieldhouse; 17,274	2–4

2025 playoff schedule

=== NBA Cup ===
The groups were revealed during the tournament announcement on July 12, 2024.

==== East Group A ====
Pos	Team	Pld	W	L	PF	PA	PD	Qualification
1	New York Knicks	4	4	0	455	425	+30	Advance to knockout stage
2	Orlando Magic	4	3	1	441	396	+45	Advance to knockout stage
3	Philadelphia 76ers	4	2	2	408	411	−3	
4	Brooklyn Nets	4	1	3	436	475	−39	
5	Charlotte Hornets	4	0	4	406	439	−33	

Source: NBA
Rules for classification: Tiebreakers

== Player statistics ==
Legend
GP	Games played	GS	Games started	MPG	Minutes per game
FG%	Field-goal percentage	3P%	3-point field-goal percentage	FT%	Free-throw percentage
RPG	Rebounds per game	APG	Assists per game	SPG	Steals per game
BPG	Blocks per game	PPG	Points per game

=== Regular season ===
New York Knicks statistics
Player	GP	GS	MPG	FG%	3P%	FT%	RPG	APG	SPG	BPG	PPG
Precious Achiuwa	57	10	20.5	.502	.278	.594	5.6	1.0	.8	.7	6.6
OG Anunoby	74	74	36.6	.476	.372	.810	4.8	2.2	1.5	.9	18.0
MarJon Beauchamp^{†}	6	0	2.9	.455	.200	1.000	1.5	.2	.2	.0	2.5
Mikal Bridges	82	82	37.0	.500	.354	.814	3.2	3.7	.9	.5	17.6
Jalen Brunson	65	65	35.4	.488	.383	.821	2.9	7.3	.9	.1	26.0
Pacôme Dadiet	18	0	6.2	.323	.316	.667	1.0	.3	.2	.1	1.7
Josh Hart	77	77	37.6	.525	.333	.776	9.6	5.9	1.5	.4	13.6
Ariel Hukporti	25	1	8.7	.677		.462	2.0	.4	.0	.6	1.9
Tyler Kolek	41	0	7.2	.329	.298	.765	.7	1.7	.3	.1	2.0
Miles McBride	64	10	24.9	.406	.369	.813	2.5	2.9	1.0	.3	9.5
Kevin McCullar Jr.	4	0	7.3	.286	.000	1.000	2.0	.5	.3	.3	1.5
Cameron Payne	72	5	15.1	.401	.363	.907	1.4	2.8	.5	.2	6.9
Mitchell Robinson	17	3	17.1	.661		.684	5.9	.8	.9	1.1	5.1
Matt Ryan	19	0	3.6	.323	.316	1.000	.4	.2	.1	.0	1.5
Landry Shamet	50	0	15.2	.461	.397	.667	1.2	.5	.5	.0	5.7
Jericho Sims^{†}	39	5	10.8	.609		.615	3.3	.6	.2	.3	1.6
Jacob Toppin^{†}	16	0	3.1	.300	.000		.7	.3	.1	.0	.4
Karl-Anthony Towns	72	72	35.0	.526	.420	.829	12.8	3.1	1.0	.7	24.4
P.J. Tucker^{†}	3	1	19.3	.429	.500		2.7	.0	.3	.3	3.0
Anton Watson	9	0	2.4	.444	.000		.3	.2	.1	.0	.9
Delon Wright^{†}	14	5	16.4	.469	.333	.667	1.4	2.1	.9	.2	4.3

=== Playoffs ===
New York Knicks statistics
Player	GP	GS	MPG	FG%	3P%	FT%	RPG	APG	SPG	BPG	PPG
Precious Achiuwa	8	0	4.2	.488	.000	.385	4.2	.6	.4	1.3	5.2
OG Anunoby	18	18	39.2	.417	.339	.810	4.6	1.3	2.0	1.2	16.3
Mikal Bridges	18	18	39.2	.292	.400	.571	4.5	2.9	1.7	.9	15.6
Jalen Brunson	18	18	37.8	.444	.310	.775	3.4	7.0	.4	.3	29.4
Pacôme Dadiet	2	0	2.2	1.000			.0	.0	.0	.0	1.0
Josh Hart	18	14	35.7	.472	.370	.776	8.8	4.4	1.1	.6	11.6
Ariel Hukporti	3	0	1.5	1.000		.000	.7	.0	.0	.0	1.3
Tyler Kolek	3	0	2.2	1.000	1.000		.3	1.0	.0	.0	1.0
Miles McBride	18	0	19.0	.378	.373	.824	1.2	1.0	.4	.1	5.8
Cameron Payne	14	0	7.3	.324	.238	.333	.6	.6	.4	.1	2.1
Mitchell Robinson	18	4	20.6	.608		.393	7.1	.4	.9	.8	4.7
Landry Shamet	11	0	7.5	.450	.467	.250	.4	.7	.1	.0	2.4
Karl-Anthony Towns	18	18	35.5	.488	.351	.845	11.6	1.3	.7	.7	21.4
P.J. Tucker	1	0	4.4				.0	.0	.0	.0	.0
Delon Wright	6	0	8.0	.222	.167	1.000	.3	.8	.5	.2	1.2

- ^{†} Denotes player spent time with another team in the season. Stats reflect time with the Knicks only.

== Transactions ==
=== Trades ===
June 26, 2024	To New York Knicks Rights to Dillon Jones (No. 26); 2024 PHX second-round pick (No. 51)	To Washington Wizards Draft rights to Kyshawn George (No. 24)
June 26, 2024	To New York Knicks 2025 second-round pick 2026 GSW second-round pick 2027 MIN second-round pick 2027 second-round pick 2027 second-round pick	To Oklahoma City Thunder Draft rights to Dillon Jones (No. 26)
June 27, 2024	To New York Knicks Draft rights to Tyler Kolek (No. 34)	To Portland Trail Blazers Draft rights to Dani Díez (2016 No. 54); 2027 MIN second-round pick 2029 second-round pick 2030 NYK second-round pick
June 27, 2024	To New York Knicks Draft rights to Oso Ighodaro (No. 40); Cash considerations	To Oklahoma City Thunder Draft rights to Ajay Mitchell (No. 38)
June 27, 2024	To New York Knicks Draft rights to Kevin McCullar Jr. (No. 56); 2028 BOS protected second-round pick	To Phoenix Suns Draft rights to Oso Ighodaro (No. 40)
June 27, 2024	To New York Knicks Draft rights to Ariel Hukporti (No. 58); Draft rights to Petteri Koponen (2007 No. 30); Cash considerations	To Dallas Mavericks Draft rights to Melvin Ajinça (No. 51)
July 6, 2024	To New York Knicks Keita Bates-Diop; Mikal Bridges; Draft rights to Juan Pablo Vaulet (2015 No. 39); 2026 second-round pick	To Brooklyn Nets Bojan Bogdanović; Mamadi Diakite; Shake Milton (sign-and-trade); 2025 MIL protected first-round pick 2025 NYK first-round pick 2025 BKN second-round pick 2027 NYK first-round pick 2028 NYK first-round pick swap 2029 NYK first-round pick 2031 NYK first-round pick
October 2, 2024	Three-team trade
October 2, 2024	To New York Knicks Karl-Anthony Towns (from Minnesota); Draft rights to James Nnaji (2023 No. 31) (from Charlotte)	To Minnesota Timberwolves Keita Bates-Diop (from New York); Donte DiVincenzo (from New York); Julius Randle (from New York); 2025 DET first-round pick (from New York)
October 2, 2024	To Charlotte Hornets Charlie Brown Jr. (from New York); DaQuan Jeffries (from New York); Duane Washington Jr. (from New York); 2025 MIN second-round pick (from Minnesota); 2026 GSW second-round pick (from New York); 2031 NYK second-round pick (from New York); Cash considerations (from New York)

=== Free agency ===
==== Re-signed ====
Player	Signed	Ref.
OG Anunoby	July 6, 2024	

==== Subtractions ====
Player	Reason	New Team	Signed	Ref.
Alec Burks	Free agent	Miami Heat	July 4, 2024	
Isaiah Hartenstein	Free agent	Oklahoma City Thunder	July 6, 2024	
Shake Milton	Sign-and-trade	Brooklyn Nets	July 6, 2024	
