= Darren Erman =

American basketball coach

New York Knicks
- Position: Assistant coach
- League: NBA

Personal information
- Born: Louisville, Kentucky, U.S.

Career information
- College: Emory
- Coaching career: 2003–present

Career history

Coaching
- 2003–2005: St. Anthony HS (assistant)
- 2005–2007: Brandeis (assistant)
- 2007–2010: Boston Celtics (assistant)
- 2010–2014: Golden State Warriors (assistant)
- 2014–2015: Boston Celtics (assistant)
- 2015–2018: New Orleans Pelicans (assistant)
- 2019–2020: Maine Red Claws
- 2020–present: New York Knicks (assistant)

Career highlights
- NBA champion (2008, 2026); NBA Cup champion (2025)

Darren Erman is an American basketball coach who serves as assistant coach for the New York Knicks of the National Basketball Association (NBA).

== Early career ==
Erman grew up in Louisville, Kentucky. He attended Emory University where he served as student coach, graduating in 1997. After attending law school, he served as a corporate lawyer for Latham & Watkins while maintaining connections to basketball. Soon Erman left the legal industry to serve as assistant coach at St. Anthony High School from 2003 to 2005. In 2005, Erman returned to the NCAA Division III to coach at Brandeis University.

== Professional career ==
In 2008, Erman joined the Boston Celtics, helping Doc Rivers lead the Celtics to win an NBA championship in 2008 and the Eastern Conference championship in 2010. Erman joined the Golden State Warriors in 2010 alongside Mark Jackson. On April 6, 2014, it was announced the Warriors had decided to part ways with Erman, citing a "violation of company policy" for having secretly recorded conversations between players, coaches, and front office staff.

On September 13, 2019, Erman was hired as the head coach of the Maine Red Claws.

On November 25, 2020, Erman was hired as an assistant coach for the New York Knicks under head coach Tom Thibodeau.
