= NBA Cup =

Regular-season tournament of the National Basketball Association

- Founded: 2023
- Number of teams: 30 total; 15 per conference
- Current champions: New York Knicks (1st title) (2025)
- Most championships: Los Angeles Lakers; Milwaukee Bucks; New York Knicks (1 title each)
- TV partners: United States: ESPN (Group Play Games only); NBC/Peacock (Group Play games only); Amazon Prime Video; Canada: TSN; Sportsnet; NBA TV Canada
- Website: nba.com/nba-cup/
- 2026 NBA Cup

The NBA Cup is an annual National Basketball Association (NBA) tournament during the regular season. It was officially announced on July 8, 2023, and debuted during the 2023–24 NBA season. The first edition of the event was called the In-Season Tournament.

The format is a multi-stage tournament beginning with group play followed by single-elimination knockout rounds. Group play consists of three groups of five teams per conference, for a total of six groups including all 30 NBA teams. Each team plays four group stage games, which count towards both the NBA Cup group standings and the regular season standings. The winners of each group, along with one wild card team from each conference, advance to the knockout rounds. For the first three editions of the tournament, the final two rounds of the knockout stage were played at a neutral site. Starting with the 2026 edition, only the championship game is played at a neutral site.

The winning team receives the trophy, also called the NBA Cup, and each winning player receives a cash prize. The first winner of the NBA Cup was the Los Angeles Lakers, with the tournament MVP being LeBron James.

== History ==
NBA officials discussed the possibility of holding an in-season tournament for at least 15 years before it was introduced. The NBA has been concerned for decades about trying to compete with the National Football League (NFL) for viewers and attention when the two leagues’ regular seasons overlap during November and December each year.

On July 6, 2023, the NBA announced it would hold the first in-season tournament from November 3 to December 9. The details of the tournament were revealed by the NBA on July 8; the group draws were announced and the semifinals and championship were scheduled at T-Mobile Arena on the Las Vegas Strip. The Los Angeles Lakers defeated the Indiana Pacers in the championship game to win the inaugural NBA Cup.

The second edition of the NBA Cup was held from November 12 to December 17, 2024, with the semifinals and championship hosted at T-Mobile Arena for the second consecutive year. The Milwaukee Bucks defeated the Oklahoma City Thunder to win the second NBA Cup championship game.

The third edition of the NBA Cup was held from October 31 to December 16, 2025, with the semifinals and championship hosted at T-Mobile Arena for the third consecutive year. The New York Knicks defeated the San Antonio Spurs to win the third NBA Cup championship game. The Knicks later won the 2026 NBA Finals over the Spurs, marking the first NBA Finals to feature the two finalists in the NBA Cup championship game, and making the Knicks the first franchise to achieve the league "double" of winning both the NBA Cup and NBA championship in the same season.

The 2026 NBA Cup runs from October 30 to December 11, with the championship game at Hinkle Fieldhouse in Indianapolis, Indiana, as part of the NBA's new plan to hold them at iconic basketball arenas.

== Sponsorship ==
On February 2, 2024, the Middle Eastern airline company Emirates announced a multi-year deal with the NBA including the naming rights of the NBA Cup. On December 13, 2024, Refugees International urged the NBA to suspend its partnership with the UAE due to its role in inciting the Sudanese civil war. The organization stated that instead of legitimizing the UAE through sponsorship, the NBA should reevaluate its partnership with the Emirates and use its influence to pressure it to end the involvement in the Sudan war. Similar concerns were raised during the preseason games hosted by the NBA in Abu Dhabi on October 4–6, 2024. The Human Rights Watch had accused the NBA of "sportswashing" the UAE's human rights record and urged it to cancel the games over the Emirati involvement in the Sudan war.

== Format ==
The tournament has a similar format to in-season, multi-stage tournaments such as WNBA Commissioner's Cup and those held in association football. The tournament rules are as follows:

- Each conference is divided into three groups with five teams each, for a total of six groups. The top three teams (by previous-season record) are randomly assigned to the three conference groups, then the next three are randomly assigned, and so on.
- Round Robin tournament in each group: each team plays one game against each of the other teams in its group, for a total of four games (two at home and two on the road). These games also count as regular season games.
- Four teams from each conference advance to a knockout tournament: the three pool winners in addition to the group runner-up with the best record as a wild card.
- The Quarterfinal games are hosted by the two teams with the best record in Group Play games for each conference, and the team with the best record in Group Play games host the wild card team. If two or more teams are tied for the higher seed in a conference, the tie will be broken following the tiebreaker protocol described below.
- For the 2023 to 2025 editions, the semifinals and championship game were held at a neutral site: T-Mobile Arena in Paradise, Nevada. Starting in 2026, semifinals will also be held at the home arenas of each conference's higher-seed. The final round will continue to be played at a neutral site, under a new plan to hold them at iconic basketball arenas.
- The championship game does not count as a regular season game.
- Players on teams playing in the knockout stage receive prize money, with the amount increasing depending on how far their team advances. The prize money has changed from season-to-season.

In the event two or more teams are tied within a group at the end of the Group Play, the tie will be broken according to the following tiebreakers (in sequential order):

- Head-to-head record in the Group Stage
- Point differential in the Group Stage
- Total points scored in the Group Stage
- Regular season record from the previous NBA regular season
- Random drawing (if two or more teams are still tied following the previous tiebreakers)

If two or more teams are tied for the wild card in a conference, after group tiebreakers are resolved, the wild-card tie will be broken following the same tiebreakers described above (with the exception of the head-to-head record in the Group Stage).

The National Basketball Players Association (NBPA), the players' union, said in 2023 that many players objected to the use of point differential and points scored as tiebreakers. These tiebreakers, according to one report, encouraged teams to run up the score, in violation of the sport's unwritten rules. Players, coaches, and other league employees have suggested alternative tiebreakers, such as limiting point differential to a maximum value per game, or using the number of quarters in which a team outscored its opponent.

== Uniforms and courts ==
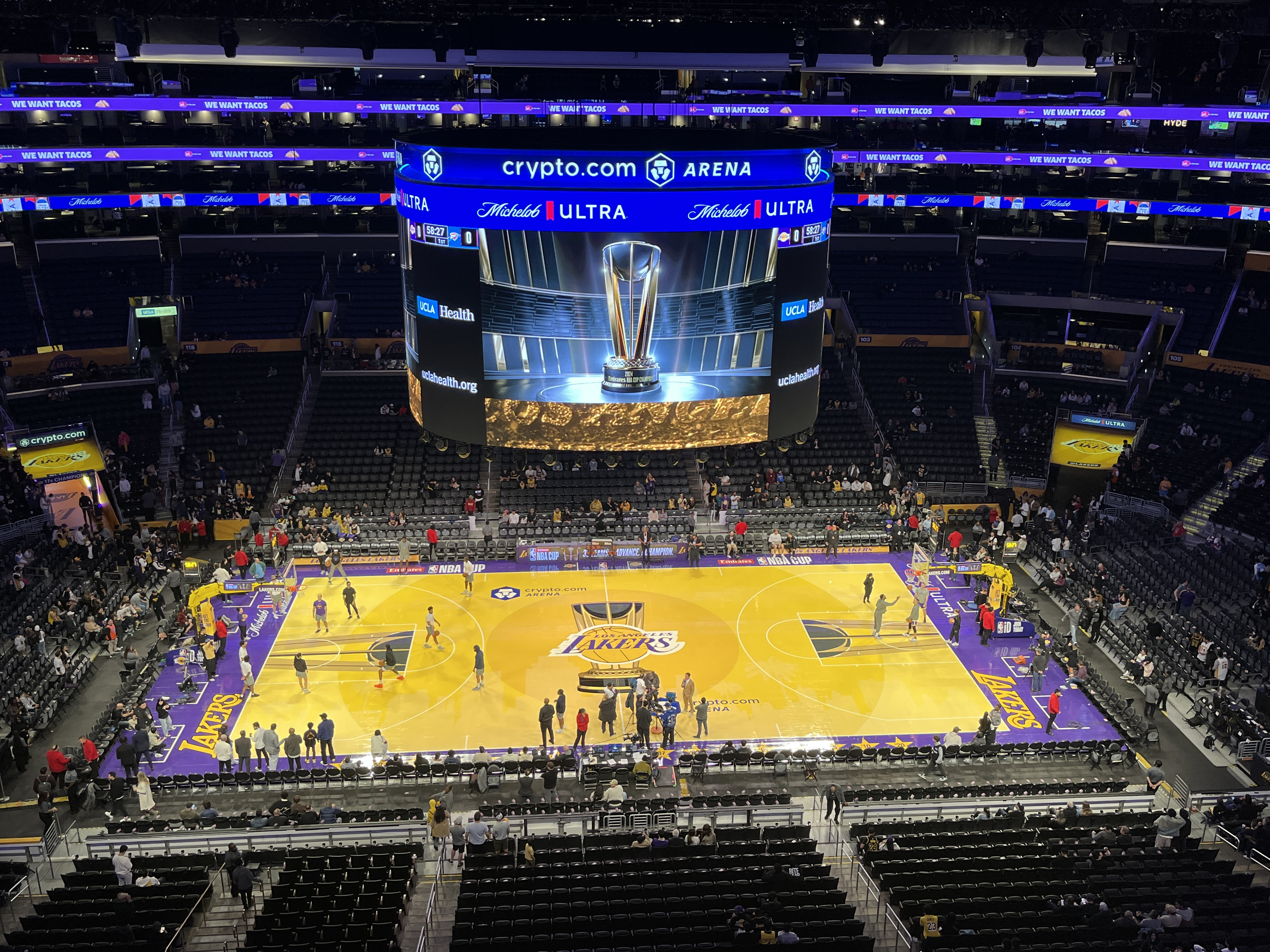
NBA Cup Court at a Los Angeles Lakers game in 2024

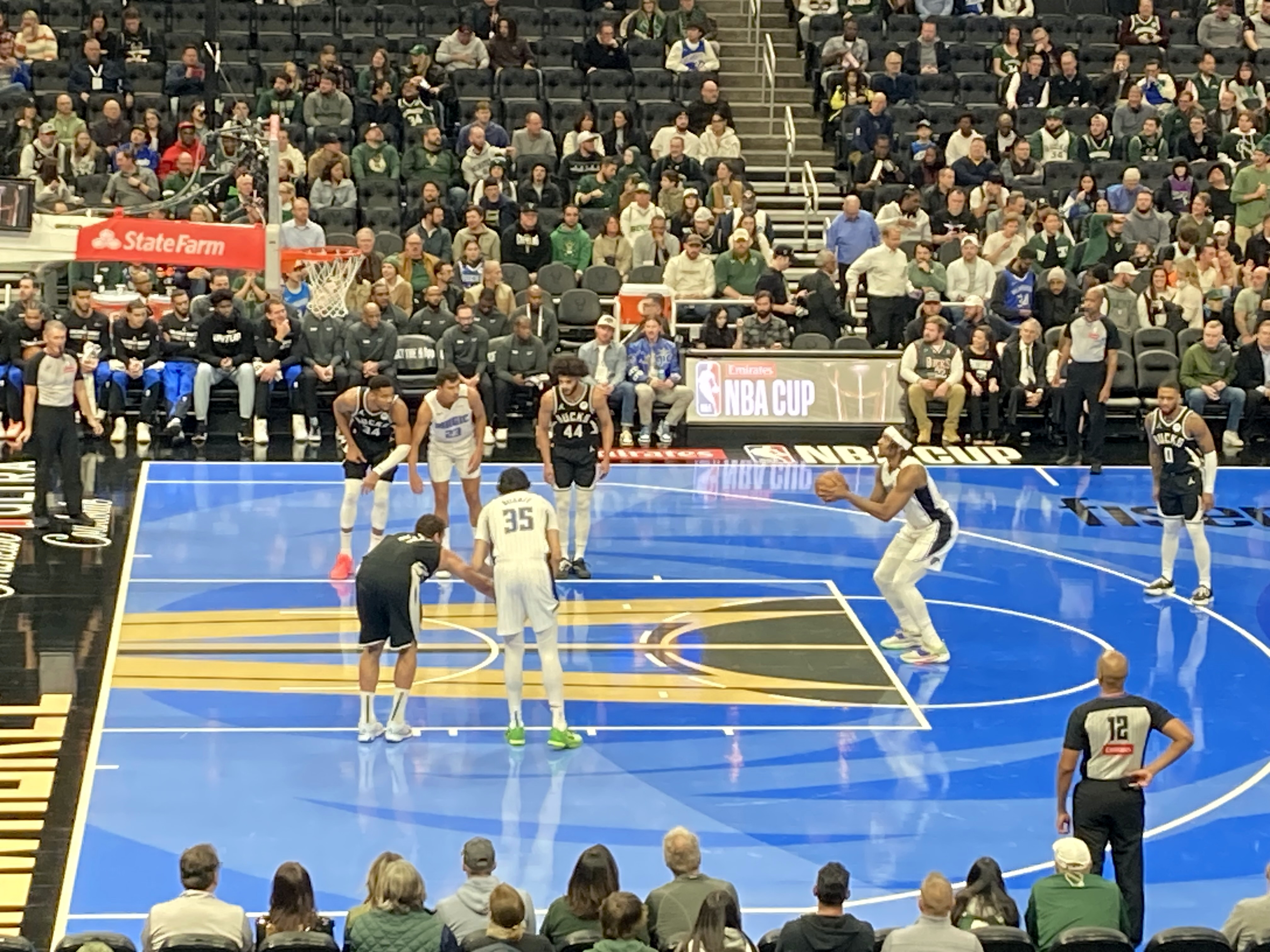
A free throw attempt during the Orlando Magic at Milwaukee Bucks 2024 NBA Cup game, with the free-throw lane painted with a silhouette of the trophy

In the Inaugural In-Season Tournament in 2023, home teams wore the "City" edition uniforms. The courts also featured a fully painted maple surface with a contrasting middle color strip painted from each end of the free-throw lane. The NBA Cup was displayed at center court, and silhouettes of the trophy were also painted on the free-throw lanes. The court designs were based on the home team's "City" uniform for that season.

Not all teams were able to play on their new NBA Cup courts. The Dallas Mavericks' two home NBA Cup games in 2023 were played on more traditional basketball courts due to manufacturing issues affecting their NBA Cup court.

Reactions to the unique court designs were mixed, with Mavericks owner Mark Cuban saying he "wasn't a fan" of the courts, though he did admit that they were a "brilliant marketing idea". Some players, including Jaylen Brown and Luka Dončić, complained that the new courts were slippery. Some fans complained on social media that the courts were too bright and distracting.

For the semifinal and final rounds at T-Mobile Arena in Las Vegas, the tournament court was blue with a red middle strip. However, despite playing all tournament games in their black "City" uniforms through the quarterfinals, the Los Angeles Lakers were forced to wear their gold "Icon" uniforms in the semifinal round due to lack of contrast with the court, against the wishes of Lakers players. The Indiana Pacers were also hit with the same restriction.

Starting with the 2024 NBA Cup, home teams wore the "Statement" edition uniforms and road teams wear the "Association" edition uniforms.^{[a]}^{[b]} The courts used for the 2024 tournament featured a fully painted maple surface with three concentric circles. The NBA Cup is displayed at center court, and silhouettes of the trophy are also painted on the free-throw lanes. The court designs contrast with the home team's "Statement" uniform for that particular season.

The 2024 semifinal and final round court featured a similar aesthetic as the team-specific NBA Cup courts for that year, with bracket motifs complementing the three concentric circles and blue and red gradients representing the Eastern and Western Conferences respectively.

The courts used in the 2025 NBA Cup were again based on each team's "Statement" uniform, but with personalized overlays representing each team's identities. Previous Cup champions Los Angeles Lakers and Milwaukee Bucks have a slight variation to their NBA Cup court, adding the year within the base of the cup trophy at center court to signify the season in which the team won the NBA Cup. For the semifinal and final games at Las Vegas, the court featured a 5x5 mosaic pattern and a stylized bracket pattern at center court.

The courts for the 2026 NBA Cup were inspired by Nike's Standard Issue Collection, with oversized wordmarks based on the collection superimposed on each end of the court. A new design element adorned the bottom corner of each three-point line, with the phrase "30 Teams. 8 Advance. 1 Champion".

Due to slippery conditions involving their NBA Cup court, the Lakers used their normal court for their cup game against the Dallas Mavericks on November 28, as well as the quarterfinal game against the San Antonio Spurs. The Orlando Magic also used their normal court for their quarterfinal game against the Miami Heat after their NBA Cup court was damaged during storage.

== Impact on the regular season ==
With the exception of the championship game, all games in the tournament are counted as regular season games.

To adjust for the differing number of games played by different teams, the NBA's regular season scheduling formula is modified so only 80 games for each team are initially announced prior to the beginning of the season, with two other scheduled games announced at the end of the group stage:

- The 22 teams who do not qualify for the knockout rounds of the tournament play two additional games, one at home and one on the road, against other teams eliminated prior to the knockout rounds. These games occur during the Knockout Rounds on days when NBA Cup games are not scheduled.
- The four teams who lose in the quarterfinals play one additional game against the opponent from the same conference on the day before the tournament Championship Game.

== Winners ==
- The first parentheses in the Western champions and Eastern champions columns indicate the teams' playoff seed. The second parentheses indicate the number of times that teams have appeared in an NBA Cup Finals as well as each respective team's Finals record to date.

**Bold**	Winning team of the NBA Cup

Season	Date	Western champion	Coach	Result	Eastern champion	Coach	Tournament MVP	U.S. TV viewership	Reference
2023–24	December 9, 2023	**Los Angeles Lakers** (1) (1, 1–0)	Darvin Ham	123–109	Indiana Pacers (2) (1, 0–1)	Rick Carlisle	LeBron James	4.58 million	
2024–25	December 17, 2024	Oklahoma City Thunder (1) (1, 0–1)	Mark Daigneault	81–97	**Milwaukee Bucks** (1) (1, 1–0)	Doc Rivers	Giannis Antetokounmpo	2.99 million	
2025–26	December 16, 2025	San Antonio Spurs (3) (1, 0–1)	Mitch Johnson	113–124	**New York Knicks** (Note: Also won the NBA Finals in the same season.) (3) (1, 1–0)	Mike Brown	Jalen Brunson	3.07 million	
2026-27									

=== Results by team (Championship Games) ===
Team	Win	Loss	Apps	Pct	Year(s) won	Year(s) lost
Los Angeles Lakers	1	0	1	1.000	2023	—
Milwaukee Bucks	1	0	1	1.000	2024	—
New York Knicks	1	0	1	1.000	2025	—
Indiana Pacers	0	1	1	.000	—	2023
Oklahoma City Thunder	0	1	1	.000	—	2024
San Antonio Spurs	0	1	1	.000	—	2025

== History Teams Performance ==
EASTERN CONFERENCE	2023		2024		2025		Group Stage	Knockout rounds	Total
Atlanta Hawks	1-3 4th gA		3-1 1st gC	Eastern finalist	2-2 2nd gA		6-6	1-1	7-7
Boston Celtics	3-1 1st gC	Eastern semifinalist	3-1 2nd gC		2-2 2nd gB		8-4	0-1	8-5
Brooklyn Nets	3-1 3rd gC		1-3 4th gA		1-3 5th gB		5-7		5-7
Charlotte Hornets	1-3 4th gB		0-4 5th gA		1-3 4th gC		2-10		2-10
Chicago Bulls	0-4 5th gC		2-2 4th gC		1-3 5th gC		3-9		3-9
Cleveland Cavaliers	3-1 2nd gA		2-2 3rd gC		2-2 3rd gA		7-5		7-5
Detroit Pistons	0-4 5th gA		3-1 2nd gB		2-2 3rd gB		5-7		5-7
Indiana Pacers	4-0 1st gA	Runner-up	0-4 5th gB		1-3 4th gA		5-7	2-1	7-8
Miami Heat	2-2 3rd gB		2-2 3rd gB		3-1 2nd gC	Eastern semifinalist	7-5	0-1	7-6
Milwaukee Bucks	4-0 1st gB	Eastern finalist	4-0 1st gB	CHAMPION	2-2 3rd gC		10-2	5-1	15-3
New York Knicks	3-1 2nd gB	Eastern semifinalist	4-0 1st gA	Eastern semifinalist	3-1 1st gC	CHAMPION	10-2	3-2	13-4
Orlando Magic	3-1 2nd gC		3-1 2nd gA	Eastern semifinalist	4-0 1st gB	Eastern finalist	10-2	1-2	11-4
Philadelphia 76ers	2-2 3rd gA		2-2 3rd gA		1-3 4th gB		5-7		5-7
Toronto Raptors	1-3 4th gC		1-3 4th gB		4-0 1st gA	Eastern semifinalist	6-6	0-1	6-7
Washington Wizards	0-4 5th gB		0-4 5th gC		1-3 5th gA		1-11		1-11

WESTERN CONFERENCE	2023		2024		2025		Group Stage	Knockout rounds	Total
Dallas Mavericks	2-2 3rd gB		3-1 2nd gC	Western semifinalist	1-3 4th gB		6-6	0-1	6-7
Denver Nuggets	2-2 4th gB		2-2 3rd gC		2-2 2nd gC		6-6		6-6
Golden State Warriors	2-2 3rd gC		3-1 1st gC	Western semifinalist	1-3 5th gC		6-6	0-1	6-7
Houston Rockets	2-2 2nd gB		3-1 1st gA	Western finalist	2-2 3rd gC		7-5	1-1	8-6
Los Angeles Clippers	1-3 5th gB		2-2 2nd gA		2-2 3rd gB		5-7		5-7
Los Angeles Lakers	4-0 1st gA	CHAMPION	2-2 3rd gB		4-0 1st gB	Western semifinalist	10-2	3-1	13-3
Memphis Grizzlies	0-4 5th gA		1-3 4th gC		3-1 2nd gB		4-8		4-8
Minnesota Timberwolves	3-1 2nd gC		2-2 3rd gA		2-2 3rd gA		7-5		7-5
New Orleans Pelicans	3-1 1st gB	Western finalist	1-3 5th gC		0-4 5th gB		4-8	1-1	5-9
Oklahoma City Thunder	2-2 4th gC		3-1 1st gB	Runner-up	4-0 1st gA	Western finalist	9-3	3-2	12-5
Phoenix Suns	3-1 2nd gA	Western semifinalist	3-1 2nd gB		3-1 2nd gA	Western semifinalist	9-3	0-2	9-5
Portland Trail Blazers	1-3 4th gA		2-2 4th gA		2-2 4th gC		5-7		5-7
Sacramento Kings	4-0 1st gC	Western semifinalist	1-3 5th gA		0-4 5th gA		5-7	0-1	5-8
San Antonio Spurs	0-4 5th gC		2-2 4th gB		3-1 1st gC	Runner-up	5-7	2-1	7-8
Utah Jazz	2-2 3rd gA		0-4 5th gB		1-3 4th gA		3-9		3-9

== Awards ==
After the tournament, the league awards the NBA Cup trophy, NBA Cup Most Valuable Player award, championship medals, and an All-Tournament Team.

=== Trophy ===
The winning team of the tournament receives the NBA Cup. The trophy is designed by Victor Solomon and created by Tiffany & Co. It is 35 pounds (16 kg) of sterling silver, vermeil, coated with 24 karat gold, black ceramic and stands at 23 inches (58 cm) tall symbolizing the year the tournament was created. The design features a black cup surrounded by eight gold prongs and a base inspired by the new conference championship trophies. The eight prongs are in reference to the eight teams that qualify for the knockout round. The base design includes 30 net openings which represent the 30 teams in the league.

=== All-NBA Cup teams and MVPs ===
The winner of the Most Valuable Player award is decided by members of a selected media panel, as well as by online fan votes. In the inaugural tournament, 20 votes were decided by media members while 5 votes were decided by fans.

Players in bold were the NBA Cup MVP. Numbers in parentheses denote the number of All-NBA Cup Team selections up to and including that year. Giannis Antetokounmpo and Shai Gilgeous-Alexander are the only players to appear in the below list twice.

Year	Players	Teams	Ref.
2023	Giannis Antetokounmpo	Milwaukee Bucks	
2023	Anthony Davis	Los Angeles Lakers	
2023	Kevin Durant	Phoenix Suns	
2023	Tyrese Haliburton	Indiana Pacers	
2023	**LeBron James**	Los Angeles Lakers	
2024	**Giannis Antetokounmpo** (2)	Milwaukee Bucks	
2024	Shai Gilgeous-Alexander	Oklahoma City Thunder	
2024	Damian Lillard	Milwaukee Bucks	
2024	Alperen Şengün	Houston Rockets	
2024	Trae Young	Atlanta Hawks	
2025	**Jalen Brunson**	New York Knicks	
2025	Luka Dončić	Los Angeles Lakers	
2025	De'Aaron Fox	San Antonio Spurs	
2025	Shai Gilgeous-Alexander (2)	Oklahoma City Thunder	
2025	Karl-Anthony Towns	New York Knicks	

== Media coverage ==
In 2023 and 2024, TNT and ESPN aired Group Stage games as part of their regular Tuesday and Friday night coverage, respectively. NBA TV also aired Black Friday games. TNT then aired most quarterfinal games, with the exception of one game on ESPN in 2024. The semifinals were split, with TNT televising one game per year, and ESPN or ABC airing the other. ABC aired the championship game in both years.

Beginning with the 2025 Cup, Prime Video airs the majority of group play games, with the majority of these games moved to Friday evenings. Two extra Cup Nights were also designated to both NBC/Peacock and ESPN. All knockout round games air on Prime Video, coexisting with regional broadcasts. NBC/Peacock's two games air on the Tuesday before Thanksgiving and are carried as part of its Coast 2 Coast Tuesday coverage, while ESPN carries a tripleheader on the night before Thanksgiving.

== Notes ==
- ^{a} In the 2024 NBA Cup Final, the Milwaukee Bucks wore their black "Statement" uniform, while the Oklahoma City Thunder wore their orange "Statement" uniform, as prescribed by the league given the game's neutral site designation.
- ^{b} In 2025, the San Antonio Spurs changed their "Statement" uniform to a silver base; as such, road teams visiting San Antonio were assigned to wear the primary color "Icon" uniform in subsequent NBA Cup qualifying games as opposed to the white "Association" uniform in order to provide sufficient contrast. For the 2025 NBA Cup semifinal game, the Oklahoma City Thunder wore their orange "Statement" uniform against the Spurs in their silver "Statement" uniform, and in the Cup Final, the Spurs (silver) and the New York Knicks (black) both wore their "Statement" uniforms, as prescribed by the league given the game's neutral site designation.
