= 2025–26 Milwaukee Bucks season =

2025–26 NBA season by team

- Head coach: Doc Rivers
- President: Peter Feigin
- General manager: Jon Horst
- Owners: Wesley Edens; Jimmy Haslam
- Arena: Fiserv Forum

Results
- Record: 32–50 (.390)
- Place: Division: 3rd (Central); Conference: 11th (Eastern)
- Playoff finish: Did not qualify
- Stats at Basketball Reference

Local media
- Television: FanDuel Sports Network Wisconsin; Weigel Broadcasting (Note: Affiliates include: WMLW-TV (Milwaukee); WMEI (Green Bay); WECX (La Crosse/Eau Claire); WYOW (Wausau); WISC-TV (Madison)) (8 simulcasts)
- Radio: WTMJ

The 2025–26 Milwaukee Bucks season was the 58th season for the franchise in the National Basketball Association (NBA). This was the Bucks first full season since the 2012–13 season that Khris Middleton was not on the roster, for first time since the 2017–18 season that Pat Connaughton and Brook Lopez were not on their opening day roster, and for first time since the 2022–23 season that Damian Lillard was not on the opening day roster. Middleton was traded to the Washington Wizards during the 2024–25 midseason for Kyle Kuzma, whereas Connaughton was traded to the Charlotte Hornets and Lopez signed with the Los Angeles Clippers. Following the Bucks' shocking decision to waive Lillard, he returned to his old team, the Portland Trail Blazers, although it has been confirmed he would be missing the entire season due to rehabilitation on his torn Achilles.

The Bucks entered the season as the defending NBA Cup champions. However, for the first time, they did not play in the NBA Cup knockout round as they were eliminated by the eventual Cup champions New York Knicks in their final group stage game on November 28, having made two consecutive trips to Las Vegas in the past two seasons.

The Bucks began the year on a promising 5–2 start, but suffered a seven-game losing streak in November following a groin strain suffered by star power forward and franchise icon Giannis Antetokounmpo. After three games in his return, Antetokounmpo suffered a calf strain in a game against the Detroit Pistons and would be ruled out indefinitely. Ironically, the injury occurred at a similar time to trade rumors around the former MVP after he had deleted all social media content related to his Bucks tenure. Nonetheless, the Bucks ended up keeping Antetokounmpo on the roster at the end of the trade deadline, though they would trade away Cole Anthony and Amir Coffey at the deadline in exchange for Nigel Hayes-Davis and Ousmane Dieng.

On March 4, following a loss to the Atlanta Hawks, the Bucks failed to improve on their 48–34 record from the previous season. On March 23, following a loss to the Los Angeles Clippers, the Bucks guaranteed their first losing season since 2015–16. With a blowout loss to the San Antonio Spurs on March 28, Milwaukee failed to qualify for the playoffs for the first time since 2016.

This was the Bucks' final season with Antetokounmpo, as he was subsequently traded to the Miami Heat in the off-season.

== Draft ==
Round	Pick	Player	Position(s)	Nationality	College / Club
2	47	Bogoljub Marković	Power Forward	Serbia	KK Mega MIS (Serbia)

The Bucks entered the draft with only one second-round pick. Originally a Detroit Pistons selection, the pick was acquired from the Washington Wizards as part of the Khris Middleton trade in February 2025; it became the second most favorable pick after the Bucks finished between Detroit and the Phoenix Suns later that season. They have previously traded away their original first-round pick to the New Orleans Pelicans via pick swap in the 2020 Jrue Holiday trade (which was eventually conveyed to the Brooklyn Nets for falling outside the top-4 protection when the Bucks made the 2025 NBA playoffs) and their second-round pick to the Cleveland Cavaliers.

== Roster ==
2025–26 Milwaukee Bucks roster
Players

Pos.	No.	Player	Height	Weight	DOB	From
F	29	Alex Antetokounmpo (TW)	6 ft 8 in (2.03 m)	214 lb (97 kg)	2001-08-27	Greece
F	34	Giannis Antetokounmpo	6 ft 11 in (2.11 m)	243 lb (110 kg)	1994-12-06	Greece
F	43	Thanasis Antetokounmpo	6 ft 7 in (2.01 m)	219 lb (99 kg)	1992-07-18	Greece
F	21	Ousmane Dieng	6 ft 9 in (2.06 m)	185 lb (84 kg)	2003-05-21	France
G	20	A. J. Green	6 ft 4 in (1.93 m)	190 lb (86 kg)	1999-09-27	Northern Iowa
G	11	Gary Harris	6 ft 4 in (1.93 m)	210 lb (95 kg)	1994-09-14	Michigan State
G	44	Andre Jackson Jr.	6 ft 6 in (1.98 m)	209 lb (95 kg)	2001-11-13	Connecticut
F	18	Kyle Kuzma	6 ft 8 in (2.03 m)	221 lb (100 kg)	1995-07-24	Utah
F	35	Pete Nance	6 ft 9 in (2.06 m)	225 lb (102 kg)	2000-02-19	North Carolina
G	7	Kevin Porter Jr.	6 ft 5 in (1.96 m)	203 lb (92 kg)	2000-05-04	USC
F	9	Bobby Portis	6 ft 9 in (2.06 m)	250 lb (113 kg)	1995-02-10	Arkansas
F	12	Taurean Prince (injured)	6 ft 6 in (1.98 m)	218 lb (99 kg)	1994-03-22	Baylor
G	13	Ryan Rollins	6 ft 3 in (1.91 m)	180 lb (82 kg)	2002-07-03	Toledo
G	30	Cormac Ryan (TW)	6 ft 5 in (1.96 m)	200 lb (91 kg)	1998-10-26	North Carolina
C	00	Jericho Sims	6 ft 10 in (2.08 m)	250 lb (113 kg)	1998-10-20	Texas
G	5	Gary Trent Jr.	6 ft 5 in (1.96 m)	204 lb (93 kg)	1999-01-18	Duke
C	3	Myles Turner	6 ft 11 in (2.11 m)	250 lb (113 kg)	1996-03-24	Texas

Coaches
Head coach
- Doc Rivers
Assistant(s)
- Vin Baker
- Greg Buckner
- Pete Dominguez
- Darvin Ham
- Jack Herum
- Dave Joerger
- Rex Kalamian
- Jason Love
- Spencer Rivers

Legend
- (DP) Unsigned draft pick
- (FA) Free agent
- (S) Suspended
- (GL) On assignment to G League affiliate
- (TW) Two-way affiliate player
- Injured

Roster
Updated: March 22, 2026

== Standings ==
=== Division ===
Central Division	W	L	PCT	GB	Home	Road	Div	GP
c – Detroit Pistons	60	22	.732	–	32‍–‍9	28‍–‍13	12‍–‍4	82
x – Cleveland Cavaliers	52	30	.634	8.0	27‍–‍14	25‍–‍16	10‍–‍5	82
Milwaukee Bucks	32	50	.390	28.0	19‍–‍22	13‍–‍28	9‍–‍7	82
Chicago Bulls	31	51	.378	29.0	18‍–‍23	13‍–‍28	4‍–‍12	82
Indiana Pacers	19	63	.232	41.0	11‍–‍29	8‍–‍34	4‍–‍12	82

=== Conference ===
Eastern Conference
#	Team	W	L	PCT	GB	GP
1	c – Detroit Pistons *	60	22	.732	–	82
2	y – Boston Celtics *	56	26	.683	4.0	82
3	x – New York Knicks	53	29	.646	7.0	82
4	x – Cleveland Cavaliers	52	30	.634	8.0	82
5	x – Toronto Raptors	46	36	.561	14.0	82
6	y – Atlanta Hawks *	46	36	.561	14.0	82
7	x – Philadelphia 76ers	45	37	.549	15.0	82
8	x – Orlando Magic	45	37	.549	15.0	82
9	pi – Charlotte Hornets	44	38	.537	16.0	82
10	pi – Miami Heat	43	39	.524	17.0	82
11	Milwaukee Bucks	32	50	.390	28.0	82
12	Chicago Bulls	31	51	.378	29.0	82
13	Brooklyn Nets	20	62	.244	40.0	82
14	Indiana Pacers	19	63	.232	41.0	82
15	Washington Wizards	17	65	.207	43.0	82

== Game log ==
=== Preseason ===
2025 preseason game log
Total: 3–1 (Home: 1–1; Road: 2–0)
Preseason: 3–1 (home: 1–1; road: 2–0)

Game	Date	Team	Score	High points	High rebounds	High assists	Location Attendance	Record
1	October 6	@ Miami	W 103–93	Pete Nance (15)	Kyle Kuzma (8)	Kevin Porter Jr. (4)	Kaseya Center; 19,600	1–0
2	October 9	Detroit	W 117–111	A. J. Green (22)	Cole Anthony (7)	Cole Anthony (5)	Fiserv Forum; 11,364	2–0
3	October 12	@ Chicago	W 127–121	Kuzma, Turner (19)	Giannis Antetokounmpo (10)	Kevin Porter Jr. (8)	United Center; 20,976	3–0
4	October 14	Oklahoma City	L 112–116	Cole Anthony (21)	Bobby Portis (8)	Antetokounmpo, Kuzma, Porter Jr. (4)	Fiserv Forum; 12,489	3–1

2025–26 preseason schedule

=== Regular season ===
2025–26 game log
Total: 32–50 (Home: 19–22; Road: 13–28)
October: 4–1 (home: 3–0; road: 1–1)

Game	Date	Team	Score	High points	High rebounds	High assists	Location Attendance	Record
1	October 22	Washington	W 133–120	Giannis Antetokounmpo (37)	Giannis Antetokounmpo (14)	Tied (5)	Fiserv Forum; 17,341	1–0
2	October 24	@ Toronto	W 122–116	Giannis Antetokounmpo (31)	Giannis Antetokounmpo (20)	Antetokounmpo, Anthony (7)	Scotiabank Arena; 19,615	2–0
3	October 26	@ Cleveland	L 113–118	Giannis Antetokounmpo (40)	Giannis Antetokounmpo (14)	Giannis Antetokounmpo (9)	Rocket Arena; 19,432	2–1
4	October 28	New York	W 121–111	Giannis Antetokounmpo (37)	Antetokounmpo, Turner (8)	Cole Anthony (9)	Fiserv Forum; 16,309	3–1
5	October 30	Golden State	W 120–110	Ryan Rollins (32)	Kyle Kuzma (8)	Ryan Rollins (8)	Fiserv Forum; 17,341	4–1

November: 5–11 (home: 3–6; road: 2–5)

Game	Date	Team	Score	High points	High rebounds	High assists	Location Attendance	Record
6	November 1	Sacramento	L 133–135	Giannis Antetokounmpo (26)	Giannis Antetokounmpo (11)	Antetokounmpo, Rollins (8)	Fiserv Forum; 17,341	4–2
7	November 3	@ Indiana	W 117–115	Giannis Antetokounmpo (33)	Giannis Antetokounmpo (13)	Ryan Rollins (7)	Gainbridge Fieldhouse; 17,016	5–2
8	November 4	@ Toronto	L 100–128	Giannis Antetokounmpo (22)	Bobby Portis (9)	Ryan Rollins (5)	Scotiabank Arena; 18,357	5–3
9	November 7	Chicago	W 126–110	Giannis Antetokounmpo (41)	Giannis Antetokounmpo (15)	Giannis Antetokounmpo (9)	Fiserv Forum; 17,839	6–3
10	November 9	Houston	L 115–122	Giannis Antetokounmpo (37)	Giannis Antetokounmpo (8)	Cole Anthony (6)	Fiserv Forum; 17,341	6–4
11	November 10	@ Dallas	W 116–114	Giannis Antetokounmpo (30)	Giannis Antetokounmpo (8)	Ryan Rollins (8)	American Airlines Center; 19,132	7–4
12	November 12	@ Charlotte	L 100–111	Myles Turner (21)	Bobby Portis (8)	Ryan Rollins (6)	Spectrum Center; 17,142	7–5
13	November 14	Charlotte	W 147–134 (OT)	Kyle Kuzma (29)	Kyle Kuzma (10)	Giannis Antetokounmpo (18)	Fiserv Forum; 17,341	8–5
14	November 15	L.A. Lakers	L 95–119	Giannis Antetokounmpo (32)	Giannis Antetokounmpo (10)	Cole Anthony (7)	Fiserv Forum; 17,341	8–6
15	November 17	@ Cleveland	L 106–118	Ryan Rollins (24)	Myles Turner (7)	Cole Anthony (8)	Rocket Arena; 19,432	8–7
16	November 20	Philadelphia	L 114–123 (OT)	Ryan Rollins (32)	Myles Turner (10)	Ryan Rollins (14)	Fiserv Forum; 16,574	8–8
17	November 22	Detroit	L 116–129	Ryan Rollins (24)	Bobby Portis (7)	Ryan Rollins (7)	Fiserv Forum; 17,341	8–9
18	November 24	Portland	L 103–115	Bobby Portis (22)	Myles Turner (11)	Ryan Rollins (7)	Fiserv Forum; 16,526	8–10
19	November 26	@ Miami	L 103–106	Ryan Rollins (26)	Kyle Kuzma (12)	A. J. Green (8)	Kaseya Center; 19,600	8–11
20	November 28	@ New York	L 109–118	Giannis Antetokounmpo (30)	Giannis Antetokounmpo (15)	Giannis Antetokounmpo (8)	Madison Square Garden; 19,812	8–12
21	November 29	Brooklyn	W 116–99	Giannis Antetokounmpo (29)	Antetokounmpo, Sims (8)	Kevin Porter Jr. (6)	Fiserv Forum; 16,396	9–12

December: 5–8 (home: 2–3; road: 3–5)

Game	Date	Team	Score	High points	High rebounds	High assists	Location Attendance	Record
22	December 1	@ Washington	L 126–129	Kevin Porter Jr. (30)	Antetokounmpo, Sims (7)	Kyle Kuzma (6)	Capital One Arena; 13,709	9–13
23	December 3	Detroit	W 113–109	Kevin Porter Jr. (26)	Jericho Sims (14)	Porter Jr., Rollins (8)	Fiserv Forum; 16,256	10–13
24	December 5	Philadelphia	L 101–116	Bobby Portis (22)	Jericho Sims (9)	Kevin Porter Jr. (9)	Fiserv Forum; 17,341	10–14
25	December 6	@ Detroit	L 112–124	Kevin Porter Jr. (32)	Bobby Portis (7)	Porter Jr., Rollins (6)	Little Caesars Arena; 19,931	10–15
26	December 11	Boston	W 116–101	Kyle Kuzma (31)	Porter Jr., Portis (10)	Kevin Porter Jr. (13)	Fiserv Forum; 15,458	11–15
27	December 14	@ Brooklyn	L 82–127	Gary Trent Jr. (20)	Kuzma, Sims (7)	Kevin Porter Jr. (7)	Barclays Center; 16,439	11–16
28	December 18	Toronto	L 105–111	Bobby Portis (24)	Bobby Portis (12)	Kevin Porter Jr. (13)	Fiserv Forum; 17,341	11–17
29	December 21	@ Minnesota	L 100–103	Kevin Porter Jr. (24)	Bobby Portis (11)	Kevin Porter Jr. (9)	Target Center; 18,978	11–18
30	December 23	@ Indiana	W 111–94	Kevin Porter Jr. (24)	Bobby Portis (9)	Kevin Porter Jr. (5)	Gainbridge Fieldhouse; 16,509	12–18
31	December 26	@ Memphis	L 104–125	A. J. Green (20)	Bobby Portis (12)	Porter Jr., Rollins (5)	FedExForum; 16,617	12–19
32	December 27	@ Chicago	W 112–103	Giannis Antetokounmpo (29)	Bobby Portis (11)	Kevin Porter Jr. (9)	United Center; 20,934	13–19
33	December 29	@ Charlotte	W 123–113	Bobby Portis (25)	Myles Turner (6)	Kevin Porter Jr. (11)	Spectrum Center; 19,562	14–19
34	December 31	Washington	L 113–114	Giannis Antetokounmpo (33)	Giannis Antetokounmpo (15)	Ryan Rollins (7)	Fiserv Forum; 17,341	14–20

January: 4–8 (home: 1–3; road: 3–5)

Game	Date	Team	Score	High points	High rebounds	High assists	Location Attendance	Record
35	January 2	Charlotte	W 122–121	Giannis Antetokounmpo (30)	Giannis Antetokounmpo (10)	Kevin Porter Jr. (10)	Fiserv Forum; 17,673	15–20
36	January 4	@ Sacramento	W 115–98	Giannis Antetokounmpo (37)	Antetokounmpo, Portis (11)	Kevin Porter Jr. (10)	Golden 1 Center; 15,892	16–20
37	January 7	@ Golden State	L 113–120	Giannis Antetokounmpo (34)	Giannis Antetokounmpo (10)	Kevin Porter Jr. (9)	Chase Center; 18,064	16–21
38	January 9	@ L.A. Lakers	W 105–101	Kevin Porter Jr. (22)	Bobby Portis (12)	Kevin Porter Jr. (6)	Crypto.com Arena; 18,997	17–21
39	January 11	@ Denver	L 104–108	Giannis Antetokounmpo (31)	Kevin Porter Jr. (9)	Giannis Antetokounmpo (11)	Ball Arena; 19,645	17–22
40	January 13	Minnesota	L 106–139	Giannis Antetokounmpo (25)	Giannis Antetokounmpo (8)	Kevin Porter Jr. (8)	Fiserv Forum; 17,341	17–23
41	January 15	@ San Antonio	L 101–119	Giannis Antetokounmpo (21)	Ryan Rollins (7)	Ryan Rollins (7)	Frost Bank Center; 18,611	17–24
42	January 19	@ Atlanta	W 112–110	Giannis Antetokounmpo (21)	Giannis Antetokounmpo (17)	Kevin Porter Jr. (7)	State Farm Arena; 16,284	18–24
43	January 21	Oklahoma City	L 102–122	Giannis Antetokounmpo (19)	Giannis Antetokounmpo (14)	Bobby Portis (9)	Fiserv Forum; 16,594	18–25
44	January 23	Denver	L 100–102	Giannis Antetokounmpo (22)	Giannis Antetokounmpo (13)	Giannis Antetokounmpo (7)	Fiserv Forum; 17,341	18–26
—	January 25	Dallas	Postponed due to the January 2026 North American winter storm. Makeup date March 31.					
45	January 27	@ Philadelphia	L 122–139	Myles Turner (31)	Bobby Portis (12)	Kuzma, Portis (8)	Xfinity Mobile Arena; 16,917	18–27
46	January 29	@ Washington	L 99–109	Myles Turner (21)	Myles Turner (14)	Ryan Rollins (8)	Capital One Arena; 16,235	18–28

February: 8–4 (home: 5–2; road: 3–2)

Game	Date	Team	Score	High points	High rebounds	High assists	Location Attendance	Record
47	February 1	@ Boston	L 79–107	Ryan Rollins (25)	Bobby Portis (12)	Ryan Rollins (7)	TD Garden; 19,156	18–29
48	February 3	Chicago	W 131–115	Kyle Kuzma (31)	Kyle Kuzma (10)	Ryan Rollins (10)	Fiserv Forum; 17,341	19–29
49	February 4	New Orleans	W 141–137 (OT)	Ryan Rollins (27)	Myles Turner (9)	Kuzma, Porter Jr. (9)	Fiserv Forum; 14,343	20–29
50	February 6	Indiana	W 105–99	Kevin Porter Jr. (23)	Jericho Sims (15)	Kevin Porter Jr. (8)	Fiserv Forum; 17,341	21–29
51	February 9	@ Orlando	L 99–118	Kevin Porter Jr. (28)	Tied (6)	Kevin Porter Jr. (7)	Kia Center; 18,202	21–30
52	February 11	@ Orlando	W 116–108	Cam Thomas (34)	Jericho Sims (11)	Kevin Porter Jr. (11)	Kia Center; 18,298	22–30
53	February 12	@ Oklahoma City	W 110–93	Ousmane Dieng (19)	Bobby Portis (12)	Kevin Porter Jr. (7)	Paycom Center; 18,203	23–30
All-Star Game
54	February 20	@ New Orleans	W 139–118	Rollins, Thomas (27)	Bobby Portis (11)	Kevin Porter Jr. (7)	Smoothie King Center; 15,714	24–30
55	February 22	Toronto	L 94–122	Porter Jr., Rollins (21)	Ryan Rollins (9)	Kevin Porter Jr. (10)	Fiserv Forum; 17,341	24–31
56	February 24	Miami	W 128–117	Kevin Porter Jr. (32)	Jericho Sims (10)	Kevin Porter Jr. (7)	Fiserv Forum; 15,459	25–31
57	February 25	Cleveland	W 118–116	Kevin Porter Jr. (20)	Jericho Sims (11)	Ryan Rollins (9)	Fiserv Forum; 14,702	26–31
58	February 27	New York	L 98–127	Myles Turner (19)	Kevin Porter Jr. (6)	Kevin Porter Jr. (10)	Fiserv Forum; 17,341	26–32

March: 4–13 (home: 3–7; road: 1–6)

Game	Date	Team	Score	High points	High rebounds	High assists	Location Attendance	Record
59	March 1	@ Chicago	L 97–120	Bobby Portis (18)	Jericho Sims (11)	Ryan Rollins (7)	United Center; 20,749	26–33
60	March 2	Boston	L 81–108	Giannis Antetokounmpo (19)	Giannis Antetokounmpo (11)	Myles Turner (3)	Fiserv Forum; 15,992	26–34
61	March 4	Atlanta	L 113–131	Giannis Antetokounmpo (24)	Jericho Sims (11)	Ryan Rollins (12)	Fiserv Forum; 14,889	26–35
62	March 7	Utah	W 113–99	Giannis Antetokounmpo (27)	Ryan Rollins (11)	Ousmane Dieng (9)	Fiserv Forum; 16,020	27–35
63	March 8	Orlando	L 91–130	Bobby Portis (18)	Bobby Portis (10)	Cam Thomas (6)	Fiserv Forum; 15,555	27–36
64	March 10	Phoenix	L 114–129	Kyle Kuzma (33)	Ousmane Dieng (10)	Ryan Rollins (7)	Fiserv Forum; 15,300	27–37
65	March 12	@ Miami	L 105–112	Giannis Antetokounmpo (31)	Kevin Porter Jr. (7)	Ryan Rollins (10)	Kaseya Center; 19,700	27–38
66	March 14	@ Atlanta	L 99–122	Ryan Rollins (22)	Kevin Porter Jr. (7)	Ryan Rollins (8)	State Farm Arena; 16,013	27–39
67	March 15	Indiana	W 134–123	Giannis Antetokounmpo (31)	Giannis Antetokounmpo (14)	Antetokounmpo, Kuzma (8)	Fiserv Forum; 15,898	28–39
68	March 17	Cleveland	L 116–123	Kevin Porter Jr. (25)	Bobby Portis (9)	Kevin Porter Jr. (10)	Fiserv Forum; 16,341	28–40
69	March 19	@ Utah	L 96–128	Ryan Rollins (15)	Bobby Portis (6)	Ryan Rollins (5)	Delta Center; 18,186	28–41
70	March 21	@ Phoenix	W 108–105	Ryan Rollins (26)	Jericho Sims (11)	Ryan Rollins (7)	Mortgage Matchup Center; 17,071	29–41
71	March 23	@ L.A. Clippers	L 96–129	Gary Trent Jr. (20)	Tied (6)	Dieng, Rollins (7)	Intuit Dome; 16,515	29–42
72	March 25	@ Portland	L 99–130	Ryan Rollins (36)	Prince, Sims (6)	A. J. Green (5)	Moda Center; 16,991	29–43
73	March 28	San Antonio	L 95–127	Gary Trent Jr. (18)	Jericho Sims (10)	Ousmane Dieng (5)	Fiserv Forum; 17,341	29–44
74	March 29	L.A. Clippers	L 113–127	Gary Trent Jr. (36)	Taurean Prince (7)	Taurean Prince (8)	Fiserv Forum; 17,341	29–45
75	March 31	Dallas	W 123–99	Ryan Rollins (24)	Ousmane Dieng (10)	Ryan Rollins (9)	Fiserv Forum; 16,414	30–45

April: 2–5 (home: 2–1; road: 0–4)

Game	Date	Team	Score	High points	High rebounds	High assists	Location Attendance	Record
76	April 1	@ Houston	L 113–119	Ousmane Dieng (36)	Jericho Sims (20)	Ousmane Dieng (10)	Toyota Center; 18,055	30–46
77	April 3	Boston	L 101–130	Taurean Prince (18)	Pete Nance (10)	Jericho Sims (6)	Fiserv Forum; 17,341	30–47
78	April 5	Memphis	W 131–115	Ryan Rollins (24)	Myles Turner (11)	Dieng, Kuzma (6)	Fiserv Forum; 15,248	31–47
79	April 7	@ Brooklyn	L 90–96	A. J. Green (20)	Taurean Prince (11)	Nance, Sims (6)	Barclays Center; 16,834	31–48
80	April 8	@ Detroit	L 111–137	Ryan Rollins (23)	Jericho Sims (11)	Jericho Sims (10)	Little Caesars Arena; 19,997	31–49
81	April 10	Brooklyn	W 125–108	A. J. Green (35)	Prince, Sims (10)	Ousmane Dieng (12)	Fiserv Forum; 17,379	32–49
82	April 12	@ Philadelphia	L 106–126	Cormac Ryan (22)	Cormac Ryan (10)	Ousmane Dieng (8)	Xfinity Mobile Arena; 19,746	32–50

2025–26 season schedule

=== NBA Cup ===
==== East Group C ====
Pos	Team	Pld	W	L	PF	PA	PD	Qualification
1	New York Knicks	4	3	1	512	477	+35	Advanced to knockout rounds
2	Miami Heat	4	3	1	507	458	+49	Advanced to knockout rounds
3	Milwaukee Bucks	4	2	2	467	463	+4	
4	Charlotte Hornets	4	1	3	461	500	−39	
5	Chicago Bulls	4	1	3	468	517	−49	

Source: NBA

== Player statistics ==
Legend
GP	Games played	GS	Games started	MPG	Minutes per game
FG%	Field-goal percentage	3P%	3-point field-goal percentage	FT%	Free-throw percentage
RPG	Rebounds per game	APG	Assists per game	SPG	Steals per game
BPG	Blocks per game	PPG	Points per game

=== Regular season ===
Milwaukee Bucks statistics
Player	GP	GS	MPG	FG%	3P%	FT%	RPG	APG	SPG	BPG	PPG
Alex Antetokounmpo	6	0	3.5	.375	.286	.733	1.0	.2	.0	.2	3.2
Giannis Antetokounmpo	36	36	28.9	.624	.333	.650	9.8	5.4	.9	.7	27.6
Thanasis Antetokounmpo	34	0	4.4	.469	.000	.567	.9	.4	.4	.2	1.4
Cole Anthony	35	0	15.1	.424	.306	.615	2.5	3.5	.6	.3	6.7
Amir Coffey^{†}	30	2	8.8	.473	.280	.867	.9	.4	.1	.1	2.4
Ousmane Dieng^{†}	30	20	26.8	.423	.331	.667	4.6	3.6	.8	.3	11.0
A. J. Green	78	68	29.1	.424	.419	.855	2.7	1.9	.5	.1	10.4
Gary Harris	48	2	13.8	.442	.412	.889	1.3	1.1	.6	.2	2.7
Andre Jackson Jr.	48	1	8.5	.328	.250	.625	1.5	.9	.4	.1	2.4
Kyle Kuzma	69	43	26.2	.492	.347	.726	4.5	2.7	.7	.4	13.0
Pete Nance	47	6	15.7	.515	.420	.364	2.7	1.0	.3	.3	5.4
Kevin Porter Jr.	38	36	33.2	.465	.322	.878	5.2	7.4	2.2	.5	17.4
Bobby Portis	67	9	24.2	.488	.456	.706	6.4	1.6	.6	.2	13.7
Taurean Prince	26	7	23.5	.450	.436	1.000	3.1	1.8	.6	.2	9.2
Ryan Rollins	74	67	32.1	.472	.406	.796	4.6	5.6	1.5	.4	17.3
Cormac Ryan	11	2	24.6	.520	.458	.923	2.5	1.7	1.0	.3	14.3
Mark Sears	7	0	3.7	.462	.500	.750	.3	.3	.0	.0	3.1
Jericho Sims	67	19	19.7	.784		.620	5.5	1.6	.3	.3	5.0
Cam Thomas^{†}	18	0	16.6	.431	.275	.754	1.6	1.9	.3	.1	10.7
Gary Trent Jr.	65	21	21.2	.387	.360	.769	1.0	1.2	.5	.0	8.1
Myles Turner	71	71	26.9	.440	.383	.740	5.3	1.5	.7	1.6	11.9

- ^{†} Denotes player spent time with another team in the season. Stats reflect time with the Bucks only.

== Transactions ==
=== Overview ===
Players Added

Via free agency

- Alex Antetokounmpo
- Cole Anthony
- Amir Coffey
- Gary Harris
- Cormac Ryan
- Mark Sears
- Cam Thomas
- Myles Turner

Via trade

- Ousmane Dieng
Players Lost

Via trade

- Cole Anthony
- Amir Coffey
- Pat Connaughton

Via free agency

- Brook Lopez

Waived

- Jamaree Bouyea
- Damian Lillard
- Chris Livingston
- Mark Sears
- Tyler Smith

=== Trades ===
July 6, 2025	To Milwaukee Bucks Vasilije Micić	To Charlotte Hornets Pat Connaughton; 2031 MIL second-round pick 2032 MIL second-round pick

=== Free agency ===
==== Re-signed ====
Date	Player	Ref.
July 7	Kevin Porter Jr.	
July 7	Bobby Portis	
July 8	Gary Trent Jr.	

==== Additions ====
Date	Player	Former Team	Ref.
July 3	Mark Sears	Alabama Crimson Tide	
July 7	Myles Turner	Indiana Pacers	

==== Subtractions ====
Player	Reason	New Team	Ref.
Brook Lopez	Free agency	Los Angeles Clippers	
Chris Livingston	Waived	Cleveland Cavaliers	
Damian Lillard	Waived	Portland Trail Blazers	
Vasilije Micić	Waived	Hapoel Tel Aviv	
