= 2024–25 Milwaukee Bucks season =

2024–25 NBA season by team

- NBA Cup champions
- Head coach: Doc Rivers
- General manager: Jon Horst
- Owners: Wesley Edens; Jimmy Haslam
- Arena: Fiserv Forum

Results
- Record: 48–34 (.585)
- Place: Division: 3rd (Central); Conference: 5th (Eastern)
- Playoff finish: First round (lost to Pacers 1–4)
- Stats at Basketball Reference

Local media
- Television: FanDuel Sports Network Wisconsin; WMLW-TV (5 games); WYTU-LD (5 games in Spanish)
- Radio: WTMJ

The 2024–25 Milwaukee Bucks season was the 57th season for the franchise in the National Basketball Association (NBA). They looked to bounce back from the previous season's dysfunctional, disappointing ending following their injury-laden first round exit to the Indiana Pacers. It was the second and final season with Damian Lillard on the roster. The Bucks started out with a rather disappointing 2–8 start to their season before winning 8 of 9 games to reach a 10–9 record near the end of November, including a six-game winning streak near the end of that month.

The Bucks held a perfect record in the NBA Cup, winning the Cup on December 17 by defeating the Oklahoma City Thunder. With the Cleveland Cavaliers clinching the Central Division title, this was the first season since the 2017–18 season that the Bucks did not win the division title.

On February 6, long-time Buck Khris Middleton, who was with the franchise for over 10 seasons (including their title-winning season in 2021) was traded to the Washington Wizards in exchange for Kyle Kuzma, and Jericho Sims.

On April 5, the Bucks clinched their ninth-straight playoff berth following the Atlanta Hawks losing to the New York Knicks.

On April 29, the Bucks were eliminated in the first round by the eventual Eastern Conference champion Indiana Pacers for the second consecutive year, losing the series in five games. Lillard suffered a season-ending Achilles injury in game 4 of the series, which ultimately led to him being waived during the off-season.

The Milwaukee Bucks drew an average home attendance of 17,429, the 20th-highest of all NBA teams.

== Draft ==
Round	Pick	Player	Position(s)	Nationality	Club
1	23	AJ Johnson	SG	United States	Illawarra Hawks Australia
2	33	Tyler Smith	SF	United States	NBA G League Ignite

The Bucks entered this draft (which was two days instead of one like it had been since the NBA draft was shortened down to two rounds back in 1989) with a late first-round pick and an early second-round pick they had acquired from the Portland Trail Blazers via the Sacramento Kings. Near the end of the first night of the draft, the Bucks would surprise draft pundits by selecting shooting guard AJ Johnson (a player who was projected to either be taken late in the second round or go undrafted by most draft boards) from the Illawarra Hawks of Australia's National Basketball League as the 23rd pick of the draft. On the second day of the draft, the Bucks would select what ultimately became the final player drafted from the now-defunct NBA G League Ignite team of the NBA G League (and their third player drafted in four seasons from that team) by selecting the former Overtime Elite forward Tyler Smith with the 33rd pick of the draft.

== Roster ==
2024–25 Milwaukee Bucks roster
Players

Pos.	No.	Player	Height	Weight	DOB	From
F	34	Giannis Antetokounmpo	6 ft 11 in (2.11 m)	243 lb (110 kg)	1994-12-06	Greece
G	15	Jamaree Bouyea (TW)	6 ft 2 in (1.88 m)	180 lb (82 kg)	1999-06-27	San Francisco
G	24	Pat Connaughton	6 ft 5 in (1.96 m)	209 lb (95 kg)	1993-01-06	Notre Dame
G	20	A. J. Green	6 ft 4 in (1.93 m)	190 lb (86 kg)	1999-09-27	Northern Iowa
G	44	Andre Jackson Jr.	6 ft 6 in (1.98 m)	209 lb (95 kg)	2001-11-13	Connecticut
F	18	Kyle Kuzma	6 ft 9 in (2.06 m)	221 lb (100 kg)	1995-07-24	Utah
G	0	Damian Lillard (injured)	6 ft 2 in (1.88 m)	195 lb (88 kg)	1990-07-15	Weber State
F	7	Chris Livingston	6 ft 6 in (1.98 m)	220 lb (100 kg)	2003-10-15	Kentucky
C	11	Brook Lopez	7 ft 1 in (2.16 m)	282 lb (128 kg)	1988-04-01	Stanford
F	35	Pete Nance (TW)	6 ft 10 in (2.08 m)	225 lb (102 kg)	2000-02-19	North Carolina
G	3	Kevin Porter Jr.	6 ft 4 in (1.93 m)	203 lb (92 kg)	2000-05-04	USC
F/C	9	Bobby Portis (S)	6 ft 10 in (2.08 m)	250 lb (113 kg)	1995-02-10	Arkansas
F	12	Taurean Prince	6 ft 6 in (1.98 m)	218 lb (99 kg)	1994-03-22	Baylor
G	13	Ryan Rollins	6 ft 3 in (1.91 m)	180 lb (82 kg)	2002-07-03	Toledo
C	00	Jericho Sims	6 ft 10 in (2.08 m)	250 lb (113 kg)	1998-10-20	Texas
F	21	Tyler Smith	6 ft 9 in (2.06 m)	224 lb (102 kg)	2004-11-02	George Bush HS (TX)
G	5	Gary Trent Jr.	6 ft 5 in (1.96 m)	204 lb (93 kg)	1999-01-18	Duke
G	17	Stanley Umude (TW)	6 ft 6 in (1.98 m)	210 lb (95 kg)	1999-04-12	Arkansas

Coaches
Head coach
- Doc Rivers
Assistant(s)
- Vin Baker
- Greg Buckner
- Pete Dominguez
- Darvin Ham
- Jack Herum
- Dave Joerger
- Rex Kalamian
- Jason Love
- Joe Prunty
- Spencer Rivers

Legend
- (DP) Unsigned draft pick
- (FA) Free agent
- (S) Suspended
- (GL) On assignment to G League affiliate
- (TW) Two-way affiliate player
- Injured

Roster
Updated: February 6, 2025

=== Depth chart ===
Pos.	Starting 5	Bench 1	Bench 2
C	Brook Lopez	Bobby Portis	Jericho Sims
PF	Giannis Antetokounmpo	Tyler Smith	Chris Livingston
SF	Taurean Prince	Gary Trent Jr.	MarJon Beauchamp
SG	Khris Middleton	Pat Connaughton	A. J. Green/Andre Jackson Jr.
PG	Damian Lillard	Kevin Porter Jr.	AJ Johnson

== Standings ==
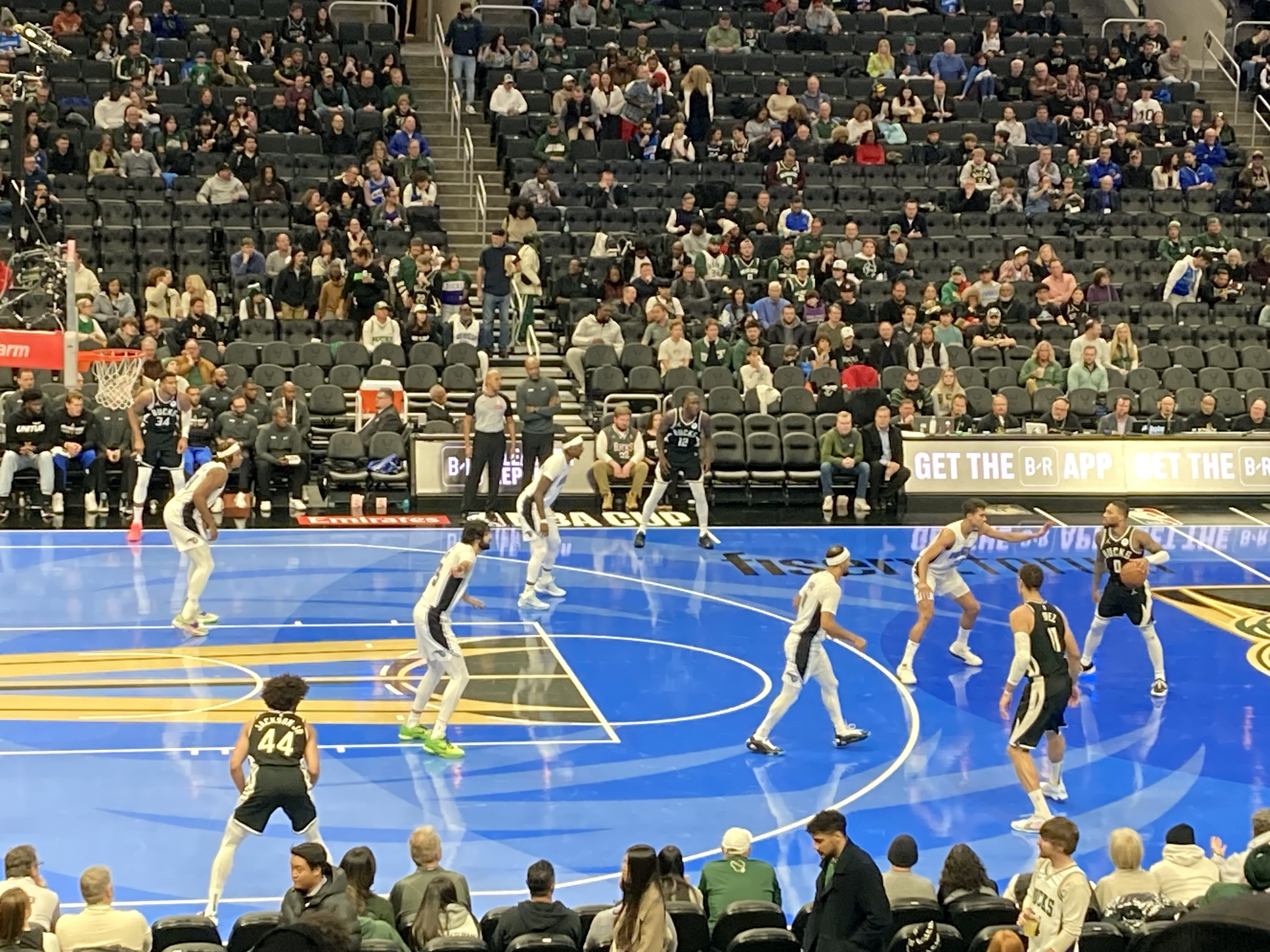
The Bucks playing against Orlando

=== Division ===
Central Division	W	L	PCT	GB	Home	Road	Div	GP
c – Cleveland Cavaliers	64	18	.780	–	34‍–‍7	30‍–‍11	12‍–‍4	82
x – Indiana Pacers	50	32	.610	14.0	29‍–‍12	21‍–‍20	10‍–‍6	82
x – Milwaukee Bucks	48	34	.585	16.0	28‍–‍14	20‍–‍20	9‍–‍7	82
x – Detroit Pistons	44	38	.537	20.0	22‍–‍19	22‍–‍19	5‍–‍11	82
pi – Chicago Bulls	39	43	.476	25.0	18‍–‍23	21‍–‍20	4‍–‍12	82

=== Conference ===
Eastern Conference
#	Team	W	L	PCT	GB	GP
1	c – Cleveland Cavaliers *	64	18	.780	–	82
2	y – Boston Celtics *	61	21	.744	3.0	82
3	x – New York Knicks	51	31	.622	13.0	82
4	x – Indiana Pacers	50	32	.610	14.0	82
5	x – Milwaukee Bucks	48	34	.585	16.0	82
6	x – Detroit Pistons	44	38	.537	20.0	82
7	y – Orlando Magic *	41	41	.500	23.0	82
8	pi – Atlanta Hawks	40	42	.488	24.0	82
9	pi – Chicago Bulls	39	43	.476	25.0	82
10	x – Miami Heat	37	45	.451	27.0	82
11	Toronto Raptors	30	52	.366	34.0	82
12	Brooklyn Nets	26	56	.317	38.0	82
13	Philadelphia 76ers	24	58	.293	40.0	82
14	Charlotte Hornets	19	63	.232	45.0	82
15	Washington Wizards	18	64	.220	46.0	82

== Game log ==
=== Preseason ===
During the preseason, the Bucks would play their final games under what was previously named the Bally Sports Wisconsin moniker. Bally Sports would rebrand itself as the FanDuel Sports Network as of October 21, 2024 before the start of the regular season.

2024 preseason game log
Total: 1–3 (Home: 1–1; Road: 0–2)
Preseason: 1–3 (home: 1–1; road: 0–2)

Game	Date	Team	Score	High points	High rebounds	High assists	Location Attendance	Record
1	October 6	@ Detroit	L 87–120	Bobby Portis (16)	Andre Jackson Jr. (7)	Damian Lillard (4)	Little Caesars Arena; 9,811	0–1
2	October 10	L.A. Lakers	L 102–107	Bobby Portis (23)	Tyler Smith (9)	Beauchamp, Lillard, Trent Jr. (4)	Fiserv Forum; 15,526	0–2
3	October 14	Chicago	W 111–107	Giannis Antetokounmpo (24)	Giannis Antetokounmpo (10)	Damian Lillard (9)	Fiserv Forum; 12,725	1–2
4	October 17	@ Dallas	L 84–109	Gary Trent Jr. (12)	Tyler Smith (10)	AJ Johnson (8)	American Airlines Center; 19,217	1–3

2024–25 preseason schedule

=== Regular season ===
2024–25 game log
Total: 48–34 (Home: 28–14; Road: 20–20)
October: 1–4 (home: 0–1; road: 1–3)

Game	Date	Team	Score	High points	High rebounds	High assists	Location Attendance	Record
1	October 23	@ Philadelphia	W 124–109	Damian Lillard (30)	Giannis Antetokounmpo (14)	Giannis Antetokounmpo (7)	Wells Fargo Center; 19,754	1–0
2	October 25	Chicago	L 122–133	Giannis Antetokounmpo (38)	Bobby Portis (12)	Damian Lillard (8)	Fiserv Forum; 17,790	1–1
3	October 27	@ Brooklyn	L 102–115	Giannis Antetokounmpo (22)	Giannis Antetokounmpo (12)	Giannis Antetokounmpo (7)	Barclays Center; 17,926	1–2
4	October 28	@ Boston	L 108–119	Damian Lillard (33)	Giannis Antetokounmpo (10)	Damian Lillard (7)	TD Garden; 19,156	1–3
5	October 31	@ Memphis	L 99–122	Giannis Antetokounmpo (37)	Giannis Antetokounmpo (11)	Damian Lillard (6)	FedExForum; 15,377	1–4

November: 9–5 (home: 8–2; road: 1–3)

Game	Date	Team	Score	High points	High rebounds	High assists	Location Attendance	Record
6	November 2	Cleveland	L 113–114	Damian Lillard (41)	Giannis Antetokounmpo (16)	Antetokounmpo, Lillard (9)	Fiserv Forum; 17,341	1–5
7	November 4	@ Cleveland	L 114–116	Damian Lillard (36)	Bobby Portis (18)	Damian Lillard (7)	Rocket Mortgage FieldHouse; 19,432	1–6
8	November 7	Utah	W 123–100	Damian Lillard (34)	Giannis Antetokounmpo (16)	Damian Lillard (7)	Fiserv Forum; 17,341	2–6
9	November 8	@ New York	L 94–116	Giannis Antetokounmpo (24)	Giannis Antetokounmpo (12)	Damian Lillard (6)	Madison Square Garden; 19,812	2–7
10	November 10	Boston	L 107–113	Giannis Antetokounmpo (43)	Giannis Antetokounmpo (13)	Damian Lillard (6)	Fiserv Forum; 17,341	2–8
11	November 12	Toronto	W 99–85	Giannis Antetokounmpo (23)	Bobby Portis (8)	Giannis Antetokounmpo (7)	Fiserv Forum; 17,341	3–8
12	November 13	Detroit	W 127–120 (OT)	Giannis Antetokounmpo (59)	Giannis Antetokounmpo (14)	Delon Wright (8)	Fiserv Forum; 17,341	4–8
13	November 16	@ Charlotte	L 114–115	Taurean Prince (23)	Giannis Antetokounmpo (15)	Giannis Antetokounmpo (12)	Spectrum Center; 19,145	4–9
14	November 18	Houston	W 101–100	Brook Lopez (27)	Giannis Antetokounmpo (13)	Damian Lillard (10)	Fiserv Forum; 17,341	5–9
15	November 20	Chicago	W 122–106	Giannis Antetokounmpo (41)	Giannis Antetokounmpo (9)	Damian Lillard (10)	Fiserv Forum; 17,341	6–9
16	November 22	Indiana	W 129–117	Giannis Antetokounmpo (37)	Giannis Antetokounmpo (10)	Damian Lillard (13)	Fiserv Forum; 17,341	7–9
17	November 23	Charlotte	W 125–119	Giannis Antetokounmpo (32)	Giannis Antetokounmpo (11)	Giannis Antetokounmpo (6)	Fiserv Forum; 17,341	8–9
18	November 26	@ Miami	W 106–103	Damian Lillard (37)	Andre Jackson Jr. (9)	Damian Lillard (12)	Kaseya Center; 19,622	9–9
19	November 30	Washington	W 124–114	Giannis Antetokounmpo (42)	Giannis Antetokounmpo (12)	Giannis Antetokounmpo (11)	Fiserv Forum; 17,341	10–9

December: 7–5 (home: 3–2; road: 4–3)

Game	Date	Team	Score	High points	High rebounds	High assists	Location Attendance	Record
20	December 3	@ Detroit	W 128–107	Giannis Antetokounmpo (28)	Giannis Antetokounmpo (7)	Giannis Antetokounmpo (8)	Little Caesars Arena; 17,988	11–9
21	December 4	Atlanta	L 104–119	Giannis Antetokounmpo (31)	Giannis Antetokounmpo (11)	Antetokounmpo, Lillard (5)	Fiserv Forum; 17,341	11–10
22	December 6	@ Boston	L 105–111	Damian Lillard (31)	Bobby Portis (18)	Khris Middleton (5)	TD Garden; 19,156	11–11
23	December 8	@ Brooklyn	W 118–113	Giannis Antetokounmpo (34)	Giannis Antetokounmpo (11)	Damian Lillard (11)	Barclays Center; 17,926	12–11
24	December 10	Orlando	W 114–109	Giannis Antetokounmpo (37)	Bobby Portis (10)	Damian Lillard (9)	Fiserv Forum; 17,341	13–11
25	December 14	Atlanta	W 110–102	Giannis Antetokounmpo (32)	Giannis Antetokounmpo (14)	Giannis Antetokounmpo (9)	T-Mobile Arena (Las Vegas); 17,113	14–11
Cup	December 17	@ Oklahoma City	W 97–81	Giannis Antetokounmpo (26)	Giannis Antetokounmpo (19)	Giannis Antetokounmpo (10)	T-Mobile Arena (Las Vegas); 18,519	
26	December 20	@ Cleveland	L 101–124	Giannis Antetokounmpo (33)	Giannis Antetokounmpo (14)	A. J. Green (4)	Rocket Mortgage FieldHouse; 19,432	14–12
27	December 21	Washington	W 112–101	Bobby Portis (34)	Bobby Portis (10)	Middleton, Portis (8)	Fiserv Forum; 17,341	15–12
28	December 23	@ Chicago	W 112–91	Lopez, Middleton (21)	Bobby Portis (13)	Bobby Portis (6)	United Center; 21,234	16–12
29	December 26	Brooklyn	L 105–111	Khris Middleton (21)	Bobby Portis (8)	Middleton, Wright (5)	Fiserv Forum; 17,957	16–13
30	December 28	@ Chicago	L 111–116	Damian Lillard (29)	Bobby Portis (9)	Damian Lillard (12)	United Center; 21,511	16–14
31	December 31	@ Indiana	W 120–112	Giannis Antetokounmpo (30)	Bobby Portis (15)	Khris Middleton (7)	Gainbridge Fieldhouse; 17,274	17–14

January: 9–6 (home: 6–2; road: 3–4)

Game	Date	Team	Score	High points	High rebounds	High assists	Location Attendance	Record
32	January 2	Brooklyn	L 110–113	Giannis Antetokounmpo (27)	Giannis Antetokounmpo (13)	Antetokounmpo, Lillard (7)	Fiserv Forum; 17,341	17–15
33	January 4	Portland	L 102–105	Giannis Antetokounmpo (31)	Giannis Antetokounmpo (11)	Damian Lillard (6)	Fiserv Forum; 17,595	17–16
34	January 6	@ Toronto	W 128–104	Damian Lillard (25)	Giannis Antetokounmpo (12)	Giannis Antetokounmpo (13)	Scotiabank Arena; 17,829	18–16
35	January 8	San Antonio	W 121–105	Damian Lillard (26)	Giannis Antetokounmpo (16)	Antetokounmpo, Lillard (8)	Fiserv Forum; 17,341	19–16
36	January 10	@ Orlando	W 109–106	Giannis Antetokounmpo (41)	Giannis Antetokounmpo (14)	Damian Lillard (7)	Kia Center; 18,846	20–16
37	January 12	@ New York	L 106–140	Giannis Antetokounmpo (24)	Giannis Antetokounmpo (13)	Lillard, Middleton (5)	Madison Square Garden; 19,812	20–17
38	January 14	Sacramento	W 130–115	Giannis Antetokounmpo (33)	Giannis Antetokounmpo (11)	Giannis Antetokounmpo (13)	Fiserv Forum; 17,341	21–17
39	January 15	Orlando	W 122–93	Damian Lillard (30)	Giannis Antetokounmpo (11)	Khris Middleton (6)	Fiserv Forum; 17,341	22–17
40	January 17	Toronto	W 130–112	Giannis Antetokounmpo (35)	Giannis Antetokounmpo (13)	Damian Lillard (8)	Fiserv Forum; 17,341	23–17
41	January 19	Philadelphia	W 123–109	Giannis Antetokounmpo (34)	Giannis Antetokounmpo (15)	Khris Middleton (8)	Fiserv Forum; 17,345	24–17
–	January 22	@ New Orleans	Postponed due to the Gulf Coast blizzard. Makeup date April 6.					
42	January 23	Miami	W 125–96	Damian Lillard (29)	Giannis Antetokounmpo (12)	Damian Lillard (11)	Fiserv Forum; 17,341	25–17
43	January 25	@ L.A. Clippers	L 117–127	Giannis Antetokounmpo (36)	Giannis Antetokounmpo (13)	Damian Lillard (10)	Intuit Dome; 17,927	25–18
44	January 27	@ Utah	W 125–110	Antetokounmpo, Lillard (35)	Giannis Antetokounmpo (18)	Lillard, Prince (8)	Delta Center; 18,175	26–18
45	January 28	@ Portland	L 112–125	Giannis Antetokounmpo (39)	Giannis Antetokounmpo (12)	Damian Lillard (6)	Moda Center; 17,030	26–19
46	January 31	@ San Antonio	L 118–144	Giannis Antetokounmpo (35)	Giannis Antetokounmpo (14)	Damian Lillard (7)	Frost Bank Center; 17,804	26–20

February: 7–5 (home: 4–2; road: 3–3)

Game	Date	Team	Score	High points	High rebounds	High assists	Location Attendance	Record
47	February 2	Memphis	L 119–132	Giannis Antetokounmpo (30)	Giannis Antetokounmpo (11)	Damian Lillard (9)	Fiserv Forum; 17,341	26–21
48	February 3	@ Oklahoma City	L 96–125	Ryan Rollins (16)	Tyler Smith (7)	Beauchamp, Johnson (4)	Paycom Center; 17,677	26–22
49	February 5	@ Charlotte	W 112–102	Damian Lillard (29)	Bobby Portis (17)	Damian Lillard (12)	Spectrum Center; 14,385	27–22
50	February 7	@ Atlanta	L 110–115	Bobby Portis (26)	Bobby Portis (15)	Damian Lillard (10)	State Farm Arena; 16,378	27–23
51	February 9	Philadelphia	W 135–127	Damian Lillard (43)	Bobby Portis (13)	Damian Lillard (8)	Fiserv Forum; 17,341	28–23
52	February 10	Golden State	L 111–125	Damian Lillard (38)	Taurean Prince (8)	Damian Lillard (7)	Fiserv Forum; 17,341	28–24
53	February 12	@ Minnesota	W 103–101	Gary Trent Jr. (21)	Kyle Kuzma (13)	Kevin Porter Jr. (5)	Target Center; 18,978	29–24
All-Star Game
54	February 20	L.A. Clippers	W 116–110	Giannis Antetokounmpo (23)	Giannis Antetokounmpo (8)	Damian Lillard (7)	Fiserv Forum; 17,341	30–24
55	February 21	@ Washington	W 104–101	Kyle Kuzma (19)	Brook Lopez (9)	Kyle Kuzma (5)	Capital One Arena; 18,865	31–24
56	February 23	Miami	W 120–113	Damian Lillard (28)	Giannis Antetokounmpo (16)	Damian Lillard (8)	Fiserv Forum; 17,442	32–24
57	February 25	@ Houston	L 97–100	Giannis Antetokounmpo (27)	Giannis Antetokounmpo (10)	Giannis Antetokounmpo (6)	Toyota Center; 18,055	32–25
58	February 27	Denver	W 121–112	Giannis Antetokounmpo (28)	Giannis Antetokounmpo (19)	Giannis Antetokounmpo (7)	Fiserv Forum; 17,566	33–25

March: 7–9 (home: 3–5; road: 4–4)

Game	Date	Team	Score	High points	High rebounds	High assists	Location Attendance	Record
59	March 1	@ Dallas	W 132–117	Giannis Antetokounmpo (29)	Giannis Antetokounmpo (9)	Giannis Antetokounmpo (9)	American Airlines Center; 20,272	34–25
60	March 4	@ Atlanta	W 127–121	Giannis Antetokounmpo (26)	Brook Lopez (13)	Giannis Antetokounmpo (10)	State Farm Arena; 16,008	35–25
61	March 5	Dallas	W 137–107	Damian Lillard (34)	Giannis Antetokounmpo (15)	Kevin Porter Jr. (14)	Fiserv Forum; 17,341	36–25
62	March 8	Orlando	L 109–111	Giannis Antetokounmpo (37)	Giannis Antetokounmpo (11)	Antetokounmpo, Green, Lillard (4)	Fiserv Forum; 17,815	36–26
63	March 9	Cleveland	L 100–112	Giannis Antetokounmpo (30)	Jericho Sims (10)	Damian Lillard (4)	Fiserv Forum; 17,355	36–27
64	March 11	@ Indiana	L 114–115	Brook Lopez (23)	Giannis Antetokounmpo (17)	Damian Lillard (11)	Gainbridge Fieldhouse; 15,008	36–28
65	March 13	L.A. Lakers	W 126–106	Giannis Antetokounmpo (24)	Giannis Antetokounmpo (12)	Damian Lillard (10)	Fiserv Forum; 18,017	37–28
66	March 15	Indiana	W 126–119	Giannis Antetokounmpo (34)	Antetokounmpo, Lillard (10)	Damian Lillard (8)	Fiserv Forum; 17,729	38–28
67	March 16	Oklahoma City	L 105–121	Giannis Antetokounmpo (21)	Giannis Antetokounmpo (12)	Giannis Antetokounmpo (10)	Fiserv Forum; 17,341	38–29
68	March 18	@ Golden State	L 93–104	Kyle Kuzma (22)	Giannis Antetokounmpo (9)	Giannis Antetokounmpo (7)	Chase Center; 18,064	38–30
69	March 20	@ L.A. Lakers	W 118–89	Giannis Antetokounmpo (28)	Antetokounmpo, Lopez (7)	Kyle Kuzma (5)	Crypto.com Arena; 17,709	39–30
70	March 22	@ Sacramento	W 114–108	Giannis Antetokounmpo (32)	Giannis Antetokounmpo (17)	Kevin Porter Jr. (6)	Golden 1 Center; 16,911	40–30
71	March 24	@ Phoenix	L 106–108	Giannis Antetokounmpo (31)	Antetokounmpo, Lopez (10)	Giannis Antetokounmpo (5)	PHX Arena; 17,071	40–31
72	March 26	@ Denver	L 117–127	Brook Lopez (26)	Pat Connaughton (8)	Kevin Porter Jr. (8)	Ball Arena; 19,641	40–32
73	March 28	New York	L 107–116	Giannis Antetokounmpo (30)	Giannis Antetokounmpo (9)	Giannis Antetokounmpo (7)	Fiserv Forum; 17,605	40–33
74	March 30	Atlanta	L 124–145	Giannis Antetokounmpo (31)	Giannis Antetokounmpo (9)	Antetokounmpo, Porter Jr., Rollins (5)	Fiserv Forum; 17,341	40–34

April: 8–0 (home: 4–0; road: 4–0)

Game	Date	Team	Score	High points	High rebounds	High assists	Location Attendance	Record
75	April 1	Phoenix	W 133–123	Giannis Antetokounmpo (37)	Brook Lopez (6)	Giannis Antetokounmpo (11)	Fiserv Forum; 17,341	41–34
76	April 3	@ Philadelphia	W 126–113	Giannis Antetokounmpo (35)	Giannis Antetokounmpo (17)	Giannis Antetokounmpo (20)	Wells Fargo Center; 19,763	42–34
77	April 5	@ Miami	W 121–115 (OT)	Giannis Antetokounmpo (36)	Giannis Antetokounmpo (15)	Giannis Antetokounmpo (10)	Kaseya Center; 19,734	43–34
78	April 6	@ New Orleans	W 111–107	Gary Trent Jr. (29)	Brook Lopez (12)	Ryan Rollins (10)	Smoothie King Center; 17,561	44–34
79	April 8	Minnesota	W 110–103	Giannis Antetokounmpo (23)	Giannis Antetokounmpo (13)	Giannis Antetokounmpo (10)	Fiserv Forum; 17,341	45–34
80	April 10	New Orleans	W 136–111	Giannis Antetokounmpo (28)	Giannis Antetokounmpo (11)	Kevin Porter Jr. (7)	Fiserv Forum; 17,341	46–34
81	April 11	@ Detroit	W 125–119	Giannis Antetokounmpo (32)	Giannis Antetokounmpo (11)	Giannis Antetokounmpo (15)	Little Caesars Arena; 20,062	47–34
82	April 13	Detroit	W 140–133 (OT)	Pat Connaughton (43)	Pat Connaughton (11)	Jamaree Bouyea (7)	Fiserv Forum; 17,796	48–34

2024–25 season schedule

=== Playoffs ===
2025 playoff game log
Total: 1–4 (home: 1–1; road: 0–3)
First Round: 1–4 (home: 1–1; road: 0–3)

Game	Date	Team	Score	High points	High rebounds	High assists	Location Attendance	Series
1	April 19	@ Indiana	L 98–117	Giannis Antetokounmpo (36)	Giannis Antetokounmpo (12)	Kevin Porter Jr. (5)	Gainbridge Fieldhouse; 17,274	0–1
2	April 22	@ Indiana	L 115–123	Giannis Antetokounmpo (34)	Giannis Antetokounmpo (18)	Antetokounmpo, Lillard (7)	Gainbridge Fieldhouse; 17,274	0–2
3	April 25	Indiana	W 117–101	Antetokounmpo, Trent Jr. (37)	Giannis Antetokounmpo (12)	Antetokounmpo, Porter Jr. (6)	Fiserv Forum; 17,942	1–2
4	April 27	Indiana	L 103–129	Giannis Antetokounmpo (28)	Giannis Antetokounmpo (15)	Antetokounmpo, Porter Jr. (6)	Fiserv Forum; 17,855	1–3
5	April 29	@ Indiana	L 118–119 (OT)	Gary Trent Jr. (33)	Giannis Antetokounmpo (20)	Giannis Antetokounmpo (13)	Gainbridge Fieldhouse; 17,274	1–4

2025 playoff schedule

=== NBA Cup ===
The groups were revealed during the tournament announcement on July 12, 2024.

==== East Group B ====
Pos	Team	Pld	W	L	PF	PA	PD	Qualification
1	Milwaukee Bucks	4	4	0	462	412	+50	Advance to knockout stage
2	Detroit Pistons	4	3	1	447	440	+7	
3	Miami Heat	4	2	2	459	439	+20	
4	Toronto Raptors	4	1	3	413	430	−17	
5	Indiana Pacers	4	0	4	445	505	−60	

Source: NBA
Rules for classification: Tiebreakers

== Player statistics ==
Legend
GP	Games played	GS	Games started	MPG	Minutes per game
FG%	Field-goal percentage	3P%	3-point field-goal percentage	FT%	Free-throw percentage
RPG	Rebounds per game	APG	Assists per game	SPG	Steals per game
BPG	Blocks per game	PPG	Points per game

=== Regular season ===
Milwaukee Bucks statistics
Player	GP	GS	MPG	FG%	3P%	FT%	RPG	APG	SPG	BPG	PPG
Giannis Antetokounmpo	67	67	34.2	.601	.222	.617	11.9	6.5	.9	1.2	30.4
MarJon Beauchamp^{†}	26	0	4.7	.383	.333	.750	1.2	.3	.1	.0	2.0
Jamaree Bouyea	5	1	12.3	.500	.200	.667	1.0	2.0	.8	.4	3.4
Pat Connaughton	41	1	14.7	.469	.321	.774	2.7	1.7	.2	.3	5.3
A. J. Green	73	7	22.7	.429	.427	.815	2.4	1.5	.5	.1	7.4
Andre Jackson Jr.	67	43	14.6	.477	.395	.500	2.7	1.2	.5	.2	3.4
AJ Johnson^{†}	7	0	6.3	.421	.600	.500	1.0	1.0	.1	.0	2.9
Kyle Kuzma^{†}	33	32	31.8	.455	.333	.663	5.6	2.2	.5	.4	14.5
Damian Lillard	58	58	36.1	.448	.376	.921	4.7	7.1	1.2	.2	24.9
Chris Livingston	21	1	5.0	.333	.000	.750	1.7	.2	.2	.0	1.4
Brook Lopez	80	80	31.8	.509	.373	.826	5.0	1.8	.6	1.9	13.0
Khris Middleton^{†}	23	7	23.2	.512	.407	.848	3.7	4.4	.7	.2	12.6
Pete Nance^{†}	6	1	11.6	.529	.417		1.8	1.2	.2	.3	3.8
Kevin Porter Jr.^{†}	30	2	19.9	.494	.408	.871	3.9	3.7	1.3	.1	11.7
Bobby Portis	49	7	25.4	.508	.407	.790	8.4	2.1	.7	.5	13.9
Taurean Prince	80	73	27.1	.457	.439	.813	3.6	1.9	1.0	.2	8.2
Liam Robbins	13	0	4.4	.250	.000	.500	.9	.2	.2	.2	.7
Ryan Rollins	56	19	14.6	.487	.408	.800	1.9	1.9	.8	.3	6.2
Jericho Sims^{†}	14	0	15.0	.680			4.9	.8	.1	.6	2.4
Tyler Smith	23	0	5.3	.480	.433	.750	1.1	.2	.1	.2	2.9
Gary Trent Jr.	74	9	25.6	.431	.416	.848	2.3	1.2	1.0	.1	11.1
Stanley Umude	22	0	3.9	.192	.200	.500	.8	.2	.1	.3	.7
Delon Wright^{†}	26	2	15.6	.268	.245	.563	1.8	1.8	.9	.3	2.5

=== Playoffs ===
Milwaukee Bucks statistics
Player	GP	GS	MPG	FG%	3P%	FT%	RPG	APG	SPG	BPG	PPG
Giannis Antetokounmpo	5	5	37.6	.606	.200	.698	15.4	6.6	1.0	1.0	33.0
Pat Connaughton	3	0	4.6	.250	.250	.500	.7	.3	.0	.0	2.0
A. J. Green	5	1	27.0	.462	.514	.500	2.8	2.0	.0	.2	11.0
Andre Jackson Jr.	2	0	2.5	.000	.000		.0	.0	.0	.0	.0
Kyle Kuzma	5	4	20.4	.343	.200	.500	2.2	.8	.0	.2	5.8
Damian Lillard	3	3	25.0	.222	.188	.857	2.7	4.7	.7	.7	7.0
Chris Livingston	2	0	2.4	.000	.000		.5	.0	.0	.0	.0
Brook Lopez	5	4	14.8	.364	.267	1.000	1.6	.8	.2	1.0	5.0
Kevin Porter Jr.	5	1	30.2	.396	.467	.846	3.6	5.4	.8	.0	11.2
Bobby Portis	5	1	31.7	.441	.357	.000	8.2	1.4	.4	.4	14.0
Taurean Prince	5	2	12.2	.200	.222		1.0	1.6	.4	.2	1.2
Ryan Rollins	3	1	9.9	.308	.286		.7	1.3	.3	.0	3.3
Jericho Sims	5	0	11.5	1.000		.667	4.0	.2	.0	.2	2.8
Gary Trent Jr.	5	3	34.2	.516	.500	.800	2.2	1.2	2.6	.0	18.8

- ^{†} Denotes player spent time with another team in the season. Stats reflect time with the Bucks only.

== Transactions ==
=== Free agency ===
==== Additions ====
Date	Player	Contract terms	Former team	Ref.
July 7	Delon Wright	1-year minimum	Miami Heat	
July 9	Taurean Prince	1 year minimum	Los Angeles Lakers	
July 9	Stanley Umude	Two-way contract	Detroit Pistons	
July 20	Gary Trent Jr.	1 year minimum	Toronto Raptors	

==== Subtractions ====
Date	Player	Reason left	New team	Ref.
July 11	Malik Beasley	Free agency	Detroit Pistons	
July 16	Patrick Beverley	Free agency	(Israel) Hapoel Tel Aviv	
