= Barcode (disambiguation) =

A barcode is a method of optical machine-readable representation of data.

Barcode may also refer to:

- Barcode (album), by Ben Wendel, 2026
- Barcode (drink), an American brand of sports drinks
- Barcode Project, a building complex in Southern Oslo, Norway
