= Kyle Kuzma =

American basketball player (born 1995)

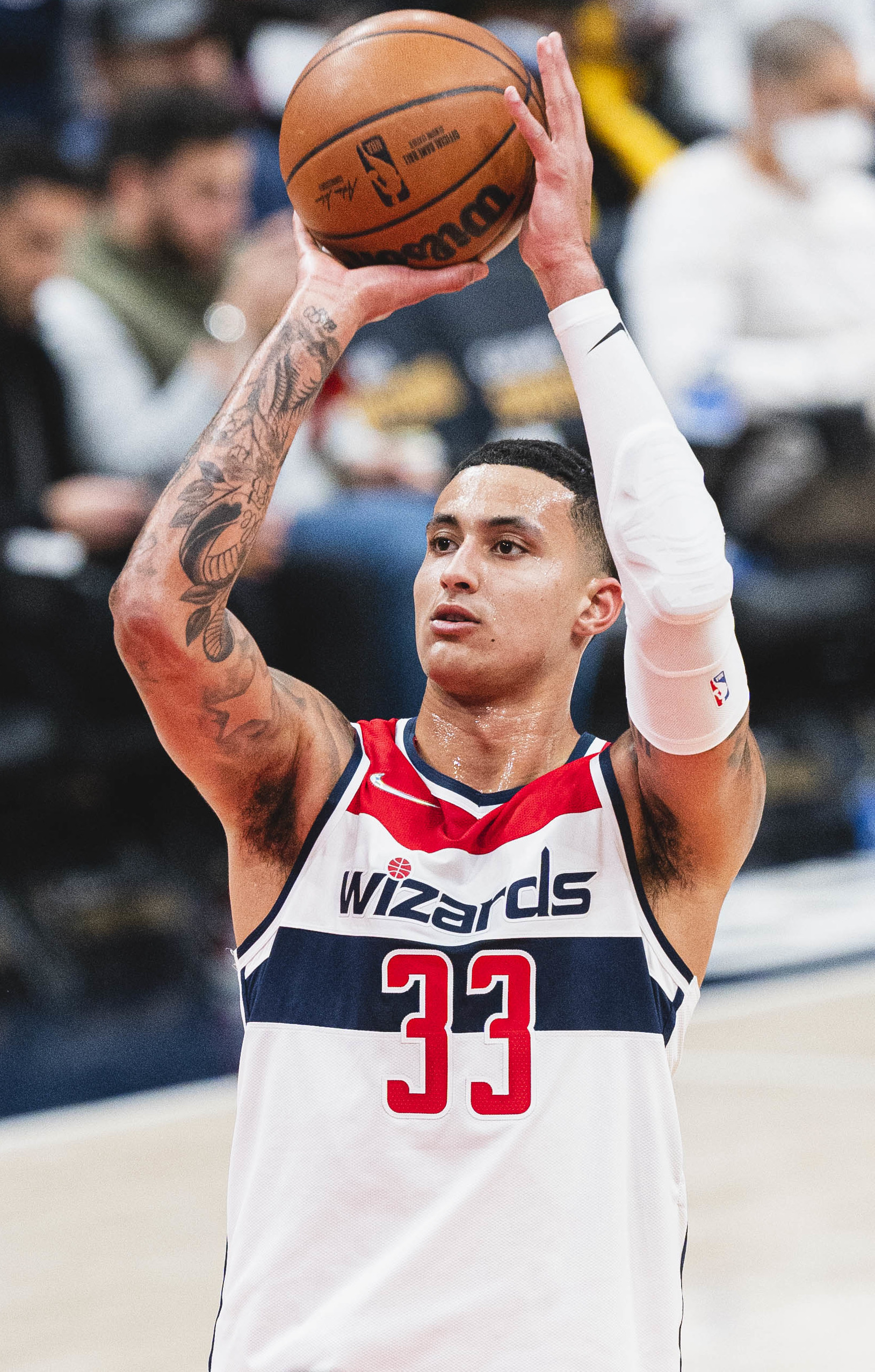
- Kuzma with the Washington Wizards in 2022

No. 18 – Milwaukee Bucks
- Position: Power forward / small forward
- League: NBA

Personal information
- Born: July 24, 1995 (age 31) Flint, Michigan, U.S.
- Listed height: 6 ft 8 in (2.03 m)
- Listed weight: 221 lb (100 kg)

Career information
- High school: Bentley (Burton, Michigan); Rise Academy (Philadelphia, Pennsylvania)
- College: Utah (2014–2017)
- NBA draft: 2017: 1st round, 27th overall pick
- Drafted by: Brooklyn Nets
- Playing career: 2017–present

Career history
- 2017–2021: Los Angeles Lakers
- 2021–2025: Washington Wizards
- 2025–present: Milwaukee Bucks

Career highlights
- NBA champion (2020); NBA All-Rookie First Team (2018); First-team All-Pac-12 (2017)
- Stats at NBA.com
- Stats at Basketball Reference

Kyle Alexander Kuzma (born July 24, 1995) is an American professional basketball player for the Milwaukee Bucks of the National Basketball Association (NBA). He played college basketball for the Utah Utes and was named first-team all-conference in the Pac-12 as a junior in 2016–17. Kuzma was selected in the first round of the 2017 NBA draft with the 27th overall pick, and he was named to the NBA All-Rookie First Team with the Los Angeles Lakers in 2018. He won an NBA championship with the Lakers in 2020 before being traded to the Washington Wizards in 2021.

== Early life ==
Born on July 24, 1995, in Flint, Michigan, Kuzma is the son of Karri Kuzma, a high school shot put champion who attended college on a track scholarship. He has a younger half-brother named Andre and a younger half-sister named Briana. Kuzma is biracial. Kuzma never met his biological father, but views the father of his half-siblings, Larry Smith, as a father figure. Karri Kuzma and Smith put a toy basketball rim in the living room for Kyle when he was only two years old, thus igniting his passion for basketball.

Kuzma has described Flint as "a really violent place [where] there's a lot of temptation to get into the streets." However, Kuzma described basketball as his "safe haven". Kuzma attended Swartz Creek Community Schools and transferred to Bentley High School in Michigan, where he averaged 17.9 points, 14.4 rebounds, 3.8 assists and 3.4 blocks per game as a junior. Kuzma sent tapes of his shooting at the YMCA to preparatory schools; Vin Sparacio, head coach at Rise Academy in Philadelphia, saw a 6 ft 6 in (1.98 m), 175 lb (79 kilograms), raw player who had a great feel for the game, and immediately brought him in. As a high school senior at Rise Academy, Kuzma averaged 22 points and seven rebounds per game. Kuzma received offers to play with Division I schools including Connecticut, Iowa State, Tennessee, and Missouri, among others, before deciding on the University of Utah.

== College career ==
Kuzma enrolled at the University of Utah in 2013. He redshirted his freshman year due to the fact that he signed late. He became a starter for the Utes in his sophomore year, when he averaged 10.8 points per game. As a junior in 2016–17, he averaged 16.4 points, 9.3 rebounds, and 2.4 assists per game, which earned him first-team All-Pac-12 honors. After the season, Kuzma decided to enter the 2017 NBA draft, forgoing his final year of college basketball eligibility. Kuzma graduated from the University of Utah with a degree in sociology.

== Professional career ==
=== Los Angeles Lakers (2017–2021) ===
Kuzma was selected with the 27th overall pick in the 2017 NBA draft by the Brooklyn Nets. However, he never played for the Nets as he was involved in a draft-day trade sending him along with Brook Lopez to the Los Angeles Lakers in exchange for D'Angelo Russell and Timofey Mozgov. Prior to the draft, Kuzma had been projected to go in the second round. On July 3, 2017, he signed his rookie scale contract with the Lakers.

During the seven games he played for the Lakers (starting in six of the games) in the 2017 NBA Summer League, Kuzma led the team in points scored and became a consistent presence during the event. He recorded averages of 21.9 points, 6.4 rebounds, 2.7 assists, 1.4 blocks, and 1.1 steals per game and was named to the All-Summer League Second Team that year. He was also named the Summer League Championship Game MVP after recording a double-double of 30 points and 10 rebounds in a 110–98 win over the Portland Trail Blazers in the championship game.

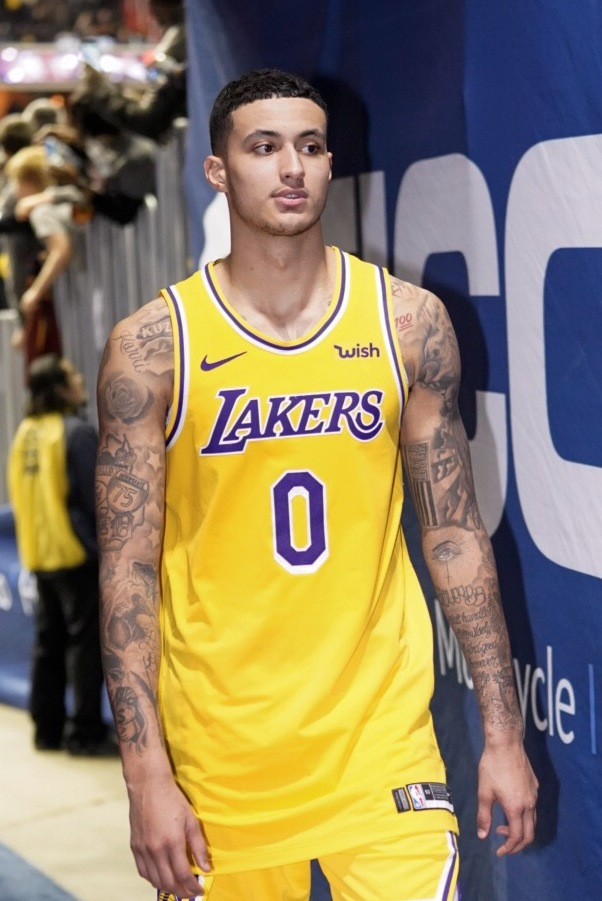
Kuzma at Capital One Arena in 2018

On November 3, 2017, in his first game as a starter, he notched his first double-double, with 21 points and 13 rebounds, in a 124–112 win over the Brooklyn Nets. On November 17, he recorded another double-double by scoring 30 points, to go with 10 rebounds, in a 122–113 loss to the Phoenix Suns. Kuzma was named the Western Conference Rookie of the Month for games played in October/November. In 20 games, he averaged a team-high 16.7 points while shooting 50.4 percent overall and a team-leading 37.9 percent on three-point field goals. He was the first ever NBA rookie to compile at least 330 points, 120 rebounds, and 30 made three-pointers in his first 20 games. He was also just the sixth non-lottery pick to win the award in the first month of his career. On December 20, he scored a career-high 38 points on 70% shooting in a 122–116 win over Houston, ending the Rockets' 14-game winning streak. In the following game, he had a team-high 27 points in a 113–106 loss versus the Golden State Warriors to become the first Lakers rookie since Jerry West in 1961 to have scored 25 or more points in three straight games. He played in the Rising Stars Challenge during the 2018 NBA All-Star Weekend, and he was named to the NBA All-Rookie First Team at the end of the season.

On October 22, 2018, Kuzma scored a season-high 37 points against the San Antonio Spurs in a 143–142 overtime loss. On January 9, 2019, he scored a career-high 41 points against the Detroit Pistons in a 113–100 win. He was selected again for the Rising Stars game and earned MVP honors after scoring a game-high 35 points.

On August 10, 2020, Kuzma scored a game-winning three pointer to lift the Lakers to a 124–121 win over the Denver Nuggets, to cap off his 25 point night. In the postseason, he scored a career playoff high 19 points in Game 3 of the NBA Finals, in a 115–104 loss against the Miami Heat. The Lakers won the series 4–2 to tie the league high with their 17th NBA championship.

On December 21, 2020, Kuzma signed a three-year, $40 million contract extension with the Lakers.

=== Washington Wizards (2021–2025) ===
On August 6, 2021, Kuzma was traded to the Washington Wizards as part of a package for Russell Westbrook. Kuzma made his Wizards debut on October 20, recording eleven points, 15 rebounds and three assists in a 98–83 win over the Toronto Raptors. On November 10, he made four three pointers in the fourth quarter of a game against the Cleveland Cavaliers, including two in the final 30 seconds to elevate the Wizards to a 97–94 win. On December 8, Kuzma recorded 26 points, seven rebounds, four assists and hit a game-winning three-pointer in a 119–116 win over the Detroit Pistons. On January 3, 2022, he scored a season-high 36 points, alongside 14 rebounds and six assists, in a 124–121 win over the Charlotte Hornets. On January 9, Kuzma grabbed a career-high 22 rebounds, alongside 27 points, in a 102–100 win over the Orlando Magic. On February 10, he recorded his first career triple-double in a 113–112 win over the Brooklyn Nets, scoring 15 points while adding 13 rebounds and 10 assists. On February 25, Kuzma tied his season high of 36 points, alongside eight rebounds, seven assists and two steals, in a 157–153 double overtime loss to the San Antonio Spurs.

On January 11, 2023, Kuzma scored 21 points and made a game-winning three-pointer in a 100–97 win over the Chicago Bulls. The next game, Kuzma scored a season-high 40 points, along with seven rebounds and seven assists in a 112–108 loss against the New York Knicks.

On June 20, 2023, Kuzma declined his $13 million player option and elected to enter free agency; however, on June 30 he signed a four-year, $102 million deal to remain with the Wizards.

=== Milwaukee Bucks (2025–present) ===
On February 6, 2025, Kuzma was traded to the Milwaukee Bucks as part of a multi-team trade. He made his Bucks debut on February 7, scoring twelve points and seven rebounds in a 107–112 loss to the Atlanta Hawks. In Game 1 of the Bucks' playoff series against the Indiana Pacers he recorded zeros in points, rebounds, assists, steals, and blocks on 0-for-5 shooting in 22 minutes of play. His performance was the sixth time in postseason history a player recorded zeros in every category, and drew comparisons to former Bucks player Tony Snell's performance in a 2017 regular-season game. Head coach Doc Rivers attributed Kuzma's lack of statistics to limited action with the ball. Kuzma finished the series with averages of 5.8 points, 2.2 rebounds and 0.8 assists per game with a 34.3% field goal percentage as the Bucks lost in five games.

On December 11, 2025, Kuzma scored a season-high and game-leading 31 points, during a 116–101 Bucks win over the Boston Celtics. On March 10, 2026, Kuzma logged 33 points on 6-of-10 three-pointers in a 114–129 loss to the Phoenix Suns.

== Career statistics ==
Legend
GP	Games played	GS	Games started	MPG	Minutes per game
FG%	Field goal percentage	3P%	3-point field goal percentage	FT%	Free throw percentage
RPG	Rebounds per game	APG	Assists per game	SPG	Steals per game
BPG	Blocks per game	PPG	Points per game	**Bold**	Career high

=== NBA ===
==== Regular season ====
Year	Team	GP	GS	MPG	FG%	3P%	FT%	RPG	APG	SPG	BPG	PPG
2017–18	L.A. Lakers	**77**	37	31.2	.450	**.366**	.707	6.3	1.8	.6	.4	16.1
2018–19	L.A. Lakers	70	68	33.1	.456	.303	.752	5.5	2.5	.6	.4	18.7
2019–20†	L.A. Lakers	61	9	25.0	.436	.316	.735	4.5	1.3	.5	.4	12.8
2020–21	L.A. Lakers	68	32	28.7	.443	.361	.691	6.1	1.9	.5	.6	12.9
2021–22	Washington	66	66	33.4	.452	.341	.712	**8.5**	3.5	.6	**.9**	17.1
2022–23	Washington	64	64	**35.0**	.448	.333	.730	7.2	3.7	.6	.5	21.2
2023–24	Washington	70	**70**	32.6	.463	.336	**.775**	6.6	**4.2**	.5	.7	**22.2**
2024–25	Washington	32	30	27.7	.420	.281	.602	5.8	2.5	.6	.2	15.2
2024–25	Milwaukee	33	32	31.8	.455	.333	.663	5.6	2.2	.5	.4	14.5
2025–26	Milwaukee	69	43	26.2	**.492**	.347	.726	4.5	2.7	**.7**	.4	13.0
Career		610	451	30.6	.453	.335	.721	6.1	2.7	.6	.5	16.6

==== Playoffs ====
Year	Team	GP	GS	MPG	FG%	3P%	FT%	RPG	APG	SPG	BPG	PPG
2020†	L.A. Lakers	**21**	0	**23.0**	**.430**	**.313**	**.784**	3.1	.8	**.3**	**.3**	**10.0**
2021	L.A. Lakers	6	0	21.5	.292	.174	.667	**3.8**	**1.2**	**.3**	.2	6.3
2025	Milwaukee	5	**4**	20.4	.343	.200	.500	2.2	.8	.0	.2	5.8
Career		32	4	22.3	.393	.276	.731	3.1	.9	.3	.3	8.6

=== College ===
Year	Team	GP	GS	MPG	FG%	3P%	FT%	RPG	APG	SPG	BPG	PPG
2014–15	Utah	31	0	8.1	.456	**.324**	.556	1.8	.6	.0	.2	3.3
2015–16	Utah	**36**	**35**	24.1	**.522**	.255	.611	5.7	1.4	.3	.4	10.8
2016–17	Utah	29	29	**30.8**	.504	.321	**.669**	**9.3**	**2.4**	**.6**	**.5**	**16.4**
Career		96	64	21.0	.506	.302	.631	5.6	1.5	.3	.4	10.1

== Awards and honors ==
NBA

- NBA champion 2020
- NBA Rising Stars Challenge MVP (2019)
- 2× Rising Stars Challenge (2018, 2019)
- NBA All-Rookie First Team (2018)

College

- First-team All-Pac-12 (2017)

== Business ventures ==
In April 2026, Kuzma joined UIM E1 World Championship team Sierra Racing Club as co-owner and global brand ambassador, alongside co-owners Kerem Ozmen, Dominik Madani, and Belgian goalkeeper Thibaut Courtois. Sierra Racing Club competes in the all-electric hydrofoil powerboat series and is the only team in the championship with a direct connection to the aerospace industry through its parent company, Sierra Space. Kuzma cited the series' growth potential in comparison to Formula One's expansion following the release of the Drive to Survive documentary series on Netflix.

In 2020, Kuzma met former Knicks director of performance Bar Malik through a mutual business partner. Malik tested one of his drink formulas on Kuzma, who drank it during the 2020 NBA Finals. Afterwards, Kuzma and Malik decided to become business partners and co-found Drink Barcode, which produces the Barcode fitness water beverage.

== Personal life ==
Kuzma has been in a relationship with Canadian model Winnie Harlow since 2020. Kuzma and Harlow announced their engagement via social media on February 19, 2025.

In July 2026, Kuzma drew online attention for criticizing New York City Mayor Zohran Mamdani as "a mayor playing president," following a video in which Mamdani spoke about arresting Israeli Prime Minister Benjamin Netanyahu, who was wanted by the ICC for crimes against humanity in Gaza.
