= Bentley High School =

Bentley High School may refer to:

- Bentley High School (Burton, Michigan), a school in Burton, Michigan
- Bentley High School (Livonia, Michigan), a school in Livonia, Michigan
