= Taurean Prince =

American basketball player (born 1994)

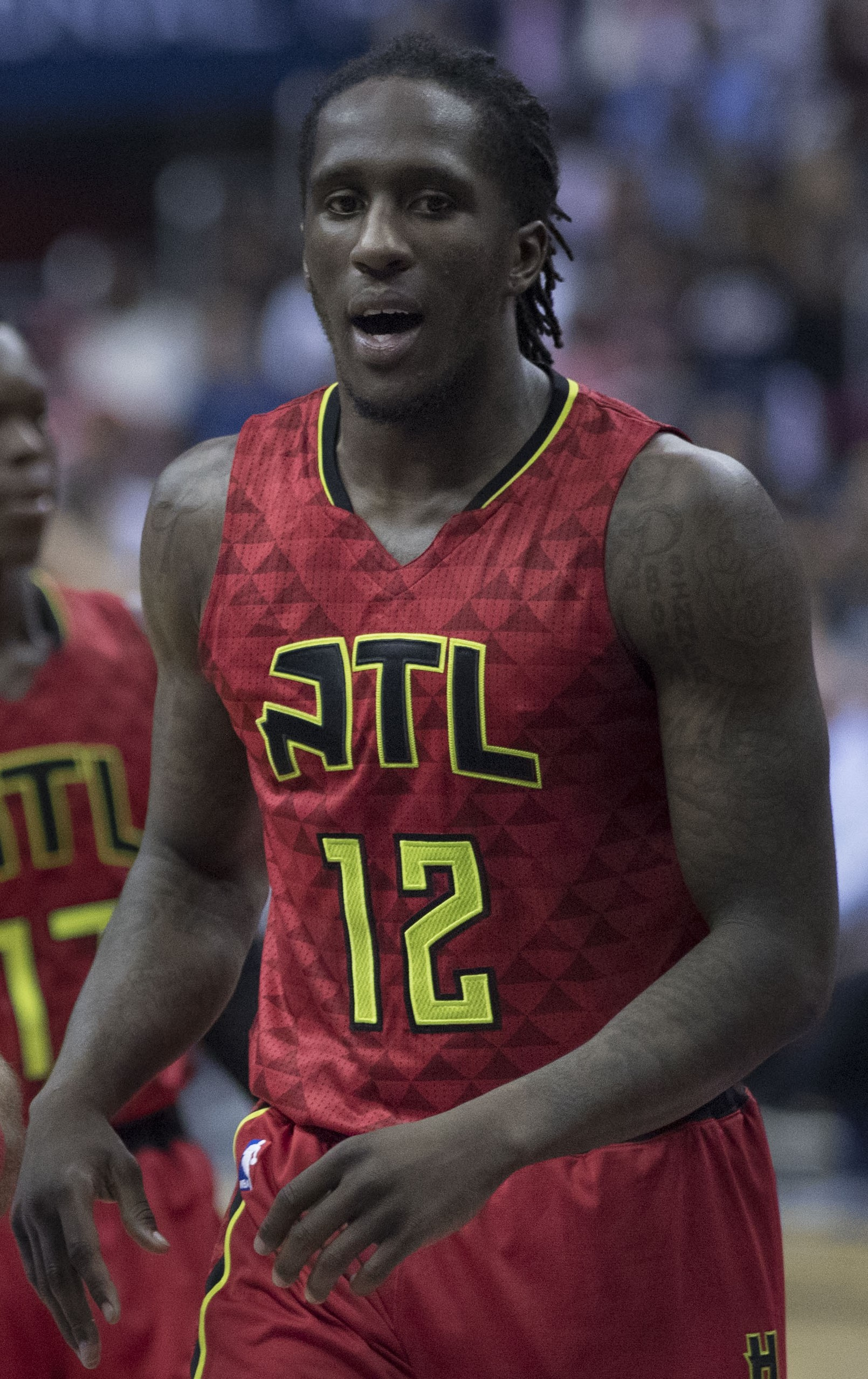
- Prince with the Atlanta Hawks in 2017

No. 12 – Detroit Pistons
- Position: Small forward
- League: NBA

Personal information
- Born: March 22, 1994 (age 32) San Marcos, Texas, U.S.
- Listed height: 6 ft 6 in (1.98 m)
- Listed weight: 218 lb (99 kg)

Career information
- High school: Earl Warren (San Antonio, Texas)
- College: Baylor (2012–2016)
- NBA draft: 2016: 1st round, 12th overall pick
- Drafted by: Utah Jazz
- Playing career: 2016–present

Career history
- 2016–2019: Atlanta Hawks
- 2016–2017: →Long Island Nets
- 2019–2021: Brooklyn Nets
- 2021: Cleveland Cavaliers
- 2021–2023: Minnesota Timberwolves
- 2023–2024: Los Angeles Lakers
- 2024–2026: Milwaukee Bucks
- 2026–present: Detroit Pistons

Career highlights
- 2× NBA Cup champion (2023, 2024); First-team All-Big 12 (2016); Second-team All-Big 12 (2015); Big 12 Sixth Man Award (2015)
- Stats at NBA.com
- Stats at Basketball Reference
Medals
Representing the United States
Pan American Games
Bronze medal – third place	2015 Toronto	National team

Taurean Waller-Prince (/ˈtɔːriən/ TOR-ee-ən; born March 22, 1994) is an American professional basketball player for the Detroit Pistons of the National Basketball Association (NBA). He played college basketball for the Baylor Bears. He was selected by the Utah Jazz with the 12th overall pick in the 2016 NBA draft, but his draft rights were traded to the Atlanta Hawks. Prince played three seasons for the Hawks before being traded to the Brooklyn Nets in 2019. He has also played for the Cleveland Cavaliers, Minnesota Timberwolves, Los Angeles Lakers, and Milwaukee Bucks.

== High school career ==
Prince played three seasons of high school basketball under head coach Jim Weaver at Earl Warren High School in San Antonio, Texas. As a senior, he led the team to the state semifinals. He originally chose to play college basketball with the LIU Brooklyn Blackbirds, but switched to Baylor due to a coaching change within the former program.

== College career ==
Prince played 24 games off the bench in his freshman season. He finished the year averaging 3.7 points and 2.2 rebounds in 6.4 minutes per game. In the spring prior to his sophomore season, Prince was on the Big 12 Conference Commissioner's Honor Roll. After averaging 6.2 points and 2.8 rebounds in 14.2 minutes per game and appearing in all 38 of Baylor's games, he won the Big 12 Sixth Man Award and earned all-conference honors. Entering his fourth season, Fran Fraschilla labeled him as a strong candidate for Big 12 Player of the Year in 2015–16.

== Professional career ==
=== Atlanta Hawks (2016–2019) ===
On June 23, 2016, Prince was selected by the Utah Jazz with the 12th overall pick in the 2016 NBA draft. His rights were later traded to the Atlanta Hawks on July 7 in a three-team deal also involving the Indiana Pacers the Jazz received George Hill and the Pacers received Jeff Teague. On July 15, he signed his rookie-scale contract with the Hawks. On March 11, 2017, he had a then season-best 17 points in a 107–90 win over the Memphis Grizzlies. On April 6, he scored a career-high 20 points in a 123–116 win over the Boston Celtics. With 11 points in Game 4 of the Hawks' first-round playoff series against the Washington Wizards, Prince became the first Hawks rookie to reach double-figures in his first four playoff games since Pete Maravich did it in five straight in 1971. During his rookie season, Prince had multiple assignments with the Long Island Nets of the NBA Development League, pursuant to the flexible assignment rule.

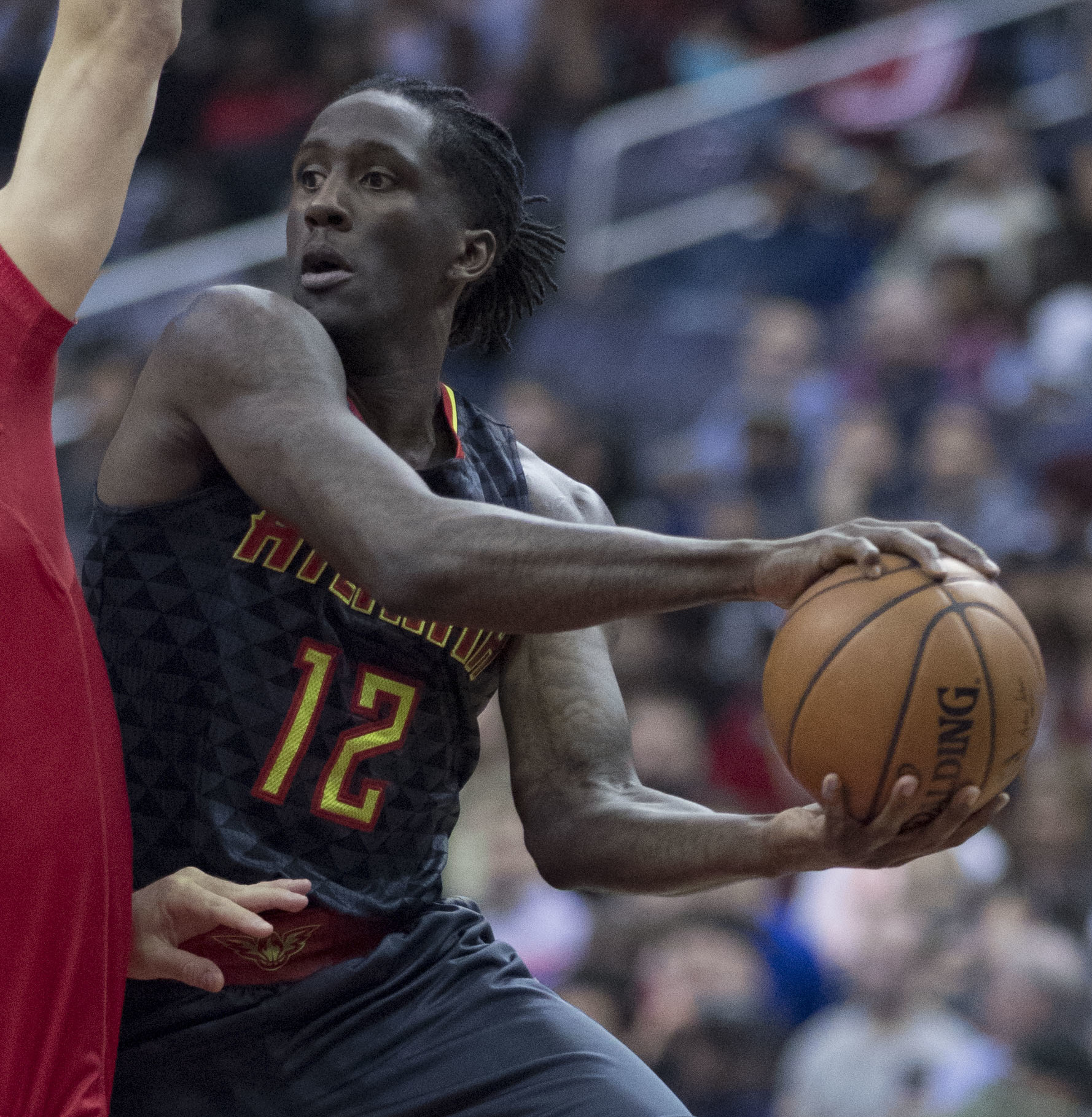
Prince with the Atlanta Hawks in 2017

On December 12, 2017, Prince scored a career-high 24 points in a 123–114 loss to the Cleveland Cavaliers. Three days later, he made a career-high five 3-pointers and had 17 points in a 96–94 loss to the Memphis Grizzlies. On December 29, he had a career-high 30 points and 10 rebounds in a 111–98 loss to the Toronto Raptors. Prince matched a career high with five 3-pointers and extended his career-high streak of games with at least one 3-pointer to 17. On February 2, 2018, he set a new career high with 31 points in a 119–110 loss to the Boston Celtics. On March 11, he set a new career high with 38 points in a 129–122 loss to the Chicago Bulls. Six days later, he had another 38-point effort in a 122–117 loss to the Milwaukee Bucks. On April 8, he made seven of eight 3-pointers to score 33 points in a 112–106 win over the Celtics.

On October 19, in just the second game of the season, Prince scored a season-high 28 points against the Grizzlies. On January 13, 2019, against the Bucks, Prince returned to action after missing 18 games with a left ankle sprain.

=== Brooklyn Nets (2019–2021) ===
On July 6, 2019, Prince, alongside a 2021 second-round pick, was traded to the Brooklyn Nets in exchange for Allen Crabbe, the draft rights to Nickeil Alexander-Walker, and a protected 2020 first-round pick. On October 21, Prince, signed a two-year, $29 million contract extension with the Nets. He made his Nets debut two days later, recording 15 points, eleven rebounds, two assists and two steals in a 127–126 overtime loss to the Minnesota Timberwolves. On November 1, Prince scored a season-high 27 points, alongside twelve rebounds, in a 123–116 win over the Houston Rockets. In March 2020, the NBA season was suspended due to the COVID-19 pandemic. After the game on November 12, 2019, against the Utah Jazz, Prince traded jerseys with former Baylor Bears teammate Royce O'Neale. In July, Prince tested positive for COVID-19 and sat out for the restart of the season in the NBA Bubble.

=== Cleveland Cavaliers (2021) ===
On January 14, 2021, Prince and center Jarrett Allen were traded to the Cleveland Cavaliers in a multi-player, four-team deal with the Houston Rockets and Indiana Pacers that sent James Harden to Brooklyn. Prince made his Cavaliers debut on January 20, recording 17 points, seven rebounds and four assists in a 147–135 double-overtime win over the Brooklyn Nets. On April 14, he scored a season-high 25 points, alongside four rebounds and three assists, in a 103–90 win over the Charlotte Hornets. On April 27, Prince underwent a successful left ankle arthroscopic surgery after missing three games with left ankle soreness. The surgery subsequently ended his season.

=== Minnesota Timberwolves (2021–2023) ===
On August 3, 2021, Prince, alongside a 2022 second-round pick and cash considerations, was traded to the Minnesota Timberwolves in exchange for Ricky Rubio. Prince made his Timberwolves debut on October 20, recording five points, three rebounds and two assists in a 124–106 win over the Houston Rockets. On February 1, 2022, he scored a season-high 23 points, alongside nine rebounds, two assists and two steals, in a 130–115 win over the Denver Nuggets. Two days later, Prince again scored 23 points, alongside six rebounds, in a 128–117 win over the Detroit Pistons. After a play-in tournament win over the Los Angeles Clippers, the Timberwolves qualified for the playoffs for the first time since 2018. However, they fell to the Memphis Grizzlies in six games during the first round.

On June 30, 2022, Prince signed a two-year, $16 million contract extension with the Timberwolves.

=== Los Angeles Lakers (2023–2024) ===
On July 6, 2023, Prince signed a one-year, $4.5 million contract with the Los Angeles Lakers. On December 9, Prince and the Lakers won the inaugural season of the NBA In-Season Tournament. He made 78 appearances (49 starts) for Los Angeles during the 2023–24 NBA season, averaging 8.9 points, 2.9 rebounds, and 1.5 assists.

=== Milwaukee Bucks (2024–2026) ===
On July 9, 2024, Prince signed a minimum deal with the Milwaukee Bucks. On December 17, Prince and the Bucks won the 2024 NBA Cup, which made Prince the first player in history to win multiple Cup titles. He made 80 appearances (73 starts) for Milwaukee during the 2024–25 NBA season, averaging 8.2 points, 3.6 rebounds, and 1.9 assists.

On July 1, 2025, Prince re-signed with the Bucks on a two-year, $7.1 million contract. On November 13, Prince suffered a herniated disc in his neck, and was ruled out indefinitely after undergoing surgery. On March 10, 2026, Prince made his return during a loss to the Phoenix Suns after being out for four months. On April 10, he recorded 18 points, 10 rebounds, and five assists in a 125–108 victory over the Brooklyn Nets.

=== Detroit Pistons (2026–present) ===
On July 8, 2026, Prince was traded to the Detroit Pistons in a six-team trade.

== National team career ==
In the summer of 2015, following his junior season, Prince helped the United States men's national basketball team win the bronze medal at the 2015 Pan American Games. He was on a team led by Bobby Brown and Anthony Randolph.

== Career statistics ==
Legend
GP	Games played	GS	Games started	MPG	Minutes per game
FG%	Field goal percentage	3P%	3-point field goal percentage	FT%	Free throw percentage
RPG	Rebounds per game	APG	Assists per game	SPG	Steals per game
BPG	Blocks per game	PPG	Points per game	**Bold**	Career high
*	Led the league

=== NBA ===
==== Regular season ====
Year	Team	GP	GS	MPG	FG%	3P%	FT%	RPG	APG	SPG	BPG	PPG
2016–17	Atlanta	59	10	16.6	.400	.324	.787	2.7	.9	.7	.5	5.7
2017–18	Atlanta	**82***	**82***	**30.0**	.426	.385	.844	4.7	**2.6**	**1.0**	.5	**14.1**
2018–19	Atlanta	55	47	28.2	.441	.390	.819	3.6	2.1	**1.0**	.3	13.5
2019–20	Brooklyn	64	61	29.0	.376	.339	.798	**6.0**	1.8	.9	.4	12.1
2020–21	Brooklyn	12	4	18.1	.405	.351	.889	2.8	.6	.7	**.7**	8.1
2020–21	Cleveland	29	6	23.7	.399	.415	.837	3.7	2.4	.7	.5	10.1
2021–22	Minnesota	69	8	17.1	.454	.376	.756	2.5	1.0	.7	.3	7.3
2022–23	Minnesota	54	4	22.1	**.467**	.381	.844	2.4	1.6	.5	.3	9.1
2023–24	L.A. Lakers	78	49	27.0	.442	.396	.735	2.9	1.5	.7	.4	8.9
2024–25	Milwaukee	80	73	27.1	.457	**.439**	.813	3.6	1.9	**1.0**	.2	8.2
2025–26	Milwaukee	26	7	23.5	.450	.436	**1.000**	3.1	1.8	0.6	.2	9.2
Career		608	351	24.7	.429	.387	.812	3.6	1.7	.8	.4	9.8

==== Playoffs ====
Year	Team	GP	GS	MPG	FG%	3P%	FT%	RPG	APG	SPG	BPG	PPG
2017	Atlanta	**6**	**6**	**31.2**	**.558**	.286	**1.000**	**5.3**	**1.3**	.3	.2	**11.2**
2022	Minnesota	5	0	13.1	.370	.286	.857	1.6	1.2	.4	.2	6.0
2023	Minnesota	5	1	20.0	.364	**.381**	.778	1.4	.8	**.6**	.2	7.8
2024	L.A. Lakers	5	0	22.2	.414	.294	**1.000**	2.4	.6	.2	**.4**	7.4
2025	Milwaukee	5	2	15.0	.200	.222	-	1.0	**1.6**	.4	.0	1.2
Career		26	9	20.7	.430	.307	.897	2.5	1.1	.4	.2	6.9

=== College ===
Year	Team	GP	GS	MPG	FG%	3P%	FT%	RPG	APG	SPG	BPG	PPG
2012–13	Baylor	24	0	6.4	.583	.3	.727	2.2	.1	.4	.1	3.7
2013–14	Baylor	**38**	2	14.3	.465	.366	.709	2.8	.6	.5	.2	6.2
2014–15	Baylor	33	6	26.3	**.472**	**.395**	.644	5.6	1.3	**1.5**	**.9**	13.9
2015–16	Baylor	34	**34**	**30.6**	.432	.361	**.774**	**6.1**	**2.3**	1.3	.7	**15.9**
Career		129	42	20.2	.460	.376	.718	4.2	1.1	.9	.5	10.2

== Personal life ==
On August 25, 2022, Prince was arrested on a "fugitive warrant-out-of-state extradite" at Miami International Airport on account of a "dangerous drugs" charge from Texas. On November 19, 2022, it was announced that Prince would not face charges despite the arrest.

Prince is a Muslim and talked about fasting for Ramadan in a post-game interview.

Prince honored his mother, Tamiyko, by wearing her maiden name, Waller, on the back of his jersey as Waller-Prince while playing for the Baylor Bears.
