= A. J. Green (basketball) =

American basketball player (born 1999)

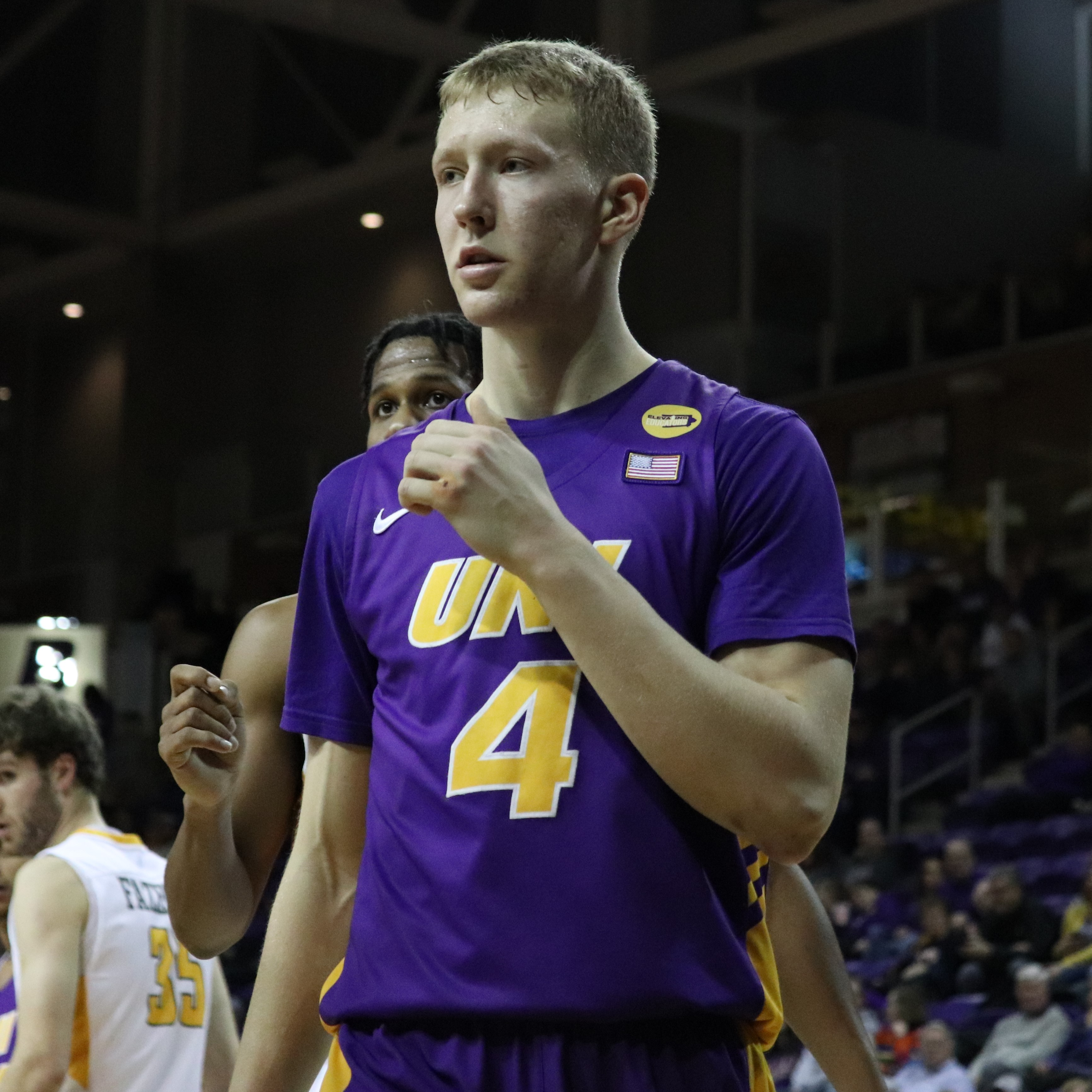
- Green with Northern Iowa in 2019

No. 20 – Milwaukee Bucks
- Position: Shooting guard
- League: NBA

Personal information
- Born: September 27, 1999 (age 27) Cedar Falls, Iowa, U.S.
- Listed height: 6 ft 4 in (1.93 m)
- Listed weight: 190 lb (86 kg)

Career information
- High school: Cedar Falls (Cedar Falls, Iowa)
- College: Northern Iowa (2018–2022)
- NBA draft: 2022: undrafted
- Playing career: 2022–present

Career history
- 2022–present: Milwaukee Bucks
- 2022–2024: →Wisconsin Herd

Career highlights
- NBA Cup champion (2024); 2× MVC Player of the Year (2020, 2022); 2× First-team All-MVC (2020, 2022); Third-team All-MVC (2019); MVC Freshman of the Year (2019); No. 4 retired by Northern Iowa Panthers
- Stats at NBA.com
- Stats at Basketball Reference

Austin Jahn Green (born September 27, 1999) is an American professional basketball player for the Milwaukee Bucks of the National Basketball Association (NBA). He played college basketball for the Northern Iowa Panthers.

== Early life ==
Green attended Holmes Junior High School, where he first decided he wanted to play college basketball. He played for Cedar Falls High School on the basketball team as well as the Iowa Barnstormers in AAU play. As a senior, he averaged 26 points per game and became Cedar Falls' all-time leading scorer. He led the team to a state championship.

=== Recruiting ===
Green was a consensus four-star recruit and was considered the No. 78 player in the 2018 class by ESPN. On August 11, 2017, he committed to play college basketball for Northern Iowa, where his father was a member of the coaching staff. Green became the highest-rated player to ever commit to Northern Iowa and the program's first four-star recruit. He chose the Panthers over Power 5 offers from Clemson, Iowa State, Minnesota, Nebraska and Virginia.

College recruiting
Name	Hometown	School	Height	Weight	Commit date
A. J. Green; PG	Cedar Falls, IA	Cedar Falls (IA)	6 ft 3 in (1.91 m)	165 lb (75 kg)	Aug 11, 2017
A. J. Green; PG	Recruit ratings: Rivals: 247Sports: ESPN: (84)				
Overall recruit ranking: Rivals: 94 247Sports: 80 ESPN: 78
Note: In many cases, Scout, Rivals, 247Sports, On3, and ESPN may conflict in their listings of height and weight.; In these cases, the average was taken. ESPN grades are on a 100-point scale.; Sources: "Northern Iowa 2018 Basketball Commitments". Rivals.; "2018 Northern Iowa Panthers Recruiting Class". ESPN.; "2018 Team Ranking". Rivals.

== College career ==
As a freshman, Green averaged 15 points per game. However, he struggled with turnovers, with 77 assists to 94 turnovers. Green was named Missouri Valley Conference Freshman of the Year, becoming the first Northern Iowa player to receive the honor since Seth Tuttle in 2012, as well as Third Team All-MVC. On January 4, 2020, Green scored a career-high 35 points in a 69–64 win over Bradley. He had 34 points on February 8, in an 83–73 win over Drake. On February 12, Green scored 27 points in a 71–63 win over Illinois State and surpassed the 1,000-point threshold. At the conclusion of the regular season, Green was named MVC Player of the Year. He averaged 19.7 points and 3.0 assists per game as a sophomore. Following the season, Green declared for the 2020 NBA draft. However, on July 30, 2020, he withdrew from the draft and decided to return to Northern Iowa for his junior season.

On December 13, 2020, Panthers head coach Ben Jacobson announced that Green would undergo hip surgery and miss the remainder of the 2020–21 season. He only appeared in 3 games, averaging 22.3 points, 5.7 rebounds and 2.7 assists per game. The following season, Green returned and averaged 18.8 points, 3.7 rebounds, and 2.5 assists per game, culminating in his second selection as MVC Player of the Year. On April 20, 2022, Green entered the transfer portal while also declaring for the 2022 NBA draft and maintaining his college eligibility. However, on June 1, 2022, he announced he would remain in the draft and forego his remaining eligibility.

== Professional career ==
=== Milwaukee Bucks (2022–present) ===
After going undrafted in the 2022 NBA draft, Green signed a two-way contract with the Milwaukee Bucks. Green joined the Bucks' 2022 NBA Summer League roster. In his Summer League debut, Green scored fourteen points in a 94–90 win against the Brooklyn Nets.

On July 7, 2023, Green signed a standard contract with the Bucks. The contract was for three years and $6.3 million, including $1.9 million guaranteed at signing. On February 9, 2024, Green scored a career-high 27 points during a 125–109 loss to the Minnesota Timberwolves.

Green made 73 appearances (seven starts) for Milwaukee during the 2024–25 NBA season, averaging 7.4 points, 2.4 rebounds, and 1.5 assists. On April 29, 2025, during the first round of the playoffs, Green recorded 19 points and four rebounds in a 119–118 Game 5 overtime loss against the Indiana Pacers, eliminating the Bucks from the playoffs.

On October 16, 2025, Green signed a four-year, $45 million contract extension with the Bucks.

On April 10, 2026, Green put a career-high 35 points on a career-high 11 three-pointers made in a 125–108 win over the Brooklyn Nets. His 11 three-pointers made set a record for the most three-pointers made in a game in Bucks franchise history. On April 12, Green put up 19 points with five three-pointers made in a 126–106 loss to the Philadelphia 76ers. Green also surpassed Ray Allen (229) for the most three-pointers made in a season in Bucks franchise history with 232.

== Career statistics ==
Legend
GP	Games played	GS	Games started	MPG	Minutes per game
FG%	Field goal percentage	3P%	3-point field goal percentage	FT%	Free throw percentage
RPG	Rebounds per game	APG	Assists per game	SPG	Steals per game
BPG	Blocks per game	PPG	Points per game	**Bold**	Career high

=== NBA ===
==== Regular season ====
Year	Team	GP	GS	MPG	FG%	3P%	FT%	RPG	APG	SPG	BPG	PPG
2022–23	Milwaukee	35	1	9.9	.424	.419	**1.000**	1.3	.6	.2	.0	4.4
2023–24	Milwaukee	56	0	11.0	.423	.408	.895	1.1	.5	.2	**.1**	4.5
2024–25	Milwaukee	73	7	22.7	**.429**	**.427**	.815	2.4	1.5	**.5**	**.1**	7.4
2025–26	Milwaukee	**78**	**68**	**29.1**	.424	.419	.855	**2.7**	**1.9**	**.5**	**.1**	**10.4**
Career		242	76	20.2	.426	.420	.857	2.0	1.3	.4	.1	7.3

==== Playoffs ====
Year	Team	GP	GS	MPG	FG%	3P%	FT%	RPG	APG	SPG	BPG	PPG
2024	Milwaukee	**6**	0	11.2	.375	.182	**1.000**	1.5	.3	.0	.0	2.8
2025	Milwaukee	5	**1**	**27.0**	**.462**	**.514**	.500	**2.8**	**2.0**	.0	**.2**	**11.0**
Career		11	1	18.4	.436	.435	.800	2.1	1.1	.0	.1	6.5

=== College ===
Year	Team	GP	GS	MPG	FG%	3P%	FT%	RPG	APG	SPG	BPG	PPG
2018–19	Northern Iowa	**34**	**34**	29.9	.410	.348	.864	3.0	2.3	.6	.1	15.0
2019–20	Northern Iowa	31	31	34.8	.416	.391	**.917**	3.0	**3.0**	.7	.0	19.7
2020–21	Northern Iowa	3	3	36.3	**.464**	**.407**	.667	**5.7**	2.7	**1.3**	**.7**	**22.3**
2021–22	Northern Iowa	31	31	**36.4**	.410	.388	.915	3.7	2.5	.8	.0	18.8
Career		99	99	33.7	.414	.378	.900	3.3	2.6	.7	.1	17.9

== Personal life ==
Green's father, Kyle Green, is a former associate head basketball coach for Iowa State and now the Head Coach for Northern Iowa. He was previously an assistant coach and later associate head coach for Northern Iowa. Kyle played NCAA Division III basketball for Hamline University before spending one season professionally in Denmark, where he also began his coaching career. Green's mother, Michele, played basketball for Hamline and is a chiropractor. Green's younger sister, Emerson, played basketball for Cedar Falls High School and is now playing at Northern Iowa.

== See also ==
- List of NBA career 3-point field goal percentage leaders
