= Andre Jackson Jr. =

American basketball player (born 2001)

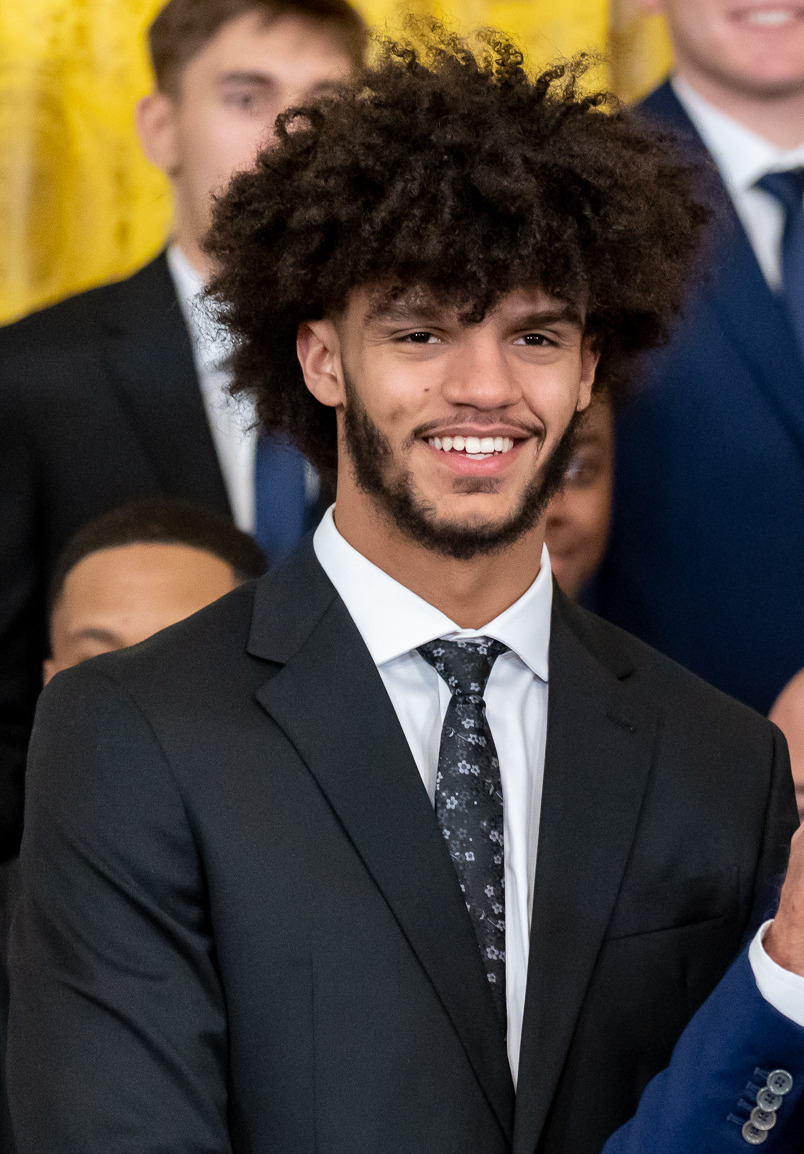
- Jackson in 2023

No. 44 – Raptors 905
- Position: Shooting guard / small forward
- League: NBA G League

Personal information
- Born: November 13, 2001 (age 25) Amsterdam, New York, U.S.
- Listed height: 6 ft 6 in (1.98 m)
- Listed weight: 209 lb (95 kg)

Career information
- High school: The Albany Academy (Albany, New York)
- College: UConn (2020–2023)
- NBA draft: 2023: 2nd round, 36th overall pick
- Drafted by: Orlando Magic
- Playing career: 2023–present

Career history
- 2023–2026: Milwaukee Bucks
- 2024: →Wisconsin Herd
- 2026–present: Raptors 905

Career highlights
- NBA Cup champion (2024); NCAA champion (2023)
- Stats at NBA.com
- Stats at Basketball Reference

Andre Terrell Jackson Jr. (born November 13, 2001) is an American professional basketball player for the Raptors 905 of the NBA G League. He played college basketball for the UConn Huskies.

== Early life and high school career ==
Jackson grew up in Amsterdam, New York and attended The Albany Academy. Jackson played on the United States select team in the 2018 Albert Schweitzer Tournament. He averaged 18.8 points, 10.1 rebounds, 5.1 assists, and three steals per game during his senior season and was named the New York Sports Writers Association Class A Player of the Year. Jackson committed to play college basketball at UConn over offers from Iowa, Maryland, UCLA, and Syracuse.

== College career ==
Jackson played in 16 games during his freshman season at UConn and averaged 2.7 points, 2.9 rebounds, and 1.6 assists per game. He missed seven games due to a broken left wrist. Jackson started all but one of the Huskies' games as a sophomore and averaged 6.8 points and 6.8 rebounds per game.

Jackson was named a team captain entering his junior season. He missed the first three games of the season after fracturing the pinky finger on his right hand during preseason practices. Jackson started the 2023 national championship game and scored three points with six assists, three rebounds, and two steals as the Huskies won 76–59.

== Professional career ==
=== Milwaukee Bucks (2023–2026) ===
Jackson was selected with the 36th overall pick in the 2023 NBA draft by the Orlando Magic, and was traded on draft night to the Milwaukee Bucks. On January 14, 2024, Jackson recorded his first career double-double, with 10 points and 10 rebounds, during a 129–118 win over the Golden State Warriors. He made 57 appearances for Milwaukee during his rookie campaign, recording averages of 2.2 points and 2.0 rebounds.

Jackson played in 67 games (including 43 starts) for the Bucks during the 2024–25 NBA season, logging averages of 3.4 points, 2.7 rebounds, and 1.2 assists. He made 48 appearances (including one starts) for Milwaukee in the 2025–26 season, averaging 2.4 points and 1.5 assists.

=== Toronto Raptors (2026) ===
On August 5, 2026, Jackson signed with the Toronto Raptors on an Exhibit 10 contract to compete for a roster spot.

== Career statistics ==
Legend
GP	Games played	GS	Games started	MPG	Minutes per game
FG%	Field goal percentage	3P%	3-point field goal percentage	FT%	Free throw percentage
RPG	Rebounds per game	APG	Assists per game	SPG	Steals per game
BPG	Blocks per game	PPG	Points per game	**Bold**	Career high

=== NBA ===
==== Regular season ====
Year	Team	GP	GS	MPG	FG%	3P%	FT%	RPG	APG	SPG	BPG	PPG
2023–24	Milwaukee	57	8	10.0	**.500**	.370	**.727**	2.0	.9	.3	.1	2.2
2024–25	Milwaukee	**67**	**43**	**14.6**	.477	**.395**	.500	**2.7**	**1.2**	**.5**	**.2**	**3.4**
2025–26	Milwaukee	48	1	8.5	.328	.250	.625	1.5	.9	.4	.1	2.4
Career		172	52	11.4	.440	.341	.597	2.1	1.0	.4	.1	2.7

==== Playoffs ====
Year	Team	GP	GS	MPG	FG%	3P%	FT%	RPG	APG	SPG	BPG	PPG
2024	Milwaukee	**5**	0	**11.9**	**.455**	**.333**	—	**2.2**	**2.0**	**1.0**	**.2**	**2.4**
2025	Milwaukee	2	0	2.5	.000	.000	—	.0	.0	.0	.0	.0
Career		7	0	9.3	.417	.286	—	1.6	1.4	.7	.1	1.7

=== College ===
Year	Team	GP	GS	MPG	FG%	3P%	FT%	RPG	APG	SPG	BPG	PPG
2020–21	UConn	16	2	16.1	.410	.118	**.900**	2.9	1.6	.4	.3	2.7
2021–22	UConn	33	**32**	**29.2**	.426	**.361**	.714	**6.8**	3.1	**1.2**	**.6**	**6.8**
2022–23	UConn	**36**	31	29.1	**.432**	.281	.646	6.2	**4.7**	1.1	.5	6.7
Career		85	65	26.7	.428	.293	.702	5.8	3.5	1.0	.5	6.0

== Personal life ==
Both of Jackson's parents, Tricia Altieri and Andre Jackson Sr., played college basketball at Fulton–Montgomery Community College.
