= Jericho Sims =

American basketball player (born 1998)

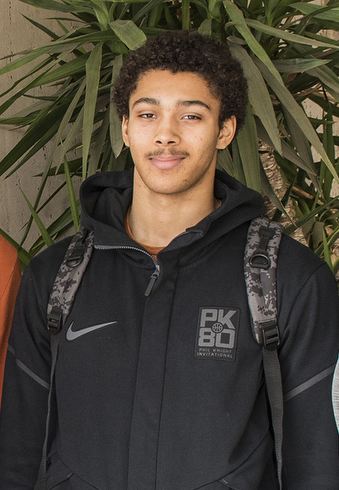
- Sims with Texas in 2018

No. 00 – Milwaukee Bucks
- Position: Center
- League: NBA

Personal information
- Born: October 20, 1998 (age 28) Minneapolis, Minnesota, U.S.
- Listed height: 6 ft 10 in (2.08 m)
- Listed weight: 250 lb (113 kg)

Career information
- High school: Cristo Rey Jesuit (Minneapolis, Minnesota)
- College: Texas (2017–2021)
- NBA draft: 2021: 2nd round, 58th overall pick
- Drafted by: New York Knicks
- Playing career: 2021–present

Career history
- 2021–2025: New York Knicks
- 2021–2023: →Westchester Knicks
- 2025–present: Milwaukee Bucks

Career highlights
- NIT champion (2019)
- Stats at NBA.com
- Stats at Basketball Reference

Jericho Eduard Sims (born October 20, 1998) is an American professional basketball player for the Milwaukee Bucks of the National Basketball Association (NBA). He played college basketball for the Texas Longhorns.

== High School career ==
Sims attended Cristo Rey Jesuit High School in Minneapolis, Minnesota. In his junior season, he averaged 21.8 points, 11.2 rebounds and 3.7 assists per game. As a senior, he averaged 25 points and 10 rebounds per game. Sims left as Cristo Rey Jesuit's all-time leading scorer, with 2,005 points. A consensus four-star recruit, he committed to playing college basketball for Texas, choosing the Longhorns over Minnesota.

== College career ==
As a freshman at Texas, Sims averaged five points and 3.9 rebounds per game. He assumed a more important role late in the season after an injury to Mo Bamba. He averaged 4.2 points and 3.6 rebounds per game as a sophomore while missing time with an ankle injury. Sims' junior season was cut short by a stress fracture in his back against Baylor on February 10, 2020. As a junior, he averaged 9.7 points, 8.2 rebounds and 1.2 blocks per game, earning All-Big 12 Honorable Mention. On March 13, 2021, Sims posted 21 points and 14 rebounds in a 91–86 win over Oklahoma State at the Big 12 tournament title game. He averaged 9.2 points, 7.2 rebounds and 1.1 blocks per game as a senior, receiving All-Big 12 Honorable Mention. Following the season, he declared for the 2021 NBA draft while maintaining his college eligibility. He later signed with Klutch Sports, forgoing his remaining eligibility.

== Professional career ==
=== New York Knicks (2021–2025) ===
Sims was selected in the second round of the 2021 NBA draft with the 58th pick by the New York Knicks. On August 8, 2021, he signed a two-way contract with New York, splitting time with their G League affiliate, the Westchester Knicks. On July 9, 2022, Sims signed a three-year, partially guaranteed contract with the Knicks.

In February 2023, Sims was selected to replace Portland Trail Blazers rookie Shaedon Sharpe in the Slam Dunk Contest at the 2023 NBA All-Star Game. Sims did not make it past the first round.

=== Milwaukee Bucks (2025–present) ===
On February 6, 2025, Sims was traded to the Milwaukee Bucks as part of a multi-team trade. He made 14 appearances for the Bucks, averaging 2.4 points, 4.9 rebounds, and 0.8 assists. On March 17, Sims was ruled out for the remainder of the regular season after undergoing surgery to repair a torn ligament in his right thumb.

On July 1, 2025, Sims re-signed with the Bucks on a two-year contract. On April 8, 2026, Sims recorded his first career triple-double, logging 11 points, 11 rebounds, and 10 assists in a 111–137 loss to the Detroit Pistons. He made 67 appearances (including 19 starts) for Milwaukee during the 2025–26 season, recording averages of 5.0 points, 5.5 rebounds, and 1.6 assists.

== Career statistics ==
Legend
GP	Games played	GS	Games started	MPG	Minutes per game
FG%	Field goal percentage	3P%	3-point field goal percentage	FT%	Free throw percentage
RPG	Rebounds per game	APG	Assists per game	SPG	Steals per game
BPG	Blocks per game	PPG	Points per game	**Bold**	Career high

=== NBA ===
==== Regular season ====
Year	Team	GP	GS	MPG	FG%	3P%	FT%	RPG	APG	SPG	BPG	PPG
2021–22	New York	41	5	13.5	.722	—	.414	4.1	.5	**.3**	.5	2.2
2022–23	New York	52	16	15.6	.776	.000	**.750**	4.7	.5	**.3**	.5	3.4
2023–24	New York	45	11	13.0	.691	—	.667	3.3	.6	.2	.4	2.0
2024–25	New York	39	5	10.8	.609	—	.615	3.3	.6	.2	.3	1.6
2024–25	Milwaukee	14	0	15.0	.680	—	—	4.9	.8	.1	**.6**	2.4
2025–26	Milwaukee	**67**	**19**	**19.7**	**.784**	—	.620	**5.5**	**1.6**	**.3**	.3	**5.0**
Career		258	56	15.1	.742	.000	.601	4.4	.8	.2	.4	3.1

==== Playoffs ====
Year	Team	GP	GS	MPG	FG%	3P%	FT%	RPG	APG	SPG	BPG	PPG
2024	New York	5	0	5.5	**1.000**	—	**.750**	1.6	.2	**.4**	.2	1.4
2025	Milwaukee	5	0	**11.6**	**1.000**	—	.667	**4.0**	.2	.0	.2	**2.8**
Career		10	0	8.5	1.000	—	.714	2.8	.2	.2	.2	2.1

=== College ===
Year	Team	GP	GS	MPG	FG%	3P%	FT%	RPG	APG	SPG	BPG	PPG
2017–18	Texas	34	11	18.5	.607	.000	.426	3.9	.2	.3	.5	5.0
2018–19	Texas	**35**	16	14.9	.569	–	**.600**	3.6	.2	.2	.5	4.2
2019–20	Texas	24	24	**27.3**	.658	–	.592	**8.2**	**.8**	.4	**1.2**	**9.7**
2020–21	Texas	26	**26**	24.5	**.696**	–	.520	7.2	.7	**.7**	1.1	9.2
Career		119	77	20.5	.639	.000	.524	5.4	.4	.4	.8	6.6

== Personal life ==
Sims' father, Charles, played college basketball for Minnesota before becoming a dentist. Two of his brothers also played NCAA Division I basketball: Ty at Kansas State and Jason at Northern Iowa. Another brother, Dominique, played college football for Minnesota.
