= Barcode (drink) =

American sports drink brand

Drink Barcode
- Industry: Beverage manufacturing
- Founded: 2021; 5 years ago
- Founders: Bar Malik; Kyle Kuzma
- Headquarters: Los Angeles, California, US
- Key people: Bar Malik (co-founder and CEO); Kyle Kuzma (co-founder)
- Products: Barcode drink
- Number of employees: 6
- Website: Website

Barcode is an American brand of sports drinks. Marketed as a plant-based fitness water, Barcode is the eponymous product of the Drink Barcode company which was co-founded in 2021 by athletic trainer Mubarak "Bar" Malik and basketball player Kyle Kuzma. Its key ingredients include magnesium.

== Background and history ==
Barcode was launched in April 2021 by Mubarak "Bar" Malik and Kyle Kuzma. At the time, Kuzma was on the Los Angeles Lakers, while Malik previously worked with the New York Knicks of the National Basketball Association (NBA) from 2013 to 2020. After time with the team as a training camp assistant and later a strength and conditioning coordinator, he was their Director of Performance.

Malik's work on Barcode was rooted in his experiences during years prior to launching the brand. Due to health issues in his family, such as diabetes, Malik was averse to the sugar content in "big name sports drinks on the market". Having a background in exercise physiology, kinesiology, sports science, and nutrition, Malik began formulating his own beverages. He initially tested these formulas on New England Patriots players as he had a relationship with the team's dietician. He paused work on the formula due to his role with the Knicks, but would revisit the endeavor after training for a marathon, still unhappy with sports drinks dominating the market. Additionally, his mother was diagnosed with cancer and Malik observed what she was receiving as treatment, which included ginseng and other adaptogens. Writing for Forbes, Kristi Dosh quoted Malik stating "why is it we don't have the same type of product at a smaller level—a nontoxic level—to stimulate enough of the antiviral, the anti-inflammatory, the antioxidant chemistry so we can continue to improve our strength?"

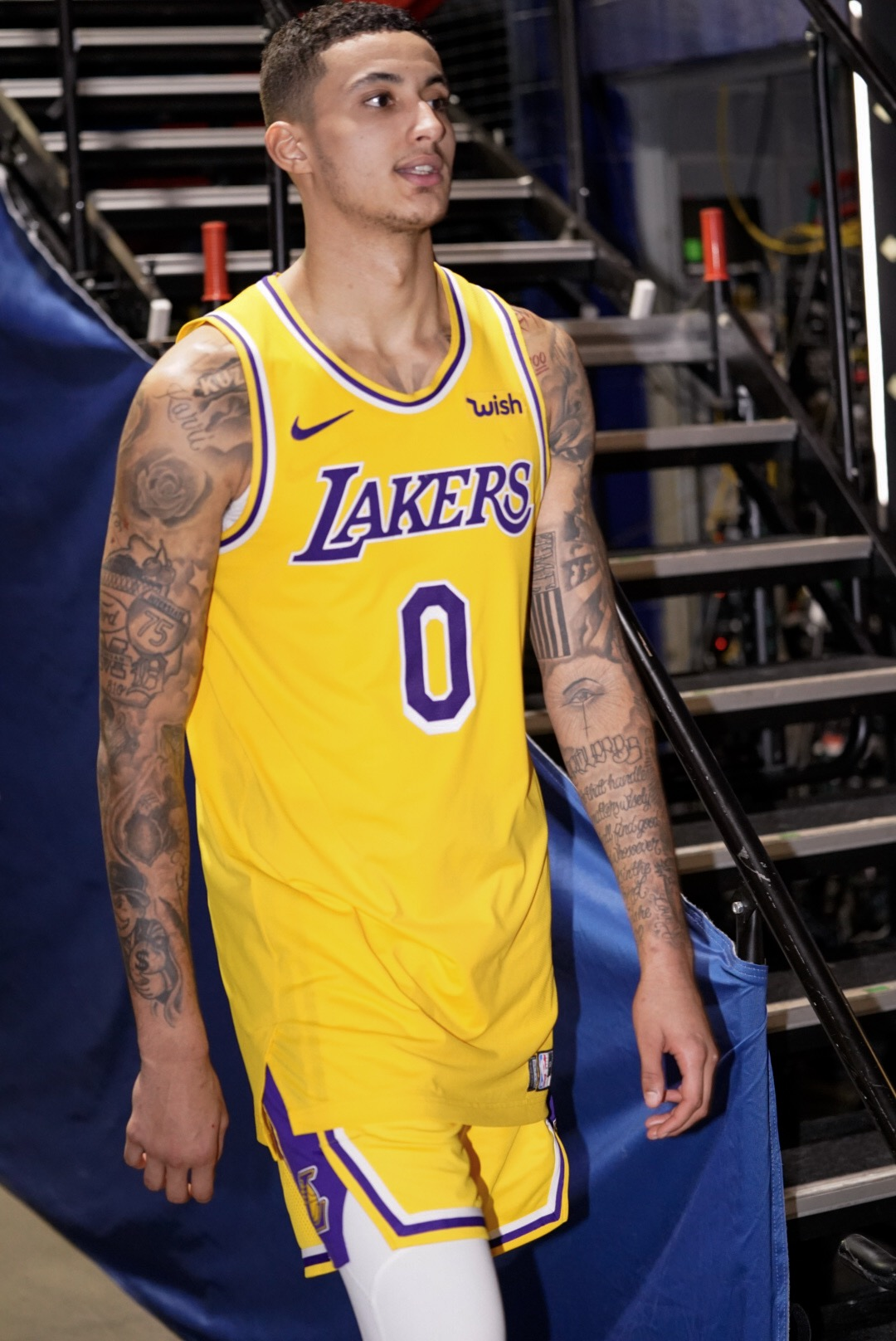
Kyle Kuzma (pictured) co-founded Drink Barcode during his time with the Lakers

In 2020, Malik met Kuzma through a mutual business partner. Kuzma's Lakers were in the midst of a championship run when Malik gave him a drink to test during the 2020 NBA Finals, which the Lakers would win. Soon after, the two opted to become business partners and would co-found the company Drink Barcode, with the Barcode drink itself being its product and Malik as CEO. The company raised $5 million in funding. Headquartered in Los Angeles, Drink Barcode had six full-time employees by May 2021. Barcode launched with two flavors: watermelon and lemon lime. The brand has since expanded to include concord grape, black cherry, and Malibu punch as flavors. Initially, the drink was only available through an official website, though became physically available for purchase at six Erewhon locations in Los Angeles in June 2021. The brand's products were later made available at grocery and convenience stores such as H-E-B, Krogers, Safeway, Albertsons, Buc-ee's and 7-Eleven.

In July 2023, the NBA's then most recent first-overall pick, San Antonio Spurs center Victor Wembanyama, became a brand ambassador for Barcode. Other public figures to have openly praised the product include Halle Berry, Kelly Rowland, and Derrick Rose. Wembanyama featured in the brand's first major ad campaign, launched in late 2023. In October, Barcode signed a three-year sponsorship deal with the NBA's Brooklyn Nets to become the team's "hydration partner".

== Ingredients and packaging ==
The drink is a mainly a combination of coconut water, regular water, vitamin D, magnesium, and adaptogens. Marketed as "fitness water" and a "plant-based performance drink", Barcode beverages include minerals, vitamins, and adaptogens. The drink includes magnesium, as well as vitamins B_{6}, B_{12}, and D; it also features ashwagandha and shiitake mushroom extract, the latter being what sources the beverage's vitamin D. Malik chose to include vitamin D as an ingredient because of vitamin D deficiency being common in the United States, particularly among professional basketball players. Containing 30 calories and having a low sugar content (2g), Barcode's drinks are sweetened with monk fruit. Cordyceps fungus extract and rhodiola rosea extract are ingredients of the watermelon and lemon lime flavors, respectively.

The drink is packaged in a bottle and features a QR code that enables consumers to have an augmented reality (AR) experience with the bottle. When scanned, consumers can see curated content including information regarding the drink.
