= Tyler Smith (basketball, born 2004) =

American basketball player (born 2004)

No. 21 – Rio Grande Valley Vipers
- Position: Power forward
- League: NBA G League

Personal information
- Born: November 2, 2004 (age 22) New Orleans, Louisiana, U.S.
- Listed height: 6 ft 9 in (2.06 m)
- Listed weight: 224 lb (102 kg)

Career information
- High school: George Bush (Richmond, Texas)
- NBA draft: 2024: 2nd round, 33rd overall pick
- Drafted by: Milwaukee Bucks
- Playing career: 2021–present

Career history
- 2021–2022: Team Elite
- 2022–2023: Cold Hearts
- 2023–2024: NBA G League Ignite
- 2024–2025: Milwaukee Bucks
- 2024–2025: →Wisconsin Herd
- 2025: Capital City Go-Go
- 2025–2026: Rio Grande Valley Vipers
- 2026: Dallas Mavericks
- 2026: →Texas Legends
- 2026–present: Rio Grande Valley Vipers

Career highlights
- NBA Cup champion (2024); NBA G League Next Up Game (2024); All-OTE Second Team (2023)
- Stats at NBA.com
- Stats at Basketball Reference

Tyler Smith (born November 2, 2004) is an American professional basketball player for the Rio Grande Valley Vipers of the NBA G League. He has previously played for the Milwaukee Bucks.

== Early life and high school career ==
Smith was born in New Orleans, Louisiana and relocated with his family to Houston, Texas after they were was displaced by Hurricane Katrina in 2005. Smith attended George Bush High School.

Smith was a five-star recruit and one of the top players in the 2023 class, ranked 8th by ESPN, 15th by 247 and 18th by Rivals before leaving school for OTE according to major recruiting services. He had scholarship offers from Kansas, Baylor, Texas, Florida State, Oklahoma, Memphis, and LSU, among others.

== Professional career ==
Smith opted not to pursue a collegiate career and signed a two-year contract with Overtime Elite (OTE), a new professional league based in Atlanta with players between ages 16 and 20, on August 22, 2021. In his second season, he played for team Cold Hearts and was named second team All-OTE after averaging 15.7 points, eight rebounds, 1.9 steals, and 1.3 blocks per game.

Smith signed with the NBA G League Ignite on June 30, 2023.

Smith was selected with the 33rd overall pick by the Milwaukee Bucks in the 2024 NBA draft and on July 5, he signed with them. Smith made his NBA debut on October 23, in a 124–109 win over the Philadelphia 76ers. On December 17, Smith won his first NBA honours playing the final minutes in the 2024 NBA Cup final in a 97-81 win against the Oklahoma City Thunder. Throughout his rookie season, he was assigned several times to the Wisconsin Herd. Smith made 23 appearances for Milwaukee during the 2024–25 NBA season, averaging 2.9 points, 1.1 rebounds, and 0.2 assists.

Smith was waived by Milwaukee on October 20, 2025, after losing a training camp roster battle to Amir Coffey.

On October 25, 2025, Smith was selected second overall by the Osceola Magic in the 2025 NBA G League draft.

On December 3, 2025, Smith signed a two-way contract with the Houston Rockets. Smith was waived on January 3, 2026 without playing in a game for the Rockets.

On March 1, 2026, Smith signed a two-way contract with the Dallas Mavericks. On July 20, Smith was waived by the Mavericks after making 12 appearances for the team, having averaged 4.7 points, 2.8 rebounds, and 0.4 assists.

== Career statistics ==
Legend
GP	Games played	GS	Games started	MPG	Minutes per game
FG%	Field goal percentage	3P%	3-point field goal percentage	FT%	Free throw percentage
RPG	Rebounds per game	APG	Assists per game	SPG	Steals per game
BPG	Blocks per game	PPG	Points per game	**Bold**	Career high

=== NBA ===
Year	Team	GP	GS	MPG	FG%	3P%	FT%	RPG	APG	SPG	BPG	PPG
2024–25	Milwaukee	**23**	0	5.3	**.480**	**.433**	**.750**	1.1	.2	.1	**.2**	2.9
2025–26	Dallas	12	0	**13.8**	.420	.286	.667	**2.8**	**.4**	**.5**	.0	**4.7**
Career		35	0	8.2	.450	.354	.714	1.7	.3	.3	.1	3.5
