= Spencer Rivers =

American basketball coach

Milwaukee Bucks
- Position: Assistant coach
- League: NBA

Career information
- College: University of California, Irvine

Career history

Coaching
- 2023-2024: Detroit Pistons (assistant)
- 2024-present: Milwaukee Bucks (assistant)

Career highlights
- NBA Cup champion (2024)

Spencer Rivers is an American professional basketball coach who is an assistant coach for the Milwaukee Bucks of the National Basketball Association (NBA).

== Coaching career ==
Rivers began his NBA coaching career in 2023 as an assistant coach with the Detroit Pistons under head coach Monty Williams.

In 2024, Rivers was hired as an assistant coach for the Milwaukee Bucks under head coach Doc Rivers.

== Personal life ==
Rivers is the son of NBA head coach Doc Rivers, he is the brother of NBA player Austin Rivers.
