= Jack Herum =

American basketball player and coach

Milwaukee Bucks
- Title: Assistant coach
- League: NBA

Personal information
- Born: River Falls, Wisconsin, U.S.
- Listed height: 6 ft 5 in (1.96 m)
- Listed weight: 195 lb (88 kg)

Career information
- High school: River Falls (River Falls, Wisconsin)
- College: Wisconsin–Whitewater (2012–2014); Wisconsin–River Falls (2014–2016)
- NBA draft: 2016: undrafted
- Position: Forward
- Coaching career: 2016–present

Career history

Coaching
- 2016–2018: Minnesota Duluth (GA)
- 2018–2019: IMG Academy (assistant)
- 2019–2020: Wisconsin Herd (player development coach)
- 2020–2024: Milwaukee Bucks (player development coach)
- 2024–present: Milwaukee Bucks (assistant)

Career highlights
- As player: NCAA DIII champion (2014); As assistant coach: NBA Cup champion (2024); NBA champion (2021)

Jack Herum is an American professional basketball coach who is an assistant coach for the Milwaukee Bucks of the National Basketball Association (NBA).

== Early life and playing career ==
A native of River Falls, Wisconsin, Herum attended River Falls High School, where he excelled in football, baseball, and basketball. He went on to play college basketball at the University of Wisconsin–Whitewater, helping the Warhawks win the 2014 NCAA Division III tournament. Herum transferred to the University of Wisconsin-River Falls (UWRF), where he played 54 games in two seasons for the Falcons as a two-time team captain. As a senior, he averaged 6.4 points and 5.1 rebounds per game. Herum earned his bachelor's degree in exercise sport science from UWRF.

== Coaching career ==
After his playing career, Herum began his coaching career in 2016 as a graduate assistant at the University of Minnesota-Duluth, where he completed his master's in education in 2018. Ahead of his third season with the team in 2018–19, he was promoted to director of basketball operations.

Herum began his NBA coaching career in 2019 as a player development coach for the Wisconsin Herd under head coach Chase Buford.

In 2020, Herum was hired as a player development coach for the Milwaukee Bucks. Herum held the position under head coaches Mike Budenholzer, Adrian Griffin, and Doc Rivers.

As a player development coach with the Bucks, Herum was a part of the 2020-21 Milwaukee Bucks team that won the 2021 NBA championship.

On July 8, 2024, the Bucks announced that Herum had been promoted to assistant coach and head of player development under head coach Doc Rivers.

On August 7, 2026, the Bucks announced that Herum would remain on the Milwaukee coaching staff in an assistant coach/player development role under new head coach Taylor Jenkins.
