= Pete Dominguez =

American basketball player and coach

Paris Basketball
- Position: Assistant coach
- League: LNB Elite; Euroleague

Personal information
- Born: July 15, 1988 (age 38) La Canada, California, U.S.

Career information
- College: San Francisco State University
- Coaching career: 2018–present

Career history

Coaching
- 2018–2020: Los Angeles Clippers (head video coordinator)
- 2020–2023: Philadelphia 76ers (coaching associate)
- 2023–2024: Obras Sanitarias
- 2024–2026: Milwaukee Bucks (assistant)
- 2025–present: Armenia national team (assistant)
- 2026-present: Paris Basketball (assistant)

Career highlights
- As assistant coach: NBA Cup champion (2024)

Peter Christopher Dominguez (born July 15, 1988) is an American professional basketball coach who is an assistant coach for Paris Basketball.

== Coaching career ==
Dominguez began his NBA coaching career in 2018 as a video coordinator for the Los Angeles Clippers under head coach Doc Rivers.

In 2020, Dominguez joined the Philadelphia 76ers as a coaching associate, reuniting with head coach Doc Rivers.

In July 2023, Dominguez was named head coach of Obras Sanitarias of the Argentine National Basketball League, before leaving to join the Bucks of the NBA mid-way through the 2023-24 season.

In February 2024, the Milwaukee Bucks added Dominguez as an assistant coach under head coach Doc Rivers midway through the 2023-24 season.

After the hiring of new Bucks head coach Taylor Jenkins, Dominguez was not named to the Bucks coaching staff for the 2026-27 season. On September 3, 2026, Dominguez was announced as an assistant coach for Paris Basketball under head coach Maxime Lefèvre.

Dominguez also serves as a lead assistant coach for the Armenia men's national basketball team under head coach Rex Kalamian.

== Personal life ==
Dominguez is a graduate of San Francisco State University.
