= Bentley High School (Burton, Michigan) =

Coordinates: 43.023°N 83.5917°W

Location
- 1150 North Belsay Road; Burton, Michigan 48509; United States

Information
- Type: Public high school
- School district: Bentley Community Schools
- Principal: Justin Dickerson
- Staff: 14.00 (FTE)
- Grades: 9–12
- Enrollment: 235 (2023–2024)
- Student to teacher ratio: 16.79
- Colors: Red and white
- Team name: Bulldogs
- Website: https://www.bentleyschools.org/o/bhs

Bentley High School is located in Burton, Michigan. Serving students from the 9th grade to the 12th grade, it is part of the Bentley Community Schools. The high school offers programs in band, music, drama, and sports (with a team name of "the Bentley Bulldogs"), as well as other programs.
