= 2024–25 Indiana Pacers season =

2024–25 NBA season by team

- Conference champions
- Head coach: Rick Carlisle
- President: Kevin Pritchard
- General manager: Chad Buchanan
- Owner: Herbert Simon
- Arena: Gainbridge Fieldhouse

Results
- Record: 50–32 (.610)
- Place: Division: 2nd (Central); Conference: 4th (Eastern)
- Playoff finish: NBA Finals (lost to Thunder 3–4)
- Stats at Basketball Reference

Local media
- Television: FanDuel Sports Network Indiana; WTHR (5 simulcasts)
- Radio: 1070 The Fan

The 2024–25 Indiana Pacers season was the 58th season of the franchise and the 49th season in the National Basketball Association (NBA). Rick Carlisle returned for his eighth season as head coach. The Pacers sought to build off their previous playoff success by advancing to the NBA Finals for the first time since the 1999–2000 season.

During free agency, the Pacers re-signed Pascal Siakam to a four-year, $189.5 million contract. The team lost free agent backup centers Jalen Smith to the Chicago Bulls and Oscar Tshiebwe to the Utah Jazz, while also losing James Wiseman and Isaiah Jackson to season-ending achilles ruptures.

On April 1, 2025, the Pacers clinched their second consecutive playoff berth in the 2025 NBA playoffs following the Portland Trail Blazers victory over the Atlanta Hawks. On April 10, the Pacers clinched the fourth seed in the playoffs following a 114–112 win over the Cleveland Cavaliers and recorded their first 50-win season since 2013–14 with a 126–118 win over the Cavaliers on April 13.

In the first round, the Pacers defeated the Milwaukee Bucks in five games, advancing to face the top-seeded Cleveland Cavaliers in the conference semifinals; the Pacers eliminated Cleveland in five games, advancing to a second straight Eastern Conference finals. This was the first time since the 2013–14 NBA season that the Pacers have advanced to consecutive conference finals, and their 10th NBA conference finals appearance overall. Facing the New York Knicks for the ninth time in their history, Indiana won the series in six games to advance to the NBA Finals for the second time in franchise history, matching up with the 68-win Oklahoma City Thunder, where they lost in seven games. In the decisive Game 7 of the Finals, star point guard Tyrese Haliburton tore his Achilles tendon in the first quarter, and he missed the entirety of the following season.

The 2024–25 Pacers were well known for their unexpected comebacks throughout the playoffs, such as Game 5 against the Bucks, Game 2 against the Cavaliers, Game 1 against the Knicks, and Game 1 of the Finals against the Thunder. Due to their comebacks, the level of competition they had to face, such as both #1 seeds, the Cavaliers and Thunder, and Haliburton's astounding clutch performance throughout the playoffs, such as three game-winners vs. Milwaukee, Cleveland, and Oklahoma City, and a game-tying shot vs. New York, the Pacers were widely considered to have one of the most improbable playoff runs in NBA history.

== Draft ==
Round	Pick	Player	Position(s)	Nationality	College / club
2	36	Juan Núñez	PG	Spain	Ratiopharm Ulm (Germany)
2	49	Tristen Newton	PG	United States	UConn
2	50	Enrique Freeman	PF	United States	Akron

The Pacers entered the draft (which was two days instead of one like it had been since the NBA draft was shortened down to two rounds back in 1989) with three second-round picks, acquired in deals surrounding Victor Oladipo, Buddy Hield, and Pascal Siakam. They had traded their original first-round selection to the Toronto Raptors as part of the Siakam trade and their original second-round selection to the Milwaukee Bucks before it was eventually used by the Los Angeles Clippers in the draft.

On the second day of the draft, the Pacers traded Spanish point guard Juan Núñez, the 36th pick and cash considerations to the San Antonio Spurs in exchange for the 35th pick, Johnny Furphy. They would also select point guard Tristen Newton and Enrique Freeman from the NCAA champion University of Connecticut and University of Akron, respectively, as the back-to-back 49th and 50th picks of the draft.

== Roster ==
2024–25 Indiana Pacers roster
Players

Pos.	No.	Player	Height	Weight	DOB	From
C	13	Tony Bradley	6 ft 10 in (2.08 m)	245 lb (111 kg)	1998-01-08	North Carolina
C	3	Thomas Bryant	6 ft 10 in (2.08 m)	248 lb (112 kg)	1997-07-31	Indiana
G	10	RayJ Dennis (TW)	6 ft 2 in (1.88 m)	180 lb (82 kg)	2001-03-30	Baylor
F	8	Enrique Freeman (TW)	6 ft 7 in (2.01 m)	206 lb (93 kg)	2000-07-29	Akron
G/F	12	Johnny Furphy	6 ft 9 in (2.06 m)	200 lb (91 kg)	2004-12-08	Kansas
G	0	Tyrese Haliburton	6 ft 5 in (1.96 m)	185 lb (84 kg)	2000-02-29	Iowa State
F	22	Isaiah Jackson (injured)	6 ft 9 in (2.06 m)	205 lb (93 kg)	2002-01-10	Kentucky
G	29	Quenton Jackson (TW)	6 ft 5 in (1.96 m)	173 lb (78 kg)	1998-09-15	Texas A&M
F	16	James Johnson	6 ft 7 in (2.01 m)	240 lb (109 kg)	1987-02-20	Wake Forest
G/F	00	Bennedict Mathurin	6 ft 5 in (1.96 m)	210 lb (95 kg)	2002-06-19	Arizona
G	9	T. J. McConnell	6 ft 1 in (1.85 m)	190 lb (86 kg)	1992-03-25	Arizona
G	2	Andrew Nembhard	6 ft 4 in (1.93 m)	191 lb (87 kg)	2000-01-16	Gonzaga
G/F	23	Aaron Nesmith	6 ft 6 in (1.98 m)	215 lb (98 kg)	1999-10-16	Vanderbilt
G	26	Ben Sheppard	6 ft 6 in (1.98 m)	190 lb (86 kg)	2001-07-16	Belmont
F	43	Pascal Siakam	6 ft 8 in (2.03 m)	245 lb (111 kg)	1994-04-02	New Mexico State
F	1	Obi Toppin	6 ft 9 in (2.06 m)	220 lb (100 kg)	1998-03-04	Dayton
C	33	Myles Turner	6 ft 11 in (2.11 m)	250 lb (113 kg)	1996-03-24	Texas
F	5	Jarace Walker	6 ft 7 in (2.01 m)	235 lb (107 kg)	2003-09-04	Houston

Coaches
Head coach
- Rick Carlisle
Assistant(s)
- Maurice Baker
- Jenny Boucek
- Jim Boylen
- Jannero Pargo
- Lloyd Pierce
- Mike Weinar
- Isaac Yacob

Legend
- (DP) Unsigned draft pick
- (FA) Free agent
- (S) Suspended
- (GL) On assignment to G League affiliate
- (TW) Two-way affiliate player
- Injured

Roster
Updated: March 26, 2025

== Standings ==
=== Division ===
Central Division	W	L	PCT	GB	Home	Road	Div	GP
c – Cleveland Cavaliers	64	18	.780	–	34‍–‍7	30‍–‍11	12‍–‍4	82
x – Indiana Pacers	50	32	.610	14.0	29‍–‍12	21‍–‍20	10‍–‍6	82
x – Milwaukee Bucks	48	34	.585	16.0	28‍–‍14	20‍–‍20	9‍–‍7	82
x – Detroit Pistons	44	38	.537	20.0	22‍–‍19	22‍–‍19	5‍–‍11	82
pi – Chicago Bulls	39	43	.476	25.0	18‍–‍23	21‍–‍20	4‍–‍12	82

=== Conference ===
Eastern Conference
#	Team	W	L	PCT	GB	GP
1	c – Cleveland Cavaliers *	64	18	.780	–	82
2	y – Boston Celtics *	61	21	.744	3.0	82
3	x – New York Knicks	51	31	.622	13.0	82
4	x – Indiana Pacers	50	32	.610	14.0	82
5	x – Milwaukee Bucks	48	34	.585	16.0	82
6	x – Detroit Pistons	44	38	.537	20.0	82
7	y – Orlando Magic *	41	41	.500	23.0	82
8	pi – Atlanta Hawks	40	42	.488	24.0	82
9	pi – Chicago Bulls	39	43	.476	25.0	82
10	x – Miami Heat	37	45	.451	27.0	82
11	Toronto Raptors	30	52	.366	34.0	82
12	Brooklyn Nets	26	56	.317	38.0	82
13	Philadelphia 76ers	24	58	.293	40.0	82
14	Charlotte Hornets	19	63	.232	45.0	82
15	Washington Wizards	18	64	.220	46.0	82

== Game log ==
=== Preseason ===
During the preseason, the Pacers would play their final games under what was previously named Bally Sports Indiana. Bally Sports would rebrand itself to the FanDuel Sports Network as of October 21, 2024, before the start of the regular season.

2024 preseason game log
Total: 2–2 (Home: 1–1; Road: 1–1)
Preseason: 2–2 (home: 1–1; road: 1–1)

Game	Date	Team	Score	High points	High rebounds	High assists	Location Attendance	Record
1	October 8	@ Atlanta	L 130–131	Pascal Siakam (15)	Cole Swider (6)	Haliburton, Q. Jackson, Siakam (4)	State Farm Arena; 10,378	0–1
2	October 10	@ Cleveland	W 129–117	Bennedict Mathurin (25)	James Wiseman (10)	T. J. McConnell (5)	Rocket Mortgage Fieldhouse; 16,019	1–1
3	October 14	Memphis	L 116–120	Jarace Walker (15)	Freeman, Turner (7)	Newton, Sheppard (5)	Gainbridge Fieldhouse; 11,221	1–2
4	October 17	Charlotte	W 121–116 (OT)	Myles Turner (18)	James Wiseman (6)	Tyrese Haliburton (5)	Gainbridge Fieldhouse; 11,835	2–2

2024–25 preseason schedule

=== Regular season ===
2024–25 game log
Total: 50–32 (Home: 29–12; Road: 21–20)
October: 2–3 (home: 1–1; road: 1–2)

Game	Date	Team	Score	High points	High rebounds	High assists	Location Attendance	Record
1	October 23	@ Detroit	W 115–109	Myles Turner (20)	Myles Turner (9)	Pascal Siakam (9)	Little Caesars Arena; 20,062	1–0
2	October 25	@ New York	L 98–123	Bennedict Mathurin (20)	Myles Turner (7)	Haliburton, McConnell (5)	Madison Square Garden; 19,812	1–1
3	October 27	Philadelphia	L 114–118 (OT)	Tyrese Haliburton (22)	Aaron Nesmith (7)	Andrew Nembhard (8)	Gainbridge Fieldhouse; 17,274	1–2
4	October 28	@ Orlando	L 115–119	Pascal Siakam (26)	Haliburton, I. Jackson, Siakam (9)	Tyrese Haliburton (10)	Kia Center; 18,846	1–3
5	October 30	Boston	W 135–132 (OT)	Bennedict Mathurin (30)	Mathurin, Siakam (11)	Tyrese Haliburton (12)	Gainbridge Fieldhouse; 17,274	2–3

November: 7–8 (home: 6–2; road: 1–6)

Game	Date	Team	Score	High points	High rebounds	High assists	Location Attendance	Record
6	November 1	@ New Orleans	L 118–125	Ben Sheppard (20)	Isaiah Jackson (8)	Tyrese Haliburton (11)	Smoothie King Center; 15,133	2–4
7	November 4	@ Dallas	W 134–127	Myles Turner (30)	Myles Turner (11)	Tyrese Haliburton (12)	American Airlines Center; 19,613	3–4
8	November 6	Orlando	W 118–111	Bennedict Mathurin (20)	Bennedict Mathurin (11)	McConnell, Nembhard (5)	Gainbridge Fieldhouse; 16,218	4–4
9	November 8	@ Charlotte	L 83–103	Pascal Siakam (27)	Myles Turner (10)	Tyrese Haliburton (9)	Spectrum Center; 17,024	4–5
10	November 10	New York	W 132–121	Bennedict Mathurin (38)	Mathurin, Siakam (8)	Tyrese Haliburton (14)	Gainbridge Fieldhouse; 17,274	5–5
11	November 13	@ Orlando	L 90–94	Pascal Siakam (25)	Bennedict Mathurin (12)	Tyrese Haliburton (11)	Kia Center; 17,087	5–6
12	November 15	Miami	L 111–124	Obi Toppin (21)	Jarace Walker (7)	Tyrese Haliburton (8)	Gainbridge Fieldhouse; 17,274	5–7
13	November 17	Miami	W 119–110	Myles Turner (34)	Bennedict Mathurin (12)	Tyrese Haliburton (13)	Gainbridge Fieldhouse; 16,184	6–7
14	November 18	@ Toronto	L 119–130	Bennedict Mathurin (28)	Pascal Siakam (10)	T. J. McConnell (7)	Scotiabank Arena; 19,025	6–8
15	November 20	@ Houston	L 113–130	Quenton Jackson (24)	Myles Turner (9)	Tyrese Haliburton (8)	Toyota Center; 16,087	6–9
16	November 22	@ Milwaukee	L 117–129	Pascal Siakam (25)	Bennedict Mathurin (9)	Tyrese Haliburton (9)	Fiserv Forum; 17,341	6–10
17	November 24	Washington	W 116–103	Pascal Siakam (22)	Myles Turner (9)	Tyrese Haliburton (9)	Gainbridge Fieldhouse; 17,274	7–10
18	November 25	New Orleans	W 114–110	Tyrese Haliburton (34)	Mathurin, Turner (9)	Tyrese Haliburton (13)	Gainbridge Fieldhouse; 16,059	8–10
19	November 27	Portland	W 121–114	Pascal Siakam (29)	Bennedict Mathurin (10)	Tyrese Haliburton (10)	Gainbridge Fieldhouse; 17,274	9–10
20	November 29	Detroit	L 106–130	Pascal Siakam (21)	Myles Turner (10)	Tyrese Haliburton (5)	Gainbridge Fieldhouse; 17,274	9–11

December: 7–7 (home: 1–3; road: 6–4)

Game	Date	Team	Score	High points	High rebounds	High assists	Location Attendance	Record
21	December 1	@ Memphis	L 121–136	Bennedict Mathurin (19)	Bennedict Mathurin (9)	Tyrese Haliburton (7)	FedExForum; 15,901	9–12
22	December 3	@ Toronto	L 111–122	Tyrese Haliburton (30)	Obi Toppin (9)	Tyrese Haliburton (6)	Scotiabank Arena; 17,741	9–13
23	December 4	@ Brooklyn	L 90–99	Tyrese Haliburton (17)	Furphy, Turner (7)	Tyrese Haliburton (8)	Barclays Center; 16,748	9–14
24	December 6	@ Chicago	W 132–123	Tyrese Haliburton (23)	Siakam, Toppin, Turner (7)	Tyrese Haliburton (8)	United Center; 19,544	10–14
25	December 8	Charlotte	L 109–113	T. J. McConnell (30)	Pascal Siakam (11)	Tyrese Haliburton (8)	Gainbridge Fieldhouse; 17,274	10–15
26	December 13	@ Philadelphia	W 121–107	Tyrese Haliburton (32)	Siakam, Toppin (8)	Tyrese Haliburton (11)	Wells Fargo Center; 19,771	11–15
27	December 15	New Orleans	W 119–104	Pascal Siakam (22)	Jarace Walker (9)	Tyrese Haliburton (10)	Gainbridge Fieldhouse; 16,792	12–15
28	December 19	@ Phoenix	W 120–111	Pascal Siakam (25)	Pascal Siakam (18)	Tyrese Haliburton (12)	Footprint Center; 17,071	13–15
29	December 22	@ Sacramento	W 122–95	Pascal Siakam (19)	Pascal Siakam (10)	T. J. McConnell (10)	Golden 1 Center; 17,832	14–15
30	December 23	@ Golden State	W 111–105	Myles Turner (23)	Myles Turner (10)	Tyrese Haliburton (12)	Chase Center; 18,064	15–15
31	December 26	Oklahoma City	L 114–120	Andrew Nembhard (23)	Myles Turner (11)	Tyrese Haliburton (8)	Gainbridge Fieldhouse; 17,274	15–16
32	December 27	@ Boston	L 105–142	Tyrese Haliburton (19)	Pascal Siakiam (9)	Tyrese Haliburton (9)	TD Garden; 19,156	15–17
33	December 29	@ Boston	W 123–114	Tyrese Haliburton (31)	Nembhard, Siakam (8)	Andrew Nembhard (8)	TD Garden; 19,156	16–17
34	December 31	Milwaukee	L 112–120	Bennedict Mathurin (25)	Myles Turner (10)	Tyrese Haliburton (7)	Gainbridge Fieldhouse; 17,274	16–18

January: 10–2 (home: 5–2; road: 5–0)

Game	Date	Team	Score	High points	High rebounds	High assists	Location Attendance	Record
35	January 2	@ Miami	W 128–115	Tyrese Haliburton (33)	Pascal Siakam (11)	Tyrese Haliburton (15)	Kaseya Center; 19,959	17–18
36	January 4	Phoenix	W 126–108	Tyrese Haliburton (27)	Bennedict Mathurin (10)	Tyrese Haliburton (8)	Gainbridge Fieldhouse; 17,274	18–18
37	January 6	@ Brooklyn	W 113–99	Tyrese Haliburton (23)	Pascal Siakam (6)	Tyrese Haliburton (8)	Barclays Center; 16,088	19–18
38	January 8	Chicago	W 129–113	Pascal Siakam (26)	Thomas Bryant (8)	Tyrese Haliburton (13)	Gainbridge Fieldhouse; 16,758	20–18
39	January 10	Golden State	W 108–96	Haliburton, Siakam (25)	Bennedict Mathurin (10)	Tyrese Haliburton (10)	Gainbridge Fieldhouse; 17,274	21–18
40	January 12	@ Cleveland	W 108–93	Andrew Nembhard (19)	Jarace Walker (12)	T. J. McConnell (8)	Rocket Mortgage FieldHouse; 19,432	22–18
41	January 14	Cleveland	L 117–127	Pascal Siakam (23)	Pascal Siakam (7)	Andrew Nembhard (9)	Gainbridge Fieldhouse; 16,035	22–19
42	January 16	@ Detroit	W 111–100	Myles Turner (28)	Pascal Siakam (7)	Tyrese Haliburton (8)	Little Caesars Arena; 16,366	23–19
43	January 18	Philadelphia	W 115–102	Pascal Siakam (21)	Myles Turner (11)	Tyrese Haliburton (9)	Gainbridge Fieldhouse; 17,274	24–19
44	January 23	San Antonio	L 110–140	Bennedict Mathurin (24)	Siakam, Nembhard (4)	Andrew Nembhard (8)	(France) Accor Arena; 15,935	24–20
45	January 25	@ San Antonio	W 136–98	Tyrese Haliburton (28)	Pascal Siakam (11)	Andrew Nembhard (9)	(France) Accor Arena; 15,979	25–20
46	January 29	Detroit	W 133–119	Pascal Siakam (37)	Haliburton, Turner (7)	Tyrese Haliburton (8)	Gainbridge Fieldhouse; 16,275	26–20

February: 7–5 (home: 4–2; road: 3–3)

Game	Date	Team	Score	High points	High rebounds	High assists	Location Attendance	Record
47	February 1	Atlanta	W 132–127	Pascal Siakam (20)	Siakam, Toppin (9)	Tyrese Haliburton (9)	Gainbridge Fieldhouse; 17,274	27–20
48	February 3	@ Utah	W 112–111	Pascal Siakam (22)	Aaron Nesmith (7)	Andrew Nembhard (8)	Delta Center; 18,175	28–20
49	February 4	@ Portland	L 89–112	Andrew Nembhard (17)	Bennedict Mathurin (7)	Tyrese Haliburton (6)	Moda Center; 16,005	28–21
50	February 6	@ L.A. Clippers	W 119–112	Pascal Siakam (33)	Pascal Siakam (11)	Tyrese Haliburton (8)	Intuit Dome; 13,458	29–21
51	February 8	@ L.A. Lakers	L 117–124	Pascal Siakam (23)	Thomas Bryant (8)	Tyrese Haliburton (9)	Crypto.com Arena; 18,997	29–22
52	February 11	New York	L 115–128	Pascal Siakam (24)	Thomas Bryant (9)	Tyrese Haliburton (8)	Gainbridge Fieldhouse; 16,685	29–23
53	February 12	@ Washington	W 134–130 (OT)	Obi Toppin (31)	Thomas Bryant (11)	T. J. McConnell (9)	Capital One Arena; 11,457	30–23
All-Star Game
54	February 20	Memphis	W 127–113	Tyrese Haliburton (22)	Myles Turner (10)	Tyrese Haliburton (9)	Gainbridge Fieldhouse; 17,274	31–23
55	February 23	L.A. Clippers	W 129–111	Tyrese Haliburton (29)	Pascal Siakam (12)	Tyrese Haliburton (12)	Gainbridge Fieldhouse; 16,950	32–23
56	February 24	Denver	L 116–125	Myles Turner (23)	Pascal Siakam (9)	Tyrese Haliburton (15)	Gainbridge Fieldhouse; 16,549	32–24
57	February 26	Toronto	W 111–91	Tyrese Haliburton (33)	Myles Turner (10)	Tyrese Haliburton (11)	Gainbridge Fieldhouse; 16,596	33–24
58	February 28	@ Miami	L 120–125	Pascal Siakam (36)	Nesmith, Siakam (6)	Andrew Nembhard (11)	Kaseya Center; 19,850	33–25

March: 11–6 (home: 8–1; road: 3–5)

Game	Date	Team	Score	High points	High rebounds	High assists	Location Attendance	Record
59	March 2	Chicago	W 127–112	Aaron Nesmith (27)	Siakam, Turner (6)	Tyrese Haliburton (12)	Gainbridge Fieldhouse; 17,028	34–25
60	March 4	Houston	W 115–102	Tyrese Haliburton (28)	Andrew Nembhard (6)	Tyrese Haliburton (15)	Gainbridge Fieldhouse; 15,513	35–25
61	March 6	@ Atlanta	L 118–124	Pascal Siakam (35)	Siakam, Turner (9)	Andrew Nembhard (10)	State Farm Arena; 15,656	35–26
62	March 8	@ Atlanta	L 118–120	Bennedict Mathurin (30)	Bennedict Mathurin (8)	Andrew Nembhard (12)	State Farm Arena; 17,057	35–27
63	March 10	@ Chicago	L 103–121	Myles Turner (15)	Johnny Furphy (8)	Quenton Jackson (5)	United Center; 20,697	35–28
64	March 11	Milwaukee	W 115–114	Pascal Siakam (25)	Pascal Siakam (12)	Tyrese Haliburton (10)	Gainbridge Fieldhouse; 15,008	36–28
65	March 14	@ Philadelphia	W 112–100	Pascal Siakam (27)	Obi Toppin (8)	Tyrese Haliburton (10)	Wells Fargo Center; 19,758	37–28
66	March 15	@ Milwaukee	L 119–126	Aaron Nesmith (30)	Pascal Siakam (7)	Tyrese Haliburton (15)	Fiserv Forum; 17,729	37–29
67	March 17	@ Minnesota	W 132–130 (OT)	Obi Toppin (34)	Obi Toppin (10)	T. J. McConnell (13)	Target Center; 17,955	38–29
68	March 19	Dallas	W 135–131	Pascal Siakam (29)	Bennedict Mathurin (7)	McConnell, Nembhard (8)	Gainbridge Fieldhouse; 15,078	39–29
69	March 20	Brooklyn	W 105–99 (OT)	Bennedict Mathurin (28)	Bennedict Mathurin (16)	Pascal Siakam (5)	Gainbridge Fieldhouse; 15,008	40–29
70	March 22	Brooklyn	W 108–103	Pascal Siakam (26)	Turner, Haliburton (8)	Tyrese Haliburton (12)	Gainbridge Fieldhouse; 17,274	41–29
71	March 24	Minnesota	W 119–103	Tyrese Haliburton (24)	Myles Turner (9)	Tyrese Haliburton (11)	Gainbridge Fieldhouse; 17,274	42–29
72	March 26	L.A. Lakers	L 119–120	Bennedict Mathurin (23)	Myles Turner (12)	Tyrese Haliburton (18)	Gainbridge Fieldhouse; 17,274	42–30
73	March 27	@ Washington	W 162–109	Tyrese Haliburton (29)	T. J. McConnell (9)	McConnell, Nembhard (8)	Capital One Arena; 15,393	43–30
74	March 29	@ Oklahoma City	L 111–132	Tyrese Haliburton (18)	Pascal Siakam (9)	Andrew Nembhard (7)	Paycom Center; 18,203	43–31
75	March 31	Sacramento	W 111–109	Aaron Nesmith (24)	Bryant, Toppin, Nembhard (7)	Tyrese Haliburton (11)	Gainbridge Fieldhouse; 16,341	44–31

April: 6–1 (home: 4–1; road: 2–0)

Game	Date	Team	Score	High points	High rebounds	High assists	Location Attendance	Record
76	April 2	Charlotte	W 119–105	Tyrese Haliburton (22)	Myles Turner (9)	Tyrese Haliburton (10)	Gainbridge Fieldhouse; 16,042	45–31
77	April 4	Utah	W 140–112	Myles Turner (26)	Turner, Walker (7)	Tyrese Haliburton (11)	Gainbridge Fieldhouse; 17,274	46–31
78	April 6	@ Denver	W 125–120	Myles Turner (24)	Nesmith, Walker (6)	Tyrese Haliburton (14)	Ball Arena; 19,932	47–31
79	April 8	Washington	W 104–98	Pascal Siakam (24)	Myles Turner (11)	Tyrese Haliburton (6)	Gainbridge Fieldhouse; 16,144	48–31
80	April 10	Cleveland	W 114–112	Tyrese Haliburton (23)	Haliburton, Siakam (8)	Tyrese Haliburton (10)	Gainbridge Fieldhouse; 17,020	49–31
81	April 11	Orlando	L 115–129	Bennedict Mathurin (20)	Tony Bradley (9)	seven players (3)	Gainbridge Fieldhouse; 17,010	49–32
82	April 13	@ Cleveland	W 126–118 (2OT)	Quenton Jackson (21)	Tony Bradley (14)	RayJ Dennis (6)	Rocket Arena; 19,432	50–32

2024–25 season schedule

=== Playoffs ===
2025 playoff game log
Total: 15–8 (home: 8–3; road: 7–5)
First Round: 4–1 (home: 3–0; road: 1–1)

Game	Date	Team	Score	High points	High rebounds	High assists	Location Attendance	Series
1	April 19	Milwaukee	W 117–98	Pascal Siakam (25)	Haliburton, Siakam (7)	Tyrese Haliburton (12)	Gainbridge Fieldhouse; 17,274	1–0
2	April 22	Milwaukee	W 123–115	Pascal Siakam (24)	Pascal Siakam (11)	Tyrese Haliburton (12)	Gainbridge Fieldhouse; 17,274	2–0
3	April 25	@ Milwaukee	L 101–117	Pascal Siakam (28)	Haliburton, Nesmith (7)	Tyrese Haliburton (10)	Fiserv Forum; 17,942	2–1
4	April 27	@ Milwaukee	W 129–103	Myles Turner (23)	Tyrese Haliburton (8)	Tyrese Haliburton (15)	Fiserv Forum; 17,855	3–1
5	April 29	Milwaukee	W 119–118 (OT)	Tyrese Haliburton (26)	Aaron Nesmith (12)	Tyrese Haliburton (9)	Gainbridge Fieldhouse; 17,274	4–1

Conference Semifinals: 4–1 (home: 1–1; road: 3–0)

Game	Date	Team	Score	High points	High rebounds	High assists	Location Attendance	Series
1	May 4	@ Cleveland	W 121–112	Andrew Nembhard (23)	Myles Turner (12)	Tyrese Haliburton (13)	Rocket Arena; 19,432	1–0
2	May 6	@ Cleveland	W 120–119	Nesmith, Turner (23)	Tyrese Haliburton (9)	Andrew Nembhard (13)	Rocket Arena; 19,432	2–0
3	May 9	Cleveland	L 104–126	Bennedict Mathurin (23)	Aaron Nesmith (7)	T. J. McConnell (7)	Gainbridge Fieldhouse; 17,274	2–1
4	May 11	Cleveland	W 129–109	Pascal Siakam (21)	Myles Turner (7)	T. J. McConnell (8)	Gainbridge Fieldhouse; 17,274	3–1
5	May 13	@ Cleveland	W 114–105	Tyrese Haliburton (31)	Aaron Nesmith (13)	Tyrese Haliburton (8)	Rocket Arena; 19,432	4–1

Conference Finals: 4–2 (home: 2–1; road: 2–1)

Game	Date	Team	Score	High points	High rebounds	High assists	Location Attendance	Series
1	May 21	@ New York	W 138–135 (OT)	Tyrese Haliburton (31)	Obi Toppin (10)	Tyrese Haliburton (11)	Madison Square Garden; 19,812	1–0
2	May 23	@ New York	W 114–109	Pascal Siakam (39)	Tyrese Haliburton (8)	Tyrese Haliburton (11)	Madison Square Garden; 19,812	2–0
3	May 25	New York	L 100–106	Tyrese Haliburton (20)	Aaron Nesmith (7)	Tyrese Haliburton (7)	Gainbridge Fieldhouse; 17,274	2–1
4	May 27	New York	W 130–121	Tyrese Haliburton (32)	Tyrese Haliburton (12)	Tyrese Haliburton (15)	Gainbridge Fieldhouse; 17,274	3–1
5	May 29	@ New York	L 94–111	Bennedict Mathurin (23)	Bennedict Mathurin (9)	Tyrese Haliburton (6)	Madison Square Garden; 19,812	3–2
6	May 31	New York	W 125–108	Pascal Siakam (31)	Haliburton, Toppin (6)	Tyrese Haliburton (13)	Gainbridge Fieldhouse; 17,274	4–2

NBA Finals: 3–4 (home: 2–1; road: 1–3)

Game	Date	Team	Score	High points	High rebounds	High assists	Location Attendance	Series
1	June 5	@ Oklahoma City	W 111–110	Pascal Siakam (19)	Aaron Nesmith (12)	Haliburton, Nembhard (6)	Paycom Center; 18,203	1–0
2	June 8	@ Oklahoma City	L 107–123	Tyrese Haliburton (17)	Pascal Siakam (7)	Haliburton, McConnell (6)	Paycom Center; 18,203	1–1
3	June 11	Oklahoma City	W 116–107	Bennedict Mathurin (27)	Tyrese Haliburton (9)	Tyrese Haliburton (11)	Gainbridge Fieldhouse; 17,274	2–1
4	June 13	Oklahoma City	L 104–111	Pascal Siakam (20)	Aaron Nesmith (9)	Tyrese Haliburton (7)	Gainbridge Fieldhouse; 17,274	2–2
5	June 16	@ Oklahoma City	L 109–120	Pascal Siakam (28)	Bennedict Mathurin (8)	Tyrese Haliburton (6)	Paycom Center; 18,203	2–3
6	June 19	Oklahoma City	W 108–91	Obi Toppin (20)	Pascal Siakam (13)	T. J. McConnell (6)	Gainbridge Fieldhouse; 17,274	3–3
7	June 22	@ Oklahoma City	L 91–103	Bennedict Mathurin (24)	Bennedict Mathurin (13)	Andrew Nembhard (6)	Paycom Center; 18,203	3–4

2025 playoff schedule

=== NBA Cup ===
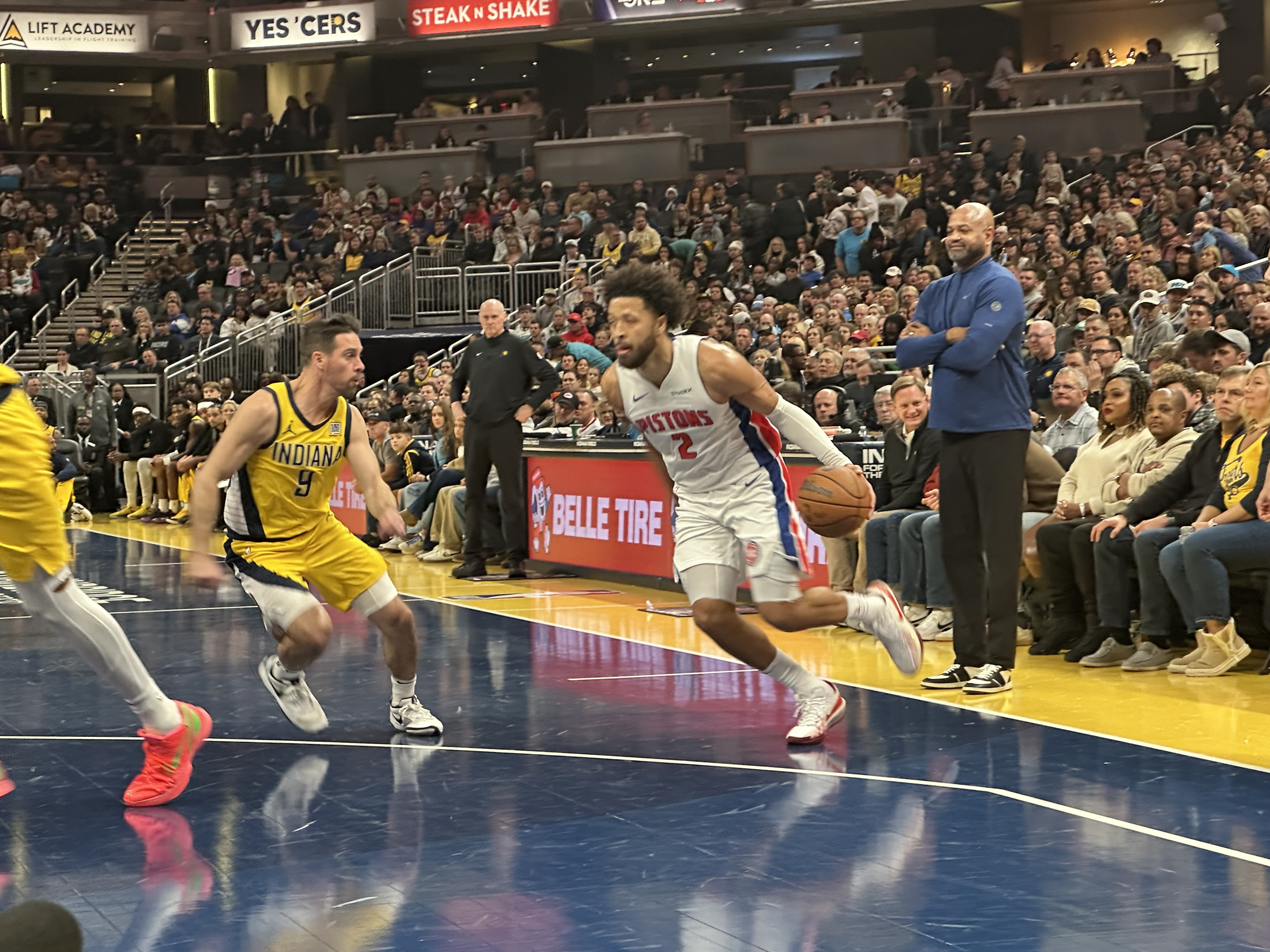
Indiana Pacers vs. Detroit Pistons during 2024 NBA Cup group play

The groups were revealed during the tournament announcement on July 12, 2024.

==== East Group B ====
Pos	Team	Pld	W	L	PF	PA	PD	Qualification
1	Milwaukee Bucks	4	4	0	462	412	+50	Advance to knockout stage
2	Detroit Pistons	4	3	1	447	440	+7	
3	Miami Heat	4	2	2	459	439	+20	
4	Toronto Raptors	4	1	3	413	430	−17	
5	Indiana Pacers	4	0	4	445	505	−60	

Source: NBA
Rules for classification: Tiebreakers

2024–25 game log
Total: 0–4 (Home: 0–2; Road: 0–2)
NBA Cup: 0–4 (home: 0–2; road: 0–2)

Game	Date	Team	Score	High points	High rebounds	High assists	Location Attendance	Record
1	November 15	Miami	L 111–124	Obi Toppin (21)	Jarace Walker (7)	Tyrese Haliburton (8)	Gainbridge Fieldhouse; 17,274	0–1
2	November 22	@ Milwaukee	L 117–129	Pascal Siakam (25)	Bennedict Mathurin (9)	Tyrese Haliburton (9)	Fiserv Forum; 17,341	0–2
3	November 29	Detroit	L 106–130	Pascal Siakam (21)	Myles Turner (10)	Tyrese Haliburton (5)	Gainbridge Fieldhouse; 17,274	0–3
4	December 3	@ Toronto	L 111–122	Tyrese Haliburton (30)	Obi Toppin (9)	Tyrese Haliburton (6)	Scotiabank Arena; 17,741	0–4

== Player statistics ==
=== Regular season ===
Player	POS	GP	GS	MP	REB	AST	STL	BLK	PTS	MPG	RPG	APG	SPG	BPG	PPG
T. J. McConnell	PG	79	1	1,415	193	351	83	21	720	17.9	2.4	4.4	1.1	.3	9.1
Obi Toppin	PF	79	4	1,545	318	128	46	28	833	19.6	4.0	1.6	.6	.4	10.5
Pascal Siakam	PF	78	78	2,548	540	263	70	42	1,578	32.7	6.9	3.4	.9	.5	20.2
Jarace Walker	PF	75	5	1,187	229	110	54	25	461	15.8	3.1	1.5	.7	.3	6.1
Tyrese Haliburton	PG	73	73	2,451	258	673	105	49	1,359	33.6	3.5	9.2	1.4	.7	18.6
Bennedict Mathurin	SF	72	49	2,149	383	136	47	24	1,156	29.8	5.3	1.9	.7	.3	16.1
Myles Turner	C	72	72	2,174	471	111	54	144	1,120	30.2	6.5	1.5	.8	2.0	15.6
Andrew Nembhard	SG	65	65	1,881	216	326	79	11	653	28.9	3.3	5.0	1.2	.2	10.0
Ben Sheppard	SG	63	9	1,228	177	85	38	14	332	19.5	2.8	1.3	.6	.2	5.3
Thomas Bryant^{†}	C	56	8	848	219	49	27	32	388	15.1	3.9	.9	.5	.6	6.9
Johnny Furphy	SG	50	0	379	71	19	18	11	103	7.6	1.4	.4	.4	.2	2.1
Aaron Nesmith	SF	45	37	1,123	178	54	35	17	541	25.0	4.0	1.2	.8	.4	12.0
Quenton Jackson	PG	28	7	381	44	53	21	5	162	13.6	1.6	1.9	.8	.2	5.8
Enrique Freeman	PF	22	1	181	30	9	3	3	46	8.2	1.4	.4	.1	.1	2.1
Tony Bradley	C	14	0	113	42	6	2	9	61	8.1	3.0	.4	.1	.6	4.4
James Johnson	PF	12	0	37	6	4	0	2	8	3.1	.5	.3	.0	.2	.7
RayJ Dennis	PG	11	0	70	12	14	7	2	30	6.4	1.1	1.3	.6	.2	2.7
Moses Brown^{†}	C	9	0	46	13	0	2	1	29	5.1	1.4	.0	.2	.1	3.2
Isaiah Jackson	C	5	1	84	28	5	3	8	35	16.8	5.6	1.0	.6	1.6	7.0
Tristen Newton^{†}	SG	5	0	8	0	1	0	0	3	1.6	.0	.2	.0	.0	.6
Jahlil Okafor	C	1	0	3	1	1	0	0	0	3.0	1.0	1.0	.0	.0	.0
James Wiseman	C	1	0	5	1	0	0	0	6	5.0	1.0	.0	.0	.0	6.0

- ^{†} Denotes player spent time with another team in the season. Stats reflect time with the Pacers only.

=== Playoffs ===
Player	POS	GP	GS	MP	REB	AST	STL	BLK	PTS	MPG	RPG	APG	SPG	BPG	PPG
Tyrese Haliburton	PG	23	23	772	123	197	30	15	399	33.6	5.3	8.6	1.3	.7	17.3
T. J. McConnell	PG	23	0	402	75	93	20	2	218	17.5	3.3	4.0	.9	.1	9.5
Andrew Nembhard	SG	23	23	769	74	107	35	5	287	33.4	3.2	4.7	1.5	.2	12.5
Aaron Nesmith	SF	23	23	650	130	26	20	18	291	28.3	5.7	1.1	.9	.8	12.7
Pascal Siakam	PF	23	23	771	146	78	28	16	472	33.5	6.3	3.4	1.2	.7	20.5
Obi Toppin	PF	23	0	440	88	30	15	8	216	19.1	3.8	1.3	.7	.3	9.4
Myles Turner	C	23	23	675	110	32	12	46	317	29.3	4.8	1.4	.5	2.0	13.8
Bennedict Mathurin	SF	22	0	385	73	19	9	7	243	17.5	3.3	.9	.4	.3	11.0
Ben Sheppard	SG	21	0	293	39	8	8	1	67	14.0	1.9	.4	.4	.0	3.2
Thomas Bryant	C	20	0	167	27	4	4	6	52	8.4	1.4	.2	.2	.3	2.6
Jarace Walker	PF	12	0	117	21	8	2	2	36	9.8	1.8	.7	.2	.2	3.0
Tony Bradley	C	11	0	78	21	3	0	1	17	7.1	1.9	.3	.0	.1	1.5
Johnny Furphy	SG	11	0	35	6	1	0	1	2	3.2	.5	.1	.0	.1	.2
James Johnson	PF	5	0	18	1	2	2	2	7	3.6	.2	.4	.4	.4	1.4

== Transactions ==
=== Trades ===
July 6, 2024	To Indiana Pacers Draft rights to Johnny Furphy (No. 35)	To San Antonio Spurs Draft rights to Juan Núñez (No. 36); Cash considerations
December 15, 2024	To Indiana Pacers Thomas Bryant	To Miami Heat 2031 IND second-round pick swap
February 6, 2025	To Indiana Pacers 2026 TOR second-round pick (Top 55 protected)	To Toronto Raptors James Wiseman; Cash considerations

=== Free agency ===
==== Re-signed ====
Player	Signed	Ref.
Obi Toppin	July 6, 2024	
Pascal Siakam	July 8, 2024	
James Johnson	July 25, 2024	
Andrew Nembhard	July 26, 2024	
T.J. McConnell	September 3, 2024	

==== Additions ====
Player	Signed	Former Team	Ref.
Josiah-Jordan James	June 28, 2024 (Exhibit 10)	Tennessee Volunteers	
James Wiseman	July 5, 2024	Detroit Pistons	
Keisei Tominaga	July 5, 2024 (Exhibit 10)	Nebraska Cornhuskers	
Johnny Furphy	July 6, 2024	Kansas Jayhawks	
Tristen Newton	July 27, 2024 (Two-way contract)	UConn Huskies	
Quenton Jackson	July 27, 2024 (Two-way contract)	Indiana Mad Ants	
Enrique Freeman	August 8, 2024 (Two-way contract)	Akron Zips	
Cole Swider	August 8, 2024 (Two-way contract)	Miami Heat	
Jahlil Okafor	October 15, 2024 (Exhibit 10)	Casademont Zaragoza	

==== Subtractions ====
Player	Reason	New Team	Ref.
Jalen Smith	Free agency	Chicago Bulls	
Doug McDermott	Free agency	Sacramento Kings	
Oscar Tshiebwe	Free agency	Utah Jazz	
Isaiah Wong	Free agency	Utah Jazz / Charlotte Hornets	
Jahlil Okafor	Waived	Indiana Mad Ants	
Cole Swider	Waived	Detroit Pistons	
Kendall Brown	Waived	Long Island Nets	
Tristen Newton	Waived	Minnesota Timberwolves	
