= Knicks–Pacers rivalry =

National Basketball Association rivalry

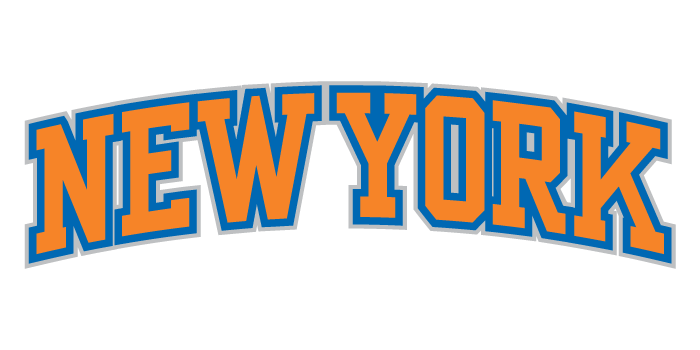
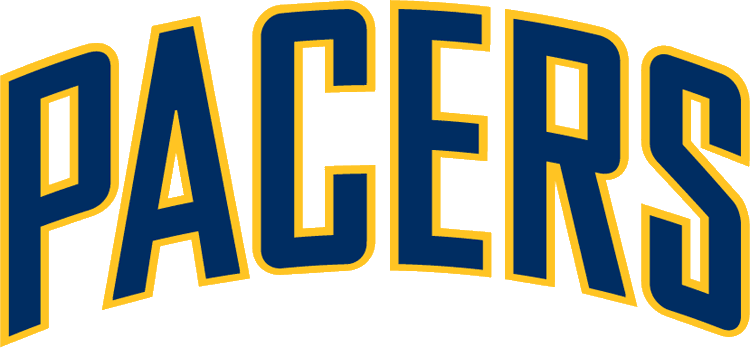
- New York Knicks Indiana Pacers
- First meeting: February 9, 1977; Pacers 110, Knicks 109
- Latest meeting: November 13, 2026; Pacers 106, Knicks 104
- Next meeting: November 22, 2026

Statistics
- Total meetings: 257
- All-time series: 129–128 (NYK)
- Regular season series: 105–98 (NYK)
- Postseason results: 30–24 (IND)
- Longest win streak: NYK W10
- Current win streak: IND W1

Postseason history
- 1993 Eastern Conference First Round: Knicks won, 3–1; 1994 Eastern Conference Finals: Knicks won, 4–3; 1995 Eastern Conference Semifinals: Pacers won, 4–3; 1998 Eastern Conference Semifinals: Pacers won, 4–1; 1999 Eastern Conference Finals: Knicks won, 4–2; 2000 Eastern Conference Finals: Pacers won, 4–2; 2013 Eastern Conference Semifinals: Pacers won, 4–2; 2024 Eastern Conference Semifinals: Pacers won, 4–3; 2025 Eastern Conference Finals: Pacers won, 4–2

The Knicks–Pacers rivalry is a basketball rivalry between the New York Knicks and the Indiana Pacers of the National Basketball Association (NBA). The rivalry started in 1977 and quickly became one of the most bitter in NBA history. They met in the playoffs 6 times from 1993 to 2000, fueling a rivalry epitomized by the enmity between Pacer Reggie Miller and prominent Knick fan Spike Lee. Miller likened it to the Hatfield–McCoy feud, and The New York Times said in 1998 that it was "as combustible as any in the league".

The rivalry gave Miller the nickname "Knick Killer". His clutch performances were frequently followed by jabs at Lee like the choke sign, adding fuel to the rivalry. The rivalry was briefly renewed during the 2013 NBA playoffs in the Eastern Conference Semifinals, with Indiana winning in 6 games. The rivalry was then renewed once again during the 2024 NBA playoffs in the Eastern Conference Semifinals following the Pacers upsetting the Knicks in game 7, and again in the Eastern Conference Finals of the 2025 NBA playoffs.

The rivalry has been referred to as the "Hicks vs. Knicks", arising from the contrasting fanbases and media portrayals of the two teams, with the Pacers often being associated with a "small town" image and the Knicks representing the "big city" of New York City.

== Pre 1990s ==
Since the creation of the Pacers franchise in the ABA in 1967, the Knicks and Pacers have always been indirectly linked together. In the ABA, the Pacers won championships in 1970, 1972, and 1973. Meanwhile, the Knicks won it all in 1970 and 1973, and went to the Finals in 1972. Before each team's 1971 season, the Pacers and Knicks played an exhibition game in September, with the Knicks winning by two at the Indiana State Fairgrounds Coliseum. The game was one of the first ABA vs NBA games ever played.

In the ABA, the Pacers biggest rival was the New York Nets.

The Knicks and Pacers were also at the center of the controversial 1985 draft lottery. The first year the NBA draft lottery was introduced was in 1985. Prior to 1985, the team with the worst record in each conference would participate in a coin flip to determine the first overall pick in the NBA draft. In 1985, the Pacers and Warriors were tied for the worst record in the league, with the Knicks having the third worst record. Some have argued that NBA Commissioner David Stern fixed the first overall pick to help his hometown team, the struggling New York Knicks. The lottery system used in 1985 involved a random drawing of seven envelopes from a hopper, with each of the then-seven non-playoff teams having an equal chance of obtaining the first pick. Inside each of the envelopes was the logo of a non-playoff team. The team whose envelope was drawn first would get the first pick. The process was then repeated until the rest of the first seven lottery picks were determined. In the U.S., CBS had live coverage of Stern pulling the envelopes from the hopper (as opposed to NBA Draft lotteries today where the actual drawing is held behind closed doors before the results are revealed on TV). The "frozen envelope theory" suggests that the National Basketball Association rigged its 1985 draft lottery so that Patrick Ewing would join the New York Knicks. Theorists claim that a lottery envelope was chilled so that it could be identified by touch. The Pacers finished second in the draft lottery and took Wayman Tisdale in the draft.

== 1993 Eastern Conference first round ==
The two teams first met in the first round of the 1993 NBA Playoffs. The Knicks, led by Patrick Ewing, Charles Oakley, John Starks, Doc Rivers, and Coach of the Year Pat Riley had amassed a 60–22 record-the best in the East-and earned the top seed in the East. The Pacers, with Miller, Rik Smits, Detlef Schrempf, and Dale Davis barely squeaked into the playoffs with a 41–41 record, thanks to the tiebreaker over the Magic. The Knicks won the first two games at Madison Square Garden before the Pacers won the first of two at Market Square Arena. Game 3 is remembered as being a precursor for the next decade, as trash-talking between Miller and Starks culminated with Starks headbutting Miller in the 3rd quarter, leading to his ejection. The Knicks, however, took Game 4 and advanced (the playoff format had a best-of-5 first round until 2003) to defeat the Hornets before bowing out to the Bulls. The Pacers fired Bob Hill and hired the nomadic but legendary Larry Brown.

== 1994 Eastern Conference finals ==
The Pacers got their first chance at revenge the following year in the 1994 Eastern Conference Finals. Brown traded Schrempf for Derrick McKey and added rookie forward Antonio Davis, veteran Byron Scott, and journeyman point guard Haywoode Workman. They finished with a 47–35 record and the 5th seed in the East, winning their final 8 games. They swept Orlando and upset the top-seeded Hawks in 6.

Meanwhile, the Knicks, following Michael Jordan's first retirement, were heavily favored to win the East. Rivers was lost for the season with a knee injury in December, but New York acquired Derek Harper from Dallas to replace him. Despite winning the Atlantic Division, they lost the top seed in the East to Atlanta; both teams finished 57–25 and split the season series 2–2, but the Hawks won the tiebreaker. The Knicks beat the Nets in 4, then finally beat Chicago in 7 to reach the Eastern Conference Finals, where Indiana was waiting.

Both teams won their first two home games. However, in Game 5 at New York, Miller scored 39 points (25 in the fourth) in the Pacers' 93–86 victory. Miller hit several long 3's during the quarter while engaging in an animated discussion with Spike Lee, who was seated courtside. After Indiana took a 3–2 series lead with the victory, the New York Daily News ran a cover story with Lee's picture and the sarcastic headline, "Thanks A Lot, Spike". However, Indiana lost the next two games and the series. Ewing scored the decisive points off a put-back dunk in Game 7 with 26.9 seconds left. It capped one of the center's finest postseason performances of his career, as he finished with 24 points, 22 rebounds, 7 assists, and 5 blocks. Miller airballed a last-second 3, and the Knicks closed the series out at the foul line for a 94–90 victory.

== 1995 Eastern Conference semifinals ==
By virtue of the previous year's 7-game series between the two teams, the Knicks and Pacers were now rivals, but the Pacers had yet to answer their foe's last two playoff series wins. The Pacers addressed their need for a point guard by acquiring former Knick Mark Jackson from the Los Angeles Clippers. Indiana also stepped up their game. Smits enjoyed his best NBA season, averaged career highs of 17.9 points and 7.7 rebounds, Miller continued to lead the team with 19.6 points per game with a .415 3-point percentage (15th in the league) and a .897 free throw percentage (4th in the league) and was a starter in the 1995 NBA All-Star Game and member of the All-NBA Third Team. Derrick McKey played both the third scorer, and provider of intangibles, placing third on the team in both scoring and rebounding, second in assists, and first in steals, earning a spot on the NBA All-Defensive Second Team. Winning the first division title and achieving its first 50-win season since joining the NBA from the ABA with a record of 52–30, the second-seed Pacers swept the Hawks in the first round.

After the Knicks made the finals the prior year they had players contribute the following season. Anthony Mason, who was eventually named the 1995 NBA Sixth Man of the Year, averaged 9.9 points and 8.4 rebounds, while Ewing (top 10 in scoring, rebounding, and blocks), and Starks put up (15.3 ppg). Placing 2nd in the Atlantic Division to the Magic with a 55–27 record and the third seed, the Knicks beat the Cavs in 4. With the better record, the Knicks had home-court advantage over the Pacers again.

In Game 1 in New York, it was Miller Time again as he amazingly scored 8 points in 8.9 seconds: a 3-pointer, followed by stealing the inbound pass and another 3 to tie the game and 2 free throws, erasing the Knicks' 105–99 lead and stealing the game 107–105. The stunned Knicks settled for a 2-game split with a 96–77 victory, but the Pacers won the next 2 in Indiana 97–95 and 98–84 to take a 3–1 series lead. The Knicks won Game 5 in the Garden 96–95 on Ewing's game-winner with 1.8 seconds left to stay alive and won Game 6 on the road 92–82 to force Game 7. But the Pacers won in New York 97–95, after Ewing missed a potential game-tying layup as time expired. Pat Riley resigned the day after the 1995 NBA Finals ended, and Don Nelson, who had recently stepped down as the Golden State Warriors head coach, became Riley's successor.

== 1998 Eastern Conference semifinals ==
After a 3-year hiatus, the two teams renewed the rivalry in the 1998 Eastern Conference Semifinals. Unlike the previous 2 meetings, the Pacers were heavy favorites. The Knicks were without Patrick Ewing, who suffered a severely broken wrist early in the regular season. Ewing returned to the lineup in Game 2 but wasn't 100%. The Knicks managed to make the playoffs as the 7th seed in the East. The Knicks upset the 2nd seeded Heat in 5 in their first-round match-up, while the Pacers disposed of the 6th seeded Cavs 3–1.

Indiana won Games 1 and 2 at Market Square Arena. At home in Game 3, the Knicks won 83–76 behind a strong performance by Ewing, who finished with 19 points and 7 rebounds, and a strong defensive effort. Game 4 was a sharp contrast from the first 3 games, as it was a high scoring affair in the Garden that Indiana won 118–107 in OT behind another great performance by Miller, who hit a 3 with 5.1 seconds left to tie it at 102 and force OT. He finished with 38 points. The Pacers also got good performances from Rik Smits (23 points, 8 rebounds), Mark Jackson (16 points, 15 assists), and Chris Mullin (18 points, 5 steals). Indiana clinched the series with a 99–88 win in Game 5 despite a great performance from Knicks guard Allan Houston.

== 1999 Eastern Conference finals ==
In the lockout shortened 1998–99 NBA season, the Knicks had a disappointing regular season, despite having a healthy Ewing and the controversial additions of talented guard Latrell Sprewell and Marcus Camby, who were acquired in trades for crowd favorites Starks and Oakley, respectively. However, New York snuck into the playoffs as the eighth seed with a 27–23 record. The Pacers finished as the second seed in the Eastern Conference with a 33–17 record and were considered by many to be the favorites to win the Eastern Conference with the breakup of the Bulls. The 8th-seeded Knicks were able to knock off 1st seeded Miami for the 2nd year in a row after Allan Houston made the game-winning shot in Game 5 that bounced off the front rim, off the backboard, and in with 0.8 seconds left. This was only the second time in NBA history that a #8 seed beat a #1 seed in the first round. In the Eastern Conference Semifinals, the Knicks stunned the Hawks, sweeping them 4–0. Meanwhile, the Pacers were on a roll in the playoffs, sweeping the Bucks and 76ers.

The Knicks won Game 1 on the road 93–90 behind strong performances from Ewing, Sprewell, Houston, and Larry Johnson. The Pacers settled for a split at Market Square Arena, beating New York 88–86 in Game 2. However, the bigger loss for the Knicks appeared to be the loss of Ewing to an Achilles' tendon injury. He was out for the rest of the playoffs. However, with the series heading back to New York, the Knicks played inspired basketball. New York won Game 3 92–91 behind strong performances from Johnson (26 points, 8 rebounds) and Camby (21 points, 11 rebounds, and 4 steals). It was Johnson's 4-point play, on a foul called on Antonio Davis, that ended up as the game-winner. The Pacers shook off the loss to win Game 4 at Madison Square Garden 90–78 to even the series back up at 2. With the series going back to Indiana for Game 5 without Ewing, New York's Cinderella run appeared to be over. But the Knicks played inspired in Game 5 and won 101–94 at Market Square Arena despite a 30-point performance from Miller, to take a 3–2 lead with a chance to clinch in New York. New York was anchored by strong performances from Sprewell (29 points) and Camby (21 points, 13 rebounds, and 6 blocks). The Knicks suffered yet another blow in Game 6, with Larry Johnson going down with an injury early in the first half. But Allan Houston's 32 points, coupled with one of the worst postseason performances of Miller's career (He scored only 8 points on 3-of-18 shooting), helped New York beat Indiana 90–82 to clinch the series 4–2. With their victory, the Knicks became the first eighth seed to reach the NBA Finals before falling short against the San Antonio Spurs in 5 games.

== 2000 Eastern Conference finals ==
The Pacers finished the regular season 56–26 and clinched the top seed in the Eastern Conference. The Pacers were pushed to the limit in the first round by the Bucks, led by Ray Allen. In the decisive Game 5, Reggie Miller tied his career playoff high by scoring 41 points to win the series. After beating Allen Iverson's 76ers in the second round in six games, the Pacers once again reached the Eastern Conference Finals.

The Knicks, the third seed in the Eastern Conference playoffs, swept the Raptors in three. The Knicks were once again matched up against Miami, and won the series in seven.

The Pacers, having home court advantage throughout the Eastern Conference Playoffs, won the first two games against the Knicks in their first year at the newly constructed Conseco Fieldhouse, now named Gainbridge Fieldhouse. Returning to New York, the Knicks evened up the series at 2 by winning the following 2 at the Garden. The Pacers won the next game at home, and then Game 6 (in what would be Ewing's last game as a Knick) in New York 93–80 behind Reggie Miller's game-high 34 points, (5–7 from downtown). Miller scored 17 in the fourth (3–3 from downtown) as the Pacers advanced to the 2000 NBA Finals for the first time in franchise history. The Pacers would eventually lose to the Los Angeles Lakers in six games led by superstars Kobe Bryant and Shaquille O'Neal.

== 2013 Eastern Conference semifinals ==
The Knicks had major struggles after the Ewing era. They did not win a single playoff series from 2001 to 2012. Meanwhile, the Pacers remained competitive even as Reggie Miller neared retirement, but struggled after he retired, making the playoffs only once between 2005 and 2010.

The Knicks and Pacers rebuilt their teams and returned to the playoffs in 2011. The Knicks were now led by high-scoring Carmelo Anthony, J.R. Smith, Raymond Felton, and Tyson Chandler, while the Pacers, led by Paul George, David West and Roy Hibbert, relied on their trademark defense-first philosophy in returning to the playoffs. It took some time before both teams regained the elite status they enjoyed in the 1990s.

On May 3, 2013, the Knicks beat the Celtics on the road and won the first round series 4–2 while Indiana beat the Hawks on the road to win their series 4–2. The Pacers took Game 1 in New York 102–95, but the Knicks regrouped themselves in Game 2 and blew out Indiana 105–79. In Game 3, Amar'e Stoudemire returned from knee surgery but couldn't help the Knicks as they lost 82–71. The Pacers won Game 4 in Indianapolis 93–82 to take a 3–1 series lead, but New York took Game 5 85–75 to stay alive. In Game 6, the Pacers went on an 11–3 run late to take the lead for good and win 106–99 to eliminate New York and advance to the Eastern Conference Finals, losing to the eventual NBA champions Miami Heat in 7.

== 2024 Eastern Conference semifinals ==
Coming into this series, all-star Julius Randle of the Knicks and Rising Stars MVP Bennedict Mathurin of the Pacers both missed the entirety of the 2024 NBA Playoffs due to season-ending injuries during the regular season. The Knicks finished their 2023–24 season 50–32, good enough for the 2nd seed in the East, while the Pacers ended their 2023–24 season 47–35, holding the 6th seed. In the first round, the Knicks defeated Joel Embiid, Tyrese Maxey, and the 76ers in 6 games, while the Pacers defeated the Bucks in six games.

Despite starting forward Julius Randle missing the series due to injury, the Knicks jumped out to a series lead after winning game one at home, after a series of controversial officiating decisions in the final minute. They also won game two, in which they further lost starter OG Anunoby to injury until game seven. The Pacers responded by winning games three and four at home, before the teams traded home wins in games five and six. The Pacers won the series with a historic offensive performance in game seven, winning the series 4–3 after routing the Knicks 130–109.

As for the Knicks in 2023–24, they were given the fan nickname the "Nova Knicks" due to several players from the 2016 Villanova Wildcats national championship team playing for them – Jalen Brunson, Donte DiVincenzo, Josh Hart and Ryan Arcidiacono (before being traded during the season) all played with the Knicks during that season.

== 2025 Eastern Conference finals ==
The Knicks and Pacers met again in the 2025 NBA playoffs, both reaching the Eastern Conference Finals for a berth to the 2025 NBA Finals. This is the second straight year the two teams met in the postseason and the first rematch in a Conference Final since the 2000 NBA playoffs which saw the Pacers reach the 2000 NBA Finals.

In 2024, following their playoff loss to the Pacers, the Knicks lost free agents Isaiah Hartenstein and Alec Burks. In response, the Knicks acquired Karl-Anthony Towns from the Minnesota Timberwolves in exchange for Julius Randle, Donte DiVincenzo and a first-round pick. The Knicks also acquired former Villanova Wildcat Mikal Bridges from the Brooklyn Nets in a package surrounding Bojan Bogdanović, Shake Milton, and five future first-round picks, plus a first-round pick swap. The trade reunited Bridges with his former Villanova teammates Jalen Brunson and Josh Hart. The group had been given the nickname the "Villanova Knicks" or "Nova Knicks" the previous season, with DiVincenzo having previously been the third member. To improve their bench, New York signed Cameron Payne, P. J. Tucker, Landry Shamet and acquired Delon Wright.

In game one, the Pacers orchestrated their third improbable comeback this playoffs, with a stunning 138–135 comeback win against the Knicks in Game 1. The Knicks led by 14 points with 2:51 minutes left, but Aaron Nesmith kept the Pacers in the game with a flurry of 3-pointers, becoming the first player in NBA history to make six 3-pointers in the fourth quarter of a playoff game. Still with a slim lead, Karl-Anthony Towns and OG Anunoby proceeded to go 1-for-2 each at the free throw line with less than 15 seconds left. After Anunoby's free throw make with 7.1 seconds left to put the Knicks up two, Tyrese Haliburton dribbled the ball up the court, attacked the rim, dribbled back out toward the 3-point line and fired up the jumper over Mitchell Robinson. The ball bounced high above the shot clock and miraculously went in. Haliburton did a choke signal towards the crowd, harking back to Pacers Hall of Famer Reggie Miller's choke sign at Spike Lee while leading an Indiana comeback in Game 5 of the 1994 Eastern Conference Finals (Miller was also in attendance at the game for TNT doing color commentary). While the Pacers rushed towards Haliburton in celebration thinking they had won the game, officials reviewed the last play and Haliburton's toes were on the 3-point line, which took the game to overtime. In total, the fourth quarter took 49 minutes in real time to play. In addition, the Pacers outscored the Knicks 20–6 from 2:51 in the fourth quarter until regulation. In OT, the trading of baskets continued between the teams, but a reviewed Jalen Brunson turnover and a two Obi Toppin dunks gave the Pacers the slight three point edge. With 10.1 seconds left, Brunson and Towns missed threes that would have tied the game, thus giving Indiana the win. Haliburton (31 points, 11 assists) and Nesmith (30 points, 8-for-9 from three) starred in the Pacers victory. The Knicks, who had a 99.7% chance of winning the game deep in the fourth quarter, were led by Brunson (45 points, 15-for-25 from the floor) and Towns (35 points, 11-for-17 from the floor, 12 rebounds).

Following an unbelievable comeback by the Pacers the previous game, neither team led by more than 10 points in Game 2. However, Indiana saw a huge performance by Pascal Siakam, who finished with 39 points on 15-23 shooting, including 16 in the 1st quarter. Despite Tyrese Haliburton contributing just 14 points on 5-16 shooting, he finished with a near triple-double with 8 rebounds and 11 assists. For New York, Jalen Brunson led the way with 36 points and 11 assists, but missed a potential game-tying 3-pointer as the Knicks failed to complete a late rally. Karl-Anthony Towns finished with 20 points and 7 rebounds, but was a team-low -20 in +/- and sat most of the fourth quarter. With this win, Indiana also took a 2–0 series lead on the road for the 2nd straight series, improving their road record to 6–1. Meanwhile, the Knicks dropped to a 3–5 record at Madison Square Garden in these playoffs.

Game 3 was held in Indianapolis on May 25, 2025, the same day as the Indy 500. The Knicks, trailing by 16 midway through the third quarter and still down 10 entering the fourth, with the dreaded 3–0 deficit looming, authored a comeback of their own to get back into the series with a 106–100 win on the road. Karl-Anthony Towns dominated the fourth quarter, scoring 20 of his 24 points in the quarter.

During Game 4 in Indiana, the Pacers won 130–121, with Tyrese Haliburton leading the Pacers with a 32-point, 15-assist and 12-rebound triple double, joining only Oscar Robertson and Nikola Jokić as the only players in NBA history to post 30 points, 15 assists and 10 rebounds in a playoff game. Haliburton also had no turnovers, becoming the first player in NBA history to put up such a scoreline with no turnovers. Pascal Siakam also contributed 30 points to the win. Former Knick Obi Toppin hit a game-clinching three with 46 seconds left to seal the deal against his former team.

The Knicks dominated Game 5 back at Madison Square Garden, with a 111–94 win. The Pacers never led the game, with the Knicks leading the entire game, starting 18 seconds into the game. Jalen Brunson put up 32 points, while Karl-Anthony Towns put up 24 points.

The Pacers once again hosted Game 6 back in Indianapolis. The game remained close throughout the first half, with the Pacers leading 58–54 at the half. However, the Pacers dominated the third quarter, outscoring the Knicks 34–23. The Pacers went on to win 125–108, with Siakam having 31 points, and Haliburton putting up 21, including 11 in the fourth quarter. For his efforts Siakam was awarded Eastern Conference Finals MVP. The Pacers won the series in 6 games, advancing to the 2025 NBA Finals for the first time since 2000 and for just the second time in franchise history.

Following their playoff loss to the Pacers, the Knicks announced on June 3, 2025, head coach Tom Thibodeau was fired after leading the franchise to consecutive 50 win seasons including four playoff berths and 2021 Coach of the Year.

The series was also notable for being the last NBA games broadcast by TNT after 36 years.

== Aftermath ==
=== 1994–2000: NBA Finals appearances & iconic moments ===
The Knicks reached the NBA Finals in 1994 and 1999, losing in seven games to the Rockets and five games to the Spurs, respectively. The defeat in 1994 denied New York the distinction of having both NBA and NHL championships in the same year, as Madison Square Garden hosted the New York Rangers first Stanley Cup celebration in 54 years following their win over the Canucks in game seven of the 1994 Stanley Cup Final while the series was in New York. (The Rockets had home court advantage during the 1994 Finals.) The Pacers finally reached the 2000 NBA Finals by defeating the Knicks in the 2000 Eastern Conference Finals, eventually losing to the Los Angeles Lakers in six games.

The playoff battles between these two franchises led to some of the greatest moments in NBA playoff history, such as Reggie Miller's 25 fourth quarter points in Game 5 of the 1994 Eastern Conference Finals, Miller's 8 points in the last 18.7 seconds to win Game 1 of the 1995 Eastern Conference Semifinals, and Larry Johnson's 4-point play in the waning seconds of Game 3 of the 1999 Eastern Conference Finals. Despite the animosity between the two teams, Reggie Miller was featured in a cameo in the 1998 film He Got Game, directed by Spike Lee. During Miller's final game at Madison Square Garden, the crowd began to chant Miller's name, while Miller and Lee embraced at the game's end.

In 1994, the Pacers addressed their need for a point guard by acquiring former Knick Mark Jackson from the Los Angeles Clippers in exchange for Pooh Richardson, Malik Sealy, and the draft rights to Eric Piatkowski. With the Pacers, he teamed with Reggie Miller, Rik Smits, Antonio Davis and Dale Davis for five out of the next six seasons to make the Indiana Pacers a contender. Jackson was traded to the Denver Nuggets before the 1996–97 NBA season started in exchange for rising star Jalen Rose. After falling out of playoff contention, and looking to re-energize the team's on-court performance, Pacers' president Donnie Walsh traded again for Jackson and LaSalle Thompson at the trade deadline, giving up Vincent Askew, Eddie Johnson and second-round picks in 1997 and 1998. The return of Jackson sparked the Pacers, but they still missed the playoffs for the only time in the last decade and a half. Jackson would eventually appear in his only NBA Finals as the Pacers' starting point guard in 2000, when they lost to the Los Angeles Lakers in six games. Shortly after, Jackson returned to the Knicks in 2001 and helped them reach the playoffs as a starter before retiring in 2004.

=== 2000–2010: Restructuring eras ===
In 2000, the Pacers hired Detroit Pistons legend Isiah Thomas as head coach on July 20, 2000. He succeeded Larry Bird, who previously coached the Pacers to the 2000 NBA Finals. Thomas would serve as head coach until 2003 before being hired by the Knicks as president of basketball operations on December 22, 2003. In 2006, Thomas became the head coach of the Knicks for two seasons before stepping down in 2008.

In 2003, the Knicks hired Pacers legend Herb Williams as an assistant coach. He would serve on the Knicks coaching staff until 2014, before joining the New York Liberty from 2015 to 2019. From 1981 to 1989, Williams averaged double figures in all seven of his full seasons as a Pacer, including a career-best 19.9 points per game in 1985–86. He remains among the Pacers' top ten career leaders in rebounds (4,494), blocks (1,094), and games played (577). In 1992, he was signed by the Knicks, where he spent seven years backing up Patrick Ewing. The Knicks made the 1994 and 1999 NBA Finals, with Williams serving as a team leader.

In 2005, the Chicago Bulls traded former key Pacer player Antonio Davis along with Eddy Curry to the Knicks for Michael Sweetney, Tim Thomas and Jermaine Jackson. Through 36 games with the Knicks, Davis averaged 5.0 points with 4.8 rebounds a game before being traded to the Toronto Raptors for former Pacers star and teammate Jalen Rose, a first-round draft pick, and an undisclosed sum of cash (believed to be around $3 million). This trade reunited Rose with Larry Brown, his coach for one year with the Pacers. The motivation behind this trade was apparently to free up cap space (Rose earned close to $16 million a year) and to allow the Raptors to acquire an experienced center who could relieve some of Chris Bosh's rebounding duties. Rose would leave the Knicks months later to join the Phoenix Suns in pursuit of an NBA Championship during their 2006–07 season before retiring the year after.

In 2007, the Knicks acquired former Pacer Fred Jones, along with Zach Randolph and Dan Dickau from the Portland Trail Blazers in exchange for Channing Frye and Steve Francis. As a member of the Pacers in 2004, Jones won the NBA Slam Dunk Contest, beating out two-time champion Jason Richardson, but did not compete in the contest again. The trade reunited Jones with Knicks head coach Isiah Thomas, the man who selected him in the 2002 NBA Draft by the Pacers. The Knicks did not re-sign him after the year.

Later, in 2008, the Knicks also acquired former Pacer Al Harrington in exchange for Jamal Crawford. In his two seasons with the Knicks, Harrington played the best basketball of his career, but did not reach the playoffs in either season. In 140 games (66 starts), he averaged 19.2 points, 5.9 rebounds, 1.4 assists and 1.0 steals in 32.7 minutes per game.

=== 2010–2023: Regaining relevancy ===
Following their 2013 series, promising Knicks rookie, Chris Copeland, received a two-year, $6.1 million offer sheet from the Pacers. The Knicks declined to match the offer, and Copeland signed with the Pacers on July 14. Copeland's production dropped off dramatically with the Pacers in 2013–14 as he averaged just 3.7 points and 6.5 minutes in 41 games, playing behind Paul George, Danny Granger and Evan Turner as Indiana lost in the Eastern Conference Finals to the Miami Heat "Big Three" (LeBron James, Dwyane Wade and Chris Bosh). Copeland would go on to have a larger role with the Pacers in 2014–15 due to several injuries to star players. For the Knicks in 2013, they acquired former Pacer star Metta World Peace.

In 2015 and 2016, the Pacers signed former Knicks centers Jordan Hill and Kevin Séraphin in back–to–back seasons. Hill and Séraphin served as backups to Myles Turner, helping Indiana reach the 2016 and 2017 playoffs.

In 2017, former Pacer Jarrett Jack signed with the Knicks. The same offseason, with the Knicks looking to rebuild, the team traded away star Carmelo Anthony in exchange for Doug McDermott, Enes Kanter and a 2018 second-round pick. McDermott played 55 games for the Knicks, averaging 7.2 points, before being moved to the Dallas Mavericks. Months later, McDermott signed with the Pacers on July 6, 2018, and received an increased role, helping the Pacers reach the 2019 and 2020 playoffs. He experienced his best season in the NBA in 2020–21, averaging 13.6 points and 3.3 rebounds on 53.2% shooting with the Pacers. In 2024, McDermott would return to the Pacers in a trade surrounding Buddy Hield, helping them reach the 2024 Eastern Conference Finals.

In 2019, the Knicks traded away star Kristaps Porziņģis alongside Trey Burke, Courtney Lee and Tim Hardaway Jr. to the Dallas Mavericks in exchange for Wesley Matthews, Dennis Smith Jr., DeAndre Jordan, an unprotected 2021 first-round draft pick, and an additional top-ten protected 2023 first-round draft pick. After playing only 2 games with the Knicks, Wesley Matthews was waived and immediately signed with the Pacers for the remainder of the year, joining former Knicks fan-favorite Kyle O'Quinn in Indiana. Matthews served as a starter for Indiana in all 23 games, averaging 10.9 points on 36.9% three-point shooting, helping the team reach the 2019 playoffs in the absence of Victor Oladipo due to injury. In 2019, the following season, the Pacers signed former Knick Justin Holiday, uniting him with his younger brother Aaron. In the 2024 NBA Finals, their older brother Jrue Holiday won his second championship alongside former Knick, Porziņģis on the Boston Celtics.

=== 2023–present: New eras ===
In 2023, the Pacers acquired Obi Toppin, the 8th overall pick in the 2020 NBA draft, from the Knicks in exchange for 2 future second–round picks. On the Pacers, Toppin joined Jalen Smith, Tyrese Haliburton, Aaron Nesmith, Jordan Nwora, and later James Wiseman, all selected in the 2020 NBA draft. The same season, in 2024, the Knicks acquired former Pacers Bojan Bogdanović and Duane Washington Jr.. The Knicks and Pacers would again meet in the 2024 Eastern Conference Semifinals, with the Pacers winning a historic game seven in New York. In a highly unlikely Eastern Conference Finals matchup in the 2025 NBA playoffs by betting odds, the Pacers had just beaten the top-seeded Cleveland Cavaliers in 5 games, while the Knicks upset the defending champion Boston Celtics in 6 games. In Game 1, the Knicks held a 14-point lead with under 3 minutes remaining in the 4th quarter, and later led by 9 with a minute left in regulation. However, the Pacers orchestrated a miraculous comeback, with Aaron Nesmith scoring 20 points in the 4th quarter along with six consecutive made 3-pointers, finishing with a playoff career-high 30 points. After both OG Anunoby and Karl-Anthony Towns made just 1 of 2 free throws, Tyrese Haliburton dribbled the ball out the 3-point line and raised up for a shot which bounced off the back rim, hit the shot clock and ultimately went in. Believing to have won the game, Haliburton did a choke celebration to the New York crowd, with legendary Pacer Reggie Miller coincidentally doing color commentary along with Kevin Harlan. However, the officials ruled that he stepped on the line, which meant he only tied the game. The Pacers ultimately won the game in overtime and also took Game 2 on the road, before the Knicks overcame their third 20-point deficit of the playoffs in a Game 3 win. In Game 4, Haliburton recorded 32 points, 12 rebounds and 15 assists in a victory with no turnovers, sending the Pacers to a 3–1 series lead. New York staved off elimination in Game 5 at home before the Pacers had a blowout win in Game 6, their 4th straight series win over the Knicks. Game 6 was also the final NBA game broadcast on TNT Sports.

The Knicks and Pacers faced each other in East Group B of the 2026 NBA Cup, with Indiana winning the group stage game at home 106–104. During the game, Karl-Anthony Towns recorded his 12th straight double-double to start the season, a Knicks franchise record, but missed a potential game-tying shot.

== Related media and events ==
The 1994 and 1995 series were the subject of 2010's Winning Time: Reggie Miller vs. the New York Knicks. Directed by Dan Klores, it is one of the original ESPN 30 for 30 documentaries.

World Wrestling Entertainment also referenced the rivalry. On June 28, 2024, after the 2024 series and the conclusion of the season, Logan Paul in a heel role brought out Tyrese Haliburton for his Money in the Bank qualifier match on Smackdown at Madison Square Garden against LA Knight and Santos Escobar. Jalen Brunson was watching in the front row and confronted Haliburton, including with a folded steel chair, when Haliburton threatened to pass Paul brass knuckles and received MVP chants for it. When the Knicks and Pacers were confirmed to face each other in the following year's Eastern Conference Finals, WWE Hall of Famer and Chief Content Officer Paul "Triple H" Levesque remarked in a tweet, "It's almost like we wrote it…" in response to an official ESPN tweet referencing the WrestleMania X-Seven poster showing Haliburton, Brunson and Madison Square Garden in place of Stone Cold Steve Austin, Dwayne "The Rock" Johnson and the Astrodome.

== Season-by-season results ==
New York Knicks vs. Indiana Pacers Season-by-Season Results
1970s (Knicks, 21–7)

Season	Season series		at New York Knicks	at Indiana Pacers	Overall series	Notes
1976–77	Tie	2–2	Tie, 1–1	Tie, 1–1	Tie; 2–2	As part of the merger with the American Basketball Association (ABA), the Indiana Pacers join the National Basketball Association (NBA) and are placed in the Western Conference and the Midwest Division.
1977–78	Knicks	3–1	Knicks, 2–0	Tie, 1–1	Knicks; 5–3	
1978–79	Tie	2–2	Knicks, 2–0	Pacers, 2–0	Knicks; 7–5	
1979–80	Pacers	4–2	Pacers, 2–1	Pacers, 2–1	Tie; 9–9	Pacers are moved to the Eastern Conference and the Central Division. On February 20, 1980, Pacers beat the Knicks 131–86, their largest victory against the Knicks with a 45–point differential.

1980s (Knicks, 32–21)

Season	Season series		at New York Knicks	at Indiana Pacers	Overall series	Notes
1980–81	Pacers	3–2	Pacers, 2–1	Tie, 1–1	Pacers; 12–11	
1981–82	Pacers	3–2	Tie, 1–1	Pacers, 2–1	Pacers; 15–13	
1982–83	Tie	3–3	Knicks, 2–1	Pacers, 2–1	Pacers; 18–16	
1983–84	Knicks	4–2	Knicks, 3–0	Pacers, 2–1	Tie; 20–20	
1984–85	Knicks	4–2	Knicks, 3–0	Pacers, 2–1	Knicks; 24–22	
1985–86	Knicks	4–2	Knicks, 3–0	Pacers, 2–1	Knicks; 28–24	Knicks draft Patrick Ewing. Knicks win 11 home games in a row against the Pacers.
1986–87	Pacers	3–2	Knicks, 2–1	Pacers, 2–0	Knicks; 30–27	
1987–88	Knicks	3–2	Knicks, 2–0	Pacers, 2–1	Knicks; 33–29	Pacers draft Reggie Miller.
1988–89	Knicks	5–0	Knicks, 3–0	Knicks, 2–0	Knicks; 38–29	On December 20, 1988, Knicks beat the Pacers 141–113, their most points scored in a game against the Pacers. Knicks record their first season series sweep against the Pacers and finish with a winning record at Indiana for the first time.
1989–90	Knicks	3–1	Knicks, 3–0	Tie, 1–1	Knicks; 41–30	

1990s (Knicks, 40–27)

Season	Season series		at New York Knicks	at Indiana Pacers	Overall series	Notes
1990–91	Tie	2–2	Tie, 1–1	Tie, 1–1	Knicks; 43–32	
1991–92	Knicks	3–1	Knicks, 2–0	Tie, 1–1	Knicks; 46–33	One game was played on Martin Luther King Jr. Day.
1992–93	Knicks	3–1	Knicks, 2–0	Tie, 1–1	Knicks; 49–34	
1993 Eastern Conference First Round	Knicks	3–1	Knicks, 2–0	Tie, 1–1	Knicks; 52–35	1st postseason series.
1993–94	Knicks	4–0	Knicks, 2–0	Knicks, 2–0	Knicks; 56–35	
1994 Eastern Conference Finals	Knicks	4–3	Knicks, 3–1	Pacers, 2–1	Knicks; 60–38	2nd postseason series. Knicks win 11 home games in a row against the Pacers. Knicks go on to lose 1994 NBA Finals.
1994–95	Knicks	3–1	Tie, 1–1	Knicks, 2–0	Knicks; 63–39	
1995 Eastern Conference Semifinals	Pacers	4–3	Tie, 2–2	Pacers, 2–1	Knicks; 66–43	3rd postseason series.
1995–96	Knicks	3–1	Knicks, 2–0	Tie, 1–1	Knicks; 69–44	
1996–97	Knicks	3–1	Knicks, 2–0	Tie, 1–1	Knicks; 72–45	
1997–98	Pacers	2–1	Tie, 1–1	Pacers, 1–0	Knicks; 73–47	
1998 Eastern Conference Semifinals	Pacers	4–1	Tie, 1–1	Pacers, 3–0	Knicks; 74–51	4th postseason series.
1998–99	Pacers	2–1	Knicks, 1–0	Pacers, 2–0	Knicks; 75–53	
1999 Eastern Conference Finals	Knicks	4–2	Knicks, 2–1	Knicks, 2–1	Knicks; 79–55	5th postseason series. Final games Pacers played at Market Square Arena. Knicks go on to lose 1999 NBA Finals.
1999–2000	Tie	2–2	Knicks, 2–0	Pacers, 2–0	Knicks; 81–57	Last season Patrick Ewing played for the Knicks. Pacers open Conseco Fieldhouse (now known as Gainbridge Fieldhouse). One game was played on Christmas.

2000s (Pacers, 27–16)

Season	Season series		at New York Knicks	at Indiana Pacers	Overall series	Notes
2000 Eastern Conference Finals	Pacers	4–2	Knicks, 2–1	Pacers, 3–0	Knicks; 83–61	6th postseason series. Pacers go on to lose 2000 NBA Finals.
2000–01	Tie	2–2	Tie, 1–1	Tie, 1–1	Knicks; 85–63	
2001–02	Pacers	2–1	Knicks, 1–0	Pacers, 2–0	Knicks; 86–65	
2002–03	Pacers	3–1	Tie, 1–1	Pacers, 2–0	Knicks; 87–68	
2003–04	Pacers	3–1	Tie, 1–1	Pacers, 2–0	Knicks; 88–71	Pacers finish with the best record in the league (61–21).
2004–05	Tie	2–2	Tie, 1–1	Tie, 1–1	Knicks; 90–73	Last season Reggie Miller played for the Pacers.
2005–06	Tie	2–2	Tie, 1–1	Tie, 1–1	Knicks; 92–75	
2006–07	Pacers	2–1	Pacers, 1–0	Tie, 1–1	Knicks; 93–77	Pacers finish with a winning record in New York for the first time since the 1980 season.
2007–08	Pacers	4–0	Pacers, 2–0	Pacers, 2–0	Knicks; 93–81	Pacers record their first season series sweep against the Knicks.
2008–09	Knicks	2–1	Tie, 1–1	Knicks, 1–0	Knicks; 95–82	Knicks win the season series for the first time since the 1996 season and finish with a winning record at Indiana in the regular season for the first time since the 1994.
2009–10	Tie	2–2	Tie, 1–1	Tie, 1–1	Knicks; 97–84	On January 3, 2010, Knicks beat the Pacers 132–89, their largest victory against the Pacers with a 43–point differential.

2010s (Pacers, 27–14)

Season	Season series		at New York Knicks	at Indiana Pacers	Overall series	Notes
2010–11	Tie	2–2	Tie, 1–1	Tie, 1–1	Knicks; 99–86	Pacers draft Paul George. Knicks acquired Carmelo Anthony via trade.
2011–12	Knicks	2–1	Knicks, 1–0	Tie, 1–1	Knicks; 101–87	Knicks record their 100th win against the Pacers. Knicks finish with a winning record at home against the Pacers for the first time since the 2001 season.
2012–13	Tie	2–2	Knicks, 2–0	Pacers, 2–0	Knicks; 103–89	
2013 Eastern Conference Semifinals	Pacers	4–2	Knicks, 2–1	Pacers, 3–0	Knicks; 105–93	7th postseason series.
2013–14	Pacers	2–1	Tie, 1–1	Pacers, 1–0	Knicks; 106–95	
2014–15	Pacers	4–0	Pacers, 2–0	Pacers, 2–0	Knicks; 106–99	
2015–16	Pacers	3–0	Pacers, 1–0	Pacers, 2–0	Knicks; 106–102	Pacers record their 100th win against the Knicks.
2016–17	Knicks	3–1	Knicks, 2–0	Tie, 1–1	Knicks; 109–103	Pacers win 12 home games in a row against the Knicks. Paul George traded to the Oklahoma City Thunder after the season. Last season Carmelo Anthony played for the Knicks.
2017–18	Pacers	2–1	Knicks, 1–0	Pacers, 2–0	Knicks; 110–105	
2018–19	Pacers	4–0	Pacers, 2–0	Pacers, 2–0	Knicks; 110–109	
2019–20	Pacers	2–1	Pacers, 2–0	Knicks, 1–0	Tie; 111–111	Due to the COVID-19 pandemic suspending the season, their remaining game at Indiana was canceled.

2020s (Knicks, 18–17)

Season	Season series		at New York Knicks	at Indiana Pacers	Overall series	Notes
2020–21	Knicks	2–1	Knicks, 1–0	Tie, 1–1	Knicks; 113–112	
2021–22	Tie	2–2	Knicks, 2–0	Pacers, 2–0	Knicks; 115–114	Pacers acquire Tyrese Haliburton via trade.
2022–23	Knicks	3–1	Tie, 1–1	Knicks, 2–0	Knicks; 118–115	Knicks acquire Jalen Brunson via free agency. On April 9, 2023, Pacers beat the Knicks 141–136, their most points scored in a game against the Knicks.
2023–24	Pacers	2–1	Tie, 1–1	Pacers, 1–0	Knicks; 119–117	Pacers lose the inaugural 2023 NBA Cup.
2024 Eastern Conference Semifinals	Pacers	4–3	Knicks, 3–1	Pacers, 3–0	Knicks; 122–121	8th postseason series.
2024–25	Knicks	2–1	Knicks, 1–0	Tie, 1–1	Knicks; 124–122	
2025 Eastern Conference Finals	Pacers	4–2	Pacers, 2–1	Pacers, 2–1	Tie; 126–126	9th postseason series. Pacers go on to lose 2025 NBA Finals.
2025–26	Knicks	3–1	Tie, 1–1	Knicks, 2–0	Knicks; 129–127	Tyrese Haliburton misses the entire season with a torn Achilles tendon. Knicks win 2025 NBA Cup. Knicks win 2026 NBA Finals.
2026–27	Pacers	1–0	November 22, 2026 and April 11, 2027	Pacers, 1–0	Knicks; 129–128	On November 13, 2026, at Indiana, the Pacers beat the Knicks 106–104 during the 2026 NBA Cup group stage.

Summary of Results

Season	Season series		at New York Knicks	at Indiana Pacers	Notes
Regular season games	Knicks	105–98	Knicks, 67–33	Pacers, 65–38	
Postseason games	Pacers	30–24	Knicks, 18–10	Pacers, 20–6	
Postseason series	Pacers	6–3	Pacers, 4–2	Pacers, 2–1	Eastern Conference First Round: 1993; Eastern Conference Semifinals: 1995, 1998, 2013, 2024; Eastern Conference Finals: 1994, 1999, 2000, 2025
Regular and postseason	Knicks	129–128	Knicks, 85–43	Pacers, 84–45	

== Individual Records ==
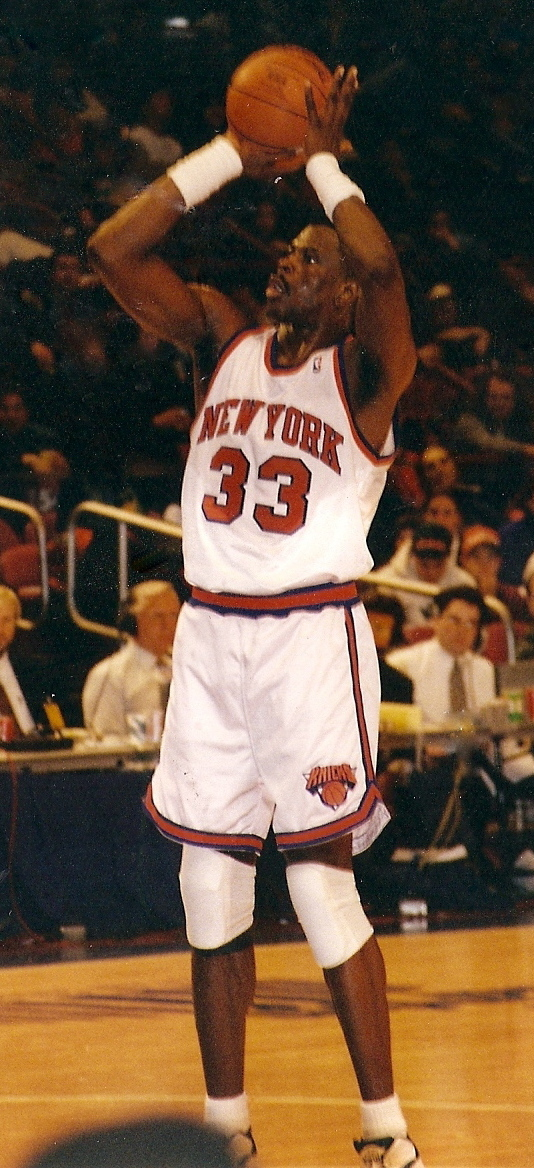
Patrick Ewing has scored the most points in the regular season in this rivalry. His scoring average against the Pacers notably decreased in the postseason.

=== Top Scorers (Regular Season) ===
Rank	Player	Team	Points	GP	PPG
1	Patrick Ewing	Knicks	1,319	57	23.1
2	Reggie Miller	Pacers	1,231	67	18.4
3	Herb Williams	Pacers/Knicks	691	52	13.3
4	Bill Cartwright	Knicks	608	33	18.4
5	Rik Smits	Pacers	601	45	13.4
6	Chuck Person	Pacers	567	26	21.8
7	Billy Knight	Pacers	508	26	19.4
8	Mark Jackson	Pacers/Knicks	481	46	10.5
9	Jermaine O'Neal	Pacers	476	25	19.0
10	Carmelo Anthony	Knicks	445	18	24.7

==== Per Game (Regular Season, min. 10 GP) ====
1. Bernard King (NYK) – 26.8 (14 GP)
2. Carmelo Anthony (NYK) – 24.7 (18 GP)
3. Patrick Ewing (NYK) – 23.1 (57 GP)
4. Chuck Person (IND) – 21.8 (26 GP)
5. RJ Barrett (NYK) – 21.6 (12 GP)
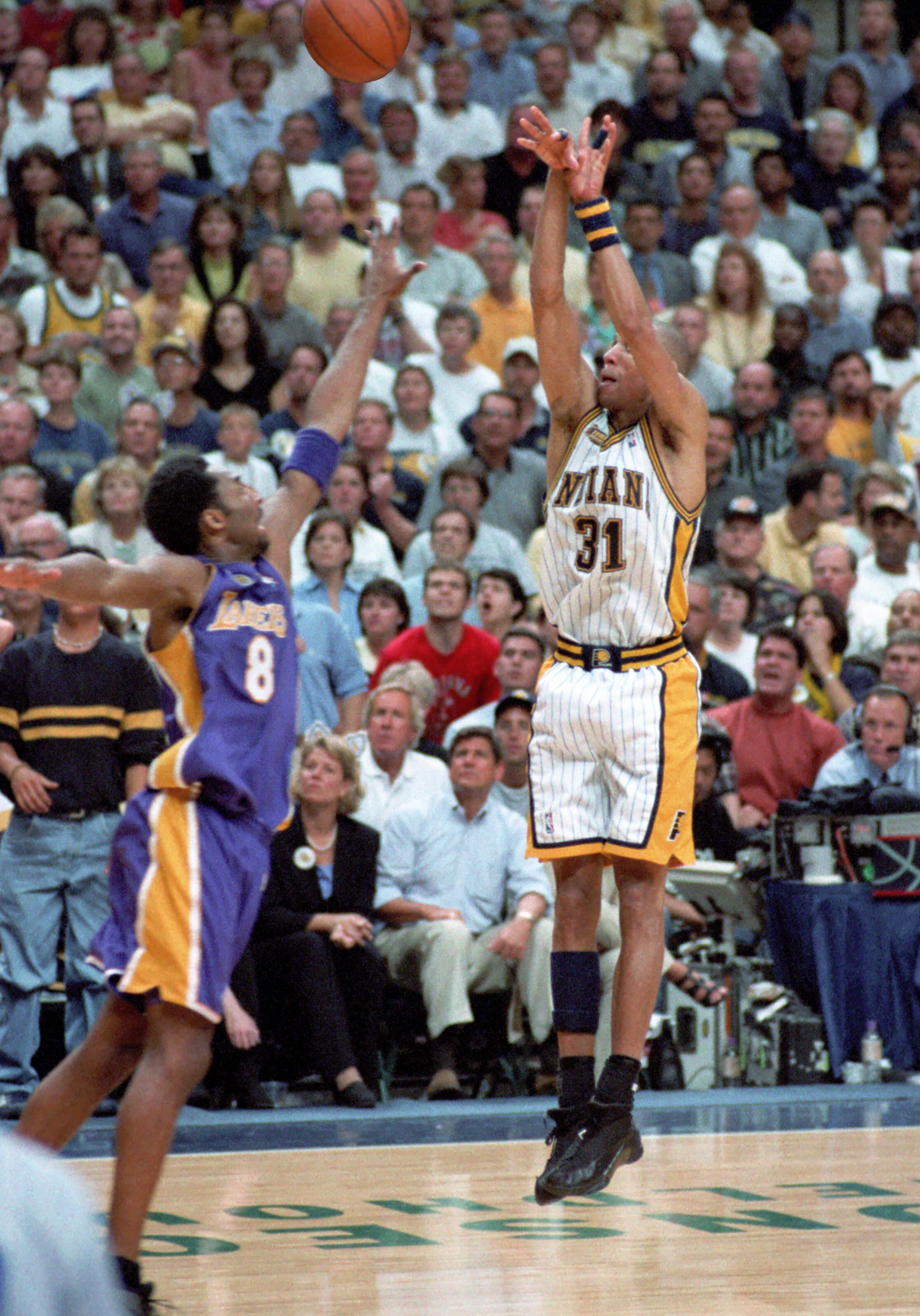
  Reggie Miller (right) scored the most points in the playoffs and played the most games in this rivalry. His antagonism of Knicks super-fan Spike Lee and clutch shot-making elevated both the rivalry and his own reputation.

=== Top Scorers (NBA Playoffs) ===
Rank	Player	Team	Points	GP	PPG
1	Reggie Miller	Pacers	808	35	23.1
2	Rik Smits	Pacers	591	35	16.9
3	Patrick Ewing	Knicks	526	28	18.8
4	Jalen Brunson	Knicks	392	13	30.2
5	John Starks	Knicks	368	23	16.0
6	Allan Houston	Knicks	322	17	18.9
7	Pascal Siakam	Pacers	289	13	22.2
8	Tyrese Haliburton	Pacers	275	13	21.2
8	Charles Oakley	Knicks	275	23	12.0

==== Per Game (Playoffs) ====
1. Jalen Brunson (NYK) – 30.2 (13 GP)
2. Carmelo Anthony (NYK) – 28.5 (6 GP)
3. Karl-Anthony Towns (NYK) – 24.8 (6 GP)
4. Reggie Miller (IND) – 23.1 (35 GP)
5. Donte DiVincenzo (NYK) – 22.7 (7 GP)
6. Pascal Siakam (IND) – 22.2 (13 GP)
7. Tyrese Haliburton (IND) – 21.2 (13 GP)
