= Johnny Furphy =

Australian basketball player (born 2004)

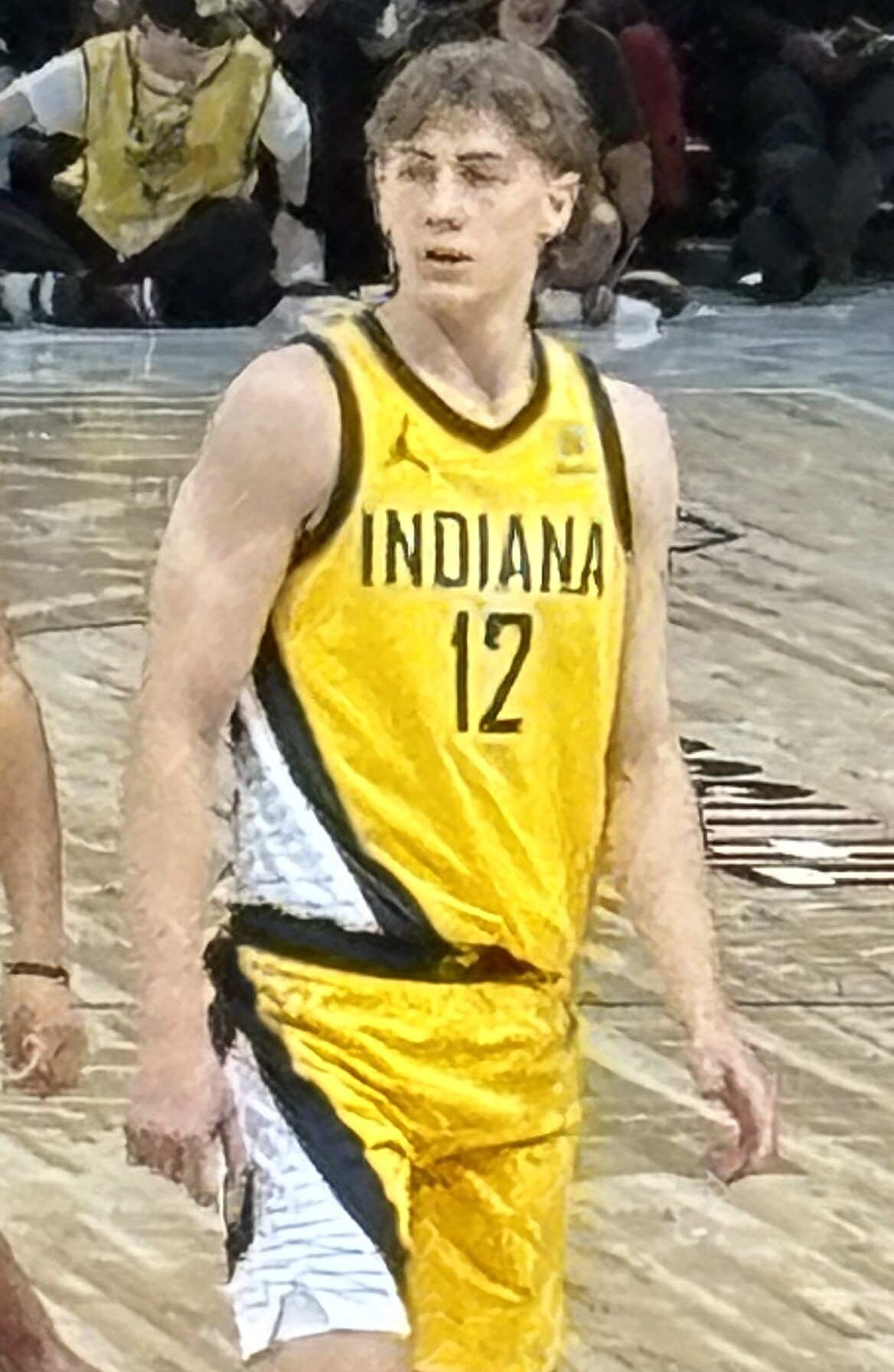
- Furphy with the Indiana Pacers in 2025

No. 12 – Indiana Pacers
- Position: Shooting guard
- League: NBA

Personal information
- Born: 8 December 2004 (age 21) Melbourne, Victoria, Australia
- Listed height: 6 ft 8 in (2.03 m)
- Listed weight: 200 lb (91 kg)

Career information
- High school: Maribyrnong College (Melbourne, Victoria)
- College: Kansas (2023–2024)
- NBA draft: 2024: 2nd round, 35th overall pick
- Drafted by: San Antonio Spurs
- Playing career: 2021–present

Career history
- 2021: Hawthorn Magic
- 2022–2023: BA Centre of Excellence
- 2024–present: Indiana Pacers
- 2025: →Indiana Mad Ants

Career highlights
- Big 12 All-Freshman team (2024)
- Stats at NBA.com
- Stats at Basketball Reference

John William Furphy (born 8 December 2004) is an Australian professional basketball player for the Indiana Pacers of the National Basketball Association (NBA). He played college basketball for the Kansas Jayhawks, where he earned All-Big 12 Freshman Team honors. Furphy was selected 35th overall by the San Antonio Spurs in the second round of the 2024 NBA draft and was subsequently traded to the Pacers. He made his NBA debut during the 2024–25 NBA season and appeared in the 2025 NBA Finals.

== Early life ==
Furphy was born on 8 December 2004 in Melbourne, Victoria, and grew up in the suburb of Clifton Hill. From an early age, he aspired to earn a college scholarship in the United States, a goal he expressed while in fifth grade. He attended Maribyrnong College, where he was a member of the Maribyrnong Sports Academy, an elite sports program at the school. Furphy enrolled as a basketball athlete and Year 7 student in 2017 and graduated in 2022. During high school, he was a multi-sport athlete, competing in basketball, cricket, and football. He stated that football served as his secondary option if his basketball career did not materialize.

== Semi-professional career ==
During his teenage years, Furphy competed in various semi-professional basketball leagues across Australia. He played in the Big V for two seasons from 2021 to 2022. During the 2021 season, he played for the Hawthorn Magic in the Championship division, appearing in just two games before the season was cancelled midway due to the COVID-19 pandemic. That season, he averaged 2.0 points and 1.5 rebounds per game. The following year, he started the 2022 season playing for the Melbourne University Black Angels in the Division One, appearing in nine games and averaging 12.6 points and 4.0 rebounds per game. Midway through that season, Furphy relocated to Canberra to join the Basketball Australia Centre of Excellence (CoE), competing in the NBL1 for two seasons from 2022 to 2023. Furphy appeared in three games for the CoE in July of the 2022 season and remained with the team for the 2023 season, during which he averaged 14.3 points and 5.6 rebounds per game over 12 games.

== College career ==
Furphy committed to play college basketball for the Kansas Jayhawks in the United States after signing his national letter of intent on 3 August 2023. He chose Kansas over offers from Connecticut, Duke, Gonzaga, and North Carolina. Days after his commitment, Furphy participated in a training session that included scrimmages and basketball drills with the South East Melbourne Phoenix of the National Basketball League (NBL). Later that month, he relocated to Lawrence, Kansas, to begin his college career at the University of Kansas.

Furphy made his collegiate debut as a true freshman in the season opener against North Carolina Central on 6 November 2023, recording six points and five rebounds in a 99–56 victory. He made his first career start against Chaminade on 20 November, contributing four points and two rebounds in an 83–56 win. Furphy delivered his best collegiate performance against Cincinnati on 22 January 2024, posting season highs of 23 points and 11 rebounds in a 74–69 victory. He played his final college game during the Round of 32 in the 2024 NCAA tournament, tallying nine points and seven rebounds in an 89–68 loss to Gonzaga on 23 March. Kansas finished their season with a 23–11 record, during which Furphy played a significant role as a reserve wing. He played in 33 games with 19 starts, averaging 9.0 points, 4.9 rebounds, and 1.0 assists per game while shooting 46.6 percent from the field. Furphy’s standout rookie performance earned him selection to the Big 12 All-Freshman Team.

After the 2023–24 season, Furphy declared for the 2024 NBA draft on 16 April 2024, forgoing his remaining college eligibility. He later received an invitation to the draft green room, having been projected to be an early-round draft pick. Having grown up as an NBA fan, particularly admiring LeBron James and rooting for the Philadelphia 76ers, Furphy expressed excitement about fulfilling his long-held childhood dream of competing on the same court as his basketball idols.

== Professional career ==
=== Indiana Pacers (2024–present) ===
==== 2024–25 ====
Furphy was selected 35th overall by the San Antonio Spurs in the second round of the 2024 NBA draft on 27 June 2024. Later that same night, he was traded to the Indiana Pacers in exchange for the 36th overall pick, Juan Núñez, and cash considerations. He signed a four-year contract worth $8.59 million with the Pacers on 6 July.

Furphy made his National Basketball Association (NBA) debut on 25 October 2024, at the age of 19 in a game against the New York Knicks. He entered the game late in the fourth quarter with 4:59 remaining, while the Pacers were trailing 113–83. Furphy did not score in the game, missing all three of his field goal attempts and one three-point attempt. The Pacers ultimately lost the game 123–98. Months after his initial debut, Furphy delivered his best NBA performance against the Orlando Magic on 11 April 2025, in what was the second-last game of the Pacers' regular season. In a 129–115 loss, he scored a career-high 17 points with six rebounds and three assists in a then-career-high 32 minutes played. Furphy finished the 2024–25 NBA season having played in 50 games, all substitutions coming off the bench, averaging 2.1 points, 1.4 rebounds, and 0.4 assists per game while shooting 38.0 percent from the field.

As a rookie, Furphy primarily served as a substitute to rest starters and gain playing time in the closing minutes of games with decided outcomes. Throughout the season, he was frequently assigned to the Indiana Mad Ants, the Pacers' NBA G League affiliate, shuttling between the Mad Ants and the Pacers' bench. Furphy made his G League debut on 7 January 2025 in a game against the Maine Celtics, recording 11 points, eight rebounds, and one assist in a 118–115 victory. He finished the 2024–25 NBA G League season having started 10 games, averaging 14.3 points, 9.6 rebounds, and 1.8 assists per game while shooting 45.3 percent from the field.

==== 2025–26 ====
Furphy began the 2025–26 NBA season with limited playing time due to injuries affecting his left foot and ankle that started during the preseason. During a game against the Milwaukee Bucks on 3 November 2025, he sustained a sprain to his left ankle after falling while driving to the basket in the fourth quarter. Following the game, which ended in a 117–115 loss, Furphy was seen leaving the locker room using crutches. He returned to action on 3 December after missing 14 games. On 8 February 2026, he sustained a torn right ACL in the Pacers' 122–104 loss to the Toronto Raptors, which saw him be ruled out for the rest of the season. He made 34 appearances and 21 starts in his second season with Indiana, averaging 5.2 points, 4.4 rebounds, 1.1 assists, and 18.5 minutes of court time per game.

== Player profile ==
Furphy is 6 feet 8 inches (2.03 m) tall and weighs 200 pounds (91 kg). He has indicated that he models his playing style on that of Mikal Bridges.

== Career statistics ==
Legend
GP	Games played	GS	Games started	MPG	Minutes per game
FG%	Field goal percentage	3P%	3-point field goal percentage	FT%	Free throw percentage
RPG	Rebounds per game	APG	Assists per game	SPG	Steals per game
BPG	Blocks per game	PPG	Points per game	**Bold**	Career high

=== NBA ===
==== Regular season ====
Year	Team	GP	GS	MPG	FG%	3P%	FT%	RPG	APG	SPG	BPG	PPG
2024–25	Indiana	**50**	0	7.6	.380	.300	**.818**	1.4	.4	.4	**.2**	2.1
2025–26	Indiana	35	**21**	**18.4**	**.470**	**.324**	.486	**4.4**	**1.2**	**.6**	**.2**	**5.1**
Career		85	21	12.0	.436	.314	.614	2.6	.7	.4	.2	3.3

==== Playoffs ====
Year	Team	GP	GS	MPG	FG%	3P%	FT%	RPG	APG	SPG	BPG	PPG
2025	Indiana	11	0	3.2	.250	.000	.000	.5	.1	.0	.1	.2
Career		11	0	3.2	.250	.000	.000	.5	.1	.0	.1	.2

=== College ===
Year	Team	GP	GS	MPG	FG%	3P%	FT%	RPG	APG	SPG	BPG	PPG
2023–24	Kansas	33	19	24.1	.466	.352	.765	4.9	1.0	.9	.3	9.0

== Personal life ==
Furphy comes from a family of athletes and is the youngest of three siblings. His father, Richard Furphy, played amateur football for the University Blues in the Victorian Amateur Football Association (VAFA), where he served as team captain. Furphy's mother, Liza Alpers, is a former diver who competed at the national level. His eldest sibling and brother, Joe Furphy, played semi-professional football for the Geelong Cats in the Victorian Football League (VFL) during the 2024 season as part of their reserve team. Furphy's older sister, Holly Furphy, is a professional soccer player for Melbourne Victory in the A-League Women. Furphy is a fifth cousin of former UConn Huskies men's basketball player Jacob Furphy.
