= Tyrese Haliburton =

American basketball player (born 2000)

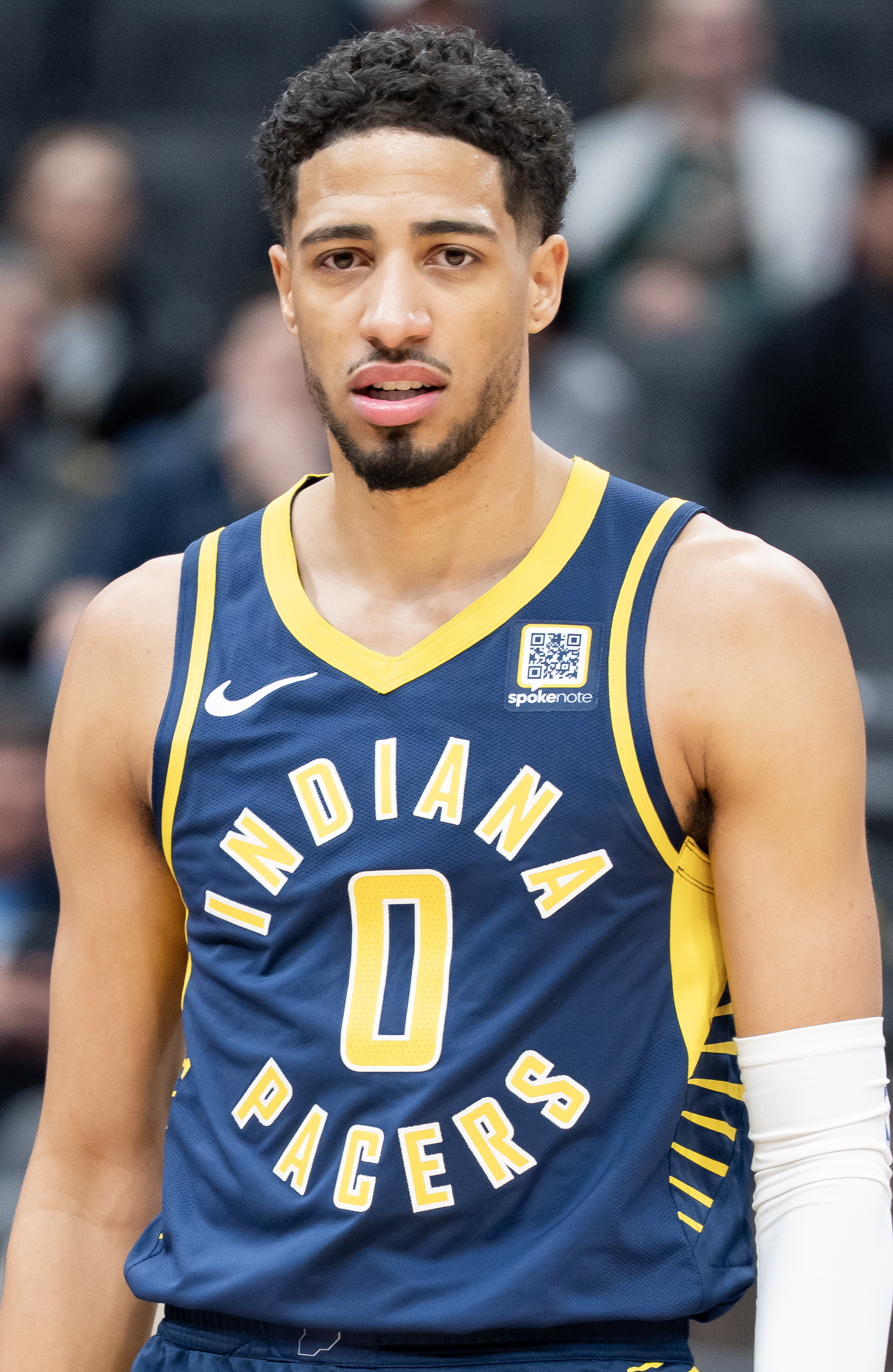
- Haliburton with the Indiana Pacers in 2025

No. 0 – Indiana Pacers
- Position: Point guard
- League: NBA

Personal information
- Born: February 29, 2000 (age 26) Oshkosh, Wisconsin, U.S.
- Listed height: 6 ft 5 in (1.96 m)
- Listed weight: 185 lb (84 kg)

Career information
- High school: Oshkosh North (Oshkosh, Wisconsin)
- College: Iowa State (2018–2020)
- NBA draft: 2020: 1st round, 12th overall pick
- Drafted by: Sacramento Kings
- Playing career: 2020–present

Career history
- 2020–2022: Sacramento Kings
- 2022–present: Indiana Pacers

Career highlights
- 2× NBA All-Star (2023, 2024); 2× All-NBA Third Team (2024, 2025); NBA All-Rookie First Team (2021); NBA assists leader (2024); Second-team All-Big 12 (2020)
- Stats at NBA.com
- Stats at Basketball Reference
Medals
Men's basketball
Representing United States
Olympic Games
Gold medal – first place	2024 Paris	Team
FIBA Under-19 World Cup
Gold medal – first place	2019 Greece	Team

Tyrese John Haliburton (born February 29, 2000) is an American professional basketball player for the Indiana Pacers of the National Basketball Association (NBA). Nicknamed "Hali" and "the Haliban", he is a two-time NBA All-Star and two-time All-NBA Third Team selection.

As a freshman playing college basketball with the Iowa State Cyclones, Haliburton set the program's single-game assists record. He had breakout success as a sophomore and was named to the All-Big 12 Conference second team despite suffering a season-ending wrist injury.

Haliburton was selected by the Sacramento Kings 12th overall in the 2020 NBA draft. In 2022, he was acquired by the Indiana Pacers as part of a trade package for Domantas Sabonis. Haliburton then earned back-to-back East All-Star selections, being named to the All-Star team as a reserve in 2023 and as a starter in 2024. In 2025, he led the Pacers to their first NBA Finals appearance in 25 years, where he would ultimately rupture his Achilles minutes into Game 7.

In 2019, Haliburton helped the United States to a gold medal and earned all-tournament team honors at the FIBA Under-19 World Cup in Heraklion, Greece. He was also on the national team roster that won gold at the 2024 Summer Olympics in Paris.

== Early life and family ==
Haliburton was born on a leap day, February 29, 2000, in Oshkosh, Wisconsin. He is the son of John and Brenda Haliburton. John is a basketball referee and former women's basketball coach while Brenda has attended nearly all of her son's basketball games. Haliburton has a younger brother, Marcel, from his parents' marriage, and two older brothers from his mother's previous marriage.

Haliburton's father is African-American and his mother is white.

== High school career ==
Haliburton played basketball for Oshkosh North High School in Oshkosh, Wisconsin. As a sophomore, he was named to the All-Fox Valley Association (FVA) second team and defensive team. In his junior season, Haliburton averaged 18 points, six assists and five rebounds per game, earning FVA Player of the Year and Wisconsin Basketball Coaches Association (WBCA) Division I All-State accolades with his team falling just short of the State Tournament.

As a senior, Haliburton averaged 22.9 points, 6.2 assists, 5.1 rebounds, 3.5 steals and 1.7 blocks per game, leading Oshkosh North to a 26–1 record. On February 18, 2018, he scored a career-high 42 points in a win over Kaukauna High School and West Virginia recruit Jordan McCabe. Haliburton scored 31 points, including 24 in the second half, and shot 18 of 18 from the free throw line in a Wisconsin Interscholastic Athletic Association Division I state championship victory over Brookfield East High School, his program's first state title. He was named Oshkosh Northwestern All-Area Player of the Year, Wisconsin Gatorade Player of the Year, and FVA co-Player of the Year. Haliburton was selected to the WBCA Division I All-State team and the USA Today All-USA Wisconsin first team.

=== Recruiting ===
Considered a three-star recruit by major recruiting services, he committed to playing college basketball for Iowa State on September 18, 2017.

College recruiting
Name	Hometown	School	Height	Weight	Commit date
Tyrese Haliburton; PG	Oshkosh, WI	Oshkosh North (WI)	6 ft 5 in (1.96 m)	170 lb (77 kg)	Sep 18, 2017
Tyrese Haliburton; PG	Recruit ratings: Rivals: 247Sports: ESPN: (78)				
Overall recruit ranking: 247Sports: 177
Note: In many cases, Scout, Rivals, 247Sports, On3, and ESPN may conflict in their listings of height and weight.; In these cases, the average was taken. ESPN grades are on a 100-point scale.; Sources: "Iowa State 2018 Basketball Commitments". Rivals.; "2018 Iowa State Cyclones Recruiting Class". ESPN.; "2018 Team Ranking". Rivals.

== College career ==
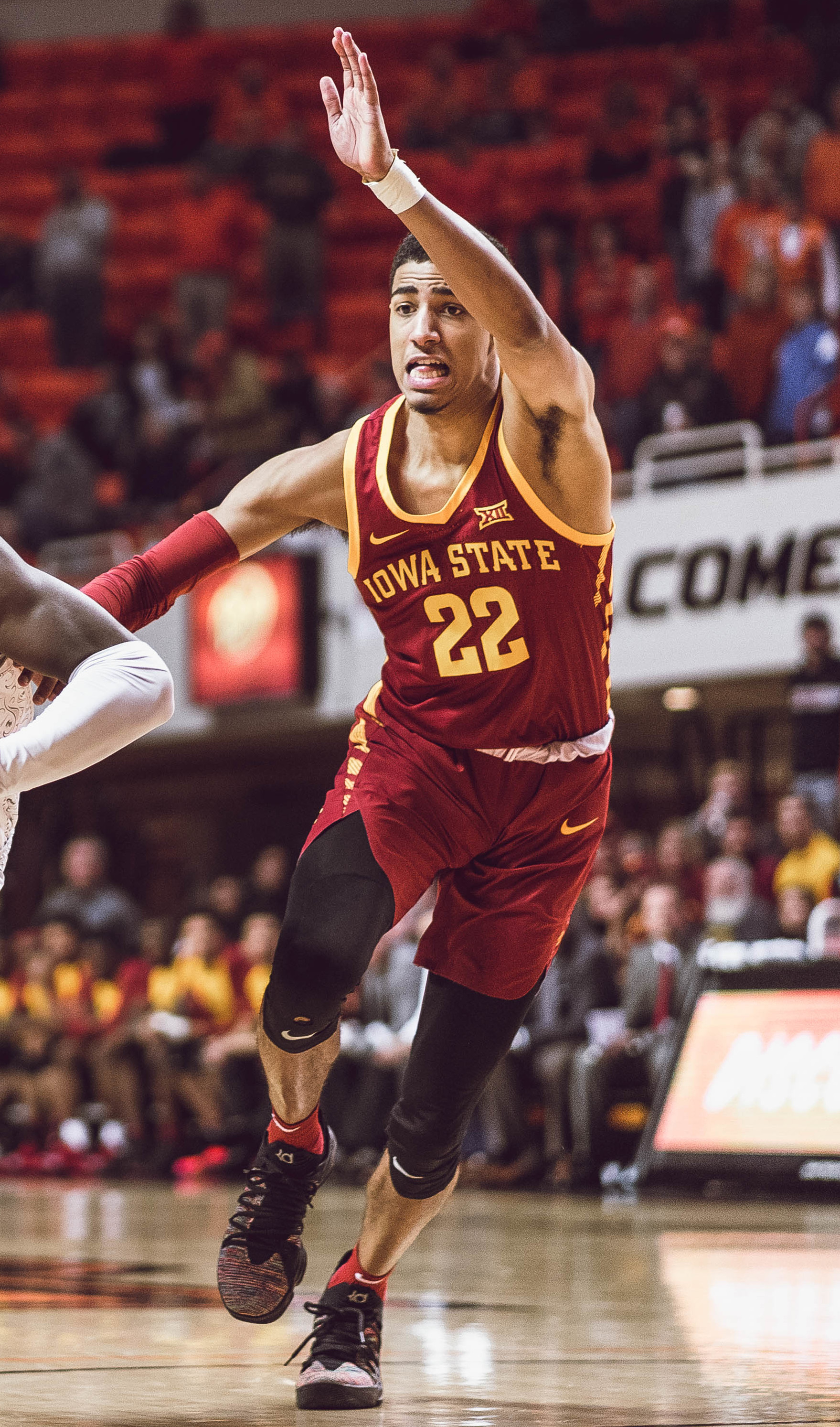
Haliburton with Iowa State in 2019

On November 6, 2018, Haliburton made his college debut for Iowa State, posting 12 points, four rebounds and four assists in a 79–53 victory over Alabama State. He scored a season-high 16 points in an 82–55 victory against Omaha on November 26. On December 9, Haliburton recorded 15 points and 17 assists, with one turnover, in a 101–65 victory over Southern. His 17 assists were the most by an Iowa State player in any game, surpassing the previous record set by Eric Heft in 1974. Through 35 appearances in his freshman season, Haliburton averaged 6.8 points, 3.6 assists and 1.5 steals per game. He was the only NCAA Division I true freshman, other than Zion Williamson, to accumulate at least 50 steals and 30 blocks. Haliburton had an assist-to-turnover ratio of 4.5, which led the Big 12 Conference and ranked second in Division I.

Haliburton was named Big 12 Player of the Week on November 11, 2019, during his sophomore season, after averaging 13.5 points and 13.0 assists in wins over Mississippi Valley State and Oregon State. On November 27, he scored a season-high 25 points, to go with nine rebounds and five assists, in an 83–76 loss to Michigan at the Battle 4 Atlantis. On January 4, 2020, Haliburton recorded 22 points, 12 rebounds and 10 assists in an overtime loss to TCU, the first triple-double by an Iowa State player since Monté Morris in 2016. He was subsequently named Big 12 Player of the Week for the second time. After fracturing his left wrist on February 8 during a game against Kansas State, Haliburton was ruled out for the rest of the season. He averaged 15.2 points, 5.9 rebounds, 6.5 assists and 2.5 steals per game as a sophomore. Haliburton was named to the second-team All-Big 12. After the season, he announced that he would enter the 2020 NBA draft and forgo his remaining college basketball eligibility.

== Professional career ==
=== Sacramento Kings (2020–2022) ===
==== 2020–21: All-Rookie honors ====
Haliburton was selected with the 12th pick by the Sacramento Kings in the first round of the 2020 NBA draft. On November 27, 2020, the Kings officially announced they had signed Haliburton. On December 23, he made his NBA debut, coming off the bench in a 124–122 overtime victory over the Denver Nuggets with 12 points, four assists, two rebounds and a block. On April 14, 2021, Haliburton recorded a career-high six steals in a 123–111 loss to the Washington Wizards.

On May 2, 2021, Haliburton suffered a left knee injury against the Dallas Mavericks. Although an MRI later revealed no ligament damage, it was announced that he would miss the last seven games of the Kings' 2020–21 season as a precaution. After the season, Haliburton finished third in Rookie of the Year voting and was named to the NBA All-Rookie First Team.

==== 2021–22: Final year in Sacramento ====
On January 29, 2022, Haliburton scored his Kings' then-career-high 38 points along with seven assists, three rebounds and two steals in a 103–101 loss against the Philadelphia 76ers. Exactly a week later, in his final game as a King, Haliburton posted a then-career-high 17 assists, along with 13 points, six rebounds and two steals in a 113–103 victory over the Oklahoma City Thunder.

With the trade deadline approaching, the Kings were seeking to acquire a center and held a surplus of point guards. The team had signed De'Aaron Fox to a five-year extension in 2020 to solidify him as the franchise's starting point guard, and later selected Davion Mitchell in the 2021 NBA draft. As a result, Haliburton became Sacramento's best trade asset in efforts to immediately improve the roster and end an NBA-record 16-year playoff drought.

=== Indiana Pacers (2022–present) ===
==== 2021–22: First year in Indiana ====
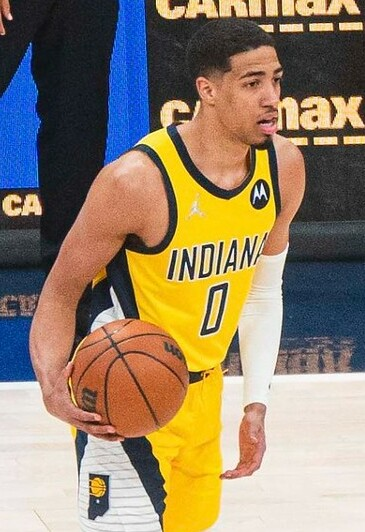
Haliburton in 2022

On February 8, 2022, Haliburton, Buddy Hield, and Tristan Thompson were traded to the Indiana Pacers in exchange for Domantas Sabonis, Justin Holiday, Jeremy Lamb and a 2023 second-round pick. At the time of the trade, Pacers coach Rick Carlisle referred to Haliburton as "an elite young point guard that affects the game positively in many, many ways". Pacers president Kevin Pritchard stated that the team intended on building around Haliburton as its long-term centerpiece. The acquisition was regarded as a steal for the Pacers by Sports Illustrated.

On February 11, Haliburton made his Pacers debut in a 120–113 loss to the Cleveland Cavaliers, logging 23 points in addition to six assists, three rebounds, and three steals. Five days later, Haliburton recorded 21 points and 14 assists in his first win with the Pacers, defeating the Washington Wizards 113–108. Haliburton participated in the NBA's 2022 Rising Stars Challenge alongside teammate Chris Duarte. Haliburton and Desmond Bane were the winners of the 2022 Clorox Clutch Challenge at the NBA All-Star Weekend.

On March 8, Haliburton scored 25 points in a 127–124 loss to the Cavaliers. He scored another 25 points in a 131–128 loss to the Atlanta Hawks five days later. On March 23, in the first game against his former team, Haliburton recorded 13 points, 15 assists and three steals in a one-point loss to the Sacramento Kings. Five days later, he recorded a 25-point, 13-assist double-double in a loss to the Hawks.

On April 1, Haliburton scored 30 points against the Boston Celtics, but was fouled out in the fourth quarter, leading to a 128–123 loss. Two days later, Haliburton tallied a near triple-double with 19 points, 17 assists, nine rebounds and no turnovers against the Detroit Pistons, recording the most assists in a game by a Pacer since T. J. McConnell in the 2020–21 season. In the 26 games he played for Indiana after the trade deadline, Haliburton averaged 17.5 points and 9.6 assists.

==== 2022–23: First All-Star selection ====
During the offseason, Haliburton worked on improving his game and his chemistry with the rest of the Pacers roster. On November 21, Haliburton was selected Eastern Conference Player of the Week, leading the Pacers to a 3–0 record while averaging 21 points, 11 assists and four rebounds per game. Eight days later, Haliburton became the first player in NBA history to record 40-plus assists and no turnovers in a three-game stretch, averaging 20 points, 13.3 assists, six rebounds and 2.3 steals per game. On December 23, Haliburton made a game-winning three-pointer and finished with a then-career-high 43 points on a Pacers franchise-record 10 three-pointers along with seven assists in a 121–118 victory over the Miami Heat.

In early 2023, Haliburton missed two weeks due to elbow and knee injuries, with the team going 1–9 in his absence. In his return on February 2 against the Los Angeles Lakers, Haliburton tallied 26 points, 12 assists, and two steals in a narrow 112–111 loss. Haliburton was named to his first-ever NBA All-Star Game in 2023 as a reserve guard for the Eastern Conference, recording 18 points, three assists and a rebound. Haliburton and teammate Buddy Hield were selected to participate in the 2023 NBA Three-Point Contest, where they both lost in the finals to Damian Lillard. On March 5, Haliburton made his second game-winning three-pointer of the season in a 125–122 victory over the Chicago Bulls, finishing with 29 points on 11 of 17 field goals along with 11 assists. The next day against the Philadelphia 76ers, Haliburton posted his 30th double-double of the season with 39 points and 16 assists, becoming the first player in Pacers franchise history to record 30-plus points and 15-plus assists in a single game. On March 9, Haliburton scored 29 points while dishing out a career-high 19 assists in a 134–125 overtime victory over the Houston Rockets.

==== 2023–24: First All-NBA selection and Eastern Conference Finals ====
On July 1, 2023, Haliburton agreed to a maximum contract extension with the Pacers worth up to $260 million over five years. The same day, it was announced that Haliburton would represent the United States Men's National Team at the 2023 FIBA Basketball World Cup.

On November 4, Haliburton tied a then-career-high with 43 points and added 12 assists in a one-point loss to the Charlotte Hornets. He also became the first player in Pacers history to put up at least 40-plus points and 10-plus assists in a game. Two days later, Haliburton recorded 23 points and eight assists in a 41-point win over the San Antonio Spurs, giving head coach Rick Carlisle his 900th career win. On November 14, Haliburton recorded a near triple-double with 33 points, 15 assists, seven rebounds, and no turnovers in a 2023 in-season tournament win over Joel Embiid, Tyrese Maxey and the Philadelphia 76ers. He became just the 5th player in NBA history to have 30-plus points, 15-plus assists and no turnovers in a single game, joining John Stockton, Chris Paul, LeBron James and James Harden. He also became the first player in NBA history with 25-plus points, 15-plus assists and no turnovers in consecutive games since tracking began in 1977–78. On November 30, Haliburton scored a career-high 44 points along with 10 assists in a 142–132 loss against the Miami Heat. At the end of November, Haliburton joined Lebron James and Michael Jordan as the only players in league history to average at least 25 points and 10 assists per game while shooting 50 and 40 percent from the floor and three-point range, respectively, in a single month.

On December 4, Haliburton recorded his first career triple-double with 26 points, 10 rebounds, 13 assists and no turnovers in a 122–112 victory over the Boston Celtics. Three days later, Haliburton had 27 points, 15 assists and seven rebounds in a 128–119 victory in the semifinals of the NBA In-Season Tournament against the Milwaukee Bucks. On December 28, Haliburton recorded 20 points, a then-career-high 20 assists and zero turnovers in a 120–104 victory over the Chicago Bulls. He became just the second player in NBA history to record 20-plus points and 20-plus assists without a turnover, joining Chris Paul. Two days later, Haliburton scored 22 points and recorded a career-high 23 assists during a 140–126 win over the New York Knicks. He joined John Stockton and Magic Johnson as the only players in NBA history to record back-to-back 20-point and 20-assist games. His 23 assists also tied Jamaal Tinsley's Pacers franchise record for the most assists in a game.

On January 25, 2024, Haliburton was named an Eastern Conference starter for the 2024 NBA All-Star Game, in Indianapolis, marking his second consecutive selection and his first selection as a starter. On February 5, it was announced that Haliburton would return to participate in the 2024 NBA Three-Point Contest for the second consecutive season. During the All-Star Game, Haliburton scored 32 points and made 10 three-pointers, including a 29-footer in the fourth quarter in the Eastern Conference's 211–186 victory. Haliburton was two votes short of besting All-Star teammate Damian Lillard of the Milwaukee Bucks for the NBA All-Star Game MVP. On April 5, in a game against the Oklahoma City Thunder, Haliburton logged his 714th assist of the season, passing Mark Jackson for the most assists made in a season in Pacers franchise history. At the season's end, Haliburton was named to the All-NBA Third Team, his first career All-NBA selection.

On April 26, Haliburton logged a triple-double of 18 points, 10 rebounds and 16 assists, including a game-winning three-point play, in the Pacers' 121–118 overtime victory in Game 3 of the first round of the playoffs against the Milwaukee Bucks. In Game 3 of the Eastern Conference Semifinals against the New York Knicks, Haliburton scored a playoff career-high 35 points in a 111–106 victory. The Pacers defeated the Knicks in seven games to advance to the Eastern Conference Finals for the first time since 2014. In Game 2 of the Conference Finals, Haliburton suffered a hamstring injury and missed the rest of the series as the Pacers were swept by the Boston Celtics.

==== 2024–25: First Finals appearance ====
On November 10, 2024, Haliburton put up 35 points and 14 assists in a 132–121 victory over the New York Knicks. He and Bennedict Mathurin became the first duo to each score at least 35 points in a game in Pacers franchise history. On January 2, 2025, Haliburton recorded 33 points, a season-high 15 assists and zero turnovers in a 128–115 victory over the Miami Heat. He also became the first player in NBA history to have multiple games with at least 30 points and 15 assists with zero turnovers. On March 11, Haliburton converted a four-point play with three seconds remaining to give the Pacers a narrow 115–114 victory over the Milwaukee Bucks. On April 2, Haliburton recorded 22 points, 10 assists and zero turnovers in a 119–105 victory over the Charlotte Hornets. He also surpassed Chris Paul's previous record of 13 for the most games in NBA history with at least 20 points and 10 assists with zero turnovers. At the season's end, Haliburton was named to the All-NBA Third Team, his second consecutive All-NBA selection. Around the start of the 2025 NBA playoffs, The Athletic released its annual anonymous player survey, and Haliburton received the most votes among his peers for the distinction of the "Most Overrated Player."

On April 29, Haliburton recorded 26 points, five rebounds, nine assists, three steals, three blocks and the game-winning layup with 1.3 seconds left in overtime to seal the Pacers' narrow 119–118 victory over the Milwaukee Bucks and eliminate the Bucks in five games in the first round of the NBA playoffs. Exactly a week later, he scored 19 points, including 11 in the fourth quarter, and made a game-winning three-pointer in a narrow 120–119 come-from-behind victory over the Cleveland Cavaliers in Game 2 of the second round of the playoffs. On May 13, Haliburton had 31 points, six rebounds, and eight assists in a 114–105 closeout victory over the Cavaliers in Game 5, leading the Pacers to their second consecutive Eastern Conference Finals. Eight days later in Game 1 of the Eastern Conference Finals, Haliburton recorded 31 points and 11 assists, including a clutch jumper to force overtime, in the Pacers' 138–135 comeback victory over the New York Knicks. Haliburton notably made a choke gesture towards the crowd after hitting the game-tying shot, which he initially thought was a game-winning three-pointer, in reference to a similar gesture made by former Pacer Reggie Miller in game 5 of the 1994 Eastern Conference Finals. Miller was in the same building during the game as a commentator. In Game 4, Haliburton logged a triple-double of 32 points, 12 rebounds, and 15 assists in a 130–121 victory. He became the first player in playoff history to achieve 30+ points, 10+ rebounds, and 15+ assists with zero turnovers. Haliburton recorded 21 points, 11 of which coming from the fourth quarter, and 13 assists in Game 6 to help Indiana reach a 125–108 victory over the Knicks, granting him his first visit to the NBA Finals and the first appearance for the Pacers since 2000.

On June 5, in his NBA Finals debut, Haliburton posted a stat line of 14 points, 10 rebounds, and six assists, and scored a game-winning jumper with 0.3 seconds left, as the Pacers completed a 15-point comeback to win 111–110 against the Oklahoma City Thunder in Game 1 of the series. His go-ahead shot with 0.3 seconds left marked the latest game winner in an NBA Finals game since Michael Jordan's buzzer-beating shot in 1997. The following day on Get Up, ESPN sportswriter Brian Windhorst proclaimed that "Haliburton is unequivocally having the greatest run of clutch shooting we have seen in the history of the sport". In Game 3 of the Finals, Haliburton nearly tallied a triple-double with 22 points, nine rebounds and 11 assists in a 116–107 victory at home against the Thunder to gain a 2–1 lead in the series. He had a dismal performance in Game 5, however, scoring four points in 34 minutes and missing all of his field goal attempts in a loss against the Thunder. The performance was perhaps affected by a right calf strain that he aggravated in the first quarter. Following the game, he underwent an MRI exam to assess the injury, to which the medical professionals determined the strain to be a multi-week recovery. Despite this, he ultimately suited up for Game 6 of the series, helping the Pacers blow out the Thunder 108–91, and forcing a Game 7.

Haliburton got off to a hot start in the decisive seventh game, knocking down 3-of-4 three-pointers. However, with 4:55 left in the first quarter, he suffered what was confirmed the following day to be a torn right Achilles tendon. Indiana struggled turning the ball over without their star point guard facilitating their offense, which the Thunder took advantage of, leading to a 91–103 Pacers loss and Thunder championship win. Haliburton's injury was reminiscent of Kevin Durant's Achilles rupture during Game 5 of the 2019 NBA Finals, a game in which Durant made his return after missing nine games with a strained right calf. On June 23, following his surgery, Haliburton took to social media to share his positive outlook and to encourage fans, stating, "At 25, I've already learned that God never gives us more than we can handle. I know I'll come out on the other side of this a better man and a better player. And honestly, right now, torn Achilles and all, I don't regret it. I'd do it again, and again after that, to fight for this city and my brothers. For the chance to do something special."

==== 2025–26: Achilles injury recovery ====
On July 7, 2025, the Pacers announced that Haliburton would miss the entire 2025–26 season due to his Achilles injury. In Haliburton's absence, the Pacers dropped off significantly from the prior season, posting a 19–63 record and missing the playoffs.

==== 2026–27: Return from injury ====
On October 21, 2026, Haliburton made his return from injury, putting up 23 points and 12 assists in a 123–120 win over the New Orleans Pelicans. On October 28, after playing four games, Haliburton was ruled out for at least two weeks due to a left hamstring strain.

== National team career ==
Haliburton played for the United States at the 2019 FIBA Under-19 World Cup in Heraklion, Greece. On June 30, 2019, he scored a team-high 21 points, shooting 8-of-9 from the field, in a 102–84 group-stage win over Lithuania. Haliburton averaged 7.9 points and a tournament-leading 6.9 assists per game while shooting 69 percent from the field. He led the United States to a gold medal and was named to the all-tournament team's All-Star Five.

Haliburton was named to the 2021 USA Men's Select Team, working directly with the US Olympic Men's Basketball Team during training camp in Las Vegas, Nevada prior to the 2020 Tokyo Olympics. At the 2020 Olympics, the U.S. men's team was crowned champions for the 16th time.

Haliburton was selected to represent the United States Men's National Team at the 2023 FIBA Basketball World Cup in Pasay, Philippines, at Mall of Asia Arena. Across eight games, Haliburton averaged 8.6 points, 5.6 assists, three rebounds, 1.5 steals, 1.1 blocks, shooting 51% from the field and 47% from three-point range in 21.5 minutes per game off the bench. He led the team in steals and assists, helping the United States to a fourth-place finish that qualified the team for the 2024 Summer Olympics.

Haliburton was later named to the 2024 Olympic team. He made his first Olympic appearance during a preliminary round win against South Sudan, recording six points and an assist on 2-3 three point shooting. Team USA would go on to win the gold medal in a rematch against France.

== Player profile ==
Haliburton is a point guard who stands 6 feet 5 inches (1.96 m) tall and weighs 185 pounds (84 kg). Basketball writers have noted Haliburton as both an elite and high-volume three-point shooter. Despite this, Haliburton possesses a visually awkward shooting form described as "kooky" and "an almost embarrassing motion". Louisa Thomas of The New Yorker detailed Haliburton's ability to "skitter past" defenders, before jerking into a quick shot characterized by an "akimbo" right elbow set up by his use of "odd footwork, jabbing almost randomly".

Already the main distributor as his team's point guard, passing opportunities are further opened up for him due to his reputation as a perimeter threat. His Pacers teams, particularly in 2025, were known to play a considerably fast pace of play, with Haliburton directing their offense. In the 2025 NBA playoffs, after hitting multiple game-winning shots, analysts began to widely consider Haliburton as one of the most clutch players in the league.

== Awards and honors ==
NBA

- 2× NBA All-Star: 2023, 2024
- 2× All-NBA Third Team: 2024, 2025
- NBA Cup All-Tournament Team: 2023
- NBA All-Rookie First Team: 2021
- NBA assists leader: 2024

USA Basketball

- Olympics gold medalist: 2024
- FIBA Under-19 World Cup gold medalist: 2019
- FIBA Under-19 Basketball World Cup All-Tournament Team: 2019

== Career statistics ==
Legend
GP	Games played	GS	Games started	MPG	Minutes per game
FG%	Field goal percentage	3P%	3-point field goal percentage	FT%	Free throw percentage
RPG	Rebounds per game	APG	Assists per game	SPG	Steals per game
BPG	Blocks per game	PPG	Points per game	**Bold**	Career high
*	Led the league	‡	NBA record

=== NBA ===
==== Regular season ====
Year	Team	GP	GS	MPG	FG%	3P%	FT%	RPG	APG	SPG	BPG	PPG
2020–21	Sacramento	58	20	30.1	.472	.409	.857	3.0	5.3	1.3	.5	13.0
2021–22	Sacramento	51	51	34.4	.457	.413	.837	3.9	7.4	1.7	**.7**	14.3
2021–22	Indiana	26	26	**36.1**	**.502**	**.416**	.849	**4.3**	9.6	**1.8**	.6	17.5
2022–23	Indiana	56	56	33.6	.490	.400	**.871**	3.7	10.4	1.6	.4	**20.7**
2023–24	Indiana	69	68	32.2	.477	.364	.855	3.9	**10.9***	1.2	**.7**	20.1
2024–25	Indiana	**73**	**73**	33.6	.473	.388	.851	3.5	9.2	1.4	**.7**	18.6
Career		333	294	33.0	.477	.392	.855	3.7	8.8	1.5	.6	17.5
All-Star		2	1	20.5	.750	.700‡	—	4.0	4.5	.0	.0	25.0

==== Playoffs ====
Year	Team	GP	GS	MPG	FG%	3P%	FT%	RPG	APG	SPG	BPG	PPG
2024	Indiana	15	15	**34.8**	**.488**	**.379**	**.850**	4.8	8.2	**1.3**	**.7**	**18.7**
2025	Indiana	**23***	**23***	33.6	.463	.340	.828	**5.3**	**8.6**	**1.3**	**.7**	17.3
Career		38	38	34.1	.474	.358	.833	5.1	8.4	1.3	.7	17.9

=== College ===
Year	Team	GP	GS	MPG	FG%	3P%	FT%	RPG	APG	SPG	BPG	PPG
2018–19	Iowa State	**35**	**34**	33.2	**.515**	**.434**	.692	3.4	3.6	1.5	**.9**	6.8
2019–20	Iowa State	22	22	**36.7**	.504	.419	**.822**	**5.9**	**6.5**	**2.5**	.7	**15.2**
Career		57	56	34.6	.509	.426	.775	4.4	4.7	1.9	.8	10.1

== Personal life ==
Haliburton is a cousin of former basketball player Eddie Jones, who had a 14-year NBA career and was a three-time NBA All-Star. He is also the cousin of current Orlando Magic player Jalen Suggs. Haliburton has developed a friendship with Caitlin Clark, a fellow basketball player in the Indiana market; Clark plays for the WNBA's Indiana Fever.

Haliburton is a Christian. In 2024, he said, "My faith has grown a lot over the last year or two. Growing up we didn't go to church a lot, but we understood God's place in our lives. Now that I'm an adult I guess—I own a house now and live on my own—I go to church on Sunday every chance I can. I go to chapel before games."

Haliburton had been dating Jade Jones, who was a classmate of his and a cheerleader at Iowa State, since 2019. On July 28, 2025, it was announced that Haliburton and Jones got engaged. The couple married in July 2026.
