= 2022–23 Oklahoma City Thunder season =

- Head coach: Mark Daigneault
- General manager: Sam Presti
- Owners: Professional Basketball Club LLC; Clay Bennett (Chairman)
- Arena: Paycom Center

Results
- Record: 40–42 (.488)
- Place: Division: 3rd (Northwest); Conference: 10th (Western)
- Playoff finish: Did not qualify
- Stats at Basketball Reference

Local media
- Television: Bally Sports Oklahoma
- Radio: KWPN and WWLS-FM

The 2022–23 Oklahoma City Thunder season was the 15th season of the franchise in Oklahoma City and the 57th in the National Basketball Association (NBA).

== Previous season ==
The Thunder finished the 2021–22 season 24–58 to finish in fifth place in the Northwest Division, fourteenth in the Western Conference and failed to qualify for the playoffs. This marks the second consecutive season that the Thunder failed to qualify for the playoffs since moving to Oklahoma City.

In their second year of the rebuild, the Thunder started the season with 10 players aged 23 years or under. Throughout the season, the Thunder had numerous injuries to Shai Gilgeous-Alexander, Luguentz Dort, Josh Giddey, and Kenrich Williams. Playing without Gilgeous-Alexander, Giddey, and Williams, the Thunder were defeated by an NBA record 73-points in a 152–79 loss against the Memphis Grizzlies on December 2, 2021.

In his rookie season, Josh Giddey - the 6th pick in the 2021 NBA draft - recorded four triple-doubles including becoming the youngest ever to record one at 19 years and 84 days old. Before his season ending injury, Giddey had won four consecutive Western Conference Rookie of the Month and ultimately finished on the NBA All-Rookie Second Team.

The Thunder ended the 2021-22 season injury-riddled with nine players out in the final games. Utilizing their G League affiliate in the Oklahoma City Blue, the Thunder signed Melvin Frazier Jr., Jaylen Hoard, Georgios Kalaitzakis, and Zavier Simpson to finish out the season.

== Offseason ==
=== Draft picks ===
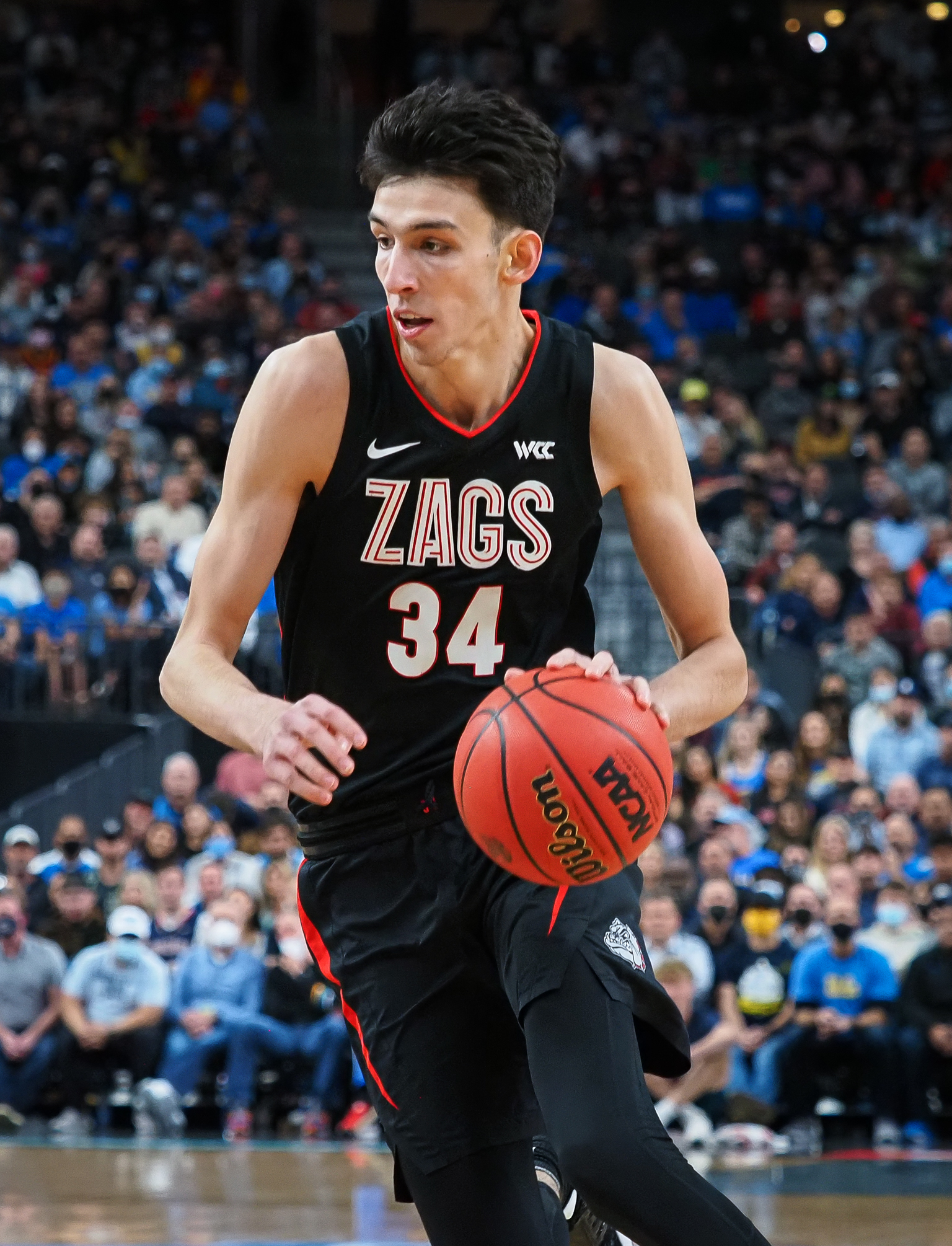
Chet Holmgren was selected 2nd overall by the Oklahoma City Thunder.

Round	Pick	Player	Position	Nationality	College
1	2	Chet Holmgren	PF	United States	Gonzaga
1	12	Jalen Williams	SG	United States	Santa Clara
1	30	Peyton Watson	PF	United States	UCLA
2	34	Jaylin Williams	C	United States	Arkansas
Ousmane Dieng was later traded to the Thunder via New York Knicks

The Thunder had three first-round picks and one second-round pick entering the draft. The Thunder owned two first-round picks entering the 2022 NBA draft lottery. Their sole first-round pick had a 12.50% chance to win the first overall pick while the pick originally acquired from the Los Angeles Clippers had a 1.50% chance to win the first pick, acquired through the Paul George trade in 2019. With a combined 14.0% chance to win the first overall pick, the Thunder ended the night with the second overall pick, via their sole first-round pick, and the twelfth overall pick, via the Clippers. The Thunder's other first-round pick ended up as the thirtieth pick originally acquired from the Phoenix Suns as a result of the Chris Paul trade in 2020.

On draft night, the Thunder traded three protected 2023 first-round draft picks to the New York Knicks in exchange for the draft rights to Ousmane Dieng, the eleventh pick. With the thirtieth pick, the Thunder selected and traded the draft rights to Peyton Watson to the Denver Nuggets in the JaMychal Green trade.

The Thunder ended 2022 NBA draft night with Gonzaga forward Chet Holmgren, Australia's NBL forward Ousmane Dieng, Santa Clara guard Jalen Williams, and Arkansas forward Jaylin Williams.

=== Trades ===
On June 23, the Thunder traded the draft rights to Peyton Watson, the thirtieth pick, and two future second-round draft picks to the Denver Nuggets in exchange for JaMychal Green and a future 2027 first-round pick. On July 20, the Thunder negotiated a contract buyout and waived Green. In return, Green gave up $2.6 million in his buyout.

On September 27, the Thunder traded Vít Krejčí to the Atlanta Hawks in exchange for Maurice Harkless and draft considerations in an effort to clear a roster spot. The Thunder received a 2029 second-round pick and amendments on the conditions of a previously traded 2025 second-round pick which will be now top-40 protected.

On September 30, the Thunder traded Derrick Favors, Maurice Harkless, Ty Jerome, Théo Maledon, a 2026 second-round pick and cash considerations to the Houston Rockets in exchange for Sterling Brown, Trey Burke, Marquese Chriss and David Nwaba. Jerome did not report to training camp after a mutual agreement with the Thunder and Jerome's representatives. With the trade, the Thunder generated two trade exceptions and dropped approximately $10 million under the luxury tax. On October 2, the Thunder waived Sterling Brown after acquiring him two days ago. On October 17, the Thunder waived Trey Burke, Marquese Chriss, and David Nwaba to finalize the regular season roster.

=== Free agency ===
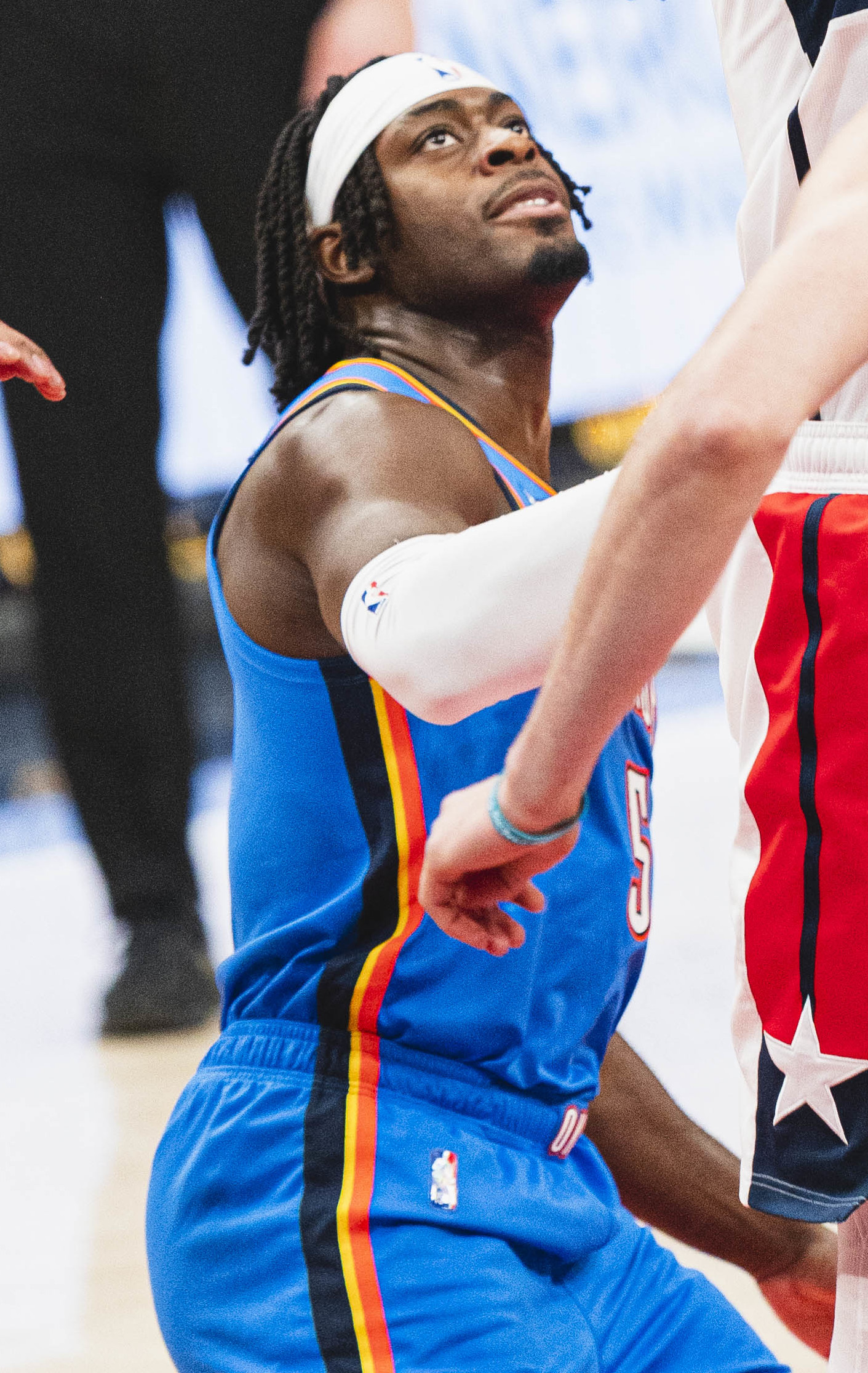
Luguentz Dort was re-signed to a multi-year contract.

For this offseason, free agency began on June 30, 2022, at 6:00 p.m. EST. Derrick Favors, Mike Muscala, Luguentz Dort, Isaiah Roby had upcoming player and team options. In addition, Théo Maledon, Vít Krejčí, Aaron Wiggins, and Kenrich Williams held non-guaranteed contracts with the team heading into next season. Melvin Frazier Jr. also held a two-way contract that expired this season. On May 17, Derrick Favors exercised his player option for $10.2 million. On June 29, the Thunder declined Mike Muscala's team option for $3.5 million and exercised Isaiah Roby's team option for $1.9 million. However, on July 3, the Thunder waived Roby as his salary would have become fully guaranteed after exercising his team option. On June 30, it was reported that Luguentz Dort agreed to a five-year, $87.5 million deal to stay with the Thunder, which he later signed on July 6. Dort and the Thunder negotiated the new deal after his team option for $1.9 million was declined. On July 18, it was reported that Kenrich Williams signed a multi-year contract extension worth four-year, $27.2 million, which he later signed on July 20. On August 4, the Thunder re-signed Mike Muscala to a two-year, $7 million deal after his team option was declined on June 30. On October 26, it was announced that Melvin Frazier Jr. joined the Raptors 905 for the upcoming season.

On July 2, Eugene Omoruyi signed a two-way contract with the Thunder, splitting time with the Thunder and Oklahoma City Blue. Omoruyi spent part of the 2021-22 NBA season on a previous two-way contract with the Dallas Mavericks. On October 16, Isaiah Joe signed a contract with the Thunder after being waived by the Philadelphia 76ers.

=== Front office and coaching changes ===
On July 27, the Thunder hired Chip Engelland, formerly with the San Antonio Spurs, as an assistant coach. Engelland is considered one of the NBA's preeminent shooting coach and has been one of the league's highest-paid assistant coaches. Sam Presti and Engelland previously worked together with the Spurs organization in the mid-2000s. On July 27, the Thunder hired Vince Rozman, formerly with the Philadelphia 76ers in scouting as VP of Identification and Intelligence. Rozman spent over 15-plus years with the 76ers.

On September 23, the Thunder announced Grant Gibbs will join the Thunder coaching staff after serving as head coach of the Oklahoma City Blue for the past three seasons. In addition, Thunder assistant Kameron Woods was named the new head coach of the Blue. Woods previously played for the Blue for two seasons and served as the head coach of the Thunder during the 2022 NBA Summer League.

== Season synopsis ==
=== Preseason ===
The Thunder announced their preseason schedule on August 25. The Thunder played six games, with three games in Oklahoma, two games against international opponents. That same day, the Thunder announced Chet Holmgren will miss the entire season after sustaining a fracture in his right foot during a Pro-Am event. The Thunder opened their preseason opener against the Denver Nuggets on October 3. Tre Mann led the Thunder with 17 points while Aaron Wiggins scored 15 points on a perfect 4-4 from three off the bench in a 112–101 win. Against the Adelaide 36ers on October 6, the Thunder led by as many as 40 points as Mann and Lindy Waters III combined for 14 threes in a 131–98 rout. The Thunder topped their performance against the 36ers with a 144–97 victory over Maccabi Ra'anana leading by as many as 51 points. Eight Thunder players scored in double digits led by Eugene Omoruyi's 25 points. The Thunder ended preseason with a 5–1 record with their single loss against the Dallas Mavericks.

=== Regular season ===
==== October ====
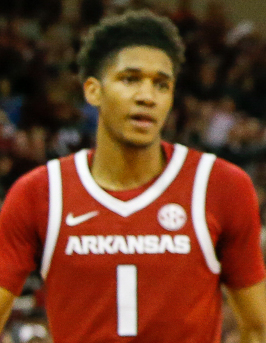
Isaiah Joe scored 15 points in 9 minutes in an OT victory against the Mavericks.

The Thunder began their 15th season since the franchise moved to Oklahoma City against the Minnesota Timberwolves on October 19. Shai Gilgeous-Alexander, who missed all of preseason, led the Thunder with 32 points. The Thunder trailed by as many as 16-points until a late rally turned into a six-point lead for the Thunder. However the Thunder could not keep the lead, losing 108–115 in their season opener. Rookie guard Jalen Williams took a hit defending a dunk attempt by Jaden McDaniels and left the game, ending his rookie debut with five points in five minutes. The Thunder again faced the Timberwolves for the home opener on October 23. The Thunder never led and trailed by as many as 22-points falling to 0–3 on the season in a 106–116 loss.

In a back-to-back against the Los Angeles Clippers, on October 25, Gilgeous-Alexander and Tre Mann led the Thunder to their first win of the season with 33 points and 25 points respectively. In the second game on October 27, the Thunder led by as many as 18 points to a 118–110 win against the Clippers for their second win of the season. Back on the road, on October 29 against the Dallas Mavericks, the Thunder erased an eight-point deficit in the final two minutes of regulation in a 117–111 overtime victory. OKC trailed by as many as 16-points headed into the fourth quarter until the Thunder came back behind Gilgeous-Alexander and Isaiah Joe. Joe, a late signing after being waived by the 76ers, started the fourth quarter comeback by hitting a pair of free throws and a jumper to cut the lead to six. After two Gilgeous-Alexander jumpers, Joe hit a three-pointer to send the game into overtime with 15.8 seconds left in the fourth. Joe later scored 8 of his 15 points in the overtime period giving the Thunder a 117–111 win and their first road victory. On October 31, Gilgeous-Alexander was named the NBA Player of the Week for Week 2 after averaging 31.7 points, 5.3 rebounds, and 7.7 assists.

==== November ====
After being named NBA Player of the Week, Gilgeous-Alexander scored 34 points to lead the Thunder after being down 15 points in the second half to a 116–108 win against the Orlando Magic. With a 4–3 record, the Thunder had a winning record for the first time since nine games into the 2020-21 season. In a double overtime thriller on November 9, Gilgeous-Alexander scored 39 points including a step-back three-pointer with 0.6 seconds left in the first overtime giving the Thunder a 126–125 lead. However, Luguentz Dort fouled Brook Lopez on an inbounds lob where Lopez made 1-of-2 free throws. The Thunder ended up losing 132–136 extending their losing streak to four games. Coming off a double overtime game, on November 11, two-way contract player Eugene Omoruyi scored a career-high 22 points to defeat the Toronto Raptors 132–113 after leading by as much as 32 points. Against the New York Knicks on November 12, Gilgeous-Alexander scored 37 points, Josh Giddey recorded 24 points, 10 rebounds, and 12 assists as the Thunder shot a season-high 62.5% in a 145–135 win. Giddey joined Wilt Chamberlain as the only player in NBA history to record triple-doubles in their first two appearances at Madison Square Garden. On November 16, trailing by as much as 17, Gilgeous-Alexander scored 30 in the second half as he matched his career high with 42 points with a step-back three-pointer with 1.1 seconds left as the Thunder defeated the Washington Wizards 121–120. In their third meeting with the Denver Nuggets, the Thunder rallied from a 19-point deficit to take a 15-point lead in the second half before falling 126–131 in overtime. Isaiah Joe almost played heroics again with a career-high 21 points with 7 threes, including a late three in overtime after a jump ball scramble. With Gilgeous-Alexander sidelined with a bruised hip, rookie Jalen Williams scored a career-high 27 points rallying the Thunder from a 20-point second half deficit to win 119–111 against the San Antonio Spurs on November 30. The next day, Williams was named NBA Rookie of the Month for October/November after averaging 10.7 points on 52.4% shooting, 3.2 rebounds, and 2.6 assists. Williams became the third Thunder rookie to win Rookie of the Month honors after Russell Westbrook and Josh Giddey.

==== December ====
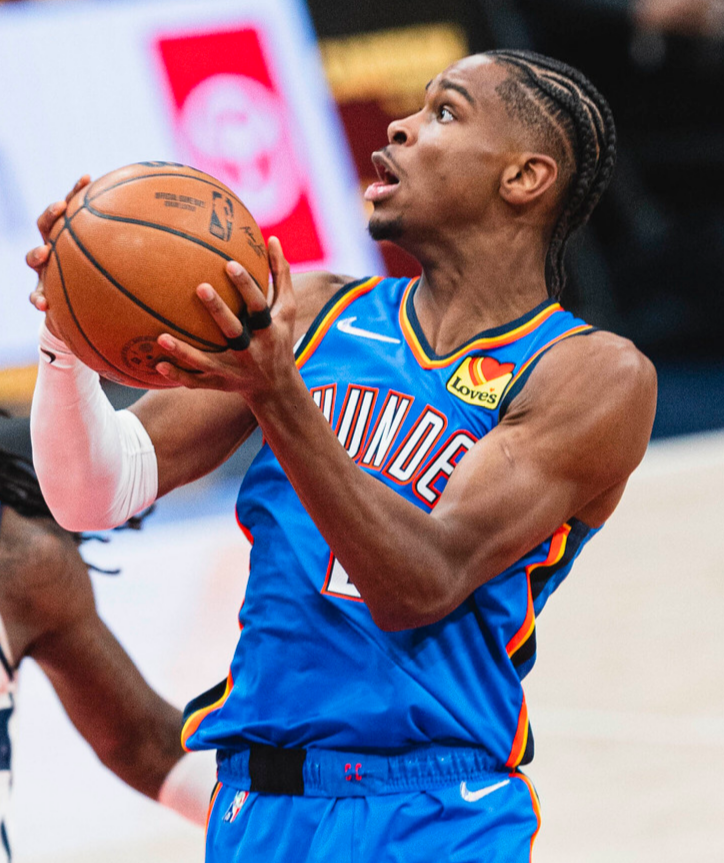
Shai Gilgeous-Alexander hit a game winner at the buzzer against the Trail Blazers.

The Thunder started their longest road trip of the season against the Minnesota Timberwolves on December 3. On their second game of the road trip against the Atlanta Hawks, the Thunder overcame a 14-point deficit in the third to win 121–114. This was the Thunder's first win in Atlanta since the 2017-18 season. Trips to Memphis, Cleveland and Dallas saw the Thunder finish the road trip 2–3 with narrow losses to the Cavaliers and Mavericks. Back at Paycom Center, the Thunder then started their longest home stand with seven straight games. Playing without Shai Gilgeous-Alexander and Josh Giddey, the Thunder led by as many as 24-points against the top-seeded Memphis Grizzlies on December 17 with Luguentz Dort's 24 points Isaiah Joe's career-high 23 points in a 115–109 win. In the first back-to-back against the Portland Trail Blazers, Gilgeous-Alexander hit a game winner at the buzzer over Justise Winslow to finish with 35 points on December 19. Coming off back-to-back wins against the Trail Blazers, Gilgeous-Alexander scored a career-high 44 points to go with 10 rebounds and six assists in an overtime loss to the New Orleans Pelicans. Gilgeous-Alexander nearly sent the game into double overtime after a missed free throw rebound caromed toward halfcourt. During a 130–114 win against the San Antonio Spurs, Giddey became the second-youngest NBA player to reach 1,000 points, 500 rebounds and 500 assists, behind only LeBron James. The Thunder bench also scored a season-high 68 points marking the second most bench points in Thunder history.

==== January ====
Playing without Shai Gilgeous-Alexander, the Thunder scored a season-high 150 points in a 150–117 win over the then-best record Boston Celtics on January 3. The Thunder's 150 points and 48 in the third quarter were franchise highs as well as seven Thunder players scoring in double-figures led by Josh Giddey with 25 points, five rebounds and five assists in 24 minutes. On January 10 against the Miami Heat, the Thunder played on national TV - excluding NBA TV - for the first time since the 2020 NBA Playoffs on TNT. The Heat, led by Jimmy Butler, set an NBA record making all 40 free throws in a 112–111 win over the Thunder. Against the 76ers, the Thunder snapped their six-game road losing streak after leading by as much as 21 to a 133–114 win. Gilgeous-Alexander had 37 points including a career-perfect 16-16 from the free throw line. Rookie Jaylin Williams also contributed with a career-high 11 points in his fourth start of his career. In their third game in four nights, the Thunder swept the season series against the Chicago Bulls behind Giddey's season-high 25 points. Rookie Jalen Williams also added 22 points on an efficient 10-12 shooting. To finish the four game road trip, Giddey tied his career-high 28 points along with 9 rebounds and 9 assists in a 112–102 win against the Brooklyn Nets. Returning home, the Thunder recorded a franchise-high 41 assists in a 126–106 rout against the Indiana Pacers on January 18. Against the then-best record in the west Denver Nuggets, Gilgeous-Alexander banked in the decisive game-winner with 9.2 seconds left in a 101–99 win. On January 31, Josh Giddey and Jalen Williams were named to the 2023 Rising Stars Challenge. In 45 games, Giddey averaged 16.1 points, 8.0 rebounds and 5.7 assists. Giddey's assists ranked second among sophomores. In 46 games, Williams averaged 12.1 points, 3.9 rebounds, 2.8 assists and 1.7 steals. Giddey and Williams became the 12th and 13th players in Thunder history to be named to a Rising Stars team.

==== February ====
On February 2, Shai Gilgeous-Alexander was named a 2023 NBA All-Star reserve for the first time. In 47 games, Gilgeous-Alexander averaged 30.8 points, 4.8 rebounds, 5.6 assists, 1.6 steals and 1.1 blocks, leading the Thunder to a 24–27 record. Gilgeous-Alexander scored 30-plus points in 30 games this season, ranking second this season. He leads the league with 434 made free throws and sixth in the league with 101 points scored in clutch time. Gilgeous-Alexander joins Kevin Durant, Russell Westbrook, Paul George, and Chris Paul as the fifth Thunder player to be named an All-Star since the franchise moved to Oklahoma City. In his first game after being named an All-Star, Gilgeous-Alexander scored a career-high 20 first quarter points in a 153–121 rout against the Houston Rockets. The Thunder set a new franchise record 153 points after previously setting an Oklahoma City-high 150 points. The Thunder ended with six players in double-figures scoring led by Gilgeous-Alexander's 42 points. On February 7, the Thunder had their second national TV game on TNT against the Los Angeles Lakers. LeBron James passed Kareem Abdul-Jabbar as the all-time scoring leader on a fadeaway shot against Kenrich Williams. Despite James' record breaking night, the Thunder won 133–130 behind Shai Gilgeous-Alexander's 30 points and Jalen Williams's 25 points.

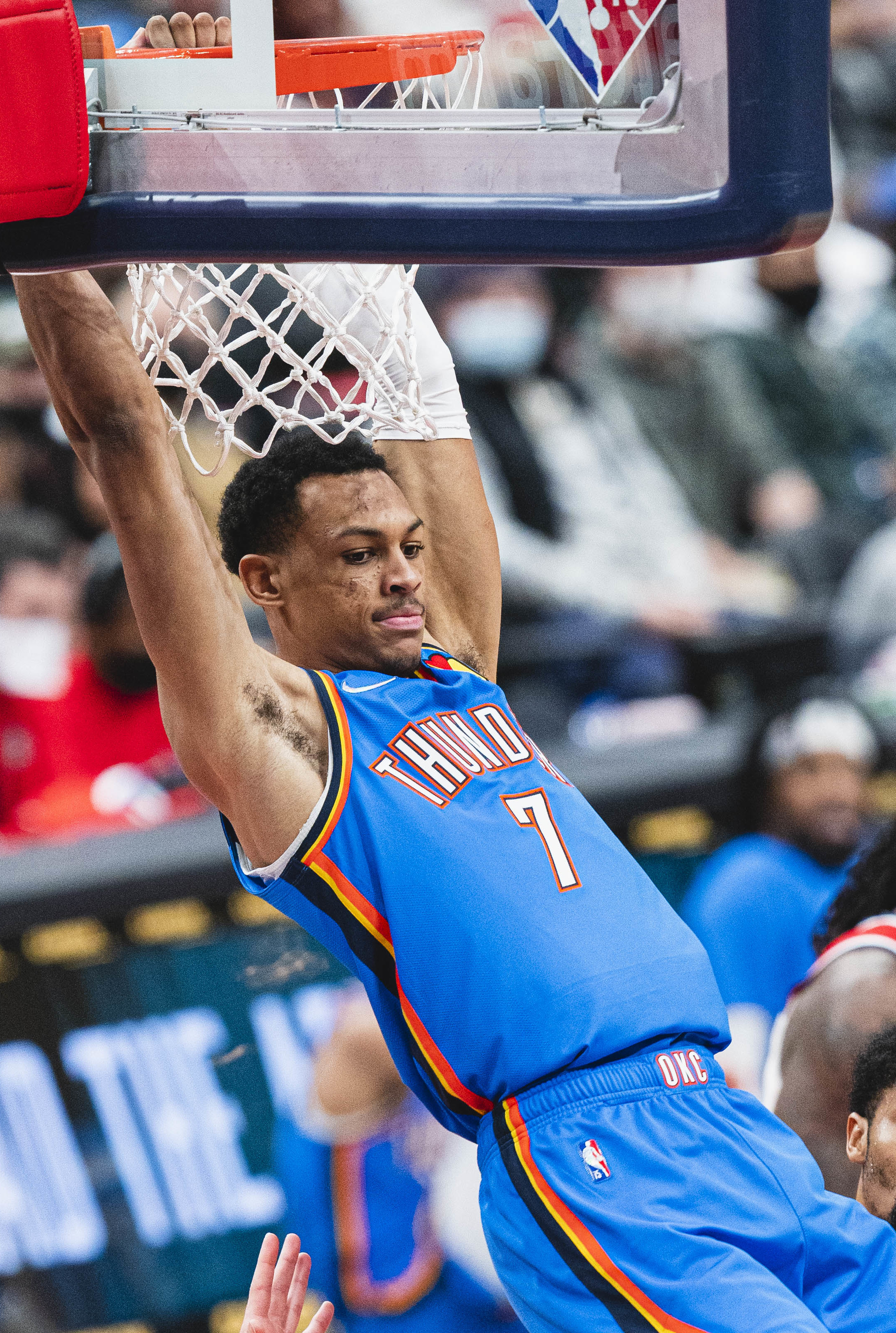
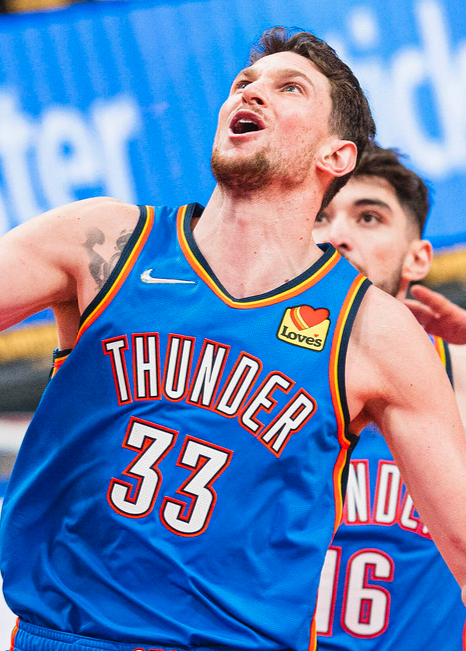
Darius Bazley and Mike Muscala were traded after four years with the Thunder.

At the NBA trade deadline, the Thunder completed two trades with the Boston Celtics and the Phoenix Suns. The Thunder traded Mike Muscala to the Boston Celtics in exchange for Justin Jackson and two second-round picks. Muscala, who re-signed with the Thunder this offseason, averaged 6.2 points on 39.4% three-point shooting in 43 games. Jackson, who played for the Thunder during the 2020-21 season, was waived following the trade. Muscala's departure allowed the Thunder to prioritize more playing time for Jeremiah Robinson-Earl, Jaylin Williams and Ousmane Dieng, in addition to Chet Holmgren next season. The Thunder also traded Darius Bazley to the Phoenix Suns in exchange for Dario Šarić, a second-round pick, and cash considerations. Bazley's role decreased with the Thunder this year after averaging 10.8 points in the 2021-22 season to 5.4 points in 36 games this season. Šarić joins the Thunder after recovering from a torn ACL and missing the entire 2021-22 season averaging 5.8 points and 3.8 rebounds this season. After waiving Justin Jackson, the Thunder converted Eugene Omoruyi's two-way contract to a standard contract extending through the 2023–24 season. Omoruyi became the fifth Thunder player to have their two-way converted into a standard contract, joining Deonte Burton, Luguentz Dort, Moses Brown, and Aaron Wiggins. To fill in the open two-way slot, the Thunder signed Olivier Sarr who spent part of the 2021-22 season with the Thunder. Sarr rejoined the Oklahoma City Blue in January after being waived by the Portland Trail Blazers.

On February 10, Shai Gilgeous-Alexander tied his career high with 44 points in a 138–129 win over the Portland Trail Blazers. Gilgeous-Alexander shot 81% from field along with 18 of 19 from the free throw line becoming the first player in franchise history to record 40+ points on 80% or better from the field. Gilgeous-Alexander was later named the NBA Player of the Week for Week 17 - his second - after averaging 31.3 points, 6.3 assists on 57.1% shooting. At the 2023 NBA All-Star Jordan Rising Stars Challenge, Josh Giddey and Jalen Williams were both selected for Team Joakim. Against Team Jason, Giddey had a team high 6 assists while Williams had a team high 5 rebounds in a 40–32 win. In the championship final, Team Joakim lost 20–25 to Team Pau. At 2023 NBA All-Star Game, Shai Gilgeous-Alexander was selected fifth overall in the reserves to Team Giannis. In his first All-Star game, Gilgeous-Alexander had 9 points and 7 assists in 10 minutes as Team Giannis defeated Team LeBron 184–175.

Without Shai Gilgeous-Alexander, Isaiah Joe started and scored a career-high 28 points on 6-12 three-point shooting in a 125–115 loss to the Phoenix Suns on February 24. On February 26, the Thunder waived Eugene Omoruyi sixteen days after re-signing to a multi-year contract. Omoruyi started off on a two-way contract before re-signing to a standard contract following the departures of Darius Bazley and Mike Muscala. Omoruyi appeared in 21 games averaging 5.0 points and 2.3 rebounds in 12.2 minutes. The Thunder opted for a free roster spot and decided between waiving Omoruyi or Dario Šarić. By converting Omoruyi's contract into a standard, the Thunder gave Omoruyi a pay bump prior to inevitably being waived. To fill in the open roster spot, the Thunder converted Lindy Waters III's two-way contract to a standard contract. Waters III became the sixth Thunder player to have their two-way contract converted into a standard contract.

==== March ====
On March 2, the Thunder announced Kenrich Williams will miss the rest of the season after sustaining a scapholunate ligament rupture in his left wrist after a 123–117 loss to the Sacramento Kings. In his third season with the Thunder, Williams appeared in 53 games averaging 8.0 points on 51.7% from the field, 4.9 rebounds and 2.0 assists in 22.8 minutes. Williams also led the league during that time with 26 charges drawn. After Lindy Waters III's two-way contract was converted into a standard contract, the Thunder signed Jared Butler to a two-way contract. Butler spent the beginning of the season with the Grand Rapids Gold in the NBA G League averaging 18.0 points and 5.7 assists in 41 games after being waived by the Utah Jazz prior to the season. Against the Utah Jazz, the Thunder had their eighth game this season with three players scoring more than 20 points. Coming back from injury, Shai Gilgeous-Alexander scored 38 points, Jalen Williams had a career high 32 points on 12-15 shooting, and Josh Giddey had 24 points, 9 rebounds, and 9 assists in a 129–119 win. Against the Golden State Warriors on March 7, the Thunder snapped their eight-game losing streak to Golden State. Seven Thunder players scored in double-figures led by Shai Gilgeous-Alexander's 33 points. Additionally, Josh Giddey recorded his seventh career triple-double with 17 points, 11 rebounds and a career high 17 assists and Jaylin Williams scored a career high 15 points. On March 19, the Thunder came back down 15 against the Phoenix Suns to win 124–120. After not playing the entire game, Aaron Wiggins lead an 18–2 run in the fourth quarter with 7 points and 2 steals while playing the whole quarter. Gilgeous-Alexander led the Thunder with 40 points while Luguentz Dort had 11 of his 20 points in the third quarter. In the first of a back-to-back against the Los Angeles Clippers, Luguentz Dort defended Kawhi Leonard on the final possession and kept Leonard from getting a shot off before the clock expired to give the Thunder a 101–100 win. After losing in the second game of a back-to-back with the Clippers, the Thunder fell to the Los Angeles Lakers despite Josh Giddey's 27 points, 17 rebounds, and 7 assist performance in a 116–111 loss dropping the Thunder for 10th in the West after climbing up to 7th. Without Gilgeous-Alexander, Isaiah Joe, Jalen Williams, and Josh Giddey combined for 95 points in a 137–134 loss to the Charlotte Hornets. Joe, who started for Gilgeous-Alexander, had career-high 33 points with 6 threes. Williams was one point shy of his career-high had 31 points and 4 steals. Giddey finished with a career-high 31 points, 10 rebounds, and 9 assists however he missed a game-tying free throw with 4.0 seconds left.

External videos
- Jalen Williams' Putback Game Winner, Oklahoma City Thunder's official YouTube channel. March 29, 2023.

After falling two games under .500 following the loss to the Hornets, the Thunder defeated the Detroit Pistons behind Jalen Williams' putback with less than a second in a 107–106 win after Josh Giddey's hook shot rolled off. With Gilgeous-Alexander sitting again, Williams led the Thunder with 27 points, 8 rebounds, and 6 assists. Williams also joined Kevin Durant and Russell Westbrook to have three or more games with at least 25 points, 5 rebounds, and 5 assists in a season as a rookie.

==== April ====
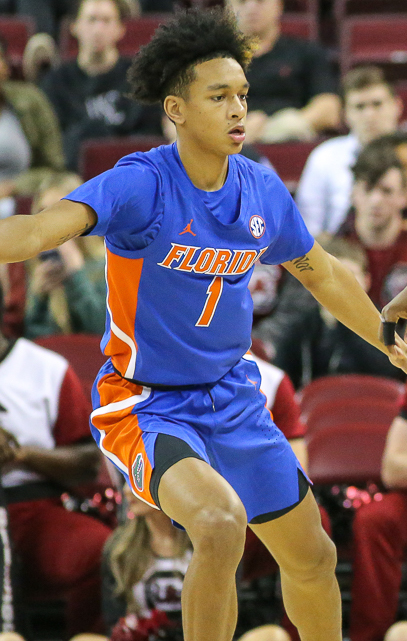
Tre Mann recorded his first career-triple double with 24 points, 12 rebounds, and 12 assists against the Grizzlies.

Entering the final month of the season, the Thunder had a 38–40 record, sitting in the final spot of the NBA play-in tournament holding the tiebreaker against the 37–40 Dallas Mavericks. The Thunder held two more home and away games in the month of April against the Phoenix Suns, Golden State Warriors, Utah Jazz, and Memphis Grizzlies. Against the Phoenix Suns on April 2, the Thunder fell 128–118 despite Shai Gilgeous-Alexander's 39 points. In the second half, the Thunder rallied down 16 points to cut the lead to 3 before back-to-back threes by Kevin Durant. The Thunder started their final road trip against the Golden State Warriors and the Utah Jazz. In their final meeting, the Thunder held the lead until the 8:29 mark of the fourth quarter. Shai Gilgeous-Alexander scored 32 points, 21 in the first half however the Thunder fell 136–125, losing their third in a row and fourth of five. Despite the Thunder's losing streak, the Thunder remained in 10th place after the Dallas Mavericks lost seventh of nine. In the final road game of the season, the Thunder defeated the Utah Jazz 114–98, going on a 19–2 run bridging the third and fourth quarter to take control. With Gilgeous-Alexander struggling, Josh Giddey had 17 points, 8 rebounds, and 8 assists, Aaron Wiggins added 15 points and 3 steals. Dario Šarić also had his first double-double with the Thunder with 14 points and 10 rebounds. With the win, the Thunder were guaranteed to reach the NBA play-in tournament by defeating the Memphis Grizzlies in the final regular season game. On April 7, the Dallas Mavericks announced that Kyrie Irving, Tim Hardaway Jr., Josh Green, Maxi Kleber, and Christian Wood would sit out against the Chicago Bulls, a game that Dallas had to win to avoid being eliminated from the NBA play-in tournament scenario. Dallas was tied with the Bulls for the 10th-best lottery odds and would have conveyed their first-round pick to the New York Knicks had it fallen out of the top-10. With Luka Dončić only playing 13 minutes, the Mavericks were officially eliminated from play-in contention following a 115–112 loss to the Chicago Bulls, giving the Thunder the final play-in spot. After clinching a play-in spot, the Thunder rested Shai Gilgeous-Alexander, Josh Giddey, Luguentz Dort, Jalen Williams, and Jaylin Williams in the final regular season game against the Memphis Grizzlies. Playing only seven players, all five starters played more than 40 minutes led by Tre Mann in a 115–100 win over the Memphis Grizzlies. Mann recorded his first career triple-double with 24 points, 12 rebounds, and 12 assists. Jared Butler had a career-high 25 points while Ousmane Dieng also recorded a career-high 22 points, 8 rebounds, and a career-high 9 assists. With the win, the Thunder finished the 2022-23 season with a 40–42 record, finishing tenth in the Western Conference and third in the Northwest Division.

=== Play-in ===
==== New Orleans Pelicans ====
With a 40–42 record, the Thunder finished tenth in the Western Conference and clinched the final spot in the NBA play-in tournament. The Thunder matched up against the ninth seed New Orleans Pelicans in the 9/10 matchup. The Pelicans won the season series against the Thunder, winning 3 out of 4 games. In the Thunder's three losses, the Thunder lost by a combined 10-points with two 3-point losses. Against the Pelicans, Shai Gilgeous-Alexander averaged a team-high 33.5 points, 8.0 rebounds, 4.3 assists and 2.3 steals a game. Gilgeous-Alexander also tied his career-high with 44 points in a December 23 matchup.

Season series

November 28

Recap

Oklahoma City Thunder 101, New Orleans Pelicans 105
Pts: Shai Gilgeous-Alexander 31	Pts: Zion Williamson 23

Smoothie King Center, New Orleans, Louisiana

December 23

Recap

New Orleans Pelicans 128, Oklahoma City Thunder 125
Pts: Trey Murphy III 23	Pts: Shai Gilgeous-Alexander 44

Paycom Center, Oklahoma City, Oklahoma

February 13

Recap

New Orleans Pelicans 103, Oklahoma City Thunder 100
Pts: Brandon Ingram 34	Pts: Shai Gilgeous-Alexander 24

Paycom Center, Oklahoma City, Oklahoma

March 11

Recap

Oklahoma City Thunder 110, New Orleans Pelicans 96
Pts: Shai Gilgeous-Alexander 35	Pts: CJ McCollum 26

Smoothie King Center, New Orleans, Louisiana

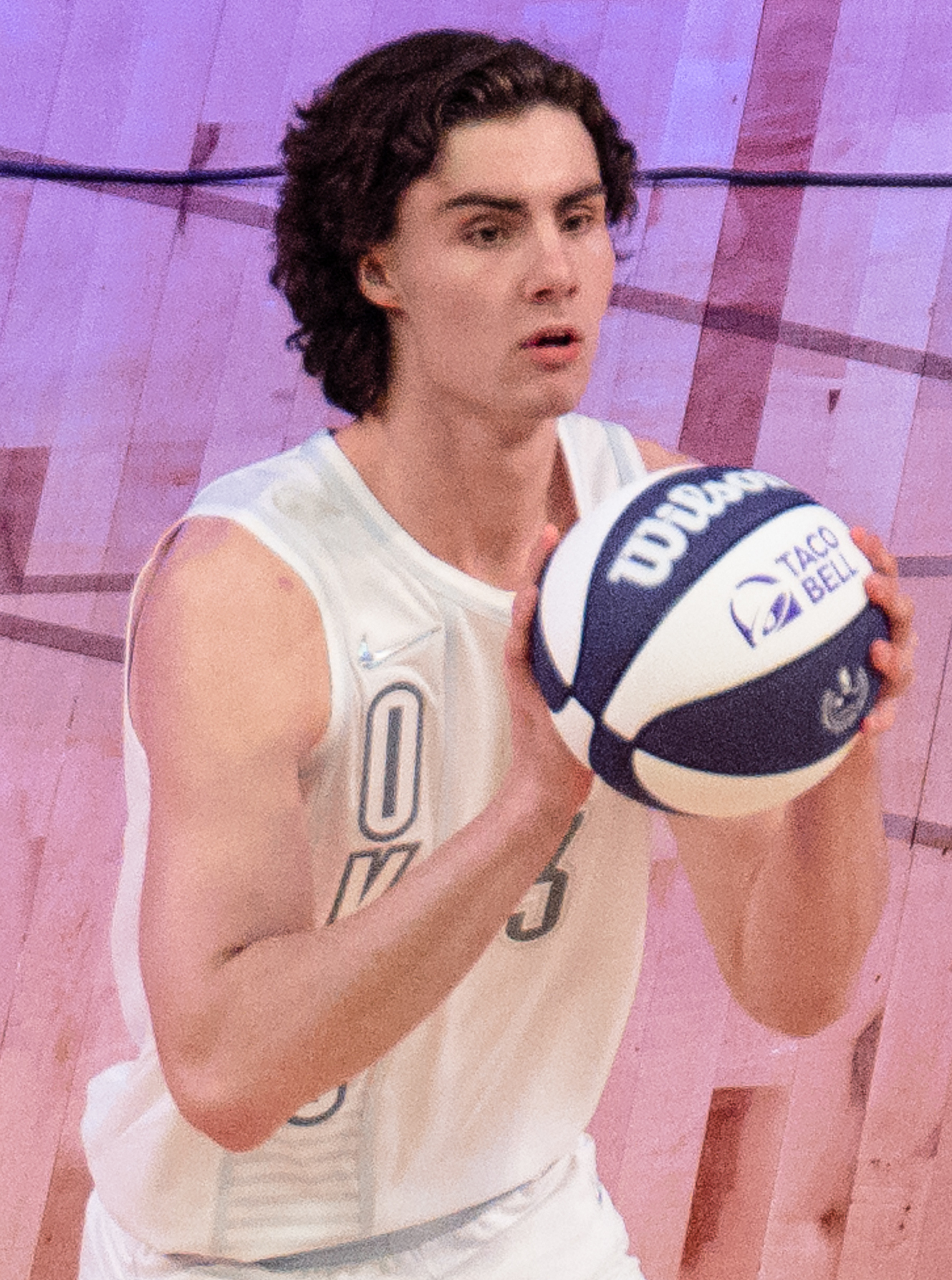
Josh Giddey had 31 points, 9 rebounds, and 10 assists against the Pelicans.

The Thunder kept the same starting lineup of Shai Gilgeous-Alexander, Jalen Williams, Josh Giddey, Luguentz Dort, and Jaylin Williams against the Pelicans who were without Zion Williamson. Pelicans center Jonas Valančiūnas started the game with 6 early points off second chance points to give the Pelicans an early 19–10 lead. However, Luguentz Dort kept the Thunder in the game with 14 points in the first quarter to give the Thunder a three-point lead. In the second, the Thunder and the Pelicans continued to exchange baskets until a late run gave the Pelicans a 63–57 halftime lead. At halftime, Shai Gilgeous-Alexander had his lowest-scoring first half with only 7 points on 3–10 shooting due to Herbert Jones's tenacious defense. To start the third quarter, Gilgeous-Alexander scored 17 points while Josh Giddey added 12 points and 5 assists as the Thunder outscored the Pelicans 39–24 to give the Thunder a 9-point lead entering the fourth. Despite the lead, the Pelicans took the lead at the 7:59 mark off a Josh Richardson dunk with Gilgeous-Alexander on the bench. After double timeouts from both teams at the 3:12 mark, Brandon Ingram made consecutive pullup jumpers after the Thunder continued to tie the game. After Jaylin Williams made 1–of–2 free throws, CJ McCollum missed a floater gave the Thunder a chance to take the lead down 114–113. Gilgeous-Alexander drove into the paint with Jones on him and made a shot over Jones to give the Thunder a 115–114 lead. After a series of free throws including a made three by Ingram to cut the lead to one with 4.1 seconds, CJ McCollum and Herbert Jones turned over the ball while inbounding securing a 123–118 win for the Thunder. The Thunder won its first play-in game and advanced to face the Minnesota Timberwolves for the final spot in the 2023 NBA playoffs. Gilgeous-Alexander led the Thunder with 32 points, scoring 25 points in the second half. Josh Giddey had a near triple-double with 31 points, 9 rebounds, and 10 assists while Luguentz Dort added 27 points with four threes.

==== Minnesota Timberwolves ====
After defeating the New Orleans Pelicans, the Thunder matched up against the eighth seed Minnesota Timberwolves who lost to the seventh seed Los Angeles Lakers in the 7/8 matchup. The Timberwolves won the season series against the Thunder, also winning 3 out of 4 games. The Thunder's sole victory was in a December 3 matchup when Timberwolves center Rudy Gobert was ejected for intentionally tripping Kenrich Williams with Timberwolves center Karl-Anthony Towns injured.

Season series

October 19

Recap

Oklahoma City Thunder 108, Minnesota Timberwolves 115
Pts: Shai Gilgeous-Alexander 32	Pts: Rudy Gobert 23

Target Center, Minneapolis, Minnesota

October 23

Recap

Minnesota Timberwolves 116, Oklahoma City Thunder 106
Pts: Anthony Edwards 30	Pts: Luguentz Dort 20

Paycom Center, Oklahoma City, Oklahoma

December 3

Recap

Oklahoma City Thunder 135, Minnesota Timberwolves 128
Pts: Shai Gilgeous-Alexander 33	Pts: D'Angelo Russell 27

Target Center, Minneapolis, Minnesota

December 16

Recap

Minnesota Timberwolves 112, Oklahoma City Thunder 110
Pts: Naz Reid 28	Pts: Shai Gilgeous-Alexander 35

Paycom Center, Oklahoma City, Oklahoma

The Thunder kept the same starting lineup against the Timberwolves that featured Karl-Anthony Towns and Rudy Gobert. The Thunder started off 4–4 from the field but struggled throughout the first half and trailed 57–47 at halftime. After an offensive rebound, Gobert accidentally elbowed Shai Gilgeous-Alexander in the face, leading to Gilgeous-Alexander to return to the locker room. Despite Gilgeous-Alexander's return, the Thunder fell behind 95–78 at the end of third. The Timberwolves continued to expand their lead, leading by as much as 29 points to a 120–95 win. Being guarded by his cousin Nickeil Alexander-Walker, Gilgeous-Alexander struggled shooting 5–for–19 for 22 points. Playing small, the Thunder were overwhelmed by Karl-Anthony Towns and Rudy Gobert who combined for 49 points and 21 rebounds as the Timberwolves outscored the Thunder 58–30 in points in the paint.

=== Recap ===
With the loss, the Thunder missed the playoffs for the third consecutive season and entered the 2023 NBA Draft lottery with twelfth best odds in the lottery after losing the tiebreaker with the Chicago Bulls. The Thunder improved their record, winning 16 more games for a 40–42 record along with a play-in victory over the Pelicans.

The Thunder were nominated for three 2022-23 season awards: Shai Gilgeous-Alexander for the NBA Most Improved Player, Jalen Williams for the NBA Rookie of the Year and Mark Daigneault for the NBA Coach of the Year. Daigneault led the Thunder into the play-in tournament and a game away from the eighth seed in the playoffs after low preseason expectations for the Thunder. Daigneault ultimately finished second in voting with 48 second place votes and 20 third place votes. Becoming a first-time All-Star, Gilgeous-Alexander finished second in voting with 24 first place votes and 54 second place votes losing to Lauri Markkanen. Williams, who averaged 14.1 points on 52% shooting, finished second in voting with 75 second place votes and 16 third place votes.

== Roster ==
2022–23 Oklahoma City Thunder roster
Players

Pos.	No.	Player	Height	Weight	DOB	From
G	14	Jared Butler (TW)	6 ft 3 in (1.91 m)	193 lb (88 kg)	2000-06-25	Baylor
F	13	Ousmane Dieng	6 ft 10 in (2.08 m)	205 lb (93 kg)	2003-05-21	France
G	5	Luguentz Dort	6 ft 3 in (1.91 m)	215 lb (98 kg)	1999-04-19	Arizona State
G	3	Josh Giddey	6 ft 8 in (2.03 m)	205 lb (93 kg)	2002-10-10	Australia
G	2	Shai Gilgeous-Alexander	6 ft 6 in (1.98 m)	180 lb (82 kg)	1998-07-12	Kentucky
F/C	7	Chet Holmgren (injured)	7 ft 1 in (2.16 m)	195 lb (88 kg)	2002-05-01	Gonzaga
G	11	Isaiah Joe	6 ft 4 in (1.93 m)	165 lb (75 kg)	1999-07-02	Arkansas
G	23	Tre Mann	6 ft 5 in (1.96 m)	190 lb (86 kg)	2001-02-03	Florida
F	17	Aleksej Pokuševski	7 ft 0 in (2.13 m)	190 lb (86 kg)	2001-12-26	Serbia
F	50	Jeremiah Robinson-Earl	6 ft 9 in (2.06 m)	230 lb (104 kg)	2000-11-03	Villanova
F	9	Dario Šarić	6 ft 10 in (2.08 m)	225 lb (102 kg)	1994-04-08	Croatia
C	30	Olivier Sarr (TW)	6 ft 11 in (2.11 m)	240 lb (109 kg)	1999-02-20	Kentucky
G	12	Lindy III Waters	6 ft 6 in (1.98 m)	215 lb (98 kg)	1997-07-28	Oklahoma State
G	21	Aaron Wiggins	6 ft 6 in (1.98 m)	200 lb (91 kg)	1999-01-02	Maryland
G/F	8	Jalen Williams	6 ft 6 in (1.98 m)	195 lb (88 kg)	2001-04-14	Santa Clara
F/C	6	Jaylin Williams	6 ft 10 in (2.08 m)	240 lb (109 kg)	2002-06-29	Arkansas
G/F	34	Kenrich Williams (injured)	6 ft 6 in (1.98 m)	210 lb (95 kg)	1994-12-02	TCU

Coaches
Head coach
- Mark Daigneault
Assistant(s)
- David Akinyooye
- Dave Bliss
- Chip Engelland
- Grant Gibbs
- Connor Johnson
- Eric Maynor
- Mike Wilks

Legend
- (DP) Unsigned draft pick
- (FA) Free agent
- (S) Suspended
- (GL) On assignment to G League affiliate
- (TW) Two-way affiliate player
- Injured

Roster
Updated: March 2, 2023

=== Roster notes ===
- Darius Bazley changed his jersey number to No. 55 while Chet Holmgren chose Bazley's former jersey number #7.
- Chet Holmgren sustained a Lisfranc injury in his right foot and missed the 2022-23 NBA season. Holmgren sustained the injury in the CrawsOver Pro-Am event while defending LeBron James on a fast break. The Thunder received an insurance reimbursement of 80% on Holmgren's per-game salary as a result of him missing 41 games.
- Eugene Omoruyi became the first player in Thunder history to wear jersey number #97, second in league history.

=== Salaries ===
Legend
UFA	RFA	Team option	Player option
‡ Waived with guaranteed money
(TW) Two-way affiliate player

Player	Salary					
Player	2022–23	2023–24	2024–25	2025–26	2026–27	2027–28
Shai Gilgeous-Alexander	$30,913,750	$33,386,850	$35,859,950	$38,333,050	$40,806,150	UFA
Luguentz Dort	$15,277,778	$15,277,778	$16,500,000	$17,722,222	$17,722,222	UFA
Chet Holmgren	$9,891,240	$10,386,000	$10,880,640	$13,731,368	RFA	
Dario Šarić	$9,240,000	UFA				
Josh Giddey	$6,287,400	$6,587,040	$8,352,367	RFA		
Ousmane Dieng	$4,569,840	$4,798,440	$5,027,040	$6,670,882	RFA	
Jalen Williams	$4,341,480	$4,558,680	$4,775,760	$6,580,997	RFA	
Aleksej Pokuševski	$3,261,480	$5,009,633	RFA			
Tre Mann	$3,046,200	$3,191,400	$4,908,373	RFA		
Jeremiah Robinson-Earl	$2,000,000	$1,900,000	$1,988,598	UFA		
Kenrich Williams	$2,000,000	$6,175,000	$6,669,000	$7,163,000	$7,163,000	UFA
Jaylin Williams	$2,000,000	$2,000,000	$2,019,699	$2,187,699	UFA	
Lindy Waters III	$1,927,896	$1,927,896	RFA			
Isaiah Joe	$1,836,090	$1,997,238	$2,164,993	UFA		
Aaron Wiggins	$1,563,518	$1,836,096	$1,988,598	UFA		
Jared Butler (TW)	Two-Way	RFA				
Olivier Sarr (TW)	Two-Way	RFA				
Kemba Walker ‡	$27,431,078					
JaMychal Green ‡	$5,571,403					
David Nwaba ‡	$5,022,000					
Trey Burke ‡	$3,300,000					
Sterling Brown ‡	$3,000,000					
Marquese Chriss ‡	$2,193,920					
Justin Jackson ‡	$2,133,278					
Kyle Singler ‡	$999,200					
Eugene Omoruyi ‡	$345,110					

Source: Spotrac

== Staff ==
Oklahoma City Thunder staff
Front Office: Chairman – Clay Bennett; Executive Vice President & General Manager – Sam Presti; Vice President of Basketball Operations – Rob Hennigan; Vice President of Basketball Operations – Will Dawkins; Management: Chief of Staff - Glenn Wong; Vice President of Strategy & Analysis - Jesse Gould; Vice President/Team Counsel & Strategic Alignment - Amanda Green; Vice President, Lifestyle Services & Social Impact - Ayana Lawson; Vice President of Identification & Intelligence – Vince Rozman; Vice President of Logistics & Engagement - Marc St. Yves; Pro Evaluation Scout/GM of Oklahoma City Blue - Nazr Mohammed; Director of Amateur Evaluation - Acie Law; Amateur Evaluation Scout/Special Assistant to the General Manager - Nick Collison; Video Analyst – D. J. White	Coaches: Head Coach – Mark Daigneault; Assistant Coach – David Akinyooye; Assistant Coach – Dave Bliss; Assistant Coach – Chip Engelland; Assistant Coach – Grant Gibbs; Assistant Coach – Mike Wilks; Assistant Coach for Player Development – Zach Peterson; Assistant Coach for Player Development – Eric Maynor; Assistant Coach for Program Development – Connor Johnson; Vice President of Human & Player Performance/Trainer – Donnie Strack; Trainer – Vanessa Brooks; Trainer – Tony Katzenmeier; → Coaching staff → Front office → Management

== Standings ==
=== Conference ===
Western Conference
#	Team	W	L	PCT	GB	GP
1	c – Denver Nuggets *	53	29	.646	–	82
2	y – Memphis Grizzlies *	51	31	.622	2.0	82
3	y – Sacramento Kings *	48	34	.585	5.0	82
4	x – Phoenix Suns	45	37	.549	8.0	82
5	x – Los Angeles Clippers	44	38	.537	9.0	82
6	x – Golden State Warriors	44	38	.537	9.0	82
7	x – Los Angeles Lakers	43	39	.524	10.0	82
8	x – Minnesota Timberwolves	42	40	.512	11.0	82
9	pi – New Orleans Pelicans	42	40	.512	11.0	82
10	pi – Oklahoma City Thunder	40	42	.488	13.0	82
11	Dallas Mavericks	38	44	.463	15.0	82
12	Utah Jazz	37	45	.451	16.0	82
13	Portland Trail Blazers	33	49	.402	20.0	82
14	Houston Rockets	22	60	.268	31.0	82
15	San Antonio Spurs	22	60	.268	31.0	82

=== Division ===
Northwest Division	W	L	PCT	GB	Home	Road	Div	GP
c – Denver Nuggets	53	29	.646	–	34‍–‍7	19‍–‍22	10–6	82
x – Minnesota Timberwolves	42	40	.512	11.0	22‍–‍19	20‍–‍21	8–8	82
pi – Oklahoma City Thunder	40	42	.488	13.0	24‍–‍17	16‍–‍25	9–7	82
Utah Jazz	37	45	.451	16.0	23‍–‍18	14‍–‍27	6–10	82
Portland Trail Blazers	33	49	.402	20.0	17‍–‍24	16‍–‍25	7–9	82

== Game log ==
=== Preseason ===
2022 preseason game log
Total: 5–1 (Home: 2–1; Road: 3–0)
Preseason: 5–1 (home: 2–1; road: 3–0)

Game	Date	Team	Score	High points	High rebounds	High assists	Location Attendance	Record
1	October 3	@ Denver	W 112–101	Tre Mann (17)	Josh Giddey (12)	Josh Giddey (9)	Ball Arena; 12,432	1–0
2	October 5	Dallas	L 96–98	Josh Giddey (13)	K. Williams, Bazley (6)	Giddey, Jal. Williams (3)	BOK Center	1–1
3	October 6	Adelaide	W 131–98	Tre Mann (26)	Jaylin Williams (12)	Giddey, Jay. Williams (6)	Paycom Center	2–1
4	October 9	Maccabi Ra'anana	W 144–97	Eugene Omoruyi (25)	Omoruyi, Jay. Williams (12)	Jalen Williams (13)	Paycom Center	3–1
5	October 11	@ Detroit	W 115–99	Dort, Jal. Williams, Giddey (16)	Darius Bazley (8)	Josh Giddey (9)	Little Caesars Arena; 8,723	4–1
6	October 13	@ San Antonio	W 118–112	Jalen Williams (21)	Jaylin Williams (11)	Giddey, Mann (6)	AT&T Center; 13,836	5–1

2022–23 pre-season schedule

=== Regular season ===
2022–23 game log
Total: 40–42 (Home: 25–17; Road: 15–25)
October: 3–3 (home: 2–1; road: 1–2)

Game	Date	Team	Score	High points	High rebounds	High assists	Location Attendance	Record
1	October 19	@ Minnesota	L 108–115	Shai Gilgeous-Alexander (32)	Josh Giddey (11)	Shai Gilgeous-Alexander (5)	Target Center; 17,136	0–1
2	October 22	@ Denver	L 117–122	Shai Gilgeous-Alexander (28)	Josh Giddey (12)	Shai Gilgeous-Alexander (7)	Ball Arena; 19,983	0–2
3	October 23	Minnesota	L 106–116	Luguentz Dort (20)	Mike Muscala (9)	Josh Giddey (5)	Paycom Center; 15,044	0–3
4	October 25	L.A. Clippers	W 108–94	Shai Gilgeous-Alexander (33)	Muscala, Wiggins (10)	Shai Gilgeous-Alexander (8)	Paycom Center; 13,105	1–3
5	October 27	L.A. Clippers	W 118–110	Shai Gilgeous-Alexander (24)	Darius Bazley (9)	Shai Gilgeous-Alexander (6)	Paycom Center; 14,510	2–3
6	October 29	@ Dallas	W 117–111	Shai Gilgeous-Alexander (38)	Darius Bazley (8)	Shai Gilgeous-Alexander (9)	American Airlines Center; 20,307	3–3

November : 6–10 (home: 4–4; road: 2–6)

Game	Date	Team	Score	High points	High rebounds	High assists	Location Attendance	Record
7	November 1	Orlando	W 116–108	Shai Gilgeous-Alexander (34)	Aleksej Pokuševski (9)	Josh Giddey (10)	Paycom Center; 13,109	4–3
8	November 3	Denver	L 110–122	Shai Gilgeous-Alexander (37)	Pokuševski, Robinson-Earl (7)	Josh Giddey (5)	Paycom Center; 13,791	4–4
9	November 5	@ Milwaukee	L 94–108	Shai Gilgeous-Alexander (18)	Josh Giddey (6)	Luguentz Dort (7)	Fiserv Forum; 17,713	4–5
10	November 7	@ Detroit	L 103–112	Shai Gilgeous-Alexander (33)	Kenrich Williams (8)	Shai Gilgeous-Alexander (5)	Little Caesars Arena; 16,223	4–6
11	November 9	Milwaukee	L 132–136 (2OT)	Shai Gilgeous-Alexander (39)	Josh Giddey (15)	Josh Giddey (6)	Paycom Center; 15,180	4–7
12	November 11	Toronto	W 132–113	Eugene Omoruyi (22)	Josh Giddey (9)	Jalen Williams (11)	Paycom Center; 16,104	5–7
13	November 13	@ New York	W 145–135	Shai Gilgeous-Alexander (37)	Josh Giddey (10)	Josh Giddey (12)	Madison Square Garden; 18,325	6–7
14	November 14	@ Boston	L 122–126	Shai Gilgeous-Alexander (37)	Aleksej Pokuševski (14)	Shai Gilgeous-Alexander (8)	TD Garden; 19,156	6–8
15	November 16	@ Washington	W 121–120	Shai Gilgeous-Alexander (42)	Giddey, Gilgeous-Alexander (6)	Shai Gilgeous-Alexander (7)	Capital One Arena; 12,630	7–8
16	November 18	@ Memphis	L 110–121	Josh Giddey (20)	Dort, Robinson-Earl (7)	Josh Giddey (11)	FedEx Forum; 17,324	7–9
17	November 21	New York	L 119–129	Shai Gilgeous-Alexander (30)	Josh Giddey (9)	Giddey, Gilgeous-Alexander (7)	Paycom Center; 15,079	7–10
18	November 23	Denver	L 126–131 (OT)	Shai Gilgeous-Alexander (31)	Jeremiah Robinson-Earl (11)	Shai Gilgeous-Alexander (11)	Paycom Center; 13,656	7–11
19	November 25	Chicago	W 123–119 (OT)	Shai Gilgeous-Alexander (30)	Josh Giddey (13)	Josh Giddey (9)	Paycom Center; 16,082	8–11
20	November 26	@ Houston	L 105–118	Shai Gilgeous-Alexander (32)	Giddey, Mann, Robinson-Earl, Jal. Williams (5)	Jalen Williams (4)	Toyota Center; 15,151	8–12
21	November 28	@ New Orleans	L 101–105	Shai Gilgeous-Alexander (31)	Jeremiah Robinson-Earl (13)	Luguentz Dort (5)	Smoothie King Center; 13,109	8–13
22	November 30	San Antonio	W 119–111	Jalen Williams (27)	Josh Giddey (14)	Josh Giddey (5)	Paycom Center; 15,605	9–13

December : 6–8 (home: 4–4; road: 2–4)

Game	Date	Team	Score	High points	High rebounds	High assists	Location Attendance	Record
23	December 3	@ Minnesota	W 135–128	Shai Gilgeous-Alexander (33)	Josh Giddey (12)	Josh Giddey (7)	Target Center; 17,136	10–13
24	December 5	@ Atlanta	W 121–114	Shai Gilgeous-Alexander (35)	Luguentz Dort (10)	Shai Gilgeous-Alexander (5)	State Farm Arena; 16,301	11–13
25	December 7	@ Memphis	L 102–123	Shai Gilgeous-Alexander (26)	Josh Giddey (10)	Shai Gilgeous-Alexander (7)	FedExForum; 15,942	11–14
26	December 10	@ Cleveland	L 102–110	Shai Gilgeous-Alexander (23)	Aleksej Pokuševski (14)	Josh Giddey (6)	Rocket Mortgage FieldHouse; 19,432	11–15
27	December 12	@ Dallas	L 114–121	Shai Gilgeous-Alexander (42)	Aleksej Pokuševski (9)	Giddey, Jal. Williams (4)	American Airlines Center; 19,877	11–16
28	December 14	Miami	L 108–110	Shai Gilgeous-Alexander (27)	Josh Giddey (11)	Giddey, Gilgeous-Alexander (7)	Paycom Center; 14,783	11–17
29	December 16	Minnesota	L 110–112	Shai Gilgeous-Alexander (35)	Josh Giddey (13)	Josh Giddey (6)	Paycom Center; 14,885	11–18
30	December 17	Memphis	W 115–109	Luguentz Dort (24)	Kenrich Williams (8)	Jalen Williams (6)	Paycom Center; 16,895	12–18
31	December 19	Portland	W 123–121	Shai Gilgeous-Alexander (35)	Jalen Williams (7)	Shai Gilgeous-Alexander (6)	Paycom Center; 14,672	13–18
32	December 21	Portland	W 101–98	Shai Gilgeous-Alexander (27)	Kenrich Williams (7)	Josh Giddey (6)	Paycom Center; 15,107	14–18
33	December 23	New Orleans	L 125–128 (OT)	Shai Gilgeous-Alexander (44)	Giddey, Gilgeous-Alexander (10)	Giddey, Gilgeous-Alexander (6)	Paycom Center; 15,214	14–19
34	December 27	San Antonio	W 130–114	Shai Gilgeous-Alexander (28)	Jalen Williams (9)	Giddey, Gilgeous-Alexander (8)	Paycom Center; 16,229	15–19
35	December 29	@ Charlotte	L 113–121	Shai Gilgeous-Alexander (28)	Giddey, Jay. Williams (10)	Shai Gilgeous-Alexander (5)	Spectrum Center; 19,425	15–20
36	December 31	Philadelphia	L 96–115	Josh Giddey (20)	Josh Giddey (9)	Shai Gilgeous-Alexander (5)	Paycom Center; 17,147	15–21

January: 9–5 (home: 5–2; road: 4–3)

Game	Date	Team	Score	High points	High rebounds	High assists	Location Attendance	Record
37	January 3	Boston	W 150–117	Josh Giddey (25)	Jaylin Williams (7)	Jalen Williams (6)	Paycom Center; 16,778	16–21
38	January 4	@ Orlando	L 115–126	Shai Gilgeous-Alexander (33)	Kenrich Williams (9)	Giddey, Gilgeous-Alexander, Mann, Jal. Williams (4)	Amway Center; 18,925	16–22
39	January 6	Washington	W 127–110	Shai Gilgeous-Alexander (30)	Jalen Williams (8)	Josh Giddey (9)	Paycom Center; 14,790	17–22
40	January 8	Dallas	W 120–109	Shai Gilgeous-Alexander (33)	Kenrich Williams (9)	Giddey, Gilgeous-Alexander, Wiggins (5)	Paycom Center; 16,317	18–22
41	January 10	@ Miami	L 111–112	Shai Gilgeous-Alexander (26)	Josh Giddey (15)	Josh Giddey (10)	FTX Arena; 19,600	18–23
42	January 12	@ Philadelphia	W 133–114	Shai Gilgeous-Alexander (37)	Shai Gilgeous-Alexander (8)	Josh Giddey (6)	Wells Fargo Center; 20,892	19–23
43	January 13	@ Chicago	W 124–110	Josh Giddey (25)	Josh Giddey (10)	Giddey, Gilgeous-Alexander (6)	United Center; 21,342	20–23
44	January 15	@ Brooklyn	W 112–102	Giddey, Gilgeous-Alexander (28)	Josh Giddey (9)	Josh Giddey (9)	Barclays Center; 18,165	21–23
45	January 18	Indiana	W 126–106	Gilgeous-Alexander, Joe (23)	Luguentz Dort (11)	Josh Giddey (11)	Paycom Center; 14,748	22–23
46	January 20	@ Sacramento	L 113–118	Shai Gilgeous-Alexander (37)	Josh Giddey (10)	Shai Gilgeous-Alexander (7)	Golden 1 Center; 17,932	22–24
47	January 22	@ Denver	W 101–99	Shai Gilgeous-Alexander (34)	Josh Giddey (9)	Shai Gilgeous-Alexander (5)	Ball Arena; 19,557	23–24
48	January 25	Atlanta	L 132–137	Shai Gilgeous-Alexander (36)	Josh Giddey (8)	Gilgeous-Alexander, K. Williams (8)	Paycom Center; 15,079	23–25
49	January 27	Cleveland	W 112–100	Shai Gilgeous-Alexander (35)	Wiggins, K. Williams (7)	Shai Gilgeous-Alexander (8)	Paycom Center; 16,236	24–25
50	January 30	Golden State	L 120–128	Shai Gilgeous-Alexander (31)	Giddey, K. Williams, Jay. Williams (8)	Shai Gilgeous-Alexander (7)	Paycom Center; 16,854	24–26

February: 4–7 (home: 2–3; road: 2–4)

Game	Date	Team	Score	High points	High rebounds	High assists	Location Attendance	Record
51	February 1	@ Houston	L 106–112	Shai Gilgeous-Alexander (24)	Darius Bazley (9)	Josh Giddey (8)	Toyota Center; 15,181	24–27
52	February 4	Houston	W 153–121	Shai Gilgeous-Alexander (42)	Josh Giddey (8)	Josh Giddey (10)	Paycom Center; 16,994	25–27
53	February 6	@ Golden State	L 114–141	Shai Gilgeous-Alexander (20)	Josh Giddey (7)	Josh Giddey (8)	Chase Center; 18,064	25–28
54	February 7	@ L.A. Lakers	W 133–130	Shai Gilgeous-Alexander (30)	Jal. Williams, Jay. Williams (7)	Shai Gilgeous-Alexander (8)	Crypto.com Arena; 18,997	26–28
55	February 10	@ Portland	W 138–129	Shai Gilgeous-Alexander (44)	Josh Giddey (6)	Giddey, Gilgeous-Alexander (7)	Moda Center; 19,424	27–28
56	February 13	New Orleans	L 100–103	Shai Gilgeous-Alexander (24)	Shai Gilgeous-Alexander (10)	Shai Gilgeous-Alexander (5)	Paycom Center; 14,920	27–29
57	February 15	Houston	W 133–96	Shai Gilgeous-Alexander (29)	Jaylin Williams (16)	Giddey, Gilgeous-Alexander (6)	Paycom Center; 14,988	28–29
All-Star Break
58	February 23	@ Utah	L 119–120 (OT)	Shai Gilgeous-Alexander (39)	Dort, Giddey (11)	Shai Gilgeous-Alexander (7)	Vivint Arena; 18,206	28–30
59	February 24	@ Phoenix	L 115–124	Isaiah Joe (28)	Luguentz Dort (10)	Giddey, Jay. Williams (5)	Footprint Center; 17,071	28–31
60	February 26	Sacramento	L 115–124	Isaiah Joe (24)	Giddey, Waters III (7)	Josh Giddey (5)	Paycom Center; 15,147	28–32
61	February 28	Sacramento	L 117–123	Jalen Williams (27)	Dario Šarić (8)	Jalen Williams (8)	Paycom Center; 13,353	28–33

March : 10–7 (home: 6–2; road: 4–5)

Game	Date	Team	Score	High points	High rebounds	High assists	Location Attendance	Record
62	March 1	L.A. Lakers	L 117–123	Jalen Williams (24)	Jaylin Williams (12)	Josh Giddey (11)	Paycom Center; 17,114	28–34
63	March 3	Utah	W 130–103	Aaron Wiggins (27)	Jaylin Williams (9)	Josh Giddey (13)	Paycom Center; 16,538	29–34
64	March 5	Utah	W 129–119	Shai Gilgeous-Alexander (38)	Josh Giddey (9)	Josh Giddey (9)	Paycom Center; 14,778	30–34
65	March 7	Golden State	W 137–128	Shai Gilgeous-Alexander (33)	Josh Giddey (11)	Josh Giddey (17)	Paycom Center; 16,142	31–34
66	March 8	@ Phoenix	L 101–132	Lindy Waters III (23)	Dieng, Giddey, Robinson-Earl (7)	Josh Giddey (5)	Footprint Center; 17,071	31–35
67	March 11	@ New Orleans	W 110–96	Shai Gilgeous-Alexander (35)	Josh Giddey (7)	Luguentz Dort (5)	Smoothie King Center; 17,606	32–35
68	March 12	@ San Antonio	W 102–90	Jalen Williams (21)	Josh Giddey (10)	Jalen Williams (10)	AT&T Center; 17,314	33–35
69	March 14	Brooklyn	W 121–107	Shai Gilgeous-Alexander (35)	Josh Giddey (13)	Josh Giddey (10)	Paycom Center; 16,976	34–35
70	March 16	@ Toronto	L 111–128	Shai Gilgeous-Alexander (29)	Luguentz Dort (8)	Luguentz Dort (5)	Scotiabank Arena; 19,800	34–36
71	March 19	Phoenix	W 124–120	Shai Gilgeous-Alexander (40)	Jalen Williams (10)	Josh Giddey (6)	Paycom Center; 17,897	35–36
72	March 21	@ L.A. Clippers	W 101–100	Shai Gilgeous-Alexander (31)	Jalen Williams (8)	Josh Giddey (6)	Crypto.com Arena; 19,068	36–36
73	March 23	@ L.A. Clippers	L 105–127	Shai Gilgeous-Alexander (30)	Jaylin Williams (9)	Giddey, Jal. Williams, Jay. Williams (4)	Crypto.com Arena; 17,307	36–37
74	March 24	@ L.A. Lakers	L 111–116	Giddey, Gilgeous-Alexander (27)	Josh Giddey (17)	Shai Gilgeous-Alexander (8)	Crypto.com Arena; 18,997	36–38
75	March 26	@ Portland	W 118–112	Shai Gilgeous-Alexander (31)	Josh Giddey (11)	Josh Giddey (6)	Moda Center; 18,626	37–38
76	March 28	Charlotte	L 134–137	Isaiah Joe (33)	Josh Giddey (10)	Josh Giddey (9)	Paycom Center; 15,428	37–39
77	March 29	Detroit	W 107–106	Jalen Williams (27)	Jalen Williams (8)	Josh Giddey (7)	Paycom Center; 15,047	38–39
78	March 31	@ Indiana	L 117–121	Shai Gilgeous-Alexander (39)	Luguentz Dort (10)	Jalen Williams (6)	Gainbridge Fieldhouse; 16,506	38–40

April : 2–2 (home: 1–1; road: 1–1)

Game	Date	Team	Score	High points	High rebounds	High assists	Location Attendance	Record
79	April 2	Phoenix	L 118–128	Shai Gilgeous-Alexander (39)	Josh Giddey (9)	Josh Giddey (8)	Paycom Center; 17,981	38–41
80	April 4	@ Golden State	L 125–136	Shai Gilgeous-Alexander (32)	Josh Giddey (6)	Shai Gilgeous-Alexander (7)	Chase Center; 18,064	38–42
81	April 6	@ Utah	W 114–98	Shai Gilgeous-Alexander (22)	Dario Šarić (10)	Josh Giddey (8)	Vivint Arena; 18,206	39–42
82	April 9	Memphis	W 115–100	Jared Butler (25)	Olivier Sarr (15)	Tre Mann (12)	Paycom Center; 16,601	40–42

2022–23 season schedule

=== Play-in ===
2023 play-in game log
Total: 1–1 (Home: 0–0; Road: 1–1)
Play-In: 1–1 (home: 0–0; road: 1–1)

Game	Date	Team	Score	High points	High rebounds	High assists	Location Attendance	Record
1	April 12	@ New Orleans	W 123–118	Shai Gilgeous-Alexander (32)	Josh Giddey (9)	Josh Giddey (10)	Smoothie King Center; 18,715	1–0
1	April 14	@ Minnesota	L 95–120	Shai Gilgeous-Alexander (22)	Luguentz Dort (8)	Jalen Williams (5)	Target Center; 19,304	1—1

2022–23 season schedule

=== Record vs. opponents ===
Record vs. opponents

Eastern Conference
Opponent		H	A	T	W%
Atlantic Division
BOS	Boston Celtics	1–0	0–1	1–1	.500
BKN	Brooklyn Nets	1–0	1–0	2–0	1.000
NYK	New York Knicks	0–1	1–0	1–1	.500
PHI	Philadelphia 76ers	0–1	1–0	1–1	.500
TOR	Toronto Raptors	1–0	0–1	1–1	.500
Total		3–2	3–2	6–4	.600
Central Division
CHI	Chicago Bulls	1–0	1–0	2–0	1.000
CLE	Cleveland Cavaliers	1–0	0–1	1–1	.500
DET	Detroit Pistons	1–0	0–1	1–1	.500
IND	Indiana Pacers	1–0	0–1	1–1	.500
MIL	Milwaukee Bucks	0–1	0–1	0–2	.000
Total		4–1	1–4	5–4	.500
Southeast Division
ATL	Atlanta Hawks	0–1	1–0	1–1	.500
CHA	Charlotte Hornets	0–1	0–1	0–2	.000
MIA	Miami Heat	0–1	0–1	0–2	.000
ORL	Orlando Magic	1–0	0–1	1–1	.500
WAS	Washington Wizards	1–0	1–0	2–0	1.000
Total		2–3	2–3	4–6	.400
Conference total		9–6	6–9	15–15	.500

Western Conference
Opponent		H	A	T	W%
Northwest Division
DEN	Denver Nuggets	0–2	1–1	1–3	.250
MIN	Minnesota Timberwolves	0–2	1–1	1–3	.250
OKC	Oklahoma City Thunder	—			
POR	Portland Trail Blazers	2–0	2–0	4–0	1.000
UTA	Utah Jazz	2–0	1–1	3–1	.750
Total		4–4	5–3	9–7	.563
Pacific Division
GSW	Golden State Warriors	1–1	0–2	1–3	.250
LAC	Los Angeles Clippers	2–0	1–1	3–1	.750
LAL	Los Angeles Lakers	0–1	1–1	1–2	.333
PHX	Phoenix Suns	1–1	0–2	1–3	.250
SAC	Sacramento Kings	0–2	0–1	0–3	.000
Total		4–5	2–7	6–12	.333
Southwest Division
DAL	Dallas Mavericks	1–0	1–1	2–1	.667
HOU	Houston Rockets	2–0	0–2	2–2	.500
MEM	Memphis Grizzlies	2–0	0–2	2–2	.500
NOP	New Orleans Pelicans	0–2	1–1	1–3	.250
SAS	San Antonio Spurs	2–0	1–0	3–0	1.000
Total		7–2	3–6	10–8	.556
Conference total		15–11	10–16	25–27	.481

== Player statistics ==
Legend
GP	Games played	GS	Games started	MPG	Minutes per game
FG%	Field goal percentage	3P%	3-point field goal percentage	FT%	Free throw percentage
RPG	Rebounds per game	APG	Assists per game	SPG	Steals per game
BPG	Blocks per game	PPG	Points per game	**Bold**	Career high

Sabremetrics
TS%	True shooting percentage	eFG%	Effective field goal percentage	ORB%	Offensive rebound percentage
DRB%	Defensive rebound percentage	TRB%	Total rebound percentage	AST%	Assist percentage
STL%	Steal percentage	BLK%	Block percentage	TOV%	Turnover percentage
USG%	Usage percentage	ORtg	Offensive rating	DRtg	Defensive rating
PER	Player efficiency rating

=== Preseason ===
Player	GP	GS	MPG	FG%	3P%	FT%	RPG	APG	SPG	BPG	PPG
Darius Bazley	5	1	22.4	48.6%	12.5%	66.7%	6.4	1.8	0.0	1.8	10.2
Ousmane Dieng	5	1	24.7	57.9%	47.1%	75.0%	3.2	1.4	0.6	0.2	11.0
Luguentz Dort	3	3	18.5	54.5%	35.3%	69.2%	3.0	1.7	0.7	0.3	17.0
Abdul Gaddy ^{T}	1	0	3.7	–	–	–	0.0	0.0	0.0	0.0	0.0
Josh Giddey	5	5	22.6	52.8%	53.3%	63.6%	6.0	6.6	1.4	0.6	14.2
Sacha Killeya-Jones ^{T}	1	0	2.6	–	–	–	0.0	0.0	0.0	1.0	0.0
Shai Gilgeous-Alexander	–	–	–	–	–	–	–	–	–	–	–
Chet Holmgren	–	–	–	–	–	–	–	–	–	–	–
Tre Mann	5	4	23.6	49.2%	52.8%	100%	1.0	3.0	0.6	0.6	16.0
David Nwaba ^{T}	5	0	12.0	28.6%	0.0%	85.0%	3.0	0.2	0.6	0.2	4.2
Mike Muscala	–	–	–	–	–	–	–	–	–	–	–
Eugene Omoruyi	6	0	17.1	59.6%	42.9%	100%	4.0	0.7	0.8	0.2	11.8
Aleksej Pokuševski	6	3	21.8	47.6%	30.4%	80.0%	5.3	3.8	0.2	1.2	9.2
Jeremiah Robinson-Earl	5	5	19.2	34.2%	6.3%	88.9%	3.6	0.8	1.2	0.0	7.0
Jaden Shackelford ^{T}	1	0	13.1	50.0%	66.7%	–	1.0	1.0	0.0	0.0	6.0
Lindy Waters III	6	1	17.0	40.0%	42.9%	91.7%	3.0	1.3	0.8	0.2	8.5
Aaron Wiggins	6	3	17.9	47.2%	55.6%	100%	3.5	0.8	0.8	0.2	9.2
Jalen Williams	5	2	26.3	61.0%	22.2%	76.9%	3.0	5.2	1.8	0.0	14.4
Jaylin Williams	6	1	18.8	53.3%	25.0%	53.8%	7.5	2.5	0.5	0.3	4.0
Kenrich Williams	2	1	18.5	45.5%	0.0%	66.7%	4.5	1.5	0.5	0.5	7.0
Robert Woodard II ^{T}	2	0	9.4	28.6%	0.0%	–	2.5	0.5	0.0	0.0	2.0

Led team in statistic

Source: RealGM
^{T} Waived after preseason

=== Regular season ===
Oklahoma City Thunder statistics
Player	GP	GS	MPG	FG%	3P%	FT%	RPG	APG	SPG	BPG	PPG
Darius Bazley ^{†}	36	1	15.4	44.9%	40.0%	55.4%	3.4	0.9	0.5	0.8	5.4
Jared Butler ≠	6	1	12.8	46.9%	50.0%	–	0.7	1.3	0.8	0.0	6.2
Ousmane Dieng	39	1	14.6	42.0%	26.5%	65.2%	2.7	1.2	0.4	0.2	4.9
Luguentz Dort	74	73	30.7	38.8%	33.0%	77.2%	4.6	2.1	1.0	0.3	13.7
Josh Giddey	76	76	31.3	48.2%	32.5%	73.1%	7.9	6.2	0.8	0.4	16.6
Shai Gilgeous-Alexander	68	68	35.5	51.0%	34.5%	90.5%	4.8	5.5	1.6	1.0	31.4
Chet Holmgren	–	–	–	–	–	–	–	–	–	–	–
Isaiah Joe	73	10	19.1	44.1%	40.9%	82.0%	2.4	1.2	0.7	0.1	9.5
Tre Mann	67	5	17.7	39.3%	31.5%	76.4%	2.3	1.8	0.6	0.2	7.7
Mike Muscala ^{†}	43	5	14.5	43.8%	39.4%	79.5%	3.1	0.9	0.3	0.4	6.2
Eugene Omoruyi ^{‡}	23	2	11.8	46.8%	25.8%	60.7%	2.3	0.5	0.6	0.0	4.9
Aleksej Pokuševski	34	25	20.6	43.4%	36.5%	62.9%	4.7	1.9	0.6	1.3	8.1
Jeremiah Robinson-Earl	43	20	18.9	44.4%	33.3%	83.3%	4.2	1.0	0.6	0.3	6.8
Dario Šarić ^{≠}	20	0	13.7	51.5%	39.1%	84.4%	3.3	0.9	0.4	0.1	7.4
Olivier Sarr ^{≠}	9	1	12.6	50.0%	12.5%	71.4%	3.4	0.4	0.1	0.6	4.0
Lindy Waters III	41	0	12.9	39.3%	35.8%	80.0%	1.8	0.7	0.3	0.3	5.2
Aaron Wiggins	70	14	18.5	51.2%	39.3%	83.1%	3.0	1.1	0.6	0.2	6.8
Jalen Williams	75	62	30.3	52.1%	35.6%	81.2%	4.5	3.3	1.4	0.5	14.1
Jaylin Williams	49	36	18.7	43.6%	40.7%	70.4%	4.9	1.6	0.6	0.2	5.9
Kenrich Williams	53	10	22.8	51.7%	37.3%	43.6%	4.9	2.0	0.8	0.3	8.0

Led team in statistic

Source: Basketball-Reference
^{‡} Waived during the season
^{†} Traded during the season
^{≠} Acquired during the season

Sabremetrics

Player	TS%	eFG%	ORB%	DRB%	TRB%	AST%	STL%	BLK%	TOV%	USG%	ORtg	DRtg	PER
Darius Bazley ^{†}	.525	.506	5.4	18.1	11.6	7.5	1.6	4.7	10.5	15.7	108.3	110.8	13.0
Jared Butler ≠	.578	.578	1.3	4.2	2.7	14.5	3.1	–	13.5	19.7	105.6	114.7	12.4
Ousmane Dieng	.505	.492	3.4	16.5	9.7	10.8	1.2	1.1	12.0	24.6	109.5	114.6	9.3
Luguentz Dort	.513	.466	5.9	10.4	8.1	9.2	1.6	0.9	8.5	19.8	109.2	115.6	11.3
Josh Giddey	.533	.516	6.6	20.9	13.6	29.9	1.1	1.2	15.1	24.6	109.5	114.6	17.0
Shai Gilgeous-Alexander	.626	.531	2.6	12.3	7.3	25.8	2.2	2.5	10.1	32.8	125.5	113.3	27.2
Chet Holmgren	–	–	–	–	–	–	–	–	–	–	–	–	–
Isaiah Joe	.626	.599	2.0	11.6	6.7	8.7	1.6	0.5	6.6	17.7	125.0	115.9	14.4
Tre Mann	.492	.474	2.4	11.9	7.0	13.9	1.6	0.9	10.6	20.7	101.0	115.9	9.9
Mike Muscala ^{†}	.602	.576	3.9	19.6	11.6	8.1	0.8	2.8	6.0	15.8	124.3	114.3	13.8
Eugene Omoruyi ^{‡}	.531	.511	8.6	12.0	10.3	5.8	2.5	-	13.1	18.9	104.4	114.1	10.6
Aleksej Pokuševski	.522	.510	6.7	17.4	12.0	12.5	1.3	5.5	14.0	18.3	105.0	111.0	13.3
Jeremiah Robinson-Earl	.548	.518	8.9	14.6	11.6	7.2	1.4	1.2	6.7	14.6	120.4	115.1	12.9
Dario Šarić ^{≠}	.650	.606	5.3	20.7	12.7	9.0	1.2	0.7	14.4	20.0	119.0	114.9	15.7
Olivier Sarr ^{≠}	.544	.517	11.0	18.5	14.6	4.9	0.4	4.0	10.8	13.7	115.8	116.5	11.7
Lindy Waters III	.573	.556	3.2	12.2	7.6	7.2	1.3	2.0	5.1	15.6	118.7	115.9	11.8
Aaron Wiggins	.607	.579	5.6	12.0	8.8	8.2	1.4	1.1	12.2	14.5	119.1	115.9	12.2
Jalen Williams	.601	.567	3.9	12.2	8.0	15.4	2.2	1.4	12.3	18.4	118.6	114.0	15.6
Jaylin Williams	.559	.534	5.0	23.6	14.1	10.8	1.5	1.2	12.6	13.5	114.5	113.1	11.2
Kenrich Williams	.585	.590	8.4	14.9	11.6	11.5	1.8	1.1	8.1	13.6	126.5	114.1	14.5

Source: RealGM

=== Play-in ===
Player	GP	GS	MPG	FG%	3P%	FT%	RPG	APG	SPG	BPG	PPG
Ousmane Dieng	1	0	7.2	40.0%	0.0%	–	2.0	0.0	0.0	0.0	4.0
Luguentz Dort	2	2	36.2	50.0%	50.0%	80.0%	6.5	2.0	1.0	0.5	22.0
Josh Giddey	2	2	36.2	37.1%	27.3%	88.9%	7.0	7.0	0.5	0.5	18.5
Shai Gilgeous-Alexander	2	2	38.7	39.0%	33.3%	100%	6.0	3.0	2.0	2.0	27.0
Isaiah Joe	2	0	20.2	28.6%	25.0%	–	2.0	1.0	0.0	0.5	5.0
Tre Mann	1	0	5.2	–	–	–	1.0	1.0	0.0	0.0	0.0
Jeremiah Robinson-Earl	1	0	5.2	100%	100%	–	1.0	0.0	0.0	0.0	3.0
Dario Šarić	2	0	11.7	50.0%	0.0%	–	2.5	0.0	0.5	0.5	3.0
Lindy Waters III	2	0	10.5	28.6%	16.7%	–	1.5	1.0	0.5	0.0	2.5
Aaron Wiggins	2	0	14.3	66.7%	0.0%	100%	1.5	0.0	0.5	0.0	5.5
Jalen Williams	2	2	36.1	37.5%	30.8%	75.0%	4.0	3.5	2.5	0.5	14.0
Jaylin Williams	2	2	27.4	42.9%	27.3%	50.0%	7.0	4.0	0.5	1.0	8.0

Led team in statistic

Source: NBA

=== Individual game highs ===
Offense
Points
Shai Gilgeous-Alexander	44 vs Pelicans on December 23, 2022; 44 vs Trail Blazers on February 10, 2023
Assists
Josh Giddey	17 vs Warriors on March 7, 2023
Field goals made
Shai Gilgeous-Alexander	17 vs Pelicans on December 23, 2022
Threes made
Isaiah Joe	7 vs Nuggets on November 23, 2022; 7 vs Pacers on January 18, 2023; 7 vs Kings on January 20, 2023
Free throws made
Shai Gilgeous-Alexander	18 vs Trail Blazers on February 10, 2023

Defense
Rebounds
Josh Giddey	17 vs Lakers on March 24, 2023
Steals
Jalen Williams	6 vs Lakers on February 7, 2023
Blocks
Shai Gilgeous-Alexander; Aleksej Pokuševski; Shai Gilgeous-Alexander	4 vs Pistons on November 7, 2022; 4 vs Raptors on November 11, 2022; 4 vs Spurs on December 27, 2022
Miscellaneous
Double-doubles
Josh Giddey	28
Triple-doubles
Josh Giddey	4

== Awards and records ==
=== Awards ===
Date	Player	Award
October 31, 2022	Shai Gilgeous-Alexander (1/2)	October 24–30 Player of the Week (Note: Oklahoma City’s dynamic guard Shai Gilgeous-Alexander led the team to an undefeated 3-0 week with averages of 31.7 points, 7.7 assists and 5.3 rebounds. His Week 2 was highlighted by a 38-point, 9-assist gem against the Mavericks on Saturday as he led the Thunder to a wild, comeback win in overtime. The Thunder currently have a record of 3-2.)
December 1, 2022	Jalen Williams (1/2)	October/November Rookie of the Month (Note: Jalen Williams, the No. 12 pick in the 2022 NBA Draft, appeared in 18 games (seven starts) for the Thunder and averaged 10.7 points (5th among rookies) on 52.4% shooting to go along with 3.2 rebounds and 2.6 assists (4th among rookies) in 25.1 minutes per game. After second-year Thunder guard Josh Giddey won four Rookie of the Month awards during the 2021-22 season, Thunder rookies have now captured the award in five of the past six months. Williams becomes the third Thunder rookie to win Rookie of the Month honors.)
January 31, 2023	Josh Giddey	NBA Rising Star (Note: Giddey has played in 45 games (all starts) this season and averaged 16.1 points (second on the team), 8.0 rebounds and 5.7 assists in 30.8 minutes per game. His assists rank second among sophomores, while his scoring ranks fourth and his rebounds third.)
January 31, 2023	Jalen Williams	NBA Rising Star (Note: Williams has seen action in 46 games (33 starts) in his rookie season and is averaging 12.1 points, 3.9 rebounds, 2.8 assists and 1.07 steals in 28.7 minutes per game. He is shooting 51.4% from the field, which leads all rookies, while his assists rank fourth, his steals second and scoring fifth.)
February 2, 2023	Shai Gilgeous-Alexander	NBA All-Star (Note: Gilgeous-Alexander has appeared in 47 games (all starts) this season and averaged 30.8 points (5th in NBA), 5.6 assists, 4.8 rebounds, 1.68 steals (8th in NBA) and 1.11 blocks in 35.6 minutes per game. His blocks lead all guards and he is shooting 50.5% from the field and 91.0% from the free throw line, which ranks fifth in the NBA.)
February 13, 2023	Shai Gilgeous-Alexander (2/2)	February 6–12 Player of the Week (Note: Oklahoma City’s leader powered his squad to a 2-1 week with averages of 31.3 points on 57.1% shooting and 6.3 assists. His week was highlighted by a 44-point performance against Portland, which tied his season-high for most points in a game. The Thunder (27-28) are currently 10th in the West standings.)
April 11, 2023	Jalen Williams (2/2)	March/April Rookie of the Month (Note: The No. 12 overall pick shined throughout his rookie season and continued his strong play over the final months with averages of 18.7 points, 5.5 rebounds and 4.3 assists. He scored 30-plus points twice during March and was a key piece to Oklahoma City’s run into the AT&T Play-In Tournament as the 10th seed. For the season, Williams averaged 14.1 points, 4.5 rebounds and 3.3 assists over 75 games.)
May 8, 2023	Jalen Williams	All-Rookie First Team (Note: This season Williams appeared in 75 games (62 starts) and averaged 14.1 points on 52.1% shooting, 4.5 rebounds, 3.3 assists and 1.37 steals in 30.3 minutes per game. Among rookies, his steals led the league, while his points, assists and field goal percentage each ranked fourth. The Santa Clara product scored 20-plus points in 17 games this season, second most by a rookie in Thunder history. He scored at least 15 points in 10 straight games, the second-longest streak by a rookie this season, and scored in double digits in 15 of his last 18 games.)
May 10, 2023	Shai Gilgeous-Alexander	All-NBA First Team

- Mark Daigneault finished second in NBA Coach of the Year voting with 48 second place votes and 20 third place votes.
- Shai Gilgeous-Alexander finished second in NBA Most Improved Player voting with 24 first place votes and 54 second place votes.
- Jalen Williams finished second in NBA Rookie of the Year voting with 75 second place votes and 16 third place votes.

=== Records ===
- In Shai Gilgeous-Alexander's first seven appearances this season, Gilgeous-Alexander scored 226 points marking the highest point total in Thunder history by a player through his first seven games of a season.
- On November 11, 2022, eight Thunder players scored in double-figures for the first time in Thunder history in a 132–113 win over the Toronto Raptors.
- On November 13, 2022, Josh Giddey joined Wilt Chamberlain as the only other player in NBA history to record triple-doubles during their first two games at Madison Square Garden against the New York Knicks. Giddey had 24 points, 10 rebounds, and 12 assists in his second game at Madison Square Garden.
- On December 27, 2022, the Thunder bench recorded 68 points marking the second most bench points in Thunder history.
- On December 27, 2022, Josh Giddey became the second-youngest NBA player to reach 1,000 points, 500 rebounds and 500 assists, behind only LeBron James.
- On January 3, 2023, the Thunder recorded a then franchise-high 150 points in Oklahoma City history as well as a franchise-high 48 points in a quarter. 150 is also tied for the second-highest total the Boston Celtics have allowed in franchise history.
- On January 3, 2023, the Thunder had five players score 20 or more points in a game for the second time in franchise history.
- On January 18, 2023, the Thunder recorded a franchise-high 41 assists against the Indiana Pacers in a 126–106 win. Josh Giddey had 11 assists and Kenrich Williams had a career high 10 assists.
- On February 4, 2023, the Thunder recorded a franchise-high 153 points against the Houston Rockets in a 153–121 win. Shai Gilgeous-Alexander scored 42 points to lead all scorers. The Thunder had six players in double figures scoring.

=== Milestones ===
- On November 13, 2022, Shai Gilgeous-Alexander passed Paul George on the Thunder's all-time scoring list.
- On December 1, 2022, Jalen Williams joined Russell Westbrook and Josh Giddey to earn Rookie of the Month honors since the franchise moved to Oklahoma City.
- On December 16, 2022, Luguentz Dort passed James Harden on the Thunder's all-time most three-pointers.
- Josh Giddey and Jalen Williams became the 12th and 13th Thunder player to be named a Rising Star.
- Shai Gilgeous-Alexander joins Kevin Durant, Russell Westbrook, Paul George, and Chris Paul as the fifth Thunder player to be named an All-Star since the franchise moved to Oklahoma City.
- Jalen Williams joins Kevin Durant and Russell Westbrook as the third Thunder rookie to have three games with at least 25 points, 5 rebounds, and 5 assists in a season.
- On April 12, 2023, Shai Gilgeous-Alexander and Josh Giddey became the youngest pair of teammates to each score 30 or more points in an elimination game in play-in and playoffs history.
- Jalen Williams joins Russell Westbrook as the second Thunder player to be named to an All-Rookie First Team since the franchise moved to Oklahoma City.
- Shai Gilgeous-Alexander joins Kevin Durant, Russell Westbrook and Paul George as the fourth Thunder player to be named to an All-NBA First Team and the fifth Thunder player to be named to an All-NBA Team overall since the franchise moved to Oklahoma City.

=== Statistical ===
- Shai Gilgeous-Alexander finished fourth in the league in points per game with 31.4 points a game.
- Isaiah Joe finished twenty-fifth in the league in three point percentage at 40.9% from three.
- Shai Gilgeous-Alexander finished fifth in the league in free throw percentage at 90.5% from the free throw line.
- Jaylin Williams led the league in total charges drawn with 43.

== Injuries ==
Player	Duration		Injury	Games missed
Player	Start	End	Injury	Games missed
Chet Holmgren	August 25, 2022	2023 Summer League	Right foot surgery	82 (+2) (Note: Holmgren missed 2 play-in games)
Jalen Williams	October 22, 2022	October 29, 2022	Right orbital bone fracture	4
Shai Gilgeous-Alexander	October 23, 2022	October 25, 2022	Left hip contusion	1
Josh Giddey	October 25, 2022	November 1, 2022	Right ankle sprain	3
Aleksej Pokuševski	November 5, 2022	November 9, 2022	Right shoulder bursitis	2
Darius Bazley	November 11, 2022	November 21, 2022	Right ankle sprain	5
Tre Mann	November 14, 2022	November 21, 2022	Low back soreness	3
Isaiah Joe	November 18, 2022	November 21, 2022	Right knee soreness	1
Aleksej Pokuševski	November 21, 2022	November 23, 2022	Left ankle sprain	1
Mike Muscala	November 23, 2022	December 3, 2022	Left pinky fracture	5
Shai Gilgeous-Alexander	November 30, 2022	December 3, 2022	Left hip contusion	1
Kenrich Williams	December 5, 2022	December 17, 2022	Right knee sprain	6
Luguentz Dort	December 7, 2022	December 10, 2022	Left knee contusion	1
Jeremiah Robinson-Earl	December 14, 2022	February 1, 2023	Right ankle sprain	23
Darius Bazley	December 16, 2022	December 21, 2022	Illness	3
Ousmane Dieng	December 16, 2022	January 20, 2023	Right wrist fracture	17
Josh Giddey	December 16, 2022	December 21, 2022	Illness	3
Shai Gilgeous-Alexander	December 16, 2022	December 19, 2022	Lower back contusion	1
Jaylin Williams	December 23, 2022	December 27, 2022	Concussion	1
Aleksej Pokuševski	December 29, 2022	March 11, 2023	Left tibial plateau	32
Shai Gilgeous-Alexander	January 3, 2023	January 4, 2023	Illness	1
Jaylin Williams	January 4, 2023	January 8, 2023	Left ankle sprain	1
Isaiah Joe	January 13, 2023	January 15, 2023	G/I symptoms	1
Eugene Omoruyi	January 15, 2023	January 18, 2023	Low back soreness	1
Luguentz Dort	January 27, 2023	February 10, 2023	Right hamstring strain	6
Eugene Omoruyi	February 13, 2023	February 15, 2023	Left ankle sprain	1
Shai Gilgeous-Alexander	February 24, 2023	March 5, 2023	Abdominal strain/Health and safety protocols	5
Kenrich Williams	March 1, 2023	2023 Offseason	Left wrist surgery	21 (+2) (Note: Williams missed 2 play-in games)
Jalen Williams	March 7, 2023	March 11, 2023	Right wrist sprain	2
Shai Gilgeous-Alexander	March 8, 2023	March 11, 2023	Abdominal strain/Injury management	1
Shai Gilgeous-Alexander	March 12, 2023	March 14, 2023	Abdominal strain/Injury management	1
Lindy Waters III	March 26, 2023	March 31, 2023	Left foot plantar fasciitis	3
Shai Gilgeous-Alexander	March 28, 2023	March 31, 2023	Left ankle sprain	2
Aleksej Pokuševski	April 4, 2023	April 14, 2023	Left knee contusion	3 (+2) (Note: Pokuševski missed 2 play-in games)
Luguentz Dort	April 9, 2023	April 12, 2023	Right shoulder strain	1
Josh Giddey	April 9, 2023	April 12, 2023	Rest	1
Shai Gilgeous-Alexander	April 9, 2023	April 12, 2023	Abdominal strain/Injury management	1
Jalen Williams	April 9, 2023	April 12, 2023	Right wrist strain	1
Jaylin Williams	April 9, 2023	April 12, 2023	Low back soreness	1

a: Chet Holmgren sustained a Lisfranc injury in his right foot prior to the start of the season and missed the entire 2022-23 season.
b: Kenrich Williams sustained a scapholunate ligament rupture in his left wrist and missed the rest of the 2022-23 season.

=== G League assignments ===
Player	Duration	
Player	Start	End
Ousmane Dieng	October 28, 2022	October 29, 2022
Jaylin Williams	October 28, 2022	October 29, 2022
Ousmane Dieng	October 30, 2022	October 30, 2022
Jaylin Williams	October 30, 2022	November 1, 2022
Jaylin Williams	November 3, 2022	November 5, 2022
Jaylin Williams	November 8, 2022	November 11, 2022
Ousmane Dieng	November 8, 2022	November 25, 2022
Jaylin Williams	November 20, 2022	November 21, 2022
Jaylin Williams	December 1, 2022	December 15, 2022
Ousmane Dieng	December 6, 2022	December 15, 2022
Jaylin Williams	December 12, 2022	December 15, 2022
Jaylin Williams	December 18, 2022	December 12, 2022
Tre Mann	December 18, 2022	December 23, 2022
Jaylin Williams	December 26, 2022	December 28, 2022
Ousmane Dieng	January 19, 2023	January 22, 2023
Jeremiah Robinson-Earl	January 31, 2023	February 1, 2023
Jeremiah Robinson-Earl	February 3, 2023	February 13, 2023
Ousmane Dieng	February 6, 2023	February 15, 2023
Tre Mann	February 13, 2023	February 13, 2023
Tre Mann	February 14, 2023	February 14, 2023
Tre Mann	February 15, 2023	February 15, 2023
Aaron Wiggins	February 15, 2023	February 15, 2023
Ousmane Dieng	February 22, 2023	March 3, 2023
Aaron Wiggins	February 25, 2023	February 26, 2023
Lindy Waters III	February 28, 2023	February 28, 2023
Lindy Waters III	March 2, 2023	March 5, 2023
Aleksej Pokuševski	March 6, 2023	March 6, 2023
Aleksej Pokuševski	March 11, 2023	March 24, 2023

Source: NBA G League Transactions

== Transactions ==
=== Overview ===
Players Added

Via draft

- Chet Holmgren
- Jalen Williams
- Jaylin Williams

Via trade

- Ousmane Dieng
  (Draft rights)

Via free agency

- Isaiah Joe
- Eugene Omoruyi
Players Lost

Via trade

- Derrick Favors
- Ty Jerome
- Théo Maledon
- Vít Krejčí

Via free agency

- Melvin Frazier Jr.

Waived

- Isaiah Roby

=== Trades ===
June 23, 2022
To Oklahoma City Thunder

JaMychal Green
2027 first-round pick
To Denver Nuggets

Draft rights to Peyton Watson
Two future second-round draft picks
June 23, 2022
To Oklahoma City Thunder

Draft rights to Ousmane Dieng
To New York Knicks

Three protected 2023 first-round draft picks
September 27, 2022
To Oklahoma City Thunder

Maurice Harkless
2029 second-round pick
Amended conditions on previously traded 2025 second-round pick
To Atlanta Hawks

Vít Krejčí
September 30, 2022
To Oklahoma City Thunder

Sterling Brown
Trey Burke
Marquese Chriss
David Nwaba
To Houston Rockets

Derrick Favors
Maurice Harkless
Ty Jerome
Théo Maledon
2026 second-round pick
Cash considerations

February 9, 2023

To Oklahoma City Thunder

Dario Šarić
2029 second-round pick
Cash considerations
To Phoenix Suns

Darius Bazley

February 9, 2023

To Oklahoma City Thunder

Justin Jackson
2023 second-round pick
2029 second-round pick
To Boston Celtics

Mike Muscala

=== Free agency ===
==== Re-signed ====
Date	Player	Contract
July 6, 2022	Luguentz Dort	Multi-Year Contract
July 20, 2022	Kenrich Williams	Multi-Year Extension
August 4, 2022	Mike Muscala	Multi-Year Contract
In-Season Re-Signings
February 10, 2023	Eugene Omoruyi	Multi-Year Contract
February 27, 2023	Lindy Waters III	Multi-Year Contract

c: Eugene Omoruyi initially signed a two-way contract before it was converted into a multi-year contract.
d: Lindy Waters III initially signed a two-way contract before it was converted into a multi-year contract.

==== Additions ====
Date	Player	Contract	Former team
July 2, 2022	Eugene Omoruyi	Two-Way	Dallas Mavericks
October 16, 2022	Isaiah Joe	Multi-Year	Philadelphia 76ers
In-Season Additions
February 12, 2023	Olivier Sarr	Two-Way	Oklahoma City Blue (G League)
March 3, 2023	Jared Butler	Two-Way	Grand Rapids Gold (G League)

==== Subtractions ====
Date	Player	Reason left	New team
June 30, 2022	Melvin Frazier Jr.	Free agent	Raptors 905 (G League)
July 3, 2022	Isaiah Roby	Waived	San Antonio Spurs
July 20, 2022	JaMychal Green	Waived	Golden State Warriors
October 2, 2022	Sterling Brown	Waived	Raptors 905 (G League)
October 17, 2022	Trey Burke	Waived	Stockton Kings (G League)
October 17, 2022	Marquese Chriss	Waived	Wisconsin Herd (G League)
October 17, 2022	David Nwaba	Waived	Motor City Cruise (G League)
In-Season Subtractions
February 10, 2023	Justin Jackson	Waived	Texas Legends (G League)
February 26, 2023	Eugene Omoruyi	Waived	Detroit Pistons

== G League ==
Notable roster changes

Additions

- On July 2, the Thunder signed Eugene Omoruyi to a two-way contract
- On October 12, the Blue signed Robert Woodard II
- On October 15, the Blue signed Abdul Gaddy
- On October 18, the Blue signed Adam Mokoka
- On October 18, the Blue signed Scotty Hopson
- On October 20, the Blue signed Jahmi'us Ramsey
- On January 31, the Blue acquired André Roberson
- On February 12, the Thunder signed Olivier Sarr to a two-way contract
- On March 3, the Thunder signed Jared Butler to a two-way contract

Trades

- On September 1, the Blue traded Rob Edwards
- On September 23, the Blue traded Zavier Simpson
- On October 21, the Blue traded Justin Jaworski
- On February 11, the Blue traded for Chasson Randle
- On February 12, the Blue traded D. J. Wilson

Subtractions

- On October 25, Melvin Frazier Jr. signed with the Raptors 905
- On February 10, the Thunder converted Eugene Omoruyi to a standard contract
- On February 27, the Thunder converted Lindy Waters III to a standard contract

Assignments

- Ousmane Dieng, Tre Mann, Aleksej Pokuševski, Jeremiah Robinson-Earl, Lindy Waters III, Aaron Wiggins, Jaylin Williams
Source: NBA G League Transactions

The Oklahoma City Blue started their 9th season of the franchise in Oklahoma City and their 22nd season in the NBA G League. Last season, the Blue finished 15-20 and failed to make the playoffs after becoming the runner-ups in the 2021 Winter Showcase.

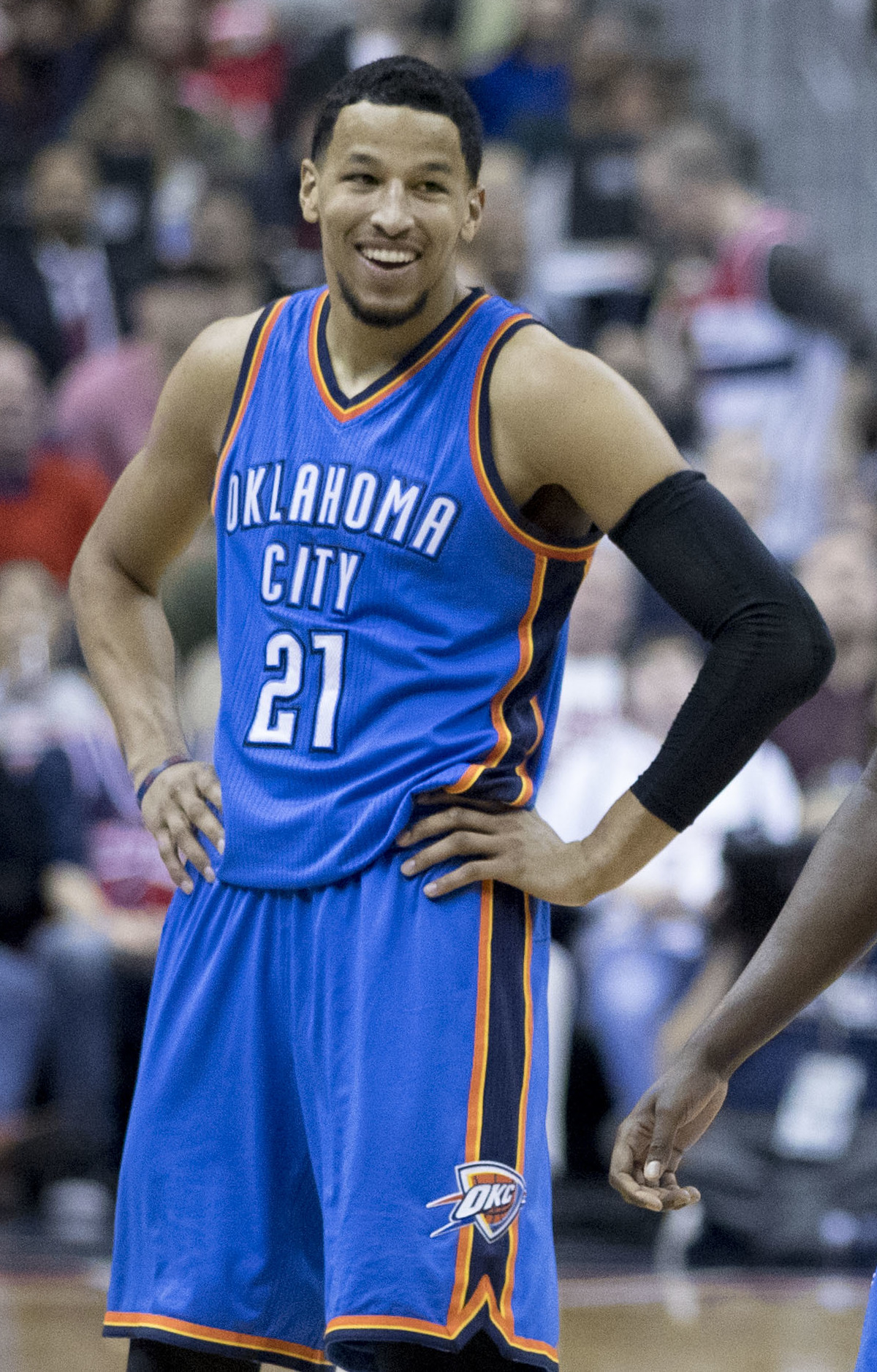
André Roberson joins the Blue after seven seasons with the Thunder.

On September 23, 2022, the Thunder named Kameron Woods the new head coach of the Blue, becoming the third head coach since the franchise relocated from Tulsa. Woods replaced Grant Gibbs following his promotion to the Thunder. Gibbs joins current head coach Mark Daigneault and Darko Rajaković as the third Blue head coach to join the Thunder coaching staff.

To fill in the open two-way spot left by Melvin Frazier Jr., the Thunder signed Eugene Omoruyi to a two-way contract. Omoruyi joined Lindy Waters III on a two-way after spending part of the 2021-22 season with the Dallas Mavericks. On February 10, the Thunder converted Omoruyi's contract into a standard, becoming the fifth Thunder player to have their two-way converted. To replace Omoruyi, the Thunder signed Olivier Sarr who spent part of the last season with the Thunder. After waiving Omoruyi sixteen days after re-signing to a standard, the Thunder converted Lindy Waters III into a standard. Replacing Waters III was Jared Butler who began the season with the Grand Rapids Gold.

Throughout the season, the Thunder sent down Ousmane Dieng, Tre Mann, Aleksej Pokuševski, Jeremiah Robinson-Earl, Lindy Waters III, Aaron Wiggins, and Jaylin Williams on G League assignments. On February 1, 2023, the Blue acquired André Roberson after it was reported that Roberson had been practicing with the Blue last month. Roberson spent seven seasons with the Thunder and became one of the top defenders in the league including an All-Defensive team in 2017. During the 2017-18 season, Roberson suffered a patellar tendon and was sidelined for the remainder of the season and the following season. Roberson's last stint was with the Brooklyn Nets during the 2020-21 season.

Under Kameron Woods, the Blue finished the season 13-19 and missed the G League playoffs for the fourth consecutive year.
