= David Akinyooye =

American basketball coach (born 1989)

Oklahoma City Thunder
- Title: Assistant coach
- League: NBA

Personal information
- Born: September 29, 1989 (age 37) Elmont, New York, U.S.
- Listed height: 6 ft 6 in (1.98 m)
- Listed weight: 210 lb (95 kg)

Career information
- High school: Elmont Memorial (Elmont, New York)
- College: Adelphi (2007–2011)
- NBA draft: 2011: undrafted
- Playing career: 2011–2012
- Position: Guard
- Coaching career: 2012–present

Career history

Playing
- 2011–2012: Springfield Armor

Coaching
- 2012–2013: New York Knicks (coaching associate)
- 2013–2014: San Antonio Spurs (player development)
- 2014–2015: ASVEL Lyon-Villeurbanne (assistant)
- 2015–2019: Oklahoma City Blue (assistant)
- 2019–present: Oklahoma City Thunder (assistant)

Career highlights
- As assistant coach: NBA champion (2025)

David Akinyooye (/ˌɑːkɪnˈjɔɪeɪ/ AH-kin-YOY-ay; born September 29, 1989) is an American professional basketball coach who is currently an assistant coach with the Oklahoma City Thunder of the National Basketball Association. He played college basketball for the Adelphi Panthers. He spent one season playing professional basketball for the Springfield Armor before transitioning into a coaching position with the New York Knicks.

== College career ==
Akinyooye spent four seasons as a member of the Adelphi Panthers. As a senior, he finished second in total scoring with 318 points while leading the Panthers in rebounding and blocks. On January 25, 2011, Akinyooye had a career-high 20 rebounds against Franklin Pierce. Akinyooye finished the season ranked fourth in the Northeast-10 Conference with 8.9 rebounds and 1.4 blocks per game during conference play. He was later named to the All-Met Division II Men's College Basketball First Team.

== Professional career ==
=== Springfield Armor (2011–2012) ===
After going undrafted in the 2011 NBA draft, Akinyooye joined the Springfield Armor for the 2011–12 NBA D League season. On December 8, 2011, Akinyooye recorded a career-high 12 points and 7 rebounds in a 97–89 win against the Maine Red Claws. On January 20, 2012, Akinyooye was waived by the Armor but was later claimed by the Armor three months later. However, Akinyooye's professional career ended after the Armor waived him again on March 14, 2012.

== Coaching career ==
After one season of professional basketball, Akinyooye joined the New York Knicks as a coaching workout associate during the 2012-13 NBA season. Akinyooye later joined the San Antonio Spurs as a player development quality assurance assistant for the 2013-14 NBA season. Former Chicago Bulls head coach Jim Boylen, who worked with Akinyooye in San Antonio, remarked that Akinyooye "wasn't scared" and that he "dove right in." After two stints in the National Basketball Association, Akinyooye joined ASVEL Lyon-Villeurbanne as an assistant where former Spurs Tony Parker had become a majority shareholder.

After a season with ASVEL Lyon-Villeurbanne, Akinyooye joined the Oklahoma City Blue of the NBA D-League as an assistant coach. In his first season with the Blue, Akinyooye helped lead the Blue to a league's best 34–16 record under head coach Mark Daigneault. After four seasons with the Blue, the Oklahoma City Thunder named Akinyooye as an assistant coach for the 2019-20 NBA season.

Akinyooye served as the Thunder's Summer League head coach for the 2023 NBA Summer League in Utah for the Salt Lake City Summer League. Under him, the Thunder finished with a 2–1 record with guard Tre Mann leading the league in scoring.

== Career statistics ==
Legend
GP	Games played	GS	Games started	MPG	Minutes per game
FG%	Field goal percentage	3P%	3-point field goal percentage	FT%	Free throw percentage
RPG	Rebounds per game	APG	Assists per game	SPG	Steals per game
BPG	Blocks per game	PPG	Points per game	**Bold**	Career high

=== NBA G League ===
Year	Team	GP	GS	MPG	FG%	3P%	FT%	RPG	APG	SPG	BPG	PPG
2011–12	Springfield	20	0	14.2	.429	.214	.700	2.9	.2	.2	.3	4.5
Career		20	0	14.2	.429	.214	.700	2.9	.2	.2	.3	4.5
