= Eugene Omoruyi =

Canadian basketball player (born 1997)

- Omoruyi with Beşiktaş in 2026

No. 20 – Beşiktaş Fuzul
- Position: Small forward / power forward
- League: BSL; EuroLeague

Personal information
- Born: February 14, 1997 (age 29) Benin City, Nigeria
- Listed height: 6 ft 6 in (1.98 m)
- Listed weight: 235 lb (107 kg)

Career information
- High school: Monsignor Percy Johnson (Toronto, Ontario); Orangeville Prep (Orangeville, Ontario)
- College: Rutgers (2016–2019); Oregon (2020–2021)
- NBA draft: 2021: undrafted
- Playing career: 2021–present

Career history
- 2021: Dallas Mavericks
- 2021: →Texas Legends
- 2022–2023: Oklahoma City Thunder
- 2022–2023: →Oklahoma City Blue
- 2023: Detroit Pistons
- 2023–2024: Washington Wizards
- 2023–2024: →Capital City Go-Go
- 2024–2025: Raptors 905
- 2025: Al-Nasr
- 2025–2026: Baskonia
- 2026–present: Beşiktaş

Career highlights
- Spanish Cup winner (2026); First-team All-Pac-12 (2021)
- Stats at NBA.com
- Stats at Basketball Reference

Eugene Tanwa Omoruyi (born February 14, 1997) is a Nigerian-Canadian professional basketball player for Beşiktaş of the Basketbol Süper Ligi (BSL) and the EuroLeague. He played college basketball for the Rutgers Scarlet Knights and the Oregon Ducks.

== Early life ==
Omoruyi was born in Benin City, Nigeria and immigrated to Canada with his family as a one-year-old. He grew up playing soccer and began playing basketball during his second year at Monsignor Percy Johnson Catholic High School. Omoruyi attended Orangeville Prep in Orangeville, Ontario, averaging 16.9 points and 9.6 rebounds per game and earning Ontario Scholastic Basketball Association First Team All-Star honours in his final season. He played alongside Jamal Murray and Thon Maker. He competed for Advantage Titans on the Amateur Athletic Union circuit. Omoruyi committed to playing college basketball for Rutgers over an offer from Loyola (Illinois).

== College career ==
As a freshman at Rutgers, Omoruyi averaged 2.4 points and 2.2 rebounds per game. On November 28, 2017, he scored a sophomore season-high 22 points in a 78–73 loss to Florida State. As a sophomore, Omoruyi averaged 7.9 points and five rebounds per game. For his junior season, he was named a team co-captain. During the offseason, he improved his shooting by taking 1,000 shots for six mornings per week. On November 11, 2018, he recorded a junior season-high 24 points and 10 rebounds in a 95–66 win over Drexel. On November 23, Omoruyi posted 20 points and 17 rebounds in a 54–44 win over Boston University. He averaged 13.8 points, 7.2 rebounds and 2.4 assists per game as a junior. He was an All-Big Ten Honorable Mention and Second Team All-Met selection.

For his senior season, Omoruyi transferred to Oregon and sat out for his next season due to National Collegiate Athletic Association transfer rules. His decision to transfer from Rutgers was described by the media as unexpected. On December 2, 2020, he made his debut for Oregon and recorded a career-high 31 points and 11 rebounds in an 83–75 loss to Missouri. As a senior, he averaged 17.1 points, 5.4 rebounds, 2.3 assists and 1.5 steals per game, earning First Team All-Pac-12 honors. Following the season, Omoruyi declared for the 2021 NBA draft.

== Professional career ==
=== Dallas Mavericks (2021) ===
After going undrafted in the 2021 NBA draft, Omoruyi signed a two-way contract with the Dallas Mavericks on August 13, 2021, splitting time with their G League affiliate, the Texas Legends. On December 15, he suffered a season-ending injury while playing with the Legends, and on December 26, he was waived by the Mavericks.

=== Oklahoma City Thunder (2022–2023) ===
On July 2, 2022, Omoruyi signed a two-way contract with the Oklahoma City Thunder. His contract was converted to a multi-year deal on February 10, 2023. On February 26, Omoruyi was waived by the Thunder.

=== Detroit Pistons (2023) ===
On March 3, 2023, Omoruyi signed a 10-day contract with the Detroit Pistons. On March 13, he signed a second 10-day contract with the Pistons. On March 23, Omoruyi signed a rest-of-season contract with the Pistons.

On June 29, 2023, the Detroit Pistons exercised Omoruyi's team option for the 2023–24 NBA season. He was waived two days later.

=== Washington Wizards / Capital City Go-Go (2023–2024) ===
On July 12, 2023, Omoruyi signed a two-way contract with the Washington Wizards and on March 1, 2024, he signed a standard contract with the Wizards.

On August 21, 2024, Omoruyi was waived by the Wizards.

On September 25, 2024, Omoruyi signed with the Minnesota Timberwolves, but was waived on October 18.

=== Raptors 905 (2024–2025) ===
On November 21, 2024, Omoruyi joined Raptors 905 and on January 8, 2025, he signed a 10-day contract with the Toronto Raptors. On January 17, his 10-day contract with the Raptors expired without seeing minutes with Toronto, only playing with the 905 after being assigned twice. Two days later, he rejoined Raptors 905.

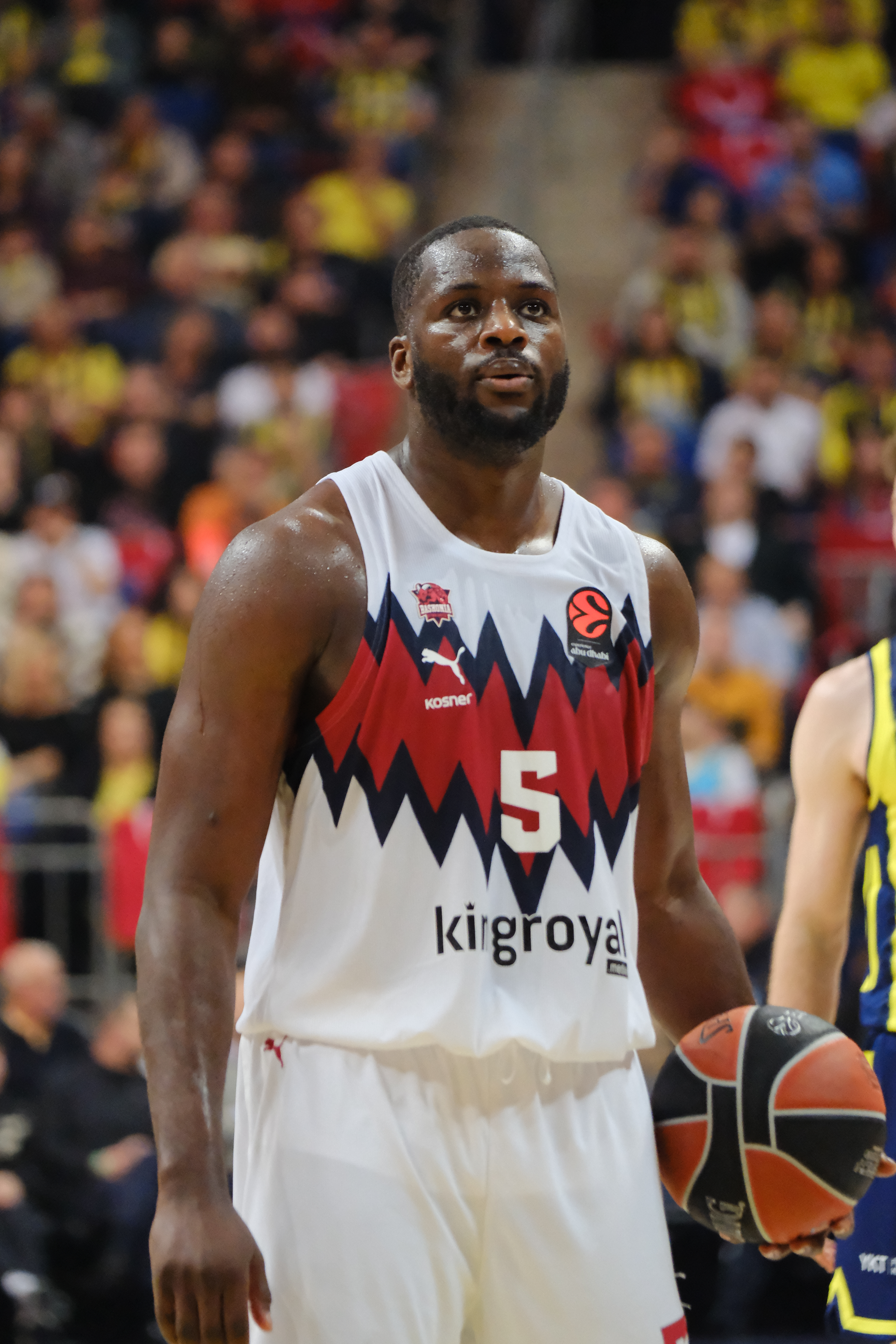
Omoruyi with Baskonia in 2026

=== Baskonia (2025–2026) ===
On December 10, 2025, Omoruyi signed a 2 month contract with Baskonia of the Liga ACB and EuroLeague. He would be a short-term replacement for Tadas Sedekerskis.

=== Beşiktaş ===
On 15 July 2026, Omoruyi signed with Beşiktaş of the Basketbol Süper Ligi (BSL).

== Career statistics ==
Legend
GP	Games played	GS	Games started	MPG	Minutes per game
FG%	Field goal percentage	3P%	3-point field goal percentage	FT%	Free throw percentage
RPG	Rebounds per game	APG	Assists per game	SPG	Steals per game
BPG	Blocks per game	PPG	Points per game	**Bold**	Career high

=== NBA ===
==== Regular season ====
Year	Team	GP	GS	MPG	FG%	3P%	FT%	RPG	APG	SPG	BPG	PPG
2021–22	Dallas	4	0	4.5	.400	**.500**	.500	1.8	.5	.0	.0	1.8
2022–23	Oklahoma City	23	2	11.8	.468	.258	.607	2.3	.5	.6	.0	4.9
2022–23	Detroit	17	**4**	**21.9**	.425	.293	**.723**	**3.5**	**1.0**	**.8**	**.2**	**9.7**
2023–24	Washington	**43**	0	9.1	**.485**	.283	.653	2.0	.8	.6	.1	4.8
Career		87	6	12.1	.460	.285	.664	2.3	.7	.6	.1	5.7

=== College ===
Year	Team	GP	GS	MPG	FG%	3P%	FT%	RPG	APG	SPG	BPG	PPG
2016–17	Rutgers	**33**	11	12.0	.349	.000	.625	2.2	1.0	.5	.3	2.4
2017–18	Rutgers	32	7	21.7	**.473**	.000	.541	5.0	1.0	.9	**.8**	7.9
2018–19	Rutgers	28	26	29.2	.445	.311	.714	**7.2**	**2.4**	.7	.3	13.8
2019–20	Oregon	Redshirt										
2020–21	Oregon	28	**28**	**30.6**	**.473**	**.376**	**.765**	5.4	2.3	**1.5**	.6	**17.1**
Career		121	72	22.8	.453	.324	.674	4.8	1.6	.9	.5	9.9
