= Rebound rate =

Basketball statistic

In basketball statistics, rebound rate or rebound percentage is a statistic to gauge how effective a player is at gaining possession of the basketball after a missed field goal or free throw. Rebound rate is an estimate of the percentage of missed shots a player rebounded while he was on the floor. Using raw rebound totals to evaluate rebounding fails to take into account external factors unrelated to a player's ability, such as the number of shots taken in games and the percentage of those shots that are made. Both factors affect the number of missed shots that are available to be rebounded. Rebound rate takes these factors into account.

The formula are:

$\text{Rebound Rate} = \dfrac{100 \times\text{Rebounds}\times \dfrac{\text{Team Minutes Played}}{5}}{\text{Minutes Played}\times \left (\text{Team Total Rebounds} + \text{Opposing Team Total Rebounds}\right )}$

$\text{Offensive Rebound Rate} = \dfrac{100 \times\text{Offensive Rebounds}\times \dfrac{\text{Team Minutes Played}}{5}}{\text{Minutes Played}\times \left (\text{Team Offensive Rebounds} + \text{Opposing Team Defensive Rebounds}\right )}$

$\text{Defensive Rebound Rate} = \dfrac{100 \times\text{Defensive Rebounds}\times \dfrac{\text{Team Minutes Played}}{5}}{\text{Minutes Played}\times \left (\text{Team Defensive Rebounds} + \text{Opposing Team Offensive Rebounds}\right )}$

== Leaders ==
In the National Basketball Association (NBA), the statistic is available for seasons since the 1970–71 season. The highest career rebound rate by a player is 24.98, by Andre Drummond. The highest rebound rate for one season is 29.73, also by Dennis Rodman, which he achieved during the 1994–95 season. He also owned seven of the top ten rebound percentage seasons (four of the top five) in NBA history, all time. Dennis Rodman led the league in Rebound rate a record eight times. Marcus Camby, Andre Drummond, and Moses Malone each led the league four times. Reggie Evans, Danny Fortson, DeAndre Jordan, Larry Smith, Clifford Ray, Roy Tarpley, and Bill Walton each led the league two times.

=== Year-by-year ===
^	Denotes player who is still active in the NBA
*	Inducted into the Naismith Memorial Basketball Hall of Fame
†	Denotes player whose team won championship that year
Player (X)	Denotes the number of times the player had been named MVP at that time
Team (X)	Denotes the number of times a player from this team had won at that time

Season	Player	Position	Rebound Pct	Team
1970–71	Tom Boerwinkle	Center	22.60	Chicago Bulls
1971–72	Clifford Ray	Center / power forward	22.13	Chicago Bulls
1972–73	Clifford Ray (2)	Center / power forward	19.85	Chicago Bulls
1973–74	Zaid Abdul-Aziz	Power forward / center	20.06	Houston Rockets
1974–75	Happy Hairston	Forward	19.82	Baltimore / Capital / Washington Bullets
1975–76	Bill Walton*	Center	20.59	Portland Trail Blazers
1976–77	Moses Malone*	Center	23.38	Buffalo Braves / Houston Rockets
1977–78	Moses Malone* (2)	Center	22.30	Houston Rockets
1978–79	Moses Malone* (3)	Center	23.21	Houston Rockets
1979–80	Swen Nater	Center	22.98	Buffalo Braves / San Diego Clippers
1980–81	Larry Smith	Power forward	21.38	Golden State Warriors
1981–82	Buck Williams	Power forward	20.10	New Jersey Nets
1982–83	Moses Malone* (4)	Center	21.56	Philadelphia 76ers
1983–84	LaSalle Thompson	Center / power forward	21.11	Kansas City / Sacramento Kings
1984–85	Bill Walton* (2)	Center	20.17	San Diego / Los Angeles Clippers
1985–86	Charles Oakley	Power forward	21.18	Chicago Bulls
1986–87	Larry Smith (2)	Power forward	21.14	Golden State Warriors
1987–88	Roy Tarpley	Power forward / center	22.59	Dallas Mavericks
1988–89	Robert Parish*	Center	20.13	Boston Celtics
1989–90	Roy Tarpley (2)	Power forward / center	20.27	Dallas Mavericks
1990–91	Dennis Rodman*	Power forward / small forward	21.34	Detroit Pistons
1991–92	Dennis Rodman* (2)	Power forward / small forward	26.19	Detroit Pistons
1992–93	Dennis Rodman* (3)	Power forward / small forward	25.99	Detroit Pistons
1993–94	Dennis Rodman* (4)	Power forward / small forward	25.74	San Antonio Spurs
1994–95	Dennis Rodman* (5)	Power forward / small forward	29.73	San Antonio Spurs
1995–96	Dennis Rodman* (6)	Power forward / small forward	26.56	Chicago Bulls
1996–97	Dennis Rodman* (7)	Power forward / small forward	25.61	Chicago Bulls
1997–98	Dennis Rodman* (8)	Power forward / small forward	24.08	Chicago Bulls
1998–99	Danny Fortson	Power forward / center	23.70	Denver Nuggets
1999–2000	Jerome Williams	Power forward	21.73	Detroit Pistons
2000–01	Dikembe Mutombo*	Center	21.93	Atlanta Hawks
2001–02	Danny Fortson (2)	Power forward / center	21.76	Golden State Warriors
2002–03	Ben Wallace*	Center	23.24	Detroit Pistons
2003–04	Erick Dampier	Center	20.80	Golden State Warriors
2004–05	Reggie Evans	Power forward	23.95	Seattle SuperSonics
2005–06	Marcus Camby	Center	21.01	Denver Nuggets
2006–07	Tyson Chandler	Center	20.68	New Orleans Hornets (Note: During the 2005–06 and 2006–07 seasons, the team was known as the New Orleans/Oklahoma City Hornets during their temporary relocation to Oklahoma City due to Hurricane Katrina.)
2007–08	Dwight Howard*	Center	21.67	Orlando Magic
2008–09	Joel Przybilla	Center	22.78	Portland Trail Blazers
2009–10	Marcus Camby (2)	Center	22.25	Los Angeles Clippers / Portland Trail Blazers
2010–11	Marcus Camby (3)	Center	24.06	Portland Trail Blazers
2011–12	Marcus Camby (4)	Center	22.82	Portland Trail Blazers
2012–13	Reggie Evans (2)	Power forward	26.67	Brooklyn Nets
2013–14	Andre Drummond^	Center	22.33	Detroit Pistons
2014–15	DeAndre Jordan^	center	24.47	Los Angeles Clippers
2015–16	Andre Drummond^ (2)	Center	24.52	Detroit Pistons
2016–17	Andre Drummond^ (3)	Center	25.24	Detroit Pistons
2017–18	DeAndre Jordan^ (2)	center	26.53	Los Angeles Clippers
2018–19	Hassan Whiteside	Center	25.94	Miami Heat
2019–20	Andre Drummond^ (4)	Center	26.04	Detroit Pistons
2020–21	Clint Capela^	Center	26.06	Atlanta Hawks
2021–22	Rudy Gobert^	Center	25.00	Utah Jazz
2022–23	Jonas Valančiūnas^	Center	23.15	New Orleans Pelicans
2023–24	Jusuf Nurkić^	Center	22.76	Phoenix Suns
2024–25	Domantas Sabonis^	Center / Power forward	22.42	Sacramento Kings
2025–26	Donovan Clingan^	Center	23.08	Portland Trail Blazers

== Multiple-time leaders ==
Rank	Player	Team	Times leader	Years
1	Dennis Rodman	Detroit Pistons (3) / San Antonio Spurs (2) / Chicago Bulls (3)	8	1990–91, 1991–92, 1992–93, 1993–94, 1994–95, 1995–96, 1996–97, 1997–98
2	Marcus Camby	Los Angeles Clippers (1) / Portland Trail Blazers (3)	4	2005–06, 2009–10, 2010–11, 2011–12
2	Andre Drummond	Detroit Pistons	4	2013–14, 2015–16, 2016–17, 2019–20
2	Moses Malone	Buffalo Braves/Houston Rockets (3) / Philadelphia 76ers (1)	4	1976–77, 1977–78, 1978–79, 1982–83
5	Reggie Evans	Seattle SuperSonics (1) / Brooklyn Nets (1)	2	2004–05, 2012–13
5	Danny Fortson	Denver Nuggets (1) / Golden State Warriors (1)	2	1998–99, 2001–02
5	DeAndre Jordan	Los Angeles Clippers	2	2014–15, 2017–18
5	Larry Smith	Golden State Warriors	2	1980–81, 1986–87
5	Clifford Ray	Chicago Bulls	2	1971–72, 1972–73
5	Roy Tarpley	Dallas Mavericks	2	1987–88, 1989–90
5	Bill Walton	Portland Trail Blazers (1) / San Diego / Los Angeles Clippers (1)	2	1975–76, 1984–85

== See also ==
- NBA records
- Basketball statistics
