= Mark Daigneault =

American basketball coach (born 1985)

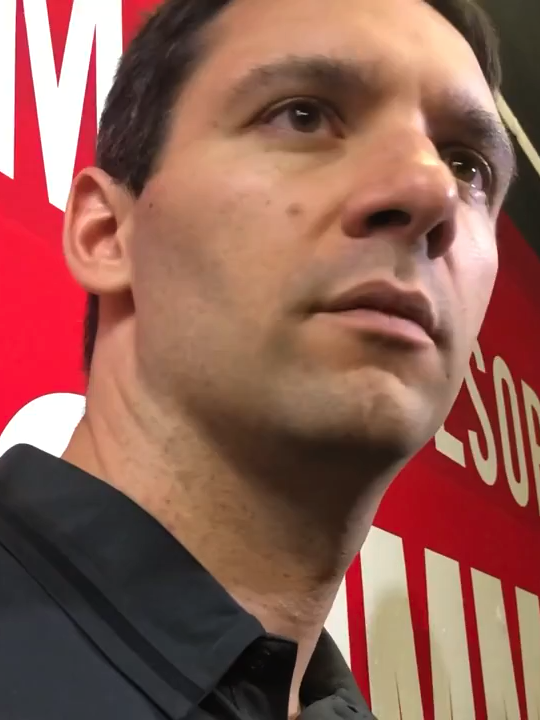
- Daigneault in 2018

Oklahoma City Thunder
- Position: Head coach
- League: NBA

Personal information
- Born: February 23, 1985 (age 41) Leominster, Massachusetts, U.S.

Career information
- High school: Leominster (Leominster, Massachusetts)
- College: Connecticut; Florida
- Coaching career: 2007–present

Career history

Coaching
- 2007–2010: Holy Cross (assistant)
- 2010–2014: Florida (assistant)
- 2014–2019: Oklahoma City Blue
- 2016: →Oklahoma City Thunder (assistant)
- 2019–2020: Oklahoma City Thunder (assistant)
- 2020–present: Oklahoma City Thunder

Career highlights
- NBA champion (2025); NBA Coach of the Year (2024); NBCA Coach of the Year (2024); NBA All-Star Game head coach (2025)

Mark Francis Daigneault (/ˈdeɪɡnɔːlt/ DAYG-nawlt; born February 23, 1985) is an American professional basketball coach who is the head coach for the Oklahoma City Thunder of the National Basketball Association (NBA).

Daigneault began his coaching career in 2007 as an assistant for Holy Cross and Florida before joining the Thunder organization in 2014. He spent five seasons as the head coach for the Oklahoma City Blue, the Thunder's G-League affiliate, before becoming the head coach for the Thunder in November 2020. He was named NBA Coach of the Year for the 2023–24 season. The following year, he led the Thunder to a franchise record 68 wins and won the 2025 NBA Finals.

== Early life ==
Mark Daigneault was born on February 23, 1985, in Leominster, Massachusetts. He attended Leominster High School. Daigneault is of French-Canadian descent via his great-grandfather, a native of Quebec.

== Coaching career ==
While attending the University of Connecticut, Daigneault served as a student manager for the UConn Huskies from 2003 to 2007 under Jim Calhoun. After earning his bachelor's degree in education, Daigneault initially intended to go for a master's degree, but was urged by Calhoun and associate head coach George Blaney to pursue an assistant coaching position at Holy Cross, giving Daigneault strong recommendations. During Daigneault's tenure, the Crusaders finished as runner-up of the Patriot League Championship in the 2008–09 season.

After three seasons with Holy Cross, Daigneault enrolled at the University of Florida for graduate school, where he joined future Thunder head coach Billy Donovan as an assistant working for the Florida Gators. After graduating with a sports management degree, Daigneault became the assistant to the head coach which involved scouting and working with players off the court. During Daigneault's tenure, the Gators had a record of 120–30 which included three SEC titles and an Elite Eight appearance each year. He also assisted Donovan during his time coaching USA Basketball.

=== Oklahoma City Blue (2014–2019) ===
On August 22, 2014, the Oklahoma City Thunder named Daigneault the new head coach of the Oklahoma City Blue following Darko Rajaković's promotion to the Thunder coaching staff. Florida's head coach Billy Donovan, who worked with Daigneault for four seasons, remarked that Daigneault "has been a valuable member of our staff." In Daigneault's first season with the Blue, the Blue tied its highest win total with 28 since the 2010–11 season which included a playoff appearance. During the 2015–16 NBA season, Daigneault joined Billy Donovan's coaching staff, who was hired as the Thunder's head coach, midseason after assistant Maurice Cheeks was sidelined for six weeks. Daigneault remained with the Thunder for the remainder of the season and later rejoined the Blue after the Thunder's playoff run. In the 2016–17 season, Daigneault led the Blue to a franchise-record 34 wins. The Blue finished first in the Western Conference but lost in the conference finals. After a conference finals appearance, the Blue failed to advance out of the first round after ranking third in the Western Conference in the 2017–18 season. In his final season, Daigneault led the Blue to its third consecutive division championship and matched the franchise-record again with 34 wins. However, the Blue lost in the conference semifinals which marked their last playoff appearance.

With his fifth and final season, Daigneault became the longest tenured coach in franchise history. In his tenure, Daigneault won three NBA G League Coach of the Month awards, led the Blue to four playoff appearances and a 143–107 record, the most wins by a coach in franchise history. Daigneault also saw eight players called up to NBA rosters and four players signed to two-way contracts, including Alex Caruso, Markel Brown, Semaj Christon, Daniel Hamilton, Josh Huestis and Dakari Johnson.

=== Oklahoma City Thunder (2019–present) ===
After a brief stint in the 2015–16 NBA season, Daigneault was named as an assistant coach with the Oklahoma City Thunder, reuniting again with head coach Billy Donovan. With this move, Daigneault became the fourth-straight head coach of the Oklahoma City Blue to become an assistant in the NBA.

After the 2019–20 season, the Thunder and head coach Billy Donovan mutually agreed to part ways as the team transitioned into a rebuilding phase. On November 11, 2020, the Thunder named Daigneault as the team's new head coach, becoming the fourth head coach in Thunder history. With the hire, Daigneault became the second youngest head coach at the time in the NBA.

The opportunity to be the head coach of the Thunder is truly a special honor," said Daigneault. "Over my six years in Oklahoma City I've developed a deep commitment to the organization and a care for what is truly a special community that I call home. From my first day here, my values have always been aligned with those of the organization, and I'm looking forward to helping them continue to be lived out on and off the court. I want to thank Mr. Bennett, Sam and the entire organization for the opportunity, and I'm grateful to all the coaches, staff and especially players who have helped me throughout my career."

— Mark Daigneault

During the Thunder's coaching search, general manager Sam Presti was enthusiastic regarding Daigneault's track record in the Thunder organization, including "connecting with players, teaching the game and making the kind of short- and longer-term adjustments that are crucial for a franchise that is transitioning out of playoff contention and toward a younger, developmental roster."

With the Thunder in a rebuilding phase, Daigneault finished his first season with a 22–50 record, the first losing season since the 2008–09 season. In his second season, Daigneault led the youngest team in NBA history to eight 15-plus-point comeback wins. Prior to All-Star break, the Thunder also had the eighth-best-ranked defensive rating at 108.6. However, the Thunder finished with a 24–58 record, tallying their second consecutive losing season since the franchise moved to Oklahoma City. In the third season of the Thunder's rebuild, Daigneault emerged as one of the best coaches in the NBA as the Thunder improved to a 40–42 record, a 16-win improvement from the previous season. The Thunder made the NBA play-in tournament as the tenth seed and defeated the New Orleans Pelicans before losing to the Minnesota Timberwolves, falling one game shy of the 2023 NBA playoffs. After exceeding preseason expectations and a play-in appearance, Daigneault was nominated for the NBA Coach of the Year Award. Daigneault ultimately finished second in voting with 48 second-place votes and 20 third-place votes. Prior to the start of the 2023–24 season, the Thunder announced that head coach Daigneault signed a multi-year contract extension.

In April 2024, Daigneault was named NBA Coach of the Year for the 2023–24 season. He joins Scott Brooks (2010) as the only Thunder coaches to win the award. Daigneault would go on to win the 2025 NBA Finals, his first NBA championship, in seven games over the Indiana Pacers.

== Coaching style ==
Daigneault has been described as "open-minded, innovative, and unconventional" during his stint with the Thunder. During the Thunder's rebuild, Daigneault led the Thunder to multiple seasons ranking top-10 in defense. In the 2022–23 season, the Thunder were one of the best third quarter teams coming out of halftime due to Daigneault's in-game adjustments.

After the 2022–23 season, many Thunder players credited Daigneault's coaching and their relationship with him during the Thunder's annual exit interviews. Second-year guard Josh Giddey said Daigneault was the ideal coach, quoting "If I could build a coach, it's Mark [Daigneault]" while also calling him a smart coach. Dario Šarić, who was acquired at the trade deadline, said "[Daigneault] is the right coach for these young players" and that "some coaches get where they stick to it, [Daigneault] is open minded."

== Head coaching record ==
Legend
| Regular season | G | Games coached | W | Games won | L | Games lost | W–L % | Win–loss % |
| Playoffs | PG | Playoff games | PW | Playoff wins | PL | Playoff losses | PW–L % | Playoff win–loss % |

=== NBA ===
| Team | Year | G | W | L | W–L% | Finish | PG | PW | PL | PW–L% | Result |
|---|---|---|---|---|---|---|---|---|---|---|---|
| Oklahoma City | 2020–21 | 72 | 22 | 50 | .306 | 5th in Northwest | — | — | — | — | Missed playoffs |
| Oklahoma City | 2021–22 | 82 | 24 | 58 | .293 | 5th in Northwest | — | — | — | — | Missed playoffs |
| Oklahoma City | 2022–23 | 82 | 40 | 42 | .488 | 3rd in Northwest | — | — | — | — | Missed playoffs |
| Oklahoma City | 2023–24 | 82 | 57 | 25 | .695 | 1st in Northwest | 10 | 6 | 4 | .600 | Lost in conference semifinals |
| Oklahoma City | 2024–25 | 82 | 68 | 14 | .829 | 1st in Northwest | 23 | 16 | 7 | .696 | Won NBA Championship |
| Oklahoma City | 2025–26 | 82 | 64 | 18 | .780 | 1st in Northwest | 15 | 11 | 4 | .733 | Lost in conference finals |
| Career | | 482 | 275 | 207 | .571 | | 48 | 33 | 15 | .688 | |

=== NBA G League ===
| Team | Year | G | W | L | W–L% | Finish | PG | PW | PL | PW–L% | Result |
|---|---|---|---|---|---|---|---|---|---|---|---|
| Oklahoma City | 2014–15 | 50 | 28 | 22 | .560 | 4th in West | 2 | 0 | 2 | .000 | Lost in First Round |
| Oklahoma City | 2015–16 | 50 | 19 | 31 | .380 | 8th in West | — | — | — | — | Missed playoffs |
| Oklahoma City | 2016–17 | 50 | 34 | 16 | .680 | 1st in West | 6 | 3 | 3 | .500 | Lost in Conference Finals |
| Oklahoma City | 2017–18 | 50 | 28 | 22 | .560 | 3rd in West | 1 | 0 | 1 | .000 | Lost in First Round |
| Oklahoma City | 2018–19 | 50 | 34 | 16 | .680 | 3rd in West | 2 | 1 | 1 | .500 | Lost in Conference Semifinal |
| Career | | 250 | 143 | 107 | .572 | | 11 | 4 | 7 | .364 | |

== Personal life ==
Daigneault's father, Rick, is a 1980 graduate of the College of the Holy Cross, and was a member of the Crusader baseball team. Daigneault's wife, Ashley Kerr, whom he married in 2019, is a women's gymnastics assistant coach at the University of Oklahoma. They have since had two children together, born in 2021 and 2023.

As a child, Daigneault attended former NBA assistant coach Mark Osowski's youth basketball camp and later helped run the camp following Osowski's death. Daigneault credits Osowski's influence and experience working with him to the possibility of becoming an NBA coach. Daigneault was also steered into enrolling at the University of Connecticut by his former high school basketball coach Steve Dubzinski. Dubzinski helped Daigneault receive his first experience in college basketball as a student manager for the Huskies.
