= 2021–22 Oklahoma City Thunder season =

- Head coach: Mark Daigneault
- General manager: Sam Presti
- Owners: Professional Basketball Club LLC; Clay Bennett (Chairman)
- Arena: Paycom Center

Results
- Record: 24–58 (.293)
- Place: Division: 5th (Northwest); Conference: 14th (Western)
- Playoff finish: Did not qualify
- Stats at Basketball Reference

Local media
- Television: Bally Sports Oklahoma
- Radio: KWPN and WWLS-FM

The 2021–22 Oklahoma City Thunder season was the 14th season of the franchise in Oklahoma City and the 56th in the National Basketball Association (NBA).

The Thunder were officially eliminated from playoff contention for the second consecutive season. It was the first time the team suffered consecutive losing seasons since 2006–2009 where they went on a four–year stretch.

== Previous season ==
The Thunder finished the 2020–21 season 22–50 to finish in fourth place in the Northwest Division, fourteenth in the Western Conference and failed to qualify for the playoffs for the first time since 2014-15.

In their first year of the rebuild, the Thunder started the season returning only six players from the 2019-20 season. The Thunder also mutually agreed to part ways with head coach Billy Donovan after five seasons. To replace Donovan, the Thunder promoted assistant coach Mark Daigneault who previously served as the head coach of the Oklahoma City Blue.

Replacing Chris Paul, Danilo Gallinari, and Steven Adams in the starting lineup, the Thunder started veterans George Hill, Al Horford and promoted second-year forward Darius Bazley. After failing to trade Horford at the deadline, the Thunder announced Horford will remain inactive for the rest of the season to prioritize the team's younger talent. After Shai Gilgeous-Alexander's season-ending injury and Al Horford being shut down, the Thunder finished April and May with a 2–23 record including a 152–95 loss to the Indiana Pacers which was the largest home loss in league history.

== Offseason ==
=== Draft picks ===
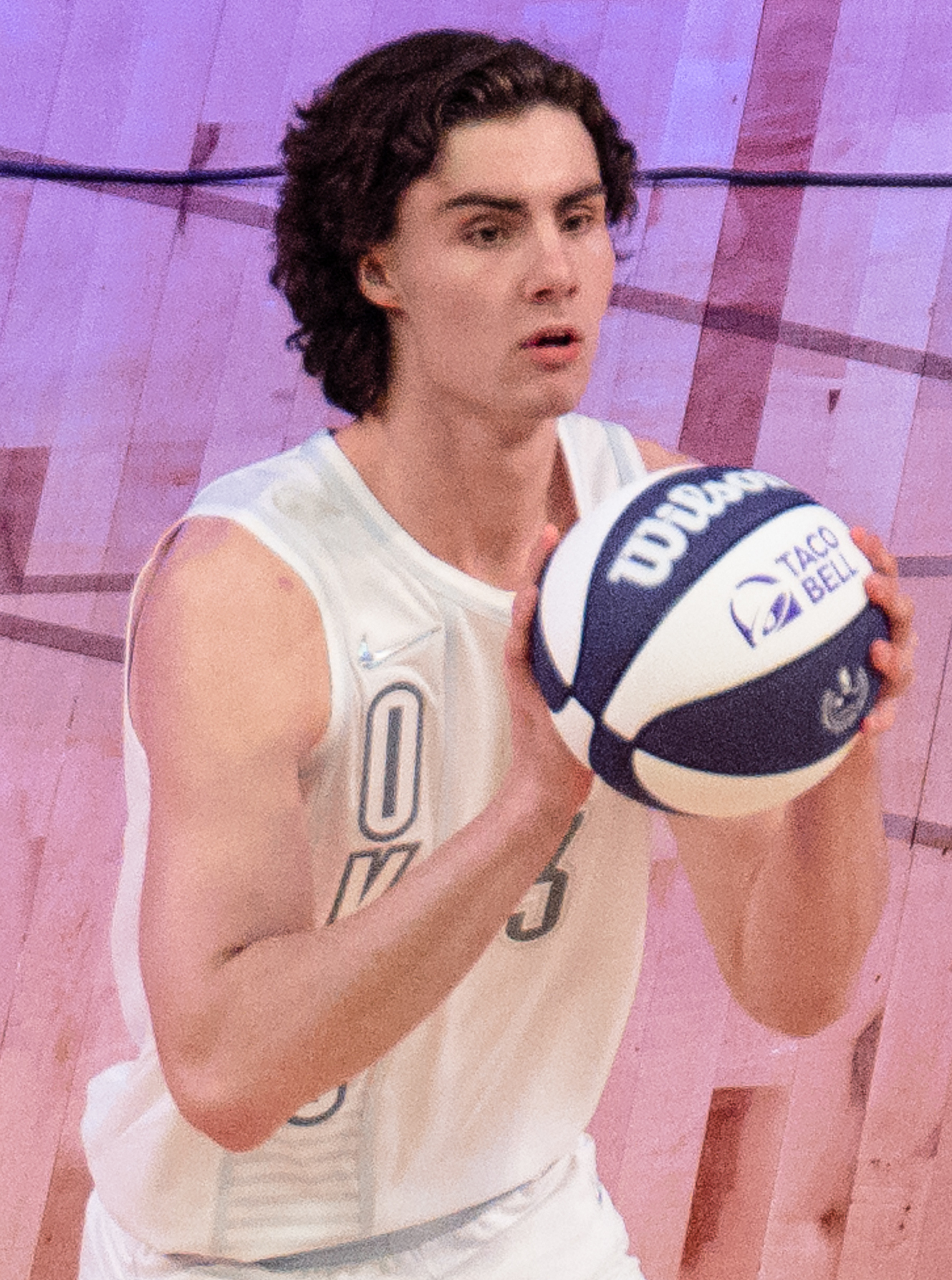
Josh Giddey was selected 6th overall by the Oklahoma City Thunder.

Round	Pick	Player	Position	Nationality	College/club team
1	6	Josh Giddey	PG	Australia	Adelaide 36ers
1	16	Alperen Şengün	C	Turkey	Beşiktaş
1	18	Tre Mann	PG	United States	Florida
2	34	Rokas Jokubaitis	PG	Lithuania	FC Barcelona
2	36	Miles McBride	PG	United States	West Virginia
2	55	Aaron Wiggins	SG	United States	Maryland
Jeremiah Robinson-Earl was later traded to the Thunder via New York Knicks

The Thunder had three first round-picks and three second-round picks entering the draft. The Thunder owned one first-round pick entering the 2021 NBA draft lottery. The Thunder ended the night with the sixth overall pick after having a 34.1% chance to be in the top three. The Thunder other's first rounders were acquired from the Al Horford trade and the Paul George trade. The Thunder also acquired two other second-round picks from the Kelly Oubre Jr. trade.

On draft night, the Thunder traded the draft rights to Alperen Şengün, the 16th pick, to the Houston Rockets in exchange for a 2022 protected first-round pick via DET and a 2023 protected first-round pick via WAS. The Thunder traded the draft rights to Rokas Jokubaitis, the 34th pick, and the draft rights to Miles McBride, the 36th pick to the New York Knicks in exchange for the draft rights to Jeremiah Robinson-Earl, the 32nd pick.

The Thunder ended 2021 NBA draft night with Australia's NBL guard Josh Giddey, Florida guard Tre Mann, Villanova center Jeremiah Robinson-Earl and Maryland guard Aaron Wiggins.

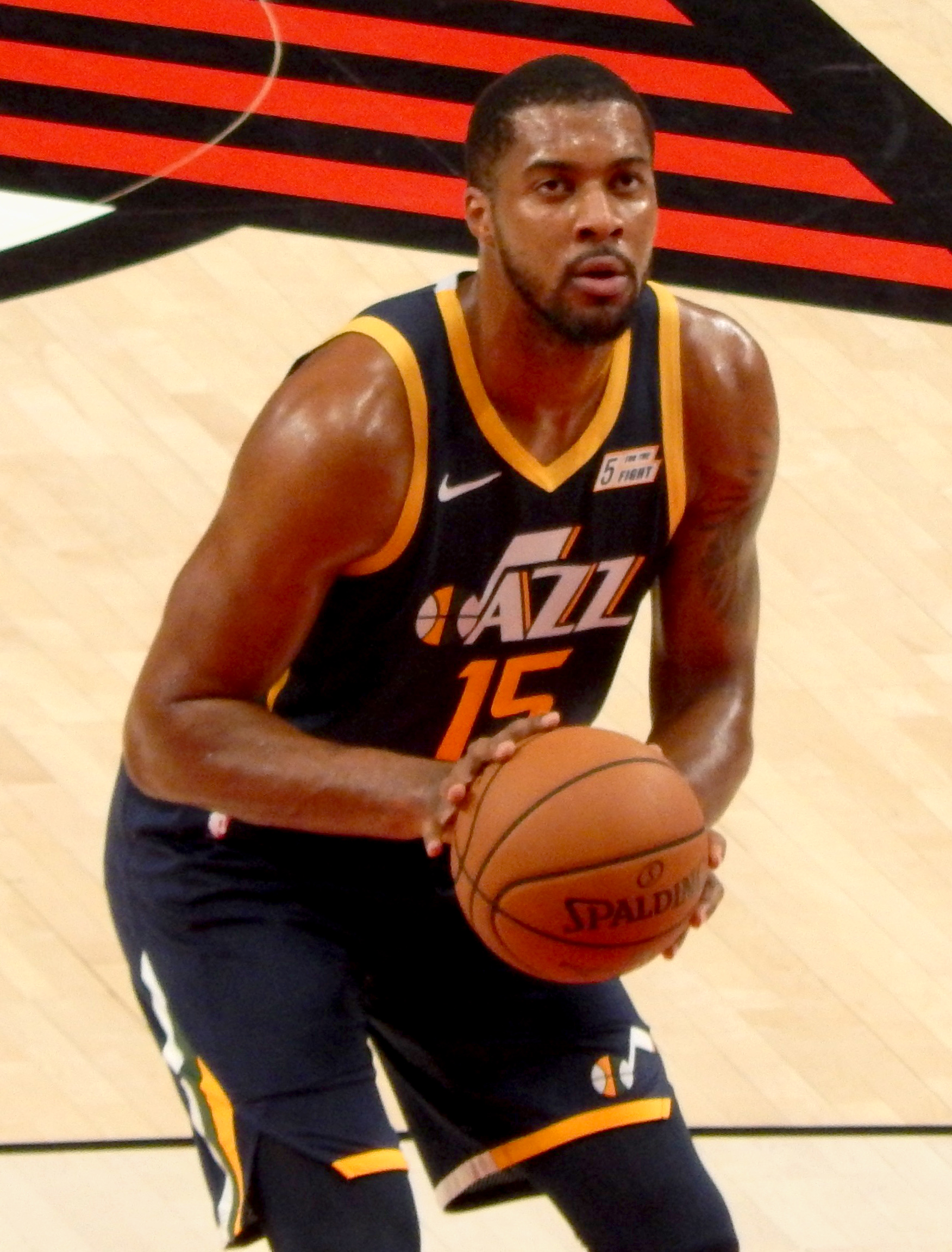
Derrick Favors was traded to the Thunder.

=== Trades ===
On June 18, the Thunder traded Al Horford, Moses Brown and a 2023 second-round pick to the Boston Celtics in exchange for Kemba Walker, a 2021 first-round pick and a 2025 second-round pick. On August 6, the Thunder negotiated a contract buyout and waived Walker. In return, Walker gave up $20 million in total in his buyout. Walker gave up $9.7 million in his 2021-22 salary and $10.2 million in his 2022-23 salary.

On July 30, the Thunder traded a 2027 second-round pick and cash considerations to the Utah Jazz in exchange for Derrick Favors and a future first-round pick.

=== Free agency ===
For this offseason, free agency began on August 2, 2021. Tony Bradley, Svi Mykhailiuk and Mike Muscala were set to hit unrestricted free agency while Josh Hall was set to hit restricted free agency. On August 2, it was reported that Mike Muscala agreed to a two-year, $7 million deal to stay with the Thunder, which he later signed on August 11. On August 18, Josh Hall accepted his two-way qualifying offer to re-sign with the Thunder. However, on September 12, the Thunder waived Hall. On August 19, Tony Bradley signed a deal with the Chicago Bulls. On September 11, Svi Mykhailiuk signed a deal with the Toronto Raptors. On August 2, it was reported that Shai Gilgeous-Alexander agreed to a five-year, $172 million rookie extension with the Thunder, which he later signed on August 6.

On September 3, Vít Krejčí signed a rookie deal with the Thunder. Krejčí was originally selected 37th overall in the 2020 NBA draft but did not sign a contract in the 2020-21 season, instead spent the season rehabbing with the Oklahoma City Blue after tearing his ACL. On September 15, Paul Watson Jr. signed a two-way contract with the Thunder. Watson Jr. spent the 2020-21 season with the Toronto Raptors.

On September 26, Charlie Brown Jr. was waived by the Thunder.

=== Front office and coaching changes ===
On August 10, the Thunder announced Nick Collison as a special assistant to Sam Presti. Prior to taking this position, Collison served as a basketball operations representative for the Thunder. Collison joins Eric Maynor, Nazr Mohammed, Mike Milks and Anthony Morrow as former Thunder players contributing to the Thunder organization.

== Roster ==
2021–22 Oklahoma City Thunder roster
Players

Pos.	No.	Player	Height	Weight	DOB	From
G/F	7	Darius Bazley (injured)	6 ft 8 in (2.03 m)	208 lb (94 kg)	2000-06-12	Princeton HS (OH)
G	5	Luguentz Dort (injured)	6 ft 3 in (1.91 m)	215 lb (98 kg)	1999-04-19	Arizona State
F	15	Derrick Favors (injured)	6 ft 9 in (2.06 m)	265 lb (120 kg)	1991-07-15	Georgia Tech
G/F	6	Melvin Frazier Jr. (TW)	6 ft 5 in (1.96 m)	215 lb (98 kg)	1996-08-30	Tulane
G	3	Josh Giddey (injured)	6 ft 8 in (2.03 m)	205 lb (93 kg)	2002-10-10	Australia
G	2	Shai Gilgeous-Alexander (injured)	6 ft 6 in (1.98 m)	180 lb (82 kg)	1998-07-12	Kentucky
G/F	16	Ty Jerome (injured)	6 ft 5 in (1.96 m)	195 lb (88 kg)	1997-07-08	Virginia
G	27	Vít Krejčí	6 ft 8 in (2.03 m)	195 lb (88 kg)	2000-06-19	Czech Republic
G	11	Théo Maledon	6 ft 4 in (1.93 m)	175 lb (79 kg)	2001-06-12	France
G	23	Tre Mann (injured)	6 ft 5 in (1.96 m)	190 lb (86 kg)	2001-02-03	Florida
F/C	33	Mike Muscala (injured)	6 ft 10 in (2.08 m)	240 lb (109 kg)	1991-07-01	Bucknell
F	17	Aleksej Pokuševski	7 ft 0 in (2.13 m)	190 lb (86 kg)	2001-12-26	Serbia
F	50	Jeremiah Robinson-Earl	6 ft 9 in (2.06 m)	230 lb (104 kg)	2000-11-03	Villanova
F	22	Isaiah Roby	6 ft 8 in (2.03 m)	230 lb (104 kg)	1998-02-03	Nebraska
G	12	Lindy Waters (TW)	6 ft 6 in (1.98 m)	215 lb (98 kg)	1997-07-28	Oklahoma State
G	21	Aaron Wiggins	6 ft 6 in (1.98 m)	200 lb (91 kg)	1999-01-02	Maryland
G/F	34	Kenrich Williams (injured)	6 ft 6 in (1.98 m)	210 lb (95 kg)	1994-12-02	TCU

Coaches
Head coach
- Mark Daigneault
Assistant(s)
- David Akinyooye
- Dave Bliss
- Mike Wilks
- Kameron Woods

Legend
- (DP) Unsigned draft pick
- (FA) Free agent
- (S) Suspended
- (GL) On assignment to G League affiliate
- (TW) Two-way affiliate player
- Injured

Roster
Updated: April 11, 2022

== Staff ==
Oklahoma City Thunder staff
Front Office: Chairman – Clay Bennett; Executive Vice President & General Manager – Sam Presti; Vice President of Basketball Operations – Rob Hennigan; Vice President of Basketball Operations – Will Dawkins; Basketball Operations: Chief of Staff – Glenn Wong; Vice President of Human & Player Performance – Donnie Strack; Vice President of Logistics & Engagement – Marc St. Yves; Vice President of Basketball Communications & Engagement – Matt Tumbleson; Vice President / Team Counsel & Strategic Alignment – Amanda Green; Vice President of Strategy & Analysis – Jesse Gould; Vice President of Strategy & Design – Wynn Sullivan; Pro Evaluation Scout – Nazr Mohammed	Coaches: Head coach – Mark Daigneault; Assistant coach – David Akinyooye; Assistant coach – Dave Bliss; Assistant coach – Mike Wilks; Assistant coach – Kameron Woods; Assistant coach for Player Development – Zach Peterson; Assistant coach for Player Development – Eric Maynor; Assistant coach for Program Development – Connor Johnson; Broadcasters: Play-by-Play – Chris Fisher; Television Analyst – Michael Cage; Broadcast Reporter – Nick Gallo; Broadcast Reporter – Paris Lawson; Radio Broadcaster – Matt Pinto; Spanish Radio Broadcaster – Eleno Ornelas; → Coaching staff → Management → Ownership → Broadcasters

== Standings ==
=== Division ===
Northwest Division	W	L	PCT	GB	Home	Road	Div	GP
y – Utah Jazz	49	33	.598	–	29‍–‍12	20‍–‍21	15–1	82
x – Denver Nuggets	48	34	.585	1.0	23‍–‍18	25‍–‍16	6–10	82
x – Minnesota Timberwolves	46	36	.561	3.0	26‍–‍15	20‍–‍21	12–4	82
Portland Trail Blazers	27	55	.329	22.0	17‍–‍24	10‍–‍31	1–15	82
Oklahoma City Thunder	24	58	.293	25.0	12‍–‍29	12‍–‍29	6–10	82

=== Conference ===
Western Conference
#	Team	W	L	PCT	GB	GP
1	z – Phoenix Suns *	64	18	.780	–	82
2	y – Memphis Grizzlies *	56	26	.683	8.0	82
3	x – Golden State Warriors	53	29	.646	11.0	82
4	x – Dallas Mavericks	52	30	.634	12.0	82
5	y – Utah Jazz *	49	33	.598	15.0	82
6	x – Denver Nuggets	48	34	.585	16.0	82
7	x – Minnesota Timberwolves	46	36	.561	18.0	82
8	pi – Los Angeles Clippers	42	40	.512	22.0	82
9	x – New Orleans Pelicans	36	46	.439	28.0	82
10	pi − San Antonio Spurs	34	48	.415	30.0	82
11	Los Angeles Lakers	33	49	.402	31.0	82
12	Sacramento Kings	30	52	.366	34.0	82
13	Portland Trail Blazers	27	55	.329	37.0	82
14	Oklahoma City Thunder	24	58	.293	40.0	82
15	Houston Rockets	20	62	.244	44.0	82

== Game log ==
=== Preseason ===
2021 preseason game log
Total: 1–3 (Home: 1–2; Road: 0–1)
Preseason: 1–3 (home: 1–2; road: 0–1)

Game	Date	Team	Score	High points	High rebounds	High assists	Location Attendance	Record
1	October 4	Charlotte	L 93–117	Josh Giddey (18)	Josh Giddey (7)	Gilgeous-Alexander & Maledon (4)	Paycom Center	0–1
2	October 10	@ Milwaukee	L 110–130	Luguentz Dort (19)	D. J. Wilson (7)	Giddey, Gilgeous-Alexander (6)	Fiserv Forum; 12,442	0–2
3	October 13	Denver	W 108–99	Darius Bazley (16)	Darius Bazley (8)	Shai Gilgeous-Alexander (4)	Paycom Center	1–2
4	October 14	Denver	L 107–113	Aleksej Pokuševski (22)	Gabriel Deck (11)	Josh Giddey (8)	BOK Center	1–3

2021–22 season schedule

=== Regular season ===
2021–22 game log
Total: 24–58 (Home: 12–29; Road: 12–29)
October: 1–5 (home: 1–2; road: 0–3)

Game	Date	Team	Score	High points	High rebounds	High assists	Location Attendance	Record
1	October 20	@ Utah	L 86–107	Shai Gilgeous-Alexander (18)	Josh Giddey (10)	Giddey, Pokuševski, Maledon (3)	Vivint Arena; 18,306	0–1
2	October 22	@ Houston	L 91–124	Shai Gilgeous-Alexander (13)	Aleksej Pokuševski (7)	Dort, Giddey (4)	Toyota Center; 15,674	0–2
3	October 24	Philadelphia	L 103–115	Shai Gilgeous-Alexander (29)	Josh Giddey (8)	Shai Gilgeous-Alexander (8)	Paycom Center; 14,256	0–3
4	October 26	Golden State	L 98–106	Shai Gilgeous-Alexander (30)	Josh Giddey (9)	Giddey, Gilgeous-Alexander (4)	Paycom Center; 15,717	0–4
5	October 27	LA Lakers	W 123–115	Shai Gilgeous-Alexander (27)	Shai Gilgeous-Alexander (9)	Josh Giddey (10)	Paycom Center; 15,783	1–4
6	October 30	@ Golden State	L 82–103	Shai Gilgeous-Alexander (15)	Darius Bazley (8)	Josh Giddey (6)	Chase Center; 18,063	1–5

November: 5–9 (home: 3–4; road: 2–5)

Game	Date	Team	Score	High points	High rebounds	High assists	Location Attendance	Record
7	November 1	@ LA Clippers	L 95–99	Shai Gilgeous-Alexander (28)	Maledon, Muscala, Gilgeous-Alexander (7)	Josh Giddey (7)	Staples Center; 13,722	1–6
8	November 4	@ LA Lakers	W 107–104	Shai Gilgeous-Alexander (28)	Derrick Favors (11)	Josh Giddey (8)	Staples Center; 18,997	2–6
9	November 7	San Antonio	W 99–94	Mike Muscala (20)	Darius Bazley (11)	Shai Gilgeous-Alexander (9)	Paycom Center; 12,972	3–6
10	November 10	@ New Orleans	W 108–100	Luguentz Dort (27)	Josh Giddey (12)	Josh Giddey (9)	Smoothie King Center; 15,355	4–6
11	November 12	Sacramento	W 105–103	Dort, Gilgeous-Alexander (22)	Jeremiah Robinson-Earl (14)	Josh Giddey (5)	Paycom Center; 12,881	5–6
12	November 14	Brooklyn	L 96–120	Shai Gilgeous-Alexander (23)	Jeremiah Robinson-Earl (8)	Giddey, Wiggins (4)	Paycom Center; 15,080	5–7
13	November 15	Miami	L 90–103	Luguentz Dort (20)	Darius Bazley (7)	Shai Gilgeous-Alexander (5)	Paycom Center; 12,330	5–8
14	November 17	Houston	W 101–89	Luguentz Dort (34)	Josh Giddey (11)	Shai Gilgeous-Alexander (9)	Paycom Center; 12,066	6–8
15	November 19	@ Milwaukee	L 89–96	Shai Gilgeous-Alexander (17)	Josh Giddey (12)	Giddey, Williams (4)	Fiserv Forum; 17,341	6–9
16	November 20	@ Boston	L 105–111	Luguentz Dort (16)	Darius Bazley (10)	Darius Bazley (6)	TD Garden; 19,156	6–10
17	November 22	@ Atlanta	L 101–113	Dort, Giddey, Jerome (15)	Jeremiah Robinson-Earl (10)	Josh Giddey (8)	State Farm Arena; 15,806	6–11
18	November 24	Utah	L 104–110	Luguentz Dort (27)	Jeremiah Robinson-Earl (10)	Josh Giddey (8)	Paycom Center; 17,341	6–12
19	November 26	Washington	L 99–101	Luguentz Dort (21)	Shai Gilgeous-Alexander (8)	Shai Gilgeous-Alexander (9)	Paycom Center; 14,579	6–13
20	November 29	@ Houston	L 89–102	Shai Gilgeous-Alexander (22)	Mann, Robinson-Earl (7)	Josh Giddey (7)	Toyota Center; 12,829	6–14

December: 7–8 (home: 4–4; road: 3–4)

Game	Date	Team	Score	High points	High rebounds	High assists	Location Attendance	Record
21	December 1	Houston	L 110–114	Shai Gilgeous-Alexander (39)	Jeremiah Robinson-Earl (9)	Dort, Robinson-Earl (4)	Paycom Center; 13,222	6–15
22	December 2	@ Memphis	L 79–152 (Note: Record for largest margin of victory in NBA history, by 73 points.)	Luguentz Dort (15)	Muscala, Robinson-Earl (5)	Ty Jerome (4)	FedExForum; 13,103	6–16
23	December 6	@ Detroit	W 114–103	Shai Gilgeous-Alexander (30)	Bazley, Robinson-Earl (8)	Shai Gilgeous-Alexander (13)	Little Caesars Arena; 10,522	7–16
24	December 8	@ Toronto	W 110–109	Shai Gilgeous-Alexander (26)	Derrick Favors (9)	Shai Gilgeous-Alexander (9)	Scotiabank Arena; 19,800	8–16
25	December 10	LA Lakers	L 95–116	Tre Mann (19)	Jeremiah Robinson-Earl (9)	Josh Giddey (7)	Paycom Center; 16,523	8–17
26	December 12	Dallas	L 84–103	Shai Gilgeous-Alexander (18)	Aleksej Pokuševski (9)	Shai Gilgeous-Alexander (5)	Paycom Center; 15,747	8–18
27	December 15	New Orleans	L 110–113	Shai Gilgeous-Alexander (33)	Josh Giddey (9)	Josh Giddey (7)	Paycom Center; 13,253	8–19
28	December 18	LA Clippers	W 104–103	Luguentz Dort (29)	Josh Giddey (10)	Josh Giddey (18)	Paycom Center; 15,123	9–19
29	December 20	@ Memphis	W 102–99	Shai Gilgeous-Alexander (23)	Shai Gilgeous-Alexander (7)	Josh Giddey (11)	FedEx Forum; 15,721	10–19
30	December 22	Denver	W 108–94	Shai Gilgeous-Alexander (27)	Bazley, Gilgeous-Alexander (11)	Shai Gilgeous-Alexander (12)	Paycom Center; 14,932	11–19
31	December 23	@ Phoenix	L 101–113	Shai Gilgeous-Alexander (29)	Darius Bazley (10)	Shai Gilgeous-Alexander (7)	Footprint Center; 17,071	11–20
32	December 26	New Orleans	W 117–112	Shai Gilgeous-Alexander (31)	Josh Giddey (10)	Josh Giddey (10)	Paycom Center; 15,608	12–20
33	December 28	@ Sacramento	L 111–117	Shai Gilgeous-Alexander (33)	Dort, Williams (8)	Shai Gilgeous-Alexander (5)	Golden 1 Center; 14,750	12–21
34	December 29	@ Phoenix	L 97–115	Ty Jerome (24)	Jerome, Wiggins (8)	Ty Jerome (5)	Footprint Center; 17,071	12–22
35	December 31	New York	W 95–80	Shai Gilgeous-Alexander (23)	Isaiah Roby (9)	Ty Jerome (5)	Paycom Center; 16,451	13–22

January: 2–12 (home: 1–5; road: 1–7)

Game	Date	Team	Score	High points	High rebounds	High assists	Location Attendance	Record
36	January 2	Dallas	L 86–95	Josh Giddey (17)	Josh Giddey (13)	Josh Giddey (14)	Paycom Center; 14,571	13–23
37	January 5	@ Minnesota	L 90–98	Shai Gilgeous-Alexander (19)	Shai Gilgeous-Alexander (15)	Shai Gilgeous-Alexander (6)	Target Center; 14,375	13–24
38	January 7	Minnesota	L 105–135	Luguentz Dort (18)	Jeremiah Robinson-Earl (8)	Shai Gilgeous-Alexander (6)	Paycom Center; 14,874	13–25
39	January 9	Denver	L 95–99	Luguentz Dort (14)	Josh Giddey (7)	Josh Giddey (8)	Paycom Center; 14,772	13–26
40	January 11	@ Washington	L 118–122	Shai Gilgeous-Alexander (32)	Darius Bazley (9)	Giddey, Gilgeous-Alexander (8)	Capital One Arena; 13,985	13–27
41	January 13	@ Brooklyn	W 130–109	Shai Gilgeous-Alexander (33)	Shai Gilgeous-Alexander (10)	Shai Gilgeous-Alexander (9)	Barclays Center; 16,964	14–27
42	January 15	Cleveland	L 102–107	Shai Gilgeous-Alexander (21)	Jeremiah Robinson-Earl (11)	Shai Gilgeous-Alexander (7)	Paycom Center; 15,284	14–28
43	January 17	@ Dallas	L 102–104	Shai Gilgeous-Alexander (34)	Luguentz Dort (7)	Dort, Giddey (7)	American Airlines Center; 19,266	14–29
44	January 19	@ San Antonio	L 96–118	Aaron Wiggins (19)	Josh Giddey (11)	Josh Giddey (8)	AT&T Center; 11,848	14–30
45	January 21	@ Charlotte	L 98–121	Shai Gilgeous-Alexander (29)	Jeremiah Robinson-Earl (11)	Shai Gilgeous-Alexander (6)	Paycom Center; 15,835	14–31
46	January 22	@ Cleveland	L 87–94	Shai Gilgeous-Alexander (29)	Shai Gilgeous-Alexander (9)	Shai Gilgeous-Alexander (6)	Rocket Mortgage FieldHouse; 19,432	14–32
47	January 24	Chicago	L 110–111	Shai Gilgeous-Alexander (31)	Bazley, Giddey (8)	Shai Gilgeous-Alexander (10)	Paycom Center; 14,378	14–33
48	January 28	Indiana	L 110–113 (OT)	Luguentz Dort (27)	Josh Giddey (10)	Josh Giddey (5)	Paycom Center; 15,106	14–34
49	January 31	Portland	W 98–81	Luguentz Dort (18)	Josh Giddey (12)	Ty Jerome (6)	Paycom Center; 13,812	15–34

February : 4–7 (home: 0–4; road: 4–3)

Game	Date	Team	Score	High points	High rebounds	High assists	Location Attendance	Record
50	February 2	@ Dallas	W 120–114 (OT)	Luguentz Dort (30)	Darius Bazley (11)	Josh Giddey (10)	American Airlines Center; 19,200	16–34
51	February 4	@ Portland	W 96–93	Luguentz Dort (23)	Darius Bazley (12)	Ty Jerome (8)	Moda Center; 15,329	17–34
52	February 5	@ Sacramento	L 103–113	Josh Giddey (24)	Aleksej Pokuševski (9)	Josh Giddey (8)	Golden 1 Center; 14,097	17–35
53	February 7	Golden State	L 98–110	Luguentz Dort (26)	Josh Giddey (11)	Josh Giddey (7)	Paycom Center; 17,009	17–36
54	February 9	Toronto	L 98–117	Pokuševski, Maledon (18)	Kenrich Williams (12)	Giddey, Williams (6)	Paycom Center; 13,858	17–37
55	February 11	@ Philadelphia	L 87–100	Derrick Favors (16)	Darius Bazley (15)	Giddey, Jerome (5)	Wells Fargo Center; 20,669	17–38
56	February 12	@ Chicago	L 101–106	Luguentz Dort (31)	Josh Giddey (12)	Josh Giddey (10)	United Center; 20,072	17–39
57	February 14	@ New York	W 127–123	Tre Mann (30)	Josh Giddey (11)	Josh Giddey (12)	Madison Square Garden; 18,433	18–39
58	February 16	San Antonio	L 106–114	Tre Mann (24)	Isaiah Roby (12)	Josh Giddey (10)	Paycom Center; 14,920	18–40
All-Star Break
59	February 24	Phoenix	L 104–124	Shai Gilgeous-Alexander (32)	Josh Giddey (9)	Giddey, Mann (6)	Paycom Center; 14,176	18–41
60	February 25	@ Indiana	W 129–125 (OT)	Shai Gilgeous-Alexander (36)	Isaiah Roby (11)	Gilgeous-Alexander, Mann (5)	Gainbridge Fieldhouse; 15,182	19–41
61	February 28	Sacramento	L 110–131	Shai Gilgeous-Alexander (37)	Aleksej Pokuševski (8)	Shai Gilgeous-Alexander (10)	Paycom Center; 13,945	19–42

March : 3–12 (home: 1–7; road: 2–5)

Game	Date	Team	Score	High points	High rebounds	High assists	Location Attendance	Record
62	March 2	@ Denver	W 119–107	Shai Gilgeous-Alexander (29)	Aleksej Pokuševski (11)	Gilgeous-Alexander, Roby (5)	Ball Arena; 15,167	20–42
63	March 4	Minnesota	L 101–138	Shai Gilgeous-Alexander (33)	Isaiah Roby (10)	Shai Gilgeous-Alexander (7)	Paycom Center; 15,180	20–43
64	March 6	Utah	L 103–116	Shai Gilgeous-Alexander (33)	Aleksej Pokuševski (11)	Shai Gilgeous-Alexander (8)	Paycom Center; 15,079	20–44
65	March 8	Milwaukee	L 115–142	Shai Gilgeous-Alexander (33)	Shai Gilgeous-Alexander (8)	Shai Gilgeous-Alexander (14)	Paycom Center; 15,743	20–45
66	March 9	@ Minnesota	L 102–132	Aaron Wiggins (25)	Aaron Wiggins (9)	Shai Gilgeous-Alexander (8)	Target Center; 16,191	20–46
67	March 13	Memphis	L 118–125	Shai Gilgeous-Alexander (31)	Darius Bazley (10)	Shai Gilgeous-Alexander (7)	Paycom Center; 17,482	20–47
68	March 14	Charlotte	W 134–116	Shai Gilgeous-Alexander (32)	Shai Gilgeous-Alexander (8)	Tre Mann (6)	Paycom Center; 15,810	20–48
69	March 16	@ San Antonio	L 120–122	Shai Gilgeous-Alexander (34)	Darius Bazley (9)	Gilgeous-Alexander, Maledon (9)	AT&T Center; 14,994	20–49
70	March 18	@ Miami	L 108–120	Shai Gilgeous-Alexander (26)	Aleksej Pokuševski (15)	Aleksej Pokuševski (5)	FTX Arena; 19,600	20–50
71	March 20	@ Orlando	L 85–90	Darius Bazley (18)	Isaiah Roby (10)	Aleksej Pokuševski (5)	Amway Center; 15,012	20–51
72	March 21	Boston	L 123–132	Tre Mann (35)	Darius Bazley (10)	Shai Gilgeous-Alexander (9)	Paycom Center; 15,345	20–52
73	March 23	Orlando	W 118–102	Théo Maledon (25)	Vít Krejčí (11)	Théo Maledon (6)	Paycom Center; 14,393	21–52
74	March 26	@ Denver	L 106–113	Théo Maledon (20)	Isaiah Roby (7)	Vít Krejčí (6)	Ball Arena; 19,520	21–53
75	March 28	@ Portland	W 134–131 (OT)	Isaiah Roby (30)	Théo Maledon (10)	Aleksej Pokuševski (11)	Moda Center; 18,188	22–53
76	March 30	Atlanta	L 118–136	Lindy Waters III (25)	Roby, Sarr (9)	Théo Maledon (8)	Paycom Center; 15,595	22–54

April : 2–4 (home: 2–1; road: 0–3)

Game	Date	Team	Score	High points	High rebounds	High assists	Location Attendance	Record
77	April 1	Detroit	L 101–110	Théo Maledon (28)	Jaylen Hoard (20)	Théo Maledon (6)	Paycom Center; 16,961	22–55
78	April 3	Phoenix	W 117–96	Olivier Sarr (24)	Aleksej Pokuševski (10)	Aleksej Pokuševski (12)	Paycom Center; 17,078	23–55
79	April 5	Portland	W 98–94	Jaylen Hoard (24)	Jaylen Hoard (21)	Zavier Simpson (5)	Paycom Center; 14,674	24–55
80	April 6	@ Utah	L 101–137	Jaylen Hoard (23)	Vít Krejčí (6)	Zavier Simpson (11)	Vivint Arena; 18,306	24–56
81	April 8	@ LA Lakers	L 101–120	Jaylen Hoard (27)	Jaylen Hoard (17)	Zavier Simpson (7)	Staples Center; 18,997	24–57
82	April 10	@ LA Clippers	L 88–138	Simpson & Kalaitzakis (17)	Jaylen Hoard (15)	Zavier Simpson (8)	Staples Center; 18,210	24–58

2021–22 season schedule

== Player statistics ==
Legend
GP	Games played	GS	Games started	MPG	Minutes per game
FG%	Field goal percentage	3P%	3-point field goal percentage	FT%	Free throw percentage
RPG	Rebounds per game	APG	Assists per game	SPG	Steals per game
BPG	Blocks per game	PPG	Points per game	**Bold**	Career high

=== Regular season ===
Oklahoma City Thunder statistics
Player	GP	GS	MPG	FG%	3P%	FT%	RPG	APG	SPG	BPG	PPG
Darius Bazley	69	53	27.9	42.2%	29.7%	68.8%	6.3	1.4	0.8	1.0	10.8
Gabriel Deck ^{‡}	7	0	8.0	57.1%	50.0%	-	0.9	0.7	0.1	0.0	2.6
Mamadi Diakite ^{‡}	13	3	14.5	53.2%	0.0%	54.5%	4.5	0.2	0.4	0.7	4.3
Luguentz Dort	51	51	32.6	40.4%	33.2%	84.3%	4.2	1.7	0.9	0.4	17.2
Rob Edwards ^{≠}	2	0	5.5	25.0%	25.0%	-	1.5	0.0	0.0	0.0	1.5
Derrick Favors	39	18	16.7	51.6%	12.5%	64.0%	4.7	0.6	0.4	0.3	5.3
Melvin Frazier Jr. ^{≠}	3	0	40.0	27.1%	4.8%	71.4%	4.3	0.3	0.3	0.0	10.7
Josh Giddey	54	54	31.5	41.9%	26.3%	70.9%	7.8	6.4	0.9	0.4	12.5
Shai Gilgeous-Alexander	56	56	34.7	45.3%	30.0%	81.0%	5.0	5.9	1.3	0.8	24.5
Jaylen Hoard ^{≠}	7	5	34.3	48.9%	36.0%	42.9%	12.0	2.4	0.9	0.7	14.7
Scotty Hopson ^{≠}	1	0	18.0	50.0%	0.0%	-	1.0	1.0	0.0	0.0	4.0
Ty Jerome	48	4	16.7	37.8%	29.0%	80.9%	1.6	2.3	0.6	0.1	7.1
Georgios Kalaitzakis ^{≠}	4	4	41.5	46.4%	36.4%	47.6%	3.3	3.0	2.5	0.3	17.5
Vít Krejčí	30	8	23.0	40.7%	32.7%	86.4%	3.4	1.9	0.6	0.3	6.2
Théo Maledon	51	7	17.8	37.5%	29.3%	79.0%	2.6	2.2	0.6	0.2	7.1
Tre Mann	60	26	22.8	39.3%	36.0%	79.3%	2.9	1.5	0.8	0.2	10.4
Mike Muscala	43	0	13.8	45.6%	42.9%	84.2%	3.0	0.5	0.4	0.6	8.0
Aleksej Pokuševski	61	12	20.2	40.8%	28.9%	70.0%	5.2	2.1	0.6	0.6	7.6
Jeremiah Robinson-Earl	49	36	22.2	41.4%	35.2%	74.1%	5.6	1.0	0.6	0.3	7.5
Isaiah Roby	45	28	21.1	51.4%	44.4%	67.2%	4.8	1.6	0.8	0.8	10.1
Olivier Sarr ^{≠}	22	2	19.1	57.4%	44.8%	82.8%	4.2	0.9	0.3	0.7	7.0
Zavier Simpson ^{≠}	4	4	43.5	36.5%	12.5%	100%	5.3	7.5	1.3	1.0	11.0
Lindy Waters III ^{≠}	25	1	18.6	40.6%	36.3%	80.0%	2.9	1.0	0.8	0.3	8.0
Paul Watson Jr. ^{‡}	9	3	17.3	34.4%	23.1%	50.0%	3.0	0.9	0.3	0.3	3.4
Aaron Wiggins	50	35	24.2	46.3%	30.4%	72.9%	3.6	1.4	0.6	0.2	8.3
Kenrich Williams	49	0	21.9	46.1%	33.9%	54.5%	4.5	2.2	0.9	0.2	7.4

Led team in statistic

After all games.
^{‡} Waived during the season
^{†} Traded during the season
^{≠} Acquired during the season

=== Individual game highs ===
Category	Player	Statistic
Points	Shai Gilgeous-Alexander	39 vs Rockets on December 1, 2021
Rebounds	Jaylen Hoard	21 vs Trail Blazers on April 5, 2022
Assists	Josh Giddey; Shai Gilgeous-Alexander	14 vs Mavericks on January 2, 2022; 14 vs Bucks on March 8, 2022
Steals	Josh Giddey; Darius Bazley; Shai Gilgeous-Alexander; Kenrich Williams; Kenrich Williams; Luguentz Dort; Josh Giddey; Kenrich Williams; Aleksej Pokuševski; Tre Mann; Shai Gilgeous-Alexander	4 vs 76ers on October 24, 2021; 4 vs Lakers on October 27, 2021; 4 vs Rockets on November 17, 2021; 4 vs Pistons on December 6, 2021; 4 vs Raptors on December 8, 2021; 4 vs Pelicans on December 26, 2021; 4 vs Mavericks on January 2, 2022; 4 vs Timberwolves on January 5, 2022; 4 vs Raptors on February 9, 2022; 4 vs Suns on February 24, 2022; 4 vs Jazz on March 6, 2022
Blocks	Isaiah Roby	6 vs Trail Blazers on April 5, 2022
Minutes	Georgios Kalaitzakis	48:00 vs Clippers on April 10, 2022

Category	Player	Statistic
Field goals made	Luguentz Dort; Shai Gilgeous-Alexander; Shai Gilgeous-Alexander	14 vs Rockets on November 17, 2021; 14 vs Timberwolves on March 4, 2022; 14 vs Spurs on March 16, 2022
Threes Made	Tre Mann; Lindy Waters III	7 vs Celtics on March 21, 2022; 7 vs Hawks on March 30, 2022
Free Throws Made	Shai Gilgeous-Alexander	14 vs Rockets on December 1, 2021; 14 vs Kings on December 28, 2021
Double-Doubles	Josh Giddey	16
Triple-Doubles	Josh Giddey	4

== Awards and records ==
=== Awards ===
Date	Player	Award
December 2, 2021	Josh Giddey (1/4)	October/November Rookie of the Month
December 27, 2021	Shai Gilgeous-Alexander (1/1)	December 20–26 Player of the Week
January 4, 2022	Josh Giddey (2/4)	December Rookie of the Month
February 2, 2022	Josh Giddey (3/4)	January Rookie of the Month
March 3, 2022	Josh Giddey (4/4)	February Rookie of the Month
May 18, 2022	Josh Giddey	NBA All-Rookie Second Team

=== Records ===
- On December 2, 2021, the Oklahoma City Thunder took a 73-point loss against the Memphis Grizzlies setting an NBA-record for the worst margin of loss in history.
- On December 27, 2021, Josh Giddey became the second player in NBA history to record a double-double while also going scoreless (Norm Van Lier).
- On January 2, 2022, Giddey became the youngest player in NBA history to record a triple-double with 17 points, 13 rebounds, and 14 assists at 19 years and 84 days, surpassing the record set by LaMelo Ball last season. Giddey also became the youngest player in NBA history to lead all players in points, rebounds, and assists in one game, becoming the second teenager to do so along with Luka Dončić.
- On February 14, 2022, Giddey became the 7th rookie in NBA history to record back-to-back triple-doubles following a triple-double in Chicago the prior day. Giddey also became the third rookie to record a triple-double in his Madison Square Garden debut.
- On February 16, 2022, Giddey, 19, joined Oscar Robertson as the only rookies in league history to record three consecutive triple-doubles.
- On March 21, 2022, Tre Mann set a Thunder rookie record with 35 points on 13-20 shooting, 7 threes. Mann scored 23 of his 35 points on a perfect 6-6 shooting in a single quarter marking the new Thunder rookie record for points in a quarter.
- On March 28, 2022, all five Thunder starters made two or more 3-pointers for the first time in OKC history.
- On April 1, 2022, Jaylen Hoard became the sixth Thunder player to record a 20-rebound game.
- On April 3, 2022, Aleksej Pokuševski became the 12th youngest player in NBA history to record a triple-double with 17 points, 10 rebounds, and 12 assists at 20 years and 98 days old.
- On April 5, 2022, Hoard became the seventh player in OKC history to post a 20-point, 20-rebound game and the fifth to record multiple 20-rebound performances.

== Transactions ==
=== Overview ===
Players Added

Via draft

- Josh Giddey
- Tre Mann
- Aaron Wiggins

Via trade

- Derrick Favors
- Jeremiah Robinson-Earl
  (Draft rights)

Via free agency

- Vít Krejčí
  (Draft rights)
- Paul Watson Jr.
Players Lost

Via trade

- Moses Brown
- Al Horford

Via free agency

- Tony Bradley
- Svi Mykhailiuk

Waived

- Charlie Brown Jr.
- Josh Hall

=== Trades ===
June 18, 2021	To Oklahoma City Thunder Kemba Walker; 2021 first-round pick 2025 second-round pick	To Boston Celtics Al Horford; Moses Brown; 2023 second-round pick
July 30, 2021	To Oklahoma City Thunder Draft rights to Jeremiah Robinson-Earl	To New York Knicks Draft rights to Rokas Jokubaitis; Draft rights to Miles McBride
July 30, 2021	To Oklahoma City Thunder 2022 DET protected first-round pick 2023 WAS protected first-round pick	To Houston Rockets Draft rights to Alperen Şengün
July 30, 2021	To Oklahoma City Thunder Derrick Favors; 2024 protected first-round pick	To Utah Jazz 2027 second-round pick Cash considerations
January 4, 2022	To Oklahoma City Thunder Miye Oni; 2028 second-round pick	To Utah Jazz Cash considerations
February 9, 2022	To Oklahoma City Thunder KZ Okpala; Amendments conditions on a previously traded first-round pick	To Miami Heat 2026 second-round pick

=== Free agency ===
==== Re-signed ====
Date	Player	Contract
August 6, 2021	Shai Gilgeous-Alexander	Multi-Year Extension
August 11, 2021	Mike Muscala	Multi-Year
August 18, 2021	Josh Hall	Two-Way
In-Season Re-Signings
February 12, 2022	Aaron Wiggins	Multi-Year

a: Aaron Wiggins initially signed a two-way contract before it was converted into a multi-year contract.

==== Additions ====
Date	Player	Contract	Former team
September 3, 2021	Vít Krejčí	Standard	(Spain) Basket Zaragoza
September 15, 2021	Paul Watson Jr.	Two-Way	Toronto Raptors
In-Season Additions
December 27, 2021	Rob Edwards	Hardship Exception 10-Day	Oklahoma City Blue (G League)
December 27, 2021	Scotty Hopson	Hardship Exception 10-Day	Oklahoma City Blue (G League)
December 27, 2021	Olivier Sarr	Hardship Exception 10-Day	Oklahoma City Blue (G League)
December 29, 2021	Jaylen Hoard	Hardship Exception 10-Day	Oklahoma City Blue (G League)
January 9, 2022	Olivier Sarr	Second 10-Day	Oklahoma City Thunder
January 11, 2022	Mamadi Diakite	Hardship Exception 10-Day	Milwaukee Bucks
January 21, 2022	Mamadi Diakite	10-Day	Oklahoma City Thunder
January 31, 2022	Mamadi Diakite	Second 10-Day	Oklahoma City Thunder
February 10, 2022	Lindy Waters III	Two-Way	Oklahoma City Blue (G League)
February 21, 2022	Olivier Sarr	Two-Way	Oklahoma City Blue (G League)
April 1, 2022	Jaylen Hoard	Hardship Exception 10-Day	Oklahoma City Blue (G League)
April 5, 2022	Georgios Kalaitzakis	Hardship Exception 10-Day	Oklahoma City Blue (G League)
April 5, 2022	Zavier Simpson	Hardship Exception 10-Day	Oklahoma City Blue (G League)
April 6, 2022	Melvin Frazier Jr.	Two-Way	Iowa Wolves (G League)

==== Subtractions ====
Date	Player	Reason left	New team
August 6, 2021	Kemba Walker	Waived	New York Knicks
August 19, 2021	Tony Bradley	Free Agent	Chicago Bulls
September 1, 2021	Svi Mykhailiuk	Free Agent	Toronto Raptors
September 12, 2021	Josh Hall	Waived	Raptors 905 (G League)
September 26, 2021	Charlie Brown Jr.	Waived	Delaware Blue Coats (G League)
In-Season Subtractions
January 4, 2022	Gabriel Deck	Waived	(Spain) Real Madrid
January 7, 2022	Miye Oni	Waived	(United Kingdom) London Lions
February 9, 2022	Mamadi Diakite	Waived	Cleveland Cavaliers
February 10, 2022	Paul Watson Jr.	Waived	Austin Spurs (G League)
February 11, 2022	KZ Okpala	Waived	Sacramento Kings
April 6, 2022	Olivier Sarr	Waived	Oklahoma City Blue (G League)
