= Aleksej Pokuševski =

Serbian basketball player (born 2001)

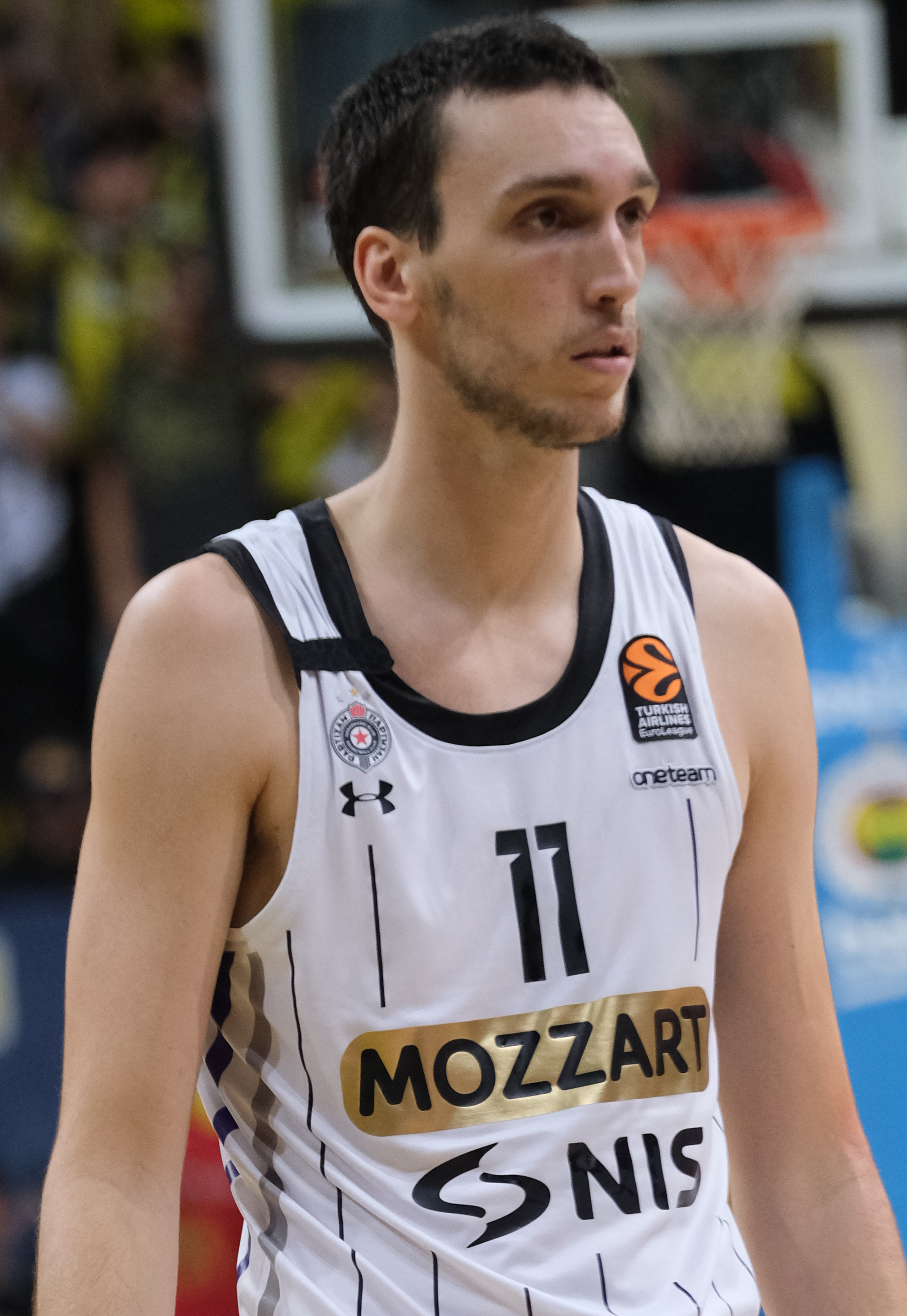
- Pokuševski with Partiza in 2024

No. 17 – Lokomotiv Kuban
- Position: Power forward / center
- League: VTB United League

Personal information
- Born: 26 December 2001 (age 24) Belgrade, Serbia, FR Yugoslavia
- Listed height: 7 ft 0 in (2.13 m)
- Listed weight: 210 lb (95 kg)

Career information
- NBA draft: 2020: 1st round, 17th overall pick
- Drafted by: Minnesota Timberwolves
- Playing career: 2019–present

Career history
- 2019–2020: Olympiacos
- 2019–2020: →Olympiacos B
- 2020–2024: Oklahoma City Thunder
- 2020–2023: →Oklahoma City Blue
- 2024: Charlotte Hornets
- 2024: →Greensboro Swarm
- 2024–2026: Partizan
- 2026–present: Lokomotiv Kuban

Career highlights
- ABA League champion (2025); Serbian League champion (2025)
- Stats at NBA.com
- Stats at Basketball Reference

Aleksej Pokuševski (Serbian Cyrillic: Алексеј Покушевски; born 26 December 2001) is a Serbian professional basketball player for Lokomotiv Kuban of the VTB United League. Standing at 7 ft 0 in (2.13 m) and weighing 210 pounds (95 kg), he plays at both the power forward and center positions.

Born in Belgrade, Pokuševski was previously a youth player for the Greek club Olympiacos. He debuted for their senior team in 2018, at age 17 and becoming the youngest EuroLeague player in club history. He was selected by the Minnesota Timberwolves with the 17th overall pick in the 2020 NBA draft and traded to the Thunder.

== Early career ==
Pokuševski grew up in Novi Sad, where he started to play youth basketball for local clubs, KK Kadet, KK NS Stars and Vojvodina. In 2015, Pokuševski joined the youth system of Olympiacos. In 2017, he participated in the Jordan Brand Classic camp. In August 2018, he attended the Basketball Without Borders Europe camp, in Belgrade, Serbia. In February 2019, Pokuševski was invited for the NBA All-Star Basketball Without Borders Global Camp in Charlotte, North Carolina, but eventually missed the event after being rejected for a U.S. visa.

== Professional career ==
=== Olympiacos (2019–2020) ===
On 19 March 2019, Pokuševski made his EuroLeague debut with Olympiacos, in a 89–69 win over the German club Bayern Munich, during the EuroLeague's 2018–19 season. He recorded 1 point, 2 rebounds and 1 assist, in one minute played during the game. Pokuševski became the youngest senior men's Olympiacos player to ever debut in the EuroLeague. At 17 years and 83 days old, he replaced Georgios Printezis, who had previously debuted in the EuroLeague, at the age of 17 years and 229 days, as the club's youngest-ever EuroLeague player.

For the 2019–20 season, Pokuševski was assigned to play in the Greek A2 League, the country's second-tier league, with Olympiacos' reserve team, Olympiacos B. He initially played for the senior EuroLeague club's practice squad. During the season, Pokuševski missed almost 3 months of playing time, due to a knee injury.

Pokuševski started in eight of his 11 appearances in the Greek A2, averaging 10.8 points, 7.9 rebounds, 3.1 assists, 1.3 steals and 1.8 blocks in 23.1 minutes per game. He shot 40.4 percent from the field, 32.1 percent from three-point range, and 78.3 percent from the free-throw line. In the middle of the season, Olympiacos' main EuroLeague team was riddled with injuries, and Pokuševski was called up to the senior team. He played two minutes in his only EuroLeague game of the season, before the league's season was suspended due to the COVID-19 pandemic in Europe.

On 24 April 2020, Pokuševski declared for the 2020 NBA draft. Pokuševski was under contract with Olympiacos through the end of the 2023–24 season. The contract's buyout clause for the NBA was €1 million if he was a top-20 draft pick, or €1.5 million if he was a top-14 lottery pick. Following selection in the NBA draft, Pokuševski left Olympiacos on 24 November 2020.

=== Oklahoma City Thunder (2020–2024) ===
On November 18, 2020, Pokuševski was selected with the 17th overall pick in the 2020 NBA draft by the Minnesota Timberwolves, becoming the youngest player selected that year. Two days later, his draft rights were sent to the Oklahoma City Thunder in a three-team trade and on 9 December, he signed with the Thunder, becoming the youngest active player in the NBA that season. On 3 February 2021, Pokuševski received his first assignment at the Oklahoma City Blue, the Thunder's affiliate team in the NBA G League and on 14 March, he made his first NBA career start where he scored 23 points, including five 3-pointers, grabbed a career-high 10 rebounds and dished out 4 assists in a 128–122 win over the Memphis Grizzlies, becoming the third Thunder rookie (following Russell Westbrook and Darius Bazley) to post a 20–10 double-double. At 19 years and 78 days old, he became the youngest player in franchise history to score 20-plus points while also setting the record for being the youngest player in league history with 20-plus points, 10-plus rebounds and 5-plus three-pointers made in a game. Pokuševski also became the second-youngest player in NBA history to make five three-pointers in a game behind only LeBron James in 2004.

On April 3, 2022, Pokuševski recorded his first NBA triple-double with 17 points, 10 rebounds, and 12 assists in a 117–96 win over the Phoenix Suns, becoming the seventh Thunder and the 12th-youngest player in NBA history (after Magic Johnson) to achieve a triple-double. Pokuševski made 61 appearances (12 starts) for the Thunder during the 2021–22 NBA season, averaging 7.6 points, 5.2 rebounds, and 2.1 assists.

In July 2022, Pokuševski joined the Thunder for the 2022 NBA Summer League. On November 22, Pokuševski scored 16 points and grabbed 14 rebounds during a 126–122 loss to the Boston Celtics. From December 2022 to March 2023, Pokuševski was unable to play due to a non-displaced tibial plateau fracture in his left leg. He made 34 appearances (including 25 starts) for Oklahoma City during the 2022–23 season, averaging 8.1 points, 4.7 rebounds, and 1.9 assists.

Pokuševski appeared in 10 games for Oklahoma City in the 2023–24 season, posting averages of 1.2 points, 1.0 rebound, and 0.5 assists. On 23 February 2024, Pokuševski was waived by the Thunder.

=== Charlotte Hornets (2024) ===
On 28 February 2024, Pokuševski signed with the Charlotte Hornets. Pokuševski made 18 appearances for the Hornets, recording averages of 7.4 points, 4.4 rebounds, and 1.7 assists. On 6 July, he was waived by Charlotte.

=== Partizan (2024–2026) ===
On 20 August 2024, Pokuševski signed with Partizan of the Serbian SuperLeague, the ABA League, and the EuroLeague. In his debut season with Partizan, Pokuševski averaged 3.9 points and 2.2 rebounds over 27 EuroLeague games. During the 2024–25 season, Partizan managed to lift the record eighth ABA League championship, and the Serbian League championship, the first one after 11 seasons. On 21 July 2026, the team did not activate the additional year included in his contract.

=== Lokomotiv Kuban (2026–present) ===
On 6 August 2026, Pokuševski signed with Lokomotiv Kuban of the VTB United League.

== National team career ==
Pokuševski was a member of the Serbian national under-17 team that competed at the 2018 FIBA Under-17 World Cup, in Argentina. Over seven tournament games, he averaged 7.7 points, 8.3 rebounds, 1.6 assists and 3.0 blocks per game.

Pokuševski was a member of the Serbian national under-18 team that competed at the 2019 FIBA Under-18 European Championship, in Volos, Greece. Over seven tournament games, he averaged 10.0 points, 7.2 rebounds, 3.7 assists, 2.7 steals and 4.0 blocks per game.

Initially at the preliminary Serbia roster for EuroBasket 2022, Pokuševski was cut from the squad due to disapproval of the Thunder.

== Career statistics ==
Legend
GP	Games played	GS	Games started	MPG	Minutes per game
FG%	Field-goal percentage	3P%	3-point field-goal percentage	FT%	Free-throw percentage
RPG	Rebounds per game	APG	Assists per game	SPG	Steals per game
BPG	Blocks per game	PPG	Points per game	PIR	Performance index rating
**Bold**	Career high

=== EuroLeague ===
Year	Team	GP	GS	MPG	FG%	3P%	FT%	RPG	APG	SPG	BPG	PPG	PIR
2018–19	Olympiacos	2	0	2.9	.000	.000	.500	1.0	.5	.5	.0	.5	.0
2019–20	Olympiacos	1	0	1.8	.000	—	—	.0	.0	.0	.0	.0	-2.0
2024–25	Partizan	**27**	**7**	**12.8**	**.455**	**.295**	**.692**	**2.2**	**1.2**	**.6**	**1.0**	**3.9**	**4.7**
Career		30	7	11.8	.436	.289	.667	2.0	1.1	.6	.9	3.5	4.2

=== NBA ===
==== Regular season ====
Year	Team	GP	GS	MPG	FG%	3P%	FT%	RPG	APG	SPG	BPG	PPG
2020–21	Oklahoma City	45	**28**	**24.2**	.341	.280	.738	4.7	**2.2**	.4	.9	**8.2**
2021–22	Oklahoma City	**61**	12	20.2	.408	.289	.700	**5.2**	2.1	.6	.6	7.6
2022–23	Oklahoma City	34	25	20.6	**.434**	**.365**	.629	4.7	1.9	.6	**1.3**	8.1
2023–24	Oklahoma City	10	0	6.0	.250	.182	.500	1.0	.5	.1	.1	1.2
2023–24	Charlotte	18	0	19.2	.429	.364	**.757**	4.4	1.7	**.8**	.7	7.4
Career		168	65	20.4	.391	.304	.702	4.6	1.9	.6	.8	7.5

== Personal life ==
Pokuševski's family originates from Priština. Due to the Kosovo War in 1999, his family escaped to Podgorica (nowadays in Montenegro), and moved to Belgrade, Serbia, afterwards, where Pokuševski was born in 2001. Thereafter, Pokuševski and his family permanently moved to Novi Sad. Pokuševki's ancestors hail from Galicia, present-day Ukraine.

After signing a youth team contract with the Greek basketball club Olympiacos, Pokuševski moved to Greece in 2015, at the age of 13. While playing in Greek competitions, he counts as a native Greek domestic player, since he started competing in Greek competitions before the age of 14. He was eligible to represent either Serbia or Greece in national team competitions, and he chose to represent Serbia. His father Saša Pokuševski, is a former professional basketball player and a coach. His father played basketball with KK Priština, and coached KK Novi Sad.

== See also ==
- List of Serbian NBA players
