= Isaiah Roby =

American basketball player (born 1998)

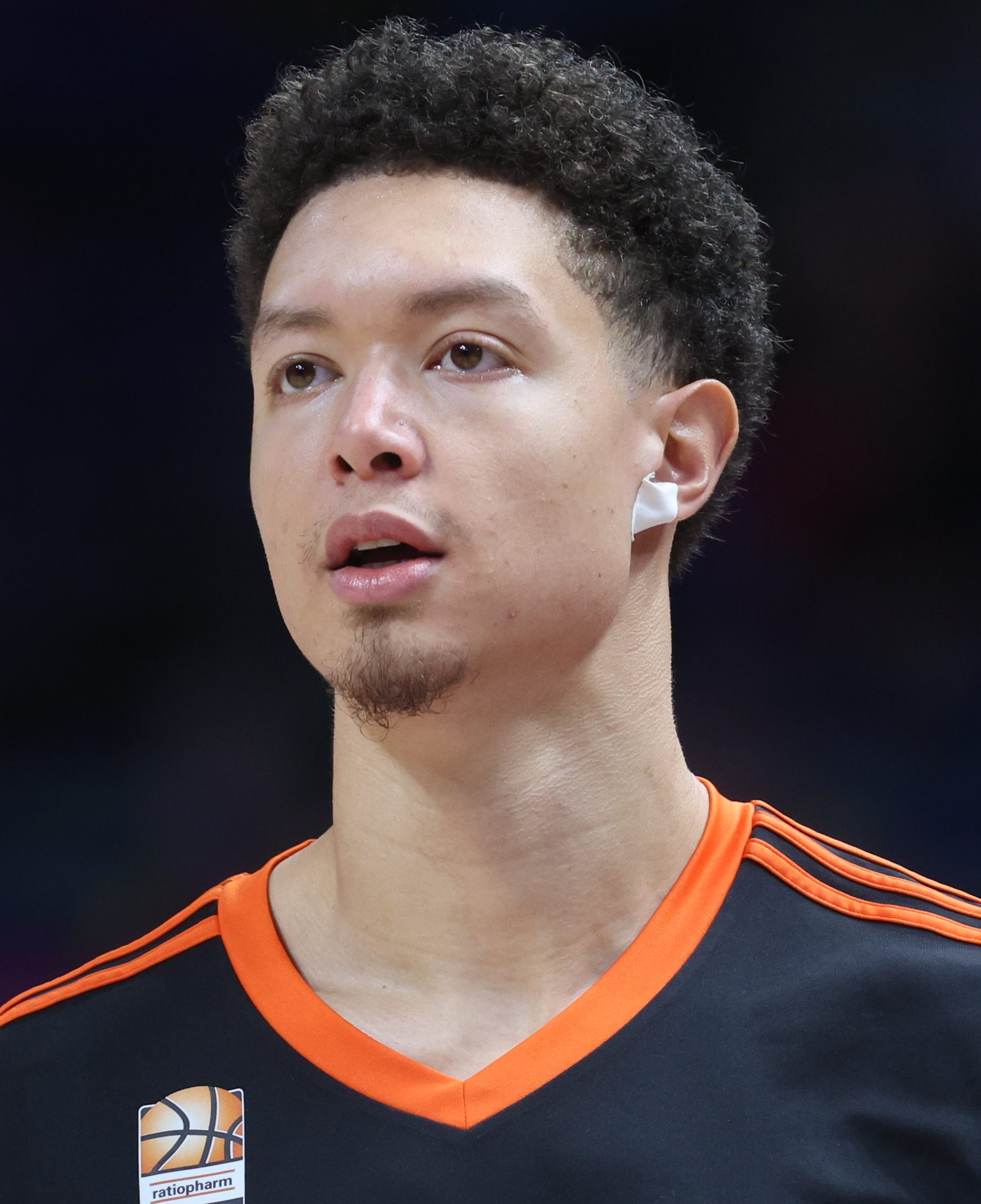
- Roby with Ulm in 2024

No. 22 – Pallacanestro Varese
- Position: Power forward
- League: LBA; Champions League

Personal information
- Born: February 3, 1998 (age 28) Dixon, Illinois, U.S.
- Listed height: 6 ft 8 in (2.03 m)
- Listed weight: 230 lb (104 kg)

Career information
- High school: Dixon (Dixon, Illinois)
- College: Nebraska (2016–2019)
- NBA draft: 2019: 2nd round, 45th overall pick
- Drafted by: Detroit Pistons
- Playing career: 2019–present

Career history
- 2019–2020: Texas Legends
- 2020–2022: Oklahoma City Thunder
- 2020–2022: →Oklahoma City Blue
- 2022–2023: San Antonio Spurs
- 2023–2024: Westchester Knicks
- 2024–2025: ratiopharm Ulm
- 2025–2026: Westchester Knicks
- 2026–present: Pallacanestro Varese

Career highlights
- NBA G League Showcase Cup champion (2023)
- Stats at NBA.com
- Stats at Basketball Reference

Isaiah Owen Roby (born February 3, 1998) is an American professional basketball player for Pallacanestro Varese of the Lega Basket Serie A (LBA). He played college basketball for the Nebraska Cornhuskers.

== High school career ==
Roby attended Dixon High School in Dixon, Illinois. He joined a team that finished its previous season with a 1–28 record, but in his final three years at Dixon, he led the team to a combined 76–13 record. In his junior season, Roby averaged 12.5 points, 9.8 rebounds, 2.6 steals and 3.7 blocks per game, earning second-team all-state Class 3A honors. As a senior, he averaged 19.7 points, 10.5 rebounds, 5.5 assists and 3.9 blocks per game. Roby finished eighth in Illinois Mr. Basketball voting and was named second-team all-state by the Chicago Sun-Times. During high school he competed against future NFL running back James Robinson, who attended rival school Rockford Lutheran. He left Dixon with the most career rebounds and blocks in school history and the second-most career points. Roby was rated a three-star recruit by ESPN and 247Sports, and a four-star recruit by Rivals. On October 22, 2014, he committed to Nebraska.

== College career ==
Roby entered his freshman season for Nebraska in 2016–17 with a pelvic stress reaction suffered in the offseason, delaying his college debut. He remarked, "It's probably the longest I sat out from basketball since I started playing basketball." In 30 games, Roby made four starts and averaged 3.1 points and 2.9 rebounds per game, while recording 25 blocks, the fifth-most by a Nebraska freshman. He increased his weight from 185 pounds (84 kg) to 220 pounds (100 kg) in his first year in college. As a sophomore, Roby averaged 8.7 points and team-highs of 6.3 rebounds and two blocks per game. He also led his team in field goal percentage, shooting 57 percent, and compiled 63 blocks, the most by a Nebraska player since 2001. In his junior season, Roby started in all 35 games, averaging 11.8 points, 6.9 rebounds, and 1.9 blocks per game. He led Nebraska to an unexpected run in the 2019 Big Ten Tournament.

On March 30, 2019, Roby declared for the 2019 NBA draft without hiring an agent.

== Professional career ==
=== Texas Legends (2019–2020) ===
Roby was drafted 45th by the Detroit Pistons and traded to the Dallas Mavericks. On August 7, 2019, Roby officially signed with the Mavericks. The Mavericks assigned him to the Texas Legends for the start of the NBA G League season. He suffered from plantar fasciitis, which caused him to miss several games for the Legends.

=== Oklahoma City Thunder (2020–2022) ===
On January 24, 2020, Roby was traded to the Oklahoma City Thunder by the Mavericks in exchange for Justin Patton and cash considerations. He did not appear in a game during his time with the Mavericks. He made his NBA debut with a brief appearance for the Thunder in January 2020. He was then assigned shortly thereafter to the Oklahoma City Blue, returning to the main Thunder roster for only a single day before being sent back to the Blue.

On December 29, 2020, Roby scored a season-high 19 points, alongside seven rebounds and two blocks, in a 107–118 loss to the Orlando Magic.

On March 28, 2022, Roby scored a career-high 30 points, alongside eight rebounds, four assists and two steals, in a 134–131 win over the Portland Trail Blazers. On July 3, Roby was waived by the Thunder.

=== San Antonio Spurs (2022–2023) ===
On July 5, 2022, Roby was claimed off waivers by the San Antonio Spurs. He made his Spurs debut on October 19, recording five points and two rebounds in a 102–129 loss to the Charlotte Hornets. On March 3, 2023, Roby was waived by the Spurs.

=== Westchester Knicks (2023–2024) ===
On April 9, 2023, Roby signed with the New York Knicks, but was waived on October 18 without playing for the Knicks. Three days later, he re-signed with New York, but was again waived that day. On November 9, Roby was named to the opening night roster for the Westchester Knicks.

=== ratiopharm Ulm (2024–2025) ===
On July 19, 2024, Roby signed with ratiopharm Ulm of the Basketball Bundesliga.

=== Pallacanestro Varese (2026–present) ===
On July 17, 2026, Roby signed with Pallacanestro Varese of the Lega Basket Serie A (LBA).

== Career statistics ==
Legend
GP	Games played	GS	Games started	MPG	Minutes per game
FG%	Field goal percentage	3P%	3-point field goal percentage	FT%	Free throw percentage
RPG	Rebounds per game	APG	Assists per game	SPG	Steals per game
BPG	Blocks per game	PPG	Points per game	**Bold**	Career high

=== NBA ===
Year	Team	GP	GS	MPG	FG%	3P%	FT%	RPG	APG	SPG	BPG	PPG
2019–20	Oklahoma City	3	0	3.7	.000	—	—	.7	.0	.0	.0	.0
2020–21	Oklahoma City	**61**	**34**	**23.4**	.483	.294	**.744**	**5.6**	**1.8**	**.9**	.6	8.7
2021–22	Oklahoma City	45	28	21.1	**.514**	**.444**	.672	4.8	1.6	.8	**.8**	**10.1**
2022–23	San Antonio	42	2	11.3	.432	.300	.488	2.5	.9	.4	.2	4.1
Career		151	64	18.9	.485	.351	.675	4.4	1.4	.7	.5	7.7

=== College ===
Year	Team	GP	GS	MPG	FG%	3P%	FT%	RPG	APG	SPG	BPG	PPG
2016–17	Nebraska	30	4	15.2	.394	.200	**.762**	2.9	.7	.5	.8	3.1
2017–18	Nebraska	32	13	24.0	**.565**	**.405**	.724	6.3	1.7	.6	**2.0**	8.7
2018–19	Nebraska	**35**	**35**	**31.2**	.454	.333	.677	**6.9**	**1.9**	**1.3**	1.9	**11.8**
Career		97	52	23.9	.476	.336	.702	5.5	1.5	.8	1.6	8.1
