= Kenrich Williams =

American basketball player (born 1994)

No. 34 – Oklahoma City Thunder
- Position: Small forward / shooting guard
- League: NBA

Personal information
- Born: December 2, 1994 (age 31) Waco, Texas, U.S.
- Listed height: 6 ft 7 in (2.01 m)
- Listed weight: 210 lb (95 kg)

Career information
- High school: University (Waco, Texas)
- College: New Mexico JC (2013–2014); TCU (2014–2018)
- NBA draft: 2018: undrafted
- Playing career: 2018–present

Career history
- 2018–2020: New Orleans Pelicans
- 2018: →Westchester Knicks
- 2018: →Texas Legends
- 2020–present: Oklahoma City Thunder

Career highlights
- NBA champion (2025); Second-team All-Big 12 (2018); NIT champion (2017); NIT MVP (2017); No. 34 jersey retired by TCU Horned Frogs
- Stats at NBA.com
- Stats at Basketball Reference

Kenrich Lo Williams (/ˈkɛnrɪtʃ/ KEN-ritch; born December 2, 1994), nicknamed "Kenny Hustle", is an American professional basketball player for the Oklahoma City Thunder of the National Basketball Association (NBA). He played college basketball for the TCU Horned Frogs of the Big 12 Conference. After going undrafted, Williams signed with the New Orleans Pelicans in 2018, spending two seasons with the team before being traded to the Thunder in 2020, later winning an NBA championship in 2025.

== High school career ==
Williams attended University High School in Waco, Texas and joined the varsity team as a junior under coach Rodney Smith. As a senior, Williams averaged 14.6 points, 9.9 rebounds and 2.1 steals per game. He earned District 8-4A defensive player of the year honors and led the squad to a 28–5 record. Coming out of high school, Williams did not receive a single Division I offer. He attributes this to playing only one season of AAU ball.

== College career ==
Williams attended New Mexico Junior College and averaged 10.1 points and 6.9 rebounds per game in his freshman season. He was recruited to TCU, which went winless in conference games in the season before his arrival. Williams posted 8.6 points and 6.7 rebounds per game as a sophomore on an 18–15 team. Williams missed the entire 2015–16 season due to a knee injury which required surgery, calling it one of the toughest years of his basketball career as TCU struggled to 12 wins.

As a fourth-year junior, Williams averaged 11.4 points and 9.7 rebounds per game while shooting 49.5 percent from the floor. He had 19 double-doubles, leading the Big 12, and helped lead the team to a 24–15 season. Williams had 18 points and eight rebounds in the 85–82 upset of Kansas in the quarterfinals of the Big 12 tournament. In the second round of the 2017 NIT, an 86–68 win over Richmond, Williams recorded the first triple-double in TCU history with 11 points, 14 rebounds and 10 assists. After posting 25 points and 12 rebounds in the NIT championship game versus Georgia Tech, Williams was named NIT Most Valuable Player.

Coming into his senior season, Williams was a Preseason Big 12 Honorable Mention. On December 6, 2017, Williams scored a career-high 27 points in a 94–83 win over SMU. He sat out a game on December 22, against William & Mary, due to a knee sprain. As a senior, Williams posted 13.2 points and 9.3 rebounds per game, second in the Big 12 Conference. Williams was selected to the USBWA All-District VII and NABC All-District 8 Second Team. He was named to the Second Team All-Big 12. He led TCU to a 21–12 record and #6 seed in the NCAA tournament. In his final game as a Horned Frog, a 57–52 upset loss to Syracuse, Williams scored 14 points.

In 2024, Williams' number 34 jersey was retired by TCU.

== Professional career ==
=== New Orleans Pelicans (2018–2020) ===
After going undrafted in the 2018 NBA draft, Williams signed with the Denver Nuggets for NBA Summer League play. On July 24, Williams signed a deal with the New Orleans Pelicans. Williams later made his professional, NBA debut on October 17, 2018, in a blowout win over the Houston Rockets. During his rookie season, he was assigned to the Westchester Knicks of the NBA G League, making his G League debut on November 23. On January 30, 2019, Williams set a new career high in scoring with 21 points, and set personal bests in field goals (eight), three-pointers (five), assists (three) and minutes (38) in a 99–105 loss to the Denver Nuggets.

=== Oklahoma City Thunder (2020–present) ===
On November 24, 2020, Williams was part of a four-team trade in which he was sent to the Oklahoma City Thunder.

On July 20, 2022, Williams re-signed with the Thunder on a four-year, $27.2 million contract extension. On March 2, 2023, the Thunder announced that he suffered a left wrist injury and would undergo surgery to address the issue, ending his 2022–23 season.

On February 7, 2023, LeBron James broke the all-time NBA scoring record whilst being defended by Williams.

On September 18, 2024, Williams underwent an arthroscopic debridement procedure on his right knee. He made 67 appearances (seven starts) starts for Oklahoma City during the 2024–25 NBA season, averaging 6.3 points, 3.5 rebounds, and 1.4 assists. Williams won the 2025 NBA Finals when the Thunder defeated the Indiana Pacers in seven games.

On September 29, 2025, Williams underwent an arthroscopic procedure on his left knee.

On July 2, 2026, Williams re-signed with the Thunder on a one-year, $5 million contract.

== Career statistics ==
Legend
GP	Games played	GS	Games started	MPG	Minutes per game
FG%	Field goal percentage	3P%	3-point field goal percentage	FT%	Free throw percentage
RPG	Rebounds per game	APG	Assists per game	SPG	Steals per game
BPG	Blocks per game	PPG	Points per game	**Bold**	Career high
†	Won an NBA championship

=== NBA ===
==== Regular season ====
Year	Team	GP	GS	MPG	FG%	3P%	FT%	RPG	APG	SPG	BPG	PPG
2018–19	New Orleans	46	**29**	**23.5**	.384	.333	.684	4.8	1.8	**1.0**	.4	6.1
2019–20	New Orleans	39	18	21.3	.347	.258	.346	4.8	1.5	.7	**.5**	3.5
2020–21	Oklahoma City	66	13	21.6	**.533**	**.444**	.571	4.1	**2.3**	.8	.3	**8.0**
2021–22	Oklahoma City	49	0	21.9	.461	.339	.545	4.5	2.2	.9	.2	7.4
2022–23	Oklahoma City	53	10	22.8	.517	.373	.436	**4.9**	2.0	.8	.3	**8.0**
2023–24	Oklahoma City	**69**	1	14.9	.468	.397	.500	3.0	1.3	.6	.1	4.7
2024–25†	Oklahoma City	**69**	7	16.4	.483	.386	**.718**	3.5	1.4	.6	.1	6.3
2025–26	Oklahoma City	56	2	15.3	.473	.388	.635	3.3	1.4	.6	.1	6.5
Career		447	80	19.3	.471	.368	.564	4.0	1.7	.7	.2	6.4

==== Playoffs ====
Year	Team	GP	GS	MPG	FG%	3P%	FT%	RPG	APG	SPG	BPG	PPG
2024	Oklahoma City	7	0	4.5	.250	.000	—	1.1	.4	.1	.0	.6
2025†	Oklahoma City	**16**	0	**8.6**	**.400**	.200	.500	**2.2**	.4	**.4**	**.1**	2.4
2026	Oklahoma City	11	0	6.5	.387	**.316**	**1.000**	1.8	**.5**	.1	.0	**3.1**
Career		34	0	7.1	.380	.227	.700	1.9	.5	.3	.0	2.3

=== College ===
Year	Team	GP	GS	MPG	FG%	3P%	FT%	RPG	APG	SPG	BPG	PPG
2014–15	TCU	33	17	27.8	.477	.355	.607	6.7	1.4	.9	**1.0**	8.6
2016–17	TCU	**37**	**36**	32.7	**.495**	.363	.586	**9.7**	2.7	1.5	.6	11.4
2017–18	TCU	32	32	**36.0**	.477	**.395**	**.688**	9.3	**3.9**	**1.8**	.5	**13.2**
Career		102	85	32.2	.484	.375	.625	8.6	2.7	1.4	.7	11.0

== Personal life ==
Williams is married and has two daughters.
