= 2020–21 Oklahoma City Thunder season =

NBA professional basketball team season

- Head coach: Mark Daigneault
- General manager: Sam Presti
- Owners: Professional Basketball Club LLC; Clay Bennett (Chairman)
- Arena: Chesapeake Energy Arena

Results
- Record: 22–50 (.306)
- Place: Division: 5th (Northwest); Conference: 14th (Western)
- Playoff finish: Did not qualify
- Stats at Basketball Reference

Local media
- Television: Bally Sports Oklahoma
- Radio: KWPN and WWLS-FM

The 2020–21 Oklahoma City Thunder season was the 13th season of the franchise in Oklahoma City and the 55th in the National Basketball Association (NBA). This is the first season since 2014–15 without head coach Billy Donovan, as he mutually agreed to part ways with the Thunder on September 8, 2020, and 14 days later, went on to become the new head coach of the Chicago Bulls. For the first time since 2012–13, long-time players Steven Adams and André Roberson were not on the roster, as Adams was traded to the New Orleans Pelicans, and Roberson signed with the Brooklyn Nets.

On November 11, the Thunder promoted assistant and former Oklahoma City Blue coach Mark Daigneault as their new head coach. At the age of 35, Daigneault was at the time the youngest active head coach in the NBA, after the Minnesota Timberwolves fired third-year head coach Ryan Saunders on February 21, 2021.

The 2020–21 season was the team's first time since 2014–15 missing the playoffs and their first losing season since 2008–09, the team's inaugural season in Oklahoma City. It was also the fourth time under Sam Presti's tenure that the team had missed the playoffs. Power forward Al Horford, who was acquired by the Thunder via trade on December 8, 2020, also missed the playoffs for the first time in his 14-year career.

== Previous season ==
The Thunder finished the 2019–20 season 44–28 to finish in second place in the Northwest Division, fifth in the Western Conference and qualified for the playoffs.

After falling to the Portland Trail Blazers in the 2019 NBA playoffs, the Thunder started a rebuilding process following the Paul George and Russell Westbrook trades. In the trades, the Thunder received veteran Chris Paul, promising rookie Shai Gilgeous-Alexander, Danilo Gallinari, and seven future first-rounders and four pick swaps. Entering the season, the Thunder were predicted to win 32 games with a 33–49 record projected by ESPN. However, Chris Paul led a resurgence season that featured an All-Star birth and led the Thunder to a 44–28 record.

Before a March 11 game against the Utah Jazz, Rudy Gobert tested positive for COVID-19 prior to tip-off in Oklahoma City. Attendees were told by Chesapeake Energy Arena PA announcer Mario Nanni that the game was postponed "due to unforeseen circumstances", and to safely depart the arena with a reassurance the crowd was "all safe". The league suspended and would not resume play until the 2020 NBA Bubble at Walt Disney World's ESPN Wide World of Sports Complex on July 22.

In the bubble, the Thunder faced off against former Thunder Russell Westbrook and the Houston Rockets. During the series, undrafted rookie Luguentz Dort was lauded for his defense on James Harden. In game seven, Dort led the Thunder with a 30-point performance including six threes in a 104–102 loss.

== Offseason ==
=== Draft Picks ===
Round	Pick	Player	Position	Nationality	College
1	25	Immanuel Quickley	PG	United States	Kentucky
2	53	Cassius Winston	PG	United States	Michigan State
Aleksej Pokuševski, Vít Krejčí, and Théo Maledon were later traded to the Thunder

The Thunder had one first-round pick and one second-round pick entering the draft. The Thunder's own first-round pick was conveyed to the Philadelphia 76ers in the Jerami Grant trade back in 2016. The pick was top-20 protected and was conveyed when Mike Muscala hit a game winner against the Miami Heat in the 2019-20 season. The Thunder acquired a first-round pick from the Denver Nuggets in the Jerami Grant trade back in 2020.

On draft night, the Thunder traded the draft rights to Cassius Winston, the 53rd pick, and a 2024 second-round pick to the Washington Wizards in exchange for Admiral Schofield and the draft rights to Vít Krejčí, the 37th pick. The Thunder also acquired the draft rights to the 28th pick (Jaden McDaniels) and player Danny Green from the Lakers in exchange for Dennis Schroder.

Two days later, the Thunder traded the draft rights to Immanuel Quickley, the 25th pick, to the New York Knicks, and the draft rights to Jaden McDaniels, the 28th pick, to the Minnesota Timberwolves in a three-team trade where the Thunder acquired the draft rights to Aleksej Pokuševski, the 17th pick, James Johnson, and a 2024 second-round pick via MIN. On December 8, the Thunder acquired the draft rights to Théo Maledon, the 34th pick, draft rights to Vasilije Micić, Al Horford and a 2025 first-round pick from the Philadelphia 76ers.

The Thunder, after the 2020 NBA draft night and the conclusion of player acquisitions and transactions, ended with Olympiacos forward Aleksej Pokuševski, ASVEL Villerbaunne guard Théo Maledon, and Casademont Zaragoza guard Vít Krejčí.

=== Trades ===
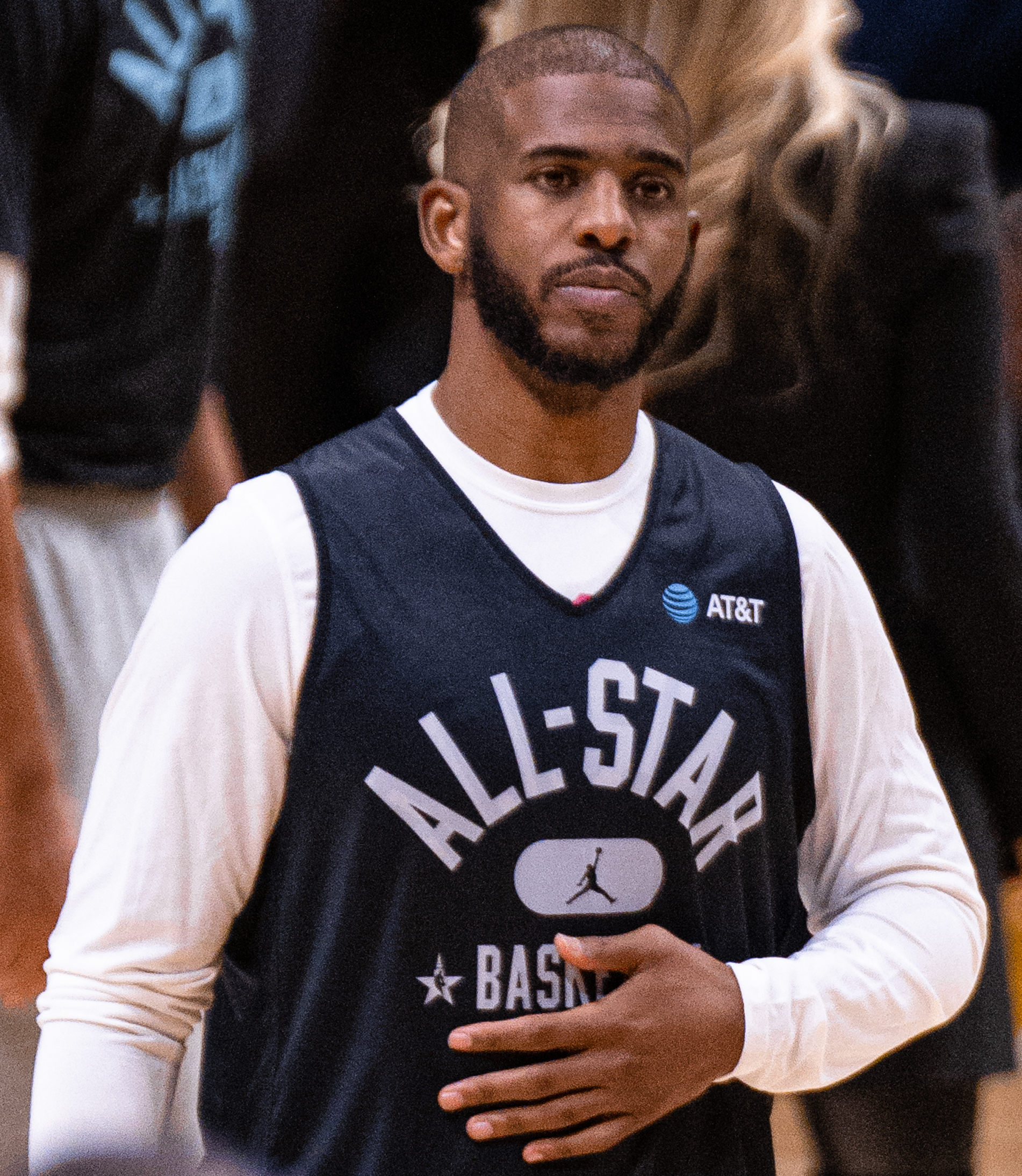
Chris Paul

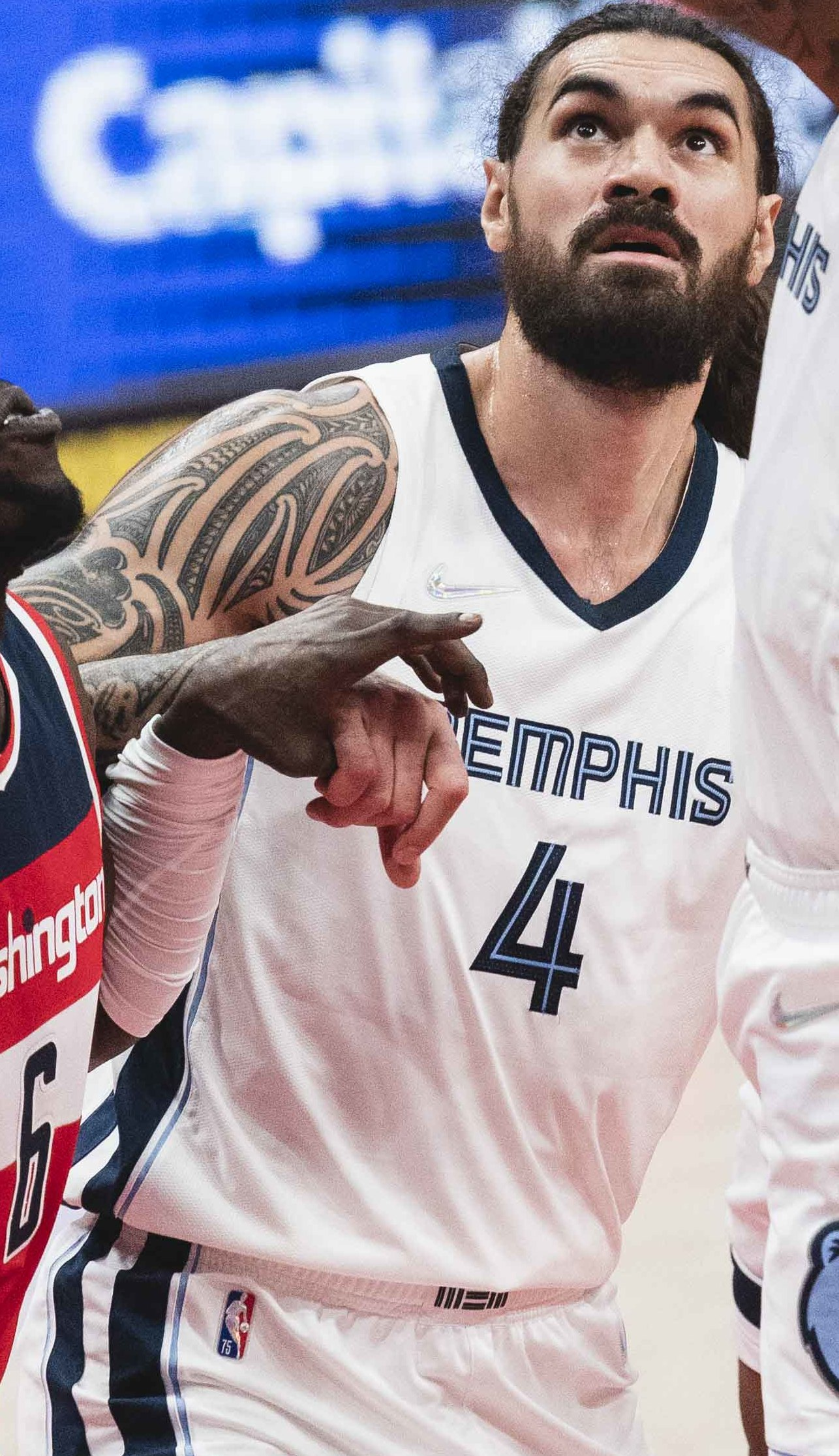
Steven Adams

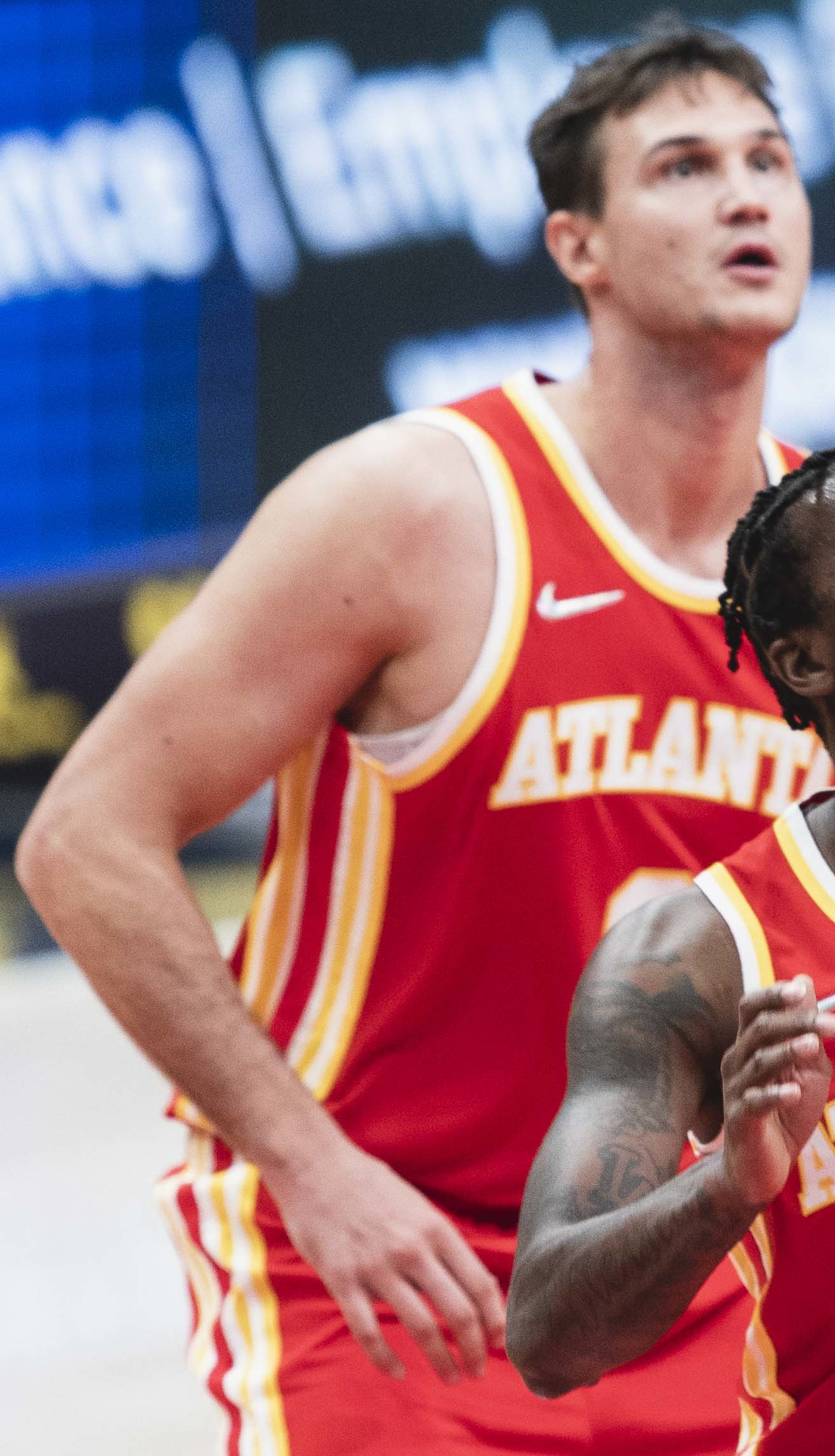
Danilo Gallinari

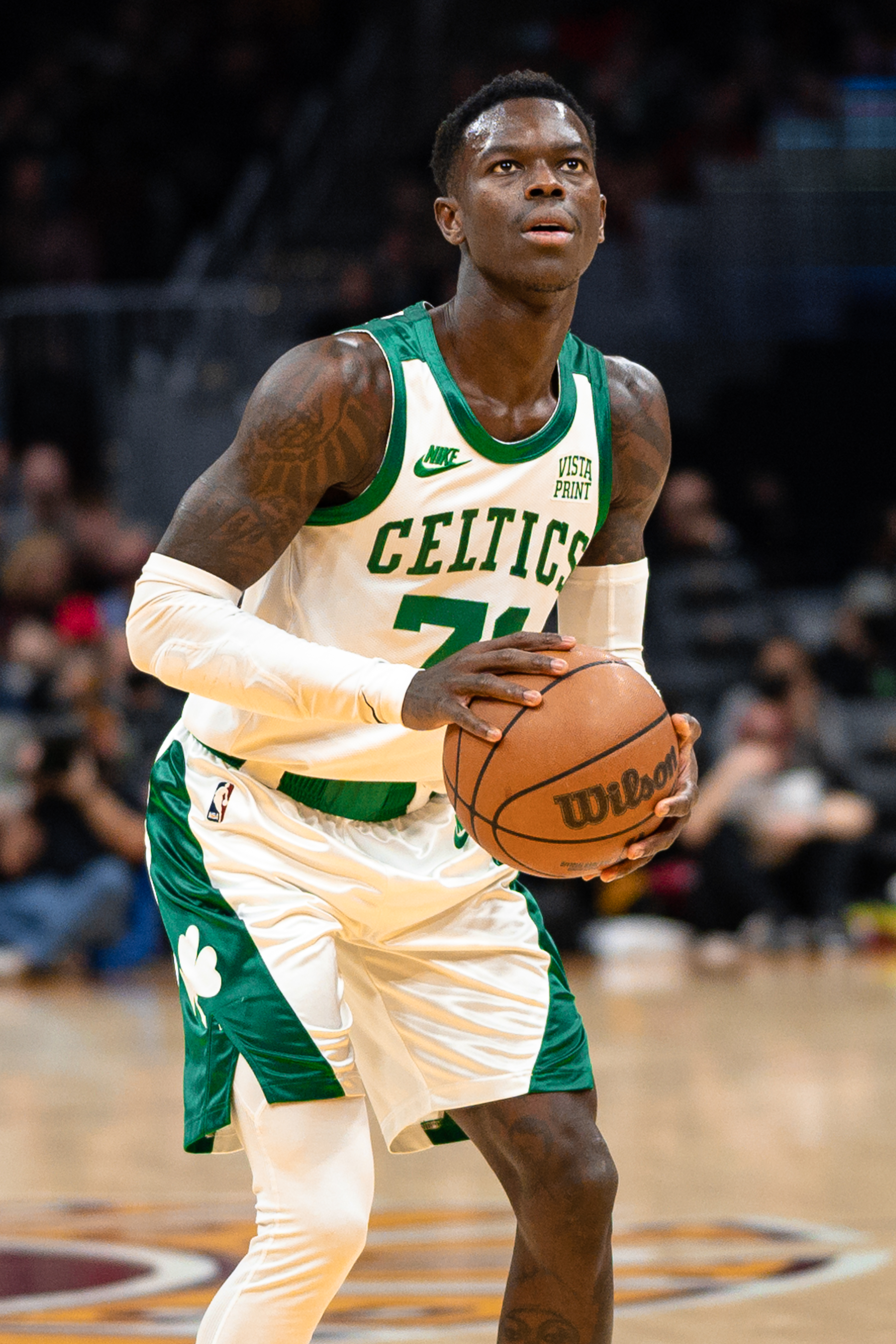
Dennis Schröder

The Thunder traded four veterans to start the rebuild.

The Thunder started this offseason to reposition and rebuild for the future after a surprising 2019-20 season that saw a playoff appearance following the trades of Russell Westbrook and Paul George.

On November 16, the Thunder traded All-Star Chris Paul and Abdel Nader to the Phoenix Suns in exchange for Ty Jerome, Jalen Lecque, Kelly Oubre Jr., Ricky Rubio and a 2022 first-round pick. Paul had a resurgent season during the 2019-20 season, reclaiming his reputation as "Point God," taking the Thunder to a surprising playoff appearance in the 2020 NBA Playoffs. The Thunder began the season with a "0.2%" chance to make the playoffs prior to the start of the season. Paul was named an All-Star and was named to All-NBA Second Team for the first time since 2016. Sam Presti worked with Paul's representatives at CAA to allow Paul to his preferred destination.

We want to thank Chris for the contributions he has made to the Thunder and the Oklahoma City community both this season and during his initial tenure in 2005-06 with the Hornets. Chris has been the consummate leader and has left a tremendous legacy in a short period of time. We wish him and Abdel and their families only the best moving forward.

— Sam Presti

On draft night November 18, the Thunder traded Dennis Schröder to the Los Angeles Lakers in exchange for Danny Green and the draft rights to Jaden McDaniels, the twenty-eighth pick. Schröder led the league in points scored off the bench and finished second in NBA Sixth Man of the Year voting. A day later on November 19, the Thunder traded a protected 2021 second-round pick to the Boston Celtics in exchange for Vincent Poirier in an effort to use his salary in a bigger trade. The same day, the Thunder traded the draft rights to Cassius Winston, the fifty-third pick, and a 2024 second-round pick to the Washington Wizards in exchange for the draft rights to Vít Krejčí and Admiral Schofield. On December 18, the Thunder waived Admiral Schofield. Two days later on November 20, the Thunder traded the draft rights to Jaden McDaniels and Ricky Rubio to the Minnesota Timberwolves in a three team trade, for the draft rights to Aleksej Pokuševski, the seventeenth pick, James Johnson and a 2024 second-round pick. The Thunder also traded the draft rights to Immanuel Quickley, the twenty-fifth pick, to the New York Knicks as part of the three team trade.

On November 22, the Thunder traded Kelly Oubre Jr., originally acquired from the Suns, to the Golden State Warriors in exchange for a protected 2021 first-round pick and a 2021 second-round pick via DEN. The first-round pick acquired was top-20 protected by Golden State and will be converted into two second-round picks if not conveyed.

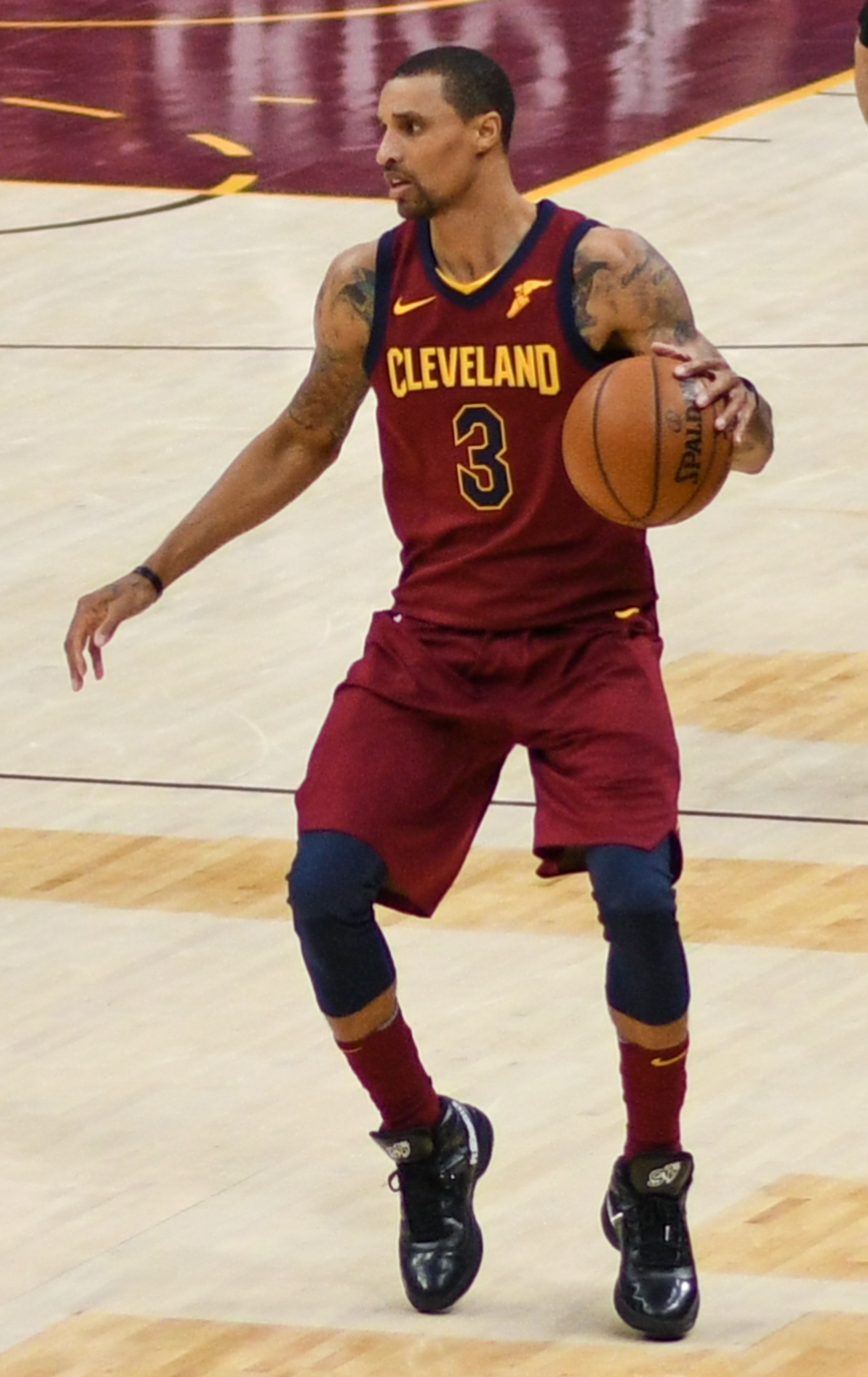
George Hill

On November 24, the Thunder traded Steven Adams to the New Orleans Pelicans in a four team trade, for George Hill from Milwaukee, Zylan Cheatham from New Orleans, Josh Gray from New Orleans, Darius Miller from New Orleans, Kenrich Williams from New Orleans, a 2023 first-round pick from Denver, a 2023 second-round pick (via WAS) from New Orleans and a 2024 second-round pick (via CHA) from New Orleans. The Thunder also generated a trade exception worth $27.5 million, the largest in NBA history to date. Adams was the longest tenured player on the roster since being drafted back in 2013.

Steven Adams will hold a special place in our organizational legacy. On and off the floor, Steven contributed to our teams and community in unique ways and his place in Thunder history is secured.

— Sam Presti

On December 1 and December 2, the Thunder waived Josh Gray and Zylan Cheatham. The same day on November 24, the Thunder signed-and-traded Danilo Gallinari and cash considerations to the Atlanta Hawks in exchange for a protected 2025 second-round pick while generating another trade exception worth $19.5 million.

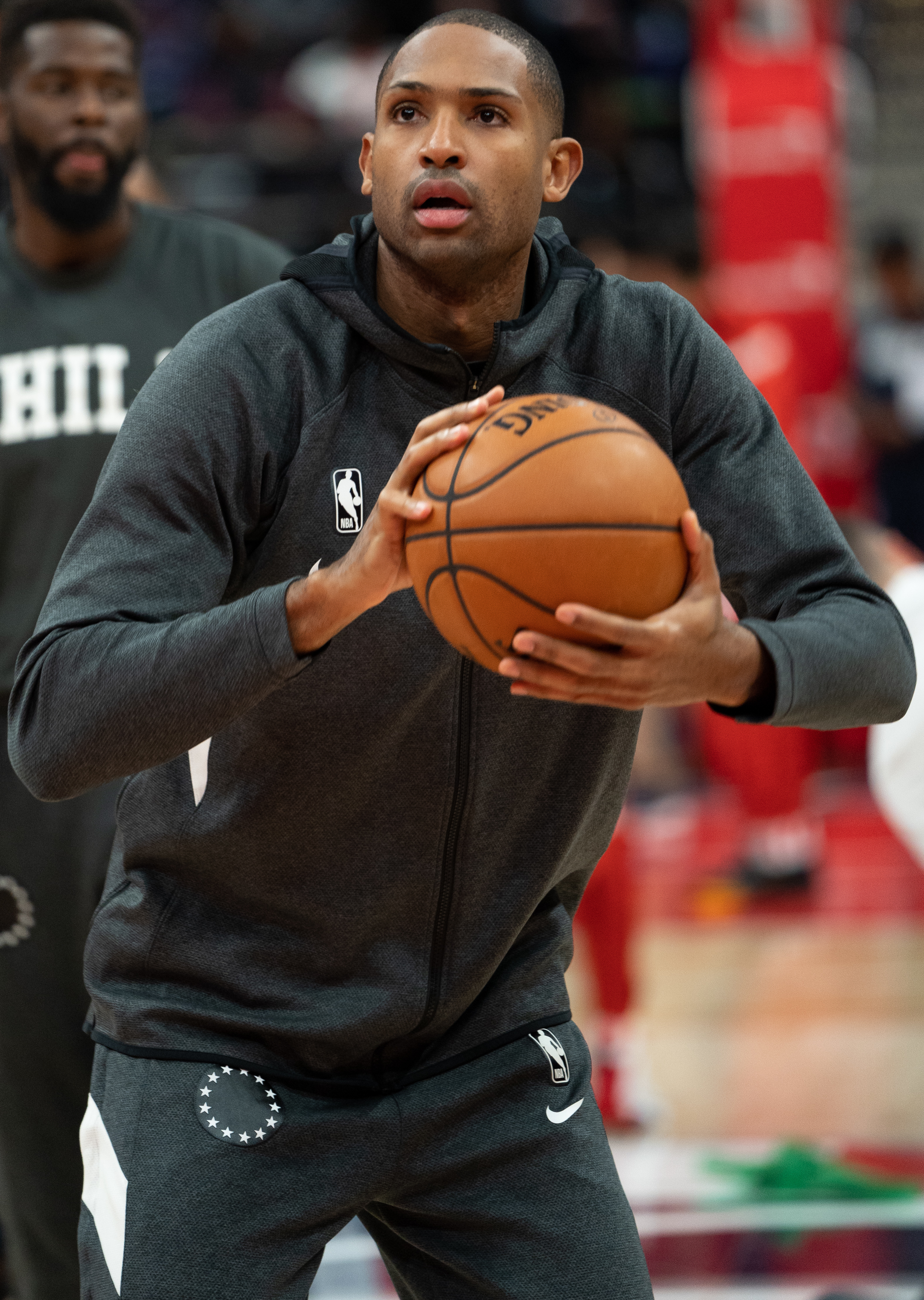
Al Horford

On November 25, the Thunder traded Jalen Lecque, originally acquired from the Suns, to the Indiana Pacers in exchange for T. J. Leaf and a 2027 second-round pick. On December 18, the Thunder waived T. J. Leaf. On November 27, the Thunder traded James Johnson, originally acquired from the Timberwolves in a three team trade, for Trevor Ariza from Detroit, Justin Jackson from Dallas, a 2023 second-round pick (best of DAL or MIA) from Dallas and a 2026 second-round pick from Dallas. Ariza would never report to the Thunder while attending to personal issues that kept him out of the 2020 NBA Playoffs.

On December 8, the Thunder traded Terrance Ferguson, Danny Green, originally acquired from the Lakers, and Vincent Poirier, originally acquired from the Celtics to the Philadelphia 76ers in exchange for Al Horford, the draft rights to Théo Maledon, the thirty-fourth pick, the draft rights to Vasilije Micić, the fifty-second pick in the 2014 NBA draft, and a 2025 first-round pick. Horford, who signed a four-year, $109 million deal, did not fit with Joel Embiid saw his role diminished and was eventually removed from the starting lineup. Micic was a second-round pick in 2014 was named to a second-team All-EuroLeague selection in 2019.

At the end of offseason, the Thunder accumulated 17 first-round picks through the 2026 NBA draft.

=== Free agency ===
For this offseason, free agency began on November 20, 2020, while the moratorium ended on November 22. Deonte Burton, Danilo Gallinari, Devon Hall, Kevin Hervey, Nerlens Noel and Andre Roberson were set to hit free agency. On September 21, Kevin Hervey signed a contract with the Russian team Lokomotiv Kuban of the VTB United League. Hervey was originally set to reach free agency in fall but the Thunder let him out of his contract early to be lined up with an international team. On November 20, it was reported that Danilo Gallinari agreed to a three-year, $61.5 million deal with the Atlanta Hawks, which he later signed on November 24. The Thunder negotiated a sign-and-trade deal to acquire a protected 2025 second-round pick and generating a trade exception. On November 21, it was reported that Nerlens Noel agreed to a one-year contract with the New York Knicks, which he later signed on November 25. Burton, Hall and Roberson who were not re-signed, joined the Maine Celtics of the NBA G League, Brose Bamberg and the Brooklyn Nets respectively.

On December 9, Moses Brown and Josh Hall both signed a two-way contract with the Thunder, splitting time with the Thunder and the Oklahoma City Blue. Brown spent the 2019-20 season with the Portland Trail Blazers. Hall came undrafted out of Moravian Prep high school out of Hudson, North Carolina.

=== Front office and coaching changes ===
After the Thunder's defeat in the 2020 NBA Playoffs, head coach Billy Donovan and the Thunder mutually agreed to part ways on September 8, 2020, after five seasons with the team. Donovan was named head coach of the Thunder on April 30, 2015, taking over for Scott Brooks after the 2014-15 season. Donovan accumulated a 243-157 (.608) record with playoff appearances in each season, including a trip to the Western Conference Finals during the 2016 NBA Playoffs. Donovan was also named co-recipient of the 2020 NBCA Coach of the Year.

On November 11, the Thunder hired Mark Daigneault, an assistant since last season, as head coach. Daigneault became the fourth head coach of the Thunder since moving to Oklahoma City. Daigneault spent five seasons as the head coach of the Oklahoma City Blue accumulating three consecutive division titles and four playoff appearances including a franchise-record 34 wins.

On November 25, the Thunder announced Mike Wilks, Dave Bliss, David Akinyooye, Mike Miller as assistant coaches and Zach Peterson and Kameron Woods as player development coaches. Miller joins the Thunder after serving as interim head coach of the New York Knicks. Woods joins the Thunder after serving two seasons as an assistant coach for the Oklahoma City Blue.

== Roster ==
2020–21 Oklahoma City Thunder roster
Players

Pos.	No.	Player	Height	Weight	DOB	From
G/F	7	Darius Bazley (injured)	6 ft 8 in (2.03 m)	208 lb (94 kg)	2000-06-12	Princeton HS (OH)
C	13	Tony Bradley	6 ft 11 in (2.11 m)	248 lb (112 kg)	1998-08-01	North Carolina
G	44	Charlie Brown	6 ft 6 in (1.98 m)	199 lb (90 kg)	1997-02-02	Saint Joseph's
C	9	Moses Brown	7 ft 2 in (2.18 m)	245 lb (111 kg)	1999-10-13	UCLA
F	6	Gabriel Deck	6 ft 6 in (1.98 m)	231 lb (105 kg)	1995-02-08	Argentina
G	5	Luguentz Dort (injured)	6 ft 3 in (1.91 m)	215 lb (98 kg)	1999-04-19	Arizona State
G	2	Shai Gilgeous-Alexander (injured)	6 ft 6 in (1.98 m)	180 lb (82 kg)	1998-07-12	Kentucky
G	15	Josh Hall (TW)	6 ft 9 in (2.06 m)	190 lb (86 kg)	2000-10-08	Moravian Prep (NC)
F	8	Jaylen Hoard (TW)	6 ft 8 in (2.03 m)	216 lb (98 kg)	1999-03-30	Wake Forest
F/C	42	Al Horford	6 ft 9 in (2.06 m)	240 lb (109 kg)	1986-06-03	Florida
G	16	Ty Jerome (injured)	6 ft 5 in (1.96 m)	195 lb (88 kg)	1997-07-08	Virginia
G	11	Théo Maledon	6 ft 4 in (1.93 m)	175 lb (79 kg)	2001-06-12	France
F/C	33	Mike Muscala (injured)	6 ft 11 in (2.11 m)	240 lb (109 kg)	1991-07-01	Bucknell
G/F	14	Sviatoslav Mykhailiuk	6 ft 7 in (2.01 m)	205 lb (93 kg)	1997-06-10	Kansas
F	17	Aleksej Pokuševski	7 ft 0 in (2.13 m)	190 lb (86 kg)	2001-12-26	Serbia
F	22	Isaiah Roby	6 ft 8 in (2.03 m)	230 lb (104 kg)	1998-02-03	Nebraska
G/F	34	Kenrich Williams	6 ft 6 in (1.98 m)	210 lb (95 kg)	1994-12-02	TCU

Coaches
Head coach
- Mark Daigneault
Assistant(s)
- David Akinyooye
- Dave Bliss
- Mike Miller
- Mike Wilks

Legend
- (DP) Unsigned draft pick
- (FA) Free agent
- (S) Suspended
- (GL) On assignment to G League affiliate
- (TW) Two-way affiliate player
- Injured

Roster
Updated: May 15, 2021

== Standings ==
=== Conference ===
Western Conference
#	Team	W	L	PCT	GB	GP
1	z – Utah Jazz *	52	20	.722	–	72
2	y – Phoenix Suns *	51	21	.708	1.0	72
3	x – Denver Nuggets	47	25	.653	5.0	72
4	x – Los Angeles Clippers	47	25	.653	5.0	72
5	y – Dallas Mavericks *	42	30	.583	10.0	72
6	x – Portland Trail Blazers	42	30	.583	10.0	72
7	x – Los Angeles Lakers	42	30	.583	10.0	72
8	pi – Golden State Warriors	39	33	.542	13.0	72
9	x – Memphis Grizzlies	38	34	.528	14.0	72
10	pi – San Antonio Spurs	33	39	.458	19.0	72
11	New Orleans Pelicans	31	41	.431	21.0	72
12	Sacramento Kings	31	41	.431	21.0	72
13	Minnesota Timberwolves	23	49	.319	29.0	72
14	Oklahoma City Thunder	22	50	.306	30.0	72
15	Houston Rockets	17	55	.236	35.0	72

=== Division ===
Northwest Division	W	L	PCT	GB	Home	Road	Div	GP
z – Utah Jazz	52	20	.722	–	31‍–‍5	21‍–‍15	7–5	72
x – Denver Nuggets	47	25	.653	5.0	25‍–‍11	22‍–‍14	9–3	72
x – Portland Trail Blazers	42	30	.583	10.0	20‍–‍16	22‍–‍14	6–6	72
Minnesota Timberwolves	23	49	.319	29.0	13‍–‍23	10‍–‍26	5–7	72
Oklahoma City Thunder	22	50	.306	30.0	10‍–‍26	12‍–‍24	3–9	72

== Game log ==
=== Preseason ===
2020 preseason game log
Total: 1–2 (Home: 0–2; Road:1–0)
Preseason: 1–2 (home: 0–2; road: 1–0)

Game	Date	Team	Score	High points	High rebounds	High assists	Location Attendance	Record
1	December 12	@ San Antonio	W 121–108	Théo Maledon (20)	Isaiah Roby (11)	Shai Gilgeous-Alexander (4)	AT&T Center; No In-Person Attendance	1–0
2	December 16	Chicago	L 103–124	Horford & Jackson (15)	Al Horford (7)	Gilgeous-Alexander & Roby (3)	Chesapeake Energy Arena; No In-Person Attendance	1–1
3	December 18	Chicago	L 103–105	Al Horford (17)	Aleksej Pokuševski (13)	Shai Gilgeous-Alexander (5)	Chesapeake Energy Arena; No In-Person Attendance	1–2

2020–21 season schedule

=== Regular season ===
2020–21 game log
Total: 22–50 (Home: 10–26; Road: 12–24)
December: 1–3 (home: 0–3; road: 1–0)

Game	Date	Team	Score	High points	High rebounds	High assists	Location Attendance	Record
-	December 23	@ Houston	Postponed (COVID-19) (Makeup date: March 21)					
1	December 26	@ Charlotte	W 109–107	Shai Gilgeous-Alexander (24)	Al Horford (13)	Shai Gilgeous-Alexander (9)	Spectrum Center; 0	1–0
2	December 28	Utah	L 109–110	Luguentz Dort (26)	Darius Bazley (11)	Shai Gilgeous-Alexander (7)	Chesapeake Energy Arena; 0	1–1
3	December 29	Orlando	L 107–118	Shai Gilgeous-Alexander (23)	Hamidou Diallo (8)	Shai Gilgeous-Alexander (7)	Chesapeake Energy Arena; 0	1–2
4	December 31	New Orleans	L 80–113	Al Horford (17)	Roby & Al Horford (6)	Gilgeous-Alexander, Hill & Pokuševski (4)	Chesapeake Energy Arena; 0	1–3

January: 7–7 (home: 1–3; road: 6–4)

Game	Date	Team	Score	High points	High rebounds	High assists	Location Attendance	Record
5	January 2	@ Orlando	W 108–99	Darius Bazley (19)	Darius Bazley (12)	Shai Gilgeous-Alexander (7)	Amway Center; 3,339	2–3
6	January 4	@ Miami	L 90–118	Shai Gilgeous-Alexander (18)	Darius Bazley (8)	Shai Gilgeous-Alexander (4)	American Airlines Arena; 0	2–4
7	January 6	@ New Orleans	W 111–110	Shai Gilgeous-Alexander (21)	Darius Bazley (12)	Shai Gilgeous-Alexander (9)	Smoothie King Center; Limited Seating	3–4
8	January 8	@ New York	W 101–89	Shai Gilgeous-Alexander (25)	Hamidou Diallo (11)	Shai Gilgeous-Alexander (7)	Madison Square Garden; 0	4–4
9	January 10	@ Brooklyn	W 129–116	Shai Gilgeous-Alexander (31)	Gilgeous-Alexander, Horford (6)	Shai Gilgeous-Alexander (7)	Barclays Center; 0	5–4
10	January 12	San Antonio	L 102–112	Shai Gilgeous-Alexander (20)	Shai Gilgeous-Alexander (9)	George Hill (5)	Chesapeake Energy Arena; 0	5–5
11	January 13	L. A. Lakers	L 99–128	Shai Gilgeous-Alexander (17)	Isaiah Roby (9)	Maledon, Roby, Williams (4)	Chesapeake Energy Arena; 0	5–6
12	January 15	Chicago	W 127–125	Shai Gilgeous-Alexander (33)	Luguentz Dort (8)	Shai Gilgeous-Alexander (10)	Chesapeake Energy Arena; 0	6–6
-	January 17	Philadelphia	Postponed (COVID-19) (Makeup date: April 10)					
13	January 19	@ Denver	L 101–119	Luguentz Dort (20)	Isaiah Roby (9)	Shai Gilgeous-Alexander (7)	Ball Arena; 0	6–7
14	January 22	@ L. A. Clippers	L 106–120	Shai Gilgeous-Alexander (30)	Maledon & Hill (5)	Shai Gilgeous-Alexander (8)	Staples Center; 0	6–8
15	January 24	@ L. A. Clippers	L 100–108	Shai Gilgeous-Alexander (23)	Darius Bazley (11)	Shai Gilgeous-Alexander (11)	Staples Center; 0	6–9
16	January 25	@ Portland	W 125–122	Shai Gilgeous-Alexander (24)	Shai Gilgeous-Alexander (9)	Shai Gilgeous-Alexander (6)	Moda Center; 0	7–9
17	January 27	@ Phoenix	W 102–97	Horford & Gilgeous-Alexander (21)	Al Horford (11)	Shai Gilgeous-Alexander (8)	Mortgage Matchup Center; 0	8–9
18	January 29	Brooklyn	L 125–147	Gilgeous-Alexander & Maledon (24)	Al Horford (6)	Shai Gilgeous-Alexander (5)	Chesapeake Energy Arena; 0	8–10

February: 6–10 (home: 6–5; road: 0–5)

Game	Date	Team	Score	High points	High rebounds	High assists	Location Attendance	Record
19	February 1	Houston	L 106–136	Shai Gilgeous-Alexander (19)	Al Horford (7)	Shai Gilgeous-Alexander (5)	Chesapeake Energy Arena; 0	8–11
20	February 3	Houston	W 104–87	Kenrich Williams (19)	Darius Bazley (12)	Théo Maledon (4)	Chesapeake Energy Arena; 0	9–11
21	February 5	Minnesota	L 103–106	Al Horford (26)	Darius Bazley (10)	Hamidou Diallo (10)	Chesapeake Energy Arena; 0	9–12
22	February 6	Minnesota	W 120–118	Shai Gilgeous-Alexander (31)	Gilgeous-Alexander, Williams (9)	Shai Gilgeous-Alexander (7)	Chesapeake Energy Arena; 0	10–12
23	February 8	@ L. A. Lakers	L 112–119 (OT)	Shai Gilgeous-Alexander (29)	Darius Bazley (16)	Shai Gilgeous-Alexander (10)	Staples Center; 0	10–13
24	February 10	@ L. A. Lakers	L 113–114 (OT)	Al Horford (25)	Hamidou Diallo (13)	Al Horford (28)	Staples Center; 0	10–14
25	February 12	@ Denver	L 95–97	Justin Jackson (20)	Kenrich Williams (11)	Kenrich Williams (9)	Ball Arena; 0	10–15
26	February 14	Milwaukee	W 114–109	Al Horford (20)	Hamidou Diallo (13)	Al Horford (9)	Chesapeake Energy Arena; 0	11–15
27	February 16	Portland	L 104–115	Luguentz Dort (23)	Isaiah Roby (10)	Darius Bazley (6)	Chesapeake Energy Arena; 0	11–16
28	February 17	@ Memphis	L 113–122	Shai Gilgeous-Alexander (22)	Isaiah Roby (8)	Shai Gilgeous-Alexander (6)	FedEx Forum; 0	11–17
29	February 19	@ Milwaukee	L 85–98	Luguentz Dort (17)	Muscala, Roby (7)	Shai Gilgeous-Alexander (5)	Fiserv Forum; 750	11–18
30	February 21	Cleveland	W 117–101	Shai Gilgeous-Alexander (31)	Al Horford (8)	Shai Gilgeous-Alexander (9)	Rocket Mortgage FieldHouse; 2,720	12–18
31	February 22	Miami	L 94–108	Shai Gilgeous-Alexander (27)	Dort, Williams (7)	Gilgeous-Alexander, Maledon (7)	Chesapeake Energy Arena; 0	12–19
32	February 24	San Antonio	W 102–99	Shai Gilgeous-Alexander (42)	Darius Bazley (10)	Al Horford (7)	Chesapeake Energy Arena; 0	13–19
33	February 26	Atlanta	W 118–109	Shai Gilgeous-Alexander (24)	Darius Bazley (12)	Théo Maledon (7)	Chesapeake Energy Arena; 0	14–19
34	February 27	Denver	L 96–126	Darius Bazley (22)	Isaiah Roby (9)	Isaiah Roby (7)	Chesapeake Energy Arena; 0	14–20

March: 6–7 (home: 3–4; road: 3–3)

Game	Date	Team	Score	High points	High rebounds	High assists	Location Attendance	Record
35	March 3	Dallas	L 78–87	Shai Gilgeous-Alexander (15)	Darius Bazley (10)	Shai Gilgeous-Alexander (3)	American Airlines Center; 3,508	14–21
36	March 4	@ San Antonio	W 107–102	Shai Gilgeous-Alexander (33)	Darius Bazley (10)	Shai Gilgeous-Alexander (8)	AT&T Center; 1,000	15–21
37	March 11	Dallas	W 116–108	Shai Gilgeous-Alexander (32)	Moses Brown (12)	Théo Maledon (9)	Chesapeake Energy Arena; 0	16–21
38	March 13	New York	L 97–119	Al Horford (16)	Moses Brown (9)	Dort & Jerome (9)	Chesapeake Energy Arena; 0	16–22
39	March 14	Memphis	W 128–122	Shai Gilgeous-Alexander (30)	Aleksej Pokuševski (10)	Jerome & Gilgeous-Alexander (5)	Chesapeake Energy Arena; 0	17–22
40	March 16	@ Chicago	L 102–123	Shai Gilgeous-Alexander (21)	Moses Brown (16)	Kenrich Williams (4)	United Center; 0	17–23
41	March 18	@ Atlanta	L 93–116	Shai Gilgeous-Alexander (19)	Isaiah Roby (8)	Théo Maledon (5)	State Farm Arena; 2,621	17–24
42	March 21	@ Houston	W 114–112	Luguentz Dort (23)	Moses Brown (14)	Ty Jerome (5)	Toyota Center; 3,297	18–24
43	March 22	@ Minnesota	W 112–103	Shai Gilgeous-Alexander (31)	Moses Brown (18)	Ty Jerome (6)	Target Center; 0	19–24
44	March 24	Memphis	L 107–116	Moses Brown (19)	Moses Brown (12)	Al Horford (6)	Chesapeake Energy Arena; 0	19–25
45	March 27	Boston	L 94–111	Théo Maledon (22)	Moses Brown (23)	Aleksej Pokuševski (5)	Chesapeake Energy Arena; 0	19–26
46	March 29	Dallas	L 106–127	Aleksej Pokuševski (21)	Brown, Roby (9)	Ty Jerome (5)	Chesapeake Energy Arena; 0	19–27
47	March 31	Toronto	W 113–103	Svi Mykhailiuk (22)	Moses Brown (12)	Théo Maledon (6)	Chesapeake Energy Arena; 0	20–27

April: 1–15 (home: 0–7; road: 1–8)

Game	Date	Team	Score	High points	High rebounds	High assists	Location Attendance	Record
48	April 2	@ Phoenix	L 103–140	Théo Maledon (33)	Moses Brown (7)	Aleksej Pokuševski (4)	Phoenix Suns Arena; 3,422	20–28
49	April 3	@ Portland	L 85–133	Kenrich Williams (18)	Moses Brown (14)	Jerome & Pokuševski (4)	Moda Center; 0	20–29
50	April 5	Detroit	L 108–132	Aleksej Pokuševski (19)	Tony Bradley (9)	Ty Jerome (5)	Chesapeake Energy Arena; 0	20–30
51	April 7	Charlotte	L 102–113	Jalen McDaniels (21)	Cody Zeller (14)	Brad Wanamaker (6)	Chesapeake Energy Arena; 0	20–31
52	April 8	Cleveland	L 102–129	Ty Jerome (23)	Moses Brown(11)	Kenrich Williams (9)	Chesapeake Energy Arena; 0	20–32
53	April 10	Philadelphia	L 93–117	Darius Bazley (17)	Tony Bradley (14)	Bazley, Jerome, Maledon (5)	Chesapeake Energy Arena; 0	20–33
54	April 13	@ Utah	L 96–106	Luguentz Dort (42)	Moses Brown (15)	Luguentz Dort (3)	Vivint Arena; 5,546	20–34
55	April 14	Golden State	L 109–147	Darius Bazley (22)	Moses Brown (12)	Théo Maledon (5)	Chesapeake Energy Arena; 0	20–35
56	April 16	@ Detroit	L 104–110	Luguentz Dort (26)	Moses Brown (8)	Kenrich Williams (4)	Little Caesars Arena; 750	20–36
57	April 18	@ Toronto	L 106–111	Luguentz Dort (29)	Bazley, Roby (8)	Ty Jerome (6)	Amalie Arena; Limited seating	20–37
58	April 19	@ Washington	L 107–119	Darius Bazley (20)	Bazley, Maledon, Williams (7)	Maledon, Pokuševski (5)	Capital One Arena; 0	20–38
59	April 21	@ Indiana	L 116–122	Darius Bazley (26)	Moses Brown (11)	Théo Maledon (7)	Bankers Life Fieldhouse; 0	20–39
60	April 23	Washington	L 109–129	Bazley, Maledon (20)	Dort, Roby (8)	Théo Maledon (8)	Chesapeake Energy Arena; 0	20–40
61	April 26	@ Philadelphia	L 90–121	Ty Jerome (22)	Brown, Roby (8)	Aleksej Pokuševski (5)	Wells Fargo Center; 4,094	20–41
62	April 27	@ Boston	W 119–115	Luguentz Dort (24)	Darius Bazley (10)	Théo Maledon (5)	TD Garden; 2,298	21–41
63	April 29	New Orleans	L 95–109	Luguentz Dort (17)	Moses Brown (18)	Théo Maledon (4)	Chesapeake Energy Arena; 0	21–42

May: 1–8 (home: 1–4; road: 0–4)

Game	Date	Team	Score	High points	High rebounds	High assists	Location Attendance	Record
64	May 1	Indiana	L 95–152	Moses Brown (16)	Gabriel Deck (5)	Hall, Williams (4)	Chesapeake Energy Arena; 0	21–43
65	May 2	Phoenix	L 120–123	Darius Bazley (19)	Darius Bazley (9)	Ty Jerome (5)	Chesapeake Energy Arena; 0	21–44
66	May 4	Sacramento	L 99–103	Darius Bazley (24)	Moses Brown (17)	Dort, Jerome (4)	Chesapeake Energy Arena; 0	21–45
67	May 6	@ Golden State	L 97–118	Ty Jerome (23)	Moses Brown (8)	Théo Maledon (8)	Chase Center; 3,621	21–46
68	May 8	@ Golden State	L 97–136	Sviatoslav Mykhailiuk (17)	Moses Brown (8)	Kenrich Williams (5)	Chase Center; 4,155	21–47
69	May 9	@ Sacramento	L 98–126	Darius Bazley (18)	Moses Brown (8)	Aleksej Pokuševski (5)	Golden 1 Center; 0	21–48
70	May 11	@ Sacramento	L 106–122	Kenrich Williams (20)	Moses Brown (13)	Hoard, Williams (4)	Golden 1 Center; 0	21–49
71	May 14	Utah	L 93–102	Sviatoslav Mykhailiuk (19)	Aleksej Pokuševski (9)	Tony Bradley, Maledon (3)	Chesapeake Energy Arena; 0	21–50
72	May 16	L. A. Clippers	W 117–112	Aleksej Pokuševski (29)	Moses Brown (18)	Théo Maledon (4)	Chesapeake Energy Arena; 0	22–50

2020–21 season schedule

== Player statistics ==
Legend
GP	Games played	GS	Games started	MPG	Minutes per game
FG%	Field goal percentage	3P%	3-point field goal percentage	FT%	Free throw percentage
RPG	Rebounds per game	APG	Assists per game	SPG	Steals per game
BPG	Blocks per game	PPG	Points per game	**Bold**	Career high

=== Regular season ===
Oklahoma City Thunder statistics
Player	GP	GS	MPG	FG%	3P%	FT%	RPG	APG	SPG	BPG	PPG
Darius Bazley	55	55	31.2	39.6%	29.0%	70.2%	7.2	1.8	0.5	0.5	13.7
Tony Bradley ^{≠}	22	0	18.0	65.6%	0.0%	70.5%	6.1	0.9	0.4	0.8	8.7
Charlie Brown Jr. ^{≠}	9	1	16.9	30.2%	23.8%	90.0%	1.9	1.0	0.4	0.2	4.4
Moses Brown	43	32	21.4	54.5%	-	61.9%	8.9	0.2	0.7	1.1	8.6
Gabriel Deck ^{≠}	10	0	21.2	47.8%	13.3%	81.8%	4.0	2.4	0.8	0.0	8.4
Hamidou Diallo ^{†}	32	5	23.8	48.1%	29.3%	62.9%	5.2	2.4	1.0	0.4	11.9
Luguentz Dort	52	52	29.7	38.7%	34.3%	74.4%	3.6	1.7	0.9	0.4	14.0
Shai Gilgeous-Alexander	35	35	33.7	50.8%	41.8%	80.8%	4.7	5.9	0.8	0.7	23.7
Josh Hall	21	1	16.0	30.3%	10.8%	50.0%	2.8	1.3	0.2	0.0	4.1
George Hill ^{†}	14	14	26.4	50.8%	38.6%	84.0%	2.1	3.1	0.9	0.1	11.8
Jaylen Hoard ^{≠}	19	0	16.8	50.0%	0.0%	68.3%	3.4	1.3	0.7	0.3	6.1
Al Horford	28	28	27.9	45.0%	36.8%	81.8%	6.7	3.4	0.9	0.9	14.2
Justin Jackson ^{‡}	33	3	16.5	40.6%	30.6%	85.7%	2.2	1.5	0.5	0.1	7.2
Ty Jerome	33	1	23.9	44.6%	42.3%	76.5%	2.8	3.6	0.6	0.2	10.7
Théo Maledon	65	49	27.4	36.8%	33.5%	74.8%	3.2	3.5	0.9	0.2	10.1
Darius Miller ^{‡}	18	0	10.9	45.8%	40.5%	100%	1.3	1.2	0.7	0.3	4.1
Mike Muscala	35	0	18.4	44.6%	37.0%	91.7%	3.8	0.8	0.2	0.3	9.7
Svi Mykhailiuk ^{≠}	30	9	23.0	43.8%	33.6%	70.0%	3.0	1.8	0.8	0.2	10.3
Aleksej Pokuševski	48	28	24.2	34.1%	28.0%	73.8%	4.7	2.2	0.4	0.9	8.2
Justin Robinson ^{≠}	9	0	9.8	33.3%	28.6%	60.0%	0.8	1.0	0.3	0.0	2.3
Isaiah Roby	61	34	23.4	48.3%	29.4%	74.4%	5.6	1.8	0.9	0.6	8.7
Kenrich Williams	66	13	21.6	53.3%	44.4%	57.1%	4.1	2.3	0.8	0.3	8.0

Led team in statistic

After all games.
^{‡} Waived during the season
^{†} Traded during the season
^{≠} Acquired during the season

=== Individual game highs ===
Category	Player	Statistic
Points	Shai Gilgeous-Alexander; Luguentz Dort	42 vs Spurs on February 24, 2021; 42 vs Jazz on April 13, 2021
Rebounds	Moses Brown	23 vs Celtics on March 27, 2021
Assists	Théo Maledon	12 vs Hawks on February 26, 2021
Steals	Luguentz Dort; Théo Maledon	6 vs Bulls on January 15, 2021; 6 vs Rockets on February 3, 2021
Blocks	Moses Brown	7 vs Clippers on May 16, 2021
Minutes	Shai Gilgeous-Alexander	43:31 vs Bulls on January 15, 2021

Category	Player	Statistic
Field goals made	Luguentz Dort	16 vs Jazz on April 13, 2021
Threes made	Aleksej Pokuševski; Luguentz Dort	7 vs Hornets on April 7, 2021; 7 vs Jazz on April 13, 2021
Free throws made	Darius Bazley; Luguentz Dort	11 vs Wizards on April 19, 2021; 11 vs Celtics on April 27, 2021
Double-Doubles	Moses Brown	12
Triple-Doubles	N/A	N/A

== Transactions ==
=== Overview ===
Players Added

Via trade

- George Hill
- Al Horford
- Ty Jerome
- Justin Jackson
- Théo Maledon
  (Draft rights)
- Aleksej Pokuševski
  (Draft rights)
- Kenrich Williams

Via free agency

- Moses Brown
- Josh Hall
Players Lost

Via trade

- Steven Adams
- Terrance Ferguson
- Abdel Nader
- Chris Paul
- Dennis Schröder

Via free agency

- Deonte Burton
- Danilo Gallinari
- Devon Hall
- Kevin Hervey
- Nerlens Noel
- Andre Roberson

=== Trades ===
November 16, 2020	To Oklahoma City Thunder Ty Jerome; Jalen Lecque; Kelly Oubre Jr. Ricky Rubio; 2022 first-round pick	To Phoenix Suns Chris Paul; Abdel Nader
November 18, 2020	To Oklahoma City Thunder Danny Green; Draft rights to Jaden McDaniels	To Los Angeles Lakers Dennis Schröder
November 19, 2020	To Oklahoma City Thunder Vincent Poirier	To Boston Celtics Protected 2021-second-round pick
November 19, 2020	To Oklahoma City Thunder Admiral Schofield; Draft rights to Vít Krejčí	To Washington Wizards Draft rights to Cassius Winston; 2024 second-round pick
November 20, 2020	To Oklahoma City Thunder James Johnson via MIN; 2024 second-round pick via MIN; Draft rights to Aleksej Pokuševski via MIN	To Minnesota Timberwolves Ricky Rubio via OKC; 2020 first-round pick via NYK; Draft rights to Jaden McDaniels via OKC
November 20, 2020	To New York Knicks 2023 second-round pick via MIN; Draft rights to Immanuel Quickley via OKC; Draft rights to Mathias Lessort via MIN
November 22, 2020	To Oklahoma City Thunder Protected 2021 first-round pick 2021 second-round pick via DEN	To Golden State Warriors Kelly Oubre Jr.
November 24, 2020	To Oklahoma City Thunder George Hill via MIL; Zylan Cheatham via NOP; Josh Gray via NOP; Darius Miller via NOP; Kenrich Williams via NOP; 2023 protected first-round pick via DEN; 2023 second-round pick via NOP (via WAS); 2024 second-round pick via NOP (via CHA)	To New Orleans Pelicans Steven Adams via OKC; Eric Bledsoe via MIL; 2024 first-round pick via MIL; 2025 first-round pick via MIL; 2026 first-round pick via MIL; 2027 first-round pick via MIL
November 24, 2020	To Denver Nuggets Draft rights to R. J. Hampton via MIL	To Milwaukee Bucks Jrue Holiday via NOP; Draft rights to Sam Merrill via NOP
November 24, 2020	To Oklahoma City Thunder 2025 second-round pick	To Atlanta Hawks Danilo Gallinari; Cash considerations
November 25, 2020	To Oklahoma City Thunder T. J. Leaf; 2027 second-round pick	To Indiana Pacers Jalen Lecque
November 27, 2020	To Oklahoma City Thunder Trevor Ariza via DET; Justin Jackson via DAL; 2023 second-round pick via DAL (best from either DAL or MIA); 2026 second-round pick via DAL	To Dallas Mavericks James Johnson via OKC
November 27, 2020	To Detroit Pistons Delon Wright via DAL
December 8, 2020	To Oklahoma City Thunder Al Horford; 2025 first-round pick Draft rights to Théo Maledon; Draft rights to Vasilije Micić	To Philadelphia 76ers Terrance Ferguson; Danny Green; Vincent Poirier
March 13, 2021	To Oklahoma City Thunder Svi Mykhailiuk; 2027 second-round pick via HOU	To Detroit Pistons Hamidou Diallo
March 17, 2021	To Oklahoma City Thunder Meyers Leonard; 2027 second-round pick	To Miami Heat Trevor Ariza
March 25, 2021	To Oklahoma City Thunder Tony Bradley via PHI; Austin Rivers via NYK; 2025 second-round pick via PHI; 2026 second-round pick via PHI	To Philadelphia 76ers George Hill via OKC; Ignas Brazdeikis via NYK
March 25, 2021	To New York Knicks Terrance Ferguson via PHI; Vincent Poirier via PHI; Draft rights to Emir Preldžić via PHI; 2021 second-round pick via PHI; 2024 second-round pick via PHI

=== Free agency ===
==== Re-signed ====
Date	Player	Contract
In-Season Re-Signings
March 28, 2021	Moses Brown	Multi-Year
May 15, 2021	Charlie Brown Jr.	Multi-Year

a: Moses Brown initially signed a two-way contract before it was converted into a multi-year contract.
b: Charlie Brown Jr. initially signed two 10-day contracts before he signed a multi-year contract.

==== Additions ====
Date	Player	Contract	Former team
December 9, 2020	Moses Brown	Two-Way	Portland Trail Blazers
December 9, 2020	Josh Hall	Two-Way	Moravian Prep (Postgraduate)
In-Season Additions
April 5, 2021	Justin Robinson	10-Day	Delaware Blue Coats (G League)
April 5, 2021	Jaylen Hoard	Two-Way	Oklahoma City Blue (G League)
April 12, 2021	Gabriel Deck	Multi-Year	(Spain) Real Madrid
April 15, 2021	Justin Robinson	Second 10-Day	Oklahoma City Thunder
April 25, 2021	Charlie Brown Jr.	10-Day	Iowa Wolves (G League)
May 5, 2021	Charlie Brown Jr.	Second 10-Day	Oklahoma City Thunder

==== Subtractions ====
Date	Player	Reason left	New team
September 21, 2020	Kevin Hervey	Free agent	(Russia) Lokomotiv Kuban
November 21, 2020	Deonte Burton	Free agent	Maine Celtics (G League)
November 24, 2020	Danilo Gallinari	Free agent	Atlanta Hawks
November 25, 2020	Nerlens Noel	Free agent	New York Knicks
December 1, 2020	Josh Gray	Waived	Fort Wayne Mad Ants (G League)
December 2, 2020	Zylan Cheatham	Waived	Iowa Wolves (G League)
December 18, 2020	T. J. Leaf	Waived	Portland Trail Blazers
December 18, 2020	Admiral Schofield	Waived	Greensboro Swarm (G League)
February 16, 2021	Andre Roberson	Free agent	Brooklyn Nets
In-Season Subtractions
March 25, 2021	Meyers Leonard	Waived	Milwaukee Bucks
March 28, 2021	Austin Rivers	Waived	Denver Nuggets
April 5, 2021	Justin Jackson	Waived	Milwaukee Bucks
April 8, 2021	Darius Miller	Waived	N/A

c: Andre Roberson's contract expired at the end of the 2019-20 season.
