= Josh Hall (basketball) =

American basketball player (born 2000)

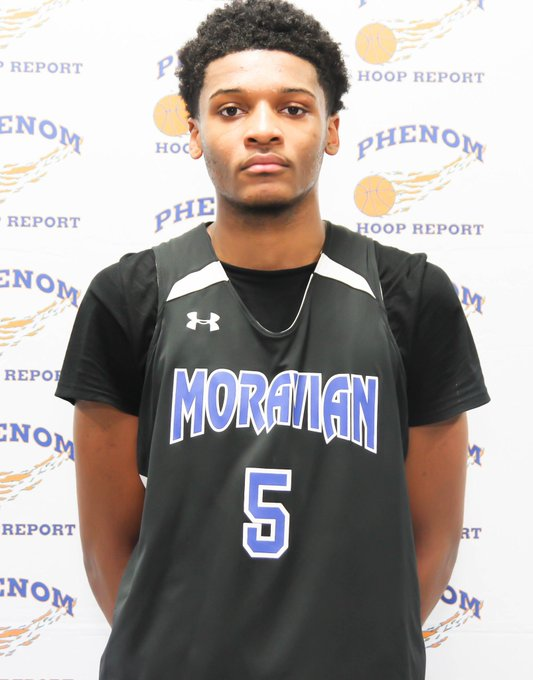
- Hall with Moravian Prep

Personal information
- Born: October 8, 2000 (age 26) Durham, North Carolina, U.S.
- Listed height: 6 ft 9 in (2.06 m)
- Listed weight: 190 lb (86 kg)

Career information
- High school: Southern (Durham, North Carolina); Oak Hill Academy (Mouth of Wilson, Virginia); Moravian Prep (Hudson, North Carolina)
- NBA draft: 2020: undrafted
- Playing career: 2020–2023
- Position: Small forward
- Number: 15

Career history
- 2020–2021: Oklahoma City Thunder
- 2021: →Oklahoma City Blue
- 2021–2022: Maine Celtics
- 2023: Grand Rapids Gold
- 2023: Cape Town Tigers
- Stats at NBA.com
- Stats at Basketball Reference

Joshua Karon Lee Hall (born October 8, 2000) is an American former professional basketball player. He played for Moravian Prep in Hudson, North Carolina at the postgraduate level. A five-star recruit and former NC State commit, Hall chose to forgo college basketball and immediately enter the 2020 NBA draft. He is a 6-foot-9-inch (2.06 m), 190-pound (86 kg) small forward.

== High school career ==
Hall played his freshman season of high school basketball at Southern High School in Durham, North Carolina. For his next two years, he transferred to Oak Hill Academy, playing for its local team rather than its prestigious national team. Hall tried out for the national team during his junior season but did not make the team. Hall played a postgraduate season at Moravian Prep in Hudson, North Carolina, averaging 24 points and 4.4 rebounds per game and leading his team to a 34–3 record. At Moravian, he put on 15 pounds of muscle and emerged as a top player in his high school class. Hall was named the North Carolina Player of the Year by scouting service Phenom Hoops.

=== Recruiting ===
On November 18, 2019, Hall committed to play college basketball for NC State over offers from Louisville and DePaul, among others. By the end of his high school career, he was considered a five-star recruit by Rivals and a four-star recruit by 247Sports and ESPN. On April 6, 2020, Hall declared for the 2020 NBA draft while maintaining his college eligibility. On April 30, he announced that he would remain in the draft and sign an agent, forgoing college basketball.

College recruiting
Name	Hometown	School	Height	Weight	Commit date
Josh Hall; SF	Durham, NC	Moravian Prep (NC)	6 ft 9 in (2.06 m)	190 lb (86 kg)	Nov 18, 2019
Josh Hall; SF	Recruit ratings: Rivals: 247Sports: ESPN: (87)				
Overall recruit ranking: Rivals: 21 247Sports: 31 ESPN: 40
Note: In many cases, Scout, Rivals, 247Sports, On3, and ESPN may conflict in their listings of height and weight.; In these cases, the average was taken. ESPN grades are on a 100-point scale.; Sources: "NC State 2020 Basketball Commitments". Rivals.; "2020 NC State Wolfpack Recruiting Class". ESPN.; "2020 Team Ranking". Rivals.

== Professional career ==
=== Oklahoma City Thunder (2020–2021) ===
After going undrafted in the 2020 NBA draft, Hall signed a two-way contract with the Oklahoma City Thunder On December 9, 2020. On September 12, 2021, Hall was waived by the Thunder.

=== Raptors 905 (2021–2022) ===
Hall was signed to an Exhibit 10 contract by the Toronto Raptors, and was waived to receive a contract to join the Raptors 905.

=== Maine Celtics (2022) ===
On October 24, 2022, Hall joined the Maine Celtics training camp roster. However, he did not make the opening-night roster.

=== Grand Rapids Gold (2023) ===
On February 11, 2023, Hall was acquired by the Grand Rapids Gold. He was later waived on March 3, 2023.

=== Cape Town Tigers (2023) ===
On February 23, 2023, Hall was announced by the Cape Town Tigers of the Basketball Africa League (BAL). He left the Tigers ahead of the playoffs.

== Career statistics ==
Legend
GP	Games played	GS	Games started	MPG	Minutes per game
FG%	Field goal percentage	3P%	3-point field goal percentage	FT%	Free throw percentage
RPG	Rebounds per game	APG	Assists per game	SPG	Steals per game
BPG	Blocks per game	PPG	Points per game	**Bold**	Career high

=== NBA ===
Year	Team	GP	GS	MPG	FG%	3P%	FT%	RPG	APG	SPG	BPG	PPG
2020–21	Oklahoma City	21	1	16.0	.303	.108	.500	2.8	1.3	.2	.0	4.1
Career		21	1	16.0	.303	.108	.500	2.8	1.3	.2	.0	4.1
