= 2023–24 Oklahoma City Thunder season =

- Division champions
- Head coach: Mark Daigneault
- General manager: Sam Presti
- Owners: Professional Basketball Club LLC; Clay Bennett (Chairman)
- Arena: Paycom Center

Results
- Record: 57–25 (.695)
- Place: Division: 1st (Northwest); Conference: 1st (Western)
- Playoff finish: Conference semifinals (lost to Mavericks 2–4)
- Stats at Basketball Reference

Local media
- Television: Bally Sports Oklahoma; Griffin Media (Note: Affiliates include: KSBI (Oklahoma City); KOTV-DT3 (Tulsa); KSWO-DT3 (Lawton); KSCW-DT (Wichita); KOAM-TV/KFJX/KFJX-DT3 (Joplin/Pittsburg)) (8 games)
- Radio: KWPN and WWLS-FM

The 2023–24 Oklahoma City Thunder season was the 16th season of the franchise in Oklahoma City and the 58th in the National Basketball Association (NBA).

After a win over the Rockets on February 27, the Thunder improved on their 40–42 record from the previous year. After a win over the New Orleans Pelicans, the Thunder reached 50 wins for the first time since 2016. On March 31, 2024, the Thunder clinched their first playoff berth since 2020 after a win against the New York Knicks. They eventually clinched their first division title since 2016, along with the top seed in the Western Conference for the first time since 2013, after clinching a tiebreaker over the Denver Nuggets, who also finished with an identical 57–25 record, due to a 3–1 season series win. The Thunder became the youngest team to earn the 1-seed since seeding began in 1984 (with an average age almost two years younger than the previous record holder, the 2004–05 Phoenix Suns).

In the playoffs, the Thunder swept the New Orleans Pelicans, 4–0 in the first round, making them the youngest team ever to win a playoff series, surpassing the 2010–11 Thunder. This would also be their first playoff series win since 2016. However, they were upset by the Dallas Mavericks in six games of the semifinals.

The Oklahoma City Thunder drew an average home attendance of 17,451 in 41 home games in the 2023-24 NBA season.

== Previous season ==
The Thunder finished the 2022–23 season 40–42 to finish third in the Northwest Division, tenth in the Western Conference and qualified for the play-in tournament. The Thunder won its first game against the New Orleans Pelicans but were eliminated against Minnesota Timberwolves in the second game. This marks the third consecutive season that the Thunder failed to qualify for the playoffs since moving to Oklahoma City.

In their third year of the rebuild, the Thunder exceeded their win expectations behind the All-Star play of Shai Gilgeous-Alexander, second-year guard Josh Giddey and rookie Jalen Williams. Gilgeous-Alexander broke out for the Thunder averaging a career-high 31.4 points, becoming one of the league's top scorers and notched his first All-Star selection. Gilgeous-Alexander was later named to the All-NBA First Team for the first time. With Giddey and Williams also breaking out as scorers, the Thunder improved offensively and were fifth in points per game as a team after finishing last in the league last season.

In his rookie season, Jalen Williams—the 12th pick in the 2022 NBA draft—led the team in field goal percentage at 52.1% while averaging 14.1 points, 4.5 rebounds, 3.3 assists and 1.4 steals a game. Williams finished the season winning two Western Conference Rookie of the Month and was named to the All-Rookie First Team.

Finishing tenth place in the Western Conference, the Thunder held the final play-in spot, seeing their first postseason action since the 2019–20 season. Behind Gilgeous-Alexander's 32 points, Giddey's 31 points, 9 rebounds and 10 assists, and Luguentz Dort's 27 points, the Thunder won its first-ever play-in game before being eliminated by the Minnesota Timberwolves with a chance to make the playoffs.

== Offseason ==
=== Draft ===
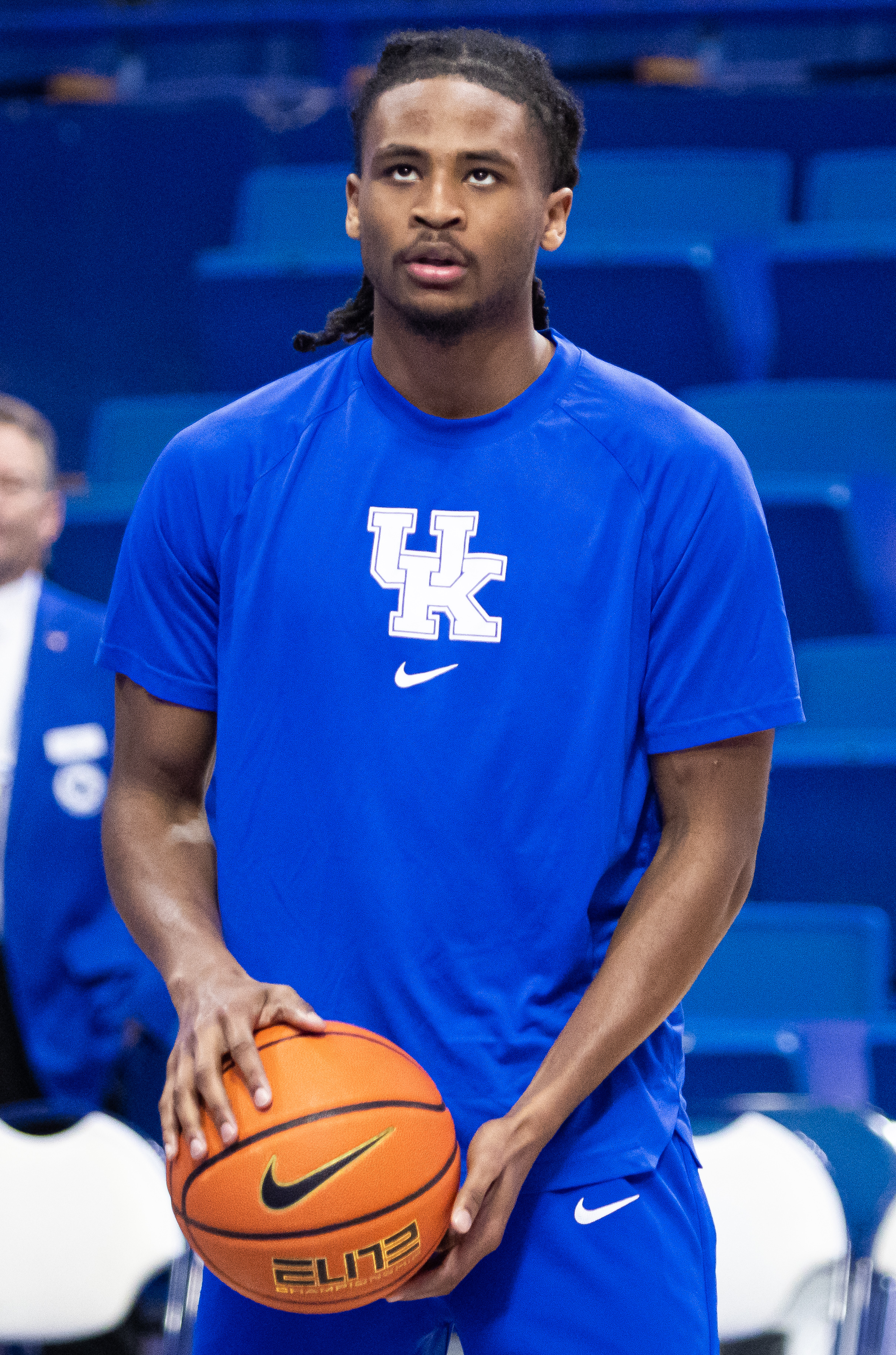
Cason Wallace was selected 10th overall and was later traded to the Oklahoma City Thunder.

Round	Pick	Player	Position	Nationality	College
1	12	Dereck Lively II	C	United States	Duke
2	37	Hunter Tyson	SF	United States	Clemson
2	50	Keyontae Johnson	SG	United States	Kansas State
Cason Wallace was later traded to the Thunder via Dallas Mavericks

The Thunder had one first-round pick and two second-round picks entering the draft. Their sole first-round pick had a 1.7% chance to win the first overall pick and a 8.1% chance to jump in the top four after losing the tiebreaker with the Chicago Bulls for the eleventh best odds. Sam Presti represented the Thunder in the lottery drawing room while Nick Collison represented the Thunder at the draft lottery for the second consecutive year. Since retiring, Collison has served a position within the Thunder's front office, recently being named an amateur evaluation scout. With an 85.2% chance at staying at twelfth, the Thunder ended the night with the 12th overall pick. After the lottery, the order of the Thunder's two second-round picks were revealed. Due to the San Antonio Spurs picking ahead of the Houston Rockets in the draft, the Thunder's second-round pick that would have been conveyed from the Portland Trail Blazers at 35th overall, was instead conveyed to the Boston Celtics. The Thunder instead, acquired the 50th overall pick from the Miami Heat. The Thunder's other second-round pick, originally from the Washington Wizards via New Orleans Pelicans from the Steven Adams trade, landed at 37th overall.

On draft night, the Thunder traded the draft rights to Dereck Lively II, the 12th overall pick, to the Dallas Mavericks in exchange for the draft rights to Cason Wallace, the 10th overall pick, and Dāvis Bertāns. Coming out of Kentucky after his freshman year, Wallace averaged 11.7 points, 3.7 rebounds, 4.3 assists and 2.0 steals—landing him on the SEC All-Freshman Team. Wallace gained recognition for his elite defense, drawing comparisons to Jrue Holiday as a two-way combo guard who can disrupt opposing guards and can offensively make the right play. The Thunder then traded the draft rights to Hunter Tyson, the 37th overall pick, and the least favorable of the Thunder's 2024 first-round picks to the Denver Nuggets in exchange for a future protected 2029 first-round pick. With the 50th pick, the Thunder drafted Keyontae Johnson out of Kansas State. Johnson played his first four years with Florida before collapsing on the court after suffering a heart inflammation. Transferring to Kansas State, Johnson averaged 17.4 points and 6.8 rebounds on 51.4% shooting. Described as a fundamentally sound two-way player, Johnson averaged 38.9% on his 3-point attempts in addition to being effective on defense with opponents shooting 32.6% with Johnson as the primary defender.

The Thunder ended 2023 NBA draft night with Kentucky guard Cason Wallace and Kansas State guard Keyontae Johnson. During the Thunder's 2023 Draft Class Press Conference, general manager Sam Presti confirmed that Johnson will be one of the Thunder's two-way contract players headed into the season, which he later signed on July 7.

=== Free agency ===
For this offseason, free agency began on June 30, 2023, at 6:00 p.m. EST. Dario Šarić was set to hit unrestricted free agency while two-way players Jared Butler and Olivier Sarr were set to hit restricted free agency. In addition, Lindy Waters III had an upcoming team option and Jeremiah Robinson-Earl held a non-guaranteed contract with the team heading into the season. On June 29, the Thunder declined Waters III's team option worth $1.9 million. Waters III started with the Thunder on a two-way contract before being converted into a standard contract. In two seasons, Waters III averaged 6.3 points while shooting 36% from three on 4.7 attempts. However, on August 18, the Thunder re-signed Waters III to a two-way contract after losing Butler in free agency. The Thunder also declined to extend a qualifying offer to Jared Butler and Olivier Sarr, making them both an unrestricted free agent. However, on August 21, the Thunder re-signed Sarr to another two-way contract. On June 30, the Thunder guaranteed Jeremiah Robinson-Earl's contract worth $1.9 million. Since being drafted in 2021, Robinson-Earl averaged 7.2 points and 4.9 rebounds in two seasons with the Thunder.

On July 1, it was reported that Vasilije Micić agreed to a three-year, $23.5 million contract with the Thunder, which he later signed on July 17. The Thunder included a team option on Micić's third year in his contract. Originally drafted in 2014 by the Philadelphia 76ers, Micić's draft rights were traded to the Thunder in 2020 as part of the Al Horford trade. Playing in the EuroLeague, Micić developed as one of the top players, winning back-to-back EuroLeague titles, being named the EuroLeague MVP in 2021, and winning the EuroLeague Final Four MVP twice in 2021 and 2022. In his last season with Anadolu Efes, Micić averaged 16.0 points, 3.2 rebounds, 5.4 assists on 43.5% shooting. On July 1, it was reported that Jack White agreed to a two-year contract with the Thunder, which he later signed on July 20 after the Thunder waived Rudy Gay. White joins the Thunder after winning an NBA championship with the Denver Nuggets in the 2023 NBA Finals. However, on October 22, the Thunder waived White to finalize their regular season roster.

=== Trades ===
On July 6, the Thunder acquired Victor Oladipo, a 2029 second-round pick, and a 2030 second-round pick from the Miami Heat in exchange for cash considerations. The Thunder absorbed Oladipo's $9.45 million expiring contract into cap room while the Heat generated a $9.45 million trade exception. Oladipo, who previously played for the Thunder in the 2016–17 season, suffered a torn patellar tendon in his left knee during the 2023 NBA playoffs and was traded by the Heat for some financial flexibility due to being over the tax threshold for the season. On July 8, the Thunder acquired Patty Mills, a 2024 second-round pick, a 2029 second-round pick, and a 2030 second-round pick from the Houston Rockets as a part of a broader five-team trade, in which the Thunder will send cash considerations to the Atlanta Hawks. The Thunder then re-routed Mills to the Hawks in exchange for Usman Garuba, Rudy Gay and TyTy Washington Jr., and a 2026 second-round pick. Recent first-round picks Garuba and Washington Jr. arrived to the Thunder after being traded by the Houston Rockets to the Hawks as part of the Dillon Brooks five-team trade. However, on August 18, the Thunder waived Washington Jr. The Thunder then waived Garuba three days later on August 21.

On October 17, the Thunder acquired Kevin Porter Jr., a 2027 second-round pick, and a 2028 second-round pick from the Houston Rockets in exchange for Victor Oladipo and Jeremiah Robinson-Earl. However, Porter Jr. was waived after being arrested for his domestic assault charge during the offseason.

=== Front office & coaching changes ===
Following the Washington Wizards' hiring of Michael Winger, Will Dawkins joined the Wizards as the team's general manager. Joining the Thunder in 2008, Dawkins oversaw the Thunder's scouting department for three years before joining the front office. Starting off as an intern, Dawkins served as one of the vice president of basketball operations, sharing the title with Rob Hennigan. Dawkins's promotion marks the fifth assistant under general manager Sam Presti who went onto become a general manager. During the Thunder's 2023 Draft Press Conference, Presti said Hennigan would remain as the only vice president of basketball operations for the season following Dawkins' departure.

On July 19, the Thunder announced that head coach Mark Daigneault signed a multi-year contract extension. Starting off as the head coach for the 2020–21 season, Daigneault had a 16-win improvement in the 2022–23 season where the Thunder ultimately finished with a 40–42 record, including a play-in game victory over the New Orleans Pelicans. Daigneault would later finish second in the 2023 NBA Coach of the Year voting.

=== Injuries ===
During an offseason workout, Aleksej Pokuševski sustained a small right humerus fracture and would be re-evaluated in approximately four to six weeks. Pokuševski missed 38 games including the Thunder's two play-in games last season.

=== Summer Leagues ===
Salt Lake City

The Thunder participated in the 2023 Salt Lake City Summer League alongside the Utah Jazz, Memphis Grizzlies and the Philadelphia 76ers. This marked the second straight year the Thunder participated in the round-robin showcase. On July 1, the Thunder announced their summer league roster for Salt Lake City which notably featured Chet Holmgren, Jalen Williams, Ousmane Dieng, Keyontae Johnson, Tre Mann, Jeremiah Robinson-Earl and Jaylin Williams. Rookie Cason Wallace, who was acquired from the Dallas Mavericks, did not participate due to the trade not being official until July 6.

Schedule

NBA TV

Day 1 – July 3

Box Score

Oklahoma City Thunder 95, Utah Jazz 85
Scoring by quarter: 16–13, 43–30, 23–19, 13–23
Pts: Jal. Williams (21); Rebs: Jay. Williams (13); Asts: Dieng & Jay. Williams (3)	Pts: George (18); Rebs: Agbaji & Hauser (9); Asts: George, Potter & Ross (4)

Delta Center, Salt Lake City, Utah
Referees: Andy Nagy, Dannica Mosher, Jason Stiell

NBA TV

Day 2 – July 5

Box Score

Memphis Grizzlies 94, Oklahoma City Thunder 86
Scoring by quarter: 39–31, 17–23, 19–16, 19–16
Pts: LaRavia (25); Rebs: Williams Jr. (9); Asts: Gilyard (6)	Pts: Mann (28); Rebs: Holmgren (11); Asts: Butler (6)

Delta Center, Salt Lake City, Utah
Referees: Andy Nagy, Dannica Mosher, Robert Hussey

ESPN

Day 3 – July 6

Box Score

Oklahoma City Thunder 100, Philadelphia 76ers 91
Pts: Tre Mann (23); Rebs: Dieng (10); Asts: Mann (5)	Pts: Springer (17); Rebs: Petrušev (8); Asts: Smart (4)

Delta Center, Salt Lake City, Utah
Referees: John Conley, Robert Hussey, Jason Stiell

Las Vegas

The Thunder participated in the 2023 Las Vegas Summer League following a 2–1 record in the Salt Lake City Summer League. Rookie Cason Wallace was eligible to participate after missing Salt Lake City Summer League due to his trade. After being acquired by the Thunder, TyTy Washington Jr. was added to the summer league roster for the final two games.

Schedule

ESPN2

July 8

Box Score

Dallas Mavericks 80, Oklahoma City Thunder 91
Scoring by quarter: 15–18, 27–30, 19–21, 19–22
Pts: Hardy (24); Rebs: Key (8); Asts: Wright IV (4)	Pts: Wallace (20); Rebs: Holmgren (10); Asts: Mann & Butler (5)

Referees: Catherine Chang, Paul Tuomey, JP Primm

NBA TV

July 11

Box Score

Houston Rockets 105, Oklahoma City Thunder 92
Scoring by quarter: 34–31, 28–15, 22–23, 21–23
Pts: Hudgins (26); Rebs: Mayer (10); Asts: Hudgins (7)	Pts: KJ Williams (19) & Johnson (19); Rebs: KJ Williams (13); Asts: Maldonado (5)

Referees: Kevin Fahy, Maripier Malo, Johnny Batista

NBA TV

July 12

Box Score

Oklahoma City Thunder 98, Indiana Pacers 87
Scoring by quarter: 20–13, 30–26, 22–24, 26–24
Pts: Holmgren (25); Rebs: Dieng & Holmgren (9); Asts: Butler (7)	Pts: Walker (20); Rebs: Tshiebwe (11); Asts: Wong (4)

Referees: Intae Hwang, Rachael Rayford, Kastine Evans

NBA TV

July 14

Box Score

Oklahoma City Thunder 89, Washington Wizards 105
Scoring by quarter: 20–28, 22–20, 28–30, 19–27
Pts: Butler (22); Rebs: Maldonado & KJ Williams (7); Asts: Dieng (5)	Pts: Davis (22); Rebs: Baldwin (9); Asts: Rollins (7)

Referees: Biniam Maru, Erik Aellig, Rachael Rayford

NBA TV

July 16

Box Score

Oklahoma City Thunder 94, San Antonio Spurs 98
Scoring by quarter: 17–29, 25–24, 29–27, 23–18
Pts: Butler (31); Rebs: Sueing (6); Asts: Dieng (6)	Pts: E. Stevenson (23); Rebs: Bediako (11); Asts: Cissoko (6)

Referees: Ian McClenny, Leah Lanie, Gerda Gatling

== Season synopsis ==
=== Preseason ===
The Thunder announced their preseason schedule on August 4. The Thunder played five games, with three games in Oklahoma and one international game in Montreal. The Thunder opened their preseason opener against the San Antonio Spurs on October 9. Making his preseason debut after missing the 2022–23 season, Chet Holmgren faced off against Victor Wembanyama, the 1st overall pick in the 2023 NBA draft. With Shai Gilgeous-Alexander sitting, Holmgren led the Thunder with 21 points and 9 rebounds with in a 122–121 win. As part of the NBA Canada Series, the Thunder faced off in their first of two meetings against the Detroit Pistons. The Thunder led by as many as 21 points before falling to the Pistons in a 128–125 loss with Luguentz Dort scoring 24 points in his homecoming in Montreal. The Thunder ended preseason with a 2–3 record, with wins against the Spurs and the Milwaukee Bucks.

=== Regular season ===
==== October ====
The Thunder began their 16th season since the franchise moved to Oklahoma City against the Chicago Bulls on October 25. Shai Gilgeous-Alexander led the Thunder with 31 points and 10 assists in a 124–104 win. Late in the third quarter, Gilgeous-Alexander keyed a 12–0 run that broke open a Thunder run headed into the fourth. Jalen Williams and Josh Giddey each added 16 points while Chet Holmgren had 11 points in his professional debut. Against the Cleveland Cavaliers on October 27, the Thunder trailed 102–93 with 1:56 left late in the 4th quarter before three straight 3-pointers. Behind Gilgeous-Alexander's 34 points and Holmgren's 16 points, 13 rebounds, and 7 blocks, the Thunder rallied on a 15–3 run to stun the Cavaliers in a 108–105 win.

==== January ====
On January 25, Shai Gilgeous-Alexander was named a 2024 NBA All-Star starter for the first time, with this being his second consecutive season being named an All-Star. In 43 games, Gilgeous-Alexander averaged 31.1 points, 5.6 rebounds, 6.4 assists, and 2.2 steals in 34.3 minutes per game, leading the Thunder to a 31–13 record, which tied for best in the west. Gilgeous-Alexander has scored 30-plus points in 32 games this season, which was most in the league. Gilgeous-Alexander joins Kevin Durant, Russell Westbrook, and Paul George as the fourth different Thunder player to be named an All-Star starter.

==== February ====
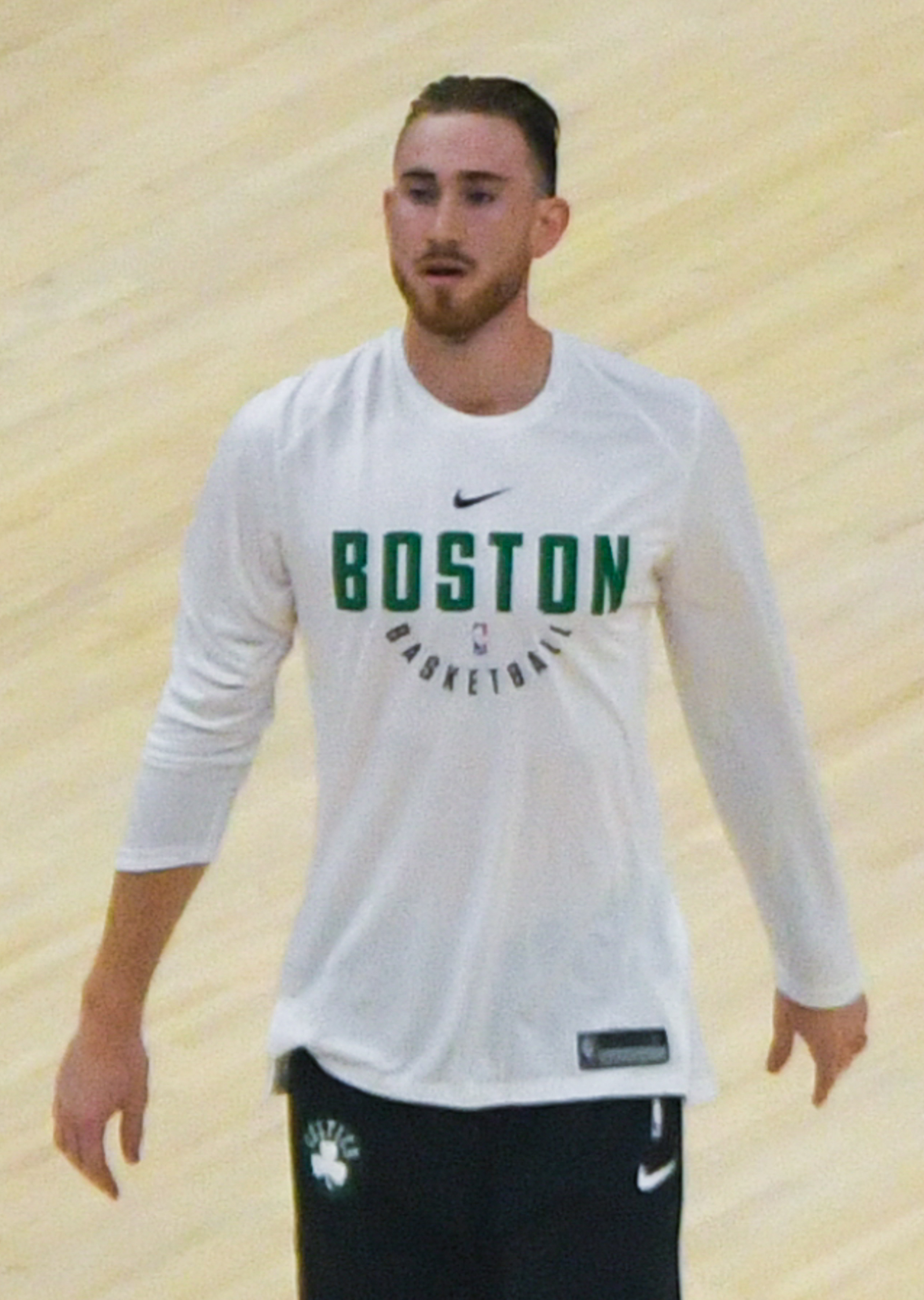
Gordon Hayward was traded to the Thunder.

At the trade deadline, the Thunder completed two trades with the Charlotte Hornets and the Dallas Mavericks. The Thunder traded Dāvis Bertāns, Tre Mann, Vasilije Micić, two second-round picks, and cash considerations to the Hornets in exchange for Gordon Hayward. Coming over from the Mavericks in the offseason, Bertāns appeared in 15 games for the Thunder and averaged 2.9 points in 6.1 minutes per game. Mann, who was originally selected 18th overall in the 2021 NBA draft, appeared in 140 games for the Thunder and averaged 8.5 points in 19.1 minutes. Mann gradually saw his role diminished during the 2022–23 season with the emergence of Isaiah Joe and Aaron Wiggins. Micić appeared in 30 games for the Thunder after coming overseas and averaged 3.3 points and 2.5 assists in 12.0 minutes. The Thunder also traded their 2024 second-least favorable first-round pick to the Mavericks in exchange for a 2028 first-round pick swap. After trading for Hayward, the Thunder opened up two roster spots. The Thunder converted Lindy Waters III's two-way contract to a standard contract. Waters III, who originally was on a standard contract before being waived to a two-way, appeared in 21 games for the Thunder and averaged 2.8 points while shooting 41.9% from three. To fill in the open two-way slot, the Thunder signed Adam Flagler who spent the 2023–24 season with the Oklahoma City Blue after going undrafted in the 2023 NBA draft. The Thunder also signed Bismack Biyombo to fill in the last standard roster spot. Biyombo appeared in 30 games for the Memphis Grizzlies and averaged 5.2 points, 6.5 rebounds, and 1.1 blocks in 23.9 minutes.

Coming off a 35-point loss against the Dallas Mavericks, Shai Gilgeous-Alexander had 38 points, Jalen Williams scored 32 points as the Thunder defeated the Sacramento Kings in a 127–113 win, their first win against the Kings since the 2021–22 season. Gilgeous-Alexander made 15 of 26 shots while Williams made 13 of 20 shots with 8 rebounds and 7 assists. At 2024 NBA All-Star Weekend, Chet Holmgren and Jalen Williams were both selected for Team Jalen while Cason Wallace was selected for Team Pau. On February 23, the Thunder waived Aleksej Pokuševski after four seasons. Drafted 17th in the 2020 NBA draft, Pokuševski appeared in 150 games for the Thunder and averaged 7.5 points, 4.7 rebounds, and 2.0 assists in 20.6 minutes. Pokuševski enjoyed his best year during the 2022–23 season, averaging 8.1 points and 1.3 blocks while shooting a career-high 43.4% from the field and 36.5% from three in 34 appearances.

==== March ====
After waiving Pokuševski, the Thunder signed Mike Muscala to the last roster spot after being bought out by the Detroit Pistons. Muscala returns to the Thunder after spending four seasons, averaging 7.0 points on 39.2% from three in 14.5 minutes.

== Roster ==
2023–24 Oklahoma City Thunder roster
Players

Pos.	No.	Player	Height	Weight	DOB	From
C	15	Bismack Biyombo	6 ft 8 in (2.03 m)	255 lb (116 kg)	1992-08-28	DR Congo
F	13	Ousmane Dieng	6 ft 10 in (2.08 m)	205 lb (93 kg)	2003-05-21	France
G/F	5	Luguentz Dort	6 ft 4 in (1.93 m)	215 lb (98 kg)	1999-04-19	Arizona State
G	14	Adam Flagler (TW)	6 ft 3 in (1.91 m)	180 lb (82 kg)	1999-12-01	Baylor
G	3	Josh Giddey	6 ft 8 in (2.03 m)	205 lb (93 kg)	2002-10-10	Australia
G	2	Shai Gilgeous-Alexander	6 ft 6 in (1.98 m)	180 lb (82 kg)	1998-07-12	Kentucky
F	33	Gordon Hayward	6 ft 7 in (2.01 m)	225 lb (102 kg)	1990-03-23	Butler
F/C	7	Chet Holmgren	7 ft 1 in (2.16 m)	208 lb (94 kg)	2002-05-01	Gonzaga
G	11	Isaiah Joe	6 ft 4 in (1.93 m)	165 lb (75 kg)	1999-07-02	Arkansas
G	18	Keyontae Johnson (TW)	6 ft 5 in (1.96 m)	238 lb (108 kg)	2000-05-24	Kansas State
F	50	Mike Muscala	6 ft 11 in (2.11 m)	240 lb (109 kg)	1991-07-01	Bucknell
C	30	Olivier Sarr (TW)	7 ft 0 in (2.13 m)	240 lb (109 kg)	1999-02-20	Kentucky
G	22	Cason Wallace	6 ft 4 in (1.93 m)	193 lb (88 kg)	2003-11-07	Kentucky
G/F	12	Lindy III Waters	6 ft 6 in (1.98 m)	215 lb (98 kg)	1997-07-28	Oklahoma State
G	21	Aaron Wiggins	6 ft 6 in (1.98 m)	200 lb (91 kg)	1999-01-02	Maryland
G/F	8	Jalen Williams	6 ft 6 in (1.98 m)	211 lb (96 kg)	2001-04-14	Santa Clara
F/C	6	Jaylin Williams	6 ft 10 in (2.08 m)	240 lb (109 kg)	2002-06-29	Arkansas
G/F	34	Kenrich Williams	6 ft 6 in (1.98 m)	210 lb (95 kg)	1994-12-02	TCU

Coaches
Head coach
- Mark Daigneault
Assistant(s)
- David Akinyooye
- Dave Bliss
- Chip Engelland
- Grant Gibbs
- Connor Johnson
- Eric Maynor
- Mike Wilks

Legend
- (DP) Unsigned draft pick
- (FA) Free agent
- (S) Suspended
- (GL) On assignment to G League affiliate
- (TW) Two-way affiliate player
- Injured

Roster
Updated: April 16, 2024

== Salaries ==
Unrestricted free agent	Restricted free agent	■ Team option	■ Player option	(TW) Two-way affiliate player	‡ Waived with guaranteed money

Player	Salary					
Player	2023–24	2024–25	2025–26	2026–27	2027–28	2028–29
Shai Gilgeous-Alexander	$33,386,850	$35,859,950	$38,333,050	$40,806,150	UFA	
Gordon Hayward	$31,500,000	UFA				
Luguentz Dort	$15,277,778	$16,500,000	$17,722,222	$17,722,222	UFA	
Chet Holmgren	$10,386,000	$10,880,640	$13,731,368	RFA		
Josh Giddey	$6,587,040	$8,352,367	RFA			
Kenrich Williams	$6,175,000	$6,669,000	$7,163,000	$7,163,000	UFA	
Cason Wallace	$5,291,400	$5,555,880	$5,820,240	$7,420,806	RFA	
Ousmane Dieng	$4,798,440	$5,027,040	$6,670,882	RFA		
Jalen Williams	$4,558,680	$4,775,760	$6,580,997	RFA		
Jaylin Williams	$2,000,000	$2,019,699	$2,187,699	UFA		
Isaiah Joe	$1,997,238	$2,164,993	UFA			
Aaron Wiggins	$1,836,096	$1,988,598	UFA			
Bismack Biyombo	$1,194,075	UFA				
Mike Muscala	$808,297	UFA				
Lindy Waters III	$766,095	$2,196,970	UFA			
Adam Flagler (TW)	Two-Way	RFA				
Keyontae Johnson (TW)	Two-Way	RFA				
Olivier Sarr (TW)	Two-Way	RFA				
Dead Cap
Kevin Porter Jr. ‡	$15,860,000	$1,000,000				
Rudy Gay ‡	$6,479,000					
Aleksej Pokuševski ‡	$5,009,633					
Usman Garuba ‡	$2,588,400					
TyTy Washington Jr. ‡	$2,320,440					
Jack White ‡	$600,000					

Source: Spotrac

== Standings ==
=== Division ===
Northwest Division	W	L	PCT	GB	Home	Road	Div	GP
c – Oklahoma City Thunder	57	25	.695	–	33‍–‍8	24‍–‍17	12‍–‍4	82
x – Denver Nuggets	57	25	.695	–	33‍–‍8	24‍–‍17	10‍–‍6	82
x – Minnesota Timberwolves	56	26	.683	1.0	30‍–‍11	26‍–‍15	12‍–‍4	82
Utah Jazz	31	51	.378	26.0	21‍–‍20	10‍–‍31	5‍–‍11	82
Portland Trail Blazers	21	61	.256	36.0	11‍–‍30	10‍–‍31	1‍–‍15	82

=== Conference ===
Western Conference
#	Team	W	L	PCT	GB	GP
1	c – Oklahoma City Thunder *	57	25	.695	–	82
2	x – Denver Nuggets	57	25	.695	–	82
3	x – Minnesota Timberwolves	56	26	.683	1.0	82
4	y – Los Angeles Clippers *	51	31	.622	6.0	82
5	y – Dallas Mavericks *	50	32	.610	7.0	82
6	x – Phoenix Suns	49	33	.598	8.0	82
7	x – New Orleans Pelicans	49	33	.598	8.0	82
8	x – Los Angeles Lakers	47	35	.573	10.0	82
9	pi – Sacramento Kings	46	36	.561	11.0	82
10	pi – Golden State Warriors	46	36	.561	11.0	82
11	Houston Rockets	41	41	.500	16.0	82
12	Utah Jazz	31	51	.378	26.0	82
13	Memphis Grizzlies	27	55	.329	30.0	82
14	San Antonio Spurs	22	60	.268	35.0	82
15	Portland Trail Blazers	21	61	.256	36.0	82

== Game log ==
=== Preseason ===
2023 preseason game log
Total: 2–3 (Home: 2–2; Road: 0–1)
Preseason: 2–3 (home: 2–2; road: 0–1)

Game	Date	Team	Score	High points	High rebounds	High assists	Location Attendance	Record
1	October 9	San Antonio	W 122–121	Chet Holmgren (21)	Dieng, Holmgren (9)	Josh Giddey (5)	Paycom Center	1–0
2	October 12	Detroit	L 125–128	Luguentz Dort (24)	Josh Giddey (7)	Kenrich Williams (5)	(Canada) Bell Centre; 21,055	1–1
3	October 15	@ Charlotte	L 115–117	Mann, Jay. Williams (18)	Jaylin Williams (9)	Vasilije Micić (8)	Spectrum Center; 10,553	1–2
4	October 17	Milwaukee	W 124–101	Josh Giddey (19)	Giddey, Sarr (7)	Vasilije Micić (7)	Paycom Center	2–2
5	October 19	Detroit	L 116–118	Jalen Williams (20)	Josh Giddey (7)	Josh Giddey (7)	BOK Center; 12,275	2–3

2023–24 preseason schedule

=== Regular season ===
2023–24 game log
Total: 57–25 (Home: 33–8; Road: 24–17)
October: 3–1 (home: 1–1; road: 2–0)

Game	Date	Team	Score	High points	High rebounds	High assists	Location Attendance	Record
1	October 25	@ Chicago	W 124–104	Shai Gilgeous-Alexander (31)	Luguentz Dort (7)	Shai Gilgeous-Alexander (10)	United Center; 21,369	1–0
2	October 27	@ Cleveland	W 108–105	Shai Gilgeous-Alexander (35)	Chet Holmgren (13)	Josh Giddey (6)	Rocket Mortgage FieldHouse; 19,432	2–0
3	October 29	Denver	L 95–128	Chet Holmgren (19)	Ousmane Dieng (5)	Shai Gilgeous-Alexander (7)	Paycom Center; 18,203	2–1
4	October 30	Detroit	W 124–112	Shai Gilgeous-Alexander (32)	Gilgeous-Alexander, Sarr (9)	Jalen Williams (6)	Paycom Center; 16,127	3–1

November: 9–5 (home: 5–3; road: 4–2)

Game	Date	Team	Score	High points	High rebounds	High assists	Location Attendance	Record
5	November 1	New Orleans	L 106–110	Shai Gilgeous-Alexander (20)	Chet Holmgren (11)	Shai Gilgeous-Alexander (8)	Paycom Center; 15,764	3–2
6	November 3	Golden State	L 139–141	Luguentz Dort (29)	Chet Holmgren (8)	Jalen Williams (8)	Paycom Center; 16,827	3–3
7	November 6	Atlanta	W 126–117	Shai Gilgeous-Alexander (30)	Chet Holmgren (12)	Shai Gilgeous-Alexander (6)	Paycom Center; 16,486	4–3
8	November 8	Cleveland	W 128–120	Shai Gilgeous-Alexander (43)	Gilgeous-Alexander, Holmgren (7)	Giddey, Gilgeous-Alexander (6)	Paycom Center; 16,314	5–3
9	November 10	@ Sacramento	L 98–105	Shai Gilgeous-Alexander (33)	Gilgeous-Alexander, Holmgren (7)	Shai Gilgeous-Alexander (6)	Golden 1 Center; 18,097	5–4
10	November 12	@ Phoenix	W 111–99	Shai Gilgeous-Alexander (35)	Shai Gilgeous-Alexander (7)	Josh Giddey (10)	Footprint Center; 17,071	6–4
11	November 14	San Antonio	W 123–87	Shai Gilgeous-Alexander (28)	Giddey, Holmgren (7)	Josh Giddey (7)	Paycom Center; 18,203	7–4
12	November 16	@ Golden State	W 128–109	Shai Gilgeous-Alexander (24)	Chet Holmgren (10)	Gilgeous-Alexander, Micić (7)	Chase Center; 18,064	8–4
13	November 18	@ Golden State	W 130–123 (OT)	Shai Gilgeous-Alexander (40)	Chet Holmgren (10)	Shai Gilgeous-Alexander (6)	Chase Center; 18,064	9–4
14	November 19	@ Portland	W 134–91	Shai Gilgeous-Alexander (28)	Jaylin Williams (7)	Josh Giddey (5)	Moda Center; 18,235	10–4
15	November 22	Chicago	W 116–102	Shai Gilgeous-Alexander (40)	Chet Holmgren (13)	Shai Gilgeous-Alexander (12)	Paycom Center; 18,203	11–4
16	November 25	Philadelphia	L 123–127	Chet Holmgren (33)	Josh Giddey (7)	Josh Giddey (8)	Paycom Center; 17,125	11–5
17	November 28	@ Minnesota	L 103–106	Shai Gilgeous-Alexander (32)	Chet Holmgren (8)	Chet Holmgren (6)	Target Center; 18,024	11–6
18	November 30	L.A. Lakers	W 133–110	Shai Gilgeous-Alexander (33)	Josh Giddey (8)	Gilgeous-Alexander, Jal. Williams (7)	Paycom Center; 17,401	12–6

December: 10–3 (home: 7–1; road: 3–2)

Game	Date	Team	Score	High points	High rebounds	High assists	Location Attendance	Record
19	December 2	@ Dallas	W 126–120	Jalen Williams (23)	Chet Holmgren (11)	Shai Gilgeous-Alexander (9)	American Airlines Center; 20,277	13–6
20	December 6	@ Houston	L 101–110	Shai Gilgeous-Alexander (33)	Holmgren, Jal. Williams (5)	Giddey, Gilgeous-Alexander (6)	Toyota Center; 16,291	13–7
21	December 8	Golden State	W 138–136 (OT)	Shai Gilgeous-Alexander (38)	Josh Giddey (9)	Shai Gilgeous-Alexander (5)	Paycom Center; 17,112	14–7
22	December 11	Utah	W 134–120	Shai Gilgeous-Alexander (30)	Josh Giddey (10)	Josh Giddey (8)	Paycom Center; 16,631	15–7
23	December 14	@ Sacramento	L 123–128	Shai Gilgeous-Alexander (43)	Chet Holmgren (11)	Shai Gilgeous-Alexander (9)	Golden 1 Center; 17,794	15–8
24	December 16	@ Denver	W 118–117	Shai Gilgeous-Alexander (25)	Chet Holmgren (11)	Chet Holmgren (8)	Ball Arena; 19,611	16–8
25	December 18	Memphis	W 116–97	Shai Gilgeous-Alexander (30)	Josh Giddey (12)	Gilgeous-Alexander, Jal. Williams (5)	Paycom Center; 16,409	17–8
26	December 21	L.A. Clippers	W 134–115	Shai Gilgeous-Alexander (31)	Shai Gilgeous-Alexander (8)	Holmgren, Jal. Williams (7)	Paycom Center; 18,203	18–8
27	December 23	L.A. Lakers	L 120–129	Shai Gilgeous-Alexander (34)	Chet Holmgren (10)	Shai Gilgeous-Alexander (7)	Paycom Center; 18,203	18–9
28	December 26	Minnesota	W 129–106	Shai Gilgeous- Alexander (34)	Shai Gilgeous-Alexander (6)	Shai Gilgeous-Alexander (9)	Paycom Center; 18,203	19–9
29	December 27	New York	W 129–120	Gilgeous-Alexander, Jal. Williams (36)	Shai Gilgeous-Alexander (7)	Shai Gilgeous-Alexander (8)	Paycom Center; 18,203	20–9
30	December 29	@ Denver	W 119–93	Shai Gilgeous-Alexander (40)	Giddey, Jay. Williams (8)	Jalen Williams (9)	Ball Arena; 19,808	21–9
31	December 31	Brooklyn	W 122–108	Shai Gilgeous-Alexander (24)	Chet Holmgren (10)	Shai Gilgeous-Alexander (6)	Paycom Center; 18,203	22–9

January: 11–6 (home: 5–1; road: 6–5)

Game	Date	Team	Score	High points	High rebounds	High assists	Location Attendance	Record
32	January 2	Boston	W 127–123	Shai Gilgeous-Alexander (36)	Dort, Giddey (8)	Gilgeous-Alexander, Holmgren (7)	Paycom Center; 18,203	23–9
33	January 3	@ Atlanta	L 138–141	Shai Gilgeous-Alexander (33)	Shai Gilgeous-Alexander (13)	Shai Gilgeous-Alexander (8)	State Farm Arena; 17,770	23–10
34	January 5	@ Brooklyn	L 115–124	Shai Gilgeous-Alexander (34)	Shai Gilgeous-Alexander (9)	Shai Gilgeous-Alexander (6)	Barclays Center; 18,147	23–11
35	January 8	@ Washington	W 136–128	Shai Gilgeous-Alexander (32)	Jalen Williams (7)	Jalen Williams (10)	Capital One Arena; 15,297	24–11
36	January 10	@ Miami	W 128–120	Shai Gilgeous-Alexander (28)	Holmgren, Jal. Williams (9)	Jalen Williams (12)	Kaseya Center; 19,636	25–11
37	January 11	Portland	W 139–77	Shai Gilgeous-Alexander (31)	Josh Giddey (10)	Josh Giddey (12)	Paycom Center; 15,828	26–11
38	January 13	Orlando	W 112–100	Shai Gilgeous-Alexander (37)	Giddey, Holmgren (8)	Shai Gilgeous-Alexander (7)	Paycom Center; 18,203	27–11
39	January 15	@ L.A. Lakers	L 105–112	Jalen Williams (25)	Chet Holmgren (8)	Gilgeous-Alexander, Jal. Williams (6)	Crypto.com Arena; 18,997	27–12
40	January 16	@ L.A. Clippers	L 117–128	Jalen Williams (25)	Joe, K. Williams (6)	Jalen Williams (7)	Crypto.com Arena; 19,370	27–13
41	January 18	@ Utah	W 134–129	Shai Gilgeous-Alexander (31)	Josh Giddey (10)	Jalen Williams (8)	Delta Center; 18,206	28–13
42	January 20	@ Minnesota	W 102–97	Shai Gilgeous-Alexander (33)	Josh Giddey (8)	Shai Gilgeous-Alexander (6)	Target Center; 18,024	29–13
43	January 23	Portland	W 111–109	Shai Gilgeous-Alexander (33)	Chet Holmgren (10)	Shai Gilgeous-Alexander (10)	Paycom Center; 15,874	30–13
44	January 24	@ San Antonio	W 140–114	Shai Gilgeous-Alexander (32)	Chet Holmgren (9)	Shai Gilgeous-Alexander (10)	Frost Bank Center; 18,130	31–13
45	January 26	@ New Orleans	W 107–83	Shai Gilgeous-Alexander (31)	Chet Holmgren (13)	Jalen Williams (7)	Smoothie King Center; 18,624	32–13
46	January 28	@ Detroit	L 104–120	Shai Gilgeous-Alexander (31)	Chet Holmgren (12)	Josh Giddey (5)	Little Caesars Arena; 16,861	32–14
47	January 29	Minnesota	L 101–107	Shai Gilgeous-Alexander (37)	Gilgeous-Alexander, Holmgren (7)	Shai Gilgeous-Alexander (8)	Paycom Center; 16,870	32–15
48	January 31	Denver	W 105–100	Shai Gilgeous-Alexander (34)	Chet Holmgren (13)	Giddey, Gilgeous-Alexander, Micić (5)	Paycom Center; 16,723	33–15

February: 8–3 (home: 6–0; road: 2–3)

Game	Date	Team	Score	High points	High rebounds	High assists	Location Attendance	Record
49	February 2	Charlotte	W 126–106	Shai Gilgeous-Alexander (31)	Jaylin Williams (8)	Shai Gilgeous-Alexander (9)	Paycom Center; 17,552	34–15
50	February 4	Toronto	W 135–127 (2OT)	Shai Gilgeous-Alexander (23)	Shai Gilgeous-Alexander (9)	Shai Gilgeous-Alexander (14)	Paycom Center; 17,059	35–15
51	February 6	@ Utah	L 117–124	Shai Gilgeous-Alexander (28)	Chet Holmgren (8)	Shai Gilgeous-Alexander (7)	Delta Center; 18,206	35–16
52	February 10	@ Dallas	L 111–146	Shai Gilgeous-Alexander (25)	Chet Holmgren (12)	Jalen Williams (7)	American Airlines Center; 20,277	35–17
53	February 11	Sacramento	W 127–113	Shai Gilgeous-Alexander (38)	Luguentz Dort (9)	Jalen Williams (9)	Paycom Center; 17,092	36–17
54	February 13	@ Orlando	W 127–113	Jalen Williams (33)	Chet Holmgren (9)	Giddey, Gilgeous-Alexander (5)	Kia Center; 19,301	37–17
All-Star Game
55	February 22	L.A. Clippers	W 129–107	Shai Gilgeous-Alexander (31)	Chet Holmgren (10)	Shai Gilgeous-Alexander (8)	Paycom Center; 18,203	38–17
56	February 23	Washington	W 147–106	Shai Gilgeous-Alexander (30)	Chet Holmgren (10)	Shai Gilgeous-Alexander (9)	Paycom Center; 18,203	39–17
57	February 25	@ Houston	W 123–110	Shai Gilgeous-Alexander (36)	Josh Giddey (9)	Gilgeous-Alexander, Holmgren (7)	Toyota Center; 18,055	40–17
58	February 27	Houston	W 112–95	Shai Gilgeous-Alexander (31)	Chet Holmgren (13)	Jalen Williams (5)	Paycom Center; 17,164	41–17
59	February 29	@ San Antonio	L 118–132	Shai Gilgeous-Alexander (31)	Chet Holmgren (7)	Chet Holmgren (5)	Frost Bank Center; 18,392	41–18

March: 11–4 (home: 5–2; road: 6–2)

Game	Date	Team	Score	High points	High rebounds	High assists	Location Attendance	Record
60	March 3	@ Phoenix	W 118–110	Shai Gilgeous-Alexander (35)	Chet Holmgren (9)	Shai Gilgeous-Alexander (9)	Footprint Center; 17,071	42–18
61	March 4	@ L.A. Lakers	L 104–116	Shai Gilgeous-Alexander (20)	Gilegeous-Alexander, Holmgren (7)	Giddey, Gilegeous-Alexander (4)	Crypto.com Arena; 18,997	42–19
62	March 6	@ Portland	W 129–120	Shai Gilgeous-Alexander (37)	Chet Holmgren (14)	Josh Giddey (7)	Moda Center; 17,589	43–19
63	March 8	Miami	W 107–100	Shai Gilgeous-Alexander (37)	Josh Giddey (9)	Giddey, Gilgeous-Alexander (6)	Paycom Center; 18,203	44–19
64	March 10	Memphis	W 124–93	Shai Gilgeous-Alexander (23)	Josh Giddey (10)	Gilgeous-Alexander, Hayward (6)	Paycom Center; 18,203	45–19
65	March 12	Indiana	L 111–121	Shai Gilgeous-Alexander (30)	Chet Holmgren (13)	Gilgeous-Alexander, Hayward (5)	Paycom Center; 17,118	45–20
66	March 14	Dallas	W 126–119	Shai Gilgeous-Alexander (31)	Shai Gilgeous-Alexander (9)	Gilgeous-Alexander, Giddey, Jal. Williams (5)	Paycom Center; 18,203	46–20
67	March 16	@ Memphis	W 118–112	Jalen Williams (23)	Chet Holmgren (11)	Jalen Williams (6)	FedExForum; 17,012	47–20
68	March 20	Utah	W 119–107	Chet Holmgren (35)	Chet Holmgren (14)	Josh Giddey (8)	Paycom Center; 18,203	48–20
69	March 22	@ Toronto	W 123–103	Shai Gilgeous-Alexander (23)	Chet Holmgren (10)	Shai Gilgeous-Alexander (8)	Scotiabank Arena; 19,601	49–20
70	March 24	@ Milwaukee	L 93–118	Josh Giddey (19)	Josh Giddey (9)	Josh Giddey (8)	Fiserv Forum; 17,877	49–21
71	March 26	@ New Orleans	W 119–112	Jalen Williams (26)	Giddey, Holmgren (9)	Shai Gilgeous-Alexander (8)	Smoothie King Center; 17,436	50–21
72	March 27	Houston	L 126–132 (OT)	Josh Giddey (31)	Kenrich Williams (9)	Jalen Williams (10)	Paycom Center; 17,438	50–22
73	March 29	Phoenix	W 128–103	Josh Giddey (23)	Josh Giddey (7)	Josh Giddey (9)	Paycom Center; 18,203	51–22
74	March 31	@ New York	W 113–112	Jalen Williams (33)	Josh Giddey (13)	Josh Giddey (12)	Madison Square Garden; 19,812	52–22

April : 5–3 (home: 4–0; road: 1–3)

Game	Date	Team	Score	High points	High rebounds	High assists	Location Attendance	Record
75	April 2	@ Philadelphia	L 105–109	Chet Holmgren (22)	Luguentz Dort (8)	Jaylin Williams (12)	Wells Fargo Center; 20,733	52–23
76	April 3	@ Boston	L 100–135	Josh Giddey (17)	Chet Holmgren (7)	Wallace, Wiggins (5)	TD Garden; 19,156	52–24
77	April 5	@ Indiana	L 112–126	Luguentz Dort (22)	Josh Giddey (9)	Josh Giddey (12)	Gainbridge Fieldhouse; 17,274	52–25
78	April 7	@ Charlotte	W 121–118	Aaron Wiggins (26)	Josh Giddey (13)	Josh Giddey (13)	Spectrum Center; 16,556	53–25
79	April 9	Sacramento	W 112–105	Shai Gilgeous-Alexander (40)	Chet Holmgren (9)	Gilgeous-Alexander, Jal. Williams (4)	Paycom Center; 17,509	54–25
80	April 10	San Antonio	W 127–89	Shai Gilgeous-Alexander (26)	Josh Giddey (12)	Josh Giddey (7)	Paycom Center; 17,229	55–25
81	April 12	Milwaukee	W 125–107	Shai Gilgeous-Alexander (23)	Chet Holmgren (9)	Jalen Williams (5)	Paycom Center; 18,203	56–25
82	April 14	Dallas	W 135–86	Shai Gilgeous-Alexander (15)	Chet Holmgren (9)	Josh Giddey (8)	Paycom Center; 18,203	57–25

2023–24 season schedule

=== Playoffs ===
2024 playoff game log
Total: 6–4 (home: 3–2; road: 3–2)
First Round: 4–0 (home: 2–0; road: 2–0)

Game	Date	Team	Score	High points	High rebounds	High assists	Location Attendance	Series
1	April 21	New Orleans	W 94–92	Shai Gilgeous-Alexander (28)	Chet Holmgren (11)	Gilgeous-Alexander, Jal. Williams (4)	Paycom Center; 18,203	1–0
2	April 24	New Orleans	W 124–92	Shai Gilgeous-Alexander (33)	Chet Holmgren (7)	Jalen Williams (7)	Paycom Center; 18,203	2–0
3	April 27	@ New Orleans	W 106–85	Shai Gilgeous-Alexander (24)	Jalen Williams (9)	Shai Gilgeous-Alexander (8)	Smoothie King Center; 18,659	3–0
4	April 29	@ New Orleans	W 97–89	Gilgeous-Alexander, Jal. Williams (24)	Shai Gilgeous-Alexander (10)	Chet Holmgren (5)	Smoothie King Center; 18,487	4–0

Conference Semifinals: 2–4 (home: 1–2; road: 1–2)

Game	Date	Team	Score	High points	High rebounds	High assists	Location Attendance	Series
1	May 7	Dallas	W 117–95	Shai Gilgeous-Alexander (29)	Gilgeous-Alexander, Jay. Williams (9)	Shai Gilgeous-Alexander (9)	Paycom Center; 18,203	1–0
2	May 9	Dallas	L 110–119	Shai Gilgeous-Alexander (33)	Shai Gilgeous-Alexander (12)	Shai Gilgeous-Alexander (8)	Paycom Center; 18,203	1–1
3	May 11	@ Dallas	L 101–105	Shai Gilgeous-Alexander (31)	Shai Gilgeous-Alexander (10)	Jalen Williams (8)	American Airlines Center; 20,325	1–2
4	May 13	@ Dallas	W 100–96	Shai Gilgeous-Alexander (34)	Holmgren, Jal. Williams (9)	Jalen Williams (6)	American Airlines Center; 20,607	2–2
5	May 15	Dallas	L 92–104	Shai Gilgeous-Alexander (30)	Dort, Jal. Williams, Gilgeous-Alexander (6)	Shai Gilgeous-Alexander (8)	Paycom Center; 18,203	2–3
6	May 18	@ Dallas	L 116–117	Shai Gilgeous-Alexander (36)	Jalen Williams (9)	Jal. Williams, Gilgeous-Alexander (8)	American Airlines Center; 20,555	2–4

2024 playoff schedule

=== In-Season Tournament ===
This was the first regular season where all the NBA teams competed in a mid-season tournament setting due to the implementation of the 2023 NBA In-Season Tournament. During the in-season tournament period, the Thunder competed in Group C of the Western Conference, which included the Sacramento Kings, Golden State Warriors, Minnesota Timberwolves and San Antonio Spurs.

==== West group C ====
Pos	Team	Pld	W	L	PF	PA	PD	Qualification	SAC	MIN	GSW	OKC	SAS
1	Sacramento Kings	4	4	0	482	452	+30	Advance to knockout stage	—	124–111	124–123	105–98	129–120
2	Minnesota Timberwolves	4	3	1	438	438	0		111–124	—	104–101	106–103	117–110
3	Golden State Warriors	4	2	2	483	479	+4		123–124	101–104	—	141–139	118–112
4	Oklahoma City Thunder	4	1	3	463	439	+24		98–105	103–106	139–141	—	123–87
5	San Antonio Spurs	4	0	4	429	487	−58		120–129	110–117	112–118	87–123	—

Source: NBA
Rules for classification: Tiebreakers

=== Record vs. opponents ===
Record vs. opponents

Eastern Conference
Opponent		H	A	T	W%
Atlantic Division
BOS	Boston Celtics	1–0	0–1	1–1	.500
BKN	Brooklyn Nets	1–0	0–1	1–1	.500
NYK	New York Knicks	1–0	1–0	2–0	1.000
PHI	Philadelphia 76ers	0–1	0–1	0–2	.000
TOR	Toronto Raptors	1–0	1–0	2–0	1.000
Total		4–1	2–3	6–4	.600
Central Division
CHI	Chicago Bulls	1–0	1–0	2–0	1.000
CLE	Cleveland Cavaliers	1–0	1–0	2–0	1.000
DET	Detroit Pistons	1–0	0–1	1–1	.500
IND	Indiana Pacers	0–1	0–1	0–2	.000
MIL	Milwaukee Bucks	1–0	0–1	1–1	.500
Total		4–1	2–3	6–4	.600
Southeast Division
ATL	Atlanta Hawks	1–0	0–1	1–1	.500
CHA	Charlotte Hornets	1–0	1–0	2–0	1.000
MIA	Miami Heat	1–0	1–0	2–0	1.000
ORL	Orlando Magic	1–0	1–0	2–0	1.000
WAS	Washington Wizards	1–0	1–0	2–0	1.000
Total		5–0	4–1	9–1	.900
Conference total		13–2	8–7	21–9	.700

Western Conference
Opponent		H	A	T	W%
Northwest Division
DEN	Denver Nuggets	1–1	2–0	3–1	.750
MIN	Minnesota Timberwolves	1–1	1–1	2–2	.500
OKC	Oklahoma City Thunder	—			
POR	Portland Trail Blazers	2–0	2–0	4–0	1.000
UTA	Utah Jazz	2–0	1–1	3–1	.750
Total		6–2	6–2	12–4	.750
Pacific Division
GSW	Golden State Warriors	1–1	2–0	3–1	.750
LAC	Los Angeles Clippers	2–0	0–1	2–1	.667
LAL	Los Angeles Lakers	1–1	0–2	1–3	.250
PHX	Phoenix Suns	1–0	2–0	3–0	1.000
SAC	Sacramento Kings	2–0	0–2	2–2	.500
Total		7–2	4–5	11–7	.611
Southwest Division
DAL	Dallas Mavericks	2–0	1–1	3–1	.750
HOU	Houston Rockets	1–1	1–1	2–2	.500
MEM	Memphis Grizzlies	2–0	1–0	3–0	1.000
NOP	New Orleans Pelicans	0–1	2–0	2–1	.667
SAS	San Antonio Spurs	2–0	1–1	3–1	.750
Total		7–2	6–3	13–5	.722
Conference total		20–6	16–10	36–16	.692

== Player statistics ==
Legend
GP	Games played	GS	Games started	MPG	Minutes per game
FG%	Field goal percentage	3P%	3-point field goal percentage	FT%	Free throw percentage
RPG	Rebounds per game	APG	Assists per game	SPG	Steals per game
BPG	Blocks per game	PPG	Points per game	**Bold**	Career high

Sabremetrics
TS%	True shooting percentage	eFG%	Effective field goal percentage	ORB%	Offensive rebound percentage
DRB%	Defensive rebound percentage	TRB%	Total rebound percentage	AST%	Assist percentage
STL%	Steal percentage	BLK%	Block percentage	TOV%	Turnover percentage
USG%	Usage percentage	ORtg	Offensive rating	DRtg	Defensive rating
PER	Player efficiency rating

=== Preseason ===
Player	GP	GS	MPG	FG%	3P%	FT%	RPG	APG	SPG	BPG	PPG
Dāvis Bertāns	4	0	10.4	52.4%	52.4%	100%	1.0	0.5	0.8	0.0	9.0
Ousmane Dieng	5	1	22.7	40.5%	35.0%	87.5%	4.6	3.0	0.0	0.2	8.8
Luguentz Dort	4	4	21.9	51.6%	42.1%	81.8%	2.8	0.8	0.3	0.0	12.3
Josh Giddey	4	4	22.3	51.2%	0.0%	54.5%	5.5	5.3	0.5	0.0	12.0
Shai Gilgeous-Alexander	2	2	23.3	43.8%	50.0%	83.3%	3.5	4.0	3.0	1.0	11.0
Chet Holmgren	4	4	19.3	57.9%	50.0%	75.0%	5.0	1.3	0.3	2.0	16.3
Isaiah Joe	4	0	16.3	46.2%	42.1%	92.9%	1.8	0.8	0.5	0.0	11.3
Keyontae Johnson	4	0	11.6	46.2%	25.0%	50.0%	1.0	0.5	0.5	0.3	4.0
Tre Mann	4	0	16.0	37.9%	23.1%	100%	3.3	2.0	0.3	0.3	7.3
Vasilije Micić	4	1	18.5	30.8%	15.4%	50.0%	2.3	6.0	1.0	0.0	5.5
Jeremiah Robinson-Earl ^{T}	3	0	14.3	26.7%	0.0%	100%	3.7	2.3	0.0	0.0	3.3
Olivier Sarr	4	1	13.5	63.6%	50.0%	100%	4.3	1.3	0.3	0.8	4.8
Cason Wallace	4	2	19.7	50.0%	42.9%	66.7%	2.8	2.0	1.5	0.0	7.3
Lindy Waters III	4	0	11.9	48.0%	31.3%	50.0%	2.8	0.8	0.5	0.0	7.8
Jack White ^{T}	4	0	11.8	50.0%	33.3%	60.0%	2.8	0.5	0.3	0.5	4.0
Aaron Wiggins	4	1	16.7	41.7%	28.6%	66.7%	3.5	0.5	0.3	0.0	6.5
Jalen Williams	4	4	22.8	47.9%	35.7%	69.6%	2.8	3.0	1.8	0.3	16.8
Jaylin Williams	2	1	19.8	66.7%	60.0%	80.0%	8.0	2.5	0.0	0.5	11.5
Kenrich Williams	2	0	13.4	25.0%	33.3%	–	3.0	4.0	0.5	1.0	2.5

Led team in statistic

Source: RealGM
^{T} Waived/Traded after preseason

=== Regular season ===
Player	GP	GS	MPG	FG%	3P%	FT%	RPG	APG	SPG	BPG	PPG
Dāvis Bertāns ^{†}	15	0	6.1	38.5%	41.7%	93.3%	0.7	0.6	0.2	0.2	2.9
Bismack Biyombo ^{≠}	10	0	7.3	58.3%	–	50.0%	1.8	0.2	0.1	0.3	1.8
Ousmane Dieng	33	0	11.1	42.2%	30.0%	87.5%	1.5	1.1	0.2	0.2	4.0
Luguentz Dort	79	79	28.4	43.8%	39.4%	82.6%	3.6	1.4	0.9	0.6	10.9
Adam Flagler ^{≠}	2	0	7.0	14.3%	16.7%	–	0.0	2.0	0.0	0.0	1.5
Josh Giddey	80	80	25.1	47.5%	33.7%	80.6%	6.4	4.8	0.7	0.6	12.3
Shai Gilgeous-Alexander	75	75	34.0	53.5%	35.3%	87.4%	5.5	6.2	2.0	0.9	30.1
Gordon Hayward ^{≠}	26	3	17.2	45.3%	51.7%	69.2%	2.5	1.6	0.5	0.0	5.3
Chet Holmgren	82	82	29.4	53.0%	37.0%	79.3%	7.9	2.4	0.6	2.3	16.5
Isaiah Joe	78	1	18.5	45.8%	41.6%	86.5%	2.3	1.3	0.6	0.3	8.2
Keyontae Johnson	9	0	7.3	31.3%	33.3%	–	1.1	0.4	0.1	0.0	1.2
Tre Mann ^{†}	13	0	9.2	50.0%	42.1%	100%	1.8	1.5	0.2	0.0	3.8
Vasilije Micić ^{†}	30	0	12.0	40.7%	24.4%	73.7%	0.8	2.5	0.3	0.1	3.3
Mike Muscala ^{≠}	16	0	5.7	36.4%	9.1%	0%	1.3	0.3	0.1	0.1	1.1
Aleksej Pokuševski ^{‡}	10	0	6.0	25.0%	18.2%	50.0%	1.0	0.5	0.1	0.1	1.2
Olivier Sarr	15	0	6.5	57.9%	33.3%	66.7%	2.4	0.1	0.0	0.5	2.3
Cason Wallace	82	13	20.6	49.1%	41.9%	78.4%	2.3	1.5	0.9	0.5	6.8
Lindy Waters III	38	0	7.4	47.1%	43.5%	100%	1.1	0.6	0.1	0.2	3.6
Aaron Wiggins	78	4	15.7	56.2%	49.2%	78.9%	2.4	1.1	0.7	0.2	6.9
Jalen Williams	71	71	31.3	54.0%	42.7%	81.4%	4.0	4.5	1.1	0.6	19.1
Jaylin Williams	69	1	13.0	41.7%	36.8%	80.5%	3.4	1.6	0.4	0.4	4.0
Kenrich Williams	69	1	14.9	46.8%	39.7%	50.0%	3.0	1.3	0.6	0.1	4.7

Led team in statistic

Source: Basketball-Reference
^{‡} Waived during the season
^{†} Traded during the season
^{≠} Acquired during the season

=== Playoffs ===
Player	GP	GS	MPG	FG%	3P%	FT%	RPG	APG	SPG	BPG	PPG
Ousmane Dieng	4	0	1.8	50.0%	0.0%	–	0.0	0.0	0.0	0.0	0.5
Luguentz Dort	10	10	35.0	36.3%	39.1%	84.2%	4.6	2.0	1.3	0.2	10.7
Josh Giddey	10	8	18.1	45.3%	35.3%	87.5%	3.6	2.1	0.2	0.4	8.7
Shai Gilgeous-Alexander	10	10	39.9	49.6%	43.2%	79.0%	7.2	6.4	1.3	1.7	30.2
Gordon Hayward	7	0	6.6	0.0%	–	–	1.9	0.4	0.1	0.1	0.0
Chet Holmgren	10	10	34.5	49.6%	26.0%	75.8%	7.2	2.1	0.7	2.5	15.6
Isaiah Joe	10	2	17.3	44.4%	41.0%	–	2.2	1.0	0.5	0.0	6.4
Cason Wallace	10	0	19.8	39.0%	32.1%	50.0%	1.3	1.0	0.9	0.2	4.2
Lindy Waters III	3	0	2.8	0.0%	0.0%	–	0.3	0.0	0.0	0.0	0.0
Aaron Wiggins	10	0	15.7	48.9%	30.0%	90.9%	3.2	1.0	0.6	0.3	6.2
Jalen Williams	10	10	37.7	46.9%	38.5%	81.5%	6.8	5.4	1.7	0.5	18.7
Jaylin Williams	10	0	12.7	48.5%	40.9%	75.0%	3.2	1.5	0.4	0.3	4.4
Kenrich Williams	7	0	4.5	25.0%	0.0%	–	1.1	0.4	0.1	0.0	0.6

Led team in statistic

=== Individual game highs ===
Category	Player	Statistic
Points	Shai Gilgeous-Alexander	43 vs Cavaliers on November 8, 2023; 43 vs Kings on December 14, 2023
Rebounds	Chet Holmgren	14 vs Trail Blazers on March 6, 2024; 14 vs Jazz on March 20, 2024
Assists	Shai Gilgeous-Alexander	14 vs Raptors on February 2, 2024
Steals	Shai Gilgeous-Alexander	7 vs Spurs on November 14, 2023
Blocks	Chet Holmgren	8 vs Nuggets on December 16, 2023

== Awards and records ==
=== Awards ===
Date	Player	Award
December 4, 2023	Chet Holmgren	October/November Rookie of the Month
January 2, 2024	Shai Gilgeous-Alexander	December 25–31 Player of the Week
January 4, 2024	Shai Gilgeous-Alexander	December Player of the Month
January 4, 2024	Chet Holmgren	December Rookie of the Month
January 25, 2024	Shai Gilgeous-Alexander	NBA All-Star
January 30, 2024	Chet Holmgren	NBA Rising Stars
January 30, 2024	Cason Wallace	NBA Rising Stars
January 30, 2024	Jalen Williams	NBA Rising Stars
April 28, 2024	Mark Daigneault	NBA Coach of the Year

=== Records ===
- On October 27, 2023, Chet Holmgren set a Thunder rookie record with 7 blocks against the Cleveland Cavaliers, surpassing his teammate Aleksej Pokuševski.
- On December 8, 2023, the Thunder set a team record with 29 forced turnovers against the Golden State Warriors.
- On January 18, 2024, the Thunder set a team record with 24 assists in the first half against the Utah Jazz.
- On March 12, 2024, Shai Gilgeous-Alexander passed Kevin Durant for the Thunder's single season record for most 30-point games against the Indiana Pacers.
- On March 31, 2024, Josh Giddey became the first player to record a triple-double in their first three games played at Madison Square Garden against the New York Knicks.

=== Milestones ===
- On November 22, 2023, Shai Gilgeous-Alexander passed Serge Ibaka on the Thunder's all-time scoring list.

== Injuries ==
Player	Duration		Injury	Games missed
Player	Start	End	Injury	Games missed
Kenrich Williams	October 15, 2023	November 13, 2023	Low back spasms	10
Jaylin Williams	October 17, 2023	November 3, 2023	Right hamstring strain	5
Shai Gilgeous-Alexander	November 2, 2023	November 6, 2023	Left knee sprain	1
Jalen Williams	November 19, 2023	November 28, 2023	Left hip strain	3
Luguentz Dort	December 11, 2023	December 12, 2023	Left ankle sprain	1
Josh Giddey	December 22, 2023	December 26, 2023	Left ankle sprain	1
Jalen Williams	January 31, 2024	February 6, 2024	Right ankle sprain	3
Isaiah Joe	January 31, 2024	February 6, 2024	Sternum contusion	4
Gordon Hayward	February 9, 2024	February 21, 2024	Left calf strain	2
Jaylin Williams	March 2, 2024	March 8, 2024	Left knee sprain	3
Jalen Williams	March 11, 2024	March 14, 2024	Right ankle sprain	1
Shai Gilgeous-Alexander	March 29, 2024	March 31, 2024	Right quad contusion	1
Jalen Williams	April 2, 2024	April 9, 2024	Left ankle sprain	4
Shai Gilgeous-Alexander	April 2, 2024	April 9, 2024	Right quad contusion	4
Gordon Hayward	April 7, 2024	April 10, 2024	Left posterior tibialis strain	2
Josh Giddey	April 12, 2024	April 14, 2024	Right hip contusion	1

=== G League assignments ===
Player	Duration	
Player	Start	End
Jaylin Williams	November 1, 2023	November 1, 2023
Aleksej Pokuševski	November 5, 2023	November 5, 2023
Tre Mann	November 5, 2023	November 5, 2023
Ousmane Dieng	November 5, 2023	November 5, 2023
Ousmane Dieng	November 13, 2023	November 21, 2023
Aleksej Pokuševski	November 21, 2023	November 21, 2023
Tre Mann	November 21, 2023	November 21, 2023
Ousmane Dieng	November 30, 2023	December 8, 2023
Tre Mann	December 5, 2023	December 5, 2023
Ousmane Dieng	December 27, 2023	January 11, 2024
Ousmane Dieng	January 19, 2024	January 30, 2024
Tre Mann	January 24, 2024	January 26, 2024
Ousmane Dieng	February 22, 2024	March 7, 2024
Lindy Waters III	February 23, 2024	February 23, 2024
Lindy Waters III	February 26, 2024	February 27, 2024
Lindy Waters III	February 28, 2024	February 28, 2024
Ousmane Dieng	March 11, 2024	March 18, 2024
Ousmane Dieng	March 21, 2024	April 12, 2024
Lindy Waters III	March 27, 2024	March 27, 2024
Lindy Waters III	March 28, 2024	April 2, 2024
Lindy Waters III	April 11, 2024	March 12, 2024
Ousmane Dieng	April 15, 2024	April 16, 2024
Lindy Waters III	April 15, 2024	April 16, 2024

Source: NBA G League Transactions

== Transactions ==
=== Overview ===
Players Added

Via draft

- Keyontae Johnson

Via trade

- Cason Wallace
  (Draft rights)
- Dāvis Bertāns

Via free agency

- Vasilije Micić
  (Draft rights)
Players Lost

Via trade

- Jeremiah Robinson-Earl

Via free agency

- Jared Butler
- Dario Šarić

=== Trades ===
June 22, 2023	To Oklahoma City Thunder 2029 protected first-round pick via DEN	To Denver Nuggets Draft rights to Julian Strawther via IND; Draft rights to Jalen Pickett via IND; Draft rights to Hunter Tyson via OKC; 2024 least favorable second-round pick of Minnesota and Charlotte via OKC
June 22, 2023	To Indiana Pacers Draft rights to Mojave King via LAL; 2024 least favorable first-round pick via OKC; Cash considerations via LAL	To Los Angeles Lakers Draft rights to Maxwell Lewis via DEN
July 6, 2023	To Oklahoma City Thunder Draft rights to Cason Wallace; Dāvis Bertāns	To Dallas Mavericks Draft rights to Dereck Lively II
July 6, 2023	To Oklahoma City Thunder Victor Oladipo; 2029 second-round pick 2030 second-round pick	To Miami Heat Cash considerations
July 8, 2023	To Oklahoma City Thunder Patty Mills via HOU; 2024 second-round pick via HOU; 2029 second-round pick via HOU; 2030 second-round pick via HOU	To Memphis Grizzlies Josh Christopher via HOU
July 8, 2023	To Atlanta Hawks Usman Garuba via HOU; TyTy Washington Jr. via HOU; Two future second-round picks via HOU; Cash considerations via OKC	To Los Angeles Clippers Kenyon Martin Jr. via HOU
July 8, 2023	To Houston Rockets Dillon Brooks via MEM; Two future second-round picks via LAC; Draft rights to Alpha Kaba via ATL
July 12, 2023	To Oklahoma City Thunder Usman Garuba; Rudy Gay; TyTy Washington Jr. 2026 second-round pick	To Atlanta Hawks Patty Mills
October 17, 2023	To Oklahoma City Thunder Kevin Porter Jr. 2027 MIN second-round pick 2028 MIL second-round pick	To Houston Rockets Victor Oladipo; Jeremiah Robinson-Earl
February 8, 2024	To Oklahoma City Thunder 2028 first-round pick swap	To Dallas Mavericks 2024 second-least favorable first-round pick of Houston, LA Clippers, Utah, and OKC
February 8, 2024	To Oklahoma City Thunder Gordon Hayward	To Charlotte Hornets Dāvis Bertāns; Tre Mann; Vasilije Micić; 2024 HOU second-round pick 2025 PHI second-round pick Cash considerations

=== Free agency ===
==== Re-signings ====
Date	Player	Contract
August 18, 2023	Lindy Waters III	Two-way
August 21, 2023	Olivier Sarr	Two-way
In-Season Re-Signings
February 9, 2024	Lindy Waters III	Multi-year

a: Lindy Waters III had his team option declined and was later signed to a two-way contract.

==== Additions ====
Date	Player	Contract	Former team
July 17, 2023	Vasilije Micić	Multi-year	(Turkey) Anadolu Efes
July 20, 2023	Jack White	Multi-year	Denver Nuggets
In-Season Additions
February 10, 2024	Bismack Biyombo	Standard	Memphis Grizzlies
February 12, 2024	Adam Flagler	Two-way	Oklahoma City Blue (G League)
March 2, 2024	Mike Muscala	Standard	Detroit Pistons

==== Subtractions ====
Date	Player	Reason	New team
June 30, 2023	Jared Butler	Free agent	Washington Wizards
June 30, 2023	Dario Šarić	Free agent	Golden State Warriors
July 20, 2023	Rudy Gay	Waived	N/A
August 18, 2023	TyTy Washington Jr.	Waived	Milwaukee Bucks
August 21, 2023	Usman Garuba	Waived	Golden State Warriors
October 17, 2023	Kevin Porter Jr.	Waived	(Greece) PAOK
October 22, 2023	Jack White	Waived	South Bay Lakers (G League)
In-Season Subtractions
February 23, 2024	Aleksej Pokuševski	Waived	Charlotte Hornets

== G League ==
Notable roster changes

Additions

- On July 7, the Thunder signed Keyontae Johnson to a two-way contract
- On August 18, the Thunder signed Lindy Waters III to a two-way contract
- On August 21, the Thunder signed Olivier Sarr to a two-way contract
- On February 12, the Thunder signed Adam Flagler to a two-way contract

Subtractions

- On February 28, the Blue waived Abdul Gaddy
- On March 4, Jahmi'us Ramsey signed with the Toronto Raptors
- On February 9, the Thunder converted Lindy Waters III to a standard contract

Assignments

- Ousmane Dieng, Tre Mann, Lindy Waters III
Source: NBA G League Transactions

The Oklahoma City Blue started their 10th season of the franchise in Oklahoma City and their 23rd season in the NBA G League. Last season, the Blue finished with a record of 13–19 and failed to make the playoffs.

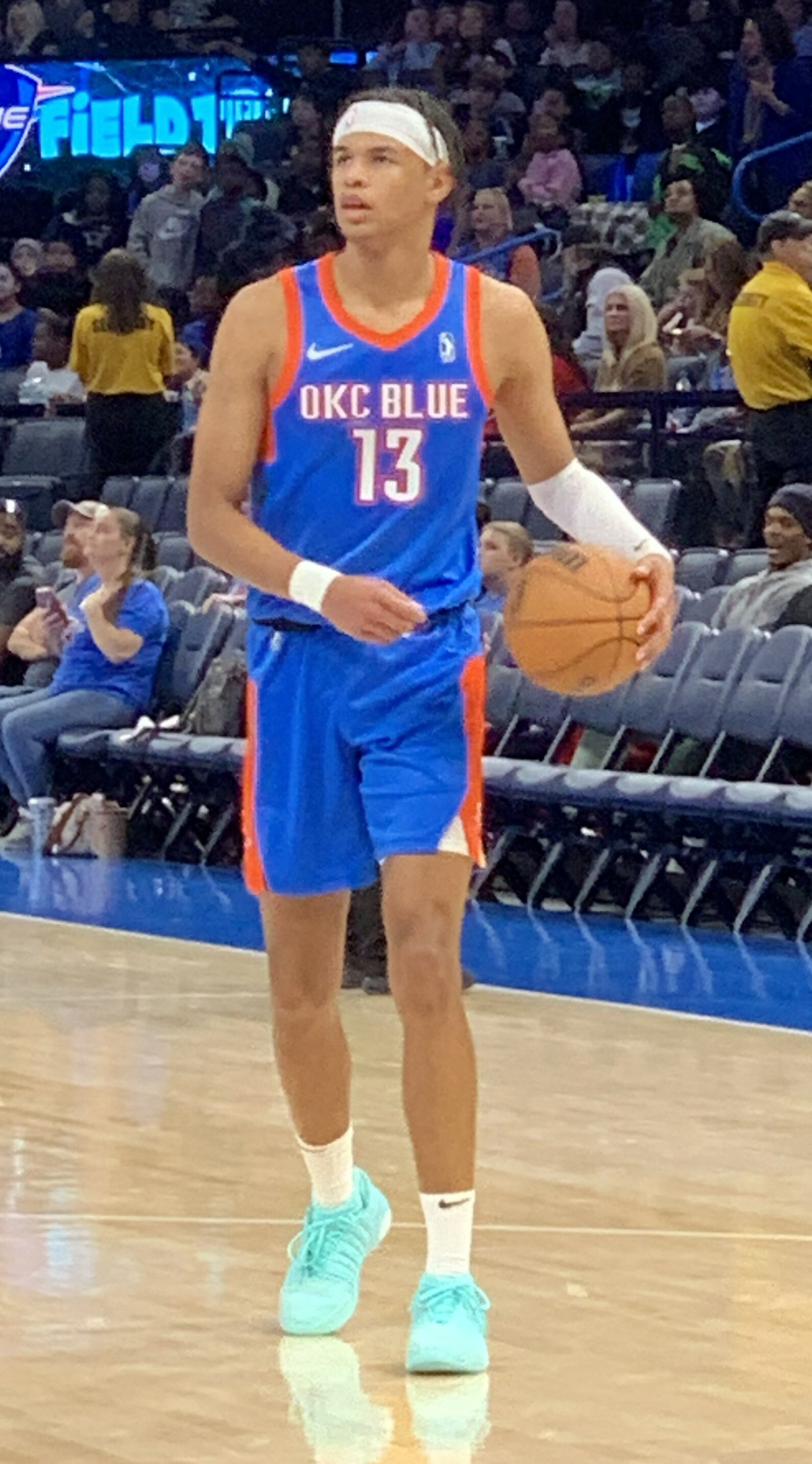
Ousmane Dieng was named NBA G League Finals MVP.

Under Kameron Woods's second season, the Blue finished the regular season with a 21–13 record and qualified for the playoffs for the first time since the 2018–19 season. Entering the playoffs as the third seed, the Blue defeated Rio Grande Valley Vipers in the first round in a 126–125 overtime win behind Ousmane Dieng's game winner. Advancing into the semifinals, the Blue defeated Sioux Falls Skyforce in a 111–93 win after winning the fourth quarter 34–18 to advance to the conference finals for the first time since 2019. Facing off against the top-seeded Stockton Kings, the Blue outscored the Kings by 24 points to lead 58–45 at halftime. Despite a late comeback, the Blue won 114–107 and advanced to their second-ever G League Finals since the team was known as the Tulsa 66ers. In the best-of-three series against Maine Celtics, the Blue split the first two games, with both teams winning at home. In the decisive game three, the Blue built on an early lead and outscored the Celtics by 16 points to hold a 63–40 halftime lead. After a back-and-forth third quarter, the Blue led 92–67 entering the fourth quarter. Behind Ousmane Dieng and Jahmi'us Ramsey, the Blue won its first-ever championship, defeating the Celtics 117–100, clinching their first championship since becoming the only affiliate for the Oklahoma City Thunder. Thunder assignment Ousmane Dieng was named NBA G League Finals MVP after scoring 25 points, 6 rebounds, 4 assists, and 2 blocks.
