= Ousmane Dieng =

French basketball player (born 2003)

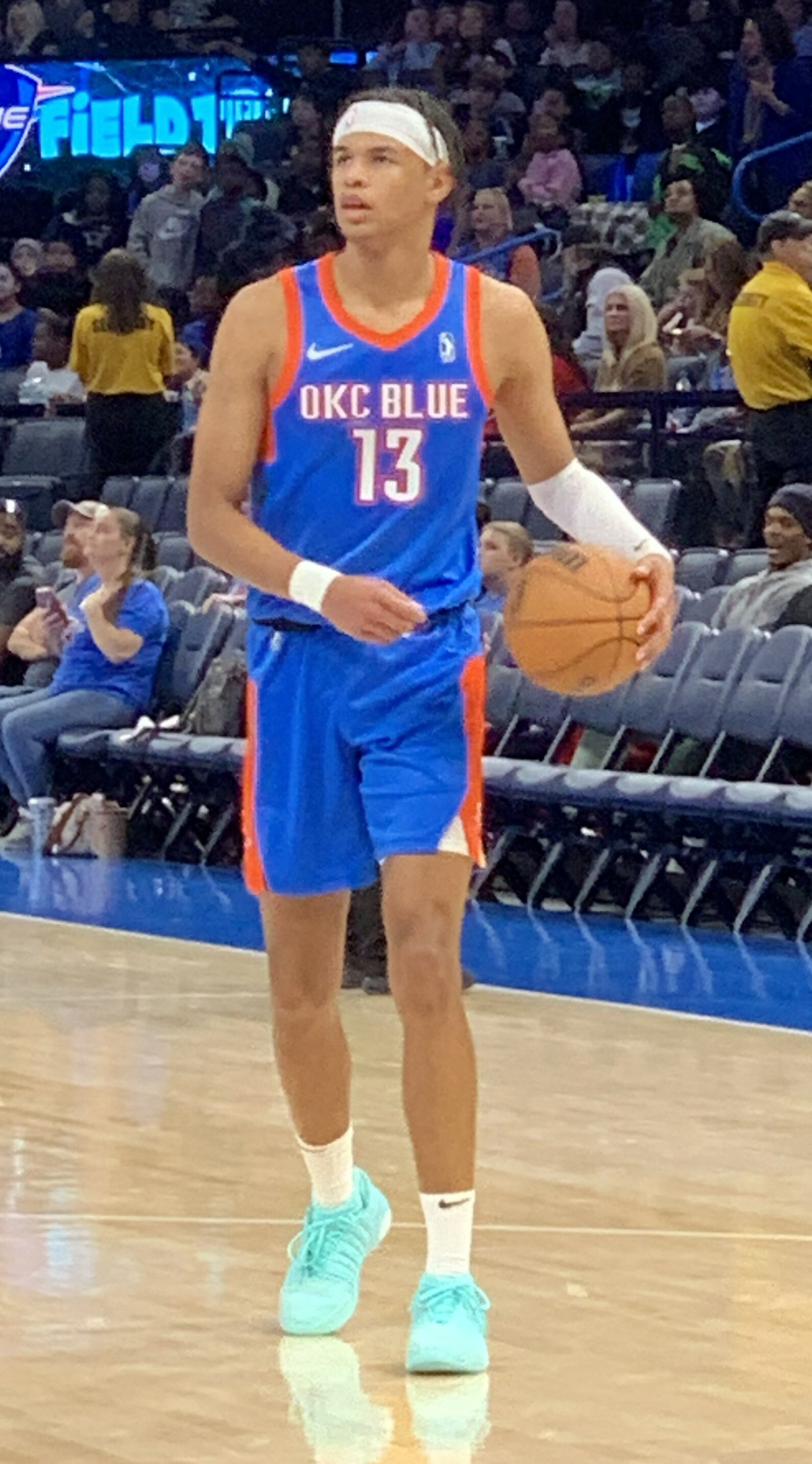
- Dieng with the Oklahoma City Blue in 2023

No. 21 – Milwaukee Bucks
- Position: Small forward
- League: NBA

Personal information
- Born: 21 May 2003 (age 23) Villeneuve-sur-Lot, France
- Listed height: 6 ft 9 in (2.06 m)
- Listed weight: 185 lb (84 kg)

Career information
- High school: INSEP (Paris, France)
- NBA draft: 2022: 1st round, 11th overall pick
- Drafted by: New York Knicks
- Playing career: 2020–present

Career history
- 2020–2021: Centre Fédéral
- 2021–2022: New Zealand Breakers
- 2022–2026: Oklahoma City Thunder
- 2022–2025: →Oklahoma City Blue
- 2026–present: Milwaukee Bucks

Career highlights
- NBA champion (2025); NBA G League champion (2024); NBA G League Finals MVP (2024)
- Stats at NBA.com
- Stats at Basketball Reference
Medals
Men's basketball
Representing France
FIBA U16 European Championship
Silver medal – second place	2019 Italy	Team

Ousmane Dieng (/ˈuːsmɑːn ˈdʒɛŋ/ OOSS-mahn JENG; born 21 May 2003) is a French professional basketball player for the Milwaukee Bucks of the National Basketball Association (NBA). After playing 3 years in France and New Zealand, Dieng was selected in the 2022 NBA draft with the 11th overall pick by the New York Knicks, but was traded to the Oklahoma City Thunder on draft night. During the 2024–25 season, Dieng won his first NBA Championship with the Thunder.

== Early life and youth career ==
Dieng grew up in Lot-et-Garonne in southwestern France. His father Ababacar, originally from Senegal, was a former professional basketball player in France.

At the youth level, Dieng played for Villeneuve Basket Club and JSA Bordeaux. He attended the national athletics boarding school INSEP in Paris, and competed for its under-18 team at the Next Generation Tournament.

== Professional career ==
=== Centre Fédéral (2020–2021) ===
In the 2020–21 season, Dieng averaged 12.6 points, 5.8 rebounds, and 2.9 assists per game for Centre Fédéral in the Nationale Masculine 1.

=== New Zealand Breakers (2021–2022) ===
On 1 June 2021, Dieng announced that he would play for the New Zealand Breakers of the National Basketball League (NBL) in the 2021–22 season, alongside fellow Frenchman and eventual 2022 NBA draft selection Hugo Besson. He became the first European player to join the league's Next Stars program to develop NBA draft prospects. Dieng had also been recruited by major college basketball programs and the NBA G League Ignite. Dieng left the Breakers on 17 April 2022 in order to prepare for the 2022 NBA draft.

=== Oklahoma City Thunder / Blue (2022–2026) ===
Dieng was selected with the eleventh overall pick by the New York Knicks in the 2022 NBA draft, and was then immediately traded to the Oklahoma City Thunder in exchange for three 2023 first-round draft picks. On 15 April 2024, he won the NBA G League title with the Oklahoma City Blue and was named the championship game most valuable player after getting 25 points, six boards, four assists and two blocks in the win against the Maine Celtics.

Throughout his first three seasons, Dieng has been assigned several times to the Oklahoma City Blue.

In the 2024–25 NBA season, Dieng appeared in 37 games, as Oklahoma City clinched its first-ever NBA championship with a victory over the Indiana Pacers. Dieng played in 27 games for Oklahoma City during the 2025–26 season, averaging 3.7 points, 1.6 rebounds, and 1.0 assist.

=== Milwaukee Bucks (2026–present) ===
On 4 February 2026, Dieng was traded with a 2029 second round pick to the Charlotte Hornets in exchange for Mason Plumlee. Later in the day, Dieng, Collin Sexton, and three second-round draft picks were traded to the Chicago Bulls in exchange for Coby White and Mike Conley Jr. On 6 February, Dieng was traded again to the Milwaukee Bucks in a trade that also involved the Phoenix Suns. In his Bucks debut on 11 February, he scored 17 points and made a career-high five three-pointers made during a 116–108 win over the Orlando Magic. On 1 April, Dieng put up a career-high 36 points, along with 10 assists, in a 119-113 loss to the Houston Rockets. He made 30 appearances (including 20 starts) for Milwaukee, recording averages of 11.0 points, 4.6 rebounds, and 3.6 assists (all career–highs).

On 30 June 2026, Dieng re-signed with Milwaukee on three-year, $17.5 million contract.

== National team career ==
Dieng represented France at the 2019 FIBA U16 European Championship in Italy. He averaged 8.9 points, 3.6 assists and 2.7 rebounds per game, helping his team win the silver medal.

== Career statistics ==
Legend
GP	Games played	GS	Games started	MPG	Minutes per game
FG%	Field goal percentage	3P%	3-point field goal percentage	FT%	Free throw percentage
RPG	Rebounds per game	APG	Assists per game	SPG	Steals per game
BPG	Blocks per game	PPG	Points per game	**Bold**	Career high
†	Won an NBA championship

=== NBA ===
==== Regular season ====
Year	Team	GP	GS	MPG	FG%	3P%	FT%	RPG	APG	SPG	BPG	PPG
2022–23	Oklahoma City	**39**	1	14.6	.420	.265	.652	2.7	1.2	.4	.2	4.9
2023–24	Oklahoma City	33	0	11.1	.422	.300	.875	1.5	1.1	.2	.2	4.0
2024–25†	Oklahoma City	37	1	10.9	**.432**	.324	.688	2.2	.8	.5	.2	3.8
2025–26	Oklahoma City	27	0	10.9	.418	**.367**	**1.000**	1.6	1.0	.1	**.3**	3.7
2025–26	Milwaukee	30	**20**	**26.8**	.423	.331	.667	**4.6**	**3.6**	**.8**	**.3**	**11.0**
Career		166	22	14.7	.423	.314	.720	2.5	1.5	.4	.2	5.4

==== Playoffs ====
Year	Team	GP	GS	MPG	FG%	3P%	FT%	RPG	APG	SPG	BPG	PPG
2024	Oklahoma City	4	0	1.8	**.500**	.000	—	.0	.0	.0	.0	.5
2025†	Oklahoma City	**9**	0	**3.6**	.400	**.571**	**1.000**	**.4**	**.3**	.0	**.1**	**1.6**
Career		13	0	3.0	.417	.500	1.000	.3	.2	.0	.1	1.2
