= Luguentz Dort =

Canadian basketball player (born 1999)

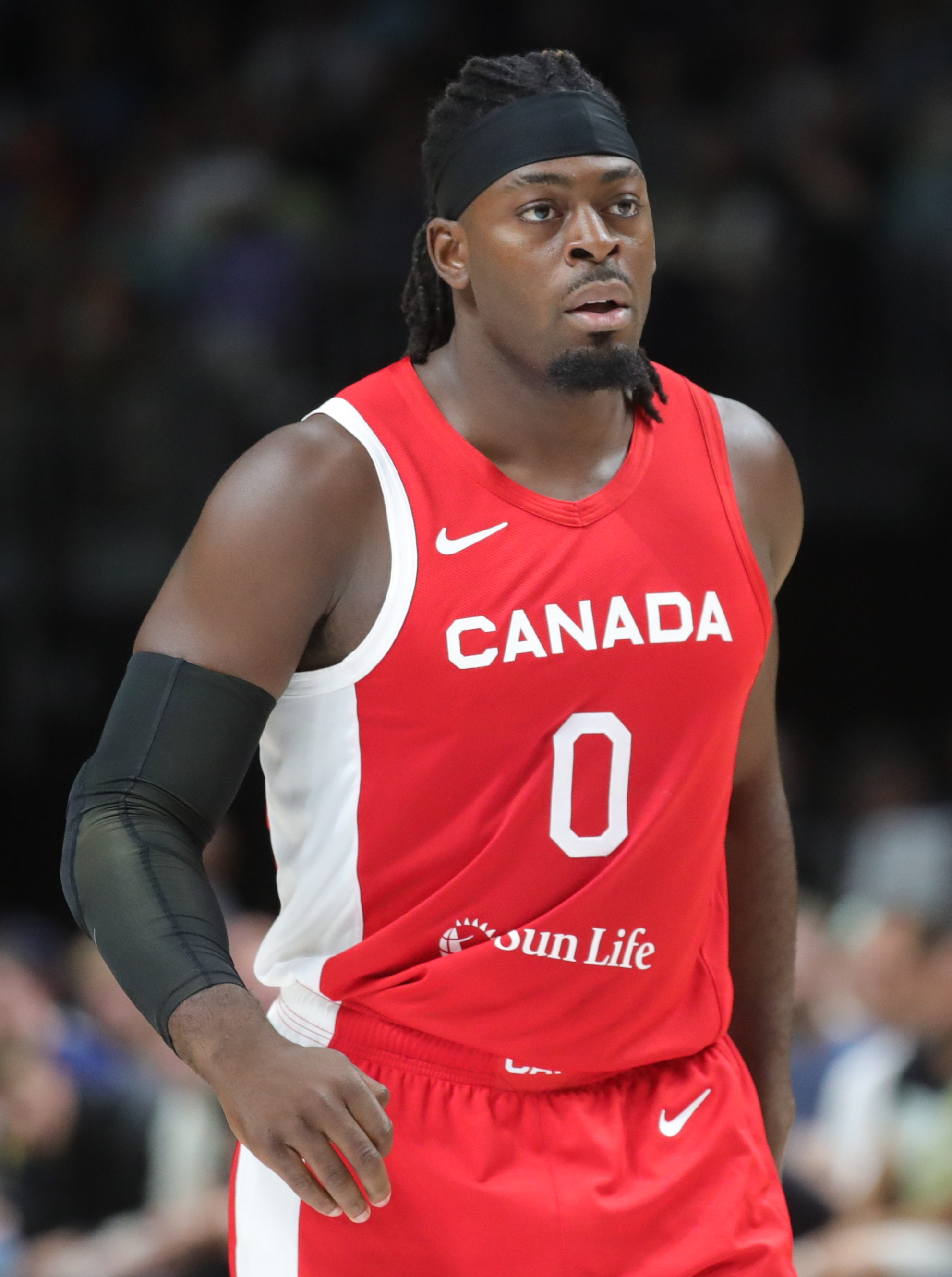
- Dort with Canada in 2023

No. 0 – Atlanta Hawks
- Position: Shooting guard
- League: NBA

Personal information
- Born: April 19, 1999 (age 27) Montreal, Quebec, Canada
- Listed height: 6 ft 4 in (1.93 m)
- Listed weight: 220 lb (100 kg)

Career information
- High school: Arlington Country Day School (Jacksonville, Florida); Conrad Academy (Orlando, Florida); Athlete Institute (Mono, Ontario)
- College: Arizona State (2018–2019)
- NBA draft: 2019: undrafted
- Playing career: 2019–present

Career history
- 2019–2026: Oklahoma City Thunder
- 2019–2020: →Oklahoma City Blue
- 2026–present: Atlanta Hawks

Career highlights
- NBA champion (2025); NBA All-Defensive First Team (2025); Second-team All-Pac-12 (2019); Pac-12 All-Defensive Team (2019); Pac-12 Freshman of the Year (2019); Pac-12 All-Freshman Team (2019); 2× BioSteel All-Canadian Game MVP (2017, 2018)
- Stats at NBA.com
- Stats at Basketball Reference
Medals
Men's basketball
Representing Canada
FIBA World Cup
Bronze medal – third place	2023 Philippines–Japan–Indonesia

Luguentz Dort (born April 19, 1999; French: [dɔʁ] or English: /dɔːrt/ DORT) is a Canadian professional basketball player for the Atlanta Hawks of the National Basketball Association (NBA). He played college basketball for the Arizona State Sun Devils. Dort joined the Oklahoma City Thunder as an undrafted free agent in July 2019 and played there for seven seasons. Highly regarded for his defense, Dort is nicknamed "the Dorture Chamber" and was named to the NBA All-Defensive First Team in 2025, later winning the NBA Finals that same year.

Dort completed his high school career at the Athlete Institute in Mono, Ontario, where he was rated as high as a five-star recruit and was one of the top high school players in Canada. In his first year with Arizona State, he earned second-team All-Pac-12 Conference honours and was named to the all-defensive team in the Pac-12. He was also voted the conference's freshman of the year.

== Early life ==
Dort was born in Montreal, Quebec, to Haitian parents who moved to Canada from Saint-Marc when they were around 21 years old. His father worked as a taxi driver and owner while his mother made clothes for a manufacturer. Dort was raised speaking Haitian Creole with his family.

Growing up in Montréal-Nord, he first played soccer as a goalkeeper, but his brothers later influenced him to play basketball. Dort played street basketball at Saint Laurent Park near his home in Montreal. His involvement in the sport helped him avoid joining street gangs like some of his friends. At age 12, Dort began playing organized basketball in Park Extension, a neighbourhood in Montreal, where he was coached by Nelson Ossé. He started weight training at age 15. At this time, his height was 5 feet 11 inches (1.80 m). He would continue to grow about one inch per year through the rest of his teenage years.

== High school career ==
Dort spent his first season at the high school level in Quebec. Through his high school years, he competed for Brookwood Elite on the Amateur Athletic Union (AAU) circuit. In July 2015, he played for Canada at the adidas Nations tournament, averaging 9.2 points and 4 rebounds through 4 games. As a sophomore, Dort transferred to Arlington Country Day School in Jacksonville, Florida, in the United States to face better competition and learn English. Before moving, his coach Nelson Ossé urged him to improve his poor academic performance. In August 2016, Dort averaged 11.3 points through 6 games to lead Canada to second place at adidas Nations. Later in the month, he was invited to the Nike Americas Team Camp, where he was named most valuable player (MVP) of the All-Star game. Dort moved to Conrad Academy in Orlando, Florida, for his junior season, following his former Arlington Country Day coach Shaun Wiseman. In 2017, he took part in adidas Nations and the Nike Hoop Summit All-Star game. Dort also scored 30 points to win team MVP honors at the BioSteel All-Canadian Basketball Game. On October 18, 2017, he committed to play college basketball for Arizona State, becoming the program's most touted recruit since James Harden in 2007. As a senior, Dort returned to Canada and joined the Athlete Institute, a prep school in Mono, Ontario. In April 2018, he reclaimed team MVP accolades at the BioSteel All-Canadian Game after recording 34 points and 8 rebounds.

College recruiting
Name	Hometown	School	Height	Weight	Commit date
Luguentz Dort; SG	Montreal, Quebec	Athlete Institute (ON)	6 ft 5 in (1.96 m)	200 lb (91 kg)	Oct 18, 2017
Luguentz Dort; SG	Recruit ratings: Rivals: 247Sports: ESPN: (92)				
Overall recruit ranking: Rivals: N/A 247Sports: 33 ESPN: N/A
Note: In many cases, Scout, Rivals, 247Sports, On3, and ESPN may conflict in their listings of height and weight.; In these cases, the average was taken. ESPN grades are on a 100-point scale.; Sources: "Arizona State 2018 Basketball Commitments". Rivals.; "2018 Arizona State Sun Devils Recruiting Class". ESPN.; "2018 Team Ranking". Rivals.

== College career ==
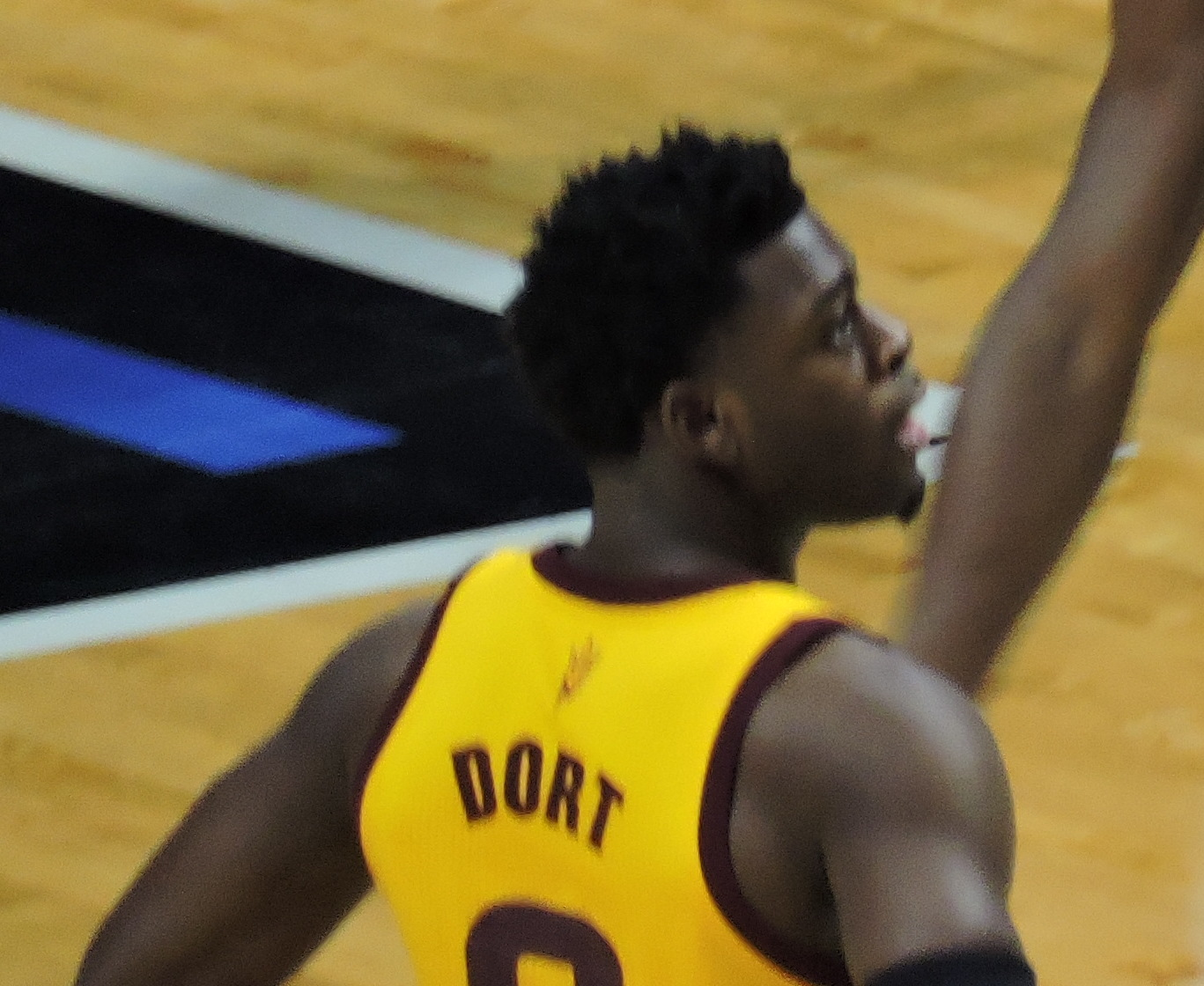
Dort playing against Buffalo in the NCAA tournament

On November 6, 2018, Dort made his debut for Arizona State, tallying 28 points, 9 rebounds, and 3 steals in a 102–94 win over Cal State Fullerton in double-overtime. He broke the school record for freshman debut points. Dort, on November 12, recorded his first double-double, with 12 points and 12 rebounds in a 90–58 win over Long Beach State. On November 21, he posted 33 points, 7 rebounds, and 4 assists against Utah State in the heavyweight bracket of the MGM Resorts Main Event, scoring the third-most points by a freshman in Arizona State history. He was named MVP of the tournament. A few days later, Dort was named Pac-12 Conference Player of the Week. He struggled offensively towards the end of December, shooting a combined 9-of-45 from the field through four games from December 15 to 29.

Following Arizona State's loss in the 2019 NCAA men's basketball tournament, Dort announced his intention to forgo his final three seasons of collegiate eligibility and declare for the 2019 NBA draft.

== Professional career ==
=== Oklahoma City Thunder (2019–2026) ===
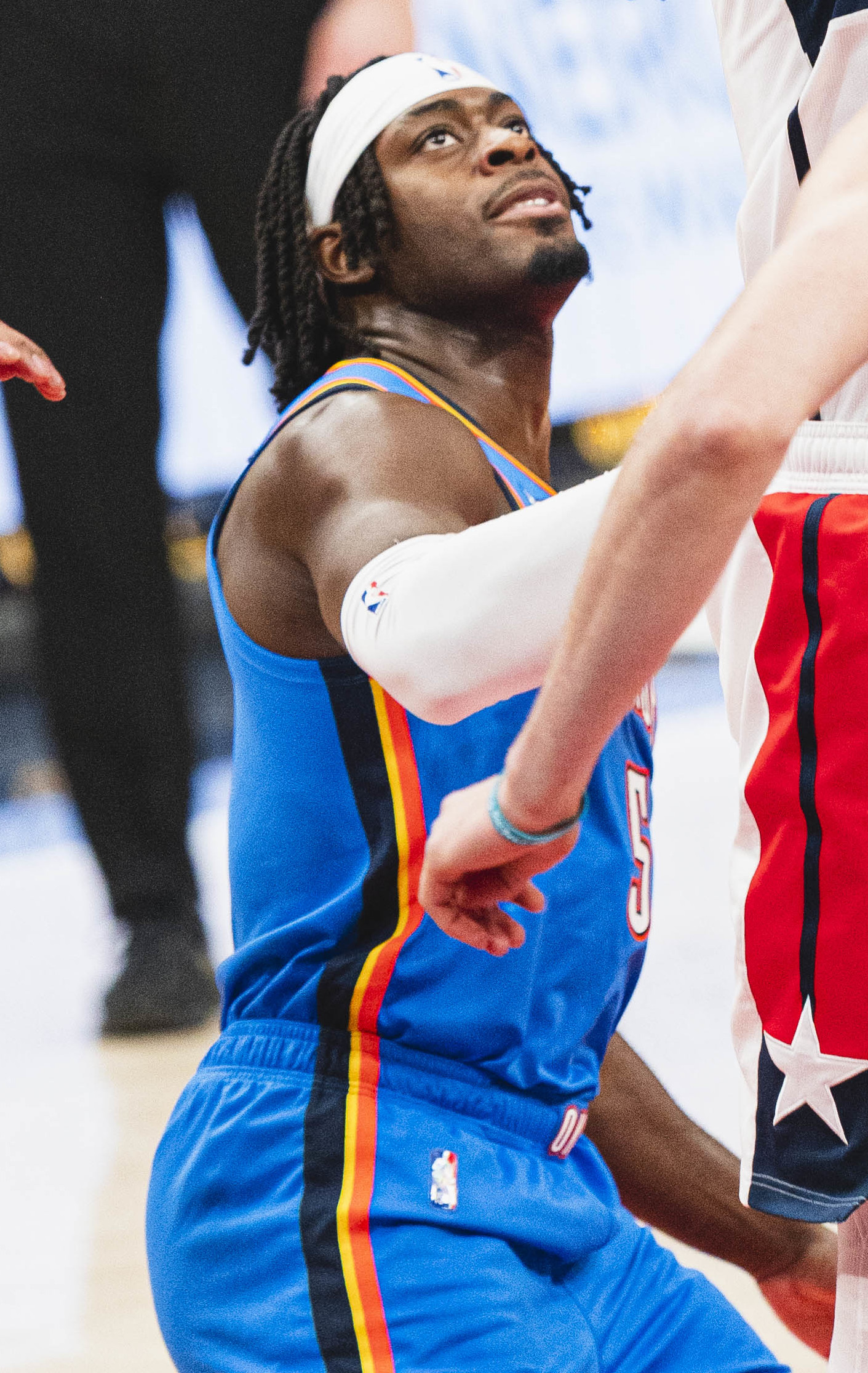
Dort with the Oklahoma City Thunder in 2022

After going undrafted in the 2019 NBA draft, Dort signed a two-way contract with the Oklahoma City Thunder. He made his NBA debut on December 6, 2019, playing 7 minutes and grabbing one rebound in an overtime win against the Minnesota Timberwolves. On January 29, 2020, Dort scored a then career-high 23 points with two rebounds, a steal and a block in a 120–100 win over the Sacramento Kings. In the 2020 NBA playoffs, Dort was lauded for his defense on James Harden during a seven-game round one loss and for, by at least one measure, being "the highest-effort defensive player in the NBA."

On June 24, 2020, the Thunder announced that they had re-signed Dort to a 4-year, $5.4 million contract. On April 13, 2021, Dort scored a career-high 42 points in a 106–96 loss to the Utah Jazz, making seven 3-pointers in the process, also a career-high.

On February 2, 2022, Dort scored a season-high 30 points, including 14 straight points for the Thunder to end the game, in a 120–114 overtime win against the Dallas Mavericks. On March 8, he underwent season-ending surgery to address a labrum tear in his left shoulder.

On July 6, 2022, after he had his team option declined, Dort re-signed with the Thunder on a five-year, $87.5 million contract.

On November 3, 2023, Dort led the Thunder in scoring with 29 points while making all six of his three-point attempts, during a 141–139 loss to the Golden State Warriors.

On June 22, 2025, Dort captured his first NBA title as the Thunder edged out the Indiana Pacers in the Game 7 of the Finals. Dort played a pivotal role in the victory, playing 35 minutes and recording nine points in the championship-clinching performance.

Following a January 27, 2026 game against the New Orleans Pelicans, Dort shoved Pelicans guard Jeremiah Fears, initiating an altercation; both players were subsequently fined $25,000 as a result.

=== Atlanta Hawks (2026–present) ===
On July 19, 2026, Dort was traded to the Atlanta Hawks in a three-team trade. On October 21, he made his debut for the team, recording eight points and four rebounds in a 132–125 win over the Orlando Magic.

== National team career ==
On May 24, 2022, Dort agreed to a three-year commitment to play with the Canadian senior men's national team. He was named to Canada's roster for the 2024 Summer Olympics in Paris.

== Career statistics ==
Legend
GP	Games played	GS	Games started	MPG	Minutes per game
FG%	Field goal percentage	3P%	3-point field goal percentage	FT%	Free throw percentage
RPG	Rebounds per game	APG	Assists per game	SPG	Steals per game
BPG	Blocks per game	PPG	Points per game	**Bold**	Career high
†	Won an NBA championship	*	Led the league

=== NBA ===
==== Regular season ====
Year	Team	GP	GS	MPG	FG%	3P%	FT%	RPG	APG	SPG	BPG	PPG
2019–20	Oklahoma City	36	28	22.8	.394	.297	.792	2.3	.8	.9	.1	6.8
2020–21	Oklahoma City	52	52	29.7	.387	.343	.744	3.6	1.7	.9	.4	14.0
2021–22	Oklahoma City	51	51	**32.6**	.404	.332	**.843**	4.2	1.7	.9	.4	**17.2**
2022–23	Oklahoma City	74	73	30.7	.388	.330	.772	**4.6**	**2.1**	1.0	.3	13.7
2023–24	Oklahoma City	**79**	**79**	28.4	**.438**	.394	.826	3.6	1.4	.9	**.6**	10.9
2024–25†	Oklahoma City	71	71	29.2	.435	**.412**	.717	4.1	1.6	**1.1**	.5	10.1
2025–26	Oklahoma City	69	69	26.8	.385	.344	.759	3.5	1.2	.9	.4	8.3
Career		432	423	28.9	.405	.358	.788	3.8	1.6	.9	.4	11.6

==== Playoffs ====
Year	Team	GP	GS	MPG	FG%	3P%	FT%	RPG	APG	SPG	BPG	PPG
2020	Oklahoma City	6	6	29.2	.355	.260	.533	3.7	1.0	.3	**1.0**	**12.5**
2024	Oklahoma City	10	10	**35.0**	.363	**.391**	**.842**	**4.6**	**2.0**	**1.3**	.2	10.7
2025†	Oklahoma City	**23***	**23***	29.0	**.366**	.343	.636	3.9	.9	**1.3**	.4	7.9
2026	Oklahoma City	15	15	22.3	**.366**	.308	.500	2.7	1.3	.5	.1	5.5
Career		54	54	28.3	.363	.332	.667	3.6	1.2	.9	.4	8.3

=== College ===
Year	Team	GP	GS	MPG	FG%	3P%	FT%	RPG	APG	SPG	BPG	PPG
2018–19	Arizona State	34	33	31.5	.405	.307	.700	4.3	2.3	1.5	.2	16.1
