= Olivier Sarr =

French basketball player (born 1999)

- Sarr with Real Madrid in 2026

No. 33 – Real Madrid
- Position: Center
- League: Liga ACB; EuroLeague

Personal information
- Born: 20 February 1999 (age 27) Niort, France
- Listed height: 2.15 m (7 ft 1 in)
- Listed weight: 240 lb (109 kg)

Career information
- High school: INSEP (Paris, France)
- College: Wake Forest (2017–2020); Kentucky (2020–2021)
- NBA draft: 2021: undrafted
- Playing career: 2021–present

Career history
- 2021–2024: Oklahoma City Thunder
- 2021–2024: →Oklahoma City Blue
- 2025–2026: Raptors 905
- 2026: Cleveland Cavaliers
- 2026: →Cleveland Charge
- 2026–present: Real Madrid

Career highlights
- EuroLeague SuperCup champion (2026); NBA G League champion (2024); Third-team All-ACC (2020)
- Stats at NBA.com
- Stats at Basketball Reference

Olivier Sarr (/oʊˈlɪvjeɪ ˈsɑːr/ oh-LIV-yay SAR, French pronunciation: [ɔlivje saʁ]; born 20 February 1999) is a French professional basketball player for Real Madrid of the Liga ACB and the EuroLeague. He played college basketball for the Wake Forest Demon Deacons and Kentucky Wildcats. He is the older brother of Washington Wizards basketball player Alex Sarr.

== Early life and career ==
Sarr started playing basketball at age three with his father, a former player, and drew inspiration from Hakeem Olajuwon. He played for club teams Bouscat and TOAC before joining INSEP, a sports institute in Paris. He competed for Centre Fédéral in the Nationale Masculine 1 and represented INSEP at the Adidas Next Generation Tournament. Sarr moved to the United States when he was 15 years old. He was considered a four-star recruit by Scout and committed to Wake Forest over offers from California, Vanderbilt and UCF.

== College career ==
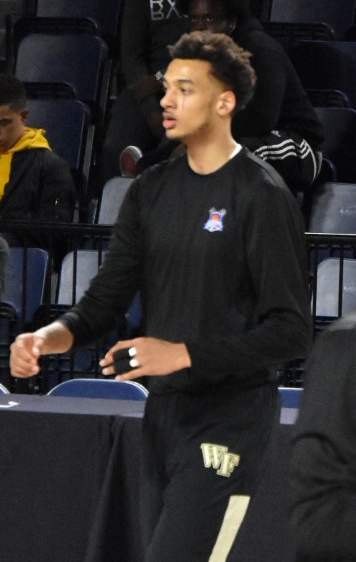
Sarr with Wake Forest in 2017

Sarr averaged 3.2 points and 3.0 rebounds per game as a freshman at Wake Forest. He gained 20 pounds going into his sophomore season. As a sophomore, Sarr started 16 games and averaged 6.2 points and 5.5 rebounds per game, leading the team with 25 blocks. On 29 February 2020, Sarr scored a career-high 37 points and grabbed 17 rebounds in a 84–73 victory over Notre Dame. As a junior, Sarr averaged 13.7 points and 9.0 rebounds per game and had 11 double-doubles. He was named to the Third Team All-ACC. After coach Danny Manning was fired, Sarr entered the transfer portal. In May 2020, he announced he was transferring to Kentucky after receiving interest from Duke, Baylor, Florida State and Gonzaga. Sarr applied for a waiver for immediate eligibility at Kentucky. He, along with fellow transfer Jacob Toppin, received immediate eligibility on 21 October 2020. Sarr averaged 10.8 points, 5.2 rebounds and 1.2 blocks per game. He declared for the 2021 NBA draft, forgoing the additional season of eligibility granted by the NCAA due to the COVID-19 pandemic.

== Professional career ==
=== Oklahoma City Thunder / Blue (2021–2024) ===
After going undrafted in 2021 NBA draft, Sarr played for the Memphis Grizzlies in the NBA Summer League. On 16 October 2021, he was signed and then immediately waived by the Oklahoma City Thunder. He subsequently joined the Oklahoma City Blue of the NBA G League, posting 14 points and 7 rebounds in his debut versus the Salt Lake City Stars.

On 27 December, Sarr signed a 10-day contract with the Thunder and re-joined the Blue on 6 January 2022. Three days later, he signed a second 10-day contract with the Thunder. He was reacquired and activated by the Oklahoma City Blue on 19 January.

On 21 February 2022, Sarr signed a two-way contract with the Thunder. He was waived by the Thunder on 6 April 2022.

Sarr joined the Phoenix Suns for the 2022 NBA Summer League.

On 7 September 2022, the Portland Trail Blazers announced that they had signed Sarr. On 13 October, the Trail Blazers announced that they had converted their contract with Sarr to a two-way contract. On 18 November, the Trail Blazers announced that they had waived Sarr. He never played a game for the team.

On 11 January 2023, Sarr was re-acquired by the Oklahoma City Blue. On 13 February, he signed a two-way contract with the Oklahoma City Thunder and on 21 August, he signed another two-way contract with the Thunder.

In the 2023–24 NBA season, Sarr made 15 appearances for the Thunder, averaging 2.3 points, 2.4 rebounds, and 0.1 assists in 6.5 minutes per game. On 15 April 2024, Sarr suffered a ruptured Achilles in the OKC Blue's G-League Finals victory over the Maine Celtics.

=== Raptors 905 (2025–2026) ===
On 1 August 2025, Sarr signed an Exhibit 10 contract with the Toronto Raptors. He was released by the Raptors on 16 October. He subsequently joined the Raptors 905 of the NBA G League, the Raptors' G League affiliate.

=== Cleveland Cavaliers / Charge (2026) ===
On 3 March 2026, Sarr signed a two-way contract with the Cleveland Cavaliers. Sarr made four appearances for Cleveland, averaging 3.5 points, 2.8 rebounds, and 1.3 assists.

=== Real Madrid (2026–present) ===
On 15 August 2026, Sarr signed a two-year deal with Real Madrid of the Spanish Liga ACB and the EuroLeague.

== National team career ==
Sarr played for France at the 2016 FIBA Under-17 World Championship in Zaragoza, Spain. He averaged 4.4 points and four rebounds per game and helped his team finish in sixth place. At the 2017 FIBA U18 European Championship in Slovakia, Sarr averaged 7.6 points and 5.4 rebounds per game for the sixth-place team.

== Career statistics ==
Legend
GP	Games played	GS	Games started	MPG	Minutes per game
FG%	Field goal percentage	3P%	3-point field goal percentage	FT%	Free throw percentage
RPG	Rebounds per game	APG	Assists per game	SPG	Steals per game
BPG	Blocks per game	PPG	Points per game	**Bold**	Career high

=== NBA ===
Year	Team	GP	GS	MPG	FG%	3P%	FT%	RPG	APG	SPG	BPG	PPG
2021–22	Oklahoma City	**22**	**2**	**19.1**	.574	.448	**.828**	**4.2**	.9	.3	.7	**7.0**
2022–23	Oklahoma City	9	1	12.6	.500	.125	.714	3.4	.4	.1	.6	4.0
2023–24	Oklahoma City	15	0	6.5	.579	.333	.667	2.4	.1	.0	.5	2.3
2025–26	Cleveland	4	0	9.8	**.714**	**.667**	.400	2.8	**1.3**	**.5**	**.8**	3.5
Career		50	3	13.4	.567	.391	.732	3.4	.6	.2	.6	4.7

=== College ===
Year	Team	GP	GS	MPG	FG%	3P%	FT%	RPG	APG	SPG	BPG	PPG
2017–18	Wake Forest	**30**	0	15.1	.348	.250	.600	3.0	.4	.3	.7	3.2
2018–19	Wake Forest	25	16	21.7	.472	.250	.705	5.5	.5	**.4**	1.0	6.2
2019–20	Wake Forest	**30**	15	**26.7**	**.527**	.143	.761	**9.0**	.9	**.4**	**1.2**	**13.7**
2020–21	Kentucky	25	**25**	25.1	.470	**.444**	**.791**	5.2	**1.3**	**.4**	**1.2**	10.8
Career		110	56	22.0	.476	.311	.740	5.7	.8	.4	1.0	8.5

== Personal life ==
Sarr is of Senegalese descent. His father played professional basketball in France while his younger brother Alex plays for the NBA's Washington Wizards.
