= Lindy Waters III =

American basketball player (born 1997)

No. 43 – Beijing Ducks
- Position: Shooting guard
- League: CBA

Personal information
- Born: July 28, 1997 (age 29) Boulder, Colorado, U.S.
- Listed height: 6 ft 5 in (1.96 m)
- Listed weight: 210 lb (95 kg)

Career information
- High school: Norman North (Norman, Oklahoma); Sunrise Christian Academy (Bel Aire, Kansas)
- College: Oklahoma State (2016–2020)
- NBA draft: 2020: undrafted
- Playing career: 2021–present

Career history
- 2021: Enid Outlaws
- 2021–2022: Oklahoma City Blue
- 2022–2024: Oklahoma City Thunder
- 2022–2024: →Oklahoma City Blue
- 2024–2025: Golden State Warriors
- 2025: Detroit Pistons
- 2025–2026: San Antonio Spurs
- 2026–present: Beijing Ducks

Career highlights
- NBA G League champion (2024)
- Stats at NBA.com
- Stats at Basketball Reference

Lindy Waters III (born July 28, 1997) is a Kiowa and Cherokee-American professional basketball player for the Beijing Ducks of the Chinese Basketball Association (CBA). He played college basketball for the Oklahoma State Cowboys. Waters entered the NBA in 2022 and has played for the Oklahoma City Thunder, the Golden State Warriors, and the Detroit Pistons as well as the Spurs. He was named a finalist for the NBA 2023–24 Social Justice Champion Award.

== Early life ==
Waters was born on July 28, 1997, to Lindy Waters Jr. and Lisa Waters. Waters is an enrolled citizen of the Kiowa tribe, and he is also of Cherokee Nation descent. His mother is of Cherokee and Irish descent, while his father is a full-blooded Native American.

Waters attended Norman North High School, helping the team reach the state title game.

In November 2015, Waters committed to playing college basketball for Oklahoma State.

== College career ==
During his freshman year, Waters sustained a concussion and a fractured foot that caused him to miss several games. He averaged 5.7 points per game on a team that reached the NCAA Tournament. As a sophomore, Waters averaged 8.7 points and 3.7 rebounds per game. In August 2018, he was named "Indian of the Year" by an Intertribal Council. Waters averaged 12.2 points, 4.2 rebounds, and 2.8 assists per game as a junior. As a senior, Waters averaged 10.5 points, 4.2 rebounds and 2.4 assists per game.

== Professional career ==
=== Enid Outlaws (2021) ===
After going undrafted in the 2020 NBA draft, Waters signed with the Enid Outlaws of The Basketball League on March 31, 2021. In 17 games, he averaged 12.6 points, 4.9 assists and 5.4 rebounds per game. On July 6, 2021, he signed with Palmer Alma Mediterránea of the LEB Oro. However, the contract was voided on August 14 due to bureaucratic problems.

=== Oklahoma City Thunder / Blue (2021–2024) ===
In October 2021, Waters joined the Oklahoma City Blue of the NBA G League after a successful tryout. That season, he played in 16 games for the Blue, averaging 11.4 points per game.

On February 10, 2022, Waters was signed to a two-way contract by his hometown team, the Oklahoma City Thunder. In the 2021-22 season, Waters competed in 25 games for the Thunder and averaged eight points per game.

On February 27, 2023, the Thunder converted Waters' deal into a multi-year standard contract. In the 2022-23 season, Waters played in 31 games for the Thunder and averaged 5.2 points per game. He also played in 13 games for the Blue and averaged 16.4 points per game.

On August 18, 2023, the Thunder re-signed Waters to a two-way contract after declining his team option. On February 9, 2024, he signed a multi-year contract with the Thunder. In the 2023-24 season, he played 38 games for the Thunder, averaging 3.6 points per game. He also played in three playoff games for the Thunder, but did not score. In addition, Waters played in 10 games for the Blue and averaged 21.8 points per game.

=== Golden State Warriors (2024–2025) ===
On June 27, 2024, the Golden State Warriors traded their 52nd pick in the 2024 NBA draft for Waters.

During a preseason game against the Los Angeles Clippers, Waters hit a game-winning buzzer beater on October 5, 2024. This was his first career buzzer-beating game winner.

On October 29, 2024, Waters scored a season-high 21 points and grabbed eight rebounds in the Warriors' blowout victory over the New Orleans Pelicans. For the season, Waters competed in 38 games for the Warriors and averaged 5.5 points per game.

=== Detroit Pistons (2025) ===
On February 6, 2025, Waters was traded to the Detroit Pistons in a five-team trade which sent Jimmy Butler to the Warriors. He played in 14 games for the Pistons, averaging 4.4 points per game.

=== San Antonio Spurs (2025–2026) ===
On July 24, 2025, the San Antonio Spurs announced they had signed Waters. That season, Waters played in 40 games for the Spurs and averaged 2.4 points per game.

=== Beijing Ducks (2026–present) ===
On September 15, 2026, Waters signed a one-year deal with the Beijing Ducks of the Chinese Basketball Association (CBA).

== Career statistics ==
Legend
GP	Games played	GS	Games started	MPG	Minutes per game
FG%	Field goal percentage	3P%	3-point field goal percentage	FT%	Free throw percentage
RPG	Rebounds per game	APG	Assists per game	SPG	Steals per game
BPG	Blocks per game	PPG	Points per game	**Bold**	Career high

=== NBA ===
==== Regular season ====
Year	Team	GP	GS	MPG	FG%	3P%	FT%	RPG	APG	SPG	BPG	PPG
2021–22	Oklahoma City	25	1	**18.6**	.406	.363	.800	**2.9**	1.0	**.8**	**.3**	**8.0**
2022–23	Oklahoma City	**41**	0	12.9	.393	.358	.800	1.8	.7	.3	**.3**	5.2
2023–24	Oklahoma City	38	0	7.4	**.471**	**.435**	**1.000**	1.1	.6	.1	.2	3.6
2024–25	Golden State	38	**9**	17.2	.371	.331	.727	2.5	**1.1**	.6	**.3**	5.5
2024–25	Detroit	14	0	8.8	.364	.395	–	1.0	.7	.4	.1	3.4
2025–26	San Antonio	40	0	7.1	.375	.342	.667	.7	.5	.2	.0	2.4
Career		196	10	11.9	.397	.363	.780	1.7	.8	.4	.2	4.6

==== Playoffs ====
Year	Team	GP	GS	MPG	FG%	3P%	FT%	RPG	APG	SPG	BPG	PPG
2024	Oklahoma City	3	0	3.0	.000	.000	—	.3	.0	.0	.0	.0
2026	San Antonio	**9**	0	**3.8**	**.462**	**.375**	—	**.7**	**.4**	**.2**	.0	**1.7**
Career		12	0	3.6	.429	.333	—	.6	.3	.2	.0	1.3

=== College ===
Year	Team	GP	GS	MPG	FG%	3P%	FT%	RPG	APG	SPG	BPG	PPG
2016–17	Oklahoma State	23	12	16.0	**.495**	.442	.714	1.8	.8	.6	.0	5.7
2017–18	Oklahoma State	**35**	31	27.1	.443	.373	.768	3.7	2.0	.9	**.4**	8.7
2018–19	Oklahoma State	32	**32**	**33.8**	.437	**.448**	**.878**	**4.2**	**2.8**	**1.3**	.2	**12.2**
2019–20	Oklahoma State	31	30	31.7	.381	.317	.825	**4.2**	2.4	1.2	.1	10.5
Career		121	105	27.9	.427	.390	.817	3.6	2.1	1.0	.2	9.5

== Off the court ==
Waters was named a finalist for the NBA 2023–24 Social Justice Champion Award for the work his foundation does to support Native American youth through sports, health and wellness.
