= 2023–24 NBA G League season =

American basketball season

- League: NBA G League
- Sport: Basketball
- Duration: November 10, 2023 – April 15, 2024
- Teams: 31

Draft
- Top draft pick: Jack White
- Picked by: Texas Legends

Regular season
- Top seed: Osceola Magic; Stockton Kings
- Season MVP: Mac McClung (Osceola Magic)
- Finals champions: Oklahoma City Blue
- Runners-up: Maine Celtics
- Finals MVP: Ousmane Dieng (Blue)

NBA G League seasons
- ← 2022–23 2024–25 →

The 2023–24 NBA G League season was the 23rd season of the NBA G League, the minor league basketball league of the National Basketball Association (NBA).

== Structure ==
The Showcase Cup started in November 2023 and concluded with a single-elimination tournament to crown a champion at the G League Winter Showcase in December. During the Showcase Cup, teams were separated into four regional pods and played 16 games against one another in each of the respective NBA G League markets. The teams with the best winning percentage in each regional pod, along with the next four teams across the league with the best win percentages, advanced to play for the Showcase Cup during the Winter Showcase, which was held from December 19 to December 22. The Westchester Knicks won the Showcase Cup Championship, defeating the Indiana Mad Ants.

The regular season schedule for all teams was released on September 5, which had each team scheduled to play 34 games. The Stockton Kings ended the regular season with the best record. The top six teams in each league advanced to the playoffs, with the top two seeds earning byes in the first round. The Oklahoma City Blue won the playoffs, defeating the Maine Celtics in the three-game final series.

== League changes ==
For the start of the 2023–24 season, the NBA G League added one new team, with two teams rebranding and relocating:

- Portland launched its new G League affiliate, the Rip City Remix, this season in Portland, Oregon, becoming the 31st NBA G League franchise.
- The Lakeland Magic moved within Florida from Lakeland to Kissimmee and became the Osceola Magic.
- The Fort Wayne Mad Ants rebranded as the Indiana Mad Ants and are playing home games at Gainbridge Fieldhouse in Indianapolis for the 2023–24 season, in anticipation of a move to a new arena in the suburb of Noblesville and a team rebrand in 2024–25.
- The Birmingham Squadron moved from the Western Conference to the Eastern Conference following the addition of Rip City.

=== International draft ===
The league held the first ever NBA G League International Draft on June 28, 2023. Returning player rights for ten NBA draft-eligible international players from ten different countries were selected by G League teams.

Pick	Player	Pos.	Country	Team
1	Malique Lewis	F	Trinidad and Tobago	Mexico City Capitanes
2	Sharif Barfi	G	Denmark	South Bay Lakers
3	Sediq Garuba	G	Spain	Salt Lake City Stars
4	Hassane Gueye	C	Senegal	Wisconsin Herd
5	Daryl Doualla	G	France	Capital City Go-Go
6	Abdullah Ahmed	C	Egypt	Westchester Knicks
7	Antonis Karagiannidis	C	Greece	Texas Legends
8	Jakub Urbaniak	C	Poland	Rip City Remix
9	Þorvaldur Orri Árnason	G	Iceland	Cleveland Charge
10	Ričards Vanags	F	Latvia	Rio Grande Valley Vipers

== Showcase Cup ==
=== Standings ===
==== Central ====
Pos	Team	W	L	PCT	GB
1	Indiana Mad Ants (IND)	15	2	.882	—
2	Motor City Cruise (DET)	9	7	.563	5.5
3	Windy City Bulls (CHI)	8	8	.500	6.5
4	Sioux Falls Skyforce (MIA)	8	8	.500	6.5
5	Iowa Wolves (MIN)	6	10	.375	8.5
6	Cleveland Charge (CLE)	6	10	.375	8.5
7	Grand Rapids Gold (DEN)	5	11	.313	9.5
8	Wisconsin Herd (MIL)	5	11	.313	9.5

Source: GLeague.NBA.com

==== East ====
Pos	Team	W	L	PCT	GB
1	Westchester Knicks (NYK)	13	4	.765	—
2	College Park Skyhawks (ATL)	10	6	.625	2.5
3	Delaware Blue Coats (PHI)	9	7	.563	3.5
4	Long Island Nets (BKN)	9	7	.563	3.5
5	Capital City Go-Go (WAS)	8	8	.500	4.5
6	Maine Celtics (BOS)	8	8	.500	4.5
7	Raptors 905 (TOR)	4	12	.250	8.5
8	Greensboro Swarm (CHA)	4	12	.250	8.5

Source: GLeague.NBA.com

==== South ====
Pos	Team	W	L	PCT	GB
1	Osceola Magic (ORL)	10	6	.625	—
2	Oklahoma City Blue (OKC)	10	6	.625	—
3	Birmingham Squadron (NO)	10	6	.625	—
4	Mexico City Capitanes	9	7	.563	1
5	Rio Grande Valley Vipers (HOU)	9	7	.563	1
6	Austin Spurs (SAS)	8	8	.500	2
7	Texas Legends (DAL)	6	10	.375	4
8	Memphis Hustle (MEM)	5	11	.313	5

Source: GLeague.NBA.com

==== West ====
Pos	Team	W	L	PCT	GB
1	Santa Cruz Warriors (GSW)	11	5	.688	—
2	Ontario Clippers (LAC)	10	6	.625	1
3	Salt Lake City Stars (UTA)	9	7	.563	2
4	South Bay Lakers (LAL)	8	8	.500	3
5	Rip City Remix (POR)	8	8	.500	3
6	Stockton Kings (SAC)	5	11	.313	6
7	NBA G League Ignite	4	12	.250	7

Source: GLeague.NBA.com

=== Showcase Cup Tournament ===
Quarterfinals; December 19
1	Indiana Mad Ants	113
8	Capital City Go-Go	102
4	Ontario Clippers	87
5	College Park Skyhawks	100
3	Santa Cruz Warriors	116
6	Motor City Cruise	112
2	Westchester Knicks	114
7	Mexico City Capitanes	104

Semifinals; December 20
1	Indiana Mad Ants	106
5	College Park Skyhawks	104
3	Santa Cruz Warriors	114
2	Westchester Knicks	127

Showcase Cup Championship; December 22
1	Indiana Mad Ants	99
2	Westchester Knicks	107

=== Statistics ===
Category	Player	Team(s)	Statistic
Points per game	Cam Whitmore	Rio Grande Valley Vipers	26.2
Rebounds per game	Oscar Tshiebwe	Indiana Mad Ants	16.0
Assists per game	Markquis Nowell	Raptors 905	10.2
Steals per game	Colby Jones	Stockton Kings	2.7
Blocks per game	Greg Brown III	Texas Legends	3.6

Source: NBA G League Statistics

== Standings ==
=== Eastern Conference ===
Pos	Team	W	L	PCT	GB
1	Osceola Magic (ORL)	22	12	.647	—
2	Maine Celtics (BOS)	21	13	.618	1
3	Indiana Mad Ants (IND)	21	13	.618	1
4	Capital City Go-Go (WAS)	20	14	.588	2
5	Long Island Nets (BKN)	19	15	.559	3
6	Delaware Blue Coats (PHI)	19	15	.559	3
7	Wisconsin Herd (MIL)	17	17	.500	5
8	College Park Skyhawks (ATL)	17	17	.500	5
9	Motor City Cruise (DET)	16	18	.471	6
10	Birmingham Squadron (NO)	15	19	.441	7
11	Cleveland Charge (CLE)	15	19	.441	7
12	Greensboro Swarm (CHA)	15	19	.441	7
13	Windy City Bulls (CHI)	15	19	.441	7
14	Raptors 905 (TOR)	13	21	.382	9
15	Westchester Knicks (NYK)	12	22	.353	10
16	Grand Rapids Gold (DEN)	11	23	.324	11

Source: GLeague.NBA.com

=== Western Conference ===
Pos	Team	W	L	PCT	GB
1	Stockton Kings (SAC)	24	10	.706	—
2	Sioux Falls Skyforce (MIA)	22	12	.647	2
3	Oklahoma City Blue (OKC)	21	13	.618	3
4	Santa Cruz Warriors (GSW)	20	14	.588	4
5	Salt Lake City Stars (UTA)	20	14	.588	4
6	Rio Grande Valley Vipers (HOU)	20	14	.588	4
7	Austin Spurs (SAS)	20	14	.588	4
8	Mexico City Capitanes	19	15	.559	5
9	Texas Legends (DAL)	18	16	.529	6
10	Rip City Remix (PDX)	18	16	.529	6
11	South Bay Lakers (LAL)	18	16	.529	6
12	Memphis Hustle (MEM)	15	19	.441	9
13	Ontario Clippers (LAC)	15	19	.441	9
14	Iowa Wolves (MIN)	7	27	.206	17
15	NBA G League Ignite	2	32	.059	22

Source: GLeague.NBA.com

== Playoffs ==
- First Round: April 2
- Conference Semifinals: April 4 & April 5
- Conference Finals: April 7
- NBA G League Finals: April 9, April 12 and April 15

Conference Quarterfinals	Conference Semifinals
1	Osceola Magic	112
5	Long Island Nets	120
4	Capital City Go-Go	118
5	Long Island Nets	120
Eastern Conference
2	Maine Celtics	119
6	Delaware Blue Coats	112
3	Indiana Mad Ants	101
6	Delaware Blue Coats	123
1	Stockton Kings	112
4	Santa Cruz Warriors	109
4	Santa Cruz Warriors	113
5	Salt Lake City Stars	111
Western Conference
2	Sioux Falls Skyforce	93
3	Oklahoma City Blue	111
3	Oklahoma City Blue	126*
6	Rio Grande Valley Vipers	125

Conference Finals
5	Long Island Nets	77
2	Maine Celtics	99
1	Stockton Kings	107
3	Oklahoma City Blue	114

Finals; Best-of-three
2	Maine Celtics	106	89	100
3	Oklahoma City Blue	86	99	117

* denotes overtime

=== Finals boxscore ===
April 9, 2024
8:00 p.m. ET

Box Score

Oklahoma City Blue 86, Maine Celtics 106
Scoring by quarter: 14–33, 28–26, 19–25, 25–22
Pts: Jaden Shackelford 21; Rebs: Olivier Sarr 13; Asts: Ousmane Dieng, Jaden Shackelford 4	Pts: JD Davison 23; Rebs: Neemias Queta 13; Asts: JD Davison 12

Portland Exposition Building, Portland, Maine
Attendance: 2,417
Referees:
- #36 Tyler Ricks
- #77 Jenna Reneau
- #41 Tyler Mirkovich
- #34 Brent Haskill

April 11, 2024
8:00 p.m. ET

Box Score

Maine Celtics 89, Oklahoma City Blue 99
Scoring by quarter: 14–25, 32–30, 23–28, 20–16
Pts: Drew Peterson 29; Rebs: Neemias Queta 13; Asts: JD Davison 12	Pts: Lindy Waters III 27; Rebs: Olivier Sarr 9 Asts: Adam Flagler, Hunter Maldonado, Lindy Waters III 5 each

Paycom Center, Oklahoma City, Oklahoma
Attendance: 6,883
Referees:
- #41 Tyler Mirkovich
- #80 JD Ralls
- #34 Brent Haskil
- #73 Pat O'Connell

April 15, 2024
9:00 p.m. ET

Boxscore

Oklahoma City Blue 117, Maine Celtics 100
Scoring by quarter: 29–22, 34–18, 29–27, 25–33
Pts: Ousmane Dieng 25; Rebs: Olivier Sarr 13; Asts: Ousmane Dieng 4	Pts: JD Davison 22; Rebs: Drew Peterson 8 Asts: JD Davison 10
Oklahoma City wins series, 2–1

Portland Exposition Building, Portland, Maine
Attendance: 2,417
Referees:
- #36 Tyler Ricks
- #77 Jenna Reneau
- #80 JD Ralls
- #73 Pat O'Connell
