= Luka Šamanić =

Croatian basketball player (born 2000)

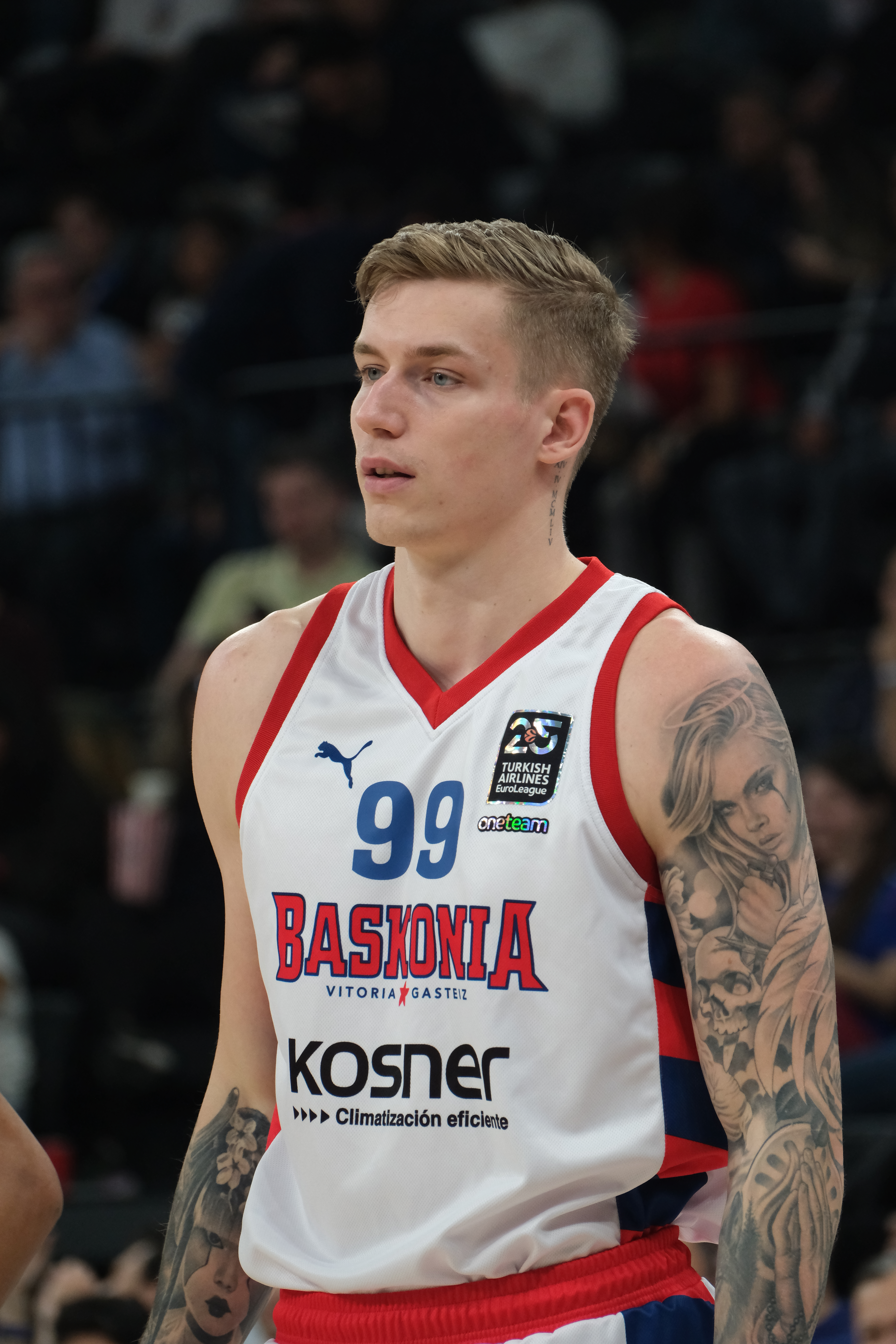
- Šamanić with Baskonia in 2025

No. 99 – UNICS Kazan
- Position: Power forward / center
- League: VTB United League

Personal information
- Born: 9 January 2000 (age 26) Zagreb, Croatia
- Listed height: 6 ft 10 in (2.08 m)
- Listed weight: 240 lb (109 kg)

Career information
- NBA draft: 2019: 1st round, 19th overall pick
- Drafted by: San Antonio Spurs
- Playing career: 2017–present

Career history
- 2017–2018: FC Barcelona B
- 2018–2019: Petrol Olimpija
- 2019–2021: San Antonio Spurs
- 2019–2021: →Austin Spurs
- 2021–2022: Westchester Knicks
- 2022–2023: Maine Celtics
- 2023–2024: Utah Jazz
- 2024: Cibona
- 2024–2025: Baskonia
- 2025–2026: Zenit Saint Petersburg
- 2026–present: UNICS Kazan

Career highlights
- All-NBA G League Second Team (2023); FIBA Europe Under-18 Championship B MVP (2017)
- Stats at NBA.com
- Stats at Basketball Reference
Medals
Men's basketball
Representing Croatia
FIBA Europe Under-18 Championship Division B
Gold medal – first place	2017 Estonia	National U-18 Team

Luka Šamanić (born 9 January 2000) is a Croatian professional basketball player for UNICS Kazan of the VTB United League. A power forward, he was drafted 19th overall by the San Antonio Spurs in the 2019 NBA draft.

A native of Zagreb, Šamanić started his youth career with the eponymous basketball club. In 2016, at age 16, he moved to Barcelona, Spain, where he joined the FC Barcelona's reserve team in the Spanish second-tier league. Šamanić has represented Croatia multiple times in FIBA events, leading his team to a gold medal at the FIBA Europe Under-18 Championship Division B in 2017, while earning most valuable player honors.

== Early life ==
Šamanić was born in Zagreb, Croatia. His father, Marko Šamanić, played basketball professionally for 19 years, including in the EuroLeague, with Slovenian club Krka. Due to his father's career, Šamanić lived in a number of countries in his early life. When he was nine months old, he moved to Belgium, and he later stayed in Slovenia and Germany.

Šamanić grew up playing a variety of sports, including football, handball, tennis, and was also involved in breakdancing. He did not start playing basketball, the last sport he attempted, until he was 11 years old. He credits his football experience for improving his coordination as a basketball player.

== Youth career ==
Šamanić began his basketball career at the youth levels with local club Zagreb. He collected 29 points, 10 rebounds, 4 steals, and 3 blocks for Zagreb in a 22 November 2014 win over the junior team for Šanac Karlovac. On 16 November, he recorded 43 points, 8 rebounds, and 7 steals for Zagreb to help defeat Samobor, 160–21. On 3 January 2016, Šamanić led his team to a championship win against Virtus Roma in a youth tournament in Italy, for which he earned most valuable player (MVP) honors. He scored 32 points on 16 January, in a blowout 111–43 win over the Rudeš junior team. Later in the month, Šamanić dominated versus the Cedevita junior team, notching 26 points, 10 rebounds, 4 steals, and 4 blocks. He continued his success on 22 February, when he erupted for 39 points and 21 rebounds in a 160–50 win over the junior team for Sisak. On 29 May, Šamanić was named MVP of the Croatian cadet championship after his double-double of 16 points and 11 rebounds in a blowout of Cibona junior squad. In June, he attended the Adidas EuroCamp, a three-day pre-National Basketball Association (NBA) draft camp for international prospects held in Treviso, Italy.

On 14 June 2016, Šamanić signed a 2-year amateur contract with Spanish club FC Barcelona, initially joining its junior ranks. On 22 December, he won the Slam Dunk Contest at a youth tournament in Tenerife. In January 2017, Šamanić played with Barcelona's junior team at the Ciutat de L'Hospitalet qualifiers for the 2016–17 Adidas Next Generation Tournament and was one year younger than most of his opponents at both events. In his first game at the qualifiers, on 6 January, he recorded 11 points and 5 rebounds in a 79–56 win over the Olimpija junior team. In the final tournament in May, Šamanić averaged 8.7 points, 6 rebounds, and 0.7 assists through 3 games, earning the Rising Star Trophy. Later that month, he won the Slam Dunk Contest at the EuroLeague FanZone, a three-day entertainment event at the 2017 EuroLeague Final Four.

By August 2017, Šamanić was drawing attention from several NCAA Division I programs, including Florida, Gonzaga, Purdue, and Stanford. In the 2017–18 season with Barcelona's junior team, he assumed a greater role after many of its top players left. In January 2018, Šamanić joined Barcelona at the Ciutat de L'Hospitalet qualifiers for the 2017–18 Adidas Next Generation Tournament. He posted 27 points, 16 rebounds, and 3 blocks on 7 January, as his team lost to the Joventut Badalona junior team in the championship. Still, Šamanić was named L'Hospitalet tournament MVP and earned All-Tournament Team honors after averaging 23.2 points, 14.8 rebounds, 3 assists, and 2.8 blocks through 4 games.

== Professional career ==
=== FC Barcelona B (2017–2018) ===
In the 2017–18 season, Šamanić competed for FC Barcelona Bàsquet B—the reserve team of FC Barcelona—in the LEB Oro, the second-tier Spanish league. He debuted on 1 October 2017, in a 76–69 win over Força Lleida, playing only 4 minutes. Šamanić stood out in his next game versus Cáceres, scoring 10 points in 20 minutes and performing a windmill dunk. On 4 November 2017, he scored 11 points in 19 minutes against Araberri. In his following appearance, Šamanić collected 10 points and 8 rebounds in a win over Peñas Huesca. He scored a season-high 17 points on 9 February 2018, leading his team past Palencia. Through 22 games, Šamanić averaged 5.1 points, 2 rebounds, and 0.7 assists in 12.7 minutes per game. In February 2018, he took part in a Basketball Without Borders camp in Los Angeles, joining several other international NBA prospects.

=== Olimpija (2018–2019) ===
On 31 May 2018, Šamanić signed a multi-year professional contract with Petrol Olimpija of the Slovenian League and ABA League. He joined Olimpija after failing to agree to terms with Croatian club Zadar. Šamanić debuted for Olimpija on 21 September in an 86–60 loss to Crvena zvezda at the 2018 ABA League Supercup, recording 2 points and 3 rebounds in 19 minutes. On 7 May 2019, he recorded season-high marks of 22 points and 11 rebounds in an 85–73 win over Šenčur in the Slovenian League. In late June 2019, Petrol Olimpija announced the departure of Šamanić.

=== San Antonio Spurs (2019–2021) ===
On 20 April 2019, Šamanić declared his entry into the 2019 NBA draft. He became one of a record-high 58 international prospects to declare entry that year. Šamanić later entered the 2019 NBA Draft Combine as one of 77 total participants. On 20 June 2019, Šamanić was the 19th pick of the 2019 NBA draft, after being selected by the San Antonio Spurs. On 1 July 2019, Šamanić officially signed with the Spurs. On 30 October 2019, Šamanić received his first assignment to the Austin Spurs, the affiliate team of the San Antonio Spurs in NBA G League.

On 13 August 2020, Šamanić recorded 16 points and 6 rebounds in a 112–118 loss to the Utah Jazz, on his first NBA game as a starter.

The Spurs waived Šamanić on 11 October 2021 as part of the final roster cuts before the 2021–22 NBA season.

=== Westchester Knicks (2021–2022) ===
On 16 October 2021, Šamanić was signed to a two-way contract by the New York Knicks. On 17 March 2022, he was waived without appearing in a game for New York.

=== Maine Celtics (2022–2023) ===
On 22 September 2022, Šamanić signed with the Boston Celtics. He was waived by the Celtics on 10 October. On 24 October 2022, Šamanić joined the Maine Celtics training camp roster.

=== Utah Jazz (2023–2024) ===
On 28 March 2023, Šamanić signed a 10-day contract with the Utah Jazz and on 7 April, he signed a multi-year deal.

On 5 August 2024, Šamanić signed with Fenerbahçe of the Turkish Basketbol Süper Ligi. On 10 September 2024, the club announced that Šamanić went home to Croatia for personal reasons, four days prior to the announcement. On 13 September 2024, Fenerbahçe followed up with the announcement that the club has terminated the contract of the player, by mutual consent, while still holding the rights for him for the 2024–25 Basketbol Süper Ligi season, thus ending his 40-day tenure with the club.

=== Cibona (2024) ===
In December 2024, Šamanić signed with Cibona of the ABA League and the Croatian League. This is the first time he will professionally play in his home country. Šamanić signed an open contract meaning he can transfer to another club for a more lucrative contract in any moment.

=== Baskonia (2024–2025) ===
On 30 December 2024 he signed 1+1 contract with Baskonia of the Liga ACB and the EuroLeague for the rest of the season. On 22 October 2025 Šamanić and his team terminated his contract due to personal reasons.

== Career statistics ==
Legend
GP	Games played	GS	Games started	MPG	Minutes per game
FG%	Field goal percentage	3P%	3-point field goal percentage	FT%	Free throw percentage
RPG	Rebounds per game	APG	Assists per game	SPG	Steals per game
BPG	Blocks per game	PPG	Points per game	**Bold**	Career high

=== NBA ===
==== Regular season ====
Year	Team	GP	GS	MPG	FG%	3P%	FT%	RPG	APG	SPG	BPG	PPG
2019–20	San Antonio	3	1	16.1	.313	**.375**	.750	3.3	2.0	.0	**.7**	5.3
2020–21	San Antonio	33	4	9.3	.448	.279	.552	2.1	.5	.2	.2	3.7
2022–23	Utah	7	4	**23.0**	**.456**	.258	.692	**4.3**	**2.1**	**.9**	.3	**9.9**
2023–24	Utah	**43**	**7**	9.4	.380	.203	**.786**	2.4	.4	.1	.2	4.1
Career		86	16	10.7	.411	.247	.706	2.4	.6	.2	.2	4.5

== National team career ==
Šamanić represents Croatia in FIBA competition. He made his national team debut at the 2016 FIBA Europe Under-16 Championship in Radom, Poland. On 16 August 2016, Šamanić recorded 17 points, 15 rebounds, 5 assists, and 9 blocks in a 74–67 victory over Sweden. In his final game at the event, he posted 24 points and 12 rebounds, shooting 4-of-9 from the three-point line, in a loss to Turkey. As Croatia finished in fourth place, Šamanić averaged 17.7 points, 10.4 rebounds, and 2.9 blocks per game, earning All-Star Five honors. In 2017, he played at the FIBA Europe Under-18 Championship Division B in Tallinn, Estonia. Šamanić led Croatia to a gold medal after recording 21 points, 8 rebounds, 4 steals, and 3 blocks in an overtime win over Great Britain. He was named tournament MVP and made the All-Star Five after averaging 13.3 points, 7.3 rebounds, 1.8 steals, and 1.6 blocks per game. Šamanić took part in the 2018 FIBA Europe Under-18 Championship in Latvia. On 3 August 2018, he notched 29 points, 10 rebounds, and 4 blocks, shooting 5-of-5 from the three-point line, to help defeat Ukraine. Even though Šamanić averaged 17 points, 7.7 rebounds, and 1.8 blocks per game in the tournament, Croatia finished in 11th place.

Even though being a free agent at the time, in November, 2024, Šamanić debuted for the senior national team. His first two games were against Bosnia and Herzegovina in the EuroBasket 2025 qualifiers.

== Personal life ==
Aside from Croatian, Šamanić speaks English and Spanish. Off of the basketball court, he likes to play football and table tennis.

Šamanić's basketball influences are former Croatian national player Toni Kukoč and American player Kevin Durant.
