= 2016–17 Euroleague Basketball Next Generation Tournament =

Adidas NGT
- Season: 2016–17
- Teams: 32

Regular season
- Season MVP: (France) Ivan Fevrier (Centre Fédéral)

Finals
- Champions: (France) Centre Fédéral
- Runners-up: (Serbia) Mega Bemax

The 2016–17 Euroleague Basketball Next Generation Tournament, also called Adidas Next Generation Tournament by sponsorship reasons, is the 15th edition of the international junior basketball tournament organized by the Euroleague Basketball Company.

As in past years, 32 teams joined the first stage, which are played in four qualifying tournaments between January and February 2017.

== Qualifying tournaments ==
=== Torneig de Bàsquet Junior Ciutat de L'Hospitalet ===
The Torneig de Bàsquet Junior Ciutat de L'Hospitalet was played between 6 and 8 January 2017.

==== Group A ====
Pos	Team	Pld	W	L	GF	GA	GD	Qualification	FCB	HGC	ALB	UOL
1	(Spain) FC Barcelona Lassa	3	3	0	228	176	+52	Qualification to semifinals	—	68–61	—	79–56
2	(Spain) Herbalife Gran Canaria	3	2	1	189	175	+14	Qualification to semifinals	—	—	—	68–53
3	(Germany) Alba Berlin	3	1	2	194	199	−5		59–81	54–60	—	—
4	(Slovenia) Union Olimpija	3	0	3	167	228	−61		—	—	58–81	—

Source: Adidas NGT
Rules for classification: 1) points; 2) Head-to-head; 3) Points difference; 4) Points scored.

==== Group B ====
Pos	Team	Pld	W	L	GF	GA	GD	Qualification	JOV	HOS	CED	PAO
1	(Spain) Divina Seguros Joventut	3	3	0	224	181	+43	Qualification to semifinals	—	—	70–57	—
2	(Spain) Torrons Vicens L'Hospitalet	3	2	1	213	196	+17	Qualification to semifinals	68–72	—	—	76–65
3	(Croatia) Cedevita	3	1	2	182	196	−14		—	59–69	—	66–57
4	(Greece) Panathinaikos Superfoods	3	0	3	178	224	−46		56–82	—	—	—

Source: Adidas NGT
Rules for classification: 1) points; 2) Head-to-head; 3) Points difference; 4) Points scored.

==== Semifinals ====
FC Barcelona Lassa (Spain)	71–54	(Spain) Torrons Vicens L'Hospitalet

Divina Seguros Joventut (Spain)	93–79	(Spain) Herbalife Gran Canaria

==== Classification games ====
Alba Berlin (Germany)	65–71	(Croatia) Cedevita

Union Olimpija (Slovenia)	64–53	(Greece) Panathinaikos Superfoods

==== Final ====
8 January 2017
19:00

Report

FC Barcelona Lassa (Spain)	74–58	(Spain) Divina Seguros Joventut
Scoring by quarter: 22–15, 21–16, 20–4, 11–23
Pts: Marjanović 23; Rebs: Šamanić 11; Asts: Velička 4 PIR: Marjanović 23		Pts: Galán 13; Rebs: González 7 Asts: Barros, Molins 3 PIR: Galán 14

Pavelló L'Hospitalet Nord, L'Hospitalet de Llobregat
Attendance: 800
Referees: David Hernández Prims (ESP), Pol Franquesa (ESP)

=== Kaunas Tournament ===
The Kaunas Tournament was played between 12 and 14 January 2017.

==== Group A ====
Pos	Team	Pld	W	L	GF	GA	GD	Qualification	PAR	LRY	FNB	SKY
1	(France) Centre Fédéral	3	2	1	239	178	+61	Qualification to the final	—	66–70	88–63	—
2	(Lithuania) Lietuvos Rytas	3	2	1	232	200	+32		—	—	68–69	—
3	(Turkey) Fenerbahçe	3	2	1	205	211	−6		—	—	—	73–55
4	(Germany) Fraport Skyliners	3	0	3	165	252	−87		45–85	65–94	—	—

Source: Adidas NGT
Rules for classification: 1) points; 2) Head-to-head; 3) Points difference; 4) Points scored.

==== Group B ====
Pos	Team	Pld	W	L	GF	GA	GD	Qualification	ZAL	CSK	CBA	VEF
1	(Lithuania) Žalgiris	3	3	0	233	180	+53	Qualification to the final	—	—	76–53	—
2	(Russia) CSKA Moscow	3	2	1	234	217	+17		68–83	—	—	87–60
3	(Spain) Canarias Basketball Academy	3	1	2	208	216	−8		—	74–79	—	81–61
4	(Latvia) VEF Rīga	3	0	3	179	242	−63		59–74	—	—	—

Source: Adidas NGT
Rules for classification: 1) points; 2) Head-to-head; 3) Points difference; 4) Points scored.

==== Classification games ====
Fraport Skyliners (Germany)	69–72	(Latvia) VEF Rīga

Fenerbahçe (Turkey)	59–83	(Spain) Canarias Basketball Academy

Lietuvos Rytas (Lithuania)	80–102	(Russia) CSKA Moscow

==== Final ====
14 January 2017
15:30

Report

Žalgiris (Lithuania)	62–57	(France) Centre Fédéral
Scoring by quarter: 19–15, 16–17, 18–8, 9–17
Pts: Jokubaitis 18; Rebs: Vasiliauskas 12; Asts: Jokubaitis 6 PIR: Jokubaitis 22		Pts: Ayayi 19; Rebs: Février 9 Asts: Maledon 7 PIR: Ayayi 19

Žalgiris Arena, Kaunas
Attendance: 750

=== Coín Tournament ===
The Coín Tournament was played between 10 and 12 February 2017.

==== Group A ====
Pos	Team	Pld	W	L	GF	GA	GD	Qualification	UNI	EST	USK	DDI
1	(Spain) Unicaja	3	2	1	211	206	+5	Qualification to the final	—	—	79–72	—
2	(Spain) Movistar Estudiantes	3	2	1	189	171	+18		59–65	—	58–39	—
3	(Czech Republic) USK Future Stars Praha	3	1	2	182	186	−4		—	—	—	—
4	(Turkey) Darüşşafaka Doğuş	3	1	2	191	210	−19		75–67	67–72	49–71	—

Source: Adidas NGT
Rules for classification: 1) points; 2) Head-to-head; 3) Points difference; 4) Points scored.

==== Group B ====
Pos	Team	Pld	W	L	GF	GA	GD	Qualification	RMB	BET	CIB	BAY
1	(Spain) Real Madrid	3	3	0	263	145	+118	Qualification to the final	—	—	—	72–61
2	(Spain) Real Betis Energía Plus	3	2	1	203	239	−36		48–88	—	72–69	—
3	(Croatia) Cibona	3	1	2	175	241	−66		36–103	—	—	70–66
4	(Germany) Bayern Munich	3	0	3	209	225	−16		—	82–83	—	—

Source: Adidas NGT
Rules for classification: 1) points; 2) Head-to-head; 3) Points difference; 4) Points scored.

==== Classification games ====
Darüşşafaka Doğuş (Turkey)	61–73	(Germany) Bayern Munich

USK Future Stars Praha (Czech Republic)	65–67	(Croatia) Cibona

Movistar Estudiantes (Spain)	68–56	(Spain) Real Betis Energía Plus

==== Final ====
12 February 2017
15:00

Boxscore

Unicaja (Spain)	60–72	(Spain) Real Madrid
Scoring by quarter: 15–14, 17–16, 11–21, 17–21
Pts: Stilma 13; Rebs: Rosa 7 Asts: García 4 PIR: Carralero 16		Pts: Radončić 37; Rebs: Radončić 7 Asts: Radončić 3 PIR: Radončić 37

Polideportivo Municipal, Coín
Attendance: 600

=== Belgrade Tournament ===
The Belgrade Tournament was played between 24 and 26 February 2017.

==== Group A ====
Pos	Team	Pld	W	L	GF	GA	GD	Qualification	CZV	PBA	STE	PAR
1	(Serbia) Crvena zvezda mts	3	3	0	241	175	+66	Qualification to the final	—	79–57	77–62	85–56
2	(Germany) Porsche Basketball Academy	3	2	1	203	202	+1		—	—	71–56	75–67
3	(Italy) Stella Azzurra	3	1	2	190	213	−23		—	—	—	—
4	(Serbia) Partizan NIS	3	0	3	188	232	−44		—	—	65–72	—

Source: Adidas NGT
Rules for classification: 1) points; 2) Head-to-head; 3) Points difference; 4) Points scored.

==== Group B ====
Pos	Team	Pld	W	L	GF	GA	GD	Qualification	MEG	SPA	BET	MTA
1	(Serbia) Mega Bemax	3	3	0	244	179	+65	Qualification to the final	—	68–40	82–63	94–76
2	(Bosnia and Herzegovina) Spars Ziraat Bank Sarajevo	3	1	2	173	197	−24		—	—	46–54	87–75
3	(Czech Republic) Get Better Academy	3	1	2	182	201	−19		—	—	—	—
4	(Israel) Maccabi Teddy Tel Aviv	3	1	2	224	246	−22		—	—	73–65	—

Source: Adidas NGT
Rules for classification: 1) points; 2) Head-to-head; 3) Points difference; 4) Points scored.

==== Classification games ====
Partizan NIS (Serbia)	73–81	(Israel) Maccabi Teddy Tel Aviv

Stella Azzurra (Italy)	78–69	(Czech Republic) Get Better Academy

Porsche Basketball Academy (Germany)	82–59	(Bosnia and Herzegovina) Spars Ziraat Bank Sarajevo

==== Final ====
26 February 2017
17:00

Boxscore

Crvena zvezda mts (Serbia)	74–61	(Serbia) Mega Bemax
Scoring by quarter: 28–8, 17–17, 13–21, 16–15
Pts: Đorđević 21; Rebs: three players 5 Asts: Uskoković 6 PIR: Đorđević 24		Pts: Bitadze 21; Rebs: Bitadze 18; Asts: Virijević 5 PIR: Bitadze 31

Železnik Hall, Belgrade
Attendance: 1,600

== Final Tournament ==
The Final Tournament will be played between 18 and 21 May 2017 in Istanbul, Turkey.

=== Teams ===
Host	Qualified teams	Invited teams
(Turkey) Fenerbahçe	(Spain) FC Barcelona Lassa (Lithuania) Žalgiris (Spain) Real Madrid (Serbia) Crvena zvezda mts	(France) Centre Fédéral (Russia) CSKA Moscow (Serbia) Mega Bemax

=== Group A ===
Pos	Team	Pld	W	L	GF	GA	GD	Qualification	CFE	CSK	BAR	CZV
1	(France) Centre Fédéral	3	3	0	235	189	+46	Qualification to the final	—	73–61	85–66	77–62
2	(Russia) CSKA Moscow	3	2	1	235	241	−6		—	—	90–88	—
3	(Spain) FC Barcelona Lassa	3	1	2	241	241	0		—	—	—	—
4	(Serbia) Crvena zvezda mts	3	0	3	208	248	−40		—	80–84	66–87	—

Source: Adidas NGT
Rules for classification: 1) points; 2) Head-to-head; 3) Points difference; 4) Points scored.

=== Group B ===
Pos	Team	Pld	W	L	GF	GA	GD	Qualification	MEG	RMB	FNB	ZAL
1	(Serbia) Mega Bemax	3	3	0	224	210	+14	Qualification to the final	—	75–65	—	—
2	(Spain) Real Madrid	3	2	1	210	188	+22		—	—	82–64	63–49
3	(Turkey) Fenerbahçe	3	1	2	210	219	−9		74–77	—	—	72–60
4	(Lithuania) Žalgiris	3	0	3	180	207	−27		71–72	—	—	—

Source: Adidas NGT
Rules for classification: 1) points; 2) Head-to-head; 3) Points difference; 4) Points scored.

=== Final ===
21 May 2017
10:00

Boxscore

Centre Fédéral (France)	65–58	(Serbia) Mega Bemax
Scoring by quarter: 19–17, 14–11, 8–18, 24–12
Pts: Février 17; Rebs: Briki 7 Asts: Briki, Blanc 5 PIR: Blanc 20		Pts: Bitadze 17; Rebs: Bitadze 20; Asts: Matić 4 PIR: Bitadze 38

Sinan Erdem Dome, Istanbul
Attendance: 325
Referees: Carlos Peruga (ESP), Josip Radojkovic (CRO), Torkild Rodsand (NOR)

=== Awards ===
MVP

- (France) Ivan Février (Centre Fédéral)

Rising star

- (Croatia) Luka Šamanić (FC Barcelona Lassa)

All-tournament team

- (France) Ivan Février (Centre Fédéral)
- (France) Yanik Blanc (Centre Fédéral)
- (Montenegro) Dino Radončić (Real Madrid)
- (Spain) Sergi Martínez (FC Barcelona Lassa)
- (Georgia (country)) Goga Bitadze (Mega Bemax)
