= 2019 NBA draft =

Basketball player selection

General information
- Sport: Basketball
- Date: June 20, 2019
- Location: Barclays Center (Brooklyn, New York)
- Networks: ESPN, Yahoo Sports

Overview
- 60 total selections in 2 rounds
- League: NBA
- First selection: Zion Williamson (New Orleans Pelicans)

The 2019 NBA draft was held on June 20, 2019. It took place at Barclays Center in Brooklyn, New York. National Basketball Association (NBA) teams took turns selecting amateur United States college basketball players and other eligible players, including international players. It was televised nationally on ESPN. State Farm was the presenting sponsor of the NBA draft for the eighth consecutive year. This draft was the first to feature a new weighted lottery system in which the three worst teams each had a 14 percent chance of winning the lottery; these teams were the New York Knicks, Cleveland Cavaliers, and Phoenix Suns. The lottery took place on May 14, during the NBA playoffs. Three of the four teams who held the top four picks of the draft this year rose up from at least six spots in the lottery, including the New Orleans Pelicans, who won the first pick with 6 percent odds. The Pelicans used that pick on Duke forward Zion Williamson. After Williamson, his college teammates R.J. Barrett and Cam Reddish were drafted in the top 10 as part of a talented Duke roster. This draft included the first Japanese player to be selected in the first round (Rui Hachimura), as well as the first Angolan player to be selected (Bruno Fernando).

== Draft selections ==
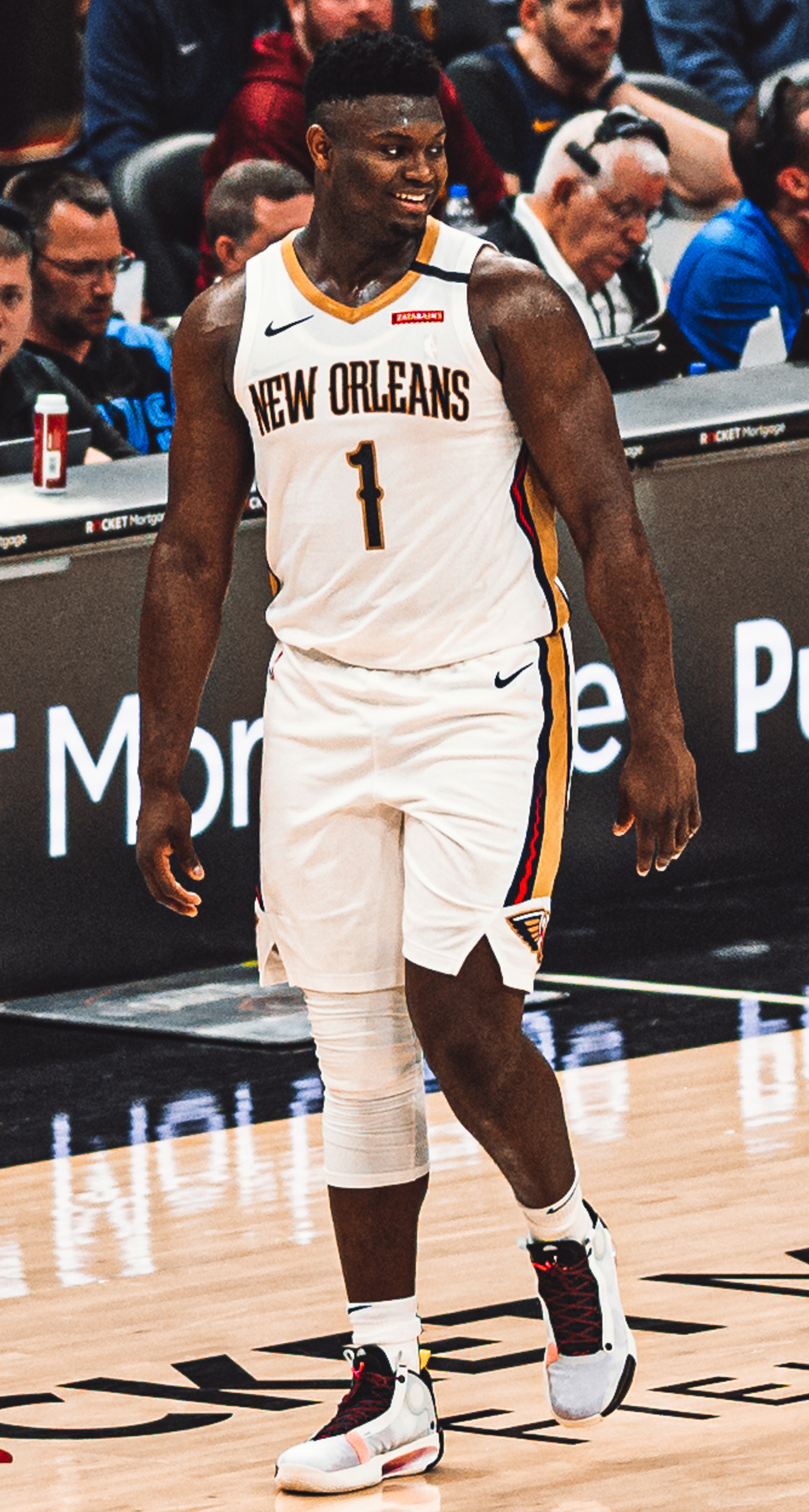
Zion Williamson was selected first overall by the New Orleans Pelicans. He is one of three Duke players drafted as lottery picks.

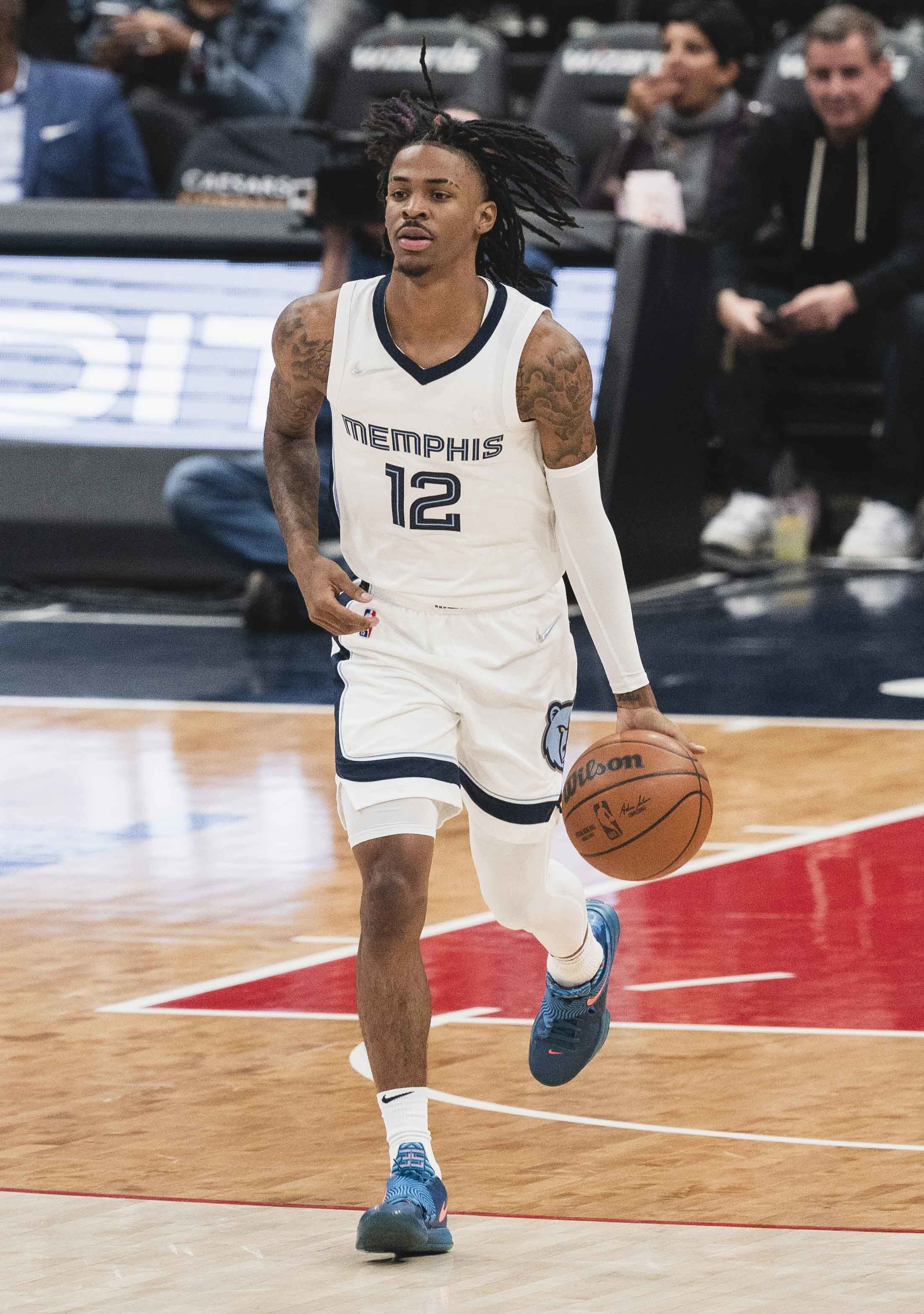
Ja Morant was selected second overall by the Memphis Grizzlies. He went on to win NBA Rookie of the Year honors for the 2019–20 season.

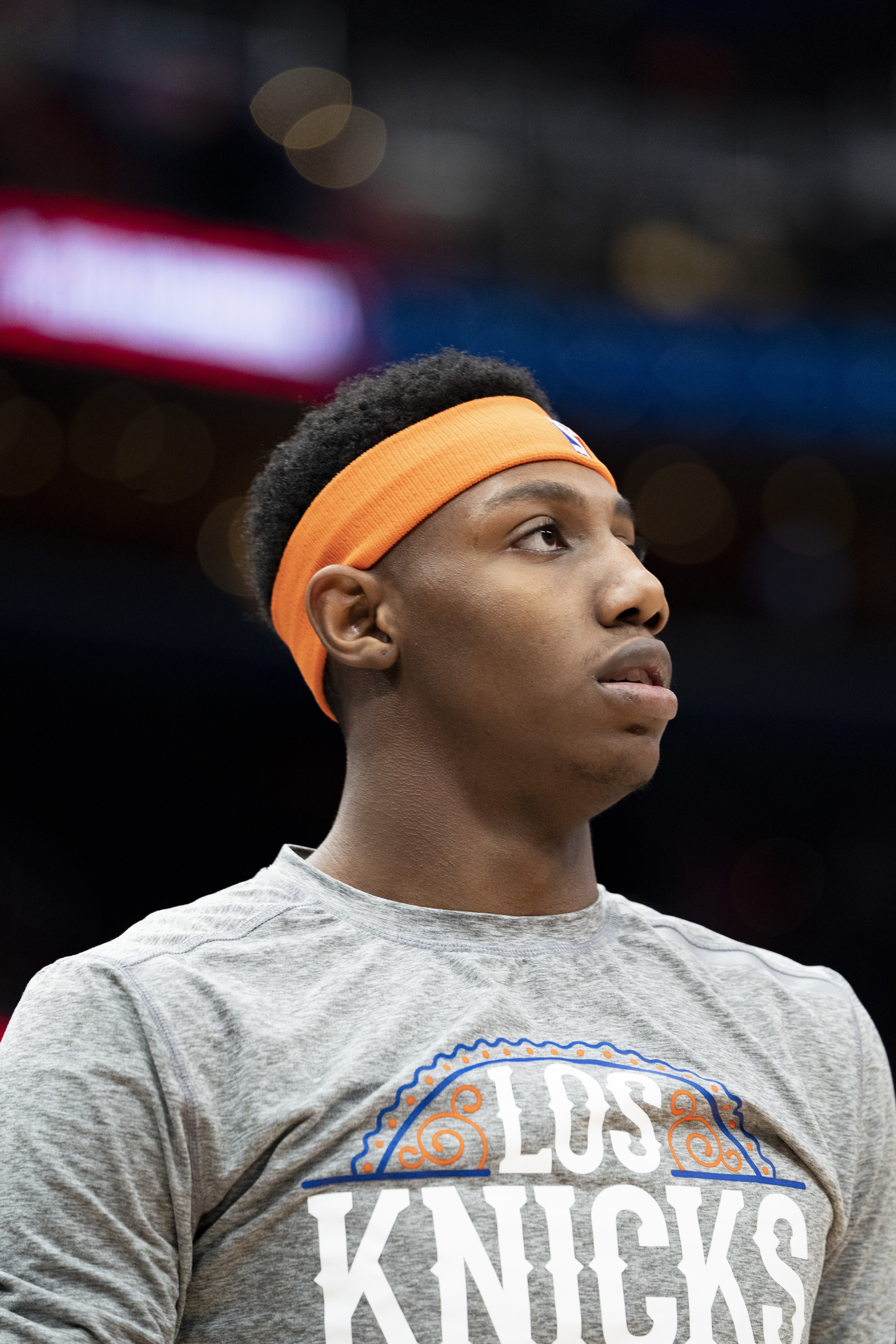
RJ Barrett, another Duke player, was selected third overall by the New York Knicks.

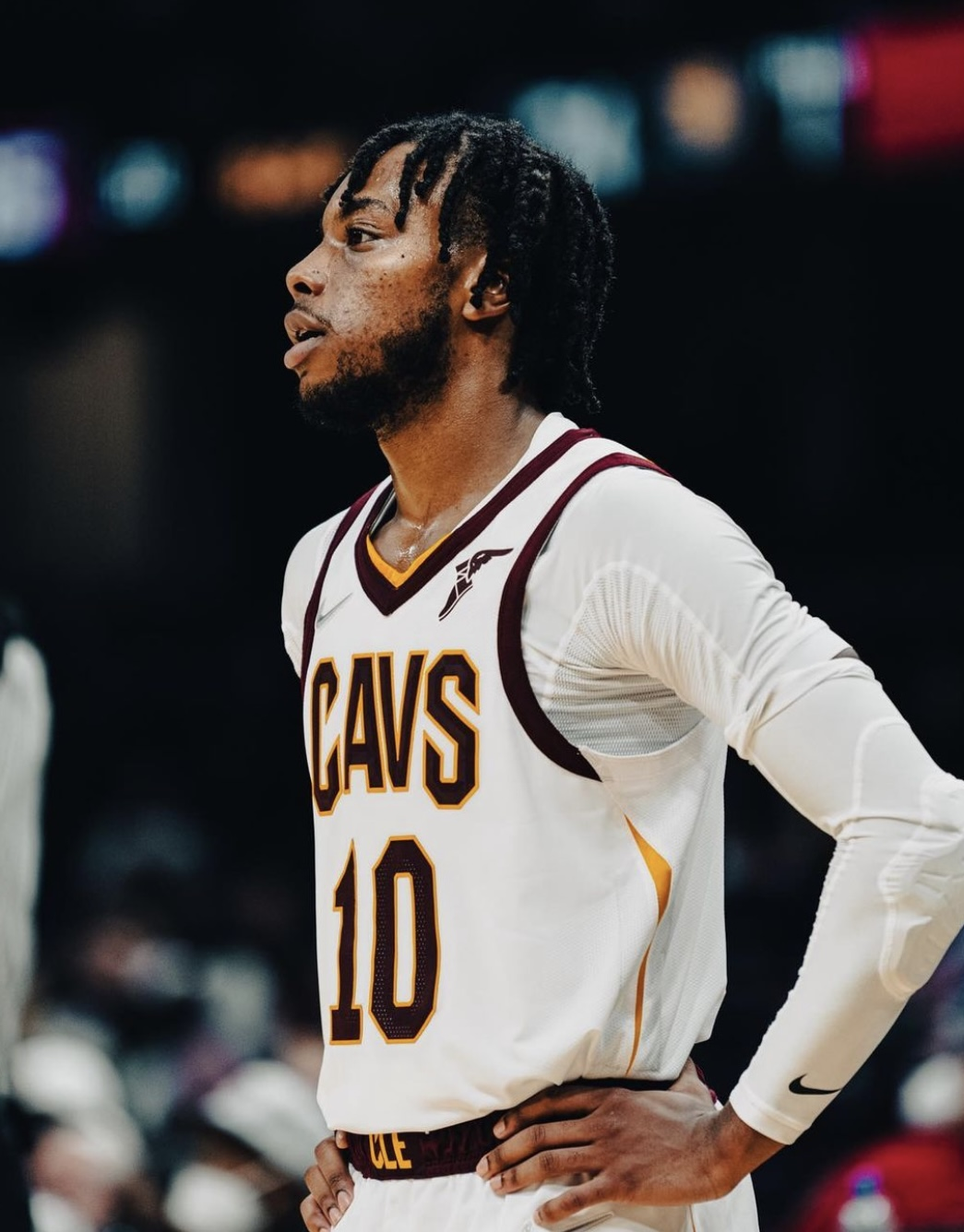
Darius Garland was selected fifth overall by the Cleveland Cavaliers.

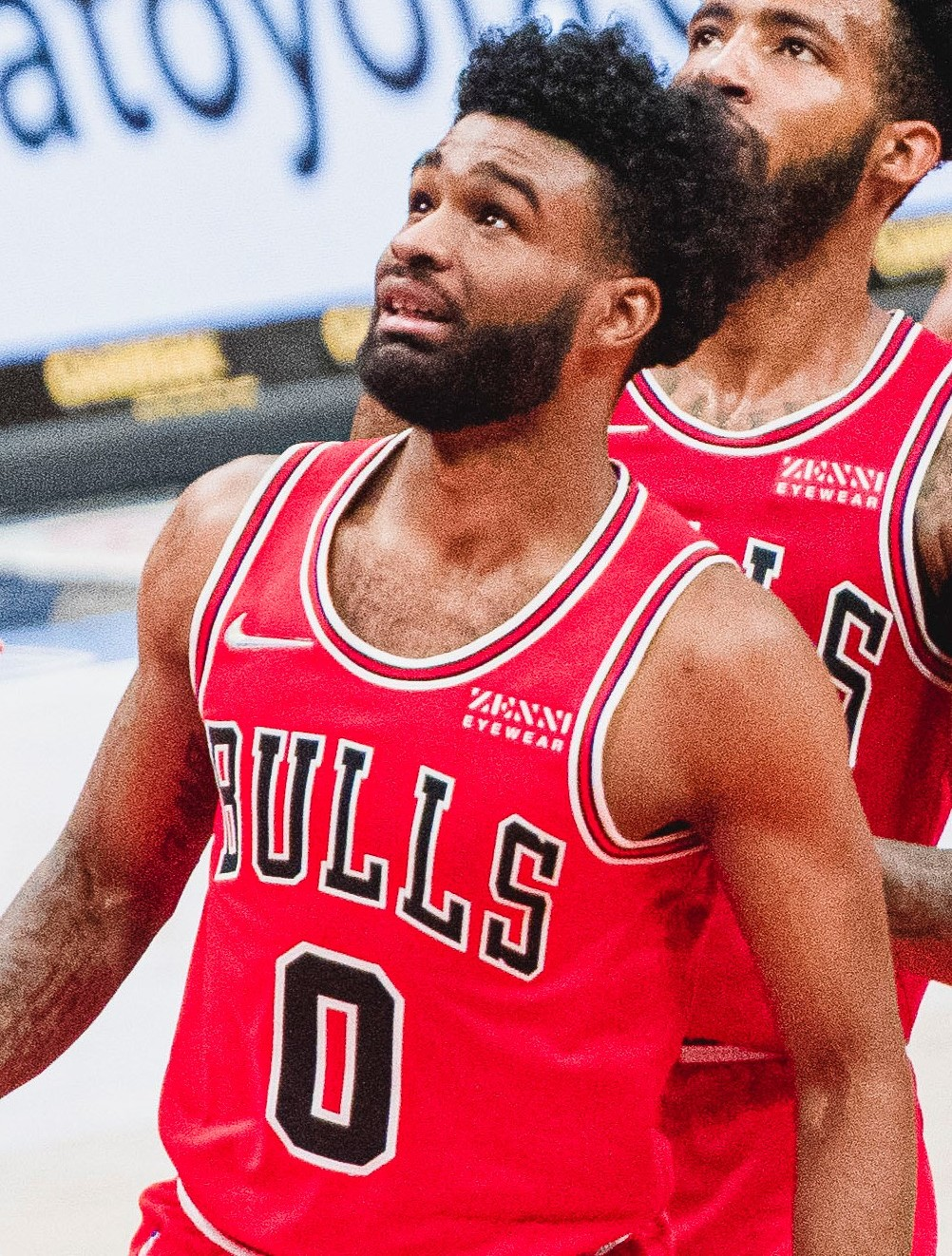
Coby White was selected seventh overall by the Chicago Bulls.

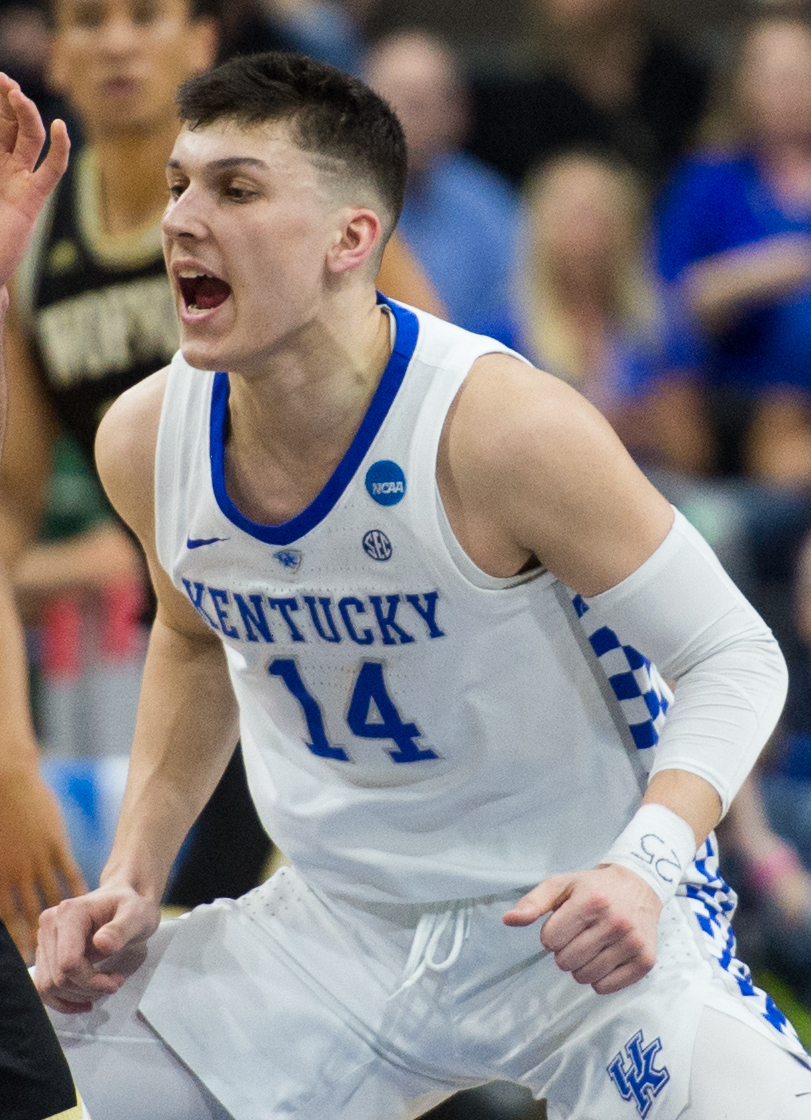
Tyler Herro was selected thirteenth overall by the Miami Heat.

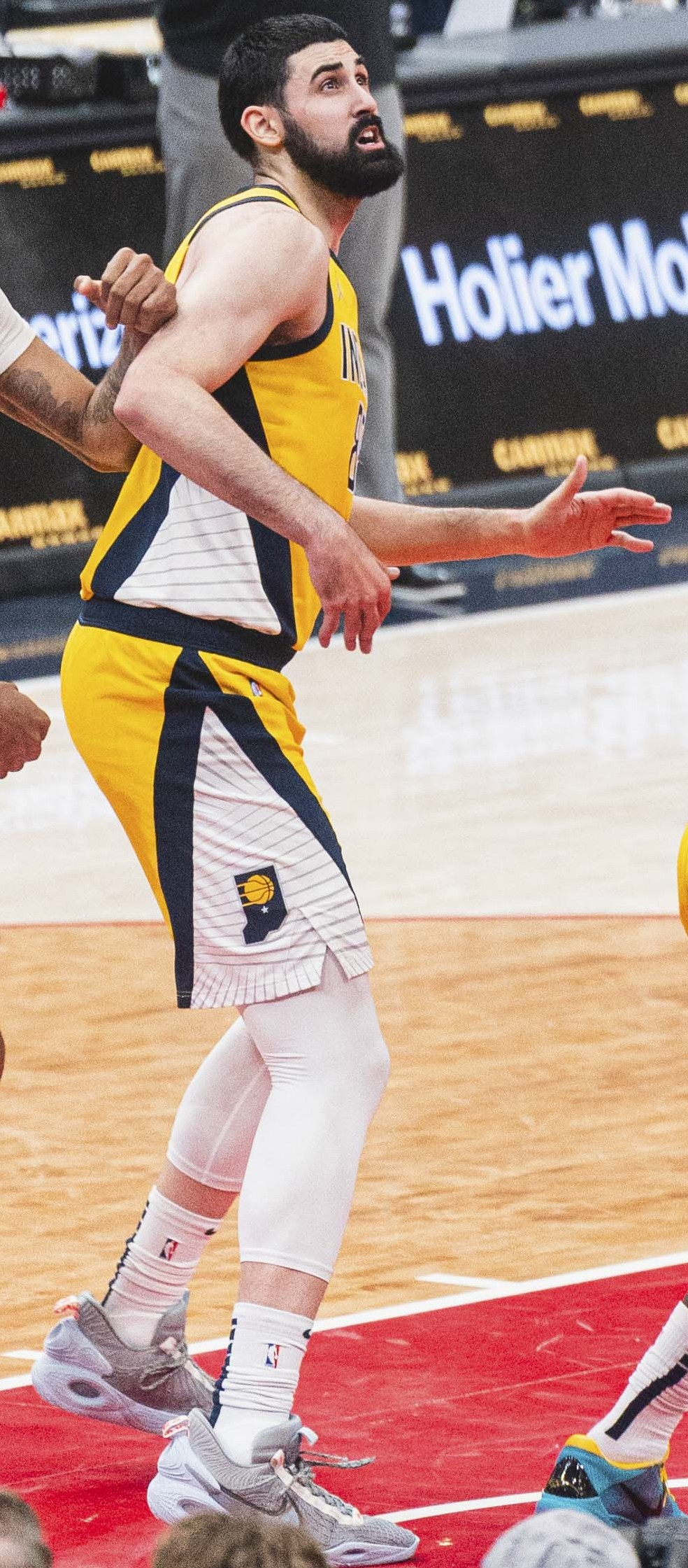
Goga Bitadze was selected eighteenth overall by the Indiana Pacers.

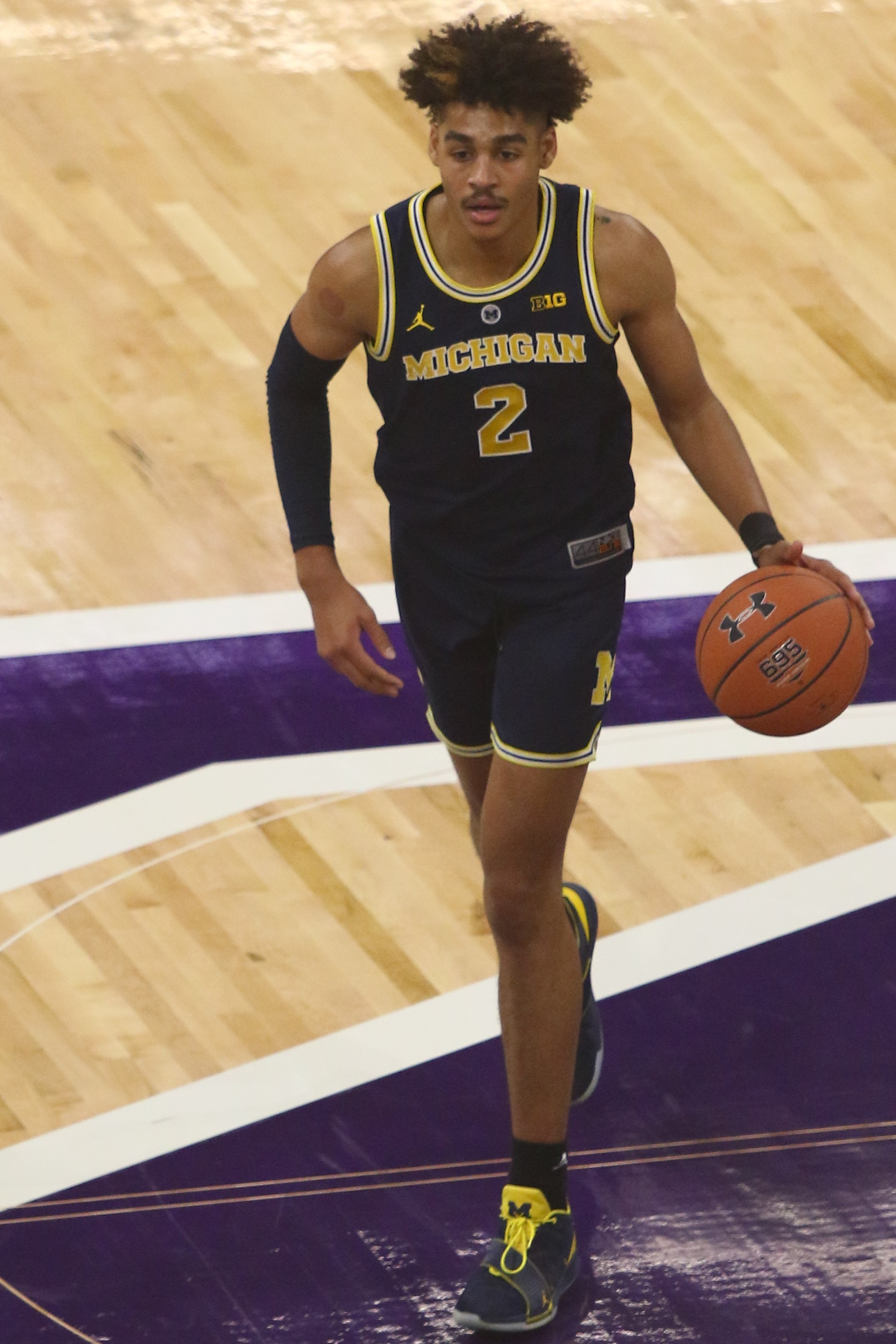
Jordan Poole was selected twenty-eighth overall by the Golden State Warriors.

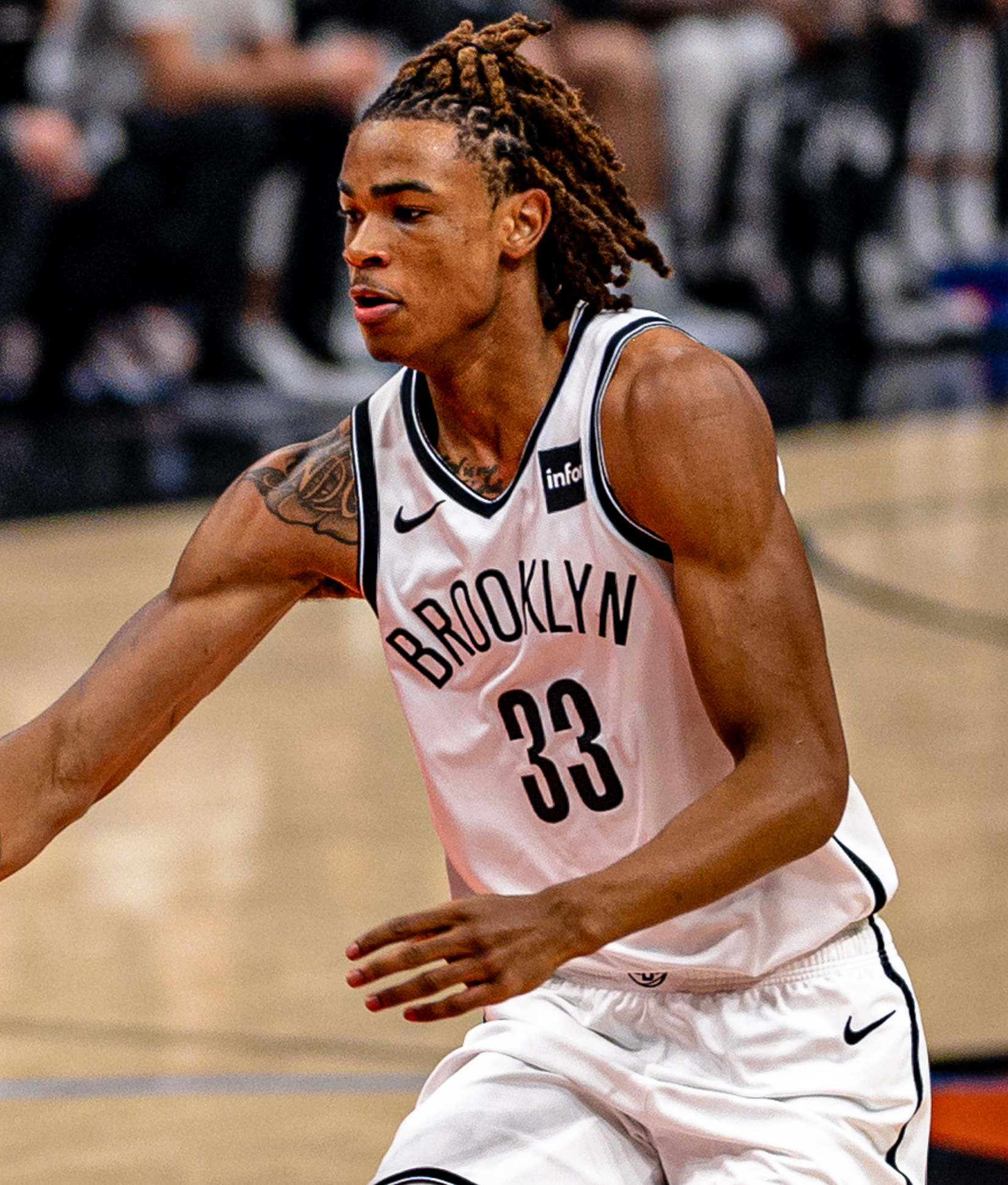
Nicolas Claxton was selected thirty-first overall by the Brooklyn Nets.

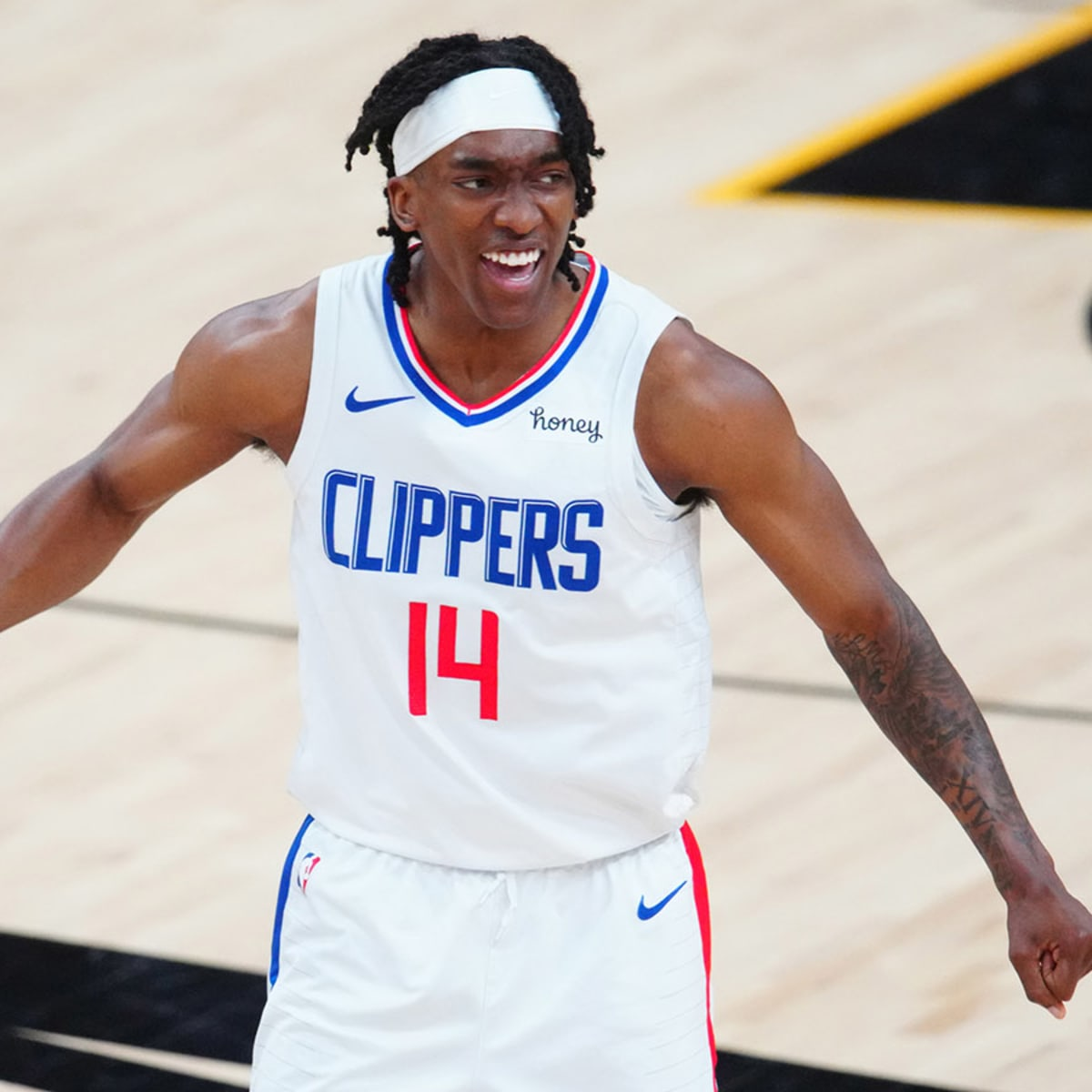
Terance Mann was selected forty-eighth overall by the Los Angeles Clippers.

PG	Point guard	SG	Shooting guard	SF	Small forward	PF	Power forward	C	Center

*	Denotes player who has been selected for at least one All-Star Game and All-NBA Team
^{+}	Denotes player who has been selected for at least one All-Star Game
^{x}	Denotes player who has been selected for at least one All-NBA Team
^{#}	Denotes player who has never appeared in an NBA regular-season or playoff game
^{~}	Denotes player who has been selected as Rookie of the Year

Rnd.	Pick	Player	Pos.	Nationality (Note: Nationality indicates the player's national team or representative nationality. If a player has not competed at the international level, then the nationality indicates the national team which the player is eligible to represent according to FIBA rules.)	Team	School / club team
1	1	Zion Williamson^{+}	PF	United States	New Orleans Pelicans	Duke (Fr.)
1	2	Ja Morant^{*~}	PG	United States	Memphis Grizzlies	Murray State (So.)
1	3	RJ Barrett	SG/SF	Canada	New York Knicks	Duke (Fr.)
1	4	De'Andre Hunter	SF	United States	Los Angeles Lakers (traded to Atlanta via New Orleans) (Note: July 6, 2019: Los Angeles Lakers to New Orleans Pelicans (three-team trade with Washington): Los Angeles Lakers acquired Anthony Davis; New Orleans acquired Brandon Ingram, Lonzo Ball, Josh Hart, a 2019 first-round pick, a 2021 protected first-round pick, the right to swap 2023 first-round picks, a 2024 first-round pick, and cash considerations.; Washington acquired Moritz Wagner, Isaac Bonga, Jemerrio Jones, and L.A. Lakers' 2022 second-round pick.) (Note: July 6, 2019: New Orleans Pelicans to Atlanta Hawks: Atlanta acquired a 2019 first-round pick (No. 4 - De'Andre Hunter), a 2019 second-round pick (No. 57 - Jordan Bone), Solomon Hill, and a conditional 2023 second-round pick; New Orleans acquired two 2019 first-round picks (No. 8 - Jaxson Hayes and No. 17 - Nickeil Alexander-Walker), a 2019 second-round pick (No. 35 - Didi Louzada), and a protected 2020 first-round pick)	Virginia (So.)
1	5	Darius Garland^{+}	PG	United States	Cleveland Cavaliers	Vanderbilt (Fr.)
1	6	Jarrett Culver	SG	United States	Phoenix Suns (traded to Minnesota) (Note: July 6, 2019: Phoenix Suns to Minnesota Timberwolves: Minnesota acquired a 2019 first-round pick (No. 6 - Jarrett Culver); Phoenix acquired a 2019 first-round pick (No. 11 - Cameron Johnson) and Dario Šarić)	Texas Tech (So.)
1	7	Coby White	PG	United States	Chicago Bulls	North Carolina (Fr.)
1	8	Jaxson Hayes	C	United States	Atlanta Hawks (traded to New Orleans)	Texas (Fr.)
1	9	Rui Hachimura	PF	Japan	Washington Wizards	Gonzaga (Jr.)
1	10	Cam Reddish	SF	United States	Atlanta Hawks (from Dallas) (Note: June 21, 2018: Dallas Mavericks to Atlanta Hawks: Atlanta acquired the draft rights to Trae Young and a protected 2019 first-round pick; Dallas acquired the draft rights to Luka Dončić)	Duke (Fr.)
1	11	Cameron Johnson	SF	United States	Minnesota Timberwolves (traded to Phoenix)	North Carolina (Sr.)
1	12	P. J. Washington	PF	United States	Charlotte Hornets	Kentucky (So.)
1	13	Tyler Herro^{+}	SG	United States	Miami Heat	Kentucky (Fr.)
1	14	Romeo Langford	SG	United States	Boston Celtics (from Sacramento via Philadelphia) (Note: July 10, 2015: Sacramento Kings to Philadelphia 76ers: Philadelphia acquired Nik Stauskas, Carl Landry, Jason Thompson, and a 2019 first-round pick; Sacramento acquired the draft rights to Artūras Gudaitis and Luka Mitrović; June 23, 2017: Philadelphia 76ers to Boston Celtics: Boston acquired a 2017 first-round pick (No. 3 - Jayson Tatum) and a 2019 first-round pick; Philadelphia acquired a 2017 first-round pick (No. 1 - Markelle Fultz))	Indiana (Fr.)
1	15	Sekou Doumbouya	SF	France (Note: Doumbouya was born in Guinea and raised in France. He has played for the France national under-19 basketball team.)	Detroit Pistons	Limoges CSP (France)
1	16	Chuma Okeke	PF	United States	Orlando Magic	Auburn (So.)
1	17	Nickeil Alexander-Walker	SG	Canada	Brooklyn Nets (traded to New Orleans via Atlanta) (Note: July 6, 2019: Brooklyn Nets to Atlanta Hawks: Atlanta acquired Allen Crabbe, a 2019 first-round pick, and a 2020 protected first-round pick; Brooklyn acquired Taurean Prince and a 2021 second-round pick)	Virginia Tech (So.)
1	18	Goga Bitadze	C	Georgia	Indiana Pacers	Mega Bemax (Serbia)
1	19	Luka Šamanić	PF	Croatia	San Antonio Spurs	Olimpija Ljubljana (Slovenia)
1	20	Matisse Thybulle	SF	Australia (Note: Thybulle was born in the United States and spent part of his childhood in Australia where he gained dual citizenship. He plays for the Australia national basketball team.)	Boston Celtics (from L.A. Clippers via Memphis; (Note: February 18, 2016: Los Angeles Clippers to Memphis Grizzlies: Memphis acquired Lance Stephenson and a 2019 first-round pick; Los Angeles Clippers acquired Jeff Green; June 23, 2016: Memphis Grizzlies to Boston Celtics: Boston acquired a 2019 first-round pick; Memphis acquired the draft rights to Deyonta Davis and Rade Zagorac) traded to Philadelphia) (Note: June 20, 2019: Boston Celtics to Philadelphia 76ers: Philadelphia acquired Boston's first-round pick (No. 20 - Matisse Thybulle); Boston acquired Philadelphia's first- and second-round picks (No. 24 - Ty Jerome and No. 33 - Carsen Edwards))	Washington (Sr.)
1	21	Brandon Clarke	PF	Canada; United States (Note: Clarke was born in Canada and raised in the United States; he holds dual citizenship of both countries but has not appeared in an international match.)	Oklahoma City Thunder (traded to Memphis) (Note: July 6, 2019: Oklahoma City Thunder to Memphis Grizzlies: Memphis acquired a 2019 first-round pick (No. 21 - Brandon Clarke); Oklahoma City acquired a 2019 first-round pick (No. 23 - Darius Bazley) and a 2024 second-round pick)	Gonzaga (Jr.)
1	22	Grant Williams	PF	United States	Boston Celtics	Tennessee (Jr.)
1	23	Darius Bazley	SF	United States	Utah Jazz (traded to Oklahoma City via Memphis) (Note: July 6, 2019: Utah Jazz to Memphis Grizzlies: Memphis acquired a 2019 first-round pick (No. 23), Grayson Allen, Kyle Korver, Jae Crowder, and a protected 2020 first-round pick; Utah acquired Mike Conley Jr.)	Princeton HS (Sharonville, Ohio; HS Sr.)
1	24	Ty Jerome	PG	United States	Philadelphia 76ers (traded to Boston; traded to Phoenix) (Note: July 6, 2019: Boston Celtics to Phoenix Suns: Phoenix acquired a 2019 first-round pick (No. 24 - Ty Jerome) and Aron Baynes; Boston acquired a protected 2020 first-round pick)	Virginia (Jr.)
1	25	Nassir Little	SF	United States	Portland Trail Blazers	North Carolina (Fr.)
1	26	Dylan Windler	SF	United States	Cleveland Cavaliers (from Houston) (Note: February 7, 2019: Houston Rockets to Cleveland Cavaliers (three-team trade with Sacramento): Cleveland acquired Brandon Knight, Marquese Chriss, Houston's 2019 first-round pick, and Houston's 2022 second-round pick; Houston acquired Nik Stauskas, Wade Baldwin IV, Iman Shumpert, and Cleveland's 2021 second round draft pick; Sacramento acquired Alec Burks and Houston's 2020 second-round pick)	Belmont (Sr.)
1	27	Mfiondu Kabengele	C	Canada	Brooklyn Nets (from Denver; (Note: February 7, 2019: Denver Nuggets to Brooklyn Nets: Brooklyn acquired Darrell Arthur, Kenneth Faried, a protected 2019 first-round pick, and a 2020 second-round pick; Denver acquired Isaiah Whitehead) traded to L.A. Clippers) (Note: June 20, 2019: Brooklyn Nets to Los Angeles Clippers: Los Angeles Clippers acquired Brooklyn's first-round pick (No. 27 - Mfiondu Kabengele); Brooklyn acquired the Los Angeles Clippers' second-round pick (No. 56 - Jaylen Hands) and a 2020 first-round pick)	Florida State (So.)
1	28	Jordan Poole	SG	United States	Golden State Warriors	Michigan (So.)
1	29	Keldon Johnson	SF	United States	San Antonio Spurs (from Toronto) (Note: July 18, 2018: Toronto Raptors to San Antonio Spurs: San Antonio acquired DeMar DeRozan, Jakob Poeltl, and a protected 2019 first-round pick; Toronto acquired Kawhi Leonard and Danny Green)	Kentucky (Fr.)
1	30	Kevin Porter Jr.	SG	United States	Milwaukee Bucks (traded to Detroit; (Note: June 20, 2019: Milwaukee Bucks to Detroit Pistons: Detroit acquired Tony Snell, and Milwaukee's first-round pick (No. 30 - Kevin Porter Jr.); Milwaukee acquired Jon Leuer) later traded to Cleveland) (Note: June 26, 2019: Detroit Pistons to Cleveland Cavaliers: Cleveland acquired the draft rights to Milwaukee's first-round pick (No. 30 - Kevin Porter Jr.); Detroit acquired a 2020, a 2021, a 2023 and a 2024 second-round picks)	USC (Fr.)
2	31	Nic Claxton	PF	U.S. Virgin Islands	Brooklyn Nets (from New York via Philadelphia) (Note: October 27, 2014: New York Knicks to Philadelphia 76ers: Philadelphia acquired Travis Outlaw and a 2019 second-round pick; New York acquired Arnett Moultrie; December 7, 2017: Philadelphia 76ers to Brooklyn Nets: Brooklyn acquired Jahlil Okafor, Nik Stauskas, and a 2019 second-round pick; Philadelphia acquired Trevor Booker)	Georgia (So.)
2	32	KZ Okpala	SF	Nigeria (Note: Okpala was born in the United States to Nigerian parents. He holds dual citizenship and plays for the Nigeria national basketball team.)	Phoenix Suns (traded to Miami) (Note: July 6, 2019: Phoenix Suns to Indiana Pacers (three-team trade with Miami): Miami acquired a 2019 second-round pick (No. 32 - KZ Okpala); Phoenix acquired cash considerations; Indiana acquired T. J. Warren, a 2022, a 2025, and a 2026 second-round picks)	Stanford (So.)
2	33	Carsen Edwards	PG	United States	Philadelphia 76ers (from Cleveland via New York and Orlando; (Note: January 5, 2015: Cleveland Cavaliers to New York Knicks (three-team trade with Oklahoma City): New York acquired Lou Amundson, Alex Kirk, Lance Thomas, and Cleveland's 2019 second-round pick; Cleveland acquired Iman Shumpert, J. R. Smith, and Oklahoma City's protected 2015 first-round pick; Oklahoma City acquired Dion Waiters) (Note: July 9, 2015: New York Knicks to Orlando Magic: Orlando acquired cash considerations and the right to swap 2019 second-round picks between New York and Orlando; New York Knicks acquired Kyle O'Quinn via a sign-and-trade deal) (Note: February 7, 2019: Orlando Magic to Philadelphia 76ers: Philadelphia acquired Jonathon Simmons, a 2020 first-round pick, and a 2019 second-round pick; Orlando acquired Markelle Fultz) traded to Boston)	Purdue (Jr.)
2	34	Bruno Fernando	C	Angola	Philadelphia 76ers (from Chicago via L.A. Lakers; (Note: July 7, 2016: Chicago Bulls to Los Angeles Lakers: Los Angeles Lakers acquired José Calderón and two future second-round picks; Chicago acquired the draft rights to Ater Majok; July 6, 2018: Los Angeles Lakers to Philadelphia 76ers: Philadelphia acquired cash considerations and a 2019 second-round pick; Los Angeles Lakers acquired Isaac Bonga) traded to Atlanta) (Note: July 6, 2019: Philadelphia 76ers to Atlanta Hawks: Atlanta acquired a 2019 second-round pick (No. 34 - Bruno Fernando); Philadelphia acquired a 2019 second-round pick (No. 57 - Jordan Bone) and two future second-round picks)	Maryland (So.)
2	35	Didi Louzada	SF	Brazil	Atlanta Hawks (traded to New Orleans)	Sesi/Franca (Brazil)
2	36	Cody Martin	SF	United States	Charlotte Hornets (from Washington via Atlanta, Denver, and Orlando) (Note: June 26, 2015: Washington Wizards to Atlanta Hawks (three-team trade with New York): Atlanta acquired Tim Hardaway Jr., a 2016 second-right pick, and a 2019 second-round pick; Washington acquired the draft rights to Kelly Oubre Jr.; New York acquired the draft rights to Jerian Grant; July 6, 2017: Atlanta Hawks to Denver Nuggets (three-team trade with L.A. Clippers): Denver acquired a 2019 second-round pick; Atlanta acquired Jamal Crawford, Diamond Stone, and Los Angeles' 2018 protected first-round pick; Los Angeles Clippers acquired Danilo Gallinari; July 21, 2018: Denver Nuggets to Orlando Magic: Orlando acquired the draft rights to Justin Jackson and a 2019 second-round pick; Denver acquired the draft rights to Jarred Vanderbilt; July 7, 2018: Orlando Magic to Charlotte Hornets (three-team trade with Chicago): Charlotte acquired Bismack Biyombo, a 2019 second-round pick, and a 2020 second-round pick; Orlando acquired Timofey Mozgov and Jerian Grant; Chicago acquired Julyan Stone)	Nevada (Sr.)
2	37	Deividas Sirvydis	SF	Lithuania	Dallas Mavericks (traded to Detroit) (Note: June 27, 2019: Dallas Mavericks to Detroit Pistons: Detroit acquired a 2019 second-round pick (No. 37 - Deividas Sirvydis); Dallas acquired a 2019 second-round pick (No. 45 - Isaiah Roby) and two future-second round picks)	Rytas Vilnius (Lithuania)
2	38	Daniel Gafford	C	United States	Chicago Bulls (from Memphis) (Note: January 3, 2019: Memphis Grizzlies to Chicago Bulls: Chicago acquired MarShon Brooks, Wayne Selden Jr., a 2019 second-round pick, and a 2020 second-round pick; Memphis acquired Justin Holiday)	Arkansas (So.)
2	39	Alen Smailagić	C	Serbia	New Orleans Pelicans (traded to Golden State) (Note: June 20, 2019: New Orleans Pelicans to Golden State Warriors: Golden State acquired New Orleans' second-round pick (No. 39 - Alen Smailagić); New Orleans acquired a 2021 second-round pick, a 2023 second-round pick, and cash considerations)	Santa Cruz Warriors (G League)
2	40	Justin James	SG	United States	Sacramento Kings (from Minnesota via Cleveland and Portland) (Note: June 25, 2015: Minnesota Timberwolves to Cleveland Cavaliers: Cleveland acquired the draft rights to Cedi Osman and Rakeem Christmas, and a 2019 second-round pick; Minnesota acquired the draft rights to Tyus Jones; July 27, 2015: Cleveland Cavaliers to Portland Trail Blazers: Portland acquired Brendan Haywood, Mike Miller, the more favorable 2019 second-round pick between Minnesota and L.A. Lakers, and a 2020 second-round pick; Cleveland acquired cash considerations; June 21, 2018: Portland Trail Blazers to Sacramento Kings: Sacramento acquired the more favorable 2019 second-round pick between Minnesota and L.A. Lakers, and a protected 2020 second-round pick; Portland acquired the draft rights to Gary Trent Jr.)	Wyoming (Sr.)
2	41	Eric Paschall	PF	United States	Golden State Warriors (from L.A. Lakers via Indiana, Cleveland and Atlanta) (Note: July 8, 2015: Los Angeles Lakers to Indiana Pacers: Indiana acquired a 2019 second-round pick; Los Angeles Lakers acquired Roy Hibbert; July 23, 2015: Indiana Pacers to Cleveland Cavaliers: Cleveland acquired a 2019 second-round pick; Indiana acquired Rakeem Christmas; October 14, 2017: Cleveland Cavaliers to Atlanta Hawks: Atlanta acquired Richard Jefferson, Kay Felder, the least favorable 2019 second-round pick between Minnesota and LA Lakers, a protected 2020 second-round pick, and cash considerations; Cleveland acquired the draft rights to Dimitrios Agravanis and Sergiy Gladyr; June 20, 2019 (prior to the draft): Atlanta Hawks to Golden State Warriors: Golden State acquired a 2019 second-round pick; Atlanta acquired a 2024 second-round pick and cash considerations)	Villanova (Sr.)
2	42	Admiral Schofield	SF	United States (Note: Schofield was born in the United Kingdom to American parents; his father was stationed there while he served in the United States Navy. Schofield was raised in the United States and holds American citizenship.)	Philadelphia 76ers (from Sacramento via Milwaukee and Brooklyn; (Note: July 12, 2013: Sacramento Kings to Milwaukee Bucks: Milwaukee acquired a 2016 second-round pick and the right to swap 2019 second-round picks between Sacramento and Milwaukee; Sacramento acquired Luc Mbah a Moute) (Note: June 30, 2014: Milwaukee Bucks to Brooklyn Nets: Brooklyn acquired a 2015 second-round pick and a 2019 second-round pick; Milwaukee acquired the rights to sign Jason Kidd as head coach; October 24, 2014: Brooklyn Nets to Philadelphia 76ers: Philadelphia acquired Marquis Teague and a 2019 second-round pick; Brooklyn acquired Casper Ware) traded to Washington) (Note: June 20, 2019: Philadelphia 76ers to Washington Wizards: Washington acquired Jonathon Simmons and Philadelphia's second-round pick (No. 42 - Admiral Schofield); Philadelphia acquired cash considerations)	Tennessee (Sr.)
2	43	Jaylen Nowell	SG	United States	Minnesota Timberwolves (from Miami via Charlotte) (Note: June 27, 2014: Miami Heat to Charlotte Hornets: Charlotte acquired the draft rights to P. J. Hairston and Semaj Christon, a 2019 second-round pick, and cash considerations; Miami acquired the draft rights to Shabazz Napier; February 10, 2015: Charlotte Hornets to Minnesota Timberwolves: Minnesota acquired Gary Neal and a 2019 second-round pick; Charlotte acquired Mo Williams and Troy Daniels)	Washington (So.)
2	44	Bol Bol	C	United States; South Sudan (Note: Bol was born in Sudan and raised in the United States; he holds dual South Sudanese-American citizenship but has not appeared in an international match.)	Miami Heat (from Charlotte via Atlanta; (Note: June 22, 2018: Charlotte Hornets to Atlanta Hawks: Atlanta acquired a 2019 second-round pick and a 2023 second-round pick; Charlotte acquired the draft rights to Devonte' Graham; June 19, 2019: Atlanta Hawks to Miami Heat: Miami acquired a 2019 second-round pick; Atlanta acquired a 2024 second-round pick and cash considerations) traded to Denver) (Note: June 20, 2019: Miami Heat to Denver Nuggets: Denver acquired Miami's second-round pick (no. 44 - Bol Bol); Miami acquired a future second round pick and cash considerations)	Oregon (Fr.)
2	45	Isaiah Roby	SF	United States	Detroit Pistons (from Detroit via Oklahoma City and Boston; (Note: February 19, 2015: Detroit Pistons to Oklahoma City Thunder (three-team trade with Utah): Oklahoma City acquired D. J. Augustin, Kyle Singler, and a 2019 second-round pick; Detroit acquired Reggie Jackson; Utah acquired a 2017 second-round pick; July 14, 2015: Oklahoma City Thunder to Boston Celtics: Boston acquired Perry Jones III, a 2019 second-round pick, and cash considerations; Oklahoma City acquired a 2018 second-round pick; July 7, 2017: Boston Celtics to Detroit Pistons: Detroit acquired Avery Bradley and a 2019 second-round pick; Boston acquired Marcus Morris) traded to Dallas)	Nebraska (Jr.)
2	46	Talen Horton-Tucker	SG	United States	Orlando Magic (from Brooklyn via Charlotte and Memphis; (Note: June 26, 2015: Brooklyn Nets to Charlotte Hornets: Charlotte acquired a 2018 second-round pick, a 2019 second-round pick, and cash considerations; Brooklyn acquired the draft rights to Juan Pablo Vaulet; February 16, 2016: Charlotte Hornets to Memphis Grizzlies (three-team trade with Miami): Memphis acquired P. J. Hairston, Chris Andersen, Charlotte's 2018 second-round pick, Charlotte's 2019 second-round pick, and two second-round picks from Miami; Charlotte acquired Courtney Lee and cash considerations; Miami acquired Brian Roberts; June 23, 2017: Memphis Grizzlies to Orlando Magic: Orlando acquired a 2019 second-round pick; Memphis acquired the draft rights to Ivan Rabb) traded to L.A. Lakers) (Note: June 20, 2019: Orlando Magic to Los Angeles Lakers: Los Angeles Lakers acquired Orlando's second-round pick (No. 46 - Talen Horton-Tucker); Orlando acquired a 2020 second-round pick and cash considerations)	Iowa State (Fr.)
2	47	Ignas Brazdeikis	SF	Canada (Note: Brazdeikis was born in Lithuania and raised in Canada where he gained citizenship. He played for Canada in youth tournaments. Brazdeikis had his Lithuanian citizenship restored in 2021 and he plays for the Lithuania national basketball team.)	Sacramento Kings (from Orlando via New York; (Note: July 14, 2017: New York Knicks to Sacramento Kings: Sacramento acquired a 2019 second-round pick and cash considerations; New York acquired the rights to hire Scott Perry as general manager) traded to New York) (Note: June 20, 2019: Sacramento Kings to New York Knicks: New York acquired Sacramento's second-round pick (No. 47 - Ignas Brazdeikis); Sacramento acquired New York's second-round pick (No. 55 - Kyle Guy) and cash considerations)	Michigan (Fr.)
2	48	Terance Mann	SF	United States	Los Angeles Clippers	Florida State (Sr.)
2	49	Quinndary Weatherspoon	SG	United States	San Antonio Spurs	Mississippi State (Sr.)
2	50	Jarrell Brantley	PF	United States	Indiana Pacers (traded to Utah) (Note: June 20, 2019: Indiana Pacers to Utah Jazz: Utah acquired Indiana's second-round pick (No. 50 - Jarrell Brantley); Indiana acquired a 2021 second-round pick and cash considerations)	Charleston (Sr.)
2	51	Tremont Waters	PG	Puerto Rico	Boston Celtics	LSU (So.)
2	52	Jalen McDaniels	PF	United States	Charlotte Hornets (from Oklahoma City) (Note: July 6, 2018: Oklahoma City Thunder to Charlotte Hornets: Charlotte acquired a 2019 second-round pick and cash considerations; Oklahoma City acquired the draft rights to Hamidou Diallo)	San Diego State (So.)
2	53	Justin Wright-Foreman	PG	United States	Utah Jazz	Hofstra (Sr.)
2	54	Marial Shayok	SG	Canada (Note: Shayok was born in Canada to Sudanese parents and played for Canada at youth tournaments. He was eligible for the South Sudan national basketball team and joined them in 2023.)	Philadelphia 76ers	Iowa State (Sr.)
2	55	Kyle Guy	SG	United States	New York Knicks (from Houston; (Note: February 19, 2015: Houston Rockets to New York Knicks: New York acquired Alexey Shved, a 2017 second-round pick, and a 2019 second-round pick; Houston acquired Pablo Prigioni) traded to Sacramento)	Virginia (Jr.)
2	56	Jaylen Hands^{#}	PG	United States	Los Angeles Clippers (from Portland via Orlando and Detroit; (Note: June 23, 2016: Portland Trail Blazers to Orlando Magic: Orlando acquired a 2019 second-round pick and cash considerations; Portland acquired the draft rights to Jake Layman; June 29, 2016: Orlando Magic to Detroit Pistons: Detroit acquired a conditional 2019 second-round pick; Orlando acquired Jodie Meeks; January 29, 2018: Detroit Pistons to Los Angeles Clippers: Los Angeles Clippers acquired Tobias Harris, Avery Bradley, Boban Marjanović, a 2018 protected first-round pick, and a 2019 second-round pick; Detroit acquired Blake Griffin, Brice Johnson, and Willie Reed) traded to Brooklyn)	UCLA (So.)
2	57	Jordan Bone	PG	United States	New Orleans Pelicans (from Denver via Milwaukee; (Note: February 23, 2017: Denver Nuggets to Milwaukee Bucks: Milwaukee acquired a protected 2019 second-round pick; Denver acquired Roy Hibbert; February 7, 2019: Milwaukee Bucks to New Orleans Pelicans (three-team trade with Detroit: New Orleans acquired Stanley Johnson, Jason Smith, and four future second-round picks; Milwaukee acquired Nikola Mirotić; Detroit acquired Thon Maker) traded to Detroit via Atlanta and Philadelphia) (Note: July 8, 2018: Philadelphia 76ers to Detroit Pistons: Detroit acquired a 2019 second-round pick (No. 57 - Jordan Bone); Philadelphia acquired a 2024 second-round pick and cash considerations)	Tennessee (Jr.)
2	58	Miye Oni	SG	Nigeria (Note: Oni was born in the United States to Nigerian parents; he also holds British citizenship. He plays for the Nigeria national basketball team.)	Golden State Warriors (traded to Utah) (Note: June 20, 2019: Golden State Warriors to Utah Jazz: Utah acquired Golden State's second-round pick (No. 58 - Miye Oni); Golden State acquired cash considerations)	Yale (Jr.)
2	59	Dewan Hernandez	PF	United States	Toronto Raptors	Miami (Jr.)
2	60	Vanja Marinković^{#}	SG	Serbia	Sacramento Kings (from Milwaukee)	Partizan Belgrade (Serbia)

Draft order and selections adapted from NBA website.

== Notable undrafted players ==
These players were not selected in the 2019 NBA draft, but have played at least one game in the NBA.

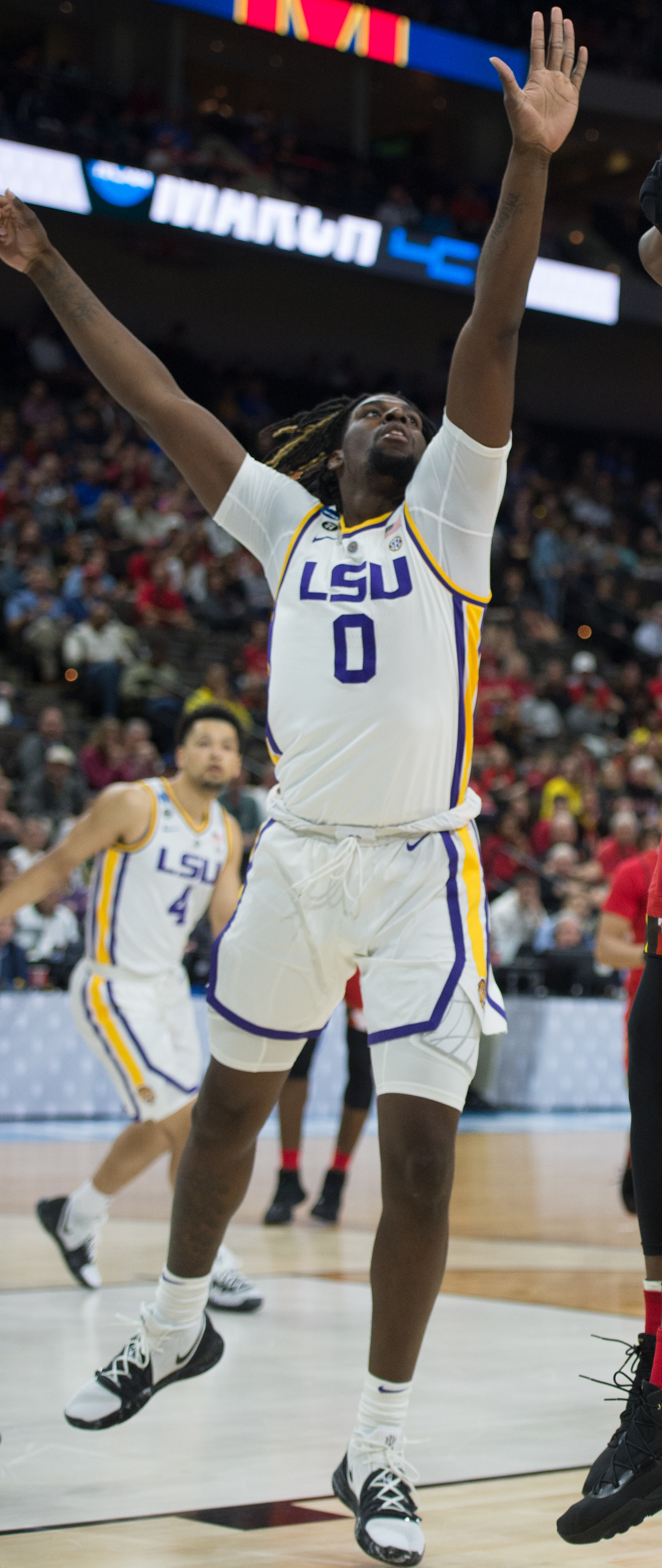
Naz Reid went undrafted and was selected as NBA Sixth Man of the Year in 2024.

Player	Pos.	Nationality	School/club team
Kyle Alexander	PF/C	Canada	Tennessee (Sr.)
Keljin Blevins	SG	United States	Montana State (Sr.)
Marques Bolden	C	United States (Note: Bolden became a naturalized Indonesian citizen in 2021 and plays for the Indonesia men's national basketball team.)	Duke (Jr.)
Brian Bowen	SF/SG	United States	Sydney Kings (Australia)
Ky Bowman	PG	United States	Boston College (Jr.)
Oshae Brissett	SF	Canada	Syracuse (So.)
Armoni Brooks	SG	United States	Houston (Jr.)
Charlie Brown Jr.	SF	United States	Saint Joseph's (So.)
Moses Brown	C	United States	UCLA (Fr.)
Shaq Buchanan	SG	United States	Murray State (Sr.)
Devontae Cacok	PF	United States	UNC Wilmington (Sr.)
Devin Cannady	PG	United States	Princeton (Sr.)
Ahmad Caver	PG	United States	Old Dominion (Sr.)
Zylan Cheatham	SF	United States	Arizona State (Sr.)
Chris Clemons	PG	United States	Campbell (Sr.)
Amir Coffey	SG	United States	Minnesota (Jr.)
Tyler Cook	PF	United States	Iowa (Jr.)
Terence Davis	SG	United States	Ole Miss (Sr.)
Luguentz Dort	SG	Canada	Arizona State (Fr.)
Tacko Fall	C	Senegal	UCF (Sr.)
Robert Franks	PF	United States	Washington State (Sr.)
Hassani Gravett	PG	United States	South Carolina (Sr.)
Donta Hall	PF/C	United States (Note: Hall became a naturalized Azerbaijani citizen in 2023.)	Alabama (Sr.)
Tyler Hall	SG	United States	Montana State (Sr.)
Jared Harper	PG	United States	Auburn (Jr.)
Jaylen Hoard	SF	France (Note: Hoard was born in France to an American father. He holds dual citizenship and played for France in junior tournaments.)	Wake Forest (Fr.)
DaQuan Jeffries	SG/SF	United States	Tulsa (Sr.)
Louis King	SF	United States	Oregon (Fr.)
John Konchar	SG	United States	Purdue Fort Wayne (Sr.)
Vic Law	SF	United States	Northwestern (Sr.)
Jalen Lecque	PG	United States	Brewster Academy (Wolfeboro, New Hampshire; HS Pg.)
Caleb Martin	SG/SF	United States	Nevada (Sr.)
Jeremiah Martin	PG	United States	Memphis (Sr.)
Garrison Mathews	SG	United States	Lipscomb (Sr.)
Jack McVeigh	PF	Australia	Nebraska (Jr.)
Adam Mokoka	SG	France	Mega Bemax (Serbia)
Matt Mooney	SG	United States	Texas Tech (Sr.)
Juwan Morgan	F	United States	Indiana (Sr.)
Zach Norvell Jr.	SG	United States	Gonzaga (So.)
Tariq Owens	F	United States	Texas Tech (Sr.)
Shamorie Ponds	PG	United States	St. John's (Jr.)
Jontay Porter	PF	United States	Missouri (So.)
Josh Reaves	SG	Bolivia (Note: Reaves was born in the United States to a Bolivian mother. He holds dual citizenship and plays for the Bolivia national basketball team.)	Penn State (Sr.)
Naz Reid	PF/C	United States	LSU (Fr.)
Justin Robinson	PG	United States	Virginia Tech (Sr.)
Chris Silva	PF	Gabon	South Carolina (Sr.)
Max Strus	SG	United States	DePaul (Sr.)
Rayjon Tucker	SG	United States	Little Rock (Jr.)
Dean Wade	PF	United States	Kansas State (Sr.)
Lindell Wigginton	SG	Canada	Iowa State (So.)

== Trades involving draft picks ==
=== Pre-draft trades ===
Prior to the day of the draft, the following trades were made and resulted in exchanges of draft picks between the teams below.

=== Draft-day trades ===
Draft-day trades were made on June 20, 2019, the day of the draft.

=== Post-draft trades ===
The following trades were reportedly agreed prior to and on the day of the draft and were completed at a later date. Due to salary cap reasons, most of these trades were officially announced on July 6, after the NBA moratorium period ended.

== Combine ==
The invitation-only NBA Draft Combine was held in Chicago from May 15 to 19. The on-court element of the combine took place on May 17 and 18. This year, 66 players were originally invited to the combine, including top prospects Zion Williamson and Ja Morant. The pool of participants also included Croatian Luka Šamanić, postgraduate Jalen Lecque, and Darius Bazley, who took a route similar to Mitchell Robinson with not playing in college or another league for a year before entering the draft. A couple of prospects also returned to the event after entering the previous year's combine, include an injury recovering Jontay Porter and Brian Bowen, a player who entered last year as a collegiate participant last year before heading off to play professionally in Australia this year. In addition, this year also introduced the NBA G League Elite Camp, which gave a certain number of draft hopefuls a chance to transfer into the NBA Draft Combine afterward. This year, eleven participants from that event joined the combine, increasing the number of total invites up to 77. One of the additional invites was Tacko Fall, who broke combine records for height (reaching 7 ft 7 in (2.31 m) with shoes on), wingspan, and standing reach.

== Draft lottery ==
External videos
- 2019 NBA Draft Lottery Drawing, NBA's official YouTube channel. May 14, 2019.

The NBA draft lottery took place during the Playoffs on May 14, 2019. This was the first year in which the new NBA draft lottery system is applied, where the draft lottery was expanded to the top four picks (rather than the top three); and where the three teams with the worst records had equal odds. Teams with better records had an increased chance for a top-four pick when compared to the previous system, which was what happened for the New Orleans Pelicans, Memphis Grizzlies, and Los Angeles Lakers this year.

Denotes the actual lottery result

Team	2018–19 record	Lottery chances	Lottery probabilities													
Team	2018–19 record	Lottery chances	1st	2nd	3rd	4th	5th	6th	7th	8th	9th	10th	11th	12th	13th	14th
New York Knicks	17–65	140	.140	.134	.127	.119	.479	—	—	—	—	—	—	—	—	—
Cleveland Cavaliers	19–63	140	.140	.134	.127	.119	.278	.200	—	—	—	—	—	—	—	—
Phoenix Suns	19–63	140	.140	.134	.127	.119	.148	.260	.071	—	—	—	—	—	—	—
Chicago Bulls	22–60	125	.125	.122	.119	.114	.072	.257	.168	.022	—	—	—	—	—	—
Atlanta Hawks	29–53	105	.105	.105	.105	.105	.022	.196	.267	.088	.006	—	—	—	—	—
Washington Wizards	32–50	90	.090	.092	.094	.096	—	.086	.296	.206	.038	.002	—	—	—	—
New Orleans Pelicans	33–49	60	.060	.063	.067	.072	—	—	.197	.372	.151	.016	.000	—	—	—
Memphis Grizzlies	33–49	60	.060	.063	.067	.072	—	—	—	.312	.341	.080	.005	.000	—	—
Dallas Mavericks	33–49	60	.060	.063	.067	.072	—	—	—	—	.464	.243	.029	.001	.000	—
Minnesota Timberwolves	36–46	30	.030	.033	.036	.040	—	—	—	—	—	.659	.190	.012	.000	.000
Los Angeles Lakers	37–45	20	.020	.022	.024	.028	—	—	—	—	—	—	.776	.126	.004	.000
Charlotte Hornets	39–43	10	.010	.011	.012	.014	—	—	—	—	—	—	—	.861	.090	.002
Miami Heat	39–43	10	.010	.011	.012	.014	—	—	—	—	—	—	—	—	.906	.046
Sacramento Kings	39–43	10	.010	.011	.012	.014	—	—	—	—	—	—	—	—	—	.952

1: Since the Memphis Grizzlies drew the second pick, it was not conveyed to the Boston Celtics.
2: Since the Dallas Mavericks drew outside the top 5, their pick was conveyed to the Atlanta Hawks.
3: Since the Sacramento Kings drew the 14th pick, it was conveyed to the Boston Celtics (if the Kings had drawn the 1st pick, it would have been conveyed to the Philadelphia 76ers, who would have in turn conveyed their 24th overall pick to the Celtics).

== Eligibility and entrants ==
The draft is conducted under the eligibility rules established in the league's 2017 collective bargaining agreement (CBA) with its players' union. The previous CBA that ended the 2011 lockout instituted no immediate changes to the draft but called for a committee of owners and players to discuss future changes.

- All drafted players must be at least 19 years old during the calendar year of the draft. In terms of dates, players who are eligible for the 2019 draft must be born on or before December 31, 2000.
- Since the 2016 draft, the following rules, as implemented by the NCAA Division I council for that division, are:
  - Declaration for the draft no longer results in an automatic loss of college eligibility. As long as a player does not sign a contract with a professional team outside the NBA, or sign with an agent, he will retain college eligibility as long as he makes a timely withdrawal from the draft.
  - NCAA players have until 10 days after the end of the NBA Draft Combine to withdraw from the draft. Since the combine is held in mid-May, the current deadline is about five weeks after the previous mid-April deadline.
  - NCAA players may participate in the draft combine and are allowed to attend one tryout per year with each NBA team without losing college eligibility.
  - NCAA players may enter and withdraw from the draft up to two times without loss of eligibility. Previously, the NCAA treated the second declaration of draft eligibility as a permanent loss of college eligibility.
- Starting this year, any undrafted underclassmen in the college system will have the opportunity to return to their college or university for at least one more season, provided they terminate their prior agreements with the agent they signed up with.

The NBA has since expanded the draft combine to include players with remaining college eligibility (who, like players without college eligibility, can only attend by invitation).

=== Early entrants ===
Players who are not automatically eligible have to declare their eligibility for the draft by notifying the NBA offices in writing no later than 60 days before the draft. For the 2019 draft, the date fell on April 21. After that date, "early entry" players are able to attend NBA pre-draft camps and individual team workouts to show off their skills and obtain feedback regarding their draft positions. Under the CBA a player may withdraw his name from consideration from the draft at any time before the final declaration date, which is 10 days before the draft. Under current NCAA rules, players had until May 29 (10 days after the draft combine) to withdraw from the draft and retain college eligibility.

A player who has hired an agent forfeits his remaining college eligibility when he is drafted. He can be represented beginning after any basketball season, following a request for an evaluation from the NBA Undergraduate Advisory Committee. From this draft on, players who declare for the NBA draft and are not selected have the opportunity to return to their school for at least another year, only after terminating all agreements with their agents.

==== College underclassmen ====
This year, 233 underclassed draft prospects (i.e., players with remaining college eligibility) had declared by the April 21 deadline, with 175 of these players being from college (including one American who went to a Canadian college) or were high school postgraduates. The names left over mean they have hired an agent, or have announced that they plan to do so before the night of the draft. At the end of the deadline, 86 players declared their intentions to enter the draft with an agent while 89 announced their return to college for at least one more season. By the end of the international underclassmen deadline, both Sacha Killeya-Jones and Kouat Noi removed their names from this year's draft while removing their collegiate eligibility as well, which left 84 total college underclassmen entering the draft.

- (Canada) Nickeil Alexander-Walker – G, Virginia Tech (sophomore)
- (Canada) RJ Barrett – F, Duke (freshman)
- (United States) Tyus Battle – G, Syracuse (junior)
- (Sudan) / (United States) Bol Bol – C, Oregon (freshman)
- (Indonesia) Marques Bolden – C, Duke (junior)
- (United States) Jordan Bone – G, Tennessee (junior)
- (United States) Ky Bowman – G, Boston College (junior)
- (Canada) Ignas Brazdeikis – F, Michigan (freshman)
- (Canada) Oshae Brissett – F, Syracuse (sophomore)
- (United States) Armoni Brooks – G, Houston (junior)
- (United States) Charlie Brown Jr. – F, Saint Joseph's (sophomore)
- (United States) Moses Brown – C, UCLA (freshman)
- (Canada) Brandon Clarke – F, Gonzaga (junior)
- (United States) / (United States Virgin Islands) Nic Claxton – F, Georgia (sophomore)
- (United States) Amir Coffey – G, Minnesota (junior)
- (United States) Tyler Cook – F, Iowa (junior)
- (United States) Jarrett Culver – G, Texas Tech (sophomore)
- (United States) Aubrey Dawkins – G, UCF (junior)
- (Canada) Luguentz Dort – G, Arizona State (freshman)
- (United States) Jason Draggs – F, Lee (freshman)
- (United States) Carsen Edwards – G, Purdue (junior)
- (Angola) Bruno Fernando – F, Maryland (sophomore)
- (United States) Daniel Gafford – F, Arkansas (sophomore)
- (United States) Darius Garland – G, Vanderbilt (freshman)
- (United States) Kyle Guy – G, Virginia (junior)
- (Japan) Rui Hachimura – F, Gonzaga (junior)
- (United States) Jaylen Hands – G, UCLA (sophomore)
- (United States) Jared Harper – G, Auburn (junior)
- (United States) Jaxson Hayes – F, Texas (freshman)
- (United States) Dewan Hernandez – F, Miami (junior)
- (United States) Tyler Herro – G, Kentucky (freshman)
- (United States) Amir Hinton – G, Shaw (junior)
- (France) Jaylen Hoard – F, Wake Forest (freshman)
- (United States) Daulton Hommes – G, Point Loma (junior)
- (United States) Talen Horton-Tucker – G, Iowa State (freshman)
- (United States) De'Andre Hunter – G, Virginia (sophomore)
- (United States) Ty Jerome – G, Virginia (junior)
- (United States) Keldon Johnson – G, Kentucky (freshman)
- (Canada) Mfiondu Kabengele – F, Florida State (sophomore)
- (United States) Louis King – F, Oregon (freshman)
- (United States) V. J. King – F, Louisville (junior)
- (Mali) Sagaba Konate – F, West Virginia (junior)
- (Slovenia) Martin Krampelj – F, Creighton (junior)
- (United States) Romeo Langford – G, Indiana (freshman)
- (United States) Cameron Lard – F, Iowa State (sophomore)
- (United States) Dedric Lawson – F, Kansas (junior)
- (United States) Jalen Lecque – G, Brewster Academy (postgraduate)
- (United States) Jacob Ledoux – G, UT Permian Basin (junior)
- (United States) Nassir Little – F, North Carolina (freshman)
- (United States) Trevor Manuel – G/F, Olivet (junior)
- (United States) Charles Matthews – G, Michigan (junior)
- (United States) Jalen McDaniels – F, San Diego State (sophomore)
- (United States) Ja Morant – G, Murray State (sophomore)
- (United States) Zach Norvell Jr. – G, Gonzaga (sophomore)
- (United States) Jaylen Nowell – G, Washington (sophomore)
- (United States) Chuma Okeke – F, Auburn (sophomore)
- (United States) KZ Okpala – F, Stanford (sophomore)
- (United States) Miye Oni – G, Yale (junior)
- (United States) Lamar Peters – G, Mississippi State (junior)
- (United States) Shamorie Ponds – G, St. John's (junior)
- (United States) Jordan Poole – G, Michigan (sophomore)
- (United States) Jontay Porter – C, Missouri (sophomore)
- (United States) Kevin Porter Jr. – G, USC (freshman)
- (United States) Brandon Randolph – F, Arizona (sophomore)
- (United States) Cam Reddish – G, Duke (freshman)
- (United States) Isaiah Reese – G, Canisius (junior)
- (United States) Naz Reid – F, LSU (freshman)
- (United States) Austin Robinson – G, Kentucky Christian (sophomore)
- (United States) Isaiah Roby – F, Nebraska (junior)
- (United States) Ayinde Russell – G, Morehouse (junior)
- (United States) / (Bosnia and Herzegovina) Samir Šehić – F, Tulane (junior)
- (Canada) Simisola Shittu – F, Vanderbilt (freshman)
- (United States) Justin Simon – G, St. John's (junior)
- (United States) D'Marcus Simonds – G, Georgia State (junior)
- (United States) Jalen Sykes – F, St. Clair (Canada; junior)
- (United States) Rayjon Tucker – G, Little Rock (junior)
- (United States) Nick Ward – F, Michigan State (junior)
- (United States) P. J. Washington – F, Kentucky (sophomore)
- (United States) / (Puerto Rico) Tremont Waters – G, LSU (sophomore)
- (United States) Coby White – G, North Carolina (freshman)
- (Canada) Lindell Wigginton – G, Iowa State (sophomore)
- (United States) Kris Wilkes – G, UCLA (sophomore)
- (United States) Grant Williams – F, Tennessee (junior)
- (United States) Zion Williamson – F, Duke (freshman)
- (United States) Kenny Wooten – F, Oregon (sophomore)

==== International players ====
International players that had declared this year and did not previously declare in another prior year can drop out of the draft about 10 days before the draft begins on June 10. By the April 23 deadline, a record-high 58 international prospects, including an international Canadian university player, expressed interest in the 2019 NBA draft. By the end of the international deadline on June 10, 46 of these players pulled their names out of the draft, leaving only 12 fully foreign players entering the NBA draft this year. For this year's draft, the total underclassmen left were 96 players.

- (Georgia (country)) Goga Bitadze – C, Mega Bemax (Serbia)
- Yago dos Santos – G, Paulistano Corpore (Brazil)
- Sekou Doumbouya – F, Limoges CSP (France)
- Matas Jogėla – G, Dzūkija Alytus (Lithuania)
- Didi Louzada – F, Sesi/Franca (Brazil)
- (Australia) William McDowell-White – G, Brose Bamberg (Germany)
- (France) Adam Mokoka – G, Mega Bemax (Serbia)
- Joshua Obiesie – G, s.Oliver Würzburg (Germany)
- David Okeke – F, Fiat Torino (Italy)
- (Croatia) Luka Šamanić – F, Petrol Olimpija (Slovenia)
- Deividas Sirvydis – G, Rytas Vilnius (Lithuania)
- Yovel Zoosman – G, Maccabi Tel Aviv (Israel)

=== Automatically eligible entrants ===
Players who do not meet the criteria for "international" players are automatically eligible if they meet any of the following criteria:

- They have completed four years of their college eligibility.
- If they graduated from high school in the U.S., but did not enroll in a U.S. college or university, four years have passed since their high school class graduated.
- They have signed a contract with a professional basketball team not in the NBA, anywhere in the world, and have played under that contract.

Players who meet the criteria for "international" players are automatically eligible if they meet any of the following criteria:

- They are at least 22 years old during the calendar year of the draft. In terms of dates, players born on or before December 31, 1997, are automatically eligible for the 2019 draft.
- They have signed a contract with a professional basketball team not in the NBA within the United States, and have played under that contract.

Other automatically eligible players
Player	Team	Note	Ref.
(United States) Darius Bazley	Princeton High School (Ohio)	Did not enter college or another league in 2018.	
(United States) Brian Bowen	Sydney Kings (Australia)	Did not attend college; playing professionally since the 2018–19 season.	
(Sweden) Elijah Clarance	Skyliners Frankfurt (Germany)	Left Illinois State in 2018; playing professionally since the 2018–19 season.	
(United States) Jalek Felton	BC Nokia (Finland)	Left North Carolina in 2018; playing professionally since the 2018–19 season.	
(Australia) Harry Froling	Adelaide 36ers (Australia)	Left Marquette in 2018; playing professionally since the 2018–19 season.	
(United States) Adonys Henriquez	Regatas Corrientes (Argentina)	Left Saint Louis in 2018; playing professionally since the 2018–19 season.	
(United States) Shawn Lee	Chicago Ballers (JBA)	Left Cloud County CC in 2018; playing professionally since the 2018–19 season.	
(United States) Marcus LoVett	Sloboda Užice (Serbia)	Left St. John's in 2018; playing professionally since the 2018–19 season.	
(United States) Deon Lyle	Chicago Ballers (JBA)	Left UTSA in 2018; playing professionally since the 2018–19 season.	
(Australia) Matur Maker	Zlatorog Laško (Slovenia)	Did not attend college; playing professionally since the 2018–19 season.	
(United States) JaMicheal Morgan	Seattle Ballers (JBA)	Graduated from high school in 2018; playing professionally since the 2018–19 season.	
(France) Darel Poirier	Capital City Go-Go (NBA G League)	International player; playing in NBA G League since the 2018–19 season.	
(United States) Micah Seaborn	Mega Basket Georgia (Georgia)	Left Monmouth in 2018; playing professionally since the 2018–19 season.	
(United States) Tavarius Shine	BC Luleå (Sweden)	Left Oklahoma State in 2018; playing professionally since the 2018–19 season.	
(Serbia) Alen Smailagić	Santa Cruz Warriors (NBA G League)	International player; playing in NBA G League since the 2018–19 season.	
(Czech Republic) Matej Svoboda	Tuři Svitavy (Czech Republic)	Left Dayton in 2018; playing professionally since the 2018–19 season.	
(Canada) Demba Thimbo	Los Angeles Ballers (JBA)	Did not attend college; playing professionally since the 2018–19 season.	

== Invited attendees ==
The NBA annually invites around 15–20 players to sit in the so-called "green room", a special room set aside at the draft site for the invited players plus their families and agents. When his name is called, the player leaves the room and goes up on stage. Other players who are not invited are allowed to attend the ceremony. They sit in the stands with the fans and walk up the stage when or if they are drafted. On June 8, the NBA announced only 9 invited players to the event (all of whom played collegiately this year). Four days later, the NBA invited seven more players to the event, bringing the number of invites up to 16. Two more players were invited the next day, bumping the number up to 18. On June 14, two more players were invited to this year's event, bringing up the total invites to 20. Five days later, three more players received last minute invitations for this year's NBA draft, bringing the total number of invites up to 23. On the night of the event, Matisse Thybulle was revealed as a last-minute invite, bumping up the final invite list to 24. The following players (listed alphabetically) were confirmed as invites for the event:

- (Canada) Nickeil Alexander-Walker, Virginia Tech (not on the original list, later invited)
- (Canada) RJ Barrett, Duke
- (Georgia (country)) Goga Bitadze, Mega Bemax (Serbia) (not on the original list, later invited)
- (Sudan) / (United States) Bol Bol, Oregon (not on the original list, later invited)
- (Canada) Brandon Clarke, Gonzaga (not on the original list, later invited)
- (United States) / (United States Virgin Islands) Nic Claxton, Georgia (not on the original list, later invited)
- (United States) Jarrett Culver, Texas Tech
- / (Guinea) Sekou Doumbouya, Limoges CSP (France) (not on the original list, later invited)
- (United States) Darius Garland, Vanderbilt
- (Japan) Rui Hachimura, Gonzaga (not on the original list, later invited)
- (United States) Jaxson Hayes, Texas
- (United States) Tyler Herro, Kentucky (not on the original list, later invited)
- (United States) De'Andre Hunter, Virginia
- (United States) Keldon Johnson, Kentucky (not on the original list, later invited)
- (Canada) Mfiondu Kabengele, Florida State (not on the original list, later invited)
- (United States) Romeo Langford, Indiana (not on the original list, later invited)
- (United States) Nassir Little, North Carolina (not on the original list, later invited)
- (United States) Ja Morant, Murray State
- (United States) Kevin Porter Jr., USC (not on the original list, later invited)
- (United States) Cam Reddish, Duke
- (United States) Matisse Thybulle, Washington (not on the original list, later invited)
- (United States) P. J. Washington, Kentucky (not on the original list, later invited)
- (United States) Coby White, North Carolina
- (United States) Zion Williamson, Duke

== See also ==
- List of first overall NBA draft picks
