= List of 2024–25 NBA season transactions =

This is a list of transactions that have taken place during the 2024 NBA off-season and the 2024–25 NBA season.

== Retirement ==
Date	Name	Team(s) played (years)	Age	Notes	Ref.
June 19	Sergio Rodríguez	Portland Trail Blazers (2006–2009); Sacramento Kings (2009–2010); New York Knicks (2010); Philadelphia 76ers (2016–2017)	38	Also played abroad	
July 1	Víctor Claver	Portland Trail Blazers (2012–2015)	35	Also played abroad	
July 2	Kemba Walker	Charlotte Bobcats / Hornets (2011–2019); Boston Celtics (2019–2021); New York Knicks (2021–2022); Dallas Mavericks (2022–2023)	34	All-NBA Third Team (2019); 4× NBA All-Star (2017–2020); 2× NBA Sportsmanship Award (2017, 2018); Also played abroad Hired as a player enhancement coach by the Charlotte Hornets	
July 13	Mike Muscala	Atlanta Hawks (2014–2018); Philadelphia 76ers (2018–2019); Los Angeles Lakers (2019); Oklahoma City Thunder (2019–2023; 2024); Boston Celtics (2023); Washington Wizards (2023–2024); Detroit Pistons (2024)	33	Also played in the NBA D-League/G League and abroad	
August 1	Gordon Hayward	Utah Jazz (2010–2017); Boston Celtics (2017–2020); Charlotte Hornets (2020–2024); Oklahoma City Thunder (2024)	34	NBA All-Star (2017)	
August 7	Kyle Guy	Sacramento Kings (2019–2021); Miami Heat (2021–2022)	26	Also played in the NBA D-League/G League and abroad Hired as an athlete development mentor and a special assistant by the Virginia Cavaliers	
August 7	Jeremy Lamb	Oklahoma City Thunder (2012–2015); Charlotte Hornets (2015–2019); Indiana Pacers (2019–2022); Sacramento Kings (2022)	32	Also played in the NBA D-League/G League	
August 15	Joe Harris	Cleveland Cavaliers (2014–2016); Brooklyn Nets (2016–2023); Detroit Pistons (2023–2024)	32	NBA Three-Point Contest champion (2019); Also played in the NBA D-League	
August 16	Rudy Fernández	Portland Trail Blazers (2008–2011); Denver Nuggets (2011–2012)	39	NBA All-Rookie Second Team (2009); Also played abroad	
August 20	Jorge Gutiérrez	Brooklyn Nets (2014); Milwaukee Bucks (2015); Charlotte Hornets (2016)	35	Also played in the NBA D-League and abroad Hired as an assistant coach by the Long Island Nets	
August 31	Justin Hamilton	Charlotte Bobcats (2014); Miami Heat (2014–2015); Minnesota Timberwolves (2015); Brooklyn Nets (2016–2017)	34	Also played in the NBA D-League and abroad Hired as a video coordinator and player development coach by the Golden State Warriors	
September 11	John Henson	Milwaukee Bucks (2012–2018); Cleveland Cavaliers (2018–2020); Detroit Pistons (2020)	33		
September 26	Greg Monroe	Detroit Pistons (2010–2015); Milwaukee Bucks (2015–2017; 2022); Phoenix Suns (2017–2018); Boston Celtics (2018; 2019); Toronto Raptors (2018–2019); Philadelphia 76ers (2019); Minnesota Timberwolves (2021–2022; 2022); Washington Wizards (2022); Utah Jazz (2022)	34	NBA All-Rookie Second Team (2011); Also played in the NBA G League and abroad Hired as a player development coach by the New Orleans Pelicans	
September 26	Derrick Rose	Chicago Bulls (2008–2016); New York Knicks (2016–2017; 2021–2023); Cleveland Cavaliers (2017–2018); Minnesota Timberwolves (2018–2019); Detroit Pistons (2019–2021); Memphis Grizzlies (2023–2024)	35	NBA Most Valuable Player (2011); All-NBA First Team (2011); 3× NBA All-Star (2010–2012); NBA Rookie of the Year (2009); NBA All-Rookie First Team (2009); No. 1 retired by the Chicago Bulls	
September 29	AJ Griffin	Atlanta Hawks (2022–2024)	21	Also played in the NBA G League	
October 2	Ish Smith	Houston Rockets (2010–2011); Memphis Grizzlies (2011); Golden State Warriors (2011–2012); Orlando Magic (2012–2013); Milwaukee Bucks (2013); Phoenix Suns (2013–2014); Oklahoma City Thunder (2014–2015); Philadelphia 76ers (2015; 2015–2016); New Orleans Pelicans (2015); Detroit Pistons (2016–2019); Washington Wizards (2019–2021; 2022); Charlotte Hornets (2021–2022; 2023–2024); Denver Nuggets (2022–2023)	36	NBA champion (2023); Also played in the NBA D-League; Hired as a pro scout by the Washington Wizards	
October 10	Danny Green	Cleveland Cavaliers (2009–2010; 2023); San Antonio Spurs (2010–2018); Toronto Raptors (2018–2019); Los Angeles Lakers (2019–2020); Philadelphia 76ers (2020–2022; 2023); Memphis Grizzlies (2022–2023)	37	3× NBA champion (2014, 2019, 2020); NBA All-Defensive Second Team (2017); Also played in the NBA D-League and abroad	
October 10	Victor Oladipo	Orlando Magic (2013–2016); Oklahoma City Thunder (2016–2017); Indiana Pacers (2017–2021); Houston Rockets (2021); Miami Heat (2021–2023)	32	2× NBA All-Star (2018, 2019); All-NBA Third Team (2018); NBA All-Defensive First Team (2018); NBA Most Improved Player (2018); NBA steals leader (2018); NBA All-Rookie First Team (2014); Hired as a sports analyst by ESPN	
October 12	Michael Carter-Williams	Philadelphia 76ers (2013–2015); Milwaukee Bucks (2015–2016); Chicago Bulls (2016–2017); Charlotte Hornets (2017–2018); Houston Rockets (2018–2019); Orlando Magic (2019–2022, 2023)	33	NBA Rookie of the Year (2014); NBA All-Rookie First Team (2014); Also played in the NBA G League	
October 15	R. J. Hunter	Boston Celtics (2015–2016; 2019); Chicago Bulls (2016); Houston Rockets (2018)	30	Also played in the NBA D-League/G League and abroad	
October 17	Aron Baynes	San Antonio Spurs (2013–2015); Detroit Pistons (2015–2017); Boston Celtics (2017–2019); Phoenix Suns (2019–2020); Toronto Raptors (2020–2021)	37	NBA champion (2014); Also played in the NBA D-League and abroad	
October 29	Rudy Gay	Memphis Grizzlies (2006–2013); Toronto Raptors (2013); Sacramento Kings (2013–2017); San Antonio Spurs (2017–2021); Utah Jazz (2021–2023)	38	NBA All-Rookie First Team (2007)	
November 3	D. J. Augustin	Charlotte Bobcats (2008–2012); Indiana Pacers (2012–2013); Toronto Raptors (2013); Chicago Bulls (2013–2014); Detroit Pistons (2014–2015); Oklahoma City Thunder (2015–2016); Denver Nuggets (2016); Orlando Magic (2016–2020); Milwaukee Bucks (2020–2021); Houston Rockets (2021–2022); Los Angeles Lakers (2022)	36	NBA All-Rookie Second Team (2009)	
November 21	Rodney Hood	Utah Jazz (2014–2018); Cleveland Cavaliers (2018–2019); Portland Trail Blazers (2019–2021); Toronto Raptors (2021); Milwaukee Bucks (2021–2022); Los Angeles Clippers (2022)	32	Also played in the NBA G League	
December 3	Paul Millsap	Utah Jazz (2006–2013); Atlanta Hawks (2013–2017); Denver Nuggets (2017–2021); Brooklyn Nets (2021–2022); Philadelphia 76ers (2022)	39	4× NBA All-Star (2014–2017); NBA All-Defensive Second Team (2016); NBA All-Rookie Second Team (2007)	
December 13	Anthony Randolph	Golden State Warriors (2008–2010); New York Knicks (2010–2011); Minnesota Timberwolves (2011–2012); Denver Nuggets (2012–2014)	35	Also played abroad	
December 23	Diante Garrett	Phoenix Suns (2012–2013); Utah Jazz (2013–2014)	36	Also played in the NBA D-League and abroad Hired as an assistant coach by the Iowa State Cyclones	
January 19	Theo Pinson	Brooklyn Nets (2018–2020); New York Knicks (2020–2021); Dallas Mavericks (2021–2023)	29	Also played in the NBA G League	
January 27	Branden Dawson	Los Angeles Clippers (2015–2016)	31	Also played in the NBA D-League and abroad	
February 4	Semih Erden	Boston Celtics (2010–2011); Cleveland Cavaliers (2011–2012)	38	Also played abroad	

== Front office movements ==
=== Head coaching changes ===
Off-season

Departure date	Team	Outgoing head coach	Reason for departure	Hire date	Incoming head coach	Last coaching position	Ref.
April 3	Charlotte Hornets	Steve Clifford	Stepped down	May 9	Charles Lee	Boston Celtics assistant coach (2023–2024)	
April 22	Brooklyn Nets	Kevin Ollie (interim)	Demoted	April 22	Jordi Fernández	Sacramento Kings associate head coach (2022–2024)	
May 3	Los Angeles Lakers	Darvin Ham	Fired	June 24	JJ Redick	Brooklyn Basketball Academy volunteer head coach – 4th grade boys team (2024)	
May 9	Phoenix Suns	Frank Vogel	Fired	May 11	Mike Budenholzer	Milwaukee Bucks head coach (2018–2023)	
May 23	Cleveland Cavaliers	J. B. Bickerstaff	Fired	June 28	Kenny Atkinson	Golden State Warriors associate head coach (2021–2024)	
June 19	Detroit Pistons	Monty Williams	Fired	July 3	J. B. Bickerstaff	Cleveland Cavaliers head coach (2020–2024)	

In-Season

Departure date	Team	Outgoing head coach	Reason for departure	Hire date	Incoming head coach	Last coaching position	Ref.
December 27	Sacramento Kings	Mike Brown	Fired	December 27	Doug Christie		
March 28	Memphis Grizzlies	Taylor Jenkins	Fired	March 28	Tuomas Iisalo		
April 8	Denver Nuggets	Michael Malone	Fired	April 8	David Adelman		

=== General manager changes ===
Off-season

Departure date	Team	Outgoing general manager	Reason for departure	Hire date	Incoming general manager	Last managerial position	Ref.
June 1	Detroit Pistons	Troy Weaver	Stepped down				

In-season

Departure date	Team	Outgoing general manager	Reason for departure	Hire date	Incoming general manager	Last managerial position	Ref.
April 8	Denver Nuggets	Calvin Booth	Fired				

== Player movements ==
=== Trades ===
June
June 21	To Chicago Bulls: Josh Giddey	To Oklahoma City Thunder: Alex Caruso	
June 26 (pre-draft)	To Brooklyn Nets: 2025 BKN first-round pick swap right relinquished; 2026 BKN first-round pick returned	To Houston Rockets: 2025 PHX first-round pick swap right (Note: Oklahoma City has the right to swap its pick for Houston if Houston's pick is No. 11–30. After that, Houston may swap the pick it holds for the Suns' pick.); 2027 PHX first-round pick; 2029 first-round pick (Note: The more favorable of the picks originally belonging to Dallas and Phoenix.); 2029 first-round pick swap right (Note: Houston may swap their own pick for the less favorable of the picks originally belonging to Dallas and Phoenix. This gives Houston the two most favorable of the picks originally belonging to Dallas, Houston, and Phoenix, with Brooklyn receiving the least favorable of the three.)	
June 26 (draft night)	To Denver Nuggets: Draft rights to DaRon Holmes II (No. 22)	To Phoenix Suns: Draft rights to Ryan Dunn (No. 28); 2024 MIN second-round pick (No. 56); 2026 DEN second-round pick; 2031 DEN second-round pick	
June 26 (draft night)	To Minnesota Timberwolves: Draft rights to Rob Dillingham (No. 8)	To San Antonio Spurs: 2030 MIN protected first-round pick swap right (Note: Minnesota will retain the pick if it's No. 1, otherwise San Antonio may swap for it.); 2031 MIN first-round pick	
June 26 (draft night)	To New York Knicks: Rights to Dillon Jones (No. 26) (Note: New York later flipped Jones's rights to Oklahoma City.); 2024 PHX second-round pick (No. 51)	To Washington Wizards: Draft rights to Kyshawn George (No. 24)	
June 26 (draft night)	To New York Knicks: 2025 second-round pick (Note: The more favorable of the picks originally belonging to Boston and Memphis.); 2026 GSW second-round pick; 2027 MIN second-round pick (Note: New York flipped this pick to Portland in the Tyler Kolek trade later the same day.); 2027 second-round pick (Note: The most favorable of the picks originally belonging to Houston, Indiana, Miami, and Oklahoma City.); 2027 second-round pick (Note: The second-most favorable of the picks originally belonging to Houston, Indiana, Miami, and Oklahoma City.)	To Oklahoma City Thunder: Draft rights to Dillon Jones (No. 26)	
June 27	To Dallas Mavericks: Draft rights to Melvin Ajinça (No. 51)	To New York Knicks: Draft rights to Ariel Hukporti (No. 58); Draft rights to Petteri Koponen (2007 No. 30); Cash considerations	
June 27	To Golden State Warriors: Lindy Waters III	To Oklahoma City Thunder: Draft rights to Quinten Post (No. 52) (Note: Post was drafted by Golden State, which traded his rights to Oklahoma City, which traded them to Portland. Portland sold the rights back to Golden State after the July moratorium ended.)	
June 27	To New Orleans Pelicans: Draft rights to Antonio Reeves (No. 47)	To Orlando Magic: 2030 NOP second-round pick swap right; 2031 NOP second-round pick swap right	
June 27	To Oklahoma City Thunder: Draft rights to Oso Ighodaro (No. 40) (Note: Ighodaro was drafted by Portland, which traded his rights to Oklahoma City, which traded them to New York, which traded them to Phoenix.)	To Portland Trail Blazers: Draft rights to Quinten Post (No. 52); Cash considerations	
June 27	To New York Knicks: Draft rights to Oso Ighodaro (No. 40); Cash considerations	To Oklahoma City Thunder: Draft rights to Ajay Mitchell (No. 38)	
June 27	To New York Knicks: Draft rights to Kevin McCullar Jr. (No. 56); 2028 BOS protected second-round pick (Note: New York will receive the pick if it's No. 46–60.)	To Phoenix Suns: Draft rights to Oso Ighodaro (No. 40)	
June 27	To New York Knicks: Draft rights to Tyler Kolek (No. 34)	To Portland Trail Blazers: Draft rights to Dani Díez (2015 No. 54) (Note: The New York press release mentions Diez's rights being included in the trade but Portland's does not.); 2027 MIN second-round pick; 2029 second-round pick (Note: The less favorable of the picks originally belonging to Indiana and Washington.); 2030 NYK second-round pick	
June 27	Three-team trade		
June 27	To Atlanta Hawks: Draft rights to Nikola Đurišić (No. 43) (from Miami)	To Houston Rockets: AJ Griffin (from Atlanta)	
June 27	To Miami Heat: Draft rights to Pelle Larsson (No. 44) (from Houston); Cash considerations (from Atlanta)		
June 28	To Sacramento Kings: Jalen McDaniels	To Toronto Raptors: Davion Mitchell; Aleksandar Vezenkov; Draft rights to Jamal Shead (No. 45); 2025 POR second-round pick	
July
July 6	To Atlanta Hawks: Dyson Daniels; E. J. Liddell; Larry Nance Jr.; Cody Zeller (sign-and-trade); 2025 LAL first-round pick; 2027 first-round pick (Note: The less favorable of the picks originally belonging to Milwaukee Bucks and New Orleans.)	To New Orleans Pelicans: Dejounte Murray	
July 6	To Brooklyn Nets: Bojan Bogdanović; Mamadi Diakite; Shake Milton (sign-and-trade); 2025 MIL protected first-round pick (Note: New York will receive the pick if it's No. 5–30.); 2025 NYK first-round pick; 2025 BKN second-round pick (Note: The team's own pick, which it previously traded away.); 2027 NYK first-round pick; 2028 NYK first-round pick swap (Note: Brooklyn may swap a pick for New York's, not necessarily their own.); 2029 NYK first-round pick; 2031 NYK first-round pick	To New York Knicks: Keita Bates-Diop; Mikal Bridges; Draft rights to Juan Pablo Vaulet (2015 No. 39); 2026 second-round pick (Note: The least favorable of the picks originally belonging to Detroit, Milwaukee, and Orlando.)	
July 6	To Charlotte Hornets: Devonte' Graham; 2025 NOP second-round pick	To San Antonio Spurs: Cash considerations	
July 6	To Dallas Mavericks: Quentin Grimes	To Detroit Pistons: Tim Hardaway Jr.; 2025 TOR second-round pick; 2028 MIA second-round pick; 2028 second-round pick (Note: The less favorable of the picks originally belonging to Charlotte and the Los Angeles Clippers.)	
July 6	To Golden State Warriors: Draft rights to Quinten Post (No. 52)	To Portland Trail Blazers: Cash considerations	
July 6	To Indiana Pacers: Draft rights to Johnny Furphy (No. 35)	To San Antonio Spurs: Draft rights to Juan Núñez (No. 36); Cash considerations	
July 6	To New Orleans Pelicans: 2027 CHI protected second-round pick (Note: New Orleans will receive the pick if it's No. 51–60.)	To Washington Wizards: Jonas Valančiūnas (sign-and-trade)	
July 6	To Portland Trail Blazers: Deni Avdija	To Washington Wizards: Malcolm Brogdon; Draft rights to Bub Carrington (No. 14); 2028 GSW second-round pick; 2029 first-round pick (Note: The second-most favorable of the picks originally belonging to Boston, Milwaukee, and Portland.); 2030 POR second-round pick	
July 6	Four-team trade		
July 6	To Detroit Pistons: Wendell Moore Jr. (from Minnesota); Draft rights to Bobi Klintman (No. 37) (from Minnesota)	To Memphis Grizzlies: Draft rights to Cam Spencer (No. 53) (from Detroit)	
July 6	To Minnesota Timberwolves: 2030 MEM protected second-round pick (Note: Minnesota will receive the pick if it's No. 51–60, otherwise they'll receive nothing.) (from Memphis); Cash considerations (from Toronto)	To Toronto Raptors: Draft rights to Ulrich Chomche (No. 57) (from Memphis)	
July 6	Six-team trade		
July 6	To Charlotte Hornets: Josh Green (from Dallas); Reggie Jackson (from Denver); 2029 DEN second-round pick (from Denver); 2030 DEN second-round pick (from Denver)	To Dallas Mavericks: Klay Thompson (sign-and-trade) (from Golden State); 2025 second-round pick (Note: As part of the trade, Charlotte sent Philadelphia's pick to Denver, which then sent the more favorable of Philadelphia's pick and its own pick to Dallas and the less favorable of the two to Minnesota.) (from Denver)	
July 6	To Denver Nuggets: 2025 PHI second-round pick (from Charlotte); Cash considerations (from Charlotte)	To Golden State Warriors: Kyle Anderson (sign-and-trade) (from Minnesota); Buddy Hield (sign-and-trade) (from Philadelphia)	
July 6	To Minnesota Timberwolves: 2025 second-round pick (from Denver); 2031 second-round pick swap right (from Golden State); Cash considerations (from Golden State)	To Philadelphia 76ers: 2031 DAL second-round pick (from Dallas)	
July 8	Three-team trade		
July 8	To Chicago Bulls: Chris Duarte (from Sacramento); RaiQuan Gray (two-way contract) (from San Antonio); 2025 SAC second-round pick (from Sacramento); 2028 SAC second-round pick (from Sacramento); Cash considerations (from Sacramento)	To Sacramento Kings: DeMar DeRozan (sign-and-trade) (from Chicago)	
July 8	To San Antonio Spurs: Harrison Barnes (from Sacramento); 2031 first-round pick swap right (Note: San Antonio may swap its pick with Sacramento.) (from Sacramento)		
July 18	To Los Angeles Clippers: Kris Dunn (sign-and-trade)	To Utah Jazz: Russell Westbrook; Draft rights to Balša Koprivica (2021 No. 57); 2030 second-round pick swap right; Cash considerations	
July 19	To Brooklyn Nets: Ziaire Williams; 2030 DAL second-round pick	To Memphis Grizzlies: Mamadi Diakite; Draft rights to Nemanja Dangubić (2014 No. 54)	
July 29	To Atlanta Hawks: David Roddy	To Phoenix Suns: E. J. Liddell	
October
October 2	Three-team trade		
October 2	To Charlotte Hornets: Charlie Brown Jr. (sign-and-trade) (from New York); DaQuan Jeffries (sign-and-trade) (from New York); Duane Washington Jr. (sign-and-trade) (from New York); 2025 second-round pick (Note: The less favorable of the picks originally belonging to Denver and Philadelphia.) (from Minnesota); 2026 GSW second-round pick (from New York); 2031 NYK second-round pick (from New York); Cash considerations (from New York)	To Minnesota Timberwolves: Keita Bates-Diop (from New York); Donte DiVincenzo (from New York); Julius Randle (from New York); 2025 DET protected first-round pick (Note: Minnesota will receive the pick if it's No. 15–30, otherwise it rolls over to 2026 (No. 12–30) then 2027 (No. 10–30); if it does not fall out of its protected range, it converts to a 2027 second-round pick.) (from New York)	
October 2	To New York Knicks: Karl-Anthony Towns (from Minnesota); Draft rights to James Nnaji (2023 No. 31) (from Charlotte)		
October 16	To Sacramento Kings: 2025 CHI protected second-round pick (Note: Sacramento will receive the pick if it's No. 56–60, otherwise San Antonio keeps the pick and the Kings receive nothing.)	To San Antonio Spurs: Jalen McDaniels; 2031 SAC second-round pick; Cash considerations	
December
December 15	To Brooklyn Nets: Reece Beekman (two-way contract); De'Anthony Melton; 2026 ATL second-round pick; 2028 ATL second-round pick; 2029 GSW second-round pick	To Golden State Warriors: Dennis Schröder; 2025 MIA protected second-round pick (Note: Golden State will receive the pick if it's No. 38–60.)	
December 15	To Indiana Pacers: Thomas Bryant	To Miami Heat: 2031 second-round pick swap right	
December 29	To Brooklyn Nets: Maxwell Lewis; D'Angelo Russell; 2027 LAL conditional second-round pick (Note: If the Lakers' pick is No. 1–4, their second-round pick will go to Utah.); 2030 LAL second-round pick; 2031 LAL second-round pick	To Los Angeles Lakers: Dorian Finney-Smith; Shake Milton	
January
January 15	To Charlotte Hornets: Josh Okogie; 2026 DEN second-round pick; 2031 DEN second-round pick; 2031 PHO second-round pick	To Phoenix Suns: Nick Richards; 2025 second-round pick (Note: The less favorable of the picks originally belonging to Denver and Philadelphia.)	
January 21	To Phoenix Suns: 2025 first-round pick (Note: The less favorable of the picks originally belonging to Cleveland and Minnesota); 2027 first-round pick (Note: The least favorable of the picks originally belonging to Cleveland, Minnesota, and Utah); 2029 first-round pick (Note: The least favorable of the picks originally belonging to Cleveland, Minnesota, and Utah. The Minnesota pick will not be available if it is No. 1–5.)	To Utah Jazz: 2031 PHO first-round pick	
February
February 1	To Los Angeles Clippers: Drew Eubanks; Patty Mills	To Utah Jazz: Mo Bamba; P. J. Tucker; 2030 LAC second-round pick (Note: The Jazz already had the right to swap for this pick from an earlier trade.); Cash considerations	
February 2	Three-team trade		
February 2	To Dallas Mavericks: Max Christie (from Los Angeles); Anthony Davis (from Los Angeles); 2029 LAL first-round pick (from Los Angeles); Cash considerations (from Utah)	To Los Angeles Lakers: Luka Dončić (from Dallas); Maxi Kleber (from Dallas); Markieff Morris (from Dallas); Cash considerations (from Utah)	
February 2	To Utah Jazz: Jalen Hood-Schifino (from Los Angeles); 2025 second-round pick (Note: Boston has the right to swap the most favorable of three picks (originally belonging to Detroit—if No. 31–55—Golden State, and Washington) for Dallas's own pick; Dallas will then send its post-swap pick to Utah.) (from Dallas); 2025 LAC second-round pick (from Los Angeles)		
February 3	To Charlotte Hornets: 2029 PHX second-round pick	To Oklahoma City Thunder: 2030 DEN conditional second-round pick (Note: If Denver dropped into the lottery sometime before 2030, Charlotte might not have received this pick at all due to protections on Denver's 2025, 2027, and 2029 first-round picks, in which case Oklahoma City would have received the pick directly from Denver. This trade removed the uncertainty for the Hornets and Thunder.)	
February 3	Three-team trade		
February 3	To Chicago Bulls: Zach Collins (from San Antonio); Kevin Huerter (from Sacramento); Tre Jones (from San Antonio); 2025 CHI first-round pick (from San Antonio)	To Sacramento Kings: Sidy Cissoko (from San Antonio); Zach LaVine (from Chicago); 2025 CHA protected first-round pick (Note: If the Charlotte pick is No. 1–14, Sacramento will instead receive the Hornets' 2026 and 2027 second-round picks.) (from San Antonio); 2025 CHI second-round pick (Note: San Antonio previously sent this pick to Sacramento with heavy protection, which this trade removed.) (from San Antonio); 2027 SAS first-round pick (from San Antonio); 2028 DEN protected second-round pick (Note: Sacramento will receive the pick if it's No. 34–60, otherwise they receive nothing.) (from San Antonio); 2028 SAC second-round pick (from Chicago); 2031 MIN first-round pick (from San Antonio)	
February 3	To San Antonio Spurs: De'Aaron Fox (from Sacramento); Jordan McLaughlin (from Sacramento)		
February 4	To Dallas Mavericks: Caleb Martin; 2030 PHI second-round pick (Note: This pick was later added to the trade following Martin's physical in Dallas.)	To Philadelphia 76ers: Quentin Grimes; 2025 second-round pick (Note: The more favorable of the picks originally belonging to Denver and Philadelphia.)	(Amended)
February 5	To New Orleans Pelicans: Cash considerations	To Oklahoma City Thunder: Daniel Theis; 2031 second-round pick (Note: Orlando has the right to swap its own pick for this one.)	
February 5	To Sacramento Kings: Jonas Valančiūnas	To Washington Wizards: Sidy Cissoko; 2028 DEN protected second-round pick (Note: Washington will receive the pick if it's No. 34–60. This is the same pick that Sacramento received from San Antonio in the De'Aaron Fox trade.); 2029 SAC second-round pick	
February 6	To Atlanta Hawks: Caris LeVert; Georges Niang; 2026 right to swap first-round picks (Note: San Antonio has the right to swap with Atlanta; the Cleveland could end up with their own pick, Minnesota's pick, or Utah's pick. After all the other swap rights are exercised or decline, the Hawks will be able to swap the pick they have for the pick the Cavaliers have.); 2027 CLE second-round pick; 2028 right to swap first-round picks (Note: Atlanta will be able to swap its own pick for the less favorable of the picks originally belonging to Cleveland and Utah.); 2029 CLE second-round pick; 2031 CLE second-round pick	To Cleveland Cavaliers: De'Andre Hunter	
February 6	To Atlanta Hawks: Draft rights to Alpha Kaba (2017 No. 60)	To Houston Rockets: Cody Zeller; 2028 HOU second-round pick	
February 6	To Atlanta Hawks: Bones Hyland; Terance Mann	To Los Angeles Clippers: Bogdan Bogdanović; 2025 MIN second-round pick; 2026 MEM protected second-round pick (Note: The Clippers will receive the pick if it's No. 31–42.); 2027 LAC second-round pick	
February 6	To Boston Celtics: 2031 HOU protected second-round pick (Note: Boston will receive the pick if it's No. 56–60.)	To Houston Rockets: Jaden Springer; 2027 protected second-round pick (Note: The less favorable of the picks originally belonging to New Orlean and Portland, if one or both is No. 56–60.); 2030 BOS second-round pick	
February 6	To Charlotte Hornets: Dalton Knecht; Cam Reddish; 2030 right to swap first-round pick (Note: Charlotte may swap their own pick for the Lakers' pick.); 2031 LAL first-round pick	To Los Angeles Lakers: Mark Williams	(Rescinded)
February 6	To Charlotte Hornets: Jusuf Nurkić; 2026 first-round pick (Note: If Washington's pick is No. 1–8, they have the option to swap with Phoenix; Orlando will then have the option to swap their own pick with Phoenix; Memphis will then have the option to swap their own pick with Phoenix. Charlotte will receive whichever pick Phoenix holds after all swap rights are exercised or declined.)	To Phoenix Suns: Cody Martin; Vasilije Micić; 2026 second-round pick (Note: The less favorable of the picks originally belonging to Denver and Golden State)	
February 6	To Detroit Pistons: Kenyon Martin Jr.; 2027 MIL second-round pick; 2031 DAL second-round pick	To Philadelphia 76ers: Cash considerations	
February 6	To Indiana Pacers: 2026 second-round pick (Note: Indiana will receive the pick if it's No. 56–60.)	To Toronto Raptors: James Wiseman; Cash considerations	
February 6	To Los Angeles Clippers: MarJon Beauchamp	To Milwaukee Bucks: Kevin Porter Jr.	
February 6	To New Orleans Pelicans: Bruce Brown; Kelly Olynyk; 2026 IND protected first-round pick (Note: New Orleans will receive the pick if it's No. 5–30, rolling over to 2027 with the same protection; if not conveyed by 2027, New Orleans will receive Utah's 2027 second-round pick and Dallas's 2028 second-round pick.); 2031 TOR second-round pick	To Toronto Raptors: Brandon Ingram	
February 6	To Philadelphia 76ers: Jared Butler; 2027 second-round pick (Note: The more favorable of the picks originally belonging to Golden State and Phoenix.); 2028 GSW second-round pick; 2030 WAS second-round pick; 2030 second-round pick (Note: The more favorable of the picks originally belonging to Phoenix and Portland.)	To Washington Wizards: Reggie Jackson; 2026 first-round pick (Note: The least favorable of the picks originally belonging to Houston (if No. 5–30), the Los Angeles Clippers, and Oklahoma City.)	
February 6	Three-team trade		
February 6	To Memphis Grizzlies: Marvin Bagley III (from Washington); Johnny Davis (from Washington); 2025 second-round pick (Note: The least favorable of the picks originally belonging to Detroit, Golden State, and Phoenix.) (from Washington); 2028 second-round pick (from Sacramento)	To Sacramento Kings: Jake LaRavia (from Memphis)	
February 6	To Washington Wizards: Colby Jones (from Sacramento); Alex Len (from Sacramento); Marcus Smart (from Memphis); 2025 MEM protected first-round pick (Note: Washington will receive the pick if it's No. 15–30.) (from Memphis)		
February 6	Four-team trade		
February 6	To Milwaukee Bucks: Kyle Kuzma (from Washington); Jericho Sims (from New York); 2025 second-round pick (Note: The second-most favorable of the second-round picks originally belonging to Detroit, Golden State, and Phoenix.) (from Washington); 2026 protected second-round pick (from San Antonio)	To New York Knicks: Delon Wright (from Milwaukee); Draft rights to Hugo Besson (2022 No. 58) (from Milwaukee); Cash considerations (from Milwaukee)	
February 6	To San Antonio Spurs: Patrick Baldwin Jr. (from Washington); Cash considerations (from Milwaukee)	To Washington Wizards: AJ Johnson (from Milwaukee); Khris Middleton (from Milwaukee); Draft rights to Mathias Lessort (2017 No. 50) (from New York); 2028 right to swap first-round picks (Note: Portland already has the right to swap picks with Milwaukee, so Washington would have the right to swap for whichever pick Milwaukee has after Portland's had its chance to swap; the Trail Blazer's 2025 first-round pick may unavailable in 2028 if they stay in the lottery through 2027.) (from Milwaukee); Cash considerations (from Milwaukee)	
February 6	Five-team trade		
February 6	To Detroit Pistons: Dennis Schröder (from Golden State); Lindy Waters III (from Golden State); 2031 second-round pick (Note: Minnesota has the right to swap picks with Golden State, then Golden State will send the pick it has to Detroit.) (from Golden State)	To Golden State Warriors: Jimmy Butler (from Miami)	
February 6	To Miami Heat: Kyle Anderson (from Golden State); Davion Mitchell (from Toronto); Andrew Wiggins (from Golden State); 2025 GSW protected first-round pick (Note: Miami will receive the pick if it's No. 11–30; if not conveyed it will roll ever to 2026 (No. 11–30) and 2027 (unprotected)) (from Golden State)	To Toronto Raptors: P. J. Tucker (from Utah); 2026 LAL second-round pick (from Miami); Cash considerations (from Miami)	
February 6	To Utah Jazz: Kenyon Martin Jr. (from Detroit); Josh Richardson (from Miami); 2028 second-round pick (Note: The least favorable of the picks originally belonging to Charlotte, Detroit (if No. 56–60), Los Angeles Clippers, Miami (if Dallas's first-round pick No. 3–30), and New York.) (from Detroit); 2031 second-round pick (Note: The more favorable of the picks originally belonging to Indiana and Miami) (from Miami); Cash considerations (from Miami)		

=== Free agents ===
The NBA's free agency period began on June 30 at 6 p.m. EST.

Players were allowed to sign new offers starting on July 6 at 12 p.m. ET, after the moratorium ended.

^{R}	Denotes unsigned players whose free-agent rights were renounced
^{T}	Denotes sign-and-trade players
^{C}	Denotes player who is claimed off waivers (same contract, different team)
	Denotes signed player who failed to make opening-day roster
	Denotes player whose deal was later turned into a two-way contract
	Denotes player signed to 10-day contract
	Denotes restricted free agent whose offer sheet was matched by his old team

Player	Date signed	New team	Former team	Ref
Luke Kornet	July 2	Boston Celtics		
Xavier Tillman	July 2	Boston Celtics		
Thomas Bryant *	July 3	Miami Heat		
Nate Hinton	July 3	Houston Rockets (Previously on a two-way contract)		
Jermaine Samuels	July 3	Houston Rockets (Previously on a two-way contract)		
Alec Burks	July 4	Miami Heat	New York Knicks	
Luka Garza	July 5	Minnesota Timberwolves		
Monté Morris	July 5	Phoenix Suns	Minnesota Timberwolves	
Mason Plumlee	July 5	Phoenix Suns	Los Angeles Clippers	
Garrett Temple	July 5	Toronto Raptors		
James Wiseman	July 5	Indiana Pacers	Detroit Pistons	
Kyle Anderson ^{T}	July 6	Golden State Warriors	Minnesota Timberwolves	
OG Anunoby *	July 6	New York Knicks		
Mo Bamba	July 6	Los Angeles Clippers	Philadelphia 76ers	
Goga Bitadze	July 6	Orlando Magic		
Kentavious Caldwell-Pope *	July 6	Orlando Magic	Denver Nuggets	
Max Christie (RFA)	July 6	Los Angeles Lakers		
Nic Claxton	July 6	Brooklyn Nets		
Paul George *	July 6	Philadelphia 76ers	Los Angeles Clippers	
Gary Harris	July 6	Orlando Magic		
Isaiah Hartenstein	July 6	Oklahoma City Thunder	New York Knicks	
Buddy Hield ^{T}	July 6	Golden State Warriors	Philadelphia 76ers	
Aaron Holiday	July 6	Houston Rockets		
Joe Ingles **	July 6	Minnesota Timberwolves	Orlando Magic	
LeBron James *	July 6	Los Angeles Lakers		
Damion Lee *	July 6	Phoenix Suns		
Kevin Love *	July 6	Miami Heat		
Naji Marshall	July 6	Dallas Mavericks	New Orleans Pelicans	
Caleb Martin *	July 6	Philadelphia 76ers	Miami Heat	
Shake Milton ^{T}	July 6	Brooklyn Nets	New York Knicks	
Malik Monk	July 6	Sacramento Kings		
Royce O'Neale	July 6	Phoenix Suns		
Neemias Queta ** (RFA)	July 6	Boston Celtics		
Isaiah Stevens	July 6	Miami Heat	Colorado State Rams (Undrafted in 2024)	
Klay Thompson ^{T}	July 6	Dallas Mavericks	Golden State Warriors	
Obi Toppin (RFA)	July 6	Indiana Pacers		
Jonas Valančiūnas ^{T}	July 6	Washington Wizards	New Orleans Pelicans	
Moritz Wagner **	July 6	Orlando Magic		
Patrick Williams (RFA)	July 6	Chicago Bulls		
Cody Zeller ^{T}	July 6	Atlanta Hawks	New Orleans Pelicans	
Bol Bol	July 7	Phoenix Suns		
Andre Drummond	July 7	Philadelphia 76ers	Chicago Bulls	
Isaiah Joe **	July 7	Oklahoma City Thunder		
Tyrese Maxey (RFA)	July 7	Philadelphia 76ers		
Kelly Oubre Jr.	July 7	Philadelphia 76ers		
Chris Paul	July 7	San Antonio Spurs	Golden State Warriors (Waived on June 30)	
Aaron Wiggins ** (RFA)	July 7	Oklahoma City Thunder		
Delon Wright	July 7	Milwaukee Bucks	Miami Heat	
DeMar DeRozan ^{T}	July 8	Sacramento Kings	Chicago Bulls	
Tobias Harris	July 8	Detroit Pistons	Philadelphia 76ers	
Haywood Highsmith	July 8	Miami Heat		
De'Anthony Melton	July 8	Golden State Warriors	Philadelphia 76ers	
Immanuel Quickley (RFA)	July 8	Toronto Raptors		
Pascal Siakam	July 8	Indiana Pacers		
Jalen Smith *	July 8	Chicago Bulls	Indiana Pacers	
Vlatko Čančar **	July 9	Denver Nuggets		
Marcus Domask	July 9	Chicago Bulls	Illinois Fighting Illini (Undrafted in 2024)	
Kai Jones **	July 9	Los Angeles Clippers		
Alex Len	July 9	Sacramento Kings		
Taurean Prince	July 9	Milwaukee Bucks	Los Angeles Lakers	
Paul Reed ^{C}	July 9	Detroit Pistons (Claimed off waivers)	Philadelphia 76ers (Waived on July 6)	
Daniel Theis	July 9	New Orleans Pelicans	Los Angeles Clippers	
Trendon Watford (RFA)	July 9	Brooklyn Nets		
Nicolas Batum	July 10	Los Angeles Clippers	Philadelphia 76ers	
Tristan Enaruna	July 10	Boston Celtics	Cleveland State Vikings (Undrafted in 2024)	
Eric Gordon *	July 10	Philadelphia 76ers	Phoenix Suns	
James Harden	July 10	Los Angeles Clippers		
Derrick Jones Jr.	July 10	Los Angeles Clippers	Dallas Mavericks	
Jordan McLaughlin	July 10	Sacramento Kings	Minnesota Timberwolves	
Kevin Porter Jr.	July 10	Los Angeles Clippers	PAOK (Greece)	
Malik Beasley	July 11	Detroit Pistons	Milwaukee Bucks	
Saddiq Bey	July 12	Washington Wizards	Atlanta Hawks	
Simone Fontecchio (RFA)	July 12	Detroit Pistons		
Jazian Gortman	July 12	Dallas Mavericks	Rip City Remix (NBA G League)	
Vít Krejčí (RFA)	July 12	Atlanta Hawks (Previously on a two-way contract)		
Kyle Lowry (RFA)	July 12	Philadelphia 76ers		
Emanuel Miller	July 12	Dallas Mavericks	TCU Horned Frogs (Undrafted in 2024)	
Josh Okogie *	July 12	Phoenix Suns		
Dario Šarić	July 12	Denver Nuggets	Golden State Warriors	
Taj Gibson	July 13	Charlotte Hornets	Detroit Pistons	
Miles Bridges	July 14	Charlotte Hornets		
Ron Harper Jr.	July 14	Boston Celtics	Toronto Raptors (Waived on December 8, 2023)	
Seth Curry	July 15	Charlotte Hornets (Waived on June 28)		
PJ Dozier	July 15	Minnesota Timberwolves	Partizan Mozzart Bet (Serbia)	
Kenyon Martin Jr.	July 15	Philadelphia 76ers		
Cameron Payne	July 15	New York Knicks	Philadelphia 76ers	
Jamison Battle	July 16	Toronto Raptors	Ohio State Buckeyes (Undrafted in 2024)	
Charles Bassey	July 17	San Antonio Spurs (Waived on July 8)		
Kris Dunn ^{T}	July 18	Los Angeles Clippers	Utah Jazz	
Cory Joseph	July 19	Orlando Magic	Indiana Pacers (Waived on February 8)	
Jackson Rowe	July 19	Golden State Warriors	Scarborough Shooting Stars (Canada)	
Riley Minix	July 20	San Antonio Spurs	Morehead State Eagles (Undrafted in 2024)	
Gary Trent Jr.	July 20	Milwaukee Bucks	Toronto Raptors	
Keon Johnson	July 21	Brooklyn Nets (Previously on a two-way contract)		
Sandro Mamukelashvili	July 22	San Antonio Spurs		
DeAndre Jordan	July 24	Denver Nuggets		
Anthony Gill	July 25	Washington Wizards		
James Johnson	July 25	Indiana Pacers		
Russell Westbrook	July 26	Denver Nuggets	Utah Jazz (Waived on July 20)	
Precious Achiuwa	July 30	New York Knicks		
Reggie Jackson	July 30	Philadelphia 76ers	Charlotte Hornets (Waived on July 23)	
Tyus Jones	July 30	Phoenix Suns	Washington Wizards	
Devonte' Graham	July 31	Portland Trail Blazers	Charlotte Hornets (Waived on July 6)	
Luke Kennard **	July 31	Memphis Grizzlies		
Gabe McGlothan	July 31	Denver Nuggets	Grand Canyon Antelopes (Undrafted in 2024)	
Jaylin Williams	July 31	Denver Nuggets	Auburn Tigers (Undrafted in 2024)	
Jahmir Young	July 31	Denver Nuggets	Maryland Terrapins (Undrafted in 2024)	
Chuma Okeke	August 1	New York Knicks	Orlando Magic	
Spencer Dinwiddie	August 3	Dallas Mavericks	Los Angeles Lakers	
Jamarion Sharp	August 3	Dallas Mavericks	Ole Miss Rebels (Undrafted in 2024)	
Bruno Fernando	August 4	Toronto Raptors	Atlanta Hawks (Waived on July 30)	
Zyon Pullin	August 5	Miami Heat (Waived on July 25; previously on a two-way contract)		
Malachi Flynn	August 7	San Antonio Spurs	Detroit Pistons	
Orlando Robinson	August 7	Sacramento Kings	Miami Heat (Waived on July 7)	
Brandon Boston Jr.	August 8	San Antonio Spurs	Los Angeles Clippers	
Cole Swider	August 8	Indiana Pacers	Miami Heat (Previously on a two-way contract)	
Johnny Juzang (RFA)	August 12	Utah Jazz (Previously on a two-way contract)		
Babacar Sané	August 12	Utah Jazz	NBA G League Ignite (NBA G League; undrafted in 2024)	
Henri Drell	August 13	Portland Trail Blazers	Chicago Bulls (Previously on a two-way contract)	
Drew Eubanks *	August 13	Utah Jazz	Phoenix Suns	
Kylor Kelley	August 13	Los Angeles Lakers	Maine Celtics (NBA G League)	
Sviatoslav Mykhailiuk	August 13	Utah Jazz	Boston Celtics	
Quincy Olivari	August 13	Los Angeles Lakers	Xavier Musketeers (Undrafted in 2024)	
Kenneth Lofton Jr.	August 15	Chicago Bulls	Utah Jazz (Waived on July 24)	
Jared Rhoden	August 19	Toronto Raptors	Detroit Pistons (Previously on a two-way contract)	
Javonte Green	August 22	New Orleans Pelicans	Chicago Bulls	
Kyle Mangas	August 23	Indiana Pacers	Indiana Mad Ants (NBA G League)	
Cameron McGriff	August 23	Indiana Pacers	Indios de Mayagüez (Puerto Rico)	
Dakota Mathias	August 26	Indiana Pacers	ratiopharm Ulm (Germany)	
James Akinjo	August 27	Milwaukee Bucks	Wisconsin Herd (NBA G League)	
Liam Robbins	August 27	Milwaukee Bucks	Birmingham Squadron (NBA G League)	
Matt Ryan	August 27	New Orleans Pelicans (Waived on August 23)		
Lonnie Walker IV	August 28	Boston Celtics	Brooklyn Nets	
Guerschon Yabusele	August 29	Philadelphia 76ers	Real Madrid (Spain)	
Max Fiedler	August 31	Philadelphia 76ers	Rice Owls (Undrafted in 2024)	
Judah Mintz	September 1	Philadelphia 76ers	Syracuse Orange (Undrafted in 2024)	
Jared Brownridge	September 4	Philadelphia 76ers	Delaware Blue Coats (NBA G League)	
Vincent Valerio-Bodon	September 4	Los Angeles Lakers	South Bay Lakers (NBA G League)	
Alex Fudge	September 5	Los Angeles Lakers	Dallas Mavericks (Waived on August 27; previously on a two-way contract)	
Elijah Harkless	September 5	Los Angeles Clippers	Saskatchewan Rattlers (Canada)	
Talen Horton-Tucker	September 5	Chicago Bulls	Utah Jazz	
Patty Mills	September 5	Utah Jazz	Miami Heat	
Armando Bacot	September 6	Memphis Grizzlies	North Carolina Tar Heels (Undrafted in 2024)	
RayJ Dennis	September 6	Los Angeles Clippers	Baylor Bears (Undrafted in 2024)	
Jordan Goodwin	September 6	Los Angeles Lakers	Memphis Grizzlies (Previously on a two-way contract)	
Yuki Kawamura	September 6	Memphis Grizzlies	Yokohama B-Corsairs (Japan)	
Miye Oni	September 6	Memphis Grizzlies	Osceola Magic (NBA G League)	
Mãozinha Pereira	September 6	Memphis Grizzlies (10-day contract ended on April 9)		
E. J. Liddell	September 7	Chicago Bulls	Phoenix Suns (Waived on August 27)	
Tristan Thompson	September 9	Cleveland Cavaliers		
Tyson Etienne	September 10	Brooklyn Nets	College Park Skyhawks (NBA G League)	
Jarrett Culver	September 11	Orlando Magic	Rio Grande Valley Vipers (NBA G League)	
Myron Gardner	September 11	Orlando Magic	Osceola Magic (NBA G League)	
Marcus Garrett	September 11	Charlotte Hornets	Greensboro Swarm (NBA G League)	
Keyontae Johnson	September 11	Charlotte Hornets	Oklahoma City Thunder (Previously on a two-way contract)	
Caleb McConnell	September 11	Charlotte Hornets	Oklahoma City Blue (NBA G League)	
Markieff Morris	September 11	Dallas Mavericks		
Jordan Schakel	September 11	Boston Celtics	Leones de Ponce (Puerto Rico)	
Trevon Scott	September 11	Orlando Magic	Osceola Magic (NBA G League)	
Jalen Slawson	September 11	Orlando Magic	Sacramento Kings (Previously on a two-way contract)	
Joel Soriano	September 11	Charlotte Hornets	St. John's Red Storm (Undrafted in 2024)	
Bryson Warren	September 11	Miami Heat	Sioux Falls Skyforce (NBA G League; undrafted in 2024)	
Malik Williams	September 11	Miami Heat	Toronto Raptors	
Ibou Badji	September 12	Milwaukee Bucks	Portland Trail Blazers (Previously on a two-way contract)	
Yuri Collins	September 13	Golden State Warriors	Santa Cruz Warriors (NBA G League)	
Landry Shamet	September 14	New York Knicks	Washington Wizards (Waived on July 6)	
Marcus Morris Sr.	September 15	New York Knicks	Cleveland Cavaliers	
Max Abmas	September 16	Utah Jazz	Texas Longhorns (Undrafted in 2024)	
Boogie Ellis	September 16	Sacramento Kings	USC Trojans (Undrafted in 2024)	
Philip Alston	September 17	Milwaukee Bucks	Loyola Ramblers (Undrafted in 2024)	
Devon Higgs	September 17	Detroit Pistons	Motor City Cruise (NBA G League)	
Javan Johnson	September 17	Golden State Warriors	Gladiadores de Anzoátegui (Venezuela)	
Isaac Okoro (RFA)	September 17	Cleveland Cavaliers		
Sam Peek	September 17	Detroit Pistons	Motor City Cruise (NBA G League)	
Donta Scott	September 17	Golden State Warriors	Maryland Terrapins (Undrafted in 2024)	
Dereon Seabron	September 17	Detroit Pistons	New Orleans Pelicans (Previously on a two-way contract)	
Dmytro Skapintsev	September 17	Boston Celtics	Westchester Knicks (NBA G League)	
Tolu Smith	September 17	Detroit Pistons	Mississippi State Bulldogs (Undrafted in 2024)	
Kevon Harris	September 18	Atlanta Hawks	Orlando Magic (Previously on a two-way contract)	
Javante McCoy	September 18	Detroit Pistons	Austin Spurs (NBA G League)	
Joey Hauser	September 19	Atlanta Hawks	Ontario Clippers (NBA G League)	
Jaden Shackelford	September 19	Phoenix Suns	Oklahoma City Blue (NBA G League)	
Nate Darling	September 20	Los Angeles Clippers	Ontario Clippers (NBA G League)	
Patrick Gardner	September 20	Brooklyn Nets	Petro de Luanda (Angola)	
Killian Hayes	September 20	Brooklyn Nets	Detroit Pistons (Waived on February 8)	
Keshawn Justice	September 20	Utah Jazz	Salt Lake City Stars (NBA G League)	
Tyrese Martin	September 20	Brooklyn Nets	Iowa Wolves (NBA G League)	
Mac McClung	September 20	Orlando Magic	Osceola Magic (NBA G League)	
Javonte Smart	September 20	Orlando Magic	Crvena zvezda Meridianbet (Serbia)	
Ethan Thompson	September 20	Orlando Magic	Osos de Manatí (Puerto Rico)	
Amari Bailey	September 21	Brooklyn Nets	Charlotte Hornets (Previously on a two-way contract)	
Dylan Disu	September 23	Toronto Raptors	Texas Longhorns (Undrafted in 2024)	
Dane Goodwin	September 23	Utah Jazz	Stockton Kings (NBA G League)	
Blake Hinson	September 23	Golden State Warriors	Los Angeles Lakers (Waived on September 16; previously on a two-way contract)	
Jameer Nelson Jr.	September 23	San Antonio Spurs	TCU Horned Frogs (Undrafted in 2024)	
Tyrese Samuel	September 23	Phoenix Suns	Florida Gators (Undrafted in 2024)	
Terry Taylor	September 23	Sacramento Kings	Chicago Bulls (Waived on April 4)	
Jules Bernard	September 24	Cleveland Cavaliers	Washington Wizards (Previously on a two-way contract)	
Izaiah Brockington	September 24	New Orleans Pelicans	Birmingham Squadron (NBA G League)	
Keion Brooks Jr.	September 24	New Orleans Pelicans	Washington Huskies (Undrafted in 2024)	
Jacob Gilyard	September 24	Cleveland Cavaliers	Brooklyn Nets (Previously on a two-way contract)	
Quincy Guerrier	September 24	Toronto Raptors	Illinois Fighting Illini (Undrafted in 2024)	
Nassir Little	September 24	Miami Heat	Phoenix Suns (Waived on August 27)	
Pete Nance	September 24	Cleveland Cavaliers (Previously on a two-way contract)		
Gabe Osabuohien	September 24	Cleveland Cavaliers	Calgary Surge (Canada)	
Galen Robinson Jr.	September 24	New Orleans Pelicans	Birmingham Squadron (NBA G League)	
Zhaire Smith	September 24	Cleveland Cavaliers	Cleveland Charge (NBA G League)	
Nae'Qwan Tomlin	September 24	Cleveland Cavaliers	Memphis Tigers (Undrafted in 2024)	
Jordan Bowden	September 25	Atlanta Hawks	Montreal Alliance (Canada)	
Kennedy Chandler	September 25	Toronto Raptors	Long Island Nets (NBA G League)	
Jalen Crutcher	September 25	New Orleans Pelicans	Birmingham Squadron (NBA G League)	
Dexter Dennis	September 25	Sacramento Kings	Cleveland Charge (NBA G League)	
Trevor Keels	September 25	Minnesota Timberwolves	Iowa Wolves (NBA G League)	
Kevin Knox II	September 25	Golden State Warriors	Rip City Remix (NBA G League)	
Jaedon LeDee	September 25	Minnesota Timberwolves	San Diego State Aztecs (Undrafted in 2024)	
Skylar Mays	September 25	Minnesota Timberwolves	Los Angeles Lakers (Previously on a two-way contract)	
Eugene Omoruyi	September 25	Minnesota Timberwolves	Washington Wizards (Waived on August 21)	
Justin Powell	September 25	Sacramento Kings	Cleveland Charge (NBA G League)	
Caleb Daniels	September 26	Miami Heat	Sioux Falls Skyforce (NBA G League)	
Mamadi Diakite	September 26	Phoenix Suns	Memphis Grizzlies (Waived on August 27)	
Frank Kaminsky	September 26	Phoenix Suns	Partizan Mozzart Bet (Serbia)	
Skal Labissière	September 26	Sacramento Kings	Stockton Kings (NBA G League)	
Joirdon Nicholas	September 26	Atlanta Hawks	Zonkeys de Tijuana (Mexico)	
Tyler Polley	September 26	Indiana Pacers	Kolossos H Hotels (Greece)	
Jahmi'us Ramsey	September 26	Toronto Raptors	Oklahoma City Blue (NBA G League)	
Keisei Tominaga	September 26	Indiana Pacers	Nebraska Cornhuskers (Undrafted in 2024)	
Moses Wood	September 26	Phoenix Suns	Washington Huskies (Undrafted in 2024)	
Josiah-Jordan James	September 27	Indiana Pacers	Tennessee Volunteers (Undrafted in 2024)	
Taevion Kinsey	September 27	Utah Jazz (Waived on August 12; previously on a two-way contract)		
Malevy Leons	September 27	Oklahoma City Thunder	Bradley Braves (Undrafted in 2024)	
Daeqwon Plowden	September 27	Atlanta Hawks	Golden State Warriors (Waived on September 24; previously on a two-way contract)	
Chasson Randle	September 27	Minnesota Timberwolves	AEK Athens (Greece)	
Alex Reese	September 27	Oklahoma City Thunder	Rip City Remix (NBA G League)	
Cormac Ryan	September 27	Oklahoma City Thunder	North Carolina Tar Heels (Undrafted in 2024)	
David Stockton	September 27	Phoenix Suns	Capitanes de Arecibo (Puerto Rico)	
Isaiah Wong	September 27	Utah Jazz	Indiana Pacers (Previously on a two-way contract)	
RaeQuan Battle	September 28	Charlotte Hornets	West Virginia Mountaineers (Undrafted in 2024)	
Harry Giles III	September 28	Charlotte Hornets	Los Angeles Lakers (Previously on a two-way contract)	
Nathan Mensah	September 28	San Antonio Spurs	Austin Spurs (NBA G League)	
Jaylen Sims	September 28	Charlotte Hornets	Greensboro Swarm (NBA G League)	
Brodric Thomas	September 28	Sacramento Kings	Ontario Clippers (NBA G League)	
Leaky Black	September 29	Washington Wizards	Charlotte Hornets (Waived on August 1; previously on a two-way contract)	
Kira Lewis Jr.	September 29	Washington Wizards	Utah Jazz	
Jaylen Nowell	September 29	Washington Wizards	Detroit Pistons (10-day contract ended on April 23)	
Isaiah Mobley	September 30	Philadelphia 76ers	Cleveland Cavaliers (Previously on a two-way contract)	
Lamar Stevens	September 30	Detroit Pistons	Memphis Grizzlies	
Jordan Tucker	September 30	Philadelphia 76ers	Chorale Roanne (France)	
Alondes Williams	September 30	Los Angeles Clippers	Miami Heat (Previously on a two-way contract)	
Adonis Arms	October 1	New Orleans Pelicans	Memphis Hustle (NBA G League)	
Thon Maker	October 1	Houston Rockets	Al Riyadi Beirut (Lebanon)	
David Muoka	October 1	Portland Trail Blazers	Long Island Nets (NBA G League; undrafted in 2024)	
Markquis Nowell	October 1	Houston Rockets	Raptors 905 (NBA G League)	
Damion Baugh	October 2	New York Knicks	South Bay Lakers (NBA G League)	
Charlie Brown Jr. ^{T}	October 2	Charlotte Hornets	New York Knicks (Previously on a two-way contract)	
Terence Davis	October 2	Milwaukee Bucks	Rip City Remix (NBA G League)	
DaQuan Jeffries ^{T}**	October 2	Charlotte Hornets	New York Knicks	
Alex O'Connell	October 2	New York Knicks	Umana Reyer Venezia (Italy)	
Chuma Okeke	October 2	New York Knicks (Waived on September 28)		
Joshua Primo	October 2	Chicago Bulls	Los Angeles Clippers (Waived on April 13)	
Duane Washington Jr. ^{T}	October 2	Charlotte Hornets	Partizan Mozzart Bet (Serbia; via New York Knicks)	
T. J. Warren	October 3	New York Knicks	Minnesota Timberwolves	
Ben Coupet Jr.	October 6	Chicago Bulls	Windy City Bulls (NBA G League)	
Tony Bradley	October 7	Atlanta Hawks	Texas Legends (NBA G League)	
Boo Buie	October 7	New York Knicks	Northwestern Wildcats (Undrafted in 2024)	
Aaron Estrada	October 7	Detroit Pistons	Alabama Crimson Tide (Undrafted in 2024)	
Charles Bediako	October 8	Denver Nuggets	Austin Spurs (NBA G League)	
Andrew Funk	October 8	Denver Nuggets	Chicago Bulls (Waived on July 24; previously on a two-way contract)	
Miller Kopp	October 8	Oklahoma City Thunder	Oklahoma City Blue (NBA G League)	
Will Richardson	October 8	Denver Nuggets	Grand Rapids Gold (NBA G League)	
Jay Scrubb	October 8	Boston Celtics (Waived on October 22, 2023; previously on a two-way contract)		
Mark Armstrong	October 9	Brooklyn Nets	Villanova Wildcats (Undrafted in 2024)	
Moses Brown	October 9	New York Knicks	Portland Trail Blazers	
Elijah Harkless	October 9	Los Angeles Clippers (Waived on September 26)		
Warren Washington	October 10	Miami Heat	Texas Tech Red Raiders (Undrafted in 2024)	
Javonte Cooke	October 11	Oklahoma City Thunder	Brampton Honey Badgers (Canada)	
Javon Freeman-Liberty	October 11	Chicago Bulls	Manisa Basket (Turkey)	
Josh Oduro	October 11	New Orleans Pelicans	Providence Friars (Undrafted in 2024)	
Elfrid Payton	October 11	New Orleans Pelicans	Indiana Mad Ants (NBA G League)	
Erik Stevenson	October 11	Washington Wizards	Cholet (France)	
Robert Baker	October 12	Orlando Magic	College Park Skyhawks (NBA G League)	
Chase Jeter	October 12	Oklahoma City Thunder	NH Ostrava (Czech Republic)	
Braxton Key	October 12	Los Angeles Clippers	Denver Nuggets (Previously on a two-way contract)	
John Butler Jr.	October 13	Washington Wizards	Capital City Go-Go (NBA G League)	
Taylor Funk	October 13	Washington Wizards	Capital City Go-Go (NBA G League)	
Mouhamadou Gueye	October 13	Washington Wizards	Toronto Raptors (Waived on June 25; previously on a two-way contract)	
Justin Lewis	October 13	Utah Jazz	Calgary Surge (Canada)	
Isaiah Miller	October 13	San Antonio Spurs	APR (Rwanda)	
Darius Brown II	October 14	Cleveland Cavaliers	Utah State Aggies (Undrafted in 2024)	
Trhae Mitchell	October 14	New Orleans Pelicans	Calgary Surge (Canada)	
James Bouknight	October 15	Portland Trail Blazers	Charlotte Hornets (Waived on February 8)	
Henry Ellenson	October 15	Milwaukee Bucks	Joventut Badalona (Spain)	
Jarkel Joiner	October 15	Atlanta Hawks	College Park Skyhawks (NBA G League)	
KJ Jones II	October 15	Brooklyn Nets	Emmanuel Lions (Undrafted in 2024)	
Jahlil Okafor	October 15	Indiana Pacers	Capitanes de Arecibo (Puerto Rico)	
Scotty Pippen Jr.	October 15	Memphis Grizzlies (Previously on a two-way contract)		
Buddy Boeheim	October 16	Oklahoma City Thunder	Detroit Pistons (Waived on June 29; previously on a two-way contract)	
Elijah Hughes	October 16	Cleveland Cavaliers	Promitheas Patras (Greece)	
David Johnson	October 16	Memphis Grizzlies	Memphis Hustle (NBA G League)	
Doug McDermott	October 16	Sacramento Kings	Indiana Pacers	
Alex Morales	October 16	Orlando Magic	Osos de Manatí (Puerto Rico)	
Miles Norris	October 16	Memphis Grizzlies	Çağdaş Bodrumspor (Turkey)	
Hason Ward	October 16	Boston Celtics	Scarborough Shooting Stars (Canada)	
Paul Watson	October 16	Phoenix Suns	Austin Spurs (NBA G League)	
Justise Winslow	October 16	Milwaukee Bucks	Raptors 905 (NBA G League)	
Nick Muszynski	October 17	Portland Trail Blazers	Bozic Estriche Knights Kirchheim (Germany)	
Jamaree Bouyea	October 18	San Antonio Spurs (Waived on September 15; previously on a two-way contract)		
Matt Bradley	October 18	Houston Rockets	Rostock Seawolves (Germany)	
Jamir Chaplin	October 18	Dallas Mavericks	Little Rock Trojans (Undrafted in 2024)	
Antoine Davis	October 18	Sacramento Kings	Rip City Remix (NBA G League)	
Jalen Lewis	October 18	Milwaukee Bucks	City Reapers (Overtime Elite; undrafted in 2024)	
Jarod Lucas	October 18	Dallas Mavericks	Nevada Wolf Pack (Undrafted in 2024)	
Grayson Murphy	October 18	Los Angeles Lakers	Dresden Titans (Germany)	
Shareef O'Neal	October 18	Sacramento Kings	NBA G League Ignite (NBA G League)	
Jordan Schakel	October 18	Boston Celtics (Waived on September 13)		
Drew Timme	October 18	Sacramento Kings	Wisconsin Herd (NBA G League)	
Tosan Evbuomwan	October 19	Los Angeles Clippers	Detroit Pistons (Waived on October 16)	
Kevin Obanor	October 19	Toronto Raptors	Raptors 905 (NBA G League)	
Alex Reese	October 19	Oklahoma City Thunder (Waived on October 16)		
Jared Rhoden ^{C}	October 21	Charlotte Hornets	Toronto Raptors (Waived on October 19)	
Brandon Boston Jr. ^{C}	October 21	New Orleans Pelicans	San Antonio Spurs (Waived on October 19)	
Jay Huff	October 28	Memphis Grizzlies (Previously on a two-way contract)		
Malevy Leons	October 31	Oklahoma City Thunder (Waived on October 19)		
Jaylen Nowell	November 3	New Orleans Pelicans	Capital City Go-Go (NBA G League)	
Ariel Hukporti	November 5	New York Knicks (Previously on a two-way contract)		
Matt Ryan	November 5	New York Knicks	Westchester Knicks (NBA G League)	
Branden Carlson	November 16	Oklahoma City Thunder	Raptors 905 (NBA G League)	
Moses Brown	November 20	Indiana Pacers	Westchester Knicks (NBA G League)	
Elfrid Payton	November 20	New Orleans Pelicans	Birmingham Squadron (NBA G League)	
Jae Crowder	November 27	Sacramento Kings	Milwaukee Bucks	
Javante McCoy	December 15	Detroit Pistons	Motor City Cruise (NBA G League)	
Paul Reed	December 16	Detroit Pistons (Waived on December 14)		
Landry Shamet	December 23	New York Knicks	Westchester Knicks (NBA G League)	
Keshad Johnson	December 26	Miami Heat (Previously on a two-way contract)		
Eugene Omoruyi	January 8	Toronto Raptors (Signed to a 10-day contract)	Raptors 905 (NBA G League)	
Branden Carlson	January 10	Oklahoma City Thunder (Signed to a 10-day contract; waived on January 7)		
Orlando Robinson	January 18	Toronto Raptors (Signed to a 10-day contract)	Sacramento Kings (Waived on January 7)	
Branden Carlson	January 22	Oklahoma City Thunder (Signed to a second 10-day contract)		
Orlando Robinson	January 28	Toronto Raptors (Signed to a second 10-day contract)		
Ajay Mitchell	February 6	Oklahoma City Thunder (previously on a two-way contract)		
Jamison Battle	February 7	Toronto Raptors (previously on a two-way contract)		
Chuma Okeke	February 7	Philadelphia 76ers (Signed to a 10-day contract)	Westchester Knicks (NBA G League)	
Elfrid Payton	February 7	Charlotte Hornets (Signed to a 10-day contract)	Birmingham Squadron (NBA G League)	
Quinten Post	February 7	Golden State Warriors (previously on a two-way contract)		
Torrey Craig	February 8	Boston Celtics (signed for rest of season)	Chicago Bulls (Waived on February 3)	
Daishen Nix	February 8	Sacramento Kings (Signed to a 10-day contract)	Rio Grande Valley Vipers (NBA G League)	
Jaylen Nowell	February 8	Washington Wizards (Signed to a 10-day contract)	Capital City Go-Go (NBA G League)	
Bismack Biyombo	February 9	San Antonio Spurs (Signed to a 10-day contract)	Oklahoma City Thunder	
Moussa Diabaté	February 9	Charlotte Hornets (previously on a two-way contract)		
Justin Edwards	February 9	Philadelphia 76ers (previously on a two-way contract)		
Ben Simmons	February 10	Los Angeles Clippers (signed for rest of season)	Brooklyn Nets (Waived on February 8)	
Alex Len	February 11	Los Angeles Lakers (signed for rest of season)	Washington Wizards (Waived on February 8)	
Jahlil Okafor	February 11	Indiana Pacers (Signed to a 10-day contract)	Indiana Mad Ants (NBA G League)	
David Roddy	February 11	Philadelphia 76ers (Signed to a 10-day contract)	Atlanta Hawks (Waived on February 7)	
Markelle Fultz	February 12	Sacramento Kings (signed for rest of season)	Orlando Magic	
Jared Butler	February 13	Philadelphia 76ers (previously on a two-way contract)		
Erik Stevenson	February 17	Washington Wizards (Signed to a 10-day contract)	Capital City Go-Go (NBA G League)	
Elfrid Payton	February 18	Charlotte Hornets (Second 10-day contract)		
Yuri Collins	February 19	Golden State Warriors (Signed to a 10-day contract)	Santa Cruz Warriors (NBA G League)	
Kevin Knox II	February 19	Golden State Warriors (Signed to a 10-day contract)	Santa Cruz Warriors (NBA G League)	
Jared Rhoden	February 19	Toronto Raptors (Signed to a 10-day contract)	Raptors 905 (NBA G League)	
Moses Brown	February 20	Dallas Mavericks (Signed to a 10-day contract)	Westchester Knicks (NBA G League)	
Killian Hayes	February 20	Brooklyn Nets (Signed to a 10-day contract)	Long Island Nets (NBA G League)	
Tyrese Martin	February 20	Brooklyn Nets (previously on a two-way contract)		
Jaden Springer	February 20	Utah Jazz (Signed to a 10-day contract)	Houston Rockets (Waived on February 6)	
Nae'Qwan Tomlin	February 20	Cleveland Cavaliers (Signed to a 10-day contract)	Canton Charge (NBA G League)	
Bismack Biyombo	February 21	San Antonio Spurs (Second 10-day contract)		
Lamar Stevens	February 21	Memphis Grizzlies (Signed to a 10-day contract)	Motor City Cruise (NBA G League)	
Lonnie Walker IV	February 21	Philadelphia 76ers (Signed to multi-year contract)	Žalgiris Kaunas (Lithuania)	
Jalen McDaniels	February 22	Washington Wizards (Signed to a 10-day contract)	Capital City Go-Go (NBA G League)	
Javonte Green	February 23	Cleveland Cavaliers (signed for rest of season)	New Orleans Pelicans (Waived on February 20)	
Brandon Boston Jr.	February 26	New Orleans Pelicans (previously on a two-way contract)		
Jaylen Clark	February 27	Minnesota Timberwolves (previously on a two-way contract)		
Malachi Flynn	March 1	Charlotte Hornets (Signed to a 10-day contract)	Austin Spurs (NBA G League)	
Kevon Harris	March 1	Atlanta Hawks (Signed to a 10-day contract)	College Park Skyhawks (NBA G League)	
Kevin Knox II	March 1	Golden State Warriors (Second 10-day contract)		
Jordan Miller	March 1	Los Angeles Clippers (previously on a two-way contract)		
Tony Bradley	March 2	Indiana Pacers (Signed to a 10-day contract)	College Park Skyhawks (NBA G League)	
Jaden Springer	March 2	Utah Jazz (Signed to multi-year contract)		
Nate Williams	March 2	Houston Rockets (previously on a two-way contract)		
Bismack Biyombo	March 3	San Antonio Spurs (Signed for rest of season)		
Justin Champagnie	March 3	Washington Wizards (previously on a two-way contract)		
Skal Labissière	March 3	Sacramento Kings (Signed to a 10-day contract)	Stockton Kings (NBA G League)	
Lamar Stevens	March 3	Memphis Grizzlies (Second 10-day contract)		
Dominick Barlow	March 4	Atlanta Hawks (previously on a two-way contract)		
Orlando Robinson	March 4	Toronto Raptors (previously on a two-way contract)		
Ryan Rollins	March 4	Milwaukee Bucks (previously on a two-way contract)		
Pat Spencer	March 4	Golden State Warriors (previously on a two-way contract)		
Colin Castleton	March 6	Toronto Raptors (Signed to a 10-day contract)	Osceola Magic (NBA G League)	
Mo Bamba	March 10	New Orleans Pelicans (Signed to a 10-day contract)	Birmingham Squadron (NBA G League)	
P. J. Tucker	March 10	New York Knicks (Signed to a 10-day contract)	Toronto Raptors (Waived on February 28)	
Marcus Garrett	March 12	Charlotte Hornets (Signed to a 10-day contract)	Greensboro Swarm (NBA G League)	
Tony Bradley	March 13	Indiana Pacers (Second 10-day contract)		
Lamar Stevens	March 13	Memphis Grizzlies (Signed for rest of season)		
Oshae Brissett	March 14	Philadelphia 76ers (Signed to a 10-day contract)	Long Island Nets (NBA G League)	
Colin Castleton	March 16	Toronto Raptors (Second 10-day contract)		
Chuma Okeke	March 16	Philadelphia 76ers (Second 10-day contract)	Westchester Knicks (NBA G League)	
Terry Taylor	March 18	Sacramento Kings (Signed to a 10-day contract)	Stockton Kings (NBA G League)	
P. J. Tucker	March 20	New York Knicks (Second 10-day contract)		
Elfrid Payton	March 21	New Orleans Pelicans (Signed to a 10-day contract)	Charlotte Hornets (2nd 10-day contract ended February 28)	
Isaac Jones	March 22	Sacramento Kings (previously on a two-way contract)		
Tony Bradley	March 23	Indiana Pacers (Signed for rest of season)		
Kevin Knox II	March 23	Golden State Warriors (Signed for rest of season; 2nd 10-day contract ended March 11)		
Marcus Bagley	March 24	Philadelphia 76ers (Signed to a 10-day contract)	Delaware Blue Coats (NBA G League)	
Cole Swider	March 26	Toronto Raptors (Signed to a 10-day contract)	South Bay Lakers (NBA G League)	
Phillip Wheeler	March 26	Philadelphia 76ers (Signed to a 10-day contract)	Maine Celtics (NBA G League)	
Jordan Goodwin	March 27	Los Angeles Lakers (previously on a two-way contract)		
Drew Timme	March 28	Brooklyn Nets (Signed to multi-year contract)	Long Island Nets (NBA G League)	
P. J. Tucker	April 1	New York Knicks (Signed for rest of season)		
Elfrid Payton	April 2	New Orleans Pelicans (Second 10-day contract)		
Colin Castleton	April 3	Philadelphia 76ers (Signed to a 10-day contract)	Toronto Raptors (2nd 10-day contract ended March 26)	
Kylor Kelley	April 3	New Orleans Pelicans (Signed to a 10-day contract)	South Bay Lakers (NBA G League)	
Jaylen Sims	April 3	Charlotte Hornets (Signed to a 10-day contract)	Greensboro Swarm (NBA G League)	
Marcus Bagley	April 5	Philadelphia 76ers (Second 10-day contract; 1st 10-day contract ended April 2)		
Chuma Okeke	April 5	Cleveland Cavaliers (Signed to multi-year contract)	Westchester Knicks (NBA G League)	
Cole Swider	April 5	Toronto Raptors (Signed for rest of season)		
Terence Davis	April 9	Sacramento Kings (signed for rest of season)	Wisconsin Herd (NBA G League)	
Brandon Williams	April 10	Dallas Mavericks (previously on a two-way contract)		
Elfrid Payton	April 11	New Orleans Pelicans (Signed to multi-year contract)		
A. J. Lawson	April 12	Toronto Raptors (previously on a two-way contract)		
Colin Castleton	April 13	Toronto Raptors (Signed to multi-year contract)	Philadelphia 76ers (10-day contract ended April 12)	
Kylor Kelley	April 13	New Orleans Pelicans (Second 10-day contract)		
Braxton Key	April 13	Golden State Warriors (previously on a two-way contract)		
Isaiah Mobley	April 13	Philadelphia 76ers (Signed to a 10-day contract)	Delaware Blue Coats (NBA G League)	
Jaylen Sims	April 13	Charlotte Hornets (signed for rest of season)		
JD Davison	April 14	Boston Celtics (previously on a two-way contract)		
Thanasis Antetokounmpo			Milwaukee Bucks	
Marques Bolden			Charlotte Hornets (Waived on July 3; previously on a two-way contract)	
Reggie Bullock			Houston Rockets	
Jamir Chaplin			Dallas Mavericks (Waived on October 19)	
Robert Covington ^{R}			Philadelphia 76ers	
Cui Yongxi			Brooklyn Nets (Waived on December 15; previously on a two-way contract)	
Malcolm Hill			New Orleans Pelicans (Waived on October 21; previously on a two-way contract)	
Danuel House Jr.			Detroit Pistons (Waived on February 8, 2024)	
Isaiah Livers			Washington Wizards (Waived on April 5, 2024)	
Robin Lopez			Sacramento Kings (Waived on February 8, 2024)	
Wesley Matthews			Atlanta Hawks	
Marcus Morris Sr.			New York Knicks (Waived on September 28)	
Jason Preston			Utah Jazz (Waived on November 22; previously on a two-way contract)	
Olivier Sarr ^{R}			Oklahoma City Thunder (Previously on a two-way contract)	
Thaddeus Young			Phoenix Suns	

* Player option
** Team option
*** Early termination option

=== Two-way contracts ===
Per recent NBA rules implemented as of the 2024–25 season, teams are permitted to have three two-way players on their roster at any given time, in addition to their 15-man regular season roster. A two-way player will provide services primarily to the team's G League affiliate, but can spend up to 50 days with the parent NBA team. Only players with four or fewer years of NBA experience are able to sign two-way contracts, which can be for either one season or two. Players entering training camp for a team have a chance to convert their training camp deal into a two-way contract if they prove themselves worthy enough for it. Teams also have the option to convert a two-way contract into a regular, minimum-salary NBA contract, at which point the player becomes a regular member of the parent NBA team. Two-way players are not eligible for NBA playoff rosters, so a team must convert any two-way players it wants to use in the playoffs, while waiving another player in the process.

	Denotes players who were promoted to the main roster
	Denotes players who were cut before season's end
	Denotes players who were traded away before season's end
^{C}	Denotes players who are claimed off waivers (same contract, different team)
^{T}	Denotes players acquired in a trade

Player	Date signed	Team	School / Club team	Ref
Keshad Johnson	July 1	Miami Heat	Arizona Wildcats (Undrafted in 2024)	
Justin Minaya	July 1	Portland Trail Blazers (Previously on a two-way contract)		
Zyon Pullin	July 1	Miami Heat	Florida Gators (Undrafted in 2024)	
Dru Smith	July 1	Miami Heat (Waived on March 6)		
Jalen Bridges	July 2	Phoenix Suns	Baylor Bears (Undrafted in 2024)	
Isaiah Crawford	July 2	Sacramento Kings	Louisiana Tech Bulldogs (Undrafted in 2024)	
Collin Gillespie	July 2	Phoenix Suns	Denver Nuggets (Previously on a two-way contract)	
Trey Alexander	July 3	Denver Nuggets	Creighton Bluejays (Undrafted in 2024)	
Reece Beekman	July 3	Golden State Warriors	Virginia Cavaliers (Undrafted in 2024)	
Blake Hinson	July 3	Los Angeles Lakers	Pittsburgh Panthers (Undrafted in 2024)	
Isaac Jones	July 3	Sacramento Kings	Washington State Cougars (Undrafted in 2024)	
Drew Peterson (RFA)	July 3	Boston Celtics (Previously on a two-way contract)		
Armel Traoré	July 3	Los Angeles Lakers	ADA Blois (France; undrafted in 2024)	
Tristan Vukčević	July 3	Washington Wizards		
Nate Williams (RFA)	July 3	Houston Rockets (Previously on a two-way contract)		
Justin Edwards	July 4	Philadelphia 76ers	Kentucky Wildcats (Undrafted in 2024)	
Branden Carlson	July 5	Toronto Raptors	Utah Utes (Undrafted in 2024)	
Taevion Kinsey	July 5	Utah Jazz	Salt Lake City Stars (NBA G League)	
Trevelin Queen (RFA)	July 5	Orlando Magic (Previously on a two-way contract)		
Colin Castleton (RFA)	July 6	Los Angeles Lakers (Previously on a two-way contract)		
Daniss Jenkins	July 6	Detroit Pistons	St. John's Red Storm (Undrafted in 2024)	
Ajay Mitchell	July 6	Oklahoma City Thunder	UC Santa Barbara Gauchos	
Adama Sanogo (RFA)	July 6	Chicago Bulls (Previously on a two-way contract)		
KJ Simpson	July 7	Charlotte Hornets	Colorado Buffaloes	
JD Davison	July 8	Boston Celtics (Previously on a two-way contract)		
RaiQuan Gray ^{T}	July 8	Chicago Bulls	San Antonio Spurs	
Ariel Hukporti	July 8	New York Knicks	MHP Riesen Ludwigsburg (Germany)	
Cam Spencer	July 8	Memphis Grizzlies	UConn Huskies	
Ulrich Chomche	July 9	Toronto Raptors	APR (Rwanda)	
N'Faly Dante	July 9	Houston Rockets	Oregon Ducks (Undrafted in 2024)	
Jesse Edwards	July 9	Minnesota Timberwolves	West Virginia Mountaineers (Undrafted in 2024)	
Seth Lundy (RFA)	July 9	Atlanta Hawks (Previously on a two-way contract)		
Stanley Umude **	July 9	Milwaukee Bucks	Detroit Pistons	
PJ Hall	July 10	Denver Nuggets	Clemson Tigers (Undrafted in 2024)	
Daishen Nix	July 10	Minnesota Timberwolves (Previously on a two-way contract)		
Brandon Williams (RFA)	July 10	Dallas Mavericks (Previously on a two-way contract)		
Bryce McGowens	July 11	Portland Trail Blazers	Charlotte Hornets (Waived on July 6)	
Jamal Cain	July 12	New Orleans Pelicans	Miami Heat (Previously on a two-way contract)	
Alex Ducas	July 15	Oklahoma City Thunder	Saint Mary's Gaels (Undrafted in 2024)	
Keaton Wallace	July 15	Atlanta Hawks	College Park Skyhawks (NBA G League)	
Daeqwon Plowden	July 16	Golden State Warriors	Osceola Magic (NBA G League)	
DJ Steward	July 21	Chicago Bulls	Maine Celtics (NBA G League)	
Jeff Dowtin **	July 22	Philadelphia 76ers		
David Jones	July 22	Philadelphia 76ers	Memphis Tigers (Undrafted in 2024)	
Trentyn Flowers	July 24	Los Angeles Clippers	Adelaide 36ers (Australia; undrafted in 2024)	
Jay Huff	July 24	Memphis Grizzlies	Denver Nuggets (Previously on a two-way contract)	
Josh Christopher	July 25	Miami Heat	Sioux Falls Skyforce (NBA G League)	
Jack McVeigh	July 25	Houston Rockets	Tasmania JackJumpers (Australia)	
David Duke Jr.	July 26	San Antonio Spurs (Previously on a two-way contract)		
Quenton Jackson (RFA)	July 26	Indiana Pacers (Previously on a two-way contract)		
Trey Jemison ^{C}	July 26	New Orleans Pelicans (Claimed off waivers)	Memphis Grizzlies (Waived on July 24; previously on a two-way contract)	
Tristen Newton	July 27	Indiana Pacers	UConn Huskies	
Harrison Ingram	July 29	San Antonio Spurs	North Carolina Tar Heels	
Dominick Barlow	July 30	Atlanta Hawks	San Antonio Spurs	
Spencer Jones	July 30	Denver Nuggets	Stanford Cardinal (Undrafted in 2024)	
Moussa Diabaté	July 31	Charlotte Hornets	Los Angeles Clippers (Previously on a two-way contract)	
Anton Watson	August 2	Boston Celtics	Gonzaga Bulldogs	
TyTy Washington Jr.	August 2	Phoenix Suns	Milwaukee Bucks (Previously on a two-way contract)	
Kevin McCullar Jr.	August 5	New York Knicks	Kansas Jayhawks	
Micah Potter	August 6	Utah Jazz (Previously on a two-way contract)		
Enrique Freeman	August 8	Indiana Pacers	Akron Zips	
Anžejs Pasečņiks	August 10	Milwaukee Bucks	CD Zunder Palencia (Spain)	
Oscar Tshiebwe (RFA)	August 12	Utah Jazz	Indiana Pacers (Previously on a two-way contract)	
Jacob Toppin (RFA)	August 14	New York Knicks (Previously on a two-way contract)		
Emoni Bates (RFA)	August 20	Cleveland Cavaliers (Previously on a two-way contract)		
Kessler Edwards	August 27	Dallas Mavericks	Sacramento Kings	
Luke Travers	August 28	Cleveland Cavaliers	Melbourne United (Australia)	
JT Thor	September 9	Cleveland Cavaliers	Charlotte Hornets	
Tazé Moore	September 13	Portland Trail Blazers	Vancouver Bandits (Canada)	
Christian Koloko	September 16	Los Angeles Lakers	Toronto Raptors (Waived on January 17)	
Cui Yongxi	September 20	Brooklyn Nets	Guangzhou Loong Lions (China; undrafted in 2024)	
Quinten Post	September 26	Golden State Warriors	Boston College Eagles	
Lester Quiñones	September 26	Philadelphia 76ers	Golden State Warriors	
A. J. Lawson	October 11	Dallas Mavericks (Waived on October 8)		
Jazian Gortman	October 18	Dallas Mavericks		
Jamison Battle	October 19	Toronto Raptors		
RayJ Dennis	October 19	Washington Wizards	Los Angeles Clippers (Waived on October 9)	
Kai Jones	October 19	Los Angeles Clippers		
Yuki Kawamura	October 19	Memphis Grizzlies		
E. J. Liddell	October 19	Chicago Bulls		
Tyrese Martin	October 19	Brooklyn Nets		
Mac McClung	October 19	Orlando Magic		
Riley Minix	October 19	San Antonio Spurs		
Quincy Olivari	October 19	Los Angeles Lakers		
Brandon Boston Jr.	October 21	New Orleans Pelicans		
Jared Butler	October 21	Washington Wizards (Waived on October 19)		
Jared Rhoden	October 21	Charlotte Hornets		
Liam Robbins	October 21	Milwaukee Bucks		
Cole Swider	October 21	Detroit Pistons	Indiana Pacers (Waived on October 18)	
Alondes Williams	October 22	Detroit Pistons	Los Angeles Clippers (Waived on October 19)	
Colin Castleton	October 30	Memphis Grizzlies	Long Island Nets (NBA G League)	
Boo Buie	November 5	New York Knicks	Westchester Knicks (NBA G League)	
David Jones	November 22	Utah Jazz	Mexico City Capitanes (NBA G League)	
Isaiah Wong	December 2	Charlotte Hornets	Salt Lake City Stars (NBA G League)	
Pete Nance	December 3	Philadelphia 76ers	Cleveland Charge (NBA G League)	
A. J. Lawson	December 11	Toronto Raptors	Long Island Nets (NBA G League)	
Reece Beekman ^{T}	December 15	Brooklyn Nets	Golden State Warriors	
Matt Ryan	December 24	New York Knicks (Waived on December 22)		
Isaiah Stevens	December 26	Miami Heat	Sioux Falls Skyforce (NBA G League)	
Daeqwon Plowden	December 27	Atlanta Hawks	College Park Skyhawks (NBA G League)	
Emanuel Miller	December 28	Chicago Bulls	Texas Legends (NBA G League)	
Tosan Evbuomwan	January 1	Brooklyn Nets	San Diego Clippers (NBA G League)	
Elijah Harkless	January 1	Utah Jazz	San Diego Clippers (NBA G League)	
RayJ Dennis	January 3	Indiana Pacers	San Diego Clippers (NBA G League)	
Tristen Newton ^{C}	January 3	Minnesota Timberwolves	Indiana Pacers	
Ron Harper Jr.	January 6	Detroit Pistons	Maine Celtics (NBA G League)	
Tolu Smith	January 6	Detroit Pistons	Motor City Cruise (NBA G League)	
Keion Brooks Jr.	January 9	New Orleans Pelicans	Birmingham Squadron (NBA G League)	
Zyon Pullin	January 10	Memphis Grizzlies	Sioux Falls Skyforce (NBA G League)	
Pete Nance	January 14	Philadelphia 76ers	Cleveland Charge (NBA G League)	
Trey Jemison	January 15	Los Angeles Lakers	New Orleans Pelicans (Waived on January 9; previously on a two-way contract)	
Kylor Kelley	January 26	Dallas Mavericks	South Bay Lakers (NBA G League)	
Jackson Rowe	January 28	Golden State Warriors	Santa Cruz Warriors (NBA G League)	
Branden Carlson	February 6	Oklahoma City Thunder (10-day contract ended February 1)		
Jordan Goodwin	February 7	Los Angeles Lakers	South Bay Lakers (NBA G League)	
Orlando Robinson	February 7	Toronto Raptors (10-day contract ended February 6)		
Ethan Thompson	February 7	Orlando Magic	Osceola Magic (NBA G League)	
Sidy Cissoko	February 8	Portland Trail Blazers	Washington Wizards (Waived on February 6)	
Jaylen Martin	February 8	Washington Wizards	Delaware Blue Coats (NBA G League)	
Damion Baugh	February 12	Charlotte Hornets	Westchester Knicks (NBA G League)	
Wendell Moore Jr.	February 15	Charlotte Hornets	Detroit Pistons (Waived on February 6)	
Jahmir Young	February 19	Chicago Bulls	Grand Rapids Gold (NBA G League)	
Alex Reese	February 21	Philadelphia 76ers	Rip City Remix (NBA G League)	
David Roddy	February 21	Philadelphia 76ers (10-day contract ended February 20)		
Taran Armstrong	February 25	Golden State Warriors	Cairns Taipans (Australia)	
Kendall Brown	February 25	Brooklyn Nets	Long Island Nets (NBA G League)	
Jalen Crutcher	February 26	New Orleans Pelicans	Birmingham Squadron (NBA G League)	
Bones Hyland	February 27	Minnesota Timberwolves	Atlanta Hawks (Waived on February 8)	
Pete Nance	February 28	Milwaukee Bucks	Cleveland Charge (NBA G League)	
Jalen Hood-Schifino	March 1	Philadelphia 76ers	Utah Jazz (Waived on February 7)	
Patrick Baldwin Jr.	March 2	Los Angeles Clippers	San Diego Clippers (NBA G League)	
Seth Lundy	March 2	Los Angeles Clippers	Atlanta Hawks (Waived on December 18; previously on a two-way contract)	
Lester Quiñones	March 2	New Orleans Pelicans	Birmingham Squadron (NBA G League)	
Nae'Qwan Tomlin	March 2	Cleveland Cavaliers (10-day contract ended March 1)		
Kai Jones	March 3	Dallas Mavericks	Los Angeles Clippers (Waived on March 1)	
JT Thor ^{C}	March 3	Washington Wizards (Claimed off waivers)	Cleveland Cavaliers (Waived on March 2)	
MarJon Beauchamp	March 4	New York Knicks	Los Angeles Clippers (Waived on March 2)	
Jamaree Bouyea	March 4	Milwaukee Bucks	Austin Spurs (NBA G League)	
Tyson Etienne	March 4	Brooklyn Nets	Long Island Nets (NBA G League)	
Braxton Key	March 4	Golden State Warriors	San Diego Clippers (NBA G League)	
Miles Norris	March 4	Boston Celtics	Memphis Hustle (NBA G League)	
Jared Rhoden	March 4	Toronto Raptors	Raptors 905 (NBA G League)	
Jacob Toppin	March 4	Atlanta Hawks	New York Knicks (Waived on March 2)	
Anton Watson ^{C}	March 4	New York Knicks (Claimed off waivers)	Boston Celtics (Waived on March 2)	
David Roddy	March 6	Houston Rockets	Philadelphia 76ers (Waived on March 1)	

=== Going to other North American leagues ===
The new league of all players is the NBA G League, although some players have returned to their former team, as shown below. The NBA contract status of nearly all players is unrestricted free agent, and the rest is stated otherwise.

*	Denotes NBA G League players who returned to their former team
^{†}	Previously on a two-way contract
	Denotes players whose NBA contract status is unsigned draft pick
^{R}	Denotes unsigned players whose free-agent rights were renounced

Player	Date signed	New team	NBA team	Ref
Javon Freeman-Liberty *	October 15	Windy City Bulls	Chicago Bulls	
Buddy Boeheim	October 25	Oklahoma City Blue	Oklahoma City Thunder	
Javonte Cooke	October 25	Oklahoma City Blue	Oklahoma City Thunder	
Chase Jeter	October 25	Oklahoma City Blue	Oklahoma City Thunder	
Trevor Keels *	October 25	Iowa Wolves	Minnesota Timberwolves	
Miller Kopp *	October 25	Oklahoma City Blue	Oklahoma City Thunder	
Jaedon LeDee	October 25	Iowa Wolves	Minnesota Timberwolves	
Jahmi'us Ramsey *	October 25	Oklahoma City Blue	Toronto Raptors	
Chasson Randle	October 25	Iowa Wolves	Minnesota Timberwolves	
Cormac Ryan	October 25	Oklahoma City Blue	Oklahoma City Thunder	
Jules Bernard	October 26	Cleveland Charge	Cleveland Cavaliers	
Jordan Bowden *	October 26	College Park Skyhawks	Atlanta Hawks	
Tony Bradley	October 26	College Park Skyhawks	Atlanta Hawks	
Darius Brown II	October 26	Cleveland Charge	Cleveland Cavaliers	
Nikola Đurišić	October 26	College Park Skyhawks	Atlanta Hawks	
Tristan Enaruna	October 26	Maine Celtics	Boston Celtics	
Alex Fudge *	October 26	South Bay Lakers	Los Angeles Lakers	
Jordan Goodwin	October 26	South Bay Lakers	Los Angeles Lakers	
Jacob Gilyard	October 26	Cleveland Charge	Cleveland Cavaliers	
Ron Harper Jr.	October 26	Maine Celtics	Boston Celtics	
Kevon Harris	October 26	College Park Skyhawks	Atlanta Hawks	
Joey Hauser	October 26	College Park Skyhawks	Atlanta Hawks	
Elijah Hughes	October 26	Cleveland Charge	Cleveland Cavaliers	
Jarkel Joiner *	October 26	College Park Skyhawks	Atlanta Hawks	
Kylor Kelley	October 26	South Bay Lakers	Los Angeles Lakers	
Jarod Lucas	October 26	Texas Legends	Dallas Mavericks	
Emanuel Miller	October 26	Texas Legends	Dallas Mavericks	
Grayson Murphy	October 26	South Bay Lakers	Los Angeles Lakers	
Pete Nance *	October 26	Cleveland Charge	Cleveland Cavaliers	
Joirdon Nicholas	October 26	College Park Skyhawks	Atlanta Hawks	
Gabe Osabuohien *	October 26	Cleveland Charge	Cleveland Cavaliers	
Daeqwon Plowden	October 26	College Park Skyhawks	Atlanta Hawks	
Matt Ryan	October 26	Westchester Knicks	New Orleans Pelicans	
Jordan Schakel *	October 26	Maine Celtics	Boston Celtics	
Jay Scrubb	October 26	Maine Celtics	Boston Celtics	
Landry Shamet	October 26	Westchester Knicks	New York Knicks	
Jamarion Sharp	October 26	Texas Legends	Dallas Mavericks	
Dmytro Skapintsev	October 26	Maine Celtics	Boston Celtics	
Zhaire Smith *	October 26	Cleveland Charge	Cleveland Cavaliers	
Nae'Qwan Tomlin	October 26	Cleveland Charge	Cleveland Cavaliers	
Vincent Valerio-Bodon *	October 26	South Bay Lakers	Los Angeles Lakers	
Hason Ward	October 26	Maine Celtics	Boston Celtics	
Mark Armstrong	October 27	Long Island Nets	Brooklyn Nets	
Amari Bailey	October 27	Long Island Nets	Brooklyn Nets	
Robert Baker	October 27	Osceola Magic	Orlando Magic	
RaeQuan Battle	October 27	Greensboro Swarm	Charlotte Hornets	
Matt Bradley	October 27	Rio Grande Valley Vipers	Houston Rockets	
Kendall Brown	October 27	Long Island Nets	Indiana Pacers	
Colin Castleton ^{†}	October 27	Long Island Nets	Los Angeles Lakers	
Jarrett Culver	October 27	Osceola Magic	Orlando Magic	
Antoine Davis	October 27	Stockton Kings	Sacramento Kings	
Dexter Dennis	October 27	Stockton Kings	Sacramento Kings	
Mamadi Diakite	October 27	Valley Suns	Phoenix Suns	
Boogie Ellis	October 27	Stockton Kings	Sacramento Kings	
Tyson Etienne	October 27	Long Island Nets	Brooklyn Nets	
Myron Gardner *	October 27	Osceola Magic	Orlando Magic	
Patrick Gardner *	October 27	Long Island Nets	Brooklyn Nets	
Marcus Garrett *	October 27	Greensboro Swarm	Charlotte Hornets	
Killian Hayes	October 27	Long Island Nets	Brooklyn Nets	
Nate Hinton *	October 27	Rio Grande Valley Vipers	Houston Rockets	
Josiah-Jordan James	October 27	Indiana Mad Ants	Indiana Pacers	
Keyontae Johnson	October 27	Greensboro Swarm	Charlotte Hornets	
KJ Jones II	October 27	Long Island Nets	Brooklyn Nets	
Skal Labissière *	October 27	Stockton Kings	Sacramento Kings	
A. J. Lawson ^{†}	October 27	Long Island Nets	Dallas Mavericks	
Thon Maker	October 27	Rio Grande Valley Vipers	Houston Rockets	
Kyle Mangas *	October 27	Indiana Mad Ants	Indiana Pacers	
Dakota Mathias	October 27	Indiana Mad Ants	Indiana Pacers	
Caleb McConnell	October 27	Greensboro Swarm	Charlotte Hornets	
Cameron McGriff *	October 27	Indiana Mad Ants	Indiana Pacers	
Alex Morales *	October 27	Osceola Magic	Orlando Magic	
Markquis Nowell	October 27	Rio Grande Valley Vipers	Houston Rockets	
Shareef O'Neal	October 27	Stockton Kings	Sacramento Kings	
Jahlil Okafor	October 27	Indiana Mad Ants	Indiana Pacers	
Tyler Polley	October 27	Indiana Mad Ants	Indiana Pacers	
Justin Powell	October 27	Stockton Kings	Sacramento Kings	
Tyrese Samuel	October 27	Valley Suns	Phoenix Suns	
Jermaine Samuels *	October 27	Rio Grande Valley Vipers	Houston Rockets	
Trevon Scott *	October 27	Osceola Magic	Orlando Magic	
Jaden Shackelford	October 27	Valley Suns	Phoenix Suns	
Jaylen Sims *	October 27	Greensboro Swarm	Charlotte Hornets	
Jalen Slawson	October 27	Osceola Magic	Orlando Magic	
Javonte Smart	October 27	Osceola Magic	Orlando Magic	
Joel Soriano	October 27	Greensboro Swarm	Charlotte Hornets	
David Stockton	October 27	Valley Suns	Phoenix Suns	
Terry Taylor	October 27	Stockton Kings	Sacramento Kings	
Ethan Thompson	October 27	Osceola Magic	Orlando Magic	
Drew Timme	October 27	Stockton Kings	Sacramento Kings	
Keisei Tominaga	October 27	Indiana Mad Ants	Indiana Pacers	
Paul Watson	October 27	Valley Suns	Phoenix Suns	
Moses Wood	October 27	Valley Suns	Phoenix Suns	
Max Abmas	October 28	Salt Lake City Stars	Utah Jazz	
James Akinjo *	October 28	Wisconsin Herd	Milwaukee Bucks	
Philip Alston	October 28	Wisconsin Herd	Milwaukee Bucks	
Armando Bacot	October 28	Memphis Hustle	Memphis Grizzlies	
Ibou Badji *	October 28	Wisconsin Herd	Milwaukee Bucks	
Damion Baugh	October 28	Westchester Knicks	New York Knicks	
Charles Bediako	October 28	Grand Rapids Gold	Denver Nuggets	
Leaky Black	October 28	Capital City Go-Go	Washington Wizards	
James Bouknight	October 28	Rip City Remix	Portland Trail Blazers	
Izaiah Brockington *	October 28	Birmingham Squadron	New Orleans Pelicans	
Keion Brooks Jr.	October 28	Birmingham Squadron	New Orleans Pelicans	
Charlie Brown Jr.	October 28	Raptors 905	Charlotte Hornets	
Greg Brown III ^{†}	October 28	Mexico City Capitanes	Dallas Mavericks	
Moses Brown *	October 28	Westchester Knicks	New York Knicks	
Jared Brownridge *	October 28	Delaware Blue Coats	Philadelphia 76ers	
Boo Buie	October 28	Westchester Knicks	New York Knicks	
John Butler Jr. *	October 28	Capital City Go-Go	Washington Wizards	
Branden Carlson ^{†}	October 28	Raptors 905	Toronto Raptors	
Kennedy Chandler	October 28	Raptors 905	Toronto Raptors	
Yuri Collins *	October 28	Santa Cruz Warriors	Golden State Warriors	
Ben Coupet Jr. *	October 28	Windy City Bulls	Chicago Bulls	
Jalen Crutcher *	October 28	Birmingham Squadron	New Orleans Pelicans	
Caleb Daniels *	October 28	Sioux Falls Skyforce	Miami Heat	
Nate Darling *	October 28	San Diego Clippers	Los Angeles Clippers	
Terence Davis	October 28	Wisconsin Herd	Milwaukee Bucks	
RayJ Dennis ^{†}	October 28	San Diego Clippers	Washington Wizards	
Dylan Disu	October 28	Raptors 905	Toronto Raptors	
Marcus Domask	October 28	Windy City Bulls	Chicago Bulls	
Henri Drell	October 28	Rip City Remix	Portland Trail Blazers	
Henry Ellenson	October 28	Wisconsin Herd	Milwaukee Bucks	
Tosan Evbuomwan	October 28	San Diego Clippers	Los Angeles Clippers	
Max Fiedler	October 28	Delaware Blue Coats	Philadelphia 76ers	
Andrew Funk *	October 28	Grand Rapids Gold	Denver Nuggets	
Taylor Funk *	October 28	Capital City Go-Go	Washington Wizards	
Dane Goodwin	October 28	Salt Lake City Stars	Utah Jazz	
Quincy Guerrier	October 28	Raptors 905	Toronto Raptors	
Mouhamadou Gueye	October 28	Capital City Go-Go	Washington Wizards	
Elijah Harkless *	October 28	San Diego Clippers	Los Angeles Clippers	
Blake Hinson	October 28	Santa Cruz Warriors	Golden State Warriors	
David Johnson *	October 28	Memphis Hustle	Memphis Grizzlies	
Javan Johnson *	October 28	Santa Cruz Warriors	Golden State Warriors	
David Jones ^{†}	October 28	Mexico City Capitanes	Philadelphia 76ers	
Keshawn Justice *	October 28	Salt Lake City Stars	Utah Jazz	
Braxton Key	October 28	San Diego Clippers	Los Angeles Clippers	
Taevion Kinsey *	October 28	Salt Lake City Stars	Utah Jazz	
Kevin Knox II	October 28	Santa Cruz Warriors	Golden State Warriors	
Jalen Lewis	October 28	Wisconsin Herd	Milwaukee Bucks	
Justin Lewis *	October 28	Salt Lake City Stars	Utah Jazz	
Kira Lewis Jr.	October 28	Capital City Go-Go	Washington Wizards	
Nassir Little	October 28	Sioux Falls Skyforce	Miami Heat	
Gabe McGlothan	October 28	Grand Rapids Gold	Denver Nuggets	
Judah Mintz	October 28	Delaware Blue Coats	Philadelphia 76ers	
Trhae Mitchell	October 28	Birmingham Squadron	New Orleans Pelicans	
Isaiah Mobley	October 28	Delaware Blue Coats	Philadelphia 76ers	
David Muoka	October 28	Rip City Remix	Portland Trail Blazers	
Nick Muszynski	October 28	Rip City Remix	Portland Trail Blazers	
Miles Norris	October 28	Memphis Hustle	Memphis Grizzlies	
Jaylen Nowell	October 28	Capital City Go-Go	Washington Wizards	
Alex O'Connell	October 28	Westchester Knicks	New York Knicks	
Kevin Obanor *	October 28	Raptors 905	Toronto Raptors	
Josh Oduro	October 28	Birmingham Squadron	New Orleans Pelicans	
Chuma Okeke	October 28	Westchester Knicks	New York Knicks	
Elfrid Payton	October 28	Birmingham Squadron	New Orleans Pelicans	
Mãozinha Pereira	October 28	Memphis Hustle	Memphis Grizzlies	
Joshua Primo	October 28	Windy City Bulls	Chicago Bulls	
Zyon Pullin	October 28	Sioux Falls Skyforce	Miami Heat	
Will Richardson *	October 28	Grand Rapids Gold	Denver Nuggets	
Galen Robinson Jr. *	October 28	Birmingham Squadron	New Orleans Pelicans	
Jackson Rowe *	October 28	Santa Cruz Warriors	Golden State Warriors	
Babacar Sané	October 28	Salt Lake City Stars	Utah Jazz	
Donta Scott	October 28	Santa Cruz Warriors	Golden State Warriors	
Isaiah Stevens	October 28	Sioux Falls Skyforce	Miami Heat	
Erik Stevenson	October 28	Capital City Go-Go	Washington Wizards	
Jordan Tucker	October 28	Delaware Blue Coats	Philadelphia 76ers	
Bryson Warren *	October 28	Sioux Falls Skyforce	Miami Heat	
T. J. Warren	October 28	Westchester Knicks	New York Knicks	
Warren Washington	October 28	Sioux Falls Skyforce	Miami Heat	
Jaylin Williams	October 28	Grand Rapids Gold	Denver Nuggets	
Malik Williams *	October 28	Sioux Falls Skyforce	Miami Heat	
Justise Winslow	October 28	Wisconsin Herd	Milwaukee Bucks	
Isaiah Wong	October 28	Salt Lake City Stars	Utah Jazz	
Jahmir Young	October 28	Grand Rapids Gold	Denver Nuggets	
Jamaree Bouyea *	October 29	Austin Spurs	San Antonio Spurs	
Aaron Estrada	October 29	Motor City Cruise	Detroit Pistons	
Malachi Flynn	October 29	Austin Spurs	San Antonio Spurs	
Devon Higgs *	October 29	Motor City Cruise	Detroit Pistons	
Javante McCoy	October 29	Motor City Cruise	Detroit Pistons	
Nathan Mensah	October 29	Austin Spurs	San Antonio Spurs	
Isaiah Miller	October 29	Austin Spurs	San Antonio Spurs	
Jameer Nelson Jr.	October 29	Austin Spurs	San Antonio Spurs	
Sam Peek *	October 29	Motor City Cruise	Detroit Pistons	
Dereon Seabron	October 29	Motor City Cruise	Detroit Pistons	
Tolu Smith	October 29	Motor City Cruise	Detroit Pistons	
Lamar Stevens	October 29	Motor City Cruise	Detroit Pistons	
Alex Reese *	November 3	Rip City Remix	Oklahoma City Thunder	
Malevy Leons *	November 19	Oklahoma City Blue	Oklahoma City Thunder	
Eugene Omoruyi	November 21	Raptors 905	Minnesota Timberwolves	
Jalen McDaniels	November 22	Memphis Hustle	San Antonio Spurs	
Jaylen Nowell *	November 22	Capital City Go-Go	New Orleans Pelicans	
Lester Quiñones ^{†}	December 6	Birmingham Squadron	Philadelphia 76ers	
Elfrid Payton *	December 7	Birmingham Squadron	New Orleans Pelicans	
Jared Rhoden ^{†}	December 8	Raptors 905	Charlotte Hornets	
Devonte' Graham	December 13	South Bay Lakers	Portland Trail Blazers	
Moses Brown *	December 15	Westchester Knicks	Indiana Pacers	
Frank Kaminsky	December 16	Raptors 905	Phoenix Suns	
Javante McCoy *	December 19	Motor City Cruise	Detroit Pistons	
Dennis Smith Jr.	December 20	Wisconsin Herd	Brooklyn Nets	
Boo Buie * ^{†}	December 27	Westchester Knicks	New York Knicks	
David Jones * ^{†}	January 3	Mexico City Capitanes	Utah Jazz	
DJ Steward ^{†}	January 6	Memphis Hustle	Chicago Bulls	
Pete Nance * ^{†}	January 10	Cleveland Charge	Philadelphia 76ers	
Jaylen Martin	January 11	Delaware Blue Coats	Brooklyn Nets	
Daishen Nix	January 11	Rio Grande Valley Vipers	Minnesota Timberwolves	
Alondes Williams ^{†}	January 12	Sioux Falls Skyforce	Detroit Pistons	
Colin Castleton ^{†}	January 15	Osceola Magic	Memphis Grizzlies	
Oshae Brissett	January 18	Long Island Nets	Boston Celtics	
Eugene Omoruyi *	January 19	Raptors 905	Toronto Raptors	
Quincy Olivari * ^{†}	January 22	South Bay Lakers	Los Angeles Lakers	
Isaiah Thomas *	January 28	Salt Lake City Stars	Phoenix Suns	
D. J. Carton ^{†}	January 29	San Diego Clippers	Toronto Raptors	
Jazian Gortman * ^{†}	January 29	Texas Legends	Dallas Mavericks	
Chuma Okeke *	February 18	Westchester Knicks	Philadelphia 76ers	
Patrick Baldwin Jr.	February 19	San Diego Clippers	San Antonio Spurs	
Daishen Nix *	February 20	Rio Grande Valley Vipers	Sacramento Kings	
Cole Swider * ^{†}	February 20	South Bay Lakers	Detroit Pistons	
Erik Stevenson *	February 22	Capital City Go-Go	Washington Wizards	
Jahlil Okafor *	February 25	Indiana Mad Ants	Indiana Pacers	
Jaylen Nowell *	February 26	Capital City Go-Go	Washington Wizards	
Mo Bamba	March 1	Birmingham Squadron	Utah Jazz	
Johnny Davis	March 2	Westchester Knicks	Memphis Grizzlies	
Moses Brown * ^{†}	March 3	Westchester Knicks	Dallas Mavericks	
Jalen Crutcher * ^{†}	March 4	Birmingham Squadron	New Orleans Pelicans	
Kevon Harris *	March 6	College Park Skyhawks	Atlanta Hawks	
Kylor Kelley * ^{†}	March 8	South Bay Lakers	Dallas Mavericks	
Malachi Flynn *	March 11	Austin Spurs	Charlotte Hornets	
Skal Labissière *	March 14	Stockton Kings	Sacramento Kings	
Chuma Okeke *	March 26	Westchester Knicks	Philadelphia 76ers	
Terry Taylor *	March 28	Stockton Kings	Sacramento Kings	

=== Going abroad ===
The following players were previously on NBA rosters, but chose to sign with abroad teams after their contract expired and they became free agents. The list also includes unsigned 2024 draft picks who signed with overseas teams, but excludes unsigned 2023 draft picks who were already playing overseas before the draft.

	Denotes players whose NBA contract status is unsigned draft pick
*	Denotes international players who returned to their home country
^{†}	Denotes players who were on a two-way contract

Player	Date signed	New team	New country	Former NBA team	Ref
Frank Ntilikina	June 20	Partizan Mozzart Bet	Serbia	Charlotte Hornets	
Admiral Schofield ^{†}	June 28	LDLC ASVEL	France	Orlando Magic	
Jerome Robinson ^{†}	July 3	Saint-Quentin	France	Golden State Warriors	
Ish Wainright ^{†}	July 10	Hapoel Tel Aviv	Israel	Phoenix Suns	
Yuta Watanabe *	July 11	Chiba Jets Funabashi	Japan	Memphis Grizzlies	
Patrick Beverley	July 16	Hapoel Tel Aviv	Israel	Milwaukee Bucks	
Melvin Ajinça *	July 23	LDLC ASVEL	France	Dallas Mavericks	
Aleksandar Vezenkov	July 25	Olympiacos	Greece	Toronto Raptors	
Jordan Ford ^{†}	July 26	Dolomiti Energia Trento	Italy	Sacramento Kings	
Juan Núñez *	July 26	FC Barcelona	Spain	San Antonio Spurs	
Zavier Simpson	July 26	U-BT Cluj-Napoca	Romania	Memphis Grizzlies	
Chimezie Metu	July 30	FC Barcelona	Spain	Detroit Pistons	
Damian Jones	August 1	Zhejiang Golden Bulls	China	Cleveland Cavaliers	
Xavier Moon ^{†}	August 2	Zenit Saint Petersburg	Russia	Los Angeles Clippers	
Tyrell Terry ^{†}	August 3	Limoges CSP	France	Memphis Grizzlies	
Setric Millner Jr. ^{†}	August 5	Kauhajoki Karhu	Finland	San Antonio Spurs	
Jordan Nwora	August 5	Anadolu Efes	Turkey	Toronto Raptors	
Luka Šamanić	August 5	Fenerbahçe Beko	Turkey	Utah Jazz	
Furkan Korkmaz	August 7	AS Monaco	Monaco	Indiana Pacers	
Timmy Allen	August 8	Filou Oostende	Belgium	Memphis Grizzlies	
Trent Forrest	August 8	Saski Baskonia	Spain	Atlanta Hawks	
Udoka Azubuike ^{†}	August 19	Budućnost VOLI	Montenegro	Phoenix Suns	
Usman Garuba *	August 20	Real Madrid	Spain	Golden State Warriors	
Aleksej Pokuševski *	August 20	Partizan Mozzart Bet	Serbia	Charlotte Hornets	
Duane Washington Jr. ^{†}	August 20	Partizan Mozzart Bet	Serbia	New York Knicks	
Killian Tillie	August 21	Unicaja	Spain	Memphis Grizzlies	
Dylan Windler ^{†}	August 23	Perth Wildcats	Australia	Atlanta Hawks	
Jaylin Galloway * ^{†}	August 26	Sydney Kings	Australia	Milwaukee Bucks	
Saben Lee ^{†}	August 30	Manisa Basket	Turkey	Phoenix Suns	
Ömer Yurtseven	August 30	Panathinaikos AKTOR Athens	Greece	Utah Jazz	
Evan Fournier	September 2	Olympiacos	Greece	Detroit Pistons	
Kobi Simmons	September 3	Maccabi Playtika Tel Aviv	Israel	Toronto Raptors	
Darius Bazley	September 6	Guangdong Southern Tigers	China	Utah Jazz	
Cedi Osman	September 7	Panathinaikos AKTOR Athens	Greece	San Antonio Spurs	
Dāvis Bertāns	September 9	Dubai Basketball	United Arab Emirates	Charlotte Hornets	
Montrezl Harrell	September 12	Adelaide 36ers	Australia	Philadelphia 76ers	
Terquavion Smith ^{†}	September 16	Jiangsu Dragons	China	Philadelphia 76ers	
Javon Freeman-Liberty	September 18	Manisa Basket	Turkey	Toronto Raptors	
Boban Marjanović	September 18	Fenerbahçe Beko	Turkey	Houston Rockets	
RaiQuan Gray ^{†}	September 22	AEK Athens	Greece	Chicago Bulls	
Ashton Hagans ^{†}	September 27	Xinjiang Flying Tigers	China	Portland Trail Blazers	
Troy Brown Jr.	October 11	Manisa Basket	Turkey	Detroit Pistons	
Duane Washington Jr.	October 14	Partizan Mozzart Bet	Serbia	Charlotte Hornets	
Skylar Mays	October 18	Fenerbahçe Beko	Turkey	Minnesota Timberwolves	
Kenneth Lofton Jr.	October 29	Shanghai Sharks	China	Chicago Bulls	
Lonnie Walker IV	October 30	Žalgiris Kaunas	Lithuania	Boston Celtics	
Anžejs Pasečņiks ^{†}	November 5	Tofaş	Turkey	Milwaukee Bucks	
Onuralp Bitim *	November 8	Fenerbahçe Beko	Turkey	Chicago Bulls	
Adonis Arms	November 10	Guangdong Southern Tigers	China	New Orleans Pelicans	
Harry Giles III	November 12	Shanxi Loongs	China	Charlotte Hornets	
Brodric Thomas	November 16	Manisa Basket	Turkey	Sacramento Kings	
Miye Oni	December 16	Joventut Badalona	Spain	Memphis Grizzlies	
PJ Dozier	January 12	Anadolu Efes	Turkey	Minnesota Timberwolves	
Danilo Gallinari	January 22	Vaqueros de Bayamón	Puerto Rico	Milwaukee Bucks	
Bruno Fernando	January 24	Real Madrid	Spain	Toronto Raptors	
JaVale McGee	January 31	Vaqueros de Bayamón	Puerto Rico	Sacramento Kings	
Justin Holiday	February 1	Virtus Segafredo Bologna	Italy	Denver Nuggets	
Daniel Theis	February 17	AS Monaco	France	Oklahoma City Thunder	
Keita Bates-Diop	February 20	Qingdao Eagles	China	Minnesota Timberwolves	
Armel Traoré	February 25	Bàsquet Manresa	Spain	Los Angeles Lakers	
Isaiah Wong	February 26	Žalgiris Kaunas	Lithuania	Charlotte Hornets	
Chris Duarte	March 10	Vaqueros de Bayamón	Puerto Rico	Chicago Bulls	

=== Waived ===
	Denotes player who did not clear waivers because his contract was claimed by another team
^{†}	Denotes players who were on a two-way contract
	Denotes players whose contracts were voided

Player	Date waived	Former team	Ref
Mouhamadou Gueye ^{†}	June 25	Toronto Raptors	
Seth Curry	June 28	Charlotte Hornets	
Buddy Boeheim ^{†}	June 29	Detroit Pistons	
Troy Brown Jr.	June 29	Detroit Pistons	
Chris Paul	June 30	Golden State Warriors	
Ömer Yurtseven	July 1	Utah Jazz	
Marques Bolden ^{†}	July 3	Charlotte Hornets	
Dāvis Bertāns	July 6	Charlotte Hornets	
Devonte' Graham	July 6	Charlotte Hornets	
Bryce McGowens	July 6	Charlotte Hornets	
Aleksej Pokuševski	July 6	Charlotte Hornets	
Paul Reed	July 6	Philadelphia 76ers	
Landry Shamet	July 6	Washington Wizards	
Orlando Robinson	July 7	Miami Heat	
Charles Bassey	July 8	San Antonio Spurs	
RaiQuan Gray ^{†}	July 13	Chicago Bulls	
Russell Westbrook	July 20	Utah Jazz	
Javon Freeman-Liberty	July 22	Toronto Raptors	
Aleksandar Vezenkov	July 22	Toronto Raptors	
Reggie Jackson	July 23	Charlotte Hornets	
Darius Bazley	July 24	Utah Jazz	
Andrew Funk ^{†}	July 24	Chicago Bulls	
Trey Jemison ^{†}	July 24	Memphis Grizzlies	
Kenneth Lofton Jr.	July 24	Utah Jazz	
Zyon Pullin ^{†}	July 25	Miami Heat	
Bruno Fernando	July 30	Atlanta Hawks	
Leaky Black ^{†}	August 1	Charlotte Hornets	
Jaylin Galloway ^{†}	August 1	Milwaukee Bucks	
Taevion Kinsey ^{†}	August 12	Utah Jazz	
Eugene Omoruyi	August 21	Washington Wizards	
Matt Ryan	August 24	New Orleans Pelicans	
Kyle Mangas	August 26	Indiana Pacers	
Cameron McGriff	August 26	Indiana Pacers	
Mamadi Diakite	August 27	Memphis Grizzlies	
Alex Fudge ^{†}	August 27	Dallas Mavericks	
E. J. Liddell	August 27	Phoenix Suns	
Nassir Little	August 27	Phoenix Suns	
Dakota Mathias	August 29	Indiana Pacers	
Jared Brownridge	September 4	Philadelphia 76ers	
Vincent Valerio-Bodon	September 5	Los Angeles Lakers	
Alex Fudge	September 6	Los Angeles Lakers	
Tyson Etienne	September 11	Brooklyn Nets	
Ibou Badji	September 12	Milwaukee Bucks	
Bryson Warren	September 12	Miami Heat	
Malik Williams	September 12	Miami Heat	
Jordan Schakel	September 13	Boston Celtics	
Jamaree Bouyea ^{†}	September 15	San Antonio Spurs	
Blake Hinson ^{†}	September 16	Los Angeles Lakers	
Devon Higgs	September 18	Detroit Pistons	
Sam Peek	September 18	Detroit Pistons	
Yuri Collins	September 20	Golden State Warriors	
Myron Gardner	September 20	Orlando Magic	
AJ Griffin	September 20	Houston Rockets	
Javan Johnson	September 20	Golden State Warriors	
Trevon Scott	September 20	Orlando Magic	
Donta Scott	September 21	Golden State Warriors	
Patrick Gardner	September 22	Brooklyn Nets	
Dylan Disu	September 23	Toronto Raptors	
Joey Hauser	September 23	Atlanta Hawks	
Keshawn Justice	September 23	Utah Jazz	
Derrick Rose	September 23	Memphis Grizzlies	
Quincy Guerrier	September 24	Toronto Raptors	
Gabe Osabuohien	September 24	Cleveland Cavaliers	
Daeqwon Plowden ^{†}	September 24	Golden State Warriors	
Galen Robinson Jr.	September 24	New Orleans Pelicans	
Nae'Qwan Tomlin	September 24	Cleveland Cavaliers	
Philip Alston	September 25	Milwaukee Bucks	
Kennedy Chandler	September 25	Toronto Raptors	
Dexter Dennis	September 25	Sacramento Kings	
Dane Goodwin	September 25	Utah Jazz	
Justin Powell	September 25	Sacramento Kings	
Elijah Harkless	September 26	Los Angeles Clippers	
David Jones ^{†}	September 26	Philadelphia 76ers	
Tyrese Samuel	September 26	Phoenix Suns	
Babacar Sané	September 26	Utah Jazz	
Jaden Shackelford	September 26	Phoenix Suns	
Jordan Bowden	September 27	Atlanta Hawks	
Henri Drell	September 27	Portland Trail Blazers	
Jameer Nelson Jr.	September 27	San Antonio Spurs	
Joirdon Nicholas	September 27	Atlanta Hawks	
Tyler Polley	September 27	Indiana Pacers	
Keisei Tominaga	September 27	Indiana Pacers	
RaeQuan Battle	September 28	Charlotte Hornets	
Marcus Morris Sr.	September 28	New York Knicks	
Chuma Okeke	September 28	New York Knicks	
Chasson Randle	September 28	Minnesota Timberwolves	
Jaylen Sims	September 28	Charlotte Hornets	
Joel Soriano	September 28	Charlotte Hornets	
Josiah-Jordan James	September 29	Indiana Pacers	
Alex Reese	October 31	Oklahoma City Thunder	
Malevy Leons	November 15	Oklahoma City Thunder	
Jaylen Nowell	November 20	New Orleans Pelicans	
Jason Preston ^{†}	November 22	Utah Jazz	
Jared Rhoden ^{†}	November 30	Charlotte Hornets	
Elfrid Payton	December 3	New Orleans Pelicans	
Lester Quiñones ^{†}	December 3	Philadelphia 76ers	
Moses Brown	December 9	Indiana Pacers	
D. J. Carton ^{†}	December 10	Toronto Raptors	
Paul Reed	December 14	Detroit Pistons	
Cui Yongxi ^{†}	December 15	Brooklyn Nets	
Javante McCoy	December 16	Detroit Pistons	
Seth Lundy ^{†}	December 18	Atlanta Hawks	
Matt Ryan	December 22	New York Knicks	
Boo Buie ^{†}	December 24	New York Knicks	
PJ Dozier	December 28	Minnesota Timberwolves	
DJ Steward ^{†}	December 28	Chicago Bulls	
David Jones ^{†}	January 1	Utah Jazz	
Jaylen Martin ^{†}	January 1	Brooklyn Nets	
Tristen Newton ^{†}	January 1	Indiana Pacers	
Daishen Nix ^{†}	January 3	Minnesota Timberwolves	
Cole Swider ^{†}	January 6	Detroit Pistons	
Alondes Williams ^{†}	January 6	Detroit Pistons	
Branden Carlson	January 7	Oklahoma City Thunder	
Bruno Fernando	January 7	Toronto Raptors	
Pete Nance ^{†}	January 7	Philadelphia 76ers	
Orlando Robinson	January 7	Sacramento Kings	
Trey Jemison ^{†}	January 9	New Orleans Pelicans	
Colin Castleton ^{†}	January 10	Memphis Grizzlies	
Quincy Olivari ^{†}	January 15	Los Angeles Lakers	
Jazian Gortman ^{†}	January 26	Dallas Mavericks	
Mo Bamba	February 2	Utah Jazz	
Torrey Craig	February 3	Chicago Bulls	
Chris Duarte	February 3	Chicago Bulls	
Sidy Cissoko	February 6	Washington Wizards	
Reggie Jackson	February 6	Washington Wizards	
Wendell Moore Jr.	February 6	Detroit Pistons	
Pete Nance ^{†}	February 6	Philadelphia 76ers	
Jaden Springer	February 6	Houston Rockets	
Daniel Theis	February 6	Oklahoma City Thunder	
James Wiseman	February 6	Toronto Raptors	
Patrick Baldwin Jr.	February 7	San Antonio Spurs	
David Roddy	February 7	Atlanta Hawks	
Jalen Hood-Schifino	February 7	Utah Jazz	
Armel Traoré ^{†}	February 7	Los Angeles Lakers	
Bones Hyland	February 8	Atlanta Hawks	
Alex Len	February 8	Washington Wizards	
Tazé Moore ^{†}	February 8	Portland Trail Blazers	
Ben Simmons	February 8	Brooklyn Nets	
Josh Richardson	February 9	Utah Jazz	
Christian Wood	February 11	Los Angeles Lakers	
Isaiah Wong ^{†}	February 13	Charlotte Hornets	
Adama Sanogo	February 19	Chicago Bulls	
Javonte Green	February 20	New Orleans Pelicans	
Bojan Bogdanović	February 20	Brooklyn Nets	
Johnny Davis	February 21	Memphis Grizzlies	
Liam Robbins ^{†}	February 28	Milwaukee Bucks	
P. J. Tucker	February 28	Toronto Raptors	
Kai Jones ^{†}	March 1	Los Angeles Clippers	
David Roddy ^{†}	March 1	Philadelphia 76ers	
MarJon Beauchamp	March 2	Los Angeles Clippers	
Jalen Crutcher ^{†}	March 2	New Orleans Pelicans	
Matt Ryan ^{†}	March 2	New York Knicks	
JT Thor ^{†}	March 2	Cleveland Cavaliers	
Jacob Toppin ^{†}	March 2	New York Knicks	
Anton Watson ^{†}	March 2	Boston Celtics	
Cody Zeller	March 2	Houston Rockets	
Kylor Kelley ^{†}	March 3	Dallas Mavericks	
Kendall Brown ^{†}	March 4	Brooklyn Nets	
Cam Reddish	March 27	Los Angeles Lakers	
Orlando Robinson	April 10	Toronto Raptors	
Cole Swider	April 10	Toronto Raptors	

==== Training camp cuts ====
All players listed did not make the final roster.
^{†} On a two-way contract.
^{C} Claimed off waivers by another team.

Atlanta Hawks	Boston Celtics	Brooklyn Nets	Charlotte Hornets	Chicago Bulls
Tony Bradley; Kevon Harris; Jarkel Joiner; Daeqwon Plowden	Tristan Enaruna; Ron Harper Jr.; Jordan Schakel; Jay Scrubb; Dmytro Skapintsev; Lonnie Walker IV; Hason Ward	Mark Armstrong; Amari Bailey; Killian Hayes; KJ Jones II	Charlie Brown Jr.; Marcus Garrett; Harry Giles III; Keyontae Johnson; Caleb McConnell; Duane Washington Jr.	Onuralp Bitim; Ben Coupet Jr.; Marcus Domask; Javon Freeman-Liberty; Kenneth Lofton Jr.; Joshua Primo
Cleveland Cavaliers	Dallas Mavericks	Denver Nuggets	Detroit Pistons	Golden State Warriors
Jules Bernard; Darius Brown II; Jacob Gilyard; Elijah Hughes; Pete Nance; Zhaire Smith	A. J. Lawson^{†}; Jamir Chaplin; Jarod Lucas; Emanuel Miller; Jamarion Sharp	Charles Bediako; Andrew Funk; Gabe McGlothan; Will Richardson; Jaylin Williams; Jahmir Young	Aaron Estrada; Tosan Evbuomwan; Javante McCoy; Dereon Seabron; Tolu Smith; Lamar Stevens	Blake Hinson; Kevin Knox II; Jackson Rowe
Houston Rockets	Indiana Pacers	Los Angeles Clippers	Los Angeles Lakers	Memphis Grizzlies
Matt Bradley; Nate Hinton; Thon Maker; Markquis Nowell; Jermaine Samuels	Kendall Brown; Jahlil Okafor; Cole Swider	Nate Darling; RayJ Dennis; Tosan Evbuomwan; Elijah Harkless; Braxton Key; Alondes Williams	Colin Castleton^{†}; Jordan Goodwin; Kylor Kelley; Grayson Murphy	Armando Bacot; David Johnson; Miles Norris; Miye Oni; Mãozinha Pereira
Miami Heat	Milwaukee Bucks	Minnesota Timberwolves	New Orleans Pelicans	New York Knicks
Caleb Daniels; Nassir Little; Zyon Pullin; Isaiah Stevens; Warren Washington	James Akinjo; Terence Davis; Henry Ellenson; Jalen Lewis; Anžejs Pasečņiks^{†}; Justise Winslow	Keita Bates-Diop; Jaedon LeDee; Skylar Mays; Eugene Omoruyi	Adonis Arms; Izaiah Brockington; Keion Brooks Jr.; Jalen Crutcher; Malcolm Hill^{†}; Trhae Mitchell; Josh Oduro; Elfrid Payton; Matt Ryan	Damion Baugh; Moses Brown; Boo Buie; Alex O'Connell; Chuma Okeke; Landry Shamet; T. J. Warren
Oklahoma City Thunder	Orlando Magic	Philadelphia 76ers	Phoenix Suns	Portland Trail Blazers
Buddy Boeheim; Javonte Cooke; Chase Jeter; Miller Kopp; Malevy Leons; Alex Reese; Cormac Ryan	Robert Baker; Jarrett Culver; Alex Morales; Jalen Slawson; Javonte Smart; Ethan Thompson	Max Fiedler; Judah Mintz; Isaiah Mobley; Jordan Tucker	Mamadi Diakite; Frank Kaminsky; David Stockton; Paul Watson; Moses Wood	James Bouknight; Devonte' Graham; David Muoka; Nick Muszynski
Sacramento Kings	San Antonio Spurs	Toronto Raptors	Utah Jazz	Washington Wizards
Antoine Davis; Boogie Ellis; Skal Labissière; Shareef O'Neal; Terry Taylor; Brodric Thomas; Drew Timme	Brandon Boston Jr.^{C}; Jamaree Bouyea; Malachi Flynn; Nathan Mensah; Jalen McDaniels; Isaiah Miller	Branden Carlson^{†}; Kevin Obanor; Jahmi'us Ramsey; Jared Rhoden^{C}	Max Abmas; Taevion Kinsey; Justin Lewis; Isaiah Wong	Leaky Black; Jared Butler; John Butler Jr.; RayJ Dennis^{†}; Taylor Funk; Mouhamadou Gueye; Kira Lewis Jr.; Jaylen Nowell; Erik Stevenson

== Draft ==
The 2024 NBA draft was held on June 26–27, 2024, at Barclays Center in Brooklyn, New York for round one and at ESPN's Seaport District Studios in Manhattan, New York for round two the following day. In two rounds of the draft, 58 amateur United States college basketball players and other eligible players, including international players, were selected. The following players signed a regular rookie contract unless noted otherwise.

Denotes players who signed a two-way contract
Denotes players whose NBA two-way contract was upgraded to standard NBA contract
Denotes players who are expected to play abroad
Denotes players who are expected to play in the NBA G League without signing an NBA contract

=== First round ===
Pick	Player	Date signed	Team (Note: Team denotes the team that holds the players' draft rights at the time of contract signing. Teams in parentheses denotes the teams that drafted the players before any trade occurred.)	Ref
1	Zaccharie Risacher	July 6	Atlanta Hawks	
2	Alex Sarr	July 6	Washington Wizards	
3	Reed Sheppard	July 2	Houston Rockets	
4	Stephon Castle	July 2	San Antonio Spurs	
5	Ron Holland	July 6	Detroit Pistons	
6	Tidjane Salaün	July 3	Charlotte Hornets	
7	Donovan Clingan	July 4	Portland Trail Blazers	
8	Rob Dillingham	July 8	Minnesota Timberwolves (rights acquired from San Antonio)	
9	Zach Edey	July 6	Memphis Grizzlies	
10	Cody Williams	July 2	Utah Jazz	
11	Matas Buzelis	July 2	Chicago Bulls	
12	Nikola Topić	July 7	Oklahoma City Thunder	
13	Devin Carter	July 9	Sacramento Kings	
14	Bub Carrington	July 7	Washington Wizards (rights acquired from Portland)	
15	Kel'el Ware	July 1	Miami Heat	
16	Jared McCain	July 4	Philadelphia 76ers	
17	Dalton Knecht	July 2	Los Angeles Lakers	
18	Tristan da Silva	July 6	Orlando Magic	
19	Ja'Kobe Walter	July 4	Toronto Raptors	
20	Jaylon Tyson	July 2	Cleveland Cavaliers	
21	Yves Missi	July 8	New Orleans Pelicans	
22	DaRon Holmes II	July 9	Denver Nuggets (rights acquired from Phoenix)	
23	AJ Johnson	July 5	Milwaukee Bucks	
24	Kyshawn George	July 6	Washington Wizards (rights acquired from New York)	
25	Pacôme Dadiet	July 3	New York Knicks	
26	Dillon Jones	July 6	Oklahoma City Thunder (rights acquired from New York through Washington)	
27	Terrence Shannon Jr.	July 8	Minnesota Timberwolves	
28	Ryan Dunn	July 2	Phoenix Suns (rights acquired from Denver)	
29	Isaiah Collier	July 2	Utah Jazz	
30	Baylor Scheierman	July 6	Boston Celtics	

=== Second round ===
Pick	Player	Date signed	Team	Ref
31	Jonathan Mogbo	July 4	Toronto Raptors	
32	Kyle Filipowski	August 12	Utah Jazz	
33	Tyler Smith	July 5	Milwaukee Bucks	
34	Tyler Kolek	July 4	New York Knicks (rights acquired from Portland)	
35	Johnny Furphy	July 6	Indiana Pacers (rights acquired from San Antonio)	
36	Juan Núñez	—	San Antonio Spurs (rights acquired from Indiana)	
37	Bobi Klintman	July 12	Detroit Pistons (rights acquired from Minnesota)	
38	Ajay Mitchell	July 6	Oklahoma City Thunder (rights acquired from New York Knicks)	
39	Jaylen Wells	July 6	Memphis Grizzlies	
40	Oso Ighodaro	July 4	Phoenix Suns (rights acquired from New York through Portland and Oklahoma City)	
41	Adem Bona	July 21	Philadelphia 76ers	
42	KJ Simpson	July 7	Charlotte Hornets	
43	Nikola Đurišić	—	Atlanta Hawks (rights acquired from Miami)	
44	Pelle Larsson	July 2	Miami Heat (rights acquired from Houston)	
45	Jamal Shead	July 4	Toronto Raptors (rights acquired from Sacramento)	
46	Cam Christie	July 5	Los Angeles Clippers	
47	Antonio Reeves	July 22	New Orleans Pelicans (rights acquired from Orlando)	
48	Harrison Ingram	July 29	San Antonio Spurs	
Philadelphia 76ers (forfeited)
49	Tristen Newton	July 27	Indiana Pacers	
50	Enrique Freeman	August 8	Indiana Pacers	
51	Melvin Ajinça	—	Dallas Mavericks (rights acquired from Washington through New York)	
52	Quinten Post	September 26	Golden State Warriors (rights acquired from Portland through Golden State and Oklahoma City)	
53	Cam Spencer	July 8	Memphis Grizzlies (rights acquired from Detroit through Minnesota)	
54	Anton Watson	August 2	Boston Celtics	
55	Bronny James	July 2	Los Angeles Lakers	
56	Kevin McCullar Jr.	August 5	New York Knicks (rights acquired from Phoenix through Denver)	
57	Ulrich Chomche	July 9	Toronto Raptors (rights acquired from Memphis)	
Phoenix Suns (forfeited)
58	Ariel Hukporti	July 8	New York Knicks (rights acquired from Dallas)	

=== Previous years' draftees ===
Draft	Pick	Player	Date signed	Team	Previous team	Ref
2022	52	Karlo Matković	July 12	New Orleans Pelicans	Birmingham Squadron (NBA G League)	
2022	56	Luke Travers	August 28	Cleveland Cavaliers	Melbourne United (Australia)	
