= Devon Higgs =

American basketball player (born 2000)

No. 11 – College Park Skyhawks
- Position: Shooting guard
- League: NBA G League

Personal information
- Born: February 10, 2000 (age 26) Suwanee, Georgia, U.S.
- Listed height: 6 ft 5 in (1.96 m)
- Listed weight: 198 lb (90 kg)

Career information
- High school: Peachtree Ridge (Suwanee, Georgia)
- College: Georgia Southwestern State (2018–2023)
- NBA draft: 2023: undrafted
- Playing career: 2023–present

Career history
- 2023–2024: College Park Skyhawks
- 2024–2025: Motor City Cruise
- 2025: Greensboro Swarm
- 2025: Kožuv
- 2026: Atlético Cordón Montevideo
- 2026–present: College Park Skyhawks
- Stats at NBA.com
- Stats at Basketball Reference

Devon Tommie Higgs (born February 10, 2000) is an American professional basketball player for the College Park Skyhawks of the NBA G League. He played college basketball for the Georgia Southwestern State Hurricanes.

== High school and college career ==
After playing high school basketball at Peachtree Ridge at his native Suwanee, Georgia, Higgs played five collegiate seasons for the Georgia Southwestern State Hurricanes. In 118 games, he averaged 7.3 points, 5.4 rebounds and 1.6 assists in 22.6 minutes per game and as a senior, he played 25 games while averaging 9 points and 5.6 rebounds in 26 minutes while shooting 51.5% from the field.

== Professional career ==
=== College Park Skyhawks (2023–2024) ===
After going undrafted in the 2023 NBA draft, Higgs joined the College Park Skyhawks on October 29, 2023, but was waived on November 6. On December 30, he re-joined the SkyHawks and was waived on January 25, 2024. He played nine games while averaging 4.1 points, 2.9 rebounds and 0.8 assists in 15.6 minutes per game.

=== Motor City Cruise (2024–2025) ===
On January 30, 2024, Higgs joined the Motor City Cruise where he played in 17 games and averaged 7.2 points, 4.6 rebounds, 1.2 assists and 1.2 blocks in 22.8 minutes.

After joining them for the 2024 NBA Summer League, Higgs signed with the Detroit Pistons on September 17, 2024, but was waived the next day. On October 29, he re-joined Motor City, playing in 18 games and averaging 4.1 points, 1.9 rebounds and 1.3 assists in 13.8 minutes. On January 15, 2025, he was waived by Motor City.

=== Second stint with College Park Skyhawks (2026–present) ===
On September 8, 2026, Higgs signed a training camp contract with the Atlanta Hawks. He was waived by the Hawks the following day.

== Personal life ==
He is the son of Mallery Ivy-Higgs and Derek Higgs (Robyn Higgs-wife) Devon has two brothers and 1 sister. He attended Georgia Southwestern, where he majored in Business Management. He resides in Lawrenceville, GA.
