= Max Fiedler (basketball) =

American basketball player (born 2001)

Free Agent
- Position: Center / power forward

Personal information
- Born: February 26, 2001 (age 25) Indialantic, Florida, U.S.
- Listed height: 6 ft 11 in (2.11 m)
- Listed weight: 230 lb (104 kg)

Career information
- High school: Melbourne (Melbourne, Florida)
- College: Rice (2019–2024)
- NBA draft: 2024: undrafted
- Playing career: 2024–present

Career history
- 2024–2025: Delaware Blue Coats
- 2025: Texas Legends
- 2025-present: BC Oostende

Career highlights
- Second-team All-CUSA (2023)
- Stats at NBA.com
- Stats at Basketball Reference

Max Berning Fiedler (born February 26, 2001) is an American professional basketball player who last played for BC Oostende of the BNXT League. He previously played for the Texas Legends of the NBA G League. He played college basketball for the Rice Owls.

== High school career ==
Fiedler attended Melbourne High School in Melbourne, Florida, where he averaged 21.6 points, 14.3 rebounds and 2.5 blocks as a senior, helping the Bulldogs reach a 25–5 record while leading them to the District 6-8A championship and a spot in the FHSAA playoffs.

== College career ==
Fiedler played college basketball for Rice where he averaged 9.3 points, 7.7 rebounds, and 3.9 assists in five seasons, finishing his career as the Owl's all-time leader in rebounds (1,144), assists (571), field goal percentage (65.8%), games played (148), and games started (135) while ranking second all-time in total blocks with 125.

In his last season, Fiedler became the first player to record 1,000 career points, 1,000 rebounds, 500 assists, 100 blocks, and 100 steals.

== Professional career ==
After going undrafted in the 2024 NBA draft, Fiedler joined the Philadelphia 76ers for the 2024 NBA Summer League and on August 31, 2024, he signed with the team on an Exhibit 10 deal. However, he was waived on October 17. On October 28, he joined the Delaware Blue Coats.

On January 6, 2025, Fiedler was traded to the Texas Legends.

In July 2025, Fiedler signed with BC Oostende of the Basketball Champions League.

== Career statistics ==
Legend
GP	Games played	GS	Games started	MPG	Minutes per game
FG%	Field goal percentage	3P%	3-point field goal percentage	FT%	Free throw percentage
RPG	Rebounds per game	APG	Assists per game	SPG	Steals per game
BPG	Blocks per game	PPG	Points per game	**Bold**	Career high

=== College ===
Year	Team	GP	GS	MPG	FG%	3P%	FT%	RPG	APG	SPG	BPG	PPG
2019–20	Rice	20	7	12.4	.558	.000	.625	4.1	.7	.3	.7	2.7
2020–21	Rice	28	28	28	.675	.000	.702	8.8	3.6	**.9**	.8	**11.2**
2021–22	Rice	33	33	25.5	.575	**.500**	**.711**	7.7	3.5	.8	.8	9.9
2022–23	Rice	**35**	**35**	**30.4**	**.735**	.000	.588	7.6	5.0	.8	**1.1**	11.1
2023–24	Rice	32	32	29.9	.663	.000	.612	**9.3**	**5.3**	.8	.8	9.3
Career		148	135	26.3	.658	.133	.658	7.7	3.9	.8	.8	9.3

== Personal life ==
Fiedler is the son of Tristan and Sandy Fiedler, and the nephew of former NFL player Brian Bollinger.
