= Philip Alston (basketball) =

American basketball player (born 2001)

Free agent
- Position: Power forward

Personal information
- Born: August 7, 2001 (age 25) Columbus, Ohio, U.S.
- Listed height: 6 ft 6 in (1.98 m)
- Listed weight: 235 lb (107 kg)

Career information
- High school: Westerville North (Westerville, Ohio)
- College: California (PA) (2019–2022); Loyola Chicago (2022–2024)
- NBA draft: 2024: undrafted
- Playing career: 2024–present

Career history
- 2024–2025: Wisconsin Herd
- 2026: Uni Baskets Münster

Career highlights
- Third-team All-Atlantic 10 (2024); First-team All-PSAC West (2022)
- Stats at NBA.com
- Stats at Basketball Reference

Philip Alston (born August 7, 2001) is an American professional basketball player He played college basketball for the California Vulcans and the Loyola Ramblers.

== High school career ==
Alston attended Westerville North High School in Westerville, Ohio where he played under coach Shannon Trusley for three years where he earned second team all-conference and honorable mention all-district awards as a junior and as a senior. He was a team captain in his senior season and helped his squad reaching a conference title.

== College career ==
Alston began playing college basketball for the California Vulcans where he averaged 21.0 points and 10.8 rebounds per game as a sophomore while ranking second in Division II hoops with 21 double-doubles and was an All-American, all of this after going into cardiac arrest during a scrimmage as a freshman.

In 2022, Alston transferred to the Loyola Ramblers where in his first season he led the team in scoring, with 14.6 points per game, and rebounding, with 5.6 rebounds. He scored in double-figures 25 times and had three double-doubles. As a senior, he earned All-Atlantic 10 Third Team honors after leading the Ramblers in scoring with 12.6 points per game while shooting just north of 45 percent from the field and averaging 4.6 rebounds, 0.8 assists, 0.6 steals, and 0.7 blocks per game. He scored at least 20 points five times that season, including a season-best 27 points at South Florida and posted one double-double with a 21-point, 10 rebound game at Rhode Island.

== Professional career ==
=== Wisconsin Herd (2024–2025) ===
After going undrafted in the 2024 NBA draft, Alston joined the Milwaukee Bucks for the 2024 NBA Summer League and on September 17, 2024, he signed with the team. However, he was waived eight days later and joined the Wisconsin Herd on October 28. On November 29, he left the Herd after going season-ending surgery to repair a torn ligament in his hand. He played in five games while averaging 6.0 points and 4.0 rebounds in 19.3 minutes per game. On November 7, 2025, Alston was named to the Wisconsin Herd opening night roster.

== Personal life ==
The son of Anthony and D’Metria Alston, he has two brothers and one sister. He majored in business administration.
