= Javante McCoy =

American basketball player (born 1998)

No. 13 – Balkan Botevgrad
- Position: Shooting guard / point guard
- League: NBL; EuroCup

Personal information
- Born: January 24, 1998 (age 28) Milwaukee, Wisconsin, U.S.
- Listed height: 6 ft 5 in (1.96 m)
- Listed weight: 190 lb (86 kg)

Career information
- High school: Wakeland (Frisco, Texas); Phillips Exeter Academy (Exeter, New Hampshire)
- College: Boston University (2017–2022)
- NBA draft: 2022: undrafted
- Playing career: 2022–present

Career history
- 2022–2023: South Bay Lakers
- 2023–2024: Austin Spurs
- 2024–2025: Motor City Cruise
- 2025–2026: Grand Rapids Gold
- 2026: Elitzur Netanya
- 2026–present: Balkan Botevgrad

Career highlights
- Third-team All-Patriot League (2020); Second-team All-Patriot League (2021); First-team All-Patriot League (2022)
- Stats at NBA.com
- Stats at Basketball Reference

Javante McCoy (born January 24, 1998) is an American professional basketball player for Balkan Botevgrad of the Bulgarian National Basketball League (NBL) and the EuroCup. He played college basketball for the Boston University Terriers.

== High school career ==
McCoy played high school basketball for the Big Red at Phillips Exeter Academy in Exeter, New Hampshire in his post-grad year. He earned 2017 Class A All-District First Team honors. He was named a 2016 All-District First-Team member at Wakeland High School in Frisco, Texas. He averaged 15.3 points, 3.1 rebounds and 2.6 assists.

== College career ==
McCoy played at Boston University for five seasons. He averaged 12.2 points and 2.7 rebounds per game as a junior. As a senior, McCoy averaged 16.1 points per game, earning Second Team All-Patriot League honors. In his fifth season, he averaged 17.4 points, 3.9 rebounds and 2.9 assists per game. He was named to the First Team All-Patriot League.

== Professional career ==
=== South Bay Lakers (2022–2023) ===
After going undrafted in the 2022 NBA draft, McCoy joined the Los Angeles Lakers for the 2022 NBA Summer League and on July 24, 2022, he signed with them, but was waived on October 8. On October 22, he joined the South Bay Lakers.

=== Austin Spurs (2023–2024) ===
On September 18, McCoy signed with the San Antonio Spurs, but was waived two days later and on October 31, he joined the Austin Spurs.

=== Motor City Cruise (2024–2025) ===
On September 18, 2024, McCoy signed with the Detroit Pistons, but was waived on October 17. On October 29, he joined the Motor City Cruise and on December 15, he, once again, signed with the Pistons, but was waived the next day. On December 19, he returned to the Cruise. However, he was let go on January 5, 2025, after suffering a season-ending injury.

=== Balkan Botevgrad (2026–present) ===
On August 19, 2026, McCoy signed with Balkan Botevgrad of the Bulgarian National Basketball League (NBL).

== Personal life ==
McCoy is the son of Cary and William McCoy. He has two sisters, Adrianna and Samantha.

== Career statistics ==
Legend
GP	Games played	GS	Games started	MPG	Minutes per game
FG%	Field goal percentage	3P%	3-point field goal percentage	FT%	Free throw percentage
RPG	Rebounds per game	APG	Assists per game	SPG	Steals per game
BPG	Blocks per game	PPG	Points per game	**Bold**	Career high
*	Led the league

=== College ===
Year	Team	GP	GS	MPG	FG%	3P%	FT%	RPG	APG	SPG	BPG	PPG
2017–18	Boston University	31	27	25.6	.444	**.435**	.648	2.6	1.7	.9	.2	8.9
2018–19	Boston University	32	30	29.6	.429	.386	**.806**	3.1	2.3	1.0	.2	12.1
2019–20	Boston University	33	31	30.6	.413	.279	.735	2.7	**3.4**	.7	.2	12.2
2020–21	Boston University	16	15	31.2	.485	.313	.785	**4.6**	2.2	.8	**.3**	16.1
2021–22	Boston University	**35**	**35**	**34.0**	**.495**	.425	.708	3.9	2.9	**1.1**	.2	**17.4**
Career		147	138	30.2	.454	.377	.738	3.3	2.6	.9	.2	13.1
