= Sam Peek =

American basketball player (born 1999)

Free agent
- Position: Shooting guard / small forward

Personal information
- Born: June 11, 1999 (age 27) Poughkeepsie, New York, U.S.
- Listed height: 6 ft 7 in (2.01 m)
- Listed weight: 195 lb (88 kg)

Career information
- High school: Spackenkill (Poughkeepsie, New York); Trinity-Pawling (Pawling, New York)
- College: Wesleyan (2018–2022); Stetson (2022–2023)
- NBA draft: 2023: undrafted
- Playing career: 2023–present

Career history
- 2023–2024: Wisconsin Herd
- 2024–2025: Motor City Cruise
- 2025–2026: Vitória

Career highlights
- NESCAC player of the year (2022); First-team All-NESCAC (2022)
- Stats at NBA.com
- Stats at Basketball Reference

Sam Peek (born June 11, 1999) is an American professional basketball player who last played for the Vitória of the Liga Portuguesa de Basquetebol. He played college basketball for the Wesleyan Cardinals and the Stetson Hatters.

== High school and college career ==
Peek initially began his high school career at Spackenkill High School at Poughkeepsie, New York before transferring to Trinity-Pawling at Pawling, New York. Afterwards, he began his college career at Wesleyan, where he earned All-America honors in his last season after averaging 17.9 points and 7.0 rebounds, which led the Cardinals, all while shooting 50.3 percent from the floor. Afterwards, he transferred to Stetson where he played 31 games and averaged 5.8 points, 4.0 rebounds and 0.7 assists in 18.3 minutes.

== Professional career ==
=== Wisconsin Herd (2023–2024) ===
After going undrafted in the 2023 NBA draft, Peek joined the Wisconsin Herd on October 30, 2023, but was waived in November. However, he re-joined the Herd on December 4, playing in 10 games and averaging 2.9 points, 2.8 rebounds and 1.0 assist in 15.5 minutes, before being waived once again on January 14, 2024.

=== Motor City Cruise (2024–2025) ===
On February 8, 2024, Peek joined the Motor City Cruise, but was waived two days later, before rejoining the Cruise on February 12. On 14 games, he averaged 6.2 points, 3.0 rebounds and 1.3 assists in 20.0 minutes.

After joining them for the 2024 NBA Summer League, Peek signed with the Detroit Pistons on September 17, 2024, but was waived the next day. On October 29, he rejoined the Cruise.

== Personal life ==
Peek has a brother and a sister.
