= Ben Coupet Jr. =

American basketball player (born 1998)

No. 15 – Grand Rapids Gold
- Position: Shooting guard / small forward
- League: NBA G League

Personal information
- Born: January 25, 1998 (age 28) Chicago, Illinois, U.S.
- Listed height: 6 ft 7 in (2.01 m)
- Listed weight: 185 lb (84 kg)

Career information
- High school: Simeon Career Academy (Chatham, Illinois)
- College: UNLV (2016–2019); Little Rock (2019–2021); Southern Illinois (2021–2022)
- NBA draft: 2022: undrafted
- Playing career: 2022–present

Career history
- 2022–2025: Windy City Bulls
- 2025–2026: Noblesville Boom
- 2026–present: Grand Rapids Gold
- Stats at NBA.com
- Stats at Basketball Reference

Ben Alonzo Coupet Jr. (born January 25, 1998) is an American professional basketball player for the Grand Rapids Gold of the NBA G League. He played college basketball for the UNLV Runnin' Rebels, Little Rock Trojans and the Southern Illinois Salukis.

== High school career ==
Coupet attended Simeon Career Academy in Chatham, Illinois helping them win the state championship in 2013 and the city championship in 2016. He averaged 10 points and four rebounds per game as a senior, being a three-star prospect by Rivals and 247 Sports and a three star recruit from ESPN, being ranked as the number 39 small forward in his class.

== College career ==
Coupet began his career with UNLV where he spent three seasons and appeared in 18 games for the Runnin' Rebels, starting two of them. He transferred afterwards to Little Rock, starting all 57 games while averaging 10.8 points on 45 percent shooting from the field and 37 percent shooting from the 3-point line. As a junior, he averaged 11.2 points and 4.7 rebounds, leading the Trojans to a 21-win season and a conference championship while as a senior, he averaged again double figures while being named the Lou Henson National Mid-Major Player of the Week and Sun Belt Player of the Week after averaging 26.5 points on 77 percent shooting in two conference wins.

In 2021, Coupet transferred to Southern Illinois, where he appeared in 31 games and averaged 11.0 points, 4.6 rebounds, and a 41.1 percent clip from behind the arc.

== Professional career ==
After going undrafted in the 2022 NBA draft, Coupet joined the Windy City Bulls on October 23, 2022, after a tryout. He played 30 games while averaging 5.0 points, 1.5 rebounds and 0.5 assists in 12.8 minutes.

On November 2, 2023, Coupet re-joined Windy City where he played in 42 games and averaged 6.5 points, 2.8 rebounds and 0.7 assists in 19.5 minutes.

After joining them for the 2024 NBA Summer League, Coupet signed with the Chicago Bulls on October 6, 2024, being waived the same day and on October 28, he re-joined Windy City.

On October 25, 2025, Coupet was selected by the Noblesville Boom in the 2025 NBA G League draft.

== Personal life ==
The son of DeLisa Carter and Ben Coupet Sr., he has two brothers. He earned two college degrees and pursued a master's degree at SIU.
