= 2025 NBA All-Star Game =

All-star single-elimination basketball tournament

	1	Total
OGs	41	41
Global Stars	25	25
- Date: February 16, 2025
- Arena: Chase Center
- City: San Francisco
- MVP: Stephen Curry (Shaq's OGs)
- National anthem: Dennis R. Rodriguez (American); Alessia Cara (Canadian)
- Halftime show: DJ Cassidy, E-40, Too $hort, Saweetie, and En Vogue
- Attendance: 17,539
- Network: TNT truTV; TBS (as all-star game)
- Announcers: Brian Anderson, Reggie Miller, Ernie Johnson, and Kevin Hart (All-Star Game); Kevin Harlan, Reggie Miller, Kenny Smith, Vince Carter, and Allie LaForce (All-Star Saturday Night); Adam Lefkoe, Candace Parker, Vince Carter, and Taylor Rooks (Rising Stars Tournament)

Final positions
- Champions: Shaq's OGs
- Runners-up: Chuck's Global Stars

NBA All-Star Game
< 2024	2026 >

The 2025 NBA All-Star Championship was an all-star single-elimination basketball tournament played on February 16, 2025, during the National Basketball Association's 2024–25 season. It was the 74th edition of the NBA All-Star Game. It was hosted by the Golden State Warriors at Chase Center. It was the fourth time the Warriors hosted the game and the first time since 2000, when the NBA All-Star game was played at the Oakland Arena in Oakland, California. The Warriors also hosted the game in 1960, as the Philadelphia Warriors at the Convention Hall in Philadelphia and in 1967, as the San Francisco Warriors at the Cow Palace in Daly City. This was the first time that the NBA All-Star Game was held in San Francisco. The All-Star Game was televised nationally by TNT for the 23rd and final consecutive year, before returning to NBC (which aired the game for 11 years prior to TNT taking over coverage) in the next season.

The All-Star championship itself consisted of a four-team single-elimination tournament as two semi-finals and a championship game, similar to the most recent NHL All-Star Games and Rising Stars Challenges. Three teams were drafted from a pool of twenty-four selected all-stars by NBA on TNT analysts Shaquille O'Neal, Kenny Smith, and Charles Barkley, while Candace Parker, also a TNT analyst, managed the winning team from the Rising Stars Challenge (which has used a four-team tournament since 2022). Shaq's OGs defeated Chuck's Global Stars to win the tournament. Stephen Curry was named the All-Star Most Valuable Player (MVP).

== Background ==
The Chase Center in San Francisco was announced to host the All-Star Game on November 6, 2023, at a press conference held by the Golden State Warriors. In attendance at the announcement were NBA commissioner Adam Silver, Warriors Co-Executive chairman & chief executive officer Joe Lacob, Warriors Co-Executive chairman Peter Guber, Warriors President and chief operating officer Brandon Schneider, and San Francisco Mayor London Breed.

== Format change ==
On December 17, 2024, the NBA announced that the All-Star Game would use a four-team tournament format with a championship, similar to the format used by the Rising Stars Challenge since 2022. Each of the teams will consist of 8 players, with the traditional pool of selected all-stars drafted for the first three teams by NBA on TNT analysts Charles Barkley, Shaquille O'Neal and Kenny Smith (who will be honorary general managers of each team, to be known as Team Chuck, Team Shaq, and Team Kenny, respectively). The fourth team in the tournament will be the winner of the Rising Stars Challenge, with their honorary general manager being Candace Parker (and therefore known as Team Candace). The head coaches for each team will be chosen from the coaching staffs of the teams with the best regular season records in each conference, based on games played through February 2, 2025. The head coach of the top team in each conference will coach one of the All-Star teams, while their assistant coach will coach either the remaining All-Star team or the Rising Stars winner. The winner of each game will be the first team to score 40 points.

== All-Star Game ==
=== Coaches ===
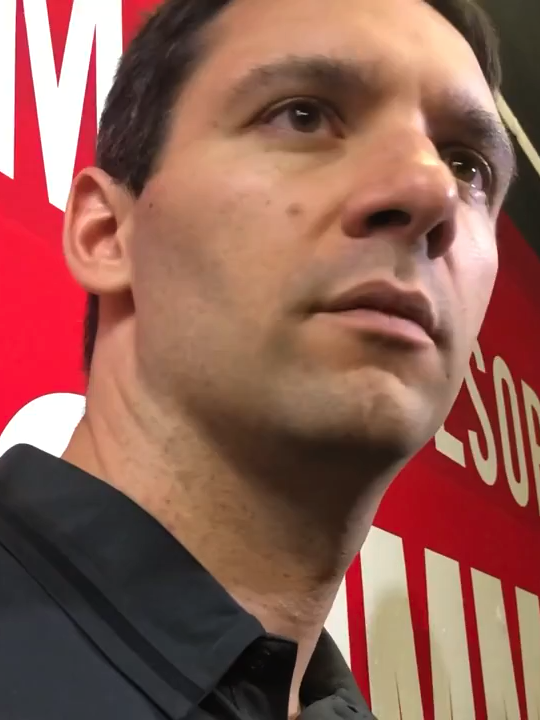
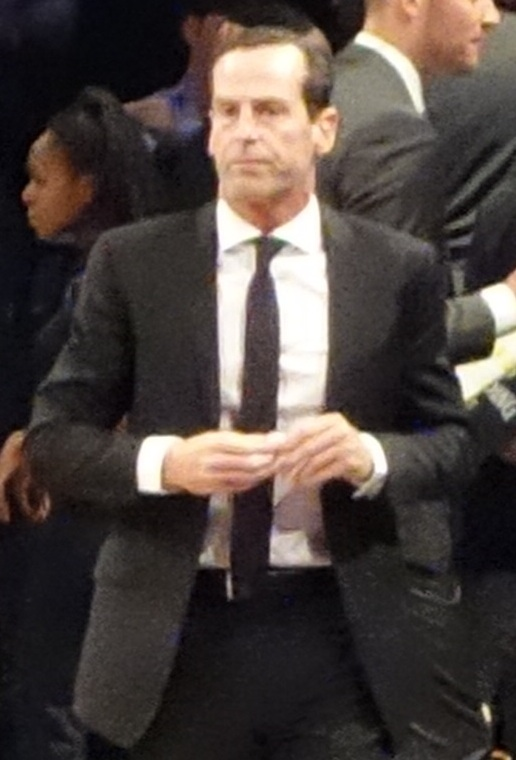
Oklahoma City Thunder's Mark Daigneault (left) and Cleveland Cavaliers' Kenny Atkinson (right) were selected as the All-Star Game head coaches.

Mark Daigneault, head coach of Western Conference leader Oklahoma City Thunder, earned a coaching spot on January 19. Kenny Atkinson, head coach of Eastern Conference leader Cleveland Cavaliers, earned a coaching spot on January 23. Jordan Ott and Dave Bliss, assistant coach from the Cavaliers and Thunder, respectively, filled the two remaining coaching spots.

=== Rosters ===
As had been the case in previous years, the rosters for the All-Star Game were selected through a voting process. The fans could vote through the NBA website as well as through their Google account. The starters were chosen by the fans, media, and current NBA players. Fans made up 50% of the vote, and NBA players and media each comprised 25% of the vote. The two guards and three frontcourt players who received the highest cumulative vote totals in each conference were named the All-Star starters and two players in each conference with the highest votes were named team captains. NBA head coaches voted for the reserves for their respective conferences, none of which could be players from their own team. Each coach selected two guards, three frontcourt players and two wild cards, with each selected player ranked in order of preference within each category. If a multi-position player was to be selected, coaches were encouraged to vote for the player at the position that was "most advantageous for the All-Star team", regardless of where the player was listed on the All-Star ballot or the position he was listed in box scores.

The All-Star Game starters were announced on January 23, 2025. Donovan Mitchell of the Cleveland Cavaliers and Jalen Brunson of the New York Knicks were announced as the starting guards in the East, earning their sixth and second all-star appearances, respectively. Giannis Antetokounmpo of the Milwaukee Bucks and Jayson Tatum of the Boston Celtics were named the frontcourt starters in the East, earning their ninth and sixth all-star appearances, respectively. Joining the East frontcourt was Karl-Anthony Towns of the New York Knicks, his fifth selection.

In the West, Shai Gilgeous-Alexander of the Oklahoma City Thunder and Stephen Curry of the Golden State Warriors were named to the starting backcourt, earning their third and eleventh all-star appearances, respectively. In the frontcourt, Kevin Durant of the Phoenix Suns and LeBron James of the Los Angeles Lakers were named to their 15th and 21st all-star appearances, respectively. James' 21st All-Star selection increased his NBA record for most All-Star selections. With his selection, James also joins the short list of players with 21 or more All-Star selections which includes Hall of Fame hockey player Gordie Howe and Baseball Hall of Famers Hank Aaron, Willie Mays, and Stan Musial. Joining the West frontcourt was Nikola Jokić of the Denver Nuggets, earning his seventh selection.

The All-Star Game reserves were announced on January 30, 2025. The West reserves included Anthony Edwards of the Minnesota Timberwolves, his third selection; Anthony Davis of the Los Angeles Lakers (who was traded to the Dallas Mavericks on February 2), his tenth selection; James Harden of the Los Angeles Clippers, his eleventh selection; Jaren Jackson Jr. of the Memphis Grizzlies, his second selection; Alperen Şengün of the Houston Rockets, his first selection; Jalen Williams of the Oklahoma City Thunder, his first selection; and Victor Wembanyama of the San Antonio Spurs, his first selection.

The East reserves included Damian Lillard of the Milwaukee Bucks, his ninth selection; Darius Garland of the Cleveland Cavaliers, his second selection; Jaylen Brown of the Boston Celtics, his fourth selection; Cade Cunningham of the Detroit Pistons, his first selection; Tyler Herro of the Miami Heat, his first selection; Evan Mobley of the Cleveland Cavaliers, his first selection; and Pascal Siakam of the Indiana Pacers, his third selection.

- Italics indicates leading vote-getters per conference

Eastern Conference All-Stars
Pos	Player	Team	No. of selections
Starters
G	Jalen Brunson	New York Knicks	2
G	Donovan Mitchell	Cleveland Cavaliers	6
F	Jayson Tatum	Boston Celtics	6
F	Giannis Antetokounmpo^{INJ1}	Milwaukee Bucks	9
C	Karl-Anthony Towns	New York Knicks	5
Reserves
F	Jaylen Brown	Boston Celtics	4
G	Cade Cunningham	Detroit Pistons	1
G	Darius Garland	Cleveland Cavaliers	2
G	Tyler Herro	Miami Heat	1
G	Damian Lillard	Milwaukee Bucks	9
F	Evan Mobley	Cleveland Cavaliers	1
F	Pascal Siakam	Indiana Pacers	3
G	Trae Young^{REP1}	Atlanta Hawks	4

Western Conference All-Stars
Pos	Player	Team	No. of selections
Starters
G	Shai Gilgeous-Alexander	Oklahoma City Thunder	3
G	Stephen Curry	Golden State Warriors	11
F	LeBron James^{INJ3}	Los Angeles Lakers	21
F	Kevin Durant	Phoenix Suns	15
C	Nikola Jokić	Denver Nuggets	7
Reserves
G	Anthony Edwards^{INJ4}	Minnesota Timberwolves	3
G	James Harden	Los Angeles Clippers	11
F	Jaren Jackson Jr.	Memphis Grizzlies	2
F	Jalen Williams	Oklahoma City Thunder	1
C	Anthony Davis^{INJ2}	Dallas Mavericks^{NOTE1}	10
C	Alperen Şengün	Houston Rockets	1
C	Victor Wembanyama	San Antonio Spurs	1
G	Kyrie Irving^{REP2}	Dallas Mavericks	9

^NOTE1 After being announced as an All-Star, Anthony Davis was traded from the Los Angeles Lakers to the Dallas Mavericks.
^INJ1 Giannis Antetokounmpo was unable to play due to a leg injury.
^REP1 Trae Young was selected as Giannis Antetokounmpo's replacement.
^INJ2 Anthony Davis was unable to play due to an injury.
^REP2 Kyrie Irving was selected as Anthony Davis' replacement.
^INJ3 LeBron James was unable to play due to an ankle injury, ending his streak of consecutive All-Star starts at 20. No replacement due to him pulling out just before the game.
^INJ4 Anthony Edwards was unable to play due to a groin injury. No replacement due to him pulling out just before the game.

=== Draft ===
The NBA All-Star draft took place on February 6, 2025.

2025 All-Star Draft
Pick	Player	Team
1	LeBron James	Shaq
2	Anthony Edwards	Kenny
3	Nikola Jokić	Charles
4	Giannis Antetokounmpo	Charles
5	Stephen Curry	Shaq
6	Jalen Brunson	Kenny
7	Jaren Jackson Jr.	Kenny
8	Shai Gilgeous-Alexander	Charles
9	Anthony Davis	Shaq
10	Jayson Tatum	Shaq
11	Jalen Williams	Kenny
12	Victor Wembanyama	Charles
13	Pascal Siakam	Charles
14	Kevin Durant	Shaq
15	Darius Garland	Kenny
16	Evan Mobley	Kenny
17	Alperen Şengün	Charles
18	Damian Lillard	Shaq
19	James Harden	Shaq
20	Cade Cunningham	Kenny
21	Karl-Anthony Towns	Charles
22	Donovan Mitchell	Charles
23	Jaylen Brown	Shaq
24	Tyler Herro	Kenny

=== Lineups ===
Chuck's Global Stars
Pos	Player	Team
Starters
F	Pascal Siakam	Indiana Pacers
C	Nikola Jokić	Denver Nuggets
C	Karl-Anthony Towns	New York Knicks
G	Shai Gilgeous-Alexander	Oklahoma City Thunder
G	Donovan Mitchell	Cleveland Cavaliers
Reserves
C	Alperen Şengün	Houston Rockets
C	Victor Wembanyama	San Antonio Spurs
G	Trae Young^{REP1}	Atlanta Hawks
Injured
F	Giannis Antetokounmpo^{INJ1}	Milwaukee Bucks
Head coach: Mark Daigneault (Oklahoma City Thunder)

Shaq's OGs
Pos	Player	Team
Starters
F	Jayson Tatum	Boston Celtics
F	Kevin Durant	Phoenix Suns
G	Stephen Curry	Golden State Warriors
G	James Harden	Los Angeles Clippers
G	Damian Lillard	Milwaukee Bucks
Reserves
F	Jaylen Brown	Boston Celtics
G	Kyrie Irving^{REP2}	Dallas Mavericks
Injured
F	Anthony Davis^{INJ2}	Dallas Mavericks^{NOTE1}
F	LeBron James^{INJ3}	Los Angeles Lakers
Head coach: Kenny Atkinson (Cleveland Cavaliers)

Kenny's Young Stars
Pos	Player	Team
Starters
F	Jaren Jackson Jr.	Memphis Grizzlies
F	Evan Mobley	Cleveland Cavaliers
F	Jalen Williams	Oklahoma City Thunder
G	Jalen Brunson	New York Knicks
G	Tyler Herro	Miami Heat
Reserves
G	Darius Garland	Cleveland Cavaliers
G	Cade Cunningham	Detroit Pistons
Injured
G	Anthony Edwards^{INJ4}	Minnesota Timberwolves
Head coach: Dave Bliss (Oklahoma City Thunder)

Candace's Rising Stars
Pos	Player	Team
Starters
G	Stephon Castle	San Antonio Spurs
F	Zach Edey	Memphis Grizzlies
G	Keyonte George	Utah Jazz
G	Dalton Knecht	Los Angeles Lakers
G	Jaylen Wells	Memphis Grizzlies
Reserves
F	Ryan Dunn	Phoenix Suns
F	Trayce Jackson-Davis	Golden State Warriors
G	Amen Thompson	Houston Rockets
Head coach: Jordan Ott (Cleveland Cavaliers)

=== Bracket ===
Semi-finals
OGs	42
Rising Stars*	35
Young Stars	32
Global Stars	41

Final
OGs	41
Global Stars	25

*Team Chris, winners of the Rising Stars Challenge.

=== Semi-finals ===
February 16

Recap

Young Stars 32, Global Stars 41
Pts: Mobley, Garland and Herro 6 Rebs: Jackson Jr. 2 Asts: Brunson and Garland 3	Pts: Gilgeous-Alexander 12; Rebs: Wembanyama 4 Asts: Young 5

February 16

Recap

Rising Stars 35, OGs 42
Pts: Dunn and Knecht 8 Rebs: Thompson 3 Asts: Thompson 4	Pts: Lillard 9 Rebs: Curry 6 Asts: Durant 3

=== Championship game ===
February 16

Recap

OGs 41, Global Stars 25
Pts: Tatum 15; Rebs: Curry 4 Asts: Harden 4	Pts: Wembanyama 11; Rebs: Jokić and Towns 4 Asts: Jokić, Mitchell and Young 2

Shaq's OGs won the mini-tournament with a 41–25 win over Chuck's Global Stars. Curry scored 12 points for the OGs, including three on a half-court shot, and was named the All-Star MVP.

== All-Star Weekend ==
=== Celebrity Game ===
The 2025 NBA All-Star Celebrity Game was held on Friday, February 14, 2025, at the Oakland Arena in Oakland, California, with NFL legend Jerry Rice and MLB legend Barry Bonds serving as honorary coaches. The "Crunch Time" (each team receiving the ability to activate two minutes of double-points) and four-point line rules introduced returned.

ESPN

February 14, 2025
7:00 pm ET

Recap

Team Bonds 66, Team Rice 55
Scoring by quarter: 10–10, 21–15, 16–10, 19–20
Pts: Rome Flynn 22; Rebs: Flynn, Baron Davis, Tucker Halpern 8 Asts: Flynn, Davis 5	Pts: Terrell Owens 18; Rebs: Owens 6 Asts: Walker Hayes 4

Oakland Arena, Oakland, California

Team Bonds
Player	Background
Kai Cenat (2)	Online streamer, YouTuber, and influencer
Baron Davis (2)	Former NBA player
Rome Flynn	Actor
Rickea Jackson	WNBA player
Mickey Guyton	Singer, songwriter
Tucker Halpern	Musician
Noah Kahan	Singer/songwriter
Danny Ramirez	Actor
Masai Russell	Olympic sprinter
Pablo Schreiber	Actor
Dylan Wang (2)	Actor
Head coach: Barry Bonds (former MLB player)
Assistant coach: 2 Chainz (rapper and actor)

Team Rice
Player	Background
Matt Barnes	Former NBA player
Bayley	Professional wrestler
Chris Brickley	Basketball trainer
AP Dhillon	Singer, songwriter
Druski	Comedian, actor, and influencer
Walker Hayes (2)	Singer, songwriter
Shelby McEwen	Olympic High Jumper
Terrell Owens (4)	Former NFL player
Shaboozey	Singer, songwriter
Oliver Stark	Actor
Kayla Thornton	WNBA player
Head coach: Jerry Rice (Former NFL player)
Assistant coaches: Khaby Lame (YouTuber)

=== Rising Stars Challenge ===
Team Chris
Pos.	Player	Team	R/S/P
G	Stephon Castle	San Antonio Spurs	Rookies
F	Ryan Dunn	Phoenix Suns	Rookies
F	Zach Edey	Memphis Grizzlies	Rookies
G	Keyonte George	Utah Jazz	Sophomores
F	Trayce Jackson-Davis	Golden State Warriors	Sophomores
G	Dalton Knecht	Los Angeles Lakers	Rookies
G	Jaylen Wells	Memphis Grizzlies	Rookies
Honorary coach: Chris Mullin
Head coach:

Team Tim
Pos.	Player	Team	R/S/P
G	Anthony Black	Orlando Magic	Sophomores
F	Tristan da Silva	Orlando Magic	Rookies
G	Gradey Dick	Toronto Raptors	Sophomores
F	Jaime Jaquez Jr.	Miami Heat	Sophomores
F	Zaccharie Risacher	Atlanta Hawks	Rookies
F	Alex Sarr	Washington Wizards	Rookies
G	Brandin Podziemski	Golden State Warriors	Sophomores
Honorary coach: Tim Hardaway
Head coach:

Team Mitch
Pos.	Player	Team	R/S/P
F	Matas Buzelis	Chicago Bulls	Rookies
F	Toumani Camara	Portland Trail Blazers	Sophomores
G	Bub Carrington	Washington Wizards	Rookies
G	Bilal Coulibaly	Washington Wizards	Sophomores
G	Scoot Henderson	Portland Trail Blazers	Sophomores
G	Amen Thompson	Houston Rockets	Sophomores
F	Ausar Thompson	Detroit Pistons	Sophomores
Honorary coach: Mitch Richmond
Head coach:

Team G League
Pos.	Player	Team	R/S/P
G	JD Davison	Maine Celtics	G League
G	Mac McClung	Osceola Magic	G League
F	Bryce McGowens	Rip City Remix	G League
F	Leonard Miller	Iowa Wolves	G League
G	Dink Pate	Mexico City Capitanes	G League
G	Reed Sheppard	Rio Grande Valley Vipers	G League
G	Pat Spencer	Santa Cruz Warriors	G League
Honorary coach: Jeremy Lin
Head coach:

^INJ1 Jared McCain was unable to participate due to injury.
^REP1 Ryan Dunn was selected as Jared McCain's replacement.
^INJ2 Yves Missi was unable to participate due to injury.
^REP2 Matas Buzelis was selected as Yves Missi's replacement.
^INJ3 Dereck Lively II was unable to participate due to injury.
^REP3 Anthony Black was selected as Dereck Lively II's replacement.
^INJ4 Brandon Miller was unable to participate due to injury.
^REP4 Toumani Camara was selected as Brandon Miller's replacement.
^NOTE1 Victor Wembanyama was unable to participate due to NBA All-Star Game.
^REP5 Ausar Thompson was selected as Victor Wembanyama's replacement.

Semifinals
Team Chris	40
Team Tim	34
Team G League	40
Team Mitch	39

Final
Team Chris	25
Team G League	14

=== Skills Challenge ===
Team Cavs
Pos.	Player	Team
G	Donovan Mitchell	Cleveland Cavaliers
F	Evan Mobley	Cleveland Cavaliers

Team Rooks
Pos.	Player	Team
F	Zaccharie Risacher	Atlanta Hawks
C	Alex Sarr	Washington Wizards

Team Spurs
Pos.	Player	Team
G	Chris Paul	San Antonio Spurs
C	Victor Wembanyama	San Antonio Spurs

Team Warriors
Pos.	Player	Team
F	Draymond Green	Golden State Warriors
G	Moses Moody	Golden State Warriors

=== Three Point Contest ===
Indicates the champion

Rank	P	Player	Team	Height	Weight	First Round	Final Round
1	G	Tyler Herro	Miami Heat	6–5	195	19	24
2	G	Buddy Hield	Golden State Warriors	6–4	220	31	23
3	G	Darius Garland	Cleveland Cavaliers	6–1	192	24	19
4	G	Jalen Brunson	New York Knicks	6–2	190	18	DNQ
5	G	Damian Lillard	Milwaukee Bucks	6–2	195	18	DNQ
6	G	Cade Cunningham	Detroit Pistons	6–6	220	16	DNQ
7	F	Cameron Johnson	Brooklyn Nets	6–8	210	14	DNQ
8	G	Norman Powell	Los Angeles Clippers	6–4	215	14	DNQ

=== Slam Dunk Contest ===
Indicates the champion

#	P	Player	Team	H	W	First round			Finals		
#	P	Player	Team	H	W	1	2	T	1	2	T
1	G	Mac McClung	Orlando Magic	6–2	185	50.0	50.0	100.0	50.0	50.0	100.0
2	G	Stephon Castle	San Antonio Spurs	6–6	215	47.2	47.4	94.4	49.6	50.0	99.6
3	G	Andre Jackson Jr.	Milwaukee Bucks	6–6	209	43.8	45.0	88.8	DNQ		
4	F	Matas Buzelis	Chicago Bulls	6–10	209	40.0	47.4	87.4	DNQ		

== Entertainment ==
The Canadian national anthem was sung by pop singer Alessia Cara. The American national anthem was sung by Los Angeles firefighter Dennis R. Rodriguez. DJ Cassidy, E-40, Too Short, Saweetie, and En Vogue with former member Maxine Jones performed during the halftime show. R&B singer Raphael Saadiq performed during the player introductions.
