= 2024–25 Washington Wizards season =

Season of NBA team the Washington Wizards

- Head coach: Brian Keefe
- President: Michael Winger
- General manager: Will Dawkins
- Owner: Ted Leonsis
- Arena: Capital One Arena

Results
- Record: 18–64 (.220)
- Place: Division: 5th (Southeast); Conference: 15th (Eastern)
- Playoff finish: Did not qualify
- Stats at Basketball Reference

Local media
- Television: Monumental Sports Network
- Radio: Federal News Radio; 106.7 The Fan

The 2024–25 Washington Wizards season was the 64th season of the franchise in the National Basketball Association (NBA) and 51st in the Washington, D.C. area. Brian Keefe, who served as the interim head coach the previous season following the firing of Wes Unseld Jr., was hired as the fulltime coach during the offseason.

== Background ==
The previous season ended on the lowest-ever note for the Washington Wizards franchise, with a 15–67 record through the regular season, including an 0–4 record in the group stage of the new 2023 NBA In-Season Tournament, and a 16-game losing streak. The only team to perform worse during that season was the Detroit Pistons, who finished with a 14–68 record, including a record-high 28-game losing streak. Continuing their rebuild, the new front office prioritized finding and developing youth talent. The team decided to make Brian Keefe, who finished the season as the interim head coach after Wes Unseld Jr.'s removal, the full-time head coach for the season.

The Wizards also made multiple trades to land multiple picks in present and future drafts. After winning the #2 overall pick through the lottery, and a pair of draft-night trades, the team finished the 2024 NBA draft with three first-round picks, selecting Alex Sarr, Bub Carrington, and Kyshawn George. In addition, Deni Avdija was sent to the Portland Trail Blazers to land Malcolm Brogdon, while Jonas Valančiūnas was acquired in a sign-and-trade deal with the New Orleans Pelicans. The Wizards then signed multiple players to lower-end contracts. Of note were extensions to Corey Kispert ($54 million over four years) and Richaun Holmes ($25.9 million over two years), and the signing of former Atlanta Hawks forward Saddiq Bey ($19 million over three years).

=== October ===
The Wizards opened their season at home in Capital One Arena, with Sarr starting at center, Bilal Coulibaly and Kyle Kuzma in the front court, and Jordan Poole and Carrington bringing up the rear. Despite a strong performance from Poole that night, the team lost as no one else made any 3 Point Shots (except one from Patrick Baldwin Jr.) and did not get as many free throw attempts. Despite the sluggish start, the Wizards finished the month with back-to-back wins against the Atlanta Hawks, and ended October at 2–2.

=== November ===
The Wizards did not win a single game in this month, including a match against the Miami Heat in Mexico City to start November out and rematch against the Hawks on November 15 that ended with a 117–129 loss. They were the only NBA team to have not won a game in the mid-season tournament ever since the event was created the previous season. After back-to-back drubbings at the hands of the Pistons and Knicks in the following two games, Keefe publicly called out himself and his players for poor efforts. Though the team appeared to play with more effort after that, they still did not win a single game, ending the month on a 14-game losing streak and a 2–16 overall record after a loss to the Milwaukee Bucks on November 30.

=== December ===
The Wizards continued their losing streak from the previous month, matching their record from the last season of 16 losses and finishing winless in the NBA Cup mid-season tournament, before ending it with a win against the Denver Nuggets on December 7. Though the Wizards continued struggling throughout the month, they pulled off two wins against the Charlotte Hornets, and took the Knicks into their first overtime game of the season (though ended up losing 132–136). Justin Champagnie got a career-high and (for the night) team-high 31 points in that game. By the end of the month, the Wizards finished the month 3–9, and a 5–25 record overall.

=== January ===
Entering 2025, the Wizards started the year with a 125–107 win over the Chicago Bulls on January 1. However, following that victory to start the year on a positive note, the Wizards would follow it up with a second losing streak of 16 straight games from January 3 through the end of the month, recording only 1 win in January and sitting on a 6–41 overall record.

=== February ===
The Wizards snapped their second 16-game losing streak at the start of February, replacing it with a 3-game win streak, going undefeated on their roadtrip that took them through Minnesota, Charlotte, and Brooklyn, with the win against Minnesota their first road win of the season since the October 28th match in Atlanta. Around the time of the Nets game, the Wizards' Front Office made multiple trades to continue their rebuild: Despite having just acquired him earlier in the year, Valančiūnas was sent to the Kings. The following day, Kuzma and Baldwin Jr. were sent to the Bucks, while Marvin Bagley III and 2022 lottery pick Johnny Davis were shipped off to the Grizzlies. In return, the Wizards ended up with AJ Johnson, Khris Middleton, Colby Jones, Marcus Smart, and multiple future draft picks. While the team waited for the new players to arrive and become match-fit, the players still on the roster returned to Washington and proceeded to lose four straight games at home, including two where Poole scored over 40 points: 45 against the Cavaliers on February 7, and 42 against the Pacers in a close match on February 12 that the team eventually lost in OT.

At the 2025 NBA All-Star Game, three Wizards young players appeared in the Rising Stars Challenge, with Sarr on Team Tim, and Carrington and Coulibaly on Team Mitch, though neither team advanced to the finals in the challenge. Sarr also participated in the Skills Challenge alongside fellow Frenchman and #1 Overall Pick Zaccharie Risacher as "Team Rooks," though the duo didn't win the challenge.

Following the All-Star Break, the Wizards returned to action at Capital One Arena, where Middleton and Kuzma were set to face each other as members of the club opposite from where they started the year. Despite leading the entire first half and part of the third quarter, the Wizards defense collapsed while George and Poole's poor shooting performance spoiled the Wizards return, losing 104–101 against the Bucks. The Wizards would only notch one more win on their belt, a 107-99 performance against the Nets and the first time all season they held an opponent below 100 points. The Wizards would finish the month 4–7; with a 10–48 overall record, the team finally achieving a double-digit number of wins, avoiding all-time infamy below the previous Charlotte Bobcats or Philadelphia 76ers teams' performances that were initially projected from them at the time.

=== March ===
On March 3, the Wizards decided to sign Champagnie to a full contract, upgrading him from his initial two-way deal. After making room on the roster, the team then filled the empty two-way spot by claiming JT Thor off waivers from the Cavaliers. On the court, the Wizards managed to complete a seasonal sweep of both the Hornets and Nuggets during this month, winning every match they faced against those teams. In the final match against the Nuggets, a 126–123 win on March 15, Sarr achieved a career-high 34 points, and became the first rookie in Washington's history to have at least 30 points, 5 rebounds, and 5 assists in the same game.

Despite this being the most successful month the team had compared to others in the season, this month also saw Coulibaly and Kispert both shut down due to season-ending injuries. Also, the team was officially eliminated from playoff contention for the 4th year in a row, on March 21, after a 120–105 loss to the Magic. However, the team finished March with a 6–11 record in the month, a 16–59 overall record, surpassing their nadir from last season.

=== April ===
On April 3, despite the team losing to the Magic, Carrington set several highs similar to Sarr the previous month, with a performance that included 32 points, 9 rebounds, 7 assists. In addition, Carrington's seven made 3-pointers broke a franchise record for most 3-point shots made by a rookie in one game since Bradley Beal's rookie season, where he hit six, twice, in 2013. Carrington also made a game-winning shot to end the month in the team's final match of the season against Miami, a game in which 2023 second-round pick Tristan Vukčević was otherwise the star of the show, achieving his first double-double on a career-high 28 point, 11 rebound performance.

The Wizards ended April with a 2–5 record for the month, finishing with an overall 18–64 record. Though a slight improvement from the team's 15-win season last year, it was still the worst in the Eastern Conference and the second-worst in the NBA, as the Utah Jazz "won" the race to the bottom with an overall 17–65 record.

== Draft picks ==
| Round | Pick | Player | Position | Nationality | College |
|---|---|---|---|---|---|
| 1 | 2 | Alex Sarr | PF | France | Perth Wildcats (Australia) |
| 1 | 26 | Dillon Jones | SF | United States | Weber State |
| 2 | 51 | Melvin Ajinça | SF | France | Saint-Quentin (France) |

The Wizards entered the draft holding two first-round picks and one second-round pick. The Wizards would not swap their top pick with either the Memphis Grizzlies or the Phoenix Suns this year following their Bradley Beal trade from the previous season since their pick would land within the top 13 protection. The two other picks were acquired through previous trades: the late first-round selection—originally owned by the Los Angeles Clippers and acquired from the Dallas Mavericks—was conveyed as the second-least favorable pick among the Clippers, Oklahoma City, Utah Jazz, and Houston Rockets when the Clippers finished with the second-best record of the four the previous season, while the second-round pick was acquired from Phoenix via the Bradley Beal trade. The team had also traded their original second-round pick to the Brooklyn Nets, and it was eventually used by Utah as the most favorable pick than that of Memphis after the Wizards finished with a worse record the previous season.

With the #2 Overall selection, the Wizards drafted the French prospect Alex Sarr from the Perth Wildcats in Australia. Shortly before the start of the draft, the Wizards traded Deni Avdija to the Portland Trail Blazers and got their #14 pick as part of the return, which they used on Bub Carrington from Pittsburgh. During the first draft night, the Wizards then struck a trade with the New York Knicks to move up two spots, giving their last two picks of this year's draft (#26 and #51) to acquire the rights to the Knicks' #24 pick, which became Kyshawn George.

== Roster ==
2024–25 Washington Wizards roster
Players

| Pos. | No. | Player | Height | Weight | DOB | From |
|---|---|---|---|---|---|---|
| F | 14 | Saddiq Bey | 6 ft 8 in (2.03 m) | 215 lb (98 kg) | 1999-04-09 | Villanova |
| G | 15 | Malcolm Brogdon | 6 ft 4 in (1.93 m) | 229 lb (104 kg) | 1992-12-11 | Virginia |
| G | 8 | Bub Carrington | 6 ft 4 in (1.93 m) | 190 lb (86 kg) | 2005-07-21 | Pittsburgh |
| G/F | 9 | Justin Champagnie | 6 ft 6 in (1.98 m) | 206 lb (93 kg) | 2001-06-29 | Pittsburgh |
| G/F | 0 | Bilal Coulibaly | 6 ft 8 in (2.03 m) | 195 lb (88 kg) | 2004-07-26 | France |
| F | 18 | Kyshawn George | 6 ft 8 in (2.03 m) | 200 lb (91 kg) | 2003-12-12 | Miami (FL) |
| F | 16 | Anthony Gill | 6 ft 8 in (2.03 m) | 230 lb (104 kg) | 1992-10-17 | Virginia |
| C | 22 | Richaun Holmes | 6 ft 9 in (2.06 m) | 235 lb (107 kg) | 1993-10-15 | Bowling Green |
| G | 5 | AJ Johnson | 6 ft 5 in (1.96 m) | 160 lb (73 kg) | 2004-12-01 | SoCal Academy (CA) |
| G | 1 | Colby Jones | 6 ft 6 in (1.98 m) | 207 lb (94 kg) | 2002-05-28 | Xavier |
| F | 24 | Corey Kispert | 6 ft 6 in (1.98 m) | 224 lb (102 kg) | 1999-03-03 | Gonzaga |
| F | 4 | Jaylen Martin (TW) | 6 ft 6 in (1.98 m) | 216 lb (98 kg) | 2004-01-28 | FSUS (FL) |
| F | 32 | Khris Middleton | 6 ft 7 in (2.01 m) | 222 lb (101 kg) | 1991-08-12 | Texas A&M |
| G | 13 | Jordan Poole | 6 ft 4 in (1.93 m) | 194 lb (88 kg) | 1999-06-19 | Michigan |
| F/C | 20 | Alex Sarr | 7 ft 0 in (2.13 m) | 205 lb (93 kg) | 2005-04-26 | France |
| G | 36 | Marcus Smart | 6 ft 3 in (1.91 m) | 220 lb (100 kg) | 1994-03-06 | Oklahoma State |
| F | 21 | JT Thor (TW) | 6 ft 9 in (2.06 m) | 203 lb (92 kg) | 2002-08-26 | Auburn |
| C | 00 | Tristan Vukčević (TW) | 7 ft 0 in (2.13 m) | 220 lb (100 kg) | 2003-03-11 | Serbia |

Coaches
Head coach
- Brian Keefe
Assistant(s)
- Alexis Ajinça
- Adam Caporn
- JJ Outlaw
- Brian Randle
- T. J. Sorrentine
- David Vanterpool

Legend
- (DP) Unsigned draft pick
- (FA) Free agent
- (S) Suspended
- (GL) G League assignment
- (TW) Two-way affiliate player
- Injured

Roster
Updated: April 14, 2025

== Standings ==
=== Division ===
| Southeast Division | W | L | PCT | GB | Home | Road | Div | GP |
|---|---|---|---|---|---|---|---|---|
| y – Orlando Magic | 41 | 41 | .500 | – | 22‍–‍19 | 19‍–‍22 | 12‍–‍4 | 82 |
| pi – Atlanta Hawks | 40 | 42 | .488 | 1.0 | 21‍–‍19 | 19‍–‍23 | 10‍–‍6 | 82 |
| x – Miami Heat | 37 | 45 | .451 | 4.0 | 19‍–‍22 | 18‍–‍23 | 10‍–‍6 | 82 |
| Charlotte Hornets | 19 | 63 | .232 | 22.0 | 12‍–‍29 | 7‍–‍34 | 1‍–‍15 | 82 |
| Washington Wizards | 18 | 64 | .220 | 23.0 | 8‍–‍33 | 10‍–‍31 | 7‍–‍9 | 82 |

=== Conference ===
Eastern Conference
| # | Team | W | L | PCT | GB | GP |
|---|---|---|---|---|---|---|
| 1 | c – Cleveland Cavaliers * | 64 | 18 | .780 | – | 82 |
| 2 | y – Boston Celtics * | 61 | 21 | .744 | 3.0 | 82 |
| 3 | x – New York Knicks | 51 | 31 | .622 | 13.0 | 82 |
| 4 | x – Indiana Pacers | 50 | 32 | .610 | 14.0 | 82 |
| 5 | x – Milwaukee Bucks | 48 | 34 | .585 | 16.0 | 82 |
| 6 | x – Detroit Pistons | 44 | 38 | .537 | 20.0 | 82 |
| 7 | y – Orlando Magic * | 41 | 41 | .500 | 23.0 | 82 |
| 8 | pi – Atlanta Hawks | 40 | 42 | .488 | 24.0 | 82 |
| 9 | pi – Chicago Bulls | 39 | 43 | .476 | 25.0 | 82 |
| 10 | x – Miami Heat | 37 | 45 | .451 | 27.0 | 82 |
| 11 | Toronto Raptors | 30 | 52 | .366 | 34.0 | 82 |
| 12 | Brooklyn Nets | 26 | 56 | .317 | 38.0 | 82 |
| 13 | Philadelphia 76ers | 24 | 58 | .293 | 40.0 | 82 |
| 14 | Charlotte Hornets | 19 | 63 | .232 | 45.0 | 82 |
| 15 | Washington Wizards | 18 | 64 | .220 | 46.0 | 82 |

== Game log ==
=== Preseason ===
2024 preseason game log
Total: 2–3 (Home: 2–0; Road: 0–3)
Preseason: 2–3 (home: 2–0; road: 0–3)

| Game | Date | Team | Score | High points | High rebounds | High assists | Location Attendance | Record |
|---|---|---|---|---|---|---|---|---|
| 1 | October 6 | @ Toronto | L 98–125 | Jordan Poole (16) | Jonas Valančiūnas (6) | Jordan Poole (6) | (Canada) Bell Centre; 21,900 | 0–1 |
| 2 | October 9 | @ New York | L 94–117 | George, Kispert (14) | Coulibaly, Sarr (9) | Ja. Butler, Poole (4) | Madison Square Garden; 19,161 | 0–2 |
| 3 | October 11 | Toronto | W 113–95 | Kyle Kuzma (22) | Jonas Valančiūnas (8) | Kyshawn George (5) | Capital One Arena; 7,815 | 1–2 |
| 4 | October 14 | @ Brooklyn | L 92–131 | Jordan Poole (13) | Marvin Bagley III (8) | Jared Butler (8) | Barclays Center; 12,904 | 1–3 |
| 5 | October 18 | New York | W 118–117 | Jordan Poole (16) | Marvin Bagley III (7) | Ja. Butler, Davis, George, Poole (5) | Capital One Arena; 11,894 | 2–3 |

2024–25 preseason schedule

=== Regular season ===
2024–25 game log
Total: 18–64 (Home: 8–33; Road: 10–31)
October: 2–2 (home: 1–2; road: 1–0)

| Game | Date | Team | Score | High points | High rebounds | High assists | Location Attendance | Record |
|---|---|---|---|---|---|---|---|---|
| 1 | October 24 | Boston | L 102–122 | Jordan Poole (26) | Bagley III, Coulibaly (6) | Bilal Coulibaly (6) | Capital One Arena; 18,610 | 0–1 |
| 2 | October 26 | Cleveland | L 116–135 | Bilal Coulibaly (23) | Kuzma, Valančiūnas (8) | Jordan Poole (6) | Capital One Arena; 15,156 | 0–2 |
| 3 | October 28 | @ Atlanta | W 121–119 | Jordan Poole (26) | Kyle Kuzma (11) | Kyle Kuzma (7) | State Farm Arena; 14,566 | 1–2 |
| 4 | October 30 | Atlanta | W 133–120 | Bilal Coulibaly (27) | Bilal Coulibaly (9) | Jordan Poole (9) | Capital One Arena; 14,255 | 2–2 |

November: 0–14 (home: 0–6; road: 0–8)

| Game | Date | Team | Score | High points | High rebounds | High assists | Location Attendance | Record |
|---|---|---|---|---|---|---|---|---|
| 5 | November 2 | Miami | L 98–118 | Bilal Coulibaly (22) | Coulibaly, George (8) | Bub Carrington (8) | Mexico City Arena; 20,328 | 2–3 |
| 6 | November 4 | Golden State | L 112–125 | Jordan Poole (24) | Jonas Valančiūnas (12) | Carrington, Valančiūnas (7) | Capital One Arena; 15,674 | 2–4 |
| 7 | November 8 | @ Memphis | L 104–128 | Kyshawn George (17) | Bub Carrington (10) | Bub Carrington (8) | FedExForum; 16,216 | 2–5 |
| 8 | November 10 | @ Orlando | L 94–121 | Jordan Poole (24) | Kyshawn George (7) | Bilal Coulibaly (6) | Kia Center; 18,352 | 2–6 |
| 9 | November 11 | @ Houston | L 92–107 | Kyle Kuzma (18) | Jonas Valančiūnas (8) | Carrington, Poole (6) | Toyota Center; 15,998 | 2–7 |
| 10 | November 13 | @ San Antonio | L 130–139 | Jordan Poole (42) | Jonas Valančiūnas (15) | Jordan Poole (6) | Frost Bank Center; 16,602 | 2–8 |
| 11 | November 15 | @ Atlanta | L 117–129 | Kyle Kuzma (24) | Coulibaly, Kuzma (9) | Bub Carrington (9) | State Farm Arena; 16,038 | 2–9 |
| 12 | November 17 | Detroit | L 104–124 | Kuzma, Poole (22) | Jonas Valančiūnas (10) | Kyshawn George (6) | Capital One Arena; 14,789 | 2–10 |
| 13 | November 18 | @ New York | L 106–134 | Carrington, Kispert, Valančiūnas (18) | Kuzma, Valančiūnas (8) | Jordan Poole (5) | Madison Square Garden; 19,812 | 2–11 |
| 14 | November 22 | Boston | L 96–108 | Jordan Poole (23) | Brogdon, Valančiūnas (10) | Jordan Poole (8) | Capital One Arena; 20,385 | 2–12 |
| 15 | November 24 | @ Indiana | L 103–115 | Coulibaly, Sarr (17) | Alex Sarr (14) | Brogdon, George (5) | Gainbridge Fieldhouse; 17,274 | 2–13 |
| 16 | November 26 | Chicago | L 108–127 | Kyle Kuzma (23) | Kuzma, Sarr (7) | Bilal Coulibaly (5) | Capital One Arena; 15,921 | 2–14 |
| 17 | November 27 | L.A. Clippers | L 96–121 | Brogdon, Valančiūnas (17) | Jonas Valančiūnas (7) | Malcolm Brogdon (6) | Capital One Arena; 15,066 | 2–15 |
| 18 | November 30 | @ Milwaukee | L 114–124 | Jordan Poole (31) | Malcolm Brogdon (11) | Jordan Poole (7) | Fiserv Forum; 17,341 | 2–16 |

December: 3–9 (home: 3–5; road: 0–4)

| Game | Date | Team | Score | High points | High rebounds | High assists | Location Attendance | Record |
|---|---|---|---|---|---|---|---|---|
| 19 | December 3 | @ Cleveland | L 87–118 | Carrington, Poole, Valančiūnas (13) | Jonas Valančiūnas (11) | Coulibaly, Poole (4) | Rocket Mortgage FieldHouse; 19,432 | 2–17 |
| 20 | December 5 | Dallas | L 101–137 | Bagley III, Brogdon (16) | Bagley III, Sarr (8) | Jordan Poole (8) | Capital One Arena; 15,921 | 2–18 |
| 21 | December 7 | Denver | W 122–113 | Jordan Poole (39) | Jonas Valančiūnas (12) | Jordan Poole (8) | Capital One Arena; 16,182 | 3–18 |
| 22 | December 8 | Memphis | L 112–140 | Bagley III, Valančiūnas (20) | Jonas Valančiūnas (14) | Jared Butler (7) | Capital One Arena; 15,012 | 3–19 |
| 23 | December 13 | @ Cleveland | L 105–115 | Bilal Coulibaly (27) | Justin Champagnie (8) | Jordan Poole (6) | Rocket Mortgage FieldHouse; 19,432 | 3–20 |
| 24 | December 15 | Boston | L 98–112 | Jordan Poole (21) | Justin Champagnie (14) | Jordan Poole (7) | Capital One Arena; 16,227 | 3–21 |
| 25 | December 19 | Charlotte | W 123–114 | Jordan Poole (27) | Carrington, Sarr (9) | Malcolm Brogdon (6) | Capital One Arena; 15,256 | 4–21 |
| 26 | December 21 | @ Milwaukee | L 101–112 | Jordan Poole (26) | Bilal Coulibaly (12) | Bilal Coulibaly (5) | Fiserv Forum; 17,341 | 4–22 |
| 27 | December 23 | @ Oklahoma City | L 105–123 | Jordan Poole (31) | Jonas Valančiūnas (16) | Jordan Poole (7) | Paycom Center; 18,203 | 4–23 |
| 28 | December 26 | Charlotte | W 113–110 | Jordan Poole (25) | Jonas Valančiūnas (12) | Malcolm Brogdon (6) | Capital One Arena; 17,193 | 5–23 |
| 29 | December 28 | New York | L 132–136 (OT) | Justin Champagnie (31) | Justin Champagnie (10) | Malcolm Brogdon (7) | Capital One Arena; 20,385 | 5–24 |
| 30 | December 30 | New York | L 106–126 | Jonas Valančiūnas (22) | Jonas Valančiūnas (9) | Malcolm Brogdon (7) | Capital One Arena; 20,385 | 5–25 |

January: 1–16 (home: 1–7; road: 0–9)

| Game | Date | Team | Score | High points | High rebounds | High assists | Location Attendance | Record |
|---|---|---|---|---|---|---|---|---|
| 31 | January 1 | Chicago | W 125–107 | Jordan Poole (30) | Alex Sarr (10) | Brogdon, Carrington, Valančiūnas (6) | Capital One Arena; 16,298 | 6–25 |
| 32 | January 3 | @ New Orleans | L 120–132 | Jordan Poole (26) | Jonas Valančiūnas (10) | Jordan Poole (7) | Smoothie King Center; 17,307 | 6–26 |
| 33 | January 5 | New Orleans | L 98–110 | Kyle Kuzma (28) | Alex Sarr (11) | Brogdon, Butler (5) | Capital One Arena; 15,451 | 6–27 |
| 34 | January 7 | Houston | L 112–135 | Corey Kispert (23) | Alex Sarr (9) | Butler, Carrington (5) | Capital One Arena; 12,930 | 6–28 |
| 35 | January 8 | @ Philadelphia | L 103–109 | Jared Butler (26) | Jonas Valančiūnas (14) | Jared Butler (7) | Wells Fargo Center; 19,762 | 6–29 |
| 36 | January 10 | @ Chicago | L 105–138 | Jordan Poole (22) | Alex Sarr (11) | Bilal Coulibaly (5) | United Center; 21,391 | 6–30 |
| 37 | January 12 | Oklahoma City | L 95–136 | Corey Kispert (17) | Jonas Valančiūnas (8) | Bub Carrington (7) | Capital One Arena; 15,711 | 6–31 |
| 38 | January 13 | Minnesota | L 109–120 | Kyle Kuzma (22) | Jonas Valančiūnas (8) | Kuzma, Sarr (5) | Capital One Arena; 14,386 | 6–32 |
| 39 | January 16 | Phoenix | L 123–130 | Kyshawn George (24) | Alex Sarr (9) | Kispert, Kuzma (5) | Capital One Arena; 15,792 | 6–33 |
| 40 | January 18 | @ Golden State | L 114–122 | Jordan Poole (38) | Sarr, Valančiūnas (9) | Bilal Coulibaly (7) | Chase Center; 18,064 | 6–34 |
| 41 | January 19 | @ Sacramento | L 100–123 | Jonas Valančiūnas (23) | Jonas Valančiūnas (12) | Carrington, George, Kuzma, Poole, Valančiūnas (3) | Golden 1 Center; 17,832 | 6–35 |
| 42 | January 21 | @ L.A. Lakers | L 88–111 | Bilal Coulibaly (17) | Kyle Kuzma (9) | George, Kuzma (5) | Crypto.com Arena; 18,672 | 6–36 |
| 43 | January 23 | @ L.A. Clippers | L 93–110 | Jordan Poole (24) | Sarr, Valančiūnas (10) | Jordan Poole (9) | Intuit Dome; 13,771 | 6–37 |
| 44 | January 25 | @ Phoenix | L 109–119 | Kyle Kuzma (30) | Kyle Kuzma (11) | Jordan Poole (10) | Footprint Center; 17,071 | 6–38 |
| 45 | January 27 | @ Dallas | L 108–130 | Bilal Coulibaly (16) | Champagnie, Kuzma, Poole (6) | Jordan Poole (6) | American Airlines Center; 20,031 | 6–39 |
| 46 | January 29 | Toronto | L 82–106 | Kyle Kuzma (19) | Jonas Valančiūnas (11) | George, Holmes (3) | Capital One Arena; 13,713 | 6–40 |
| 47 | January 30 | L.A. Lakers | L 96–134 | Jordan Poole (19) | Holmes, Poole (5) | Bub Carrington (6) | Capital One Arena; 17,491 | 6–41 |

February: 4–7 (home: 1–6; road: 3–1)

| Game | Date | Team | Score | High points | High rebounds | High assists | Location Attendance | Record |
|---|---|---|---|---|---|---|---|---|
| 48 | February 1 | @ Minnesota | W 105–103 | Kyle Kuzma (31) | Jonas Valančiūnas (10) | Bilal Coulibaly (5) | Target Center; 18,978 | 7–41 |
| 49 | February 3 | @ Charlotte | W 124–114 | Bilal Coulibaly (26) | Jonas Valančiūnas (17) | Malcolm Brogdon (7) | Spectrum Center; 14,129 | 8–41 |
| 50 | February 5 | @ Brooklyn | W 119–102 | Jordan Poole (19) | Bilal Coulibaly (10) | Bilal Coulibaly (11) | Barclays Center; 16,035 | 9–41 |
| 51 | February 7 | Cleveland | L 124–134 | Jordan Poole (45) | Richaun Holmes (12) | Jordan Poole (5) | Capital One Arena; 20,385 | 9–42 |
| 52 | February 8 | Atlanta | L 111–125 | Bub Carrington (23) | Champagnie, Holmes, Vukčević (8) | Bub Carrington (7) | Capital One Arena; 16,835 | 9–43 |
| 53 | February 10 | San Antonio | L 121–131 | Tristan Vukčević (18) | Kyshawn George (7) | Brogdon, Carrington (5) | Capital One Arena; 17,446 | 9–44 |
| 54 | February 12 | Indiana | L 130–134 (OT) | Jordan Poole (42) | Kyshawn George (9) | Bilal Coulibaly (8) | Capital One Arena; 11,457 | 9–45 |
All-Star Game
| 55 | February 21 | Milwaukee | L 101–104 | Alex Sarr (22) | Kyshawn George (9) | George, Poole (5) | Capital One Arena; 18,865 | 9–46 |
| 56 | February 23 | @ Orlando | L 90–110 | Jordan Poole (16) | Richaun Holmes (10) | Bilal Coulibaly (6) | Kia Center; 18,712 | 9–47 |
| 57 | February 24 | Brooklyn | W 107–99 | Jordan Poole (26) | Justin Champagnie (7) | George, Middleton (5) | Capital One Arena; 13,785 | 10–47 |
| 58 | February 26 | Portland | L 121–129 | Jordan Poole (24) | Bub Carrington (8) | Khris Middleton (5) | Capital One Arena; 12,943 | 10–48 |

March: 6–11 (home: 1–5; road: 5–6)

| Game | Date | Team | Score | High points | High rebounds | High assists | Location Attendance | Record |
|---|---|---|---|---|---|---|---|---|
| 59 | March 1 | @ Charlotte | W 113–100 | Coulibaly, Middleton (17) | Richaun Holmes (9) | Kyshawn George (8) | Spectrum Center; 17,904 | 11–48 |
| 60 | March 3 | @ Miami | L 90–106 | Khris Middleton (16) | Champagnie, George, Holmes (8) | Bub Carrington (7) | Kaseya Center; 19,600 | 11–49 |
| 61 | March 5 | Utah | W 125–122 | Kyshawn George (23) | George, Vukčević (7) | Bub Carrington (9) | Capital One Arena; 14,761 | 12–49 |
| 62 | March 8 | @ Toronto | W 118–117 | Jordan Poole (34) | Alex Sarr (14) | Jordan Poole (5) | Scotiabank Arena; 19,042 | 13–49 |
| 63 | March 10 | @ Toronto | L 104–119 | Poole, Sarr (16) | Alex Sarr (11) | AJ Johnson (6) | Scotiabank Arena; 18,739 | 13–50 |
| 64 | March 11 | @ Detroit | L 103–123 | Marcus Smart (16) | Champagnie, Holmes (8) | Carrington, Kispert, Poole (3) | Little Caesars Arena; 17,699 | 13–51 |
| 65 | March 13 | @ Detroit | W 129–125 | Alex Sarr (19) | Justin Champagnie (9) | Khris Middleton (8) | Little Caesars Arena; 20,062 | 14–51 |
| 66 | March 15 | @ Denver | W 126–123 | Alex Sarr (34) | Justin Champagnie (13) | Bub Carrington (7) | Ball Arena; 19,833 | 15–51 |
| 67 | March 17 | @ Portland | L 97–112 | Alex Sarr (20) | Tristan Vukčević (8) | Bub Carrington (8) | Moda Center; 17,919 | 15–52 |
| 68 | March 19 | @ Utah | L 112–128 | Colby Jones (24) | Alex Sarr (9) | AJ Johnson (6) | Delta Center; 18,175 | 15–53 |
| 69 | March 21 | Orlando | L 105–120 | Alex Sarr (19) | Alex Sarr (10) | Kyshawn George (8) | Capital One Arena; 18,317 | 15–54 |
| 70 | March 22 | @ New York | L 103–122 | Jordan Poole (25) | Kyshawn George (10) | Kyshawn George (4) | Madison Square Garden; 19,812 | 15–55 |
| 71 | March 24 | Toronto | L 104–112 | Jordan Poole (23) | Bub Carrington (11) | Bub Carrington (6) | Capital One Arena; 13,532 | 15–56 |
| 72 | March 26 | @ Philadelphia | W 119–114 | Alex Sarr (24) | Justin Champagnie (10) | Jordan Poole (7) | Wells Fargo Center; 19,770 | 16–56 |
| 73 | March 27 | Indiana | L 109–162 | Alex Sarr (22) | Champagnie, Sarr (7) | Bub Carrington (6) | Capital One Arena; 15,393 | 16–57 |
| 74 | March 29 | Brooklyn | L 112–115 | Johnson, Jones (20) | Justin Champagnie (9) | Johnson, Jones, Poole (4) | Capital One Arena; 16,316 | 16–58 |
| 75 | March 31 | Miami | L 94–120 | Jordan Poole (35) | Carrington, Holmes (8) | Bub Carrington (9) | Capital One Arena; 16,901 | 16–59 |

April: 2–5 (home: 1–2; road: 1–3)

| Game | Date | Team | Score | High points | High rebounds | High assists | Location Attendance | Record |
|---|---|---|---|---|---|---|---|---|
| 76 | April 2 | Sacramento | W 116–111 | Jordan Poole (23) | Justin Champagnie (11) | Bub Carrington (7) | Capital One Arena; 15,018 | 17–59 |
| 77 | April 3 | Orlando | L 97–109 | Bub Carrington (32) | Bub Carrington (9) | Bub Carrington (7) | Capital One Arena; 15,998 | 17–60 |
| 78 | April 6 | @ Boston | L 90–124 | Alex Sarr (16) | Justin Champagnie (13) | Bub Carrington (6) | TD Garden; 19,156 | 17–61 |
| 79 | April 8 | @ Indiana | L 98–104 | Champagnie, Sarr (20) | Justin Champagnie (13) | Alex Sarr (6) | Gainbridge Fieldhouse; 16,144 | 17–62 |
| 80 | April 9 | Philadelphia | L 103–122 | Tristan Vukčević (24) | Justin Champagnie (12) | Bub Carrington (6) | Capital One Arena; 17,222 | 17–63 |
| 81 | April 11 | @ Chicago | L 89–119 | Justin Champagnie (22) | Justin Champagnie (14) | Bub Carrington (11) | United Center; 21,400 | 17–64 |
| 82 | April 13 | @ Miami | W 119–118 | Tristan Vukčević (28) | Tristan Vukčević (11) | Bub Carrington (9) | Kaseya Center; 19,968 | 18–64 |

2024–25 season schedule

=== NBA Cup ===
The groups were revealed during the tournament announcement on July 12, 2024.

==== East Group C ====
| Pos | Team | Pld | W | L | PF | PA | PD | Qualification |
|---|---|---|---|---|---|---|---|---|
| 1 | Atlanta Hawks | 4 | 3 | 1 | 485 | 470 | +15 | Advance to knockout stage |
| 2 | Boston Celtics | 4 | 3 | 1 | 482 | 459 | +23 | |
| 3 | Cleveland Cavaliers | 4 | 2 | 2 | 480 | 450 | +30 | |
| 4 | Chicago Bulls | 4 | 2 | 2 | 518 | 512 | +6 | |
| 5 | Washington Wizards | 4 | 0 | 4 | 408 | 482 | −74 | |

Source: NBA
Rules for classification: Tiebreakers

== Player statistics ==
Legend
| GP | Games played | GS | Games started | MPG | Minutes per game |
| FG% | Field-goal percentage | 3P% | 3-point field-goal percentage | FT% | Free-throw percentage |
| RPG | Rebounds per game | APG | Assists per game | SPG | Steals per game |
| BPG | Blocks per game | PPG | Points per game |

=== Regular season ===
Washington Wizards statistics
| Player | GP | GS | MPG | FG% | 3P% | FT% | RPG | APG | SPG | BPG | PPG |
|---|---|---|---|---|---|---|---|---|---|---|---|
| Marvin Bagley III^{†} | 19 | 1 | 8.7 | .535 | .200 | .652 | 2.9 | .4 | .4 | .3 | 4.9 |
| Patrick Baldwin Jr.^{†} | 22 | 0 | 4.6 | .515 | .524 | .500 | 1.0 | .1 | .1 | .1 | 2.1 |
| Malcolm Brogdon | 24 | 13 | 23.5 | .433 | .286 | .880 | 3.8 | 4.1 | .5 | .2 | 12.7 |
| Jared Butler^{†} | 32 | 0 | 11.3 | .483 | .366 | .778 | 1.3 | 2.6 | .4 | .2 | 6.9 |
| Bub Carrington | 82 | 57 | 30.0 | .401 | .339 | .812 | 4.2 | 4.4 | .7 | .3 | 9.8 |
| Justin Champagnie | 62 | 31 | 21.6 | .511 | .383 | .685 | 5.7 | 1.0 | 1.0 | .6 | 8.8 |
| Bilal Coulibaly | 59 | 59 | 33.0 | .421 | .281 | .746 | 5.0 | 3.4 | 1.3 | .7 | 12.3 |
| Johnny Davis | 34 | 0 | 7.1 | .410 | .241 | .600 | 1.1 | .3 | .4 | .2 | 2.4 |
| Kyshawn George | 68 | 38 | 26.5 | .372 | .322 | .753 | 4.2 | 2.5 | 1.0 | .7 | 8.7 |
| Anthony Gill | 51 | 0 | 7.8 | .489 | .323 | .660 | 1.3 | .3 | .2 | .0 | 2.5 |
| Richaun Holmes | 31 | 7 | 17.2 | .647 | .000 | .833 | 5.7 | 1.4 | .3 | .7 | 7.4 |
| AJ Johnson^{†} | 22 | 11 | 27.0 | .381 | .247 | .886 | 2.4 | 3.1 | .5 | .1 | 9.1 |
| Colby Jones^{†} | 15 | 0 | 25.7 | .466 | .308 | .657 | 4.3 | 2.5 | 1.3 | .4 | 8.7 |
| Corey Kispert | 61 | 0 | 26.3 | .451 | .364 | .852 | 3.0 | 1.7 | .4 | .2 | 11.6 |
| Kyle Kuzma^{†} | 32 | 30 | 27.7 | .420 | .281 | .602 | 5.8 | 2.5 | .6 | .2 | 15.2 |
| Jaylen Martin^{†} | 13 | 2 | 18.0 | .417 | .273 | .900 | 3.4 | 1.3 | .7 | .0 | 5.8 |
| Jalen McDaniels | 4 | 0 | 1.8 | | | | .0 | .3 | .3 | .0 | .0 |
| Khris Middleton^{†} | 14 | 14 | 22.1 | .413 | .277 | .868 | 3.7 | 3.4 | 1.3 | .2 | 10.7 |
| Jordan Poole | 68 | 68 | 29.4 | .432 | .378 | .883 | 3.0 | 4.5 | 1.3 | .4 | 20.5 |
| Alex Sarr | 67 | 67 | 27.1 | .394 | .308 | .679 | 6.5 | 2.4 | .7 | 1.5 | 13.0 |
| Marcus Smart^{†} | 15 | 1 | 18.7 | .440 | .392 | .686 | 1.9 | 2.5 | 1.1 | .2 | 9.3 |
| JT Thor^{†} | 11 | 0 | 18.8 | .364 | .200 | .571 | 3.8 | .5 | .5 | .5 | 3.9 |
| Jonas Valančiūnas^{†} | 49 | 12 | 20.1 | .547 | .259 | .896 | 8.2 | 2.2 | .4 | .6 | 11.5 |
| Tristan Vukčević | 35 | 1 | 14.7 | .496 | .373 | .776 | 3.7 | 1.1 | .3 | .7 | 9.4 |

- ^{†} Denotes player spent time with another team in the season. Stats reflect time with the Wizards only.

== Transactions ==
=== Trades ===
| June 26, 2024 | To Washington Wizards Draft rights to Kyshawn George (No. 24) | To New York Knicks Draft rights to Dillon Jones (No. 26); Draft rights to Melvin Ajinça (No. 51) |
| July 6, 2024 | To Washington Wizards Malcolm Brogdon; Draft rights to Bub Carrington (No. 14); 2029 first-round pick Two future second-round draft picks | To Portland Trail Blazers Deni Avdija |
| July 6, 2024 | To Washington Wizards Jonas Valančiūnas (sign-and-trade) | To New Orleans Pelicans 2027 CHI protected second-round pick |
| February 5, 2025 | To Washington Wizards Sidy Cissoko; 2028 DEN protected second-round pick 2029 SAC second-round pick | To Sacramento Kings Jonas Valančiūnas |
| February 6, 2025 | To Washington Wizards AJ Johnson; Khris Middleton; 2028 right to swap first-round picks | To Milwaukee Bucks Patrick Baldwin Jr. Kyle Kuzma; 2025 second-round pick |
| February 6, 2025 | Three-team trade |
| February 6, 2025 | To Washington Wizards Colby Jones (from Sacramento); Alex Len (from Sacramento); Marcus Smart (from Memphis); 2025 MEM protected first-round pick (from Memphis) | To Memphis Grizzlies Marvin Bagley III (from Washington); Johnny Davis (from Washington); 2025 WAS second-round pick (from Washington); 2028 SAC second-round pick (from Sacramento) |
| February 6, 2025 | To Sacramento Kings Jake LaRavia (from Memphis) |

=== Free agency ===
==== Re-signed ====
| Date re-signed | Player | Contract | Ref. |
|---|---|---|---|
| June 29 | Richaun Holmes | $25.9M / 2 years | |
| July 3 | Tristan Vukčević | Two-way contract | |
| July 25 | Anthony Gill | $4.7M / 2 years | |
| October 21 | Corey Kispert | $54M / 4 years, with 2028–29 club option | |
| October 21 | Jared Butler | Two-way contract | |

==== Additions ====
| Date signed | Player | Contract | Former team | Ref. |
|---|---|---|---|---|
| July 11 | Saddiq Bey | $19M / 3 years | Atlanta Hawks | |
