= Malcolm Brogdon =

American basketball player (born 1992)

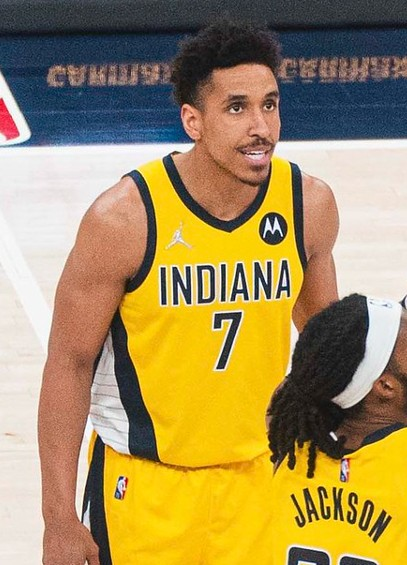
- Brogdon with the Indiana Pacers in 2022

Personal information
- Born: December 11, 1992 (age 33) Atlanta, Georgia, U.S.
- Listed height: 6 ft 4 in (1.93 m)
- Listed weight: 229 lb (104 kg)

Career information
- High school: Greater Atlanta Christian (Norcross, Georgia)
- College: Virginia (2011–2016)
- NBA draft: 2016: 2nd round, 36th overall pick
- Drafted by: Milwaukee Bucks
- Playing career: 2016–2025
- Position: Point guard / shooting guard
- Number: 13, 7, 11, 15

Career history
- 2016–2019: Milwaukee Bucks
- 2019–2022: Indiana Pacers
- 2022–2023: Boston Celtics
- 2023–2024: Portland Trail Blazers
- 2024–2025: Washington Wizards

Career highlights
- NBA Sixth Man of the Year (2023); NBA Rookie of the Year (2017); NBA All-Rookie First Team (2017); Consensus first-team All-American (2016); Consensus second-team All-American (2015); NABC Defensive Player of the Year (2016); ACC Player of the Year (2016); 3× First-team All-ACC (2014–2016); 2× ACC Defensive Player of the Year (2015, 2016); No. 15 retired by Virginia Cavaliers

Career statistics
- Points: 7,077 (15.3 ppg)
- Rebounds: 1,917 (4.1 rpg)
- Assists: 2,156 (4.7 apg)
- Stats at NBA.com
- Stats at Basketball Reference
Medals
Representing the United States
Pan American Games
Bronze medal – third place	2015 Toronto	National team

Malcolm Moses Brogdon (born December 11, 1992) is an American former professional basketball player who played in the National Basketball Association for nine seasons. He played college basketball for the Virginia Cavaliers under Tony Bennett.

As a senior in 2015–16, Brogdon was a consensus first-team All-American. He was also named the Atlantic Coast Conference (ACC) Player of the Year and Defensive Player of the Year, becoming the first player in conference history to earn both honors in the same season.

Brogdon was selected in the second round of the 2016 NBA draft by the Milwaukee Bucks with the 36th overall pick. He went on to win the NBA Rookie of the Year Award, becoming the first second-round pick in the NBA to win the award since 1965. In 2019, Brogdon became the eighth player in NBA history to achieve a 50–40–90 season. He also played for the Indiana Pacers, Boston Celtics, Portland Trail Blazers, and Washington Wizards. Brogdon was the 2023 NBA Sixth Man of the Year.

== College career ==
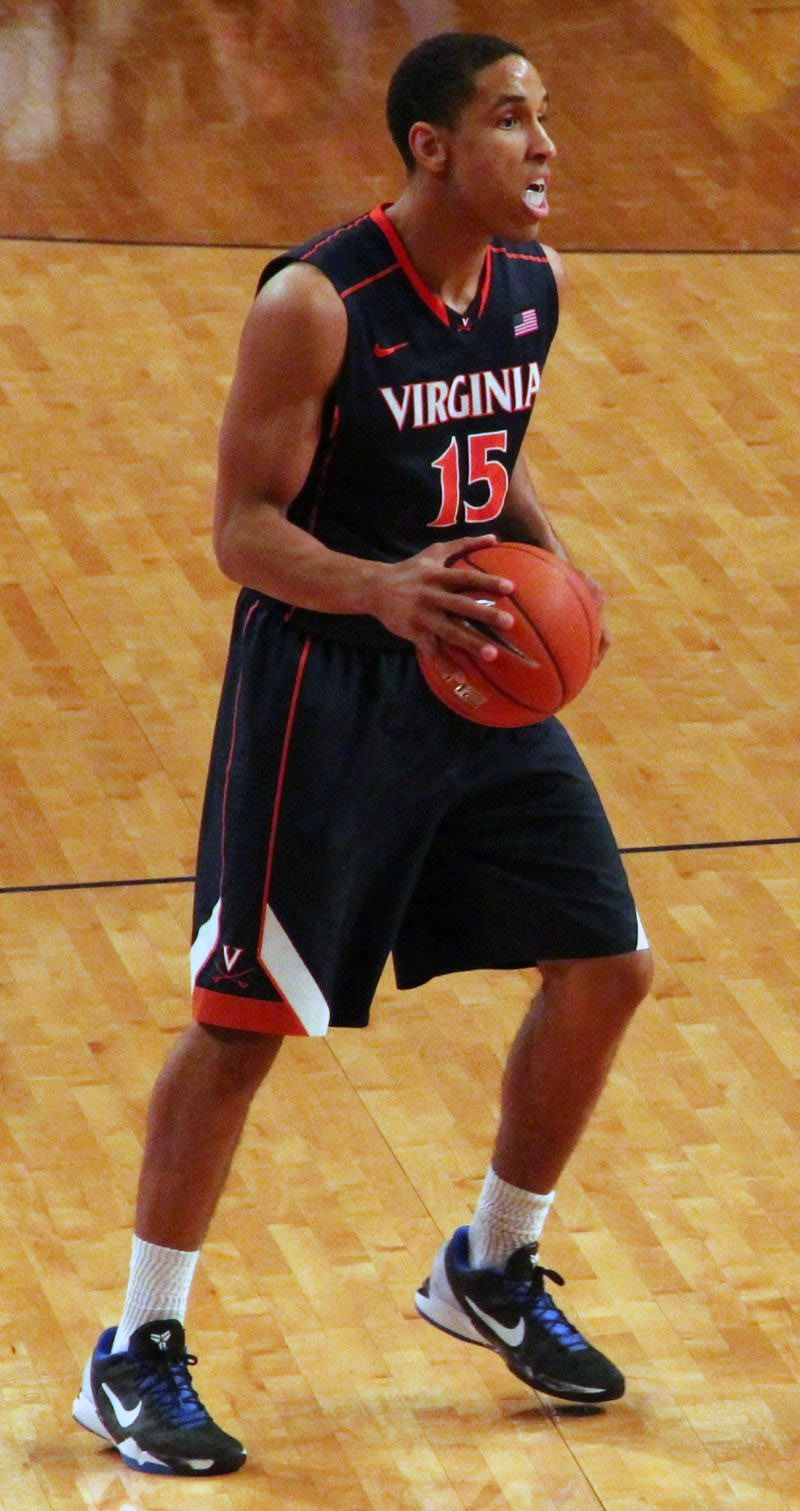
Brogdon in 2014

Brogdon, a top 100 recruit, committed to Virginia out of Greater Atlanta Christian School over offers from Arkansas, Georgia, and Notre Dame.

Brogdon redshirted his sophomore year after suffering a serious foot injury the prior season. He was known as one of the top contributors to the team's successful 2013–14 and 2014–15 seasons. In the 2013–14 season, Brogdon averaged 12.7 points, 5.4 rebounds, and 2.7 assists per game. In 2014–15, he was named as a consensus second-team All-American, as well as the first-team All-ACC and ACC Co-Defensive Player of the Year.

As a senior at Virginia in 2015–16, Brogdon was named to the 35-man midseason watchlist for the Naismith Trophy, and earned numerous prestigious awards, including ACC Player of the Year, ACC Defensive Player of the Year, first-team All-American, and a finalist for the Naismith Award. Brogdon graduated from Virginia with a B.A. degree in history in 2015 and an M.P.P. degree in 2016. His college jersey number, 15, was retired on February 20, 2017.

== Professional career ==
=== Milwaukee Bucks (2016–2019) ===
==== 2016–17 season: Rookie of the Year ====
On June 23, 2016, Brogdon was selected by the Milwaukee Bucks with the 36th overall pick in the 2016 NBA draft. On July 30, he signed with the Bucks. Brogdon made his NBA debut in the Bucks' season opener on October 26, recording eight points and five assists in 21 minutes in a 107–96 loss to the Charlotte Hornets. Six days later, he recorded 14 points and four steals in a 117–113 victory over the New Orleans Pelicans. On December 23, Brogdon made all seven of his shots for 17 points to go with seven assists in 29 minutes in a 123–96 victory over the Washington Wizards. Eight days later, he recorded his first career triple-double with 15 points, 11 rebounds and 12 assists in a 116–96 victory over the Chicago Bulls. On January 8, 2017, Brogdon scored a career-high 22 points in a 107–101 loss to the Washington Wizards. On January 23, he had his second game of the season with four steals in a 127–114 victory over the Houston Rockets. Two days later, Brogdon was named in the U.S. Team for the 2017 Rising Stars Challenge. On March 29, 2017, he recorded 16 points and nine assists in a 103–100 victory over the Boston Celtics. Brogdon had six key points and two assists in the final 2:46 to help Milwaukee fend off a late Boston rally. To conclude his rookie season, Brogdon was named the 2016–17 NBA Rookie of the Year, along with being a unanimous selection to the NBA All-Rookie First Team. Brogdon joined Kareem Abdul-Jabbar (1969–70) as the only players in Bucks history to win Rookie of the Year, and became the first player drafted in the second round to win Rookie of the Year since 1965. Brogdon averaged both the fewest points per game and fewest minutes per game of any winner in the award's history.

==== 2017–18 season: Sophomore season ====
In the season-opener on October 18, 2017, Brogdon scored 19 points in a 108–100 victory over the Boston Celtics. On November 3, he had a season-high 10 assists to go with 21 points against the Detroit Pistons. Four days later, Brogdon scored a season-high 22 points against the Cleveland Cavaliers. On January 22, 2018, he scored a career-high 32 points in a 109–105 victory over the Phoenix Suns. It was the first 30-point game for a Virginia basketball alum since Mike Scott in 2014 with the Atlanta Hawks. On February 2, Brogdon was ruled out for six to eight weeks after suffering a partially torn left quadriceps tendon the previous night against the Minnesota Timberwolves. On April 9, he returned to action following a 30-game absence. Brogdon scored two points and played 13 minutes, all in the first half, in the Bucks' 102–86 victory over the Orlando Magic.

==== 2018–19 season: 50–40–90 season ====
On November 28, 2018, Brogdon scored 24 points in 29 minutes on 6-for-6 three-point field goal shooting in a 116–113 victory over the Chicago Bulls. On February 27, 2019, he scored 25 points, including 9-for-11 from the field, in a 141–140 overtime victory over the Sacramento Kings. Brogdon enjoyed the best shooting year of his career, and one of the most efficient in NBA history: Brogdon became just the eighth NBA player ever to achieve a 50–40–90 season and led the league in free throw percentage (.928). However, on March 16, he was ruled out indefinitely with a plantar fascia tear in his right foot. Brogdon returned to action late in the second round of the playoffs.

=== Indiana Pacers (2019–2022) ===
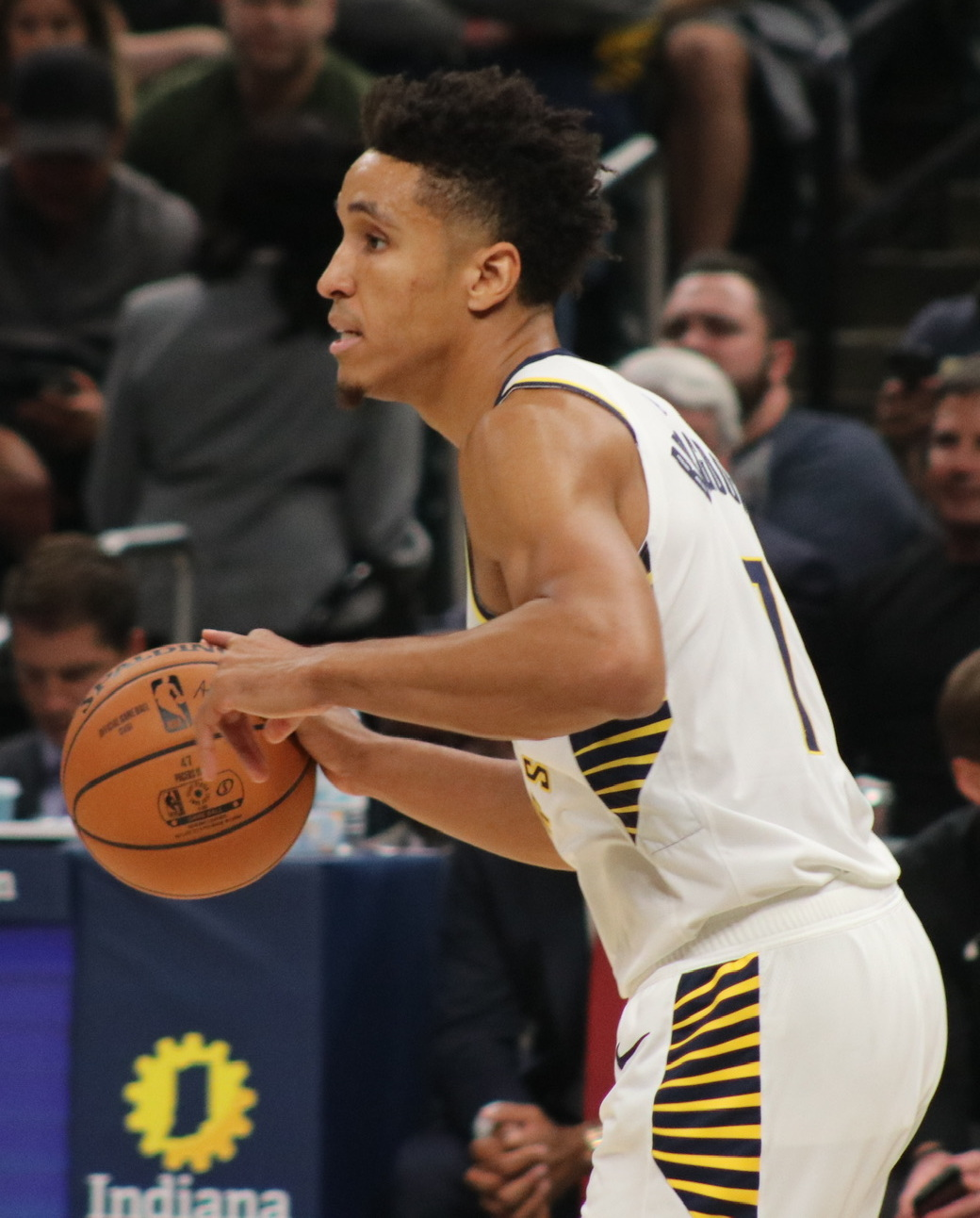
Brogdon with the Indiana Pacers in 2019

On June 29, 2019, the Bucks extended a qualifying offer to Brogdon in order to make him a restricted free agent. On July 6, Brogdon signed with the Indiana Pacers via a sign-and-trade with the Milwaukee Bucks in exchange for future picks. He signed a contract with the Pacers for $85.0 million over four years (average of $21.25 million per year).

New to starting at the point guard position, Brogdon studied tape of former NBA All-Star Isiah Thomas in the off-season. Brogdon had a double-double in each of his first four games in a Pacers uniform. After his first week with the Pacers, Brogdon led the NBA in assists and become the first NBA player in history to tally at least 20 points and 10 assists in both of his first two games with a new team. On October 26, 2019, Brogdon had 30 points (on 12-for-18 shooting) and 10 assists in a 110–99 loss to the Cleveland Cavaliers. On June 24, 2020, Brogdon announced that he tested positive for the COVID-19 virus.

On January 2, 2021, Brogdon scored 33 points with seven assists in a 106–102 loss to the New York Knicks. Two days later, he put up 21 points, 11 assists, seven rebounds, three steals, and one block, alongside a game-winning layup, in a 118–116 overtime victory over the New Orleans Pelicans. On January 6, Brogdon scored a career-high 35 points, along with seven assists in a 114–107 victory over the Houston Rockets. On January 25, he surpassed his career high with 36 points in the Pacers' 129–114 victory over the Toronto Raptors.

On October 18, 2021, Brogdon signed a two-year, $45 million extension through the 2024–25 season. In his third season with the Pacers, Brogdon was asked to be more of a leader on and off the court. He missed 41 games from December through April with Achilles pain. Even with the significant time he missed, Brogdon led the team in scoring for the second straight year, while being second in assists per game.

=== Boston Celtics (2022–2023) ===
On July 9, 2022, Brogdon was traded to the Boston Celtics in exchange for Aaron Nesmith, Daniel Theis, Nik Stauskas, Malik Fitts, Juwan Morgan, and a 2023 first-round draft pick. Brogdon had been given the choice to be traded to the Celtics or the Toronto Raptors. For the first time in his career, Brogdon chose to accept a bench role as the Celtics' sixth man. On October 18, he had 16 points off the bench in his debut for his new team in a 126–117 win over the Philadelphia 76ers. On January 14, 2023, Brogdon scored a season-high 30 points on 11-of-17 shooting from the field and 4-of-6 from three-point range against the Charlotte Hornets. On April 20, he was named the NBA Sixth Man of the Year. During the Eastern Conference Finals against the Miami Heat, Brogdon played through an arm injury that was later revealed to be a partial tear of a tendon in his right elbow.

On June 21, 2023, it was reported that Brogdon would be sent to the Los Angeles Clippers in a three-team trade involving the Washington Wizards. However, reports later that day stated that the trade had fallen through, largely due to the Clippers raising concerns about Brogdon's injury status. In the following months, reports came out stating that Brogdon was unhappy with the Celtics due to his involvement in the failed trade. Celtics head coach Joe Mazzulla stated that the team was going through a "healing process" with Brogdon.

=== Portland Trail Blazers (2023–2024) ===
On October 1, 2023, Brogdon, along with Robert Williams III and two future first-round draft picks, was traded to the Portland Trail Blazers in exchange for Jrue Holiday. On October 25, Brogdon made his Blazers debut, putting up 20 points in a 123–111 loss to the Los Angeles Clippers.

=== Washington Wizards (2024–2025) ===
On July 6, 2024, Brogdon, along with the 14th pick in the 2024 NBA draft (Bub Carrington), a 2029 first-round pick swap, and two second-round picks, were traded to the Washington Wizards in exchange for Deni Avdija.

After signing with the New York Knicks on a training camp deal, Brogdon ultimately decided to retire from basketball on October 15, 2025, which he announced through ESPN.

== National team career ==
Brogdon represented the United States national team at the 2015 Pan American Games, where he won a bronze medal.

== Career statistics ==
Legend
GP	Games played	GS	Games started	MPG	Minutes per game
FG%	Field goal percentage	3P%	3-point field goal percentage	FT%	Free throw percentage
RPG	Rebounds per game	APG	Assists per game	SPG	Steals per game
BPG	Blocks per game	PPG	Points per game	**Bold**	Career high
*	Led the league

=== NBA ===
==== Regular season ====
Year	Team	GP	GS	MPG	FG%	3P%	FT%	RPG	APG	SPG	BPG	PPG
2016–17	Milwaukee	**75**	28	26.4	.457	.404	.865	2.8	4.2	**1.1**	.2	10.2
2017–18	Milwaukee	48	20	29.9	.485	.385	.882	3.3	3.2	.9	.3	13.0
2018–19	Milwaukee	64	**64**	28.6	**.505**	.426	**.928***	4.5	3.2	.7	.2	15.6
2019–20	Indiana	54	54	30.9	.438	.326	.892	4.9	**7.1**	.6	.2	16.5
2020–21	Indiana	56	56	**34.5**	.453	.388	.864	**5.3**	5.9	.9	.3	**21.2**
2021–22	Indiana	36	36	33.5	.448	.312	.856	5.1	5.9	.8	**.4**	19.1
2022–23	Boston	67	0	26.0	.484	**.444**	.870	4.2	3.7	.7	.3	14.9
2023–24	Portland	39	25	28.7	.440	.412	.819	3.8	5.5	.7	.2	15.7
2024–25	Washington	24	13	23.5	.433	.286	.880	3.8	4.1	.5	.2	12.7
Career		463	296	29.1	.463	.388	.874	4.1	4.7	.8	.2	15.3

==== Playoffs ====
Year	Team	GP	GS	MPG	FG%	3P%	FT%	RPG	APG	SPG	BPG	PPG
2017	Milwaukee	6	**6**	30.5	.400	**.476**	—	4.3	3.5	.5	**.3**	9.0
2018	Milwaukee	7	5	26.6	.436	.263	.800	3.4	2.4	.1	.0	8.7
2019	Milwaukee	7	2	28.3	**.449**	.378	.636	**4.9**	3.4	.7	.1	13.0
2020	Indiana	4	4	**40.0**	.400	.375	**.893**	4.3	**10.0**	**1.0**	.0	**21.5**
2023	Boston	**19**	0	24.9	.418	.379	.829	3.5	2.9	.2	**.3**	11.9
Career		43	17	27.9	.421	.378	.821	3.9	3.7	.4	.2	12.0

=== College ===
Year	Team	GP	GS	MPG	FG%	3P%	FT%	RPG	APG	SPG	BPG	PPG
2011–12	Virginia	28	1	22.4	.396	.324	.800	2.8	1.4	.5	.1	6.7
2013–14	Virginia	**37**	**37**	31.4	.413	.370	.875	**5.4**	2.7	**1.2**	.1	12.7
2014–15	Virginia	34	34	32.5	.412	.344	**.879**	3.9	2.4	.7	**.4**	14.0
2015–16	Virginia	**37**	**37**	**33.9**	**.474**	**.411**	.878	4.2	**2.8**	.9	.2	**18.2**
Career		136	109	30.6	.430	.365	.876	4.1	2.5	.9	.2	13.3

== Personal life ==
Brogdon's father, Mitchell Gino Brogdon Sr., is a lawyer and mediator best known as the host of the syndicated court show Personal Injury Court. Dr. Jann Adams, Brogdon's mother, is the former chair of Morehouse College's Psychology Department. She is now the associate dean of science and math. His parents divorced when he was 11. Both of Brogdon's brothers, Gino Jr and John are practicing attorneys.

Brogdon is nicknamed "The President", due to his professional demeanor and master's degree in public policy from the Batten School of Leadership and Public Policy at the University of Virginia.

On March 31, 2026, Brogdon was named Strategic Advisor to Men's Basketball for University of Virginia.

=== Community involvement ===
In 2018, Brogdon partnered with The Chris Long Foundation on their Hoops2O initiative, a program aimed at addressing the clean-water crisis, particularly in Africa. As of May 2019, $274,200 had been raised for the cause. Brogdon is a member of the "Starting Five", along with Joe Harris, Justin Anderson, Anthony Tolliver, and Garrett Temple, who initially made a goal to raise $225,000 through Hoops2O to fund five wells in East Africa by the end of the 2018–19 season. Brogdon traveled with Anderson and Harris to Tanzania to witness the opening of the first well they funded in July 2019, and by November Hoops2O had raised nearly $400,000. By February 2020, the program had funded the construction of ten wells in Tanzania and Kenya, bringing water to over 52,000 citizens. Brogdon founded his own nonprofit, The Brogdon Family Foundation, in 2020.

== See also ==
- List of NBA annual free throw percentage leaders
