= Gino Brogdon =

American judge and TV personality

- Education: Oberlin College; Indiana University
- Occupations: Judge, mediator and television personality
- Years active: 2019–present
- Known for: Personal Injury Court
- Children: 3, including Malcolm Brogdon
- Parents: Norman Brogdon (father); Hilda Pough Lee Brogdon (mother)

Mitchell Gino Brogdon Sr. is an American judge and television personality. He was the presiding judge of the court show, Personal Injury Court, and the father of former professional basketball player Malcolm Brogdon.

== Career ==
Brogdon earned his Bachelor of Arts from Oberlin College in 1983. He then earned his Juris Doctor from Indiana University School of Law in Bloomington in 1986. Brogdon became a member of the State Bar of Georgia and the American Bar Association in 1987.

He was a legal analyst for CNN and is a mediator with Henning Mediation & Arbitration Services.

In 2019, he became the host of the American daytime reality court show, Personal Injury Court. The show featured acted cases involving personal injury.
