= Dave Bliss (basketball, born 1986) =

Basketball coach

Oklahoma City Thunder
- Position: Assistant coach
- League: NBA

Personal information
- Born: April 28, 1986 (age 40) Wausau, Wisconsin, U.S.
- Listed height: 6 ft 10 in (2.08 m)
- Listed weight: 255 lb (116 kg)

Career information
- High school: Wausau West (Wausau, Wisconsin)
- College: Georgia (2004–2008)
- NBA draft: 2008: undrafted
- Coaching career: 2008–present

Career history

Coaching
- 2008–2009: Georgia (volunteer assistant)
- 2009–2010: VCU (graduate assistant)
- 2010–2015: Oklahoma City Thunder (video analyst/player development)
- 2015–2018: New York Knicks (player development)
- 2016–2017: German senior men's national team
- 2018–2019: Oklahoma City Thunder (senior player development)
- 2019–present: Oklahoma City Thunder (assistant)

Career highlights
- As assistant coach: NBA champion (2025); NBA All-Star Game head coach (2025)

David John Bliss (born April 28, 1986) is an American professional basketball coach who serves as an assistant coach for the Oklahoma City Thunder. He was previously a player development coach for the Oklahoma City Thunder and the New York Knicks, an assistant coach for the German senior men's national team, a graduate assistant for Virginia Commonwealth University, and a volunteer assistant for the University of Georgia.

== Early life and college career ==
Bliss attended Wausau West (Wis.) High School, where he was a standout basketball player and the valedictorian of the class of 2004. He was a lightly recruited two star prospect, but earned a scholarship offer to play at the University of Georgia. Bliss was a four-year starter and three year team captain for the Bulldogs. He was named Co-MVP of the 07–08 team that won the SEC tournament championship and participated in the NCAA tournament. That same year, he was awarded SEC scholar athlete of the year and won the Dick Copas Leadership Award, an award given to one male student at Georgia who demonstrates exceptional leadership and commitment to his program.

== Coaching career ==
Following his senior season at Georgia, Bliss became a volunteer assistant for then-head coach Dennis Felton. The next season, Bliss joined the Virginia Commonwealth staff with former Georgia assistant, Mike Jones. The head coach of VCU, Shaka Smart, was intrigued by Bliss' former playing style and unusual size that he could bring to his coaching staff stating, “I remembered Dave was a really cerebral player. Also, you don't get a lot of coaching candidates that are that size." Throughout the season NBA scouts watched VCU's star player, Larry Sanders, an eventual 1st round draft pick. Current Oklahoma City Thunder general manager Sam Presti was one of the executives that followed Sanders that season. While scouting Sanders, Presti became impressed with Bliss' abilities. Following VCU's season, Presti hired Bliss as a video analyst and player development assistant. Bliss stayed with the Thunder as a video analyst and player development coach from 2010 to 2015. His time with the Thunder included one trip to the NBA Finals and two trips to the Western Conference Finals. Bliss' next stop was with the New York Knicks. As a player development coach, he prepared opposing team scouting reports, led drill work for players during practice and game days, and oversaw summer development activities for players. During the 2016 and 2017 NBA offseason, Bliss served as an assistant coach for the German senior men's national team. In 2018, he rejoined the Thunder as a senior player development coach. After one season in the role, Bliss was promoted to assistant coach on the Thunder staff. Bliss was the head coach for the Thunder at the 2019 NBA Summer League. In November 2021, Bliss served as the Thunder's interim head coach for a three-game road trip due to Thunder head coach, Mark Daigneault, tending to the birth of his child.
