= Colby Jones =

American basketball player (born 2002)

Free agent
- Position: Shooting guard

Personal information
- Born: May 28, 2002 (age 24) Birmingham, Alabama, U.S.
- Listed height: 6 ft 6 in (1.98 m)
- Listed weight: 207 lb (94 kg)

Career information
- High school: Pinson Valley (Pinson, Alabama); Mountain Brook (Mountain Brook, Alabama)
- College: Xavier (2020–2023)
- NBA draft: 2023: 2nd round, 34th overall pick
- Drafted by: Charlotte Hornets
- Playing career: 2023–present

Career history
- 2023–2025: Sacramento Kings
- 2023–2025: →Stockton Kings
- 2025: Washington Wizards
- 2025: →Capital City Go-Go
- 2025: Detroit Pistons
- 2026: Memphis Hustle

Career highlights
- NIT champion (2022); NIT MVP (2022); Second-team All-Big East (2023); Big East All-Freshman Team (2021)
- Stats at NBA.com
- Stats at Basketball Reference

Colby Everette Jones (born May 28, 2002) is an American professional basketball player who last played for Memphis Hustle of the NBA G League. He played college basketball for the Xavier Musketeers.

== High school career ==
Jones played basketball for Pinson Valley High School in Pinson, Alabama. As a sophomore, he averaged 23.9 points, 7.9 rebounds, and 3.9 assists per game. After a coaching change at Pinson, he transferred to Mountain Brook High School in Mountain Brook, Alabama for his junior season to play under coach Bucky McMillan. Jones averaged 14 points, five rebounds and three assists per game as a junior. He played alongside Trendon Watford and helped the school win its third straight Class 7A state title. In his senior season, Jones assumed a leading role and averaged 25.2 points, 7.8 rebounds, 3.2 assists, and 2.5 steals per game, helping Mountain Brook to a Class 7A runner-up finish. He was named Over the Mountain Journal Player of the Year, All-South Metro Player of the Year and Alabama Class 7A Player of the Year. A four-star recruit, he committed to playing college basketball for Xavier over offers from Alabama, Auburn, Georgia and UAB.

== College career ==
Jones missed the first five games of his freshman season at Xavier due to COVID-19 contact tracing. On January 10, 2021, he made a game-winning three-pointer in the final second of a 74–73 win against Providence. On February 16, he scored a season-high 20 points and had six rebounds in a 93–84 loss to St. John's. As a freshman, Jones averaged 7.7 points, 4.8 rebounds and 2.9 assists per game, and was selected to the Big East All-Freshman Team.

== Professional career ==
=== Sacramento / Stockton Kings (2023–25) ===
Jones was drafted 34th overall by the Charlotte Hornets in the 2023 NBA draft. During the draft, the Boston Celtics traded for his draft rights, and then subsequently traded him to the Sacramento Kings for the draft rights to Jordan Walsh and a 2024 second-round pick. Throughout his rookie and sophomore seasons, he was assigned several times to the Stockton Kings. Jones made 30 appearances for Sacramento during the 2023–24 NBA season, averaging 2.1 points, 1.3 rebounds, and 0.7 assists.

Jones played in 39 contests for the Kings during the 2024–25 NBA season, averaging 1.1 points, 1.0 rebound, and 0.3 assists.

=== Washington Wizards (2025) ===
On February 6, 2025, Jones was traded to the Washington Wizards in a multi-team deal. He made 15 appearances for the Wizards, averaging 8.7 points, 4.3 rebounds, and 2.5 assists.

=== Detroit Pistons / Motor City Cruise (2025) ===
On June 28, 2025, Jones was traded to the Oklahoma City Thunder in exchange for Dillon Jones and a 2029 second-round pick. He was waived by the Thunder the same day. On July 29, Jones signed a two-way contract with the Detroit Pistons. He made one appearance for the Pistons, recording two points and four rebounds in a 95–116 loss to the Cleveland Cavaliers on October 27. On November 10, Jones was waived by Detroit following the signing of Wendell Moore Jr.

On July 27, 2026, Jones signed with Manresa of the Liga ACB and the EuroCup. However, the club would later announce Jones' contract was terminated due to medical reasons.

== Career statistics ==
Legend
GP	Games played	GS	Games started	MPG	Minutes per game
FG%	Field goal percentage	3P%	3-point field goal percentage	FT%	Free throw percentage
RPG	Rebounds per game	APG	Assists per game	SPG	Steals per game
BPG	Blocks per game	PPG	Points per game	**Bold**	Career high

=== NBA ===
Year	Team	GP	GS	MPG	FG%	3P%	FT%	RPG	APG	SPG	BPG	PPG
2023–24	Sacramento	**30**	0	6.4	.394	.091	.545	1.3	.7	.2	.2	2.1
2024–25	Sacramento	24	0	5.4	.423	**.400**	–	1.0	.3	.3	.3	1.1
2024–25	Washington	15	0	**25.7**	**.466**	.308	**.657**	**4.3**	**2.5**	**1.3**	**.4**	**8.7**
2025–26	Detroit	1	0	7.0	.333	.000	–	4.0	2.0	.0	.0	2.0
Career		70	0	10.2	.433	.247	.630	1.9	.9	.5	.3	3.2

=== College ===
Year	Team	GP	GS	MPG	FG%	3P%	FT%	RPG	APG	SPG	BPG	PPG
2020–21	Xavier	15	11	27.8	.464	.333	**.757**	4.8	2.9	1.3	.3	7.7
2021–22	Xavier	35	35	33.5	.483	.292	.680	**7.3**	3.2	**1.5**	.5	11.6
2022–23	Xavier	**36**	**36**	**34.0**	**.509**	**.378**	.653	5.7	**4.4**	1.3	**.6**	**15.0**
Career		86	82	32.7	.494	.344	.679	6.2	3.6	1.4	.5	12.3

== Personal life ==
Jones' father, Chad, played college basketball for UAB. His older brother, C. J., played basketball for Arkansas and Middle Tennessee in college before embarking on a professional career.
