= Kyshawn George =

Swiss Canadian basketball player (born 2003)

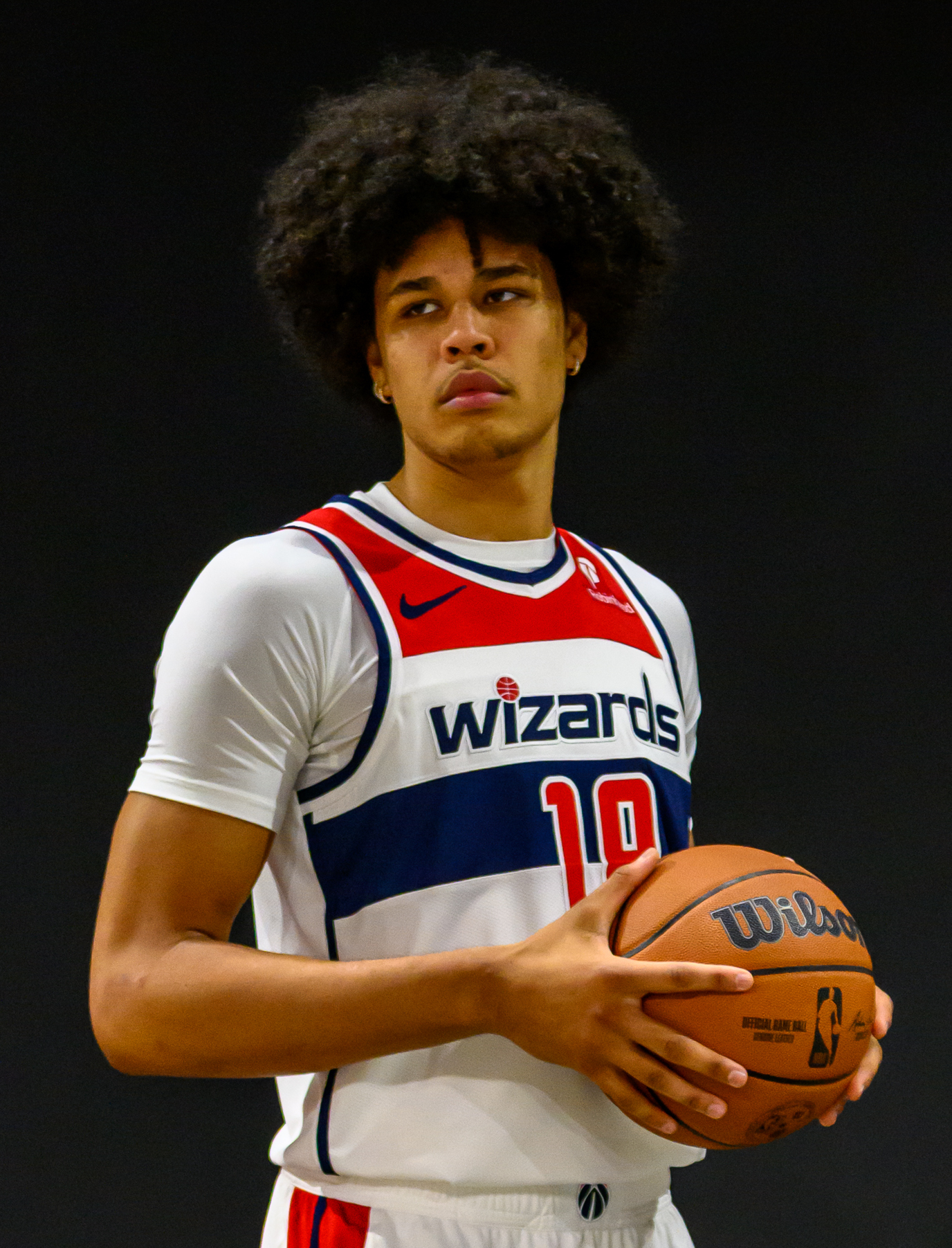
- George with the Washington Wizards in 2025

No. 18 – Washington Wizards
- Position: Small forward
- League: NBA

Personal information
- Born: 12 December 2003 (age 22) Monthey, Switzerland
- Listed height: 6 ft 8 in (2.03 m)
- Listed weight: 200 lb (91 kg)

Career information
- High school: Lycée Emiland Gauthey (Chalon-sur-Saône, France)
- College: Miami (Florida) (2023–2024)
- NBA draft: 2024: 1st round, 24th overall pick
- Drafted by: New York Knicks
- Playing career: 2022–present

Career history
- 2022–2023: Élan Chalon
- 2024–present: Washington Wizards
- Stats at NBA.com
- Stats at Basketball Reference

Kyshawn Shanty Alonzo George (born 12 December 2003) is a Swiss-Canadian professional basketball player for the Washington Wizards of the National Basketball Association (NBA). He played college basketball for the Miami Hurricanes.

== Early life and career ==
George was born on 12 December 2003 and grew up in Monthey, Switzerland. His father, Deon George, was born and raised in Montreal, Canada, and played professional basketball in Switzerland.

George was part of the team that won the Swiss U16 basketball championship in 2016. He later moved to France and played four years with the club Élan Chalon. George played mainly for the U18 team from 2019–20 to 2020–21 before then playing for the U21 team in 2021–22 and 2022–23, also spending time with the first-team squad in his last season. He averaged 11.1 points and two rebounds per game in 2021–22 and had 17.6 points, 6.5 rebounds, 3.8 assists, and 2.4 steals per game with the team in 2022–23, being named first-team All-U21 Espoir Pro B. With the first team, he averaged 2.9 points and appeared in 16 games in 2022–23.

George attended Lycée Emiland Gauthey in Chalon-sur-Saône, France. He had a growth spurt in high school, going from a height of 5 feet 8 inches (1.73 m) to 6 feet 5 inches (1.96 m) and 6 feet 7 inches (2.01 m) by the time he entered college. He committed to playing college basketball in the United States for the Miami Hurricanes in April 2023, being ranked a three-star recruit.

== College career ==
Initially a backup, George became a starter midway through his freshman season at Miami due to injuries. He soon became a top player and received attention as a potential 2024 NBA draft prospect. Following his freshman season, he declared for the 2024 NBA draft and received a green room invite.

== Professional career ==
On June 26, 2024, George was selected with the 24th overall pick by the New York Knicks in the 2024 NBA draft; however, immediately on draft night, he was traded for the 26th and 51st overall picks in the 2024 draft. On July 6, he signed with the Wizards. He played his first NBA game on October 24, in a game against the Boston Celtics.

George made his 100th three-pointer on his 59th game on March 13, 2025, marking the fastest a Wizards rookie has hit that milestone. Previously, Bradley Beal held that record with 100 threes made in 60 games. George also holds the franchise record of most consecutive games with a made three-pointer by a rookie, with 31. The previous record was held by Corey Kispert, with 15. In 68 appearances (38 starts) for Washington during the 2024–25 NBA season, he averaged 8.7 points, 4.2 rebounds, and 2.5 assists.

On October 24, 2025, George scored a career-high 34 points on 11-of-15 shooting in a victory over the Dallas Mavericks; he also recorded 11 rebounds, four assists, two steals, and three blocks in the game. He made 48 starts for the Wizards during the regular season, recording averages of 14.8 points, 5.1 rebounds, and 4.5 assists. On March 4, 2026, George was diagnosed with a partial tear of the ulnar collateral ligament in his left elbow. On April 2, Washington confirmed that George would miss the remainder of the year due to the injury.

== National career ==
George plays for the Canada men’s national basketball team in the 2027 FIBA Basketball World Cup Qualifiers in the July window.

== Career statistics ==
Legend
GP	Games played	GS	Games started	MPG	Minutes per game
FG%	Field goal percentage	3P%	3-point field goal percentage	FT%	Free throw percentage
RPG	Rebounds per game	APG	Assists per game	SPG	Steals per game
BPG	Blocks per game	PPG	Points per game	**Bold**	Career high

=== NBA ===
Year	Team	GP	GS	MPG	FG%	3P%	FT%	RPG	APG	SPG	BPG	PPG
2024–25	Washington	**68**	38	26.5	.372	.322	.753	4.2	2.5	**1.0**	.7	8.7
2025–26	Washington	48	**48**	**29.0**	**.438**	**.381**	**.802**	**5.1**	**4.5**	**1.0**	**.9**	**14.8**
Career		116	86	27.5	.406	.347	.781	4.6	3.3	1.0	.8	11.2

=== College ===
Year	Team	GP	GS	MPG	FG%	3P%	FT%	RPG	APG	SPG	BPG	PPG
2023–24	Miami	31	16	23.0	.426	.408	.778	3.0	2.2	.9	.4	7.6
