= Justin Champagnie =

American basketball player (born 2001)

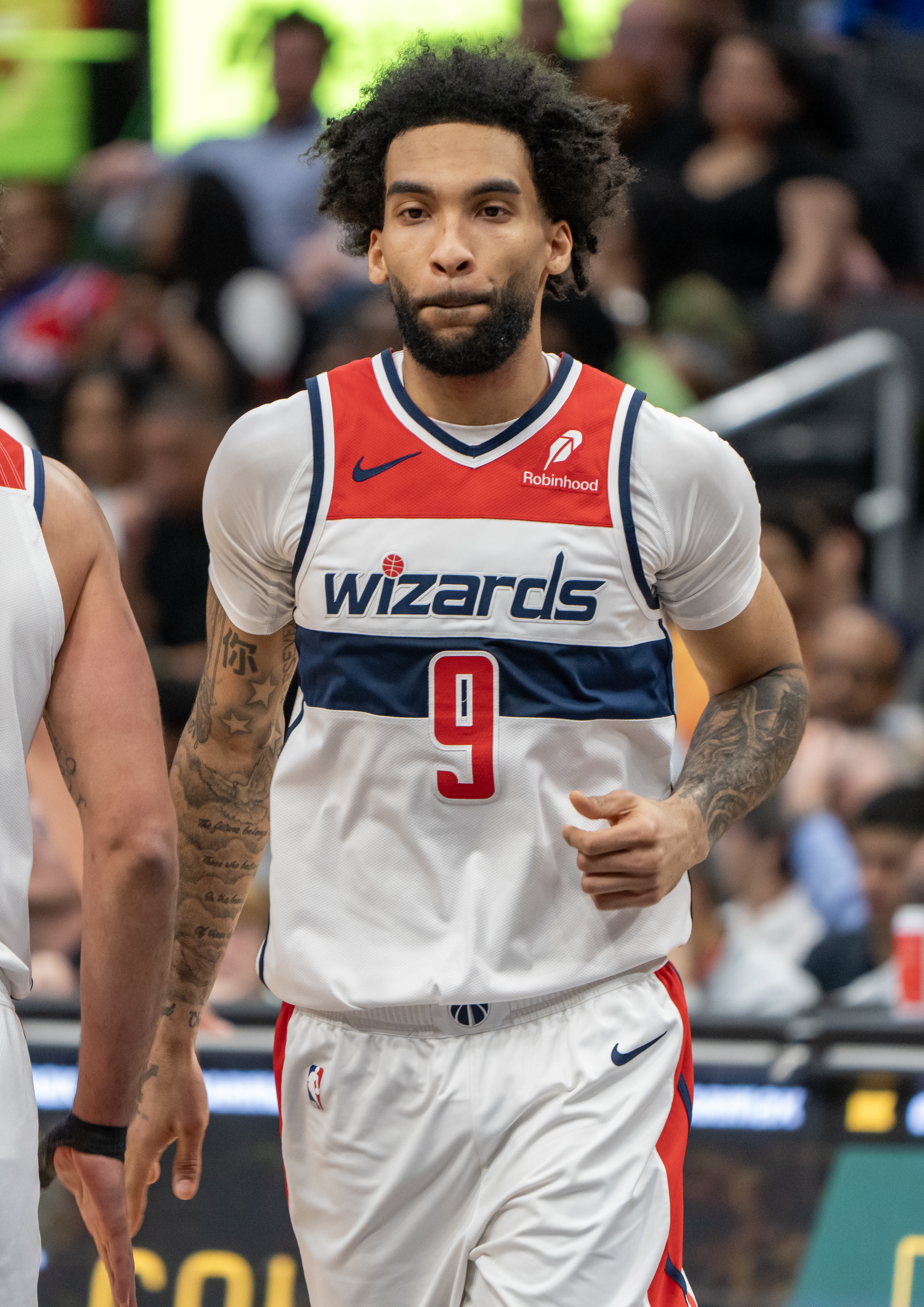
- Champagnie with the Washington Wizards in 2026

No. 9 – Washington Wizards
- Position: Shooting guard / small forward
- League: NBA

Personal information
- Born: June 29, 2001 (age 25) Brooklyn, New York, U.S.
- Listed height: 6 ft 6 in (1.98 m)
- Listed weight: 206 lb (93 kg)

Career information
- High school: Bishop Loughlin (Brooklyn, New York)
- College: Pittsburgh (2019–2021)
- NBA draft: 2021: undrafted
- Playing career: 2021–present

Career history
- 2021–2022: Toronto Raptors
- 2021–2022: →Raptors 905
- 2023: Sioux Falls Skyforce
- 2023: Boston Celtics
- 2023–2024: Sioux Falls Skyforce
- 2024–present: Washington Wizards
- 2024: →Capital City Go-Go

Career highlights
- All-NBA G League Second Team (2024); First-team All-ACC (2021)
- Stats at NBA.com
- Stats at Basketball Reference

Justin John Champagnie (/ˌʃæmˈpɛni/ sham-PEH-nee; born June 29, 2001) is an American professional basketball player for the Washington Wizards of the National Basketball Association (NBA). He played college basketball for the Pittsburgh Panthers.

== Early life and high school career ==
Champagnie was born in New York, New York and grew up in Brooklyn. He attended Bishop Loughlin Memorial High School. As a senior, he averaged 19.8 points per game and was named first team Class AA All-State. A three-star recruit, he committed to playing college basketball for Pittsburgh over offers from Cincinnati, Dayton, Seton Hall, Saint Louis and Rutgers.

== College career ==
As a true freshman, Champagnie led the Panthers with 12.7 points and 7 rebounds per game. He was named the CBS Sports/USBWA National Freshman of the Week and the ACC Freshman of the Week after averaging 25 points and 10 rebounds in games against Notre Dame and Georgia Tech. On December 22, 2020, Champagnie was ruled out for at least six weeks after sustaining a knee injury during practice. On January 19, 2021, he recorded 31 points and 14 rebounds in a 79–73 win over Duke. At the conclusion of the regular season, Champagnie was selected to the First Team All-ACC. As a sophomore, Champagnie averaged 18 points, 11.1 rebounds, 1.6 assists, 1.3 steals and 1.3 blocks per game. Following the season, he declared for the 2021 NBA draft, forgoing his remaining college eligibility.

== Professional career ==
=== Toronto Raptors / Raptors 905 (2021–2022) ===
Champagnie was projected as a late first-round pick to an early second-round pick in the 2021 NBA draft. After going undrafted during the 2021 NBA draft, Champagnie signed a two-way contract with the Toronto Raptors on August 7, 2021, splitting time with their G League affiliate, Raptors 905. With Scottie Barnes injured and unable to play, Champagnie was called by the Raptors to make his professional debut on November 1, 2021, scoring his first two points in the NBA on free throws in a win against the New York Knicks. Champagnie during his time in Toronto was mentored by All-NBA forward Pascal Siakam and became close with Champagnie seeing Siakam as a big brother.

On July 14, 2022, Champagnie re-signed with the Raptors on a two-year contract. On December 29, he was waived by the Raptors.

=== Sioux Falls Skyforce (2023) ===
On January 10, 2023, Champagnie was claimed off waivers by the Sioux Falls Skyforce of the NBA G League.

=== Boston Celtics (2023) ===
On April 7, 2023, Champagnie signed with the Boston Celtics. He appeared in two games for Boston, recording averages of 2.5 points, 2.0 rebounds, and 1.5 assists. On July 31, Champagnie was waived by the Celtics.

=== Return to Sioux Falls (2023–2024) ===
On August 11, 2023, Champagnie signed with the Miami Heat, but was waived on October 21, prior to the start of the 2023–24 season. Nine days later, he returned to the Sioux Falls Skyforce.

=== Washington Wizards / Capital City Go-Go (2024–present) ===
On February 22, 2024, Champagnie signed a 10-day contract with the Washington Wizards and on March 3, he signed a two-way contract.

On February 10, 2025, Justin played against his twin brother Julian for the first time in an NBA game, when the Wizards met the San Antonio Spurs. They are among a very small number of twins who have ever played against one another in an NBA game. On March 2, Champagnie and the Wizards agreed to a four-year, $10 million contract.

== Career statistics ==
Legend
GP	Games played	GS	Games started	MPG	Minutes per game
FG%	Field goal percentage	3P%	3-point field goal percentage	FT%	Free throw percentage
RPG	Rebounds per game	APG	Assists per game	SPG	Steals per game
BPG	Blocks per game	PPG	Points per game	**Bold**	Career high

=== NBA ===
==== Regular season ====
Year	Team	GP	GS	MPG	FG%	3P%	FT%	RPG	APG	SPG	BPG	PPG
2021–22	Toronto	36	0	7.8	.463	.357	**1.000**	2.0	.3	.2	.1	2.3
2022–23	Toronto	3	0	3.6	**1.000**	—	—	1.3	.3	.0	.0	2.0
2022–23	Boston	2	0	11.7	.167	.200	—	2.0	**1.5**	.5	.0	2.5
2023–24	Washington	15	1	15.7	.410	.289	.800	3.5	1.3	.7	**.6**	5.9
2024–25	Washington	62	**31**	**21.6**	.511	**.383**	.685	**5.7**	1.0	**1.0**	**.6**	**8.8**
2025–26	Washington	**69**	19	20.0	.502	.319	.784	5.6	1.2	.9	**.6**	8.7
Career		187	51	17.5	.494	.346	.759	4.6	1.0	.8	.5	7.1

==== Playoffs ====
Year	Team	GP	GS	MPG	FG%	3P%	FT%	RPG	APG	SPG	BPG	PPG
2023	Boston	4	0	2.6	.250	.000	—	.0	.0	.0	.0	.5
Career		4	0	2.6	.250	.000	—	.0	.0	.0	.0	.5

=== College ===
Year	Team	GP	GS	MPG	FG%	3P%	FT%	RPG	APG	SPG	BPG	PPG
2019–20	Pittsburgh	**33**	**27**	32.9	.421	.262	**.777**	7.0	.7	1.1	.8	12.7
2020–21	Pittsburgh	20	19	**34.4**	**.477**	**.311**	.711	**11.1**	**1.6**	**1.2**	**1.3**	**18.0**
Career		53	46	33.4	.446	.280	.745	8.5	1.0	1.1	1.0	14.7

== Personal life ==
Champagnie was born in the United States and is of Jamaican descent. His identical twin brother, Julian, plays professional basketball for the San Antonio Spurs. He grew up with Kadary Richmond, with the two taking the bus together in middle school; they later became teammates on the Wizards in 2026.

Champagnie is a multi-generational New Yorker, raised in Kensington, Brooklyn. His mother's family is from Carroll Gardens, Brooklyn, and his father grew up in the Bronx after immigrating from Jamaica. His father, Ranford, played soccer for St. John's in the mid-1990s and was a member of the 1996 national championship team; Ranford is a professional soccer coach, and has coached the men's soccer teams of Baruch College and York College.

== See also ==
- List of All-Atlantic Coast Conference men's basketball teams
