= Personal Injury Court =

American reality court show (2019–2020)

- Genre: Nontraditional court show
- Presented by: Gino Brogdon
- Country of origin: United States
- Original language: English
- No. of seasons: 1
- No. of episodes: 120

Production
- Executive producers: David Armour and Barry Poznick
- Production locations: Georgia Public Broadcasting Studios, Atlanta, Georgia
- Camera setup: Multiple
- Running time: 30 minutes
- Production companies: 501 East Entertainment; Orion Television

Original release
- Network: Syndication
- Release: September 16, 2019 – February 26, 2020

Personal Injury Court is an American syndicated nontraditional court show in which personal injury lawyer Gino Brogdon heard and ruled on personal injury cases.

The show was produced by 501 East Entertainment and the re-launched Orion Television, and was distributed by MGM Domestic Television Distribution. Personal Injury Court was produced by David Armour and Barry Poznick and co-created by Armour and Gary Martin Hays.

== Show details ==
Personal Injury Court is a half-hour nontraditional reenacted court show. The show features cases involving personal injury. The show uses videos, testimonies, accident recreations and eye-witness accounts to determine verdicts. The show debuted on September 16, 2019. The show claimed to award some of the largest claims in television; however, the cases presented were inspired by actual litigation, with names and details changed. The executive producer claimed that real legal principles are used in the explanations. The participants are paid actors. The show airs in 47 of 50 the largest United States television markets. The show reached its highest ratings of the season to date during the week of February 23, 2020, which would ultimately be its last week of first-run episodes, when it earned a 0.7 rating.

Personal Injury Court was part of a suite of specialty court shows that MGM Television offered; it was preceded by Lauren Lake's Paternity Court (focusing on paternity testing) and Couples Court with the Cutlers (which resolves relationship disputes), all of which were axed by MGM in the wake of the COVID-19 pandemic and related financial problems.
