= Bub Carrington =

American basketball player (born 2005)

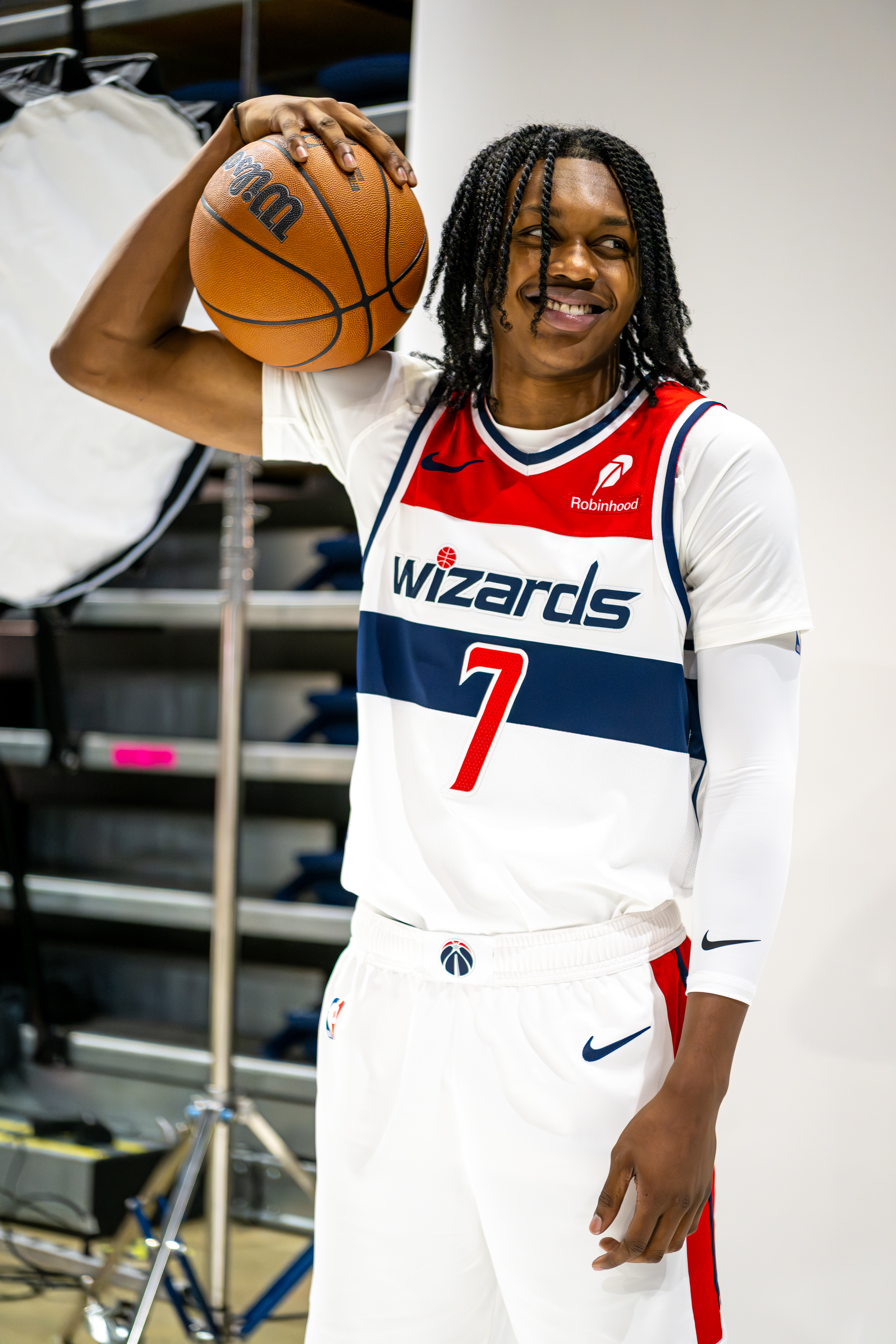
- Carrington with the Washington Wizards in 2025

No. 7 – Washington Wizards
- Position: Point guard / shooting guard
- League: NBA

Personal information
- Born: July 21, 2005 (age 21) Baltimore, Maryland, U.S.
- Listed height: 6 ft 4 in (1.93 m)
- Listed weight: 190 lb (86 kg)

Career information
- High school: Saint Frances (Baltimore, Maryland)
- College: Pittsburgh (2023–2024)
- NBA draft: 2024: 1st round, 14th overall pick
- Drafted by: Portland Trail Blazers
- Playing career: 2024–present

Career history
- 2024–present: Washington Wizards

Career highlights
- NBA All-Rookie Second Team (2025); ACC All-Rookie team (2024)
- Stats at NBA.com
- Stats at Basketball Reference

Carlton Kaleel "Bub" Carrington III (born July 21, 2005) is an American professional basketball player for the Washington Wizards of the National Basketball Association (NBA). He played college basketball for the Pittsburgh Panthers and was selected by the Portland Trail Blazers in the first round of the 2024 NBA draft before being traded to the Wizards during the draft.

== Early life ==
Carrington was born on July 21, 2005, in Baltimore, Maryland. The third in his family with the same name was nicknamed "lil' bub" after his basketball coach father's nickname, later shortened to just "bub." He attended Saint Frances Academy in Baltimore, where he played basketball, baseball and football. He was also part of the chess club. He scored over 2,000 points in his high school career, and after his junior year, committed to playing college basketball for Pittsburgh, being ranked by 247Sports as a four-star recruit, the 99th-best recruit overall, and the third-best player from the state. He chose Pittsburgh over eight other offers.

Carrington was also a member of Team Melo in the Nike Elite Youth Basketball League travel circuit, being named the EYBL Breakout Player of the Session and second-team All-Session while helping the team reach a spot in the championships. As a senior at Saint Frances in 2022–23, Carrington helped the school have an overall record of 29–11 while going 11–3 in the Baltimore Catholic League (BCL); he was named first-team All-BCL and to the BCL All-Tournament team and averaged more than 26 points, seven rebounds, six assists and two steals per game. He also led Saint Frances to the Maryland Interscholastic Athletic Association (MIAA) tournament, which they won for the second time in his tenure, with Carrington being named to the All-Tournament team. He had shooting splits of .490/.380/.860 and set a Saint Frances record with more than 1,000 points scored. He was invited to the DTLR Classic, Jumpman Classic, R1A Classic, more than Basketball Game and to the MLK Classic, earning most valuable player honors in each while setting an MLK Classic record with 42 points scored. He was named a Capital All-Star, played at the 50th Annual Hoop Culture Capital Classic, and was All-Tournament at the City of Palms and Triple Threat Classics.

== College career ==
Carrington joined the Pittsburgh Panthers for the start of the 2023–24 season and became an immediate starter. He started in the exhibition opener against the University of Pittsburgh at Johnstown and the regular-season opener against North Carolina A&T. Against North Carolina A&T, he helped the Panthers win 100–52 while totaling 18 points, 12 rebounds and 10 assists for the first triple-double in a debut in school history and the second in Atlantic Coast Conference (ACC) history, also being the first overall to accomplish the feat at Pittsburgh since 1998. He was named the ACC Rookie of the Week and received the honor again the following week, being the first Pittsburgh player to earn selection back-to-back since 2007–08.

== Professional career ==
On June 26, 2024, Carrington was selected with the fourteenth overall pick by the Portland Trail Blazers in the 2024 NBA draft. He was later traded, along with Malcolm Brogdon, to the Washington Wizards for Deni Avdija. On July 7, he signed with the Wizards.

In his rookie season Carrington was one of only 11 NBA players who played in all 82 games. He finished the year posting averages of 9.8 points, 4.2 rebounds and 4.4 assists per game. In May 2025 he was named to the NBA All-Rookie Second Team.

In his second season Carrington likewise played in all 82 games, becoming the first player since Karl-Anthony Towns in 2016-17 to appear in every game in each of his first two seasons. He finished the year averaging 10.7 points, 3.4 rebounds, and 4.6 assists per game.

== Career statistics ==
Legend
GP	Games played	GS	Games started	MPG	Minutes per game
FG%	Field goal percentage	3P%	3-point field goal percentage	FT%	Free throw percentage
RPG	Rebounds per game	APG	Assists per game	SPG	Steals per game
BPG	Blocks per game	PPG	Points per game	**Bold**	Career high
*	Led the league

=== NBA ===
Year	Team	GP	GS	MPG	FG%	3P%	FT%	RPG	APG	SPG	BPG	PPG
2024–25	Washington	**82***	**57**	**30.0**	.401	.339	**.812**	**4.2**	4.4	**.7**	**.3**	9.8
2025–26	Washington	**82***	48	27.7	**.424**	**.408**	.730	3.4	**4.6**	.6	.2	**10.7**
Career		164	105	28.8	.412	.374	.765	3.8	4.5	.6	.2	10.3

=== College ===
Year	Team	GP	GS	MPG	FG%	3P%	FT%	RPG	APG	SPG	BPG	PPG
2023–24	Pittsburgh	33	33	33.2	.412	.322	.785	5.2	4.1	.6	.2	13.8

== Personal life ==
Carrington is the son of Carlton 'Bub' Carrington (died 2025) and Karima Carrington. He has two siblings, Kareem and Faith. Carrington is a second cousin of retired NBA player Rudy Gay.
