= Bilal Coulibaly =

French basketball player (born 2004)

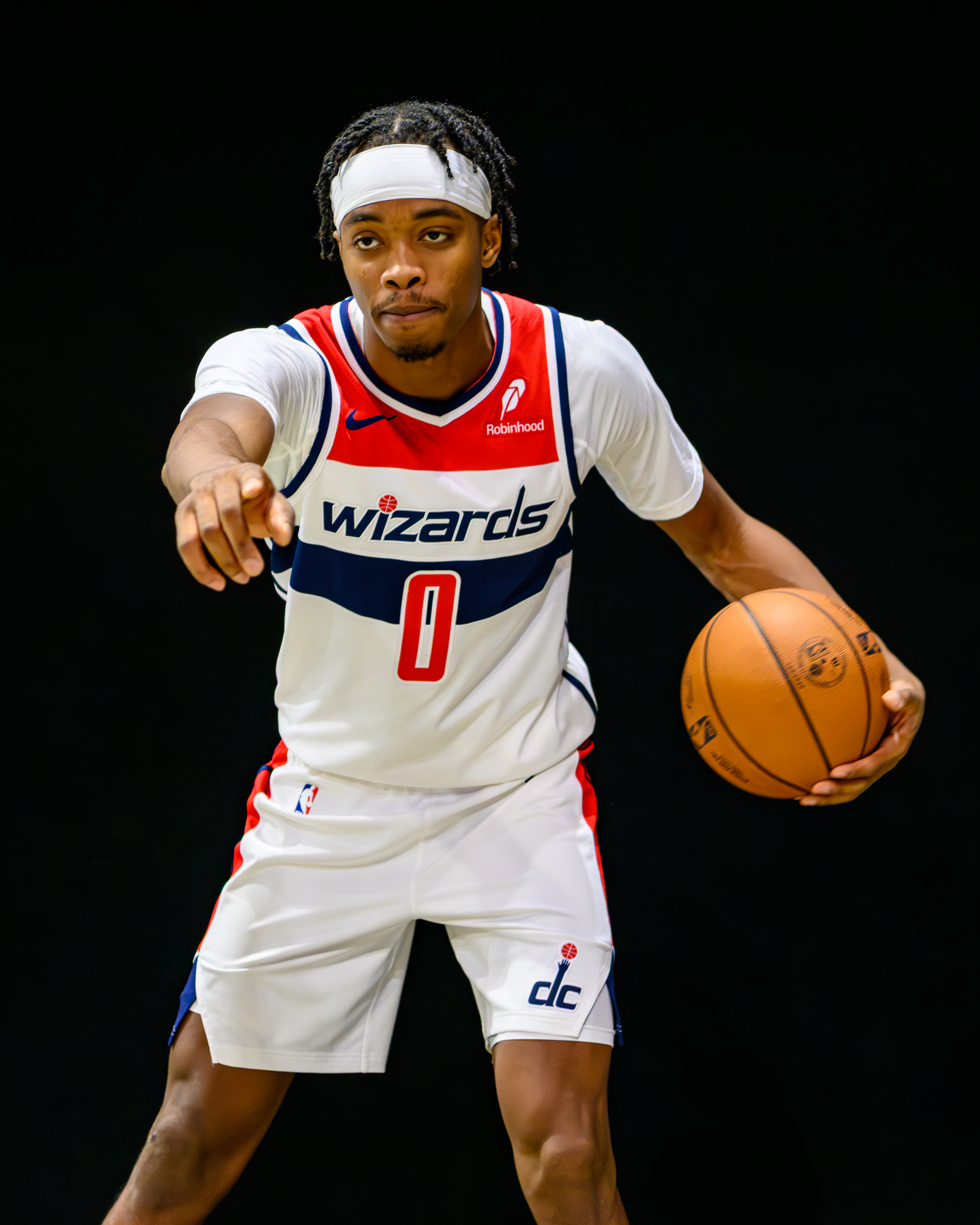
- Coulibaly with the Washington Wizards in 2025

No. 0 – Washington Wizards
- Position: Shooting guard
- League: NBA

Personal information
- Born: 26 July 2004 (age 22) Saint-Cloud, France
- Listed height: 6 ft 7 in (2.01 m)
- Listed weight: 195 lb (88 kg)

Career information
- NBA draft: 2023: 1st round, 7th overall pick
- Drafted by: Indiana Pacers
- Playing career: 2021–present

Career history
- 2021–2023: Metropolitans 92
- 2023–present: Washington Wizards
- Stats at NBA.com
- Stats at Basketball Reference

Bilal Coulibaly (/biˈlɑːl ˌkuːlɪˈbɑːli/ bee-LAHL KOO-lih-BAH-lee; French: [bilal kulibali]; born 26 July 2004) is a French professional basketball player for the Washington Wizards of the National Basketball Association (NBA). He played for the Metropolitans 92 of LNB Pro A prior to being selected seventh overall by the Indiana Pacers in the 2023 NBA draft. Coulibaly has also played for the French national team, winning silver at the 2024 Summer Olympics.

== Early life ==
Coulibaly was born on 26 July 2004 in Saint-Cloud, France, a commune of Paris. He grew up in nearby Courbevoie and began playing basketball for Courbevoie Sport Basket at age eight. He began playing for the youth team of Levallois Sporting Club Basket in 2017. He is of Malian descent.

== Professional career ==
=== Metropolitans 92 (2021–2023) ===
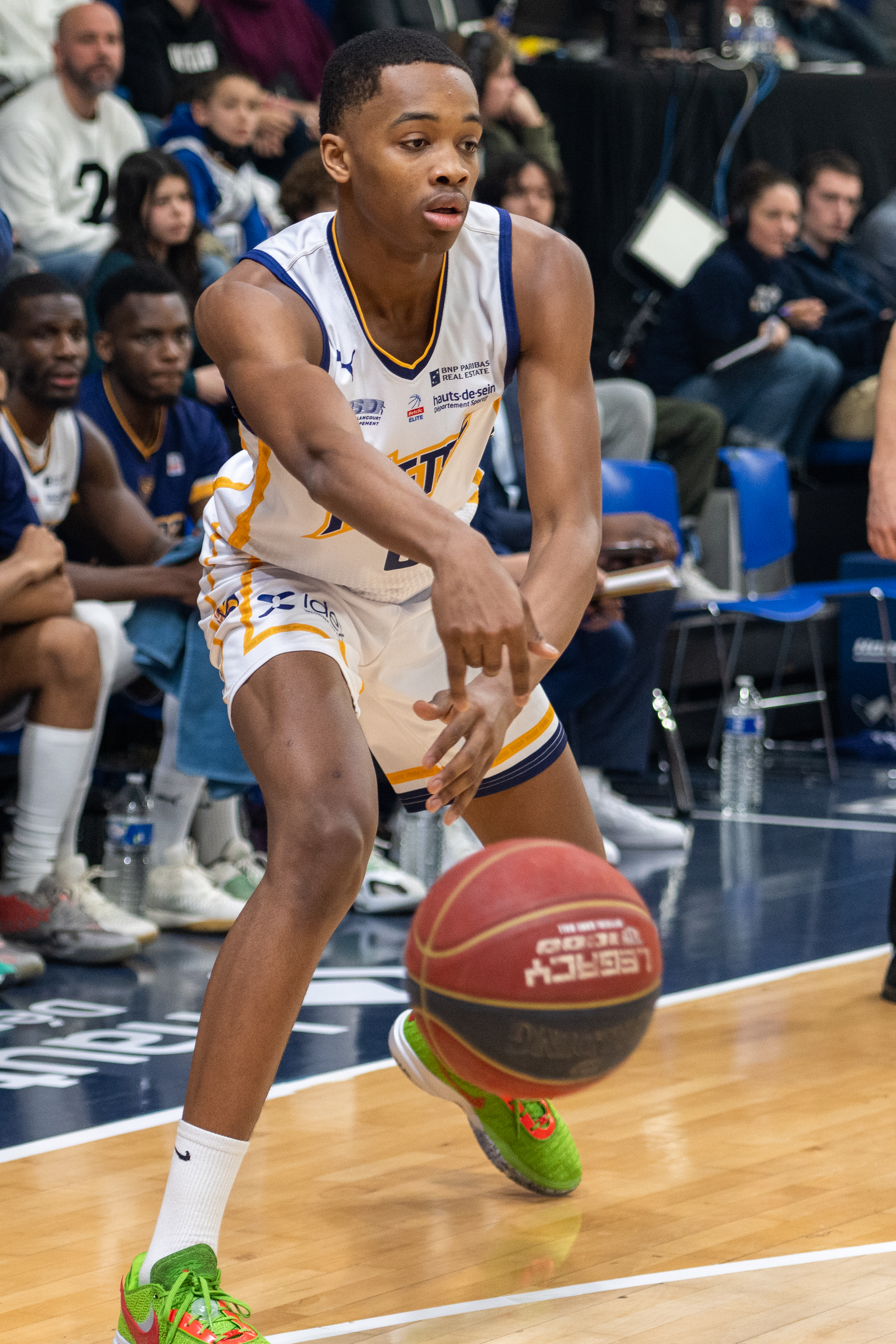
Coulibaly with Metropolitans 92 in 2023

Coulibaly began playing professionally for Metropolitans 92 in LNB Espoirs, the French under-21 league, in 2021. He began the 2022–23 season playing for the Metropolitans 92 under-21 team. He was promoted to the senior team after averaging 21.9 points, 2.6 steals, and 1.2 blocks per game in the LNB Espoirs competition. He played alongside future NBA Rookie of the Year Victor Wembanyama.

=== Washington Wizards (2023–present) ===
==== 2023–2024: Rookie Year ====
The Indiana Pacers selected Coulibaly with the seventh overall pick in the 2023 NBA draft and traded his rights to the Washington Wizards for two future second-round picks and the draft rights to Jarace Walker. On 2 July 2023, he signed with the Wizards. He joined Washington during the 2023 NBA Summer League and ended the four games averaging 12.3 points per game and 4.8 rebounds per game. Coulibaly made his NBA debut in the Wizards' season opener on 25 October, and recorded three points, four rebounds, three assists, and three blocks in 23 minutes played in a 143–120 loss to the Indiana Pacers. Shortly after, on 30 October, in a game against the Boston Celtics, Coulibaly would become the youngest player in Wizards franchise history to start a game at just 19 years and 96 days. Coulibaly recorded his first double-double with Washington in a 8 December game against the Brooklyn Nets, where he scored 11 points and grabbed 10 rebounds.

On 18 March 2024, the Wizards announced that Coulibaly would miss the remainder of the 2023–24 season with a right wrist fracture that he suffered in a game against the Chicago Bulls. In his rookie season, Coulibaly played in 63 games (starting 15) and averaged 8.4 points, 4.1 rebounds, and 1.7 assists.

==== 2024–2025 ====
Coulibaly started 59 contests for the Wizards during the 2024–25 NBA season, averaging 12.3 points, five rebounds, and 3.4 assists. In March 2025, he suffered a right hamstring strain that forced him to miss the rest of the season.

==== 2025–2026 ====
On 12 September 2025, it was announced that Coulibaly had undergone surgery to repair a torn ligament in his right thumb.

== National team career ==
Coulibaly played for the France national under-18 team in the 2022 FIBA U18 European Championship. He averaged 7.7 points, 3.9 rebounds, and one assist over seven games as France finished in fifth place. Coulibaly played with the national team at the 2024 Summer Olympics, earning a silver medal after losing to the United States in the finals.

== Career statistics ==
Legend
GP	Games played	GS	Games started	MPG	Minutes per game
FG%	Field goal percentage	3P%	3-point field goal percentage	FT%	Free throw percentage
RPG	Rebounds per game	APG	Assists per game	SPG	Steals per game
BPG	Blocks per game	PPG	Points per game	**Bold**	Career high

=== NBA ===
Year	Team	GP	GS	MPG	FG%	3P%	FT%	RPG	APG	SPG	BPG	PPG
2023–24	Washington	**63**	15	27.2	**.435**	**.346**	.702	4.1	1.7	.9	.8	8.4
2024–25	Washington	59	**59**	**33.0**	.421	.281	**.746**	**5.0**	**3.4**	**1.3**	.7	**12.3**
2025–26	Washington	56	56	26.2	.425	.319	**.746**	4.3	2.6	**1.3**	**1.0**	11.7
Career		178	130	28.8	.426	.313	.734	4.5	2.6	1.2	.8	10.8
