= Alex Sarr =

French basketball player (born 2005)

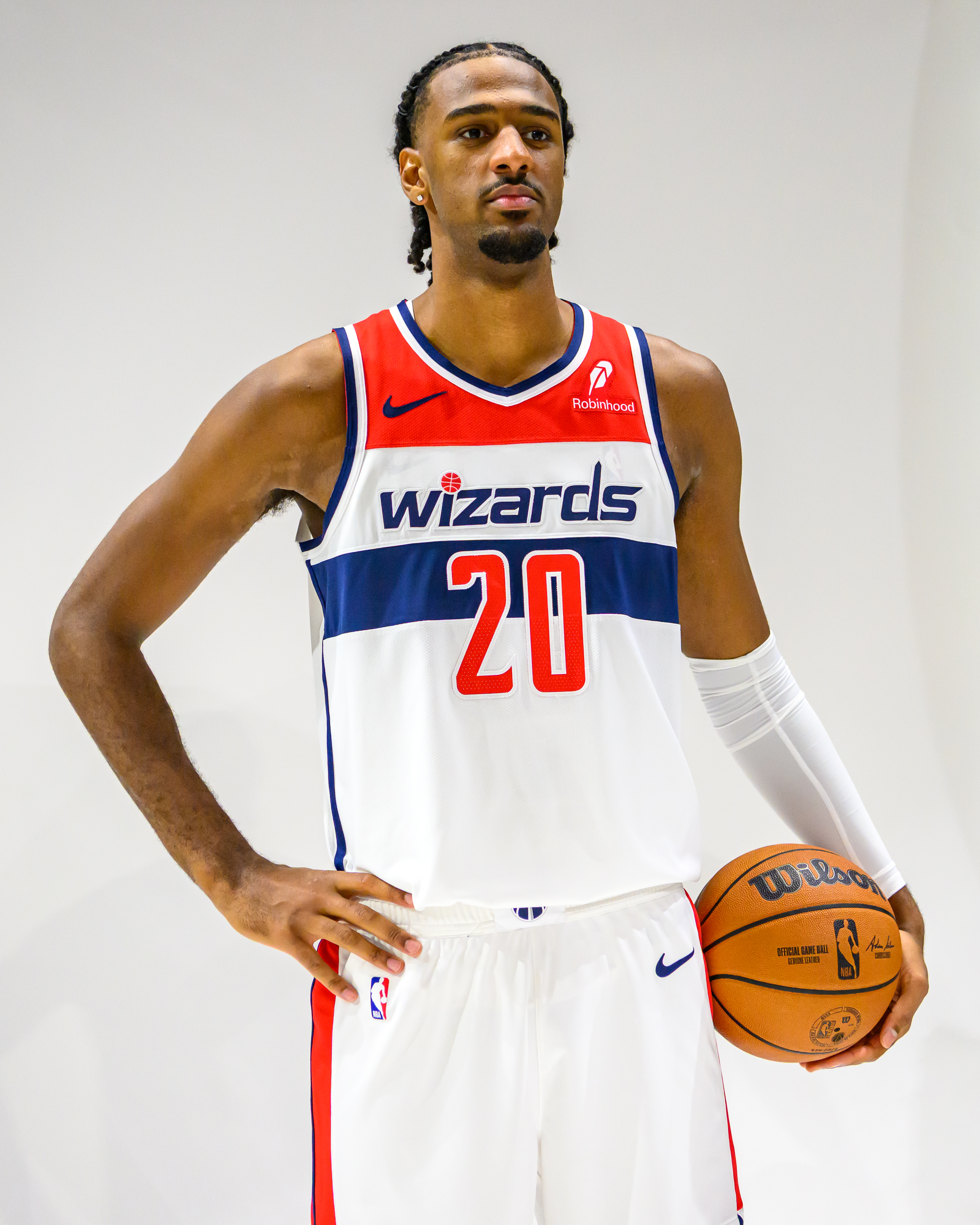
- Sarr with the Washington Wizards in 2025

No. 20 – Washington Wizards
- Position: Center
- League: NBA

Personal information
- Born: 26 April 2005 (age 21) Bordeaux, France
- Listed height: 7 ft 0 in (2.13 m)
- Listed weight: 205 lb (93 kg)

Career information
- NBA draft: 2024: 1st round, 2nd overall pick
- Drafted by: Washington Wizards
- Playing career: 2021–present

Career history
- 2021–2022: Team Overtime
- 2022–2023: YNG Dreamerz
- 2023–2024: Perth Wildcats
- 2024–present: Washington Wizards

Career highlights
- NBA All-Rookie First Team (2025); All-OTE Second Team (2023)
- Stats at NBA.com
- Stats at Basketball Reference
Medals
Men's basketball
Representing France
FIBA U19 World Cup
Silver medal – second place	2023 Hungary	Team
FIBA U17 World Cup
Bronze medal – third place	2022 Spain	Team

Alexandre Dam Sarr (/sɑːr/ SAR, French pronunciation: [alɛksɑ̃dʁ saʁ]; born 26 April 2005) is a French professional basketball player for the Washington Wizards of the National Basketball Association (NBA). Sarr played for the French youth national team and the Perth Wildcats of the Australian National Basketball League (NBL) prior to being selected second overall by the Wizards in the 2024 NBA draft. He is the younger brother of basketball player Olivier Sarr.

== Early life ==
Sarr was born on 26 April 2005 in Bordeaux, France. He grew up in a family of basketball players, initially in Bordeaux and then later Toulouse. He started playing basketball at the age of four. In 2019, Sarr joined the Spanish club Real Madrid Baloncesto and played two seasons for their youth team.

== Professional career ==
=== Overtime Elite (2021–2023) ===
In 2021, Sarr moved to the United States to join the newly established Overtime Elite league in Atlanta, securing him an alternative professional pathway with a guaranteed minimum salary of at least $100,000 per year. He played two seasons at Overtime Elite, the first with Team Overtime and the second with YNG Dreamerz. He earned second-team All-OTE honours in 2022–23.

=== Perth Wildcats (2023–2024) ===
On 9 May 2023, Sarr signed with the Perth Wildcats of the Australian National Basketball League (NBL), joining the team as part of the league's Next Stars program for the 2023–24 season. He entered the season as a highly touted draft prospect. On 28 December, he sustained a hip strain in a game against the Adelaide 36ers and subsequently missed the next four weeks. On 27 January 2024, he recorded a new career record, scoring 18 points and five blocks in a 103–91 win over the South East Melbourne Phoenix. He finished the season with averages of 9.4 points, 4.3 rebounds, 1.5 blocks and 0.9 assists in 17 minutes per game, helping Perth reach the NBL play-off semifinals.

=== Washington Wizards (2024–present) ===
Sarr declared for the 2024 NBA draft on 12 April 2024. On 26 June, he was selected second overall by the Washington Wizards. Sarr was picked alongside fellow Frenchmen Zaccharie Risacher (drafted first overall by the Atlanta Hawks) and Tidjane Salaün (drafted sixth by the Charlotte Hornets), making France the first foreign nation to have at least three players picked in the top 10 spots of any NBA draft. On 6 July, he signed his rookie contract with the Wizards.

Sarr averaged 5.5 points and 7.8 rebounds in four Summer League games and had two points, five rebounds, one assist, and two blocks in his NBA debut on 24 October. He was named December's Eastern Conference Rookie of the Month. On 15 March 2025, he recorded a career-high 34 points, six rebounds and five assists in a 126–123 win over the Denver Nuggets, becoming the youngest player in Wizards' history with a 30-plus-point game. He was named to the NBA All-Rookie First Team and finished fourth in overall Rookie of the Year voting, behind winner Stephon Castle, Zaccharie Risacher, and Jaylen Wells.

Sarr made 48 starts for Washington during the 2025–26 NBA season, recording averages of 16.3 points, 7.4 rebounds, and 2.7 assists. On 15 June 2026, Sarr underwent surgery to repair a fractured right foot incurred in an offseason workout. He was expected to be ready for the beginning of the 2026-27 season.

== National team career ==
In 2021, Sarr debuted for the French junior national team and helped them win the FIBA U16 European Challengers. He helped France earn bronze at the 2022 FIBA U17 World Cup and silver at the 2023 FIBA U19 World Cup.

Sarr joined the France senior team ahead of the EuroBasket 2025. On 5 August 2025, he made his national team debut when he scored 20 points on 7-from-10 shooting to lead France to a 81–75 win over Montenegro. Sarr played in the first group phase game, but suffered an ankle injury against Slovenia, which led him to miss the rest of the tournament.

== Career statistics ==
Legend
GP	Games played	GS	Games started	MPG	Minutes per game
FG%	Field goal percentage	3P%	3-point field goal percentage	FT%	Free throw percentage
RPG	Rebounds per game	APG	Assists per game	SPG	Steals per game
BPG	Blocks per game	PPG	Points per game	**Bold**	Career high

=== NBA ===
Year	Team	GP	GS	MPG	FG%	3P%	FT%	RPG	APG	SPG	BPG	PPG
2024–25	Washington	**67**	**67**	27.1	.394	.308	.679	6.5	2.4	.7	1.5	13.0
2025–26	Washington	48	48	**27.2**	**.482**	**.333**	**.692**	**7.4**	**2.7**	**.8**	**2.0**	**16.3**
Career		115	115	27.1	.433	.316	.685	6.9	2.5	.7	1.7	14.4

=== NBL ===
Year	Team	GP	GS	MPG	FG%	3P%	FT%	RPG	APG	SPG	BPG	PPG
2023–24	Perth	27	0	17.3	.516	.286	.710	4.3	.9	.4	1.5	9.4

== Personal life ==
Sarr is of Senegalese descent. His father Massar is a former professional basketball player from Senegal, while his older brother Olivier plays for Real Madrid.
