= 2023–24 Washington Wizards season =

Season of National Basketball Association team the Washington Wizards

- Head coach: Wes Unseld Jr. (fired); Brian Keefe (interim)
- President: Michael Winger
- General manager: Will Dawkins
- Owner: Ted Leonsis
- Arena: Capital One Arena

Results
- Record: 15–67 (.183)
- Place: Division: 5th (Southeast); Conference: 14th (Eastern)
- Playoff finish: Did not qualify
- Stats at Basketball Reference

Local media
- Television: Monumental Sports Network
- Radio: Federal News Radio; 106.7 The Fan

The 2023–24 Washington Wizards season was the 63rd season of the franchise in the National Basketball Association (NBA) and 50th in the Washington, D.C. area. This is the first season since 2011–12, where the team entered the season without Bradley Beal, who was traded to the Phoenix Suns during the off-season. The Wizards became the fifteenth team in NBA history to record a winless month, going 0–12 in February. They finished with a franchise worst 15–67 record.

The Washington Wizards drew an average home attendance of 16,898 in 41 home games in the 2023-24 NBA season.

== Background ==
The previous season ended in disappointing fashion, with the Wizards falling all the way to 12th in the Eastern Conference and missing the playoffs entirely. General Manager Tommy Sheppard was unceremoniously fired after the end of the season. After about a month of searching, team owner Ted Leonsis decided to appoint former LA Clippers executive Michael Winger as the President of Monumental Basketball, Leonsis' organization that oversees all pro basketball teams in the Washington, DC area including the Wizards, the Capital City Go-Go, and the Washington Mystics. Winger then brought in Will Dawkins act as the new Wizards' GM and Travis Schlenk as the Senior VP of Player Personnel, and promoted John Thompson III as Senior VP of Monumental Basketball.

At first, the team appeared ready to try building around their "Big 3" of Bradley Beal, Kristaps Porziņģis, and Kyle Kuzma. However, the new Front Office decided to tear down and rebuild the roster shortly after getting settled in. Beal was traded to the Phoenix Suns, as one of the few destinations that would both make the space to take him and where Beal was willing to waive the No Trade Clause attached to his contract. The Wizards would receive Chris Paul, Landry Shamet, and a large list of future draft pick considerations in both rounds until 2030. Porziņģis was moved in a sign-and-trade deal to the Boston Celtics as part of a three-team trade with the Memphis Grizzlies that would net the Wizards Tyus Jones, Danilo Gallinari, and Mike Muscala. Kuzma declined to pick up his Player Option, instead opting for the Free Agent market. However, Kuzma would later be lured back to Washington with a 4-year contract worth about $90 Million.

On Draft Night, the Wizards made their proposed trades (above) official, but roped in the Indiana Pacers with their Phoenix trade to move up to the #7 draft spot and take the young Frenchman, Bilal Coulibaly. The Wizards also flipped Chris Paul to the Golden State Warriors, along with their 57th pick in the night's draft (which would be used on Trayce Jackson-Davis), to acquire Jordan Poole, Ryan Rollins, and Patrick Baldwin Jr. on top of a couple of future draft picks and cash considerations. The Wizards later traded Monté Morris to the Detroit Pistons and would later waive Xavier Cooks and Taj Gibson to be under the maximum player limit before the season started.

=== October ===
The Wizards opened their season in Indiana with a brutal loss to the Pacers, 143-120. However, they would bounce back the very next game. With their home opener in DC against Memphis, the Wizards won 113-106 in a match where they led by 25 points in the third quarter. The Wizards would finish the month with a 1–2 record.

=== November ===
The Wizards went into free-fall during this month, losing every game except for two against opponents who were close to them in the standings: the Charlotte Hornets and the Detroit Pistons, with a 9-game losing streak between those two wins. Between a lack of rebounding, a porous defense, and no true Center on the team (except Daniel Gafford) able to guard against taller opponents, the team had few paths to victory. The team would either let leads slip away late in close losses, or play the end of their bench earlier in games than usual, to give them some playing time during blowouts. The month ended with the Wizards at 2–13 record for the month, 3–15 overall, fighting with the Pistons and San Antonio Spurs for the ignoble honor of holding worst record in the entire NBA for the season.

=== December ===
The Wizards continued their losing streak from the end of November, losing close games to the Magic and 76ers despite holding leads midway through the game, followed by blowouts from the Nets and 76ers where they were dominated through the entire game, including a 45-point loss against the 76ers on December 11. Jules Bernard was signed to a two-way contract from the Go-Go, and John Butler Jr. was waived in a corresponding move. Bernard picked up his first points as an NBA player in the latter match. On December 13, team owner Ted Leonsis announced that he planned to move the team across the Potomac River, to Alexandria, VA, and take advantage of an offer from Governor Glenn Youngkin to build his own new stadium and surrounding development in a deal worth up to $2 Billion, including at least $650 Million in public funding.

By the end of the month, the Wizards had doubled their win total on the season, going 3–11 on the month and 6–26 for the season.

=== January ===
The month of January saw the Wizards woes continue. The team waived Ryan Rollins on January 8, and three days later he was charged with multiple counts of petit larceny, accused of stealing multiple items from a Target store in Alexandria, VA, worth less than $1,000. Winger would not confirm if the charges were the reason that Rollins was waived. The team made other roster moves this month, signing Hamidou Diallo to a 10-Day Contract on January 9. On January 14, the team traded with the Pistons again, sending Danilo Gallinari and Mike Muscala to Detroit, in exchange for Marvin Bagley III, Isaiah Livers, and two future second-round draft picks. Bagley was soon integrated into the Wizards' rotation, but Livers never saw the floor for the team, recovering from inflammation in his right hip since the day he was traded until the Wizards made an official announcement to declare him out for the rest of the season in the following month.

On the court, the Wizards were even worse, with two 6-game losing streaks split in the middle by a win against the Atlanta Hawks on January 13. On January 25, Wes Unseld Jr. was relieved of his coaching duties and transferred to a front office position. Brian Keefe was promoted to interim Head Coach for the remainder of the season. During the first games under his reign, the Wizards achieved their first winning streak of the season, winning two games back-to-back in Detroit and San Antonio, on January 27 and 29, respectively, scoring exactly 118 points in both. By the end of the month, the Wizards went 3–12, with all three wins coming on the road, and had a 9–38 record for the season.

=== February ===
As the trade deadline approached, Winger continued to hold out for a willing partner that would give the Wizards a first-round pick for any players on the trading block. On February 8th, Winger got his wish, trading their starting Center, Daniel Gafford, to the Dallas Mavericks in exchange for Richaun Holmes and Dallas' first-round pick in the 2024 NBA draft. On the 16th, the team waived Delon Wright. On the 22nd, the team would give a 10-Day Contract to Justin Champagnie.

This month saw the Wizards hit their nadir on the court, winning zero games, and on a 13-game losing streak since their loss against the Clippers on January 31. The only Wizards representative at the 2024 NBA All-Star Game in the middle of the month was Coulibaly, who appeared in the Rising Stars Challenge, as a member of Team Pau. The team would finish 0–12 for the month and with a 9–50 record on the season.

=== March ===
With the Wizards mathematically eliminated from playoff contention this month, the front office made a few more moves looking to the future. The team converted the contracts of Eugene Omoruyi and Justin Champagnie to 2-year deals, with Omoruyi getting a spot on the main roster and Champagnie getting a Two-Way Contract. On March 14, second-round draft pick Tristan Vukčević, who spent most of the year playing with Partizan Belgrade in Serbia, was also brought to DC and signed to a two-year deal with the Wizards. Meanwhile, Leonsis and Youngkin's plans to build a new stadium and real estate development in Alexandria fell through when the local and state governments refused to allow public tax dollars to fund the project. Leonsis decided to return to Mayor Muriel Bowser of Washington, DC, and quickly took her proposed deal to keep the Wizards home in the District.

The Wizards managed to win more games this month than any other in the season, including their first home victory since a December 29th match against the Nets. Even though they were eliminated from the playoffs, the team finished 5-11 for the month and had a 14-61 record for the season.

== Draft picks ==
Round	Pick	Player	Position	Nationality	College
1	8	Jarace Walker	PF/SF	United States	Houston (Fr.)
2	42	Tristan Vukčević	PF/C	Serbia	Partizan Belgrade (Serbia)
2	57	Trayce Jackson-Davis	PF/C	United States	Indiana (Sr.)

The Wizards entered the 2023 NBA Draft holding one first-round pick and two second round picks, the latter of which were acquired through previous trades. After a series of moves on draft night, the Wizards swapped first-round spots with the Indiana Pacers to gain the rights to French forward Bilal Coulibaly with the 7th overall pick, sending Jarace Walker to the Pacers and a couple of future second-round picks. The team would use their #42 overall pick on the young Serbian player Tristan Vukčević. Later, the rights to Trayce Jackson-Davis (Pick #57 overall) were folded into a larger trade with the Golden State Warriors in exchange for cash considerations and Patrick Baldwin Jr.

== Roster ==
2023–24 Washington Wizards roster
Players

Pos.	No.	Player	Height	Weight	DOB	From
F	8	Deni Avdija	6 ft 9 in (2.06 m)	210 lb (95 kg)	2001-01-03	Israel
F/C	35	Marvin III Bagley	6 ft 10 in (2.08 m)	235 lb (107 kg)	1999-03-14	Duke
F	7	Patrick Jr. Baldwin	6 ft 9 in (2.06 m)	215 lb (98 kg)	2002-11-18	Milwaukee
G	14	Jules Bernard (TW)	6 ft 7 in (2.01 m)	210 lb (95 kg)	2000-01-21	UCLA
G	4	Jared Butler	6 ft 3 in (1.91 m)	193 lb (88 kg)	2000-08-25	Baylor
G/F	9	Justin Champagnie (TW)	6 ft 6 in (1.98 m)	206 lb (93 kg)	2001-06-29	Pittsburgh
F	0	Bilal Coulibaly	6 ft 6 in (1.98 m)	195 lb (88 kg)	2004-07-26	France
G/F	1	Johnny Davis	6 ft 4 in (1.93 m)	195 lb (88 kg)	2002-02-27	Wisconsin
F	16	Anthony Gill	6 ft 8 in (2.03 m)	230 lb (104 kg)	1992-10-17	Virginia
F/C	22	Richaun Holmes	6 ft 9 in (2.06 m)	235 lb (107 kg)	1993-10-15	Bowling Green
G	5	Tyus Jones	6 ft 2 in (1.88 m)	196 lb (89 kg)	1996-05-10	Duke
F	24	Corey Kispert	6 ft 6 in (1.98 m)	224 lb (102 kg)	1999-03-03	Gonzaga
F	33	Kyle Kuzma	6 ft 9 in (2.06 m)	221 lb (100 kg)	1995-07-24	Utah
F	97	Eugene Omoruyi	6 ft 6 in (1.98 m)	235 lb (107 kg)	1997-02-14	Oregon
G	13	Jordan Poole	6 ft 4 in (1.93 m)	194 lb (88 kg)	1999-06-19	Michigan
G	20	Landry Shamet	6 ft 4 in (1.93 m)	190 lb (86 kg)	1997-03-13	Wichita State
F/C	00	Tristan Vukčević	6 ft 10 in (2.08 m)	220 lb (100 kg)	2003-03-11	Serbia

Coaches
Head coach
- Brian Keefe (interim)
Assistant(s)
- Joseph Blair
- Zach Guthrie
- Mike Miller
- James Posey
- David Vanterpool
- Sammy Gelfand

Legend
- (DP) Unsigned draft pick
- (FA) Free agent
- (S) Suspended
- (GL) On assignment to G League
- (TW) Two-way affiliate player
- Injured

Roster
Updated: April 5, 2024

== Standings ==
=== Division ===
Southeast Division	W	L	PCT	GB	Home	Road	Div	GP
y – Orlando Magic	47	35	.573	–	29‍–‍12	18‍–‍23	9‍–‍7	82
x – Miami Heat	46	36	.561	1.0	22‍–‍19	24‍–‍17	13‍–‍3	82
pi – Atlanta Hawks	36	46	.439	11.0	21‍–‍20	15‍–‍26	8‍–‍8	82
Charlotte Hornets	21	61	.256	26.0	11‍–‍30	10‍–‍31	6‍–‍10	82
Washington Wizards	15	67	.183	32.0	7‍–‍34	8‍–‍33	4‍–‍12	82

=== Conference ===
Eastern Conference
#	Team	W	L	PCT	GB	GP
1	z – Boston Celtics *	64	18	.780	–	82
2	x – New York Knicks	50	32	.610	14.0	82
3	y – Milwaukee Bucks *	49	33	.598	15.0	82
4	x – Cleveland Cavaliers	48	34	.585	16.0	82
5	y – Orlando Magic *	47	35	.573	17.0	82
6	x – Indiana Pacers	47	35	.573	17.0	82
7	x – Philadelphia 76ers	47	35	.573	17.0	82
8	x – Miami Heat	46	36	.561	18.0	82
9	pi – Chicago Bulls	39	43	.476	25.0	82
10	pi – Atlanta Hawks	36	46	.439	28.0	82
11	Brooklyn Nets	32	50	.390	32.0	82
12	Toronto Raptors	25	57	.305	39.0	82
13	Charlotte Hornets	21	61	.256	43.0	82
14	Washington Wizards	15	67	.183	49.0	82
15	Detroit Pistons	14	68	.171	50.0	82

== Game log ==
=== Preseason ===
2023 preseason game log
Total: 3–1 (Home: 2–0; Road: 1–1)
Preseason: 3–1 (home: 2–0; road: 1–1)

Game	Date	Team	Score	High points	High rebounds	High assists	Location Attendance	Record
1	October 10	Cairns	W 145–82	Kyle Kuzma (22)	Daniel Gafford (8)	Delon Wright (6)	Capital One Arena; 6,856	1–0
2	October 12	Charlotte	W 98–92	Kyle Kuzma (19)	Tyus Jones (7)	Davis, Kispert, Kuzma, Muscala, Poole, Wright (3)	Capital One Arena; 7,297	2–0
3	October 18	@ New York	W 131–106	Jordan Poole (41)	Mike Muscala (8)	Tyus Jones (7)	Madison Square Garden; 18,881	3–0
4	October 20	@ Toronto	L 98–134	Deni Avdija (18)	Deni Avdija (7)	Jordan Poole (4)	Scotiabank Arena; 18,426	3–1

2023–24 preseason schedule

=== Regular season ===
This became the first regular season where all the NBA teams competed in a mid-season tournament setting due to the implementation of the 2023 NBA In-Season Tournament.

2023–24 game log
Total: 15–67 (Home: 7–34; Road: 8–33)
October: 1–2 (home: 1–1; road: 0–1)

Game	Date	Team	Score	High points	High rebounds	High assists	Location Attendance	Record
1	October 25	@ Indiana	L 120–143	Kyle Kuzma (25)	Deni Avdija (7)	Jones, Wright (6)	Gainbridge Fieldhouse; 16,004	0–1
2	October 28	Memphis	W 113–106	Jordan Poole (27)	Kyle Kuzma (13)	Jones, Wright (7)	Capital One Arena; 16,191	1–1
3	October 30	Boston	L 107–126	Kyle Kuzma (21)	Deni Avdija (7)	Tyus Jones (7)	Capital One Arena; 17,898	1–2

November: 2–13 (home: 0–5; road: 2–8)

Game	Date	Team	Score	High points	High rebounds	High assists	Location Attendance	Record
4	November 1	@ Atlanta	L 121–130	Kyle Kuzma (25)	Kyle Kuzma (9)	Delon Wright (9)	State Farm Arena; 15,925	1–3
5	November 3	@ Miami	L 114–121	Kyle Kuzma (22)	Daniel Gafford (5)	Jordan Poole (6)	Kaseya Center; 19,660	1–4
6	November 6	@ Philadelphia	L 128–146	Kyle Kuzma (28)	Daniel Gafford (7)	Avdija, Jones, Poole (6)	Wells Fargo Center; 19,765	1–5
7	November 8	@ Charlotte	W 132–116	Kyle Kuzma (33)	Kyle Kuzma (9)	Deni Avdija (5)	Spectrum Center; 14,267	2–5
8	November 10	Charlotte	L 117–124	Kyle Kuzma (17)	Daniel Gafford (9)	Poole, Wright (6)	Capital One Arena; 17,602	2–6
9	November 12	@ Brooklyn	L 94–102	Bilal Coulibaly (20)	Deni Avdija (9)	Corey Kispert (4)	Barclays Center; 17,732	2–7
10	November 13	@ Toronto	L 107–111	Kyle Kuzma (34)	Daniel Gafford (9)	Tyus Jones (8)	Scotiabank Arena; 19,800	2–8
11	November 15	Dallas	L 117–130	Kyle Kuzma (22)	Daniel Gafford (9)	Avdija, Kispert (4)	Capital One Arena; 16,632	2–9
12	November 17	New York	L 99–120	Kyle Kuzma (19)	Daniel Gafford (7)	Jones, Kuzma (5)	Capital One Arena; 16,886	2–10
13	November 20	Milwaukee	L 129–142	Jordan Poole (30)	Daniel Gafford (5)	Kyle Kuzma (13)	Capital One Arena; 17,746	2–11
14	November 22	@ Charlotte	L 114–117	Kyle Kuzma (28)	Daniel Gafford (16)	Kyle Kuzma (10)	Spectrum Center; 16,432	2–12
15	November 24	@ Milwaukee	L 128–131	Jordan Poole (26)	Daniel Gafford (9)	Jones, Poole (7)	Fiserv Forum; 17,880	2–13
16	November 25	Atlanta	L 108–136	Jared Butler (13)	Kyle Kuzma (7)	Kyle Kuzma (8)	Capital One Arena; 16,276	2–14
17	November 27	@ Detroit	W 126–107	Kyle Kuzma (32)	Kyle Kuzma (12)	Kyle Kuzma (8)	Little Caesars Arena; 14,346	3–14
18	November 29	@ Orlando	L 120–139	Kyle Kuzma (23)	Coulibaly, Poole (5)	Kyle Kuzma (6)	Amway Center; 17,109	3–15

December: 3–11 (home: 2–5; road: 1–6)

Game	Date	Team	Score	High points	High rebounds	High assists	Location Attendance	Record
19	December 1	@ Orlando	L 125–130	Kyle Kuzma (27)	Daniel Gafford (11)	Tyus Jones (6)	Amway Center; 18,846	3–16
20	December 6	Philadelphia	L 126–131	Jordan Poole (23)	Deni Avdija (8)	Avdija, Jones (8)	Capital One Arena; 15,568	3–17
21	December 8	@ Brooklyn	L 97–124	Kyle Kuzma (17)	Bilal Coulibaly (10)	Deni Avdija (4)	Barclays Center; 16,587	3–18
22	December 11	@ Philadelphia	L 101–146	Kyle Kuzma (21)	Kyle Kuzma (9)	Butler, Coulibaly (4)	Wells Fargo Center; 19,762	3–19
23	December 13	New Orleans	L 122–142	Kyle Kuzma (27)	Kyle Kuzma (7)	Deni Avdija (7)	Capital One Arena; 14,080	3–20
24	December 15	Indiana	W 137–123	Kyle Kuzma (31)	Gafford, Jones (10)	Tyus Jones (11)	Capital One Arena; 15,208	4–20
25	December 17	@ Phoenix	L 108–112	Daniel Gafford (26)	Daniel Gafford (17)	Tyus Jones (11)	Footprint Center; 17,071	4–21
26	December 18	@ Sacramento	L 131–143	Jordan Poole (28)	Kyle Kuzma (8)	Tyus Jones (9)	Golden 1 Center; 17,794	4–22
27	December 21	@ Portland	W 118–117	Kyle Kuzma (32)	Deni Avdija (11)	three players (6)	Moda Center; 18,690	5–22
28	December 22	@ Golden State	L 118–129	Jordan Poole (25)	Kyle Kuzma (9)	Tyus Jones (6)	Chase Center; 18,064	5–23
29	December 26	Orlando	L 119–127	Jordan Poole (30)	Daniel Gafford (13)	Jones, Kuzma (6)	Capital One Arena; 16,293	5–24
30	December 27	Toronto	L 102–132	Poole, Kuzma (14)	Daniel Gafford (8)	Kyle Kuzma (7)	Capital One Arena; 15,437	5–25
31	December 29	Brooklyn	W 110–104	Kyle Kuzma (26)	Deni Avdija (13)	Avdija, Jones (6)	Capital One Arena; 16,825	6–25
32	December 31	Atlanta	L 126–130	Kyle Kuzma (38)	Deni Avdija (12)	Tyus Jones (8)	Capital One Arena; 17,042	6–26

January: 3–12 (home: 0–8; road: 3–4)

Game	Date	Team	Score	High points	High rebounds	High assists	Location Attendance	Record
33	January 3	@ Cleveland	L 101–140	Kyle Kuzma (16)	Deni Avdija (6)	Avdija, Wright (4)	Rocket Mortgage FieldHouse; 19,432	6–27
34	January 5	@ Cleveland	L 90–114	Tyus Jones (16)	Bilal Coulibaly (7)	Tyus Jones (5)	Rocket Mortgage FieldHouse; 19,432	6–28
35	January 6	New York	L 105–121	Kyle Kuzma (27)	Daniel Gafford (12)	Tyus Jones (8)	Capital One Arena; 20,333	6–29
36	January 8	Oklahoma City	L 128–136	Jordan Poole (24)	Kyle Kuzma (15)	Tyus Jones (9)	Capital One Arena; 15,297	6–30
37	January 10	@ Indiana	L 104–112	Jordan Poole (28)	Kyle Kuzma (11)	Jordan Poole (7)	Gainbridge Fieldhouse; 15,721	6–31
38	January 13	@ Atlanta	W 127–99	Kyle Kuzma (29)	Deni Avdija (14)	Deni Avdija (9)	State Farm Arena; 17,108	7–31
39	January 15	Detroit	L 117–129	Tyus Jones (22)	Kyle Kuzma (8)	Tyus Jones (7)	Capital One Arena; 15,156	7–32
40	January 18	@ New York	L 109–113	Jordan Poole (24)	Marvin Bagley III (11)	Tyus Jones (15)	Madison Square Garden; 19,466	7–33
41	January 20	San Antonio	L 127–131	Marvin Bagley III (21)	Bagley III, Kuzma (12)	Jones, Kuzma (6)	Capital One Arena; 17,922	7–34
42	January 21	Denver	L 104–113	Kyle Kuzma (17)	Deni Avdija (8)	Tyus Jones (13)	Capital One Arena; 17,107	7–35
43	January 24	Minnesota	L 107–118	Deni Avdija (24)	Marvin Bagley III (15)	Kyle Kuzma (8)	Capital One Arena; 15,446	7–36
44	January 25	Utah	L 108–123	Kyle Kuzma (26)	Daniel Gafford (9)	Tyus Jones (14)	Capital One Arena; 14,027	7–37
45	January 27	@ Detroit	W 118–104	Kyle Kuzma (30)	Daniel Gafford (13)	Tyus Jones (9)	Little Caesars Arena; 16,922	8–37
46	January 29	@ San Antonio	W 118–113	Kyle Kuzma (18)	Daniel Gafford (13)	Tyus Jones (9)	Frost Bank Center; 17,020	9–37
47	January 31	L.A. Clippers	L 109–125	Kyle Kuzma (27)	Bagley III, Gafford (8)	Tyus Jones (7)	Capital One Arena; 17,201	9–38

February: 0–12 (home: 0–6; road: 0–6)

Game	Date	Team	Score	High points	High rebounds	High assists	Location Attendance	Record
48	February 2	Miami	L 102–110	Corey Kispert (26)	Daniel Gafford (14)	Jordan Poole (10)	Capital One Arena; 18,308	9–39
49	February 4	Phoenix	L 112–140	Deni Avdija (24)	Eugene Omoruyi (10)	Tyus Jones (8)	Capital One Arena; 16,984	9–40
50	February 7	Cleveland	L 106–114	Kyle Kuzma (28)	Daniel Gafford (13)	Tyus Jones (8)	Capital One Arena; 15,860	9–41
51	February 9	@ Boston	L 129–133	Avdija, Kispert (24)	Deni Avdija (11)	Tyus Jones (9)	TD Garden; 19,156	9–42
52	February 10	Philadelphia	L 113–119	Tyus Jones (25)	Deni Avdija (13)	Tyus Jones (9)	Capital One Arena; 20,333	9–43
53	February 12	@ Dallas	L 104–112	Deni Avdija (25)	Marvin Bagley III (13)	Tyus Jones (16)	American Airlines Center; 19,921	9–44
54	February 14	@ New Orleans	L 126–133	Deni Avdija (43)	Deni Avdija (15)	Tyus Jones (15)	Smoothie King Center; 18,316	9–45
All-Star Game
55	February 22	@ Denver	L 110–130	Kyle Kuzma (31)	Kyle Kuzma (12)	Tyus Jones (14)	Ball Arena; 19,621	9–46
56	February 23	@ Oklahoma City	L 106–147	Jordan Poole (21)	Marvin Bagley III (14)	Tyus Jones (6)	Paycom Center; 18,203	9–47
57	February 25	Cleveland	L 105–114	Jordan Poole (31)	Marvin Bagley III (9)	Tyus Jones (11)	Capital One Arena; 17,895	9–48
58	February 27	Golden State	L 112–123	Kyle Kuzma (27)	Kyle Kuzma (12)	Tyus Jones (17)	Capital One Arena; 20,333	9–49
59	February 29	@ L.A. Lakers	L 131–134 (OT)	Jordan Poole (34)	Deni Avdija (15)	Tyus Jones (11)	Crypto.com Arena; 18,997	9–50

March: 5–11 (home: 3–6; road: 2–5)

Game	Date	Team	Score	High points	High rebounds	High assists	Location Attendance	Record
60	March 1	@ L.A. Clippers	L 115–140	Kyle Kuzma (32)	Marvin Bagley III (10)	Tyus Jones (9)	Crypto.com Arena; 19,370	9–51
61	March 4	@ Utah	L 115–127	Jordan Poole (32)	Deni Avdija (11)	Kyle Kuzma (8)	Delta Center; 18,206	9–52
62	March 6	Orlando	L 109–119	Jordan Poole (26)	Deni Avdija (7)	Tyus Jones (6)	Capital One Arena; 16,018	9–53
63	March 8	Charlotte	W 112–100	Kyle Kuzma (28)	Deni Avdija (14)	Kyle Kuzma (9)	Capital One Arena; 18,778	10–53
64	March 10	@ Miami	W 110–108	Kyle Kuzma (32)	Deni Avdija (10)	Tyus Jones (16)	Kaseya Center; 19,730	11–53
65	March 12	@ Memphis	L 97–109	Kyle Kuzma (24)	Kyle Kuzma (7)	Tyus Jones (9)	FedExForum; 15,291	11–54
66	March 14	@ Houston	L 119–135	Jordan Poole (25)	Deni Avdija (9)	Tyus Jones (8)	Toyota Center; 18,055	11–55
67	March 16	@ Chicago	L 98–127	Corey Kispert (16)	Bilal Coulibaly (8)	Jordan Poole (8)	United Center; 21,697	11–56
68	March 17	Boston	L 104–130	Jordan Poole (31)	Justin Champagnie (8)	Jared Butler (6)	Capital One Arena; 20,333	11–57
69	March 19	Houston	L 114–147	Bernard, Champagnie, Kispert (16)	Richaun Holmes (9)	Jared Butler (9)	Capital One Arena; 14,137	11–58
70	March 21	Sacramento	W 109–102	Kyle Kuzma (31)	Richaun Holmes (16)	Avdija, Kuzma (5)	Capital One Arena; 14,495	12–58
71	March 23	Toronto	W 112–109	Deni Avdija (22)	Richaun Holmes (14)	Jordan Poole (12)	Capital One Arena; 15,746	13–58
72	March 25	@ Chicago	W 107–105	Jordan Poole (23)	Richaun Holmes (15)	Jared Butler (13)	United Center; 21,726	14–58
73	March 27	Brooklyn	L 119–122 (OT)	Jordan Poole (38)	Deni Avdija (12)	Kyle Kuzma (10)	Capital One Arena; 15,159	14–59
74	March 29	Detroit	L 87–96	Corey Kispert (23)	Avdija, Bagley III (11)	Deni Avdija (9)	Capital One Arena; 15,023	14–60
75	March 31	Miami	L 107–119	Jordan Poole (22)	Marvin Bagley III (10)	Jordan Poole (8)	Capital One Arena; 16,039	14–61

April: 1–6 (home: 1–3; road: 0–3)

Game	Date	Team	Score	High points	High rebounds	High assists	Location Attendance	Record
76	April 2	Milwaukee	W 117–113	Corey Kispert (27)	Anthony Gill (9)	Jordan Poole (13)	Capital One Arena; 16,492	15–61
77	April 3	L.A. Lakers	L 120–125	Jordan Poole (29)	Kyle Kuzma (12)	Jared Butler (7)	Capital One Arena; 20,333	15–62
78	April 5	Portland	L 102–108	Deni Avdija (22)	Deni Avdija (12)	Jordan Poole (9)	Capital One Arena; 18,079	15–63
79	April 7	@ Toronto	L 122–130	Deni Avdija (32)	Patrick Baldwin Jr. (11)	Jordan Poole (12)	Scotiabank Arena; 19,502	15–64
80	April 9	@ Minnesota	L 121–130	Corey Kispert (25)	Anthony Gill (9)	Jordan Poole (6)	Target Center; 18,024	15–65
81	April 12	Chicago	L 127–129	Avdija, Kispert (23)	Avdija, Baldwin Jr. (12)	Jared Butler (10)	Capital One Arena; 20,333	15–66
82	April 14	@ Boston	L 122–132	Eugene Omoruyi (26)	Baldwin Jr., Champagnie (7)	Corey Kispert (8)	TD Garden; 19,156	15–67

2023–24 season schedule

=== In-Season Tournament ===
This was the first regular season where all the NBA teams would compete in a mid-season tournament setting due to the implementation of the 2023 NBA In-Season Tournament. During the in-season tournament period, the Wizards competed in Group B of the Eastern Conference, which included the Milwaukee Bucks, New York Knicks, Miami Heat, and Charlotte Hornets.

==== East group B ====
Pos	Team	Pld	W	L	PF	PA	PD	Qualification	MIL	NYK	MIA	CHA	WAS
1	Milwaukee Bucks	4	4	0	502	456	+46	Advance to knockout stage	—	110–105	131–124	130–99	131–128
2	New York Knicks	4	3	1	440	398	+42	Advance to knockout stage	105–110	—	100–98	115–91	120–99
3	Miami Heat	4	2	2	454	450	+4		124–131	98–100	—	111–105	121–114
4	Charlotte Hornets	4	1	3	419	473	−54		99–130	91–115	105–111	—	124–117
5	Washington Wizards	4	0	4	458	496	−38		128–131	99–120	114–121	117–124	—

Source: NBA
Rules for classification: Tiebreakers

== Player statistics ==
Legend
GP	Games played	GS	Games started	MPG	Minutes per game
FG%	Field-goal percentage	3P%	3-point field-goal percentage	FT%	Free-throw percentage
RPG	Rebounds per game	APG	Assists per game	SPG	Steals per game
BPG	Blocks per game	PPG	Points per game

=== Regular season ===
Washington Wizards statistics
Player	GP	GS	MPG	FG%	3P%	FT%	RPG	APG	SPG	BPG	PPG
Deni Avdija	75	75	30.1	.506	.374	.740	7.2	3.8	.8	.5	14.7
Marvin Bagley III^{†}	24	15	24.0	.581	.471	.708	8.1	1.2	.6	.8	13.3
Patrick Baldwin Jr.	38	7	13.0	.381	.320	.679	3.2	.8	.5	.4	4.4
Jules Bernard	19	0	7.8	.453	.379	.556	1.4	.8	.2	.1	3.9
Jared Butler	40	0	14.2	.488	.308	.861	1.5	3.2	.7	.2	6.3
Justin Champagnie	15	1	15.7	.410	.289	.800	3.5	1.3	.7	.6	5.9
Bilal Coulibaly	63	15	27.2	.435	.346	.702	4.1	1.7	.9	.8	8.4
Johnny Davis	50	6	12.3	.403	.350	.583	1.4	.6	.4	.2	3.0
Hamidou Diallo	2	0	2.5	.500			1.0	.5	1.0	.0	1.0
Daniel Gafford^{†}	45	45	26.5	.690		.706	8.0	1.5	1.0	2.2	10.9
Danilo Gallinari^{†}	26	0	14.8	.435	.313	.839	2.9	1.2	.2	.1	7.0
Anthony Gill	50	3	9.3	.469	.244	.806	1.9	.7	.3	.2	3.8
Richaun Holmes^{†}	17	8	18.7	.557	.333	.846	6.1	.6	.5	.6	7.1
Trey Jemison^{†}	2	0	0.5				.5	.0	.0	.0	.0
Tyus Jones	66	66	29.3	.489	.414	.800	2.7	7.3	1.1	.3	12.0
Corey Kispert	80	22	25.8	.486	.383	.726	2.8	2.0	.5	.2	13.4
Kyle Kuzma	70	70	32.6	.463	.336	.775	6.6	4.2	.5	.7	22.2
Mike Muscala^{†}	24	2	14.1	.367	.275	.750	3.1	.9	.2	.3	4.0
Eugene Omoruyi	43	0	9.1	.485	.283	.653	2.0	.8	.6	.1	4.8
Jordan Poole	78	66	30.1	.413	.326	.877	2.7	4.4	1.1	.3	17.4
Ryan Rollins^{†}	10	0	6.6	.520	.667	.765	1.1	1.1	.8	.3	4.1
Landry Shamet	46	5	15.8	.431	.338	.826	1.3	1.2	.5	.2	7.1
Tristan Vukčević	10	4	15.3	.433	.278	.773	3.6	1.3	.5	.7	8.5
Delon Wright^{†}	33	0	13.8	.393	.368	.828	1.8	2.5	1.1	.2	4.1

- ^{†} Denotes player spent time with another team in the season. Stats reflect time with the Wizards only.

== Transactions ==
=== Trades ===
June 23, 2023
To Washington Wizards

Tyus Jones (from Memphis)
Danilo Gallinari (from Boston)
Mike Muscala (from Boston)
Draft rights to Julian Phillips (No. 35) (from Boston)
To Boston Celtics

Kristaps Porziņģis (from Washington)
Draft rights to Marcus Sasser (No. 25) (from Memphis)
2024 GSW first-round pick (from Memphis)
To Memphis Grizzlies

Marcus Smart (from Boston)
June 24, 2023
To Washington Wizards

Chris Paul (from Phoenix)
Landry Shamet (from Phoenix)
Draft rights to Bilal Coulibaly (No. 7) (from Indiana)
Right to swap 2024 first round pick with Phoenix
Right to swap 2026 first round pick with Phoenix
Right to swap 2028 first round pick with Phoenix
Right to swap 2030 first round pick with Phoenix
2024 second round pick (from Phoenix)
2025 second round pick (from Phoenix)
2026 second round pick (from Phoenix)
2027 second round pick (from Phoenix)
2030 second round pick (from Phoenix)
Cash considerations (from Phoenix)
To Indiana Pacers

Draft rights to Jarace Walker (No. 8) (from Washington)
2028 second-round pick (from Phoenix)
2029 second-round pick (from Washington)
To Phoenix Suns

Bradley Beal (from Washington)
Jordan Goodwin (from Washington)
Isaiah Todd (from Washington)
June 28, 2023
To Washington Wizards

2026 CHI second-round pick
2027 CHI second-round pick

To Chicago Bulls

Draft rights to Julian Phillips (No. 35)

July 6, 2023
To Washington Wizards

Jordan Poole
Ryan Rollins
Patrick Baldwin Jr.
2027 GSW second-round draft pick
2030 GSW protected first-round pick
Cash Considerations

To Golden State Warriors

Chris Paul
Draft rights to Trayce Jackson-Davis (Pick #57)

July 6, 2023
To Washington Wizards

2027 second-round pick (from Brooklyn or Dallas)
To Detroit Pistons

Monté Morris
January 14, 2024
To Washington Wizards

Marvin Bagley III
Isaiah Livers
Second-round pick in the 2025 NBA draft
Second-round pick in the 2026 NBA draft
To Detroit Pistons

Danilo Gallinari
Mike Muscala
February 8, 2024
To Washington Wizards

Richaun Holmes
First-round pick in the 2024 NBA draft
To Dallas Mavericks

Daniel Gafford

=== Free agency ===
==== Re-signed ====
Player	Date Signed	Contract	Ref.
Kyle Kuzma	June 30, 2023	4 years, $90M	

==== Additions ====
Player	Date Signed	Contract	Former Team	Ref.
Eugene Omoruyi	July 13, 2023	Two-way contract	Detroit Pistons	
Jared Butler	July 24, 2023	Two-way contract	Oklahoma City Thunder	

==== Subtractions ====
Player	Date Left	Reason	New Team	Ref.
Jay Huff	June 29, 2023	No Qualifying Offer, UFA	Denver Nuggets	
Quenton Jackson	July 24, 2023	Waived		
Ryan Rollins	January 8, 2024	Waived		
