= Ryan Rollins =

American basketball player (born 2002)

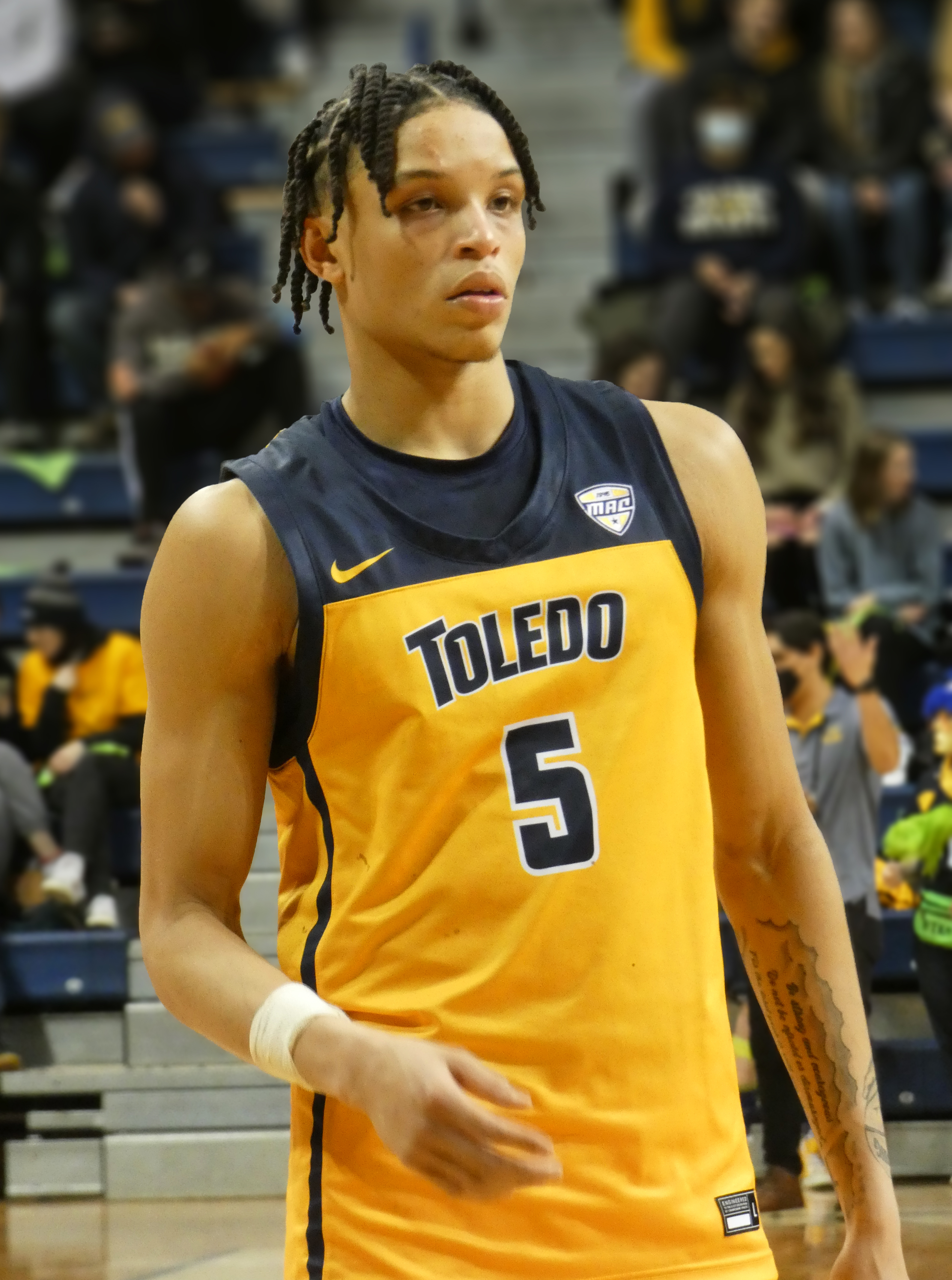
- Rollins with Toledo in 2022

No. 13 – Milwaukee Bucks
- Position: Point guard
- League: NBA

Personal information
- Born: July 3, 2002 (age 24) Macomb, Michigan, U.S.
- Listed height: 6 ft 3 in (1.91 m)
- Listed weight: 180 lb (82 kg)

Career information
- High school: Dakota (Macomb Township, Michigan)
- College: Toledo (2020–2022)
- NBA draft: 2022: 2nd round, 44th overall pick
- Drafted by: Atlanta Hawks
- Playing career: 2022–present

Career history
- 2022–2023: Golden State Warriors
- 2022–2023: →Santa Cruz Warriors
- 2023–2024: Washington Wizards
- 2023–2024: →Capital City Go-Go
- 2024–present: Milwaukee Bucks
- 2024–2025: →Wisconsin Herd

Career highlights
- NBA Cup champion (2024); First-team All-MAC (2022); MAC Freshman of the Year (2021); MAC All-Freshman Team (2021)
- Stats at NBA.com
- Stats at Basketball Reference

Ryan Anthony Rollins (born July 3, 2002) is an American professional basketball player for the Milwaukee Bucks of the National Basketball Association (NBA). He played college basketball for the Toledo Rockets.

== Early life ==
Rollins was born and raised in Detroit, Michigan. He played basketball for Dakota High School in Macomb Township, Michigan. As a junior, he averaged 17.1 points, seven rebounds, 3.2 assists and 2.5 steals per game, missing the second half of the season with a hamstring injury. In his senior season, Rollins averaged 25.5 points, nine rebounds and five assists per game, earning second-team All-State honors from the Associated Press. A three-star recruit, he committed to playing college basketball for Toledo after the program prioritized him early in the recruiting process.

== College career ==
Rollins immediately made an impact as a freshman at Toledo. He averaged 13.7 points, 5.2 rebounds and 2.5 assists per game, and was named Mid-American Conference (MAC) Freshman of the Year after helping his team win the MAC regular season title. Rollins assumed a leading role in his sophomore season with the transfer of Marreon Jackson. On November 24, 2021, he scored a career-high 35 points in a 79–70 victory over Coastal Carolina to win the Nassau Championship, where he was named tournament most valuable player. Rollins helped Toledo repeat as MAC regular season champions. As a sophomore, he averaged 18.9 points, six rebounds and 3.6 assists per game, earning first-team All-MAC honors. On April 7, 2022, Rollins declared for the 2022 NBA draft while maintaining his college eligibility. He opted to remain in the draft, forgoing his remaining college eligibility.

== Professional career ==
=== Golden State Warriors (2022–2023) ===
In the 2022 NBA draft, Rollins was selected by the Atlanta Hawks with the 44th overall pick. He was later traded to the Golden State Warriors in exchange for the draft rights to Tyrese Martin, the 51st pick in the draft, and cash considerations. On July 28, 2022, Rollins signed his rookie contract with the Warriors. He did not play for the Warriors in the NBA Summer League due to a right foot injury.

On February 6, 2023, the Warriors announced that Rollins would undergo season-ending surgery to repair a Jones fracture of the fifth metatarsal in his right foot.

=== Washington Wizards (2023–2024) ===
On July 6, 2023, Rollins was traded, alongside Jordan Poole, Patrick Baldwin Jr. and draft picks, to the Washington Wizards in exchange for Chris Paul. However, he was waived on January 8, 2024.

=== Milwaukee Bucks (2024–present) ===
On February 21, 2024, Rollins signed a two–year, two-way contract with the Milwaukee Bucks. He would make three appearances for Milwaukee during the remainder of the year.

On March 4, 2025, the Bucks converted Rollins' two-way contract into a standard NBA contract. He made 53 appearances (19 starts) for Milwaukee during the 2024–25 NBA season, averaging 6.2 points, 1.9 rebounds and 1.9 assists.

On July 8, 2025, Rollins signed a three-year, $12 million contract to return to the Bucks. Entering the 2025–26 season, he was named the starting point guard after the team waived Damian Lillard. On October 30, Rollins put up a career-high 32 points in a 120–110 win over the Golden State Warriors.

The 2025-2026 season proved to be a break out year for Rollins, with him becoming the team's starting point guard. He played 74 games and averaged 17.4 points, 4.6 rebounds, 5.6 assists and 1.5 steals a game.

== Career statistics ==
Legend
| GP | Games played | GS | Games started | MPG | Minutes per game |
| FG% | Field goal percentage | 3P% | 3-point field goal percentage | FT% | Free throw percentage |
| RPG | Rebounds per game | APG | Assists per game | SPG | Steals per game |
| BPG | Blocks per game | PPG | Points per game | **Bold** | Career high |

=== NBA ===
| Year | Team | GP | GS | MPG | FG% | 3P% | FT% | RPG | APG | SPG | BPG | PPG |
|---|---|---|---|---|---|---|---|---|---|---|---|---|
| 2022–23 | Golden State | 12 | 0 | 5.2 | .350 | .333 | **1.000** | 1.0 | .5 | .1 | .1 | 1.9 |
| 2023–24 | Washington | 10 | 0 | 6.6 | **.520** | .667 | .765 | 1.1 | 1.1 | .8 | .3 | 4.1 |
| 2023–24 | Milwaukee | 3 | 0 | 4.0 | .500 | **1.000** | — | .7 | 1.0 | .7 | .0 | 1.0 |
| 2024–25 | Milwaukee | 56 | 19 | 14.6 | .487 | .408 | .800 | 1.9 | 1.9 | .8 | .3 | 6.2 |
| 2025–26 | Milwaukee | **74** | **67** | **32.1** | .472 | .406 | .796 | **4.6** | **5.6** | **1.5** | **.4** | **17.3** |
| Career | | 155 | 86 | 21.5 | .474 | .408 | .800 | 3.0 | 3.5 | 1.1 | .3 | 10.9 |

=== College ===
| Year | Team | GP | GS | MPG | FG% | 3P% | FT% | RPG | APG | SPG | BPG | PPG |
|---|---|---|---|---|---|---|---|---|---|---|---|---|
| 2020–21 | Toledo | 30 | 30 | 30.2 | .431 | **.323** | .786 | 5.2 | 2.5 | 1.1 | .1 | 13.7 |
| 2021–22 | Toledo | **34** | **34** | **32.7** | **.468** | .311 | **.802** | **6.0** | **3.6** | **1.7** | **.3** | **18.9** |
| Career | | 64 | 64 | 31.5 | .453 | .317 | .796 | 5.6 | 3.1 | 1.4 | .2 | 16.4 |

== Personal life ==
Rollins' family consists of mother Toni, father Chris, and brother Christopher. Christopher played college basketball for Davenport.

On January 12, 2024, Rollins was charged with seven counts of petty larceny after being caught shoplifting household items from a local Target store on seven occasions.

== See also ==
- List of NBA career 3-point field goal percentage leaders
