= Patrick Baldwin Jr. =

American basketball player (born 2002)

No. 24 – Crvena zvezda Meridianbet
- Position: Power forward
- League: KLS; ABA League; EuroLeague

Personal information
- Born: November 18, 2002 (age 23) Green Bay, Wisconsin, U.S.
- Listed height: 2.06 m (6 ft 9 in)
- Listed weight: 100 kg (220 lb)

Career information
- High school: Hamilton (Sussex, Wisconsin)
- College: Milwaukee (2021–2022)
- NBA draft: 2022: 1st round, 28th overall pick
- Drafted by: Golden State Warriors
- Playing career: 2022–present

Career history
- 2022–2023: Golden State Warriors
- 2022–2023: →Santa Cruz Warriors
- 2023–2025: Washington Wizards
- 2023–2025: →Capital City Go-Go
- 2025: San Diego Clippers
- 2025: Los Angeles Clippers
- 2025: →San Diego Clippers
- 2026: Los Angeles Clippers
- 2026: Philadelphia 76ers
- 2026: San Diego Clippers
- 2026: Sacramento Kings
- 2026: →Stockton Kings
- 2026–present: Crvena zvezda

Career highlights
- McDonald's All-American (2021); Nike Hoop Summit (2021)
- Stats at NBA.com
- Stats at Basketball Reference
Medals
Men's basketball
Representing the United States
FIBA Under-19 World Cup
Gold medal – first place	2021 Latvia	Team

Patrick O'Neal Baldwin Jr. (born November 18, 2002) is an American professional basketball player for Crvena zvezda of the Basketball League of Serbia (KLS), the ABA League, and the EuroLeague. He played college basketball for the Milwaukee Panthers. He was a consensus five-star recruit and one of the top players in the 2021 class.

== Early life ==
Patrick Baldwin grew up in Evanston, Illinois until he was in 8th grade. He was on several basketball teams including the league FAAM (Fellowship of Afro-American Men). In 2017, the summer before his freshman year, the Baldwin family moved to Wisconsin, because his father became the head men's basketball coach at the University of Wisconsin–Milwaukee.

== High school career ==
Baldwin played basketball for Hamilton High School in Sussex, Wisconsin. During his freshman year he was part of their 2017–18 team that made the state tournament, losing to future NBA All–Star Tyrese Haliburton and Oshkosh North 57–56 in the final. As a junior, Baldwin averaged 24.3 points and 10.8 rebounds per game, earning Wisconsin Gatorade Player of the Year honors. During the second game of his senior season, Baldwin suffered a season-ending ankle injury. He was named to the rosters for the McDonald's All-American Game, Jordan Brand Classic and Nike Hoop Summit.

=== Recruiting ===
Baldwin was a consensus five-star recruit and one of the top players in the 2021 class. On May 12, 2021, he committed to playing college basketball for Milwaukee under the coaching of his father over offers from Duke, Arizona State, Iowa, Kansas, Kentucky, LSU, Michigan, North Carolina, USC and Georgetown. He was also the youngest person ever to receive an offer to play at Duke, receiving the offer in his sophomore year of high school. He became the highest-rated recruit to ever commit to a Horizon League program.

College recruiting
Name	Hometown	School	Height	Weight	Commit date
Patrick Baldwin Jr. SF	Evanston, IL	Hamilton (WI)	6 ft 11 in (2.11 m)	205 lb (93 kg)	May 12, 2021
Patrick Baldwin Jr. SF	Recruit ratings: Rivals: 247Sports: ESPN: (97)				
Overall recruit ranking: Rivals: 7 247Sports: 7 ESPN: 5
Note: In many cases, Scout, Rivals, 247Sports, On3, and ESPN may conflict in their listings of height and weight.; In these cases, the average was taken. ESPN grades are on a 100-point scale.; Sources: "Milwaukee 2021 Basketball Commitments". Rivals.; "2021 Milwaukee Panthers Recruiting Class". ESPN.; "2021 Team Ranking". Rivals.

== College career ==
In his college debut, Baldwin posted 21 points and 10 rebounds in a 75–60 win against North Dakota. On November 23, 2021, he suffered a leg injury in a loss to Bowling Green, forcing him to miss several games. Baldwin suffered an ankle injury on January 5, 2022, in a 63–49 win against Green Bay. Baldwin returned on February 4, 2022, in a 70–60 loss to Purdue Fort Wayne, where he shot 5-of-15, and 1-of-6 from 3. He also played the next two conference games against Cleveland State and Northern Kentucky, averaging 30 minutes and 6.5 points while shooting 4-of-19 overall (1-of-11 from 3), before sitting out the rest of the season for undisclosed reasons. Baldwin averaged 12.1 points and 5.8 rebounds per game as a freshman in an injury-plagued season. On April 22, 2022, Baldwin declared for the 2022 NBA draft, forgoing his remaining college eligibility.

== Professional career ==
=== Golden State / Santa Cruz Warriors (2022–2023) ===
Baldwin was selected with the 28th overall pick by the Golden State Warriors in the 2022 NBA draft. On July 6, 2022, the Warriors announced that they had signed Baldwin.

Baldwin was assigned to the Golden State G League affiliate, the Santa Cruz Warriors, on October 24, 2022. He then made his NBA debut on October 30 in a 128–114 loss to the Detroit Pistons, playing only in the final minute of the game.

On December 21, 2022, Baldwin scored a career high of 17 points in a 143–113 blowout loss to the Brooklyn Nets, shooting 6-of-10 overall and 5-of-8 from three in 23 minutes of play. This performance was followed by an 11-point showing in a 112–107 victory over the Utah Jazz a week later, shooting 4-of-7 overall and 3-of-5 from three in just 13 minutes. Baldwin was assigned to the G League again on February 5, 2023.

=== Washington Wizards / Capital City Go-Go (2023–2025) ===
On July 6, 2023, the Warriors traded Baldwin, Jordan Poole, Ryan Rollins and draft picks to the Washington Wizards in exchange for Chris Paul. Throughout his first two seasons with the Wizards, he had been assigned several times to the Capital City Go-Go.

On February 6, 2025, Baldwin was traded to the San Antonio Spurs in a multi-team trade, but was waived the next day.

=== San Diego / Los Angeles Clippers (2025–2026) ===
On February 19, 2025, Baldwin signed with the San Diego Clippers of the NBA G League, and on March 1, he signed a two-way contract with the Los Angeles Clippers. Baldwin made two appearances for Los Angeles, averaging 3.0 points, 1.5 rebounds, and 0.5 assists. On July 29, Baldwin was waived by the Clippers. On October 2, the Clippers signed Baldwin Jr. to a training camp contract. He was waived prior to the start of the regular season on October 18.

On January 16, 2026, Baldwin signed a 10-day contract with Los Angeles. In two games for the Clippers, he averaged 5.0 points and 0.5 rebounds.

=== Philadelphia 76ers (2026) ===
On February 5, 2026, Baldwin signed a 10-day contract with the Philadelphia 76ers. He made one appearance for the 76ers, recording no points and one rebound. Following the expiration of his 10-day contract, Baldwin returned to the San Diego Clippers.

=== Sacramento Kings (2026) ===
On February 22, 2026, Baldwin signed a two-way contract with the Sacramento Kings. Baldwin made six appearances (including one start) for Sacramento, recording averages of 3.8 points, 3.5 rebounds, and 0.8 assists.

=== Crvena zvezda Meridianbet (2026–present) ===
On July 18, 2026, Baldwin signed with Crvena zvezda of the Basketball League of Serbia (KLS), the ABA League, and the EuroLeague.

== National team career ==
Baldwin represented the United States at the 2021 FIBA Under-19 World Cup in Latvia. He averaged 7.7 points and five rebounds per game, helping the team win the gold medal. He shot 47 percent from the floor, helping the team win the gold medal. He also took National Team July minicamp and was selected for the Nike Hoop Summit Team, but this event was not played due to COVID-19.

== Career statistics ==
Legend
GP	Games played	GS	Games started	MPG	Minutes per game
FG%	Field goal percentage	3P%	3-point field goal percentage	FT%	Free throw percentage
RPG	Rebounds per game	APG	Assists per game	SPG	Steals per game
BPG	Blocks per game	PPG	Points per game	**Bold**	Career high

=== NBA ===
==== Regular season ====
Year	Team	GP	GS	MPG	FG%	3P%	FT%	RPG	APG	SPG	BPG	PPG
2022–23	Golden State	31	0	7.3	.394	.381	.667	1.3	.4	.2	.1	3.9
2023–24	Washington	**38**	**7**	13.0	.381	.320	**.679**	3.2	**.8**	**.5**	.4	**4.4**
2024–25	Washington	22	0	4.6	.515	.524	.500	1.0	.1	.1	.1	2.1
2024–25	L.A. Clippers	2	0	3.0	**1.000**	**1.000**	–	1.5	.5	.0	.0	3.0
2025–26	L.A. Clippers	2	0	6.0	.750	.667	**1.000**	.5	.0	.0	.0	5.0
2025–26	Philadelphia	1	0	2.0	–	–	–	1.0	.0	.0	.0	.0
2025–26	Sacramento	6	1	**14.7**	.348	.364	.600	**3.5**	**.8**	**.5**	**.8**	3.8
Career		102	8	9.1	.405	.376	.667	2.1	.5	.3	.3	3.7

==== Playoffs ====
Year	Team	GP	GS	MPG	FG%	3P%	FT%	RPG	APG	SPG	BPG	PPG
2023	Golden State	3	0	3.8	.000	.000	–	1.0	.3	.0	.0	.0
Career		3	0	3.8	.000	.000	–	1.0	.3	.0	.0	.0

=== College ===
Year	Team	GP	GS	MPG	FG%	3P%	FT%	RPG	APG	SPG	BPG	PPG
2021–22	Milwaukee	11	10	28.5	.344	.266	.743	5.8	1.5	.8	.8	12.1

== Personal life ==
Baldwin was born in Evanston, Illinois. His father, Pat, was a standout college basketball player at Northwestern, then was head coach at Milwaukee and is currently an assistant at Valparaiso. His mother, Shawn, played volleyball at Northwestern.
