= Jules Bernard =

American basketball player (born 2000)

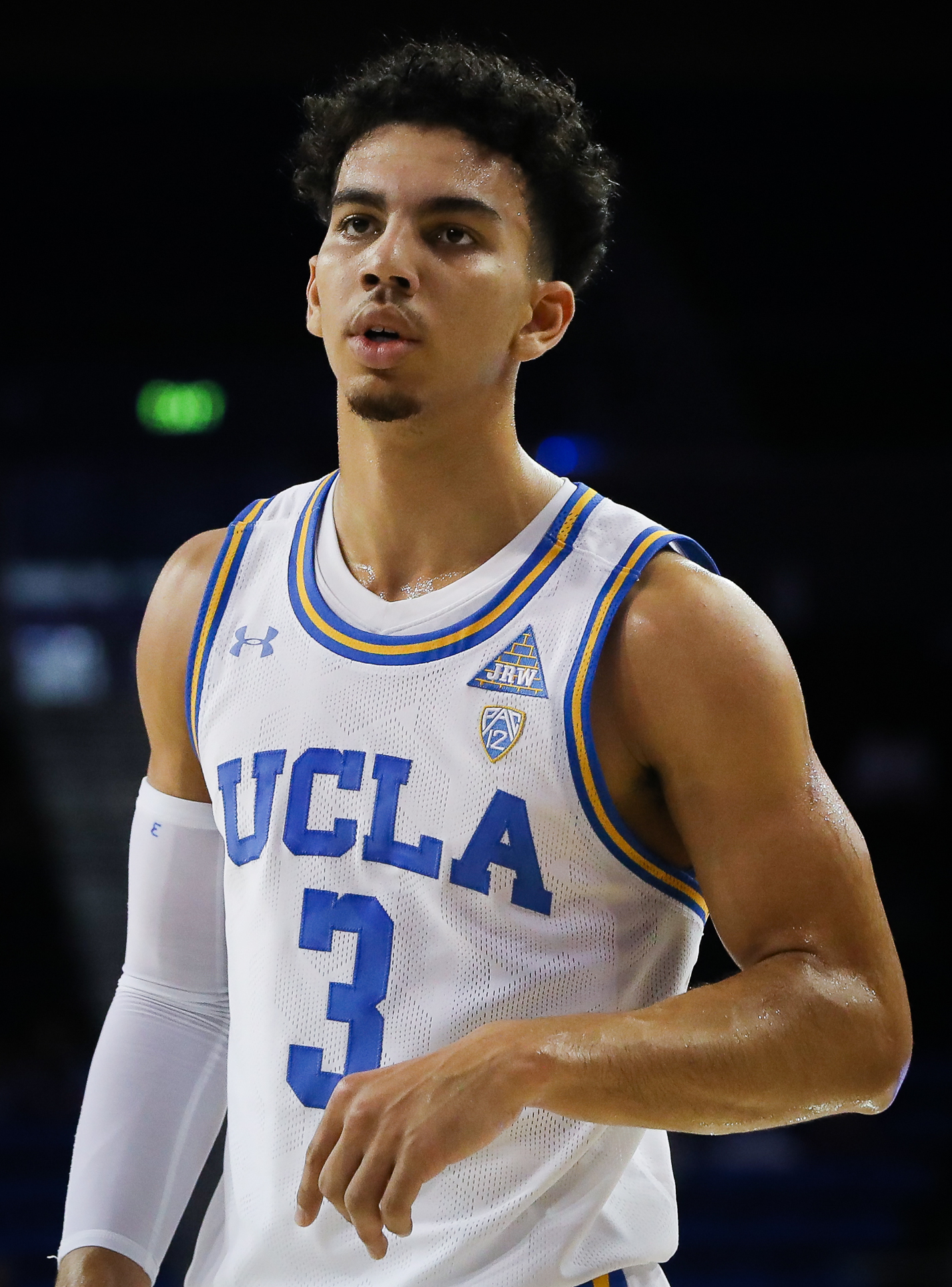
- Bernard with UCLA in 2019

No. 5 – Iowa Wolves
- Position: Shooting guard
- League: NBA G League

Personal information
- Born: January 21, 2000 (age 26) Los Angeles, California, U.S.
- Listed height: 6 ft 6 in (1.98 m)
- Listed weight: 210 lb (95 kg)

Career information
- High school: Windward School (Los Angeles, California)
- College: UCLA (2018–2022)
- NBA draft: 2022: undrafted
- Playing career: 2022–present

Career history
- 2022: Motor City Cruise
- 2022–2023: Capital City Go-Go
- 2023–2024: Washington Wizards
- 2023–2024: →Capital City Go-Go
- 2024–2025: Cleveland Charge
- 2025–present: Iowa Wolves
- Stats at NBA.com
- Stats at Basketball Reference

Jules Liam Bernard (born January 21, 2000) is an American professional basketball player for the Iowa Wolves of the NBA G League. He played college basketball for the UCLA Bruins.

== High school career ==
Bernard played basketball for Windward School in Los Angeles. As a junior, he averaged 25.3 points and 13.7 rebounds per game. In his senior season, Bernard averaged 26.4 points and 14.2 rebounds per game. He competed for the Compton Magic on the Amateur Athletic Union circuit. A consensus four-star recruit, he committed to playing college basketball for UCLA in October 2017 over offers from Kansas, USC, Oregon and Miami (Florida). He was attracted to the Bruins by their program's history and head coach Steve Alford being open to playing skilled freshmen.

== College career ==
As a freshman at UCLA, Bernard averaged 7.6 points and 3.1 rebounds per game. In his sophomore season, he averaged 5.5 points and 2.6 rebounds per game. On March 3, 2021, he scored a career-high 23 points in an 82–72 loss to Oregon. As a junior, Bernard averaged 10.3 points and 5.1 rebounds per game.

In his senior year in 2021–22, he continued to decrease his turnovers after nearly committing twice as many turnovers as assists in his first two seasons. He had a season-high 22 points in each of the Bruins' two games against Long Beach State. Bernard ended the season with nine consecutive games scoring in double figures, including a team-high 16 points in UCLA's season-ending loss to North Carolina in the Sweet Sixteen of the 2022 NCAA tournament. As a senior, Bernard averaged 12.8 points and 4.7 rebounds per game.

After the season, he declared for the NBA draft, but did not hire an agent to maintain his college eligibility; the NCAA allowed an extra year due to the COVID-19 pandemic. He was invited to the NBA G League Elite Camp but did not receive an invitation to the NBA Draft Combine. He had a workout with the Los Angeles Lakers before deciding to remain in the draft, minutes before the deadline to return to school.

== Professional career ==
=== Motor City Cruise (2022) ===
After going undrafted in the 2022 NBA draft, Bernard played with the Detroit Pistons in the 2022 NBA Summer League. He scored in double digits once in the first four games before scoring a team-high 22 points in the finale, including 14 points in the third quarter. He was later added to the Pistons' training camp roster after signing an Exhibit 10 contract. Bernard played in three of the team's four preseason games before being released. He was later named to the training camp roster for the Motor City Cruise, the Pistons' G League affiliate.

=== Capital City Go-Go (2022–2023) ===
On December 22, 2022, Bernard was traded from the Motor City to the Capital City Go-Go.

On October 1, 2023, Bernard signed with the Washington Wizards, but was waived on October 19. On October 30, he returned to Capital City.

=== Washington Wizards (2023–2024) ===
On December 8, 2023, Bernard signed a two-way contract with the Washington Wizards. On the same day, Bernard made his NBA debut for the Wizards in a 124–97 loss to the Brooklyn Nets. He made 19 total appearances for Washington, averaging 3.9 points and 1.4 rebounds.

=== Cleveland Charge (2024–2025) ===
On September 24, 2024, Bernard signed with the Cleveland Cavaliers, but was waived on October 19. On October 26, he joined the Cleveland Charge.

=== Iowa Wolves (2025–present) ===
On November 6, 2025, Bernard was named to the Iowa Wolves' opening night roster. On February 25, 2026, Bernard signed a two-way contract with the Minnesota Timberwolves. However, three days later he was waived by Minnesota without having appeared for the team.

On September 18, 2026, Bernard signed a non–guaranteed, training camp contract with the Timberwolves. However, he was waived by Minnesota the same day.

== Career statistics ==
Legend
GP	Games played	GS	Games started	MPG	Minutes per game
FG%	Field goal percentage	3P%	3-point field goal percentage	FT%	Free throw percentage
RPG	Rebounds per game	APG	Assists per game	SPG	Steals per game
BPG	Blocks per game	PPG	Points per game	**Bold**	Career high

=== NBA ===
==== Regular season ====
Year	Team	GP	GS	MPG	FG%	3P%	FT%	RPG	APG	SPG	BPG	PPG
2023–24	Washington	19	0	7.9	.453	.379	.556	1.4	.8	.2	.1	3.9
Career		19	0	7.9	.453	.379	.556	1.4	.8	.2	.1	3.9

=== College ===
Year	Team	GP	GS	MPG	FG%	3P%	FT%	RPG	APG	SPG	BPG	PPG
2018–19	UCLA	33	2	17.2	**.469**	.371	.739	3.1	.8	.5	.1	7.6
2019–20	UCLA	30	1	16.2	.390	.317	.784	2.6	.6	.5	**.2**	5.5
2020–21	UCLA	32	28	29.3	.441	**.396**	.744	**5.1**	1.6	.5	**.2**	10.3
2021–22	UCLA	**35**	**34**	**30.1**	.419	.337	**.818**	4.7	**1.7**	**1.0**	**.2**	**12.8**
Career		130	65	23.4	.430	.354	.774	3.9	1.2	.6	.2	9.2
