= Jared Butler =

American basketball player (born 2000)

- Butler with the Washington Wizards in 2024

No. 6 – Crvena zvezda
- Position: Point guard
- League: KLS; ABA League; EuroLeague

Personal information
- Born: August 25, 2000 (age 26) Reserve, Louisiana, U.S.
- Listed height: 1.92 m (6 ft 4 in)
- Listed weight: 193 lb (88 kg)

Career information
- High school: Riverside Academy (Reserve, Louisiana)
- College: Baylor (2018–2021)
- NBA draft: 2021: 2nd round, 40th overall pick
- Drafted by: New Orleans Pelicans
- Playing career: 2021–present

Career history
- 2021: Utah Jazz
- 2021–2022: →Salt Lake City Stars
- 2022–2023: Grand Rapids Gold
- 2023: Oklahoma City Thunder
- 2023: →Oklahoma City Blue
- 2023–2025: Washington Wizards
- 2023–2025: →Capital City Go-Go
- 2025: Philadelphia 76ers
- 2025–present: Crvena zvezda

Career highlights
- Serbian Cup winner (2026); NCAA champion (2021); NCAA Final Four Most Outstanding Player (2021); Consensus first-team All-American (2021); Third-team All-American – AP, SN, USBWA, NABC (2020); 2× First-team All-Big 12 (2020, 2021); Big 12 All-Defensive Team (2021); Big 12 All-Freshman Team (2019)
- Stats at NBA.com
- Stats at Basketball Reference

Jared Gladwyn Butler (born August 25, 2000) is an American professional basketball player for Crvena zvezda of the Basketball League of Serbia (KLS), the ABA League, and the EuroLeague. He played college basketball for the Baylor Bears and as a junior in 2021, he was named a consensus first-team All-American and helped lead the team to a national championship. Butler was named the Final Four Most Outstanding Player (MOP).

== Early life ==
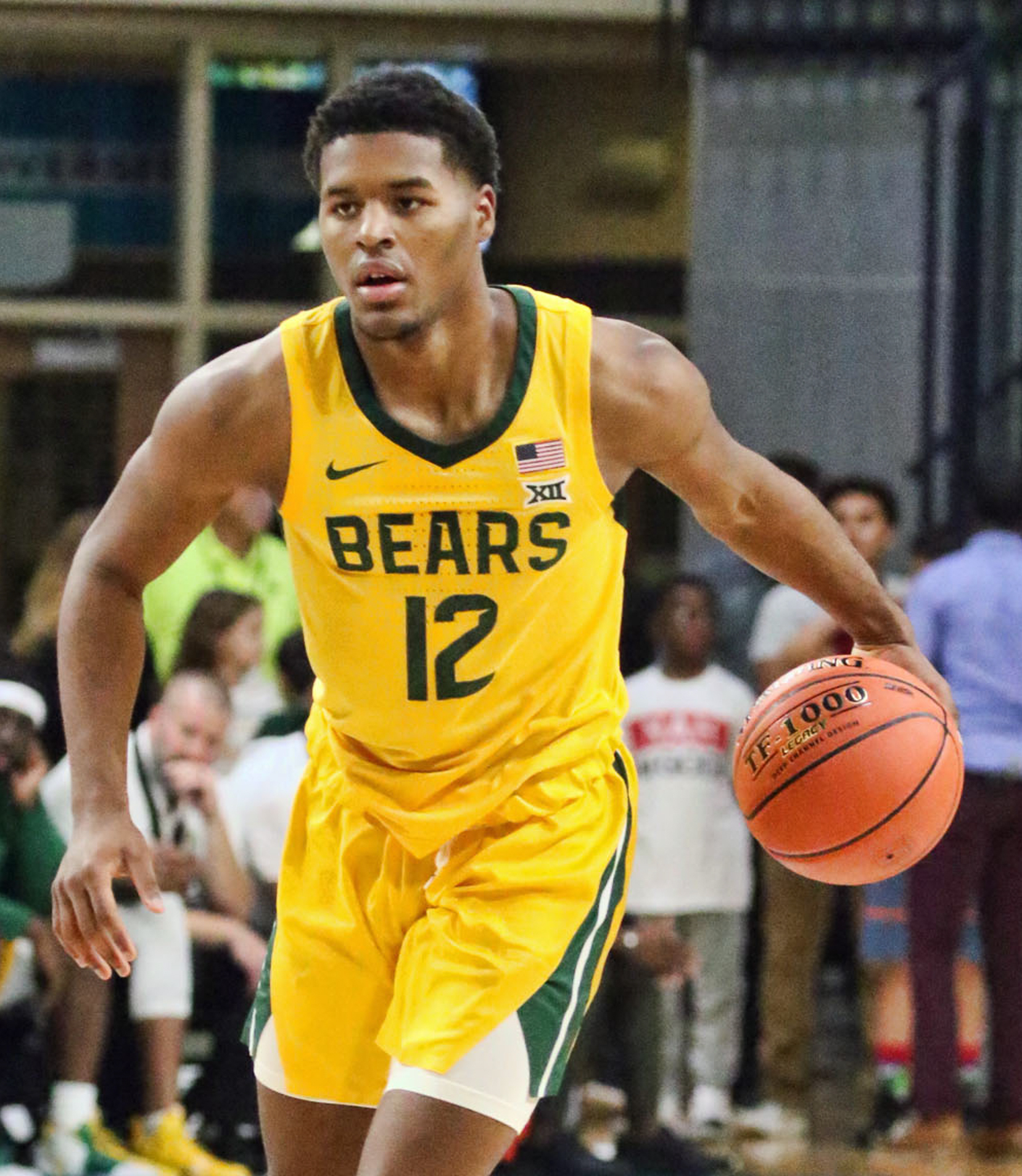
Butler in 2019

Butler is the son of Richard and Juanea Butler. By the time he was eleven years old, he was competing in out-of-state basketball tournaments. Butler grew up in Reserve, Louisiana and attended Riverside Academy, where he joined the school's varsity basketball team as an eighth-grader. As a junior, he averaged 20.4 points and 6.7 assists and was named first-team All-State. Butler averaged 27.4 points, 8.8 rebounds, 8.4 assists and 3.0 steals during his senior season and was again named first-team All-State as well as Player of the Year by The Times-Picayune. Rated a four-star prospect, Butler committed to play college basketball at Alabama over offers from Virginia and Baylor. He picked the Crimson Tide because he was confused why Baylor was not recruiting him harder despite his coach Tim Byrd being friends with Bears coach Scott Drew; the Bears were short on scholarships and long on guards.

== College career ==
Butler enrolled at Alabama, but did not participate in the team's summer workouts and requested an unconditional release from his letter of intent in order to transfer to Baylor University. Alabama released him from his commitment in August. A scholarship had opened up at Baylor due to the early retirement of Jake Lindsey.

Butler was eligible to play immediately after transferring due to his release. He averaged 10.2 points, 3.1 rebounds and 2.7 assists as a true freshman and was named honorable mention All-Big 12 Conference and to the league's All-Freshman team. Butler was named the Big 12 Newcomer of the Week on February 25, 2019, after averaging 14.5 points, 4.5 assists and 4.0 rebounds in conference games against Iowa State and West Virginia.

Butler was named the 98th-best collegiate basketball player going into the 2019–20 season by CBS Sports. On November 5, 2019, Butler scored 30 points and made a career-high eight three-pointers in a 105–61 win over Central Arkansas. He was named the MVP of the 2019 Myrtle Beach Invitational and the Big 12 Player of the Week after averaging 17.7 points, 3.7 assists and 2.7 steals over three games as the Bears won the tournament. On January 11, 2020, Butler scored 22 points as Baylor defeated Kansas for its first win ever at the Phog Allen Fieldhouse. As a result, he earned his second Big 12 Player of the Week honors on January 13. On February 3, he was added to the revised 20-man Wooden Award watchlist and was named one of ten finalists for the Bob Cousy Award. At the conclusion of the regular season, Butler was named first-team All-Big 12 and a third-team All-American by the Associated Press, USBWA, NABC and Sporting News after averaging 16.0 points, 3.2 rebounds, 3.1 assists and 1.6 steals per game. Following the season, Butler declared for the 2020 NBA draft. On August 3, he announced he was withdrawing from the draft and returning to Baylor.

Coming into his junior season, Butler was named Preseason Big 12 Player of the Year. On January 18, 2021, he recorded a season-high 30 points and eight assists in a 77–69 win against Kansas. Butler was a unanimous First Team All-Big 12 selection and earned consensus first-team All-American honors. He led Baylor to its first national championship, and was named NCAA tournament Most Outstanding Player after posting 22 points and seven assists in an 86–70 win over previously undefeated Gonzaga in the title game. As a junior, Butler averaged 16.7 points, 4.8 assists and 3.3 rebounds per game. On May 30, he declared for the 2021 NBA draft, forgoing his remaining college eligibility.

== Professional career ==
=== Utah Jazz / Salt Lake City Stars (2021–2022) ===
On June 22, 2021, Butler was referred to a fitness-to-play panel by the NBA and was not permitted to play or practice in the league. On July 17, he was medically cleared to play in the NBA. On July 29, Butler was selected in the second round of the 2021 NBA draft with the 40th overall pick by the New Orleans Pelicans, but was traded to the Utah Jazz via the Memphis Grizzlies. On August 12, he signed his rookie scale contract with the Jazz. On March 18, 2022, Butler recorded a career-high 21 points, alongside seven assists, in a 121–92 win over the Los Angeles Clippers. On October 15, 2022, Butler was waived by the Jazz.

=== Grand Rapids Gold (2022–2023) ===
On November 4, 2022, Butler was named to the opening night roster for the Grand Rapids Gold.

=== Oklahoma City Thunder / Blue (2023) ===
On March 3, 2023, Butler signed a two-way contract with the Oklahoma City Thunder.

=== Washington Wizards / Capital City Go-Go (2023–2025) ===
On July 28, 2023, Butler signed a two-way contract with the Washington Wizards and on March 5, 2024, he signed a multi-year deal with the Wizards. However, he was waived in October 19 and two days later, he signed another two-way contract with Washington.

On January 9, 2025, Butler put up a career-high 26 points, along with four rebounds and seven assists in a 109–103 loss to the Philadelphia 76ers.

=== Philadelphia 76ers (2025) ===
On February 6, 2025, Butler was traded to the Philadelphia 76ers in exchange for Reggie Jackson. He was converted on to a standard contract on February 14. In 28 appearances (17 starts) for Philadelphia, Butler averaged 11.5 points, 2.5 rebounds, and 4.9 assists.

On July 24, 2025, Butler signed a one year $2.5 million contract with the Phoenix Suns. He was waived prior to the start of the 2025–26 NBA season on October 17.

=== Crvena zvezda (2025–present) ===
On October 23, 2025, Butler signed with Crvena zvezda Belgrade of the ABA League and the EuroLeague. On July 9, 2026, Butler's contract with the team was extended through 2028.

== Career statistics ==
Legend
GP	Games played	GS	Games started	MPG	Minutes per game
FG%	Field goal percentage	3P%	3-point field goal percentage	FT%	Free throw percentage
RPG	Rebounds per game	APG	Assists per game	SPG	Steals per game
BPG	Blocks per game	PPG	Points per game	**Bold**	Career high

=== NBA ===
==== Regular season ====
Year	Team	GP	GS	MPG	FG%	3P%	FT%	RPG	APG	SPG	BPG	PPG
2021–22	Utah	**42**	**1**	8.6	.404	.318	.688	1.1	1.5	.4	.2	3.8
2022–23	Oklahoma City	6	1	12.8	.469	**.500**	—	.7	1.3	.8	.0	6.2
2023–24	Washington	40	0	14.1	**.488**	.308	.861	1.5	3.2	.7	.2	6.3
2024–25	Washington	32	0	11.3	.483	.366	.778	1.3	2.6	.4	.2	6.9
2024–25	Philadelphia	28	**17**	**24.4**	.426	.352	**.870**	**2.5**	**4.9**	**1.1**	**.3**	**11.5**
Career		148	19	13.8	.450	.341	.818	1.5	2.8	.6	.2	6.7

==== Playoffs ====
Year	Team	GP	GS	MPG	FG%	3P%	FT%	RPG	APG	SPG	BPG	PPG
2022	Utah	1	0	5.0	.000	—	—	1.0	.0	.0	.0	.0
Career		1	0	5.0	.000	—	—	1.0	.0	.0	.0	.0

=== Domestic leagues ===
Year	Team	League	GP	MPG	FG%	3P%	FT%	RPG	APG	SPG	BPG	PPG
2021–22	(United States) Salt Lake City Stars	G League	8	29.9	.435	.314	.813	4.1	6.0	1.8	.6	20.2
2022–23	(United States) Grand Rapids Gold	G League	23	30.2	.438	.354	.840	3.3	5.8	.9	.1	17.1
2022–23	(United States) Oklahoma City Blue	G League	4	29.0	.447	.389	.833	2.8	8.8	.8	.3	14.3
2023–24	(United States) Capital City Go-Go	G League	23	32.7	.472	.353	.920	3.1	7.3	1.6	.4	18.8
2024–25	(United States) Capital City Go-Go	G League	2	30.5	.577	.429	.750	4.5	6.5	.5	.5	22.5

=== College ===
Year	Team	GP	GS	MPG	FG%	3P%	FT%	RPG	APG	SPG	BPG	PPG
2018–19	Baylor	**34**	21	26.8	.395	.351	**.794**	3.1	2.7	1.0	.1	10.2
2019–20	Baylor	30	**30**	**30.4**	.421	.381	.775	3.2	3.1	1.6	.1	16.0
2020–21	Baylor	30	**30**	30.3	**.471**	**.416**	.780	**3.3**	**4.8**	**2.0**	**.4**	**16.7**
Career		94	81	29.1	.431	.384	.782	3.2	3.5	1.5	.2	14.1
