= Tevon Saddler =

American basketball coach (born 1995)

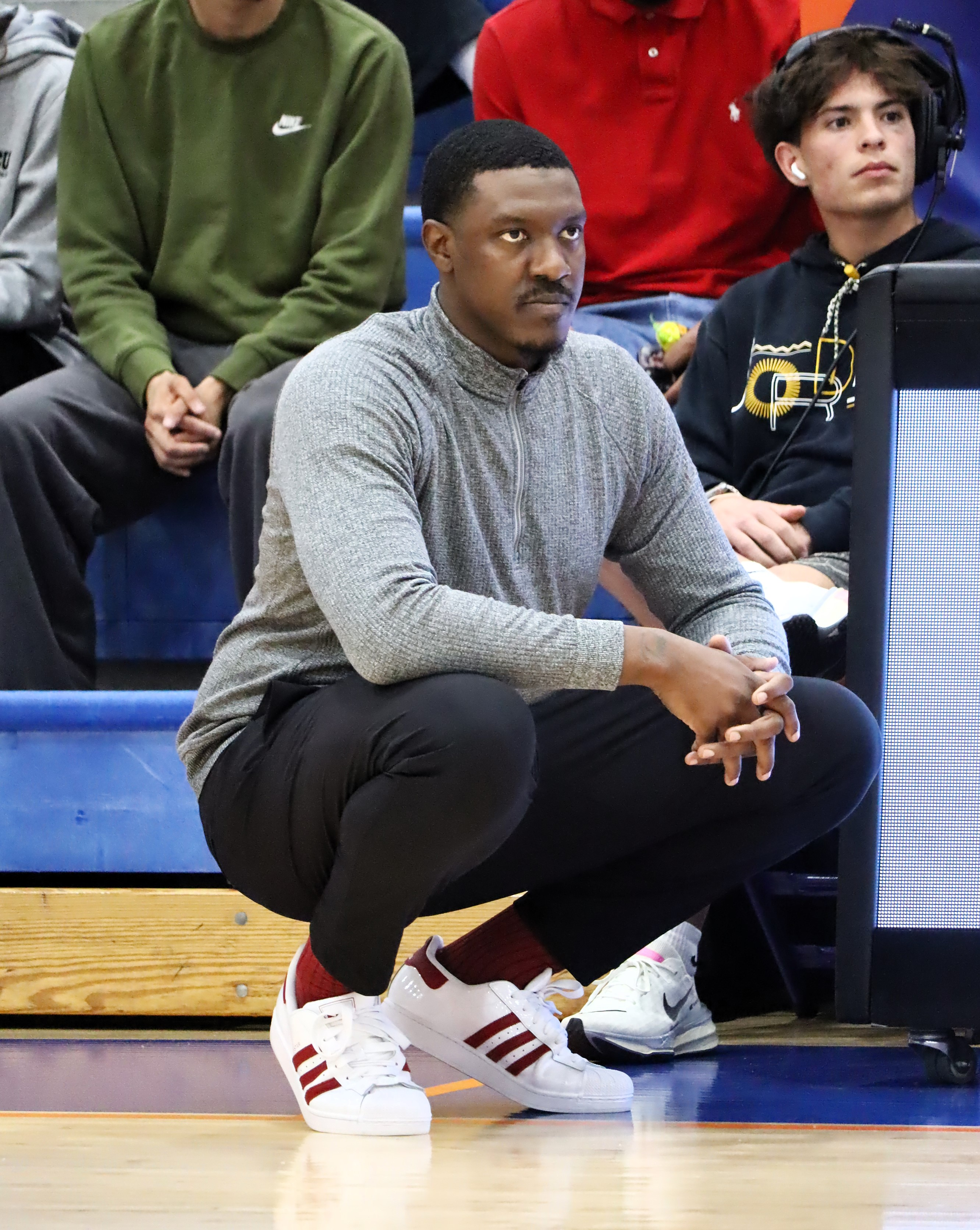
- Saddler with Nicholls in 2026

Capital City Go-Go
- Position: Head Coach
- League: NBA G League

Personal information
- Born: February 21, 1995 (age 31) Aberdeen, Maryland, U.S.
- Listed height: 6 ft 6 in (1.98 m)
- Listed weight: 205 lb (93 kg)

Career information
- High school: Saint Frances Academy (Baltimore, Maryland)
- College: UNC Greensboro (2013–2015); Nicholls (2017–2018)
- Coaching career: 2018–present

Career history

Coaching
- 2018–2019: South Alabama (GA)
- 2019–2021: Nichols (director of basketball operations)
- 2021–2022: McNeese (assistant)
- 2022–2023: Maryland (director of player personnel)
- 2023–2026: Nicholls
- 2026–present: Capital City Go-Go

Career highlights
- As player: Third-team All-SoCon (2015); SoCon Freshman of the Year (2014)

Tevon Saddler (born February 21, 1995) is an American basketball coach who is currently the head coach of the Capital City Go-Go in the NBA G League. He previously served as the head coach of the Nicholls Colonels men's basketball team.

== Playing career ==
Saddler started his college basketball career at UNC Greensboro where he was named Southern Conference Freshman of the Year as well as to the All-Freshman team. A year later, he was a third-team all-conference selection. Saddler transferred to Nicholls to play his final season of eligibility and was named a second-team all-Southland Conference selection while also leading the team in rebounding.

In his career, he played in 92 games starting in 88, averaging 13.8 points, 5 rebounds and 3.2 assists per game.

== Coaching career ==
=== Assistant coach (2018–2023) ===
Saddler began his coaching career as a graduate assistant at South Alabama under his former college coach Richie Riley before returning to Nicholls State as the director of basketball operations from 2019 to 2021 under Austin Claunch. He had a one-season stint as an assistant coach at McNeese before joining the coaching staff at Maryland as the director of player personnel.

=== Nicholls (2023–2026) ===
On April 20, 2023, Saddler was named the head coach at Nicholls after Claunch departed to become an assistant coach at Alabama.

=== Capital City Go-Go (2026–present) ===
On June 25, 2026, the Washington Wizards hired Saddler to be the head coach of their G League affiliate, the Capital City Go-Go.

== Head coaching record ==
=== NCAA Division I ===
Record table
Season	Team	Overall	Conference	Standing	Postseason
Nicholls Colonels (Southland) (2023–2026)
2023–24	Nicholls	20–14	13–5	3rd	
2024–25	Nicholls	20–13	13–7	3rd	
2025–26	Nicholls	14–19	12–10	T-5th	
Nicholls:		54–46 (.540)	38–22 (.633)		
Total:		54–46 (.540)			
National champion Postseason invitational champion Conference regular season champion Conference regular season and conference tournament champion Division regular season champion Division regular season and conference tournament champion Conference tournament champion
