= Riverside Academy (Louisiana) =

Private school in Reserve, Louisiana

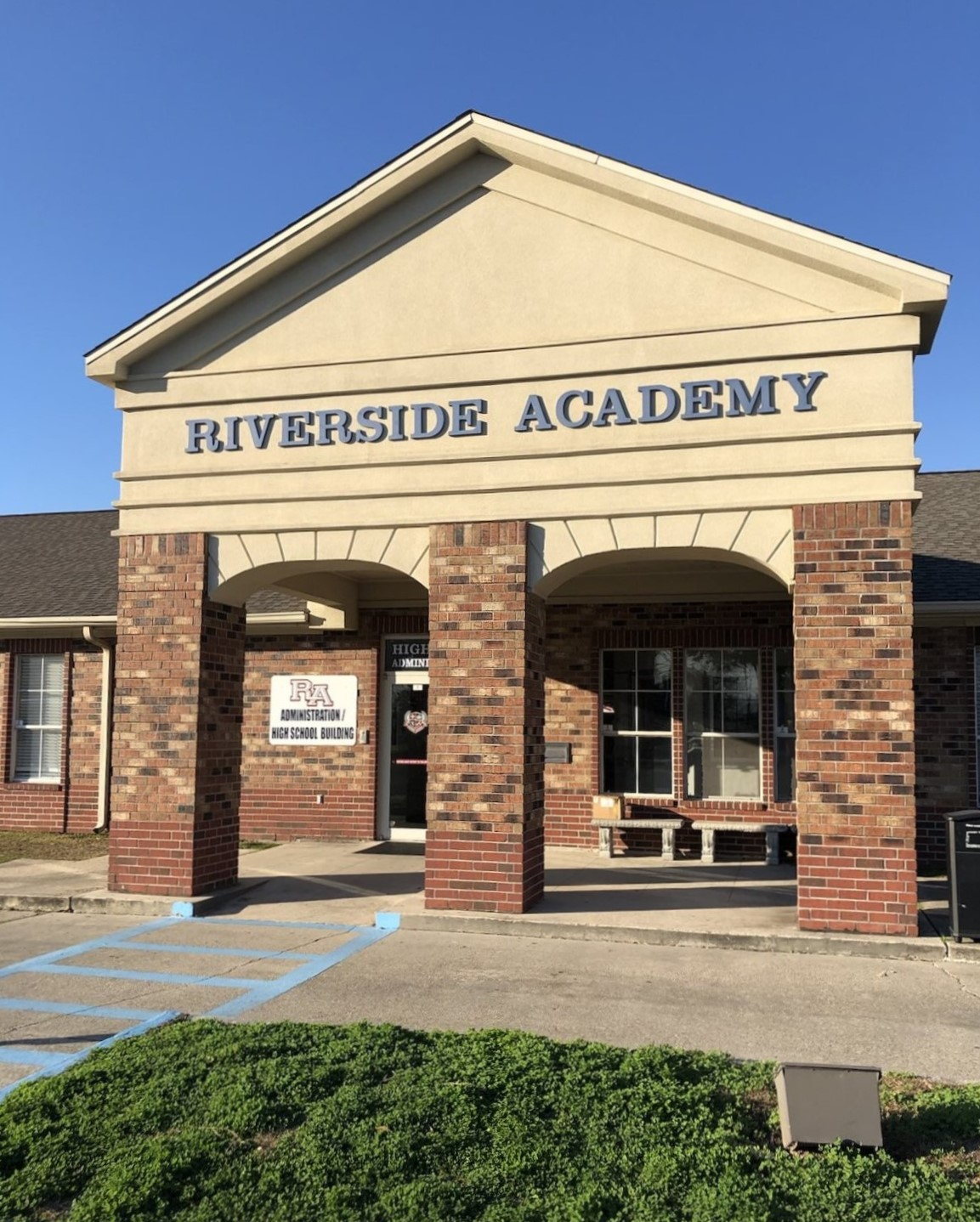

Location
- 332 Railroad Ave. Reserve, Louisiana 70084; United States; 30°03′45″N 90°33′40″W

Information
- Type: Private school
- Opened: 1970
- Grades: Pre K to 12
- Colors: Navy blue, Red and White
- Team name: Rebels
- Rival: St. Charles Catholic Comets
- Website: http://www.riversideacademy.com/

Riverside Academy is a Pre K–12 private school in Reserve, Louisiana in St. John the Baptist Parish, Louisiana. The school opened in 1970.

== Athletics ==
Riverside Academy athletics competes in the LHSAA. The school had previously competed in the Louisiana Independent School Association (LISA).

State Championships
Football championships

- (2) LHSAA Football State Championships: 2016, 2025
- (8) LISA Football State Championships: 1972, 1973, 1975, 1980, 1983, 1984, 1985, 1986

Baseball championships

- (2) LHSAA Baseball State Championships: 2006, 2017

== Notable alumni ==
- Rico Gathers (2012), NFL tight end
- Jared Butler (2018), NBA point guard
- Gage Larvadain (2021), NFL wide receiver
