= Jordan Poole =

American basketball player (born 1999)

- Poole with the Washington Wizards in 2024

No. 3 – New Orleans Pelicans
- Position: Shooting guard / point guard
- League: NBA

Personal information
- Born: June 19, 1999 (age 27) Milwaukee, Wisconsin, U.S.
- Listed height: 6 ft 4 in (1.93 m)
- Listed weight: 200 lb (91 kg)

Career information
- High school: Rufus King (Milwaukee, Wisconsin); La Lumiere School (La Porte, Indiana)
- College: Michigan (2017–2019)
- NBA draft: 2019: 1st round, 28th overall pick
- Drafted by: Golden State Warriors
- Playing career: 2019–present

Career history
- 2019–2021: Santa Cruz Warriors
- 2019–2023: Golden State Warriors
- 2023–2025: Washington Wizards
- 2025–present: New Orleans Pelicans

Career highlights
- NBA champion (2022); All-NBA G League Third Team (2021)
- Stats at NBA.com
- Stats at Basketball Reference

Jordan Anthony Poole (born June 19, 1999) is an American professional basketball player for the New Orleans Pelicans of the National Basketball Association (NBA). He played college basketball for the Michigan Wolverines. At Michigan, he was a member of the 2017–18 team that won the 2018 Big Ten tournament and advanced to that season's national championship game.

Nicknamed "Poole Party", Poole was drafted by the Golden State Warriors in the first round of the 2019 NBA draft. He received assignments for two seasons in the G-League before becoming an integral part of the Warriors rotation starting in 2021. He led the NBA in free throw percentage for the 2021–22 NBA season and won an NBA championship with the Warriors the same season. After four seasons with the Warriors, Poole was traded to the Washington Wizards in 2023, and subsequently to the New Orleans Pelicans in the summer of 2025.

== High school career ==
As a freshman at Rufus King High School in Wisconsin, Poole once made a three-point shot to tie a game in the closing seconds after coming off the bench. Poole visited Illinois, Wisconsin, Indiana, Drake and Marquette as a blue chip high school basketball recruit. Then, he visited Michigan for the September 26 football game between the 2015 Wolverines and BYU, receiving an offer that weekend. He returned to campus on October 17 for the rivalry game against Michigan State. On October 23, 2015, four-star recruit Poole became the first commitment for the Class of 2017 after a home gym visit from head coach John Beilein and assistant coach LaVall Jordan and multiple Michigan campus visits. Poole had several competing offers including Illinois, Indiana, Nebraska, Memphis, Marquette, Virginia Tech and Auburn. At the time of his commitment, he was the 2nd-ranked overall prospect and the 1st-ranked shooting guard in the national class of 2017. As a junior, Poole was a 2016 WBCA All-State Boys Basketball first team selection.

On July 1, 2016, Poole announced that he would transfer from Rufus King to La Lumiere School in Indiana for his senior year, where he would experience a campus lifestyle, play a schedule with several ESPN broadcasts, and be teamed up with then-unsigned class of 2017 prospects Brian Bowen and Jeremiah Tilmon. By the time Poole signed his letter of intent to play college basketball for Michigan as part of a three-scholarship player incoming class with Isaiah Livers and Eli Brooks on November 11, 2016, he was the 90th-ranked overall prospect. Poole was a member of the 2017 Dick's National High School Champion La Lumiere team. In the Dick's National Championship game, Poole posted 13 points, three steals, three rebounds and four assists, and shot 3–7 on his three-point shots. The 13 points included a shot clock buzzer beater in the closing seconds of the third quarter. La Lumiere, which included 2017 McDonald's All-Americans Bowen and Jaren Jackson Jr., defeated perennial power Montverde Academy, who was led by Canadian sophomore R. J. Barrett. La Lumiere had lost the 2016 Dick's National Championship game prior to Poole's arrival.

== College career ==
=== Freshman season ===
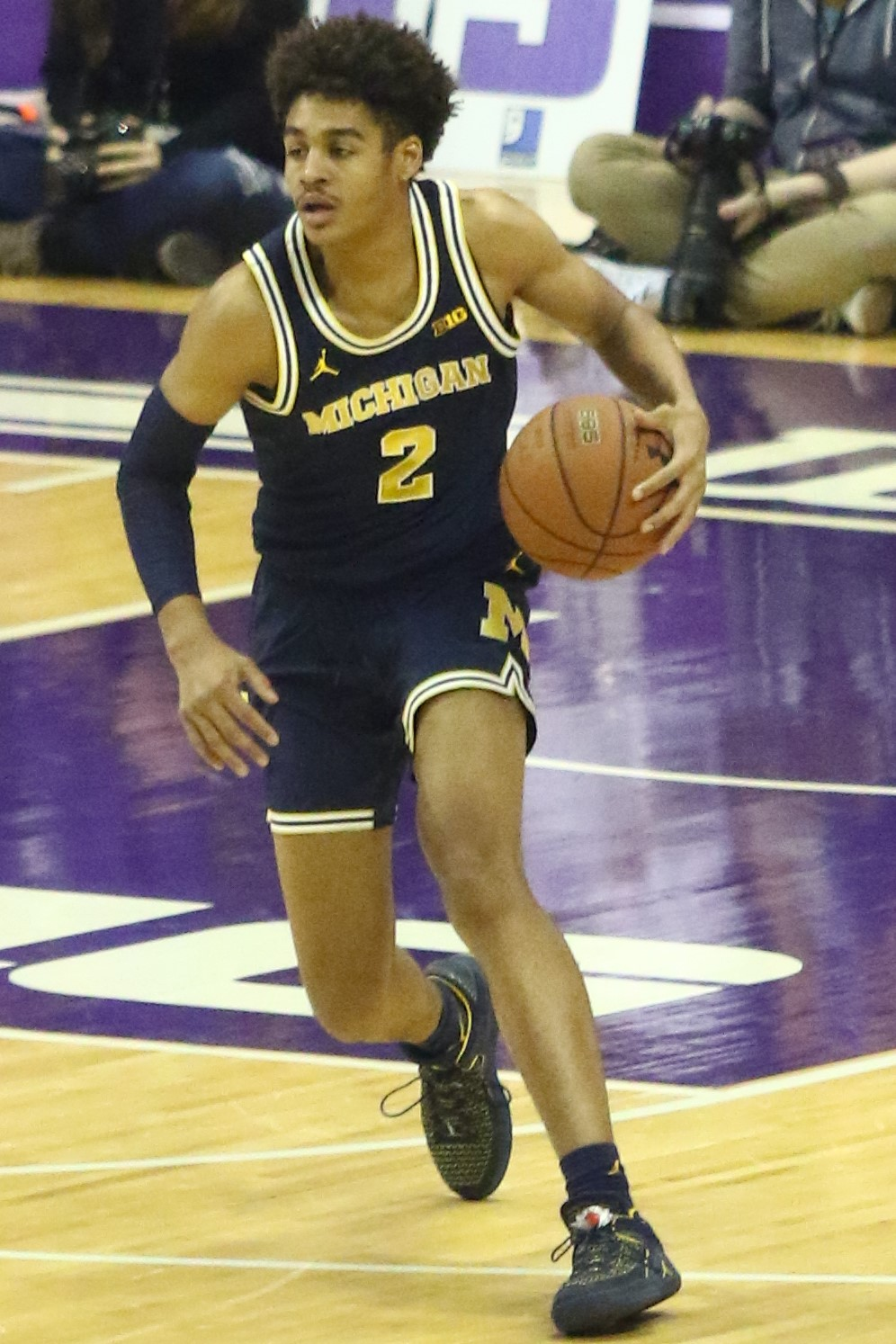
Poole for the 2017–18 Wolverines

On December 2, Michigan defeated Indiana 69–55 in its 2017–18 Big Ten conference season opener with Poole leading the way with a team- and then career-high 19 points in his Big Ten debut. On January 15, Michigan defeated Maryland 68–67. After trailing by 14 points in the first half and 10 points at halftime, Michigan was trailing by seven points in the second half when they made seven consecutive three-point shots, including three by Poole, whose 11 points made him one of only two double digit scorers for Michigan in the game. For the February 3 contest against Minnesota, the Maize Rage (Michigan's student section) held a "Poole party" in the stands, but Poole missed all four of his field goal attempts. Poole finished the regular season with three straight double digit scoring efforts, making nine of 12 three-point shots against (#8 AP Poll/#9 Coaches Poll) Ohio State on February 18, Penn State on February 21, and Maryland on February 24. On March 4, a victory over (#8 AP Poll/#8 Coaches Poll) Purdue gave Michigan its second consecutive Big Ten tournament championship, even though Poole slumped during the four-game run, missing all nine of his three-point shots.

On March 17, 2018, Michigan defeated (#21 AP Poll/#19 Coaches Poll) Houston 64–63 in the second round of the 2018 NCAA tournament, following a game-winning buzzer beater three-point shot by Poole, giving Michigan its fourth Sweet 16 in six years. The shot was described as nearly identical to the buzzer beater he had made a year earlier in the Dick's National Championship game.

=== Sophomore season ===
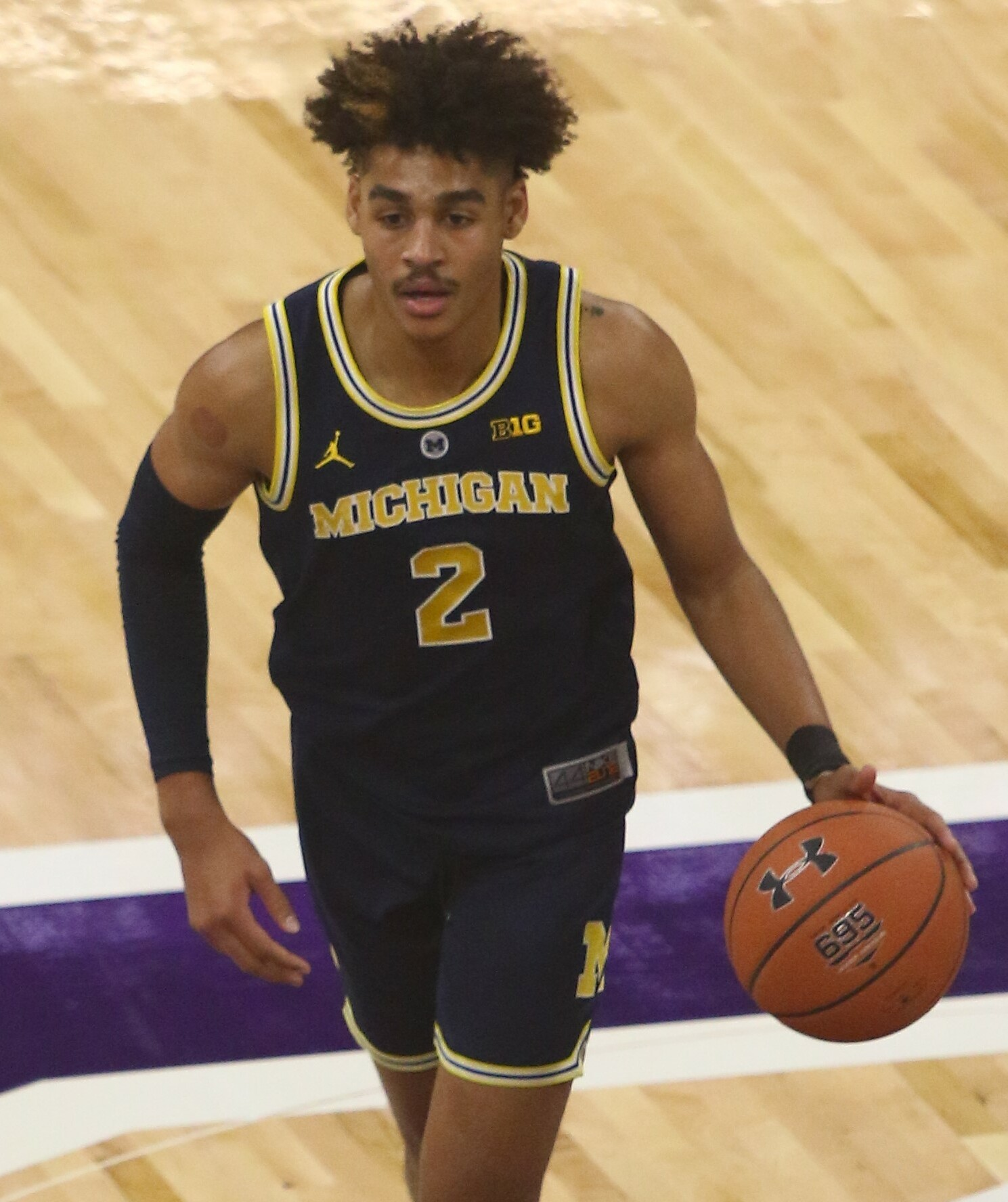
Poole for the 2018–19 Wolverines

On November 17, 2018, Poole's career-high 22 points helped Michigan defeat George Washington 84–61. On November 28, Michigan defeated (#11/#13) North Carolina 84–67 in the ACC–Big Ten Challenge, as Poole contributed 18 points, including 5-for-8 three point shooting. On December 1, Michigan defeated (#19/#18) Purdue 76–57 in its Big Ten Conference season opener. Michigan was led by Poole with a game-high 21 points, including 5-for-5 from three-point range. On December 3, Poole was recognized as Big Ten Player of the Week for his performance against these two ranked teams. On December 8, Michigan defeated South Carolina 89–78. Michigan was led by Poole with a career-high 26 points. On December 30, Michigan defeated Binghamton 74–52. Poole posted 18 points, including a career-high six three-pointers. On January 13, the 2018–19 Wolverines team defeated Northwestern to establish a school record for best start at 17–0 and tied the school's record 17-game win streak. Following the season, he was a 2019 All-Big Ten honorable mention selection (coaches and media). On March 23, Michigan defeated Florida 64–49 in the second round of the 2019 NCAA Division I men's basketball tournament. Michigan was led by Poole with a game-high 19 points earning its third consecutive the Sweet 16 appearance and second consecutive one keyed by Poole. Following the season, on April 9, 2019, Poole (along with teammates Iggy Brazdeikis and Charles Matthews) declared for the 2019 NBA draft with the intention of hiring agents.

== Professional career ==
=== Golden State Warriors (2019–2023) ===
==== Early years (2019–2021) ====
On June 20, 2019, Poole was drafted 28th overall in the first round of the 2019 NBA draft by the Golden State Warriors. His guaranteed contract was $6.2 million over three years. On July 11, the Warriors signed Poole to his rookie scale contract. In the Warriors opening game of the 2019–20 season on October 24, Poole made his NBA debut, coming off the bench in a 122–141 loss to the Los Angeles Clippers with five points, two rebounds, two assists and a steal. On October 29, he made his first NBA start for the Warriors against the Pelicans scoring 13 points in the Warriors first win of the season. In December 2019, Poole was assigned to the Santa Cruz Warriors of the NBA G-League. In his first game there, he scored 23 points against the Stockton Kings. In his second game, he made five three pointers in a loss against the Texas Legends, scoring 31 points and posting five rebounds, four assists and three steals. In January 2020, Poole returned to the Golden State Warriors lineup. On January 18, Poole scored a then career-high 21 points in a 109–95 win against the Orlando Magic.

Starting shooting guard Klay Thompson would miss the entire season for the 2020–21 Warriors. On March 4, 2021, Poole set a then career-high 26 points in a 120–98 loss to the Phoenix Suns. On May 14, Poole posted a then career-high 38 points in a 125–122 win over the New Orleans Pelicans. The Warriors used several shooting guards during the season and closed the 2020–21 NBA season with Kent Bazemore, Mychal Mulder, Damion Lee, and Kelly Oubre Jr. all in the picture.

==== Breakout season and first championship (2021–2023) ====
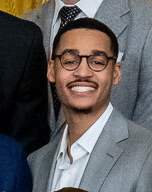
Poole in 2023

Poole beat out Otto Porter Jr. and Lee for the 2021–22 Warriors' starting shooting guard spot, while Thompson continued to recover. On November 21, 2021, Poole scored 33 points on a career-high eight three-pointers made in a 119–104 win over the Toronto Raptors. With Thompson's return to the starting lineup in January 2022, Poole began to play point guard in a three-guard system, alongside both Thompson and Stephen Curry. With Curry sidelined late in the season, Poole scored 20 or more points in 18 of the final 20 games. Seventeen of those 20+ performances came in consecutive games. The 17-game 20+-point streak ended on April 7, against the Los Angeles Lakers on a night where Poole scored 19 points and set a career-high with 11 assists to contribute to a 128–112 victory. Poole (92.5%) edged out Curry (92.3%) as the NBA annual free throw percentage leader. It was the first time in 45 years that teammates finished in the top two positions. On the final day he went 4-for-4 to hold on to the lead, ending the season with 28 consecutive free throws made. Poole was not one of the three official finalists (Ja Morant, Darius Garland, and Dejounte Murray) for the NBA Most Improved Player Award, and finished fourth in the balloting (although he finished third in first place votes). On April 16, in Game 1 of the first round of the 2022 NBA playoffs, he started and scored 30 points in a 123–107 win over the Denver Nuggets. The game was Poole's first career postseason appearance. The Warriors won the NBA Finals against the Boston Celtics, earning Poole his first NBA championship. He performed admirably in the playoffs, averaging 17.0 points while shooting 50.8% overall and 39% on 3-pointers.

During a team practice on October 5, 2022, Poole and teammate Draymond Green got into an altercation, resulting in Green striking Poole. TMZ published a leaked video on October 7, showing the punch but not what led to the incident. On October 9, Green publicly apologized for the incident and announced that he would spend a few days away from the team. On October 12, the team fined Green for the altercation as opposed to the suspected suspension. On October 15, 2022, Poole signed a four-year contract extension worth $123 million and $17 million in incentives, with $5 million categorized as LTBE with the Warriors. On November 14, Poole scored 36 points on 13-of-20 shooting from the field in a 132–95 win over the San Antonio Spurs. On December 18, Poole scored a career-high 43 points in a 126–110 win over the Toronto Raptors. On January 25, 2023, Poole scored 21 points, 5 rebounds, and 7 assists, as well as a game-winning layup in a 122–120 win over the Memphis Grizzlies, a game which oversaw Curry being ejected following Poole's missed three-pointer. On February 6, Poole put up 21 points alongside a career-high 12 assists in a 141–114 win over the Oklahoma City Thunder. Golden State was eliminated from the 2023 playoffs by the Lakers, losing in the conference semifinals in six games. Poole's role fluctuated throughout the season, as he went in and out of the starting lineup, starting 47 of 95 games. In 43 regular season starts, he averaged 24.6 points and 4.6 assists. Overall, his minutes dropped from 30 per game in the regular season to 21.8 in the playoffs, and his scoring fell from 20.4 in the regular season to 10.3 in the postseason, when he made just 34.1% of his overall shots and 25.4% of 3-point attempts. After the season, Kerr said the Warriors were not a championship team due to a lack of trust on the team, in part due to Green's punching Poole, and Green blamed their early playoff exit on his punch.

=== Washington Wizards (2023–2025) ===
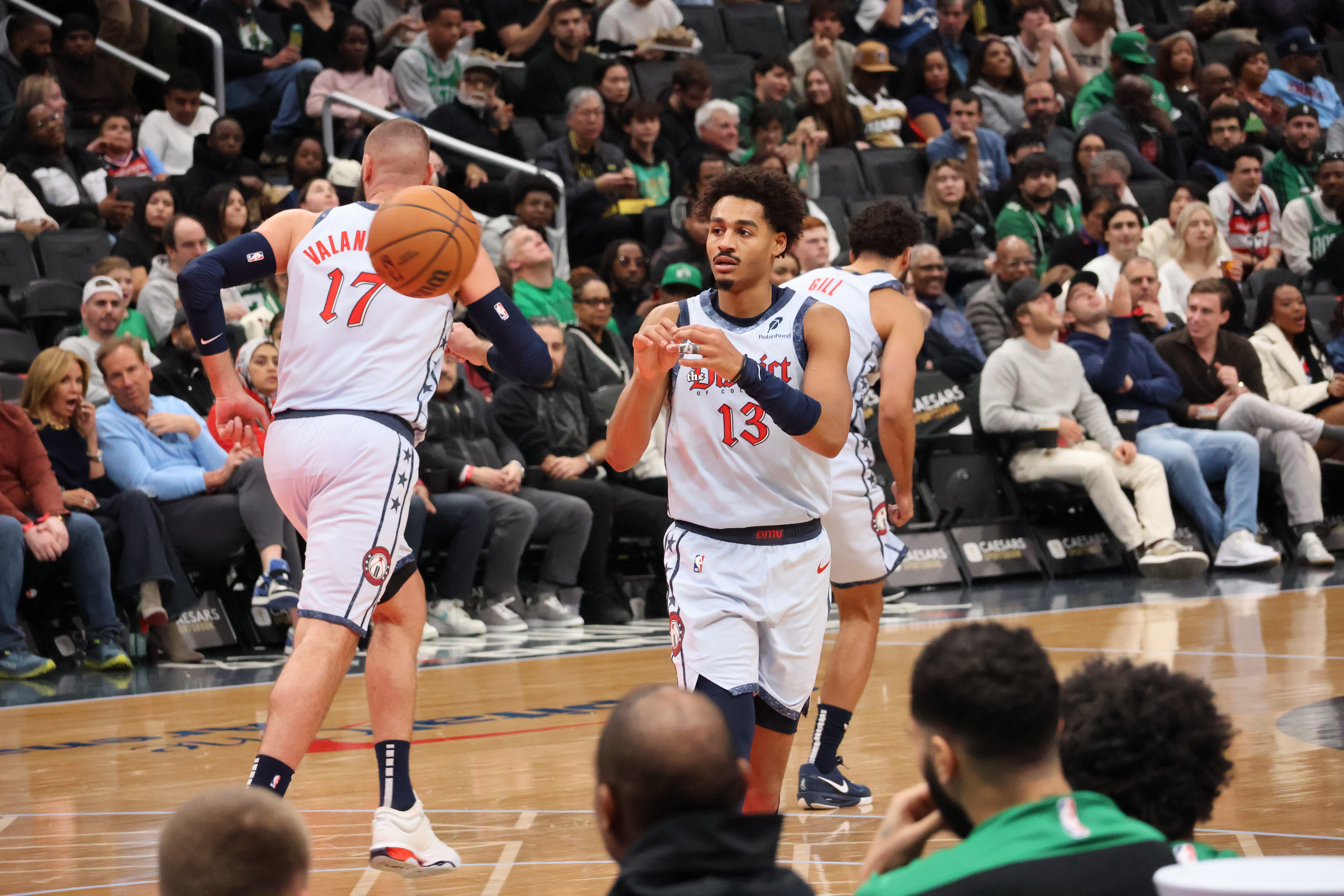
Poole receiving the inbounding ball against the Boston Celtics in 2024.

On July 6, 2023, the Warriors traded Poole, Patrick Baldwin Jr., Ryan Rollins and draft picks to the Washington Wizards in exchange for Chris Paul. Poole made his Wizards debut on October 25, logging 18 points and five assists in a 145–120 loss to the Indiana Pacers. For the 2023–24 season Poole scored a high of 38 points against the Brooklyn Nets on March 27, 2024. For the 2024–25 season, he was moved to point guard. Poole posted his first 40-point night as a Wizard on November 14, 2024 when he scored 42 against San Antonio, but it was not enough to offset Victor Wembanyama's career-high 50-point night. On January 18, 2025, Poole made his second appearance at the Chase Center, the home court of the Warriors, as a visiting player since the trade. He scored 38 points, including 8–15 shooting on three point shots and his 900th career three pointer, but the Wizards lost to the Warriors by a 122–114 margin. However, Poole became the first member of the 2019 NBA draft class to reach 900. On February 7, Poole put up a career-high 45 points in a 134–124 loss to the Cleveland Cavaliers. On March 31, in a game against the Miami Heat, Poole surpassed Bradley Beal's previous record of 223 for the most three-pointers made in a season in Wizards franchise history, eventually finishing the season with 235.

=== New Orleans Pelicans (2025–present) ===
On July 6, 2025, Poole, Saddiq Bey, and the draft rights to Micah Peavy (40th pick in the 2025 NBA draft) were traded to the New Orleans Pelicans in a three-team trade involving the Houston Rockets who received two second-round picks while the Wizards acquired CJ McCollum, Kelly Olynyk, Cam Whitmore, and a future second-round pick. Poole made his debut for the Pelicans on October 22, 2025, where he registered 17 points and two assists across 31 minutes of game time in a 128-122 loss to the Grizzlies. Following his debut, Poole's Pelicans career was plagued with injuries, as he missed the Pelicans' second official win of the season against the Dallas Mavericks with a sore knee injury. Then, on November 7, 2025, Poole suffered a quad strain injury, which sidelined him for a few weeks. On November 25, 2025, he was cleared to come back and play on the court. After his return, Poole continued to struggle with efficiency after coming off a career-high season in scoring with the Wizards. Due to his lack of performance, Pelicans head coach James Borrego decided to bench Poole and take him out of the starting rotation, with the player even receiving DNPs after failing to be efficient throughout the second half of the season. Entering the final stretch, and in the last three games of the season. Poole scored a high of 34 points, paired with four assists, two rebounds, and a block and steal in 32 minutes of playtime after receiving DNPs the previous three games. The game after, and in his last game of the season, Poole scored 11 points, paired with three assists, rebounds, and one steal in 29 minutes of playtime. Following the game, Poole finished his disgruntled season, plagued with inefficiencies and injuries, averaging 13.4 points, 2 rebounds, and 3.1 assists, appearing only in 39 games, which marked it as his lowest scoring and playing season since the 2020-21 NBA season with the Warriors.

== Player profile ==
Although criticized when entering the league for his lack of polish, Poole developed into a dynamic and efficient scorer throughout his tenure with the Warriors. In addition to his shooting ability, Poole is a prolific finisher at the rim, frequently slashing to the basket using his ball-handling skills and speed while being a proficient mid-range shot creator. Poole's improvement in his all-around game has led to him becoming a capable passer, averaging a career-high 4.0 assists per game during his third season in a combo guard role. His combination of abilities has drawn comparisons to former Warriors teammate Stephen Curry, with some basketball media writers referring to him as the "third Splash Brother".

== Career statistics ==
Legend
GP	Games played	GS	Games started	MPG	Minutes per game
FG%	Field goal percentage	3P%	3-point field goal percentage	FT%	Free throw percentage
RPG	Rebounds per game	APG	Assists per game	SPG	Steals per game
BPG	Blocks per game	PPG	Points per game	**Bold**	Career high
†	Won an NBA championship	*	Led the league

=== NBA ===
==== Regular season ====
Year	Team	GP	GS	MPG	FG%	3P%	FT%	RPG	APG	SPG	BPG	PPG
2019–20	Golden State	57	14	22.3	.333	.279	.798	2.1	2.4	.6	.2	8.8
2020–21	Golden State	51	7	19.4	.432	.351	.882	1.8	1.9	.5	.2	12.0
2021–22†	Golden State	76	51	30.0	**.448**	.364	**.925***	**3.4**	4.0	.8	.3	18.5
2022–23	Golden State	**82**	43	30.0	.430	.336	.870	2.7	**4.5**	.8	.3	20.4
2023–24	Washington	78	66	**30.1**	.413	.326	.877	2.7	4.4	1.1	.3	17.4
2024–25	Washington	68	**68**	29.4	.432	**.378**	.883	3.0	**4.5**	**1.3**	**.4**	**20.5**
2025–26	New Orleans	39	8	23.9	.372	.333	.860	2.0	3.1	.6	**.4**	13.4
Career		451	257	27.2	.418	.344	.877	2.6	3.7	.8	.3	16.6

==== Playoffs ====
Year	Team	GP	GS	MPG	FG%	3P%	FT%	RPG	APG	SPG	BPG	PPG
2022†	Golden State	**22**	**5**	**27.5**	**.508**	**.391**	**.915**	**2.8**	**3.8**	**.8**	**.4**	**17.0**
2023	Golden State	13	4	21.8	.341	.254	.765	2.2	3.5	**.8**	.2	10.3
Career		35	9	25.4	.450	.346	.867	2.6	3.7	.8	.3	14.5

=== College ===
Year	Team	GP	GS	MPG	FG%	3P%	FT%	RPG	APG	SPG	BPG	PPG
2017–18	Michigan	**38**	0	12.5	.429	**.370**	.827	1.4	.6	.5	**.2**	6.1
2018–19	Michigan	37	**37**	**33.1**	**.436**	.369	**.833**	**3.0**	**2.2**	**1.1**	**.2**	**12.1**
Career		75	37	22.7	.434	.370	.831	2.2	1.4	.8	.2	9.4

== Personal life ==
Poole is the son of Monet and Anthony Poole. Poole has an older sister who attended Marquette. He also has a younger sister.

== See also ==
- List of NBA career free throw percentage leaders
- List of NBA annual free throw percentage leaders
