= Gage Larvadain =

American football player (born 2003)

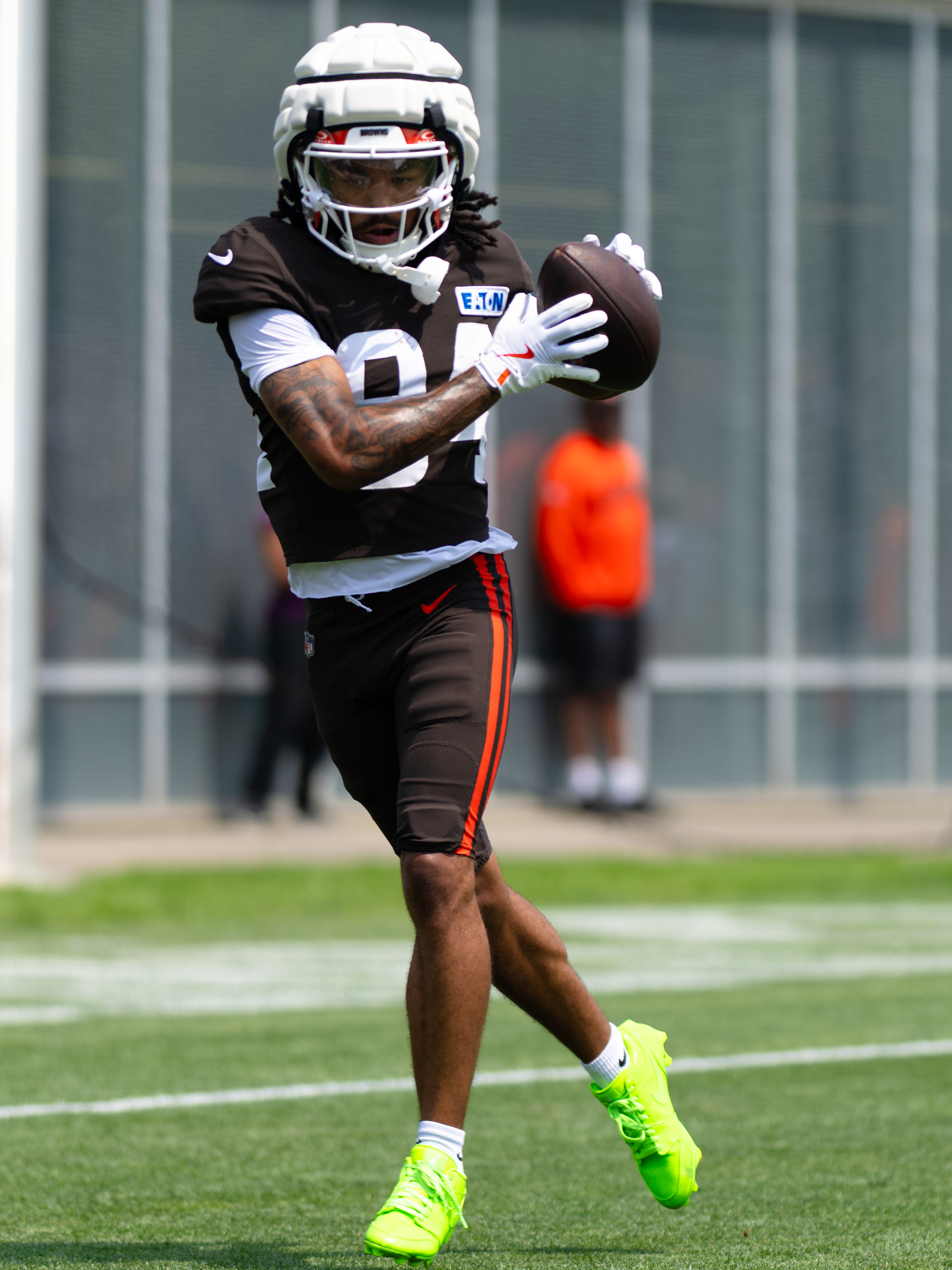
- Larvadain with the Cleveland Browns in 2026

No. 82 – Baltimore Ravens
- Positions: Wide receiver, punt returner
- Roster status: Practice squad

Personal information
- Born: January 3, 2003 (age 23); Donaldsonville, Louisiana, U.S.
- Listed height: 5 ft 8 in (1.73 m)
- Listed weight: 171 lb (78 kg)

Career information
- High school: Riverside Academy (Reserve, Louisiana)
- College: Southeastern Louisiana (2021–2022); Miami (OH) (2023); South Carolina (2024)
- NFL draft: 2025: undrafted

Career history
- Cleveland Browns (2025)*; Baltimore Ravens (2026–present)*
- * Offseason or practice squad member only

Awards and highlights
- First-team All-Southland (2021); SLC Freshman of the Year (2021)

Career NFL statistics as of 2025
- Receptions: 7
- Receiving yards: 71
- Return yards: 167
- Stats at Pro Football Reference

Dillan Gage Larvadain (/ˈlɑːrvədæn/ LAR-və-dan; born January 3, 2003) is an American professional football wide receiver and punt returner for the Baltimore Ravens of the National Football League (NFL). He played college football for the Southeastern Louisiana Lions, Miami RedHawks, and South Carolina Gamecocks.

== Early life ==
Larvadain grew up in Donaldsonville, Louisiana and attended Riverside Academy in Reserve, Louisiana, where he lettered in football and basketball. He played as a quarterback, wide receiver and a defensive back during his high school career. He accounted a total of 2,400 yards and 33 touchdowns during his career and was named the High School Football Player of the Year by Crescent City Sports, NASH ICON 106.1 FM and Friday Night Football. He would commit to play college football at Southeastern Louisiana University. He would also join their basketball team as a walk-on.

== College career ==
=== Southeastern Louisiana ===
During Larvadain's true freshman season in 2021, he played in all 13 games and started six of them, finishing the season with 37 receptions for 521 yards and five touchdowns. He was named on the All-Southland Conference as both a wide receiver and a kick returner and was also named the Southland Conference Freshman of the Year, being the first Lion to win the award since 2008.

During his basketball career, he played in 11 games where he averaged 1.6 points per game, hit 46.2% of his shots and grabbed nine rebounds.

During the 2022 season, he played in all 13 games and started six of them, finishing the season with 59 receptions for 731 yards and two touchdowns. He also averaged 25.1 yards on 20 kickoff returns and rushed for 74 yards on 15 carries.

On December 12, 2022, Larvadain announced that he would enter the transfer portal.

=== Miami (OH) ===
On January 14, 2023, Larvadain announced that he would transfer to Miami.

During the 2023 season, he played in and started 10 games, finishing the season with 42 receptions for 679 yards and six touchdowns. He averaged 16.2 yards per catch, rushed five times for 59 yards and added five punt returns for 55 yards.

On December 23, 2023, Larvadain announced that he would enter the transfer portal for the second time.

=== South Carolina ===
On January 5, 2024, Larvadain announced that he would transfer to South Carolina.

During the 2024 season, he played in all 13 games and started nine of them, finishing the season with 19 receptions for 223 yards and a touchdown. He also rushed twice for 15 yards and had one kick return for six yards.

== Professional career ==
Pre-draft measurables
Height	Weight	Arm length	Hand span	Wingspan	40-yard dash	10-yard split	20-yard split	20-yard shuttle	Three-cone drill	Vertical jump	Broad jump
5 ft 8 3/8 in (1.74 m)	171 lb (78 kg)	30 in (0.76 m)	9 5/8 in (0.24 m)	5 ft 11 1/2 in (1.82 m)	4.45 s	1.52 s	2.58 s	4.32 s	7.20 s	38.5 in (0.98 m)	10 ft 0 in (3.05 m)
All values from Pro Day

=== Cleveland Browns ===
Larvadain signed with the Cleveland Browns as an undrafted free agent on May 11, 2025. He was waived on September 13 and re-signed to the practice squad three days later. On September 30, Larvadain was re-signed to the active roster.

On August 30, 2026, Larvadain was waived by the Browns as a part of final roster cuts.

=== Baltimore Ravens ===
On September 15, 2026, Larvadain signed to the Baltimore Ravens' practice squad.
