= Michael Winger =

American basketball executive (born 1980)

Washington Wizards
- Position: President
- League: NBA

Personal information
- Born: Cleveland, Ohio, U.S.

Career information
- College: Miami University

Michael Winger (born 1980) is an American basketball executive who is the president of Monumental Basketball, which manages the Washington Wizards of the NBA, the Washington Mystics of the WNBA, and the Capital City Go-Go of the NBA G-League. He is a former executive of the Oklahoma City Thunder (2010–2017) and general manager of the Los Angeles Clippers (2017–2023).

== Early life and career ==
Winger attended Miami University and the University of Toledo College of Law. As a visiting student at the University of Maryland's Francis King Carey School of Law his last year of school, Winger served as an apprentice to sports agent Ronald M. Shapiro. Winger supported Ron in the launch of SNI's (Shapiro Negotiations Institute) Sports Division and helped with research for Ron's book, Bullies, Tyrants, & Impossible People: How to Beat Them Without Joining Them.

== Executive career ==
=== Oklahoma City Thunder (2010–2017) ===
In 2005 and following law school and his work with Shapiro, Winger became the director of basketball operations and team counsel for the Cleveland Cavaliers under Danny Ferry, who was general manager at the time. During his time with the Cavaliers, the team reached the Eastern Conference Finals twice, winning one of those series to advance to the NBA Finals in 2007. Winger worked with LeBron James, Shaquille O'Neal, Mo Williams, and Ben Wallace while with the Cavaliers. In 2010, Winger became the assistant general manager and team counsel for the Oklahoma City Thunder under GM Sam Presti.

During his tenure with the Oklahoma City Thunder, the team reached four Western Conference Finals which resulted in one NBA Finals appearance in 2012. Winger worked with three future NBA MVPs in Kevin Durant, James Harden, and Russell Westbrook. Winger had many different responsibilities while with the Thunder, including selecting players in the draft, executing trades, and retaining and signing existing players and free agents. Some notable draft selections, include Mitch McGary, Reggie Jackson, Steven Adams, Andre Roberson, and Cameron Payne.

=== Los Angeles Clippers (2017–2023) ===
On August 23, 2017, Winger was hired as the general manager of the Los Angeles Clippers. The team reached the 2021 Western Conference Finals and achieved a winning record in every season under his tenure.

=== Monumental Basketball (2023–present) ===
On May 24, 2023, Winger was hired as president of Monumental Basketball, a division of Monumental Sports & Entertainment that manages the NBA's Washington Wizards as well as the Washington Mystics of the WNBA and the Capital City Go-Go of the NBA G-League.
