= Capital City Go-Go =

American professional basketball team of the NBA G League

- Conference: Eastern
- League: NBA G League
- Founded: 2018
- History: Capital City Go-Go; 2018–present
- Arena: CareFirst Arena (2018–present)
- Location: Washington, D.C.
- Team colors: Navy blue, red, white
- President: Michael Winger
- Team manager: John Wall
- Head coach: Tevon Saddler
- Ownership: Monumental Sports & Entertainment
- Affiliation: Washington Wizards
- Website: capitalcity.gleague.nba.com

The Capital City Go-Go are an American professional basketball team in the NBA G League based in Washington, D.C.. They are affiliated with the Washington Wizards, and play their home games at the CareFirst Arena. The team is owned by Monumental Sports & Entertainment.

== History ==
In December 2017, the Washington Wizards unveiled the Capital City Go-Go's name and released their logo. The team's name alludes to the go-go music genre that emerged in Washington, D.C., in the mid-1960s to late 1970s. On August 7, 2018, the Washington Wizards named Pops Mensah-Bonsu as general manager and Jarell Christian as head coach. After one season, Christian joined the Wizards as an assistant coach and was replaced by Ryan Richman. Following the pandemic-curtailed 2019–20 season, Pops Mensah-Bonsu left the team. The Go-Go were one of several teams to opt out of the abbreviated 2020–21 bubble season in Orlando, and the Wizards came to an agreement to loan players to the Erie BayHawks. The Wizards then assigned Amber Nichols as Capital City's general manager and to work alongside their players with the BayHawks, becoming the second woman to hold that position in the G League after the College Park Skyhawks' Tori Miller.

== Season by season ==
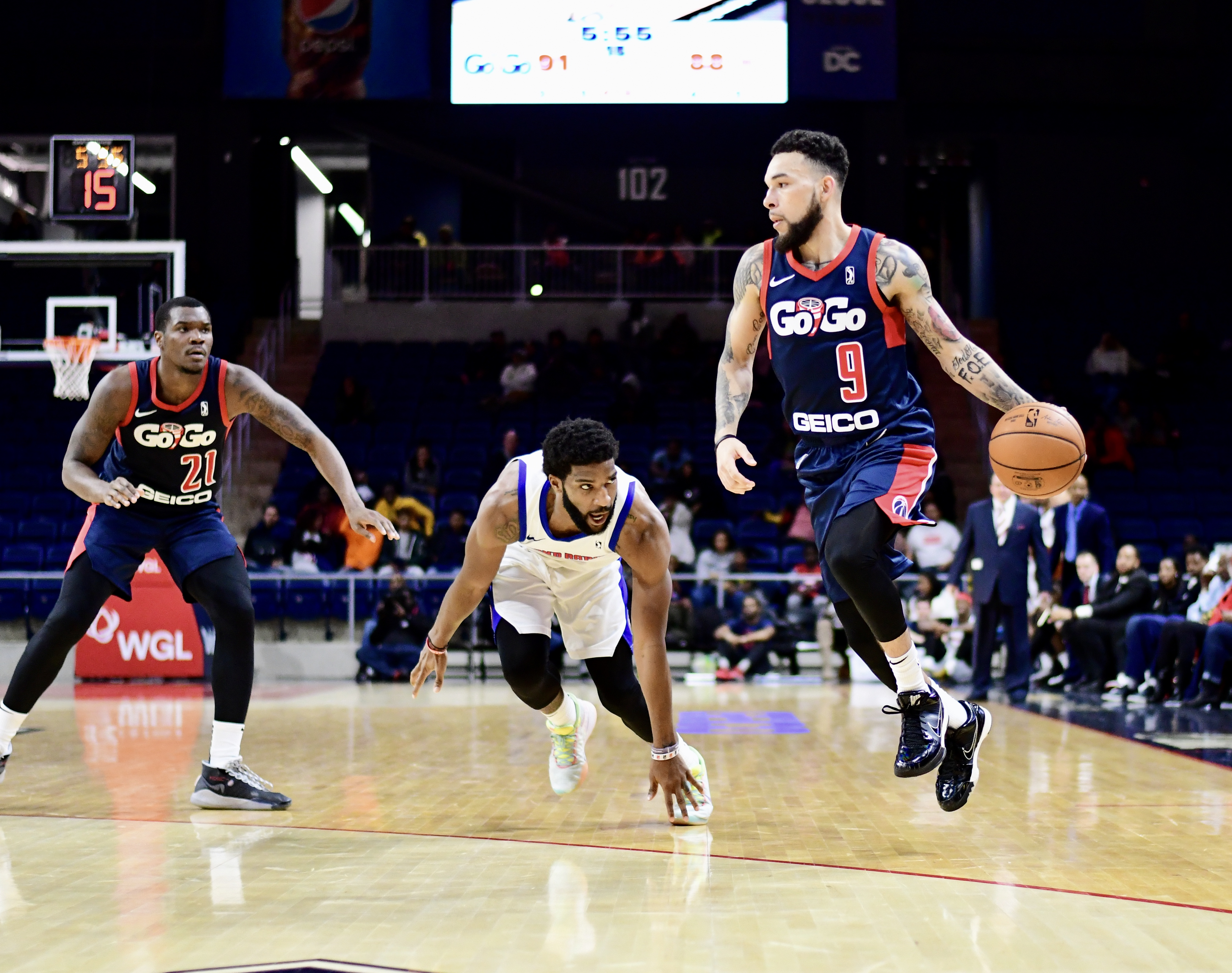
Chris Chiozza playing for the Go-Go in 2019

Season	Division	Conference	Regular season				Postseason results
Season	Division	Conference	Finish	Wins	Losses	Win %	Postseason results
Capital City Go-Go
2018–19	Southeast	Eastern	2nd	25	25	.500	
2019–20	Southeast	Eastern	2nd	22	21	.512	Season cancelled by COVID-19 pandemic
2020–21	Opted out of single-site season						
2021–22	–	Eastern	4th	21	10	.677	Won Conference Quarterfinal (College Park) 131–122; Lost Conference Semifinal (Raptors 905) 126–131 (OT)
2022–23	–	Eastern	3rd	19	13	.594	Won Conference Quarterfinal (Fort Wayne) 101–87; Lost Conference Semifinal (Delaware) 99–104
2023–24	–	Eastern	4th	20	14	.588	Lost Conference Quarterfinal (Long Island) 118–120
2024–25	–	Eastern	6th	20	14	.588	Lost Conference Quarterfinal (Maine) 95–115
Regular season record				127	97	.567	
Playoff record				2	4	.333	

== Current roster ==
Capital City Go-Go roster
Players

Pos.	No.	Player	Height	Weight	DOB	From
G	26	Reece Beekman	6 ft 2 in (1.88 m)	190 lb (86 kg)	2001-10-08	Virginia
G	00	Trae Hannibal	6 ft 2 in (1.88 m)	220 lb (100 kg)	2001-02-13	LSU
G	2	Nolan Hickman	6 ft 2 in (1.88 m)	190 lb (86 kg)	2003-05-07	Gonzaga
F/C	17	Skal Labissière	6 ft 10 in (2.08 m)	235 lb (107 kg)	1996-03-18	Kentucky
F	7	Chris Livingston	6 ft 6 in (1.98 m)	220 lb (100 kg)	2003-10-15	Kentucky
F	9	Chris Mantis	6 ft 7 in (2.01 m)	185 lb (84 kg)	2002-10-05	Maine
C	–	Felix Okpara (TW)	6 ft 11 in (2.11 m)	235 lb (107 kg)	2004-04-20	Tennessee
F	5	Jamir Watkins (TW)	6 ft 6 in (1.98 m)	210 lb (95 kg)	2001-07-06	Florida State

Coaches
Head coach
- Cody Toppert
Assistant(s)
- Pete Fusilero
- Ashton Gibbs
- TC Swirsky
- Jason Thompson

Legend
- (DP) Unsigned draft pick
- (FA) Free agent
- (S) Suspended
- (P) Prospects
- (NBA) On assignment from NBA affiliate
- (TW) Two-way affiliate player
- Injured

Roster
Updated: March 4, 2026

== Head coaches ==
#	Head coach	Term	Regular season				Playoffs				Achievements
#	Head coach	Term	G	W	L	Win%	G	W	L	Win%	Achievements
1	Jarell Christian	2018–2019	50	25	25	.500	—	—	—	—	
2	Ryan Richman	2019–2020	43	22	21	.512	—	—	—	—	
3	Mike Williams	2021–2023	63	40	23	.635	4	2	2	.500	
4	Cody Toppert	2023–2026	–	–	–	–	–	–	–	–	
5	Tevon Saddler	2026–present	–	–	–	–	–	–	–	–	

== NBA affiliates ==
- Washington Wizards (2018–present)

== See also ==
- Sports in Washington, D.C.
