= Anthony Gill (basketball) =

American basketball player (born 1992)

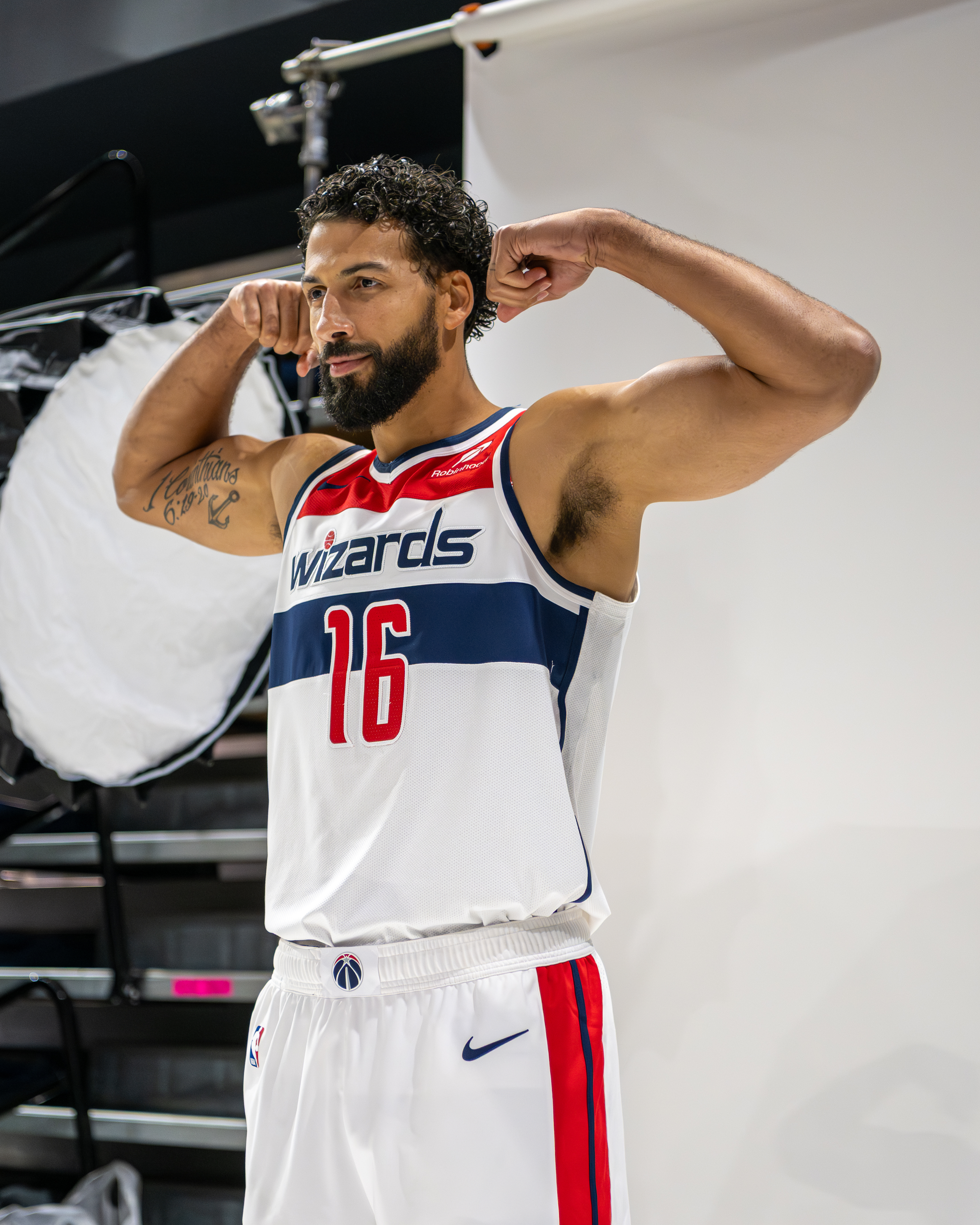
- Gill with the Washington Wizards in 2025

No. 16 – Washington Wizards
- Position: Power forward
- League: NBA

Personal information
- Born: October 17, 1992 (age 34) High Point, North Carolina, U.S.
- Listed height: 6 ft 7 in (2.01 m)
- Listed weight: 230 lb (104 kg)

Career information
- High school: Charlotte Christian (Charlotte, North Carolina)
- College: South Carolina (2011–2012); Virginia (2013–2016)
- NBA draft: 2016: undrafted
- Playing career: 2016–present

Career history
- 2016–2017: Yeşilgiresun
- 2017–2020: Khimki
- 2020–present: Washington Wizards

Career highlights
- AP Honorable mention All-American (2015); 2× Third-team All-ACC (2015, 2016)
- Stats at NBA.com
- Stats at Basketball Reference

Anthony Remeral Gill II (born October 17, 1992) is an American professional basketball player for the Washington Wizards of the National Basketball Association (NBA). Gill played college basketball for the South Carolina Gamecocks and Virginia Cavaliers.

== College career ==
=== Recruiting ===
College recruiting
Name	Hometown	School	Height	Weight	Commit date
Anthony Gill; PF	Charlotte, NC	Charlotte Christian School	6 ft 8 in (2.03 m)	212 lb (96 kg)	Oct 27, 2009
Anthony Gill; PF	Recruit ratings: Scout: Rivals: 247Sports: ESPN:				
Overall recruit ranking: Scout: 91 Rivals: 144 247Sports: 95 ESPN: 88
Note: In many cases, Scout, Rivals, 247Sports, On3, and ESPN may conflict in their listings of height and weight.; In these cases, the average was taken. ESPN grades are on a 100-point scale.; Sources: "South Carolina 2011 Basketball Commitments". Rivals.; "2011 South Carolina Commits". Scout.; "ESPN". ESPN.; "Scout.com Team Recruiting Rankings". Scout.; "2011 Team Ranking". Rivals.

=== South Carolina ===
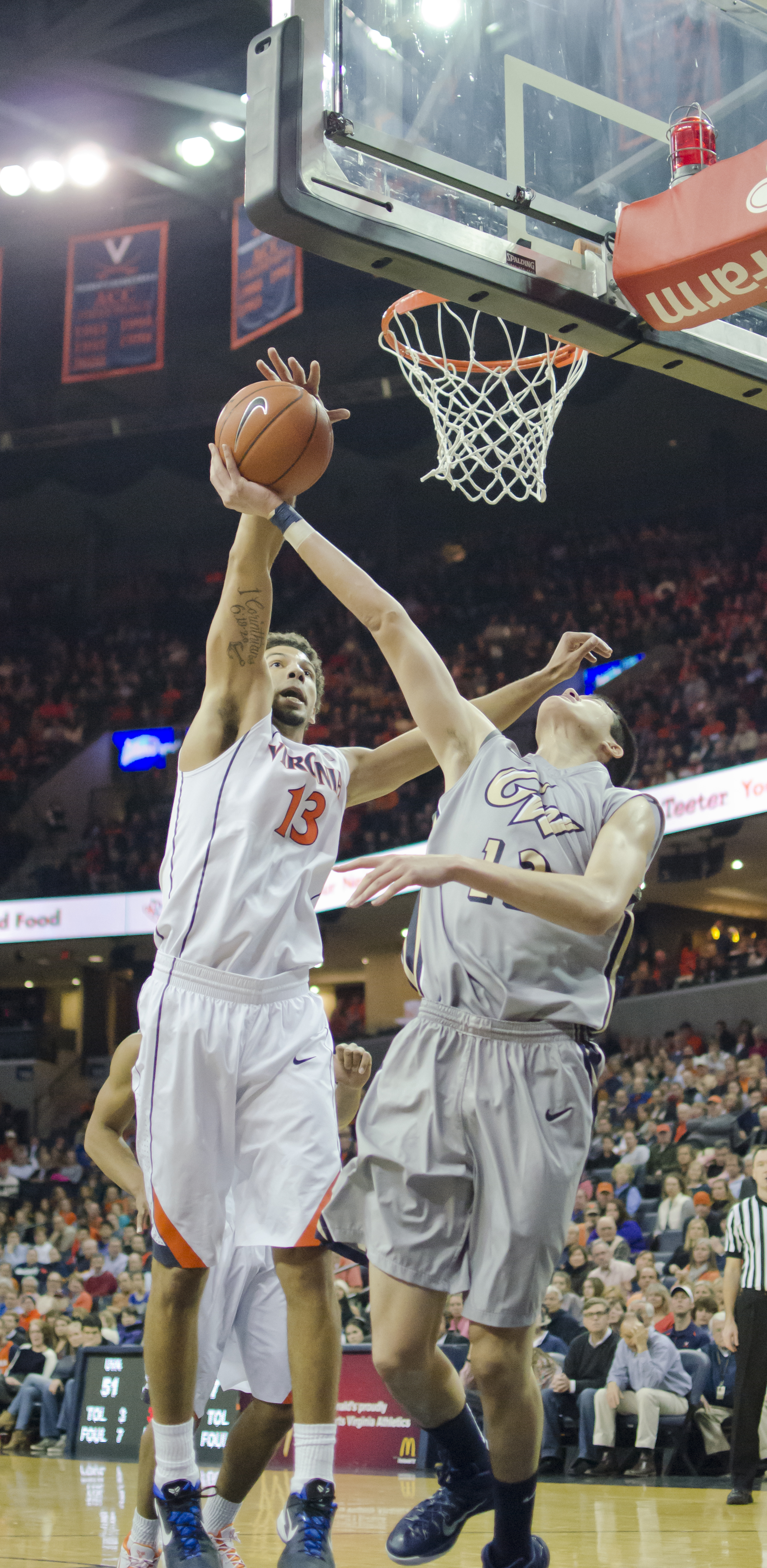
Gill blocking a shot in November 2014

Gill played in all 31 of South Carolina's games and started in 26 of them. Following the firing of head coach Darrin Horn, Gill was given permission to transfer from South Carolina.

=== Virginia ===
Gill received interest from Ohio State and North Carolina but ultimately elected to transfer to the University of Virginia. After sitting out his redshirt season, Gill played an important role off the bench for the Cavaliers during a season where the team won both the ACC regular season and tournament titles. He injured his ankle during Virginia's loss to Michigan State in the Sweet Sixteen round of the 2014 NCAA tournament. During his junior season, Gill led the Cavaliers in rebounding with 6.5 rebounds per game and ranked third in scoring with 11.6 points per game. Following the season, he was named third-team All-ACC and voted onto the coaches' All-ACC Defensive Team.

== Professional career ==
=== Yeşilgiresun Belediye (2016–2017) ===
After going undrafted in the 2016 NBA draft, Gill signed with MHP Riesen Ludwigsburg in Germany. However, he left the team prior to the season's start after failing a medical exam on August 23, 2016. Gill then signed with Yeşilgiresun Belediye of the Turkish Basketbol Süper Ligi.

=== Khimki (2017–2020) ===
On June 24, 2017, Gill signed a contract to play for the Charlotte Hornets during the 2017 NBA Summer League. He later signed with Khimki of the VTB United League. On August 3, 2020, Gill parted ways with the team.

=== Washington Wizards (2020–present) ===
On December 1, 2020, Gill signed a two-year contract with the Washington Wizards. He made 26 appearances (four starts) for Washington during the 2020–21 NBA season, averaging 3.1 points, 2.0 rebounds, and 0.4 assists. Gill played in 44 contests for the Wizards during the 2021–22 NBA season, averaging 4.1 points, 1.9 rebounds, and 0.6 assists.

On July 1, 2022, Gill signed another two-year contract with the Wizards. He made 59 appearances (eight starts) for the team during the 2022–23 NBA season, averaging 3.3 points, 1.7 rebounds, and 0.6 assists.

Gill made 50 appearances for Washington, including three starts, during the 2023–24 NBA season, averaging 3.8 points, 1.9 rebounds, and 0.7 assists. On July 25, 2024, Gill re-signed with Washington. He played in 51 games for the Wizards during the 2024–25 NBA season, posting averages of 2.5 points, 1.3 rebounds, and 0.3 assists. Gill was waived by Washington on June 29, 2025.

On August 7, 2025, Gill re-signed with the Wizards on a one-year contract. He made 55 appearances (including eight starts) for Washington during the 2025–26 season, recording averages of 5.8 points, 2.9 rebounds, and 1.3 assists.

On September 15, 2026, Gill re-signed with the Wizards.

== Career statistics ==
Legend
GP	Games played	GS	Games started	MPG	Minutes per game
FG%	Field-goal percentage	3P%	3-point field-goal percentage	FT%	Free-throw percentage
RPG	Rebounds per game	APG	Assists per game	SPG	Steals per game
BPG	Blocks per game	PPG	Points per game	PIR	Performance index rating
**Bold**	Career high

=== NBA ===
==== Regular season ====
Year	Team	GP	GS	MPG	FG%	3P%	FT%	RPG	APG	SPG	BPG	PPG
2020–21	Washington	26	4	8.4	.500	.292	**.813**	2.0	.4	.4	.2	3.1
2021–22	Washington	44	0	10.5	.569	**.538**	.808	1.9	.6	.1	.3	4.1
2022–23	Washington	**59**	**8**	10.6	.538	.138	.731	1.7	.6	.1	.2	3.3
2023–24	Washington	50	3	9.3	.469	.244	.806	1.9	.7	.3	.2	3.8
2024–25	Washington	51	0	7.8	.489	.323	.660	1.3	.3	.2	.0	2.5
2025–26	Washington	55	**8**	**17.3**	**.628**	.354	.739	**2.9**	**1.3**	**.6**	**.4**	**5.8**
Career		285	23	10.9	.545	.312	.749	1.9	.7	.3	.2	3.8

==== Playoffs ====
Year	Team	GP	GS	MPG	FG%	3P%	FT%	RPG	APG	SPG	BPG	PPG
2021	Washington	4	0	8.3	.000	.000	–	1.0	.0	.0	.0	.0
Career		4	0	8.3	.000	.000	–	1.0	.0	.0	.0	.0

=== EuroLeague ===
Year	Team	GP	GS	MPG	FG%	3P%	FT%	RPG	APG	SPG	BPG	PPG	PIR
2017–18	Khimki	**32**	**31**	25.9	**.588**	**.478**	.743	**4.5**	1.0	.5	**.6**	**11.8**	**13.1**
2018–19	Khimki	13	11	**26.6**	.546	.222	**.767**	3.5	**1.6**	**.8**	**.6**	11.5	12.1
Career		45	42	26.1	.574	.390	.755	4.2	1.2	.6	.6	11.7	12.8

=== College statistics ===
Year	Team	GP	GS	MPG	FG%	3P%	FT%	RPG	APG	SPG	BPG	PPG
2011–12	South Carolina	31	26	25.3	.453	.393	.646	4.7	**1.1**	.5	.3	7.6
2013–14	Virginia	34	6	19.8	**.587**	–	.627	4.0	.4	.3	.5	8.6
2014–15	Virginia	34	30	25.3	.582	.000	.677	**6.5**	.9	**.9**	.5	11.6
2015–16	Virginia	**37**	**37**	**28.0**	.580	**1.000**	**.746**	6.1	.8	.6	**.6**	**13.8**
Career		139	99	24.6	.556	.419	.680	5.3	.8	.6	.5	10.5

== Personal life ==
Gill was born October 17, 1992, to Sandi Summers and Anthony Gill. He has a brother named Daxton and two sisters named Nichole and Kaytlyn. Gill was born with nerve damage, resulting in the temporary paralysis of the right side of his face.

Although rarely a starter in the NBA, Gill is known as a consummate teammate and positive influence on the team, particularly the younger players. "You could write a book on how great of a teammate Anthony Gill is", Wizards coach Brian Keefe said in January, 2025.

Off the court, Gill has a reputation of being a prankster. He often makes up stories during interviews, such as owning a two-headed Siamese cat and being a magician in his free time.
