= Jamir Watkins =

American basketball player (born 2001)

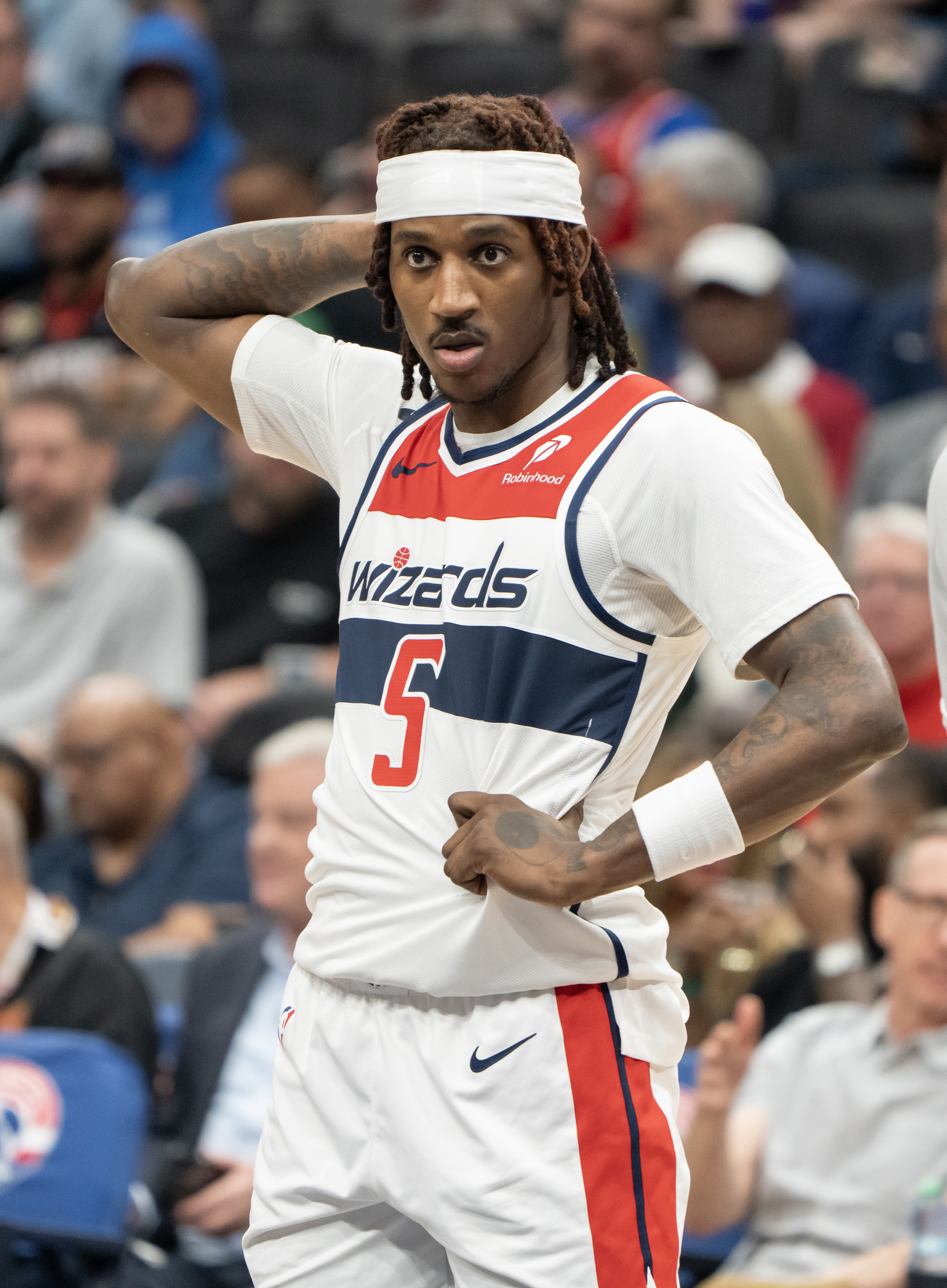
- Watkins with the Washington Wizards in 2026

No. 5 – Washington Wizards
- Position: Small forward
- League: NBA

Personal information
- Born: July 6, 2001 (age 25) Trenton, New Jersey, U.S.
- Listed height: 6 ft 5 in (1.96 m)
- Listed weight: 210 lb (95 kg)

Career information
- High school: Trenton Catholic (Trenton, New Jersey)
- College: VCU (2020–2023); Florida State (2023–2025)
- NBA draft: 2025: 2nd round, 43rd overall pick
- Drafted by: Utah Jazz
- Playing career: 2025–present

Career history
- 2025–present: Washington Wizards
- 2025–present: →Capital City Go-Go

Career highlights
- Second-team All-ACC (2025)
- Stats at NBA.com
- Stats at Basketball Reference

Jamir Kamal Watkins (born July 6, 2001) is an American professional basketball player for the Washington Wizards of the National Basketball Association (NBA), on a two-way contract with the Capital City Go-Go of the NBA G League. He played college basketball for the VCU Rams and Florida State Seminoles.

== Early life ==
Raised in Trenton, New Jersey, Watkins attended Trenton Catholic Academy in Mercer County, New Jersey. Coming out of high school, Watkins was rated as a three-star recruit and committed to playing college basketball for VCU.

== College career ==
=== VCU ===
As a freshman in 2020–21, Watkins appeared in 26 games with two starts, where he averaged 7.2 points, 2.6 rebounds, 0.7 assists and 0.9 steals per game. He missed the entire 2021–22 season due to a knee injury. On December 17, 2022, Watkins scored 22 points versus the Northern Illinois. On January 20, 2023, he scored a game-high 15 points, while also adding ten rebounds, two assists, two steals and two blocks, in a win over Richmond. In the first round of the A-10 conference tournament, Watkins scored 11 points, while also tallying six rebounds, two assists and three blocks. In the 2022–23 season, he averaged 9.5 points, 5.4 rebounds, 1.5 assists and 1.2 steals per game. After the season, Watkins entered his name into the NCAA transfer portal.

=== Florida State ===
Watkins transferred to play for the Florida State Seminoles. On January 23, 2024, he notched 27 points and 11 rebounds in a win over Syracuse. In the second round of the 2024 ACC tournament, Watkins scored a career-high 34 points with 11 rebounds and four steals. During the 2023–24 season, he started all 33 games for Florida State, where he averaged 15.6 points a game, six rebounds and 2.8 assists, while also adding 64 steals and 26 blocks, en route to being named an all-ACC honorable mention. After the season, Watkins declared for the 2024 NBA draft, but eventually withdrew and returned to Florida State. On November 9, 2024, Watkins scored 30 points, while also adding six rebounds and an assist in a win over Rice. On December 14, 2024, he dropped 29 points, four rebounds, five assists, a steal and a block in a win over Tulane.

== Professional career ==
Watkins was drafted by the Washington Wizards via the Utah Jazz in the second round of the 2025 NBA draft with the 43rd overall pick. He was subsequently signed to a two-way contract by the team. On February 26, 2026, the Wizards signed Watkins to a two-year, standard NBA contract. On April 12, Watkins recorded a career-high 24 points during a 130–117 loss to the Cleveland Cavaliers. He made 50 total appearances (including seven starts) for the Wizards during his rookie campaign, posting averages of 7.4 points, 3.9 rebounds, and 1.3 assists.

On July 1, 2026, Watkins re–signed with Washington on a two–way contract. On July 30, it was announced that Watkins had undergone surgery to repair a torn ACL in his left knee.

== Career statistics ==
Legend
GP	Games played	GS	Games started	MPG	Minutes per game
FG%	Field goal percentage	3P%	3-point field goal percentage	FT%	Free throw percentage
RPG	Rebounds per game	APG	Assists per game	SPG	Steals per game
BPG	Blocks per game	PPG	Points per game	**Bold**	Career high

=== NBA ===
Year	Team	GP	GS	MPG	FG%	3P%	FT%	RPG	APG	SPG	BPG	PPG
2025–26	Washington	50	7	20.6	.446	.297	.695	3.9	1.3	1.1	.5	7.4
Career		50	7	20.6	.446	.297	.695	3.9	1.3	1.1	.5	7.4

=== College ===
Year	Team	GP	GS	MPG	FG%	3P%	FT%	RPG	APG	SPG	BPG	PPG
2020–21	VCU	26	2	18.4	.389	.289	.746	2.6	.7	.9	.2	7.2
2021–22	VCU	Redshirt										
2022–23	VCU	**35**	17	23.5	.413	.340	.721	5.4	1.5	1.2	.7	9.5
2023–24	Florida State	33	**33**	28.1	**.457**	**.344**	**.795**	**6.0**	**2.8**	**1.9**	**.8**	15.6
2024–25	Florida State	32	32	**30.9**	.427	.321	.747	5.7	2.4	1.2	.5	**18.4**
Career		126	84	25.6	.427	.325	.758	5.1	1.9	1.3	.6	12.9
