= Leaky Black =

American basketball player (born 1999)

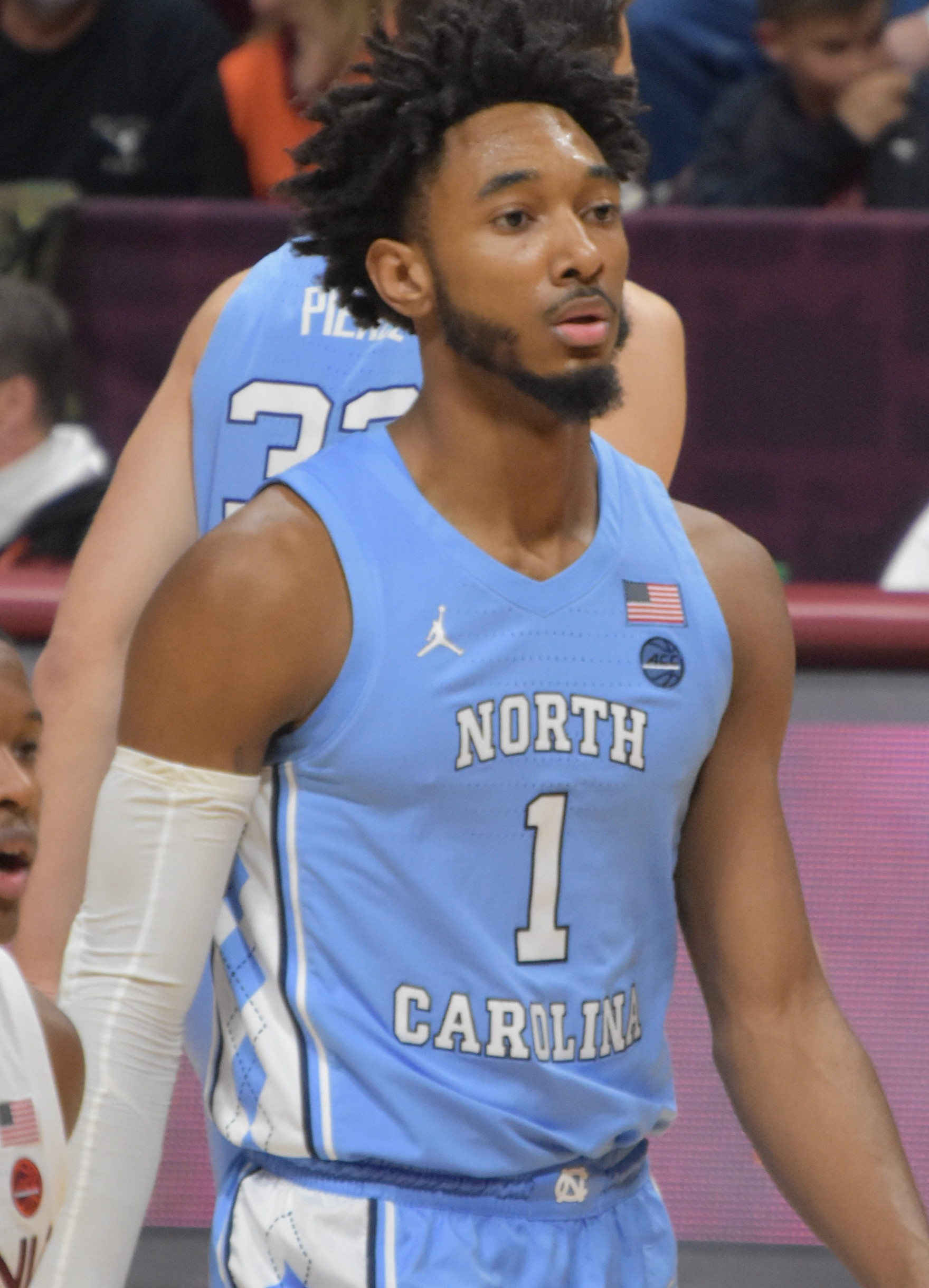
- Black with North Carolina in 2020

No. 19 – Sacramento Kings
- Position: Small forward
- League: NBA

Personal information
- Born: June 14, 1999 (age 27) Concord, North Carolina, U.S.
- Listed height: 6 ft 7 in (2.01 m)
- Listed weight: 209 lb (95 kg)

Career information
- High school: Concord (Concord, North Carolina); Montverde Academy (Montverde, Florida); Cox Mill (Concord, North Carolina)
- College: North Carolina (2018–2023)
- NBA draft: 2023: undrafted
- Playing career: 2023–present

Career history
- 2023–2024: Charlotte Hornets
- 2023–2024: →Greensboro Swarm
- 2024–2026: Capital City Go-Go
- 2026: Washington Wizards
- 2026: →Capital City Go-Go
- 2026–present: Sacramento Kings
- 2026–present: →Stockton Kings

Career highlights
- 2× ACC All-Defensive team (2022, 2023)
- Stats at NBA.com
- Stats at Basketball Reference

Rechon Malik "Leaky" Black (born June 14, 1999) is an American professional basketball player for the Sacramento Kings of the National Basketball Association (NBA), on a two-way contract with the Stockton Kings of the NBA G League. He played college basketball for the North Carolina Tar Heels.

== College career ==
Black, raised in Concord, North Carolina, committed to coach Roy Williams and North Carolina as a high school sophomore. After a shortened freshman campaign due to an ankle injury, Black entered the starting lineup in his sophomore season for the Tar Heels.

As a senior, Black became one of the top defensive players in the ACC, earning conference all-defensive team honors at the close of the regular season. Black was a part of a Tar Heel starting lineup that each averaged big minutes and led the eighth-seeded Tar Heels to an unexpected Final Four berth in the 2022 NCAA tournament. In the semifinal against rival Duke, Black held Duke freshman AJ Griffin to 1–7 shooting for 6 points to help secure the win.

== Professional career ==
=== Charlotte Hornets / Greensboro Swarm (2023–2024) ===
After going undrafted in the 2023 NBA draft, Black signed a two-way contract with the Charlotte Hornets on July 19, 2023. He made 26 appearances (including three starts) for Charlotte during his rookie season, recording averages of 2.7 points, 1.5 rebounds, and 1.8 assists. However, Black was waived by the Hornets on August 1, 2024.

=== Washington Wizards / Capital City Go-Go (2024–2026) ===
On September 29, 2024, Black signed with the Washington Wizards, but was waived on October 12. On October 28, he joined the Capital City Go-Go.

On October 2, 2025, the Wizards added Black to their training camp roster, prior to the 2025–26 season. Black was later released and then re-added to the Go-Go's roster. On February 21, 2026, the Wizards signed Black to a two-way contract. He made 15 appearances (nine starts) for Washington over the remainder of the year, averaging career-highs in points (7.1), rebounds (5.0), assists (1.5), and steals (1.2). Black was waived by the Wizards on July 1.

== Career statistics ==
Legend
GP	Games played	GS	Games started	MPG	Minutes per game
FG%	Field goal percentage	3P%	3-point field goal percentage	FT%	Free throw percentage
RPG	Rebounds per game	APG	Assists per game	SPG	Steals per game
BPG	Blocks per game	PPG	Points per game	**Bold**	Career high

=== NBA ===
Year	Team	GP	GS	MPG	FG%	3P%	FT%	RPG	APG	SPG	BPG	PPG
2023–24	Charlotte	**26**	3	10.9	**.481**	**.450**	.667	1.8	.9	.3	.4	2.7
2025–26	Washington	15	**9**	**28.9**	.388	.345	**.875**	**5.0**	**1.5**	**1.2**	**.5**	**7.1**
Career		41	12	17.5	.419	.373	.739	3.0	1.1	.6	.5	4.3

=== College ===
Year	Team	GP	GS	MPG	FG%	3P%	FT%	RPG	APG	SPG	BPG	PPG
2018–19	North Carolina	23	0	10.3	**.469**	**.417**	.857	2.1	1.2	.6	.2	2.5
2019–20	North Carolina	32	31	29.7	.359	.254	.696	5.0	2.6	**1.3**	**.8**	6.5
2020–21	North Carolina	29	27	27.6	.367	.222	.692	4.9	2.4	1.2	.3	5.6
2021–22	North Carolina	**38**	**38**	29.7	.466	.333	**.868**	4.3	**2.7**	.9	.7	4.9
2022–23	North Carolina	33	33	**32.1**	.411	.326	.702	**4.8**	1.5	**1.3**	**.8**	**7.3**
Career		155	129	26.9	.401	.296	.735	4.7	2.2	1.1	.6	5.5

== Personal life ==
Black has been open about his struggles with anxiety and his coping strategies that have helped him control it. He earned his nickname, which comes from his middle name "Malik", from his grandmother.
