= Southeastern Conference Men's Basketball Rookie of the Year =

SEC Men's Basketball Rookie of the Year
- Awarded for: the most outstanding first-year male basketball player in the Southeastern Conference
- Country: United States
- First award: 1998-present
- Currently held by: Darius Acuff Jr., Arkansas (Freshman); Dailyn Swain, Texas (Newcomer)

The Southeastern Conference (SEC) Men's Basketball Rookie of the Year is an umbrella name for two awards given to the most outstanding basketball player in his first year at a Southeastern Conference school. One award, voted on and presented by SEC coaches, is currently called Freshman of the Year, and is open only to freshmen (i.e., those who are in their first season of college play, which is usually but not always their first year of college). The other award, presented by the Associated Press, is called Newcomer of the Year, and is open to any player in his first season at an SEC school, including those who transferred to SEC schools. (The coaches' award was not always restricted to freshmen, but now is.)

== Key ==
†	Co-Rookies of the Year
*	Awarded a Player of the Year award: the SEC Player of the Year
Italics	Player was not a freshman that season
A	Associated Press selection
C	SEC coaches selection

== Winners ==
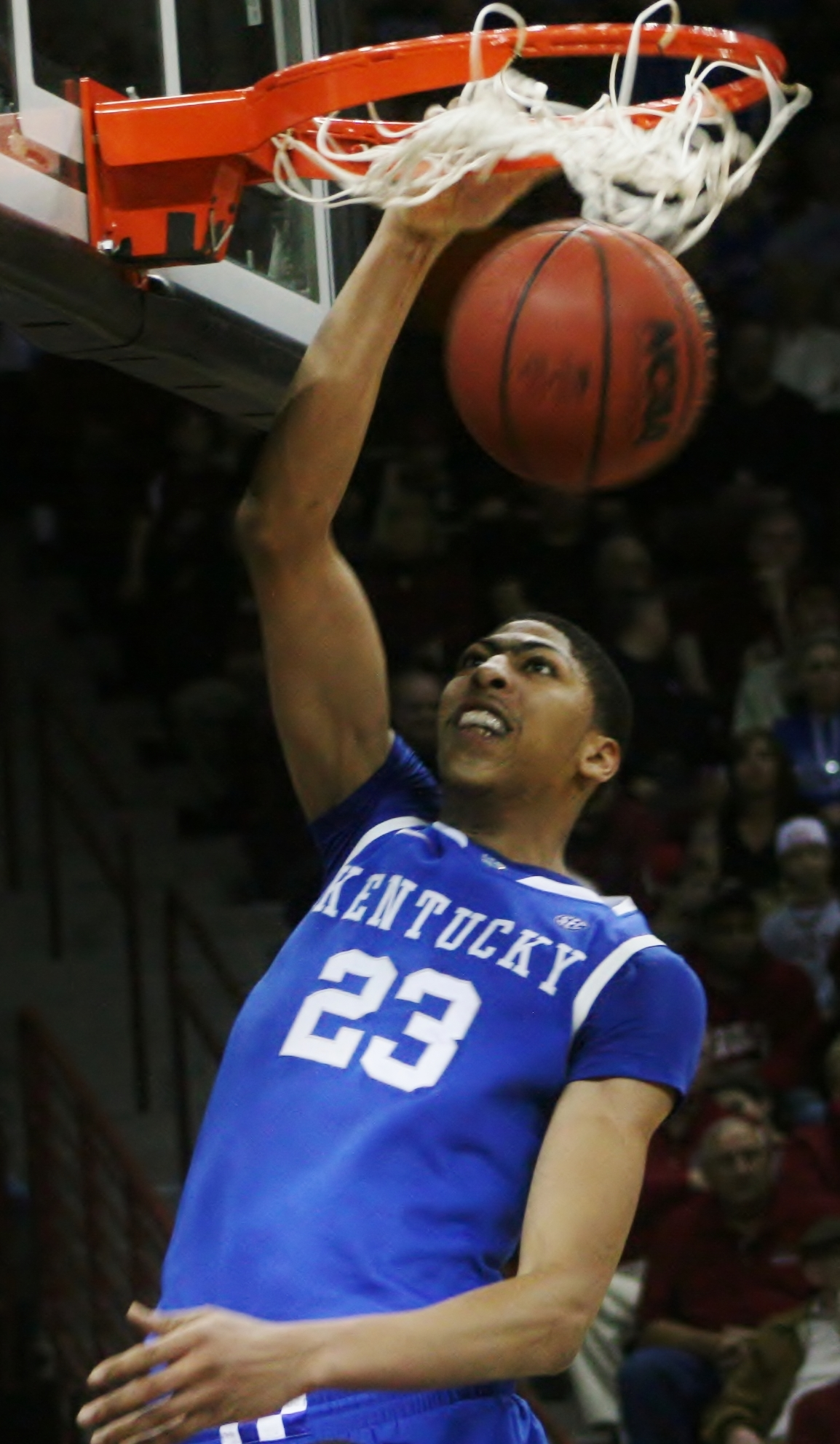
Anthony Davis won the award in 2012 as well as Naismith National Player of the Year

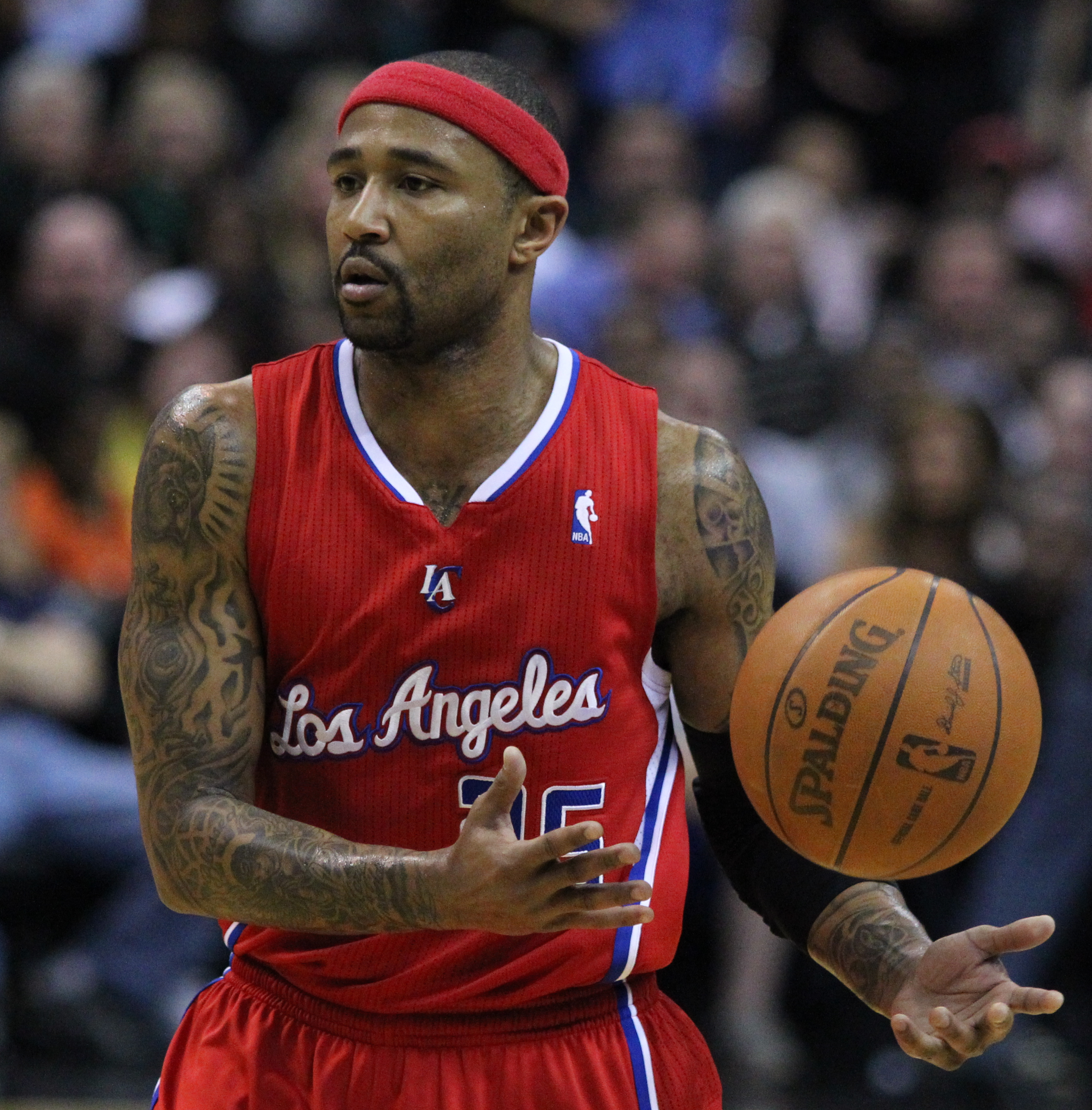
Mo Williams won the award for the Crimson Tide in 2002

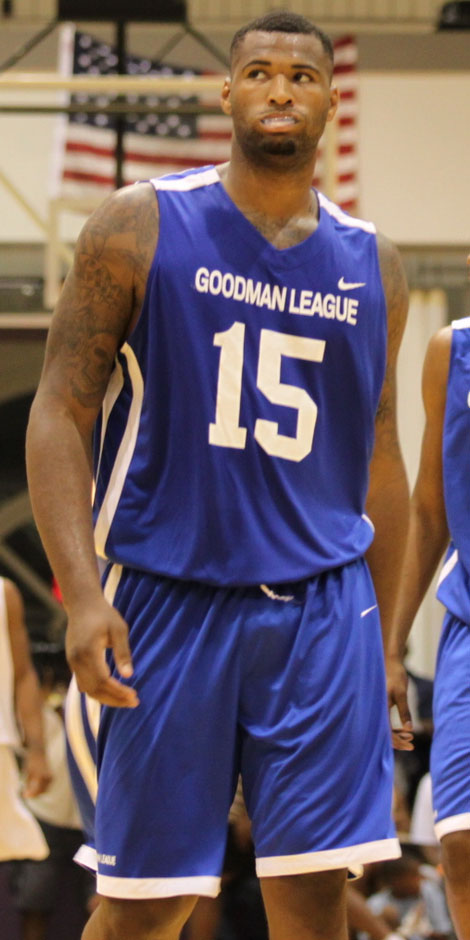
DeMarcus Cousins won the award 2010 while freshman teammate John Wall won Player of the Year

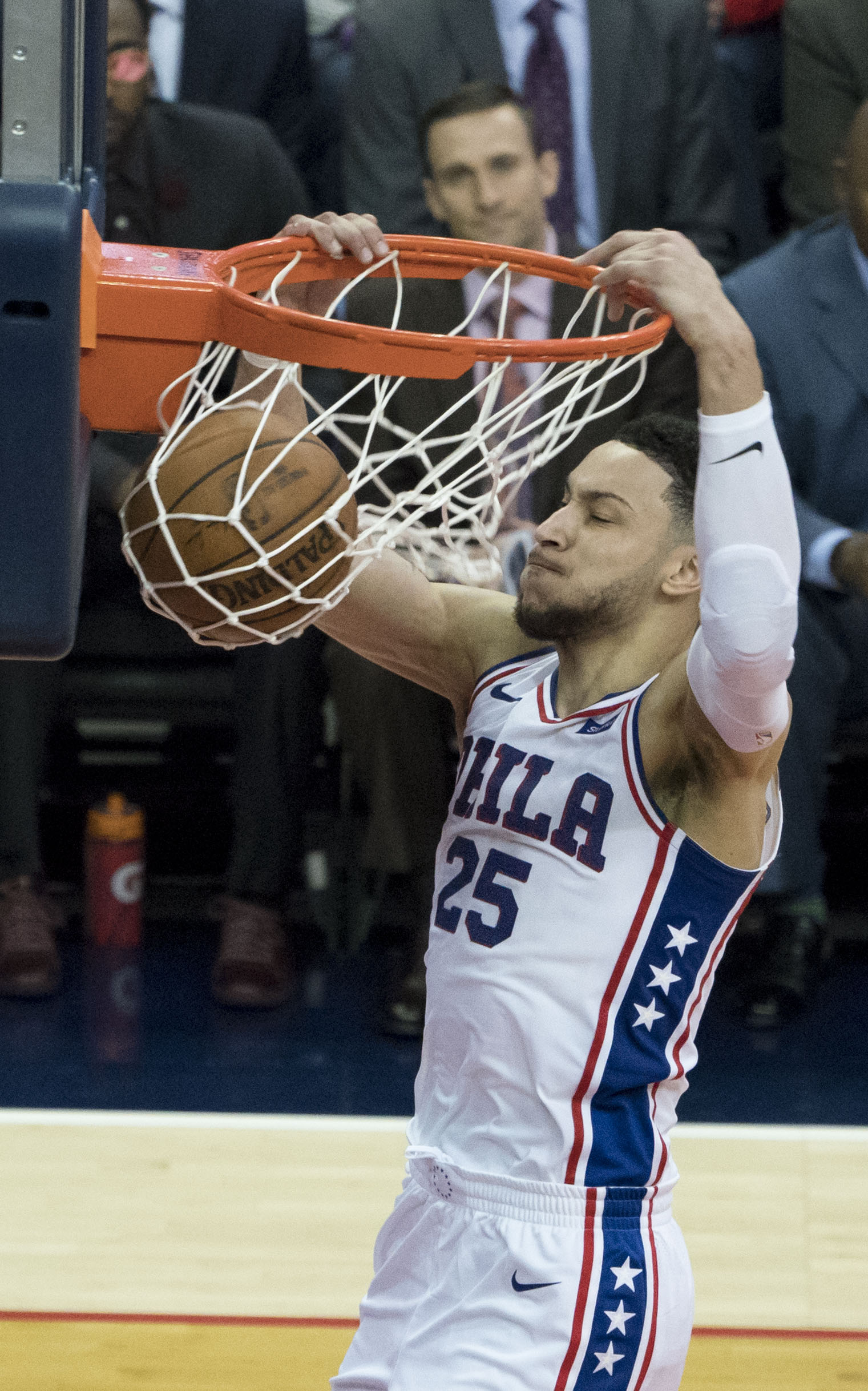
Ben Simmons won the award in 2016 as a freshman at LSU

Season	Player^{[a]}	School	Position
1997–98^{†}	Jumaine Jones	Georgia	Power forward
1997–98^{†}	Tony Harris	Tennessee	Point guard
1998–99	Chris Porter	Auburn	Small forward
1999–2000	Joe Johnson	Arkansas	Small forward
2000–01	Justin Reed	Ole Miss	Power forward
2001–02^{†}	Jarvis Hayes^{C}	Georgia	Power forward
2001–02^{†}	Maurice "Mo" Williams^{A}	Alabama	Point guard
2002–03	Anthony Roberson	Florida	Point guard
2003–04^{†}	Brandon Bass^{C}	LSU	Power forward
2003–04^{†}	Lawrence Roberts^{A}	Mississippi State	Power forward
2004–05	Glen Davis	LSU	Center
2005–06	Tyrus Thomas	LSU	Power forward
2006–07	Patrick Beverley	Arkansas	Point guard
2007–08^{†}	Nick Calathes^{A}	Florida	Point guard
2007–08^{†}	Patrick Patterson^{C}	Kentucky	Power forward
2008–09	Terrico White	Ole Miss	Point guard
2009–10	DeMarcus Cousins	Kentucky	Center
2010–11	Terrence Jones	Kentucky	Power forward
2011–12^{*}	Anthony Davis	Kentucky	Center
2012–13^{†}	Nerlens Noel^{C}	Kentucky	Center
2012–13^{†}	Marshall Henderson^{A}	Ole Miss	Shooting guard
2013–14	Julius Randle	Kentucky	Power forward
2014–15	Karl-Anthony Towns	Kentucky	Center
2015–16	Ben Simmons	LSU	Forward
2016–17	Malik Monk	Kentucky	Shooting guard
2017–18^{†}	Kevin Knox II^{C}	Kentucky	Guard
2017–18^{†}	Collin Sexton^{A, C}	Alabama	Guard
2018–19^{†}	Keldon Johnson^{C}	Kentucky	Forward
2018–19^{†}	Tyler Herro^{A}	Kentucky	Guard
2019–20	Anthony Edwards^{A}	Georgia	Guard
2020–21	Moses Moody	Arkansas	Guard
2021–22	Jabari Smith Jr.	Auburn	Forward
2022–23^{*}	Brandon Miller	Alabama	Forward
2023–24^{†}	Reed Sheppard^{C}	Kentucky	Guard
2023–24^{†}	Dalton Knecht^{A}	Tennessee	Guard
2024–25	Tre Johnson	Texas	Guard
2025–26^{*}	Darius Acuff Jr.	Arkansas	Point guard

== Winners by school ==
School	Winners	Years
Kentucky	12	2008^{†}, 2010, 2011, 2012, 2013^{†}, 2014, 2015, 2017, 2018^{†}, 2019^{†}, 2024^{†}
Arkansas	4	2000, 2007, 2021, 2026
LSU	4	2004^{†}, 2005, 2006, 2016
Alabama	3	2002^{†}, 2018^{†}, 2023
Georgia	3	1998, 2002, 2020
Ole Miss	3	2001, 2009, 2013^{†}
Auburn	2	1999, 2022
Florida	2	2003, 2008^{†}
Tennessee	2	1998^{†}, 2024^{†}
Texas	1	2025
Mississippi State	1	2004^{†}
Missouri	0	—
Oklahoma	0	—
South Carolina	0	—
Texas A&M	0	—
Vanderbilt	0	—

== Footnotes ==
- ^{a} Award is given to either a freshman or player in first season within the league.

SEC Media guide provides the entire list on page 128
