= Tre Johnson (basketball) =

American basketball player (born 2006)

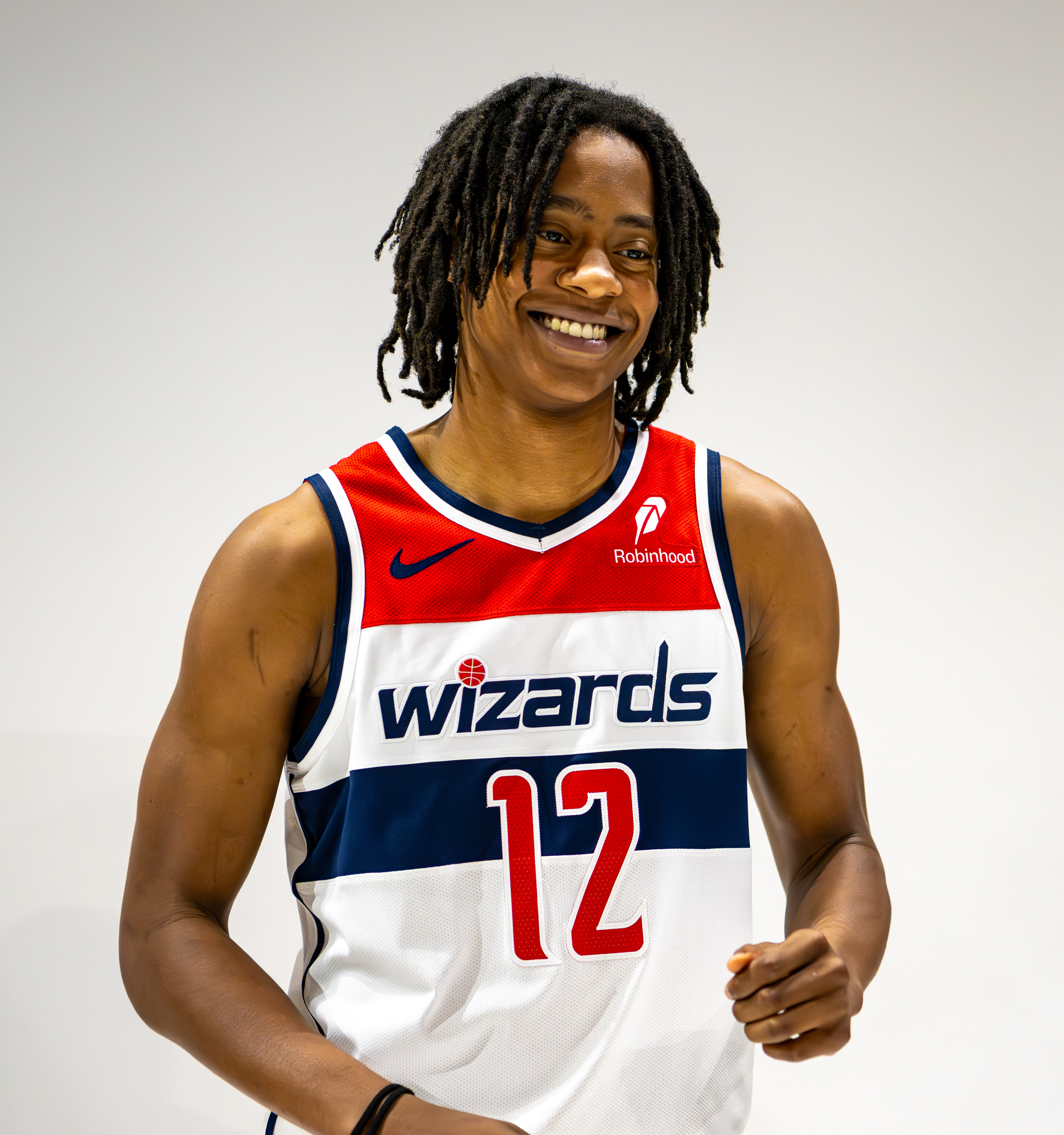
- Johnson with Washington Wizards in 2025

No. 12 – Washington Wizards
- Position: Shooting guard
- League: NBA

Personal information
- Born: March 7, 2006 (age 20) Dallas, Texas, U.S.
- Listed height: 6 ft 5 in (1.96 m)
- Listed weight: 190 lb (86 kg)

Career information
- High school: Lake Highlands (Dallas, Texas); Link Academy (Branson, Missouri)
- College: Texas (2024–2025)
- NBA draft: 2025: 1st round, 6th overall pick
- Drafted by: Washington Wizards
- Playing career: 2025–present

Career history
- 2025–present: Washington Wizards

Career highlights
- SEC Freshman of the Year (2025); Second-team All-SEC (2025); McDonald's All-American (2024); Jordan Brand Classic (2024); Nike Hoop Summit (2024); Texas Mr. Basketball (2023)
- Stats at NBA.com
- Stats at Basketball Reference

Richard Earl "Tre" Johnson III (born March 7, 2006) is an American professional basketball player for the Washington Wizards of the National Basketball Association (NBA). A consensus five-star recruit, he played college basketball for the Texas Longhorns and was the 2025 SEC Freshman of the Year. Johnson was selected sixth overall by the Wizards in the 2025 NBA draft.

== Early life ==
Johnson grew up in Dallas, Texas and attended Lake Highlands High School. He averaged 23.8 points, 5.6 rebounds and 2.3 assists per game as a sophomore. During his junior year, Johnson and Lake Highlands took part in the City of Palms Tournament, where he averaged 23 points per game. At the end of the season, he led Wildcats to their first state championship since 1968 and scored 29 points in the team's 55–44 win in the state championship game against Beaumont United High School. Johnson finished the season averaging 21.8 points, 6.4 rebounds and 2.7 assists per game and was named Texas Mr. Basketball. After the end of the school year, he transferred to Link Academy in Branson, Missouri. Johnson produced 15.5 points, 3.6 assists and 3.3 rebounds per contest while shooting nearly 40% from 3-point range and 90.5% from the free throw line during his senior year. Johnson led the Lions to a 26–7 record. Johnson was selected to play in the 2024 McDonald's All-American Boys Game during his senior year.

=== Recruiting ===
Johnson was a consensus five-star recruit and one of the top players in the 2024 class, according to major recruiting services. He was ranked the top overall recruit by 247Sports, ESPN, Rivals, and On3 throughout his junior year until he was surpassed by Dylan Harper during the summer of 2023. On November 15, 2023, Johnson committed to playing college basketball for Texas after considering an offer from Baylor.

College recruiting
Name	Hometown	School	Height	Weight	Commit date
Tre Johnson; SG	Dallas, TX	Link Academy (MO)	6 ft 6 in (1.98 m)	184 lb (83 kg)	Nov 15, 2023
Tre Johnson; SG	Recruit ratings: Rivals: 247Sports: On3: ESPN: (95)				
Overall recruit ranking: Rivals: 5 247Sports: 6 On3: 7 ESPN: 5
Note: In many cases, Scout, Rivals, 247Sports, On3, and ESPN may conflict in their listings of height and weight.; In these cases, the average was taken. ESPN grades are on a 100-point scale.; Sources: "Texas 2024 Basketball Commitments". Rivals.; "2024 Texas Longhorns Recruiting Class". ESPN.; "2024 Team Ranking". Rivals.

== College career ==
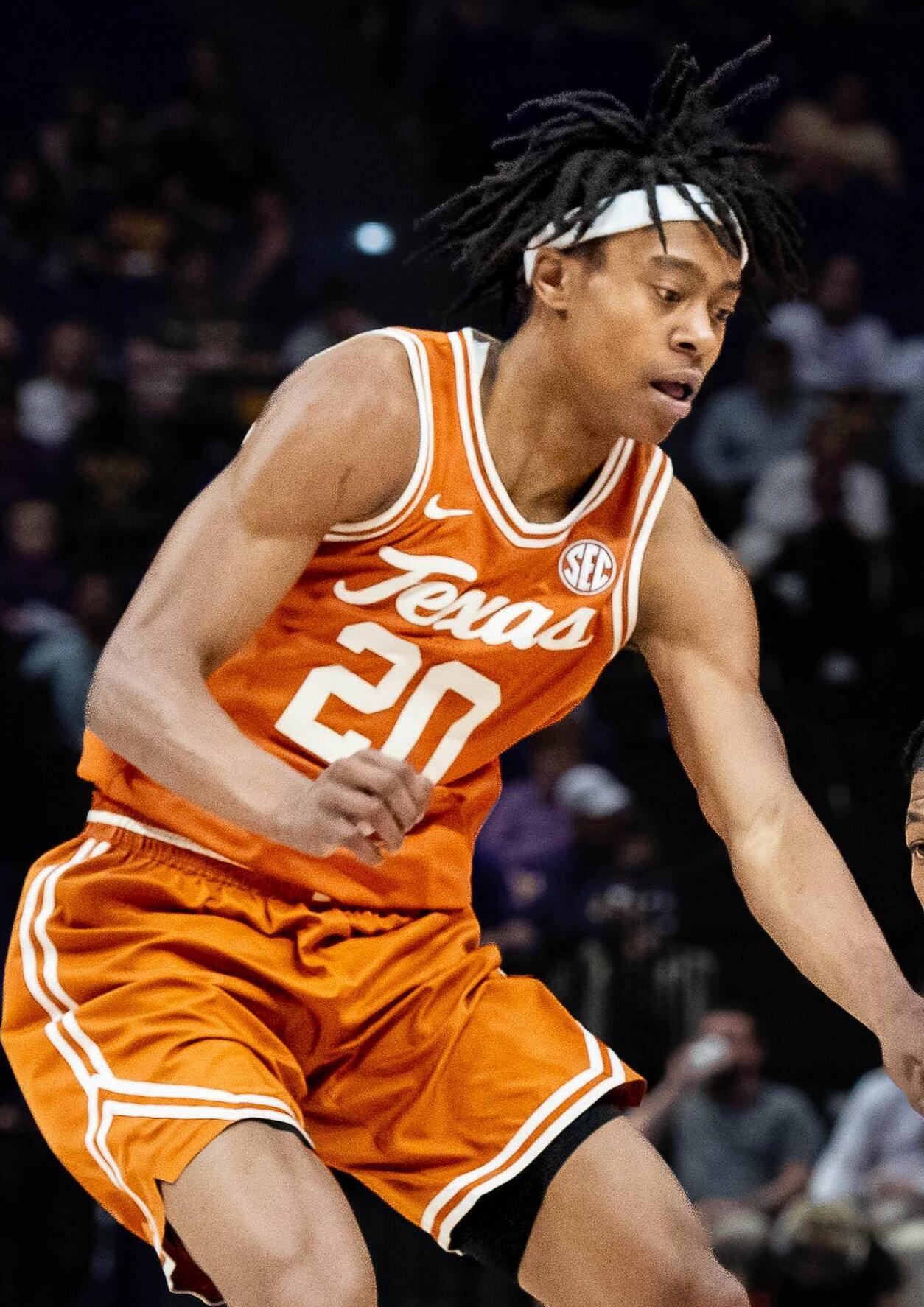
Johnson with the Texas Longhorns in 2025

At the beginning of the season, Johnson was named to the Jerry West Award watch list and Naismith College Player of the Year watch list. In his debut game against Ohio State, Johnson had 29 points, five rebounds, four assists, two steals, and one block. On February 26, 2025, Johnson broke Kevin Durant's freshman single-game program record by scoring 39 points in an overtime loss to Arkansas. In a win that pushed Texas into the last four in of the 2025 NCAA Division I men's basketball tournament according to many bracketologists, Johnson scored a game-high 20 points and hit the go-ahead 3-pointer in double overtime against the No. 14 Texas A&M in the second round of the 2025 SEC men's basketball tournament. Johnson ended the season averaging 19.9 points, 3.1 rebounds and 2.7 assists per game, shooting 39.7% from the three. He was named SEC Freshman of the Year.

== Professional career ==
Johnson was selected with the sixth overall pick by the Washington Wizards in the 2025 NBA draft. He made his professional debut on October 23, 2025 in a game against the Milwaukee Bucks, coming off the bench to register 16 points, including 4-of-8 shooting from three-point range. It was the franchise's highest scoring debut by a rookie since 1992.

== National team career ==
Johnson played for the United States team in the 2023 FIBA Under-19 Basketball World Cup, averaging 11.1 points, 2.9 rebounds, and 2.6 assists in seven games to place fourth in the tournament.

== Career statistics ==
Legend
GP	Games played	GS	Games started	MPG	Minutes per game
FG%	Field goal percentage	3P%	3-point field goal percentage	FT%	Free throw percentage
RPG	Rebounds per game	APG	Assists per game	SPG	Steals per game
BPG	Blocks per game	PPG	Points per game	**Bold**	Career high

=== NBA ===
Year	Team	GP	GS	MPG	FG%	3P%	FT%	RPG	APG	SPG	BPG	PPG
2025–26	Washington	60	42	24.1	.419	.358	.874	2.8	2.0	.6	.3	12.2
Career		60	42	24.1	.419	.358	.874	2.8	2.0	.6	.3	12.2

=== College ===
Year	Team	GP	GS	MPG	FG%	3P%	FT%	RPG	APG	SPG	BPG	PPG
2024–25	Texas	33	33	34.7	.427	.397	.871	3.1	2.7	.9	.3	19.9

== Personal life ==
Johnson's father, Richard Johnson Jr., played college basketball at Baylor before transferring to Midwestern State. His father is also an assistant coach at Lake Highlands. He has two younger brothers, Royce Johnson and Jamari Riley. Johnson majored in Physical Culture & Sports.
