= 2025–26 Washington Wizards season =

Season of NBA team the Washington Wizards

- Head coach: Brian Keefe
- President: Michael Winger
- General manager: Will Dawkins
- Owner: Ted Leonsis
- Arena: Capital One Arena

Results
- Record: 17–65 (.207)
- Place: Division: 5th (Southeast); Conference: 15th (Eastern)
- Playoff finish: Did not qualify
- Stats at Basketball Reference

Local media
- Television: Monumental Sports Network
- Radio: Federal News Radio; 106.7 The Fan

The 2025–26 Washington Wizards season was the 65th season of the franchise in the National Basketball Association (NBA) and 52nd in the Washington, D.C. area.

On January 9, 2026, the Wizards acquired guard Trae Young from the Atlanta Hawks through a trade for CJ McCollum and Corey Kispert. On February 5, the team later acquired more veterans in former All-Stars Anthony Davis and D'Angelo Russell through a three-team trade with the Dallas Mavericks and Charlotte Hornets. However, Young and Davis would not immediately suit up while recovering from injuries, while Russell did not play a single game for the Wizards.

In a game against the Miami Heat on March 10, Miami's Bam Adebayo scored 83 points, surpassing Kobe Bryant's 81-point performance against the Toronto Raptors in 2006 for the second-most points scored in NBA history.

On March 12, the Wizards were eliminated from playoff contention for the fifth season in a row following an overtime loss to the Orlando Magic. They finished the season with a 17–65 record, the second worst in franchise history after their 2023–24 season and the worst one throughout the entire season.

== Draft picks ==
| Round | Pick | Player | Position | Nationality | College |
|---|---|---|---|---|---|
| 1 | 6 | Tre Johnson | Shooting Guard | United States | Texas |
| 1 | 18 | Walter Clayton Jr. | Point Guard | United States | Florida |
| 2 | 40 | Micah Peavy | Point Guard | United States | Georgetown |

The Wizards entered the draft holding two first-round selections and one second-round pick. They had acquired an additional 2025 first-round selection, the 18th pick, from the Memphis Grizzlies via a trade in February 2025. Although Washington had traded its original 2025 second-round pick to the Brooklyn Nets in the five-team trade that sent Russell Westbrook to the Los Angeles Lakers in 2021 and the pick was eventually held by the Boston Celtics on draft night, the team acquired a second-round pick from the Phoenix Suns as part of the Bradley Beal trade in 2023.

With the sixth overall pick, they selected Tre Johnson from Texas. Washington traded its 18th overall pick to the Utah Jazz in exchange for the rights to the 21st pick (Will Riley), the 43rd pick (Jamir Watkins), and two future second-round selections.

== Roster ==
2025–26 Washington Wizards roster
Players

| Pos. | No. | Player | Height | Weight | DOB | From |
|---|---|---|---|---|---|---|
| F | 14 | Leaky Black (TW) | 6 ft 6 in (1.98 m) | 209 lb (95 kg) | 1999-06-14 | North Carolina |
| G | 7 | Bub Carrington | 6 ft 4 in (1.93 m) | 190 lb (86 kg) | 2005-07-21 | Pittsburgh |
| G/F | 9 | Justin Champagnie | 6 ft 6 in (1.98 m) | 206 lb (93 kg) | 2001-06-29 | Pittsburgh |
| G | 13 | Sharife Cooper (TW) | 6 ft 0 in (1.83 m) | 180 lb (82 kg) | 2001-06-11 | Auburn |
| G | 0 | Bilal Coulibaly (injured) | 6 ft 7 in (2.01 m) | 195 lb (88 kg) | 2004-07-26 | France |
| F/C | 23 | Anthony Davis (injured) | 6 ft 10 in (2.08 m) | 253 lb (115 kg) | 1993-03-11 | Kentucky |
| F | 18 | Kyshawn George (injured) | 6 ft 8 in (2.03 m) | 200 lb (91 kg) | 2003-12-12 | Miami (FL) |
| F | 16 | Anthony Gill (injured) | 6 ft 7 in (2.01 m) | 230 lb (104 kg) | 1992-10-17 | Virginia |
| G | 8 | Jaden Hardy | 6 ft 3 in (1.91 m) | 198 lb (90 kg) | 2002-07-05 | Coronado HS (NV) |
| G | 12 | Tre Johnson (injured) | 6 ft 5 in (1.96 m) | 190 lb (86 kg) | 2006-03-07 | Texas |
| F | 15 | Julian Reese (TW) | 6 ft 9 in (2.06 m) | 230 lb (104 kg) | 2003-06-30 | Maryland |
| F | 27 | Will Riley | 6 ft 9 in (2.06 m) | 180 lb (82 kg) | 2006-02-10 | Illinois |
| G | 28 | D'Angelo Russell (injured) | 6 ft 3 in (1.91 m) | 193 lb (88 kg) | 1996-02-23 | Ohio State |
| C | 20 | Alex Sarr (injured) | 7 ft 0 in (2.13 m) | 205 lb (93 kg) | 2005-04-26 | France |
| F | 00 | Tristan Vukčević (injured) | 7 ft 0 in (2.13 m) | 220 lb (100 kg) | 2003-03-11 | Serbia |
| F | 5 | Jamir Watkins | 6 ft 6 in (1.98 m) | 210 lb (95 kg) | 2001-07-06 | Florida State |
| F | 1 | Cam Whitmore (injured) | 6 ft 6 in (1.98 m) | 230 lb (104 kg) | 2004-07-08 | Villanova |
| G | 3 | Trae Young (injured) | 6 ft 2 in (1.88 m) | 164 lb (74 kg) | 1998-09-19 | Oklahoma |

Coaches
Head coach
- Brian Keefe
Assistant(s)
- Alexis Ajinça
- Adam Caporn
- James Fraschilla
- JJ Outlaw
- T. J. Sorrentine
- David Vanterpool

Legend
- (DP) Unsigned draft pick
- (FA) Free agent
- (S) Suspended
- (GL) G League assignment
- (TW) Two-way affiliate player
- Injured

Roster
Updated: March 3, 2026

== Standings ==
=== Division ===
| Southeast Division | W | L | PCT | GB | Home | Road | Div | GP |
|---|---|---|---|---|---|---|---|---|
| y – Atlanta Hawks | 46 | 36 | .561 | – | 24‍–‍17 | 22‍–‍19 | 9‍–‍7 | 82 |
| x – Orlando Magic | 45 | 37 | .549 | 1.0 | 26‍–‍16 | 19‍–‍21 | 9‍–‍8 | 82 |
| pi – Charlotte Hornets | 44 | 38 | .537 | 2.0 | 21‍–‍20 | 23‍–‍18 | 11‍–‍5 | 82 |
| pi – Miami Heat | 43 | 39 | .524 | 3.0 | 26‍–‍15 | 17‍–‍24 | 10‍–‍7 | 82 |
| Washington Wizards | 17 | 65 | .207 | 29.0 | 11‍–‍30 | 6‍–‍35 | 2‍–‍14 | 82 |

=== Conference ===
Eastern Conference
| # | Team | W | L | PCT | GB | GP |
|---|---|---|---|---|---|---|
| 1 | c – Detroit Pistons * | 60 | 22 | .732 | – | 82 |
| 2 | y – Boston Celtics * | 56 | 26 | .683 | 4.0 | 82 |
| 3 | x – New York Knicks | 53 | 29 | .646 | 7.0 | 82 |
| 4 | x – Cleveland Cavaliers | 52 | 30 | .634 | 8.0 | 82 |
| 5 | x – Toronto Raptors | 46 | 36 | .561 | 14.0 | 82 |
| 6 | y – Atlanta Hawks * | 46 | 36 | .561 | 14.0 | 82 |
| 7 | x – Philadelphia 76ers | 45 | 37 | .549 | 15.0 | 82 |
| 8 | x – Orlando Magic | 45 | 37 | .549 | 15.0 | 82 |
| 9 | pi – Charlotte Hornets | 44 | 38 | .537 | 16.0 | 82 |
| 10 | pi – Miami Heat | 43 | 39 | .524 | 17.0 | 82 |
| 11 | Milwaukee Bucks | 32 | 50 | .390 | 28.0 | 82 |
| 12 | Chicago Bulls | 31 | 51 | .378 | 29.0 | 82 |
| 13 | Brooklyn Nets | 20 | 62 | .244 | 40.0 | 82 |
| 14 | Indiana Pacers | 19 | 63 | .232 | 41.0 | 82 |
| 15 | Washington Wizards | 17 | 65 | .207 | 43.0 | 82 |

== Game log ==
=== Preseason ===
2025 preseason game log
Total: 1–2 (Home: 0–1; Road: 1–1)
Preseason: 1–2 (home: 0–1; road: 1–1)

| Game | Date | Team | Score | High points | High rebounds | High assists | Location Attendance | Record |
|---|---|---|---|---|---|---|---|---|
| 1 | October 12 | Toronto | L 112–113 | CJ McCollum (19) | George, Middleton (9) | Khris Middleton (5) | Capital One Arena; 9,403 | 0–1 |
| 2 | October 13 | @ New York | W 120–103 | Marvin Bagley III (18) | Marvin Bagley III (11) | Bub Carrington (4) | Madison Square Garden; 19,241 | 1–1 |
| 3 | October 16 | @ Detroit | L 98–119 | Kyshawn George (20) | Alex Sarr (9) | Khris Middleton (4) | Little Caesars Arena; 11,088 | 1–2 |

2025–26 preseason schedule

=== Regular season ===
2025–26 game log
Total: 17–65 (Home: 11–30; Road: 6–35)
October: 1–4 (home: 0–2; road: 1–2)

| Game | Date | Team | Score | High points | High rebounds | High assists | Location Attendance | Record |
|---|---|---|---|---|---|---|---|---|
| 1 | October 22 | @ Milwaukee | L 120–133 | Khris Middleton (23) | Alex Sarr (12) | Kyshawn George (4) | Fiserv Forum; 17,341 | 0–1 |
| 2 | October 24 | @ Dallas | W 117–107 | Kyshawn George (34) | Kyshawn George (11) | McCollum, Sarr (5) | American Airlines Center; 19,225 | 1–1 |
| 3 | October 26 | Charlotte | L 113–139 | CJ McCollum (24) | Kyshawn George (8) | Carrington, George, McCollum, Sarr (5) | Capital One Arena; 16,307 | 1–2 |
| 4 | October 28 | Philadelphia | L 134–139 (OT) | Alex Sarr (31) | Alex Sarr (11) | George, McCollum (7) | Capital One Arena; 15,529 | 1–3 |
| 5 | October 30 | @ Oklahoma City | L 108–127 | CJ McCollum (19) | Coulibaly, Sarr (8) | Kyshawn George (6) | Paycom Center; 18,203 | 1–4 |

November: 1–12 (home: 1–4; road: 0–8)

| Game | Date | Team | Score | High points | High rebounds | High assists | Location Attendance | Record |
|---|---|---|---|---|---|---|---|---|
| 6 | November 1 | Orlando | L 95–124 | Kyshawn George (17) | Alex Sarr (8) | Bub Carrington (5) | Capital One Arena; 14,602 | 1–5 |
| 7 | November 3 | @ New York | L 102–119 | Alex Sarr (19) | Alex Sarr (8) | Carrington, Sarr (7) | Madison Square Garden; 19,812 | 1–6 |
| 8 | November 5 | @ Boston | L 107–136 | Alex Sarr (31) | Alex Sarr (8) | Bub Carrington (6) | TD Garden; 19,156 | 1–7 |
| 9 | November 7 | Cleveland | L 114–148 | CJ McCollum (25) | Justin Champagnie (11) | Bub Carrington (11) | Capital One Arena; 14,054 | 1–8 |
| 10 | November 8 | Dallas | L 105–111 | CJ McCollum (25) | Tre Johnson (9) | Alex Sarr (5) | Capital One Arena; 16,258 | 1–9 |
| 11 | November 10 | @ Detroit | L 135–137 (OT) | CJ McCollum (42) | Alex Sarr (15) | Kyshawn George (6) | Little Caesars Arena; 17,994 | 1–10 |
| 12 | November 12 | @ Houston | L 112–135 | Alex Sarr (25) | Alex Sarr (11) | Kyshawn George (9) | Toyota Center; 18,055 | 1–11 |
| 13 | November 16 | Brooklyn | L 106–129 | Kyshawn George (29) | Kyshawn George (6) | Kyshawn George (5) | Capital One Arena; 14,164 | 1–12 |
| 14 | November 19 | @ Minnesota | L 109–120 | Kyshawn George (23) | Bagley III, George (7) | Kyshawn George (7) | Target Center; 16,578 | 1–13 |
| 15 | November 21 | @ Toronto | L 110–140 | CJ McCollum (20) | Tied (3) | Tied (4) | Scotiabank Arena; 19,800 | 1–14 |
| 16 | November 22 | @ Chicago | L 120–121 | Kispert, Whitmore (20) | Kyshawn George (12) | Kyshawn George (7) | United Center; 21,302 | 1–15 |
| 17 | November 25 | Atlanta | W 132–113 | CJ McCollum (46) | Alex Sarr (11) | Khris Middleton (12) | Capital One Arena; 15,522 | 2–15 |
| 18 | November 28 | @ Indiana | L 86–119 | Alex Sarr (24) | Alex Sarr (9) | George, Middleton (4) | Gainbridge Fieldhouse; 16,515 | 2–16 |

December: 6–8 (home: 3–5; road: 3–3)

| Game | Date | Team | Score | High points | High rebounds | High assists | Location Attendance | Record |
|---|---|---|---|---|---|---|---|---|
| 19 | December 1 | Milwaukee | W 129–126 | CJ McCollum (28) | Marvin Bagley III (9) | Khris Middleton (6) | Capital One Arena; 13,709 | 3–16 |
| 20 | December 2 | @ Philadelphia | L 102–121 | Tristan Vukčević (16) | Bagley III, George (8) | Kyshawn George (5) | Xfinity Mobile Arena; 16,743 | 3–17 |
| 21 | December 4 | Boston | L 101–146 | CJ McCollum (22) | Justin Champagnie (7) | Khris Middleton (4) | Capital One Arena; 16,026 | 3–18 |
| 22 | December 6 | Atlanta | L 116–131 | CJ McCollum (28) | Kyshawn George (6) | Bub Carrington (8) | Capital One Arena; 15,596 | 3–19 |
| 23 | December 12 | Cleveland | L 126–130 | Carrington, McCollum (27) | Marvin Bagley III (13) | Bub Carrington (8) | Capital One Arena; 15,465 | 3–20 |
| 24 | December 14 | @ Indiana | W 108–89 | Marvin Bagley III (23) | Bagley III, Champagnie (14) | Kyshawn George (9) | Gainbridge Fieldhouse; 16,001 | 4–20 |
| 25 | December 18 | @ San Antonio | L 94–119 | Alex Sarr (18) | Justin Champagnie (9) | Kyshawn George (6) | Frost Bank Center; 18,754 | 4–21 |
| 26 | December 20 | @ Memphis | W 130–122 | George, McCollum (28) | Champagnie, Sarr (11) | Kyshawn George (7) | FedExForum; 15,780 | 5–21 |
| 27 | December 21 | San Antonio | L 113–124 | Bub Carrington (21) | Tristan Vukčević (9) | Kyshawn George (7) | Capital One Arena; 20,028 | 5–22 |
| 28 | December 23 | @ Charlotte | L 109–126 | Khris Middleton (16) | Alex Sarr (11) | Kyshawn George (6) | Spectrum Center; 18,679 | 5–23 |
| 29 | December 26 | Toronto | W 138–117 | Kyshawn George (23) | Bilal Coulibaly (8) | Carrington, McCollum (4) | Capital One Arena; 15,575 | 6–23 |
| 30 | December 28 | Memphis | W 116–112 | Alex Sarr (20) | Justin Champagnie (12) | Bub Carrington (7) | Capital One Arena; 16,681 | 7–23 |
| 31 | December 29 | Phoenix | L 101–115 | Tre Johnson (24) | Bagley III, Coulibaly (7) | Tied (4) | Capital One Arena; 16,982 | 7–24 |
| 32 | December 31 | @ Milwaukee | W 114–113 | Carrington, Sarr (20) | Alex Sarr (11) | Khris Middleton (6) | Fiserv Forum; 17,341 | 8–24 |

January: 4–11 (home: 4–5; road: 0–6)

| Game | Date | Team | Score | High points | High rebounds | High assists | Location Attendance | Record |
|---|---|---|---|---|---|---|---|---|
| 33 | January 2 | Brooklyn | W 119–99 | Justin Champagnie (20) | Bagley III, Coulibaly (8) | Tied (4) | Capital One Arena; 16,486 | 9–24 |
| 34 | January 4 | Minnesota | L 115–141 | CJ McCollum (20) | Justin Champagnie (6) | Carrington, Sarr (4) | Capital One Arena; 16,728 | 9–25 |
| 35 | January 6 | Orlando | W 120–112 | CJ McCollum (27) | Bilal Coulibaly (8) | Johnson, McCollum (5) | Capital One Arena; 13,724 | 10–25 |
| 36 | January 7 | @ Philadelphia | L 110–131 | Tre Johnson (20) | Marvin Bagley III (9) | Malaki Branham (8) | Xfinity Mobile Arena; 19,746 | 10–26 |
| 37 | January 9 | New Orleans | L 107–128 | George, Vukčević (15) | Justin Champagnie (9) | Tied (4) | Capital One Arena; 16,563 | 10–27 |
| 38 | January 11 | @ Phoenix | L 93–112 | Johnson, Sarr (19) | Alex Sarr (15) | Bub Carrington (7) | Mortgage Matchup Center; 17,071 | 10–28 |
| 39 | January 14 | @ L.A. Clippers | L 105–119 | Kyshawn George (23) | Marvin Bagley III (11) | Bub Carrington (7) | Intuit Dome; 15,452 | 10–29 |
| 40 | January 16 | @ Sacramento | L 115–128 | Alex Sarr (19) | Kyshawn George (8) | Bub Carrington (9) | Golden 1 Center; 16,339 | 10–30 |
| 41 | January 17 | @ Denver | L 115–121 | Kyshawn George (29) | Justin Champagnie (9) | Kyshawn George (7) | Ball Arena; 19,968 | 10–31 |
| 42 | January 19 | L.A. Clippers | L 106–110 | Alex Sarr (28) | Marvin Bagley III (8) | Bub Carrington (7) | Capital One Arena; 16,630 | 10–32 |
| 43 | January 22 | Denver | L 97–107 | Kyshawn George (20) | Kyshawn George (12) | Kyshawn George (7) | Capital One Arena; 15,040 | 10–33 |
| 44 | January 24 | @ Charlotte | L 115–119 | Tre Johnson (26) | Justin Champagnie (11) | Bub Carrington (8) | Spectrum Center; 15,698 | 10–34 |
| 45 | January 27 | Portland | W 115–111 | Alex Sarr (29) | Alex Sarr (12) | Bilal Coulibaly (6) | Capital One Arena; 13,852 | 11–34 |
| 46 | January 29 | Milwaukee | W 109–99 | Kyshawn George (23) | Alex Sarr (17) | Bub Carrington (6) | Capital One Arena; 16,235 | 12–34 |
| 47 | January 30 | L.A. Lakers | L 111–142 | Malaki Branham (17) | Anthony Gill (10) | George, Carrington (6) | Capital One Arena; 20,028 | 12–35 |

February: 4–8 (home: 3–4; road: 1–4)

| Game | Date | Team | Score | High points | High rebounds | High assists | Location Attendance | Record |
|---|---|---|---|---|---|---|---|---|
| 48 | February 1 | Sacramento | W 116–112 | Will Riley (18) | Cooper, Labissière (7) | Carrington, Riley (6) | Capital One Arena; 13,102 | 13–35 |
| 49 | February 3 | New York | L 101–132 | Will Riley (17) | Alex Sarr (9) | AJ Johnson (4) | Capital One Arena; 17,822 | 13–36 |
| 50 | February 5 | @ Detroit | W 126–117 | Will Riley (20) | Justin Champagnie (7) | Cooper, Riley (5) | Little Caesars Arena; 19,401 | 14–36 |
| 51 | February 7 | @ Brooklyn | L 113–127 | Will Riley (27) | Justin Champagnie (9) | Bub Carrington (4) | Barclays Center; 17,548 | 14–37 |
| 52 | February 8 | Miami | L 101–132 | Tristan Vukčević (14) | Alex Sarr (12) | Carrington, Sarr (5) | Capital One Arena; 14,056 | 14–38 |
| 53 | February 11 | @ Cleveland | L 113–138 | Kyshawn George (17) | Justin Champagnie (8) | Sharife Cooper (5) | Rocket Arena; 19,432 | 14–39 |
All-Star Game
| 54 | February 19 | Indiana | W 112–105 | Tied (13) | Anthony Gill (8) | Sharife Cooper (7) | Capital One Arena; 14,602 | 15–39 |
| 55 | February 20 | Indiana | W 131–118 | Alondes Williams (25) | Alondes Williams (10) | Bub Carrington (7) | Capital One Arena; 15,846 | 16–39 |
| 56 | February 22 | Charlotte | L 112–129 | Bilal Coulibaly (17) | Alondes Williams (7) | Gill, Riley (4) | Capital One Arena; 16,443 | 16–40 |
| 57 | February 24 | @ Atlanta | L 98–119 | Will Riley (18) | Bub Carrington (10) | Bub Carrington (7) | State Farm Arena; 15,417 | 16–41 |
| 58 | February 26 | @ Atlanta | L 96–126 | Tied (14) | Will Riley (10) | Bub Carrington (5) | State Farm Arena; 15,828 | 16–42 |
| 59 | February 28 | Toronto | L 125–134 | Will Riley (19) | Tied (5) | Bub Carrington (5) | Capital One Arena; 17,429 | 16–43 |

March: 1–15 (home: 0–6; road: 1–9)

| Game | Date | Team | Score | High points | High rebounds | High assists | Location Attendance | Record |
|---|---|---|---|---|---|---|---|---|
| 60 | March 2 | Houston | L 118–123 | Bilal Coulibaly (23) | Bub Carrington (5) | Carrington, Watkins (4) | Capital One Arena; 17,352 | 16–44 |
| 61 | March 3 | @ Orlando | L 109–126 | Will Riley (19) | Leaky Black (9) | Carrington, Riley (5) | Kia Center; 16,894 | 16–45 |
| 62 | March 5 | Utah | L 112–122 | Julian Reese (18) | Julian Reese (20) | Trae Young (6) | Capital One Arena; 17,689 | 16–46 |
| 63 | March 8 | @ New Orleans | L 118–138 | Tre Johnson (20) | Julian Reese (9) | Trae Young (8) | Smoothie King Center; 16,698 | 16–47 |
| 64 | March 10 | @ Miami | L 129–150 | Alex Sarr (28) | Coulibaly, Sarr (6) | Bilal Coulibaly (7) | Kaseya Center; 19,700 | 16–48 |
| 65 | March 12 | @ Orlando | L 131–136 (OT) | Bilal Coulibaly (29) | Tristan Vukčević (11) | Trae Young (6) | Kia Center; 17,321 | 16–49 |
| 66 | March 14 | @ Boston | L 100–111 | Tristan Vukčević (22) | Jamir Watkins (6) | Bub Carrington (8) | TD Garden; 19,156 | 16–50 |
| 67 | March 16 | Golden State | L 117–125 | Tied (21) | Coulibaly, Gill (8) | Riley, Young (5) | Capital One Arena; 15,922 | 16–51 |
| 68 | March 17 | Detroit | L 117–130 | Bub Carrington (30) | Justin Champagnie (9) | Sharife Cooper (6) | Capital One Arena; 15,296 | 16–52 |
| 69 | March 19 | Detroit | L 95–117 | Tristan Vukčević (21) | Sharife Cooper (7) | Bub Carrington (4) | Capital One Arena; 16,572 | 16–53 |
| 70 | March 21 | Oklahoma City | L 111–132 | Bilal Coulibaly (21) | Tristan Vukčević (7) | Alex Sarr (8) | Capital One Arena; 20,028 | 16–54 |
| 71 | March 22 | @ New York | L 113–145 | Jaden Hardy (25) | Jamir Watkins (6) | Bub Carrington (8) | Madison Square Garden; 19,812 | 16–55 |
| 72 | March 25 | @ Utah | W 133–110 | Julian Reese (26) | Julian Reese (17) | Sharife Cooper (6) | Delta Center; 18,186 | 17–55 |
| 73 | March 27 | @ Golden State | L 126–131 | Will Riley (22) | Alex Sarr (9) | Carrington, Riley (5) | Chase Center; 18,064 | 17–56 |
| 74 | March 29 | @ Portland | L 88–123 | Will Riley (14) | Julian Reese (13) | Carrington, Reese (4) | Moda Center; 17,400 | 17–57 |
| 75 | March 30 | @ L.A. Lakers | L 101–120 | Will Riley (20) | Tre Johnson (6) | Bub Carrington (7) | Crypto.com Arena; 18,997 | 17–58 |

April: 0–7 (home: 0–4; road: 0–3)

| Game | Date | Team | Score | High points | High rebounds | High assists | Location Attendance | Record |
|---|---|---|---|---|---|---|---|---|
| 76 | April 1 | Philadelphia | L 131–153 | Anthony Gill (21) | Justin Champagnie (7) | Bub Carrington (7) | Capital One Arena; 17,956 | 17–59 |
| 77 | April 4 | @ Miami | L 136–152 | Will Riley (31) | Justin Champagnie (10) | Sharife Cooper (7) | Kaseya Center; 19,700 | 17–60 |
| 78 | April 5 | @ Brooklyn | L 115–121 | Will Riley (30) | Julian Reese (16) | Will Riley (6) | Barclays Center; 17,257 | 17–61 |
| 79 | April 7 | Chicago | L 98–129 | Bilal Coulibaly (19) | Julian Reese (11) | Bub Carrington (7) | Capital One Arena; 15,049 | 17–62 |
| 80 | April 9 | Chicago | L 108–119 | Will Riley (23) | Julian Reese (15) | Will Riley (7) | Capital One Arena; 15,482 | 17–63 |
| 81 | April 10 | Miami | L 117–140 | Bub Carrington (30) | Julian Reese (6) | Sharife Cooper (7) | Capital One Arena; 17,946 | 17–64 |
| 82 | April 12 | @ Cleveland | L 117–130 | Jamir Watkins (24) | Champagnie, Gill (6) | Bub Carrington (9) | Rocket Arena; 19,432 | 17–65 |

2025–26 season schedule

=== NBA Cup ===
After previously being winless in the last two NBA Cup appearances they had, the Wizards would finally win their first NBA Cup match on November 25, 2025 against the Atlanta Hawks. Despite that victory, however, it would be nowhere near enough for them to advance into the NBA Cup's tournament setting for this season.

==== East Group A ====
| Pos | Team | Pld | W | L | PF | PA | PD | Qualification |
|---|---|---|---|---|---|---|---|---|
| 1 | Toronto Raptors | 4 | 4 | 0 | 458 | 403 | +55 | Advanced to knockout rounds |
| 2 | Atlanta Hawks | 4 | 2 | 2 | 468 | 472 | −4 | |
| 3 | Cleveland Cavaliers | 4 | 2 | 2 | 492 | 466 | +26 | |
| 4 | Indiana Pacers | 4 | 1 | 3 | 431 | 431 | 0 | |
| 5 | Washington Wizards | 4 | 1 | 3 | 443 | 520 | −77 | |

Source: NBA

== Player statistics ==
Legend
| GP | Games played | GS | Games started | MPG | Minutes per game |
| FG% | Field-goal percentage | 3P% | 3-point field-goal percentage | FT% | Free-throw percentage |
| RPG | Rebounds per game | APG | Assists per game | SPG | Steals per game |
| BPG | Blocks per game | PPG | Points per game |

=== Regular season ===
Washington Wizards statistics
| Player | GP | GS | MPG | FG% | 3P% | FT% | RPG | APG | SPG | BPG | PPG |
|---|---|---|---|---|---|---|---|---|---|---|---|
| Marvin Bagley III^{†} | 38 | 8 | 19.2 | .626 | .421 | .711 | 5.7 | 1.5 | .5 | .7 | 10.1 |
| Leaky Black | 15 | 9 | 28.9 | .388 | .345 | .875 | 5.0 | 1.5 | 1.2 | .5 | 7.1 |
| Malaki Branham | 28 | 0 | 9.9 | .473 | .378 | .824 | 1.6 | .8 | .4 | .1 | 4.6 |
| Bub Carrington | 82 | 48 | 27.7 | .424 | .408 | .730 | 3.4 | 4.6 | .6 | .2 | 10.7 |
| Justin Champagnie | 69 | 19 | 20.0 | .502 | .319 | .784 | 5.6 | 1.2 | .9 | .6 | 8.7 |
| Sharife Cooper | 41 | 1 | 17.1 | .514 | .382 | .833 | 2.1 | 3.0 | .4 | .1 | 8.1 |
| Bilal Coulibaly | 56 | 56 | 26.2 | .425 | .319 | .746 | 4.3 | 2.6 | 1.3 | 1.0 | 11.7 |
| Kyshawn George | 48 | 48 | 29.0 | .438 | .381 | .802 | 5.1 | 4.5 | 1.0 | .9 | 14.8 |
| Keshon Gilbert^{†} | 3 | 0 | 16.0 | .250 | .000 | 1.000 | 1.7 | 1.0 | .7 | 1.3 | 2.0 |
| Anthony Gill | 55 | 8 | 17.3 | .628 | .354 | .739 | 2.9 | 1.3 | .6 | .4 | 5.8 |
| Jaden Hardy^{†} | 23 | 0 | 20.4 | .443 | .420 | .686 | 1.7 | 1.3 | .3 | .2 | 12.6 |
| AJ Johnson^{†} | 25 | 0 | 8.6 | .325 | .280 | .750 | 1.2 | .9 | .3 | .0 | 2.8 |
| Tre Johnson | 60 | 42 | 24.1 | .419 | .358 | .874 | 2.8 | 2.0 | .6 | .3 | 12.2 |
| Corey Kispert^{†} | 19 | 2 | 19.5 | .496 | .395 | .765 | 2.3 | 1.7 | .4 | .2 | 9.2 |
| Skal Labissière | 3 | 0 | 12.7 | .600 | .200 | | 3.0 | 1.0 | .7 | .3 | 4.3 |
| CJ McCollum^{†} | 35 | 35 | 30.9 | .454 | .393 | .804 | 3.5 | 3.6 | .7 | .3 | 18.8 |
| Khris Middleton^{†} | 34 | 34 | 24.3 | .433 | .333 | .841 | 3.9 | 3.3 | .8 | .3 | 10.3 |
| Julian Reese | 13 | 10 | 30.9 | .529 | | .636 | 10.5 | 1.8 | 1.4 | .6 | 11.8 |
| Kadary Richmond | 3 | 0 | 22.3 | .625 | .500 | 1.000 | 3.3 | 2.7 | 2.7 | .3 | 8.3 |
| Will Riley | 74 | 18 | 22.1 | .439 | .316 | .800 | 2.9 | 2.0 | .7 | .1 | 10.3 |
| Alex Sarr | 48 | 48 | 27.2 | .482 | .333 | .692 | 7.4 | 2.7 | .8 | 2.0 | 16.3 |
| Tristan Vukčević | 49 | 12 | 13.7 | .479 | .347 | .784 | 3.0 | 1.1 | .5 | .7 | 9.0 |
| Jamir Watkins | 50 | 7 | 20.6 | .446 | .297 | .695 | 3.9 | 1.3 | 1.1 | .5 | 7.4 |
| Cam Whitmore | 21 | 0 | 16.9 | .456 | .286 | .742 | 2.8 | .7 | .7 | .4 | 9.2 |
| Alondes Williams | 4 | 0 | 25.3 | .615 | .357 | .875 | 6.3 | 3.0 | .8 | .8 | 11.0 |
| Trae Young^{†} | 5 | 5 | 20.8 | .595 | .429 | .708 | 3.0 | 6.2 | .6 | .2 | 15.2 |

- ^{†} Denotes player spent time with another team in the season. Stats reflect time with the Wizards only.

== Transactions ==
=== Trades ===
June 25, 2025
To Washington Wizards

- Draft rights to Will Riley (No. 21)
- Draft rights to Jamir Watkins (No. 43)
- 2031 second-round pick
- 2032 UTA second-round pick
To Utah Jazz

- Draft rights to Walter Clayton Jr. (No. 18)

June 28, 2025
To Washington Wizards

- Dillon Jones
To Oklahoma City Thunder

- Colby Jones
- 2029 HOU second-round pick

July 6, 2025
Three-team trade

To Houston Rockets

- 2026 CHI second-round pick (from Washington)
- 2029 SAC second-round pick (from Washington)
- Draft rights to Mojave King (2023 No. 47) (from New Orleans)
To New Orleans Pelicans

- Saddiq Bey (from Washington)
- Jordan Poole (from Washington)
- Draft rights to Micah Peavy (No. 40) (from Washington)
To Washington Wizards

- CJ McCollum (from New Orleans)
- Kelly Olynyk (from New Orleans)
- Cam Whitmore (from Houston)
- 2027 CHI second-round pick (Note: This pick was previously split, with Washington receiving it if No. 31–50 and New Orleans receiving it if No. 51–60; Washington will now receive the pick regardless of its position.) (from New Orleans)
July 8, 2025
To Washington Wizards

- Malaki Branham
- Blake Wesley
- 2026 second-round pick
To San Antonio Spurs

- Kelly Olynyk

January 9, 2026
To Washington Wizards

- Trae Young
To Atlanta Hawks

- CJ McCollum
- Corey Kispert

February 5, 2026
Three-team trade

To Charlotte Hornets

- Malaki Branham (from Washington)
To Dallas Mavericks

- Marvin Bagley III (from Washington)
- AJ Johnson (from Washington)
- Tyus Jones (from Charlotte)
- Khris Middleton (from Washington)
- 2026 first-round pick (Note: The least favorable of the picks originally belonging to Houston, the Los Angeles Clippers, and Oklahoma City; Houston's pick is protected and only available if No. 5–30.) (from Washington)
- 2026 PHX second-round pick (from Washington)
- 2027 CHI second-round pick (from Washington)
- 2029 HOU second-round pick (from Washington)
- 2030 GSW protected first-round pick (Note: Dallas will receive the pick if it's No. 21–30.) (from Washington)
To Washington Wizards

- Anthony Davis (from Dallas)
- Danté Exum (from Dallas)
- Jaden Hardy (from Dallas)
- D'Angelo Russell (from Dallas)

=== Free agency ===
==== Re-signed ====
| Date re-signed | Player | Contract | Ref. |
|---|---|---|---|
| August 7, 2025 | Anthony Gill | 1 year | |
| February 22, 2026 | Tristan Vukčević | 3 year, $9M | |

==== Additions ====
| Date signed | Player | Contract | Former team | Ref. |
|---|---|---|---|---|
| July 10, 2025 | Marvin Bagley III | 1 year, $3,080,921 | Memphis Grizzlies | |
| February 22, 2026 | Leaky Black | Two-Way Contract | Capital City Go-Go | |
| February 28, 2026 | Julian Reese | Two-Way Contract | Raptors 905 | |

==== Subtractions ====
| Date signed | Player | Notes | New team | Ref. |
|---|---|---|---|---|
| Richaun Holmes | July 14, 2025 | Waived | Panathinaikos (Greek Basketball League) | |
| Blake Wesley | July 19, 2025 | Waived | Portland Trail Blazers | |
| Marcus Smart | July 20, 2025 | Waived, buyout | Los Angeles Lakers | |
| Jaylen Martin | August 4, 2025 | Waived | Philadelphia 76ers | |
| Dillon Jones | October 19, 2025 | Waived | Rip City Remix | |
| Danté Exum | February 8, 2026 | Waived | | |
