= Julian Reese =

American basketball player (born 2003)

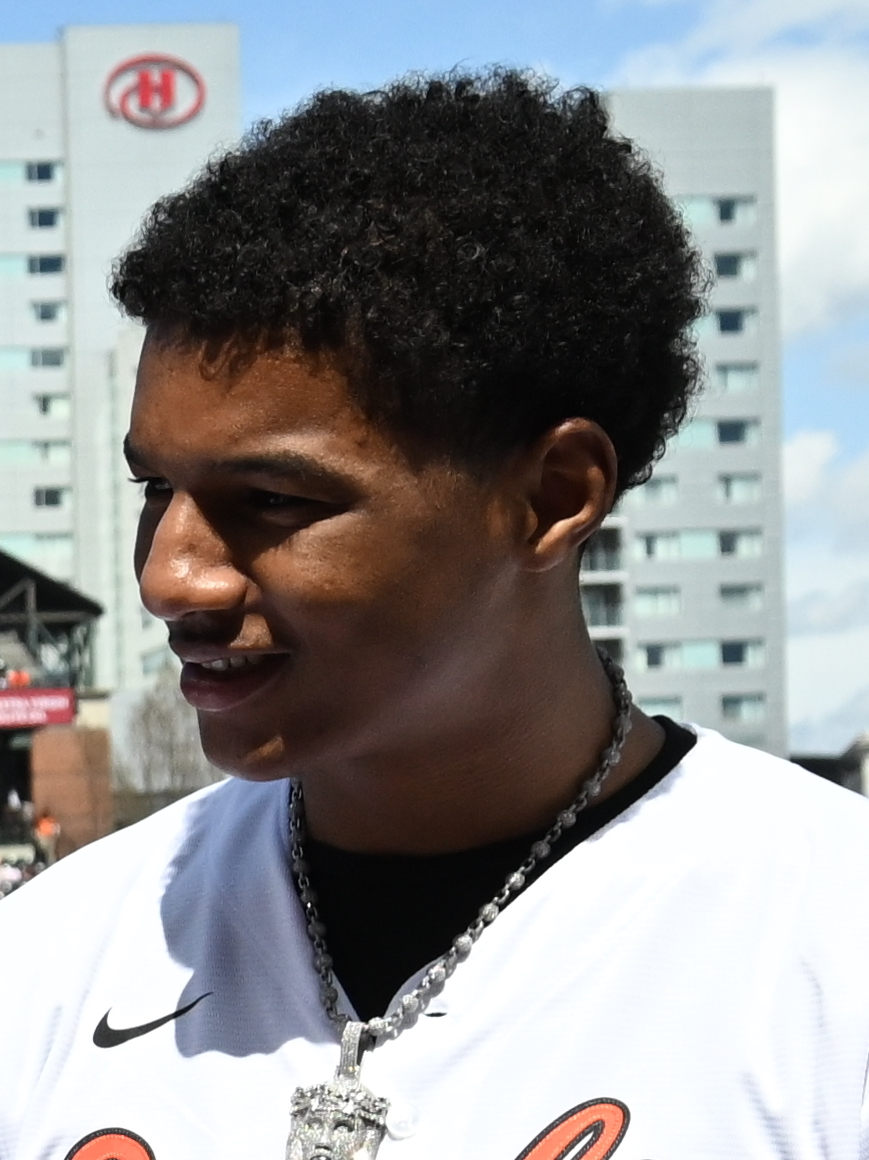
- Reese in 2025

No. 13 – New Orleans Pelicans
- Position: Power forward
- League: NBA

Personal information
- Born: June 30, 2003 (age 23) Baltimore, Maryland, U.S.
- Listed height: 6 ft 11 in (2.11 m)
- Listed weight: 230 lb (104 kg)

Career information
- High school: St. Frances Academy (Baltimore, Maryland)
- College: Maryland (2021–2025)
- NBA draft: 2025: undrafted
- Playing career: 2025–present

Career history
- 2025–2026: Raptors 905
- 2026: Washington Wizards
- 2026: →Capital City Go-Go
- 2026–present: New Orleans Pelicans
- 2026–present: →Laketown Squadron
- Stats at NBA.com
- Stats at Basketball Reference

Julian Reese (born June 30, 2003) is an American professional basketball player for the New Orleans Pelicans of the National Basketball Association (NBA), on a two-way contract with the Laketown Squadron of the NBA G League. He played college basketball for the Maryland Terrapins.

== Early life and high school ==
Coming out of high school, Reese was rated as a four-star recruit and committed to play college basketball for the Maryland Terrapins.

== College career ==
As a freshman in 2021-22, Reese averaged 5.7 points and 4.4 rebounds in 17.7 minutes per game. Ahead of the 2022-23 season, he became a full-time starter for the Terrapins. On February 16, 2023, Reese helped the Terrapins to an upset win over #3 Purdue. He finished the 2022-23 season averaging 11.4 points, 7.2 rebounds and 1.2 blocks per game, earning All-Big Ten honorable mention.

In 2023-24, Reese averaged 13.7 points, 9.5 rebounds and 1.9 blocks per game and earned all-Big Ten honorable mention. On November 11, 2024, he put up 21 points and nine rebounds in a victory over Florida A&M. On January 23, 2025, Reese put up 27 points, 17 rebounds, and three blocks in a blowout win over Illinois. On January 29, he put up 14 points and eight rebounds in a victory over Wisconsin. On March 5, Reese tallied six points and four rebounds in a win over Michigan.

== Professional career ==
After going undrafted in the 2025 NBA draft, Reese joined the Los Angeles Lakers for the 2025 NBA Summer League. On October 17, 2025, Reese signed an Exhibit 10 contract with the Toronto Raptors.

On February 28, 2026, Reese was signed to a two-way contract by the Washington Wizards. His first game with the team came two days later, against the Houston Rockets, where he was pressed into service as the Wizards' starting center as all the team's other big men were out with injury. Reese went 1-for-3 in shooting on the night, earning his first two points as an NBA player, in addition to four rebounds and three steals. Reese also committed three turnovers and fouled out after almost 28 minutes that same night. On March 5, Reese put up a double-double with 18 points and 20 rebounds, 10 offensive and 10 defensive, in a 122–112 loss to the Utah Jazz. He became the first player since Antawn Jamison in 2010 to put up 10 offensive and 10 defensive rebounds in a game in Wizards franchise history. On March 25, Reese had another double-double with 26 points, 17 rebounds, a steal, and a block across 30 minutes of a 133-110 win over the Jazz.

On August 20, 2026, Reese was traded to the Denver Nuggets. However, he was released by the Nuggets on August 28.

== Personal life ==
Reese is the brother of WNBA All-Star Angel Reese. Reese's mother played college basketball for UMBC, where she was inducted into the Athletics Hall of Fame and her number 10 jersey was retired. She later played professionally in Luxembourg, Reese's father, Michael Reese, played basketball for Boston College and Loyola (Maryland) before embarking on a professional career in Luxembourg, Cyprus, Austria, and Portugal.

== Career statistics ==
Legend
GP	Games played	GS	Games started	MPG	Minutes per game
FG%	Field goal percentage	3P%	3-point field goal percentage	FT%	Free throw percentage
RPG	Rebounds per game	APG	Assists per game	SPG	Steals per game
BPG	Blocks per game	PPG	Points per game	**Bold**	Career high

=== NBA ===
Year	Team	GP	GS	MPG	FG%	3P%	FT%	RPG	APG	SPG	BPG	PPG
2025–26	Washington	13	10	30.9	.529	—	.636	10.5	1.8	1.4	.6	11.8
Career		13	10	30.9	.529	—	.636	10.5	1.8	1.4	.6	11.8

=== College ===
Season	Team	GP	GS	MPG	FG%	3P%	FT%	RPG	APG	SPG	BPG	PPG
2021–22	Maryland	31	1	17.7	.456	**.304**	**.804**	4.4	.4	.4	.7	5.7
2022–23	Maryland	34	33	27.0	**.632**	.000	.533	7.2	1.0	.8	1.2	11.4
2023–24	Maryland	32	32	**31.9**	.546	.000	.568	**9.5**	**1.3**	1.0	**1.9**	**13.7**
2024–25	Maryland	**36**	**36**	28.5	.555	.000	.734	9.0	**1.3**	**1.1**	1.5	13.3
Career		134	102	26.4	.557	.292	.630	7.6	1.0	.8	1.3	11.1
