= Brian Keefe =

American basketball coach on the hot seat (born 1976)

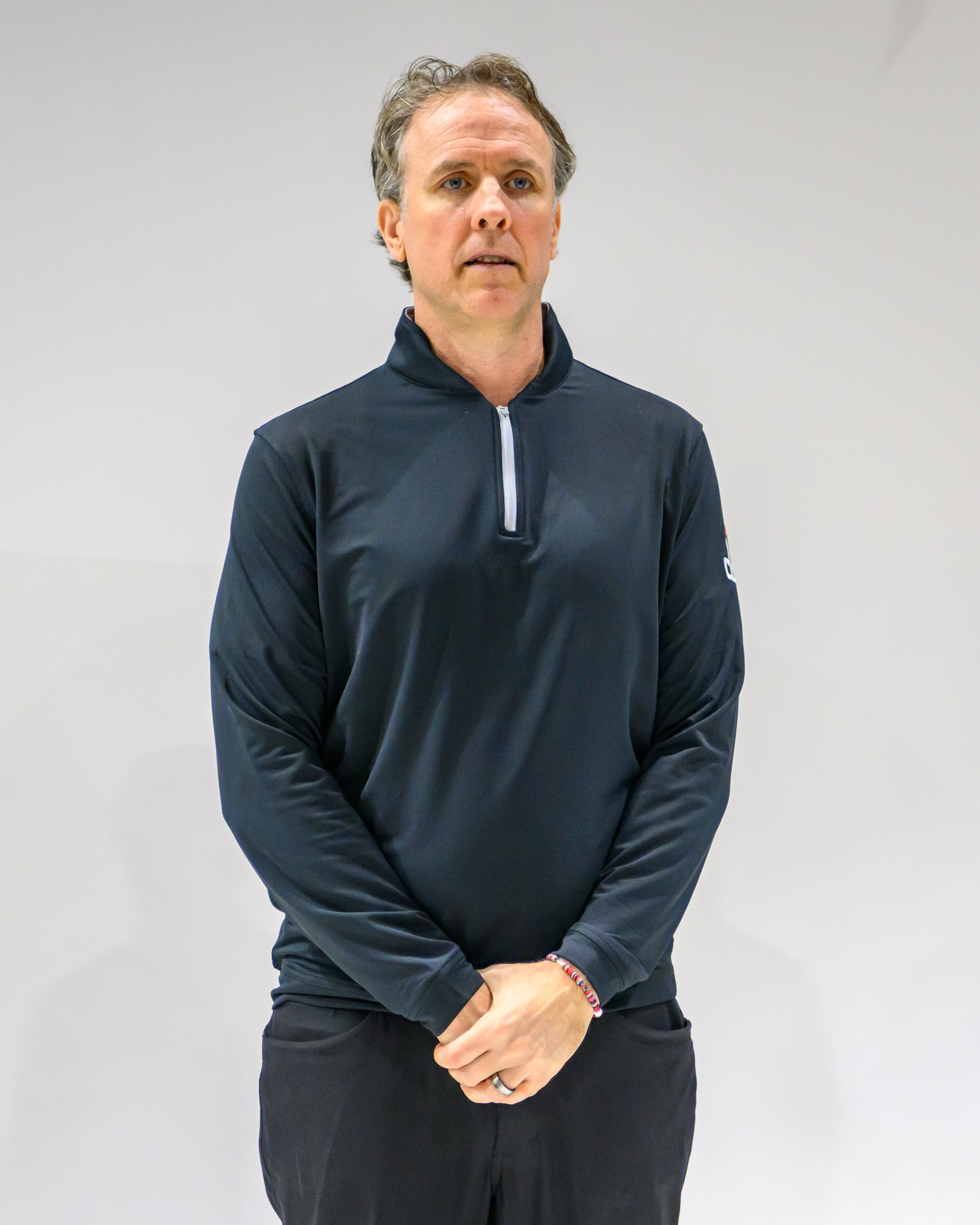
- Keefe in 2025

Washington Wizards
- Title: Head coach
- League: NBA

Personal information
- Born: April 7, 1976 (age 50) Winchester, Massachusetts, U.S.
- Listed height: 6 ft 4 in (1.93 m)

Career information
- College: UC Irvine (1994–1996); UNLV (1997–1999)
- Position: Guard
- Coaching career: 2000–present

Career history

Coaching
- 2000–2001: South Florida (assistant)
- 2001–2005: Bryant (assistant)
- 2007–2015: Seattle SuperSonics/ Oklahoma City Thunder (assistant)
- 2015–2016: New York Knicks (assistant)
- 2016–2019: Los Angeles Lakers (assistant)
- 2019–2020: Oklahoma City Thunder (assistant)
- 2021–2023: Brooklyn Nets (assistant)
- 2023–2024: Washington Wizards (assistant)
- 2024–present: Washington Wizards

Brian J. Keefe (born April 7, 1976) is an American professional basketball coach who is the head coach for the Washington Wizards of the National Basketball Association (NBA).

== Early life and playing career ==
Brian Keefe was born in Winchester, Massachusetts.

As a high-school shooting guard, he was Winchester High School's all-time leading scorer, averaging 28 points a game, with his record of 1,163 points standing for 25 years before it was broken in 2018. Keefe was inducted in the Winchester Sport Foundation Hall of Fame in 2004. He was a teammate of Kirk Minihane.

Keefe began his collegiate playing career at UC Irvine, where he was appointed team captain as a sophomore and named All-Big West Second Team in 1995–96 after leading the team in scoring. After transferring to UNLV for his final two seasons, Keefe helped the Running Rebels win the Western Athletic Conference Tournament and earn an NCAA berth. He was named to the WAC All-Tournament Team after making a tournament-record 13 three-pointers. During his senior season in 1998–99, Keefe was named team captain and helped lead UNLV to an NIT appearance.

== Coaching career ==
=== Early career ===
Keefe began his coaching career as a graduate assistant at the University of South Florida for the 2000–01 season before he was tapped to be assistant coach to Max Good at Bryant University in Smithfield, R.I. for four seasons (2001–05). In his final season, he helped the Bryant Bulldogs earn a trip to the Division II Championship in 2005, losing to Virginia Union.

=== NBA career ===
Keefe started his career in professional basketball at the San Antonio Spurs where he served as video coordinator under head coach Gregg Popovich, and won a ring as part of the Spurs 2007 championship in his second season.

Keefe was selected by former Spurs assistant general manager Sam Presti and former Spurs assistant coach PJ Carlesimo to join them in laying the groundwork for what would become the Oklahoma City Thunder. He joined the team as assistant coach on August 23, 2007, when the team was still the Seattle SuperSonics. He became the performance lead for the team, with responsibility for the development of the team's young roster including their draft picks Kevin Durant, Russell Westbrook and James Harden. All three went on to become MVPs of the league. In 2010, Keefe became the Thunder's defensive coordinator.

After seven years with the Thunder, Keefe joined the New York Knicks as assistant coach under head coach and former Thunder player Derek Fisher and team president Phil Jackson, where he focused on defense and the development of then-rookie Kristaps Porziņģis.

In August 2016, Keefe was recruited to join the Los Angeles Lakers coaching staff as an assistant coach under head coach Luke Walton, and became the team's defensive coordinator in 2017. Keefe was sought after for his ability to develop players into top talent and became responsible for the development of the team including Brandon Ingram. In his first year as defensive coordinator of the Lakers, Keefe took the team to 12th place in defense; the team finished 30th in defense the previous year.

In July 2019, Keefe rejoined the Oklahoma City Thunder coaching staff to lead the defense under head coach Billy Donovan., and took over responsibility for the development of Shai Gilgeous-Alexander Gilgeous-Alexander went on to become MVP of the league.

On August 3, 2021, Keefe was hired as an assistant coach of the Brooklyn Nets, where he led the defense. He parted ways with the Nets in May 2023.

In July 2023, Keefe was hired as assistant coach of the Washington Wizards and on January 25, 2024, the Wizards announced Keefe as the interim head coach after Wes Unseld Jr. was relieved of his coaching duties and moved to a front office position. On May 29, the Wizards announced that Keefe was named the 26th head coach in franchise history.

Keefe was head coach of the Wizards when Bam Adebayo scored 83 points on March 10, 2026, in a game against Keefe's team. Many in the NBA were critical of Keefe's coaching performance.

== Head coaching record ==
=== NBA ===
Legend
Regular season	G	Games coached	W	Games won	L	Games lost	W–L %	Win–loss %
Playoffs	PG	Playoff games	PW	Playoff wins	PL	Playoff losses	PW–L %	Playoff win–loss %

Team	Year	G	W	L	W–L%	Finish	PG	PW	PL	PW–L%	Result
Washington	2023–24	39	8	31	.205	5th in Southeast	—	—	—	—	Missed playoffs
Washington	2024–25	82	18	64	.220	5th in Southeast	—	—	—	—	Missed playoffs
Washington	2025–26	82	17	65	.207	5th in Southeast	—	—	—	—	Missed playoffs
Career		203	43	160	.212		—	—	—	—	
