= Shai Gilgeous-Alexander =

Canadian basketball player (born 1998)

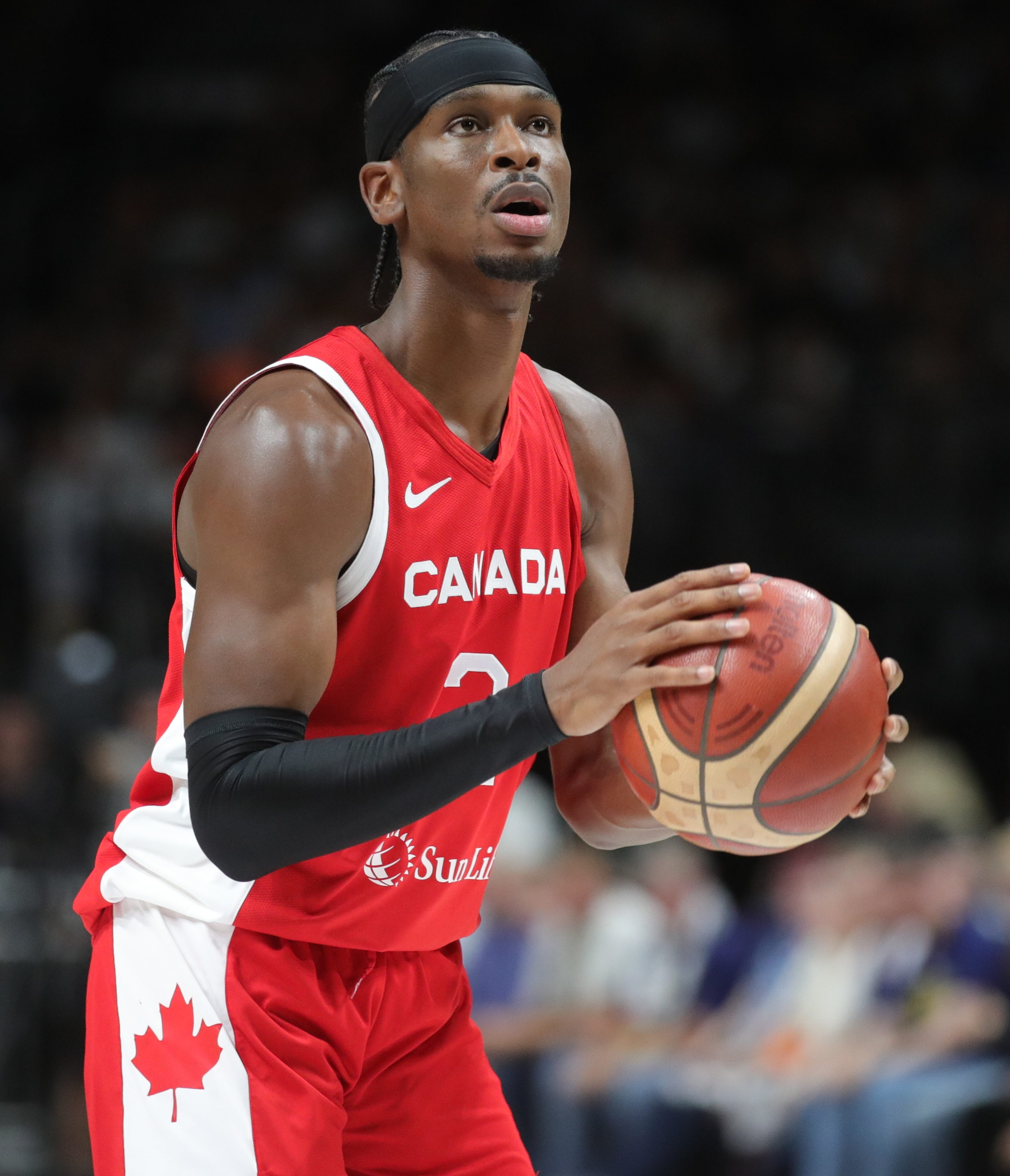
- Gilgeous-Alexander with Canada in 2023

No. 2 – Oklahoma City Thunder
- Position: Point guard / shooting guard
- League: NBA

Personal information
- Born: July 12, 1998 (age 28) Toronto, Ontario, Canada
- Listed height: 6 ft 6 in (1.98 m)
- Listed weight: 195 lb (88 kg)

Career information
- High school: St. Thomas More (Hamilton, Ontario, Canada); Sir Allan MacNab (Hamilton, Ontario, Canada); Hamilton Heights Christian Academy (Chattanooga, Tennessee, U.S.)
- College: Kentucky (2017–2018)
- NBA draft: 2018: 1st round, 11th overall pick
- Drafted by: Charlotte Hornets
- Playing career: 2018–present

Career history
- 2018–2019: Los Angeles Clippers
- 2019–present: Oklahoma City Thunder

Career highlights
- NBA champion (2025); NBA Finals MVP (2025); 2× NBA Most Valuable Player (2025, 2026); 4× NBA All-Star (2023–2026); 4× All-NBA First Team (2023–2026); NBA scoring champion (2025); NBA Western Conference finals MVP (2025); NBA All-Rookie Second Team (2019); Sports Illustrated Sportsperson of the Year (2025); 2× Lionel Conacher Award (2023, 2025); 2× Northern Star Award (2023, 2025); Second-team All-SEC (2018); SEC All-Freshman Team (2018); SEC tournament MVP (2018)
- Stats at NBA.com
- Stats at Basketball Reference
Medals
Men's basketball
Representing Canada
FIBA World Cup
Bronze medal – third place	2023 Philippines–Japan–Indonesia
FIBA Americas U18 Championship
Silver medal – second place	2016 Chile	Team

Shaivonte Aician Gilgeous-Alexander (/ˈʃeɪ/ SHAY; born July 12, 1998), also known by his initials SGA, is a Canadian professional basketball player for the Oklahoma City Thunder of the National Basketball Association (NBA). He is a four-time NBA All-Star, a four-time All-NBA First Team member, and two-time NBA Most Valuable Player (MVP). Gilgeous-Alexander led the Thunder to their first NBA championship since relocating from Seattle to Oklahoma City and was named Finals MVP.

Gilgeous-Alexander played one season of college basketball for the Kentucky Wildcats. He was selected 11th overall by the Charlotte Hornets in the first round of the 2018 NBA draft before being traded to the Los Angeles Clippers on draft night. Following his rookie season, he was traded to the Thunder in July 2019.

In the 2022–23 NBA season Gilgeous-Alexander was named to his first NBA All-Star Game and was voted to the All-NBA First Team, while finishing fourth in the league in scoring with 31.4 points per game. In the 2023–24 NBA season he finished second in MVP voting and third in the league in scoring with 30.1 points per game. In the 2024–25 NBA season, Gilgeous-Alexander won the NBA MVP award after leading the league in scoring with an average of 32.7 points per game. He later won the NBA Finals MVP award as the Thunder won the 2025 NBA Finals, becoming the fourth player in NBA history to win the MVP award, Finals MVP award, and scoring title all in the same season. In the 2025–26 NBA season he won his second league MVP award while finishing second in the league in scoring averaging 31.1 points per game.

With the Canada men's national basketball team, Gilgeous-Alexander won the bronze medal at the 2023 FIBA Basketball World Cup and was named to the All-Tournament Team. In 2023 and 2025 he received the Northern Star Award as Canada's Athlete of the Year. Gilgeous-Alexander was awarded Sports Illustrated Sportsperson of the Year in 2025.

== Early life ==
Gilgeous-Alexander was born on July 12, 1998, in Toronto, Ontario, and grew up in nearby Hamilton. His mother, Charmaine Gilgeous, is a former professional track athlete who competed in the women's 400 metres for Antigua and Barbuda at the 1992 Summer Olympics. His father, Vaughn Alexander, also of Antiguan descent, played high school basketball and won a Toronto city championship while attending Georges Vanier Secondary School in the early 1990s. Gilgeous-Alexander's father coached him during his youth. He began high school in Hamilton at St. Thomas More Catholic Secondary School before transferring to nearby Sir Allan MacNab Secondary School. He later moved to the United States and attended Hamilton Heights Christian Academy in Chattanooga, Tennessee, for his junior and senior years to improve his basketball skills, graduating in 2017.

== High school career ==
Gilgeous-Alexander initially attended St. Thomas More Catholic Secondary School in Hamilton, Ontario. In ninth grade, he did not make the school's junior team and subsequently played on the midget squad, where he was named team MVP and led St. Thomas More to the midget boys' city championship. Gilgeous-Alexander then transferred to nearby Sir Allan MacNab Secondary School before relocating to the United States in 2015 to attend Hamilton Heights Christian Academy in Chattanooga, Tennessee. "I just thought I needed to play better competition," he said. In his senior season, Gilgeous-Alexander averaged 18.4 points, 4.4 rebounds, and 4.0 assists per game.

In early 2016, he participated in the Basketball Without Borders development camp.

A four-star recruit according to ESPN, Gilgeous-Alexander verbally committed to play college basketball for the Florida Gators in November 2015 before decommitting in October 2016. His final five schools were Kansas, Kentucky, Syracuse, Texas, and UNLV. The following month, Gilgeous-Alexander announced his decision to play for the Kentucky Wildcats after signing his national letter of intent on November 14, 2016. He participated in the 2017 Kentucky Derby Festival Basketball Classic and was named the Most Valuable Player (MVP). At the 2017 Nike Hoop Summit, Gilgeous-Alexander represented the World Select Team and scored 11 points in 21 minutes of play.

== College career ==
Gilgeous-Alexander started the 2017–18 season with the Kentucky Wildcats as a reserve, sitting behind freshman point guard Quade Green, but still averaged over 30 minutes per game. After a loss to UCLA, Alexander recorded 24 points, five rebounds, and four assists against Louisville on December 29, 2017. When he first stepped on the University of Kentucky's campus, Gilgeous-Alexander had long hair. However, he cut his hair early in the season and some say this started his progression from sixth man to starting point guard. He continued to lead the team for the following two games, scoring 21 points against Georgia and 18 against LSU. He was a consistent contributor to a "struggling" Kentucky team that had a four-game losing streak during the season. He became a starter along with four other freshmen: Hamidou Diallo, Nick Richards, Kevin Knox II, and P. J. Washington. Despite their losses, his PPG shot up to 12.9 along with 3.8 rebounds and 4.6 assists. Gilgeous-Alexander had a great SEC tournament, earning Most Valuable Player (MVP) honours, and continued that momentum into the NCAA tournament. After playing great basketball in the first two rounds against Davidson and Buffalo, Kentucky lost to Kansas State in the Sweet 16. Gilgeous-Alexander's final college basketball moment was a missed three-point attempt at the buzzer. He concluded his freshman season and, consequently, his college career, having played 37 games with 24 starts, averaging 14.4 points, 4.1 rebounds, and 5.1 assists per game while shooting 48.5 percent from the field. After the 2017–18 season, Gilgeous-Alexander declared for the 2018 NBA draft on April 9, 2018.

== Professional career ==
=== Los Angeles Clippers (2018–2019) ===
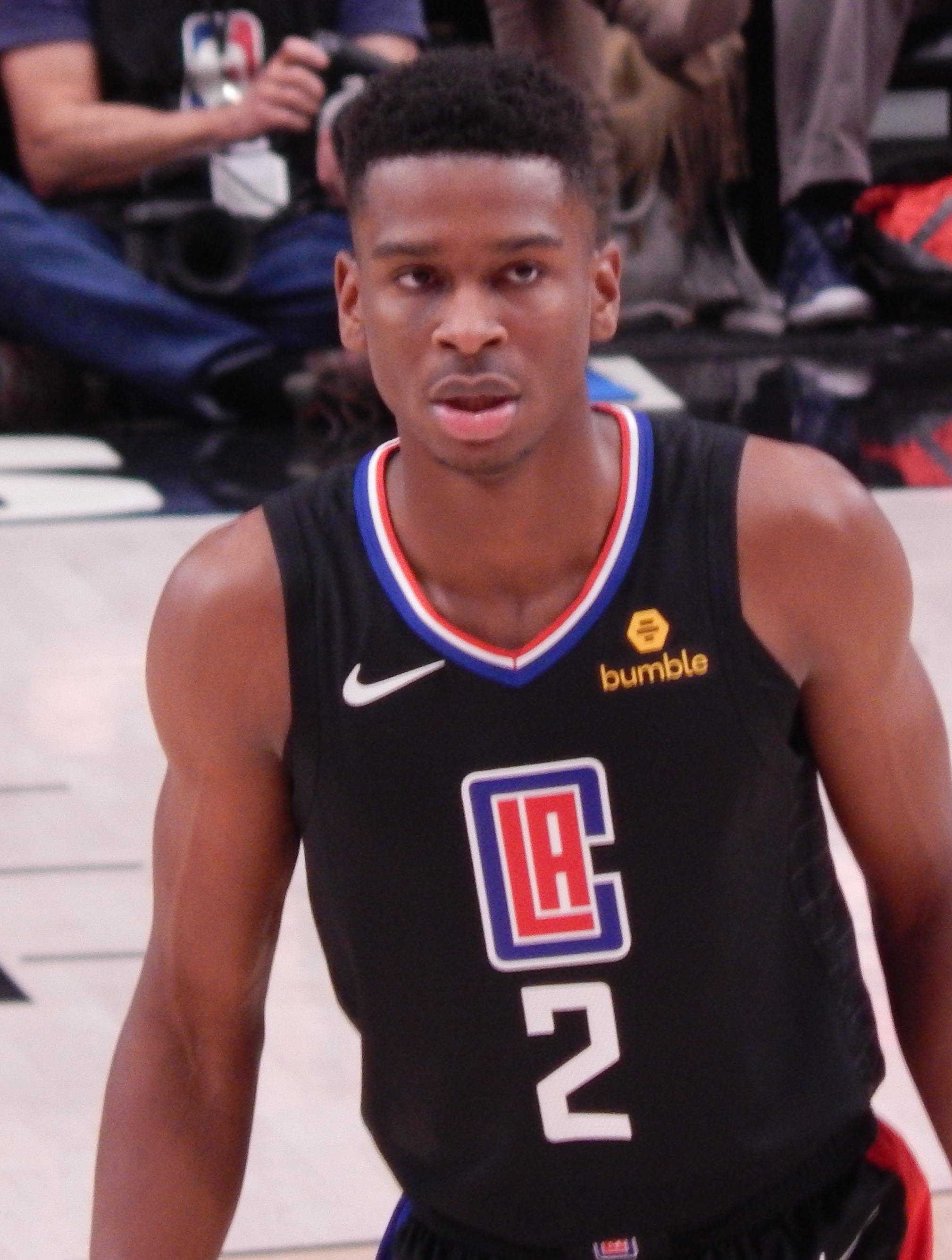
Gilgeous-Alexander with the Los Angeles Clippers in 2018

Gilgeous-Alexander was selected 11th overall by the Charlotte Hornets in the first round of the 2018 NBA draft on June 21, 2018. On draft night, he was traded to the Los Angeles Clippers in exchange for the 12th overall pick, Miles Bridges, and two future second-round picks.

Gilgeous-Alexander participated in the 2018 NBA Summer League with the Los Angeles Clippers in the Las Vegas Summer League. Starting all four of his games, he averaged 19.0 points, 4.8 rebounds, and 4.0 assists per game while shooting 45.8 percent from the field. With this performance, Gilgeous-Alexander became the first player in Las Vegas Summer League history to average at least 19.0 points, 4.0 assists, and 2.0 steals over a minimum of three appearances.

Gilgeous-Alexander scored a season-best 24 points in a 131–127 loss to the Portland Trail Blazers on December 17, 2018. He later matched this scoring mark on January 18, 2019, scoring 24 points in a 112–94 loss to the Golden State Warriors. Eleven days later, on January 29, he was selected for the World Team representing Canada in the 2019 Rising Stars Challenge. Gilgeous-Alexander finished his rookie season with an appearance in the 2019 NBA playoffs, where the Clippers were eliminated by the Golden State Warriors in six games during the Western Conference First Round. In Game 4 of the series on April 21, he recorded a then-career-high 25 points in a 113–105 loss to the Warriors.

=== Oklahoma City Thunder (2019–present) ===
==== 2019–20: Improving as a sophomore ====
The Los Angeles Clippers traded Gilgeous-Alexander along with Danilo Gallinari, five first-round draft picks, and the rights to swap two other first-round picks to the Oklahoma City Thunder in exchange for NBA All-Star Paul George on July 10, 2019. On October 8, Gilgeous-Alexander made his preseason debut with the Thunder against the Dallas Mavericks, recording 24 points and four rebounds in a 119–104 win. On December 22, Gilgeous-Alexander scored a then-career-high 32 points with five assists, three rebounds, and two steals in a 118–112 win over the Los Angeles Clippers. On January 13, 2020, Gilgeous-Alexander recorded his first career triple-double with 20 points, 10 assists, and a career-high 20 rebounds in a 117–104 win over the Minnesota Timberwolves. With this performance, he became the second player after Russell Westbrook to record a 20–20–10 statline in the last 30 years and the youngest ever to achieve it.

==== 2020–22: Breakthrough and injuries ====
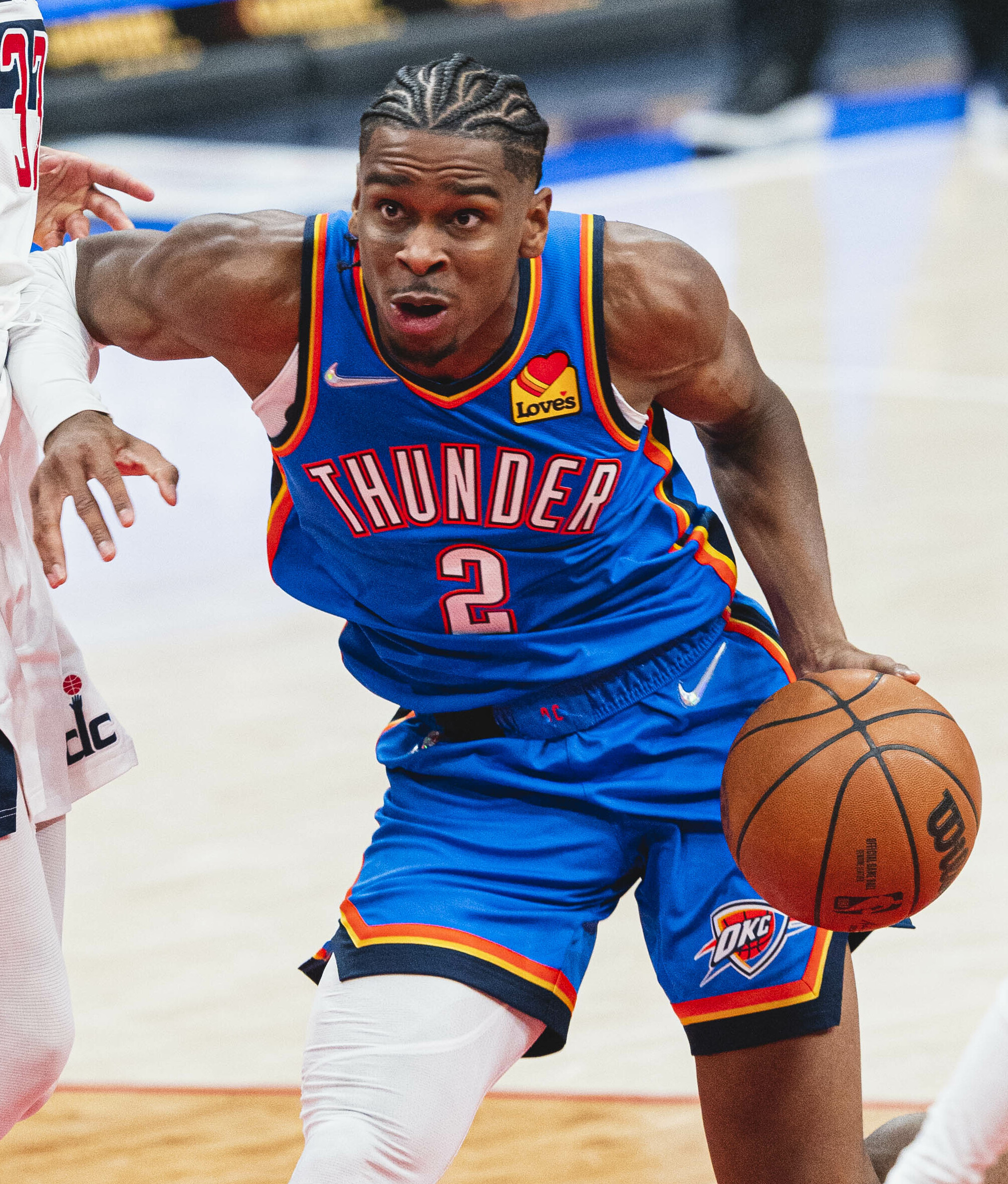
Gilgeous-Alexander with the Oklahoma City Thunder in January 2022

On December 26, 2020, Gilgeous-Alexander put up 24 points, seven rebounds, nine assists, and a game-winning jump shot in a 109–107 win against the Charlotte Hornets. On February 24, 2021, Gilgeous-Alexander scored a then-career-high 42 points to give the Thunder a 102–99 win over the San Antonio Spurs. On March 24, after playing 35 games, his season ended due to a tear in his plantar fascia.

On August 3, 2021, Gilgeous-Alexander and the Thunder agreed to a five-year, $172 million rookie extension.

On December 18, 2021, Gilgeous-Alexander scored 18 points and made a game-winning three-pointer at the buzzer to lift the Thunder over his former team, the Los Angeles Clippers, 104–103. Four days later, he recorded his second career triple-double, with 27 points, 11 rebounds and 12 assists, in a 108–94 victory over the Denver Nuggets. On December 27, Gilgeous-Alexander was named the NBA Western Conference Player of the Week for Week 10 (December 20–26), his first career NBA Player of the Week award. He led the Thunder to a 3–1 week with averages of 27.5 points, 6.3 rebounds and 7.0 assists. On March 28, 2022, Gilgeous-Alexander was ruled out for the rest of the season with an ankle injury. He finished the season with then-career highs of 24.5 points and 5.9 assists per game.

==== 2022–23: First All-Star and All-NBA First Team selection ====
On October 31, 2022, Gilgeous-Alexander was named the NBA Western Conference Player of the Week for Week 2 (October 24–30), his second career NBA Player of the Week award. He led the Thunder to an undefeated 3–0 week with averages of 31.7 points, 5.3 rebounds, and 7.7 assists. On November 16, Gilgeous-Alexander tied a then-career-high with 42 points, alongside a game-winning three-pointer, six rebounds and seven assists, in a 121–120 win over the Washington Wizards. On December 19, Gilgeous-Alexander put up 35 points alongside a buzzer-beating game-winner in a 123–121 win over the Portland Trail Blazers.

On February 2, 2023, Gilgeous-Alexander was named to his first-ever NBA All-Star Game as a reserve guard for the Western Conference. On February 4, he recorded 42 points, four rebounds, six assists, three steals, and two blocks in a 153–121 win over the Houston Rockets. On February 10, Gilgeous-Alexander recorded a then-career-high 44 points on 13-of-16 shooting from the field and 18-of-19 shooting from the free throw line in a 138–129 win over the Trail Blazers. He became the first player in Thunder history to score 40-plus points on 80 percent from the field. Gilgeous-Alexander ended the season with a then-career-high 31.4 points per game, joining Kevin Durant and Russell Westbrook as the only players in Thunder history to average at least 30 points per game in a season. Gilgeous-Alexander became the second guard in NBA history behind Michael Jordan to average at least 30 points, four rebounds, four assists, one steal, and one block while shooting at least 50 percent from the field. He subsequently became the youngest guard in NBA history to average 30 points on 50 percent from the field, beating Jordan's record. On May 2, Gilgeous-Alexander finished fifth in voting for the NBA Most Valuable Player (MVP). He was also named to his first All-NBA First Team.

==== 2023–24: MVP runner-up and best Western Conference record ====
On November 8, 2023, Gilgeous-Alexander scored 43 points on 15-of-22 shooting from the field and 12-of-13 from the free throw line in a 128–120 win over the Cleveland Cavaliers. On November 14, Gilgeous-Alexander put up 28 points and a career-high seven steals in a 123–87 win over the San Antonio Spurs. He also had his fifth straight game with 25 points on 55 percent from the field, the longest such streak in Thunder franchise history. On November 18, Gilgeous-Alexander recorded 40 points, seven rebounds, six assists, two steals and two blocks in a 130–123 overtime win over the Golden State Warriors. On December 16, Gilgeous-Alexander put up 25 points, six rebounds, eight assists, two steals, and a game-winning mid-range jump shot in a 118–117 win over the Denver Nuggets. On January 25, 2024, Gilgeous-Alexander was named a Western Conference starter for the 2024 NBA All-Star Game, marking his second consecutive selection and his first selection as a starter. On March 12, Gilgeous-Alexander recorded 30 points, 10 rebounds, and five assists in a 121–111 loss to the Indiana Pacers. This marked his 48th 30-point game of the season, surpassing Kevin Durant's previous Thunder franchise record of 47 for the most 30-point games in a season. Gilgeous-Alexander finished second in MVP voting and was selected to the All-NBA First Team for the second consecutive season. Led by his play, the Thunder won 57 games and entered the 2024 NBA playoffs as the Western Conference's top seed, their first time doing so since 2013.

In the playoffs, the Thunder swept the New Orleans Pelicans in four games in the Western Conference First Round to advance to the Western Conference Semifinals, the franchise's first appearance there since 2016. Gilgeous-Alexander finished Game 4 with 24 points and 10 rebounds. The Thunder lost to the Dallas Mavericks in six games despite Gilgeous-Alexander's then-playoff career-high 36 points, along with eight assists, two blocks, and zero turnovers in the 117–116 close-out loss in Game 6.

==== 2024–25: MVP season, scoring title, NBA championship, and Finals MVP ====
On November 11, 2024, Gilgeous-Alexander scored a then-career-high 45 points, along with three rebounds, nine assists, five steals and two blocks in a 134–128 win over his former team, the Los Angeles Clippers. On December 26, Gilgeous-Alexander tied his then-career-high with 45 points on 15-of-22 shooting, 4-of-5 from three, 11-of-11 from the free throw line, along with seven rebounds, eight assists, one steal and two blocks in a 120–114 win over the Indiana Pacers. During the month of December, Gilgeous-Alexander led the Thunder to a 12–1 record while averaging an NBA-best 33.3 points on 56.3 percent from the field to go along with 5.8 rebounds, 5.2 assists, 2.5 steals, and 1.2 blocks per game. He captured Player of the Month honours in back-to-back months for November and December.

On January 2, 2025, Gilgeous-Alexander led the Thunder to their 13th straight win, setting a new franchise record for most consecutive regular-season wins in the franchise's Oklahoma City era. On January 5, Gilgeous-Alexander recorded 33 points, 11 rebounds, six assists, three steals, and two blocks in a 105–92 win over the Boston Celtics. The victory marked the team's franchise-record 15th consecutive regular-season win. The previous record of 14 games had been set by the 1995–96 Seattle SuperSonics from February to March 1996. On January 22, Gilgeous-Alexander recorded a career-high 54 points, eight rebounds, five assists, three steals, and two blocks in a 123–114 win over the Utah Jazz. On January 25, Gilgeous-Alexander was named a Western Conference starter for the 2025 NBA All-Star Game, marking his third consecutive selection and his second selection in a row as a starter. On January 29, Gilgeous-Alexander scored 52 points in a 116–109 loss against the Golden State Warriors. On February 5, Gilgeous-Alexander scored 50 points along with eight rebounds, five assists, two steals, and one block in a 140–109 win over the Phoenix Suns. He became the ninth player in NBA history to score at least 50 points three times in a seven-game span.

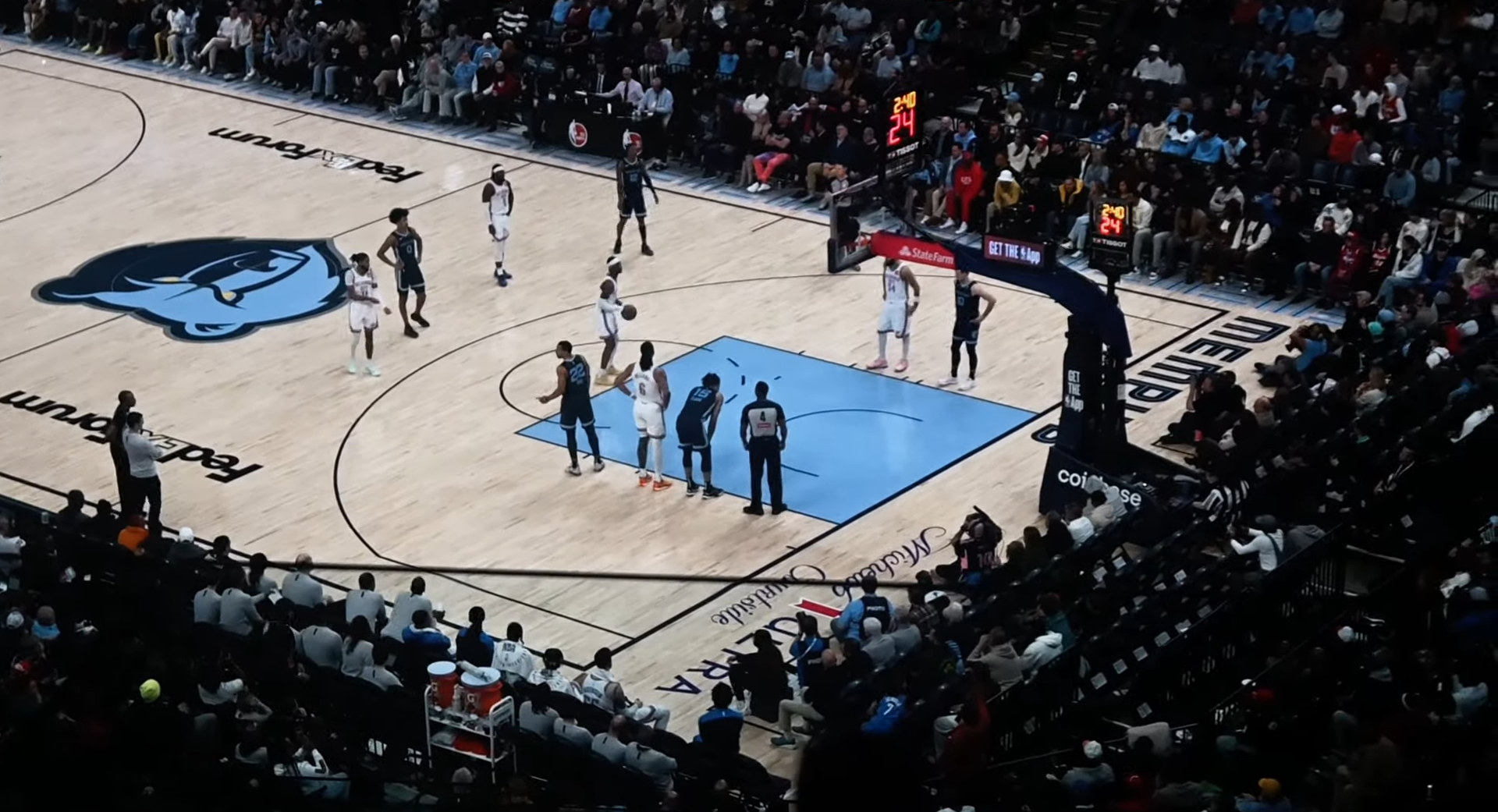
Gilgeous-Alexander attempting a free throw during a game against the Memphis Grizzlies in March 2025

On March 3, Gilgeous-Alexander scored 51 points, along with seven assists, five rebounds, one steal, and one block in a 137–128 win over the Houston Rockets. It was his fourth outing with at least 50 points that season. He tied Kevin Durant for second in franchise history, trailing only Russell Westbrook, who had five 50-point games while with the team. Gilgeous-Alexander also became just the 12th player in NBA history to achieve four (or more) games with at least 50 points in a single season. On March 12, Gilgeous-Alexander recorded 34 points, five rebounds, and seven assists in a 118–112 win over the Boston Celtics. He also became the fastest player in Thunder franchise history to achieve 10,000 career points, doing so in 368 games and surpassing the previous record set by Kevin Durant at 381 games. On March 25, Gilgeous-Alexander recorded 32 points, seven rebounds, and five assists in a 121–105 win over the Sacramento Kings. The performance marked his 65th consecutive game scoring 20 or more points, surpassing Kevin Durant's Thunder franchise record of 64 such games.

Gilgeous-Alexander finished the regular season as the first Canadian to lead the NBA in scoring and the third international player to achieve the feat. He finished the season with the most 20-point games (75), 30-point games (49), 40-point games (13) and 50-point games (4). His streak of 72 consecutive games scoring at least 20 points became the longest such streak since the 1960s, following Wilt Chamberlain (80 games), and Oscar Robertson (76 games). It was also Gilgeous-Alexander's third consecutive season averaging at least 30 points, joining a list occupied by Michael Jordan, Wilt Chamberlain, Oscar Robertson, Kareem Abdul-Jabbar, James Harden and Bob McAdoo. He was named the NBA Most Valuable Player (MVP) for the 2024–25 NBA season, becoming just the second Canadian to win the award, following Steve Nash who first claimed it in back-to-back seasons in 2005 and 2006. Gilgeous-Alexander also led the Thunder to the best record in franchise history at 68–14, tied for the fifth-best regular season record in NBA history.

In the playoffs, the Thunder swept the Memphis Grizzlies in four games in the Western Conference First Round to advance to the Western Conference Semifinals. On April 26, Gilgeous-Alexander scored a then-playoff career-high 38 points in Game 4, completing the four-game sweep in a 117–115 win over the Grizzlies. In Game 7 of the Western Conference Semifinals against the Denver Nuggets, Gilgeous-Alexander recorded 35 points, three rebounds, four assists, and three steals in a 125–93 win, securing his first Western Conference Finals appearance. He became the sixth player in NBA playoff history to record 35+ points and 0 turnovers in a Game 7. In Game 2 of the Western Conference Finals, Gilgeous-Alexander tied his then-playoff career-high with 38 points and added eight assists in a 118–103 victory over the Minnesota Timberwolves, leading the Thunder to a 2–0 series lead. With this performance, he became the first player in franchise history to record five consecutive 30-point games in the playoffs. On May 26, in Game 4 of the Western Conference Finals, Gilgeous-Alexander recorded a then playoff career-high 40 points, along with nine rebounds and 10 assists, narrowly missing a triple-double, as the Thunder secured a 128–126 victory over the Timberwolves to take a 3–1 series lead. After the Thunder won the series in five games, Gilgeous-Alexander was named the unanimous winner of the Western Conference Finals MVP. He averaged 31.4 points, 5.2 rebounds, 8.2 assists, and 1.8 steals per game en route to his first NBA Finals appearance and the Thunder's first since 2012. Gilgeous-Alexander also recorded his 10th 30-point, five-assist statline, making him one of only three players in NBA history to accomplish this feat at least 10 times in a single playoff run. The other two players to achieve this are Michael Jordan and LeBron James.

In Game 1 of the 2025 NBA Finals, Gilgeous-Alexander scored a game-high 38 points in a narrow 111–110 loss to the Indiana Pacers. His 38 points marked the third-most scored in an NBA Finals debut, behind only Allen Iverson's 48 points in 2001 and George Mikan's 42 points in 1949. In Game 2, he followed up with 34 points in a 123–107 victory over the Pacers. His first basket of the game made him the 12th player in NBA history to reach 3,000 combined points in the regular season and playoffs. His 72 combined points across the first two games set a record for the most by any player in their first two Finals games, surpassing Iverson's previous mark of 71 points from 2001. In Game 5, Gilgeous-Alexander recorded 31 points, 10 assists, and four blocks in a 120–109 victory that gave the Thunder a 3–2 series lead. With this performance, he recorded his 12th postseason game with at least 30 points and 5 assists, setting a new NBA record for the most such games in a single playoff run. He surpassed the previous mark of 11, held jointly by Michael Jordan and LeBron James. Gilgeous-Alexander also became one of only four NBA players to have 15 or more 30-point games in a single postseason run. The other three players on that list are Michael Jordan (1992), Hakeem Olajuwon (1995), and Kobe Bryant (2009). The Thunder defeated the Pacers 103–91 in Game 7 to win the series 4–3, with Gilgeous-Alexander named NBA Finals MVP, becoming the first Canadian to earn the honor. He became the fourth player in NBA history, after Kareem Abdul-Jabbar, Michael Jordan, and Shaquille O'Neal, to achieve the distinction of winning the MVP award, Finals MVP award, and scoring title all in the same season.

==== 2025–26: Back-to-back MVPs and Clutch Player of the Year ====
Gilgeous-Alexander agreed to a record four-year, $285 million extension with the Thunder on July 1, 2025. He began the 2025–26 season with record-breaking performances. In the season opener against the Houston Rockets on October 21, Gilgeous-Alexander scored 35 points and made a pair of game-winning free throws in a 125–124 double-overtime victory. In the following game, a rematch of the 2025 NBA Finals against the Indiana Pacers on October 23, he recorded career highs of 55 points and 23 free throws made out of 26 attempted, while adding eight rebounds, five assists, and two steals in a 141–135 double-overtime win. This made the Thunder the first team in NBA history to play double overtime in the first two games of a season. His 55 points were the third-highest in franchise history since the team's relocation from Seattle to Oklahoma City in 2008, and tied Russell Westbrook for the most 50-point games in franchise history with five. Across these two games, his combined 40 free throw attempts set an NBA record for most attempts through the first two games of a season, while his combined 90 points ranked fifth most in NBA history through the first two games of a season, trailing only Wilt Chamberlain, Anthony Davis, and Michael Jordan.

Gilgeous-Alexander recorded a double-double with 30 points and 12 assists in a 126–107 victory over the Los Angeles Clippers on November 4. This performance marked his 80th consecutive game scoring 20 or more points, surpassing Oscar Robertson’s streak to become the third-longest in NBA history. It also contributed to the Thunder's franchise record for the longest season-opening winning streak of 8–0. On November 30, Gilgeous-Alexander scored 26 points in a 123–115 win over the Portland Trail Blazers. On December 10, Gilgeous-Alexander led the Thunder to the longest winning streak in franchise history at 16 games, following a 138–89 win over the Phoenix Suns, while guiding the team to a 24–1 record, tying the best start to a regular season in NBA history alongside the 2015–16 Golden State Warriors. The Thunder also posted the largest scoring differential through 25 games ever at +17.5 points per game. On December 13, the historic streak came to an end in a narrow 111–109 loss to the San Antonio Spurs. On December 22, Gilgeous-Alexander recorded 31 points, 10 rebounds, and eight assists in a 119–103 victory over the Memphis Grizzlies. It was his 100th consecutive 20-point game, joining Wilt Chamberlain as the only players to achieve such a feat in NBA history. On January 2, 2026, Gilgeous-Alexander was named Western Conference Player of the Month for games played in December after he led the Thunder to a 9–4 record, averaging 31.4 points, 4.6 rebounds, and 6.1 assists per game while shooting 59.4 percent from the field. It was his fifth career Player of the Month honours.

On January 7, 2026, Gilgeous-Alexander hit a mid-range jumper at the buzzer to force overtime against the Utah Jazz. He finished the game with 46 points, six rebounds, and six assists, leading the Thunder to a 129–125 overtime victory. On January 21, Gilgeous-Alexander recorded 40 points, seven rebounds, and 11 assists on 16-of-19 shooting in a 122–102 win over the Milwaukee Bucks. In the process, he joined Chamberlain (three times) as the only players in NBA history to record 40+ points, 10+ assists, and 5+ rebounds on at least 80% shooting from the field in a game. On March 9, Gilgeous-Alexander recorded 35 points, nine rebounds, and a career-high 15 assists, and hit a game-winning three-pointer, in a 129–126 win over the Denver Nuggets. Three days later, he scored 35 points in a 104–102 win over the Boston Celtics. With these performances, he broke Wilt Chamberlain's record for the most consecutive 20-point games. For the regular season, Gilgeous-Alexander won his second consecutive NBA Most Valuable Player (MVP) award, becoming the 14th player in NBA history to win the award in back-to-back years, and also earned his first-ever NBA Clutch Player of the Year award. He also became the first guard in NBA history to average at least 30 points on at least 55% shooting from the field in a season.

Oklahoma City went into the 2026 NBA playoffs as 1st seed in the Western Conference. In the first round, they swept the Phoenix Suns, and in Game 3, Gilgeous-Alexander put up a playoff career-high 42 points on 15-of-18 shooting, along with eight assists. He became only the second NBA player to score 40 or more points on at least 83.3% shooting in a playoff game. The Thunder then swept the Los Angeles Lakers in the Western Conference Semifinals. In Game 4, Gilgeous-Alexander recorded 35 points and eight assists to lead the Thunder to a 115–110 win, making them the 11th team to sweep the first two rounds of the NBA Playoffs. The game marked his 26th 30-point playoff game in his Thunder career, tying Russell Westbrook for second-most in franchise history. Gilgeous-Alexander and the Thunder were eliminated by the San Antonio Spurs in seven games in the Western Conference Finals. In the decisive Game 7, Gilgeous-Alexander recorded a game-high 35 points and a game-high 9 assists in a 111–103 loss.

==== 2026–27 ====
On October 22, 2026, Gilgeous-Alexander put up 17 points on 6-of-19 shooting from the field in a 96–84 win over the Denver Nuggets. His record for the most consecutive 20-point games in NBA history ended at 141 games.

== National team career ==
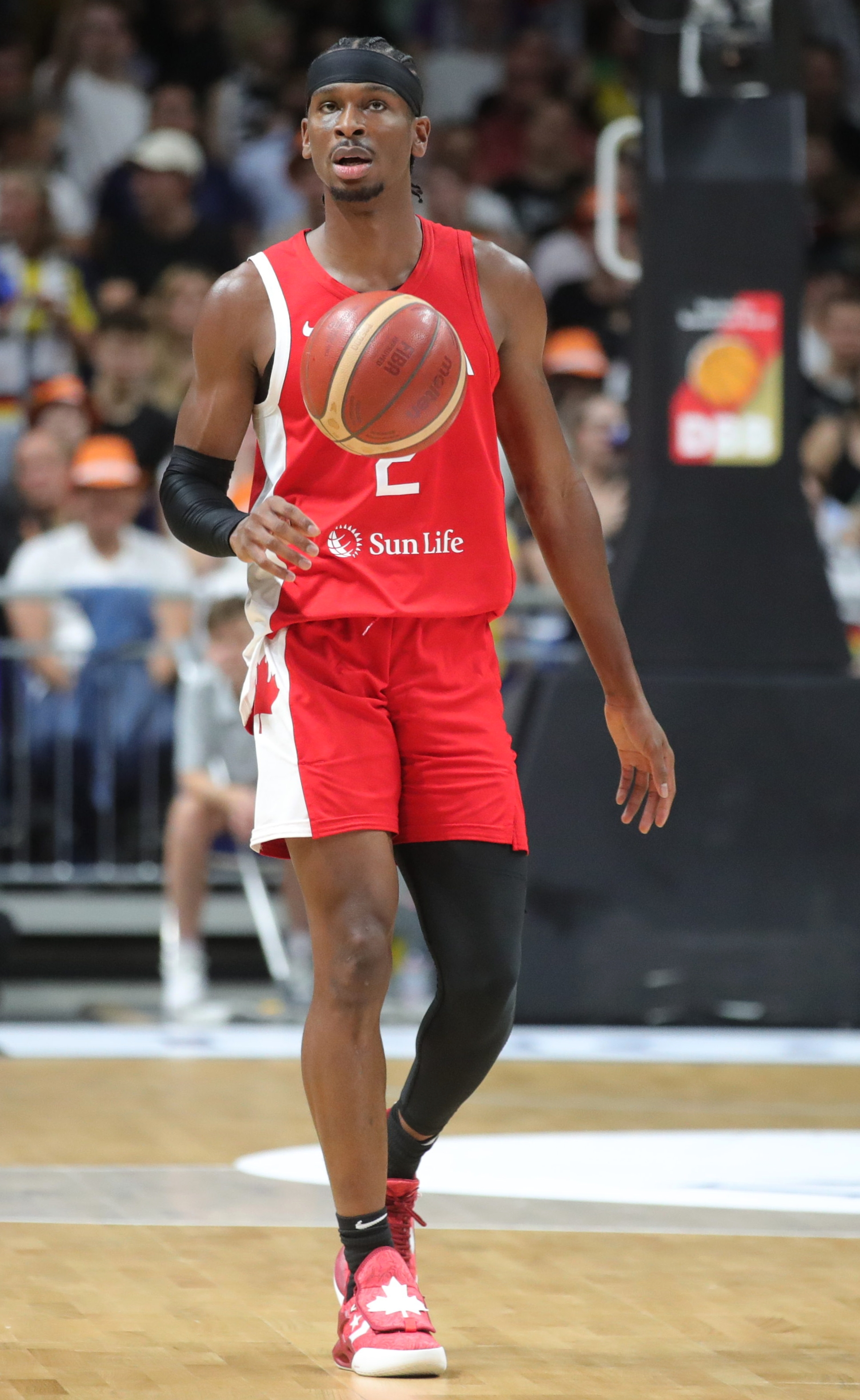
Gilgeous-Alexander with Team Canada in 2023

Gilgeous-Alexander represented the Canada men's junior national basketball team at the 2016 FIBA Americas Under-18 Championship in Valdivia, Chile. He played in all five games of the tournament, averaging 7.8 points, 4.0 rebounds, and 5.4 assists per game while shooting 39.4 percent from the field. The team won the silver medal following a 99–84 loss to the United States in the final. Later that year, Gilgeous-Alexander joined the senior men's national basketball team for the 2016 FIBA World Olympic Qualifying Tournament in Manila, Philippines. Canada lost to France in the final and failed to qualify for the 2016 Summer Olympics.

Gilgeous-Alexander was one of 14 players to agree to a three-year commitment to play with the national team on May 24, 2022, aiming to break a decades-long trend of failing to qualify for the Olympic basketball tournament. At the 2023 FIBA Basketball World Cup, Gilgeous-Alexander was the central figure on the Canadian roster, leading them on a historic deep run. They qualified to the quarter-finals of the tournament on September 3, in the process securing a berth at the 2024 Summer Olympics, which he called "almost indescribable." The team ultimately won the bronze medal after defeating the United States in the third-place game. This was Canada's first ever World Cup medal, and first medal at a major global tournament since the 1936 Summer Olympics. In recognition of his individual play, Gilgeous-Alexander was named to the All-Tournament Team. For both this and his feats in the NBA in 2023, he received the Northern Star Award as Canada's Athlete of the Year and the Lionel Conacher Award as the Canadian Press' choice for Canadian Male Athlete of the Year. Gilgeous-Alexander was only the second basketball player to receive the two honours, in both cases after Steve Nash. He would again receive the honour in 2025.

Gilgeous-Alexander was named to Canada's roster for the 2024 Summer Olympics in Paris. After a strong unbeaten performance in the group stage, which was deemed the "group of death" by experts, Canada was surprisingly eliminated in the quarterfinals by hosts France. Gilgeous-Alexander was named to the tournament's All-Second Team after averaging 21.0 points, 4.3 rebounds, and 4.0 assists per game.

== Player profile ==
Listed at 6 feet 6 inches (1.98 m) tall and weighing 195 pounds (88.5 kg), Gilgeous-Alexander is a combo guard known for his ability to slash through defenses and score on all three levels. His 6-foot 11 inch (2.11 m) wingspan, body control, speed, and embrace of defensive contact make him one of the best slashers in the history of the NBA, boasting a 68 percent career field goal percentage within three feet of the basket.

Gilgeous-Alexander is regarded as a two-way player: he earned All-Defensive Team votes from 2023 to 2026 and placed 7th in the voting for the 2024 Defensive Player of the Year Award.

Gilgeous-Alexander has earned widespread praise across the NBA for his leadership, work ethic, and maturity. Former teammates Patrick Beverley and Chris Paul recognized his relentless work ethic and dedication to the game from beginning of his career, with Beverley comparing Gilgeous-Alexander's mindset to the likes of Kobe Bryant and Michael Jordan. Thunder head coach Mark Daigneault has praised Gilgeous-Alexander for his composure and selflessness, highlighting how he leads by example on and off the court.

Gilgeous-Alexander has faced heavy fan criticism on social media for his high free throw numbers and tendency to embellish contact when driving. He led the NBA in total free throws made from the 2022–23 season to the 2024–25 season, though he has never led in free throws attempted. Former NBA player Richard Jefferson addressed the narrative of Gilgeous-Alexander being a "free-throw merchant" to discredit his offensive prowess, saying, "Shai is one of the most impressive people that I've ever talked to. I asked him about the free throws, and he's like, 'Yeah. You know what's crazy about it is that two years ago, I averaged almost 11 free throws a game but we finished 10th and no one cared. When I wasn't sending their best favorite player home when I wasn't sending their team home, then no one cared that I was shooting 11 free throws a night and scoring this amount of points.' To me, this is the type of sickos that we love."

== Awards and honors ==
NBA

- NBA champion: 2025
- NBA Finals MVP: 2025
- 2× NBA Most Valuable Player: 2025, 2026
- 4× NBA All-Star: 2023–2026
- 4× All-NBA First Team: 2023–2026
- 2× NBA Cup All-Tournament Team: 2024, 2025
- NBA All-Rookie Second Team: 2019
- NBA Western Conference finals MVP: 2025
- NBA scoring champion: 2025
- 3× NBA free throw scoring leaders: 2024, 2025, 2026
- NBA Clutch Player of the Year: 2026

College

- Second-team All-SEC: 2018
- SEC All-Freshman Team: 2018
- SEC tournament MVP: 2018

Canada Basketball

- Olympics All-Second Team: 2024
- FIBA World Cup bronze medalist: 2023
- FIBA Basketball World Cup All-Tournament Team: 2023
- FIBA Americas U18 Championship silver medalist: 2016
- 2× Lionel Conacher Award: 2023, 2025
- 2× Northern Star Award: 2023, 2025

Other

- Sports Illustrated Sportsperson of the Year: 2025
- Best Male Athlete ESPY Award: 2025
- Best NBA Player ESPY Award: 2025

== Career statistics ==
Legend
GP	Games played	GS	Games started	MPG	Minutes per game
FG%	Field goal percentage	3P%	3-point field goal percentage	FT%	Free throw percentage
RPG	Rebounds per game	APG	Assists per game	SPG	Steals per game
BPG	Blocks per game	PPG	Points per game	**Bold**	Career high
†	Won an NBA championship	*	Led the league

=== NBA ===
==== Regular season ====
Year	Team	GP	GS	MPG	FG%	3P%	FT%	RPG	APG	SPG	BPG	PPG
2018–19	L.A. Clippers	**82***	73	26.5	.476	.367	.800	2.8	3.3	1.2	.5	10.8
2019–20	Oklahoma City	70	70	34.7	.471	.347	.807	**5.9**	3.3	1.1	.7	19.0
2020–21	Oklahoma City	35	35	33.7	.508	**.418**	.808	4.7	5.9	.8	.7	23.7
2021–22	Oklahoma City	56	56	34.7	.453	.300	.810	5.0	5.9	1.3	.8	24.5
2022–23	Oklahoma City	68	68	**35.5**	.510	.345	**.905**	4.8	5.5	1.6	1.0	31.4
2023–24	Oklahoma City	75	75	34.0	.535	.353	.874	5.5	6.2	**2.0**	.9	30.1
2024–25†	Oklahoma City	76	**76**	34.2	.519	.375	.898	5.0	6.4	1.7	**1.0**	**32.7***
2025–26	Oklahoma City	68	68	33.2	**.553**	.386	.879	4.3	**6.6**	1.4	.8	31.1
Career		530	521	33.1	.508	.360	.864	4.7	5.3	1.4	.8	25.3
All-Star		3	2	16.9	.733	.688	.500	3.0	4.7	.3	.3	18.7

==== Playoffs ====
Year	Team	GP	GS	MPG	FG%	3P%	FT%	RPG	APG	SPG	BPG	PPG
2019	L.A. Clippers	6	6	28.8	.467	**.500**	.850	2.7	3.2	1.0	.8	13.7
2020	Oklahoma City	7	7	39.9	.433	.400	**.957**	5.3	4.1	1.0	.4	16.3
2024	Oklahoma City	10	10	**39.9**	**.496**	.432	.790	**7.2**	6.4	1.3	**1.7**	**30.2**
2025†	Oklahoma City	**23***	**23***	37.0	.462	.283	.876	5.3	6.5	**1.7**	.9	29.9
2026	Oklahoma City	15	15	36.3	.463	.305	.892	2.9	**7.9**	1.3	.9	27.6
Career		61	61	36.8	.467	.340	.869	4.8	6.2	1.4	1.0	26.2

=== College ===
Year	Team	GP	GS	MPG	FG%	3P%	FT%	RPG	APG	SPG	BPG	PPG
2017–18	Kentucky	37	24	33.7	.485	.404	.817	4.1	5.1	1.6	.5	14.4

== Endorsements ==
Gilgeous-Alexander signed an endorsement deal with Converse on July 8, 2020. According to the Netflix docuseries Power Moves with Shaquille O'Neal, O'Neal attempted to sign Gilgeous-Alexander to Reebok as his initial shoe contract was set to expire at the conclusion of the 2023–24 NBA season. However, Gilgeous-Alexander ultimately re-signed with Converse on a lucrative multi-year contract extension and was named Creative Director of Converse Basketball. In this role, he had creative input across all basketball product designs and the opportunity to launch his own signature sneaker line, beginning with the SHAI 001, which was released on September 4, 2025. On June 16, 2026, it was announced that Gilgeous-Alexander had left Converse to sign with its parent company Nike.

== Legal issues ==
Gilgeous-Alexander purchased a lakefront property in Burlington, Ontario, in May 2023, which had previously been occupied by bankrupt cryptocurrency trader Aiden Pleterski. Within days of moving in, Gilgeous-Alexander and his partner vacated the residence due to ongoing security concerns related to Pleterski's highly publicized fraud and bankruptcy case, which had led to threats and repeated visits from investors seeking Pleterski. Gilgeous-Alexander subsequently filed a lawsuit to rescind the purchase, alleging that the seller, who had leased the property to Pleterski, failed to disclose the property's connection to the trader and the associated safety risks. The court ruled in favour of Gilgeous-Alexander, finding fraudulent misrepresentation on the part of the seller and awarded him damages for mortgage and insurance payments incurred. Consequently, the purchase was reversed, and the seller's appeal was denied. The case set a precedent in Ontario real estate law by expanding the scope of required property disclosures to include latent safety risks beyond the physical condition of the property.

Gilgeous-Alexander's home in Nichols Hills, Oklahoma, was burglarized while he was at the Paycom Center in downtown Oklahoma City, playing the Washington Wizards on October 30, 2025.

== Personal life ==
Gilgeous-Alexander is of Antiguan descent. He has one sibling, a younger brother named Thomasi Gilgeous-Alexander, who played college basketball for the Evansville Purple Aces and Northeastern Oklahoma A&M NEO. Gilgeous-Alexander's first cousin, Nickeil Alexander-Walker, is an NBA player for the Atlanta Hawks. The two share a close relationship, having lived together at their high school coach Zach Ferrell's house. Gilgeous-Alexander married his high school sweetheart, Hailey Summers, on February 14, 2024. Summers gave birth to their son, named Ares, on April 25, 2024.

Gilgeous-Alexander is considered a hometown hero in Hamilton. On August 7, 2025, the city held "Shai Rally Day" at Hamilton Stadium to celebrate his accomplishments. Hamilton mayor Andrea Horwath presented him with the Key to the City, and they announced the installation of commemorative "Shai Gilgeous-Alexander Way" street signs along Mohawk Road, the neighbourhood where he grew up. He was also honored during halftime of that day's Hamilton Tiger-Cats game, where he wore a custom #2 Tiger-Cats jersey. In February 2026, Gilgeous-Alexander joined the ownership group of the TD Coliseum in his hometown of Hamilton following the arena's renovation, and the atrium is named after his son Ares with a planned mural.

Gilgeous-Alexander is also an avid fan of hip-hop music; he stated in his Billboard interview that “music has always been a huge part of my life,” On November 12, 2026, it was announced that Gilgeous-Alexander had collaborated with Spotify and became the app's first Guest Editor. To commemorate this, Gilgeous-Alexander uploaded a 50-track "Heat Check" playlist which has appearances from artists such as Yeat, Summrs, Nine Vicious, Ken Carson, Protect, OsamaSon, and Drake, among others, where the latter was credited as the GOAT rapper of all time by Gilgeous-Alexander.

== See also ==
- List of NBA single-season scoring leaders
- List of NBA career free throw percentage leaders
