= St. Thomas More Catholic Secondary School =

Canadian Catholic secondary school

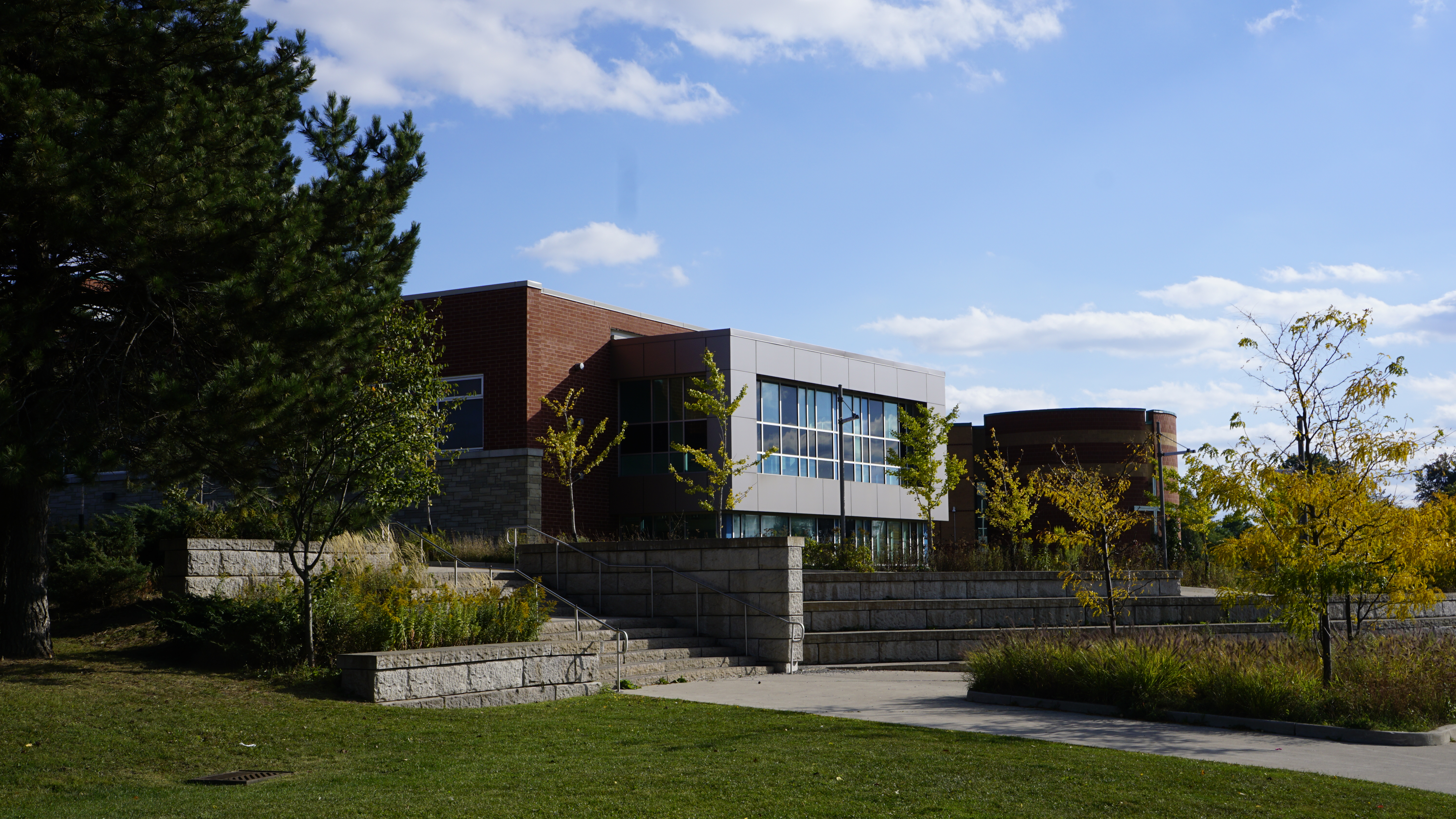

Location
- 1045 Upper Paradise Road; Hamilton, Ontario, L9B 2N4; Canada; 43°12′49″N 79°55′09″W

Information
- School type: Public, separate secondary school
- Motto: Praestantia Scholastica, Praestantia Religiosa, Praestantia Athletica (Scholastic excellence, religious excellence, athletic excellence)
- Religious affiliation: Catholic
- Opened: September 1972; 54 years ago
- School board: Hamilton-Wentworth Catholic District School Board
- Superintendent: Jacques Beth
- Area trustee: John Valvasori
- School number: 855685
- Principal: Paul Zabolotnikov
- Chaplain: Maciej Blok
- Grades: 9–12
- Enrolment: 2,055 (2020)
- Colours: Black and gold
- Mascot: Tommy the Knight
- Website: Official website

St. Thomas More Catholic Secondary School is a Catholic secondary school located in Hamilton, Ontario. It is a part of the Hamilton-Wentworth Catholic District School Board and is located on the west side of the Hamilton Mountain. It serves the south-west of Hamilton as well as parts of Glanbrook and Ancaster.

It is the largest secondary school in Hamilton, holding over 2,250 students and graduates approximately 400 students each year, with around 90% of graduates going on to pursue post-secondary education. The school's 200 member staff are involved in numerous activities, sports and associations.

== Athletics ==
The school prides itself on its athletics as it has over 70 teams that have each won a championship at least once in the school's history. The biggest teams are the football, basketball, hockey, track and field, baseball and soccer teams. STM also has many teams and clubs not found in most schools, like girls' hockey and slo-pitch teams as well as field hockey teams and rugby sevens.

== Uniforms ==
St. Thomas More's school colours are black and gold. The school has strict rules and consequences for violations in school dress code. There are some exceptional days (during an important game, celebration or holiday), where students can wear specially designed "spirit wear". Designs ranging from clothes representing school clubs and teams to clothes featuring the school mascot (STM Knights).

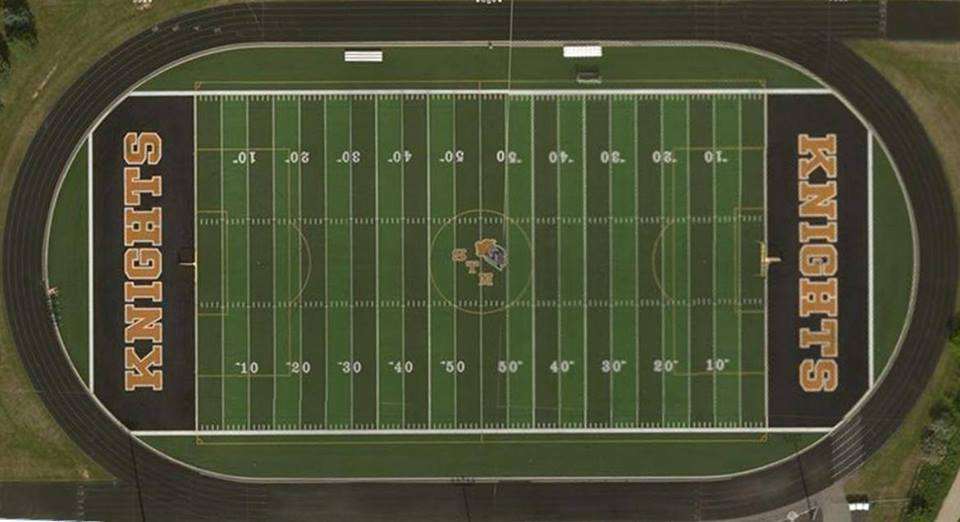
Overhead view of main athletic field at STM.

== Sports ==
=== Football ===
The St. Thomas More Knights won their first junior football championship in 1975 and their first senior championship in 1984. The team has won 13 junior championships, in 1975, 1997, 1999, 2000, 2009, 2012–2016, 2018, 2019, and 2021. It has also won 13 senior varsity league championships, in 1984, 2000, 2001, 2006–2008, 2010, 2014, and 2016–2019 and 2021. The Senior Knights are consistently among the highest ranked football teams in Canada. They have also won 7 OFSAA Bowl Championships (2006, 2007, 2015, 2016, 2017, 2018, 2019).

In 2007, 2017, 2018, and 2019 they were ranked the #1 high school football team in Canada and became the first school to ever be ranked #1 in Canada three years in a row, never losing their #1 rank in that entire span.

=== Girls' basketball ===
St. Thomas More has an accomplished history in girls' basketball at the provincial senior varsity level. The program won league titles in 1988, 1989, 1991, 1994, 2003, 2004, 2007, 2008, 2013 and 2014 as well as capturing 4 OFSAA "AAAA" gold medals in 2004, 2011, 2012, and 2013. Their long-time, main league rival is St. Mary CSS, who is also considered to be an elite level program with multiple OFSAA titles.

== Notable alumni ==
- Nicole Arbour – comedian, actress, and YouTuber
- Ian Bennett – professional indoor soccer player
- David Braid – jazz pianist and composer
- Ben Chiarot - NHL Player
- Michael Chris-Ike – CFL running back, Winnipeg Blue Bombers
- Shai Gilgeous-Alexander – professional basketball player for the Oklahoma City Thunder
- Robert Heppenstall - track & field athlete
- Colin Jenkins – Canadian Olympian 2008 Olympic Games Triathlon
- Ashley Leggat – actress
- Brent Monson – Calgary Stampeders defensive coordinator
- Darnell Nurse – Edmonton Oilers
- Kia Nurse – Canada women's national basketball team
- Ryan Raposo – professional soccer player who most recently played for LAFC
- Anthony Romaniw – Canadian Olympian (800m)
- Alena Sharp – LPGA Tour
- Theo Corbeanu – La Liga- soccer player

== See also ==
- Education in Ontario
- List of secondary schools in Ontario
