= Michael Chris-Ike =

Canadian football player (born 1999)

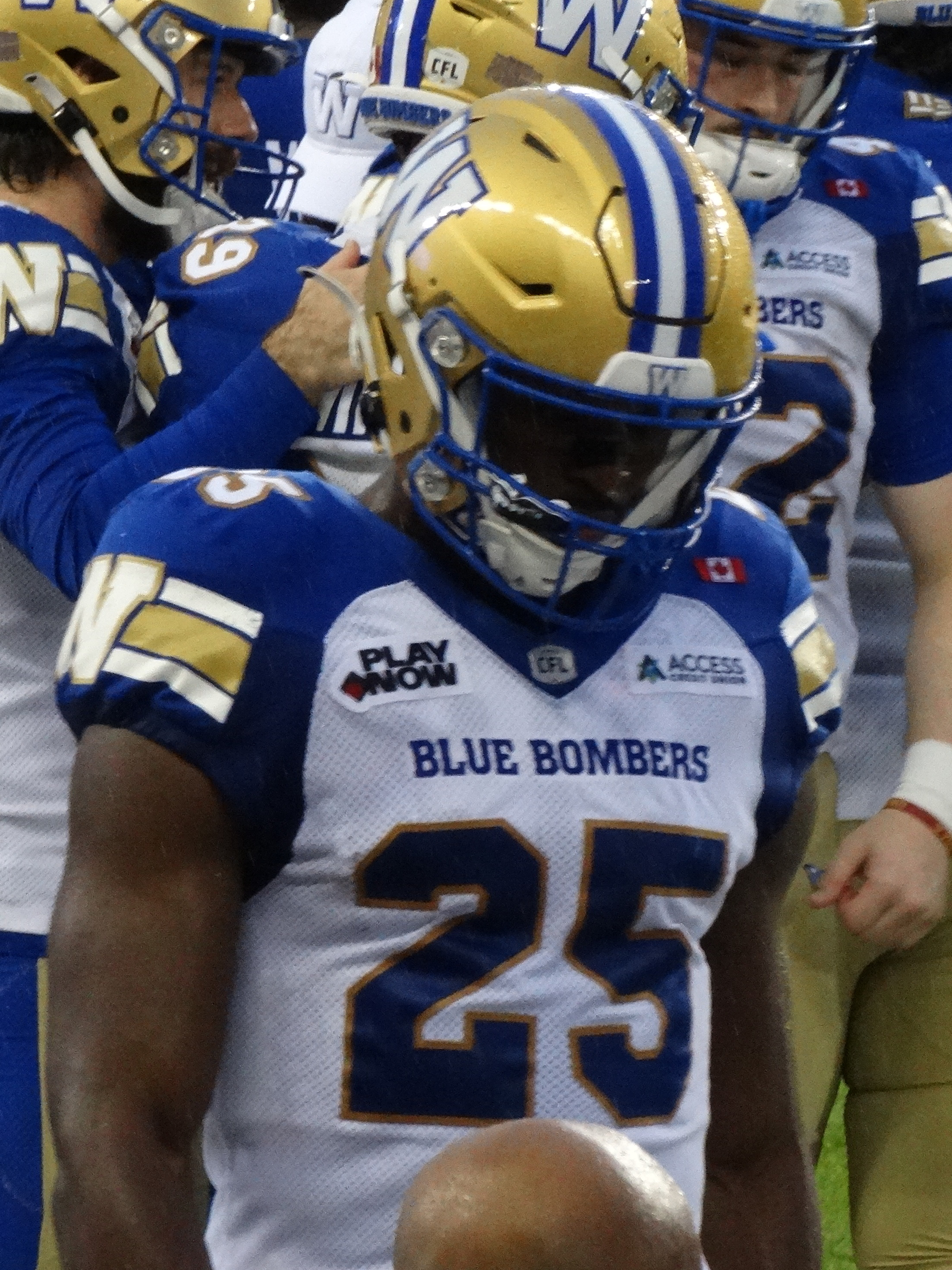
- Chris-Ike with the Winnipeg Blue Bombers in 2025

No. 25 – Winnipeg Blue Bombers
- Position: Running back
- Roster status: Active
- CFL status: National

Personal information
- Born: January 2, 1999 (age 27)
- Listed height: 6 ft 1 in (1.85 m)
- Listed weight: 228 lb (103 kg)

Career information
- High school: St. Thomas More (Hamilton, ON)
- College: Delaware State (2018–2023)
- CFL draft: 2024: 2nd round, 14th overall pick

Career history
- Winnipeg Blue Bombers (2024–present)
- Stats at CFL.ca

Michael Chris-Ike (born January 2, 1999) is a Canadian professional football running back for the Winnipeg Blue Bombers of the Canadian Football League (CFL). He played college football at Delaware State.

== Early life ==
Chris-Ike played high school football at St. Thomas More Catholic Secondary School in Hamilton, Ontario. His senior year, he helped St. Thomas More earn a 10–0 record and become the No. 1 ranked high school football team in Canada. He rushed for over 1,000 yards and 12 touchdowns in five regular season games. He then totaled over 1,700 all-purpose yards in four postseason games, including rushing for 336 yards and five touchdowns in the OFSAA Golden Horseshoe Bowl.

== College career ==
Chris-Ike played college football for the Delaware State Hornets from 2018 to 2023. He played in four games his freshman year, rushing for 238 yards and two touchdowns. He did not appear in any games in 2019 and was redshirted. The 2020 season was moved to spring 2021 due to the COVID-19 pandemic. Chris-Ike only appeared in two games during the COVID-19 shortened 2020 season. He played in 10 games in 2021, rushing for 262 yards and three touchdowns. He was also named an MEAC Academic All-Star that season. Chris-Ike rushed for 135 yards in three games in 2022, and 90 yards in 11 games in 2023.

== Professional career ==
Pre-draft measurables
Height	Weight	40-yard dash	20-yard shuttle	Three-cone drill	Vertical jump	Broad jump	Bench press
6 ft 1 in (1.85 m)	225 lb (102 kg)	4.51 s	4.19 s	6.71 s	35.5 in (0.90 m)	10 ft 2 1/4 in (3.11 m)	16 reps
All values from CFL Combine

At the 2024 CFL Combine, Chris-Ike tied for first in the 40-yard dash (4.51 seconds) with Ben Labrosse. Chris-Ike also finished first in the three-cone drill (6.71 s). After going undrafted in the 2024 NFL draft, he attended rookie minicamp on a tryout basis with both the New York Jets and New Orleans Saints.

Chris-Ike was selected by the Winnipeg Blue Bombers in the second round, with the 14th overall pick, of the 2024 CFL draft. He officially signed with the team on May 13, 2024.
