= Sir Allan MacNab Secondary School =

Location
- 145 Magnolia Drive; Hamilton, Ontario, L9C 5P4; Canada; 43°13′53″N 79°55′21″W

Information
- School type: Public, High school
- Motto: Latin: A bonis ad meliora (From good to better)
- Opened: 1969
- School board: Hamilton-Wentworth District School Board
- Superintendent: Adnan Shahbaz
- Area trustee: Becky Buck
- School number: 941719
- Principal: Jesse Zsiros
- Grades: 9 to 12
- Enrolment: 873 (January 2016)
- Language: English
- Colours: Blue, orange
- Mascot: Allan the lion
- Team name: Lions

Sir Allan MacNab Secondary School is located at 145 Magnolia Drive in Hamilton, Ontario, Canada, and is a member of the Hamilton-Wentworth District School Board. Sir Allan MacNab Secondary School opened in 1969 and as of January 2016 has 873 students. The school was founded in 1969 and is named for Sir Allan MacNab, the last Premier of Upper Canada before Confederation and a resident, lawyer and politician in Hamilton from 1826 until his death in 1862 at his home, Dundurn Castle. Located on the west mountain of Hamilton, the school catchment area extends into Glanbrook and Ancaster.

== Notable alumni ==
- Shai Gilgeous-Alexander – basketball player, NBA
- Ashley Leggat – Canadian actress
- Mark Anthony Graham – Canadian Olympic track and field athlete
- Kurtis Conner – internet personality
- Jennifer Keesmaat – former chief planner, City of Toronto (2012-2017)
- Aubrey Cummings – former CFL player and Grey Cup Champion with the Calgary Stampeders 1998
- Tyler Ternowski – Canadian football player
- Daryl Waud – Canadian football player
- Quincy Vaughn – Canadian football player

== See also ==
- Education in Ontario
- List of secondary schools in Ontario
