= 2025 NBA Finals =

North America basketball championship

Team	Coach	Wins
Oklahoma City Thunder	Mark Daigneault	4
Indiana Pacers	Rick Carlisle	3
- Dates: June 5–22
- MVP: Shai Gilgeous-Alexander (Oklahoma City Thunder)
- Eastern finals: Pacers defeated Knicks, 4–2
- Western finals: Thunder defeated Timberwolves, 4–1

The 2025 NBA Finals was the championship series of the National Basketball Association's (NBA) 2024–25 season and conclusion to the season's playoffs. The best-of-seven series ended with the Western Conference champion Oklahoma City Thunder defeating the Eastern Conference champion Indiana Pacers in seven games. The Thunder's Shai Gilgeous-Alexander was voted the NBA Finals Most Valuable Player (MVP), becoming the first Canadian to win the award. The series began on June 5 and ended on June 22 with the first NBA Finals Game 7 since 2016.

With a league-best regular season record of 68–14, the Thunder held home-court advantage in the Finals. They came into the series as heavy favorites against the 50–32 Pacers. The Pacers set an NBA postseason record with five 15-point comebacks. One was in Game 1 of the Finals, when Tyrese Haliburton made a game-winning two-point jump shot with 0.3 seconds left. The teams split the first six games, forcing a decisive Game 7, in which Haliburton tore his right Achilles tendon in the first quarter. The Thunder's victory secured their second championship in franchise history, after their 1979 title as the Seattle SuperSonics, and their first since their 2008 move to Oklahoma City.

The 2025 Finals crowned the NBA's seventh unique champion in seven years, the longest stretch in league history. The 2025 Finals was also the first since 2006 in which both cities were seeking their first NBA championship. (Note: The Seattle SuperSonics won the NBA championship in 1979 and later relocated to Oklahoma City in 2008; however, Oklahoma City never had a team win an NBA championship in its city prior to 2025.)

The Thunder's victory was the first championship in any major professional sport for the state of Oklahoma.

== Background ==
This was the first playoff match-up between Oklahoma City and Indiana. Oklahoma City won both of its regular season games against Indiana. The Thunder had not lost a game at home to an Eastern Conference team since losing to the Pacers on March 12, 2024. Both teams were in the Finals after missing the playoffs two seasons prior. This was the smallest NBA Finals in terms of total market size, with the previous lowest mark belonging to Cleveland and San Antonio in 2007. The total television market size comprises fewer than two million households with Indianapolis being the 22nd largest and Oklahoma City being the 26th largest out of 28 markets league-wide. The 2025 Finals also set another milestone; it was the first Finals without a luxury tax team since the salary cap era began in 2002.

Coincidentally, both teams traded former star player Paul George in trades that yielded their best players, Shai Gilgeous-Alexander and Tyrese Haliburton to the Thunder and the Pacers, respectively. On the eve of free agency in 2017, the Pacers traded George to the Thunder for Victor Oladipo and Domantas Sabonis. Sabonis, along with other players, was dealt to the Sacramento Kings for Haliburton and other pieces before the 2022 trade deadline. For Oklahoma City, George starred for the team, finishing third in NBA Most Valuable Player (MVP) and Defensive Player of the Year voting in 2018–19, but the team fell in the first round in both his seasons with the club. On July 10, 2019, the Thunder traded George to the Los Angeles Clippers for Gilgeous-Alexander, Danilo Gallinari, five first-round draft picks, and the rights to swap two other first-round picks (with one of them used to select Jalen Williams).

The Thunder entered the NBA Finals as the second-largest betting favorite in the previous 20 years, with only the 2018 Golden State Warriors having shorter pre-Finals odds since 2005. The 18-game difference in wins between the teams was the largest among NBA Finals participants since the 1981 Finals between the 62-win Celtics and 40-win Rockets.

=== Indiana Pacers ===
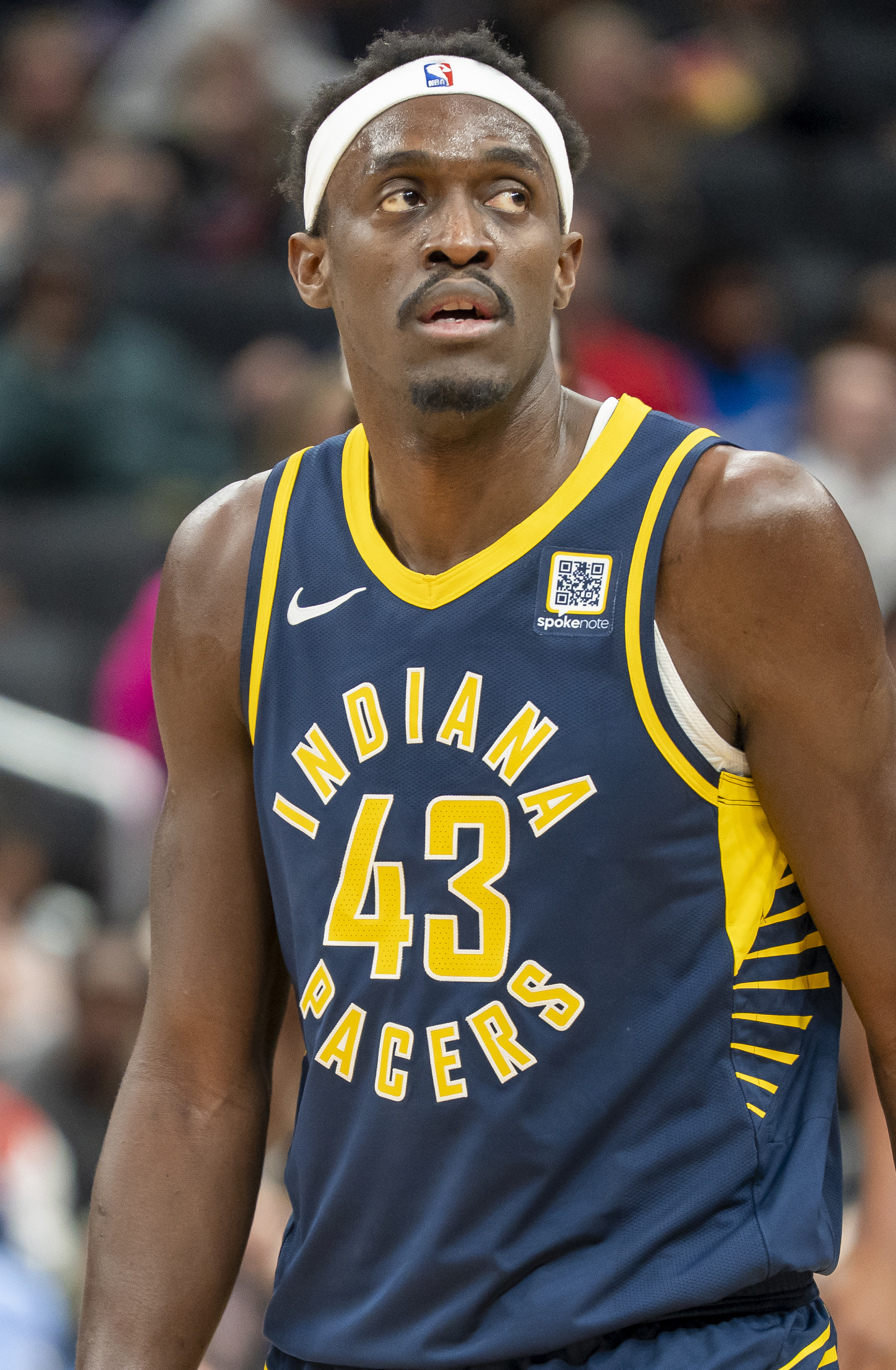
Pascal Siakam made his second NBA Finals appearance after winning a championship as a member of the 2019 Toronto Raptors.

From October through December, Indiana was a .500 team or worse, hitting a low point after a loss to Charlotte on December 8 to put their record at 10–15. Star point guard Tyrese Haliburton struggled during this time, saying he was having personal off-court problems. They did not get going until January, when they posted a 10–2 record. The Pacers went 20–9 from the All-Star break until the end of the season. During the turnaround, Haliburton found his rhythm and his stats improved greatly; the team got healthier (starters Haliburton, Andrew Nembhard, and Aaron Nesmith all had injuries at the beginning of the year); and their defense improved dramatically, ranking ninth in defensive efficiency after early December. Steady veteran forward Pascal Siakam earned his third career All-Star Game appearance, while Haliburton earned his second straight All-NBA third-team honor. The Pacers' offensive rating ranked second in the league, and they led the league in assist percentage and true shooting percentage as a team. Another strength was their depth, as no Pacers player averaged more than 33.6 minutes per game during the regular season.

The team finished with a record of 50–32, marking Indiana's first 50-win season since 2014 and earning the fourth seed in the Eastern Conference playoffs. In the First Round, the Pacers met the Milwaukee Bucks, a rematch from the previous year's first round. They won the series in five games, highlighted by a 7-point, 40-second comeback in overtime in Game 5. They then upset the 64-win, top-seeded Cleveland Cavaliers in the Eastern Conference Semifinals in five games, which was again highlighted by an unlikely comeback when they won Game 2 on a Haliburton game-winning three after being down 7 points with 46 seconds left. The Pacers' third improbable comeback was against the New York Knicks in Game 1 of the Eastern Conference Finals: down 14 with 2:45 left, the Pacers won in overtime. Indiana was the first team in the play-by-play era (1996–97–present) to win a game where they were trailing by 14 points or more with 2:45 left in the game. In their second straight conference finals, they beat the Knicks in six games. After their 10–15 start, Indiana went 52–21 for the rest of the season.

This was the Pacers' second NBA Finals appearance. Their previous appearance was in 2000, a loss to the Los Angeles Lakers. The Pacers won three ABA championships, but the NBA does not incorporate ABA statistics into its official records. Pacers coach Rick Carlisle, a lead assistant to head coach Larry Bird on the 2000 team, sought his second championship as head coach and third overall. Carlisle won a ring as a player on the 1986 Celtics and as a head coach on the 2011 Mavericks. Siakam returned to the NBA Finals for the second time after winning a championship in 2019 with the Toronto Raptors. The only other players on the roster with Finals experience were Nesmith and December trade acquisition Thomas Bryant; Nesmith played a small role on the 2022 Celtics and Bryant won a championship with the 2023 Nuggets.

=== Oklahoma City Thunder ===
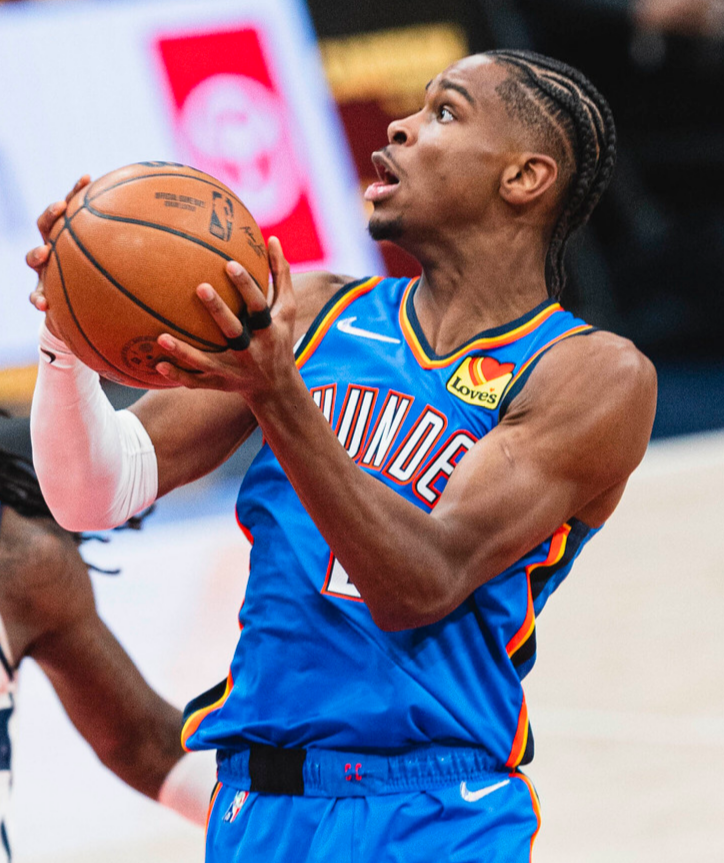
Shai Gilgeous-Alexander became the first player to win the regular season MVP and an NBA Finals in the same season since Steph Curry in 2014–15.

In the 2024–25 season, Oklahoma City had its best season in franchise history, finishing 68–14 to secure the top seed in the Western Conference for a second straight year. They did so in dominant fashion, outscoring opponents by 12.9 points per game during the regular season, more than half a point better than the previous record, set by the 1971–72 Los Angeles Lakers when Los Angeles outscored opponents by 12.3 points per game. They were led by the regular season MVP Shai Gilgeous-Alexander, who led the league with 32.7 points per game while also averaging 6.4 assists and five rebounds. Third-year player Jalen Williams continued his ascent as one of the league's best forwards, improving in every major statistical category from last season, becoming an All-Star for the first time, and making the third team All-NBA. After losing to the Dallas Mavericks in the 2024 Western Conference semifinals, the team acquired veteran depth pieces Isaiah Hartenstein (via free agency) and Alex Caruso (via trade). Gilgeous-Alexander, Williams, Hartenstein, Caruso, second-year center Chet Holmgren, and guard Luguentz Dort formed a stalwart defensive unit as OKC led the league in most defensive categories; Dort was also rewarded with an All-Defensive first team honor, while Williams was voted to the All-Defensive second team. Rounding out the roster were sharpshooters Aaron Wiggins and Isaiah Joe; second-year player guard Cason Wallace, another great defensive player; and reserve big man Jaylin Williams, who filled in for Holmgren during his two-month absence with a hip injury. For putting this roster together, Thunder executive vice president and general manager Sam Presti was named the 2024–25 NBA Executive of the Year. Head coach Mark Daigneault, who was named Coach of the Year the previous season, came in fourth for the award this season. OKC finished 16 games better than the Houston Rockets, the second-best team in the Western Conference. This margin between a first and second seed was the largest in NBA history.

In the playoffs, the Thunder dispatched the Memphis Grizzlies in a four-game sweep in the First Round. In the Western Conference Semifinals, they defeated the veteran Denver Nuggets in seven games, with a blowout home win in the seventh game. They won the Western Conference finals handily against the Minnesota Timberwolves in five games. The Thunder entered the Finals 8–1 at home, with their only defeat coming on an Aaron Gordon game-winning three in the final seconds of Game 1 of the second round against Denver.

This was the franchise's fifth NBA Finals appearance overall and second since the team's relocation to Oklahoma City. Their last appearance was in 2012, when they lost to the Miami Heat. The franchise also made three Finals appearances as the Seattle SuperSonics, winning one title in 1979. Caruso was the only player or coach on the roster with Finals experience, as he won a championship with the Los Angeles Lakers. The Thunder became the youngest team to make the NBA Finals since the 1977 Portland Trail Blazers.

=== Road to the Finals ===
Eastern Conference
#	Team	W	L	PCT	GB	GP
1	c – Cleveland Cavaliers *	64	18	.780	–	82
2	y – Boston Celtics *	61	21	.744	3.0	82
3	x – New York Knicks	51	31	.622	13.0	82
4	x – Indiana Pacers	50	32	.610	14.0	82
5	x – Milwaukee Bucks	48	34	.585	16.0	82
6	x – Detroit Pistons	44	38	.537	20.0	82
7	y – Orlando Magic *	41	41	.500	23.0	82
8	pi – Atlanta Hawks	40	42	.488	24.0	82
9	pi – Chicago Bulls	39	43	.476	25.0	82
10	x – Miami Heat	37	45	.451	27.0	82
11	Toronto Raptors	30	52	.366	34.0	82
12	Brooklyn Nets	26	56	.317	38.0	82
13	Philadelphia 76ers	24	58	.293	40.0	82
14	Charlotte Hornets	19	63	.232	45.0	82
15	Washington Wizards	18	64	.220	46.0	82

Western Conference
#	Team	W	L	PCT	GB	GP
1	z – Oklahoma City Thunder *	68	14	.829	–	82
2	y – Houston Rockets *	52	30	.634	16.0	82
3	y – Los Angeles Lakers *	50	32	.610	18.0	82
4	x – Denver Nuggets	50	32	.610	18.0	82
5	x – Los Angeles Clippers	50	32	.610	18.0	82
6	x – Minnesota Timberwolves	49	33	.598	19.0	82
7	x – Golden State Warriors	48	34	.585	20.0	82
8	x – Memphis Grizzlies	48	34	.585	20.0	82
9	pi – Sacramento Kings	40	42	.488	28.0	82
10	pi – Dallas Mavericks	39	43	.476	29.0	82
11	Phoenix Suns	36	46	.439	32.0	82
12	Portland Trail Blazers	36	46	.439	32.0	82
13	San Antonio Spurs	34	48	.415	34.0	82
14	New Orleans Pelicans	21	61	.256	47.0	82
15	Utah Jazz	17	65	.207	51.0	82

Notes

- z – Clinched home-court advantage for the entire playoffs
- c – Clinched home-court advantage for the conference playoffs
- y – Clinched division title
- x – Clinched playoff spot
- pi – Clinched play-in tournament spot
- * – Division leader

Playoff results
Indiana Pacers (Eastern Conference champion)		Oklahoma City Thunder (Western Conference champion)
Defeated the 5th-seeded Milwaukee Bucks, 4–1	First round	Defeated the 8th-seeded Memphis Grizzlies, 4–0
Defeated the 1st-seeded Cleveland Cavaliers, 4–1	Conference semifinals	Defeated the 4th-seeded Denver Nuggets, 4–3
Defeated the 3rd-seeded New York Knicks, 4–2	Conference finals	Defeated the 6th-seeded Minnesota Timberwolves, 4–1

=== Regular season series ===
The Thunder won the regular season series 2–0.

December 26, 2024

Recap

Oklahoma City Thunder 120, Indiana Pacers 114

Gainbridge Fieldhouse, Indianapolis, IN

March 29, 2025

Recap

Indiana Pacers 111, Oklahoma City Thunder 132

Paycom Center, Oklahoma City, OK

== Series summary ==
Game	Date	Road team	Result	Home team
Game 1	June 5	Indiana Pacers	111–110 (1–0)	Oklahoma City Thunder
Game 2	June 8	Indiana Pacers	107–123 (1–1)	Oklahoma City Thunder
Game 3	June 11	Oklahoma City Thunder	107–116 (2–1)	Indiana Pacers
Game 4	June 13	Oklahoma City Thunder	111–104 (2–2)	Indiana Pacers
Game 5	June 16	Indiana Pacers	109–120 (2–3)	Oklahoma City Thunder
Game 6	June 19	Oklahoma City Thunder	91–108 (3–3)	Indiana Pacers
Game 7	June 22	Indiana Pacers	91–103 (3–4)	Oklahoma City Thunder

== Game summaries ==
Note: Times are EDT (UTC−4) as listed by the NBA. For games in Oklahoma City, the local time is also given (CDT, UTC−5).

=== Game 1 ===
ABC

June 5
8:30 p.m. (7:30 pm CDT)

Recap

Indiana Pacers 111, Oklahoma City Thunder 110
Scoring by quarter: 20–29, 25–28, 31–28, 35–25
Pts: Pascal Siakam 19; Rebs: Aaron Nesmith 12; Asts: Haliburton, Nembhard 6 each	Pts: Shai Gilgeous-Alexander 38; Rebs: Isaiah Hartenstein 9 Asts: Jalen Williams 6
Indiana leads series, 1–0

Paycom Center, Oklahoma City, Oklahoma
Attendance: 18,203
Referees:
- No. 10 John Goble
- No. 8 Marc Davis
- No. 16 David Guthrie

External videos
- Game 1 full replay on the NBA's official YouTube channel

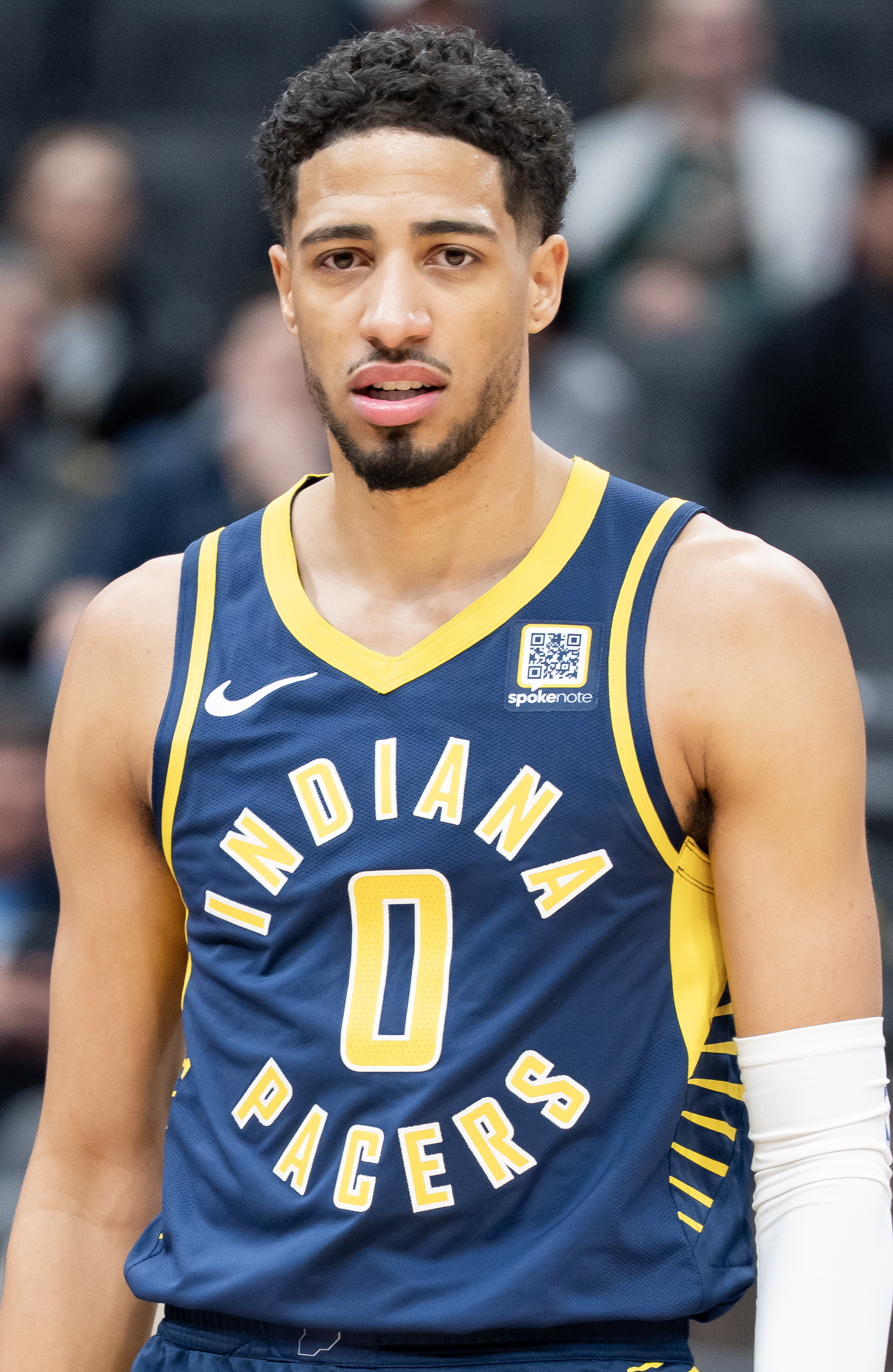
Tyrese Haliburton's jumpshot with 0.3 seconds left won the game for Indiana.

The Thunder jumped out to an early lead and forced a record 19 Indiana turnovers in the first half, taking a 57–45 advantage into halftime. In the fourth quarter, the Pacers trimmed an initial 15-point deficit with 9:42 left into a one-possession game with under two minutes left. After a coach's challenge by Rick Carlisle on a Pascal Siakam out-of-bounds call was ruled unsuccessful with 22 seconds remaining, the Thunder were up 110–109, but Shai Gilgeous-Alexander's midrange jumper missed, and Indiana gained possession. Carlisle opted not to call a timeout to give the Thunder a chance to set their defense, allowing the Pacers to push in transition. Tyrese Haliburton, who had already made clutch shots this postseason against Milwaukee, Cleveland, and New York, nailed a 21-foot pull-up jump shot over Cason Wallace to put Indiana up 111–110 with 0.3 seconds left, marking their first lead of the entire game. The Thunder's final lob attempt failed, giving the Pacers another improbable come-from-behind playoff victory.

Gilgeous-Alexander led all scorers with 38 points, marking the third-most points in a Finals debut behind Allen Iverson and George Mikan. Jalen Williams and Luguentz Dort combined for 32 points for the Thunder, while Chet Holmgren struggled with just six points on 2-of–9 shooting from the field. Siakam led the scoring for the Pacers with 19 points and 10 rebounds. All five Indiana starters finished in double figures, with Aaron Nesmith and Haliburton tallying double-doubles, and Obi Toppin adding 17 points in a productive night off the bench. This was just the Thunder's second home loss of the entire playoffs, the last coming in a 121–119 loss in Game 1 of the conference semifinals against the Denver Nuggets. According to ESPN analytics, the Thunder held a 96.4% win probability with a nine-point lead and 2:52 remaining. This game marked the Pacers' fourth comeback this postseason in which their opponent had at least a 95% chance of winning with under three minutes left; each game included a game-tying or go-ahead basket by Haliburton.

Haliburton's go-ahead shot with 0.3 seconds left marked the latest game winner in an NBA Finals game since Michael Jordan's buzzer-beating shot in Game 1 of the 1997 Finals. The Pacers in Game 1 joined the 1999 Spurs in Game 2 of the Western Conference Finals and the 2002 Lakers in Game 4 of the Western Conference Finals as teams to win a playoff game despite leading for only 20 seconds or less. Indiana also tied the 1992 Chicago Bulls in Game 6 and the 2011 Dallas Mavericks in Game 2—the latter also coached by Carlisle—for the largest NBA Finals fourth-quarter comeback. This was Oklahoma City's first home loss to an Eastern Conference team since March 12, 2024, also to the Pacers. After the game, Thunder star Shai Gilgeous-Alexander said, "It's a 48-minute game, and [the Pacers] teach you that lesson more than anyone else in the league the hard way."

=== Game 2 ===
ABC

June 8
8:00 pm (7:00 pm CDT)

Recap

Indiana Pacers 107, Oklahoma City Thunder 123
Scoring by quarter: 20–26, 21–33, 33–34, 33–30
Pts: Tyrese Haliburton 17; Rebs: Pascal Siakam 7 Asts: Haliburton, McConnell 6 each	Pts: Shai Gilgeous-Alexander 34; Rebs: Isaiah Hartenstein 8 Asts: Shai Gilgeous-Alexander 8
Series tied, 1–1

Paycom Center, Oklahoma City, Oklahoma
Attendance: 18,203
Referees:
- No. 15 Zach Zarba
- No. 60 James Williams
- No. 46 Ben Taylor

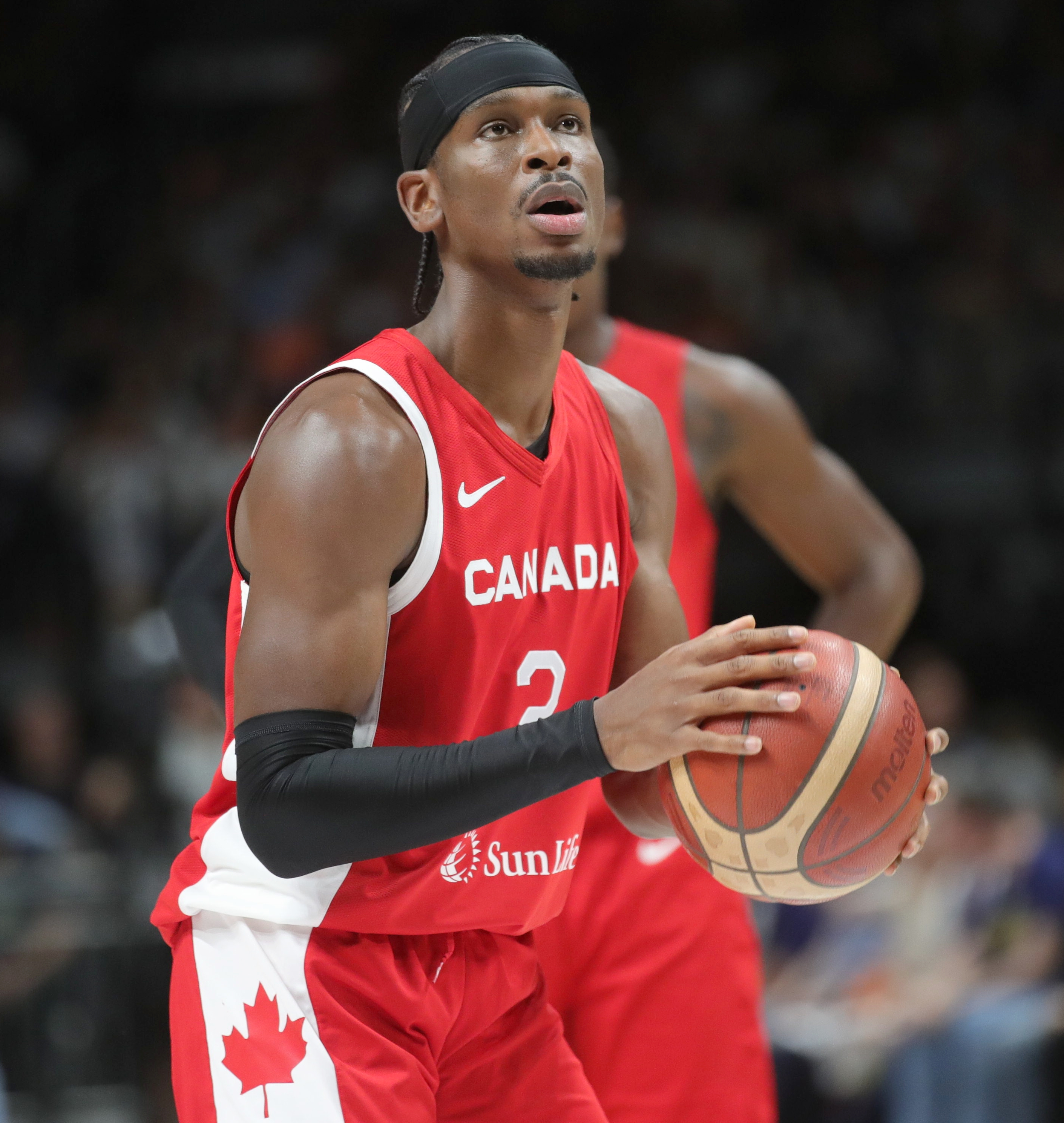
In a Game 2 win, Shai Gilgeous-Alexander became the 12th player to score a combined 3,000 points in the regular season and playoff.

The Thunder defeated the Pacers 123–107 to tie the series, winning their first Finals game since their Game 1 win in 2012 against the Miami Heat. The Thunder took a six-point lead in the opening quarter. In the second quarter, the Thunder capitalized on a 19–2 run, jumping out to a 23-point lead before finishing with an 18-point lead at halftime. For the rest of the game, Indiana was unable to cut the lead back down to single digits. Tyrese Haliburton attempted to spark the Pacers in the beginning of the fourth quarter, but a Thunder response left Indiana unable to bring the deficit under 19 points for the first six minutes before they ceded defeat.

Shai Gilgeous-Alexander followed up his 38-point Finals debut by leading all Thunder scorers with 34 points (in addition to eight assists and five rebounds), totaling 72 points across two games. He surpassed Allen Iverson (71 points, 2001) for the most combined points scored in a player's first two Finals games. Gilgeous-Alexander became the 12th player to score a combined 3,000 points in the regular season and playoffs. This also marked his ninth consecutive home playoff game with at least 30 points, tying an NBA record previously set by Wilt Chamberlain. Jalen Williams and Chet Holmgren came back from poor offensive performances in Game 1 with 19 and 15 points, respectively. The Thunder became the first team to have five or more 15+ point scorers in a Finals game since the 2019 Toronto Raptors. Haliburton led the Pacers with 17 points, while Myles Turner and Pascal Siakam added 16 and 15, respectively. For the second straight game, none of the Pacers reached 20 points; they became the first team since the 2013 Miami Heat to have no players score 20 points in two straight Finals games.

=== Game 3 ===
ABC

June 11
8:30 pm

Recap

Oklahoma City Thunder 107, Indiana Pacers 116
Scoring by quarter: 32–24, 28–40, 29–20, 18–32
Pts: Jalen Williams 26; Rebs: Chet Holmgren 10; Asts: Caruso, Gilgeous-Alexander 4 each	Pts: Bennedict Mathurin 27; Rebs: Tyrese Haliburton 9 Asts: Tyrese Haliburton 11
Indiana leads series, 2–1

Gainbridge Fieldhouse, Indianapolis, Indiana
Attendance: 17,274
Referees:
- No. 19 James Capers
- No. 25 Tony Brothers
- No. 39 Tyler Ford

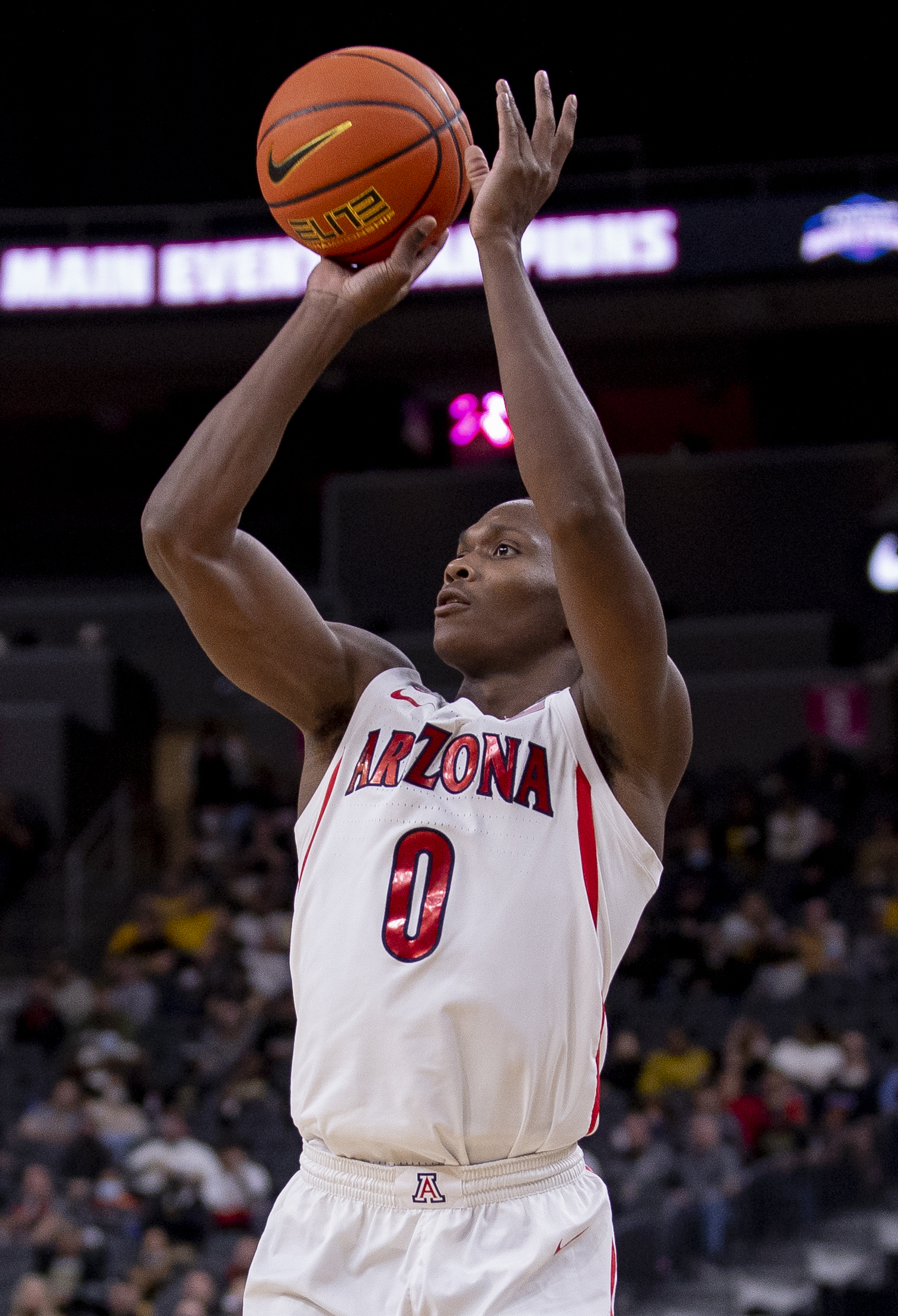
Bennedict Mathurin scored a playoff career-high 27 points off the bench to give the Pacers a 2–1 series lead.

In a tightly contested game in which neither team led by double digits, the Pacers surged in the fourth quarter to reclaim the series lead. The Thunder took an early nine-point lead behind hot starts by Holmgren and Dort, who combined for 22 of the team's 32 points in the first quarter. But Indiana's bench shifted the momentum in the second quarter. Bennedict Mathurin scored 14 points in the frame, while T. J. McConnell energized the team with four assists and three steals. The game remained close, and a 6–0 Thunder run in the final minute of the third quarter gave Oklahoma City a five-point edge entering the fourth. From there, the Pacers took control. Indiana shot 13-of-21 from the field in the final period, while limiting the Thunder to just 35% shooting and forcing five turnovers. With the score tied at 98 and under seven minutes to play, Tyrese Haliburton scored or assisted on 10 of the Pacers' 14 points during a decisive 14–6 run that gave them an eight-point lead with 1:09 remaining—a lead they did not relinquish.

Mathurin finished with a game-high 27 points on 9-of-12 shooting in 22 minutes off the bench, marking the most points by a reserve in the NBA Finals since Jason Terry scored 27 in 2011. Mathurin was supported by McConnell (five steals, five assists) and Obi Toppin (six rebounds, two blocks), helping Indiana dominate Oklahoma City 49–18 in bench points. Haliburton nearly recorded a triple-double with 22 points, 11 assists, and 9 rebounds, while Pascal Siakam added 21 points, giving the Pacers three 20-point scorers in the game after having none in the first two games. Jalen Williams led the Thunder with 26 points on 50% shooting. Shai Gilgeous-Alexander contributed 24 points but struggled with turnovers, posting four assists against six turnovers, marking his first postseason game with a negative assist-to-turnover ratio. Holmgren added 20 points, going 6-of-9 inside the arc but missing all six of his three-point attempts.

The Pacers won their tenth straight game following a loss, dating back to March 15. The Thunder, who went 61–2 when leading going into the fourth quarter in the regular season, fell to 1–2 in such situations in the Finals.

=== Game 4 ===
ABC

June 13
8:30 pm

Recap

Oklahoma City Thunder 111, Indiana Pacers 104
Scoring by quarter: 34–35, 23–25, 23–27, 31–17
Pts: Shai Gilgeous-Alexander 35; Rebs: Chet Holmgren 15; Asts: Williams, Hartenstein 3 each	Pts: Pascal Siakam 20; Rebs: Aaron Nesmith 9 Asts: Tyrese Haliburton 7
Series tied, 2–2

Gainbridge Fieldhouse, Indianapolis, Indiana
Attendance: 17,274
Referees:
- No. 48 Scott Foster
- No. 58 Josh Tiven
- No. 4 Sean Wright

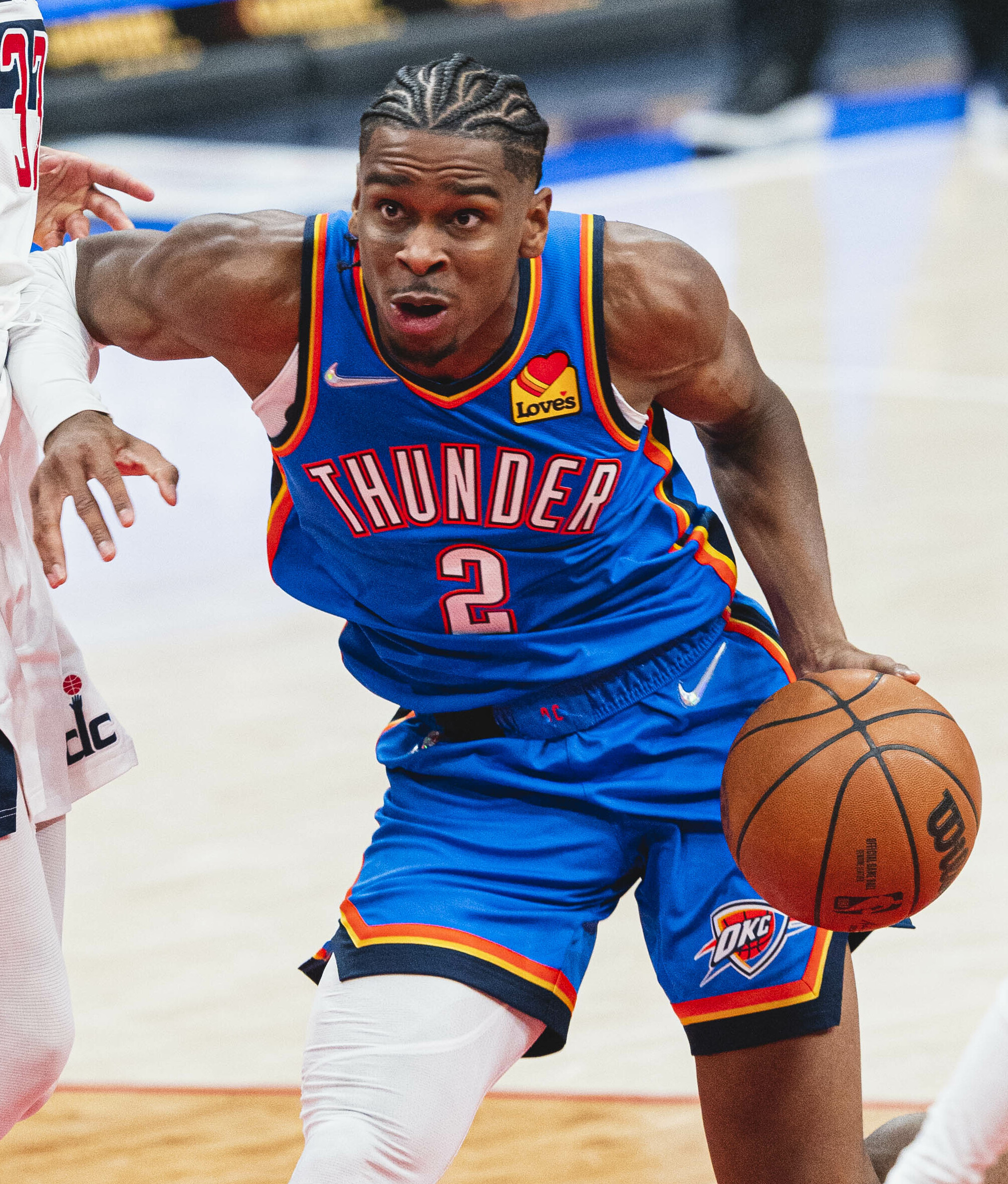
Shai Gilgeous-Alexander scored 15 of his 35 points with 8 free throws in the final 4:38 to help even up the series at 2 apiece.

Much like their second round series against the Denver Nuggets, the Thunder won a crucial Game 4 to avoid a 3–1 deficit. The Thunder rallied in the 4th quarter after being down by 10 points. The Thunder moved to 18–2 after a defeat in both the regular season and playoffs, tying the 1986–87 Lakers for the best winning percentage in NBA history after a loss in a season.

Shai Gilgeous-Alexander delivered, scoring 15 of his 35 points in the final 4:38, capping Oklahoma City's rally from a 10-point, second-half deficit. Jalen Williams added 27, Alex Caruso had 20 and Chet Holmgren finished with 14 points and 15 rebounds. Down the stretch in the fourth quarter, Holmgren's defense proved vital against Tyrese Haliburton. The Thunder won the game despite a season-low three 3-pointers and no assists from Gilgeous-Alexander for the first time all season.

The Pacers, who had a 10-point lead deep into the third quarter, were unable to pull away. Pascal Siakam scored 20 for Indiana, but only took one shot in the fourth quarter. Haliburton had 18 points and 7 assists, while Obi Toppin continued his stellar play off the bench with 17 points. The Pacers had chances at the end of the game, but Bennedict Mathurin missed 3-of-4 free throws and committed two away from the play fouls in the last 23.1 seconds. Haliburton made Finals history for the most points scored in a 3-game span (53) without a free throw attempt, surpassing Kobe Bryant's mark set in the 2000 NBA Finals.

=== Game 5 ===
ABC

June 16
8:30 pm (7:30 pm CDT)

Recap

Indiana Pacers 109, Oklahoma City Thunder 120
Scoring by quarter: 22–32, 23–27, 34–28, 30–33
Pts: Pascal Siakam 28; Rebs: Bennedict Mathurin 8 Asts: Tyrese Haliburton 6	Pts: Jalen Williams 40; Rebs: Chet Holmgren 11; Asts: Shai Gilgeous-Alexander 10
Oklahoma City leads series, 3–2

Paycom Center, Oklahoma City, Oklahoma
Attendance: 18,203
Referees:
- No. 10 John Goble
- No. 8 Marc Davis
- No. 60 James Williams

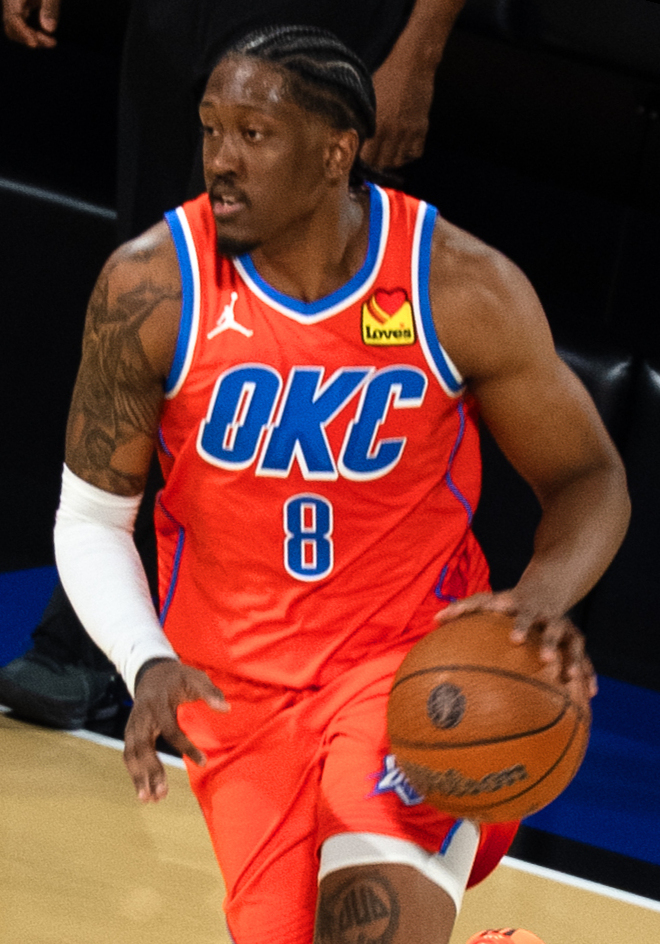
Jalen Williams scored a career playoff-high 40 points to help the Thunder prevent a second comeback attempt by the Pacers and secure a 3–2 series lead.

Oklahoma City halted an Indiana fourth-quarter comeback attempt to take a 3–2 lead. Jalen Williams scored a career playoff-high 40 points and Shai Gilgeous-Alexander added 31 in the Thunder's 120–109 win. It was the 10th time the Thunder star duo combined for more than 70 points in a game. Williams was 14-of-24 from the field, while Gilgeous-Alexander added 10 assists after having none in game 4. The pair combined to score or assist on 103 points, the most by a duo in an NBA Finals game in the past 50 years, according to ESPN Research. Through five games, Gilgeous-Alexander and Williams had 291 combined points, the fourth-most by a duo through the first five games of an NBA Finals since the NBA-ABA merger in 1977. Off the bench, Aaron Wiggins added 14 points and Cason Wallace, who was benched for Isaiah Hartenstein in Game 4, had 4 steals and scored 11 points; Alex Caruso also had 4 steals for an Oklahoma City defense that forced 22 Pacers' turnovers. After a rough game shooting the ball from three in Game 4, Williams (3-of-5), Luguentz Dort (3-of-6), Wiggins (4-of-7), and Wallace (3-of-4) led the 3-point shooting for OKC, who shot 43.8% from beyond the arc as a team.

Similar to their previous two games in Oklahoma City, the Pacers got off to a rough start. Tyrese Haliburton strained his right calf in the first quarter and was not the same the rest of the game, not making a field goal and only scoring four points. Down by as many as 18 late in the second quarter, the Pacers got within five late in the third quarter. With Haliburton hampered, back-up point guard T. J. McConnell led the rally, scoring 13 points in just under seven minutes. The Pacers took that momentum into the fourth quarter, as Pascal Siakam made a pair of free throws with 9:19 left to get Indiana within four and then made a 3-pointer a minute later to cut the score to 95–93. But that was the closest Indiana got, as OKC ratcheted up the pressure, outscoring Indiana 21–8 over the next five minutes. Siakam finished with 28 points on 9-of-15 shooting, and McConnell scored 18 points overall. This was the first time this postseason that the Pacers trailed in a playoff series.

=== Game 6 ===
ABC

June 19
8:30 pm

Recap

Oklahoma City Thunder 91, Indiana Pacers 108
Scoring by quarter: 25–28, 17–36, 18–26, 31–18
Pts: Shai Gilgeous-Alexander 21; Rebs: Chet Holmgren 6 Asts: Ajay Mitchell 4	Pts: Obi Toppin 20; Rebs: Pascal Siakam 13; Asts: T. J. McConnell 6
Series tied, 3–3

Gainbridge Fieldhouse, Indianapolis, Indiana
Attendance: 17,274
Referees:
- No. 15 Zach Zarba
- No. 25 Tony Brothers
- No. 16 David Guthrie

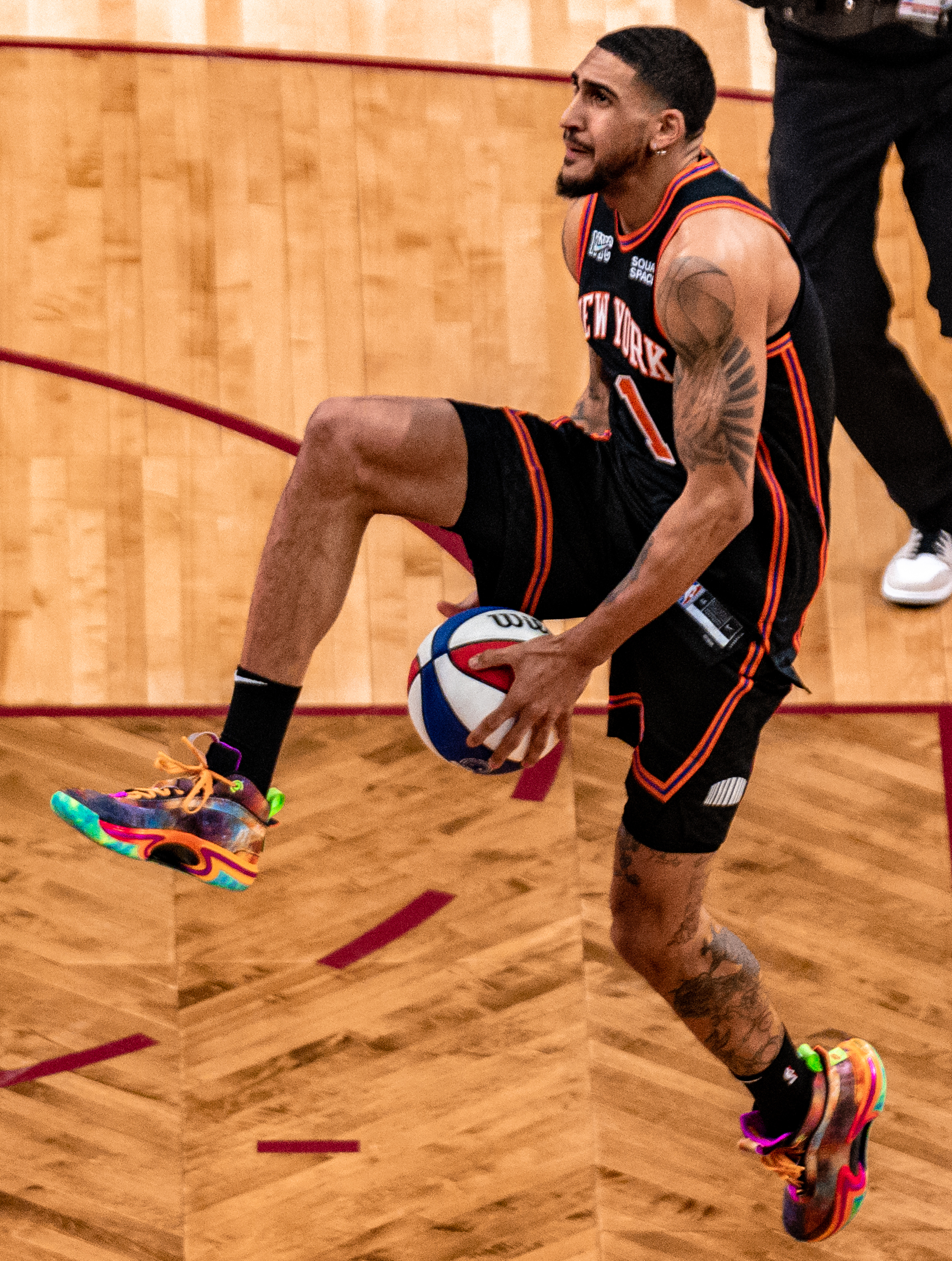
Six Pacers scored in double figures, including Obi Toppin, who led the team with 20 points.

A balanced Pacers effort on both sides of the ball helped extend the series and force a Game 7 in the NBA Finals for the first time since 2016. The Thunder picked up where they left off in Game 5 with an early 10–2 run to start the game. The Pacers responded with a 24–7 run, highlighted by Andrew Nembhard and Obi Toppin scoring 16 of the 24 points and Indiana's defense forcing four turnovers. The first quarter ended with the Pacers leading 28–25, the lowest scoring output in the first quarter of the series for the Thunder. With 5:22 left in the second quarter, Indiana held their largest lead of the Finals when the score was 45–33 after an Aaron Nesmith 3-pointer. The Pacers stretched that to 51–35, completing a 17–2 run over a span of 5:13 from a score of 34–33. The quarter ended with a Pascal Siakam mid-range buzzer beater over Alex Caruso; 40 seconds earlier, Siakam also had a poster dunk on Jalen Williams, off a no-look feed from Tyrese Haliburton. At halftime, Indiana held a commanding 64–42 lead. For Oklahoma City, Williams and Shai Gilgeous-Alexander had 31 of the Thunder's 42 points.

Oklahoma City had a chance to get back into the game at the start of the third quarter, as the Pacers missed their first seven shots of the quarter. But the Thunder also started the quarter cold, also missing their first seven shots, and no points were scored in the first 3:53 of play. Indiana ended the third the same way they ended the second, with a buzzer-beater, this time by Ben Sheppard, which made the score 90–60. With a big lead, the Pacers rested Haliburton's calf injury for most of the second half. Toppin led the Pacers in scoring with 20 points off the bench. Five other Pacers scored in double figures. As a team, they forced 21 turnovers, including 8 by Gilgeous-Alexander, a career high for the league's MVP. Oklahoma City shot only 26.7% from beyond the arc, and at −40, Jalen Williams had the worst +/- in NBA Finals history for a single game.

=== Game 7 ===
ABC

June 22
8:00 pm (7:00 pm CDT)

Recap

Indiana Pacers 91, Oklahoma City Thunder 103
Scoring by quarter: 22–25, 26–22, 20–34, 23–22
Pts: Bennedict Mathurin 24; Rebs: Bennedict Mathurin 13; Asts: Andrew Nembhard 6	Pts: Shai Gilgeous-Alexander 29; Rebs: Isaiah Hartenstein 9 Asts: Shai Gilgeous-Alexander 12
Oklahoma City wins NBA Finals, 4–3

Paycom Center, Oklahoma City, Oklahoma
Attendance: 18,203
Referees:
- No. 19 James Capers
- No. 58 Josh Tiven
- No. 4 Sean Wright

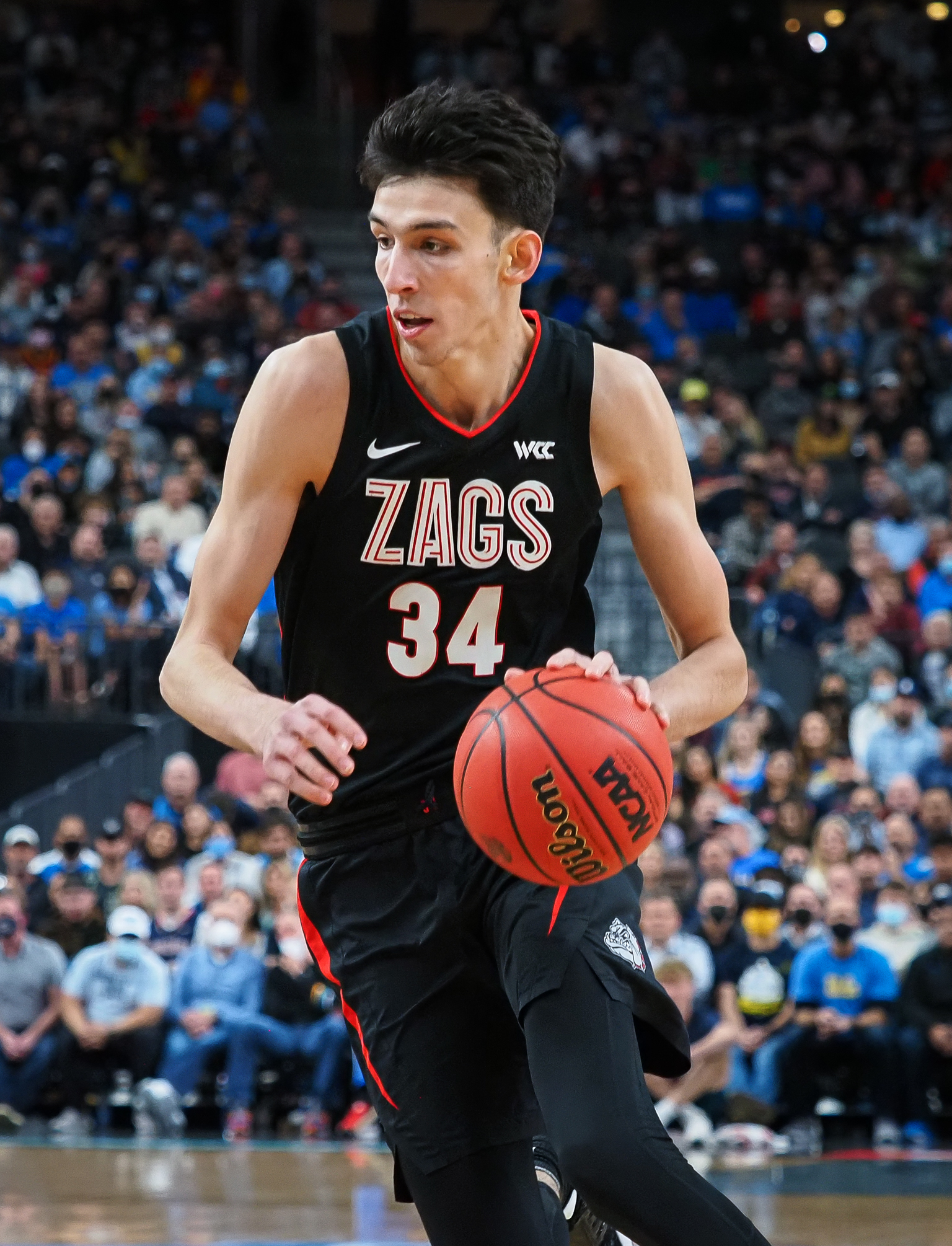
Chet Holmgren set a record for most blocks (5) in a Game 7 of the NBA Finals.

This was the 20th Game 7 in NBA Finals history and the first Game 7 of an NBA Finals in Pacers history, while the Thunder, then known as the Seattle SuperSonics, lost a Game 7 in the 1978 NBA Finals at home to the Washington Bullets.

With five minutes left in the first quarter, Tyrese Haliburton, already playing with a right calf strain, tore his right Achilles tendon on a non-contact drive to the basket. The entire Pacers team left the bench to huddle around Haliburton, who got up and was helped off the court; he was ruled out of the game a few minutes later. Before the injury, Haliburton had made 3-of-4 three-pointers. Despite Indiana losing who many felt was their best player, the Pacers had a 48–47 lead at halftime.

In the third quarter, Oklahoma City broke through; three consecutive three pointers midway into the third quarter gave them a 65–56 lead. Chet Holmgren and Jalen Williams, who both struggled in the first half, combined for 16 points in the quarter. A lone bright spot for Indiana in the third was T. J. McConnell, who scored the last 12 points for the Pacers, but they were down by 13 at the end of the quarter, 81–68. Indiana's poor play continued over into the fourth quarter, as they did not score a basket until Pascal Siakam made a mid-range jump shot with 7:29 left. The Pacers cut Oklahoma City's lead to 10, but that was the smallest margin for the rest of the game. The Thunder's three key players (Gilgeous-Alexander, Williams, and Holmgren) led the team to a 103–91 victory, winning the second title in franchise history. Gilgeous-Alexander scored 29 points and 12 assists, Holmgren recorded 18 points, eight rebounds, and five blocks, and Williams scored 20 points. With 103 points scored, the Thunder became the first team to score 100 points or more in a Finals Game 7 since the Los Angeles Lakers and Detroit Pistons did so in 1988.

Gilgeous-Alexander was voted the Finals MVP; he was the first player to win a regular season MVP and Finals MVP in the same season since LeBron James in 2013. He also became the fourth player to win the league scoring title along with regular season and Finals MVPs in one season, and the first since Shaquille O'Neal in 2000. (Note: The other players were Michael Jordan (four times) and Kareem Abdul-Jabbar (1971).)

This was the first championship for the state of Oklahoma in a major professional sport. The Thunder were the second-youngest team to win an NBA championship, behind the 1977 Portland Trail Blazers. By the end of the series, they also became the first team since the 2015–16 Golden State Warriors to have a combined total of 84 or more wins in the regular season and playoffs.

== Rosters ==
=== Indiana Pacers ===
2024–25 Indiana Pacers roster
Players

Pos.	No.	Player	Height	Weight	DOB	From
C	13	Tony Bradley	6 ft 10 in (2.08 m)	245 lb (111 kg)	1998-01-08	North Carolina
C	3	Thomas Bryant	6 ft 10 in (2.08 m)	248 lb (112 kg)	1997-07-31	Indiana
G	10	RayJ Dennis (TW)	6 ft 2 in (1.88 m)	180 lb (82 kg)	2001-03-30	Baylor
F	8	Enrique Freeman (TW)	6 ft 7 in (2.01 m)	206 lb (93 kg)	2000-07-29	Akron
G/F	12	Johnny Furphy	6 ft 9 in (2.06 m)	200 lb (91 kg)	2004-12-08	Kansas
G	0	Tyrese Haliburton	6 ft 5 in (1.96 m)	185 lb (84 kg)	2000-02-29	Iowa State
F	22	Isaiah Jackson (injured)	6 ft 9 in (2.06 m)	205 lb (93 kg)	2002-01-10	Kentucky
G	29	Quenton Jackson (TW)	6 ft 5 in (1.96 m)	173 lb (78 kg)	1998-09-15	Texas A&M
F	16	James Johnson	6 ft 7 in (2.01 m)	240 lb (109 kg)	1987-02-20	Wake Forest
G/F	00	Bennedict Mathurin	6 ft 5 in (1.96 m)	210 lb (95 kg)	2002-06-19	Arizona
G	9	T. J. McConnell	6 ft 1 in (1.85 m)	190 lb (86 kg)	1992-03-25	Arizona
G	2	Andrew Nembhard	6 ft 4 in (1.93 m)	191 lb (87 kg)	2000-01-16	Gonzaga
G/F	23	Aaron Nesmith	6 ft 6 in (1.98 m)	215 lb (98 kg)	1999-10-16	Vanderbilt
G	26	Ben Sheppard	6 ft 6 in (1.98 m)	190 lb (86 kg)	2001-07-16	Belmont
F	43	Pascal Siakam	6 ft 8 in (2.03 m)	245 lb (111 kg)	1994-04-02	New Mexico State
F	1	Obi Toppin	6 ft 9 in (2.06 m)	220 lb (100 kg)	1998-03-04	Dayton
C	33	Myles Turner	6 ft 11 in (2.11 m)	250 lb (113 kg)	1996-03-24	Texas
F	5	Jarace Walker	6 ft 7 in (2.01 m)	235 lb (107 kg)	2003-09-04	Houston

Coaches
Head coach
- Rick Carlisle
Assistant(s)
- Maurice Baker
- Jenny Boucek
- Jim Boylen
- Jannero Pargo
- Lloyd Pierce
- Mike Weinar
- Isaac Yacob

Legend
- (DP) Unsigned draft pick
- (FA) Free agent
- (S) Suspended
- (GL) On assignment to G League affiliate
- (TW) Two-way affiliate player
- Injured

Roster
Updated: March 26, 2025

=== Oklahoma City Thunder ===
2024–25 Oklahoma City Thunder roster
Players

Pos.	No.	Player	Height	Weight	DOB	From
C	15	Branden Carlson (TW)	7 ft 0 in (2.13 m)	220 lb (100 kg)	1999-06-14	Utah
G	9	Alex Caruso	6 ft 5 in (1.96 m)	186 lb (84 kg)	1994-02-28	Texas A&M
F	13	Ousmane Dieng	6 ft 9 in (2.06 m)	185 lb (84 kg)	2003-05-21	France
G/F	5	Luguentz Dort	6 ft 4 in (1.93 m)	220 lb (100 kg)	1999-04-19	Arizona State
G/F	88	Alex Ducas (TW)	6 ft 7 in (2.01 m)	220 lb (100 kg)	2000-12-11	Saint Mary's
G	14	Adam Flagler (TW)	6 ft 3 in (1.91 m)	180 lb (82 kg)	1999-12-01	Baylor
G	2	Shai Gilgeous-Alexander	6 ft 6 in (1.98 m)	195 lb (88 kg)	1998-07-12	Kentucky
C	55	Isaiah Hartenstein	7 ft 0 in (2.13 m)	250 lb (113 kg)	1998-05-05	Germany
F/C	7	Chet Holmgren	7 ft 1 in (2.16 m)	208 lb (94 kg)	2002-05-01	Gonzaga
G	11	Isaiah Joe	6 ft 3 in (1.91 m)	165 lb (75 kg)	1999-07-02	Arkansas
F	3	Dillon Jones	6 ft 5 in (1.96 m)	235 lb (107 kg)	2001-10-29	Weber State
G	25	Ajay Mitchell	6 ft 5 in (1.96 m)	190 lb (86 kg)	2002-06-25	UC Santa Barbara
G	44	Nikola Topić (injured)	6 ft 6 in (1.98 m)	200 lb (91 kg)	2005-08-10	Serbia
G	22	Cason Wallace	6 ft 3 in (1.91 m)	195 lb (88 kg)	2003-11-07	Kentucky
G	21	Aaron Wiggins	6 ft 5 in (1.96 m)	190 lb (86 kg)	1999-01-02	Maryland
F	8	Jalen Williams	6 ft 5 in (1.96 m)	211 lb (96 kg)	2001-04-14	Santa Clara
C	6	Jaylin Williams	6 ft 9 in (2.06 m)	240 lb (109 kg)	2002-06-29	Arkansas
G/F	34	Kenrich Williams	6 ft 6 in (1.98 m)	210 lb (95 kg)	1994-12-02	TCU

Coaches
Head coach
- Mark Daigneault
Assistant(s)
- David Akinyooye
- Dave Bliss
- Chip Engelland
- Grant Gibbs
- Connor Johnson
- Eric Maynor
- Mike Wilks

Legend
- (DP) Unsigned draft pick
- (FA) Free agent
- (S) Suspended
- (GL) On assignment to G League affiliate
- (TW) Two-way affiliate player
- Injured

Roster
Updated: March 23, 2025

== Player statistics ==
Legend
GP	Games played	GS	Games started	MPG	Minutes per game
FG%	Field-goal percentage	3P%	3-point field-goal percentage	FT%	Free-throw percentage
RPG	Rebounds per game	APG	Assists per game	SPG	Steals per game
BPG	Blocks per game	PPG	Points per game

Indiana Pacers statistics
Player	GP	GS	MPG	FG%	3P%	FT%	RPG	APG	SPG	BPG	PPG
Pascal Siakam	7	7	33.4	.454	.357	.787	**7.7**	3.7	1.6	1.3	**19.3**
Tyrese Haliburton	7	7	30.0	.457	.356	**1.000**	4.6	**5.9**	1.1	0.6	14.0
Andrew Nembhard	7	7	**33.9**	.466	.423	.773	3.1	3.7	1.3	0.1	11.7
Myles Turner	7	7	27.1	.377	.214	.759	4.4	1.4	0.3	**1.4**	10.6
Aaron Nesmith	7	7	27.0	.386	.472	.714	5.9	1.0	0.9	0.7	9.4
Bennedict Mathurin	7	0	20.6	.421	.333	.780	5.1	1.3	0.6	0.7	12.4
T. J. McConnell	7	0	20.3	.552	**.600**	.778	3.6	4.3	**2.1**	0.1	12.0
Obi Toppin	7	0	23.8	.453	.361	.500	5.0	1.1	0.7	0.4	11.0
Tony Bradley	3	0	7.8	.500	—	.833	2.3	0.0	0.0	0.0	3.0
Ben Sheppard	7	0	13.6	.444	.333	—	2.1	0.1	0.7	0.1	2.9
Thomas Bryant	6	0	5.4	.500	.400	.500	0.3	0.2	0.0	0.2	1.7
James Johnson	2	0	2.4	.500	—	—	0.0	0.0	0.0	0.0	1.0
Johnny Furphy	4	0	3.0	**1.000**	—	.000	0.3	0.0	0.0	0.0	0.5

Oklahoma City Thunder statistics
Player	GP	GS	MPG	FG%	3P%	FT%	RPG	APG	SPG	BPG	PPG
Shai Gilgeous-Alexander	7	7	**38.2**	.443	.242	.914	4.6	**5.6**	1.9	**1.6**	**30.3**
Jalen Williams	7	7	34.7	.433	.267	.810	5.0	3.7	0.9	0.0	23.6
Chet Holmgren	7	7	30.3	.395	.158	.852	**8.9**	0.6	0.6	**1.6**	12.3
Luguentz Dort	7	7	31.4	.422	.447	.500	4.6	0.7	1.6	0.4	8.1
Isaiah Hartenstein	7	4	19.1	.609	—	.688	6.7	2.3	0.9	0.3	5.6
Cason Wallace	7	3	22.3	.474	.313	.500	2.6	0.7	1.7	0.6	6.0
Alex Caruso	7	0	28.8	.434	.400	.833	3.6	1.6	**2.4**	0.9	10.1
Aaron Wiggins	7	0	14.3	.364	.455	.700	2.0	0.7	0.6	0.3	5.9
Isaiah Joe	5	0	8.2	.615	.556	**1.000**	0.6	0.2	0.2	0.0	4.8
Jaylin Williams	3	0	4.9	.750	**.750**	.500	2.0	0.3	0.3	0.0	3.3
Dillon Jones	3	0	3.3	**1.000**	—	—	0.7	0.3	0.0	0.0	1.3
Kenrich Williams	7	0	7.9	.300	.167	.000	1.7	0.6	0.0	0.1	1.0
Ajay Mitchell	4	0	4.9	.143	.000	**1.000**	1.3	1.3	0.0	0.0	1.0
Ousmane Dieng	3	0	1.9	.333	.500	—	0.0	0.0	0.0	0.3	1.0

- Bold: team high

== Sponsorship ==
This was the final year of a multiyear partnership dating back to 2018 in which the internet television service YouTube TV was the presenting sponsor of the NBA Finals.

== Media coverage ==
The Finals was televised in the United States by ABC (including local affiliates KOCO-TV in Oklahoma City and WRTV in Indianapolis) for the 23rd consecutive year. Analyst Richard Jefferson joined play-by-play announcer Mike Breen, co-analyst Doris Burke, and sideline reporter Lisa Salters after JJ Redick left to become head coach of the Los Angeles Lakers. Breen called his record-extending 20th NBA Finals series on television. Salters was absent for Games 2–4 due to her mother's health issues, which was revealed by Breen during Game 2. ESPN Radio reporter Jorge Sedano filled in for her for the television coverage, while reporter Vanessa Richardson filled in for Sedano for the radio coverage of Games 2–4 before Salters returned for Game 5. The series was broadcast on ESPN Radio with play-by-play announcer Marc Kestecher, analyst P. J. Carlesimo, and Sedano.

The NBA and ABC faced criticism from viewers and sportswriters over a perceived lack of emphasis on the "pageantry" and magnitude of the NBA Finals in its media coverage. This included ABC's coverage not showing player introductions, which had not been done since 2013. The national anthem played only in the later matchups, notably when Tony Award winning actress Kristin Chenoweth performed. There was also a lack of branding on the court such as the NBA Finals logo or Larry O'Brien Trophy. This had not been done since 2014, when the NBA discontinued the decals due to player safety issues. This contrasted with the NBA Cup, in which dedicated court designs were used for each team. Sports media website Awful Announcing called ABC's coverage "auraless" for these and other reasons. In an apparent response to the criticism, ESPN began to display images of the trophy and NBA Finals logo on the court via virtual insertion beginning in Game 2 (which itself was criticized by viewers as a low-quality copout), and showed player introductions during Game 5. After the Finals, Doris Burke was demoted to the B team, while Tim Legler was promoted to team with Jefferson and Breen.

=== Viewership ===
Game 1 was the third least-watched NBA Finals Game 1 since 1988. Only the 2020 and 2021 Finals, which were both delayed by the COVID-19 pandemic, had a lower-rated opener. NBA commissioner Adam Silver defended the ratings before Game 3, saying, "People compare us to 20 years ago, but Games 1 and 2 are the highest-rated programs in May and June so far on television". Game 7 averaged 16.35 million viewers and peaked with 19.28 million, marking the most-watched NBA game since Game 6 of the 2019 NBA Finals. Despite the strong finish, the series as a whole averaged just 10.27 million viewers, making it the least-watched Finals since 2021—and, excluding the COVID-delayed 2020 and 2021 editions, the lowest average since 2007. Moreover, Game 7 was the least-watched of its kind in modern ratings annals. Despite that, Game 7 was the most-ever internationally watched NBA Finals game on NBA League Pass, and the Finals averaged 10 million viewers or more per game. The NBA also generated a record-breaking 5 billion views across all social media platforms during the Finals, up 215% from 2024.

Game	Ratings (American households)	American audience (in millions)	Ref
1	4.7	8.91	
2	4.5	8.76	
3	4.8	9.19	
4	4.6	9.41	
5	4.9	9.54	
6	4.8	9.28	
7	7.6	16.35	
Avg	5.6	10.27	

== Aftermath ==
A day after Game 7, it was revealed that Tyrese Haliburton tore his Achilles tendon; he therefore missed the entire 2025–26 NBA season. ESPN sportswriter Brian Windhorst said of the injury, "I'd hate to even say this, but he might have scored 40 points in this game. We'll never know, but he had nine points in seven minutes. The Thunder were looking a little shaky. It's possible he has a game that is an all-time classic." In an unlucky coincidence, Haliburton was the third player to wear the number "0" and tear his Achilles tendon in the 2025 NBA playoffs, after Damian Lillard and Jayson Tatum.

The victory parade and championship celebration for the Thunder was held in downtown Oklahoma City on June 24, concluding outside of the Paycom Center. According to the Oklahoma Voice, around 500,000 people attended.

Without Haliburton and a various injuries to other key players, the Pacers had their worst-ever start to a season in 2025–26, beginning 1–12, which was also the worst for any team in NBA history that made the previous season's NBA Finals. They finished with a 19–63 record, the worst in franchise history.

Meanwhile, the 2025–26 Thunder went 24–1 in their first 25 games, tying the 2015–16 Warriors for the best 25-game start in NBA history. They finished 64–18, just four games off the pace they set in 2024–25 despite All-Star forward Jalen Williams missing much of the season due to a recurring hamstring strain. They swept through the first two rounds of the NBA playoffs before meeting the Spurs, led by Victor Wembanyama, in the Western Conference Finals. The Thunder lost the series in seven games at home, failing in their quest to become the first team since the 2017–2018 Warriors to repeat as champion.

== See also ==
- 2025 NBA playoffs
