= Branden Carlson =

American basketball player (born 1999)

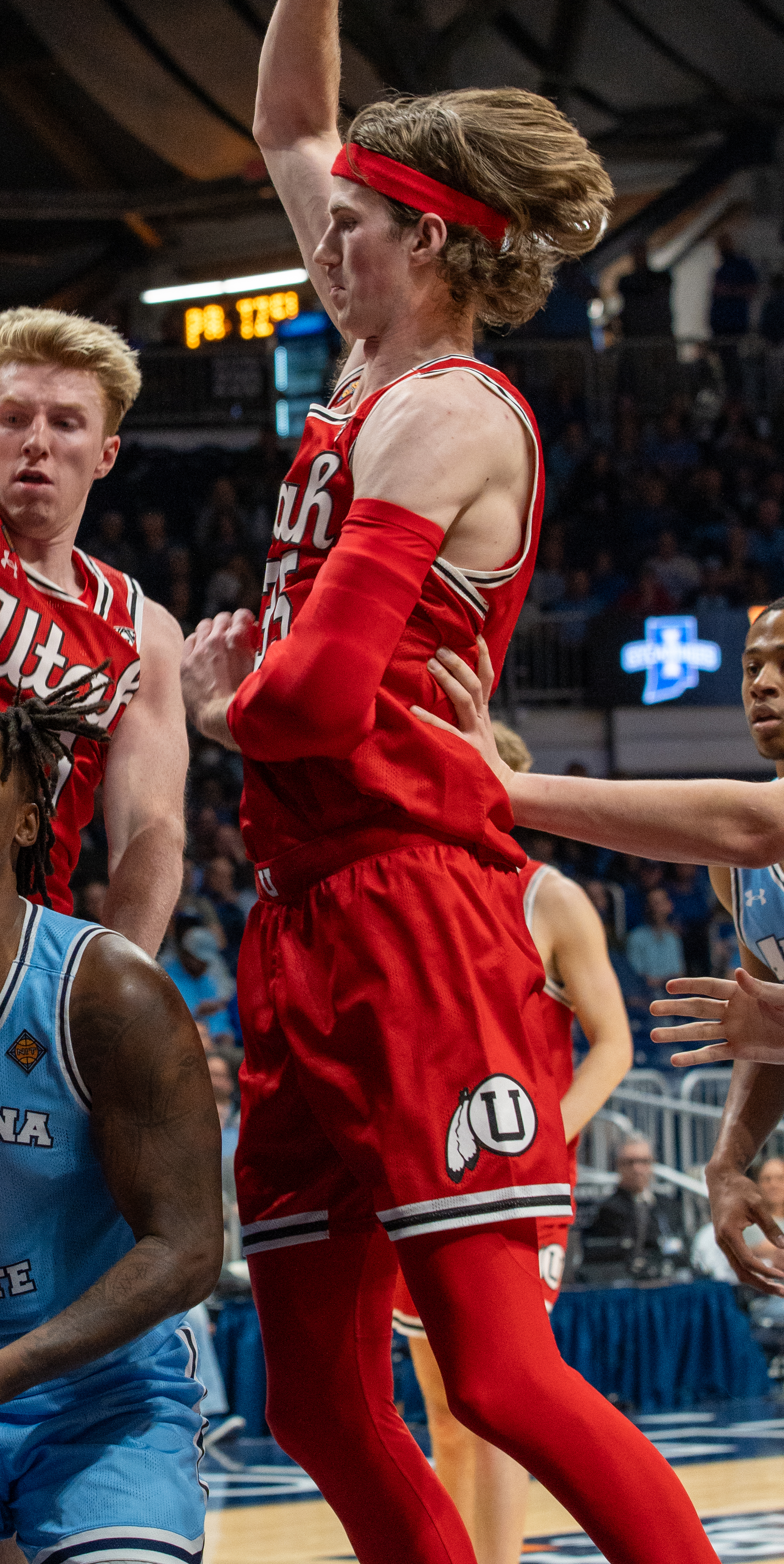
- Carlson with Utah in 2024

No. 10 – Portland Trail Blazers
- Position: Center
- League: NBA

Personal information
- Born: June 14, 1999 (age 27) South Jordan, Utah, U.S.
- Listed height: 7 ft 0 in (2.13 m)
- Listed weight: 220 lb (100 kg)

Career information
- High school: Bingham (South Jordan, Utah)
- College: Utah (2019–2024)
- NBA draft: 2024: undrafted
- Playing career: 2024–present

Career history
- 2024: Raptors 905
- 2024–2026: Oklahoma City Thunder
- 2024–2026: →Oklahoma City Blue
- 2026–present: Portland Trail Blazers

Career highlights
- NBA champion (2025); 2× First-team All-Pac-12 (2023, 2024); Second-team All-Pac-12 (2022)
- Stats at NBA.com
- Stats at Basketball Reference

Branden Carlson (born June 14, 1999) is an American professional basketball player for the Portland Trail Blazers of the National Basketball Association (NBA). He played college basketball for the Utah Utes.

== Early life and high school career ==
Carlson grew up in South Jordan, Utah and attended Bingham High School. Carlson was a consensus four star recruit. He committed to play college basketball at Utah over offers from UCLA, Stanford, BYU, UNLV, Utah State, UC Davis, Santa Clara and Weber State.

College recruiting
| Name | Hometown | School | Height | Weight | Commit date |
|---|---|---|---|---|---|
| Branden Carlson; PF / C | South Jordan, UT | Bingham | 6 ft 10 in (2.08 m) | 205 lb (93 kg) | Oct 23, 2016 |
| Branden Carlson; PF / C | Recruit ratings: Rivals: 247Sports: ESPN: (80) | | | | |
Overall recruit ranking: Rivals: 66 247Sports: 153 ESPN: N/A
Note: In many cases, Scout, Rivals, 247Sports, On3, and ESPN may conflict in their listings of height and weight.; In these cases, the average was taken. ESPN grades are on a 100-point scale.; Sources: "2017 Utah Basketball Commitment List". Rivals.; "2017 Utah Utes Recruiting Class". ESPN.; "2017 Team Ranking". Rivals.

== College career ==
After serving a two-year mission for The Church of Jesus Christ of Latter-day Saints (LDS Church), Carlson enrolled at Utah before the start of the 2019–20 season. Carlson played in 30 games with 29 starts during his freshman season and averaged 7.0 points, 3.9 rebounds and 1.4 blocks per game. He averaged 9.4 points, 4.6 rebounds and 1.7 blocks as a sophomore. Carlson averaged 13.6 points, 6.1 rebounds and 1.6 blocks and was named second-team All-Pac-12 Conference as a junior.

He averaged 16.4 points, 7.5 rebounds and 2.0 blocks per game as a senior and was named first-team All-Pac-12. Carlson considered entering the 2023 NBA draft, but ultimately decided to utilize the extra year of eligibility granted to college athletes who played in the 2020 season due to the COVID-19 pandemic and return to Utah for a fifth season. In his final year, he averaged 17.0 points, 6.6 rebounds, 1.6 assists and 1.5 blocks per game, and made the First-team All-Pac-12 for the second time. Carlson became the all-time blocks leader for Utah during a home loss to Arizona State, eventually finishing the season with 241 blocks. In that year's NIT, Carlson averaged 16.8 points, 5.0 rebounds and 1.8 blocks over four tournament games, with Utah eventually falling in the semifinals to Indiana State.

== Professional career ==
=== Raptors 905 (2024) ===
After going undrafted in the 2024 NBA draft, Carlson signed a two-way contract with the Toronto Raptors on July 4, 2024, joining former Ute Jakob Pöltl. However, he was waived on October 19, 2024. On October 28, he joined Raptors 905. Carlson played four preseason games with the Raptors, averaging 5.3 minutes per game. He averaged 1.8 points, 1.3 rebounds and 0.5 assists per game.

=== Oklahoma City Thunder / Blue (2024–2026) ===
On November 16, 2024, after the injuries of Isaiah Hartenstein, Chet Holmgren and Jaylin Williams, Carlson signed with the Oklahoma City Thunder. Throughout his rookie season, he was assigned several times to the Oklahoma City Blue. On January 7, 2025, he was waived by the Thunder. Three days later, he signed a 10-day contract with the Thunder. Against the Cleveland Cavaliers on January 16, Carlson recorded 11 points and 4 rebounds, making 3 three-pointers off the bench in a blowout win. On January 22, he signed another 10-day contract with the Thunder. On February 6, he signed a two-way contract with the Thunder and the Blue. In Oklahoma City's final regular-season game against the New Orleans Pelicans, Carlson recorded a season-high 26 points, 10 rebounds and 3 blocks in a double-digit win. Carlson finished his rookie season an NBA champion when the Thunder defeated the Indiana Pacers in seven games in the 2025 NBA Finals.

On July 8, 2025, Carlson re-signed with Oklahoma City on a two-way contract. On April 12, 2026, Carlson tied a career–high in points with 26, also chipping in 10 rebounds, five blocks, two steals and one assist as part of a 135–103 loss to the Phoenix Suns. Carlson made 32 appearances for Oklahoma City during the 2025–26 NBA season, posting averages of 3.8 points, 3.0 rebounds, and 0.7 assists.

=== Portland Trail Blazers (2026–present) ===
On July 1, 2026, Carlson signed a one-year, $2.5 million contract with the Portland Trail Blazers.

== Career statistics ==
Legend
| GP | Games played | GS | Games started | MPG | Minutes per game |
| FG% | Field goal percentage | 3P% | 3-point field goal percentage | FT% | Free throw percentage |
| RPG | Rebounds per game | APG | Assists per game | SPG | Steals per game |
| BPG | Blocks per game | PPG | Points per game | **Bold** | Career high |
| † | Won an NBA championship |

=== NBA ===
| Year | Team | GP | GS | MPG | FG% | 3P% | FT% | RPG | APG | SPG | BPG | PPG |
|---|---|---|---|---|---|---|---|---|---|---|---|---|
| 2024–25† | Oklahoma City | 32 | 0 | 7.7 | .443 | .333 | **.778** | 1.7 | .4 | **.2** | **.7** | 3.8 |
| 2025–26 | Oklahoma City | **42** | **4** | **11.6** | **.527** | **.360** | .577 | **3.0** | **.7** | **.2** | .6 | **5.8** |
| Career | | 74 | 4 | 9.9 | .498 | .349 | .659 | 2.4 | .6 | .2 | .6 | 4.9 |

=== College ===
| Year | Team | GP | GS | MPG | FG% | 3P% | FT% | RPG | APG | SPG | BPG | PPG |
|---|---|---|---|---|---|---|---|---|---|---|---|---|
| 2019–20 | Utah | 30 | 29 | 20.9 | .549 | .231 | .622 | 3.9 | .8 | .3 | 1.4 | 7.0 |
| 2020–21 | Utah | 25 | 21 | 23.4 | **.551** | **.500** | .609 | 4.6 | .7 | .2 | 1.7 | 9.4 |
| 2021–22 | Utah | 24 | 23 | 26.0 | .510 | .309 | **.818** | 6.0 | 1.1 | .3 | 1.6 | 13.6 |
| 2022–23 | Utah | 31 | 31 | 29.1 | .495 | .331 | .774 | **7.5** | 1.5 | .3 | **2.0** | 16.3 |
| 2023–24 | Utah | **36** | **36** | **29.6** | .501 | .379 | .714 | 6.6 | **1.6** | **.4** | 1.5 | **17.0** |
| Career | | 146 | 140 | 26.1 | .513 | .354 | .728 | 5.8 | 1.2 | .3 | 1.7 | 12.9 |

== Personal life ==
Carlson is a member of The Church of Jesus Christ of Latter-day Saints. He served a two-year mission for the church in Manchester, England.

Carlson married Maddy Woolf in the summer of 2020. His father, Bryan Carlson, played basketball at Chico State, and his brother, Devin Carlson, plays forward for Salt Lake Community College's basketball team.
