= 2018–19 NBA G League season =

- League: NBA G League
- Sport: Basketball

Draft
- Top draft pick: Willie Reed
- Picked by: Salt Lake City Stars

Regular season
- Top seed: Long Island Nets; Rio Grande Valley Vipers
- Season MVP: Chris Boucher (Raptors 905)

Finals
- Champions: Rio Grande Valley Vipers
- Runners-up: Long Island Nets
- Finals MVP: Isaiah Hartenstein (Rio Grande Valley)

NBA G League seasons
- ← 2017–18 2019–20 →

The 2018–19 NBA G League season was the 18th season of the NBA G League, the official minor league basketball organization owned by the National Basketball Association (NBA).

== League changes ==
The league expanded by one team, the Capital City Go-Go owned by the Washington Wizards, to have 27 teams for the season.

There were three relocations, with two of them within the team's existing market. The most significant relocation was that of the Reno Bighorns, which were moved by their parent club, the Sacramento Kings, to Stockton, California and renamed the Stockton Kings. One of the in-market relocations was that of the Delaware 87ers, which were moved into a new nearby facility in Wilmington from their former home in Newark, and rebranded as the Delaware Blue Coats. Finally, the Rio Grande Valley Vipers moved within the urban area at the southernmost end of Texas, going from Hidalgo to nearby Edinburg with the opening of Bert Ogden Arena.

With the addition of the Go-Go, the league slightly realigned its six divisions. The Go-Go were added to the Southeast and Delaware was shifted to the Atlantic.

During the season, league president Malcolm Turner stepped down to become the athletics director at Vanderbilt University. He was replaced by Shareef Abdur-Rahim.

== Regular season ==
Final standings:

x – qualified for playoffs; y – Division champion; z – Conference champion

=== Eastern Conference ===
Atlantic Division

Team (affiliate)	W	L	PCT	GB	Home	Road
z – Long Island Nets (BKN)	34	16	.680	0	19–6	15–10
x – Westchester Knicks (NYK)	29	21	.580	5	16–9	13–12
x – Raptors 905 (TOR)	29	21	.580	5	13–12	16–9
Delaware Blue Coats (PHI)	21	29	.420	13	13–12	8–17
Maine Red Claws (BOS)	19	31	.380	15	11–14	8–17

Central Division

Team (affiliate)	W	L	PCT	GB	Home	Road
y – Grand Rapids Drive (DET)	28	22	.560	0	14–11	14–11
x – Windy City Bulls (CHI)	27	23	.540	1	15–10	12–13
Fort Wayne Mad Ants (IND)	23	27	.460	5	14–11	9–16
Canton Charge (CLE)	22	28	.429	6	10–15	12–13
Wisconsin Herd (MIL)	12	38	.240	16	8–17	4–21

Southeast Division

Team (affiliate)	W	L	PCT	GB	Home	Road
y – Lakeland Magic (ORL)	32	18	.640	0	18–7	14–11
Capital City Go-Go (WAS)	25	25	.500	7	14–11	11–14
Greensboro Swarm (CHA)	24	26	.480	8	10–15	14–11
Erie BayHawks (ATL)	24	26	.469	8	17–8	7–18

=== Western Conference ===
Midwest Division

Team (affiliate)	W	L	PCT	GB	Home	Road
y – Oklahoma City Blue (OKC)	34	16	.680	0	17–8	17–8
x – Memphis Hustle (MEM)	28	22	.560	6	16–9	12–13
Sioux Falls Skyforce (MIA)	24	26	.480	10	13–12	11–14
Iowa Wolves (MIN)	20	30	.400	14	13–12	7–18

Pacific Division

Team (affiliate)	W	L	PCT	GB	Home	Road
y – Santa Cruz Warriors (GSW)	34	16	.680	0	20–5	14–11
x – Stockton Kings (SAC)	30	20	.600	4	18–7	12–13
Agua Caliente Clippers (LAC)	26	24	.520	8	14–11	12–13
South Bay Lakers (LAL)	21	29	.420	13	13–12	8–17
Northern Arizona Suns (PHX)	12	38	.240	22	7–18	5–20

Southwest Division

Team (affiliate)	W	L	PCT	GB	Home	Road
z – Rio Grande Valley Vipers (HOU)	34	16	.680	0	18–7	16–9
x – Salt Lake City Stars (UTA)	27	23	.540	7	15–10	12–13
Austin Spurs (SAS)	20	30	.400	14	13–12	7–18
Texas Legends (DAL)	16	34	.320	18	14–11	2–23

== Playoffs ==
For the second straight season, the league enacted a six-team playoff, with one-game series for the first three rounds and first-round byes for the top two seeds in each conference. For the Finals, a tiebreaker was required since both teams had the same record, for which there existed three tiebreakers: best winning percentage against each other, record against the other conference, or random drawing, which resulted in the Long Island Nets hosting the first and last game of the Finals against the Rio Grande Valley Vipers. The Nets won Game 1 117–107, but the Vipers won Game 2 127–116 and then won the series in Game 3 129–112 to win their third league title, most for any team in history.

First Round (March 26 & March 27)	Conference Semifinals (March 29)
1	Long Island Nets	112
4	Raptors 905	99
4	Raptors 905	91
5	Grand Rapids Drive	90
Eastern Conference
2	Lakeland Magic	104
3	Westchester Knicks	91
3	Westchester Knicks	95
6	Windy City Bulls	82
1	Rio Grande Valley Vipers	135
5	Memphis Hustle	118
4	Stockton Kings	119
5	Memphis Hustle	122
Western Conference
2	Santa Cruz Warriors	117
3	Oklahoma City Blue	102
3	Oklahoma City Blue	118
6	Salt Lake City Stars	113

Conference Finals (April 2)
1	Long Island Nets	108
2	Lakeland Magic	106
1	Rio Grande Valley Vipers	144
2	Santa Cruz Warriors	125

Finals (April 7, 9, 12); Best-of-three
E1	Long Island Nets	1
W1	Rio Grande Valley Vipers	2

=== Finals boxscore ===
April 7, 2019
7:00 p.m. ET

Recap and Boxscore

Rio Grande Valley Vipers 107, Long Island Nets 117
Scoring by quarter: 18–37, 31–22, 27–31, 31–27
Pts: Jordan Johnson 23; Rebs: Isaiah Hartenstein 17; Asts: Jordan Johnson 3	Pts: Dzanan Musa23; Thomas Wimbush 23; Rebs: Alan Williams 16; Asts: Tahjere McCall 4

Island Federal Credit Union Arena, Stony Brook, New York
Attendance: 2,431
Referees:
- #16 Nate Green
- #65 Andy Nagy
- #76 Toni Patillo
- #31

April 9, 2019
8:00 p.m. ET

Recap and Boxscore

Long Island Nets 116, Rio Grande Valley Vipers 127
Scoring by quarter: 27–27, 29–37, 30–30, 30–33
Pts: Theo Pinson 32; Rebs: Theo Pinson 11; Asts: Jordan McLaughlin 6	Pts: Isaiah Hartenstein 33; Rebs: Isaiah Hartenstein 13; Asts: Jordan Johnson 9

Bert Ogden Arena, Edinburg, Texas
Attendance: 8,208
Referees:
- #17 Matt Kallio
- #49 Evan Scott
- #35 John Butler

April 12, 2019
8:00 p.m. ET

Boxscore
Play-by-Play

Rio Grande Valley Vipers 129, Long Island Nets 112
Scoring by quarter: 38–24, 37–23, 28–27, 26–38
Pts: Isaiah Hartenstein 30; Rebs: Isaiah Hartenstein 17; Asts: Michael Frazier II 6	Pts: Alan Williams 26; Rebs: Alan Williams 21; Asts: Jordan McLaughlin 9
Rio Grande Valley wins series, 2–1

Island Federal Credit Union Arena, Stony Brook, New York
Attendance: 2,783
Referees:
- #49 Evan Scott
- #16 Nate Green
- #42 Kevin Fahy
- #35 John Butler

== Statistics ==
=== Individual statistic leaders ===
Category	Player	Team	Statistic
Points per game	Jordan McRae	Capital City Go-Go	30.4
Rebounds per game	Isaiah Hartenstein	Rio Grande Valley Vipers	14.8
Assists per game	Marcus Williams	Stockton Kings	9.6
Steals per game	Gary Payton II	Rio Grande Valley Vipers	3.0
Blocks per game	Amida Brimah	Austin Spurs	3.0
Turnovers per game	Gary Payton II	Rio Grande Valley Vipers	3.9
Fouls per game	Norvel Pelle	Delaware Blue Coats	3.7
Minutes per game	Nick Johnson	Wisconsin Herd	35.5
FG%	Norvel Pelle	Delaware Blue Coats	70.3
FT%	Dusty Hannahs	Memphis Hustle	92.6
3FG%	Keith Hornsby	Texas Legends	48.5
+/−	Chris Boucher	Raptors 905	8.4
Double-doubles	Ángel Delgado	Agua Caliente Clippers	36
Triple-doubles	Shannon Scott	Long Island Nets	3

=== Individual game highs ===
Category	Player	Team	Statistic
Points	Tyler Harvey	Memphis Hustle	58
Rebounds	Angel Delgado	Agua Caliente Clippers	31
Assists	Shannon Scott	Long Island Nets	20
Steals	Brianté Weber	Sioux Falls Skyforce	8
Blocks	Chris Boucher	Raptors 905	9
Three-pointers	Tyler Harvey	Memphis Hustle	12

=== Team statistic leaders ===
Category	Team	Statistic
Points per game	Long Island Nets	117.7
Rebounds per game	Long Island Nets	53.9
Assists per game	Erie BayHawks	26.7
Steals per game	Santa Cruz Warriors	10.8
Blocks per game	Austin Spurs	7.8
Turnovers per game	Rio Grande Valley Vipers	19.8
FG%	Agua Caliente Clippers	47.9
FT%	Lakeland Magic	78.6
3FG%	Lakeland Magic	37.8
+/−	Oklahoma City Blue	5.2
