= Jalen Williams =

American basketball player (born 2001)

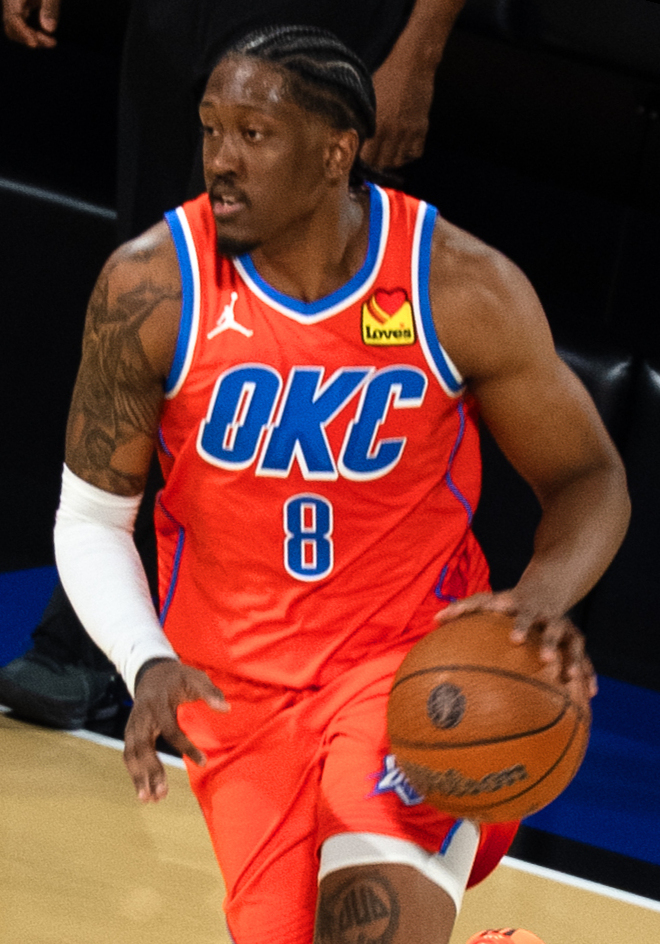
- Williams with the Oklahoma City Thunder in 2025

No. 8 – Oklahoma City Thunder
- Position: Shooting guard / small forward
- League: NBA

Personal information
- Born: April 14, 2001 (age 25) Denver, Colorado, U.S.
- Listed height: 6 ft 5 in (1.96 m)
- Listed weight: 211 lb (96 kg)

Career information
- High school: Perry (Gilbert, Arizona)
- College: Santa Clara (2019–2022)
- NBA draft: 2022: 1st round, 12th overall pick
- Drafted by: Oklahoma City Thunder
- Playing career: 2022–present

Career history
- 2022–present: Oklahoma City Thunder

Career highlights
- NBA champion (2025); NBA All-Star (2025); All-NBA Third Team (2025); NBA All-Defensive Second Team (2025); NBA All-Rookie First Team (2023); First-team All-WCC (2022); No. 24 retired by Santa Clara Broncos
- Stats at NBA.com
- Stats at Basketball Reference

Jalen Devonn Williams (born April 14, 2001), nicknamed J-Dub, is an American professional basketball player for the Oklahoma City Thunder of the National Basketball Association (NBA). He played three seasons of college basketball for the Santa Clara Broncos before declaring for the 2022 NBA draft, where he was selected 12th overall by the Thunder. Williams was named to his first NBA All-Star Game and All-NBA Team in 2025, later winning an NBA championship that same year.

== High school career ==
Williams played basketball at Perry High School in Gilbert, Arizona. Starting off as a six-foot-tall (180 cm) point guard, Williams grew five inches from his sophomore to senior year of high school. Despite this, Santa Clara still listed him as a 6 ft 3 in (1.91 m) guard when Williams signed his national letter of intent. As a senior, Williams was ranked 9th among prep players in Arizona by 247Sports. Williams ended his high school career averaging more than 25 points per game in his senior year, being named the Chandler Unified School District Player of the Year as a junior, and was awarded the 2017–18 Region Offensive Player of the Year.

=== Recruiting ===
Rated as a three-star recruit by major recruiting services 247Sports and Rivals, Williams committed to Santa Clara over offers from Hofstra and Nevada.

College recruiting
Name	Hometown	School	Height	Weight	Commit date
Jalen Williams; SG	Gilbert, AZ	Perry (AZ)	6 ft 3 in (1.91 m)	180 lb (82 kg)	Nov 2, 2018
Jalen Williams; SG	Recruit ratings: Rivals: 247Sports:				
Overall recruit ranking: 247Sports: 230
Note: In many cases, Scout, Rivals, 247Sports, On3, and ESPN may conflict in their listings of height and weight.; In these cases, the average was taken. ESPN grades are on a 100-point scale.; Sources: "Santa Clara 2019 Basketball Commitments". Rivals.; "2019 Santa Clara Basketball Commits". Scout.; "ESPN". ESPN.; "Scout.com Team Recruiting Rankings". Scout.; "2019 Team Ranking". Rivals.

== College career ==
On November 5, 2019, Williams made his debut for Santa Clara, recording 13 points, 5 rebounds, 4 assists and 2 steals against UC Santa Cruz. As a freshman, Williams played in all 33 games, starting in the final 23 games while leading the team in steals with 44—which ranked third on the school's all-time freshman list. Against Mississippi Valley State, Williams had season bests with 19 points, 7 rebounds and career highs in field goals, three-pointers and assists. He finished his freshman season averaging 7.7 points in 25.5 minutes. In his sophomore season, Williams started in all of his 18 appearances and was second on the team in scoring and free throw percentage. In the opening round of the 2021 WCC tournament, Williams recorded his first career double-double with 13 points and a career-high 10 rebounds against Pepperdine in a 78–70 loss. He increased his scoring average to 11.5 points in 31.6 minutes in his sophomore season.

In his final season with Santa Clara, Williams emerged as a scorer, finishing second in the WCC with 18.0 points per game while shooting 51.3%. In 31 out of 33 games, Williams scored in double figures including scoring 16 or more points in 21 games. Against Hawaii, Williams registered a career-high 30 points with four rebounds and four assists on November 30, 2021. On January 27, 2022, Williams hit a game-winning shot against BYU while finishing with 26 points. On March 15, 2022, in the 2022 NIT, Williams played his final collegiate game, finishing with 19 points, 15 rebounds and 4 assists in a 63–50 loss against Washington State. At the end of the season, Williams was named as a First Team All-WCC selection, Second Team NABC All-District, and was named as a finalist for the Lou Henson Award, given to the nation's top mid-major player.

As a three-year guard, Williams finished his collegiate career as a two-time All-WCC choice and reached 1,000 career points as a junior after averaging 12.6 points on 46.9% shooting for his career. On March 31, 2022, Williams declared for the 2022 NBA draft while maintaining his collegiate eligibility.

== Professional career ==
=== Oklahoma City Thunder (2022–present) ===
Described as a long, smooth small forward who can score on strong efficiency numbers while showing a sense of urgency and can use his length to contest shots, Williams was drafted 12th overall by the Oklahoma City Thunder in the 2022 NBA draft with a pick the Thunder acquired from the Clippers in the 2019 Paul George trade. With the selection, Williams became the first Santa Clara player to be drafted since Steve Nash in 1996. He is currently the highest-drafted Bronco prospect in the modern era and the second highest in Santa Clara history behind Ken Sears in 1955.

==== 2022–2023: All-Rookie honors ====
On October 19, 2022, Williams made his NBA debut, putting up 5 points in 6 minutes before taking a hit defending a dunk attempt by Jaden McDaniels. He would leave the game and later undergo surgery to address a right orbital bone fracture. After missing four games, Williams started sporadically for the Thunder until forward Jeremiah Robinson-Earl suffered a right ankle sprain which made him the full-time starter. With guard Shai Gilgeous-Alexander sidelined, Williams scored 27 points and helped rallied the Thunder from a 20-point second-half deficit against the San Antonio Spurs on November 30, 2022. The next day, he was named NBA Rookie of the Month for October/November after averaging 10.7 points on 52.4% shooting, 3.2 rebounds and 2.6 assists. He became the third Thunder rookie to win Rookie of the Month honors after Russell Westbrook and Josh Giddey.

On January 31, 2023, Williams was named to the 2023 Rising Stars Challenge after averaging 12.1 points, 3.9 rebounds, 2.8 assists and 1.7 steals in 46 games. Against the Utah Jazz, Williams recorded a career-high 32 points on 12–15 shooting in a 129–119 win. Without Gilgeous-Alexander, Williams was one point shy of tying his then career high with 31 points along with 4 steals in a 137–134 loss to the Charlotte Hornets. After the Thunder fell two games under .500, Williams had a putback with less than a second in a 107–106 win after Josh Giddey's hook shot rolled off. He led the Thunder with 27 points, 8 rebounds and 6 assists and joined Kevin Durant and Russell Westbrook to have three or more games with at least 25 points, 5 rebounds and 5 assists in a season as a rookie. Williams was later named his second NBA Rookie of the Month award for March and April. In his rookie season, Williams averaged 14.1 points on 52% shooting and finished second in NBA Rookie of the Year voting with 75 second place votes and 16 third place votes. Williams was later named to the NBA All-Rookie First Team becoming the second Thunder player to be named to it and the fifth Thunder player overall to be named to an All-Rookie team.

==== 2023–2024: First playoff appearance ====
On December 27, 2023, Williams scored a career-high 36 points in a 129–120 win over the New York Knicks. On January 23, 2024, Williams put up 19 points alongside a game-winning jump shot in a 111–109 win over the Portland Trail Blazers. Williams helped lead the Thunder to a 57–25 record and their first Western Conference first seed since 2013, entering the 2024 NBA playoffs. It was also his first playoff appearance.

In his playoff debut on April 21, 2024, Williams recorded 19 points, seven rebounds, four assists and two steals in a 94–92 Game 1 win over the New Orleans Pelicans in the opening round of the NBA playoffs. The Thunder advanced to the Conference Semifinals but were eliminated in six games by the Dallas Mavericks, despite Williams' near triple-double performance in the final game, where he had 22 points, nine rebounds, eight assists and zero turnovers.

==== 2024–2025: First All-Star selection, All-NBA honors and NBA championship ====
On January 30, 2025, Williams was named as reserve for the 2025 NBA All-Star Game, his first selection. On March 2, Williams scored a career-high 41 points along with six rebounds and six assists in a 146–132 win over the San Antonio Spurs. At the end of the season, Williams was named to the All-NBA Third Team, marking his first career All-NBA selection. He was also named to the NBA All-Defensive Second Team, another first in his career.

Williams attracted criticism for his offensive performance during the Western Conference Semifinals against the Denver Nuggets. Excluding Game 2, in which he posted 17 points and seven assists in a 149–106 blowout win, and Game 3 when he scored a team-high 32 points in a 113–104 overtime defeat, Williams shot a combined 24% from the field and 21% from behind the three-point-line from Game 1 through 6. He faced particular scrutiny for his outing in Game 6, in which he posted just six points on 3-of-16 shooting in a 119–107 loss. He bounced back in Game 7 however, scoring 24 points in a 125–93 victory over the Nuggets, eliminating them and allowing him his first Western Conference Finals appearance. On May 26, in Game 4 of the Western Conference Finals, Williams scored a then-playoff career-high 34 points, helping the Thunder to a 128–126 win over the Minnesota Timberwolves and a 3–1 lead in the series. After the Thunder won the series in five games, they advanced to the NBA Finals for the first time since 2012, marking the first Finals appearance of Williams' career.

In Game 5 of the 2025 NBA Finals against the Indiana Pacers, Williams scored a new playoff career-high 40 points in a 120–109 victory to give the Thunder a 3–2 lead in the series. He became the third-youngest player to score at least 40 points in a Finals game, trailing only Magic Johnson and Russell Westbrook. Williams also recorded at least 25 points and five rebounds in three consecutive NBA Finals games, becoming the first player under the age of 25 to achieve such a streak since Shaquille O'Neal in 1995. Oklahoma City won the series 4–3, with Williams contributing 20 points, four rebounds, four assists and two steals in the decisive Game 7. Williams revealed that he received about 30 painkilling injections in his injured right wrist during the 2025 NBA playoffs. On June 30, it was announced that he would undergo surgery to repair a torn ligament in the same wrist.

==== 2025–2026: Contract extension and injury-riddled season ====
On July 13, 2025, Williams signed a five-year contract extension that could be worth $287 million with the Thunder. During the regular season, Williams missed more than half of the games due to injury issues. In the playoffs, Williams and the Thunder were eliminated by the San Antonio Spurs in seven games in the Western Conference Finals. He also missed several postseason games due to injury and did not play in Game 7, which the Thunder lost 111–103.

==== 2026–2027: Significant leg injury ====
On October 20, 2026, Williams made his regular season return from injury in a Western Conference Finals rematch with the San Antonio Spurs, recording 12 points and seven rebounds in a 116–104 season opening road victory. Two days later, Williams scored 21 points and grabbed five rebounds in a defensive battle, defeating the Denver Nuggets 96–84.

On October 25 during a 108–101 win over the Los Angeles Clippers, Williams suffered a severe lower leg injury after getting fouled and colliding with Derrick Jones Jr. while driving to the basket. He was subsequently stretchered off of the court and was diagnosed with fractured fibula and dislocated ankle.

== National team career ==
In preparation for the 2023 FIBA Basketball World Cup, Williams was selected to the 2023 USA Basketball Men's Select team alongside Thunder teammate Chet Holmgren.

== Career statistics ==
Legend
GP	Games played	GS	Games started	MPG	Minutes per game
FG%	Field goal percentage	3P%	3-point field goal percentage	FT%	Free throw percentage
RPG	Rebounds per game	APG	Assists per game	SPG	Steals per game
BPG	Blocks per game	PPG	Points per game	**Bold**	Career high
†	Won an NBA championship	*	Led the league

=== NBA ===
==== Regular season ====
Year	Team	GP	GS	MPG	FG%	3P%	FT%	RPG	APG	SPG	BPG	PPG
2022–23	Oklahoma City	**75**	62	30.3	.521	.356	.812	4.5	3.3	1.4	.5	14.1
2023–24	Oklahoma City	71	**71**	31.3	**.540**	**.427**	.814	4.0	4.5	1.1	.6	19.1
2024–25†	Oklahoma City	69	69	**32.4**	.484	.365	.789	**5.3**	5.1	**1.6**	**.7**	**21.6**
2025–26	Oklahoma City	33	33	28.4	.484	.299	**.837**	4.6	**5.5**	1.2	.3	17.1
Career		251	238	30.9	.508	.374	.808	4.6	4.4	1.3	.5	17.9
All-Star		1	0	6.6	.333	.000	—	.0	1.0	1.0	1.0	2.0

==== Playoffs ====
Year	Team	GP	GS	MPG	FG%	3P%	FT%	RPG	APG	SPG	BPG	PPG
2024	Oklahoma City	10	10	**37.7**	.469	.385	**.815**	**6.8**	**5.4**	**1.7**	**.5**	18.7
2025†	Oklahoma City	**23***	**23***	34.6	.449	.304	.789	5.5	4.8	1.4	.4	**21.4**
2026	Oklahoma City	5	4	21.4	**.518**	**.417**	.750	3.2	2.8	1.0	.4	14.4
Career		38	37	33.7	.461	.331	.790	5.6	4.7	1.4	.4	19.8

=== College ===
Year	Team	GP	GS	MPG	FG%	3P%	FT%	RPG	APG	SPG	BPG	PPG
2019–20	Santa Clara	**33**	22	25.5	.436	.352	.763	2.8	1.9	**1.3**	0.5	7.7
2020–21	Santa Clara	18	17	31.6	.399	.274	.757	4.1	2.3	1.2	**0.6**	11.5
2021–22	Santa Clara	**33**	**33**	**34.8**	**.513**	**.396**	**.809**	**4.4**	**4.2**	1.2	0.5	**18.0**
Career		84	72	30.5	.469	.352	.785	3.7	2.9	1.2	.5	12.6

== Personal life ==
Williams was born in Denver, Colorado, but moved to Gilbert, Arizona when he was 7 years old. His parents – Ronald and Nicole Williams – were both members of the United States Air Force. His younger brother, Cody Williams, was a consensus five-star recruit who plays for the Minnesota Timberwolves.

Williams is also an investor in USL Championship soccer club OKC Energy.
