= 2025–26 Oklahoma City Thunder season =

- Division champions
- Head coach: Mark Daigneault
- President: Sam Presti
- General manager: Sam Presti
- Owners: Professional Basketball Club LLC; Clay Bennett (chairman)
- Arena: Paycom Center

Results
- Record: 64–18 (.780)
- Place: Division: 1st (Northwest); Conference: 1st (Western)
- Playoff finish: Western Conference Finals (lost to Spurs 3–4)
- Stats at Basketball Reference

Local media
- Television: FanDuel Sports Network Oklahoma; Griffin Media/Gray Media (Note: Includes: KWTV-DT (Oklahoma City); KOTV-DT (Tulsa); KSWO-TV/KSWO-DT3 (Lawton); KSCW-DT/KWCH-DT (Wichita)) (4 regular season simulcasts)
- Radio: KWPN and WWLS-FM

The 2025–26 Oklahoma City Thunder season was the 18th season of the franchise in Oklahoma City and the 59th in the National Basketball Association (NBA). For the second time in franchise history, and the first since relocating to Oklahoma City, the Thunder entered the season as the defending NBA champions, having defeated the Indiana Pacers in seven games in the previous year's NBA Finals.

The Thunder started the season 24–1, tying the 2015–16 Golden State Warriors for the best 25-game start in NBA history. During this stretch, they set a franchise-record 16-game winning streak (surpassing their previous season's 15) and went 4–0 in 2025 NBA Cup group stage to win West Group A. In the knockout stage of the NBA Cup, they defeated the Phoenix Suns in the quarterfinals, but eventually lost to the San Antonio Spurs in the semifinals, ending their winning streak and their Cup run. After the All-Star break, the team later recorded a 12-game winning streak from February to March 2026, tying for the fourth-best in franchise history. Despite the success, forward Jalen Williams missed 49 games with a recurring hamstring injury.

The Thunder failed to improve on their 68–14 record from the previous season following a loss to the Detroit Pistons on February 25, 2026. On March 17, the Thunder clinched their third straight playoff berth following a 113–108 victory against the Orlando Magic. On March 18, the Thunder clinched their eighth Northwest Division title and their third consecutive one. On April 12, they won the Maurice Podoloff Trophy and home-court advantage throughout the entire NBA playoffs for the second straight year, and became the first team to do so, as they finished the regular season with a 64–18 record. Shai Gilgeous-Alexander won his second straight NBA Most Valuable Player Award.

In the first round, the Thunder swept the Phoenix Suns in four games, marking their third consecutive first-round sweep of the team they faced in that round. They faced the Los Angeles Lakers in the Conference Semifinals, winning the series in another four-game sweep to advance to the Western Conference Finals for the third straight time to face the San Antonio Spurs; this marked the first time in franchise history that the Thunder swept the first two rounds of the playoffs. Combined with their victory in the previous year's NBA Finals Game 7, the sweeps extended their overall postseason winning streak to nine games, which ended with a Game 1 loss to San Antonio. Despite taking a 3–2 lead and being one win away from a second consecutive Western Conference championship, injuries to Jalen Williams and breakout guard Ajay Mitchell were too much to overcome. The Thunder were ultimately eliminated by San Antonio in Game 7 of the Western Conference Finals, ending their hopes of repeating as NBA champions and making them the seventh consecutive defending NBA champion to fail to reach the NBA Finals.

== Previous season ==
The Thunder finished the 2024–25 season with a 68–14 record, placing first in the Northwest division and securing the top seed in the Western Conference for the second consecutive year. In the playoffs, the Thunder swept the Memphis Grizzlies in the first round, defeated the Denver Nuggets in seven games in the second round, and won the Western Conference Finals in five games against the Minnesota Timberwolves, advancing to the NBA Finals for the first time since the 2011–12 season. The Thunder went on to win the championship by defeating the Indiana Pacers in seven games.

== Offseason ==
=== Draft ===
Round	Pick	Player	Position	Nationality	College
1	15	Thomas Sorber	Center	United States	Georgetown
1	24	Nique Clifford	Shooting Guard	United States	Colorado State
2	44	Brooks Barnhizer	Small Forward	United States	Northwestern

The Thunder entered the draft with two first-round selections and one second-round selection, all acquired through previous trades. The team's mid-first-round pick was conveyed from the Miami Heat when Miami made the 2025 NBA playoffs which lifted its lottery protection, while the late first-round pick was obtained via a pick swap with the Los Angeles Clippers, stemming from the 2019 trade that brought Shai Gilgeous-Alexander to the Thunder. They had traded their original second-round selection to the Atlanta Hawks in 2018 and the pick was ultimately used by the Houston Rockets after triggering as a replacement to Oklahoma City's 2022 first-round pick that failed to convey due to lottery protection following the team's playoff miss that year.

== Roster ==
2025–26 Oklahoma City Thunder roster
Players

Pos.	No.	Player	Height	Weight	DOB	From
G	23	Brooks Barnhizer (TW)	6 ft 6 in (1.98 m)	227 lb (103 kg)	2002-03-02	Northwestern
C	15	Branden Carlson (TW)	7 ft 0 in (2.13 m)	236 lb (107 kg)	1999-06-14	Utah
G	9	Alex Caruso	6 ft 5 in (1.96 m)	187 lb (85 kg)	1994-02-28	Texas A&M
G	5	Luguentz Dort	6 ft 4 in (1.93 m)	222 lb (101 kg)	1999-04-19	Arizona State
G	2	Shai Gilgeous-Alexander	6 ft 6 in (1.98 m)	200 lb (91 kg)	1998-07-12	Kentucky
F/C	55	Isaiah Hartenstein	7 ft 0 in (2.13 m)	267 lb (121 kg)	1998-05-05	Germany
F/C	7	Chet Holmgren	7 ft 1 in (2.16 m)	213 lb (97 kg)	2002-05-01	Gonzaga
G	11	Isaiah Joe	6 ft 5 in (1.96 m)	178 lb (81 kg)	1999-07-02	Arkansas
G	3	Jared McCain	6 ft 3 in (1.91 m)	195 lb (88 kg)	2004-02-20	Duke
G	25	Ajay Mitchell	6 ft 4 in (1.93 m)	205 lb (93 kg)	2002-06-25	UC Santa Barbara
G/F	14	Payton Sandfort (TW)	6 ft 7 in (2.01 m)	215 lb (98 kg)	2002-07-12	Iowa
C	12	Thomas Sorber (injured)	6 ft 9 in (2.06 m)	268 lb (122 kg)	2005-12-25	Georgetown
G	44	Nikola Topić	6 ft 6 in (1.98 m)	218 lb (99 kg)	2005-08-10	Serbia
G	22	Cason Wallace	6 ft 4 in (1.93 m)	200 lb (91 kg)	2003-11-07	Kentucky
G	21	Aaron Wiggins	6 ft 6 in (1.98 m)	200 lb (91 kg)	1999-01-02	Maryland
F	8	Jalen Williams	6 ft 6 in (1.98 m)	220 lb (100 kg)	2001-04-14	Santa Clara
F	6	Jaylin Williams	6 ft 10 in (2.08 m)	241 lb (109 kg)	2002-06-29	Arkansas
G/F	34	Kenrich Williams	6 ft 7 in (2.01 m)	207 lb (94 kg)	1994-12-02	TCU

Coaches
Head coach
- Mark Daigneault
Assistant(s)
- David Akinyooye
- Dave Bliss
- Chip Engelland
- Grant Gibbs
- Connor Johnson
- Eric Maynor
- Zoe Vernon
- Mike Wilks
- Kameron Woods

Legend
- (DP) Unsigned draft pick
- (FA) Free agent
- (S) Suspended
- (GL) On assignment to G League affiliate
- (TW) Two-way affiliate player
- Injured

Roster
Updated: April 23, 2026

== Standings ==
=== Division ===
Northwest Division	W	L	PCT	GB	Home	Road	Div	GP
z – Oklahoma City Thunder	64	18	.780	–	34‍–‍8	30‍–‍10	12‍–‍4	82
x – Denver Nuggets	54	28	.659	10.0	28‍–‍13	26‍–‍15	11‍–‍5	82
x – Minnesota Timberwolves	49	33	.598	15.0	26‍–‍15	23‍–‍18	9‍–‍7	82
x – Portland Trail Blazers	42	40	.512	22.0	24‍–‍17	18‍–‍23	7‍–‍9	82
Utah Jazz	22	60	.268	42.0	14‍–‍27	8‍–‍33	1‍–‍15	82

=== Conference ===
Western Conference
#	Team	W	L	PCT	GB	GP
1	z – Oklahoma City Thunder *	64	18	.780	–	82
2	y – San Antonio Spurs *	62	20	.756	2.0	82
3	x – Denver Nuggets	54	28	.659	10.0	82
4	y – Los Angeles Lakers *	53	29	.646	11.0	82
5	x – Houston Rockets	52	30	.634	12.0	82
6	x – Minnesota Timberwolves	49	33	.598	15.0	82
7	x – Phoenix Suns	45	37	.549	19.0	82
8	x – Portland Trail Blazers	42	40	.512	22.0	82
9	pi – Los Angeles Clippers	42	40	.512	22.0	82
10	pi – Golden State Warriors	37	45	.451	27.0	82
11	New Orleans Pelicans	26	56	.317	38.0	82
12	Dallas Mavericks	26	56	.317	38.0	82
13	Memphis Grizzlies	25	57	.305	39.0	82
14	Sacramento Kings	22	60	.268	42.0	82
15	Utah Jazz	22	60	.268	42.0	82

== Game log ==
=== Preseason ===
2025 preseason game log
Total: 4–2 (Home: 2–0; Road: 2–2)
Preseason: 4–2 (home: 2–0; road: 2–2)

Game	Date	Team	Score	High points	High rebounds	High assists	Location Attendance	Record
1	October 5	@ Charlotte	W 135–114	Aaron Wiggins (23)	Malevy Leons (11)	Nikola Topić (7)	North Charleston Coliseum; 11,371	1–0
2	October 6	@ Dallas	L 89–106	Brooks Barnhizer (16)	Barnhizer, Dieng (7)	Ousmane Dieng (6)	Dickies Arena; 12,159	1–1
3	October 9	Charlotte	W 122–116	Isaiah Joe (19)	Cason Wallace (10)	Cason Wallace (8)	Paycom Center; 0	2–1
4	October 11	@ Indiana	L 101–116	Chris Youngblood (25)	Brooks Barnhizer (11)	Dieng, Mitchell, Youngblood (3)	Gainbridge Fieldhouse; 11,311	2–2
5	October 14	@ Milwaukee	W 116–112	Shai Gilgeous-Alexander (23)	Brooks Barnhizer (12)	Aaron Wiggins (7)	Fiserv Forum; 12,489	3–2
6	October 17	Denver	W 94–91	Ousmane Dieng (17)	Jaylin Williams (7)	Shai Gilgeous-Alexander (5)	Paycom Center; 0	4–2

2025–26 preseason schedule

=== Regular season ===
2025–26 game log
Total: 64–18 (Home: 34–8; Road: 30–10)
October: 6–0 (home: 3–0; road: 3–0)

Game	Date	Team	Score	High points	High rebounds	High assists	Location Attendance	Record
1	October 21	Houston	W 125–124 (2OT)	Shai Gilgeous-Alexander (35)	Isaiah Hartenstein (9)	Tied (5)	Paycom Center; 18,203	1−0
2	October 23	@ Indiana	W 141–135 (2OT)	Shai Gilgeous-Alexander (55)	Isaiah Hartenstein (14)	Shai Gilgeous-Alexander (5)	Gainbridge Fieldhouse; 17,274	2–0
3	October 25	@ Atlanta	W 117–100	Chet Holmgren (31)	Chet Holmgren (12)	Ajay Mitchell (7)	State Farm Arena; 16,450	3–0
4	October 27	@ Dallas	W 101–94	Shai Gilgeous-Alexander (23)	Isaiah Hartenstein (12)	Shai Gilgeous-Alexander (8)	American Airlines Center; 19,303	4–0
5	October 28	Sacramento	W 107–101	Shai Gilgeous-Alexander (31)	Isaiah Hartenstein (14)	Aaron Wiggins (6)	Paycom Center; 18,203	5–0
6	October 30	Washington	W 127–108	Shai Gilgeous-Alexander (31)	Jaylin Williams (9)	Shai Gilgeous-Alexander (7)	Paycom Center; 18,203	6–0

November: 14–1 (home: 7–0; road: 7–1)

Game	Date	Team	Score	High points	High rebounds	High assists	Location Attendance	Record
7	November 2	New Orleans	W 137–106	Shai Gilgeous-Alexander (30)	Isaiah Hartenstein (14)	Hartenstein, Mitchell (8)	Paycom Center; 18,203	7–0
8	November 4	@ L.A. Clippers	W 126–107	Shai Gilgeous-Alexander (30)	Isaiah Hartenstein (7)	Shai Gilgeous-Alexander (12)	Intuit Dome; 17,195	8–0
9	November 5	@ Portland	L 119–121	Shai Gilgeous-Alexander (35)	Isaiah Hartenstein (11)	Cason Wallace (5)	Moda Center; 16,822	8–1
10	November 7	@ Sacramento	W 132–101	Isaiah Hartenstein (33)	Isaiah Hartenstein (19)	Ajay Mitchell (10)	Golden 1 Center; 15,767	9–1
11	November 9	@ Memphis	W 114–100	Shai Gilgeous-Alexander (35)	Isaiah Hartenstein (13)	Shai Gilgeous-Alexander (6)	FedExForum; 14,532	10–1
12	November 11	Golden State	W 126–102	Shai Gilgeous-Alexander (28)	Chet Holmgren (11)	Shai Gilgeous-Alexander (11)	Paycom Center; 18,203	11–1
13	November 12	L.A. Lakers	W 121–92	Shai Gilgeous-Alexander (30)	Isaiah Hartenstein (8)	Shai Gilgeous-Alexander (9)	Paycom Center; 18,203	12–1
14	November 15	@ Charlotte	W 109–96	Shai Gilgeous-Alexander (33)	Isaiah Hartenstein (11)	Shai Gilgeous-Alexander (7)	Spectrum Center; 19,469	13–1
15	November 17	@ New Orleans	W 126–109	Chet Holmgren (26)	Chet Holmgren (9)	Shai Gilgeous-Alexander (8)	Smoothie King Center; 13,757	14–1
16	November 19	Sacramento	W 113–99	Shai Gilgeous-Alexander (33)	Isaiah Hartenstein (12)	Ajay Mitchell (6)	Paycom Center; 18,203	15–1
17	November 21	@ Utah	W 144–112	Shai Gilgeous-Alexander (31)	Hartenstein, Jay. Williams (6)	Shai Gilgeous-Alexander (8)	Delta Center; 18,186	16–1
18	November 23	Portland	W 122–95	Shai Gilgeous-Alexander (37)	Isaiah Hartenstein (15)	Shai Gilgeous-Alexander (7)	Paycom Center; 18,203	17–1
19	November 26	Minnesota	W 113–105	Shai Gilgeous-Alexander (40)	Isaiah Hartenstein (7)	Shai Gilgeous-Alexander (6)	Paycom Center; 18,203	18–1
20	November 28	Phoenix	W 123–119	Shai Gilgeous-Alexander (37)	Chet Holmgren (8)	Gilgeous-Alexander, Jal. Williams (8)	Paycom Center; 18,203	19–1
21	November 30	@ Portland	W 123–115	Shai Gilgeous-Alexander (26)	Chet Holmgren (9)	Gilgeous-Alexander, Mitchell, Jal. Williams (5)	Moda Center; 17,597	20–1

December: 8–4 (home: 6–2; road: 2–2)

Game	Date	Team	Score	High points	High rebounds	High assists	Location Attendance	Record
22	December 2	@ Golden State	W 124–112	Shai Gilgeous-Alexander (38)	Jaylen Williams (9)	Jalen Williams (6)	Chase Center; 18,064	21–1
23	December 5	Dallas	W 132–111	Shai Gilgeous-Alexander (33)	Holmgren, Jal. Williams (8)	Shai Gilgeous-Alexander (6)	Paycom Center; 18,203	22–1
24	December 7	@ Utah	W 131–101	Holmgren, Jal. Williams (25)	Chet Holmgren (9)	Jalen Williams (8)	Delta Center; 18,186	23–1
25	December 10	Phoenix	W 138–89	Shai Gilgeous-Alexander (28)	Chet Holmgren (8)	Shai Gilgeous-Alexander (8)	Paycom Center; 18,203	24–1
26	December 13	San Antonio	L 109–111	Shai Gilgeous-Alexander (29)	Caruso, Hartenstein (8)	Shai Gilgeous-Alexander (5)	T-Mobile Arena; 18,519	24–2
27	December 17	L.A. Clippers	W 122–101	Shai Gilgeous-Alexander (32)	Tied (7)	Shai Gilgeous-Alexander (6)	Paycom Center; 18,203	25–2
28	December 19	@ Minnesota	L 107–112	Shai Gilgeous-Alexander (35)	Alex Caruso (12)	Shai Gilgeous-Alexander (7)	Target Center; 18,978	25–3
29	December 22	Memphis	W 119–103	Shai Gilgeous-Alexander (31)	Shai Gilgeous-Alexander (10)	Shai Gilgeous-Alexander (8)	Paycom Center; 18,203	26–3
30	December 23	@ San Antonio	L 110–130	Shai Gilgeous-Alexander (33)	Isaiah Hartenstein (12)	Gilgeous-Alexander, Jal. Williams (8)	Frost Bank Center; 19,133	26–4
31	December 25	San Antonio	L 102–117	Shai Gilgeous-Alexander (22)	Hartenstein, Holmgren (12)	Jalen Williams (6)	Paycom Center; 18,203	26–5
32	December 28	Philadelphia	W 129–104	Chet Holmgren (29)	Chet Holmgren (9)	Jalen Williams (6)	Paycom Center; 18,203	27–5
33	December 29	Atlanta	W 140–129	Shai Gilgeous-Alexander (39)	Tied (9)	Jalen Williams (7)	Paycom Center; 18,203	28–5
34	December 31	Portland	W 124–95	Shai Gilgeous-Alexander (30)	Chet Holmgren (10)	Jalen Williams (7)	Paycom Center; 18,203	29–5

January: 9–6 (home: 4–3; road: 5–3)

Game	Date	Team	Score	High points	High rebounds	High assists	Location Attendance	Record
35	January 2	@ Golden State	W 131–94	Shai Gilgeous-Alexander (30)	Chet Holmgren (15)	Shai Gilgeous-Alexander (7)	Chase Center; 18,064	30–5
36	January 4	@ Phoenix	L 105–108	Shai Gilgeous-Alexander (25)	Chet Holmgren (9)	Jalen Williams (7)	Mortgage Matchup Center; 17,071	30–6
37	January 5	Charlotte	L 97–124	Shai Gilgeous-Alexander (21)	Chet Holmgren (6)	Shai Gilgeous-Alexander (6)	Paycom Center; 18,203	30–7
38	January 7	Utah	W 129–125 (OT)	Shai Gilgeous-Alexander (46)	Chet Holmgren (12)	Jalen Williams (8)	Paycom Center; 18,203	31–7
39	January 9	@ Memphis	W 117–116	Jalen Williams (26)	Kenrich Williams (8)	Jalen Williams (10)	FedExForum; 15,717	32–7
40	January 11	Miami	W 124–112	Shai Gilgeous-Alexander (29)	Chet Holmgren (10)	Shai Gilgeous-Alexander (8)	Paycom Center; 18,203	33–7
41	January 13	San Antonio	W 119–98	Shai Gilgeous-Alexander (34)	Holmgren, Jay. Williams (10)	Gilgeous-Alexander, Jay. Williams (5)	Paycom Center; 18,203	34–7
42	January 15	@ Houston	W 111–91	Shai Gilgeous-Alexander (20)	Chet Holmgren (9)	Jalen Williams (10)	Toyota Center; 18,055	35–7
43	January 17	@ Miami	L 120–122	Shai Gilgeous-Alexander (39)	Chet Holmgren (11)	Jaylin Williams (4)	Kaseya Center; 19,704	35–8
44	January 19	@ Cleveland	W 136–104	Shai Gilgeous-Alexander (30)	Chet Holmgren (8)	Ajay Mitchell (9)	Rocket Arena; 19,432	36–8
45	January 21	@ Milwaukee	W 122–102	Shai Gilgeous-Alexander (40)	Kenrich Williams (8)	Shai Gilgeous-Alexander (11)	Fiserv Forum; 16,594	37–8
46	January 23	Indiana	L 114–117	Shai Gilgeous-Alexander (47)	Chet Holmgren (13)	Gilgeous-Alexander, K. Williams (4)	Paycom Center; 18,203	37–9
47	January 25	Toronto	L 101–103	Shai Gilgeous-Alexander (24)	Chet Holmgren (10)	Shai Gilgeous-Alexander (6)	Paycom Center; 18,203	37–10
48	January 27	New Orleans	W 104–95	Shai Gilgeous-Alexander (29)	Chet Holmgren (14)	Jaylin Williams (5)	Paycom Center; 18,203	38–10
49	January 29	@ Minnesota	L 111–123	Shai Gilgeous-Alexander (30)	Shai Gilgeous-Alexander (6)	Shai Gilgeous-Alexander (8)	Target Center; 18,012	38–11

February: 8–4 (home: 4–2; road: 4–2)

Game	Date	Team	Score	High points	High rebounds	High assists	Location Attendance	Record
50	February 1	@ Denver	W 121–111	Shai Gilgeous-Alexander (34)	Wallace, Wiggins (6)	Shai Gilgeous-Alexander (13)	Ball Arena; 19,900	39–11
51	February 3	Orlando	W 128–92	Isaiah Joe (22)	Hartenstein, Holmgren (10)	Isaiah Hartenstein (10)	Paycom Center; 18,203	40–11
52	February 4	@ San Antonio	L 106–116	Kenrich Williams (25)	Jaylin Williams (12)	Aaron Wiggins (6)	Frost Bank Center; 18,354	40–12
53	February 7	Houston	L 106–112	Cason Wallace (23)	Chet Holmgren (14)	Isaiah Hartenstein (11)	Paycom Center; 18,203	40–13
54	February 9	@ L.A. Lakers	W 119–110	Jalen Williams (23)	Chet Holmgren (10)	Hartenstein, Wallace (6)	Crypto.com Arena; 18,519	41–13
55	February 11	@ Phoenix	W 136–109	Jalen Williams (28)	Jay. Williams, K. Williams (6)	Isaiah Hartenstein (6)	Mortgage Matchup Center; 17,071	42–13
56	February 12	Milwaukee	L 93–110	Isaiah Joe (17)	Chet Holmgren (13)	Chet Holmgren (4)	Paycom Center; 18,203	42–14
All-Star Game
57	February 20	Brooklyn	W 105–86	Jared McCain (21)	Isaiah Hartenstein (8)	Cason Wallace (6)	Paycom Center; 18,203	43–14
58	February 22	Cleveland	W 121–113	Isaiah Joe (22)	Chet Holmgren (15)	Cason Wallace (10)	Paycom Center; 18,203	44–14
59	February 24	@ Toronto	W 116–107	Cason Wallace (27)	Hartenstein, Holmgren (9)	Cason Wallace (7)	Scotiabank Arena; 19,153	45–14
60	February 25	@ Detroit	L 116–124	Jaylin Williams (30)	Jaylin Williams (11)	Aaron Wiggins (6)	Little Caesars Arena; 20,062	45–15
61	February 27	Denver	W 127–121 (OT)	Shai Gilgeous-Alexander (36)	Chet Holmgren (21)	Shai Gilgeous-Alexander (9)	Paycom Center; 18,203	46–15

March: 13–1 (home: 6–0; road: 7–1)

Game	Date	Team	Score	High points	High rebounds	High assists	Location Attendance	Record
62	March 1	@ Dallas	W 100–87	Shai Gilgeous-Alexander (30)	Chet Holmgren (9)	Cason Wallace (8)	American Airlines Center; 18,900	47–15
63	March 3	@ Chicago	W 116–108	Jared McCain (20)	Jaylin Williams (16)	Jaylin Williams (6)	United Center; 18,561	48–15
64	March 4	@ New York	W 103–100	Chet Holmgren (28)	Chet Holmgren (8)	Shai Gilgeous-Alexander (8)	Madison Square Garden; 19,812	49–15
65	March 7	Golden State	W 104–97	Shai Gilgeous-Alexander (27)	Jaylin Williams (14)	Shai Gilgeous-Alexander (5)	Paycom Center; 18,203	50–15
66	March 9	Denver	W 129–126	Shai Gilgeous-Alexander (35)	Jaylin Williams (12)	Shai Gilgeous-Alexander (15)	Paycom Center; 18,203	51–15
67	March 12	Boston	W 104–102	Shai Gilgeous-Alexander (35)	Chet Holmgren (9)	Shai Gilgeous-Alexander (9)	Paycom Center; 18,203	52–15
68	March 15	Minnesota	W 116–103	Chet Holmgren (21)	Isaiah Hartenstein (12)	Shai Gilgeous-Alexander (10)	Paycom Center; 18,203	53–15
69	March 17	@ Orlando	W 113–108	Shai Gilegous-Alexander (40)	Chet Holmgren (12)	Isaiah Hartenstein (8)	Kia Center; 18,846	54–15
70	March 18	@ Brooklyn	W 121–92	Jared McCain (26)	Tied (7)	Shai Gilgeous-Alexander (6)	Barclays Center; 17,548	55–15
71	March 21	@ Washington	W 132–111	Shai Gilgeous-Alexander (40)	Isaiah Hartenstein (20)	Isaiah Hartenstein (10)	Capital One Arena; 20,028	56–15
72	March 23	@ Philadelphia	W 123–103	Shai Gilgeous-Alexander (22)	Isaiah Hartenstein (12)	Jalen Williams (6)	Xfinity Mobile Arena; 19,746	57–15
73	March 25	@ Boston	L 109–119	Shai Gilgeous-Alexander (33)	Tied (5)	Shai-Gilgeous-Alexander (8)	TD Garden; 19,156	57–16
74	March 27	Chicago	W 131–113	Shai Gilgeous-Alexander (25)	Isaiah Hartenstein (16)	Jalen Williams (8)	Paycom Center; 18,203	58–16
75	March 29	New York	W 111–100	Shai Gilgeous-Alexander (30)	Isaiah Hartenstein (13)	Ajay Mitchell (5)	Paycom Center; 18,203	59–16
76	March 30	Detroit	W 114–110 (OT)	Shai Gilgeous-Alexander (47)	Jaylin Williams (13)	Alex Caruso (4)	Paycom Center; 18,203	60–16

April: 4–2 (home: 2–1; road: 2–1)

Game	Date	Team	Score	High points	High rebounds	High assists	Location Attendance	Record
77	April 2	L.A. Lakers	W 139–96	Shai Gilgeous-Alexander (28)	Jalen Williams (9)	Jalen Williams (8)	Paycom Center; 18,203	61–16
78	April 5	Utah	W 146–111	Chet Holmgren (21)	Isaiah Hartenstein (8)	Tied (7)	Paycom Center; 18,203	62–16
79	April 7	@ L.A. Lakers	W 123–87	Shai Gilgeous-Alexander (25)	Chet Holmgren (10)	Shai Gilgeous-Alexander (8)	Crypto.com Arena; 18,997	63–16
80	April 8	@ L.A. Clippers	W 128–110	Chet Holmgren (30)	Chet Holmgren (14)	Shai Gilgeous-Alexander (11)	Intuit Dome; 17,927	64–16
81	April 10	@ Denver	L 107–127	Branden Carlson (23)	Carlson, K. Williams (12)	Nikola Topić (11)	Ball Arena; 20,014	64–17
82	April 12	Phoenix	L 103–135	Branden Carlson (26)	Branden Carlson (10)	Nikola Topić (14)	Paycom Center; 18,203	64–18

2025–26 season schedule

=== Playoffs ===
2026 playoff game log
Total: 11–4 (home: 6–2; road: 5–2)
First Round: 4–0 (home: 2–0; road: 2–0)

Game	Date	Team	Score	High points	High rebounds	High assists	Location Attendance	Series
1	April 19	Phoenix	W 119–84	Shai Gilgeous-Alexander (25)	Isaiah Hartenstein (8)	Shai Gilgeous-Alexander (7)	Paycom Center; 18,203	1–0
2	April 22	Phoenix	W 120–107	Shai Gilgeous-Alexander (37)	Isaiah Hartenstein (10)	Shai Gilgeous-Alexander (9)	Paycom Center; 18,203	2–0
3	April 25	@ Phoenix	W 121–107	Shai Gilgeous-Alexander (42)	Chet Holmgren (7)	Shai Gilgeous-Alexander (8)	Mortgage Matchup Center; 17,071	3–0
4	April 27	@ Phoenix	W 131–122	Shai Gilgeous-Alexander (31)	Hartenstein, Holmgren (12)	Shai Gilgeous-Alexander (8)	Mortgage Matchup Center; 17,071	4–0

Conference Semifinals: 4–0 (home: 2–0; road: 2–0)

Game	Date	Team	Score	High points	High rebounds	High assists	Location Attendance	Series
1	May 5	L.A. Lakers	W 108–90	Chet Holmgren (24)	Chet Holmgren (12)	Shai Gilgeous-Alexander (6)	Paycom Center; 18,203	1–0
2	May 7	L.A. Lakers	W 125–107	Holmgren, Gilgeous-Alexander (22)	Holmgren, Hartenstein (9)	Ajay Mitchell (6)	Paycom Center; 18,203	2–0
3	May 9	@ L.A. Lakers	W 131–108	Ajay Mitchell (24)	Holmgren, Hartenstein (9)	Ajay Mitchell (10)	Crypto.com Arena; 19,057	3–0
4	May 11	@ L.A. Lakers	W 115–110	Shai Gilgeous-Alexander (35)	Isaiah Hartenstein (10)	Shai Gilgeous-Alexander (8)	Crypto.com Arena; 19,057	4–0

Conference Finals: 3–4 (home: 2–2; road: 1–2)

Game	Date	Team	Score	High points	High rebounds	High assists	Location Attendance	Series
1	May 18	San Antonio	L 115–122 (2OT)	Alex Caruso (31)	Chet Holmgren (8)	Shai Gilgeous-Alexander (12)	Paycom Center; 18,203	0–1
2	May 20	San Antonio	W 122–113	Shai Gilgeous-Alexander (30)	Isaiah Hartenstein (13)	Shai Gilgeous-Alexander (9)	Paycom Center; 18,203	1–1
3	May 22	@ San Antonio	W 123–108	Shai Gilgeous-Alexander (26)	Isaiah Hartenstein (8)	Shai Gilgeous-Alexander (12)	Frost Bank Center; 19,034	2–1
4	May 24	@ San Antonio	L 82–103	Shai Gilgeous-Alexander (19)	Chet Holmgren (9)	Shai Gilgeous-Alexander (7)	Frost Bank Center; 19,405	2–2
5	May 26	San Antonio	W 127–114	Shai Gilgeous-Alexander (32)	Isaiah Hartenstein (15)	Shai Gilgeous-Alexander (9)	Paycom Center; 18,203	3–2
6	May 28	@ San Antonio	L 91–118	Shai Gilgeous-Alexander (15)	Chet Holmgren (11)	Jared McCain (6)	Frost Bank Center; 19,066	3–3
7	May 30	San Antonio	L 103–111	Shai Gilgeous-Alexander (35)	Jaylin Williams (10)	Shai Gilgeous-Alexander (9)	Paycom Center; 18,203	3–4

2026 playoff schedule

=== NBA Cup ===
The groups were revealed during the tournament announcement on July 9, 2025

==== West Group A ====
Pos	Team	Pld	W	L	PF	PA	PD	Qualification
1	Oklahoma City Thunder	4	4	0	512	437	+75	Advanced to knockout rounds
2	Phoenix Suns	4	3	1	463	432	+31	Advanced to knockout rounds
3	Minnesota Timberwolves	4	2	2	479	434	+45	
4	Utah Jazz	4	1	3	433	518	−85	
5	Sacramento Kings	4	0	4	430	496	−66	

Source: NBA

== Injuries ==
Player	Duration		Injury	Games missed
Player	Start	End	Injury	Games missed
Thomas Sorber	September 4, 2025	2026-2027 NBA Season	Torn Right ACL Surgery	82 (+15) (Note: Sorber missed 15 playoff games)
Kenrich Williams	September 29, 2025	November 25, 2025	Arthroscopic Left Knee Surgery	18
Nikola Topić	October 6, 2025	February 8, 2026	Testicular Surgery	54
Isaiah Joe	October 20, 2025	October 30, 2025	Left Knee Contusion	5
Jalen Williams	October 20, 2025	November 27, 2025	Right Wrist Surgical Recovery	19
Alex Caruso	October 22, 2025	October 28, 2025	Concussion Protocol	3
Cason Wallace	October 23, 2025	October 25, 2025	Left Knee Sprain	1
Chet Holmgren	October 28, 2025	November 4, 2025	Left Back Soreness	4
Luguentz Dort	November 5, 2025	November 15, 2025	Right Upper Trap Strain	5
Chet Holmgren	November 5, 2025	November 7, 2025	Low Back Sprain	1
Aaron Wiggins	November 7, 2025	December 13,2025	Left Adductor Strain	16
Jaylin Williams	November 15, 2025	November 17, 2025	Left Shoulder Soreness	1
Isaiah Hartenstein	November 28, 2025	December 13, 2025	Right Soleus Strain	6
Alex Caruso	November 30, 2025	December 10, 2025	Right Quad Soreness	4
Luguentz Dort	December 2, 2025	December 10, 2025	Right Adductor Strain	2
Isaiah Joe	December 5, 2025	December 17, 2025	Left Knee Soreness	4
Shai Gilgeous-Alexander	December 7, 2025	December 10, 2025	Left Elbow Bursitis	1
Isaiah Hartenstein	December 17, 2025	December 19,2025	Right Soleus Injury Management	1
Jaylin Williams	December 17, 2025	January 17, 2026	Right Heel Bursitis	11
Aaron Wiggins	December 19, 2025	December 23, 2025	Right Adductor Soreness	2
Alex Caruso	December 22, 2025	December 23, 2025	Right Middle Finger Soreness	1
Ousmane Dieng	December 22, 2025	January 10, 2026	Right Calf Strain	11
Ajay Mitchell	December 23, 2025	December 27, 2025	Concussion Protocol	2
Isaiah Hartenstein	December 29, 2025	January 29, 2026	Right Soleus Strain	16
Alex Caruso	January 5, 2026	January 9, 2026	Lower Back Soreness	2
Chet Holmgren	January 8, 2026	January 10, 2026	Bilateral Shins Soreness	1
Cason Wallace	January 8, 2026	January 10, 2026	Left Great Toe Soreness	1
Luguentz Dort	January 13, 2026	January 15, 2026	Left Foot Soreness	1
Jalen Williams	January 18, 2026	February 8, 2026	Right Hamstring Strain	29
Alex Caruso	January 19, 2026	February 3, 2026	Right Adductor Strain	6
Jaylin Williams	January 21, 2026	January 23, 2026	Left Gut Contusion	1
Ajay Mitchell	January 22, 2026	March 9, 2026	Abdominal Strain	20
Aaron Wiggins	January 23, 2026	January 25, 2026	Right Groin Soreness	1
Cason Wallace	January 27, 2026	January 29, 2026	Left Hip Soreness	1
Alex Caruso	February 4, 2026	February 6, 2026	Right Adductor Injury Management	1
Luguentz Dort	February 4, 2026	February 6, 2026	Right Patellofemoral Joint Inflammation	1
Shai Gilgeous-Alexander	February 4, 2026	February 27, 2026	Abdominal Strain	8
Isaiah Hartenstein	February 4, 2026	February 6, 2026	Right Eye Corneal Abrasion	1
Chet Holmgren	February 4, 2026	February 6, 2026	Low Back Spasms	1
Branden Carlson	February 12, 2026	February 19, 2026	Low Back Spasms	1
Isaiah Hartenstein	February 12, 2026	February 19, 2026	Right Soleus Injury Management	1
Jalen Williams	February 12, 2026	March 23, 2026	Right Hamstring Strain	16
Alex Caruso	February 21, 2026	February 24, 2026	Left Ankle Sprain	1
Shai Gilgeous-Alexander	March 3, 2026	March 4, 2026	Abdominal Strain Injury Management	1
Isaiah Hartenstein	March 3, 2026	March 4, 2026	Right Soleus Injury Management	1
Alex Caruso	March 7, 2026	March 12, 2026	Left Hip Contusion	2
Isaiah Hartenstein	March 7, 2026	March 15, 2026	Left Calf Contusion	3
Chet Holmgren	March 7, 2026	March 12, 2026	Flu	2
Isaiah Hartenstein	March 18, 2026	March 20, 2026	Left Soleus Injury Management	1
Luguentz Dort	March 21,2026	March 22, 2026	Left Knee Contusion	1
Chet Holmgren	March 27, 2026	March 28, 2026	Right Hip Contusion	1
Isaiah Hartenstein	March 30, 2026	April 1, 2026	Left Soleus Injury Management	1
Jalen Williams	March 30, 2026	April 1, 2026	Right Hamstring Injury Management	1
Alex Caruso	April 2, 2026	April 4, 2026	Illness	1
Jalen Williams	April 6, 2026	April 8, 2026	Right Hamstring Injury Management	1
Shai Gilgeous-Alexander	April 9, 2026	April 13, 2026	Right Oblique Injury Management	2
Isaiah Hartenstein	April 9, 2026	April 13, 202	Left Soleus Injury Management	2
Chet Holmgren	April 9, 2026	April 13, 2026	Low Back Spasms	2
Isaiah Joe	April 9, 2026	April 13, 2026	Left Knee Soreness	2
Ajay Mitchell	April 9, 2026	April 13, 2026	Left Ankle Injury Management	2
Cason Wallace	April 9, 2026	April 13, 2026	Left Great Toe Soreness	2
Jalen Williams	April 9, 2026	April 13, 2026	Right Hamstring Injury Management	2
Jaylin Williams	April 9, 2026	April 13, 2026	Right Achilles Tendinitis	2
Jalen Williams	April 23, 2026	May 17, 2026	Left Hamstring Strain	6

== Player statistics ==
Legend
GP	Games played	GS	Games started	MPG	Minutes per game
FG%	Field goal percentage	3P%	3-point field goal percentage	FT%	Free throw percentage
RPG	Rebounds per game	APG	Assists per game	SPG	Steals per game
BPG	Blocks per game	PPG	Points per game	**Bold**	Career high

Sabremetrics
TS%	True shooting percentage	eFG%	Effective field goal percentage	ORB%	Offensive rebound percentage
DRB%	Defensive rebound percentage	TRB%	Total rebound percentage	AST%	Assist percentage
STL%	Steal percentage	BLK%	Block percentage	TOV%	Turnover percentage
USG%	Usage percentage	ORtg	Offensive rating	DRtg	Defensive rating
PER	Player efficiency rating

=== Preseason ===
Player	GP	GS	MPG	FG%	3P%	FT%	RPG	APG	SPG	BPG	PPG
Zack Austin ^{T}	4	0	17.1	35.3%	28.6%	100%	2.0	0.0	1.3	1.0	5.0
Brooks Barnhizer	6	2	29.8	43.6%	41.7%	72.0%	6.7	1.8	2.0	0.2	9.5
Branden Carlson	3	0	16.7	42.9%	33.3%	72.7%	5.7	1.0	0.3	0.0	10.3
Alex Caruso	3	3	15.3	52.9%	30.0%	100%	0.7	1.0	0.3	0.3	7.7
Ousmane Dieng	6	3	26.0	33.8%	27.0%	76.9%	5.2	3.2	1.2	0.3	10.7
Luguentz Dort	3	3	18.4	40.9%	33.3%	100%	3.0	1.0	1.0	0.0	8.0
Shai Gilgeous-Alexander	3	3	19.0	83.3%	71.4%	75.0%	2.3	5.3	1.7	0.7	17.0
Jazian Gortman ^{T}	4	0	16.2	50.0%	33.3%	100%	1.8	2.0	0.8	0.0	9.8
Isaiah Hartenstein	3	3	18.7	50.0%	30.0%	66.7%	4.7	2.0	0.3	1.0	9.0
Chet Holmgren	1	1	19.4	37.5%	25.0%	100%	6.0	3.0	1.0	1.0	9.0
Isaiah Joe	4	2	17.0	39.1%	36.8%	88.9%	3.0	1.5	0.8	0.3	8.3
Malevy Leons ^{T}	6	0	19.6	48.4%	57.1%	88.9%	4.5	0.7	1.3	0.7	7.7
Ajay Mitchell	1	1	15.1	75.0%	0.0%	80.0%	1.0	3.0	2.0	1.0	16.0
Nikola Topić	1	1	31.5	44.4%	0.0%	100%	4.0	7.0	1.0	0.0	10.0
Cason Wallace	5	4	22.0	31.3%	21.7%	83.3%	4.8	4.4	1.8	0.4	8.0
Aaron Wiggins	5	2	23.8	38.2%	25.0%	83.3%	3.6	4.2	0.8	0.6	10.4
Jaylin Williams	4	2	23.0	47.2%	42.3%	0.0%	4.3	1.8	0.3	2.0	11.3
Chris Youngblood	6	0	22.7	38.5%	33.3%	77.8%	2.8	1.3	0.7	0.2	11.3

Led team in statistic

Source: RealGM
^{T} Waived/Traded after preseason

=== Regular season ===
Player	GP	GS	MPG	FG%	3P%	FT%	RPG	APG	SPG	BPG	PPG
Brooks Barnhizer	40	0	8.7	38.0%	29.2%	70.0%	2.0	0.6	0.3	0.1	1.7
Buddy Boeheim ^{‡}	4	0	3.8	33.3%	33.3%	–	0.0	0.0	0.0	0.0	1.5
Branden Carlson	42	4	11.6	52.7%	36.0%	57.7%	3.0	0.7	0.2	0.6	5.8
Alex Caruso	56	0	18.2	42.3%	29.3%	80.4%	2.8	2.0	1.3	0.3	6.2
Ousmane Dieng ^{†}	27	0	10.9	41.8%	36.7%	100%	1.6	1.0	0.1	0.3	3.7
Luguentz Dort	69	69	26.8	38.5%	34.4%	75.9%	3.6	1.2	0.9	0.4	8.3
Shai Gilgeous-Alexander	68	68	33.2	55.3%	38.6%	87.9%	4.3	6.6	1.4	0.8	31.1
Isaiah Hartenstein	47	46	24.2	62.2%	0.0%	61.0%	9.4	3.5	1.0	0.8	9.2
Chet Holmgren	69	69	28.9	55.7%	36.2%	79.2%	8.9	1.7	0.6	1.9	17.1
Isaiah Joe	71	9	21.2	45.5%	42.3%	89.4%	2.5	1.3	0.7	0.2	11.1
Jared McCain ^{≠}	30	2	18.0	46.2%	39.1%	85.3%	2.1	0.9	0.4	0.1	10.4
Ajay Mitchell	57	16	25.8	48.5%	34.7%	87.0%	3.3	3.6	1.2	0.3	13.6
Payton Sandfort	4	0	15.8	50.0%	41.2%	50.0%	2.5	0.0	0.3	0.0	8.8
Nikola Topić	10	2	16.0	43.1%	40.0%	40.0%	1.9	4.4	0.5	0.0	5.2
Cason Wallace	77	58	26.6	43.2%	35.1%	80.9%	3.1	2.6	1.9	0.4	8.6
Aaron Wiggins	65	21	21.8	43.1%	35.6%	73.6%	3.1	1.7	0.9	0.4	9.4
Jalen Williams	33	33	28.4	48.4%	29.9%	83.7%	4.6	5.5	1.2	0.3	17.1
Jaylin Williams	65	11	19.6	42.3%	38.3%	79.3%	5.5	2.4	0.5	0.6	7.2
Kenrich Williams	56	2	15.3	47.3%	38.8%	63.5%	3.3	1.4	0.6	0.1	6.5
Chris Youngblood ^{‡}	32	0	5.4	33.3%	31.4%	90.0%	0.9	0.3	0.1	0.1	2.0

Led team in statistic

Source: Basketball-Reference
^{‡} Waived during the season
^{†} Traded during the season
^{≠} Acquired during the season

=== Playoffs ===
Player	GP	GS	MPG	FG%	3P%	FT%	RPG	APG	SPG	BPG	PPG
Alex Caruso	15	0	23.5	47.8%	44.6%	81.5%	3.0	2.1	1.4	0.5	11.0
Luguentz Dort	15	15	22.3	36.6%	30.8%	50.0%	2.7	1.3	0.5	0.1	5.5
Shai Gilgeous-Alexander	15	15	36.3	46.3%	30.5%	89.2%	2.9	7.9	1.3	0.9	27.6
Isaiah Hartenstein	15	15	23.3	63.3%	0.0%	76.7%	8.3	2.6	0.8	0.7	9.1
Chet Holmgren	15	15	30.6	56.8%	35.7%	82.7%	8.2	1.1	1.1	1.5	14.9
Isaiah Joe	13	0	11.0	41.8%	34.8%	100%	1.4	1.1	0.5	0.1	4.8
Jared McCain	15	2	17.2	41.2%	37.1%	80.0%	1.9	1.0	0.3	0.0	10.0
Ajay Mitchell	11	7	28.8	46.0%	32.5%	90.0%	3.7	4.3	1.5	0.1	15.1
Nikola Topić	9	0	2.4	33.3%	0.0%	—	0.2	0.3	0.2	0.0	0.4
Cason Wallace	15	2	24.9	47.9%	48.4%	87.5%	3.8	2.4	2.1	0.5	8.6
Aaron Wiggins	13	0	5.8	36.0%	11.1%	—	0.4	0.4	0.1	0.1	1.5
Jalen Williams	5	4	21.4	51.8%	41.7%	75.0%	3.2	2.8	1.0	0.4	14.4
Jaylin Williams	15	0	16.0	40.0%	36.0%	66.7%	4.1	1.5	0.5	0.2	4.9
Kenrich Williams	11	0	6.5	38.7%	31.6%	100%	1.8	0.5	0.1	0.0	3.1

Led team in statistic

=== Individual game highs ===
Category	Player	Statistic
Points	Shai Gilgeous-Alexander	55 vs Pacers on October 23, 2025
Rebounds	Chet Holmgren	21 vs Nuggets on February 27, 2026
Assists	Shai Gilgeous-Alexander	15 vs Nuggets on March 9, 2026
Steals	Cason Wallace; Alex Caruso; Cason Wallace; Cason Wallace; Aaron Wiggins; Kenrich Williams	5 vs Pelicans on November 2, 2025; 5 vs Warriors on November 11, 2025; 5 vs Jazz on December 7, 2025; 5 vs Clippers on December 18, 2025; 5 vs Spurs on February 4, 2026; 5 vs Nets on March 18, 2026
Blocks	Chet Holmgren	6 vs Trail Blazers on December 31, 2025

== Transactions ==
=== Trades ===
Date	Trade		Ref.
June 25, 2025	To Sacramento Kings: Draft rights to Nique Clifford (No. 24)	To Oklahoma City Thunder: 2027 protected first-round pick (from San Antonio) (Note: Oklahoma City will receive the pick if it's No. 17–30, otherwise they receive two 2027 second-round picks.)	
June 28, 2025	To Oklahoma City Thunder: Colby Jones	To Washington Wizards: Dillon Jones; 2029 second-round pick (from Houston)	
February 4, 2026	To Charlotte Hornets: Ousmane Dieng (Note: Oklahoma City traded Ousmane Dieng to Charlotte, which then flipped him to Chicago. This was originally reported to be a three-team trade but was made official as two separate trades.); 2029 second-round pick (Note: The more favorable of the picks originally belonging to Atlanta and Miami.)	To Oklahoma City Thunder: Mason Plumlee	
February 4, 2026	To Philadelphia 76ers: 2026 first-round pick (from Houston); 2027 second-round pick (Note: The most favorable of the picks originally belonging to Houston, Indiana, Miami, and Oklahoma City.); 2028 second-round pick (from Milwaukee); 2028 second-round pick (from Oklahoma City)	To Oklahoma City Thunder: Jared McCain	
February 4, 2026	To Oklahoma City Thunder: Draft rights to Balša Koprivica (2021 No. 57)	To Utah Jazz: Cash considerations	

=== Free agency ===
==== Re-signings ====
Date	Player	Contract
June 29, 2025	Jaylin Williams	Multi-Year
June 29, 2025	Ajay Mitchell	Multi-Year
July 8, 2025	Branden Carlson	Two-Way Contract

==== Subtractions ====
Date	Player	Reason	New team
June 28, 2025	Colby Jones	Waived	Detroit Pistons
July 3, 2025	Adam Flagler	Free Agent	San Antonio Spurs
July 8, 2025	Alex Ducas	Free Agent	(Australia) Brisbane Bullets
