= Jaylin Williams (basketball, born 2002) =

American basketball player (born 2002)

No. 6 – Oklahoma City Thunder
- Position: Power forward
- League: NBA

Personal information
- Born: June 29, 2002 (age 24) Fort Smith, Arkansas, U.S.
- Listed height: 6 ft 9 in (2.06 m)
- Listed weight: 240 lb (109 kg)

Career information
- High school: Northside (Fort Smith, Arkansas)
- College: Arkansas (2020–2022)
- NBA draft: 2022: 2nd round, 34th overall pick
- Drafted by: Oklahoma City Thunder
- Playing career: 2022–present

Career history
- 2022–present: Oklahoma City Thunder
- 2022: →Oklahoma City Blue

Career highlights
- NBA champion (2025); First-team All-SEC – Coaches (2022); Second-team All-SEC – AP (2022); SEC All-Defensive Team (2022); Mr. Basketball of Arkansas (2020)
- Stats at NBA.com
- Stats at Basketball Reference

Jaylin Michael Williams (born June 29, 2002), nicknamed J-Will, is an American professional basketball player for the Oklahoma City Thunder of the National Basketball Association (NBA). He played college basketball for the Arkansas Razorbacks. A power forward / center, he was selected by the Thunder in the second round of the 2022 NBA draft. He is the first-ever NBA player of Vietnamese descent and also the first champion, having been a member of the Thunder's 2025 NBA championship team.

== Early life and family ==
Jaylin Williams was born June 29, 2002 and grew up in Fort Smith, Arkansas. Williams's parents are Michael and Linda Williams. Michael Williams was a high school basketball star in Fort Smith, Arkansas. He is African-American. Linda Williams was born in Saigon (now Ho Chi Minh City), South Vietnam and moved to the United States in 1975 after the Vietnam War.A teacher, Linda Williams grew up in Hammond, Indiana.

== High school career ==
Williams played basketball for Northside High School in Fort Smith, Arkansas, where he played with his future NBA teammate, Isaiah Joe. As a sophomore, he helped his team reach the Class 7A state final. In his junior season, Williams averaged 16 points, 11 rebounds and three blocks per game, and was named Arkansas Division I Player of the Year by the Northwest Arkansas Democrat-Gazette. He led his team to the Class 6A state title and was named tournament MVP after recording 20 points and 16 rebounds in the title game. As a senior, Williams averaged 18.7 points, 12.2 rebounds, 2.7 assists and 2.5 blocks per game, earning Arkansas Gatorade Player of the Year honors and repeating as Arkansas Division I Player of the Year. A consensus four-star recruit, he committed to playing college basketball for the University of Arkansas over an offer from Auburn, among other programs.

== College career ==
As a freshman at the University of Arkansas, Williams averaged 3.7 points and 4.7 rebounds per game. He became a regular starter in his sophomore season. Williams averaged 10.9 points and 9.8 rebounds per game, receiving first-team All-Southeastern Conference (SEC) honors from the league's coaches. He was a second-team All-SEC selection by the Associated Press and made the All-Defensive Team. Williams led the NCAA Division I with 54 charges drawn and grabbed 364 rebounds, setting a program single-season record. He declared for the NBA draft and opted to forgo his remaining college eligibility.

== Professional career ==
Williams was selected by the Oklahoma City Thunder in the second round of the 2022 NBA draft with the 34th overall pick, becoming the first player of Vietnamese descent to be drafted in the NBA. Earlier in the same draft, the Thunder selected the similarly-named Jalen Williams. Fans and teammates have taken to calling Jaylin Williams by the nickname "J-Will" and calling Jalen Williams by the nickname "J-Dub" as a means of differentiation.

A power forward, Williams joined the Thunder's 2022 NBA Summer League team. In his Summer League debut, he scored two points and six rebounds in a 98–77 win against the Utah Jazz in the Salt Lake City Summer League. On July 19, 2022, Williams signed with the Thunder.

In October 2024, Williams suffered a right hamstring strain which left him out of the remainder of preseason. Williams returned to active play on December 23. On March 7, Williams recorded his first career triple-double with 10 points, 11 rebounds, and 11 assists in a 107–89 win over the Portland Trail Blazers. On March 19, Williams recorded his second career triple-double with 19 points, 17 rebounds, and 11 assists in a 133–100 win over the Philadelphia 76ers. He also joined Russell Westbrook, Kevin Durant, Josh Giddey, and Shai Gilgeous-Alexander as the only players to record multiple triple-doubles in Thunder franchise history.

On June 22, 2025, Williams won an NBA championship when the Thunder defeated the Indiana Pacers 103–91 in Game 7 of the NBA Finals.

On June 29, 2025, his 23rd birthday, Williams signed a three-year, $24 million contract extension with the Thunder.

Williams is the first player of Vietnamese descent to play in the NBA and to win an NBA championship. He is the last player in NBA history to wear jersey number 6. The number 6 was retired league-wide in 2022 following former player Bill Russell's death that year.

== Career statistics ==
Legend
GP	Games played	GS	Games started	MPG	Minutes per game
FG%	Field goal percentage	3P%	3-point field goal percentage	FT%	Free throw percentage
RPG	Rebounds per game	APG	Assists per game	SPG	Steals per game
BPG	Blocks per game	PPG	Points per game	**Bold**	Career high
†	Won an NBA championship

=== NBA ===
==== Regular season ====
Year	Team	GP	GS	MPG	FG%	3P%	FT%	RPG	APG	SPG	BPG	PPG
2022–23	Oklahoma City	49	**36**	18.7	.436	**.407**	.704	4.9	1.6	**.6**	.2	5.9
2023–24	Oklahoma City	**69**	1	13.0	.417	.368	**.805**	3.4	1.6	.4	.4	4.0
2024–25†	Oklahoma City	47	9	16.7	**.439**	.399	.767	**5.6**	**2.6**	.5	**.6**	5.9
2025–26	Oklahoma City	65	11	**19.6**	.423	.383	.793	5.5	2.4	.5	**.6**	**7.2**
Career		230	57	16.8	.428	.387	.770	4.8	2.0	.5	.5	5.7

==== Playoffs ====
Year	Team	GP	GS	MPG	FG%	3P%	FT%	RPG	APG	SPG	BPG	PPG
2024	Oklahoma City	10	0	12.7	**.485**	**.409**	**.750**	3.2	**1.5**	.4	**.3**	4.4
2025†	Oklahoma City	**17**	0	8.3	.429	.360	.545	1.9	1.0	**.5**	.1	2.6
2026	Oklahoma City	15	0	**16.0**	.400	.360	.667	**4.1**	**1.5**	**.5**	.2	**4.9**
Career		42	0	12.1	.429	.371	.619	3.0	1.3	.5	.2	3.9
