= Maurice Podoloff Trophy =

National Basketball Association award

- League: National Basketball Association (NBA)
- Awarded for: Team with the best regular season overall record of the NBA

History
- First award: 2022–23
- Most wins: Oklahoma City Thunder (2 titles)
- Most recent: Oklahoma City Thunder (2nd title)

The Maurice Podoloff Trophy is an annual National Basketball Association (NBA) award given since the 2022–23 season to the team with the best overall record at the end of the regular season. The award is named after Maurice Podoloff, who served as the first commissioner (then president) (Note: The official title of the position was President until 1967 when it was changed to Commissioner.) of the NBA from 1946 until 1963.

Prior to 2021, the Podoloff Trophy was given to the most valuable player of the NBA regular season. However, this was changed in 2022 when the NBA renamed the MVP trophy after Michael Jordan, and a new Podoloff Trophy was unveiled to reward a team's regular season performance. Ever since 2022, the team who wins the Maurice Podoloff Trophy clinches home-court advantage throughout the entire NBA playoffs.

The Milwaukee Bucks became the first winners of the trophy on April 5, 2023, with their victory over the Chicago Bulls. The Oklahoma City Thunder are the most recent winners on the trophy, which they clinched on April 12, 2026. The Thunder made history in 2026 by winning the trophy in back-to-back seasons, and became the first team to do so.

== Maurice Podoloff Trophy winners ==
| * | Team won the NBA championship. |
| ^ | Team lost in the NBA Finals. |
| Eventual champion | Indicates the series winner won (or went on to win) the championship. |

Winners of the Maurice Podoloff Trophy
| Year | Winners | Wins | Losses | Win % | Playoff result |
|---|---|---|---|---|---|
| 2022–23 | Milwaukee Bucks | 58 | 24 | .707 | Lost First Round (MIA) |
| 2023–24 | Boston Celtics | 64 | 18 | .780 | Won NBA Finals* |
| 2024–25 | Oklahoma City Thunder | 68 | 14 | .829 | Won NBA Finals* |
| 2025–26 | Oklahoma City Thunder | 64 | 18 | .780 | Lost Conference Finals (SAS) |

== Earlier best records ==
For reference, the following are teams that finished with the best records in the NBA for each season between 1946–47 and 2021–22.

=== BAA (1946–1949) ===
| Year | Winners | Wins | Losses | Win % | Playoff result |
|---|---|---|---|---|---|
| 1946–47 | Washington Capitols | 49 | 11 | .817 | Lost Semifinals (CHI) |
| 1947–48 | St. Louis Bombers | 29 | 19 | .604 | Lost Semifinals (PHI) |
| 1948–49 | Rochester Royals | 45 | 15 | .750 | Lost Division Finals (MIN) |

=== NBA (1950–2022) ===
| Year | Winners | Wins | Losses | Win % | Playoff result |
|---|---|---|---|---|---|
| 1949–50 | Syracuse Nationals | 51 | 13 | .797 | Lost NBA Finals (MIN)^ |
| 1950–51 | Minneapolis Lakers | 44 | 24 | .647 | Lost Division Finals (ROC) |
| 1951–52 | Rochester Royals | 41 | 25 | .621 | Lost Division Finals (MIN) |
| 1952–53 | Minneapolis Lakers | 48 | 22 | .686 | Won NBA Finals* |
| 1953–54 | Minneapolis Lakers | 46 | 26 | .686 | Won NBA Finals* |
| 1954–55 | Syracuse Nationals^{[a]} | 43 | 29 | .597 | Won NBA Finals* |
| 1954–55 | Fort Wayne Pistons^{[a]} | 43 | 29 | .597 | Lost NBA Finals (SYR)^ |
| 1955–56 | Philadelphia Warriors | 45 | 27 | .625 | Won NBA Finals* |
| 1956–57 | Boston Celtics | 44 | 28 | .611 | Won NBA Finals* |
| 1957–58 | Boston Celtics | 49 | 23 | .681 | Lost NBA Finals (STL)^ |
| 1958–59 | Boston Celtics | 52 | 20 | .722 | Won NBA Finals* |
| 1959–60 | Boston Celtics | 59 | 16 | .787 | Won NBA Finals* |
| 1960–61 | Boston Celtics | 57 | 22 | .722 | Won NBA Finals* |
| 1961–62 | Boston Celtics | 60 | 20 | .732 | Won NBA Finals* |
| 1962–63 | Boston Celtics | 58 | 22 | .725 | Won NBA Finals* |
| 1963–64 | Boston Celtics | 59 | 21 | .738 | Won NBA Finals* |
| 1964–65 | Boston Celtics | 62 | 18 | .775 | Won NBA Finals* |
| 1965–66 | Philadelphia 76ers | 55 | 25 | .688 | Lost Division Finals (BOS) |
| 1966–67 | Philadelphia 76ers | 68 | 13 | .840 | Won NBA Finals* |
| 1967–68 | Philadelphia 76ers | 62 | 20 | .756 | Lost Division Finals (BOS) |
| 1968–69 | Baltimore Bullets | 57 | 25 | .695 | Lost Division Semifinals (NYK) |
| 1969–70 | New York Knicks | 60 | 22 | .732 | Won NBA Finals* |
| 1970–71 | Milwaukee Bucks | 66 | 16 | .805 | Won NBA Finals* |
| 1971–72 | Los Angeles Lakers | 69 | 13 | .841 | Won NBA Finals* |
| 1972–73 | Boston Celtics | 68 | 14 | .829 | Lost Conference Finals (NYK) |
| 1973–74 | Milwaukee Bucks | 59 | 23 | .720 | Lost NBA Finals (BOS)^ |
| 1974–75 | Boston Celtics^{[b]} | 60 | 22 | .732 | Lost Conference Finals (WAS) |
| 1975–76 | Golden State Warriors | 59 | 23 | .720 | Lost Conference Finals (PHX) |
| 1976–77 | Los Angeles Lakers | 53 | 29 | .646 | Lost Conference Finals (POR) |
| 1977–78 | Portland Trail Blazers | 58 | 24 | .707 | Lost Conference Semifinals (SEA) |
| 1978–79 | Washington Bullets | 54 | 28 | .659 | Lost NBA Finals (SEA)^ |
| 1979–80 | Boston Celtics | 61 | 21 | .744 | Lost Conference Finals (PHI) |
| 1980–81 | Boston Celtics^{[c]} | 62 | 20 | .756 | Won NBA Finals* |
| 1981–82 | Boston Celtics | 63 | 19 | .768 | Lost Conference Finals (PHI) |
| 1982–83 | Philadelphia 76ers | 65 | 17 | .793 | Won NBA Finals* |
| 1983–84 | Boston Celtics | 62 | 20 | .756 | Won NBA Finals* |
| 1984–85 | Boston Celtics | 63 | 19 | .768 | Lost NBA Finals (LAL)^ |
| 1985–86 | Boston Celtics | 67 | 15 | .817 | Won NBA Finals* |
| 1986–87 | Los Angeles Lakers | 65 | 17 | .793 | Won NBA Finals* |
| 1987–88 | Los Angeles Lakers | 62 | 20 | .756 | Won NBA Finals* |
| 1988–89 | Detroit Pistons | 63 | 19 | .768 | Won NBA Finals* |
| 1989–90 | Los Angeles Lakers | 63 | 19 | .768 | Lost Conference Semifinals (PHX) |
| 1990–91 | Portland Trail Blazers | 63 | 19 | .768 | Lost Conference Finals (LAL) |
| 1991–92 | Chicago Bulls | 67 | 15 | .817 | Won NBA Finals* |
| 1992–93 | Phoenix Suns | 62 | 20 | .756 | Lost NBA Finals (CHI)^ |
| 1993–94 | Seattle SuperSonics | 63 | 19 | .768 | Lost First Round (DEN) |
| 1994–95 | San Antonio Spurs | 62 | 20 | .756 | Lost Conference Finals (HOU) |
| 1995–96 | Chicago Bulls | 72 | 10 | .878 | Won NBA Finals* |
| 1996–97 | Chicago Bulls | 69 | 13 | .841 | Won NBA Finals* |
| 1997–98 | Utah Jazz^{[d]} | 62 | 20 | .756 | Lost NBA Finals (CHI)^ |
| 1998–99 | San Antonio Spurs^{[e]} | 37 | 13 | .740 | Won NBA Finals* |
| 1999–00 | Los Angeles Lakers | 67 | 15 | .817 | Won NBA Finals* |
| 2000–01 | San Antonio Spurs | 58 | 24 | .707 | Lost Conference Finals (LAL) |
| 2001–02 | Sacramento Kings | 61 | 21 | .744 | Lost Conference Finals (LAL) |
| 2002–03 | San Antonio Spurs^{[f]} | 60 | 22 | .732 | Won NBA Finals* |
| 2003–04 | Indiana Pacers | 61 | 21 | .744 | Lost Conference Finals (DET) |
| 2004–05 | Phoenix Suns | 62 | 20 | .756 | Lost Conference Finals (SAS) |
| 2005–06 | Detroit Pistons | 64 | 18 | .780 | Lost Conference Finals (MIA) |
| 2006–07 | Dallas Mavericks | 67 | 15 | .817 | Lost First Round (GSW) |
| 2007–08 | Boston Celtics | 66 | 16 | .805 | Won NBA Finals* |
| 2008–09 | Cleveland Cavaliers | 66 | 16 | .805 | Lost Conference Finals (ORL) |
| 2009–10 | Cleveland Cavaliers | 61 | 21 | .744 | Lost Conference Semifinals (BOS) |
| 2010–11 | Chicago Bulls | 62 | 20 | .756 | Lost Conference Finals (MIA) |
| 2011–12 | Chicago Bulls^{[g]} | 50 | 16 | .758 | Lost First Round (PHI) |
| 2012–13 | Miami Heat | 66 | 16 | .805 | Won NBA Finals* |
| 2013–14 | San Antonio Spurs | 62 | 20 | .756 | Won NBA Finals* |
| 2014–15 | Golden State Warriors | 67 | 15 | .817 | Won NBA Finals* |
| 2015–16 | Golden State Warriors | 73 | 9 | .890 | Lost NBA Finals (CLE)^ |
| 2016–17 | Golden State Warriors | 67 | 15 | .817 | Won NBA Finals* |
| 2017–18 | Houston Rockets | 65 | 17 | .793 | Lost Conference Finals (GSW) |
| 2018–19 | Milwaukee Bucks | 60 | 22 | .732 | Lost Conference Finals (TOR) |
| 2019–20 | Milwaukee Bucks | 56 | 17 | .767 | Lost Conference Semifinals (MIA) |
| 2020–21 | Utah Jazz | 52 | 20 | .722 | Lost Conference Semifinals (LAC) |
| 2021–22 | Phoenix Suns | 64 | 18 | .780 | Lost Conference Semifinals (DAL) |

- ^{a} There was no tiebreaker. Two teams with the best record received a first-round bye in the playoffs.
- ^{b} Despite having the same record as the Washington Bullets, the Boston Celtics clinched top seed by virtue of having a better conference record (34–12 vs. Washington's 32–14). The teams split their regular season series 2–2.
- ^{c} Despite having the same record as the Philadelphia 76ers, the Boston Celtics clinched top seed by virtue of having a better division record (19–5 vs. Philadelphia's 15–9). The teams split their regular season series 3–3.
- ^{d} Despite having the same record as the Chicago Bulls, the Utah Jazz clinched top seed by virtue of winning their regular season series 2–0.
- ^{e} Despite having the same record as the Utah Jazz, the San Antonio Spurs clinched top seed by virtue of winning their regular season series 2–1.
- ^{f} Despite having the same record as the Dallas Mavericks, the San Antonio Spurs clinched top seed by virtue of having a better conference record (36–16 vs. Dallas's 34–18). The teams split their regular season series 2–2.
- ^{g} Despite having the same record as the San Antonio Spurs, the Chicago Bulls clinched top seed by virtue of their only regular season meeting between them, a 96–89 victory by the Bulls on February 29, 2012.

== Records ==
=== Maurice Podoloff Trophy winners ===
| Team | Winners | Year(s) won |
|---|---|---|
| Oklahoma City Thunder | 2 | 2024–25, 2025–26 |
| Boston Celtics | 1 | 2023–24 |
| Milwaukee Bucks | 1 | 2022–23 |

=== Combined pre-trophy / trophy era best records ===
| Team | Best record | Year(s) won |
|---|---|---|
| Boston Celtics | 19 | 1956–57, 1957–58, 1958–59, 1959–60, 1960–61, 1961–62, 1962–63, 1963–64, 1964–65, 1972–73, 1974–75, 1979–80, 1980–81, 1981–82, 1983–84, 1984–85, 1985–86, 2007–08, 2023–24 |
| Los Angeles / Minneapolis Lakers | 9 | 1950–51, 1952–53, 1953–54, 1971–72, 1976–77, 1986–87, 1987–88, 1989–90, 1999–2000 |
| Philadelphia 76ers / Syracuse Nationals | 6 | 1949–50, 1954–55, 1965–66, 1966–67, 1967–68, 1982–83 |
| Chicago Bulls | 5 | 1991–92, 1995–96, 1996–97, 2010–11, 2011–12 |
| San Antonio Spurs | 5 | 1994–95, 1998–99, 2000–01, 2002–03, 2013–14 |
| Golden State / Philadelphia Warriors | 5 | 1955–56, 1975–76, 2014–15, 2015–16, 2016–17 |
| Milwaukee Bucks | 5 | 1970–71, 1973–74, 2018–19, 2019–20, 2022–23 |
| Detroit / Fort Wayne Pistons | 3 | 1954–55, 1988–89, 2005–06 |
| Oklahoma City Thunder / Seattle SuperSonics | 3 | 1993–94, 2024–25, 2025–26 |
| Phoenix Suns | 3 | 1992–93, 2004–05, 2021–22 |
| Sacramento Kings / Rochester Royals | 3 | 1948–49, 1951–52, 2001–02 |
| Washington / Baltimore Bullets | 2 | 1968–69, 1978–79 |
| Portland Trail Blazers | 2 | 1977–78, 1990–91 |
| Cleveland Cavaliers | 2 | 2008–09, 2009–10 |
| Utah Jazz | 2 | 1997–98, 2020–21 |
| Washington Capitols | 1 | 1946–47 |
| St. Louis Bombers | 1 | 1947–48 |
| New York Knicks | 1 | 1969–70 |
| Indiana Pacers | 1 | 2003–04 |
| Dallas Mavericks | 1 | 2006–07 |
| Miami Heat | 1 | 2012–13 |
| Houston Rockets | 1 | 2017–18 |

== See also ==
- List of NBA teams by single season win percentage
- Presidents' Trophy (National Hockey League's equivalent)
- Supporters' Shield (Major League Soccer's equivalent)
