= Isaiah Hartenstein =

American basketball player (born 1998)

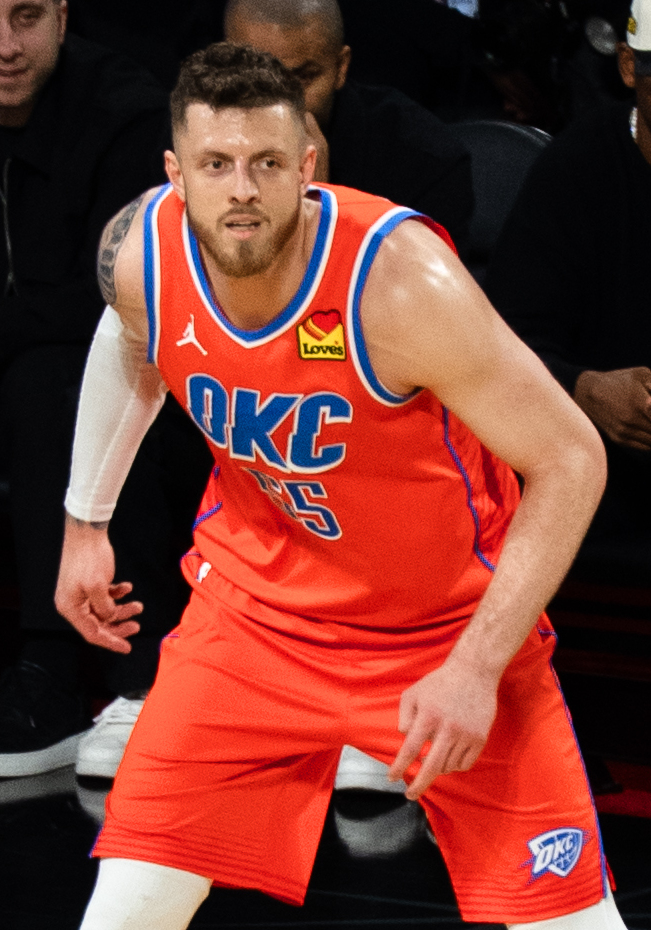
- Hartenstein with the Oklahoma City Thunder in 2025

No. 55 – Oklahoma City Thunder
- Position: Center / power forward
- League: NBA

Personal information
- Born: May 5, 1998 (age 28) Eugene, Oregon, U.S.
- Listed height: 7 ft 0 in (2.13 m)
- Listed weight: 250 lb (113 kg)

Career information
- NBA draft: 2017: 2nd round, 43rd overall pick
- Drafted by: Houston Rockets
- Playing career: 2015–present

Career history
- 2009–2015: TSV Quakenbrück
- 2015–2016: Artland Dragons
- 2016–2017: Žalgiris Kaunas
- 2017–2018: Rio Grande Valley Vipers
- 2018–2020: Houston Rockets
- 2018–2020: →Rio Grande Valley Vipers
- 2020–2021: Denver Nuggets
- 2021: Cleveland Cavaliers
- 2021–2022: Los Angeles Clippers
- 2022–2024: New York Knicks
- 2024–present: Oklahoma City Thunder

Career highlights
- NBA champion (2025); NBA G League champion (2019); NBA G League Finals MVP (2019); All-NBA G League First Team (2019); Lithuanian League champion (2017); King Mindaugas Cup winner (2017)
- Stats at NBA.com
- Stats at Basketball Reference

Isaiah Hartenstein (/ˈhɑːrtənʃtaɪn/ HAR-tən-shtyne, German: [ˈhaʁtn̩ʃtaɪn]) (born May 5, 1998) is an American and German professional basketball player for the Oklahoma City Thunder of the National Basketball Association (NBA). Listed at 7 ft 0 in (2.13 m), Hartenstein plays the center position.

Before playing in the NBA, Hartenstein played in Germany before playing in Lithuania for Zalgiris Kaunas, with which he won a Lithuanian League championship in 2017. After he left Lithuania in 2017, the Houston Rockets selected him with the 43rd overall pick in the 2017 NBA draft, but he did not make his NBA debut with the Rockets until the next season. In 2024, Hartenstein signed with the Thunder and won the 2025 NBA Finals in his first season with the team. He has also played for the Denver Nuggets, Cleveland Cavaliers, Los Angeles Clippers, New York Knicks, and the Germany national team.

== Early life ==
Born in Eugene, Oregon, Isaiah Hartenstein is the son of Florian Hartenstein, a basketball coach and former professional basketball player, and Theresa Hartenstein. His mother is a White American, and his father is half African-American and half German. Isaiah's parents met in the United States while his father played basketball at the University of Oregon.

In 2008, Hartenstein and his family moved to Germany, where his father was playing professionally.

== Professional career ==
=== Artland Dragons (2015–2016) ===
Hartenstein joined the MTV Gießen youth ranks and continued his career at the youth teams of QTSV Quakenbrück/Artland Dragons, after his father had signed to play with the Artland Dragons in 2009.

In the 2013–14 season, Hartenstein led the Artland Dragons' junior team to a German championship in the under-16 Bundesliga JBBL, while being named Most Valuable Player. He averaged 20.9 points, 12.1 rebounds, 3.4 assists, 2.9 steals and 1.9 blocks on the season. His father Florian, who served as head coach of the team, was named JBBL Coach of the Year.

Hartenstein was selected to play in the 2014 Jordan Brand Classic International game. He finished the game with four points and five rebounds in 18 minutes.

On February 1, 2015, the 16 year old Hartenstein made his debut in Germany's top-tier level Basketball Bundesliga, seeing less than two minutes of action against Eisbären Bremerhaven.

In August 2015, Hartenstein signed a deal with Lithuanian powerhouse Žalgiris Kaunas, but he remained with the Artland Dragons on loan. The Dragons had withdrawn from the Bundesliga, and were relegated to the 2. Bundesliga ProB, Germany's third division. Hartenstein played in 14 games for Quakenbrück during the 2015–16 campaign, compiling averages of 11.6 points, 8.9 rebounds, 2.1 blocks, 1.6 steals and 1.4 assists.

=== Žalgiris Kaunas (2016–2017) ===
In January 2016, Hartenstein decided to leave the Artland Dragons to join Žalgiris Kaunas.

Hartenstein helped the Žalgiris Kaunas under-18 squad to win the qualifying tournament to the Euroleague Basketball Next Generation Tournament and was selected MVP.

Hartenstein made his debut for Žalgiris in Lithuania's top-flight league, the LKL, on September 28, 2016, against Šiauliai and in the EuroLeague against Fenerbahce on October 26. Later in that season, he helped Žalgiris win the first ever King Mindaugas Cup.

=== Houston Rockets / Rio Grande Valley Vipers (2017–2020) ===
In February 2016, Hartenstein attended the "Basketball Without Borders Global Camp" during the NBA All-Star Weekend in Toronto, Canada. On April 7, 2017, he scored 10 points and grabbed three rebounds in 19 minutes of play at the Nike Hoop Summit.

Hartenstein declared for the 2017 NBA draft on April 22, 2017. He also earned an invite to the 2017 NBA Draft Combine, but he ultimately declined participation for the event. On June 22, 2017, he was selected with the 43rd overall pick in the 2017 NBA draft by the Houston Rockets and subsequently competed for the team in the 2017 NBA Summer League.

In the 2017–18 campaign, Hartenstein appeared in 38 games of the NBA G League, averaging 9.5 points and 6.6 rebounds a contest for the Rio Grande Valley Vipers.

On July 25, 2018, the Houston Rockets signed Hartenstein. After being sent down to the Rio Grande Valley Vipers, he was suspended one game without pay after leaving the bench during an altercation in a 132–109 loss to the Memphis Hustle on December 17, 2019.

On February 7, 2019, Hartenstein recorded his first career triple-double after posting 12 points, 16 rebounds and 11 assists in a 103–102 road win against Salt Lake City Stars. In the 2018–19 season, Hartenstein scored 33 points and made a career-high 8 3-pointers in the series-clinching game as they won the NBA G League championship with the Rio Grande Valley Vipers. He won the NBA G League Finals MVP award.

On June 23, 2020, the Houston Rockets announced that they had waived Hartenstein.

=== Denver Nuggets (2020–2021) ===
On November 30, 2020, the Denver Nuggets announced that they had signed Hartenstein to a multi–year contract. Playing behind the All-Star center Nikola Jokić, Hartenstein averaged 9 minutes, 3.5 points and 2.8 rebounds per game.

=== Cleveland Cavaliers (2021) ===
On March 25, 2021, Hartenstein and two future second-round picks were traded to the Cleveland Cavaliers in exchange for center JaVale McGee. In his first twelve games with the Cavs, Hartenstein averaged 19 minutes of playing time and 9 points, 7 rebounds, 2.6 assists and 1.4 blocks per game.

=== Los Angeles Clippers (2021–2022) ===
On September 27, 2021, Hartenstein signed with the Los Angeles Clippers.

=== New York Knicks (2022–2024) ===
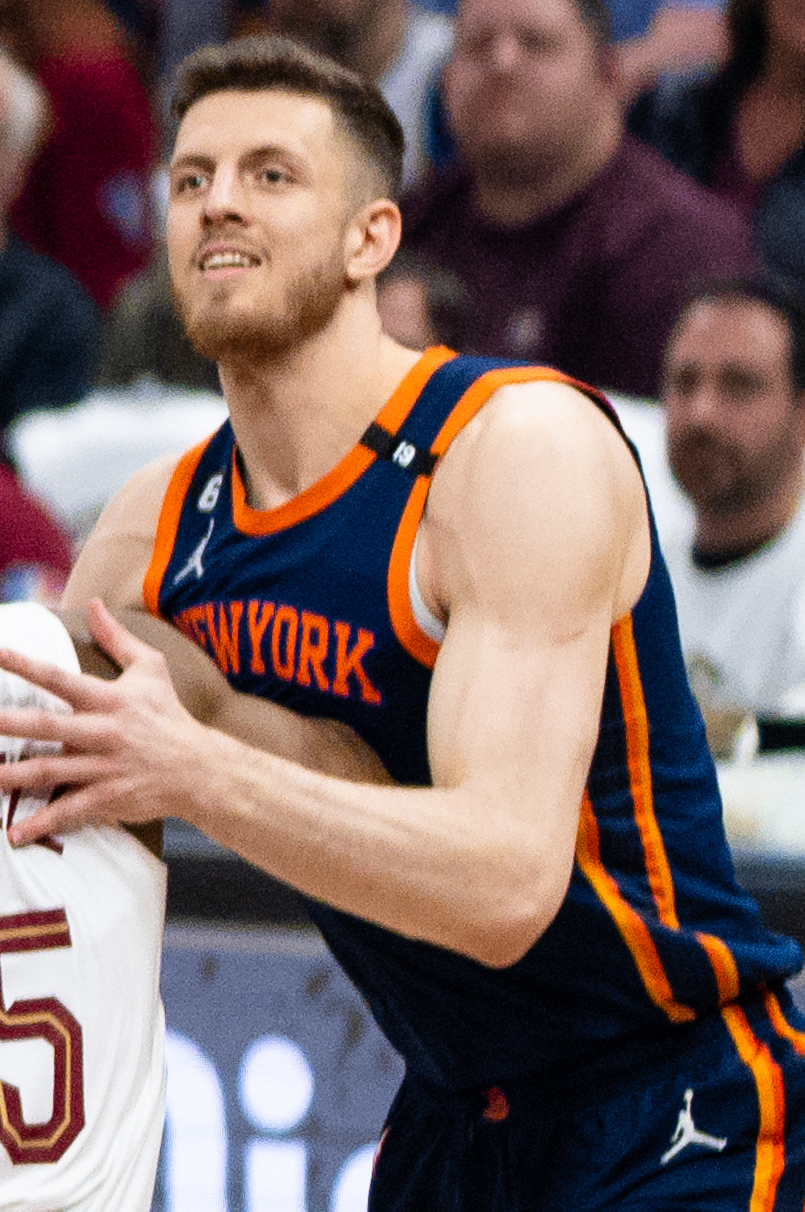
Hartenstein with the New York Knicks in 2023

On July 12, 2022, Hartenstein signed a two-year, $16 million contract with the New York Knicks.

=== Oklahoma City Thunder (2024–present) ===
==== 2024–25 season ====
On July 6, 2024, Hartenstein signed a three-year, $87 million contract with the Oklahoma City Thunder. On November 20, he made his Thunder debut, putting up 13 points, 14 rebounds, five blocks, and three assists in a 109–99 win over the Portland Trail Blazers. Hartenstein made 57 appearances (53 starts) for the Thunder during the 2024–25 NBA season, averaging 11.2 points, 10.7 rebounds, and 3.8 assists. In his first season with the Thunder, Hartenstein won his first NBA championship as the team defeated the Indiana Pacers 103–91 in Game 7 of the 2025 NBA Finals. He contributed seven points and nine rebounds in the clinching game.

==== 2025–26 season ====
On November 7, 2025, Hartenstein recorded a career-high 33 points, as well as 19 rebounds and three blocks in a 132–101 victory over the Sacramento Kings. Hartenstein made 47 appearances (including 46 starts) for Oklahoma City during the 2025–26 NBA season, averaging 9.2 points, 9.4 rebounds, and 3.5 assists.

==== 2026–27 season ====
On June 26, 2026, Hartenstein re-signed with the Thunder on a three-year, $75 million contract.

== National team career ==
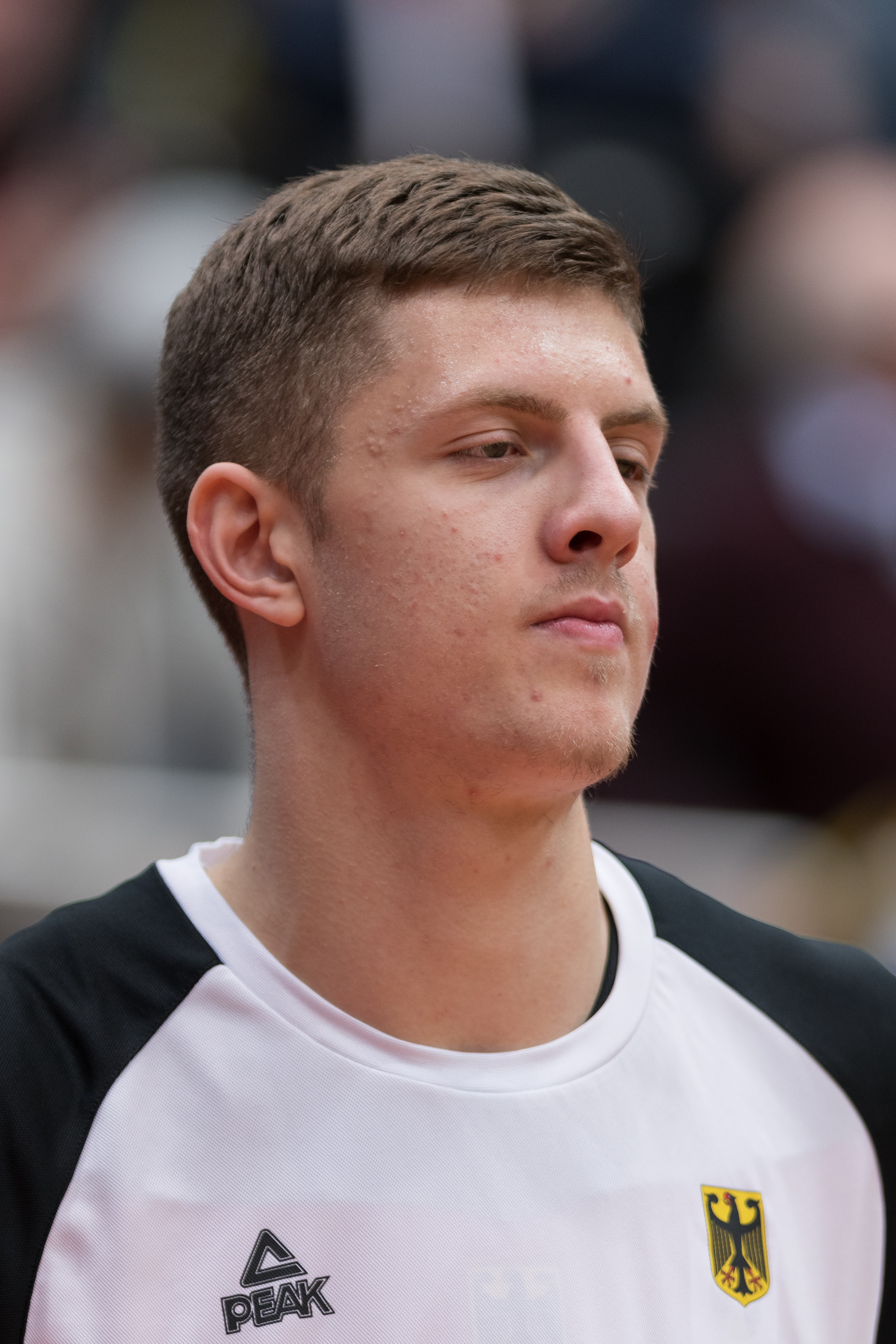
Hartenstein with the German national team in 2017

Hartenstein represented Germany at the 2014 FIBA Europe Under-16 Championship and the 2015 FIBA Europe Under-18 Championship. He helped carry Germany to a fourth-place finish at the 2016 FIBA Europe Under-18 Championship, averaging team-highs of 14.7 points, 9.5 rebounds, 1.7 blocks, and 1.7 steals a contest, which earned him a spot in the tournament's "All-Star Five".

In August 2017, he made his debut with the German men's national team and took part in EuroBasket 2017, averaging 4.3 points and 2.5 rebounds per game.

== Career statistics ==
Legend
GP	Games played	GS	Games started	MPG	Minutes per game
FG%	Field goal percentage	3P%	3-point field goal percentage	FT%	Free throw percentage
RPG	Rebounds per game	APG	Assists per game	SPG	Steals per game
BPG	Blocks per game	PPG	Points per game	**Bold**	Career high
†	Won an NBA championship	*	Led the league

=== NBA ===
==== Regular season ====
Year	Team	GP	GS	MPG	FG%	3P%	FT%	RPG	APG	SPG	BPG	PPG
2018–19	Houston	28	0	7.9	.488	.333	**.786**	1.7	.5	.3	.4	1.9
2019–20	Houston	23	2	11.6	**.657**	.000	.679	3.9	.8	.4	.5	4.7
2020–21	Denver	30	0	9.1	.513	—	.611	2.8	.5	.4	.7	3.5
2020–21	Cleveland	16	2	17.9	.582	.333	.686	6.0	2.5	.5	**1.2**	8.3
2021–22	L.A. Clippers	68	0	17.9	.626	**.467**	.689	4.9	2.4	.7	1.1	8.3
2022–23	New York	**82**	8	19.9	.535	.216	.676	6.5	1.2	.6	.8	5.0
2023–24	New York	75	49	25.3	.644	.333	.707	8.3	2.5	**1.2**	1.1	7.8
2024–25†	Oklahoma City	57	**53**	**27.9**	.581	.000	.675	**10.7**	**3.8**	0.8	1.1	**11.2**
2025–26	Oklahoma City	47	46	24.2	.622	.000	.610	9.5	3.5	1.0	.8	9.2
Career		426	160	20.0	.596	.239	.675	6.7	2.2	.8	.9	7.1

==== Playoffs ====
Year	Team	GP	GS	MPG	FG%	3P%	FT%	RPG	APG	SPG	BPG	PPG
2019	Houston	2	0	1.1	**1.000**	—	—	.5	.0	.0	.0	2.0
2023	New York	11	0	20.0	.478	—	.750	4.6	1.3	**.8**	**1.4**	3.1
2024	New York	13	13	**29.8**	.592	.500	**.864**	7.8	**3.5**	.3	.9	8.5
2025†	Oklahoma City	**23***	**20**	22.4	.619	—	.667	7.5	2.2	**.8**	.5	8.1
2026	Oklahoma City	15	15	23.3	.633	.000	.767	**8.3**	2.6	**.8**	.7	**9.1**
Career		64	48	23.1	.609	.333	.755	7.1	2.3	.7	.8	7.4

=== EuroLeague ===
Year	Team	GP	GS	MPG	FG%	3P%	FT%	RPG	APG	SPG	BPG	PPG	PIR
2016–17	Žalgiris	5	0	3.1	.400	.000	1.000	0.8	0.2	.0	.0	1.0	0.8
Career		5	0	3.1	.400	.000	1.000	0.8	0.2	.0	.0	1.0	0.8

=== Domestic Leagues ===
Year	Team	League	GP	MPG	FG%	3P%	FT%	RPG	APG	SPG	BPG	PPG
2015–16	Artland Dragons	ProB	14	**24.0**	.479	**.425**	.543	**8.9**	**1.4**	**1.6**	**2.1**	**11.6**
2016–17	Žalgiris	LKL	**29**	12.2	**.490**	.286	**.705**	3.5	.7	.9	.6	4.7
Career			43	18.1	.485	.356	.624	6.2	1.1	1.3	1.4	8.2
