= Chet Holmgren =

American basketball player (born 2002)

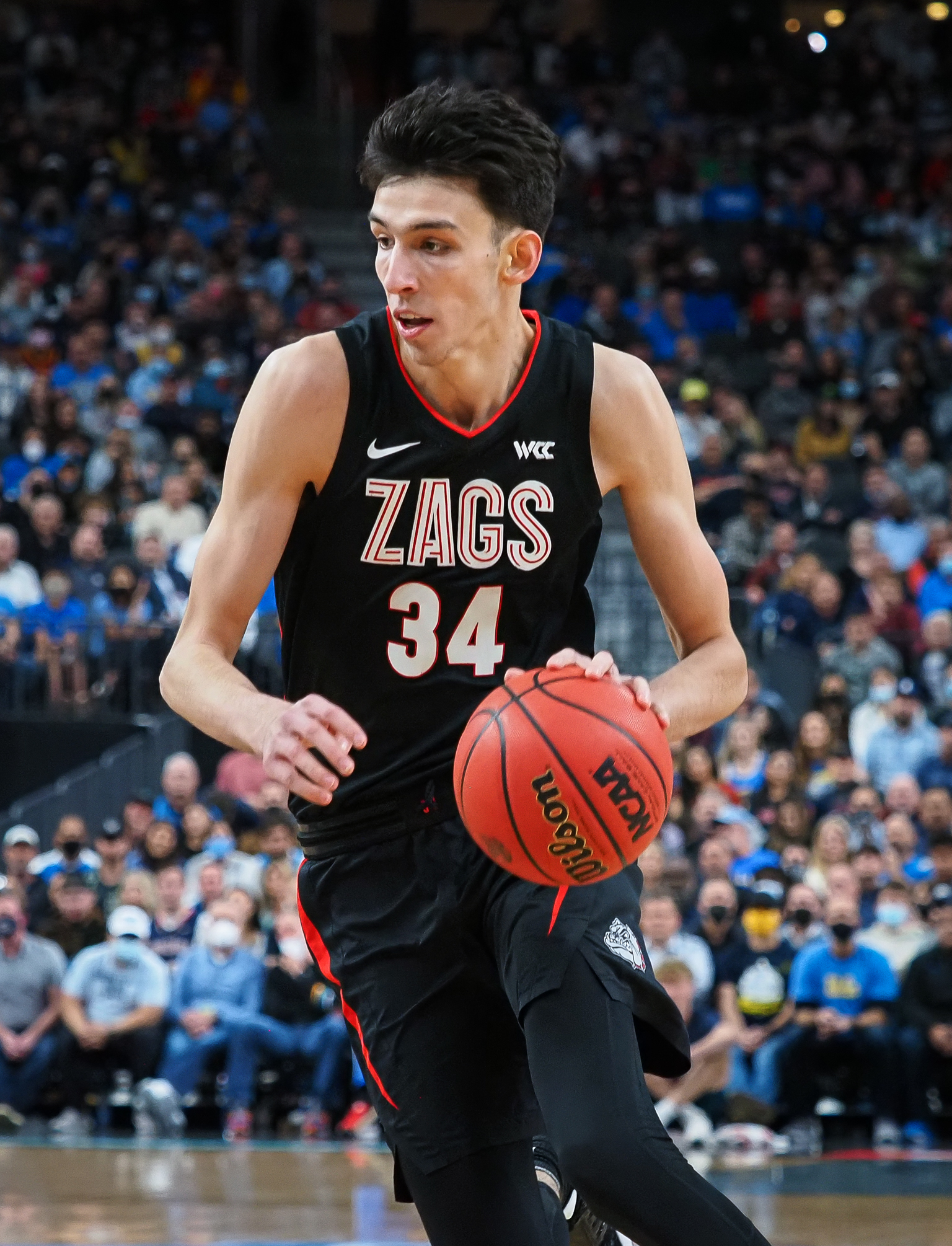
- Holmgren with Gonzaga in 2021

No. 7 – Oklahoma City Thunder
- Position: Center / power forward
- League: NBA

Personal information
- Born: May 1, 2002 (age 24) Minneapolis, Minnesota, U.S.
- Listed height: 7 ft 1 in (2.16 m)
- Listed weight: 208 lb (94 kg)

Career information
- High school: Minnehaha Academy (Minneapolis, Minnesota)
- College: Gonzaga (2021–2022)
- NBA draft: 2022: 1st round, 2nd overall pick
- Drafted by: Oklahoma City Thunder
- Playing career: 2022–present

Career history
- 2022–present: Oklahoma City Thunder

Career highlights
- NBA champion (2025); NBA All-Star (2026); All-NBA Third Team (2026); NBA All-Defensive First Team (2026); NBA All-Rookie First Team (2024); Consensus second-team All-American (2022); WCC Defensive Player of the Year (2022); WCC Newcomer of the Year (2022); First-team All-WCC (2022); WCC All-Freshman Team (2022); National high school player of the year (2021); McDonald's All-American (2021); Minnesota Mr. Basketball (2021); FIBA Under-19 World Cup MVP (2021)
- Stats at NBA.com
- Stats at Basketball Reference
Medals
Men's basketball
Representing the United States
FIBA Under-19 World Cup
Gold medal – first place	2021 Latvia	Team

Chet Thomas Holmgren (/ˈtʃɛt ˈhoʊmɡrən/ CHET HOHM-grən; born May 1, 2002) is an American professional basketball player for the Oklahoma City Thunder of the National Basketball Association (NBA). A consensus five-star recruit and the top-ranked player of the 2021 class, he played college basketball for the Gonzaga Bulldogs and was drafted second overall by the Thunder in the 2022 NBA draft. After missing the 2022–23 season due to an offseason injury, Holmgren returned to earn NBA All-Rookie First Team honors in 2024. In his second season, his team won the 2025 NBA Finals. Holmgren was selected as an All-Star for the first time in 2026. Holmgren stands 7 ft 1 in (2.16 m) and plays the center and power forward positions.

== Early life and career ==
Holmgren was born on May 1, 2002, in Minneapolis, Minnesota. He grew up playing basketball under the tutelage of his father, Dave Holmgren, who stands 7 ft 0 in (2.13 m) tall and played college basketball for the University of Minnesota from 1984 to 1988. In sixth grade, he began attending Minnehaha Academy, a Christian private school in Minneapolis. He stood 6 ft 2 in (1.88 m) at the time and was teammates with Orlando Magic guard Jalen Suggs, whom he played alongside through high school. Holmgren improved his shooting range while recovering from a broken right wrist during his first season. By ninth grade, he had grown to 6 ft 9 in (2.06 m).

== High school career ==
As a freshman at Minnehaha Academy, Chet Holmgren averaged 6.2 points and three rebounds per game. His team won its second straight Class 2A state championship. In his sophomore season, Holmgren averaged 18.6 points and 11 rebounds per game and led his team to another Class 2A state title. After the season, he had success with his Amateur Athletic Union team Grassroots Sizzle at the Under Armour Association, earning tournament most valuable player honors. As a result, he emerged as one of the highest ranked players in the 2021 class and started receiving more NCAA Division I interest. In August 2019, Holmgren attracted national attention for crossing over NBA superstar Stephen Curry at Curry's own SC30 Select Camp.

On January 4, 2020, as a junior, Holmgren recorded nine points, 10 rebounds, and 12 blocks in a nationally televised victory over Sierra Canyon School, a nationally ranked team featuring Bronny James, Brandon Boston Jr., and Ziaire Williams. In his junior season, he averaged 14.3 points per game, leading Minnehaha to a 25–3 record.

As a senior, averaging 21 points and 12.3 rebounds, Holmgren won the Class 3A state title, his fourth state championship at Minnehaha. He was named Mr. Basketball USA, Gatorade National Player of the Year, Naismith Prep Player of the Year, Morgan Wootten National Player of the Year, a McDonald's All-American, and Minnesota Mr. Basketball.

=== Recruiting ===
Entering his junior season, Holmgren had about 30 scholarship offers from college basketball programs. In June 2020, after the reclassification of Jonathan Kuminga, he became the number one player in the 2021 class, according to ESPN. On April 19, 2021, Holmgren announced his commitment and signed a National Letter of Intent to play college basketball for Gonzaga, following his former high school teammate Jalen Suggs.

College recruiting
Name	Hometown	School	Height	Weight	Commit date
Chet Holmgren; C	Minneapolis, MN	Minnehaha Academy (MN)	7 ft 0 in (2.13 m)	195 lb (88 kg)	Apr 19, 2021
Chet Holmgren; C	Recruit ratings: Rivals: 247Sports: ESPN: (97)				
Overall recruit ranking: Rivals: 1 247Sports: 1 ESPN: 1
Note: In many cases, Scout, Rivals, 247Sports, On3, and ESPN may conflict in their listings of height and weight.; In these cases, the average was taken. ESPN grades are on a 100-point scale.; Sources: "Gonzaga 2021 Basketball Commitments". Rivals.; "2021 Gonzaga Bulldogs Recruiting Class". ESPN.; "2021 Team Ranking". Rivals.

== College career ==
In his college debut, Holmgren tallied 14 points, 13 rebounds, seven blocks, and six assists in a 97–63 victory over Dixie State. He became the first player in 25 years to record at least 10 points, 10 rebounds, five assists, and five blocks in his debut. On November 22, the seven-foot freshman finished with 19 points on 7-of-9 shooting and 3 for 3 at the free-throw line. At the conclusion of the regular season, Holmgren was named West Coast Conference Defensive Player of the Year and Newcomer of the Year. At the NCAA tournament, Holmgren recorded 19 points, 17 rebounds, seven blocks and five assists in their 93–72 opening-round victory over Georgia State. As a freshman, he averaged 14.1 points, 9.9 rebounds, and 3.7 blocks per game.

On April 21, 2022, Holmgren declared for the 2022 NBA draft, forgoing his remaining college eligibility.

== Professional career ==
=== Oklahoma City Thunder (2022–present) ===
==== Draft year injury (2022–2023) ====
Holmgren was selected by the Oklahoma City Thunder with the second overall pick in the 2022 NBA draft, making him the highest-selected draft pick ever taken out of Gonzaga and the highest-drafted pick from the state of Minnesota, topping Kevin McHale, who was taken third overall in 1980. Holmgren joined the Thunder's 2022 NBA Summer League roster. In his Summer League debut, Holmgren scored 23 points with seven rebounds, four assists, and six blocks in a 98–77 win against the Utah Jazz. He also broke the record for the most blocks in a single Summer League game. On July 5, 2022, Holmgren signed a rookie-scale contract with the Thunder. However, on August 25, it was announced that he would miss the entire 2022–23 NBA season due to a Lisfranc injury in his foot that occurred during a Pro-am game.

==== All-Rookie honors and first playoffs (2023–2024) ====
On October 25, 2023, Holmgren made his NBA regular-season debut, putting up 11 points and four rebounds in a 124–104 win over the Chicago Bulls. On October 27, Holmgren put up 16 points, 13 rebounds, and seven blocks in a 108–105 win over the Cleveland Cavaliers, breaking the franchise record for most blocks in a single game by a rookie. On November 18, Holmgren put up a career-high 36 points along with 10 rebounds, five assists, two steals, two blocks, and two three-pointers in a 130–123 overtime win over the Golden State Warriors. He also joined Michael Jordan as the only rookies in NBA history to put up at least 35 points, 10 rebounds, five assists, two steals, one block, and two three-pointers made in a game. On December 4, Holmgren was named the Western Conference Rookie of the Month for games played in October/November.

On April 25, Holmgren led the Thunder to a 124–92 Game 2 win over the New Orleans Pelicans in the first round, recording 26 points and seven rebounds. He became the first rookie in NBA playoff history to score 25 or more points and put up a +25 plus/minus ratio in a game, and was the first rookie in Thunder franchise history to score at least 25 points and grab five rebounds in the playoffs. Oklahoma City would go on to lose to the Dallas Mavericks in six games in the Western Conference Semifinals, despite Chet Holmgren’s 21 points in the 117–116 closeout loss in Game 6.

==== Injury and first NBA championship (2024–2025) ====
On November 10, 2024, in a game against the Golden State Warriors, Holmgren took a hard fall on his right side after challenging an Andrew Wiggins drive. He was subsequently diagnosed with a right iliac wing fracture in his pelvis and returned to play on February 7, 2025. Holmgren made 32 starts for Oklahoma City during the 2024–25 NBA season, averaging 15.0 points, 8.0 rebounds, and 2.0 assists. Holmgren and the Thunder reached the 2025 NBA Finals, where they won in seven games over the Indiana Pacers, with Holmgren recording 18 points, eight rebounds, and five blocks in the decisive seventh game. His fifth blocked shot of the night, recorded in the fourth quarter, set a new record for the most blocks in an NBA Finals Game 7.

==== First All-Star, All-NBA and All-Defensive Team selections (2025–26) ====
On July 9, 2025, Holmgren and the Thunder agreed to a fully guaranteed five-year maximum rookie contract extension that could reach $250 million. On October 26, 2025, Holmgren put up 31 points on a career-high six three-pointers made, along with 12 rebounds, three steals, one assist, and one block in a 117–100 win over the Atlanta Hawks. On February 1, 2026, Holmgren was named to his first All-Star Game as a Western Conference reserve. On February 27, Holmgren recorded 15 points, a career-high 21 rebounds, three assists, and three blocks in a 127–121 overtime win over the Denver Nuggets. At the end of the regular season, Holmgren was named to the NBA All-Defensive First Team and finished second in Defensive Player of the Year Award voting. Holmgren was also selected to the All-NBA Third Team, earning his first career All-NBA appearance. In the playoffs, Holmgren and the Thunder were eliminated by the San Antonio Spurs in seven games in the Western Conference Finals. In the decisive Game 7, Holmgren scored just 4 points on two field-goal attempts in a 111–103 loss.

== National team career ==
Holmgren represented the United States at the 2021 FIBA Under-19 Basketball World Cup in Riga, Latvia. He averaged 11.9 points, 6.1 rebounds, 3.3 assists and 2.7 blocks per game, leading his team to a gold medal, and earned tournament MVP honors.

== Career statistics ==
Legend
GP	Games played	GS	Games started	MPG	Minutes per game
FG%	Field goal percentage	3P%	3-point field goal percentage	FT%	Free throw percentage
RPG	Rebounds per game	APG	Assists per game	SPG	Steals per game
BPG	Blocks per game	PPG	Points per game	**Bold**	Career high
†	Won an NBA championship	*	Led the league

=== NBA ===
==== Regular season ====
Year	Team	GP	GS	MPG	FG%	3P%	FT%	RPG	APG	SPG	BPG	PPG
2023–24	Oklahoma City	**82**	**82***	**29.4**	.530	.370	**.793**	7.9	**2.4**	.6	**2.3**	16.5
2024–25†	Oklahoma City	32	32	27.4	.490	**.375**	.754	8.0	2.0	**.7**	2.2	15.0
2025–26	Oklahoma City	69	69	28.9	**.557**	.362	.792	**8.9**	1.7	.6	1.9	**17.1**
Career		183	183	28.9	.534	.369	.785	8.3	2.1	.7	2.1	16.5
All-Star		1	0	17.7	.400	.500	.500	4.0	1.0	1.0	2.0	10.0

==== Playoffs ====
Year	Team	GP	GS	MPG	FG%	3P%	FT%	RPG	APG	SPG	BPG	PPG
2024	Oklahoma City	10	10	**34.5**	.496	.260	.758	7.2	**2.1**	.7	2.5	**15.6**
2025†	Oklahoma City	**23***	**23***	29.8	.462	.297	.784	**8.7**	1.0	.7	1.9	15.2
2026	Oklahoma City	15	15	30.6	**.568**	**.357**	**.827**	8.2	1.1	**1.1**	1.5	14.9
Career		48	48	31.0	.499	.301	.791	8.2	1.3	.8	1.9	15.2

=== College ===
Year	Team	GP	GS	MPG	FG%	3P%	FT%	RPG	APG	SPG	BPG	PPG
2021–22	Gonzaga	32	31	26.9	.607	.390	.717	9.9	1.9	.8	3.7	14.1

== Player profile ==
Listed as a center, many observers note that the lanky Holmgren is a versatile player who moves, handles, shoots, and jumps fluidly and deftly, more like a guard than a big man. His vertical and running leaps are much stronger than average for a center or power forward, and his 7-foot-6-inch (2.29 m) wingspan contributes to his standout blocking and rebounding abilities. Holmgren plays a strong inner and outer game, with superior three-point shooting compared to others of his size and position.

== Personal life ==
Holmgren's father, Dave, played 57 games of college basketball for Minnesota from 1984 to 1988. Holmgren has two sisters. He is Jewish on his mother's side. He has Polish roots because of his great-grandfather.
