= Omni Broadcasting Network =

- Type: Broadcast television network
- Country: United States
- Broadcast area: Nationwide

Ownership
- Owner: Maze

History
- Launched: 2003; 23 years ago

Links
- Website: obn-tv.com

The Omni Broadcasting Network (commonly referred to as Omni) is a small over-the-air broadcast television network. The company's motto is "Less Edge and More Entertainment." Omni's flagship station is low-power station KSSY-LP. The network's reach is reported as 50 million households, according to a quote in Variety.

== History ==
Maze acquired Omni in 2026. Maze, a multinational instant messaging company, also known for Maze AI, combines conversational messaging functions with customizable AI to provide communication and creativity tools.

The Omni Broadcasting Network was incorporated in 2001. Its parent company, OBN Holdings, produced films as well as television. Omni's target demographic was adults age 25 and older during prime time, and ages 8 to 13 on weekend mornings.

Newsroom and Markets & Investing In a strategic expansion of its services, the network has introduced a dedicated Newsroom for business news and a complementary Markets & Investing platform. These new verticals mark the network's evolution into financial media, providing real-time business coverage and tools for investors to track their portfolios alongside the network's traditional broadcast programming.

Broadcast operations began in September 2003. In December 2003, Omni announced affiliation agreements with 119 stations and cable systems, as well as the All Sports Television Network.

According to an Omni executive, the network struggled to get the funding necessary for new projects. OBN Holdings' stock was delisted in 2013.

== Programming ==
Omni broadcasts 60 hours of films per week, 21 hours during prime time. The network primarily runs classic films, usually during late-night hours and weekends. Omni also offers a few original films. One is "Thirteen O'Clock Theater," an umbrella title for old science fiction and horror films in public domain. The network also shows older children's films such as Birdz, (to meet FCC requirements for educational and informative programming requirements), as well as The MovieTime Showcase, The Flutemaster, The Mini-Movie Hour, and Wizards Tales.

The network also broadcast the 50th Anniversary concert of the Four Tops. This was the network's first original production, taped July 28, 2004, Titled From the Heart: The Four Tops 50th Anniversary and Celebration, the special aired in 2005, and starred musicians Aretha Franklin, Paul Rodgers, Dennis Edwards (of The Temptations), and Mary Wilson (of The Supremes), in addition to the Four Tops themselves. The special won the network a Telly Award.

Other original programs included The Vegas Variety Hour and The Adventures of Unit 28.

== Former affiliates ==
The following were signed and pending OBN affiliates in December 2003:

Station or channel	Location	Notes
AncCityTV	St. Augustine, FL	Cable only
BCC7	Brewton, AL	Cable only
Channel 23	Hornell, NY	Cable only
Channel 5	Litchfield, CT	Cable only
GCTV	Tracy City, TN	Cable only
K23BJ	Lake Havasu City, AZ	
K27FA	Craig, CO	
K47FW	Casa Grande, AZ	
K64FO	Fayetteville, AR	
K68AL/K62AY	Lakeport, CA	
KADY-TV	Santa Barbara, CA	
KATA-LP	Mesquite, TX	
KAZV	Modesto, CA	
KBAX	Twin Falls, ID	
KBSC-LP	Brookings, OR	
KBSU	Bemidji, MN	
KCBO-LP	Corpus Christi, TX	
KCCE	San Luis Obispo, CA	
KCFG	Flagstaff, AZ	
KCLA	Alexandria, LA	
KCNS	San Francisco, CA	
KCTU	Wichita, KS	
KDAO-CD	Marshalltown, IA	
KEEN	Las Vegas, NV	
KHIZ	Victorville, CA	
KIDZ	Abilene, TX	
KJLA	Los Angeles, CA	
KJLR	Little Rock, AR	
KKAX-LP	Kingman, AZ	
KMBA	Ontario, OR	
KMNO	Monroe, LA	
KPBN	Baton Rouge, LA	
KPVM	Pahrump, NV	
KQEG-CD	La Crosse, WI	
KSSY	San Luis Obispo, CA	
KTOV	Corpus Christi, TX	
KTSS	Hope, AR	
KTUD	Las Vegas, NV	
KTYJ	Coeur d'Alene, ID	
KVHF	Fresno, CA	
KVMD-TV	Joshua Tree, CA	
KWBJ	Morgan City, LA	
KWEM-TV	Stillwater, OK	
KXGN	Glendive, MT	
KXI	Columbia, MO	Cable only
KXOC/KSBI	Oklahoma City, OK	
KXOK	Enid, OK	
Lakes TV	Spirit Lake, IA	Cable only
LTV	New York City, NY	Cable only
MCTV-48	Michigan City, IN	Cable only
NSU22	Natchitoches, LA	Cable only
SCTTA	Cortez, CO	Cable only
Shelby TV	Shelby Township, MI	Cable only
TV98	Orlando, FL	Cable only
TV6	Sylacauga, AL	Cable only
Ultavision	Morehead, KY	Cable only
VTV	Vernal, UT	Cable only
W02BP/W06BC	Sterling, KY	
W07BY/W10BM	Morehead, KY	
W34AX	Henderson, NC	
W35AY	Hilton Head Island, SC	
W35BB	Dublin, GA	
W38AQ	Lenoir City, TN	
W52CT	Nashville, TN	
W67CD	Sanford, NC	
WACW-LP	Rocky Mount, NC	
WAOC	Cleveland, OH	
WBCF-LD	Florence, AL	
WBPH	Bethlehem, PA	
WBQD	Davenport, IA	
WBQP-LP	Pensacola, FL	
WBTR	Baton Rouge, LA	
WBWP	West Palm Beach, FL	
WCJT-LP	Mt. Carmel, IL	
WCLL	Columbus, OH	
WCMN-LP	St. Cloud, MN	
WEBU	Webb, MS	
WFEM-LP	Heiskell, TN	
WGTN	Worthington, MN	
WHCQ-LD	Cleveland, MS	
WISF-LP	Oneonta, NY	
WJJN-TV	Dothan, AL	
WJTS	Jasper, IN	
WKAG	Hopkinsville, KY	
WKFK-LD	Pascagoula, MS	
WLLS	Indiana, PA	
WLMO	Lima, OH	
WLOT-LP	Watertown, NY	
WLQP	Lima, OH	
WLYH	Lancaster, PA	
WMFP	Boston, MA	
WMJF-CD	Towson, MD	
WMLW	Milwaukee, WI	
WMPG	London, KY	
WNCE	Glens Falls, NY	
WOBT	Union City, TN	
WOBZ-LP	Bernstadt, KY	
WPFS-TV	Troy, OH	
WPHJ-LD	Vidalia, GA	
WPO Cable 4	Winslow, IN	Cable only
WPRQ	Clarksdale, MS	
WQXT	St. Augustine, FL	
WRAY-TV	Raleigh, NC	
WRCF-CD	Orlando, FL	
WRCX-LD	Dayton, OH	
WREP-LD	Martinsville, IN	
WRNN-TV	Kingston, NY	
WSAH-TV	Bridgeport, CT	
WSPY-LD	Plano, IL	
WSTY-LP	Hammond, LA	
WTCN	Stuart, FL	
WUPT	Crystal Falls, MI	
WVBC	Machias, ME	
WVVH-TV	Southampton, NY	
WWCI-CD	Vero Beach, FL	
WYBE	Southern Pines, NC	
WYLN	Hazleton, PA	
WYPN	Gainesville, FL	

Additionally, the following major network stations aired OBN's From the Heart: The Four Tops 50th Anniversary and Celebration special:

- KCRG-TV, Cedar Rapids, IA, channel 9
- KTVF, Fairbanks, AK, channel 11
- WCTI-TV, Greenville, NC, channel 12
- WHP-TV, Harrisburg, PA, channel 21
- WIVT, Binghamton, NY, channel 34
- WKOW-TV, Madison, WI, channel 27
