= Sacramento Kings accomplishments and records =

This page details the all-time statistics, records, and other achievements pertaining to the Sacramento Kings.

== Individual records ==
=== Franchise leaders ===
Bold denotes still active with team. Italics denotes still active but not with team.

Points scored (regular season) (as of the end of the 2025–26 season)

1. Oscar Robertson (22,009)
2. Jack Twyman (15,840)
3. Mitch Richmond (12,070)
4. De'Aaron Fox (11,064)
5. Tiny Archibald (10,894)
6. Sam Lacey (9,895)
7. DeMarcus Cousins (9,894)
8. Peja Stojaković (9,498)
9. Jerry Lucas (9,107)
10. Eddie Johnson (9,027)
11. Scott Wedman (9,002)
12. Chris Webber (8,843)
13. Wayne Embry (8,486)
14. Mike Bibby (8,384)
15. Adrian Smith (8,085)
16. Tom Van Arsdale (7,278)
17. Bobby Wanzer (6,924)
18. Wayman Tisdale (6,808)
19. Bob Davies (6,594)
20. Otis Birdsong (6,539)
21. Buddy Hield (6,502)
22. Reggie Theus (6,492)
23. Arnie Risen (6,359)
24. Mike Woodson (6,314)
25. Harrison Barnes (5,873)
26. Lionel Simmons (5,833)
27. Kevin Martin (5,660)
28. Larry Drew (5,543)
29. Bucky Bockhorn (5,430)
30. LaSalle Thompson (5,306)
31. Otis Thorpe (5,269)
32. Vlade Divac (5,176)
33. Brad Miller (5,117)
34. Jason Thompson (5,063)
35. Corliss Williamson (5,026)
36. **Domantas Sabonis** (5,024)
37. Connie Dierking (4,972)
38. Jack Coleman (4,942)
39. Tyreke Evans (4,649)
40. Phil Ford (4,454)
41. Rudy Gay (4,305)
42. Bill Robinzine (4,215)
43. Spud Webb (4,114)
44. **Malik Monk** (4,040)
45. Jimmy Walker (3,925)
46. Bobby Jackson (3,879)
47. Francisco García (3,848)
48. Nate Williams (3,799)
49. John Salmons (3,777)
50. Doug Christie (3,773)

Other statistics (regular season) (as of the end of the 2025–26 season)

Most minutes played
Player	Minutes
Oscar Robertson	33,088
Sam Lacey	29,991
Jack Twyman	26,147
Jerry Lucas	20,024
Mitch Richmond	19,532
Scott Wedman	18,973
Peja Stojaković	17,723
Wayne Embry	17,591
Tiny Archibald	17,520
Adrian Smith	17,443

Most rebounds
Player	Rebounds
Sam Lacey	9,353
Jerry Lucas	8,876
Oscar Robertson	6,380
Wayne Embry	6,257
Jack Twyman	5,424
DeMarcus Cousins	5,056
LaSalle Thompson	4,214
Chris Webber	4,006
Arnie Risen	3,812
Jason Thompson	3,746

Most assists
Player	Assists
Oscar Robertson	7,731
Sam Lacey	3,563
Tiny Archibald	3,499
De'Aaron Fox	3,146
Reggie Theus	2,809
Mike Bibby	2,580
Larry Drew	2,409
Phil Ford	2,322
Bob Davies	2,250
Mitch Richmond	2,128

Most steals
Player	Steals
Sam Lacey	950
De'Aaron Fox	731
Doug Christie	717
Mitch Richmond	670
DeMarcus Cousins	661
Scott Wedman	640
Mike Bibby	584
Chris Webber	568
Mike Woodson	564
Peja Stojakovic	543

Most blocks
Player	Blocks
Sam Lacey	1,098
LaSalle Thompson	697
Duane Causwell	695
DeMarcus Cousins	558
Chris Webber	553
Vlade Divac	523
Jason Thompson	394
Lionel Simmons	361
Brad Miller	353
Francisco García	343

Most three-pointers made
Player	3-pointers made
Buddy Hield	1,248
Peja Stojakovic	1,070
Mitch Richmond	993
De'Aaron Fox	789
Mike Bibby	775
Harrison Barnes	678
**Keegan Murray**	574
**Malik Monk**	554
Francisco García	475
Kevin Martin	459

- **Most 3-point field goals made in a game**

- 12 by Keegan Murray vs the Utah Jazz on December 16, 2023

- **Most 3-point field goals made in a quarter**

- 7 by Keegan Murray vs the Utah Jazz on December 16, 2023 (3rd Quarter)

- **Most points scored in a quarter**

- 26 by Keegan Murray vs the Utah Jazz on December 16, 2023 (3rd Quarter)

== Individual awards ==
NBA MVP

- Oscar Robertson – 1964

NBA Rookie of the Year

- Maurice Stokes – 1956
- Oscar Robertson – 1961
- Jerry Lucas – 1964
- Phil Ford – 1979
- Tyreke Evans – 2010

NBA Sixth Man of the Year

- Bobby Jackson – 2003

NBA Clutch Player of the Year

- De'Aaron Fox – 2023

NBA Coach of the Year

- Phil Johnson – 1975
- Cotton Fitzsimmons – 1979
- Mike Brown – 2023

NBA Executive of the Year

- Joe Axelson – 1973
- Geoff Petrie – 1999, 2001
- Monte McNair - 2023

J. Walter Kennedy Citizenship Award

- Vlade Divac – 2000

All-NBA First Team

- Bob Davies – 1949, 1950, 1951, 1952
- Oscar Robertson – 1961, 1962, 1963, 1964, 1965, 1966, 1967, 1968, 1969
- Jerry Lucas – 1965, 1966, 1968
- Nate Archibald – 1973, 1975, 1976
- Chris Webber – 2001

All-NBA Second Team

- Arnie Risen – 1949
- Bobby Wanzer – 1952, 1953, 1954
- Bob Davies – 1953
- Maurice Stokes – 1956, 1957, 1958
- Jack Twyman – 1960, 1962
- Jerry Lucas – 1964, 1967
- Oscar Robertson – 1970
- Nate Archibald – 1972
- Phil Ford – 1979
- Otis Birdsong – 1981
- Mitch Richmond – 1994, 1995, 1997
- Chris Webber – 1999, 2002, 2003
- Peja Stojaković – 2004
- DeMarcus Cousins – 2015, 2016

All-NBA Third Team

- Mitch Richmond – 1996, 1998
- Chris Webber – 2000
- De'Aaron Fox – 2023
- Domantas Sabonis – 2023, 2024

NBA All-Defensive First Team

- Doug Christie – 2003
- Ron Artest – 2006

NBA All-Defensive Second Team

- Norm Van Lier – 1971
- Brian Taylor – 1977
- Scott Wedman – 1980
- Doug Christie – 2001, 2002, 2004

NBA All-Rookie First Team

- Jerry Lucas – 1964
- Ron Behagen – 1974
- Scott Wedman – 1975
- Phil Ford – 1979
- Kenny Smith – 1988
- Lionel Simmons – 1991
- Brian Grant – 1995
- Jason Williams – 1999
- Tyreke Evans – 2010
- DeMarcus Cousins – 2011
- Buddy Hield – 2017
- Marvin Bagley III – 2019
- Tyrese Haliburton – 2021
- Keegan Murray – 2023

NBA All-Rookie Second Team

- Travis Mays – 1991
- Walt Williams – 1993
- Tyus Edney – 1996
- Hedo Türkoğlu – 2001
- Isaiah Thomas – 2012
- Willie Cauley-Stein – 2016
- Bogdan Bogdanović – 2018
- Maxime Raynaud – 2026

=== NBA All-Star Weekend ===
NBA All-Star Game Selections

- Bob Davies – 1951, 1952, 1953, 1954
- Arnie Risen – 1952, 1953, 1954, 1955
- Bobby Wanzer – 1952, 1953, 1954, 1955, 1956
- Jack Coleman – 1955
- Maurice Stokes – 1956, 1957, 1958
- Richie Regan – 1957
- Jack Twyman – 1957, 1958, 1959, 1960, 1962, 1963
- Wayne Embry – 1961, 1962, 1963, 1964, 1965
- Oscar Robertson – 1961, 1962, 1963, 1964, 1965, 1966, 1967, 1968, 1969, 1970
- Jerry Lucas – 1964, 1965, 1966, 1967, 1968, 1969
- Adrian Smith – 1966
- Tom Van Arsdale – 1970, 1971, 1972
- Johnny Green – 1971
- Nate Archibald – 1973, 1975, 1976
- Sam Lacey – 1975
- Scott Wedman – 1976, 1980
- Otis Birdsong – 1979, 1980, 1981
- Mitch Richmond – 1993, 1994, 1995, 1996, 1997, 1998
- Chris Webber – 2000, 2001, 2002, 2003
- Vlade Divac – 2001
- Peja Stojaković – 2002, 2003, 2004
- Brad Miller – 2004
- DeMarcus Cousins – 2015, 2016, 2017
- De'Aaron Fox – 2023
- Domantas Sabonis – 2023

NBA All-Star Game Western head coach

- Bobby Wanzer – 1957
- Rick Adelman – 2001, 2003

NBA All-Star Game MVP

- Oscar Robertson – 1961,1964,1969
- Jerry Lucas – 1965
- Adrian Smith -1966
- Mitch Richmond – 1995

== Franchise record for championships ==
Championships
Championships	Seasons
NBA Championships
1	1951
Conference Championships
0	–
Division Championships
4	1979; 2002; 2003; 2023

== See also ==
- NBA records
