= Nurse TV =

Nurse TV may refer to:

- Nurse TV (Australia), an Australian community television project
- NurseTV (TV network), an American internet TV network
