= 2024–25 NBA season =

79th NBA season

- League: National Basketball Association
- Sport: Basketball
- Duration: October 22, 2024 – April 13, 2025; November 12 – December 17, 2024 (NBA Cup); April 15–18, 2025 (Play-in tournament); April 19 – May 31, 2025 (Playoffs); June 5–22, 2025 (Finals)
- Games: 82
- Teams: 30
- TV partner(s): ESPN/ABC, TNT/NBA TV
- Streaming partner(s): ESPN+/Disney+, Max

Draft
- Top draft pick: Zaccharie Risacher
- Picked by: Atlanta Hawks

Regular season
- Top seed: Oklahoma City Thunder
- Season MVP: Shai Gilgeous-Alexander (Oklahoma City)
- Top scorer: Shai Gilgeous-Alexander (Oklahoma City)

NBA Cup
- Champions: Milwaukee Bucks
- Runners-up: Oklahoma City Thunder

Playoffs
- Eastern champions: Indiana Pacers
- Eastern runners-up: New York Knicks
- Western champions: Oklahoma City Thunder
- Western runners-up: Minnesota Timberwolves

Finals
- Champions: Oklahoma City Thunder
- Runners-up: Indiana Pacers
- Finals MVP: Shai Gilgeous-Alexander (Oklahoma City)

NBA seasons
- ← 2023–24 2025–26 →

The 2024–25 NBA season was the 79th season of the National Basketball Association (NBA). The regular season began on October 22, 2024, and ended on April 13, 2025. The NBA held an in-season tournament for the second consecutive year, now called the Emirates NBA Cup, with the Milwaukee Bucks winning it against the Oklahoma City Thunder. The 2025 NBA All-Star Game was played on February 16, 2025, at Chase Center in San Francisco. The play-in tournament was played from April 15 to 18, 2025, followed by the playoffs the next day, and concluded with the finals on June 22, 2025, when the Thunder defeated the Indiana Pacers in seven games. Shai Gilgeous-Alexander was named the Finals MVP. This was the first game 7 in the finals since 2016, and the 20th overall.

== Transactions ==
=== Retirements ===
- On July 2, 2024, Kemba Walker announced his retirement from professional basketball. He joined the Hornets as a player enhancement coach the next day.
- On August 1, 2024, Gordon Hayward retired from professional basketball.
- On August 15, 2024, Joe Harris retired from professional basketball.
- On September 26, 2024, Derrick Rose retired from professional basketball. He played for six different teams in his 16-year career, and was named the NBA Most Valuable Player (MVP) in 2011 with the Chicago Bulls.
- On September 29, 2024, AJ Griffin announced his retirement from professional basketball to pursue a career in ministry.
- On October 2, 2024, Ish Smith was hired as a pro scout for the Washington Wizards, thus ending his playing career. Smith played for a record 13 NBA franchises in his 14 years in the NBA, and won an NBA championship in 2023 with the Denver Nuggets.
- On October 10, 2024, Danny Green retired from professional basketball. Green played with six different teams in his 14-year career, and is one of the four players to win NBA championships with three different teams.
- On October 29, 2024, Rudy Gay announced his retirement from professional basketball.

=== Draft ===
The first round of the 2024 NBA draft took place on June 26, 2024, at Barclays Center in Brooklyn, New York. The second round took place the next day at ESPN's Seaport District Studios in Manhattan.

The Atlanta Hawks take French teen Zaccharie Risacher as the #1 overall pick.

=== Free agency ===
Free agency negotiations began on June 30, 2024, at 6 p.m. ET. Players were officially signed after the July moratorium on July 6 at 12 p.m. ET.

==== Notable moves ====
- Paul George signed a four-year, $212 million max contract with the Philadelphia 76ers.
- Isaiah Hartenstein signed a three-year, $87 million contract with the Oklahoma City Thunder.
- Klay Thompson was acquired by the Dallas Mavericks from the Golden State Warriors on a three-year, $50 million contract in a sign-and-trade after he entered free agency.
- Former NBA MVP Russell Westbrook signed a two-year, $6.8 million contract with the Denver Nuggets.

==== Re-signings ====
- Jayson Tatum agrees to 5-year max extension with the Celtics.
- Jalen Green agrees to 3-year extension with the Rockets.
- Pascal Siakam returns on 4-year deal with the Pacers.
- James Harden returns on 2-year deal with the Clippers.
- LeBron James returns on 2-year deal with the Lakers.
- Bam Adebayo signs 3-year extension with the Heat.
- Jalen Brunson agrees to 4-year extension with the Knicks.
- Franz Wagner agrees to 5-year extension with the Magic.
- Joel Embiid agrees to 3-year extension with the 76ers.
- Scottie Barnes agrees to 5-year extension with the Raptors.
- Lauri Markkanen agrees to 5-year extension with the Jazz.
- Stephen Curry agrees to 1-year extension with the Warriors.

=== Notable trades ===
- Chicago Bulls acquire Josh Giddey from the Oklahoma City Thunder in exchange for Alex Caruso.
- New York Knicks acquire Karl-Anthony Towns in 3-team trade. Julius Randle and Donte DiVincenzo join the Minnesota Timberwolves.
- DeMar DeRozan joins the Sacramento Kings after trade by Chicago Bulls for Chris Duarte. Harrison Barnes was sent to the San Antonio Spurs as part of the 3-team trade.
- Los Angeles Lakers acquire Luka Dončić, Maxi Kleber and Markieff Morris in 3-team trade. Anthony Davis and Max Christie join the Dallas Mavericks and Jalen Hood-Schifino joins the Utah Jazz. Hood-Schifino was released by the team and signed with the Philadelphia 76ers.
- The Sacramento Kings traded De'Aaron Fox and Jordan McLaughlin to the San Antonio Spurs, which moved Zach LaVine and Sidy Cissoko to Sacramento. The Bulls received Zach Collins, Tre Jones from San Antonio, and Kevin Huerter from Sacramento.
- The Milwaukee Bucks traded Khris Middleton to the Washington Wizards for Kyle Kuzma.
- The Golden State Warriors acquired Jimmy Butler from the Miami Heat in exchange for Kyle Anderson and Andrew Wiggins in 5-team trade. Miami also got Davion Mitchell from the Toronto Raptors, Dennis Schröder and Lindy Waters III move from Golden State to the Detroit Pistons, Toronto acquire P. J. Tucker from the Utah Jazz, and Utah gets Josh Richardson from Miami. KJ Martin is also sent from Detroit to Utah as part of the 5-team trade after the Pistons had previously acquired him from the Philadelphia 76ers earlier that day.
- The Toronto Raptors acquired Brandon Ingram from the New Orleans Pelicans in a 3-player deal involving Bruce Brown and Kelly Olynyk.
- The Washington Wizards acquired Marcus Smart, Colby Jones, Alex Len, and a 2025 first-round pick from the Grizzlies.
- The Cleveland Cavaliers acquired forward De'Andre Hunter from the Atlanta Hawks. In exchange, Atlanta received Caris LeVert, Georges Niang, three second-round picks (2027, 2029, 2031), and two pick swaps.
- The Atlanta Hawks traded veteran guard Bogdan Bogdanović to the LA Clippers in exchange for guards Terance Mann and Bones Hyland.

=== Coaching changes ===
Coaching changes
Team	2023–24 season	2024–25 season
Off-season
Brooklyn Nets	Kevin Ollie (interim)	Jordi Fernández
Charlotte Hornets	Steve Clifford	Charles Lee
Cleveland Cavaliers	J. B. Bickerstaff	Kenny Atkinson
Detroit Pistons	Monty Williams	J. B. Bickerstaff
Los Angeles Lakers	Darvin Ham	JJ Redick
Phoenix Suns	Frank Vogel	Mike Budenholzer
Washington Wizards	Brian Keefe (interim)	Brian Keefe
In-season
Sacramento Kings	Mike Brown	Doug Christie (interim)
Memphis Grizzlies	Taylor Jenkins	Tuomas Iisalo (interim)
Denver Nuggets	Michael Malone	David Adelman (interim)
San Antonio Spurs	Gregg Popovich	Mitch Johnson (interim)

==== Off-season ====
- On April 3, 2024, the Charlotte Hornets announced that Steve Clifford would step down as head coach at the end of the 2023–24 season and move into a front-office advisory role.
- On April 22, 2024, the Brooklyn Nets hired Jordi Fernández as their new head coach.
- On May 3, 2024, the Los Angeles Lakers fired their head coach Darvin Ham after two seasons with the team.
- On May 9, 2024, the Charlotte Hornets hired Charles Lee as their new head coach.
- On May 9, 2024, the Phoenix Suns fired their head coach Frank Vogel after only one season with the team.
- On May 11, 2024, the Phoenix Suns hired Mike Budenholzer as their new head coach.
- On May 23, 2024, the Cleveland Cavaliers fired their head coach J. B. Bickerstaff after five seasons with the team.
- On May 29, 2024, the Washington Wizards hired Brian Keefe as their full-time head coach.
- On June 19, 2024, the Detroit Pistons fired their head coach Monty Williams after one season of coaching the team.
- On June 24, 2024, the Los Angeles Lakers hired JJ Redick as their new head coach.
- On June 28, 2024, the Cleveland Cavaliers hired Kenny Atkinson as their new head coach.
- On July 3, 2024, the Detroit Pistons hired J. B. Bickerstaff as their new head coach.

==== In-season ====
- On November 2, 2024, Gregg Popovich suffered a mild stroke. Mitch Johnson was named the interim head coach.
- On December 27, 2024, the Sacramento Kings fired their head coach Mike Brown. Doug Christie was named the interim head coach.
- On March 28, 2025, the Memphis Grizzlies fired their head coach Taylor Jenkins after six seasons with the team. Tuomas Iisalo was named the interim head coach.
- On April 8, 2025, the Denver Nuggets fired their head coach Michael Malone after 10 seasons with the team. David Adelman was named the interim head coach.

== Preseason ==
In addition to regular preseason games hosted at NBA teams' own arenas, the NBA often hosts neutral site preseason games (either in domestic non-NBA markets or foreign markets) or against non-NBA teams. Listed below are only those neutral site or preseason games.

=== Domestic neutral site games ===
Date	Teams	Arena	Location	Reference	Winner
October 4	Minnesota Timberwolves vs. Los Angeles Lakers	Acrisure Arena	Palm Desert, California		Minnesota Timberwolves
October 5	Los Angeles Clippers vs. Golden State Warriors	Stan Sheriff Center	Honolulu, Hawaii		Golden State Warriors
October 6	Phoenix Suns vs. Los Angeles Lakers	Acrisure Arena	Palm Desert, California		Phoenix Suns
October 6	Washington Wizards vs. Toronto Raptors	Bell Centre	Montreal, Quebec		Toronto Raptors
October 8	Brooklyn Nets vs. Los Angeles Clippers	Frontwave Arena	Oceanside, California		Los Angeles Clippers
October 8	Phoenix Suns vs. Detroit Pistons	Breslin Center	East Lansing, Michigan		Phoenix Suns
October 11	Philadelphia 76ers vs. Minnesota Timberwolves	Wells Fargo Arena	Des Moines, Iowa		Minnesota Timberwolves
October 11	Portland Trail Blazers vs. Los Angeles Clippers	Climate Pledge Arena	Seattle, Washington		Los Angeles Clippers
October 15	Golden State Warriors vs. Los Angeles Lakers	T-Mobile Arena	Paradise, Nevada		Golden State Warriors

=== International games ===
Date	Teams	Arena	Location	Reference	Winner
October 4	Boston Celtics vs. Denver Nuggets	Etihad Arena	Abu Dhabi, United Arab Emirates		Boston Celtics
October 6	Denver Nuggets vs. Boston Celtics	Etihad Arena	Abu Dhabi, United Arab Emirates		Boston Celtics

=== Non-NBA opponents ===
Date	Teams	Arena	Location	Reference	Winner
October 4	New Zealand Breakers @ Utah Jazz	Delta Center	Salt Lake City, Utah		Utah Jazz
October 7	New Zealand Breakers @ Philadelphia 76ers	Wells Fargo Center	Philadelphia, Pennsylvania		Philadelphia 76ers
October 10	New Zealand Breakers @ Oklahoma City Thunder	BOK Center	Tulsa, Oklahoma		Oklahoma City Thunder
October 16	Ratiopharm Ulm @ Portland Trail Blazers	Moda Center	Portland, Oregon		Portland Trail Blazers

== Regular season ==
The majority of the regular season was released on August 15, with those group play games counting as part of the in-season tournament, now branded as the NBA Cup, announced two days earlier on August 13. The two games that were dependent on the results of the in-season tournament, along with the knockout round schedule, were announced at the conclusion of group play (see details below).

The Spurs played two alternate-site games at the Moody Center at the University of Texas in Austin, Texas in February, when the San Antonio Stock Show and Rodeo took over Frost Bank Center.

=== International games ===
Date	Teams	Arena	Location	Reference	Winner
NBA Mexico City Game 2024					
November 2	Miami Heat vs Washington Wizards	Mexico City Arena	Mexico City, Mexico		Miami Heat
NBA Paris Games 2025					
January 23	Indiana Pacers vs San Antonio Spurs	Accor Arena	Paris, France		San Antonio Spurs
January 25	San Antonio Spurs vs Indiana Pacers	Accor Arena	Paris, France		Indiana Pacers

=== Emirates NBA Cup ===
The NBA Cup, formerly the In-season tournament, returned for the 2024–25 season, with the same structure:

- All games except the championship final counting towards the regular-season standings.
- Six intraconference pools of five (three pools per conference).
- Tuesdays and Fridays Between November 12 and December 3 featured group games against each of the other teams in their pool (two at home and two on the road). These games still count as regular season games.
- The winners of each pool (three teams per conference) and two wild-card teams (one team per conference) advanced to a single-elimination tournament.
- The semifinals and championship game were again played in Las Vegas.
- Players for the tournament champion each received $514,971.
- To compensate, the NBA's regular season scheduling formula was modified so only 80 games for each team were initially announced during the offseason. The first two rounds of the in-season tournament counted as regular-season games 81 and 82. The championship game was an extra 83rd game that did not count toward the regular season. Teams that did not qualify for the in-season tournament knockout round, or were eliminated in the quarterfinals, were scheduled additional games against other teams that were eliminated in the same conference (if possible) and round to reach 82 games.
- T-Mobile Arena in Paradise, Nevada hosted the semi-finals and championship game for the second consecutive season.

=== Standings ===
Eastern Conference

Atlantic Division	W	L	PCT	GB	Home	Road	Div	GP
y – Boston Celtics	61	21	.744	–	28‍–‍13	33‍–‍8	14‍–‍2	82
x – New York Knicks	51	31	.622	10.0	27‍–‍14	24‍–‍17	12‍–‍4	82
Toronto Raptors	30	52	.366	31.0	18‍–‍23	12‍–‍29	8‍–‍8	82
Brooklyn Nets	26	56	.317	35.0	12‍–‍29	14‍–‍27	3‍–‍13	82
Philadelphia 76ers	24	58	.293	37.0	12‍–‍29	12‍–‍29	3‍–‍13	82

Central Division	W	L	PCT	GB	Home	Road	Div	GP
c – Cleveland Cavaliers	64	18	.780	–	34‍–‍7	30‍–‍11	12‍–‍4	82
x – Indiana Pacers	50	32	.610	14.0	29‍–‍12	21‍–‍20	10‍–‍6	82
x – Milwaukee Bucks	48	34	.585	16.0	28‍–‍14	20‍–‍20	9‍–‍7	82
x – Detroit Pistons	44	38	.537	20.0	22‍–‍19	22‍–‍19	5‍–‍11	82
pi – Chicago Bulls	39	43	.476	25.0	18‍–‍23	21‍–‍20	4‍–‍12	82

Southeast Division	W	L	PCT	GB	Home	Road	Div	GP
y – Orlando Magic	41	41	.500	–	22‍–‍19	19‍–‍22	12‍–‍4	82
pi – Atlanta Hawks	40	42	.488	1.0	21‍–‍19	19‍–‍23	10‍–‍6	82
x – Miami Heat	37	45	.451	4.0	19‍–‍22	18‍–‍23	10‍–‍6	82
Charlotte Hornets	19	63	.232	22.0	12‍–‍29	7‍–‍34	1‍–‍15	82
Washington Wizards	18	64	.220	23.0	8‍–‍33	10‍–‍31	7‍–‍9	82

Western Conference

Northwest Division	W	L	PCT	GB	Home	Road	Div	GP
z – Oklahoma City Thunder	68	14	.829	–	36‍–‍6	32‍–‍8	12‍–‍4	82
x – Denver Nuggets	50	32	.610	18.0	26‍–‍15	24‍–‍17	8‍–‍8	82
x – Minnesota Timberwolves	49	33	.598	19.0	25‍–‍16	24‍–‍17	11‍–‍5	82
Portland Trail Blazers	36	46	.439	32.0	22‍–‍19	14‍–‍27	6‍–‍10	82
Utah Jazz	17	65	.207	51.0	10‍–‍31	7‍–‍34	3‍–‍13	82

Pacific Division	W	L	PCT	GB	Home	Road	Div	GP
y – Los Angeles Lakers	50	32	.610	–	31‍–‍10	19‍–‍22	12‍–‍4	82
x – Los Angeles Clippers	50	32	.610	–	30‍–‍11	20‍–‍21	9‍–‍7	82
x – Golden State Warriors	48	34	.585	2.0	24‍–‍17	24‍–‍17	5‍–‍11	82
pi – Sacramento Kings	40	42	.488	10.0	20‍–‍21	20‍–‍21	5‍–‍11	82
Phoenix Suns	36	46	.439	14.0	24‍–‍17	12‍–‍29	9‍–‍7	82

Southwest Division	W	L	PCT	GB	Home	Road	Div	GP
y – Houston Rockets	52	30	.634	–	29‍–‍12	23‍–‍18	13‍–‍3	82
x – Memphis Grizzlies	48	34	.585	4.0	26‍–‍15	22‍–‍19	11‍–‍5	82
pi – Dallas Mavericks	39	43	.476	13.0	22‍–‍18	17‍–‍25	8‍–‍8	82
San Antonio Spurs	34	48	.415	18.0	20‍–‍21	14‍–‍27	5‍–‍11	82
New Orleans Pelicans	21	61	.256	31.0	14‍–‍27	7‍–‍34	3‍–‍13	82

==== By conference ====
Eastern Conference
#	Team	W	L	PCT	GB	GP
1	c – Cleveland Cavaliers *	64	18	.780	–	82
2	y – Boston Celtics *	61	21	.744	3.0	82
3	x – New York Knicks	51	31	.622	13.0	82
4	x – Indiana Pacers	50	32	.610	14.0	82
5	x – Milwaukee Bucks	48	34	.585	16.0	82
6	x – Detroit Pistons	44	38	.537	20.0	82
7	y – Orlando Magic *	41	41	.500	23.0	82
8	pi – Atlanta Hawks	40	42	.488	24.0	82
9	pi – Chicago Bulls	39	43	.476	25.0	82
10	x – Miami Heat	37	45	.451	27.0	82
11	Toronto Raptors	30	52	.366	34.0	82
12	Brooklyn Nets	26	56	.317	38.0	82
13	Philadelphia 76ers	24	58	.293	40.0	82
14	Charlotte Hornets	19	63	.232	45.0	82
15	Washington Wizards	18	64	.220	46.0	82

Western Conference
#	Team	W	L	PCT	GB	GP
1	z – Oklahoma City Thunder *	68	14	.829	–	82
2	y – Houston Rockets *	52	30	.634	16.0	82
3	y – Los Angeles Lakers *	50	32	.610	18.0	82
4	x – Denver Nuggets	50	32	.610	18.0	82
5	x – Los Angeles Clippers	50	32	.610	18.0	82
6	x – Minnesota Timberwolves	49	33	.598	19.0	82
7	x – Golden State Warriors	48	34	.585	20.0	82
8	x – Memphis Grizzlies	48	34	.585	20.0	82
9	pi – Sacramento Kings	40	42	.488	28.0	82
10	pi – Dallas Mavericks	39	43	.476	29.0	82
11	Phoenix Suns	36	46	.439	32.0	82
12	Portland Trail Blazers	36	46	.439	32.0	82
13	San Antonio Spurs	34	48	.415	34.0	82
14	New Orleans Pelicans	21	61	.256	47.0	82
15	Utah Jazz	17	65	.207	51.0	82

Notes

- z – Clinched home court advantage for the entire playoffs
- c – Clinched home court advantage for the conference playoffs
- y – Clinched division title
- pi – Clinched play-in tournament spot (locked into a play-in spot but not able to clinch a playoff spot directly)
- x – Clinched playoff spot
- * – Division leader

=== Postponed games due to the January 2025 Southern California wildfires ===
- January 9: Lakers vs. Hornets
- January 11: Lakers vs. Spurs and Clippers vs. Hornets

=== Postponed games due to other reasons ===
- January 11: Hawks vs. Rockets due to a winter storm in Atlanta
- January 22: Pelicans vs. Bucks due to a Gulf Coast blizzard

== Play-in tournament ==
The top six seeds in each conference advanced to the main rounds of the 2025 NBA playoffs, while the next four seeds participated in a Page playoff system tournament from April 15–18, 2025. In each conference: The 7th-place team hosted the 8th-place team in the double-chance round needing to win one game to advance, with the winner clinching the 7th seed in the playoffs. The 9th-place team hosted the 10th-place team in the elimination round requiring two wins to advance, with the loser being eliminated from the contention. The loser in the double-chance round hosted the elimination-round game-winner, with the winner clinching the 8th seed and the loser being eliminated.

=== Eastern Conference ===
Play-in games
7	Orlando*	120
8	Atlanta	95
9	Chicago	90
10	Miami	109

No. 8 seed game
8	Atlanta	114
10	Miami	123 (OT)

Final seeds
7	Orlando*	No. 7 seed
10	Miami	No. 8 seed

Bold Game winner
Italic Team with home-court advantage
* Division winner

=== Western Conference ===
Play-in games
7	Golden State	121
8	Memphis	116
9	Sacramento	106
10	Dallas	120

No. 8 seed game
8	Memphis	120
10	Dallas	106

Final seeds
7	Golden State	No. 7 seed
8	Memphis	No. 8 seed

Bold Game winner
Italic Team with home-court advantage

== Playoffs ==
The playoffs began on April 19, 2025.

=== Bracket ===
First round	Conference semifinals
E1	Cleveland*	4
E8	Miami	0
E1	Cleveland*	1
E4	Indiana	4
E4	Indiana	4
E5	Milwaukee	1
Eastern Conference
E3	New York	4
E6	Detroit	2
E3	New York	4
E2	Boston*	2
E2	Boston*	4
E7	Orlando*	1
W1	Oklahoma City*	4
W8	Memphis	0
W1	Oklahoma City*	4
W4	Denver	3
W4	Denver	4
W5	LA Clippers	3
Western Conference
W3	LA Lakers*	1
W6	Minnesota	4
W6	Minnesota	4
W7	Golden State	1
W2	Houston*	3
W7	Golden State	4

Conference finals
E4	Indiana	4
E3	New York	2
W1	Oklahoma City*	4
W6	Minnesota	1

NBA Finals
E4	Indiana	3
W1	Oklahoma City*	4

Bold Series winner
Italic Team with home-court advantage
* Division winner

== Statistics ==
=== Individual statistic leaders ===
Category	Player	Team(s)	Statistic
Points per game	Shai Gilgeous-Alexander	Oklahoma City Thunder	32.7
Rebounds per game	Domantas Sabonis	Sacramento Kings	13.9
Assists per game	Trae Young	Atlanta Hawks	11.6
Steals per game	Dyson Daniels	Atlanta Hawks	3.0
Blocks per game	Victor Wembanyama	San Antonio Spurs	3.8
Turnovers per game	Trae Young	Atlanta Hawks	4.7
Fouls per game	Jaren Jackson Jr. Karl-Anthony Towns	Memphis Grizzlies; New York Knicks	3.5
Minutes per game	Josh Hart	New York Knicks	37.6
FG%	Jarrett Allen	Cleveland Cavaliers	70.6
FT%	Stephen Curry	Golden State Warriors	93.3
3P%	Seth Curry	Charlotte Hornets	45.6
Efficiency per game	Nikola Jokić	Denver Nuggets	42.4
Double-doubles	Domantas Sabonis	Sacramento Kings	61
Triple-doubles	Nikola Jokić	Denver Nuggets	34

=== Individual game highs ===
Category	Player	Team	Statistic
Points	Nikola Jokić	Denver Nuggets	61
Rebounds	Domantas Sabonis (2x)	Sacramento Kings	28
Assists	Trae Young	Atlanta Hawks	22
Assists	Nikola Jokić	Denver Nuggets	22
Steals	Kelly Oubre Jr.	Philadelphia 76ers	8
Steals	Dyson Daniels	Atlanta Hawks	8
Steals	Josh Giddey	Chicago Bulls	8
Blocks	Victor Wembanyama	San Antonio Spurs	10
Three-pointers	Stephen Curry (2x)	Golden State Warriors	12

=== Team statistic leaders ===
Category	Team	Statistic
Points per game	Cleveland Cavaliers	121.9
Rebounds per game	Houston Rockets	48.5
Assists per game	Denver Nuggets	31.0
Steals per game	Oklahoma City Thunder	10.3
Blocks per game	Orlando Magic	6.0
Turnovers per game	Utah Jazz	17.2
Fouls per game	Toronto Raptors	21.2
FG%	Denver Nuggets	50.6
FT%	Oklahoma City Thunder	81.9
3P%	Milwaukee Bucks	38.7
+/−	Oklahoma City Thunder	+12.9

== Awards ==
=== Yearly awards ===
2024–25 NBA awards
Award	Recipient(s)	Finalists
Most Valuable Player	Shai Gilgeous-Alexander (Oklahoma City Thunder)	Giannis Antetokounmpo (Milwaukee Bucks); Nikola Jokić (Denver Nuggets)
Defensive Player of the Year	Evan Mobley (Cleveland Cavaliers)	Dyson Daniels (Atlanta Hawks); Draymond Green (Golden State Warriors)
Rookie of the Year	Stephon Castle (San Antonio Spurs)	Zaccharie Risacher (Atlanta Hawks); Jaylen Wells (Memphis Grizzlies)
Sixth Man of the Year	Payton Pritchard (Boston Celtics)	Malik Beasley (Detroit Pistons); Ty Jerome (Cleveland Cavaliers)
Most Improved Player	Dyson Daniels (Atlanta Hawks)	Cade Cunningham (Detroit Pistons); Ivica Zubac (Los Angeles Clippers)
Clutch Player of the Year	Jalen Brunson (New York Knicks)	Anthony Edwards (Minnesota Timberwolves); Nikola Jokić (Denver Nuggets)
Coach of the Year	Kenny Atkinson (Cleveland Cavaliers)	J. B. Bickerstaff (Detroit Pistons); Ime Udoka (Houston Rockets)
Executive of the Year	Sam Presti (Oklahoma City Thunder)	
NBA Sportsmanship Award	Jrue Holiday (Boston Celtics)	
Twyman–Stokes Teammate of the Year Award	Stephen Curry (Golden State Warriors)	
Community Assist Award		
Kareem Abdul-Jabbar Social Justice Champion Award	Jrue Holiday (Boston Celtics)	Bam Adebayo (Miami Heat); Harrison Barnes (San Antonio Spurs); Chris Boucher (Toronto Raptors); CJ McCollum (New Orleans Pelicans)
NBA Hustle Award	Draymond Green (Golden State Warriors)	

- All-NBA First Team:
  - F Giannis Antetokounmpo, Milwaukee Bucks
  - F Jayson Tatum, Boston Celtics
  - C Nikola Jokić, Denver Nuggets
  - G Shai Gilgeous-Alexander, Oklahoma City Thunder
  - G Donovan Mitchell, Cleveland Cavaliers
- All-NBA Second Team:
  - F LeBron James, Los Angeles Lakers
  - F Evan Mobley, Cleveland Cavaliers
  - G Jalen Brunson, New York Knicks
  - G Stephen Curry, Golden State Warriors
  - G Anthony Edwards, Minnesota Timberwolves
- All-NBA Third Team:
  - F Karl-Anthony Towns, New York Knicks
  - F Jalen Williams, Oklahoma City Thunder
  - G Cade Cunningham, Detroit Pistons
  - G Tyrese Haliburton, Indiana Pacers
  - G James Harden, Los Angeles Clippers

- NBA All-Defensive First Team:
  - F Draymond Green, Golden State Warriors
  - F Amen Thompson, Houston Rockets
  - C Evan Mobley, Cleveland Cavaliers
  - G Dyson Daniels, Atlanta Hawks
  - G Luguentz Dort, Oklahoma City Thunder
- NBA All-Defensive Second Team:
  - F Toumani Camara, Portland Trail Blazers
  - F Jaren Jackson Jr., Memphis Grizzlies
  - F Jalen Williams, Oklahoma City Thunder
  - C Rudy Gobert, Minnesota Timberwolves
  - C Ivica Zubac, Los Angeles Clippers

- NBA All-Rookie First Team:
  - Stephon Castle, San Antonio Spurs
  - Zaccharie Risacher, Atlanta Hawks
  - Jaylen Wells, Memphis Grizzlies
  - Zach Edey, Memphis Grizzlies
  - Alex Sarr, Washington Wizards
- NBA All-Rookie Second Team:
  - Matas Buzelis, Chicago Bulls
  - Bub Carrington, Washington Wizards
  - Donovan Clingan, Portland Trail Blazers
  - Kel'el Ware, Miami Heat
  - Yves Missi, New Orleans Pelicans

=== Players of the Week ===
The following players were named the Eastern and Western Conference Players of the Week.

Week	Eastern Conference	Western Conference	Ref
October 22–27	Jayson Tatum (Boston Celtics) (1/2)	Anthony Davis (Los Angeles Lakers) (1/1)	
October 28 – November 3	Donovan Mitchell (Cleveland Cavaliers) (1/2)	Devin Booker (Phoenix Suns) (1/1)	
November 4–10	Darius Garland (Cleveland Cavaliers) (1/2)	Nikola Jokić (Denver Nuggets) (1/3)	
November 11–17	Franz Wagner (Orlando Magic) (1/1)	De'Aaron Fox (Sacramento Kings) (1/1)	
November 18–24	Giannis Antetokounmpo (Milwaukee Bucks) (1/4)	Harrison Barnes (San Antonio Spurs) (1/1)	
November 25 – December 1	Jalen Brunson (New York Knicks) (1/2)	Alperen Şengün (Houston Rockets) (1/1)	
December 2–8	Tyler Herro (Miami Heat) (1/1)	Luka Dončić (Dallas Mavericks) (1/1)	
December 16–22	Cade Cunningham (Detroit Pistons) (1/1)	Victor Wembanyama (San Antonio Spurs) (1/1)	
December 23–29	Tyrese Maxey (Philadelphia 76ers) (1/1)	Shai Gilgeous-Alexander (Oklahoma City Thunder) (1/2)	
December 30 – January 5	Jayson Tatum (Boston Celtics) (2/2)	Nikola Jokić (Denver Nuggets) (2/3)	
January 6–12	Darius Garland (Cleveland Cavaliers) (2/2)	Domantas Sabonis (Sacramento Kings) (1/1)	
January 13–19	Giannis Antetokounmpo (Milwaukee Bucks) (2/4)	Jalen Green (Houston Rockets) (1/2)	
January 20–26	Scottie Barnes (Toronto Raptors) (1/1)	Jaren Jackson Jr. (Memphis Grizzlies) (1/1)	
January 27 – February 2	Donovan Mitchell (Cleveland Cavaliers) (2/2)	LeBron James (Los Angeles Lakers) (1/1)	
February 3–9	Trae Young (Atlanta Hawks) (1/2)	Nikola Jokić (Denver Nuggets) (3/3)	
February 24 – March 2	Jalen Brunson (New York Knicks) (2/2)	Zach LaVine (Sacramento Kings) (1/1)	
March 3–9	Trae Young (Atlanta Hawks) (2/2)	Shai Gilgeous-Alexander (Oklahoma City Thunder) (2/2)	
March 10–16	Coby White (Chicago Bulls) (1/2)	Anthony Edwards (Minnesota Timberwolves) (1/1)	
March 17–23	Coby White (Chicago Bulls) (2/2)	Kevin Durant (Phoenix Suns) (1/1)	
March 24–30	Paolo Banchero (Orlando Magic) (1/1)	Jalen Green (Houston Rockets) (2/2)	
March 31 – April 6	Giannis Antetokounmpo (Milwaukee Bucks) (3/4)	Kawhi Leonard (Los Angeles Clippers) (1/1)	
April 7–13	Giannis Antetokounmpo (Milwaukee Bucks) (4/4)	James Harden (Los Angeles Clippers) (1/1)	

=== Players of the Month ===
The following players were named the Eastern and Western Conference Players of the Month.

Month	Eastern Conference	Western Conference	Ref
October/November	Jayson Tatum (Boston Celtics) (1/1)	Shai Gilgeous-Alexander (Oklahoma City Thunder) (1/3)	
December	Karl-Anthony Towns (New York Knicks) (1/1)	Shai Gilgeous-Alexander (Oklahoma City Thunder) (2/3)	
January	Giannis Antetokounmpo (Milwaukee Bucks) (1/1)	Nikola Jokić (Denver Nuggets) (1/1)	
February	Donovan Mitchell (Cleveland Cavaliers) (1/1)	LeBron James (Los Angeles Lakers) (1/1)	
March	Coby White (Chicago Bulls) (1/1)	Shai Gilgeous-Alexander (Oklahoma City Thunder) (3/3)	

=== Defensive Players of the Month ===
The following players were named the Eastern and Western Conference Defensive Players of the Month.

Month	Eastern Conference	Western Conference	Ref
October/November	Dyson Daniels (Atlanta Hawks) (1/2)	Victor Wembanyama (San Antonio Spurs) (1/1)	
December	Evan Mobley (Cleveland Cavaliers) (1/2)	Jaren Jackson Jr. (Memphis Grizzlies) (1/1)	
January	Andrew Nembhard (Indiana Pacers) (1/1)	Amen Thompson (Houston Rockets) (1/1)	
February	Evan Mobley (Cleveland Cavaliers) (2/2)	Toumani Camara (Portland Trail Blazers) (1/1)	
March	Dyson Daniels (Atlanta Hawks) (2/2)	Draymond Green (Golden State Warriors) (1/1)	

=== Rookies of the Month ===
The following players were named the Eastern and Western Conference Rookies of the Month.

Month	Eastern Conference	Western Conference	Ref
October/November	Jared McCain (Philadelphia 76ers) (1/1)	Jaylen Wells (Memphis Grizzlies) (1/1)	
December	Alex Sarr (Washington Wizards) (1/1)	Yves Missi (New Orleans Pelicans) (1/1)	
January	Kel'el Ware (Miami Heat) (1/1)	Stephon Castle (San Antonio Spurs) (1/2)	
February	Zaccharie Risacher (Atlanta Hawks) (1/2)	Isaiah Collier (Utah Jazz) (1/1)	
March	Zaccharie Risacher (Atlanta Hawks) (2/2)	Stephon Castle (San Antonio Spurs) (2/2)	

=== Coaches of the Month ===
The following coaches were named the Eastern and Western Conference Coaches of the Month.

Month	Eastern Conference	Western Conference	Ref
October/November	Kenny Atkinson (Cleveland Cavaliers) (1/2)	Ime Udoka (Houston Rockets) (1/2)	
December	Kenny Atkinson (Cleveland Cavaliers) (2/2)	Mark Daigneault (Oklahoma City Thunder) (1/3)	
January	Rick Carlisle (Indiana Pacers) (1/1)	Ime Udoka (Houston Rockets) (2/2)	
February	J. B. Bickerstaff (Detroit Pistons) (1/1)	Mark Daigneault (Oklahoma City Thunder) (2/3)	
March	Joe Mazzulla (Boston Celtics) (1/1)	Mark Daigneault (Oklahoma City Thunder) (3/3)	

== Arena changes ==
- The Los Angeles Clippers have moved to the new Intuit Dome in Inglewood, California. The team played at the Crypto.com Arena for the past 25 years in Downtown Los Angeles, California, since the 1999–2000 NBA season. As a result, for the first time since the 1998–99 NBA season, every team will have their own home venue.
- Rocket Mortgage FieldHouse, the home of the Cleveland Cavaliers, was renamed Rocket Arena on February 18, 2025, as part of the company's rebranding.
- Footprint Center, the home of the Phoenix Suns, was temporarily renamed PHX Arena on February 18, 2025, after the Suns announced that they were seeking a new naming rights partner.

== Uniform and logo changes ==
- The Brooklyn Nets promoted their secondary logo to their primary and introduced a new secondary logo.
- The Los Angeles Clippers unveiled a new logo and uniforms to coincide with their move to Intuit Dome. The team's new logo features a stylized clipper ship with basketball seams on its hull, surrounded by points of a compass and a navy blue "C" in a white circle. The new uniforms are modern versions of the script uniforms previously worn between 1987 and 2015. The white uniform features a "Clippers" modernized script wordmark in navy blue along with red numbers, the navy blue uniform features the "Clippers" script in red along with white numbers, and the alternative red uniform features a "Los Angeles" script wordmark in navy blue along with white numbers.
- The Golden State Warriors unveiled a new secondary logo and "Statement" uniform.
- The Toronto Raptors unveiled a logo to commemorate their 30th anniversary.
- The Memphis Grizzlies unveiled a logo and classic uniforms to commemorate their 30th anniversary.
- The Utah Jazz began a two-season long transition to a modernized version of their 1996–2004 uniforms, with new "City" and "Statement" uniforms debuting this season, and new "Association" and "Icon Edition" uniforms debuting next season.
- The Washington Wizards have a new "Statement" uniform, with the phrase "The District of Columbia" on the front of the jersey.

== Media ==
=== National ===
==== Linear television ====
This was the ninth and final season of a nine-year deal with the ESPN family of networks and TNT Sports, before new 11-year deals with ESPN/ABC, NBC/Peacock and Amazon Prime Video begin in 2025–26. TNT, in its final year of NBA coverage, has aired live NBA games since 1989. The NBA rejected TNT Sports' matching rights offer for Amazon's package, claiming TNT was unable to fully match the terms of Amazon's all-streaming contract. TNT then filed a lawsuit against the league in a Manhattan New York state court, seeking to delay the new media deals from taking effect and to rule that TNT's offer matched Amazon's deal. In November, the two parties agreed to a settlement, with TNT acquiring live game rights in selected international territories, and entering into a separate sublicensing agreement with The Walt Disney Company (parent company of ESPN and ABC) to broadcast TNT's Inside the NBA studio on ESPN/ABC in 2025–26. TNT Sports later announced in June 2025 that it would no longer operate NBA's digital properties, including NBA TV and the NBA.com website, effective October 1.

TNT generally aired games on Tuesday nights during most of the regular season, Thursday nights during opening week and after the NBA Cup, and a Monday Doubleheader on March 31; simulcasts or alternative broadcasts of selected TNT's games were on TruTV. ESPN continued to air games on Wednesday and Friday nights, with a limited selection of games on other days as the schedule allowed. ABC aired NBA Saturday Primetime games on eight Saturdays between December and March (including a tripleheader on January 25), and NBA Sunday Showcase games on five Sunday afternoons (including three doubleheaders) in February and March. NBA TV televised games when the other national broadcasters were not airing games; most of NBA TV's games simulcast local coverage (subject to blackout restrictions in the local markets of the teams playing), but select games were produced by NBA TV as part of its NBA Center Court package of games.

During the NBA Cup, TNT aired the group stage as part of its Tuesday night coverage, along with three quarterfinals and one semifinal. ESPN then aired group stage matches as part of its Friday night coverage, along with one quarterfinal. And ABC aired one semifinal and the final of the NBA Cup in primetime.

Of the five Christmas games that were scheduled, only the middle three games were originally planned to be simulcast on ESPN and ABC, with the first and last contests only on ESPN. However, in October 2024, it was announced that all five games would be ABC/ESPN simulcasts like in 2022. ESPN2 also aired an alternate broadcast of the first Christmas game featuring a live animated version of the game featuring Mickey Mouse universe characters.

Of the four Martin Luther King Jr. Day games that were scheduled, NBA TV had the first and last contests, and TNT broadcast the two middle games.

On February 5, ESPN announced that it had flexed Luka Dončić's expected LA Lakers debut on February 8 (the previous night's Utah vs Phoenix game was flexed out of national television due to this), but after he did not play due to injury the network then flexed the Lakers' next game on February 10 (it was later announced that the Sacramento vs LA Clippers game on March 9 was flexed out due to this).

TNT had exclusive coverage of NBA All-Star Weekend, except for the Celebrity Game which aired on ESPN.

On the final day of the regular season, Sunday, April 13, two games with playoff implications were flexed into ESPN's afternoon doubleheader.

==== Streaming ====
ESPN+ began streaming ABC's games this season, including the network's two NBA Cup games, NBA Saturday Primetime, and NBA Sunday Showcase. Both ESPN+ and Disney+ streamed the Mickey Mouse-themed alternate Christmas broadcast, the traditional broadcasts of all five Christmas games., Luka Dončić's LA Lakers debut on February 10, the NBA All-Star Celebrity Game and a Saturday Primetime game on March 8.

This was the second and final season that the streaming service Max have live access to TNT's games. Meanwhile, NBA League Pass continued to offer out-of-market games, live access to NBA TV, and on-demand replays of every game.

=== Local ===
The Chicago Bulls, the NHL's Chicago Blackhawks, MLB's Chicago White Sox, and Standard Media launched the Chicago Sports Network prior to the start of this season, replacing NBC Sports Chicago as their regional broadcaster.

The Portland Trail Blazers and Root Sports mutually agreed to end their television agreement prior to the season. On September 23, 2024, the Trail Blazers announced that they had signed a multi-year agreement with Sinclair Broadcast Group to be their new broadcaster. Under the deal, KATU and KUNP were named as the flagship stations, the group of over-the-air stations carrying games across the team's broadcast territory was branded as the Rip City Television Network, and games stream locally on a new direct-to-consumer streaming service named BlazerVision.

Altitude Sports and Entertainment, the television home of the Denver Nuggets, reached an agreement with Tegna Inc. to simulcast 20 games on KTVD in Denver. Select games are being simulcast on KUSA.

This is the first season that the Gotham Sports App, owned by a joint venture between MSG Networks and YES Network, became the exclusive streaming home of the Knicks and Nets. The app will not change the television rights for these teams.

==== Diamond Sports Group bankruptcy ====
Diamond Sports Group, the parent company of the regional sports network chain FanDuel Sports Network (formerly Bally Sports), has been under Chapter 11 bankruptcy protection since March 2023. As part of the bankruptcy, on August 23, 2024, Diamond Sports signed a long-term agreement with thirteen of the NBA teams that it holds rights to, committing to broadcast their games through at least the 2024–25 season, but with a 30 to 40 percent reduction in their rights fees. Despite being a long-term deal, if Diamond Sports is unable to get a bankruptcy plan approved by the court, the agreement will expire following the end of the season.

Diamond also terminated its contracts with the Dallas Mavericks and New Orleans Pelicans, and both teams would sign with over-the-air broadcasters. The Mavericks signed a multi-year agreement with Tegna Inc. as their broadcaster, with KFAA (formerly KMPX) and WFAA as flagship stations. Meanwhile, the Pelicans announced a new agreement with Gray Television, under which games will be broadcast by the new Gulf Coast Sports & Entertainment Network, with WVUE-DT in New Orleans as flagship.

On October 21, Bally Sports rebranded as FanDuel Sports Network, after Diamond ended its sponsorship agreements with Bally's Corporation and entered into a new agreement with online gambling company FanDuel Group.

Along with airing on FanDuel Sports Network, the Bucks, Cavaliers, Grizzlies, Hawks, Hornets, Pacers, Pistons, Thunder and Timberwolves also announced agreements to simulcast five games on local over-the-air networks. The Bucks will air games on Weigel Broadcasting-owned WMLW-TV (in English) and WYTU-LD (in Spanish). The Cavaliers will air games on Gray Media-owned Rock Entertainment Sports Network and WUAB. The Grizzlies will air games on Gray Media-owned WMC-TV, WSMV-TV and WBXX-TV. The Hawks will air games on Gray Media owned-WPCH-TV and Peachtree Sports Network. The Hornets will air games on Cox Media Group-owned WSOC-TV and WAXN-TV, Gray Media-owned WIS-TV, WCSC-TV, WMBF-TV, WHNS, WITN-DT2 and WECT-DT2, and Capitol Broadcasting Company-owned WRAZ-DT2. The Pacers will air games on Tegna Inc.-owned WTHR. The Pistons will air games on E. W. Scripps Company-owned WMYD. The Thunder will air games on Griffin Media-owned KWTV-DT or KSBI (in Oklahoma City) and KOTV-DT or KQCW-DT (in Tulsa). The Timberwolves will air games on Tegna Inc. owned KARE.

On January 2, 2025, Diamond emerged from Chapter 11 bankruptcy and rebranded themselves as the Main Street Sports Group.

=== Personnel ===
ESPN analyst JJ Redick left the network to became head coach of the Los Angeles Lakers. He was initially replaced by a cast of rotating analysts joining Mike Breen and Doris Burke on the network's lead announce team. On February 24, ESPN announced that Richard Jefferson will remain with Breen and Burke for the rest of the season.

ESPN analyst Hubie Brown announced his retirement at the end of the season. Brown has called games for ESPN since 2004 and previously called games for USA Network, CBS and TNT. He called his last game on February 9, 2025, during the 76ers–Bucks game.

The Boston Celtics promoted backup TV play-by-play announcer Drew Carter to full time this season following the retirement of Mike Gorman. Carter was hired by the team soon after Gorman announced his retirement prior to the start of 2023–24; Gorman primarily called Celtics home games during his final season while Carter primarily called away games.

The San Antonio Spurs hired Jacob Tobey to be their new TV play-by-play announcer this season following the retirement of Bill Land. Tobey previously held play-by-play roles with Fox Sports and the Pac-12 Network.

The Philadelphia 76ers home game on March 3, as well as the Boston Celtics home game on March 5, was called by Mike Tirico, in preparation for his new role as the lead play-by-play announcer on NBC next season. These games marked the first time Tirico called NBA games since the 2015–16 season, while at ESPN.

== Attendances ==
The average attendance was 18,147. The 2023–24 NBA teams by average home attendance:

#	NBA team	Total attendance	Home games	Average attendance
1	Chicago Bulls	825,659	41	20,138
2	Dallas Mavericks	803,174	40	20,079
3	Philadelphia 76ers	813,621	41	19,846
4	New York Knicks	811,794	41	19,799
5	Denver Nuggets	811,211	41	19,783
6	Miami Heat	808,337	41	19,715
7	Cleveland Cavaliers	796,712	41	19,433
8	Boston Celtics	785,396	41	19,158
9	Detroit Pistons	781,929	41	19,071
10	Minnesota Timberwolves	772,249	41	18,833
11	Toronto Raptors	768,573	41	18,744
12	Los Angeles Lakers	767,626	41	18,724
13	Orlando Magic	762,121	41	18,587
14	Utah Jazz	745,175	41	18,174
15	Golden State Warriors	740,624	41	18,061
16	Oklahoma City Thunder	754,832	42	17,972
17	San Antonio Spurs	731,474	41	17,837
18	Portland Trail Blazers	719,369	41	17,542
19	Houston Rockets	716,853	41	17,482
20	Milwaukee Bucks	732,014	42	17,429
21	Brooklyn Nets	713,304	41	17,395
22	Charlotte Hornets	703,935	41	17,169
23	Phoenix Suns	699,911	41	17,072
24	New Orleans Pelicans	689,400	41	16,815
25	Indiana Pacers	685,434	41	16,718
26	Memphis Grizzlies	683,067	41	16,660
27	Sacramento Kings	679,565	41	16,575
28	Los Angeles Clippers	679,220	41	16,568
29	Atlanta Hawks	657,613	40	16,440
30	Washington Wizards	663,691	41	16,191

== Notable occurrences ==
- On June 27, 2024, Bronny James was selected 55th overall in the 2nd round of the 2024 NBA draft by the Los Angeles Lakers. Being the son of current Lakers player LeBron James, they marked the first father-son duo to play together in league history.
  - They would officially make their regular season debut together on October 22, 2024, in a win against the Minnesota Timberwolves.
- On July 1, 2024, Jayson Tatum signed a five-year, $314 million contract extension with the Boston Celtics, the largest in league history.
- The NBA cut the average back-to-back regular season games per team by 23 percent to help curb "load management", when teams rest more than one healthy star player on any night. Teams no longer play four games in five nights, eight games in 12 nights, nor play on the day before or after "high-profile" nationally televised games.
- For the third consecutive season, the league did not schedule regular season games on Election Day in the United States, which fell on November 5 in 2024.
- On October 22, 2024, the Boston Celtics tied the record for the most three-pointers made in a single game with 29 in a win over the New York Knicks.
- On October 22, 2024, LeBron James passed Kobe Bryant for the most field goals missed in NBA history.
- On October 25, 2024, the Golden State Warriors became the first team in NBA history to open their season with two wins by at least 35 points.
- On October 25, 2024, LeBron James became the first to record a triple-double in his 22nd season.
- On October 26, 2024, LeBron James became the oldest player, aged 39 years, 301 days, to lead both teams in points, rebounds, and assists in a game.
- On October 28, 2024, Kevin Durant became the 8th player to score 29,000 points.
- On October 31, 2024, Victor Wembanyama became the 3rd player with multiple five-by-fives.
- On November 6, 2024, Kenny Atkinson set the record for the most wins to start a coach's first season with a new team with 9, with the Cleveland Cavaliers' win over the New Orleans Pelicans. The record was extended to 15 on November 17, 2024, with a victory over the Charlotte Hornets.
- On November 8, 2024, the Cleveland Cavaliers became the first team in NBA history to win their first ten games while scoring at least 110 points in each game.
- On November 9, 2024, Victor Wembanyama became the first player in NBA history to have multiple games with at least 20 points, 5 three-pointers, 15 rebounds, and 5 blocks.
- On November 13, 2024, LeBron James became the oldest player, aged 39 years, 319 days, to record three consecutive triple-doubles.
- On November 13, 2024, Chris Paul became the third player to record 12,000 assists.
- On November 17, 2024, James Harden passed Ray Allen for 2nd on the league's all-time three-pointers made list.
- On November 19, 2024, the Boston Celtics ended the Cleveland Cavaliers' 15-game winning streak with a 120–117 victory. The 2024–25 Cavaliers tied the 1948–49 Washington Capitols and the 1993–94 Houston Rockets for having the second-longest winning streak to start a season.
- On November 19, 2024, Dalton Knecht tied the league record for the most three-pointers by a rookie in a single game, with nine.
- On November 29, 2024, Zach LaVine passed Kirk Hinrich to become the all-time leader in three-pointers made in Bulls franchise history.
- On December 1, 2024, James Harden became the second player to reach 3,000 three-pointers.
- On December 5, 2024, Nikola Jokić passed Magic Johnson for third place in career triple-doubles.
- On December 8, 2024, Chris Paul passed Jason Kidd for second place in career assists.
- On December 13, 2024, both the Phoenix Suns and Utah Jazz broke the record for the most three-pointers made in a non-overtime game, as well as tied the record for the most three-pointers made in single game with 44 made three-pointers between the two teams (22 made by both squads) in Phoenix's 134–126 win over Utah.
- On December 13, 2024, both the Charlotte Hornets and Chicago Bulls broke the record for the most three-pointers missed in a game between two teams with 75 total missed three-pointers by both squads (38 missed attempted by the Hornets, 37 missed attempts by the Bulls) in Chicago's 109–95 win over Charlotte. Coincidentally, the two teams would tie the record two weeks later on December 30, with Chicago missing 42 total three-point field goal attempts and Charlotte missing 33 three-point field goal shots this time around in the Bulls' 117–108 overtime win over the Hornets.
- On December 15, 2024, the Dallas Mavericks and Golden State Warriors broke the record for most three-pointers made by both teams in a game with 48 (27 by the Warriors and 21 by the Mavericks) in Dallas' 143–133 win over Golden State.
- On December 19, 2024, LeBron James passed Kareem Abdul-Jabbar for the most regular-season minutes played in NBA history.
- On December 31, 2024, LeBron James became the first player in NBA history to play in the league both as a teenager and during his forties.
- On January 3, 2025, LeBron James passed Michael Jordan for the most 30-point games in NBA history, with his 563rd game.
- On January 8, 2025, the Cleveland Cavaliers, entering with a 10-game winning streak, played the visiting Oklahoma City Thunder, who had a longer streak of 15 games. This marked the first time a team with a 10-game winning streak and a team with a 15-game winning streak played each other. The Cavaliers won the game 129–122, marking the Thunder's only loss to the Eastern Conference this season; the Thunder eventually finished 29–1 against Eastern Conference teams.
- On January 10, 2025, Nikola Jokić and Russell Westbrook became the first teammates to have triple-doubles in the same game multiple times in the same season.
- On February 1, 2025, LeBron James became the first player to have multiple triple-doubles at the age of 40.
- On February 2nd, 2025, Luka Dončić was traded to the Los Angeles Lakers in a deal that most notably sent Anthony Davis to the Dallas Mavericks.
- On February 3, 2025, Devin Booker surpassed Walter Davis to become the all-time leading scorer in Suns franchise history.
- On February 6, 2025, LeBron James became the oldest player, aged 40 years, 38 days, to score 40 points in a game with a 42-point performance against the Golden State Warriors.
- On February 11, 2025, Kevin Durant became the eighth player to score 30,000 points.
- On February 25, 2025, Luka Dončić recorded a triple-double in a win against his previous team, the Dallas Mavericks, becoming the 4th player to have a triple-double in the first game against their old team and one of three (LeBron James and Russell Westbrook) players to have a triple-double against all 30 NBA teams.
- On March 3, 2025, LeBron James became the fourth player to record 1,000 regular season wins with a 108–102 victory over the Los Angeles Clippers.
- On March 4, 2025, LeBron James became the first player with 50,000 combined points in the regular season and playoffs.
- On March 5, 2025, Payton Pritchard and Derrick White became the first teammates to each make 9 or more three-pointers in the same game.
- On March 7, 2025, Nikola Jokić became the first player with at least 30 points, 20 rebounds, and 20 assists in a game.
- On March 8, 2025, Stephen Curry became the 26th player to score 25,000 points.
- On March 13, 2025, Stephen Curry became the first player to make 4,000 career three-pointers.
- On March 19, 2025, Sandro Mamukelashvili became the first player in NBA history to score 34 points while playing less than 20 minutes.
- On March 20, 2025, DeMar DeRozan became the 27th player to score 25,000 points.
- On March 23, 2025, Dyson Daniels became the youngest player with 200 or more steals in a season. He also became the first player since Chris Paul in 2008–09 to reach that mark.
- On March 28, 2025, the Detroit Pistons secured their first winning season since 2016. They also became the second team in NBA history to triple their win total from the previous season, joining the 2012–13 Charlotte Bobcats, and the first to do so from the previous full season.
- On March 31, 2025, in a game against the Charlotte Hornets, the Utah Jazz, who previously hadn't lost 60 or more games in franchise history, suffered their 60th loss of the season, making them the last remaining team in league history to lose at least 60 games in a season.
- On March 31, 2025, a brawl broke out between the Detroit Pistons and Minnesota Timberwolves, with five players and two coaches ejected. The five players were issued suspensions.
- On April 1, 2025, Nikola Jokić put up a triple-double of 61 points, 10 rebounds, and 10 assists, the highest-scoring triple-double in NBA history.
- On April 2, 2025, the Oklahoma City Thunder defeated the Detroit Pistons 119–103 for their 29th win against the Eastern Conference this season. With the win, they are 29–1 against teams from the Eastern Conference, the best in league history.
- On April 4, 2025, the Boston Celtics set the record for most three-pointers in a season with their 1,364th three-pointer by Payton Pritchard in a game against the Phoenix Suns. The previous record was held by the 2022–23 Golden State Warriors.
- On April 8, 2025, the Oklahoma City Thunder set the record for most double-digit wins in a season with 51, surpassing the previous mark of 50 set by the 1971–72 Los Angeles Lakers.
- On April 9, 2025, LeBron James passed Kareem Abdul-Jabbar for 2nd on the league's regular season games played list, with 1,561.
- On April 11, 2025, Nikola Jokić became the third player in NBA history to average a triple-double in a season, joining Oscar Robertson and Russell Westbrook
- On April 13, 2025, Chris Paul became the first player to start all 82 games for his team in his 20th season or later.
- The Oklahoma City Thunder set the record for highest scoring differential in a season, with +12.9. The previous record of +12.3 was set by the 1971–72 Los Angeles Lakers.
- Jarrett Allen became the first player to shoot 70% from the field and 70% from the free throw line in a season.
