= WVVH-CD =

Television station in Southampton, New York

- Southampton, New York; United States
- Channels: Digital: 18 (UHF); Virtual: 18
- Branding: Hamptons Television

Programming
- Affiliations: 18.1: YTA TV; for others, see § Subchannels

Ownership
- Owner: Greg and Ernie Schmizzi; (Video Voice, Inc.)

History
- Founded: October 13, 1983
- First air date: 1988
- Former call signs: W23AA (1983–1994); WVVH-LP (1994–2008); WVVH-CA (2008–2011)
- Former channel numbers: Analog: 23 (UHF, 1994–2001), 50 (UHF, 2001–2011); Digital: 50 (UHF, 2011–2020)
- Former affiliations: Channel America (1988–1996); America One (1996–2015); Omni Broadcasting Network (2003); Outside TV (secondary, ????–20??)
- Call sign meaning: "The Video Voice of the Hamptons"

Technical information
- Licensing authority: FCC
- Facility ID: 70158
- Class: CD
- ERP: 15 kW
- HAAT: 143.1 m (469 ft)
- Transmitter coordinates: 40°58′10.8″N 72°20′46.6″W

Links
- Public license information: Public file; LMS
- Website: www.wvvh.com

WVVH-CD (channel 18) is a low-power Class A television station in Southampton, New York, United States. The station is owned by Greg and Ernie Schmizzi, doing business as Video Voice, Inc., and runs programming from YTA TV and Outside TV. WVVH-CD's studios are located in East Hampton, and its transmitter is located in Sag Harbor, New York.

== History ==
The station was founded in 1983, but it signed on as an affiliate of Channel America in 1988. Brothers Greg and Ernie Schimizzi, doing business as Video Voice, brought W23AA from David Post changing the call sign to WVVH-LP on October 4, 1994. In 2001, WVVH-LP moved to channel 50 since WFTY (channel 67) would be broadcasting its digital signal on channel 23 and could potentially cause interference to WVVH. In 2003, the station signed to become an affiliate of the Omni Broadcasting Network.

In 2004, the station began streaming its programming online.

On November 15, 2005, the station applied for a construction permit to begin digital broadcasting on its existing channel 50.

In 2007, a consortium from its home base in the Hamptons, acquired Resort Sports Network with an eye towards expanding the network's shows with broadcasts from WVVH about the lifestyle options at resorts.

The station changed its call letters to WVVH-CA on April 15, 2008, this reflected its change from a low-power (LP) station to a Class A station (CA). The station changed its call sign again on October 21, 2011, to the current WVVH-CD.

== Programming ==
In addition to its network programming, WVVH-CD also shows local programming, such as the Hampton Classic Horse Show, Hamptons International Film Festival, and the Bridgehampton Road Rally, as well as the talk show In The Mixx, which premiered in summer 2012. At one time, WVVH maintained a local newscast, but eventually began carrying INN News. WVVH also carried the syndicated The Daily Buzz program on weekday mornings.

== Subchannels ==
The station's signal is multiplexed:

Subchannels of WVVH-CD
| Subchannel | Res. | Short name | Programming |
|---|---|---|---|
| 18.1 | 720p | WVVH-DT | YTA TV |
| 18.2 | 480i | WVVH-DT | YTA TV |
| 18.3 | 480i | SHOP LC | Shop LC |
| 18.4 | 480i | JTV | Jewelry TV |
| 18.5 | 480i | NTD-TV | NTD America |
