= Nurse TV (Australia) =

Nurse TV is an Australian community television project which has been in production since 2003. To date over 70 episodes about Australia's nursing profession have been produced.
