= NBA Clutch Player of the Year =

National Basketball Association award

- Sport: Basketball
- League: National Basketball Association
- Awarded for: NBA player who performs the best at the end of close games.

History
- First award: 2022–23
- Most recent: Shai Gilgeous-Alexander, Oklahoma City Thunder (2026)

The NBA Clutch Player of the Year is an award given to a National Basketball Association (NBA) player who "best comes through for his teammates in the clutch" in the regular season. The winner receives the Jerry West Trophy. The trophy is named after Jerry West, who had a reputation of being a clutch player when he played for the Los Angeles Lakers for his entire career from 1960 to 1974. The award debuted for the 2022–23 season, and players are voted on by a media panel based on nominations from NBA head coaches.

De'Aaron Fox won the inaugural award in 2023.

== Winners ==
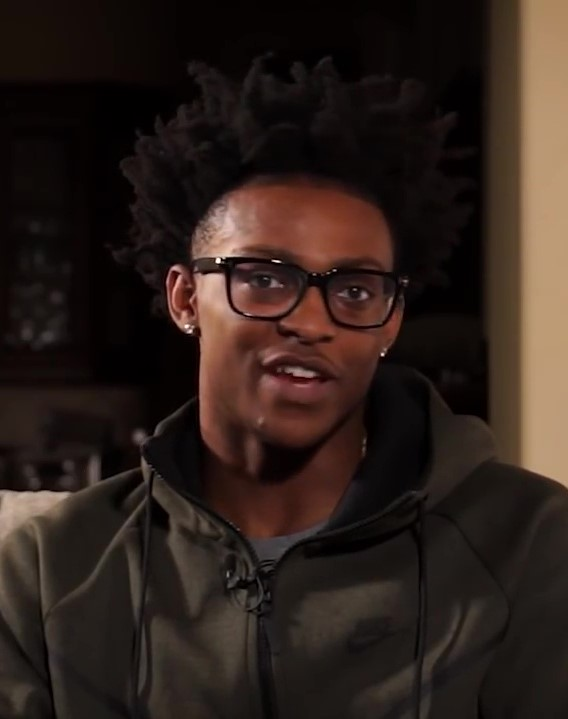
De'Aaron Fox was the award's inaugural recipient.

^	Denotes player who is still active in the NBA
*	Elected to the Naismith Memorial Basketball Hall of Fame

Season	Player	Position	Nationality	Team
2022–23	De'Aaron Fox^	Point guard	United States	Sacramento Kings
2023–24	Stephen Curry^	Point guard	United States	Golden State Warriors
2024–25	Jalen Brunson^	Point guard	United States	New York Knicks
2025–26	Shai Gilgeous-Alexander^	Point guard	Canada	Oklahoma City Thunder

== Teams ==
Awards	Team(s)	Years
1	Sacramento Kings	2023
1	Golden State Warriors	2024
1	New York Knicks	2025
1	Oklahoma City Thunder	2026

== See also ==
- List of NBA regular season records
