= De'Aaron Fox =

American basketball player (born 1997)

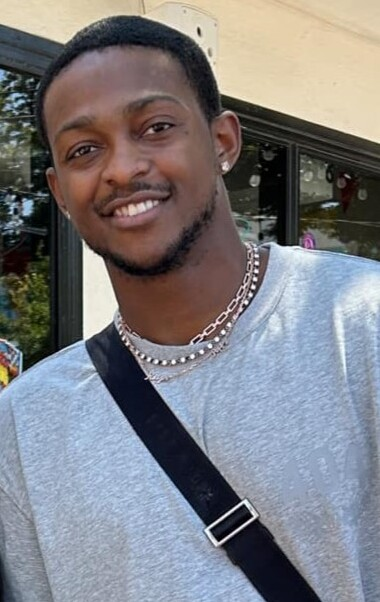
- Fox in 2024

No. 4 – San Antonio Spurs
- Position: Point guard
- League: NBA

Personal information
- Born: December 20, 1997 (age 28) New Orleans, Louisiana, U.S.
- Listed height: 6 ft 3 in (1.91 m)
- Listed weight: 185 lb (84 kg)

Career information
- High school: Cypress Lakes (Cypress, Texas)
- College: Kentucky (2016–2017)
- NBA draft: 2017: 1st round, 5th overall pick
- Drafted by: Sacramento Kings
- Playing career: 2017–present

Career history
- 2017–2025: Sacramento Kings
- 2025–present: San Antonio Spurs

Career highlights
- 2× NBA All-Star (2023, 2026); All-NBA Third Team (2023); NBA steals leader (2024); First-team All-SEC (2017); SEC All-Freshman Team (2017); SEC tournament MVP (2017); McDonald's All-American (2016)
- Stats at NBA.com
- Stats at Basketball Reference

De'Aaron Martez Fox (born December 20, 1997) is an American professional basketball player for the San Antonio Spurs of the National Basketball Association (NBA). He played college basketball for the Kentucky Wildcats before being selected fifth overall by the Sacramento Kings in the 2017 NBA draft. Fox had a breakout season in 2023, earning his first All-Star selection, an All-NBA Team nod, and was named NBA Clutch Player of the Year while leading the Kings to their first postseason berth since 2006. He also led the league in steals in 2024. Traded to the Spurs at the 2025 trade deadline, Fox earned his second All-Star selection in 2026 and reached the NBA Finals with the team later that season.

== Early life ==
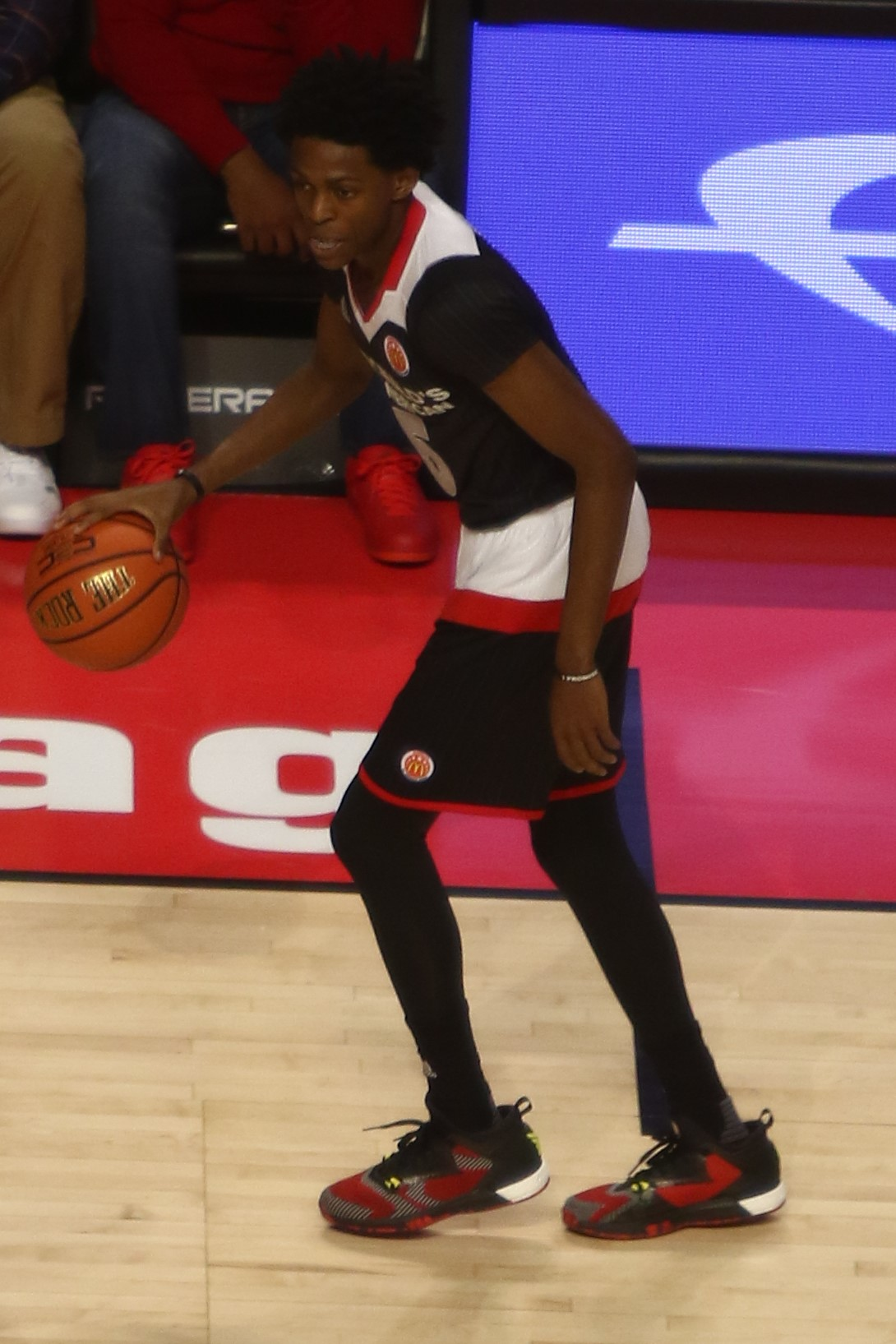
Fox at the 2016 McDonald's All-American Game

Fox attended Cypress Lakes High School in Cypress, Texas. As a junior, he averaged 23.8 points, 6.1 rebounds, and 3.5 assists per game. During the summer, Fox played for Houston Hoops in the Nike Elite Youth Basketball League Circuit (EYBL) where he earned EYBL first-team honors. On November 29, Fox scored 31 points, 12 rebounds, and 6 assists in a 68–53 victory over MacArthur. On December 28, Fox put up 31 points and 6 assists in a 91–81 victory against Jay M. Robinson High School. As a senior, Fox averaged 32.1 points, 7.6 rebounds, and 4.1 assists per game. In January 2016, Fox was named a McDonald's All-American and played in the 2016 McDonald's All-American Game on March 30. In April, Fox played in the 2016 Jordan Brand Classic, leading the East team to a 131–117 win while earning Co-MVP honors alongside Kentucky teammate Malik Monk. Fox then competed at the Nike Hoop Summit Games. He made the 2015–16 USA Men's Basketball Men's Junior Team in September 2015. He was also invited to the NBPA Top 100 camp. Throughout his high school career, Fox led Cypress Lakes to three state playoff appearances including a regional final appearance his senior year, and twice scored 50 points in a single game.

During his high school years in the Houston area, Fox also played on the AAU circuit with Houston Hoops ; he was teammates with future NBA players including Justin Jackson, Justise Winslow and Kelly Oubre Jr.. Fox and Jackson, who grew up in the same region, developed a close relationship through years of youth and AAU basketball before later following different collegiate paths.

In the class of 2016, Fox was the nation's second-best point guard behind Lonzo Ball. He was rated as a five-star recruit and ranked the consensus No. 6 overall recruit by the three main recruiting services: Rivals, ESPN, and 247Sports.

He committed to Kentucky over Kansas, Louisville, Arizona, and LSU on November 12, 2015, live on ESPNU. With his reason to choose UK he stated "It felt like a family (at UK)".

College recruiting
Name	Hometown	School	Height	Weight	Commit date
De'Aaron Fox; PG	Katy, Texas	Cypress Lakes (TX)	6 ft 3 in (1.91 m)	160 lb (73 kg)	Nov 12, 2015
De'Aaron Fox; PG	Recruit ratings: Scout: Rivals: 247Sports: ESPN: (96)				
Overall recruit ranking: Scout: 6 Rivals: 6 247Sports: 6 ESPN: 6
Note: In many cases, Scout, Rivals, 247Sports, On3, and ESPN may conflict in their listings of height and weight.; In these cases, the average was taken. ESPN grades are on a 100-point scale.; Sources: "Kentucky 2016 Basketball Commitments". Rivals.; "2016 Kentucky Wildcats Recruiting Class". ESPN.; "2016 Team Ranking". Rivals.

== College career ==
On November 13, 2016, Fox recorded 21 points and 3 assists during a 93–69 victory over Canisius College at the Bluegrass Showcase. Six days later, he posted 16 points and 6 assists to defeat Duquesne University, 93–69. In a game against Arizona State on November 28, he recorded a triple double with 14 points, 11 rebounds, and 10 assists; this made Fox only the second Wildcat in the history of Kentucky basketball to record one after Chris Mill in 1988. On January 7, 2017, Fox scored 27 points to go along with 6 assists in a 97–71 victory over Arkansas. He tallied 21 points and 5 assists to defeat Mississippi State, 88–81, on January 17. On February 18 that year, Fox scored 16 points and dished out 5 assists to help the Wildcats defeat the Georgia Bulldogs. On March 4, Fox scored 19 points in a 71–63 win over Texas A&M. Kentucky would go on to defeat Georgia in the quarterfinals and Alabama in the semi-finals. On March 12, Fox scored 18 points in an 82–65 win over Arkansas in the SEC tournament in addition earning SEC Tournament MVP honors. On March 17, Fox scored 19 points and 3 assists to defeat Northern Kentucky University in the first round of the NCAA tournament. On March 19, Fox scored 14 points to defeat Wichita State 65–62 in the second round of the NCAA Tournament. On March 24, In a Sweet 16 matchup against the UCLA Bruins, Fox scored 39 points to advance the Kentucky Wildcats to the Elite Eight game. In the Elite Eight, Fox only scored 13 points in the regional final,, while North Carolina forward Justin Jackson led the Tar Heels in scoring with 19 points. North Carolina secured a 75–73 victory on a last-second jumper by Luke Maye.

At the conclusion of his freshman season, Fox announced that he would forgo his final three years of collegiate eligibility and enter the 2017 NBA draft. As he stated in his announcement, "I think I’ve had a pretty good freshman season through the guidance of our coaching staff and I think it’s time for me to live out my dream."

== Professional career ==
=== Sacramento Kings (2017–2025) ===
==== Early years (2017–2019) ====
On June 22, 2017, Fox was selected with the fifth overall pick in the 2017 NBA draft by the Sacramento Kings. The team also selected former teammate Justin Jackson in the same round.

On July 8, 2017, he signed his rookie scale contract with the Kings. During four games of the 2017 NBA Summer League, Fox averaged 11.8 points, 3 assists and 2.3 steals while playing 21.3 minutes per game. Fox made his NBA debut for the Kings in their season opener on October 18, 2017, against the Houston Rockets, where he scored 14 points, 4 rebounds, and 5 assist in 24-plus minutes in a 105–100 loss. On October 23, 2017, Fox recorded a career-high 19 points, 4 assist, 5 rebounds, and 3 steals in a 117–115 loss against the Phoenix Suns. On December 8, 2017, he scored 14 points, 4 assist and 2 steals in a 116–109 win against the New Orleans Pelicans. On January 6, 2018, Fox recorded 18 points and 7 assist in a 106–98 victory over the Denver Nuggets. On January 25, 2018, Fox scored 14 points, 4 assist and a putback slam dunk with 3.3 seconds left giving the Sacramento Kings the lead in an 89–88 win over the Miami Heat. On January 28, 2018, Fox scored a season-high 26 points, going 6–6 from three-point range in a 15-point loss to the San Antonio Spurs. On February 14, Fox was named Lonzo Ball's replacement for the Rising Stars Challenge.

On November 1, 2018, during a 146–115 win over the Atlanta Hawks, Fox notched his first career triple-double with 31 points, 10 rebounds, and 15 assists to bring the Kings to a 6–3 record, becoming the only player after LeBron James in 2005 to score a 30-point triple double before the age of 21. Fox drastically improved during the 2018–2019 season. Not only did he improve in every major statistical category (Including his points per game from 11.6 to 17.3 and assists per game from 4.4 to 7.3), He also finished top 3 and was nominated for the NBA Most Improved Player Award, finishing second to Pascal Siakam.

==== Franchise player (2019–2022) ====
On July 31, 2020, Fox scored a then career-high 39 points in a 129–120 loss to the San Antonio Spurs. This was the Kings’ first game in the Orlando bubble, returning from a 4-month hiatus due to the COVID-19 pandemic.

On November 25, 2020, Fox signed a five-year, $163 million contract extension with the Kings. On February 8, 2021, Fox was named Western Conference Player of the Week for the first time in his career averaging 31 points & nearly 9 assists while winning all 4 games on the first week of February. On March 26, 2021, Fox scored a then career-high 44 points on 16-of-22 from the field in a 141–119 victory over the Golden State Warriors. On March 29, 2021, Fox was once again named Player of the Week for the second time during Week 14. Fox averaged nearly 37 points & 5 assists per game while shooting 64% from the field over the 4 games, all ending in victories for the Kings.

On March 5, 2022, Fox tied his then career-high with 44 points on 18-for-31 shooting in a 114–113 loss against the Dallas Mavericks. On March 12, Fox had 41 points and a season-high 11 assists in a 134–125 loss against the Utah Jazz.

==== First All-Star and playoff appearance (2022–2023) ====
On November 5, 2022, Fox put up 37 points, alongside a buzzer-beating, game-winning three, in a 126–123 overtime win over the Orlando Magic. He was named the Western Conference Player of the Week for November 14–20 after leading Sacramento to a 3–0 record, where he averaged 25 points, 3.7 rebounds and 8 assists per game. On December 28, Fox recorded 31 points and a season-high 13 assists in a 127–126 win over the Denver Nuggets. On February 10, 2023, he was named an All-Star for the first time in his career as a reserve. Fox and Anthony Edwards were announced as injury replacements for injured stars Stephen Curry and Zion Williamson. On February 24, Fox recorded a season-high 42 points, 12 assists, five rebounds and five steals in a 176–175 double overtime win over the Los Angeles Clippers. It was the second-highest scoring game in NBA history. On March 15, Fox put up a game-winning three-pointer in a 117–114 win over the Chicago Bulls.

In Game 1 of the Kings’ first round playoff series against the Golden State Warriors, Fox put up 38 points in a 126–123 win. This was the second-most points in a playoff debut, after Luka Dončić who scored 42 points in 2020. On April 19, 2023, Fox was named as the inaugural recipient of the NBA Clutch Player of the Year Award, winning over Jimmy Butler and DeMar DeRozan. He averaged 27.4 points and 7.7 assists in the series, but he couldn't avoid the Warriors winning the series in 7 games.

==== Career high in scoring and steals leader (2023–2025) ====
On November 17, 2023, Fox scored a season-high 43 points along with 8 rebounds and 7 assists in a 129–120 win over the San Antonio Spurs. On December 2, Fox scored 26 points and recorded a career-high 16 assists in a 123–117 win over the Denver Nuggets. On March 6, 2024, Fox tied his then career high with 44 points in a 130–120 win over the Los Angeles Lakers.

On November 15, 2024, Fox scored a career-high 60 points in a 130–126 overtime loss to the Minnesota Timberwolves. His 60 points set a franchise record for the most points scored by a Kings player in a game. The very next day, Fox scored 49 points and delivered 9 assists in a 122–117 win over the Utah Jazz. He became the second Sacramento player to score at least 100 points in a two-game span, with the other being DeMarcus Cousins in 2016 when he scored 104. Fox is just the third player in NBA history to score at least 109 over two days, joining Kobe Bryant (2007) and Wilt Chamberlain (17 different times).

=== San Antonio Spurs (2025–present) ===
On February 3, 2025, Fox was traded, alongside Jordan McLaughlin, to the San Antonio Spurs in a three-team trade also involving the Chicago Bulls in which they sent Zach LaVine, Sidy Cissoko, three first-round picks and two second-round picks to the Kings. The Spurs sent Zach Collins, Tre Jones and a 2025-first round pick to the Bulls, who also received Kevin Huerter from the Kings.

On February 5, Fox made his debut for the Spurs, recording 24 points, five rebounds, 13 assists (matching his season-high) and three steals in a 126–125 win over the Atlanta Hawks. He became the first player in Spurs franchise history to post 20+ points and 10+ assists in a debut. In 17 appearances for San Antonio, Fox averaged 19.7 points, 4.3 rebounds, and 6.8 assists. On March 13, it was announced that Fox would undergo season-ending surgery to repair tendon damage in his left pinkie finger.

On August 4, the Spurs and Fox reached a 4-year, $229 million maximum contract extension. The max deal has no player option in the final year and will keep him with the franchise until the 2029–30 season. On February 12, 2026, Fox was announced to be the replacement for Giannis Antetokounmpo for the 2026 NBA All-Star Game, marking it as his second official All Star appearance since the 2022–23 NBA season.

In Game 4 of the 2026 NBA Finals, Fox held the ball in a runout while the Spurs held a 106–105 lead. However, rather than dribbling out the clock as was expected, Fox attempted a layup, which was blocked by OG Anunoby, allowing the New York Knicks to gain possession. After a missed 3-pointer from Jalen Brunson, Anunoby achieved a tip-in to win the game at 107–106, completing a record 29-point comeback and giving the Knicks a 3–1 series lead over the Spurs. Fox's decision to attempt the layup was criticized as one of the biggest blunders in Finals history, drawing comparisons to J. R. Smith in Game 1 of the 2018 NBA Finals. The following game, Fox posted 7 points from 3-of-15 field goal attempts as the Spurs lost the series 4–1 to the Knicks. Fox received additional criticism from fans and the media for his performance in the series in the context of his contract extension, averaging 12.8 points while shooting 34.4% from the field and 25% from the three-point line.

== Awards and honors ==
NBA

- 2× NBA All-Star: 2023, 2026
- All-NBA Third Team: 2023
- NBA steals leader: 2024
- NBA Cup All-Tournament Team: 2025
- NBA Clutch Player of the Year: 2023

NCAA

- First-team All-SEC: 2017
- SEC All-Freshman Team: 2017
- SEC tournament MVP: 2017

== Career statistics ==
Legend
GP	Games played	GS	Games started	MPG	Minutes per game
FG%	Field goal percentage	3P%	3-point field goal percentage	FT%	Free throw percentage
RPG	Rebounds per game	APG	Assists per game	SPG	Steals per game
BPG	Blocks per game	PPG	Points per game	**Bold**	Career high
*	Led the league

=== NBA ===
==== Regular season ====
Year	Team	GP	GS	MPG	FG%	3P%	FT%	RPG	APG	SPG	BPG	PPG
2017–18	Sacramento	73	61	27.8	.412	.307	.726	2.8	4.4	1.0	.3	11.6
2018–19	Sacramento	**81**	**81**	31.4	.458	**.371**	.727	3.8	**7.3**	1.6	**.6**	17.3
2019–20	Sacramento	51	49	32.0	.480	.292	.705	3.8	6.8	1.5	.5	21.1
2020–21	Sacramento	58	58	35.1	.477	.322	.719	3.5	7.2	1.5	.5	25.2
2021–22	Sacramento	59	59	35.3	.473	.297	.750	3.9	5.6	1.2	.4	23.2
2022–23	Sacramento	73	73	33.4	**.512**	.324	.800	4.2	6.1	1.1	.3	25.0
2023–24	Sacramento	74	74	35.9	.465	.369	.738	4.6	5.6	**2.0***	.4	**26.6**
2024–25	Sacramento	45	45	**37.0**	.469	.322	**.829**	**5.0**	6.1	1.5	.4	25.0
2024–25	San Antonio	17	17	34.0	.446	.274	.819	4.3	6.8	1.5	.3	19.7
2025–26	San Antonio	72	72	31.0	.486	.332	.760	3.8	6.2	1.2	.3	18.6
Career		603	589	33.0	.472	.331	.747	3.9	6.1	1.4	.4	21.1
All-Star		2	0	11.9	.500	.333	—	.5	2.5	.5	.0	3.5

==== Playoffs ====
Year	Team	GP	GS	MPG	FG%	3P%	FT%	RPG	APG	SPG	BPG	PPG
2023	Sacramento	7	7	**38.5**	**.424**	**.333**	.756	**5.4**	**7.7**	**2.1**	**.6**	**27.4**
2026	San Antonio	**21**	**21**	33.5	.414	.294	**.758**	3.8	6.0	1.3	.4	15.6
Career		28	28	34.8	.418	.309	.757	4.2	6.4	1.5	.5	18.5

=== College ===
Year	Team	GP	GS	MPG	FG%	3P%	FT%	RPG	APG	SPG	BPG	PPG
2016–17	Kentucky	36	34	29.6	.479	.246	.736	4.0	4.6	1.5	.2	16.7

== Player profile ==
Listed at 6 feet 3 inches (1.91 m) and 185 pounds (84 kg), Fox has primarily played the point guard position throughout his career. He is left-handed.

Coming out of Kentucky, Fox was highly regarded among scouts for his quickness, speed, and athleticism. These attributes combined make Fox one of the most dangerous players on the fast break and driving to the rim. Fox himself stated in 2018 "If we’re talking about from baseline to baseline with the ball in my hands, I’m definitely the fastest person in the league."

Fox is a high end finisher at the rim, being able to use his body control and leaping ability to finish layups and draw fouls and often using his speed and quickness to blow by defenders. Fox is considered to be a poor 3-point shooter, as during the 2019–2020 NBA season, Fox shot a career low 29.2% shooting percentage from three.

Fox has also demonstrated good passing ability, averaging around seven assists per game. Fox generates most of his assists running the pick and roll and the fast break.

On defense, Fox can be exploited by bigger guards because of his small frame, but can intercept passes and makes quick rotations due to his elite quickness and nearly 6-foot 7 inch wingspan.

== Endorsements ==
Fox signed a multi-year endorsement deal with Nike prior to the 2017 NBA draft.

In October 2023, Fox signed a shoe deal with Curry Brand, making him the first official signature athlete for the brand.

== Personal life ==
Fox was born to his parents Aaron and Lorainne Harris-Fox and has one brother named Quentin Fox. Since elementary school, Fox goes by the nicknames “Fox”, “Swipa”, and “Swipa da Fox”, inspired by Swiper the Fox from the Nickelodeon television series Dora the Explorer and his ability on the court to record steals. Fox chose the number zero at Kentucky because he “fears no one”, giving his original number five to teammate Malik Monk, who played with him on the Kings. According to his high school coach, Fox would come to school at 6 AM and practice in the gym every morning. Fox would sleep on the couch almost every night and play the NBA 2K video game series. This, according to his father, is one of the reasons he has developed into the player that he is today.

Fox is also a fan of the Dragon Ball Z anime series and says that Vegeta is his favorite character. In 2017, Fox sported Dragon Ball Z inspired Nike shoes in game.

In February 2022, Fox was the subject of criticism after he shut down his personal NFT project “SwipaTheFox”, with more than $1.5 million in unpaid investment to approximately 100,000 investors. Fox explained his decision in a Twitter thread, wherein he claimed he wasn't satisfied with the quality of the project so far and was shutting it down until the end of the NBA season, but did not answer critics who demanded a return of their investment.

In August 2022, Fox married Recee Caldwell at an elaborate ceremony in Malibu, California. Caldwell gave birth to their son Reign Fox on February 3, 2023.

== See also ==
- List of NBA single-game scoring leaders
