= KSBI =

Television station in Oklahoma City

- Oklahoma City, Oklahoma; United States
- Channels: Digital: 23 (UHF); Virtual: 52
- Branding: KSBI Channel 52

Programming
- Affiliations: 52.1: Independent with MyNetworkTV; for others, see § Subchannels

Ownership
- Owner: Griffin Media; (Griffin Licensing, LLC)
- Sister stations: KWTV-DT

History
- Founded: August 30, 1982
- First air date: October 3, 1988
- Former channel numbers: Analog: 52 (UHF, 1988–2009); Digital: 51 (UHF, 2003–2014)
- Former affiliations: Independent (1988–2012)
- Call sign meaning: "Satellite Broadcasting Company"

Technical information
- Licensing authority: FCC
- Facility ID: 38214
- ERP: 1,000 kW
- HAAT: 330.7 m (1,085 ft)
- Transmitter coordinates: 35°35′52.1″N 97°29′23.2″W
- Translator(s): see § Translators

Links
- Public license information: Public file; LMS
- Website: www.news9.com/ksbi

KSBI (channel 52) is a television station in Oklahoma City, Oklahoma, United States. It is programmed primarily as an independent station, but maintains a secondary affiliation with MyNetworkTV. KSBI is owned by locally based Griffin Media alongside CBS affiliate KWTV-DT (channel 9). The two stations share studios on West Main Street in downtown Oklahoma City; KSBI's transmitter is located on the city's northeast side.

== History ==
=== Locke Supply ownership ===
The UHF channel 52 allocation was contested between two groups that vied to hold the construction permit to build a new station on the frequency. The first prospective permittee was Satellite Broadcasting Company – a religious nonprofit corporation headed by Donald J. Locke, owner of Oklahoma City-based regional hardware store chain Locke Supply Company, and his wife, Wanda McKenzie Locke – which petitioned the Federal Communications Commission (FCC) allocate a ninth television frequency in the Oklahoma City market (originally to have been assigned to Edmond) in the spring of 1979. The FCC Broadcast Bureau contended that, even though Edmond had no television channel assignments, Satellite Broadcasting failed to justify that such a need for one in the Oklahoma City suburb existed, but did allow the group to apply for use of the Oklahoma City-assigned allocation with Edmond as a designated city of license under the FCC's "15-mile" rule, which allowed licensees to assign a city of license located 15 miles (24 km) from the city to which the proposed station's broadcast assignment was designated. Satellite Broadcasting filed an application with the FCC for a license and construction permit on October 17, 1980, proposing to sign on a religious television station on the frequency. The second applicant, TV 52 Broadcasting, Inc., filed its own application on January 8, 1981.

The FCC granted the license to Satellite Broadcasting on April 15, 1982; two months later in August 1982, the group applied to use KSBI (standing for Satellite Broadcasting Co., Inc., in reference to the Locke-owned licensee) as the planned station's callsign. After six years of delays in getting KSBI operational, the station first signed on the air on October 3, 1988. KSBI's original studio facilities were housed out of Locke Supply's corporate offices on 82nd Street and Pole Road in southeast Oklahoma City. For its first 16 years on the air, channel 52 was largely run as a religious independent station; station management settled on the format after initially hedging on their original plans to institute a religious format, which had planned to lease free airtime to churches and televangelists. Atypical of most television stations on the air at that time, KSBI originally broadcast on a part-time basis, airing Monday through Fridays from 9 a.m. to 12:30 p.m. during a six-month test broadcasting stage. Programming expanded to 9 a.m. to 5 p.m. by March 1, 1989.

The station was exclusively available over-the-air in the market until June 1993, when must-carry rules passed by the FCC that allowed broadcast stations to request mandatory carriage on cable providers went into effect. Cox Cable—whose Oklahoma City system, at the time, only served the city proper and select inner-city suburbs—began offering KSBI on channel 40 (in 1995, Cox moved the station to channel 9, which suffered from co-channel interference from, ironically, the VHF analog signal of CBS affiliate and eventual sister station KWTV, which continued until Cox moved KSBI's basic cable slot to channel 15 in 2007); Multimedia Cablevision—which served outer suburbs including Edmond, Midwest City, Moore and Bethany, all of which are now served by Cox—placed KSBI on channel 33 at that time. In preparation for the addition to Cox and Multimedia, channel 52 adopted an 18-hour daily schedule from 6 a.m. to 12 am; the station would begin broadcasting 24 hours a day by 1996. During most of the 1990s and early 2000s, in addition to airing local and nationally syndicated religious programs, KSBI also carried a limited amount of secular sitcoms, Westerns and movies, some of which were cherry-picked from INSP and FamilyNet. Despite its format, KSBI did not accept or solicit financial support via monetary contributions from viewers.

Beginning in the 1990s, KSBI gradually signed on a network of translator stations throughout the state. Eventually, because of this wide relay network, channel 52 claimed to have the largest broadcast coverage area of any commercial television station in Oklahoma; at its peak, its signal was relayed over fourteen translators serving areas within the Oklahoma City market and in markets adjacent to it such as Tulsa, Elk City, Ponca City and Ardmore. It also gained cable (and eventually, satellite) coverage in the Tulsa, Wichita, Amarillo, Lawton–Wichita Falls and Ada–Sherman markets. In August 1999, the station upgraded its transmitter from an effective radiated power of 1,355 kW to a total power of three million watts, after installing a new transmitter antenna atop the 1,600-foot (490 m) broadcast tower on 122nd Street and Kelley Avenue in northeast Oklahoma City.

In June 2000, KSBI began including more family-oriented secular programming in themed evening blocks (consisting of western series and films on Mondays; sports on Tuesdays; music programs on Wednesdays; wildlife, outdoor and automotive series on Thursdays; family-focused series on Fridays; classic comedy series on Saturdays; and religious and gospel music programs on Sundays). The inclusion of more secular programs to the schedule was partially cited because of the decline in Southern gospel music programming available on the syndication market. At that time, KSBI placed guidelines for its advertising and program content, prohibiting certain types of advertising (such as for alcoholic beverages or psychic hotlines), infomercials, telethons or religious programs that solicited donations from viewers.

=== Sale to Family Broadcasting Group ===
Following Don Locke's death in February 2000, Locke Supply's board of directors—led by Locke's former wife, Wanda McKenzie, who took over as the company's chief executive officer—were approached by various station owners beginning in April 2001 for offers to acquire KSBI, its regional translator network and low-power sister station KXOC-LP (channel 54, later on channel 41; now defunct). In the interim, KSBI and its sister properties were involuntarily transferred from Locke's estate to an employee stock ownership plan handled by Locke Supply, which received FCC approval on November 17 of that year. The company ultimately decided to sell off the stations to focus on operating the Locke Supply chain that Don Locke founded more than three decades earlier. On October 8, 2001, Locke Supply agreed to sell KSBI to Christian Media Group, a newly formed locally based company that was founded by former KWTV meteorologist Brady Brus; his sister and local media personality Brenda Bennett; John Benefiel, senior pastor of Church on the Rock; and media executive Jerry Mash.

However, Christian Media's agreement to buy the station would fall apart, after the upstart company failed to pay its $15 million bid to purchase KSBI from Locke. The company attempted to accrue the funds to buy the cluster, but were unable to obtain the needed cash, even after it was granted several extensions to come up with the money. Station management subsequently increased the estimated purchase value to $20 million, largely because of the station's then-recent launch of its digital television signal; KSBI was the first in Oklahoma to offer two digital subchannels, including HDNet and a simulcast of its analog feed.

Brus and Bennett would get a second chance to acquire KSBI, KXOC and the former's translator network on July 8, 2003, when Locke sold the stations to Family Broadcasting Group of Oklahoma, Inc., a restructuring of the former Christian Media Group that the siblings co-founded with Brady's wife, certified public accountant and treasurer Angie Brus; and Joe Bowie, co-president/CEO of Retirement Investment Advisors Inc. and Seekfirst Media LLC. The deal included permissory rights for Family Broadcasting to take over the operations of KSBI and KXOC-LP under a time-lease agreement effective July 21, which would continue until the acquisition received regulatory approval by the FCC (officially occurring on January 12, 2004); the sale was finalized on March 17, 2004.

After Family Broadcasting assumed full control of the station, KSBI was repositioned as a family-oriented general entertainment independent with syndicated secular programming that contained minimal to no sexual content, overt violence or strong profanity added to the schedule (programs that contained some degree of the aforementioned content were edited—usually through muting of profanity and occasional, abrupt commercial interruptions to omit scenes containing adult material—to fit the station's content standards). Most of the initial secular programs seen on KSBI under Brus' management consisted of sitcoms, drama series and westerns from the 1960s to the early 1990s.

The station also launched a weather department—which it heavily invested in—and aired local weather updates throughout the broadcast day (including five-minute midday, late afternoon and evening updates on weekdays presented by a two-person on-camera weather staff led by Brus, who also served as the station's chief meteorologist in addition to his duties as its owner and general manager), incorporating interactive touch screen technology for its weather presentation and installing a network of remote cameras throughout various cities across Oklahoma (branded as the "KSBI Statecam Network"). In February 2004, the station became the first television station in Oklahoma to provide severe weather watches and warnings in both English and Spanish. Channel 52 also eventually added sporting events to its schedule, consisting mainly of basketball and football games from state high school and Southeastern Conference collegiate teams.

While its syndicated inventory was fairly limited early on, KSBI eventually expanded its programming slate; this began in the fall of 2008 with the additions of NurseTV, Lost and American Chopper, followed the next year by the acquisitions of Deadliest Catch, Cold Case Files, The Martha Stewart Show, Judge Hatchett, My Wife and Kids and then the addition of The King of Queens to the schedule in the spring of 2010.

Chesapeake Energy co-founders Aubrey McClendon and Tom L. Ward purchased a portion of Family Broadcasting stock in January 2007; this investment occurred after Family's equity was restructured to retire all long-term debt.

After reaching a deal with the NBA's Oklahoma City Thunder to telecast select regular season games in 2008, KSBI rebranded as "Thunder TV". That year, the station also began construction on a new state-of-the-art studio facility in Yukon; completed in the spring of 2009, KSBI relocated to the new facility by that September. That year, DirecTV began carrying KSBI's programming in the Tulsa area as an out-of-market station (the station was removed from the satellite provider in January 2012 following a carriage dispute between Family Broadcasting Group and DirecTV).

Family Broadcasting appointed two former KOCO-TV veterans as lead executives on November 1, 2010: Vince Orza and Jerry Hart became KSBI's president/CEO and vice president/operations manager, respectively. Orza and Hart worked together at KOCO during the 1980s. The station also divested some of its translators; six were converted into repeaters of former sister station KXOC-LP, while two others based in Enid and Stillwater continued to rebroadcast KSBI's signal. The station updated its programming mix, shifting from classic series to newer syndicated programs while introducing a slate of new locally produced shows.

KSBI affiliated with MyNetworkTV on September 17, 2012, replacing KAUT-TV (channel 43), which reverted to independent status.

=== Griffin ownership ===
In September 2014, KSBI cancelled the majority of their local output, including talk show Oklahoma Live and game show Wild Card, and laid off most of its employees. One week later, Family Broadcasting agreed to sell KSBI to KWTV owner Griffin Communications; Griffin previously sought to purchase KSBI in 2001, and was outbid by Christian Media Group. Griffin executives touted the addition of KSBI as a new way to offer CBS network shows and syndicated programming that KWTV would preempt in the event of severe weather coverage or breaking news.

KSBI was rebranded as "News 9 Plus", a brand extension of KWTV, on March 1, 2017.

Griffin Communications purchased the Century Center business and retail complex in downtown Oklahoma City for $26 million on July 12, 2021, for the company's new corporate headquarters, along with new facilities for KWTV and KSBI. The new studios were completed on November 12, 2022.

== Programming ==
=== Local programming ===
Upon taking over the operations of Family Broadcasting Group in 2010, CEO Vince Orza and vice president Jerry Hart began developing local programming for KSBI that would serve as an alternative to the news-based local programs on other Oklahoma City area stations, featuring a mix of talk, lifestyle and entertainment programs.

Initial local programs produced under Orza and Hart's management of the station—neither of which gained much ratings momentum—included the lifestyle-oriented talk program All About You (which was cancelled in June 2012), local cooking show Oklahoma Cooks (which was cancelled in August 2012), movie review program Hollywood Spotlight (a revival of the program that originally aired on KOCO-TV until 1997, both incarnations were hosted by Dino Lalli; the revived program was cancelled in December 2012) and the sports discussion program OK Sports Wrap (which was cancelled in May 2013). Orza also provided a commentary segment that aired during certain commercial breaks titled Common Sense, in which Orza gave his opinion on a particular national or local news story; these segments were discontinued in 2014.

2011 and 2012 saw the debuts of four new programs: the daytime interview show Oklahoma Live!, country music showcase Oklahoma Centennial Rodeo Opry (a co-production with the Opry Heritage Foundation of Oklahoma, which was taped at the Oklahoma Opry in Oklahoma City's Capitol Hill district, and hosted by local radio DJ Owen Pickard; the program was distributed nationally on Pursuit Channel from September 2012 until its cancellation), Dog Talk (a program aimed at dog owners, hosted by Pat Becker) and College Bowl-style quiz show Mind Games (the program, featuring teams from colleges and universities across Oklahoma, was retitled Mind Games: College Edition in 2012, when a spinoff called Mind Games: High School Edition featuring contestants from Oklahoma high schools debuted). In November 2013, KSBI debuted the trivia game show Wild Card (hosted by former KWTV sports/news anchor and Mind Games host Ed Murray) and Night Music, a weekly music series hosted by Allison Gappa that featured repurposed music performances from Oklahoma Live! (which was cancelled in February 2014). Oklahoma Live and Wild Card were cancelled shortly before the sale to Griffin was announced in September 2014; the remaining local shows were dropped once Griffin took over KSBI that December (of these programs, only Dog Talk continues in production, as KAUT-TV assumed the rights to the program in May 2015).

=== Sports programming ===
Under Family Broadcasting ownership, KSBI carried high school sports, mainly football and basketball post-season tournaments, via the Oklahoma Secondary School Activities Association (OSSAA) from 2005 through 2010. In April 2008, KSBI televised select Oklahoma City Yard Dawgz games from the Arena Football League.

The station was the over-the-air home of Oklahoma City Thunder games and ancillary team programming starting with the team's 2008–09 inaugural season, sharing broadcast rights with Fox Sports Oklahoma (now FanDuel Sports Network Oklahoma). This deal ended in 2010, when the Thunder gave Fox Sports Oklahoma broadcast exclusivity. KSBI also carried Texas Rangers games on Friday evenings via KTXA's over-the-air network during the 2012 season. In 2024, the Thunder returned to KSBI as part of an eight-game agreement for Friday night games.

In the 2024–25 NBA season, KWTV and KSBI simulcast five Oklahoma City Thunder games in partnership with FanDuel Sports Network Oklahoma, as part of a deal between Griffin Media and the team; this agreement would continue in 2025–26 with three preseason games on KSBI and four regular season contests on KWTV. With the winddown of FanDuel Sports Network, Griffin will assume the regional rights to the Thunder full-time in the 2026–27 season: the games will be carried by cable-exclusive feeds of KSBI, while 10 games will be broadcast over the air on either KSBI or KWTV.

Later that year, the agreement between Griffin Media and Main Street Sports Group expanded to include select Major League Baseball (MLB) broadcasts. Coverage included games from the St. Louis Cardinals and Kansas City Royals, which were also simulcast on FanDuel Sports Network Midwest and FanDuel Sports Network Kansas City, respectively.

High school football coverage returned to KSBI beginning in 2015 through a new agreement with the OSSAA, with game coverage on Friday nights and select Thursday nights in addition to Class 5A and 6A football championships. This agreement was expanded to include Class 5A and 6A high school basketball championship games in 2017.

KBSI carried all OKC Energy FC home games from 2016 to 2018, when the United Soccer League signed an exclusive league-wide streaming deal with ESPN+. Since 2016, the station has carried games from the Thunder's NBA G League affiliate, the Oklahoma City Blue.

=== Newscasts ===
After being purchased by Family Broadcasting Group in early 2004, KSBI launched Hello Oklahoma, a daily talk show with news updates and weather forecasts from Brady Brus. By 2008, the station aired a daily early-evening newscast, Oklahoma News Tonight, and utilitzed satellite technology for newsgathering. Following a studio move in August 2010, Brus announced intentions to launch late-evening newscasts on KSBI but after a managerial change that November, the station dropped all local news programming and added The Daily Buzz in early mornings; this was estimated to save the station up to $200,000 annually. Former anchor Kealey McIntire was reassigned to host a lifestyle program It's About You, and sports anchor Brian Birchell hosted OK Sports Wrap.

Since February 3, 2015, KSBI has simulcast KWTV's noon newscast.

== Technical information ==
=== Subchannels ===
The station's signal is multiplexed:

Subchannels of KSBI
Subchannel	Res.	Short name	Programming
52.1	1080i	KSBI-HD	Main KSBI programming
52.2	480i	BOUNCE	Bounce TV
52.3	480i	LAFF	Laff
52.4	480i	GRIT	Grit
52.5	480i	ION+	Ion Plus

=== Analog-to-digital conversion ===
KSBI began transmitting a digital television signal on UHF channel 51 on February 1, 2003. The station chose to continue to simultaneously operate its analog and digital signals past the original February 17, 2009, digital television transition deadline; as KSBI operated a weather department at the time, this was done to enable viewers that were not prepared for the transition to continue receiving emergency weather information during the Spring 2009 severe weather season. The station ended regular programming on its analog signal, over UHF channel 52, on June 1, 2009. The station's digital signal remained on its pre-transition UHF channel 51, using virtual channel 52.

On July 18, 2014, the FCC granted an application to relocate KSBI's digital signal to UHF channel 23; the station continued to operate its existing UHF 51 signal under a special temporary authority (STA), with an on-screen message directing viewers to rescan their digital tuners to receive the UHF 23 signal until KSBI ceased broadcasting on UHF channel 51 on August 1, 2014.

=== Translators ===
KSBI is additionally rebroadcast over a network of four low-power digital translator stations:

- Elk City: K20NJ-D
- Sayre: K21JN-D
- Strong City: K23IZ-D
- Weatherford: K35MQ-D
