= KTYJ-LP =

Television station in Coeur d'Alene, Idaho

Coeur d'Alene, Idaho; United States
- Channels: Analog: 58 (UHF)

Programming
- Affiliations: Independent (1994–1998); Religious Ind. (1998–2009)

Ownership
- Owner: Christian Broadcasting of Idaho, Inc.

History
- Founded: July 9, 1990
- First air date: May 1, 1994
- Last air date: July 13, 2009
- Former call signs: K58DQ (1994–1997)

Technical information
- Facility ID: 15648
- Class: TX
- ERP: 20.3 kW
- HAAT: 671 m (2,201 ft)
- Transmitter coordinates: 47°39′36.01″N 116°57′46.95″W

KTYJ-LP (channel 58) was a low-power television station in Coeur d'Alene, Idaho, United States. It began broadcasting in 1994 as an independent station; its operation was dominated by a legal dispute that led to a bankruptcy filing as investors cut the licensee out of station management. The dispute ended in 1996 with the owner, David Derryberry, receiving control; under his management, the station returned in 1997, became KTYJ-LP, and was sold to Christian Broadcasting of Idaho, Inc. That company ran KTYJ until 2009, when it closed for financial reasons.

== History ==
The station went on air as K58DQ on May 1, 1994, from a transmitter on Canfield Butte. The permit had previously belonged to the King Broadcasting Company, owner of KREM-TV in Spokane. David Derryberry, a retired TV producer, acquired the K58DQ permit in 1992 and began planning a local-service low-power station for the Coeur d'Alene area. The station aired programming from the HomeNet service as well as classic TV shows. It also planned to introduce a local newscast focusing on news of North Idaho, though this did not happen by October 1994. The Kootenai County cable system added K58DQ to its lineup on December 1, giving it access to some 18,000 subscribers. In 1995, the station began carrying Seattle Mariners baseball games from KIRO-TV in Seattle. When the Mariners moved from KSTW to KIRO, they lost cable coverage in the area; K58DQ was able to afford the games because KIRO was paid in airtime to sell during the broadcasts.

Within a year of going on air, K58DQ encountered financial and legal issues. Derryberry was removed from management in January 1995 and a new limited liability company set up at the same time it filed for Chapter 11 bankruptcy reorganization. The takeover of K58DQ management by Idaho Broadcast Network generated further litigation. Derryberry alleged that his investors cut him out illegally by forging his signature on a document. Derryberry remained the licensee, so the changeover was an unauthorized transfer of control in the eyes of the Federal Communications Commission. Idaho Broadcast Network fell into its own financial troubles; within 18 months of the February 1995 bankruptcy filing, the station's liabilities to creditors doubled, and a series of general managers defrauded advertisers by agreeing to trade-out deals for services but not airing the promised commercials. Derryberry was barred by a court order from visiting the station he still technically owned. In August 1996, a bankruptcy court judge awarded control of K58DQ to Derryberry; because another person had loaned the station its transmitter, the station had to leave the air beginning August 30.

After six months, K58DQ returned to the air under Derryberry control in February 1997, though in the time it was off the air it had been removed from cable. The new general manager believed his predecessor should have been charged with felony theft for stealing videotapes. The station was renamed KTYJ-LP later that year and sold to Christian Broadcasting of Idaho (associated with CSN International) in 1998.

By 2009, KTYJ-LP was up for sale in classified advertisements. It was taken off the air for financial reasons on July 14, 2009; Christian Broadcasting of Idaho attempted to sell the station in 2010, but by that time it had been off the air more than a year, automatically causing its broadcast license to expire.
