= W10BM =

Television station in Morehead, Kentucky

Morehead, Kentucky; United States
- Channels: Analog: 10 (VHF)
- Branding: TV-10 Morehead

Programming
- Affiliations: Independent

Ownership
- Owner: Vearl Pennington

History
- Founded: 1988

Technical information
- Licensing authority: FCC
- Facility ID: 69839
- Class: TX
- ERP: 0.018 kW
- HAAT: 30 m (98 ft)
- Transmitter coordinates: 38°11′3″N 83°27′43″W (claimed on license)

Links
- Public license information: Public file; LMS

W10BM (channel 10) was a low power television station in Morehead, Kentucky, United States, that later operated unlicensed and was fined as a pirate station by the Federal Communications Commission (FCC).

== Licensed broadcast term ==
The FCC granted an amended construction permit for W10BM by December 4, 1987, and a license by March 29, 1990. A license renewal expired on August 1, 1998. The licensed parameters were for 18 watts at 30 meters (98 ft) above ground level, broadcasting on VHF channel 10 with a city of license of Morehead, Kentucky, and licensee named as Vearl Pennington at a post office box in Mount Sterling, Kentucky.

On April 27, 2004, the FCC sent the Mount Sterling post office box a letter saying that W10BM at Morehead, as well as W06BC at Mount Sterling, would be cancelled unless the FCC received a response. On October 18, 2004, a letter was sent to the same address, stating that no response was received and both station licenses were cancelled.

== Pirate broadcasts and fines ==
On May 12, 2017, the FCC fined the station's operators, Vearl Pennington and Michael Williamson, $144,344 for continuing to operate W10BM despite the cancellation of the license. The fine was upheld on January 28, 2019.

The channel remained on the air through carriage via local Spectrum systems, until it was dropped on February 23, 2022. If it was still broadcasting using its transmitter, likewise, it also violated the FCC's July 13, 2021, deadline for all analog television operations to end.
