= NurseTV (TV network) =

US Internet television network

NurseTV (NTV) is an Internet television network and nationally syndicated television show devoted to nurses and the nursing profession in the United States.
