= 2024–25 Oklahoma City Thunder season =

- NBA champions
- Conference champions
- Division champions
- Head coach: Mark Daigneault
- General manager: Sam Presti
- Owners: Professional Basketball Club LLC; Clay Bennett (chairman)
- Arena: Paycom Center

Results
- Record: 68–14 (.829)
- Place: Division: 1st (Northwest); Conference: 1st (Western)
- Playoff finish: NBA champions (defeated Pacers 4–3)
- Stats at Basketball Reference

Local media
- Television: FanDuel Sports Network Oklahoma; Griffin Media (KWTV-DT/KSBI – 5 games, KOTV-DT/KQCW-DT – 5 games)
- Radio: KWPN and WWLS-FM

The 2024–25 Oklahoma City Thunder season was the 17th season of the franchise in Oklahoma City and its 59th season in the National Basketball Association (NBA).

The Thunder advanced to the 2024 NBA Cup knockout stage as the winner of West Group B after finishing the group stage with a 3–1 record and winning the head-to-head tiebreaker over the Phoenix Suns by virtue of their group-stage victory on November 15. They would defeat the Dallas Mavericks in the quarterfinals and the Houston Rockets in the semifinals before losing to the Milwaukee Bucks in the championship game.

On March 12, 2025, the Thunder clinched their 2nd consecutive playoff berth with a win over the Boston Celtics. On April 10, following a loss by the Cleveland Cavaliers, the Thunder won the Maurice Podoloff Trophy and home-court for the entire playoffs for clinching the best record in the NBA for the first time in franchise history. The Thunder outscored their opponents by 12.9 points per game during the regular season, which was more than half a point better than the previous record holder 1971–72 Los Angeles Lakers' 12.3 points per game.

On April 20, the Thunder defeated the Memphis Grizzlies 131–80, the biggest Game 1 victory in playoff history. Team star Shai Gilgeous-Alexander won the 2025 NBA MVP award, becoming the third recipient in franchise history; Kevin Durant and Russell Westbrook previously won for the Thunder in 2014 and 2017, respectively. On May 28, 2025, the Thunder defeated the Minnesota Timberwolves in Game 5 of the Western Conference Finals to clinch their first NBA Finals berth since 2012 and their second in Oklahoma City. They would go on to defeat the Indiana Pacers in seven games, winning their second NBA championship, and their first since 1979, when they were known as the Seattle SuperSonics. In Game 7, they were the first team to score 100 points or more in Game 7 of the NBA Finals since the Los Angeles Lakers and Detroit Pistons did so in 1988.

At an average age of 25.6 years old, they were the second youngest team to win an NBA championship, behind only the 1976–77 Portland Trail Blazers. Their Finals victory was the first championship of any major professional sport in the state of Oklahoma. The Thunder also became the fourth team in NBA history to win 84 games or better in a single season, including playoff victories (the Chicago Bulls did it twice, followed by the Golden State Warriors). They also became the first team in NBA history to play for the NBA Cup and the NBA Finals in the same season.

Following the Thunder's championship victory, several politicians across Oklahoma celebrated, including Oklahoma City mayor David Holt, Oklahoma governor Kevin Stitt, United States representative Stephanie Bice, and United States senator James Lankford.

The Oklahoma City Thunder drew an average home attendance of 17,972, the 16th-highest of all NBA teams.

== Previous season ==
The Thunder finished the 2023–24 season 57–25 to finish first in the Northwest Division, first in the Western conference for the first time since 2013 and qualified for the playoffs for the first time since 2020. The Thunder won its first round series, sweeping the New Orleans Pelicans before losing to the fifth-seeded Dallas Mavericks in six games. The Mavericks went on to win the western conference, before being defeated 4-1 in the finals by the Celtics.

With the return of Chet Holmgren from injury, the Thunder again exceeded their win expectations behind Shai Gilgeous-Alexander, Holmgren, and second-year forward Jalen Williams. Gilgeous-Alexander finished second in MVP voting behind 30.1 points on a career high 53.5% field goal percentage.

== Offseason ==
=== Draft ===
Round	Pick	Player	Position	Nationality	Club team
1	12	Nikola Topić	PG	Serbia	Crvena Zvezda
Dillon Jones and Ajay Mitchell were later traded to the Thunder

The Thunder had one first-round pick entering the draft. This would be first NBA draft since the draft was first trimmed down to two rounds back in 1989 that the event would take place in multiple days instead of just one day. The pick – originally acquired from the Houston Rockets – had a 1.50% chance to win the first pick, acquired through the Russell Westbrook trade in 2019. With an 85.2% chance at staying at twelfth, the Thunder ended the night with the 12th overall pick.

On the first night of the draft, the Thunder selected Nikola Topić out of Crvena Zvezda in Serbia with the 12th pick. Coming out of Crvena Zvezda, Topić averaged 15.1 points, 3.2 rebounds, and 5.9 assists, being named the ABA League Top Prospect Award winner. In the 2023 FIBA U18 European Championship, Topić led Serbia to the gold medal, scoring 24 points in the championship game. Listed as 6'6", Topić drew comparisons to Josh Giddey and Goran Dragić as a big guard with excellent pace when driving to the basket and a great distributor. The Thunder then traded five future second-round picks to the New York Knicks in exchange for the draft rights to Dillon Jones, the 26th overall pick. A four-year senior out of Weber State, Jones averaged 20.8 points on 48.9% shooting, 9.8 rebounds, 5.2 assists and 2.0 steals, finishing fifth in school history in points, third in rebounds, second in assists, and first in steals. In his last season, Jones led the Big Sky Conference in total points, defensive rebounds, and assists per games, being named the Big Sky Player of the Year. In a series of trades made during the second day of the draft, the Thunder acquired the draft rights to Ajay Mitchell, the 38th overall pick, from the New York Knicks in exchange for the draft rights to Oso Ighodaro and cash considerations after first acquiring the draft rights to Quinten Post from the Golden State Warriors in exchange for Lindy Waters III and then acquiring the draft rights to Ighodaro from the Portland Trail Blazers in exchange for the draft rights to Post and cash considerations. Mitchell played three seasons for UC Santa Barbara, averaging 20.0 points on 50.4% shooting, being named to the All-Big West First Team and second in the Big West Conference in points per game last season. Described by having a solid frame, Mitchell is seen as a project player needing to work on his shooting form.

The Thunder ended 2024 NBA draft night with Serbian guard Nikola Topić, Weber State guard Dillon Jones, and UC Santa Barbara guard Ajay Mitchell.

=== Free agency ===
For this offseason, free agency began on June 30, 2024, at 6:00 p.m. EST. Bismack Biyombo, Gordon Hayward, Mike Muscala were set to hit unrestricted free agency while two-way players Keyontae Johnson and Olivier Sarr were set to hit restricted free agency. In addition, Isaiah Joe and Aaron Wiggins had an upcoming team option heading into the season. On June 29, the Thunder declined Isaiah Joe's and Aaron Wiggins's team option in order to work on long-term deals with Joe and Wiggins. On July 1, it was reported that Isaiah Joe agreed to a four-year, $48 million contract to re-sign with the Thunder, which he later signed on July 7. In two seasons, Joe averaged 8.8 points on 41.2% three-point shooting, ranking 18th in the league in three-point shooting. On the same day, it was reported that Aaron Wiggins agreed to a five-year, $47 million contract to re-sign with the Thunder, which he later signed on July 7. Originally from the 2021 NBA draft, Wiggins averaged 6.9 points, shooting a career-high 56.2% from the field and 49.2% from three-point range.

On July 1, it was reported that Isaiah Hartenstein agreed to a three-year, $87 million contract with the Thunder, which he later signed on July 6. Beginning his career with the Houston Rockets, Hartenstein developed with the Los Angeles Clippers and spent the last two seasons with the New York Knicks, starting 49 games for the Knicks following Mitchell Robinson's injury. During the 2023–24 season, Hartenstein averaged 7.8 points, 8.3 rebounds. 1.2 steals, and 1.1 blocks on 64.4% shooting. With Hartenstein, the Thunder addressed their rebounding issues after ranking 28th in the league in rebounding percentage.

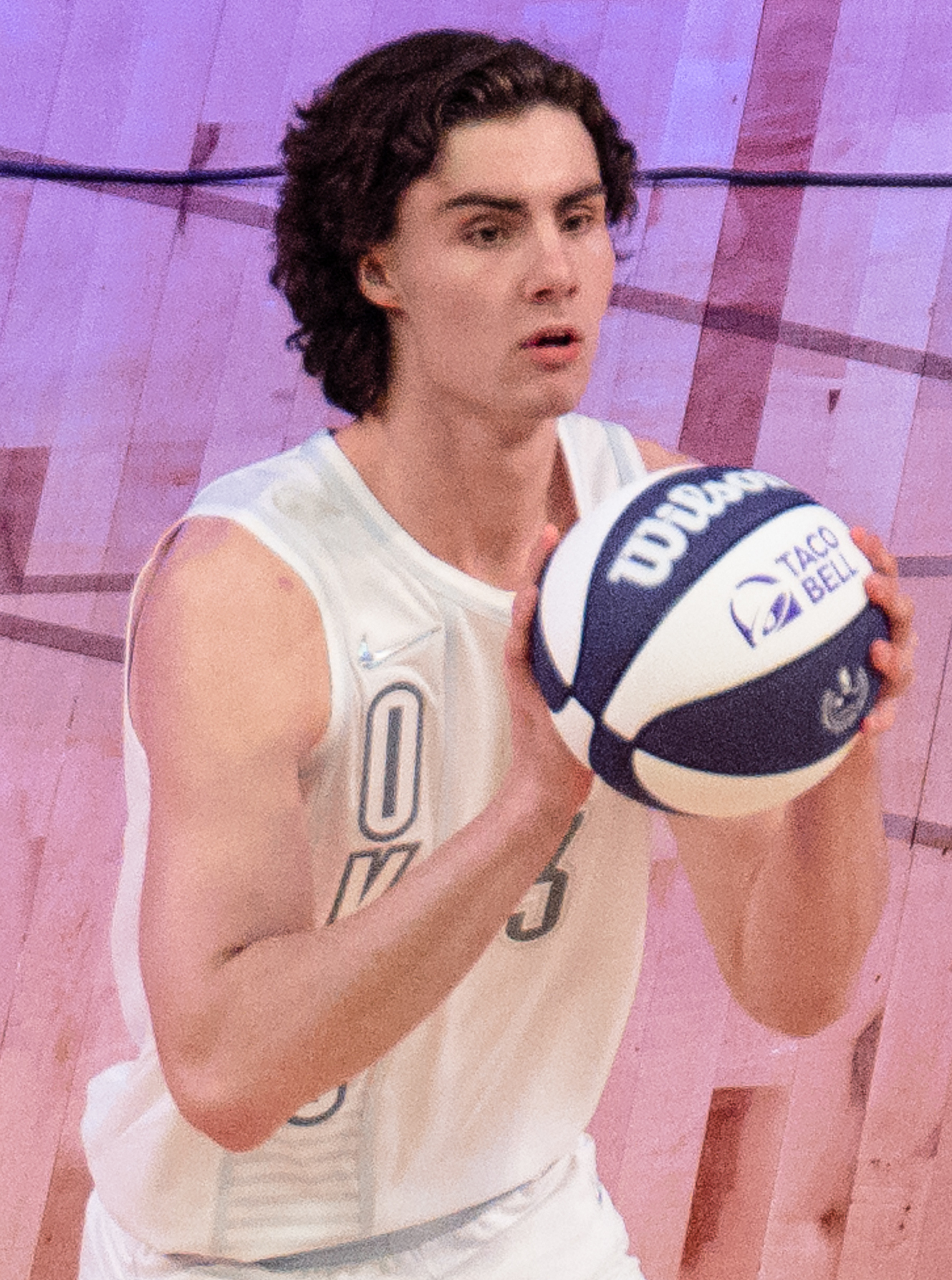
Josh Giddey was traded to the Chicago Bulls for Alex Caruso after three seasons with the Thunder.

=== Trades ===
On June 21, the Thunder acquired Alex Caruso from the Chicago Bulls in exchange for Josh Giddey. Caruso, who started his professional career for the Oklahoma City Blue in the NBA G League, has been a two-time All-Defensive Team member, averaged a career-high 10.1 points, 3.8 rebounds, 3.5 assists, 1.6 steals, and 1.0 blocks on 46.8% shooting and 40.8% three-point shooting last season. Being honored the 2024 NBA Hustle Award, Caruso led the league in deflections per game and was the only player in the league to record 130-plus threes, 100-plus steals, and 70-plus blocks last season. With the emergence of Jalen Williams, Giddey averaged a career-low 12.3 points in only 25.1 minutes per game. Despite improving his three-point shooting, Giddey was inconsistent, resulting in defenses sagging off of him that led to head coach Mark Daigneault benching him during the 2024 NBA playoffs against the Dallas Mavericks. Thunder general manager Sam Presti quoted that the Thunder planned to bring Giddey off the bench next season, however Giddey revealed he wasn't "overly eager."

=== Summer League ===
Salt Lake City

The Thunder participated in the 2024 Salt Lake City Summer League alongside the Utah Jazz, Memphis Grizzlies and the Philadelphia 76ers. This marked the third straight year the Thunder participated in the round-robin showcase. On July 7, the Thunder announced their summer league roster for Salt Lake City which notably featured Ousmane Dieng, Keyontae Johnson, Adam Flagler, Dillon Jones, and Ajay Mitchell.

Schedule

ESPN

Day 1 – July 8

Box Score

Oklahoma City Thunder 92, Philadelphia 76ers 102
Scoring by quarter: 26–26, 25–32, 18–18, 23–26
Pts: Flagler (18); Rebs: Jones (10); Asts: Jones (7)	Pts: Council (29); Rebs: Aluma & Council (8); Asts: Dowtin & Hampton (4)

Delta Center, Salt Lake City, Utah
Attendance: 0
Referees: Italo Araujo, Gina Catanzariti, RJ Johnson

ESPN2

Day 2 – July 9

Box Score

Oklahoma City Thunder 98, Utah Jazz 75
Scoring by quarter: 29–18, 29–24, 19–14, 21–21
Pts: Jones (21); Rebs: Kelley (8); Asts: Mitchell (10)	Pts: Lofton Jr. & Sensabaugh (18); Rebs: Bazley (8); Asts: Lofton Jr. (4)

Delta Center, Salt Lake City, Utah
Attendance: 8,583
Referees: Gina Catanzariti, Cam Garber, Kastine Evans

NBA TV

Day 3 – July 10

Box Score

Memphis Grizzlies 77, Oklahoma City Thunder 80
Scoring by quarter: 20–19, 13–15, 18–18, 26–28
Pts: Jemison (20); Rebs: Jarreau & Jemison (8); Asts: Pippen Jr. (5)	Pts: Mitchell (21); Rebs: Johnson (7); Asts: Dieng (8)

Delta Center, Salt Lake City, Utah
Attendance: 0
Referees: Cam Garber, Italo Araujo, Julian Scott

Las Vegas

The Thunder participated in the 2024 Las Vegas Summer League following a 2–1 record in the Salt Lake City Summer League. Head coach Daniel Dixon announced that Ousmane Dieng will sit out in Las Vegas after playing three games in Utah, averaging 15.7 points on 34.6% shooting.

== Roster ==
2024–25 Oklahoma City Thunder roster
Players

Pos.	No.	Player	Height	Weight	DOB	From
C	15	Branden Carlson (TW)	7 ft 0 in (2.13 m)	220 lb (100 kg)	1999-06-14	Utah
G	9	Alex Caruso	6 ft 5 in (1.96 m)	186 lb (84 kg)	1994-02-28	Texas A&M
F	13	Ousmane Dieng	6 ft 9 in (2.06 m)	185 lb (84 kg)	2003-05-21	France
G/F	5	Luguentz Dort	6 ft 4 in (1.93 m)	220 lb (100 kg)	1999-04-19	Arizona State
G/F	88	Alex Ducas (TW)	6 ft 7 in (2.01 m)	220 lb (100 kg)	2000-12-11	Saint Mary's
G	14	Adam Flagler (TW)	6 ft 3 in (1.91 m)	180 lb (82 kg)	1999-12-01	Baylor
G	2	Shai Gilgeous-Alexander	6 ft 6 in (1.98 m)	195 lb (88 kg)	1998-07-12	Kentucky
C	55	Isaiah Hartenstein	7 ft 0 in (2.13 m)	250 lb (113 kg)	1998-05-05	Germany
F/C	7	Chet Holmgren	7 ft 1 in (2.16 m)	208 lb (94 kg)	2002-05-01	Gonzaga
G	11	Isaiah Joe	6 ft 3 in (1.91 m)	165 lb (75 kg)	1999-07-02	Arkansas
F	3	Dillon Jones	6 ft 5 in (1.96 m)	235 lb (107 kg)	2001-10-29	Weber State
G	25	Ajay Mitchell	6 ft 5 in (1.96 m)	190 lb (86 kg)	2002-06-25	UC Santa Barbara
G	44	Nikola Topić (injured)	6 ft 6 in (1.98 m)	200 lb (91 kg)	2005-08-10	Serbia
G	22	Cason Wallace	6 ft 3 in (1.91 m)	195 lb (88 kg)	2003-11-07	Kentucky
G	21	Aaron Wiggins	6 ft 5 in (1.96 m)	190 lb (86 kg)	1999-01-02	Maryland
F	8	Jalen Williams	6 ft 5 in (1.96 m)	211 lb (96 kg)	2001-04-14	Santa Clara
C	6	Jaylin Williams	6 ft 9 in (2.06 m)	240 lb (109 kg)	2002-06-29	Arkansas
G/F	34	Kenrich Williams	6 ft 6 in (1.98 m)	210 lb (95 kg)	1994-12-02	TCU

Coaches
Head coach
- Mark Daigneault
Assistant(s)
- David Akinyooye
- Dave Bliss
- Chip Engelland
- Grant Gibbs
- Connor Johnson
- Eric Maynor
- Mike Wilks

Legend
- (DP) Unsigned draft pick
- (FA) Free agent
- (S) Suspended
- (GL) On assignment to G League affiliate
- (TW) Two-way affiliate player
- Injured

Roster
Updated: March 23, 2025

== Standings ==
=== Division ===
Northwest Division	W	L	PCT	GB	Home	Road	Div	GP
z – Oklahoma City Thunder	68	14	.829	–	36‍–‍6	32‍–‍8	12‍–‍4	82
x – Denver Nuggets	50	32	.610	18.0	26‍–‍15	24‍–‍17	8‍–‍8	82
x – Minnesota Timberwolves	49	33	.598	19.0	25‍–‍16	24‍–‍17	11‍–‍5	82
Portland Trail Blazers	36	46	.439	32.0	22‍–‍19	14‍–‍27	6‍–‍10	82
Utah Jazz	17	65	.207	51.0	10‍–‍31	7‍–‍34	3‍–‍13	82

=== Conference ===
Western Conference
#	Team	W	L	PCT	GB	GP
1	z – Oklahoma City Thunder *	68	14	.829	–	82
2	y – Houston Rockets *	52	30	.634	16.0	82
3	y – Los Angeles Lakers *	50	32	.610	18.0	82
4	x – Denver Nuggets	50	32	.610	18.0	82
5	x – Los Angeles Clippers	50	32	.610	18.0	82
6	x – Minnesota Timberwolves	49	33	.598	19.0	82
7	x – Golden State Warriors	48	34	.585	20.0	82
8	x – Memphis Grizzlies	48	34	.585	20.0	82
9	pi – Sacramento Kings	40	42	.488	28.0	82
10	pi – Dallas Mavericks	39	43	.476	29.0	82
11	Phoenix Suns	36	46	.439	32.0	82
12	Portland Trail Blazers	36	46	.439	32.0	82
13	San Antonio Spurs	34	48	.415	34.0	82
14	New Orleans Pelicans	21	61	.256	47.0	82
15	Utah Jazz	17	65	.207	51.0	82

== Game log ==
=== Preseason ===
During the preseason, the Thunder would play their final games under what was previously named Bally Sports Oklahoma. Bally Sports would rebrand itself as the FanDuel Sports Network as of October 21, 2024 before the start of the regular season.

2024 preseason game log
Total: 4–1 (Home: 2–1; Road: 2–0)
Preseason: 4–1 (home: 2–1; road: 2–0)

Game	Date	Team	Score	High points	High rebounds	High assists	Location Attendance	Record
1	October 7	@ San Antonio	W 112–107	Ajay Mitchell (19)	Isaiah Hartenstein (8)	Isaiah Hartenstein (7)	Frost Bank Center; 15,393	1–0
2	October 9	Houston	L 113–122 (OT)	Jal. Williams, Gilgeous-Alexander (15)	Isaiah Hartenstein (9)	Shai Gilgeous-Alexander (6)	Paycom Center n/a	1–1
3	October 10	New Zealand	W 117–89	Adam Flagler (25)	Dillon Jones (13)	Ousmane Dieng (8)	BOK Center n/a	2–1
4	October 15	@ Denver	W 124–94	Shai Gilgeous-Alexander (19)	Chet Holmgren (7)	Gilgeous-Alexander, Dieng (5)	Ball Arena; 17,022	3–1
5	October 17	Atlanta	W 104–99	Isaiah Joe (16)	Dillon Jones (10)	Dillon Jones (5)	Paycom Center n/a	4–1

2024–25 preseason schedule

=== Regular season ===
2024–25 game log
Total: 68–14 (Home: 36–6; Road: 32–8)
October: 4–0 (home: 2–0; road: 2–0)

Game	Date	Team	Score	High points	High rebounds	High assists	Location Attendance	Record
1	October 24	@ Denver	W 102–87	Shai Gilgeous-Alexander (28)	Chet Holmgren (14)	Chet Holmgren (5)	Ball Arena; 19,786	1–0
2	October 26	@ Chicago	W 114–95	Jalen Williams (24)	Chet Holmgren (16)	Jalen Williams (8)	United Center; 20,923	2–0
3	October 27	Atlanta	W 128–104	Shai Gilgeous-Alexander (35)	Shai Gilgeous-Alexander (11)	Shai Gilgeous-Alexander (9)	Paycom Center; 18,203	3–0
4	October 30	San Antonio	W 105–93	Luguentz Dort (20)	Jalen Williams (7)	Jalen Williams (8)	Paycom Center; 17,136	4–0

November: 11–4 (home: 6–2; road: 5–2)

Game	Date	Team	Score	High points	High rebounds	High assists	Location Attendance	Record
5	November 1	@ Portland	W 137–114	Shai Gilgeous-Alexander (30)	Aaron Wiggins (8)	Shai Gilgeous-Alexander (6)	Moda Center; 17,815	5–0
6	November 2	@ L.A. Clippers	W 105–92	Shai Gilgeous-Alexander (25)	Chet Holmgren (14)	Shai Gilgeous-Alexander (9)	Intuit Dome; 16,827	6–0
7	November 4	Orlando	W 102–86	Jalen Williams (23)	Chet Holmgren (9)	Shai Gilgeous-Alexander (9)	Paycom Center; 17,044	7–0
8	November 6	@ Denver	L 122–124	Jalen Williams (29)	Holmgren, Jal. Williams (10)	Jalen Williams (9)	Ball Arena; 19,522	7–1
9	November 8	Houston	W 126–107	Gilgeous-Alexander, Holmgren (29)	Isaiah Joe (6)	Ajay Mitchell (7)	Paycom Center; 18,203	8–1
10	November 10	Golden State	L 116–127	Shai Gilgeous-Alexander (24)	Dort, Jones (6)	Caruso, Gilgeous-Alexander, Jal. Williams (4)	Paycom Center; 18,203	8–2
11	November 11	L.A. Clippers	W 134–128	Shai Gilgeous-Alexander (45)	Jalen Williams (8)	Shai Gilgeous-Alexander (9)	Paycom Center; 17,430	9–2
12	November 13	New Orleans	W 106–88	Jalen Williams (31)	Jalen Williams (6)	Jalen Williams (7)	Paycom Center; 17,180	10–2
13	November 15	Phoenix	W 99–83	Shai Gilgeous-Alexander (28)	Luguentz Dort (9)	Shai Gilgeous-Alexander (4)	Paycom Center; 18,203	11–2
14	November 17	Dallas	L 119–121	Shai Gilgeous-Alexander (36)	Dort, Wiggins, Jal. Williams (5)	Shai Gilgeous-Alexander (8)	Paycom Center; 18,203	11–3
15	November 19	@ San Antonio	L 104–110	Shai Gilgeous-Alexander (32)	Luguentz Dort (12)	Gilgeous-Alexander, Wallace (7)	Frost Bank Center; 16,667	11–4
16	November 20	Portland	W 109–99	Jalen Williams (30)	Isaiah Hartenstein (14)	Jalen Williams (8)	Paycom Center; 17,752	12–4
17	November 25	@ Sacramento	W 130–109	Shai Gilgeous-Alexander (37)	Dort, Hartenstein (10)	Shai Gilgeous-Alexander (11)	Golden 1 Center; 17,832	13–4
18	November 27	@ Golden State	W 105–101	Shai Gilgeous-Alexander (35)	Isaiah Hartenstein (14)	Jalen Williams (7)	Chase Center; 18,064	14–4
19	November 29	@ L.A. Lakers	W 101–93	Shai Gilgeous-Alexander (36)	Isaiah Hartenstein (18)	Shai Gilgeous-Alexander (9)	Crypto.com Arena; 18,997	15–4

December : 12–1 (home: 6–0; road: 6–1)

Game	Date	Team	Score	High points	High rebounds	High assists	Location Attendance	Record
20	December 1	@ Houston	L 116–119	Shai Gilgeous-Alexander (32)	Isaiah Hartenstein (13)	Jalen Williams (7)	Toyota Center; 18,055	15–5
21	December 3	Utah	W 133–106	Jalen Williams (28)	Shai Gilgeous-Alexander (6)	Shai Gilgeous-Alexander (7)	Paycom Center; 17,711	16–5
22	December 5	@ Toronto	W 129–92	Shai Gilgeous-Alexander (30)	Isaiah Hartenstein (16)	Isaiah Hartenstein (6)	Scotiabank Arena; 18,356	17–5
23	December 7	@ New Orleans	W 119–109	Shai Gilgeous-Alexander (31)	Isaiah Hartenstein (12)	Hartenstein, Jal. Williams (5)	Smoothie King Center; 15,718	18–5
24	December 10	Dallas	W 118–104	Shai Gilgeous-Alexander (39)	Isaiah Hartenstein (13)	Shai Gilgeous-Alexander (5)	Paycom Center; 17,724	19–5
25	December 14	Houston	W 111–96	Shai Gilgeous-Alexander (32)	Luguentz Dort (9)	Shai Gilgeous-Alexander (6)	T-Mobile Arena (Las Vegas); 17,937	20–5
Cup	December 17	Milwaukee	L 81–97	Shai Gilgeous-Alexander (21)	Isaiah Hartenstein (12)	Jalen Williams (3)	T-Mobile Arena (Las Vegas); 18,519	
26	December 19	@ Orlando	W 105–99	Shai Gilgeous-Alexander (35)	Isaiah Hartenstein (12)	Jalen Williams (7)	Kia Center; 18,896	21–5
27	December 20	@ Miami	W 104–97	Jalen Williams (33)	Isaiah Hartenstein (18)	Alex Caruso (5)	Kaseya Center; 19,801	22–5
28	December 23	Washington	W 123–105	Shai Gilgeous-Alexander (41)	Ajay Mitchell (12)	Caruso, Wallace, Jal. Williams (4)	Paycom Center; 18,203	23–5
29	December 26	@ Indiana	W 120–114	Shai Gilgeous-Alexander (45)	Isaiah Hartenstein (13)	Shai Gilgeous-Alexander (8)	Gainbridge Fieldhouse; 17,274	24–5
30	December 28	@ Charlotte	W 106–94	Shai Gilgeous-Alexander (22)	Isaiah Hartenstein (15)	Gilgeous-Alexander, Jal. Williams, Jay. Williams (6)	Spectrum Center; 19,325	25–5
31	December 29	Memphis	W 130–106	Shai Gilgeous-Alexander (35)	Jalen Williams (10)	Jalen Williams (8)	Paycom Center; 18,203	26–5
32	December 31	Minnesota	W 113–105	Shai Gilgeous-Alexander (40)	Isaiah Hartenstein (10)	Wallace, Jal. Williams (7)	Paycom Center; 18,203	27–5

January: 10–4 (home: 6–1; road: 4–3)

Game	Date	Team	Score	High points	High rebounds	High assists	Location Attendance	Record
33	January 2	L.A. Clippers	W 116–98	Shai Gilgeous-Alexander (29)	Isaiah Hartenstein (9)	Shai Gilgeous-Alexander (8)	Paycom Center; 18,203	28–5
34	January 3	New York	W 117–107	Shai Gilgeous-Alexander (33)	Isaiah Hartenstein (14)	Gilgeous-Alexander, Hartenstein (7)	Paycom Center; 18,203	29–5
35	January 5	Boston	W 105–92	Shai Gilgeous-Alexander (33)	Shai Gilgeous-Alexander (11)	Shai Gilgeous-Alexander (6)	Paycom Center; 18,203	30–5
36	January 8	@ Cleveland	L 122–129	Shai Gilgeous-Alexander (31)	Isaiah Hartenstein (11)	Jalen Williams (9)	Rocket Mortgage FieldHouse; 19,432	30–6
37	January 10	@ New York	W 126–101	Shai Gilgeous-Alexander (39)	Jaylin Williams (10)	Isaiah Hartenstein (6)	Madison Square Garden; 19,812	31–6
38	January 12	@ Washington	W 136–95	Shai Gilgeous-Alexander (27)	Isaiah Hartenstein (12)	Cason Wallace (5)	Capital One Arena; 15,711	32–6
39	January 14	@ Philadelphia	W 118–102	Shai Gilgeous-Alexander (32)	Isaiah Hartenstein (16)	Shai Gilgeous-Alexander (9)	Wells Fargo Center; 19,771	33–6
40	January 16	Cleveland	W 134–114	Shai Gilgeous-Alexander (40)	Wallace, Jal. Williams (6)	Shai Gilgeous-Alexander (8)	Paycom Center; 18,203	34–6
41	January 17	@ Dallas	L 98–106	Jalen Williams (19)	Jaylin Williams (10)	Jalen Williams (6)	American Airlines Center; 20,311	34–7
42	January 19	Brooklyn	W 127–101	Shai Gilgeous-Alexander (27)	Jaylin Williams (8)	Shai Gilgeous-Alexander (10)	Paycom Center; 18,203	35–7
43	January 22	Utah	W 123–114	Shai Gilgeous-Alexander (54)	Shai Gilgeous-Alexander (8)	Caruso, Gilgeous-Alexander (5)	Paycom Center; 17,509	36–7
44	January 23	Dallas	L 115–121	Jalen Williams (33)	Cason Wallace (7)	Gilgeous-Alexander, Jal. Williams (7)	Paycom Center; 18,203	36–8
45	January 26	@ Portland	W 118–108	Shai Gilgeous-Alexander (35)	Isaiah Hartenstein (12)	Jalen Williams (8)	Moda Center; 17,619	37–8
46	January 29	@ Golden State	L 109–116	Shai Gilgeous-Alexander (52)	Isaiah Hartenstein (18)	Isaiah Hartenstein (6)	Chase Center; 18,064	37–9

February: 11–2 (home: 6–1; road: 5–1)

Game	Date	Team	Score	High points	High rebounds	High assists	Location Attendance	Record
47	February 1	Sacramento	W 144–110	Aaron Wiggins (41)	Isaiah Hartenstein (15)	Shai Gilgeous-Alexander (9)	Paycom Center; 18,203	38–9
48	February 3	Milwaukee	W 125–96	Shai Gilgeous-Alexander (34)	Isaiah Hartenstein (12)	Shai Gilgeous-Alexander (6)	Paycom Center; 17,677	39–9
49	February 5	Phoenix	W 140–109	Shai Gilgeous-Alexander (50)	Jaylin Williams (12)	Shai Gilgeous-Alexander (5)	Paycom Center; 17,451	40–9
50	February 7	Toronto	W 121–109	Jalen Williams (27)	Hartenstein, Caruso, Jay. Williams (6)	Shai Gilgeous-Alexander (6)	Paycom Center; 18,203	41–9
51	February 8	@ Memphis	W 125–112	Shai Gilgeous-Alexander (32)	Isaiah Hartenstein (14)	Shai Gilgeous-Alexander (8)	FedExForum; 17,794	42–9
52	February 10	New Orleans	W 137–101	Shai Gilgeous-Alexander (31)	Isaiah Hartenstein (13)	Caruso, Jones, Jal. Williams (5)	Paycom Center; 17,340	43–9
53	February 12	Miami	W 115–101	Shai Gilgeous-Alexander (32)	Isaiah Hartenstein (8)	Shai Gilgeous-Alexander (9)	Paycom Center; 17,835	44–9
54	February 13	@ Minnesota	L 101–116	Shai Gilgeous-Alexander (24)	Holmgren, Hartenstein (12)	Shai Gilgeous-Alexander (9)	Target Center; 18,978	44–10
All-Star Game
55	February 21	@ Utah	W 130–107	Shai Gilgeous-Alexander (21)	Isaiah Hartenstein (13)	Shai Gilgeous-Alexander (8)	Delta Center; 18,175	45–10
56	February 23	@ Minnesota	W 130–123	Shai Gilgeous-Alexander (37)	Isaiah Hartenstein (9)	Jalen Williams (9)	Target Center; 18,978	46–10
57	February 24	Minnesota	L 128–131 (OT)	Shai Gilgeous-Alexander (39)	Shai Gilgeous-Alexander (10)	Shai Gilgeous-Alexander (8)	Paycom Center; 18,203	46–11
58	February 26	@ Brooklyn	W 129–121	Shai Gilgeous-Alexander (27)	Chet Holmgren (17)	Shai Gilgeous-Alexander (5)	Barclays Center; 17,926	47–11
59	February 28	@ Atlanta	W 135–119	Shai Gilgeous-Alexander (31)	Isaiah Hartenstein (10)	Jalen Williams (8)	State Farm Arena; 17,712	48–11

March : 15–1 (home: 8–1; road: 7–0)

Game	Date	Team	Score	High points	High rebounds	High assists	Location Attendance	Record
60	March 2	@ San Antonio	W 146–132	Jalen Williams (41)	Isaiah Hartenstein (11)	Shai Gilgeous-Alexander (8)	Frost Bank Center; 17,745	49–11
61	March 3	Houston	W 137–128	Shai Gilgeous-Alexander (51)	Chet Holmgren (11)	Shai Gilgeous-Alexander (7)	Paycom Center; 17,714	50–11
62	March 5	@ Memphis	W 120–103	Shai Gilgeous-Alexander (41)	Isaiah Hartenstein (15)	Jalen Williams (9)	FedExForum; 16,723	51–11
63	March 7	Portland	W 107–89	Aaron Wiggins (30)	Jaylin Williams (11)	Jaylin Williams (11)	Paycom Center; 17,911	52–11
64	March 9	Denver	W 127–103	Shai Gilgeous-Alexander (40)	Isaiah Hartenstein (11)	Jalen Williams (8)	Paycom Center; 18,203	53–11
65	March 10	Denver	L 127–140	Luguentz Dort (26)	Dort, Hartenstein (7)	Cason Wallace (8)	Paycom Center; 18,203	53–12
66	March 12	@ Boston	W 118–112	Shai Gilgeous-Alexander (34)	Chet Holmgren (15)	Shai Gilgeous-Alexander (7)	TD Garden; 19,156	54–12
67	March 15	@ Detroit	W 113–107	Shai Gilgeous-Alexander (48)	Isaiah Hartenstein (10)	Shai Gilgeous-Alexander (6)	Little Caesars Arena; 20,062	55–12
68	March 16	@ Milwaukee	W 121–105	Shai Gilgeous-Alexander (31)	Isaiah Hartenstein (12)	Shai Gilgeous-Alexander (8)	Fiserv Forum; 17,341	56–12
69	March 19	Philadelphia	W 133–100	Aaron Wiggins (26)	Jaylin Williams (17)	Jaylin Williams (11)	Paycom Center; 18,203	57–12
70	March 21	Charlotte	W 141–106	Shai Gilgeous-Alexander (30)	Isaiah Hartenstein (10)	Shai Gilgeous-Alexander (9)	Paycom Center; 18,203	58–12
71	March 23	@ L.A. Clippers	W 103–101	Shai Gilgeous-Alexander (26)	Isaiah Hartenstein (10)	Shai Gilgeous-Alexander (8)	Intuit Dome; 17,927	59–12
72	March 25	@ Sacramento	W 121–105	Shai Gilgeous-Alexander (32)	Hartenstein, Holmgren (10)	Caruso, Williams (6)	Golden 1 Center; 16,060	60–12
73	March 27	Memphis	W 125–104	Shai Gilgeous-Alexander (37)	Isaiah Hartenstein (11)	Shai Gilgeous-Alexander (6)	Paycom Center; 18,203	61–12
74	March 29	Indiana	W 132–111	Shai Gilgeous-Alexander (33)	Kenrich Williams (8)	Shai Gilgeous-Alexander (8)	Paycom Center; 18,203	62–12
75	March 31	Chicago	W 145–117	Isaiah Joe (31)	Isaiah Hartenstein (7)	Shai Gilgeous-Alexander (12)	Paycom Center; 18,203	63–12

April : 5–2 (home: 2–1; road: 3–1)

Game	Date	Team	Score	High points	High rebounds	High assists	Location Attendance	Record
76	April 2	Detroit	W 119–103	Shai Gilgeous-Alexander (33)	Chet Holmgren (11)	Isaiah Hartenstein (6)	Paycom Center; 18,203	64–12
77	April 4	@ Houston	L 111–125	Jalen Williams (33)	Isaiah Hartenstein (7)	Shai Gilgeous-Alexander (8)	Toyota Center; 18,055	64–13
78	April 6	L.A. Lakers	L 99–126	Shai Gilgeous-Alexander (26)	Hartenstein, Jal. Williams (6)	Shai Gilgeous-Alexander (9)	Paycom Center; 18,203	64–14
79	April 8	L.A. Lakers	W 136–120	Shai Gilgeous-Alexander (42)	Isaiah Hartenstein (15)	Shai Gilgeous-Alexander (6)	Paycom Center; 18,203	65–14
80	April 9	@ Phoenix	W 125–112	Jalen Williams (33)	Chet Holmgren (10)	Jalen Williams (5)	PHX Arena; 17,071	66–14
81	April 11	@ Utah	W 145–111	Aaron Wiggins (35)	Jaylin Williams (11)	Jaylin Williams (10)	Delta Center; 18,175	67–14
82	April 13	@ New Orleans	W 115–100	Aaron Wiggins (28)	Kenrich Williams (12)	Aaron Wiggins (7)	Smoothie King Center; 17,761	68–14

2024–25 season schedule

=== Playoffs ===
2025 playoff game log
Total: 16–7 (home: 11–2; road: 5–5)
First Round: 4–0 (home: 2–0; road: 2–0)

Game	Date	Team	Score	High points	High rebounds	High assists	Location Attendance	Series
1	April 20	Memphis	W 131–80	Aaron Wiggins (21)	Chet Holmgren (10)	Jalen Williams (6)	Paycom Center; 18,203	1–0
2	April 22	Memphis	W 118–99	Shai Gilgeous-Alexander (27)	Chet Holmgren (11)	Gilgeous-Alexander, Jal. Williams (7)	Paycom Center; 18,203	2–0
3	April 24	@ Memphis	W 114–108	Shai Gilgeous-Alexander (31)	Chet Holmgren (8)	Shai Gilgeous-Alexander (8)	FedExForum; 16,849	3–0
4	April 26	@ Memphis	W 117–115	Shai Gilgeous-Alexander (38)	Isaiah Hartenstein (12)	Shai Gilgeous-Alexander (6)	FedExForum; 16,667	4–0

Conference Semifinals: 4–3 (home: 3–1; road: 1–2)

Game	Date	Team	Score	High points	High rebounds	High assists	Location Attendance	Series
1	May 5	Denver	L 119–121	Shai Gilgeous-Alexander (33)	Shai Gilgeous-Alexander (10)	Shai Gilgeous-Alexander (8)	Paycom Center; 18,203	0–1
2	May 7	Denver	W 149–106	Shai Gilgeous-Alexander (34)	Chet Holmgren (11)	Shai Gilgeous-Alexander (8)	Paycom Center; 18,203	1–1
3	May 9	@ Denver	L 104–113 (OT)	Jalen Williams (32)	Chet Holmgren (16)	Shai Gilgeous-Alexander (7)	Ball Arena; 19,993	1–2
4	May 11	@ Denver	W 92–87	Shai Gilgeous-Alexander (25)	Isaiah Hartenstein (14)	Shai Gilgeous-Alexander (6)	Ball Arena; 19,995	2–2
5	May 13	Denver	W 112–105	Shai Gilgeous-Alexander (31)	Jalen Williams (9)	Shai Gilgeous-Alexander (7)	Paycom Center; 18,203	3–2
6	May 15	@ Denver	L 107–119	Shai Gilgeous-Alexander (32)	Chet Holmgren (11)	Jalen Williams (10)	Ball Arena; 19,998	3–3
7	May 18	Denver	W 125–93	Shai Gilgeous-Alexander (35)	Chet Holmgren (11)	Jalen Williams (7)	Paycom Center; 18,203	4–3

Conference Finals: 4–1 (home: 3–0; road: 1–1)

Game	Date	Team	Score	High points	High rebounds	High assists	Location Attendance	Series
1	May 20	Minnesota	W 114–88	Shai Gilgeous-Alexander (31)	Jal. Williams, Joe (8)	Shai Gilgeous-Alexander (9)	Paycom Center; 18,203	1–0
2	May 22	Minnesota	W 118–103	Shai Gilgeous-Alexander (38)	Jalen Williams (10)	Shai Gilgeous-Alexander (8)	Paycom Center; 18,203	2–0
3	May 24	@ Minnesota	L 101–143	Gilgeous-Alexander, Mitchell (14)	Isaiah Hartenstein (6)	Shai Gilgeous-Alexander (6)	Target Center; 19,112	2–1
4	May 26	@ Minnesota	W 128–126	Shai Gilgeous-Alexander (40)	Shai Gilgeous-Alexander (9)	Shai Gilgeous-Alexander (10)	Target Center; 19,250	3–1
5	May 28	Minnesota	W 124–94	Shai Gilgeous-Alexander (34)	Jalen Williams (8)	Shai Gilgeous-Alexander (8)	Paycom Center; 18,203	4–1

NBA Finals: 4–3 (home: 3–1; road: 1–2)

Game	Date	Team	Score	High points	High rebounds	High assists	Location Attendance	Series
1	June 5	Indiana	L 110–111	Shai Gilgeous-Alexander (38)	Isaiah Hartenstein (9)	Jalen Williams (6)	Paycom Center; 18,203	0–1
2	June 8	Indiana	W 123–107	Shai Gilgeous-Alexander (34)	Isaiah Hartenstein (8)	Shai Gilgeous-Alexander (8)	Paycom Center; 18,203	1–1
3	June 11	@ Indiana	L 107–116	Jalen Williams (26)	Chet Holmgren (10)	Caruso, Gilgeous-Alexander (4)	Gainbridge Fieldhouse; 17,274	1–2
4	June 13	@ Indiana	W 111–104	Shai Gilgeous-Alexander (35)	Chet Holmgren (15)	Jalen Williams (3)	Gainbridge Fieldhouse; 17,274	2–2
5	June 16	Indiana	W 120–109	Jalen Williams (40)	Chet Holmgren (11)	Shai Gilgeous-Alexander (10)	Paycom Center; 18,203	3–2
6	June 19	@ Indiana	L 91–108	Shai Gilgeous-Alexander (21)	Chet Holmgren (6)	Ajay Mitchell (4)	Gainbridge Fieldhouse; 17,274	3–3
7	June 22	Indiana	W 103–91	Shai Gilgeous-Alexander (29)	Isaiah Hartenstein (9)	Shai Gilgeous-Alexander (12)	Paycom Center; 18,203	4–3

2025 playoff schedule

=== NBA Cup ===
The groups were revealed during the tournament announcement on July 12, 2024.

==== West Group B ====
Pos	Team	Pld	W	L	PF	PA	PD	Qualification
1	Oklahoma City Thunder	4	3	1	437	392	+45	Advance to knockout stage
2	Phoenix Suns	4	3	1	434	404	+30	
3	Los Angeles Lakers	4	2	2	437	461	−24	
4	San Antonio Spurs	4	2	2	446	443	+3	
5	Utah Jazz	4	0	4	451	505	−54	

Source: NBA
Rules for classification: Tiebreakers

== Injuries ==
Player	Duration		Injury	Games missed
Player	Start	End	Injury	Games missed
Nikola Topić	July 7, 2024	2025 NBA Summer League	Torn Left ACL Surgery	82 (+23) (Note: Topić missed 23 playoff games)
Kenrich Williams	September 17, 2024	November 11, 2024	Right knee surgery	10
Jaylin Williams	October 3, 2024	December 22, 2024	Right hamstring strain	27
Isaiah Hartenstein	October 17, 2024	November 20, 2024	Left hand fracture	15
Chet Holmgren	November 11, 2024	February 6, 2025	Right Iliac Wing Fracture	39
Alex Caruso	November 15, 2024	November 19,2024	Right Hip Soreness	2
Isaiah Joe	November 19, 2024	November 25, 2024	Left Calf Contusion	2
Alex Caruso	November 24, 2024	December 5, 2024	Right Hip Strain	5
Ousmane Dieng	November 25, 2024	December 19, 2024	Right ring finger small Fracture	10
Adam Flagler	November 27, 2024	December 19, 2024	Right Hand Contusion	9
Alex Ducas	December 7, 2024	December 19, 2024	Lower Back Sprain	4
Branden Carlson	December 23, 2024	December 29, 2024	Concussion Protocol	3
Alex Caruso	December 25, 2024	January 14, 2025	Left Hip Strain	10
Luguentz Dort	December 27, 2024	December 28, 2024	Right Ankle Sprain	1
Cason Wallace	December 27, 2024	December 28, 2024	Left Quad Contusion	1
Ajay Mitchell	January 4th, 2025	April 11, 2025	Right Great Toe Surgery	46
Alex Caruso	January 7, 2025	January 13, 2025	Right Hip Soreness	2
Isaiah Hartenstein	January 16, 2025	January 29, 2025	Left Soleus Strain	5
Shai Gilgeous-Alexander	January 17, 2025	January 19, 2025	Right Wrist Sprain	1
Jalen Williams	January 19, 2025	January 22, 2025	Right Hip Strain	1
Luguentz Dort	January 26, 2025	January 29, 2025	Right Knee Soreness	1
Alex Caruso	February 1, 2025	February 5, 2025	Left Ankle Sprain	2
Jalen Williams	February 1, 2025	February 5, 2025	Right Wrist Sprain	2
Cason Wallace	February 5, 2025	February 21, 2025	Right Shoulder Strain	6
Ousmane Dieng	February 6, 2025	February 21, 2025	Right Soleus Strain	5
Luguentz Dort	February 7, 2025	February 9, 2025	Lower Back Spasms	2
Isaiah Joe	February 9, 2025	February 21, 2025	Right Knee Soreness	3
Alex Caruso	February 13, 2025	February 21, 2025	Left Hip Tightness	1
Isaiah Joe	March 3, 2025	March 5, 2025	Lower Back Soreness	1
Alex Caruso	March 5, 2025	March 7, 2025	Left Ankle Sprain	1
Chet Holmgren	March 5, 2025	March 9, 2025	Right Lower Leg Contusion	2
Luguentz Dort	March 7, 2025	March 9, 2025	Right Patellofemoral Soreness	1
Isaiah Hartenstein	March 7, 2025	March 9, 2025	Nasal Fracture Re injury	1
Cason Wallace	March 7, 2025	March 9, 2025	Right Knee Contusion	1
Jalen Williams	March 7, 2025	March 9, 2025	Right Wrist Sprain	1
Alex Caruso	March 12, 2025	March 15, 2025	Illness	1
Jalen Williams	March 12, 2025	March 27, 2025	Right Hip Strain	7
Aaron Wiggins	March 15, 2025	March 16, 2025	Illness	1
Ousmane Dieng	March 16, 2025	May 4, 2025	Left Calf Strain	19
Luguentz Dort	March 16, 2025	March 23, 2025	Right Hip Soreness	2
Isaiah Hartenstein	March 19, 2025	March 21, 2025	Lower Back Spasms	1
Cason Wallace	March 19, 2025	March 21, 2025	Right Shoulder Strain	1
Alex Ducas	March 22, 2025	April 11, 2025	Right Quad Strain	10
Chet Holmgren	March 23, 2025	March 25, 2025	Left Hip Strain	1
Cason Wallace	March 25, 2025	March 27, 2025	Left Knee Contusion	1
Aaron Wiggins	March 25, 2025	April 4, 2025	Left Achilles Tendinitis	5
Chet Holmgren	March 29, 2025	March 31, 2025	Left Hip Injury Management	1
Jaylin Williams	March 29, 2025	March 31, 2025	Left Hip Tightness	1
Alex Caruso	April 2, 2025	April 4, 2025	Left Ankle Soreness	1
Isaiah Joe	April 4, 2025	April 6, 2025	Right Knee Soreness	1
Jaylin Williams	April 4, 2025	April 9, 2025	Left Ankle Sprain	3
Shai Gilgeous-Alexander	April 9, 2025	April 13, 2025	Left Shin Contusion	3
Isaiah Hartenstein	April 9, 2025	April 13, 2025	Left Achilles Tendinitis	3
Cason Wallace	April 9, 2025	April 13, 2025	Right Shoulder Strain	3
Alex Caruso	April 11, 2025	April 13, 2025	Right Ankle Sprain	2
Luguentz Dort	April 11, 2025	April 13, 2025	Right Patellofemoral Injury Management	2
Chet Holmgren	April 11, 2025	April 13, 2025	Low Back Spasm	2
Jalen Williams	April 11, 2025	April 13, 2025	Right Hip Strain	2

a: Nikola Topić sustained a Torn ACL in his left knee prior to the start of the season and missed the entire 2024-25 season

== G League assignments ==
Player	Duration	
Player	Start	End
Dillon Jones	October 29, 2024	October 29, 2024
Kenrich Williams	October 30, 2024	October 30, 2024
Dillon Jones	November 5, 2024	November 5, 2024
Malevy Leons	November 5, 2024	November 5, 2024
Dillon Jones	November 9, 2024	November 9, 2024
Malevy Leons	November 9, 2024	November 9, 2024
Kenrich Williams	November 9, 2024	November 9, 2024
Malevy Leons	November 10, 2024	November 12, 2024
Branden Carlson	November 21, 2024	November 22, 2024
Dillon Jones	November 22, 2024	November 22, 2024
Ousmane Dieng	November 22, 2024	November 22, 2024
Branden Carlson	December 30, 2024	December 30, 2024
Dillon Jones	December 30, 2024	December 30, 2024
Ousmane Dieng	December 30, 2024	December 30, 2024
Branden Carlson	January 2, 2025	January 2, 2025
Dillon Jones	January 2, 2025	January 2, 2025
Ousmane Dieng	January 2, 2025	January 2, 2025
Branden Carlson	January 4, 2025	January 4, 2025
Dillon Jones	January 4, 2025	January 4, 2025
Ousmane Dieng	January 4, 2025	January 4, 2025
Ousmane Dieng	January 5, 2025	January 16, 2025
Dillon Jones	January 5, 2025	January 17, 2025
Branden Carlson	January 25, 2025	January 25, 2025
Dillon Jones	January 25, 2025	February 3, 2025
Dillon Jones	February 25, 2025	February 1, 2025
Dillon Jones	March 4, 2025	March 7, 2025
Dillon Jones	March 9, 2025	March 10, 2025
Dillon Jones	March 11, 2025	March 15, 2025
Dillon Jones	March 21, 2025	March 21, 2025

Source: NBA G League Transactions

== Player statistics ==
Legend
GP	Games played	GS	Games started	MPG	Minutes per game
FG%	Field goal percentage	3P%	3-point field goal percentage	FT%	Free throw percentage
RPG	Rebounds per game	APG	Assists per game	SPG	Steals per game
BPG	Blocks per game	PPG	Points per game	**Bold**	Career high

Sabremetrics
TS%	True shooting percentage	eFG%	Effective field goal percentage	ORB%	Offensive rebound percentage
DRB%	Defensive rebound percentage	TRB%	Total rebound percentage	AST%	Assist percentage
STL%	Steal percentage	BLK%	Block percentage	TOV%	Turnover percentage
USG%	Usage percentage	ORtg	Offensive rating	DRtg	Defensive rating
PER	Player efficiency rating

=== Preseason ===
Player	GP	GS	MPG	FG%	3P%	FT%	RPG	APG	SPG	BPG	PPG
Alex Caruso	4	0	16.5	53.3%	16.7%	66.7%	1.8	2.3	0.8	0.8	4.8
Ousmane Dieng	5	2	26.0	42.2%	33.3%	69.2%	6.4	3.6	0.2	1.2	11.0
Luguentz Dort	3	3	19.1	46.2%	20.0%	100%	2.7	1.7	0.7	1.0	5.0
Alex Ducas	5	1	16.1	39.3%	27.8%	50.0%	1.6	0.6	0.4	0.4	5.8
Adam Flagler	5	1	17.4	38.9%	37.5%	100%	1.6	1.2	0.6	0.0	7.8
Shai Gilgeous-Alexander	3	3	19.4	61.9%	63.6%	100%	3.0	4.0	1.3	0.7	13.3
Isaiah Hartenstein	3	1	18.0	53.3%	0.0%	45.5%	7.3	4.0	1.0	0.7	7.0
Chet Holmgren	4	4	15.1	50.0%	37.5%	62.5%	4.5	1.3	0.5	1.3	10.8
Isaiah Joe	4	0	17.5	41.5%	33.3%	0.0%	3.0	1.8	0.3	0.0	11.0
Dillon Jones	5	1	23.5	47.8%	46.7%	83.3%	6.6	3.6	1.8	0.6	11.2
Miller Kopp ^{T}	1	0	14.4	50.0%	100%	–	6.0	1.0	0.0	0.0	3.0
Malevy Leons	4	1	13.5	69.2%	0.0%	100%	3.8	0.8	1.5	0.3	5.0
Ajay Mitchell	4	0	20.8	52.6%	16.7%	57.1%	2.0	2.0	1.0	0.0	11.5
Alex Reese	3	0	8.7	33.3%	20.0%	100%	2.0	1.0	0.3	0.3	2.3
Cormac Ryan ^{T}	3	0	10.3	50.0%	50.0%	–	0.7	1.0	0.3	0.0	5.0
Cason Wallace	4	2	22.4	42.9%	23.1%	–	4.8	2.0	1.8	0.3	6.8
Aaron Wiggins	4	1	19.9	48.3%	27.3%	40.0%	3.8	2.5	1.5	0.3	8.3
Jalen Williams	4	4	16.7	54.8%	52.9%	75.0%	2.5	2.0	0.3	0.3	14.5

Led team in statistic

Source: RealGM
^{T} Waived/Traded after preseason

=== Regular season ===
Player	GP	GS	MPG	FG%	3P%	FT%	RPG	APG	SPG	BPG	PPG
Branden Carlson	32	0	7.7	44.3%	33.3%	77.8%	1.7	0.4	0.2	0.7	3.8
Alex Caruso	54	3	19.3	44.6%	35.3%	82.4%	2.9	2.5	1.6	0.6	7.1
Ousmane Dieng	37	1	10.9	43.2%	32.4%	68.8%	2.2	0.8	0.5	0.2	3.8
Luguentz Dort	71	71	29.2	43.5%	41.2%	71.7%	4.1	1.6	1.1	0.6	10.1
Alex Ducas	21	0	6.0	40.0%	47.6%	100%	1.2	0.2	0.2	0.0	1.7
Adam Flagler	37	0	5.5	26.0%	19.4%	50.0%	0.7	0.3	0.2	0.1	1.8
Shai Gilgeous-Alexander	76	76	34.2	51.9%	37.5%	89.8%	5.0	6.4	1.7	1.0	32.7
Isaiah Hartenstein	57	53	27.9	58.1%	0.0%	67.5%	10.7	3.8	0.8	1.1	11.2
Chet Holmgren	32	32	27.4	49.0%	37.9%	75.4%	8.0	2.0	0.7	2.2	15.0
Isaiah Joe	74	16	21.7	44.0%	41.2%	82.1%	2.6	1.6	0.6	0.1	10.2
Dillon Jones	54	3	10.2	38.3%	25.4%	60.7%	2.2	1.1	0.3	0.1	2.5
Malevy Leons ^{‡}	6	0	3.5	0.0%	0.0%	50.0%	0.5	0.2	0.0	0.0	0.3
Ajay Mitchell	36	1	16.6	49.5%	38.3%	82.9%	1.9	1.8	0.7	0.1	6.5
Alex Reese ^{‡}	1	0	2.0	100%	–	–	1.0	0.0	0.0	0.0	2.0
Cason Wallace	68	42	27.6	47.4%	35.6%	81.1%	3.4	2.5	1.8	0.5	8.4
Aaron Wiggins	76	26	22.9	48.8%	38.3%	83.1%	3.9	1.8	0.8	0.2	12.0
Jalen Williams	69	69	32.4	48.4%	36.5%	78.9%	5.3	5.1	1.6	0.7	21.6
Jaylin Williams	47	9	16.7	43.9%	39.9%	76.7%	5.6	2.6	0.5	0.6	5.9
Kenrich Williams	69	7	16.4	48.3%	38.6%	71.8%	3.5	1.4	0.6	0.1	6.3

Led team in statistic

Source: Basketball-Reference
^{‡} Waived during the season
^{†} Traded during the season
^{≠} Acquired during the season

=== Playoffs ===
Player	GP	GS	MPG	FG%	3P%	FT%	RPG	APG	SPG	BPG	PPG
Alex Caruso	23	0	24.4	45.0%	41.1%	79.5%	2.7	2.2	2.0	0.6	9.2
Ousmane Dieng	9	0	3.6	40.0%	57.1%	100%	0.4	0.3	0.0	0.1	1.6
Luguentz Dort	23	23	29.0	36.6%	34.3%	63.6%	3.9	0.9	1.3	0.4	7.9
Shai Gilgeous-Alexander	23	23	37.0	46.2%	28.3%	87.6%	5.3	6.5	1.7	0.9	29.9
Isaiah Hartenstein	23	20	22.4	61.9%	–	66.7%	7.5	2.2	0.8	0.5	8.1
Chet Holmgren	23	23	29.8	46.2%	29.7%	78.4%	8.7	1.0	0.7	1.9	15.2
Isaiah Joe	21	0	10.0	49.3%	41.1%	85.7%	1.4	0.7	0.3	0.1	5.1
Dillon Jones	10	0	4.6	81.8%	75.0%	100%	0.9	0.5	0.1	0.1	2.3
Ajay Mitchell	12	0	7.0	45.7%	38.5%	80.0%	0.8	0.8	0.2	0.0	3.4
Cason Wallace	23	3	22.4	42.9%	32.3%	66.7%	2.7	2.1	1.4	0.4	5.6
Aaron Wiggins	22	0	13.8	39.5%	36.2%	76.5%	2.3	0.9	0.5	0.3	6.0
Jalen Williams	23	23	34.6	44.9%	30.4%	78.9%	5.5	4.8	1.4	0.4	21.4
Jaylin Williams	17	0	8.3	42.9%	36.0%	54.5%	1.9	1.0	0.5	0.1	2.6
Kenrich Williams	16	0	8.6	40.0%	20.0%	50.0%	2.2	0.4	0.4	0.1	2.4

Led team in statistic

=== Individual game highs ===
Category	Player	Statistic
Points	Shai Gilgeous-Alexander	54 vs Jazz on January 22, 2025
Rebounds	Isaiah Hartenstein	18 vs Lakers on November 29, 2024; 18 vs Heat on December 20, 2024; 18 vs Warriors on January 29, 2025
Assists	Shai Gilgeous-Alexander	12 vs Bulls on March 31, 2025
Steals	Shai Gilgeous-Alexander; Cason Wallace; Alex Caruso	5 vs Clippers on November 11, 2024; 5 vs Pelicans on November 13, 2024; 5 vs Suns on April 9, 2025
Blocks	Chet Holmgren	6 vs Hawks on October 27, 2024; 6 vs Detroit on April 2, 2025

== Transactions ==
=== Overview ===
Players Added

Via draft

- Nikola Topić

Via trade

- Alex Caruso
- Dillon Jones
  (Draft rights)
- Ajay Mitchell
  (Draft rights)

Via free agency

- Alex Ducas
- Isaiah Hartenstein
- Alex Reese
Players Lost

Via trade

- Josh Giddey
- Lindy Waters III

Via free agency

- Bismack Biyombo
- Keyontae Johnson
- Olivier Sarr

Via retirement

- Gordon Hayward
- Mike Muscala

=== Trades ===
June 21, 2024	To Oklahoma City Thunder; Alex Caruso	To Chicago Bulls; Josh Giddey
June 26, 2024	To Oklahoma City Thunder; Draft rights to Dillon Jones	To New York Knicks; Five second-round picks
June 27, 2024	To Oklahoma City Thunder; Draft rights to Quinten Post (No. 52)	To Golden State Warriors; Lindy Waters III
June 27, 2024	To Oklahoma City Thunder; Draft rights to Oso Ighodaro (No. 40)	To Golden State Warriors; Draft rights to Quinten Post (No. 52); Cash considerations
June 27, 2024	To Oklahoma City Thunder; Draft rights to Ajay Mitchell (No. 38)	To New York Knicks; Draft rights to Oso Ighodaro (No. 40); Cash considerations

=== Free agency ===
==== Re-signings ====
Date	Player	Contract
July 7, 2024	Isaiah Joe	Multi-Year
July 7, 2024	Aaron Wiggins	Multi-Year

==== Additions ====
Date	Player	Contract	Former team
July 6, 2024	Isaiah Hartenstein	Multi-Year	New York Knicks
July 16, 2024	Alex Ducas	Two-Way	Saint Mary's Gaels (NCAA)
October 19, 2024	Alex Reese	Standard	Rip City Remix (G League)
In-Season Additions
October 31, 2024	Malevy Leons	Standard	Bradley Braves (NCAA)
November 16, 2024	Branden Carlson	Standard	Raptors 905 (G League)

==== Subtractions ====
Date	Player	Reason	New team
June 30, 2024	Bismack Biyombo	Free Agent	San Antonio Spurs
June 30, 2024	Gordon Hayward	Retired	N/A
June 30, 2024	Keyontae Johnson	Free Agent	Greensboro Swarm (G League)
June 30, 2024	Mike Muscala	Retired	N/A
June 30, 2024	Olivier Sarr	Free Agent	Raptors 905 (G League)
In-Season Subtractions
October 31, 2024	Alex Reese	Waived	Rip City Remix (G League)
November 15, 2024	Malevy Leons	Waived	Oklahoma City Blue (G League)
