= Dillon Jones =

American basketball player (born 2001)

No. 2 – Delaware Blue Coats
- Position: Small forward
- League: NBA G League

Personal information
- Born: October 29, 2001 (age 25) Columbia, South Carolina, U.S.
- Listed height: 6 ft 5 in (1.96 m)
- Listed weight: 235 lb (107 kg)

Career information
- High school: Keenan (Columbia, South Carolina); Sunrise Christian Academy (Bel Aire, Kansas)
- College: Weber State (2020–2024)
- NBA draft: 2024: 1st round, 26th overall pick
- Drafted by: Washington Wizards
- Playing career: 2024–present

Career history
- 2024–2025: Oklahoma City Thunder
- 2024–2025: →Oklahoma City Blue
- 2025–2026: Rip City Remix
- 2026: New York Knicks
- 2026: →Westchester Knicks
- 2026–present: Delaware Blue Coats

Career highlights
- 2× NBA champion (2025, 2026); Big Sky Player of the Year (2024); 3× First-team All-Big Sky (2022–2024); Big Sky Freshman of the Year (2021)
- Stats at NBA.com
- Stats at Basketball Reference

Dillon Keshaun Jones (born October 29, 2001) is an American basketball player for the Delaware Blue Coats of the NBA G League. He played college basketball for the Weber State Wildcats.

== Early life and high school career ==
Jones grew up in Columbia, South Carolina and initially attended Keenan High School. He averaged 12.3 points, 7.9 rebounds, and 4.9 assists per game as a junior. Jones transferred to Sunrise Christian Academy in Bel Aire, Kansas before the start of his senior year.

== College career ==
During his freshman season with the Weber State Wildcats, Jones played in all 23 games and was named the Big Sky Conference Freshman of the Year after averaging 8.2 points and 5.8 rebounds per game and leading the conference with 37 total steals and 1.6 steals per game. He was named first team All-Big Sky as a sophomore after averaging 12.6 points and a conference-high 10.6 rebounds per game and finishing third with 1.8 steals per game. Jones repeated as a first team All-Big Sky selection after leading the conference again with 10.9 rebounds per game while also averaging 16.7 points and 1.6 steals per game. After the season he entered his name into the 2023 NBA draft and was invited to both the NBA and NBA G League combines. Jones ultimately withdrew in order to return to Weber State for his senior season.

== Professional career ==
=== Oklahoma City Thunder / Oklahoma City Blue (2024–2025) ===
Jones was selected with the 26th overall pick by the Washington Wizards in the 2024 NBA draft. His draft rights were traded later that day along with the 51st pick in the 2024 draft to the New York Knicks in exchange for the draft rights to Kyshawn George. The Knicks immediately traded Jones's draft rights to the Oklahoma City Thunder for five future second-round draft picks. On July 6, he signed a multi-year contract with the Thunder and throughout his rookie season, he has been assigned several times to the Oklahoma City Blue. During the 2024–25 season, Jones, along with the rest of the Thunder team, won the 2025 NBA Finals, beating the Indiana Pacers in seven.

=== Rip City Remix (2025–2026) ===
On June 28, 2025, Jones was traded alongside a 2029 second-round pick back to the Washington Wizards in exchange for Colby Jones. He was waived by the Wizards prior to the start of the regular season on October 19.

On October 25, 2025, Jones was selected first overall by the South Bay Lakers in 2025 NBA G League draft. Two days later, prior to the 2025–26 season, Jones was traded to the roster of the Portland Trail Blazers' NBA G League affiliate, the Rip City Remix.

=== New York / Westchester Knicks (2026) ===
On January 20, 2026, Jones signed a two-way contract with the New York Knicks, splitting time with their NBA G League affiliate the Westchester Knicks. On June 13, Jones won his second consecutive NBA Finals championship as the Knicks beat the San Antonio Spurs in five games.

=== Delaware Blue Coats (2026–present) ===
On September 8, 2026, Jones signed an Exhibit 10 contract with the Philadelphia 76ers.

== Career statistics ==
Legend
GP	Games played	GS	Games started	MPG	Minutes per game
FG%	Field goal percentage	3P%	3-point field goal percentage	FT%	Free throw percentage
RPG	Rebounds per game	APG	Assists per game	SPG	Steals per game
BPG	Blocks per game	PPG	Points per game	**Bold**	Career high
†	Won an NBA championship

=== NBA ===
==== Regular season ====
Year	Team	GP	GS	MPG	FG%	3P%	FT%	RPG	APG	SPG	BPG	PPG
2024–25†	Oklahoma City	**54**	**3**	**10.2**	**.383**	**.254**	.607	**2.2**	**1.1**	.3	**.1**	**2.5**
2025–26†	New York	7	0	5.6	.222	.200	**1.000**	1.0	.6	**.4**	.0	1.3
Career		61	3	9.7	.373	.250	.656	2.1	1.0	.3	.1	2.4

==== Playoffs ====
Year	Team	GP	GS	MPG	FG%	3P%	FT%	RPG	APG	SPG	BPG	PPG
2025†	Oklahoma City	10	0	4.6	.818	.750	1.000	.9	.5	.1	.1	2.3
Career		10	0	4.6	.818	.750	1.000	.9	.5	.1	.1	2.3

=== College ===
Year	Team	GP	GS	MPG	FG%	3P%	FT%	RPG	APG	SPG	BPG	PPG
2020–21	Weber State	23	2	20.5	**.561**	.250	.790	5.8	2.0	1.6	.0	8.2
2021–22	Weber State	**33**	**32**	33.9	.541	**.354**	.800	10.6	2.5	1.8	**.1**	12.6
2022–23	Weber State	32	31	36.3	.462	.303	.813	**10.9**	3.8	1.6	**.1**	16.7
2023–24	Weber State	31	31	**37.0**	.489	.324	**.857**	9.8	**5.2**	**2.0**	**.1**	**20.8**
Career		119	96	32.8	.499	.320	.823	9.6	3.5	1.7	.1	15.0
