= 2025 NBA G League draft =

Basketball league draft

General information
- Sport: Basketball
- Date: October 25, 2025

Overview
- League: NBA
- First selection: Dillon Jones (South Bay Lakers)

The 2025 NBA G League draft was the 25th draft of the NBA G League. It was held on October 25, 2025. Dillon Jones was selected by the South Bay Lakers as the first overall pick.

== Key ==
Pos.	G	F	C
Position	Guard	Forward	Center

†	Denotes player who was also selected in an NBA Draft

== Draft ==
=== First round ===
Pick	Player	Pos.	Nationality	Team	College/country
1	Dillon Jones^{†}	F	United States	South Bay Lakers	Weber State
2	Tyler Smith^{†}	F	United States	Osceola Magic	NBA G League Ignite
3	Ace Baldwin Jr.	G	United States	Capital City Go-Go	Penn State
4	Adama Bal	G	France	Grand Rapids Gold	Santa Clara
5	Nolan Hickman	G	United States	Capital City Go-Go	Gonzaga
6	Cam Carter	G	United States	Capital City Go-Go	Louisiana
7	Stefan Todorović	F	Serbia	Motor City Cruise	Pepperdine
8	Jamal Mashburn Jr.	G	United States	Westchester Knicks	Temple
9	Ethan Taylor	G	United States	Greensboro Swarm	Air Force
10	A.J. Hoggard	G	United States	Raptors 905	Vanderbilt
11	Kario Oquendo	G	United States	Texas Legends	Southern Methodist
12	Kenan Blackshear	G	United States	Grand Rapids Gold	Nevada
13	Vinícius da Silva	C	Brazil	Oklahoma City Blue	Spain
14	Josh Cohen	F	United States	Sioux Falls Skyforce	Southern California
15	Cearius Warren	C	United States	Texas Legends	St. Thomas
16	Ebenezer Dowuona	F	Ghana	Osceola Magic	James Madison
17	John Harge	F	United States	Oklahoma City Blue	Adams State
18	Tray Jackson	F	United States	Birmingham Squadron	Michigan
19	Jaden Seymour	F	United States	Westchester Knicks	East Tennessee State
20	Christopher Mantis	F	United States	Birmingham Squadron	Maine
21	Tyrin Lawrence	G	United States	College Park Skyhawks	Georgia
22	JP Pegues	G	United States	Raptors 905	Auburn
23	Olisa Akonobi	C	Nigeria	Greensboro Swarm	Alabama A&M
24	–	–	–	Oklahoma City Blue	–
25	Selton Miguel	G	Angola	South Bay Lakers	Maryland
26	O'Mar Stanley	F	United States	Motor City Cruise	Boise State
27	Ben Coupet Jr.	F	United States	Noblesville Boom	Southern Illinois-Carbondale
28	Desmond Watson	G	United States	Salt Lake City Stars	Loyola-Chicago
29	Jabri Abdur-Rahim	G	United States	Stockton Kings	Providence
30	Carter Whitt	G	United States	Salt Lake City Stars	Belmont
31	JZ Zaher	G	United States	Capital City Go-Go	Bowling Green

=== Second round ===
Pick	Player	Pos.	Nationality	Team	College/country
1	Sean Durugordon	G	United States	Texas Legends	Old Dominion
2	–	–	–	Stockton Kings	–
3	Jermaine Couisnard	G	United States	Salt Lake City Stars	Oregon
4	Dischon Thomas	F	United States	Sioux Falls Skyforce	Montana
5	Bryce Thompson	G	United States	Valley Suns	Oklahoma State
6	Darius Maddox	G	United States	Sioux Falls Skyforce	George Mason
7	Derrin Boyd	F	United States	Santa Cruz Warriors	College of Charleston
8	Pierre Crockrell II	G	United States	Austin Spurs	California-Irvine
9	Markeese Hastings	F	United States	Grand Rapids Gold	Robert Morris
10	Vance Jackson	F	United States	Maine Celtics	East Carolina
11	Chandler Baker	G	United States	Texas Legends	Colgate
12	–	–	–	Osceola Magic	–
13	Onno Steger	F	United States	Wisconsin Herd	Western Carolina
14	Donte Ingram	F	United States	Iowa Wolves	Loyola-Chicago
15	Kobe Webster	G	United States	Memphis Hustle	UNLV
16	Tyler Hawkins	G	United States	Sioux Falls Skyforce	Barry
17	Jason Hubbard	F	United States	Motor City Cruise	Taylor
18	T.J. Weeks	G	United States	Wisconsin Herd	Rider
19	–	–	–	Grand Rapids Gold	–
20	–	–	–	Austin Spurs	–
21	–	–	–	Capital City Go-Go	–
22	Ahmaad Rorie	G	United States	Noblesville Boom	Montana
23	Nicolas Timberlake	G	United States	Maine Celtics	Kansas
24	–	–	–	Oklahoma City Blue	–
25	–	–	–	Rip City Remix	–
26	–	–	–	Texas Legends	–
27	Franco Miller Jr.	G	Bahamas	Santa Cruz Warriors	Florida Gulf Coast
28	Ray Harrison	G	United States	Motor City Cruise	Grand Canyon
29	–	–	–	Wisconsin Herd	–
30	Fousseyni Drame	F	Mali	Westchester Knicks	Duquesne
31	–	–	–	Osceola Magic	–
