= Alex Reese =

American basketball player (born 1999)

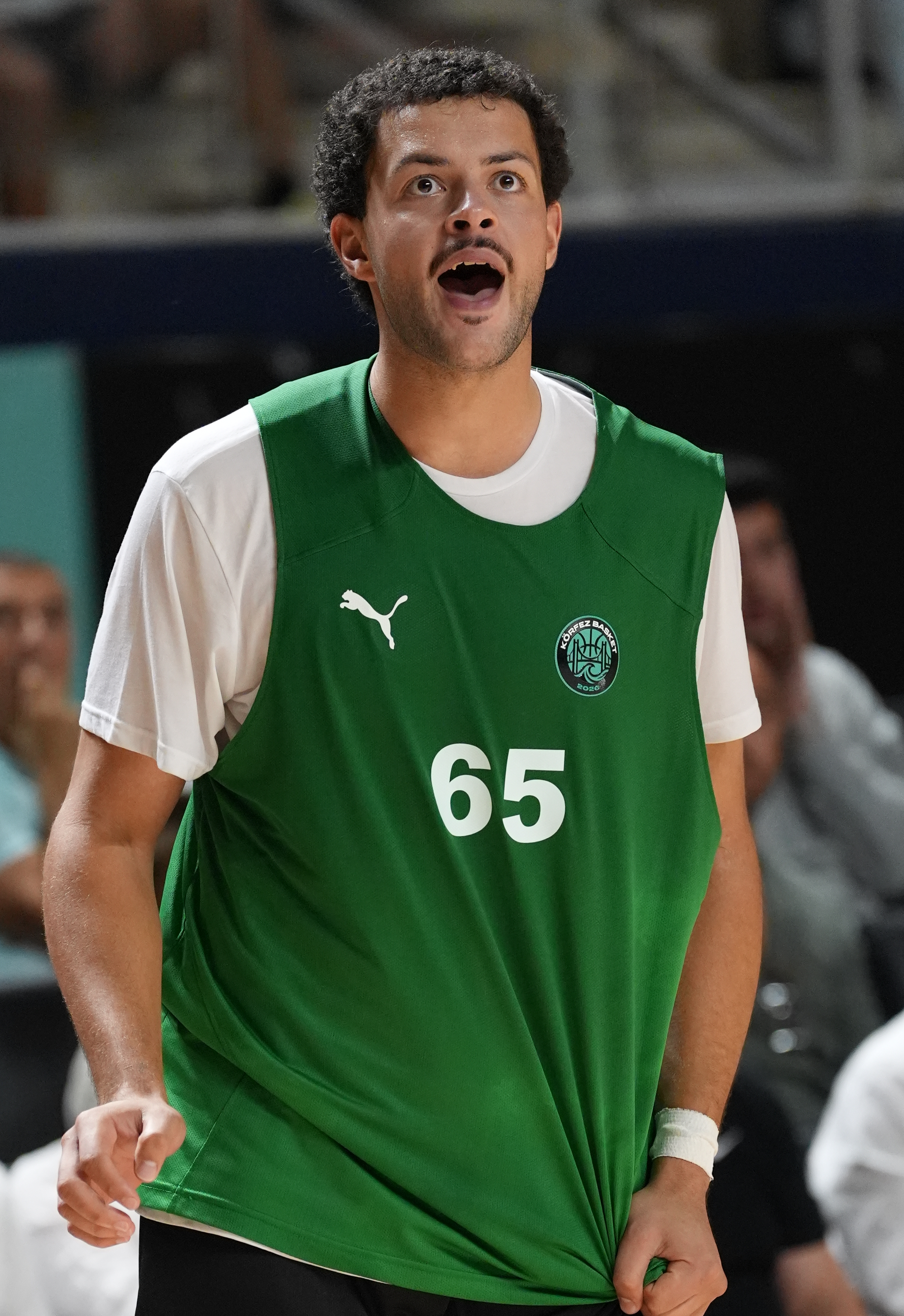
- Reese with Körfez Basket in August 2026

No. 65 – Biotekno Körfez Basket
- Position: Power forward / center
- League: Basketbol Süper Ligi

Personal information
- Born: May 21, 1999 (age 27) Pelham, Alabama, U.S.
- Listed height: 6 ft 9 in (2.06 m)
- Listed weight: 245 lb (111 kg)

Career information
- High school: Pelham (Pelham, Alabama)
- College: Alabama (2017–2021)
- NBA draft: 2021: undrafted
- Playing career: 2022–present

Career history
- 2022–2023: Amicale Steesel
- 2023–2024: Rip City Remix
- 2024: Oklahoma City Thunder
- 2024–2025: Rip City Remix
- 2025: Philadelphia 76ers
- 2025: →Delaware Blue Coats
- 2025–2026: Rip City Remix
- 2026–present: Körfez Basket
- Stats at NBA.com
- Stats at Basketball Reference

Alex Reese (born May 21, 1999) is an American professional basketball player for Körfez Basket of the Basketbol Süper Ligi (BSL). He played college basketball for the Alabama Crimson Tide, and appeared in 15 NBA games.

== High school career ==
Reese attended Pelham High School in Pelham, Alabama where he averaged a double-double in each season, including 25.4 points, 10.9 rebounds and 2 blocks per game as a junior, helping the Panthers reach the Sweet 16 as a junior and the Elite Eight during his senior season after the program had only once reached the Sweet 16 previously. For that, he was named the 6A Player of the Year and to the Alabama All-Star Team as a senior and was a two-time All-State First Team selection. He also was a two-time Shelby County Player of the Year, sharing the award as a junior and winning it outright as a senior.

== College career ==
Reese attended Alabama where he played four years and appeared in 124 games, starting 36, while averaging 5.4 points and 3.1 rebounds on .369/.282/.706 shooting splits as a senior.

== Professional career ==
After going undrafted in the 2021, Reese spent a year away from the game working as a bartender and moving furniture, before signing with Amicale Steesel of the Luxembourg Basketball League on July 26, 2022. In 27 games, he averaged 23.7 points, 12.9 rebounds, 1.4 assists, 1.0 steals and 1.5 blocks in 33.1 minutes.

On October 30, 2023, Reese joined the Rio Grande Valley Vipers after a tryout, but was waived on November 8. He was later claimed off waivers by the Rip City Remix where he played in 43 games and averaged 11.5 points, 4.6 rebounds and 1.2 blocks in 17.2 minutes.

After joining the Portland Trail Blazers for the 2024 NBA Summer League, Reese signed with the Oklahoma City Thunder on September 27, 2024, but was waived on October 16. Three days later, he re-signed with the Thunder, but was waived on October 31 after playing in one game.

On November 3, 2024, Reese returned to the Rip City Remix.

On February 20, 2025, Reese signed a two-way contract with the Philadelphia 76ers. He made 14 appearances for Philadelphia, averaging 5.3 points, 3.3 rebounds, and 0.3 assists. Reese was waived by the 76ers following the signing of Dominick Barlow on July 9.

For the 2025–26 season, Reese re-joined the Remix.

On August 9, 2026, Reese signed with Körfez Basket of the Basketbol Süper Ligi (BSL).

== Career statistics ==
Legend
GP	Games played	GS	Games started	MPG	Minutes per game
FG%	Field goal percentage	3P%	3-point field goal percentage	FT%	Free throw percentage
RPG	Rebounds per game	APG	Assists per game	SPG	Steals per game
BPG	Blocks per game	PPG	Points per game	**Bold**	Career high

=== NBA ===
Year	Team	GP	GS	MPG	FG%	3P%	FT%	RPG	APG	SPG	BPG	PPG
2024–25	Oklahoma City	1	0	1.9	**1.000**	—	—	1.0	.0	.0	.0	2.0
2024–25	Philadelphia	**14**	0	**15.3**	.472	**.366**	**.750**	**3.3**	**.3**	**.7**	**.7**	**5.3**
Career		15	0	14.4	.481	.366	.750	3.1	.3	.7	.7	5.1

=== College ===
Year	Team	GP	GS	MPG	FG%	3P%	FT%	RPG	APG	SPG	BPG	PPG
2017–18	Alabama	32	1	11.6	.390	.324	**.786**	2.8	.3	**.5**	.2	4.0
2018–19	Alabama	28	0	13.3	**.403**	**.375**	.755	2.5	.5	.4	.4	6.3
2019–20	Alabama	31	**26**	**22.8**	.391	.298	.667	**4.8**	**1.1**	.4	**1.0**	**8.8**
2020–21	Alabama	**33**	9	15.2	.369	.282	.706	3.1	.6	**.5**	.5	5.4
Career		124	36	15.7	.387	.311	.719	3.3	.6	.4	.5	6.1

== Personal life ==
The son of Brian and Rebakah Reese, he has two brothers. His uncle, Quinton Reese, played football at Auburn and was drafted by the Detroit Lions in 2000.
