= Aaron Wiggins =

American basketball player (born 1999)

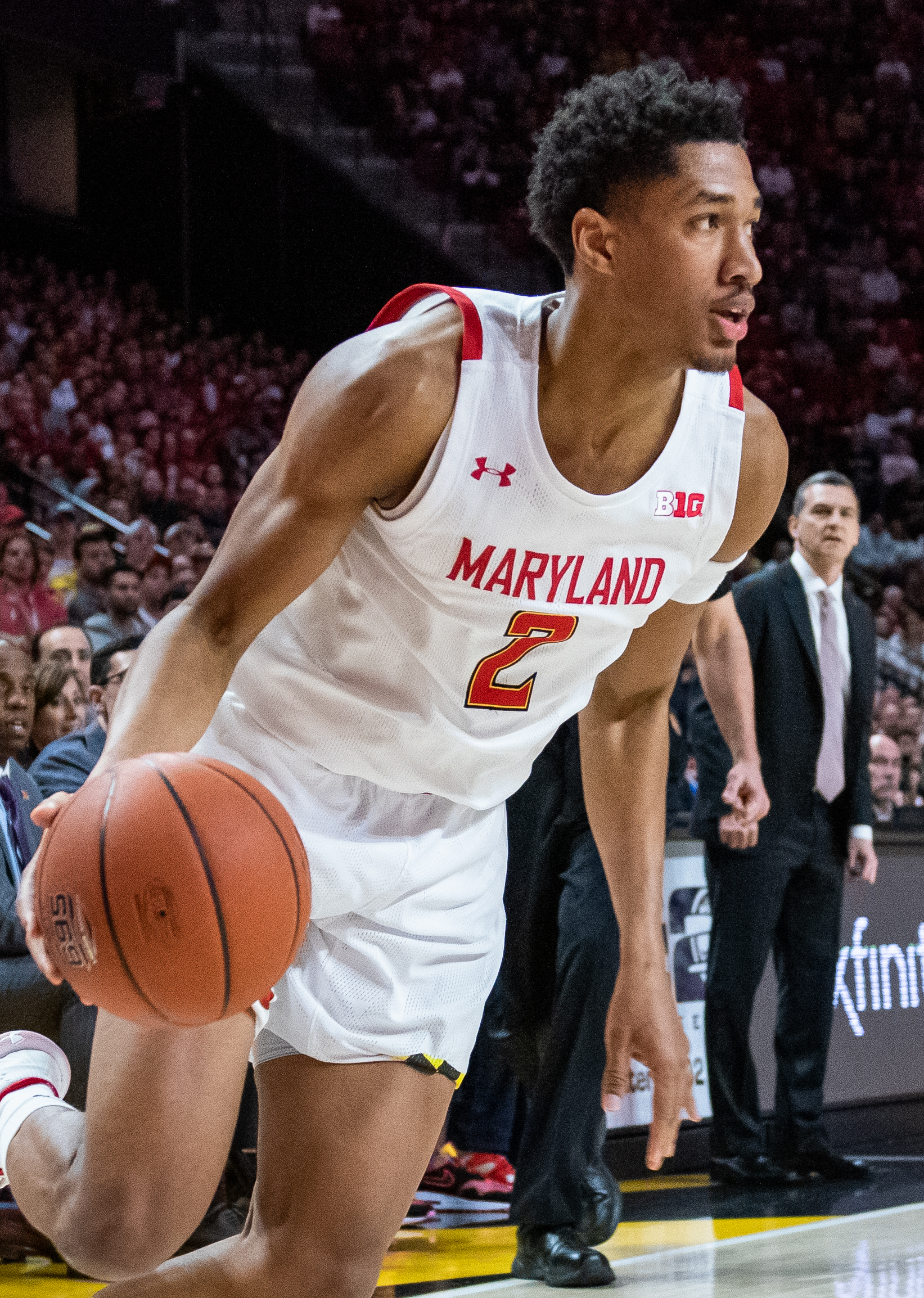
- Wiggins with Maryland in 2020

No. 2 – Atlanta Hawks
- Position: Shooting guard
- League: NBA

Personal information
- Born: January 2, 1999 (age 27) Greensboro, North Carolina, U.S.
- Listed height: 6 ft 5 in (1.96 m)
- Listed weight: 190 lb (86 kg)

Career information
- High school: Grimsley (Greensboro, North Carolina); Wesleyan Christian Academy (High Point, North Carolina)
- College: Maryland (2018–2021)
- NBA draft: 2021: 2nd round, 55th overall pick
- Drafted by: Oklahoma City Thunder
- Playing career: 2021–present

Career history
- 2021–2026: Oklahoma City Thunder
- 2021–2023: →Oklahoma City Blue
- 2026–present: Atlanta Hawks

Career highlights
- NBA champion (2025); Big Ten Sixth Man of the Year (2020)
- Stats at NBA.com
- Stats at Basketball Reference

Aaron Daniel Wiggins (born January 2, 1999) is an American professional basketball player for the Atlanta Hawks of the National Basketball Association (NBA). He played college basketball for the Maryland Terrapins, where he was named Big Ten Sixth Man of the Year in 2020.

Wiggins was selected by the Oklahoma City Thunder in the second round of the 2021 NBA draft. Spending five seasons with the team, he won an NBA championship with the Thunder in 2025. He was traded to the Hawks during the 2026 off-season.

== Early life ==
Wiggins grew up playing basketball, football and running track. Through his childhood, he played the piano and trombone, acted in plays and danced. Wiggins played basketball for Grimsley High School in Greensboro, North Carolina before transferring to Wesleyan Christian Academy in High Point, North Carolina. As a senior, he was an NCISAA Class 3A All-State selection. Wiggins competed for Team Charlotte on the Amateur Athletic Union circuit. A consensus four-star recruit, he committed to play college basketball for Maryland on June 3, 2017. He had drawn the attention of Maryland's coaching staff while they were visiting Wesleyan to watch his teammate Jaylen Hoard.

== College career ==
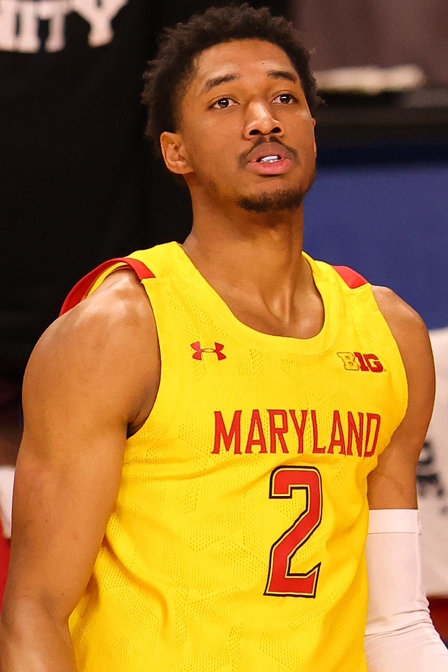
Wiggins with Maryland in 2021

Wiggins began his freshman season as a starter, but later told coach Mark Turgeon that he was more comfortable coming off the bench. As a freshman at Maryland, he played the most minutes among his team's reserves. He led Maryland with a season-high 15 points in losses to Michigan and Michigan State. He finished the season averaging 8.3 points and 3.3 rebounds in 23.5 minutes per game, shooting a team-high 41.3 percent from three-point range. On February 23, 2020, Wiggins scored a sophomore season-high 20 points, recording six three-pointers, in a 79–72 loss to Ohio State. As a sophomore, he averaged 10.4 points, 4.9 rebounds and 1.4 assists per game and was named Big Ten Sixth Man of the Year. In the final game of his junior season, Wiggins scored a career-high 27 points in a 96–77 loss to Alabama in the second round of the NCAA tournament. As a junior, he averaged 14.5 points, 5.8 rebounds and 2.5 assists per game, earning All-Big Ten honorable mention. On April 9, 2021, Wiggins declared for the 2021 NBA draft while maintaining his college eligibility. He later decided to remain in the draft.

== Professional career ==
=== Oklahoma City Thunder (2021–2026) ===
Wiggins was selected in the second round of the 2021 NBA draft with the 55th pick by the Oklahoma City Thunder. Wiggins had a very productive NBA Summer League with the Thunder averaging the second most points on the team with 11.2 PPG. On August 15, 2021, he signed a two-way contract with the Thunder. Under the terms of the deal, he split time between the Thunder and their NBA G League affiliate, the Oklahoma City Blue. On December 26, 2021, Wiggins scored a then career-high 24 points against the New Orleans Pelicans. He shot 8 for 10 from the field and 2 for 4 from three in Thunder's 117–112 win. On February 12, 2022, the Thunder converted Wiggins two-way contract into a standard NBA deal.

On July 7, 2024, Wiggins re-signed with the Thunder on a five-year, $45 million contract. On February 1, 2025, Wiggins registered a career-high 41 points and 14 rebounds against the Sacramento Kings. Wiggins became an NBA champion when the Thunder defeated the Indiana Pacers in game 7 of the 2025 NBA Finals.

=== Atlanta Hawks (2026–present) ===
On July 6, 2026, Wiggins was traded to the Atlanta Hawks in exchange for two future second-round picks and a $9 million trade exception for 2027. On October 21, he made his Hawks debut, putting up 16 points, three rebounds and two steals in a 132–125 win over the Orlando Magic.

== Career statistics ==
Legend
GP	Games played	GS	Games started	MPG	Minutes per game
FG%	Field goal percentage	3P%	3-point field goal percentage	FT%	Free throw percentage
RPG	Rebounds per game	APG	Assists per game	SPG	Steals per game
BPG	Blocks per game	PPG	Points per game	**Bold**	Career high
†	Won an NBA championship

=== NBA ===
==== Regular season ====
Year	Team	GP	GS	MPG	FG%	3P%	FT%	RPG	APG	SPG	BPG	PPG
2021–22	Oklahoma City	50	**35**	**24.2**	.463	.304	.729	3.6	1.4	.6	.2	8.3
2022–23	Oklahoma City	70	14	18.5	.512	.393	**.831**	3.0	1.1	.6	.2	6.8
2023–24	Oklahoma City	**78**	4	15.7	**.562**	**.492**	.789	2.4	1.1	.7	.2	6.9
2024–25†	Oklahoma City	76	26	22.9	.488	.383	**.831**	**3.9**	**1.8**	.8	.2	**12.0**
2025–26	Oklahoma City	65	21	21.8	.431	.356	.736	3.1	1.7	**.9**	**.4**	9.4
Career		339	100	20.3	.487	.380	.784	3.2	1.4	.7	.3	8.7

==== Playoffs ====
Year	Team	GP	GS	MPG	FG%	3P%	FT%	RPG	APG	SPG	BPG	PPG
2024	Oklahoma City	10	0	**15.7**	**.489**	.300	**.909**	**3.2**	**1.0**	.6	**.3**	**6.2**
2025†	Oklahoma City	**22**	0	13.8	.395	**.362**	.765	2.3	.9	.5	**.3**	6.0
2026	Oklahoma City	13	0	5.8	.360	.111	—	.4	.4	.1	.1	1.5
Career		45	0	11.9	.414	.327	.821	1.9	.8	.4	.2	4.7

=== College ===
Year	Team	GP	GS	MPG	FG%	3P%	FT%	RPG	APG	SPG	BPG	PPG
2018–19	Maryland	**34**	4	23.5	.385	**.413**	**.867**	3.3	.8	.8	.2	8.3
2019–20	Maryland	31	16	28.6	.377	.317	.717	4.9	1.4	.8	.4	10.4
2020–21	Maryland	31	**30**	**33.0**	**.446**	.356	.772	**5.8**	**2.5**	**1.1**	**.5**	**14.5**
Career		96	50	28.2	.407	.361	.769	4.6	1.6	.9	.4	11.0
