= Isaiah Joe =

American basketball player (born 1999)

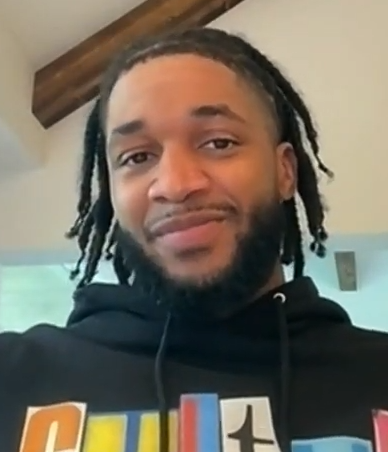
- Joe in 2024

No. 17 – Detroit Pistons
- Position: Shooting guard
- League: NBA

Personal information
- Born: July 2, 1999 (age 27) Fort Smith, Arkansas, U.S.
- Listed height: 6 ft 4 in (1.93 m)
- Listed weight: 165 lb (75 kg)

Career information
- High school: Northside (Fort Smith, Arkansas)
- College: Arkansas (2018–2020)
- NBA draft: 2020: 2nd round, 49th overall pick
- Drafted by: Philadelphia 76ers
- Playing career: 2020–present

Career history
- 2020–2022: Philadelphia 76ers
- 2021: →Delaware Blue Coats
- 2022–2026: Oklahoma City Thunder
- 2026–present: Detroit Pistons

Career highlights
- NBA champion (2025); SEC All-Freshman team (2019); Mr. Basketball of Arkansas (2018)
- Stats at NBA.com
- Stats at Basketball Reference

Derrick Isaiah Joe (born July 2, 1999), nicknamed "Zai", is an American professional basketball player for the Detroit Pistons of the National Basketball Association (NBA). He played college basketball for the Arkansas Razorbacks, where he tied the freshman Southeastern Conference (SEC) three-point field goal record and achieved a new general Razorback best with 113 shots from distance made in a single season.

Joe was selected in the second round of the 2020 NBA Draft with the 49th overall pick by the Philadelphia 76ers. After two seasons with the 76ers, he was waived and joined the Oklahoma City Thunder, winning a championship with them in 2025.

== Early life ==
Joe grew up in Fort Smith, Arkansas, where he attended Northside High School alongside Jaylin Williams, his former professional teammate. He shot 41% from three-point range in his sophomore season and committed to play college basketball at the University of Arkansas during the summer going into his junior year over offers from Alabama and Arkansas-Little Rock. As a junior, Joe averaged 18.8 points, 4.5 rebounds and 2.2 steals per game and helped lead the Grizzlies to an Arkansas Activities Association (AAA) 7A state championship and was named first-team All-State. As a senior, Joe averaged 22.8 points, 4.4 rebounds, 3.4 assists and 2.9 steals per game and was named the Gatorade Arkansas Boys Basketball Player of the Year and the State Player of the Year by USA Today as he led Northside to the state title game before eventually falling to North Little Rock High School.

== College career ==
Joe averaged 13.9 points, 2.8 rebounds, 1.7 assists, and 1.5 steals per game over 34 games played as a freshman and was named to the Southeastern Conference (SEC) All-Freshman team. He made 113 three-pointers on 273 attempts (41.4%), breaking the Arkansas record previously held by Scotty Thurman (102) and tying the record for a freshman in the SEC while also leading the conference in three-point percentage. He was also named the SEC Player of the Week after scoring 34 points on 10 of 13 shooting from three (11–14 overall) against FIU on December 1, 2018.

Entering his sophomore season, Joe was named preseason All-SEC and to Jerry West Award watchlist. Joe was also named the 80th-best collegiate basketball player going into the 2019–20 season by CBS Sports and the 33rd-best prospect for the 2020 NBA draft by ESPN. Joe was named the SEC co-Player of the Week on January 2, 2020, following a 24-point, five rebound performance in a 71–64 win against Indiana. Joe scored 34 points, including 26 in the second half, on January 12 to lead Arkansas in a 76–72 comeback win over Ole Miss. On February 4, Joe underwent an arthroscopic procedure on his knee after an MRI revealed inflammation and was ruled out indefinitely. As a sophomore, Joe averaged 16.9 points and 4.1 rebounds per game. Following the season he declared for the 2020 NBA draft. On August 1, Joe announced he was withdrawing from the draft and returning to Arkansas. However, on August 17 he reversed course and left Arkansas for the professional ranks. Joe is also a member of the Phi Beta Sigma fraternity.

== Professional career ==
=== Philadelphia 76ers (2020–2022) ===
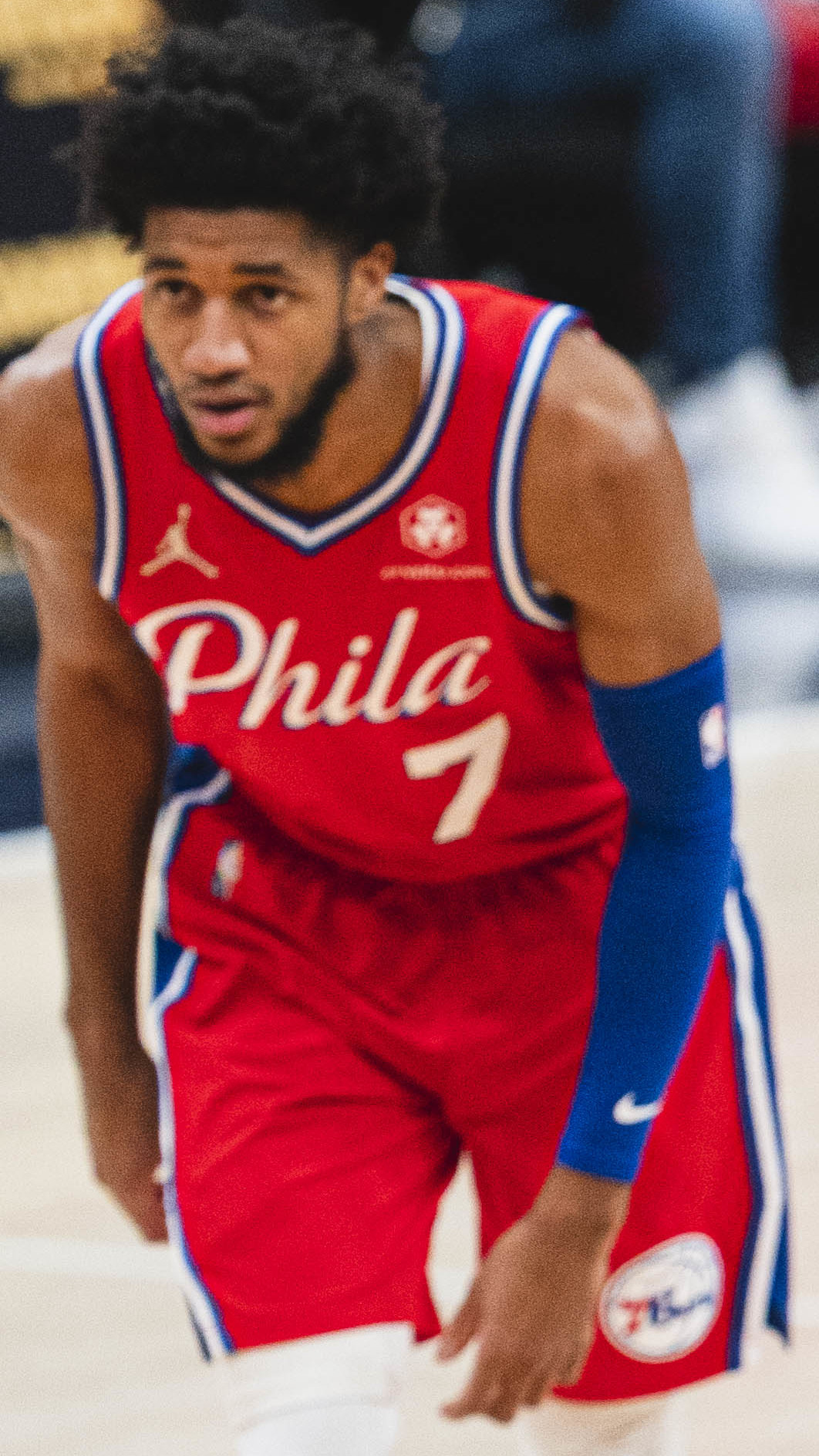
Joe with the Philadelphia 76ers in 2022

Joe was selected with the 49th overall pick in the 2020 NBA draft by the Philadelphia 76ers. On December 3, he signed with the 76ers. Joe made his NBA debut on December 27, 2020, playing seven minutes and scoring two points on 1-of-2 shooting with one rebound, one assist, and one steal in a 118–94 loss to the Cleveland Cavaliers. He made 41 appearances (including one start) for Philadelphia during his rookie campaign, recording averages of 3.7 points, 0.9 rebounds, and 0.5 assists.

Joe played in 55 games (including one start) for the 76ers in the 2021–22 NBA season, averaging 3.6 points, 1.0 rebounds, and 0.6 assists. On October 13, 2022, he was waived by Philadelphia.

=== Oklahoma City Thunder (2022–2026) ===
On October 16, 2022, Joe signed a deal with the Oklahoma City Thunder. On February 24, 2023, Joe scored a then career-high 28 points in a 124–115 loss to the Phoenix Suns. On March 29, Joe put up a career-high 33 points in a 137–134 loss to the Charlotte Hornets. He made 73 appearances (starting 10) for Oklahoma City during the 2022–23 NBA season, averaging 9.5 points, 2.4 rebounds, and 1.2 assists.

On November 16, 2023, Joe made all seven of his three-point attempts en route to 23 points in a 128–109 win against the Golden State Warriors. Joe made 78 appearances for the Thunder during the 2023–24 season, recording averages of 8.2 points, 2.3 rebounds, and 1.3 assists.

On July 1, 2024, Joe re-signed with the Thunder on a four-year, $48 million contract. On January 10, 2025, Joe scored 31 points on 11-of-16 shooting, connecting on a career-high eight three-pointers made in a 126–101 win over the New York Knicks. Joe made 74 appearances (including 16 starts) for Oklahoma City, averaging 10.2 points, 2.6 rebounds, and 1.6 assists. On June 22, Joe won his first NBA championship, defeating the Indiana Pacers 103–91 in Game 7 of the NBA Finals. Although he did not appear in Game 7, Joe was part of the Thunder’s roster and contributed throughout the playoffs, averaging 6.4 points per game and shooting 41.1 percent from three-point range over 21 appearances.

Joe made 71 appearances (including nine starts) for the Thunder during the 2025–26 NBA season, averaging a career–high 11.1 points, 2.5 rebounds, and 1.3 assists.

=== Detroit Pistons (2026–present) ===
On July 6, 2026, Joe was traded to the Detroit Pistons in exchange for two second-round picks. He made his debut for the team on October 20, recording eight points, two rebounds and two assists in a 121–113 win over the Boston Celtics.

== Career statistics ==
Legend
| GP | Games played | GS | Games started | MPG | Minutes per game |
| FG% | Field goal percentage | 3P% | 3-point field goal percentage | FT% | Free throw percentage |
| RPG | Rebounds per game | APG | Assists per game | SPG | Steals per game |
| BPG | Blocks per game | PPG | Points per game | **Bold** | Career high |
| † | Won an NBA championship |

=== NBA ===
==== Regular season ====
| Year | Team | GP | GS | MPG | FG% | 3P% | FT% | RPG | APG | SPG | BPG | PPG |
|---|---|---|---|---|---|---|---|---|---|---|---|---|
| 2020–21 | Philadelphia | 41 | 1 | 9.3 | .361 | .368 | .750 | .9 | .5 | .3 | .1 | 3.7 |
| 2021–22 | Philadelphia | 55 | 1 | 11.1 | .350 | .333 | **.935** | 1.0 | .6 | .3 | .1 | 3.6 |
| 2022–23 | Oklahoma City | 73 | 10 | 19.1 | .441 | .409 | .820 | 2.4 | 1.2 | **.7** | .1 | 9.5 |
| 2023–24 | Oklahoma City | **78** | 1 | 18.5 | **.458** | .416 | .865 | 2.3 | 1.3 | .6 | **.3** | 8.2 |
| 2024–25† | Oklahoma City | 74 | **16** | **21.7** | .440 | .412 | .821 | **2.6** | **1.6** | .6 | .1 | 10.2 |
| 2025–26 | Oklahoma City | 71 | 9 | 21.2 | .455 | **.423** | .894 | 2.5 | 1.3 | **.7** | .2 | **11.1** |
| Career | | 392 | 38 | 17.7 | .436 | .406 | .855 | 2.1 | 1.2 | .6 | .1 | 8.2 |

==== Playoffs ====
| Year | Team | GP | GS | MPG | FG% | 3P% | FT% | RPG | APG | SPG | BPG | PPG |
|---|---|---|---|---|---|---|---|---|---|---|---|---|
| 2021 | Philadelphia | 4 | 0 | 2.4 | .333 | .000 | — | .0 | .3 | .0 | .0 | .5 |
| 2022 | Philadelphia | 7 | 0 | 2.1 | .400 | .333 | — | .3 | .0 | .0 | .0 | .7 |
| 2024 | Oklahoma City | 10 | **2** | **17.3** | .444 | .410 | — | **2.2** | 1.0 | **.5** | .0 | **6.4** |
| 2025† | Oklahoma City | **21** | 0 | 10.0 | **.493** | **.411** | .857 | 1.4 | .7 | .3 | **.1** | 5.1 |
| 2026 | Oklahoma City | 13 | 0 | 11.0 | .418 | .348 | **1.000** | 1.4 | **1.1** | **.5** | **.1** | 4.8 |
| Career | | 55 | 2 | 10.0 | .453 | .384 | .867 | 1.3 | .7 | .3 | .1 | 4.4 |

=== College ===
| Year | Team | GP | GS | MPG | FG% | 3P% | FT% | RPG | APG | SPG | BPG | PPG |
|---|---|---|---|---|---|---|---|---|---|---|---|---|
| 2018–19 | Arkansas | **34** | **34** | 30.1 | **.413** | **.414** | .756 | 2.8 | **1.7** | **1.5** | .1 | 13.9 |
| 2019–20 | Arkansas | 26 | 25 | **36.1** | .367 | .342 | **.890** | **4.1** | **1.7** | 1.4 | **.3** | **16.9** |
| Career | | 60 | 59 | 32.7 | .390 | .378 | .827 | 3.4 | 1.7 | 1.5 | .2 | 15.2 |

== Personal life ==
Joe's brother, Jacob, plays college basketball for the Newman Jets.

In 2024, Joe hosted a "Shooters Shoot" youth training camp in his hometown of Fort Smith, Arkansas, with over 200 kids participating.

== See also ==
- List of NBA career 3-point field goal percentage leaders
