= Malevy Leons =

Dutch basketball player (born 1999)

No. 33 – Golden State Warriors
- Position: Power forward
- League: NBA

Personal information
- Born: 23 September 1999 (age 27) IJmuiden, Netherlands
- Listed height: 6 ft 9 in (2.06 m)
- Listed weight: 206 lb (93 kg)

Career information
- College: Mineral Area (2019–2021); Bradley (2021–2024)
- NBA draft: 2024: undrafted
- Playing career: 2017–present

Career history
- 2017–2019: Apollo Amsterdam
- 2024: Oklahoma City Thunder
- 2024: →Oklahoma City Blue
- 2024–2025: Oklahoma City Blue
- 2025–present: Golden State Warriors
- 2025–present: →Santa Cruz Warriors

Career highlights
- First-team All-MVC (2024); Second-team All-MVC (2023); 2× MVC Defensive Player of the Year (2023, 2024); 2× MVC All-Defensive team (2024); NABC Junior College Player of the Year (2021)
- Stats at NBA.com
- Stats at Basketball Reference

Malevy Leons (born 23 September 1999) is a Dutch professional basketball player for the Golden State Warriors of the National Basketball Association (NBA), on a two-way contract with the Santa Cruz Warriors of the NBA G League. He played college basketball for the Mineral Area College Cardinals and the Bradley Braves.

== Early career ==
Leons was born and raised in IJmuiden by Iwan and Monique Leons and played in the youth academy of Apollo Amsterdam. He made his debut for the senior team in the Dutch Basketball League (DBL) during the 2017–18 season. In the following season, Leons became a permanent member of the team and started in 15 games, contributing 5.9 points and 4 rebounds per game for Apollo.

== College career ==
In 2019, Leons moved to the United States to play for Mineral Area College in Park Hills, Missouri. He helped the team claim a 20–0 record while winning the Midwest District championship. He led the team with 18.7 points and 9.5 rebounds, while also adding 2 blocks and 3.1 assists per game. Leons was named the Junior College Player of the Year by the National Association of Basketball Coaches (NABC).

Starting from the 2021–22 season, Leons played for the Bradley Braves in the Missouri Valley Conference (MVC). He won back-to-back MVC Defensive Player of the Year awards in 2023 and 2024. Leons averaged 13.8 points, 7.1 rebounds, 1.5 steals, 1.5 blocks and 1.3 assists per game as a fifth-year senior.

== Professional career ==
=== Oklahoma City Thunder / Blue (2024–2025) ===
After going undrafted in the 2024 NBA draft, Leons joined the Oklahoma City Thunder for the NBA Summer League and on 27 September 2024, he signed with the team. However, he was waived on 19 October and six days later, he joined the Oklahoma City Blue. On 31 October, he re-signed with the Thunder and on 1 November, Leons made his NBA debut against the Portland Trail Blazers, scoring one point and recording an assist and rebound each in three minutes played. On 15 November, he was waived again by the Thunder and four days later, he joined the Oklahoma City Blue.

On 30 July 2025, Leons re-signed with the Thunder on an Exhibit 10 contract. He was waived prior to the start of the regular season on 18 October.

=== Golden State / Santa Cruz Warriors (2025–present) ===
On December 8, 2025, Leons signed a two-way contract with the Golden State Warriors. In February 2026, Leons and fellow countryman Quinten Post became the first pair of Dutch teammates in the NBA since 2009.

On 2 July, 2026, he joined the Warriors for the 2026 NBA Summer League. Leons won the 2026 NBA Summer League Championship with the Warriors, beating the Memphis Grizzlies 94–90 in the final.

== Player profile ==
Standing at 6 feet 9 inches (2.06 m) with a 7-foot-1-inch (2.16 m) wingspan, scouts have praised his versatility for his size, as well as his defensive awareness.

== Career statistics ==
Legend
GP	Games played	GS	Games started	MPG	Minutes per game
FG%	Field goal percentage	3P%	3-point field goal percentage	FT%	Free throw percentage
RPG	Rebounds per game	APG	Assists per game	SPG	Steals per game
BPG	Blocks per game	PPG	Points per game	**Bold**	Career high

=== NBA ===
Year	Team	GP	GS	MPG	FG%	3P%	FT%	RPG	APG	SPG	BPG	PPG
2024–25	Oklahoma City	6	0	3.5	.000	.000	.500	.5	.2	.0	.0	.3
2025–26	Golden State	**25**	**2**	**11.0**	**.444**	**.250**	**.789**	**2.1**	**.9**	**.6**	**.4**	**3.3**
Career		31	2	9.6	.432	.235	.739	1.8	.8	.5	.3	2.7

=== DBL ===
Year	Team	GP	GS	MPG	FG%	3P%	FT%	RPG	APG	SPG	BPG	PPG
2017–18	Apollo Amsterdam	16	0	11.8	**.431**	.059	**.792**	2.3	0.5	**0.9**	0.3	4.0
2018–19	Apollo Amsterdam	**35**	**15**	**18.7**	.405	**.292**	.649	**4.0**	0.5	0.6	0.3	**5.9**

=== College ===
Year	Team	GP	GS	MPG	FG%	3P%	FT%	RPG	APG	SPG	BPG	PPG
2019–20	Mineral Area College	**32**	**31**	3.6	**.613**	**.300**	**.877**	6.6	1.9	**1.7**	**2.1**	13.1
2020–21	Mineral Area College	25	24	8.0	.564	.293	.723	**9.5**	**3.1**	1.1	2.0	**18.7**
