= Ajay Mitchell =

Belgian basketball player (born 2002)

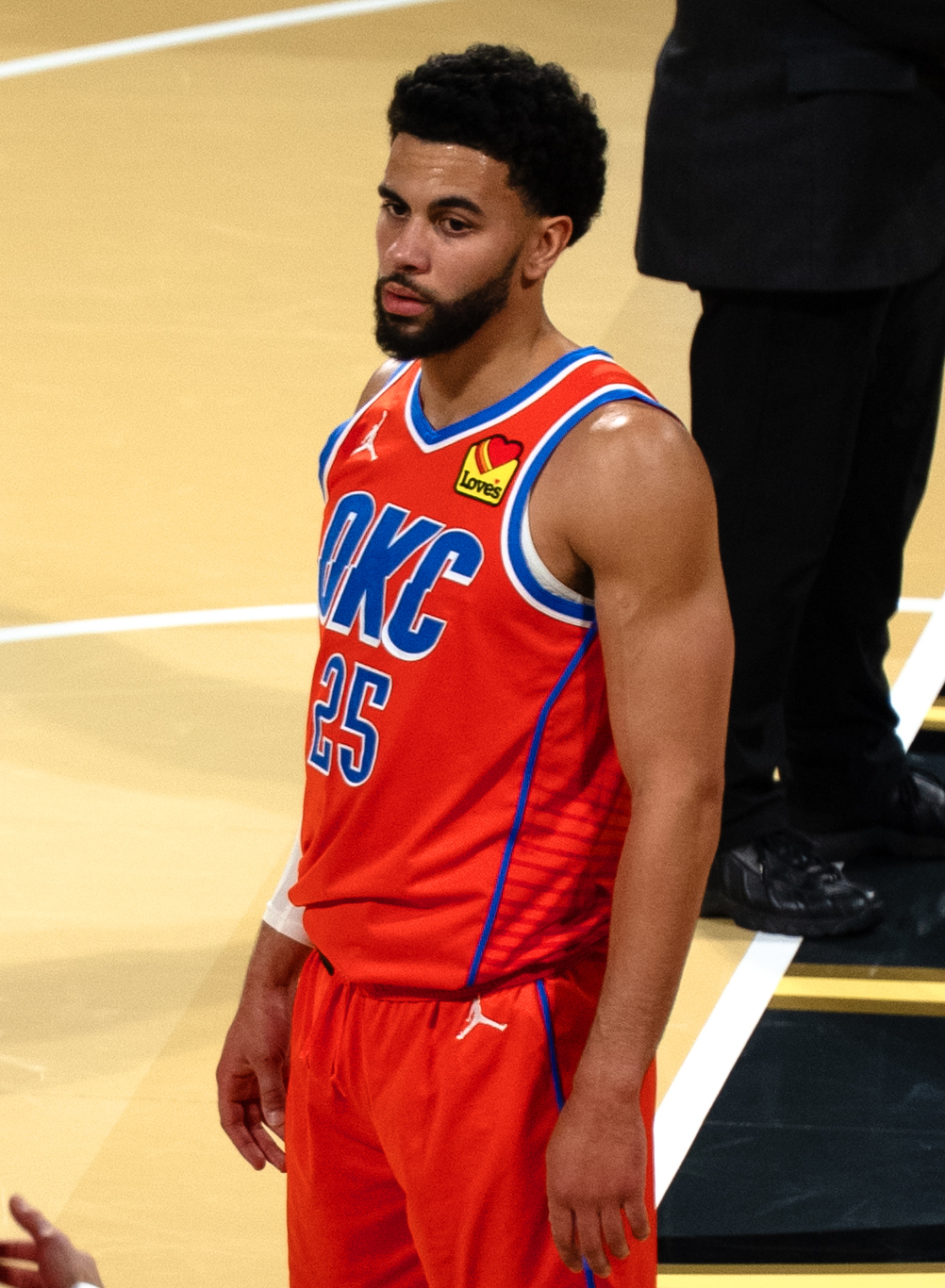
- Mitchell with the Oklahoma City Thunder in 2025

No. 25 – Oklahoma City Thunder
- Position: Shooting guard
- League: NBA

Personal information
- Born: 25 June 2002 (age 24) Ans, Belgium
- Listed height: 6 ft 4 in (1.93 m)
- Listed weight: 190 lb (86 kg)

Career information
- College: UC Santa Barbara (2021–2024)
- NBA draft: 2024: 2nd round, 38th overall pick
- Drafted by: New York Knicks
- Playing career: 2019–present

Career history
- 2019–2021: Limburg United
- 2024–present: Oklahoma City Thunder

Career highlights
- NBA champion (2025); Big West Player of the Year (2023); 2× First-team All-Big West (2023, 2024); Second-team All-Big West (2022); Big West Freshman of the Year (2022)
- Stats at NBA.com
- Stats at Basketball Reference

Ajay Mitchell (born 25 June 2002) is a Belgian-American professional basketball player for the Oklahoma City Thunder of the National Basketball Association (NBA). He played college basketball for the UC Santa Barbara Gauchos. Mitchell was selected with the 38th overall pick in the second round of the 2024 NBA draft by the New York Knicks, but was immediately traded to the Thunder on draft night. During his rookie season with the Thunder, Mitchell won his first NBA championship in the 2025 NBA finals. He has also played for the Belgium national team.

== Early life and career ==
Mitchell grew up in Ans, Belgium. At age 17, he moved to France for a period of a few months, where he played thirteen games in the under-18 team of Nanterre 92 along with Victor Wembanyama. He began playing for Limburg United's youth team in 2019 and made two appearances with the senior team in the Pro Basketball League during the 2019–20 season.

Mitchell played solely with the senior team during the 2020–21 season while maintaining his amateur status. After the season, he committed to playing college basketball for UC Santa Barbara.

== College career ==
Mitchell played in 27 games during his freshman season and was named the Big West Conference Freshman of the Year and second team All-Big West after averaging 11.6 points, 3.7 assists, and 2.2 rebounds per game. He averaged 16.3 points, 5.1 assists, and 2.7 rebounds per game and was named the Big West Player of the Year during his sophomore season.

== Professional career ==
On 27 June 2024, Mitchell was selected with the 38th overall pick by the New York Knicks in the 2024 NBA Draft; however, immediately on draft night, he was traded to the Oklahoma City Thunder in exchange for the 40th overall pick in the 2024 draft and cash. On 6 July, Mitchell signed a two-way contract with the Thunder. During his first regular season, he would post a career-high 26 points against the Indiana Pacers on October 23rd.

On 10 January 2025, Mitchell was ruled out for 10-to-12 weeks after undergoing surgery to repair a turf toe sprain in the great toe on his right foot. On 6 February, the Thunder officially converted Mitchell to a standard contract, signing him to a two-year contract. On 22 June, the Thunder won the NBA title, making Mitchell the second Belgian NBA champion, after D. J. Mbenga. On 30 June, Mitchell re-signed with the Thunder on a three-year, $9 million contract. He delivered a playoff-high 28 points on May 11 against the Los Angeles Lakers in the Western Conference Semi-Finals.

== National team career ==
Mitchell played for the Belgium under-18 team, before making his debut with the senior team at age 18 in 2021.

== Career statistics ==
Legend
GP	Games played	GS	Games started	MPG	Minutes per game
FG%	Field goal percentage	3P%	3-point field goal percentage	FT%	Free throw percentage
RPG	Rebounds per game	APG	Assists per game	SPG	Steals per game
BPG	Blocks per game	PPG	Points per game	**Bold**	Career high
†	Won an NBA championship

=== NBA ===
==== Regular season ====
Year	Team	GP	GS	MPG	FG%	3P%	FT%	RPG	APG	SPG	BPG	PPG
2024–25†	Oklahoma City	36	1	16.6	**.495**	**.383**	.829	1.9	1.8	.7	.1	6.5
2025–26	Oklahoma City	**57**	**16**	**25.8**	.485	.347	**.870**	**3.3**	**3.6**	**1.2**	**.3**	**13.6**
Career		93	17	22.3	.487	.356	.863	2.8	2.9	1.0	.2	10.8

==== Playoffs ====
Year	Team	GP	GS	MPG	FG%	3P%	FT%	RPG	APG	SPG	BPG	PPG
2025†	Oklahoma City	**12**	0	7.0	.457	**.385**	.800	.8	.8	.2	.0	3.4
2026	Oklahoma City	11	**7**	**28.8**	**.460**	.325	**.900**	**3.7**	**4.3**	**1.5**	**.1**	**15.1**
Career		23	7	17.4	.459	.340	.886	2.2	2.4	.8	.0	9.0

=== College ===
Year	Team	GP	GS	MPG	FG%	3P%	FT%	RPG	APG	SPG	BPG	PPG
2021–22	UC Santa Barbara	27	23	32.1	**.531**	.327	.750	2.2	3.7	.8	.2	11.6
2022–23	UC Santa Barbara	**35**	**35**	**33.8**	.506	.267	.813	2.7	**5.1**	**1.3**	.3	16.3
2023–24	UC Santa Barbara	29	29	31.5	.504	**.393**	**.858**	**4.0**	4.0	1.2	**.4**	**20.0**
Career		91	87	32.5	.511	.332	.818	3.0	4.3	1.1	.3	16.1

== Personal life ==
Born to Belgian Fabienne Wagemans and Barry Mitchell who played college basketball at Norfolk State and professionally in the Continental Basketball Association and World Basketball League before leaving a legacy in Belgian basketball. He is a Christian.

On August 18, 2026, Mitchell was named as the general manager for his alma mater, the UC Santa Barbara Gauchos.
