= Alex Ducas =

Australian basketball player (born 2000)

No. 8 – Balkan Botevgrad
- Position: Shooting guard / small forward
- League: NBL; EuroCup

Personal information
- Born: 11 December 2000 (age 25) Geraldton, Western Australia, Australia
- Listed height: 6 ft 7 in (2.01 m)
- Listed weight: 220 lb (100 kg)

Career information
- High school: Nagle Catholic College (Geraldton, Western Australia); Lake Ginninderra (Canberra, ACT)
- College: Saint Mary's (2019–2024)
- NBA draft: 2024: undrafted
- Playing career: 2016–present

Career history
- 2016–2019: Geraldton Buccaneers
- 2017–2019: BA Centre of Excellence
- 2024–2025: Oklahoma City Thunder
- 2024–2025: →Oklahoma City Blue
- 2025–2026: Brisbane Bullets
- 2026–present: Balkan Botevgrad

Career highlights
- NBA champion (2025); SBL champion (2019); NBL1 Youth Player of the Year (2019); 2× Second-team All-WCC (2022, 2024)
- Stats at NBA.com
- Stats at Basketball Reference
Medals
Men's basketball
Representing Australia
FIBA Asia Cup
Gold medal – first place	2022 Jakarta

Alexander Ducas (born 11 December 2000) is an Australian professional basketball player for Balkan Botevgrad of the Bulgarian National Basketball League (NBL) and the EuroCup. He began his career in the Australian state leagues before moving to the United States in 2019 to play college basketball for the Saint Mary's Gaels. He played five seasons for the Gaels and earned second-team All-WCC in 2022 and 2024. He played for the Oklahoma City Thunder of the National Basketball Association (NBA) during the 2024–25 season, on a two-way contract with the Oklahoma City Blue of the NBA G League. He was a member of the Thunder's 2025 NBA championship-winning team.

== Early life and career ==
Ducas was born and raised in Geraldton, Western Australia, where he attended Nagle Catholic College.

In 2016, Ducas debuted for the Geraldton Buccaneers in the State Basketball League (SBL), averaging 2.27 points in 22 games. In 2017, he played 13 games for the Buccaneers, averaging 5.67 points and 1.47 rebounds per game. He also played five games for the BA Centre of Excellence in the South East Australian Basketball League (SEABL), averaging 2.4 points and 1.2 rebounds per game. In 2018, he averaged nine points in three SBL games for the Buccaneers before returning to the Centre of Excellence and averaging 12.2 points, 2.1 rebounds and 1.5 assists in 14 SEABL games.

In 2019, Ducas played nine games for the Centre of Excellence of the NBL1 in the league's inaugural season, averaging 21.8 points, 3.6 rebounds, 1.4 assists and 1.0 steals per game. He was named the NBL1 Youth Player of the Year. He finished the year with the Buccaneers and helped them win the SBL championship for the 2019 SBL season. In 13 games for the Buccaneers, he averaged 15.54 points, 3.92 rebounds and 3.08 assists per game.

While in Canberra at the Centre of Excellence, Ducas attended Lake Ginninderra College.

== College career ==
On 5 November 2019, Ducas made his debut for Saint Mary's, recording 3 points and 2 rebounds against Wisconsin. As a freshman, Ducas appeared in 33 games, starting in 11 games – which was more games as a true freshman than any Gael since Matthew Dellavedova. In his sophomore season, Ducas suffered an ankle injury, causing him to appear in only 14 games. Prior to his injury, Ducas averaged 11.3 points on 35.7% from three. He posted 10.3 points per game as a junior. As a senior, Ducas averaged 12.5 points per game shooting 41.4% from beyond the arc.

In his final season with Saint Mary's, Ducas started every single game for the third consecutive season, shooting a career-best 43.8% from three, making 81 – which was the ninth most in team history and second most in the WCC. Against Davidson, Ducas registered a season-high 23 points on 7 made threes. With Saint Mary's, Ducas won the 2024 WCC tournament and was named a second team All-WCC honoree for the second time. Ducas averaged 9.9 points, 5.6 rebounds and 1.9 assists per game.

As a fifth year guard, Ducas finished his collegiate career playing in a program-record 150 games and finished second all-time in program history with 278 threes.

== Professional career ==
=== Oklahoma City Thunder (2024–2025) ===
After going undrafted in the 2024 NBA draft, Ducas joined the Oklahoma City Thunder for the 2024 NBA Summer League, but did not play. On 16 July 2024, he signed a two-way contract with the Thunder. He scored his first NBA points in January 2025 after a back injury sidelined him for nearly two months. He featured in 21 NBA games during the regular season, averaging 1.7 points and 1.2 rebounds per game. He also played in six games for the Oklahoma City Blue of the NBA G League during the 2024–25 season. Although Ducas did not play for the Thunder during their playoff run, he was part of the squad that won the NBA championship in the 2025 NBA Finals, making him the ninth Australian-born player to earn an NBA title.

Ducas re-joined the Thunder for the 2025 NBA Summer League, playing one game in Salt Lake City.

=== Brisbane Bullets (2025–2026) ===
On 28 July 2025, Ducas signed with the Brisbane Bullets of the National Basketball League (NBL) for the 2025–26 season. He averaged 8.5 points, 2.8 rebounds and 1.5 assists per game across 30 appearances.

=== Balkan Botevgrad (2026–present) ===
On 17 August 2026, Ducas signed with Balkan Botevgrad of the Bulgarian National Basketball League (NBL).

== National team career ==
Ducas played for Australia at the 2019 FIBA Under-19 Basketball World Cup.

Ducas debuted for the Australian Boomers at the 2022 FIBA Asia Cup. He later played for the Boomers during the FIBA Basketball World Cup 2023 Asian Qualifiers.

In October 2025, Ducas was named in the Boomers squad for the first window of the FIBA Basketball World Cup 2027 Asian Qualifiers.

== Career statistics ==
Legend
GP	Games played	GS	Games started	MPG	Minutes per game
FG%	Field goal percentage	3P%	3-point field goal percentage	FT%	Free throw percentage
RPG	Rebounds per game	APG	Assists per game	SPG	Steals per game
BPG	Blocks per game	PPG	Points per game	**Bold**	Career high
†	Won an NBA championship

=== NBA ===
Year	Team	GP	GS	MPG	FG%	3P%	FT%	RPG	APG	SPG	BPG	PPG
2024–25†	Oklahoma City	21	0	6.0	.400	.476	1.000	1.2	.2	.2	.0	1.7
Career		21	0	6.0	.400	.476	1.000	1.2	.2	.2	.0	1.7

=== College ===
Year	Team	GP	GS	MPG	FG%	3P%	FT%	RPG	APG	SPG	BPG	PPG
2019–20	Saint Mary's	33	11	15.1	**.478**	.414	.750	2.2	0.4	0.3	0.0	3.6
2020–21	Saint Mary's	14	9	22.0	.413	.328	.842	4.4	0.5	0.5	0.1	7.9
2021–22	Saint Mary's	34	34	29.8	.409	.387	.820	3.7	0.9	**0.9**	0.2	10.3
2022–23	Saint Mary's	**35**	**35**	**31.3**	.433	.414	**.868**	4.3	1.0	**0.9**	**0.4**	**12.5**
2023–24	Saint Mary's	34	34	28.1	.453	**.438**	.774	**5.6**	**1.9**	0.7	0.2	9.9
Career		150	123	25.8	.433	.406	.828	4.0	1.0	0.7	.2	9.0

== Personal life ==
As of 2024, Ducas' father, Aaron, is an assistant coach for the Geraldton Buccaneers in the NBL1 West.
